= 2024 Montana elections =

- November 5, 2024

A general election was held in Montana on November 5, 2024. Both of Montana's seats in the United States House of Representatives, all of the seats in the Montana House of Representatives, and half of the seats in the Montana Senate were up for election. The primary election was held on June 4, 2024.

== Federal ==
=== President ===
Donald J. Trump received 58% of the vote while Kamala D. Harris had 38%.

=== Congress ===
==== Senate ====
Incumbent Democrat Jon Tester ran for re-election. He was defeated by businessman Tim Sheehy. Libertarian Sid Daoud and Robert Barb of the Green Party each received 1% of the vote.

==== House of Representatives ====
The United States House of Representatives has two districts in Montana. For District 1 the incumbent Republican Ryan Zinke defeated Democrat Monica Tranel and Libertarian Dennis Hayes. In District 2, Republican Troy Downing won against Democrat John Driscoll.

== State ==
=== Executive ===
==== Governor ====
Incumbent Republican Greg Gianforte defeated Democrat Ryan Busse with 59% of the vote. The Libertarian candidate Kaiser Leib received 3% of the vote.

==== Secretary of State ====
The Republican incumbent Christi Jacobsen defeated Democrat Jesse James Mullen and Libertarian John Lamb.

==== Attorney general ====
Incumbent Republican Austin Knudsen defeated Democrat Ben Alke with 60% of the vote.

==== Public Service Commission ====
Three of five seats on the Montana Public Service Commission - Districts 2, 3 and 4 - were up for election on November 5, 2024. The party primaries were on June 4.

For District 2, Republican candidate Brad Molnar won against Democrat Susan Bilo. For District 3, Republican Jeff Welborn defeated Democrat Lenny Williams. For District 4, Republican Jennifer Fielder defeated Independent Elena Evans.

==== State auditor ====
Republican candidate James Brown defeated Democrat John Repke.

==== Superintendent of Public Instruction ====
Incumbent Republican Montana Superintendent of Public Instruction Elsie Arntzen was re-elected in 2020 with 52.2% of the vote. She was term-limited and could not run for re-election. The Republican candidate Susie Hedalen defeated Democratic candidate Shannon O'Brien.

=== Legislature ===
==== Senate ====
25 of the 50 seats in the Montana Senate were up for election in 2024.

==== House of Representatives ====
All 100 seats in the Montana House of Representatives were up for election in 2024.

== Judicial ==
=== Supreme Court Chief Justice ===
2024 Montana Supreme Court Chief Justice election
- November 5, 2024
Candidate	Cory Swanson	Jeremiah Lynch
Popular vote	296,545	254,595
Percentage	53.8%	46.2%
- Swanson: 50–60% 60–70% 70–80% 80–90% >90% Lynch: 50–60% 60–70% 70–80% 80–90% >90% Tie: 50% No votes
Justice before election
Mike McGrath
Elected Justice
Cory Swanson

In the election for Montana Supreme Court Chief Justice, Broadwater County Attorney Cory Swanson received 53.8% of the vote against former federal magistrate judge Jeremiah Lynch. Swanson ran with the backing of the Montana Republican Party while Lynch received support from progressive groups.

==== Candidates ====
- Cory Swanson, Broadwater County Attorney
- Jeremiah Lynch, former federal magistrate judge

Endorsements

Cory Swanson

State officials

- Greg Gianforte, Governor of Montana (2021–present)
Jeremiah Lynch

Organizations

- American Civil Liberties Union
- Montana Federation of Public Employees
- Montana Conservation Voters

==== Results ====
2024 Montana Supreme Court Chief Justice election
Candidate	Votes	%
Cory Swanson	296,545	53.81%
Jeremiah Lynch	254,595	46.19%
Total votes	551,140	100.00%

=== Supreme Court Justice #3 ===
2024 Montana Supreme Court Justice #3 election
- November 5, 2024
Candidate	Katherine M. Bidegaray	Dan Wilson
Popular vote	299,480	254,294
Percentage	54.1%	45.9%
- Bidegaray: 50–60% 60–70% 70–80% 80–90% >90% Wilson: 50–60% 60–70% 70–80% 80–90% >90% Tie: 50% No votes
Justice before election
Dirk Sandefur
Elected Justice
Katherine M. Bidegaray

The election for Supreme Court Justice #3 was between Katherine M. Bidegaray, a judge for Montana's 7th Judicial District, and Dan Wilson, a district court judge in Kalispell. Bidegaray defeated Wilson with 54% of the vote.

==== Candidates ====
- Katherine M. Bidegaray, district court judge
- Dan Wilson, district court judge

Endorsements

Katherine M. Bidegaray

Organizations

- American Civil Liberties Union
- Montana Federation of Public Employees
- Montana Conservation Voters
Dan Wilson

State officials

- Greg Gianforte, Governor of Montana (2021–present)

==== Results ====
2024 Montana Supreme Justice #3 Election
Candidate	Votes	%
Katherine M. Bidegaray	299,480	54.08%
Dan Wilson	254,294	45.92%
Total votes	553,774	100.00%

=== Clerk of the Supreme Court ===
Incumbent Republican Bowen Greenwood ran for re-election as the Clerk of the Montana Supreme Court. He won 57% of the vote against Democrat Erin Farris-Olsen and Libertarian Roger Roots.

=== District Court Judges ===
The majority of Montana District Courts elections were for retention of current judges. For District 2, Department 1, Frank Joseph narrowly defeated Ann Shea with 51% of the vote. For District 11, Department 2, Paul Sullivan defeated Eric S. Hummel. For District 15, Department 1, Benjamin J. Fosland defeated Janet Christoffersen.

Unopposed:

- District 3, Department 1 - Jeffrey W. Dahood
- District 4, Department 2 - Tara Elliott
- District 14, Department 1 - Adam Larsen
- District 16, Department 2 - Rennie Wittman
- District 20, Department 2 - Britt Cotter

== Ballot measures ==
- CI-126 was not approved. It received a 51% no vote. The initiative would have created a top-four primary system for state elections. The top-four vote getters would advance to the general election regardless of party.
- CI-127 was defeated with a 60% no vote. The initiative was to provide that certain elections would be decided by the majority vote instead of plurality A majority vote would mean the candidate must receive more than half of the votes cast.
- CI-128 was to establish a constitutional right to abortion before fetal viability The initiative was approved with a 58% yes vote.

Initiative 126 Results by county No: 80–90%; 70–80%; 60–70%; 50–60%; Yes: 60–70%; 50–60%

Initiative 127 Results by county No: 80–90%; 70–80%; 60–70%; 50–60%; Yes: 50–60%

Initiative 128 Results by county Yes: 70–80%; 60–70%; 50–60%; No: 70–80%; 60–70%; 50–60%
