= Patricia O'Brien Cotter =

American judge (born 1950)

Justice of the Montana Supreme Court
- In office 2000–2016
- Preceded by: William E. Hunt
- Succeeded by: Dirk Sandefur

Personal details
- Born: Patricia O'Brien; 1950 (age 75–76) South Bend, Indiana, U.S.

Patricia O'Brien Cotter (born 1950) was a Montana Supreme Court Associate Justice. She was first elected on November 7, 2000, filling the seat of the retired Justice William E. Hunt. She was reelected to a second term in 2008, and retired in 2016.

== History ==
Originally from South Bend, Indiana, she graduated with honors in 1972 from Western Michigan University with a B.S. in Political Science and History. Prior to law school, she worked two years as paralegal for a Chicago law firm that specialized in real estate law. Cotter's law degree is from the Notre Dame Law School in 1977.

Cotter practiced law for six years in South Bend, after which she and her husband Michael Cotter moved to Montana. She practiced law in Great Falls, Montana, from 1984 to 1985. She and her husband established the firm of Cotter and Cotter in 1985. She was Chair of the Amicus Committee for the Montana Trial Lawyers' Association from 1993 to 1999.

In 1999, Cotter entered the election race for the Montana Supreme Court. On January 1, 2001, Cotter became Montana's third female Supreme Court Justice, following Diane Barz and Karla M. Gray. Her reelection in 2008 was unopposed.

She is admitted to practice before the Fort Peck Tribal Court of Appeals, the Eighth and Ninth Circuit Courts of Appeals, the United States Court of Claims, and the United States Supreme Court.

== Honors ==
Cotter received the Montana Trial Lawyers Association's Public Service Award in 1992 and 1998. This was to honor her preparation and filing of amicus curiae briefs before the Montana Supreme Court.

In 2006, she was presented the Edward C. Alexander Award for distinguished legal service and professionalism by the Cascade County Bar Association.

Legal offices
| Preceded by William E. Hunt | Associate Justice of the Montana Supreme Court; 2000-2016 | Succeeded by Dirk Sandefur |
