= Electoral history of Steve Bullock =

This is the electoral history of Steve Bullock, who served as Governor of Montana from 2013 to 2021. He previously served as the Attorney General of Montana from 2009 to 2013. Bullock sought the 2020 Democratic nomination for President, but ended his campaign before voting began. He was a candidate in the 2020 United States Senate election in Montana, losing to incumbent Steve Daines.

== Montana Attorney General elections ==
=== 2000 ===
Montana Attorney General Democratic Primary, 2000
Party	Candidate	Votes	%
Democratic	Mike McGrath	61,400	70.02%
Democratic	Steve Bullock	26,291	29.98%
Total votes		87,691	100%

=== 2008 ===
Montana Attorney General Democratic Primary, 2008
Party	Candidate	Votes	%
Democratic	Steve Bullock	63,276	42.04%
Democratic	Mike Wheat	54,859	36.45%
Democratic	John Parker	32,362	21.50%
Total votes		150,497	100%

Montana Attorney General General Election, 2008
Party	Candidate	Votes	%
Democratic	Steve Bullock	245,669	52.64%
Republican	Tim Fox	220,992	47.36%
Total votes		466,661	100%
Democratic hold			

== Montana gubernatorial elections ==
=== 2012 ===
Montana Gubernatorial Democratic Primary, 2012
Party	Candidate	Votes	%
Democratic	Steve Bullock/John Walsh	76,738	86.65%
Democratic	Heather Margolis/Steve Nelsen	11,823	13.35%
Total votes		88,561	100%

Montana Gubernatorial General Election, 2012
Party	Candidate	Votes	%
Democratic	Steve Bullock/John Walsh	236,450	48.90%
Republican	Rick Hill/Jon Sonju	228,879	47.34%
Libertarian	Ron Vandevender/Marc Mulcahy	18,160	3.76%
Total votes		483,489	100%
Democratic hold			

=== 2016 ===
Montana Gubernatorial Democratic Primary, 2016
Party	Candidate	Votes	%
Democratic	Steve Bullock/Mike Cooney (incumbent)	111,675	91.22%
Democratic	Bill McChesney/Mike Anderson	10,744	8.78%
Total votes		122,419	100%

Montana Gubernatorial General Election, 2016
Party	Candidate	Votes	%
Democratic	Steve Bullock/Mike Cooney (incumbent)	255,933	50.25%
Republican	Greg Gianforte/Lesley Robinson	236,115	46.36%
Libertarian	Ted Dunlap/Ron Vandevender	17,312	3.39%
Total votes		509,360	100%
Democratic hold			

== 2020 Democratic party presidential primaries ==
Despite ending his campaign before voting began, Bullock still appeared on the ballot in New Hampshire and Arkansas.

=== New Hampshire ===
2020 New Hampshire Democratic primary
Candidate	Votes	%	Delegates (Note: Number of pledged delegates towards the 2020 Democratic National Convention.)
Bernie Sanders	76,355	25.6	9
Pete Buttigieg	72,445	24.3	9
Amy Klobuchar	58,774	19.7	6
Elizabeth Warren	27,428	9.2	0
Joe Biden	24,911	8.3	0
Tom Steyer	10,694	3.6	0
Tulsi Gabbard	9,745	3.3	0
Andrew Yang	8,312	2.8	0
Michael Bloomberg (write-in)	4,777	1.6	0
Deval Patrick	1,266	0.4	0
Donald Trump (write-in Republican)	1,219	0.4	0
Michael Bennet	984	0.3	0
Joe Sestak (withdrawn)	190	0.1	0
Cory Booker (withdrawn)	156	0.1	0
Kamala Harris (withdrawn)	129	0.0	0
Marianne Williamson (withdrawn)	99	0.0	0
Julián Castro (withdrawn)	83	0.0	0
John Delaney (withdrawn)	83	0.0	0
Steve Bullock (withdrawn)	64	0.0	0
Bill Weld (write-in Republican)	16	0.0	0
Various minor candidates (Note: Full results with all 16 minor candidates included available in the main article.)	620	0.2	0
Other write-ins (Note: Other write-ins (173 votes) does not include Michael Bloomberg (4,777 votes), Donald Trump (1,219 votes) and Bill Weld (16 votes). Total number of all write-ins was 6,185 votes.)	173	0.1	0
Total	298,523	100%	24

=== Arkansas ===
2020 Arkansas Democratic primary
Candidate	Votes	%	Delegates
Joe Biden	92,584	40.5	17
Bernie Sanders	51,117	22.4	9
Michael Bloomberg	38,212	16.7	5
Elizabeth Warren	22,860	10.0	
Pete Buttigieg (withdrawn†)	7,674	3.4	
Amy Klobuchar (withdrawn†)	7,027	3.1	
Tom Steyer (withdrawn†)	2,072	0.9	
Tulsi Gabbard	1,616	0.7	
Kamala Harris (withdrawn)	736	0.3	
Andrew Yang (withdrawn)	733	0.3	
Michael Bennet (withdrawn)	597	0.3	
Cory Booker (withdrawn)	594	0.3	
Marianne Williamson (withdrawn)	521	0.2	
Steve Bullock (withdrawn)	503	0.2	
John Delaney (withdrawn)	465	0.2	
Joe Sestak (withdrawn)	427	0.2	
Mosie Boyd	417	0.2	
Julian Castro (withdrawn)	328	0.1	
Total	228,483	100.0	31

†Candidate withdrew after early voting started.

== United States Senate election ==
=== 2020 ===
United States Senate Democratic Primary in Montana, 2020
Party	Candidate	Votes	%
Democratic	Steve Bullock	144,949	95.5%
Democratic	John Mues	3,740	2.5%
Democratic	Mike Knoles (withdrawn)	3,165	2.1%
Total votes		151,854	100.0%

United States Senate election in Montana, 2020
Party	Candidate	Votes	%	±%
Republican	Steve Daines (incumbent)	333,174	55.01%	−2.78%
Democratic	Steve Bullock	272,463	44.99%	+4.92%
Total votes		605,637	100.00%	
Republican hold				
