= List of first women lawyers and judges in Montana =

This is a list of the first women lawyer(s) and judge(s) in Montana. It includes the year in which the women were admitted to practice law (in parentheses). Also included are women who achieved other distinctions such becoming the first in their state to graduate from law school or become a political figure.

== Firsts in Montana's history ==
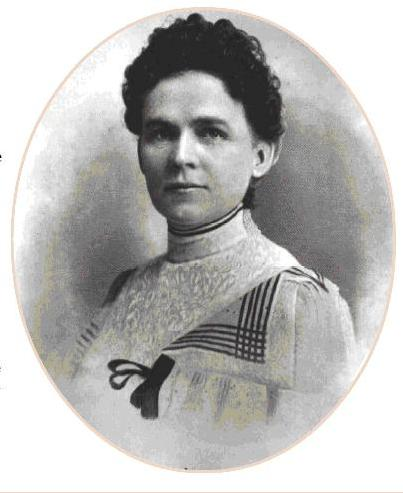
Ella Knowles Haskell: First female lawyer in Montana (1888)

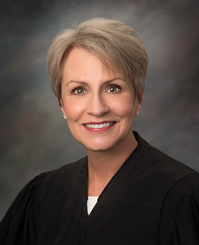
Susan P. Watters: First female judge of the U.S. District Court in Montana (2014)

=== Law School ===
- First female law graduate: Edna Rankin McKinnon (1919)

=== Lawyers ===
- First female: Ella Knowles Haskell (1888)
- First Native American (Crow Nation) female: Mary Frances Garrigus (c. 1918)

=== Law Clerk ===
- First female to clerk for a Supreme Court of Montana justice: Betty Ann Sias (1945)

=== Federal judges ===
- First female (federal magistrate): Carolyn Ostby (1981) in 2002
- First female (U.S. District Court of Montana): Susan P. Watters (1988) in 2014

=== State judges ===
- First female (Chief Justice; Montana Supreme Court): Karla M. Gray (1976) in 2000
- First female (Montana Supreme Court): Diane Barz (1968) in 1989
- First Native American (Navajo) female elected (justice court): Joey Jayne
- First female (youngest): Shannen Rossmiller in 2000

=== Montana Judicial Court ===
- Karen Townsend: First female elected as a Judge of the Fourth Judicial District (2011) Missoula and Mineral Counties, Montana
- First female (Twelfth Judicial District): Kaydee Snipes Ruiz (2011) in 2019
- First female (Thirteenth Judicial District): Diane Barz (1968) in 1978
- First female (Twentieth Judicial District): Deborah “Kim” Christopher in 2000

=== Assistant Attorney General ===
- First female: Ella Knowles Haskell (1888) in 1893

=== United States Attorney ===
- First female: Doris Swords Poppler (1948) in 1990

=== County Attorney ===
- First female: Emily E. Sloan (1919) in 1924

=== State Bar of Montana ===
- First female admitted: Edna Rankin McKinnon (1919)
- First female president: Sherry Scheel Matteucci

== Firsts in local history ==
- Kitty Curtis: First female judge in Flathead County, Montana (1994)
- Holly Brown: First female district court judge in Gallatin County, Montana
- Colleen Herrington: First female chief judge (2023) in Gallatin County, Montana
- Deborah Kim Christopher: First female to serve as the Lake County Attorney, Montana (1991). In 2000, she became the first female judge of the Twentieth Judicial District.
- Jennifer Boatwright-Lint: First female to serve as a district court judge in Ravalli County, Montana (2018)

== See also ==
- List of first women lawyers and judges in the United States
- Timeline of women lawyers in the United States
- Women in law

== Other topics of interest ==
- List of first minority male lawyers and judges in the United States
- List of first minority male lawyers and judges in Montana
