= 2024 Clerk of the Montana Supreme Court election =

2024 Montana Supreme Court Clerk election
- November 5, 2024
Nominee	Bowen Greenwood	Erin Farris-Olsen
Party	Republican	Democratic
Popular vote	330,503	226,105
Percentage	56.86%	38.90%
- Greenwood: 40–50% 50–60% 60–70% 70–80% 80–90% >90% Farris-Olsen: 40–50% 50–60% 60–70%
Clerk of the Montana Supreme Court before election
Bowen Greenwood
Republican
Elected Clerk of the Montana Supreme Court
Bowen Greenwood
Republican

The 2024 Montana Supreme Court Clerk election was held on November 5, 2024, to elect the Clerk of the Supreme Court of the state of Montana. It coincided with the concurrent presidential election, as well as various state and local elections, including for U.S. Senate, U.S. House, and governor of Montana. Incumbent Republican Clerk Bowen Greenwood was re-elected to a second term in office, defeating Democratic challenger Erin Farris-Olsen. Primary elections took place on June 4, 2024.

== Republican primary ==
=== Candidates ===
==== Nominee ====
- Bowen Greenwood, incumbent clerk

==== Eliminated in primary ====
- Jason Ellsworth, president of the Montana Senate

=== Results ===
Results by county Greenwood: 50–60%; Ellsworth: 50–60%; 60–70%

Republican primary results
Party	Candidate	Votes	%
Republican	Bowen Greenwood	83,379	52.65%
Republican	Jason Ellsworth	74,999	47.35%
Total votes		158,378	100.00%

== Democratic primary ==
=== Candidates ===
==== Nominee ====
- Erin Farris-Olsen, former law clerk for the Montana Supreme Court

==== Eliminated in primary ====
- Jordan Ophus

=== Results ===
Results by county Farris-Olsen: 50–60%; 60–70%; 70–80%; 80–90%; 90–100%

Democratic primary results
Party	Candidate	Votes	%
Democratic	Erin Farris-Olsen	75,038	82.78%
Democratic	Jordan Ophus	15,612	17.22%
Total votes		90,650	100.00%

== General election ==
=== Results ===
2024 Montana Supreme Court Clerk election
Party	Candidate	Votes	%
Republican	Bowen Greenwood	330,503	56.86%
Democratic	Erin Farris-Olsen	226,105	38.90%
Libertarian	Roger Roots	24,639	4.24%
Total votes		581,247	100.00%
Republican hold			

==== By county ====
County	Bowen Greenwood Republican		Erin Farris-Olsen Democratic		Roger Roots Libertarian		Margin		Total
County	Votes	%	Votes	%	Votes	%	Votes	%	Total
Beaverhead	3,862	69.41%	1,458	26.20%	244	4.39%	2,404	43.21%	5,564
Big Horn	1,892	43.23%	2,318	52.96%	167	3.82%	-426	-9.73%	4,377
Blaine	1,355	45.87%	1,481	50.14%	118	3.99%	-126	-4.27%	2,954
Broadwater	3,533	75.90%	916	19.68%	206	4.43%	2,617	56.22%	4,655
Carbon	4,563	63.52%	2,333	32.48%	287	4.00%	2,230	31.05%	7,183
Carter	718	88.10%	67	8.22%	30	3.68%	651	79.88%	815
Cascade	21,142	58.23%	13,636	37.56%	1,531	4.22%	7,506	20.67%	36,309
Chouteau	1,766	63.39%	919	32.99%	101	3.63%	847	30.40%	2,786
Custer	3,941	70.56%	1,365	24.44%	279	5.00%	2,576	46.12%	5,585
Daniels	720	79.47%	159	17.55%	27	2.98%	561	61.92%	906
Dawson	3,378	75.79%	874	19.61%	205	4.60%	2,504	56.18%	4,457
Deer Lodge	2,014	42.71%	2,478	52.54%	224	4.75%	-464	-9.84%	4,716
Fallon	1,220	85.98%	157	11.06%	42	2.96%	1,063	74.91%	1,419
Fergus	4,745	73.33%	1,466	22.65%	260	4.02%	3,279	50.67%	6,471
Flathead	39,374	64.70%	19,102	31.39%	2,380	3.91%	20,272	33.31%	60,856
Gallatin	30,597	46.04%	32,822	49.39%	3,042	4.58%	-2,225	-3.35%	66,461
Garfield	695	92.54%	37	4.93%	19	2.53%	658	87.62%	751
Glacier	1,660	33.21%	3,113	62.28%	225	4.50%	-1,453	-29.07%	4,998
Golden Valley	425	82.85%	70	13.65%	18	3.51%	355	69.20%	513
Granite	1,433	69.23%	557	26.91%	80	3.86%	876	42.32%	2,070
Hill	3,504	53.49%	2,702	41.25%	345	5.27%	802	12.24%	6,551
Jefferson	5,269	65.20%	2,475	30.63%	337	4.17%	2,794	34.57%	8,081
Judith Basin	987	75.57%	265	20.29%	54	4.13%	722	55.28%	1,306
Lake	9,334	57.15%	6,323	38.72%	675	4.13%	3,011	18.44%	16,332
Lewis and Clark	20,210	49.33%	19,114	46.65%	1,645	4.02%	1,096	2.68%	40,969
Liberty	699	74.20%	208	22.08%	35	3.72%	491	52.12%	942
Lincoln	8,524	74.60%	2,482	21.72%	421	3.68%	6,042	52.87%	11,427
Madison	4,361	70.67%	1,573	25.49%	237	3.84%	2,788	45.18%	6,171
McCone	877	84.00%	130	12.45%	37	3.54%	747	71.55%	1,044
Meagher	816	72.34%	262	23.23%	50	4.43%	554	49.11%	1,128
Mineral	1,896	70.17%	653	24.17%	153	5.66%	1,243	46.00%	2,702
Missoula	25,438	36.26%	41,632	59.34%	3,087	4.40%	-16,194	-23.08%	70,157
Musselshell	2,431	82.97%	393	13.41%	106	3.62%	2,038	69.56%	2,930
Park	5,718	50.39%	5,041	44.43%	588	5.18%	677	5.97%	11,347
Petroleum	265	84.39%	40	12.74%	9	2.87%	225	71.66%	314
Phillips	1,678	79.41%	370	17.51%	65	3.08%	1,308	61.90%	2,113
Pondera	1,847	67.71%	790	28.96%	91	3.34%	1,057	38.75%	2,728
Powder River	893	85.45%	119	11.39%	33	3.16%	774	74.07%	1,045
Powell	2,281	72.21%	684	21.65%	194	6.14%	1,597	50.55%	3,159
Prairie	518	78.84%	117	17.81%	22	3.35%	401	61.04%	657
Ravalli	19,602	68.00%	8,120	28.17%	1,103	3.83%	11,482	39.83%	28,825
Richland	4,063	80.46%	768	15.21%	219	4.34%	3,295	65.25%	5,050
Roosevelt	1,760	46.63%	1,848	48.97%	166	4.40%	-88	-2.33%	3,774
Rosebud	2,291	63.75%	1,137	31.64%	166	4.62%	1,154	32.11%	3,594
Sanders	5,782	74.26%	1,677	21.54%	327	4.20%	4,105	52.72%	7,786
Sheridan	1,196	68.34%	477	27.26%	77	4.40%	719	41.09%	1,750
Silver Bow	6,933	39.96%	9,573	55.17%	845	4.87%	-2,640	-15.22%	17,351
Stillwater	4,500	77.77%	1,056	18.25%	230	3.98%	3,444	59.52%	5,786
Sweet Grass	1,686	73.11%	506	21.94%	114	4.94%	1,180	51.17%	2,306
Teton	2,373	69.20%	933	27.21%	123	3.59%	1,440	41.99%	3,429
Toole	1,452	74.08%	421	21.48%	87	4.44%	1,031	52.60%	1,960
Treasure	353	83.06%	62	14.59%	10	2.35%	291	68.47%	425
Valley	2,750	70.69%	967	24.86%	173	4.45%	1,783	45.84%	3,890
Wheatland	791	75.33%	211	20.10%	48	4.57%	580	55.24%	1,050
Wibaux	419	81.04%	81	15.67%	17	3.29%	338	65.38%	517
Yellowstone	47,973	60.88%	27,567	34.98%	3,260	4.14%	20,406	25.90%	78,800
Totals	330,503	56.86%	226,105	38.90%	24,639	4.24%	104,398	17.96%	581,247

==== Counties that flipped from Democratic to Republican ====
- Hill (largest city: Havre)
- Lewis and Clark (largest city: Helena)

==== By congressional district ====
Greenwood won both congressional districts.

District	Greenwood	Farris-Olsen	Representative
1st	53%	43%	Ryan Zinke
2nd	61%	34%	Matt Rosendale (118th Congress)
2nd	61%	34%	Troy Downing (119th Congress)
