= List of state chief justices =

The following is a list of state-level chief justices in the United States, who must deal with many issues, including "courts are operating in an increasingly complex, high-pressure environment, yet remain committed to fairness, accessibility, and the rule of law."

State	Chief Justice	Since
Alabama	Sarah H. Stewart	2025
Alaska	Peter J. Maassen	2023
Arizona	Robert Brutinel	2019
Arkansas	Dan Kemp	2017
California	Patricia Guerrero	2023
Colorado	Monica Márquez	2024
Connecticut	Richard Robinson	2018
Delaware	Collins Seitz	2019
Florida	Carlos G. Muñiz	2022
Georgia	Michael P. Boggs	2022
Hawaii	Sabrina McKenna (acting)	2025
Idaho	G. Richard Bevan	2021
Illinois	Mary Jane Theis	2022
Indiana	Loretta Rush	2014
Iowa	Susan Christensen	2020
Kansas	Marla Luckert	2019
Kentucky	Laurance B. VanMeter	2023
Louisiana	John L. Weimer	2021
Maine	Valerie Stanfill	2021
Maryland	Matthew J. Fader	2022
Massachusetts	Kimberly S. Budd	2020
Michigan	Elizabeth T. Clement	2022
Minnesota	Natalie Hudson	2023
Mississippi	Michael Randolph	2019
Missouri	Mary Rhodes Russell	2023
Montana	Cory Swanson	2025
Nebraska	Jeffrey J. Funke	2024
Nevada	Elissa Cadish	2024
New Hampshire	Gordon J. MacDonald	2021
New Jersey	Stuart Rabner	2007
New Mexico	C. Shannon Bacon	2022
New York	Rowan D. Wilson	2023
North Carolina	Paul Martin Newby	2021
North Dakota	Jon J. Jensen	2020
Ohio	Sharon L. Kennedy	2022
Oklahoma	M. John Kane IV	2023
Oregon	Meagan Flynn	2023
Pennsylvania	Debra Todd	2022
Rhode Island	Paul Suttell	2009
South Carolina	Donald Beatty	2017
South Dakota	Steven R. Jensen	2021
Tennessee	Roger A. Page	2021
Texas	Jimmy Blacklock	2025
Utah	Matthew Durrant	2012
Vermont	Paul Reiber	2004
Virginia	S. Bernard Goodwyn	2022
Washington	Steven González	2021
West Virginia	Tim Armstead	2024
Wisconsin	Annette Ziegler	2021
Wyoming	Lynne J. Boomgaarden	2025
