= Justice McDonough =

Justice McDonough may refer to:

- R. C. McDonough (1924–2018), associate justice of the Montana Supreme Court
- Roger I. McDonough (1892–1966), associate justice and chief justice of the Utah Supreme Court
