= Robert L. Word =

American judge

Robert Lee Word (June 22, 1866 – March 21, 1945) was a justice of the Montana Supreme Court from 1900 to 1901.

Born in Virginia City, Montana, Word graduated from Columbia Law School in 1891, gaining admission to the Montana Bar prior to his graduation, in 1890. He served as Clerk of the Court from 1887 to 1889 and in 1900 Governor Robert Burns Smith appointed Word to a seat on the Montana Supreme Court vacated by the resignation of Judge William Henry Hunt. Word, then 33 years old, was the youngest person to serve on the court to that date. He assumed office on June 4, 1900, and served as an associate justice until 1901. He was appointed to be District Judge of the 1st judicial district on August 7, 1915 by Governor Sam V. Stewart to fill the unexpired term of J. Miller Smith, remaining in that position until 1920.

Word married Augusta Jones, in 1900, with whom he had three children. Word died at the age of 79.

Political offices
Preceded by Isaac R. Alden	Clerk of the Montana Supreme Court; 1887–1889	Succeeded by William J. Kennedy
Preceded by William Henry Hunt	Justice of the Montana Supreme Court; 1900–1901	Succeeded by George R. Milburn
