= 2018 Clerk of the Montana Supreme Court election =

2018 Montana Supreme Court Clerk election
- November 6, 2018

Nominee	Bowen Greenwood	Rex Renk	Roger Roots
Party	Republican	Democratic	Libertarian
Popular vote	247,130	204,411	28,760
Percentage	51.45%	42.56%	5.99%
- County results Greenwood: 40–50% 50–60% 60–70% 70–80% 80–90% Renk: 40–50% 50–60% 60–70% 70–80%
Clerk of the Montana Supreme Court before election
Ed Smith
Democratic
Elected Clerk of the Montana Supreme Court
Bowen Greenwood
Republican

The 2018 Montana Supreme Court Clerk election was held on November 6, 2018, to elect the Clerk of the Montana Supreme Court. The election was part of the 2018 Montana elections.

Incumbent Democratic Clerk Ed Smith opted not to run for re-election. Republican Bowen Greenwood and Democrat Rex Renk won their respective primaries uncontested.

== Democratic primary ==
=== Candidates ===
==== Declared ====
- Rex Renk, deputy clerk of the Montana Supreme Court

==== Declined ====
- Ed Smith, incumbent

=== Results ===
Democratic primary results
Party	Candidate	Votes	%
Democratic	Rex Renk	95,361	100.0
Total votes		95,361	100.0

== Republican primary ==
=== Candidates ===
==== Declared ====
- Bowen Greenwood, communications director for the Montana Public Service Commission

=== Results ===
Republican primary results
Party	Candidate	Votes	%
Republican	Bowen Greenwood	124,567	100.0
Total votes		124,567	100.0

== General election ==
=== Campaign ===
The campaign for the office was relatively low-profile compared to those for United States Senate and United States House of Representatives. Democratic nominee Rex Renk ran on his experience as deputy clerk, and argued that the office should be non-partisan, as the role is non-political. Republican nominee Bowen Greenwood agreed that the office's work is non-partisan but said that Montanans may want to elect someone who shares their values in non-partisan offices as well. Libertarian nominee Roger Roots said that he would work to "maximize the right of the individual" if elected.

Renk's campaign mascot was a Tyrannosaurus rex.

=== Endorsements ===
Rex Renk (D)

Statewide officials

- Ed Smith, incumbent Clerk of the Montana Supreme Court

Newspapers and other media

- The Missoulian
Bowen Greenwood (R)

State legislators

- Russell Fagg, district judge in Yellowstone County, Montana (1995–2017) and state representative from the 89th district (1991–1995)

=== Results ===
2018 Montana Supreme Court Clerk election
Party	Candidate	Votes	%	±%
Republican	Bowen Greenwood	247,130	51.45	+51.45%
Democratic	Rex Renk	204,411	42.56	−14.31%
Libertarian	Roger Roots	28,760	5.99	−37.14%
Total votes		480,301	100.0	N/A
Republican gain from Democratic				
