= Attorney General McGrath =

Attorney General McGrath may refer to:

- J. Howard McGrath (1903–1966), Attorney General of the United States
- Mike McGrath (judge) (born 1947), Attorney General of Montana
