= William E. Hunt =

American judge

William Edward Hunt, Sr.

Associate Justice of the Montana Supreme Court
- In office January 2, 1985 – December 31, 2000
- Preceded by: Daniel J. Shea
- Succeeded by: Patricia O'Brien Cotter

Personal details
- Born: February 28, 1923 Tacoma, Washington, U.S.
- Died: February 16, 2016 (aged 92) Helena, Montana, U.S.
- Spouse: Mary (m. 1952)
- Children: 5
- Education: BA, JD
- Alma mater: University of Montana; University of Montana School of Law

William Edward Hunt, Sr. (February 28, 1923 – February 16, 2016) was an American soldier, lawyer, and jurist. He served as the County Attorney for Liberty County, Montana, and later as the mayor of Chester, Montana. During his tenure as mayor, he founded the Montana Consumers Council. From 1970 to 1975, he served as the Director of the Montana Aeronautics Commission (which later became the Aeronautics Division of the Montana Department of Transportation). He was appointed the first Montana Workers' Compensation Court judge in July 1975, organizing the court and serving until August 1981. He won a nonpartisan election as an associate justice of the Montana Supreme Court in 1984, and served from January 2, 1985, until his retirement on December 31, 2000.

== Early life and military service ==
Hunt was born on February 28, 1923, in Tacoma, Washington, to William C. and Ann (née Nolan) Hunt, the second of eight children. (Note: His siblings included Eileen, Bob, Don, Mary Jane, Larry, Janet, and Dick.) His father was a dentist and his mother was a registered nurse, and the family was prosperous. During the Great Depression, William C. Hunt could no longer earn enough money as a dentist to provide for his family, so the Hunts moved to a farm owned by the Nolan family near Burlington, Iowa, where they were able to survive by growing their own food.

Hunt dropped out of high school at the age of 16. Declaring he was born February 29, 1920, he enlisted in the Iowa Army National Guard in April 1939. He was assigned to the somewhat newly-organized 113th Cavalry, which at that time still exclusively used horses. The 113th Cavalry began conversion into a combined horse-armored unit in September 1940 and was mobilized into federal service on January 13, 1941. Hunt trained as a radio operator, and participated in the United States Army's landing in Algeria and Sicily before being among the first wave of soldiers going ashore at Utah Beach as part of the Normandy Landings on June 6, 1944. He later said about the war, "If it taught me anything, it taught me how lucky I was. The war taught me we're all the same. We all do our best, and we can't worry about our differences." Another formative experience for Hunt was exposure to the racial segregation faced by African American soldiers during the war, which deeply troubled him. Hunt mustered out of the army in 1945, but reenlisted in 1946. He served in the United States Army Reserve and the Montana Army National Guard until 1950. He graduated from the Army Officer Candidate School, and rose to the rank of captain.

== Education and legal career ==
=== County offices and advocate ===
While in the military, Hunt obtained his GED. Hunt decided to enroll in college using the benefits due to him under the G.I. Bill, and had settled on the University of Washington. His mother suggested that, while traveling to Seattle, Hunt stop at the University of Montana to check out an alternative. Hunt met with a dean at the school, who convinced him to stay in Missoula. To support himself in college, Hunt worked as a "crew caller" for the Northern Pacific Railway, contacting off-duty train crews to tell them to report to work, bumping them from assignments, and sometimes laying them off. Hunt received his combined BA/JD degree in 1955.

Hunt, by now married, moved to Walla Walla, Washington, to practice law, but a short time later moved his practice to Havre, Montana. Hunt then won a position in 1960 as the county attorney for nearby Liberty County, Montana. He and his family moved to Chester, the county seat. Hunt won election as mayor of the town of Chester, and served from May 1, 1967, to April 30, 1969. While serving as mayor of Chester, Hunt became concerned as the Montana Power Company raised rates more than six-fold in two years. Hunt subsequently formed the Montana Consumer Council in 1968 as a means of raising funds to investigate the rate increase as well as providing a voice for consumers in the state. Hunt was the organization's first executive director. (Note: From 1967 to 1969, Hunt worked closely with Montana consumer rights attorney W. William Leaphart, who served on the Montana Supreme Court from 1995 to 2010.) The deficiencies in protecting consumer interests which were exposed by the Montana Consumer Council led to the creation of a state consumers' counsel office in the 1972 Constitution of Montana.

In 1970, Hunt was named a trustee of Central Montana Legal Services, a nonprofit organization which provides legal services to the indigent and poor. He and his family moved to Helena that year. Later that year, Montana Governor Forrest H. Anderson appointed Hunt the Director of the Montana Aeronautics Commission. Montana voters adopted a new state constitution in 1972. The Aeronautics Commission became the Aeronautics Division of the Montana Department of Transportation, and Hunt oversaw the transition from independent agency to division within a larger department.

=== Montana Workers' Compensation Court judge ===
Hunt was named the first Montana Workers' Compensation Court judge in 1975. Initially, after adoption of the 1972 state constitution, the Montana Legislature established an Industrial Accident Board within the new Montana Department of Labor and Industry to both run the state workers' compensation insurance fund and to adjudicate the claims of injured workers. This conflict of interest led to denial and approval of injury awards which were not based on facts, lump-sum payments to workers, improper and inappropriate internal procedures, poor recordkeeping, and the increasing personal involvement of the board's administrator in disputes. Courts began overturning board decisions with increasing frequency, and began fining and punishing the agency. After a state audit of the board revealed the extent of these problems, the state legislature passed a bill in 1975 which established a quasi-judicial Workers' Compensation Court to separate the adjudication function of the agency from its administrative and fiduciary duties.

Governor Thomas Judge nominated Hunt to be the first Workers' Compensation Court judge. Hunt was confirmed by the Montana Senate and served in that capacity from July 1975 to August 1981. Hunt became known statewide as "The Flying Judge" for his extensive travels around the state of Montana holding workers' compensation court hearings. After retiring as Workers' Compensation Court judge in 1981, Hunt returned to the private practice of law in Helena.

=== Montana Supreme Court ===
In 1984, Hunt ran for the position of Associate Justice of the Montana Supreme Court after Justice Daniel J. Shea declined to seek reelection. Article VII, Section 8 of the state constitution provides for the nonpartisan election, rather than appointment, of Montana Supreme Court justices. In 1935, the state legislature enacted legislation barring political parties from endorsing, making contributions to, or making expenditures on behalf of or against judicial candidates. Hunt ran in a crowded primary field, which included Doris Swords Poppler, a former Yellowstone County Attorney and one of the most prominent women lawyers in the state; Joe R. Roberts, Montana Assistant Attorney General; Donald D. McIntyre, Chief Legal Counsel for the Montana Department of Natural Resources and Conservation; and Patricia M. Springer, an attorney. Poppler won the nonpartisan primary with 34.3 percent of the vote (46,659 votes). Hunt came in second place with 19.0 percent of the vote (25,906 votes), beating Joe R. Roberts by a razor-thin margin (18.8 percent of the votes; 25,555 votes). Per state law, the top two vote-getters advanced to the general election. In the general election campaign, Hunt asked voters to consider his experiences as an elected official and judge. "I think I have acquired some knowledge, a great deal of compassion and perhaps a little wisdom," he said. In the general election, Hunt won 54.6 percent of the vote (184,935) to Poppler's 45.4 percent (153,602 votes).

Hunt ran unopposed for a second term in 1992. Under Montana state law, judges in uncontested nonpartisan primary elections automatically advance to the general election. The general election then becomes a choice of "retain/do not retain". Hunt was retained by Montana voters with 68.2 percent of the vote (232,640 votes).

Hunt was widely perceived as a liberal on a court with a strong conservative majority in his first term, when he was often in minority. Although he did not often write decisions, Justice Hunt was often assigned the task of writing decisions when he voted with the majority. In the 1990s, the court gained a liberal majority. Former law clerks said that Hunt used the gray areas of the law to protect individuals, the powerless, the poor, and minorities. Hunt described his judicial philosophy differently: "I'm a liberal and you guys call me a liberal. I think a liberal is a person who has had a lot of experience and is not bound by what happened in the past, but understands the past." While Hunt said judges had to interpret the law as written, he also emphasized that laws are enforced in the real world. Total objectivity by judges was not possible, and the best judges were those with extensive experiences. Montana Supreme Court Associate Justice Terry N. Trieweiler noted that Hunt wrote several important decisions regarding employer accountability in worker injury cases, consumers' rights, environmental law, and civil liberties. Associate Justice Jim Regnier observed that Hunt was widely praised in the legal community for acting as a mentor to young attorneys while an associate justice.

The 77-year-old Hunt declined to seek reelection in 2000, and retired from the Montana Supreme Court. He was succeeded by Patricia O'Brien Cotter.

== Awards and honors ==
The Montana Trial Lawyers Association gave Hunt three awards. The first two were its Public Service and Career Achievement awards, given in 2000, and the third was its Citizens Award, presented in 2007. Hunt received the Jeannette Rankin Public Service Award from the Montana chapter of the ACLU in 2009.

In 2003, William E. Hunt was inducted into the U.S. Army Officer Candidate School Hall of Honor.

== Personal life and death ==
=== Personal life ===
William E. Hunt, Sr. was a lifelong Catholic.

Hunt married Mary V. Fassler of Melrose, Montana, on August 25, 1952. She was a registered nurse who had recently graduated from the St. Patrick School of Nursing at St. Patrick Hospital in Missoula. She died of natural causes on December 29, 2009.

The Hunts had five children: Joseph, James, Katherine, Patricia, and William E. Jr. Joseph Hunt died of cancer in 1998.

=== Death ===
Hunt suffered from frail health in the last several years of his life, and lived at the Rocky Mountain Care Center nursing home in Helena after 2012. He died of natural causes on February 16, 2016. His funeral was held at the Cathedral of Saint Helena in Helena, Montana, and he was interred at Resurrection Cemetery outside the city.

== Electoral history ==
Legal offices
Preceded by Daniel J. Shea	Associate Justice of the Montana Supreme Court; 1984–2000	Succeeded by Patricia Cotter

=== 1984 ===
1984 Montana Supreme Court, Seat #3, Primary Election
Party	Candidate	Votes	%
Nonpartisan	Doris Swords Poppler	46,659	34.3
Nonpartisan	William E. Hunt, Sr.	25,906	19.0
Nonpartisan	Joe R. Roberts	25,555	18.8
Nonpartisan	Donald D. McIntyre	22,029	16.2
Nonpartisan	Patricia M. Springer	16,059	11.8

1984 Montana Supreme Court, Seat #3, General Election
Party	Candidate	Votes	%
Nonpartisan	William E. Hunt, Sr.	184,935	54.6
Nonpartisan	Doris Swords Poppler	153,602	45.4

=== 1992 ===
1992 Montana Supreme Court, Seat #3, General Election
Party	Candidate	Votes	%
Nonpartisan	Retain	232,640	68.2
Nonpartisan	Do not retain	198,460	31.8

== Bibliography ==
- Clay, Steven E. (2010). US Army Order of Battle, 1919–1941. Fort Leavenworth, Kan.: Combat Studies Institute Press. hdl:2027/mdp.39015087426675. ISBN 9780984190140.
- Doty, Russell Leigh (1970). Consumers' Council: Countervailing Power to Montana Power? (M.A. thesis). University of Montana. CiteSeerX 10.1.1.946.6196.
- Elison, Larry M.; Snyder, Fritz (2001). The Montana State Constitution: A Reference Guide. Westport, Conn.: Greenwood Press. ISBN 9780313273469.
- Hunt, William E.; Luinstra, Gregory A. (Winter 1980). "The Montana Workers' Compensation Court: A Status Report". Montana Law Review: 1–20.
- Iowa Adjutant General (1941). Supplemental Report of the Adjutant General. Iowa. 1941. Induction Roster of Personnel, Iowa National Guard (Report). Des Moines, Ia.: Iowa Adjutant General's Office.
- Martindale-Hubbell Law Directory. New York: Martindale-Hubbell Law Directory. 1969.
- Menden, Joe (March 2016). "Longtime Justice Remembered for Ruling From Heart". Montana Lawyer. pp. 10–11.
- Montana Supreme Court (1991). Annual Report of the Montana Judicial System: Calendar Year 1991 (PDF) (Report). Helena, Mont.: Office of the Court Administrator.
- Murdo, Pat (August 17, 2016). Workers' Compensation Court and Judge (PDF) (Report). Helena, Mont.: Montana Legislative Services Division.
- Rausch, John David Jr. (2006). "Montana". In Hogan, Sean O. (ed.). The Judicial Branch of State Government: People, Process, and Politics. Santa Barbara, Calif.: ABC-CLIO. ISBN 9781851097562.
- Rottman, Gordon L.; Dennis, Peter (2012). World War II US Cavalry Groups: European Theater. Botley, Oxford, UK: Osprey Publishing. ISBN 9781849087971.
