= Dirk Sandefur =

American judge (born 1961)

Associate Justice of the Montana Supreme Court
- In office January 2, 2017 – January 2, 2025
- Preceded by: Patricia O'Brien Cotter
- Succeeded by: Katherine M. Bidegaray

Personal details
- Born: October 22, 1961 (age 65) Great Falls, Montana, U.S.
- Party: Democratic
- Spouse: Julie (m. 2019)
- Children: 3
- Education: University of Montana (BS, JD)

Dirk M. Sandefur (born October 22, 1961) is an American lawyer who served as an associate justice of the Montana Supreme Court from 2017 to 2025. He served for eight years as a criminal and civil deputy attorney for Cascade County, Montana, before being elected a judge on the 8th Judicial District of the Montana District Court in 2002. He ran for and won election to the Montana Supreme Court in 2016.

== Early life and education ==
Dirk Sandefur was born on October 22, 1961, in Great Falls, Montana, to Glenn and Kathleen (née Kirwan) Sandefur. He has two siblings, Penny (a sister) and Pat (a brother). His father was a Korean War veteran who became an auto body mechanic and classic car restorer, and his mother a homemaker.

Sandefur attended Great Falls High School, where he graduated with honors in 1980. He then enrolled at the University of Montana in Missoula, graduating (with honors) in 1985 with a Bachelor of Science degree in computer science.

Sandefur worked as an aide to a construction inspector with the United States Army Corps of Engineers at Malmstrom Air Force Base from 1984 to 1986. In 1987, he moved to Havre, Montana, graduated from the Montana Law Enforcement Academy, and became a police officer. In 1990, Sandefur entered the Alexander Blewett III School of Law at the University of Montana (UM Law School). Now married and with children, Sandefur worked full-time while attending law school. He graduated with high honors in 1993, third in his class of 75.

== Legal career ==
Sandefur was admitted to the State Bar of Montana in 1993. He worked for a year as an associate in private practice, and in 1994 took a position as a contract public defender with the Office of the State Public Defender. In 1994, Sandefur became a Deputy Cascade County Attorney, at first prosecuting criminal cases and later serving as Chief Civil Deputy Attorney, overseeing matters such as contracts, education and school law, election law, employment law, law enforcement, property tax disputes, property transactions, real estate subdivision, tort claims, and zoning. He also served concurrently as general counsel to the county.

In 2002, the Montana Legislature added a fourth judge to the 8th Judicial District of the Montana District Court. In a four-way nonpartisan primary race, Sandefur won with 40.6 percent of the vote. As per state law, the top two vote-getters advanced to the general election. In a hotly contested race. Sandefur beat E. Lee Leveque for a six-year term as district court judge, 54.4 to 45.6 percent.

Under Montana state law, judges in uncontested nonpartisan primary elections automatically advance to the general election. The general election then becomes a choice of "retain/do not retain". Sandefur ran unopposed in the 2008 primary, and was retained by a vote of 85.2 to 14.8 percent. Sandefur was unopposed again in the 2014 primary election, and was retained by a vote of 88.7 to 11.3 percent.

The 8th Judicial District is Montana's third-busiest district court. According to an independent study, Sandefur annually disposed of twice the number of cases expected for a judge. Cascade County Attorney John Parker later said Sandefur garnered a reputation for being a tough but fair jurist. On occasion, he also served as a substitute justice on the Montana Supreme Court.

== Montana Supreme Court ==
=== 2016 primary election ===
In 2015, Associate Justice Patricia O'Brien Cotter announced she would not seek re-election. On February 5, 2015, Sandefur filed to run for Cotter's seat. Over the next six weeks, Sandefur raised $46,431, and spent $2,834. The Bozeman Daily Chronicle described it as a "fast out of the gate" fundraising pace.

Sandefur's first opponent emerged in May 2015 when Kristen Juras, a private-practice attorney and former UM Law School adjunct professor, filed for Cotter's seat as well. Supporters of the two candidates reflected the distinct judicial philosophies of Sandefur and Juras. In June, Dave Galt, executive director of the Montana Petroleum Association and secretary-treasurer of the Montana Gas and Oil Political Action Committee, hosted a fundraiser for Juras. Co-hosts included Errol Galt, the Republican National Committee member; Chuck Denowh, executive director of the Montana Republican Party; and staff of the Montana Group, a public relations firm which worked primarily for conservative candidates. About the same time, Sandefur himself hosted a fundraising event which attracted donors such as Jorge Quintana, Democratic National Committee member; Pam Bucy, the Democratic Montana Commissioner of Labor and Industry; and Maggie Moran, executive director of NARAL Pro-Choice Montana. Over the next six months, Sandefur raised about $100,000, leaving him with $133,000 cash on hand. Juras raised $41,000, leaving her with $22,400 cash on hand. Both candidates found strong support in the legal and business communities. By the end of 2015, Sandefur had raised a total of $190,115. Juras collected only $48,000, but maintained that she had turned down money because both candidates automatically advanced to the general election unless a third candidate emerged. (State law required judicial candidates to return primary donations if they automatically advanced.) Sandefur countered claims that he was relying on liberal donors by noting that his state election finance report showed 136 Republicans and 124 Democrats among his 902 contributors.

During the primary season, the candidates appeared together only once, in Missoula at a forum in March 2016 sponsored by the American Civil Liberties Union (ACLU).

On March 11, 2016, Eric Mills, a private-practice attorney, also filed for Cotter's Supreme Court seat. (Note: All three candidates were from Great Falls.) By the end of May 2016, Sandefur had raised $248,000 and spent $116,000, while Juras raised $94,000 and $66,000. Mills raised $270.

In the June 7, 2016, nonpartisan primary, Juras won 44.1 percent of the votes (100,846), Sandefur received 34.5 percent of the votes (78,855), and Mills was last with 21.4 percent of the vote (48,965). Juras and Sandefur advanced to the general (nonpartisan) election.

=== 2016 general election ===
By the end of August, Sandefur had raised a total of $329,053 in 2015 and 2016, while Juras raised a total of $159,055 in the same period. By this time, MEA-MFT, the Montana AFL-CIO, Montana Conservation Voters, a number of district and municipal court judges, Montana Supreme Court Chief Justice Mike McGrath, retiring Associate Justice Cotter, and 10 retired Montana Supreme Court justices had endorsed Sandefur. Juras, meanwhile, won the endorsements of the Montana Bankers Association, Montana Chamber of Commerce, Montana Contractors Association, and Montana Farm Bureau Federation PAC.

The first general election public forum at which Sandefur and Juras met was in Great Falls on September 7. Juras emphasized her work for farmers, ranches, and small business owners, and claimed Sandefur had injected partisan politics into the race. Sandefur argued Juras had little real courtroom experience, and denigrated at her stand on a number of legal issues (including ongoing litigation over the Montana Stream Access Law). At a Western Montana Bar Association forum a week later, the legal community audience asked tough questions about Juras' position on the stream access law, her legal work for the Crop Growers Insurance (which was under state investigation for money laundering and making illegal campaign contributions), and comments she made on the radio about injecting conservative Judeo-Christian ethics into her legal decision-making. Sandefur strongly attacked Juras' on the same issues.

In the general nonpartisan election held on November 8, 2016, Sandefur received 56.1 percent of the vote (254,811), while Kristen Juras received 43.9 percent of the vote (199,148).

Sandefur's campaign raised more than $504,000 in the race. Pro-Sandefur political action committees raised another $1 million, while the Montana Democratic Party spent $62,000. The Juras campaign raised about $210,000. Pro-Juras political action committees raised another $268,000.

=== Supreme Court term ===
Sandefur was sworn in for an eight-year term on the Montana Supreme Court on January 2, 2017. He stated that he would not run for re-election in 2024.

== Personal life ==
Sandefur has three adult children (son Taylor, daughter Tess, and son Dylan) from a prior marriage and has been married to Julie Sandefur, since 2019.

== Electoral history ==
=== 2002 ===
2002 8th Judicial District, Department D, Montana District Court Primary Election
Party	Candidate	Votes	%
Nonpartisan	Dirk Sandefur	5,736	40.6
Nonpartisan	E. Lee Leveque	3,567	25.2
Nonpartisan	Floyd Corder	2,439	17.3
Nonpartisan	Eric Olson	2,391	16.9

2002 8th Judicial District, Department D, Montana District Court General Election
Party	Candidate	Votes	%
Nonpartisan	Dirk Sandefur	13,565	54.4
Nonpartisan	E. Lee Leveque	11,385	45.6

=== 2008 ===
2008 8th Judicial District, Department D, Montana District Court General Election
Party	Candidate	Votes	%
Nonpartisan	Dirk Sandefur - retain	27,608	85.2
Nonpartisan	Dirk Sandefur - do not retain	4,797	14.8

=== 2014 ===
2014 8th Judicial District, Department D, Montana District Court General Election
Party	Candidate	Votes	%
Nonpartisan	Dirk Sandefur - retain	21,403	88.7
Nonpartisan	Dirk Sandefur - do not retain	2,736	11.3

=== 2016 ===
2016 Montana Supreme Court, Seat #3, Primary Election
Party	Candidate	Votes	%
Nonpartisan	Kristen Juras	100,846	44.1
Nonpartisan	Dirk Sandefur	78,855	34.5
Nonpartisan	Eric Mills	48,965	21.4

2016 Montana Supreme Court, Seat #3, General Election
Party	Candidate	Votes	%
Nonpartisan	Dirk Sandefur	254,811	56.13
Nonpartisan	Kristen Juras	199,148	43.87

== Bibliography ==
- Finn, Marie T.; Irvine, Diana R.; Bliss, Mary Lee; Pratton, Gina L.; Morgan, Samantha (2009). The American Bench: Judges of the Nation. Minneapolis: Reginald Bishop Forster & Associates.

Legal offices
Preceded by Patricia O'Brien Cotter	Associate Justice of the Montana Supreme Court; 2017–2025	Succeeded by Katherine M. Bidegaray
