= Laurie McKinnon =

American judge (born 1960)

Associate Justice of the Montana Supreme Court
- Incumbent
- Assumed office January 2013
- Preceded by: James C. Nelson

Personal details
- Born: January 4, 1960 (age 65) Baltimore, Maryland, U.S.
- Education: Goucher College (BA); University of Baltimore (JD)

Laurie McKinnon (born January 4, 1960) is an associate justice of the Montana Supreme Court. She was elected to her first eight-year term in 2012. In 2020, she defeated Mike Black, gaining a second eight-year term.

== Background ==
McKinnon was born January 4, 1960, in Baltimore, Maryland. She received her Bachelor's degree from Goucher College in 1982. She attended the University of Baltimore School of Law and received her Juris Doctor in 1986.

McKinnon began practicing law in 1987 as a prosecutor in Baltimore for the State's Attorney's Office. She remained there until 1991. After that she started her own practice handling both civil and criminal litigation. In 1995 she moved to Cut Bank, Montana, becoming a Deputy County Attorney for Glacier County from 1996 to 1997. From 1997 to 2000, McKinnon worked in private practice where she focused on criminal defense and general litigation. In 2001, she became Deputy County Attorney for Teton County.

McKinnon ran for, and won, the 2006 election for judge of the 9th Montana District Court. The 9th district is responsible for Teton, Toole, Pondera, and Glacier counties.

In 2010, Court Appointed Special Advocates (CASA) of Montana awarded McKinnon Judge of the Year for her work in cases involving abused and neglected children. In 2011, she received a grant from the United States Department of Justice to implement a drug court within the 9th District Court.

In 2012, McKinnon ran for Montana Supreme Court against Ed Sheehy. Though Supreme Court races in Montana are non-partisan, this election was divided by right and left leaning support groups, with the conservatives backing McKinnon. Attack ads against Sheehy were paid for by Montana Growth Network. In May of 2012, McKinnon had raised $38,000 for her campaign and the organization had already spent $41,000. Considered a dark money group, Montana Growth Network was eventually fined for their involvement in the race.

McKinnon was sworn in to start her eight-year term in January 2013. While completing her duties as a justice, McKinnon developed E-RAMP (Early Resolution and Mediation Project), a cost-free mediation program to help resolve pro se family law cases. She won the Karla M. Gray Equal Justice Award in 2019 due to the program.

The 2020 election race against Mike Black was contentious. Initially, McKinnon stated she would not seek another term. One reason was the potential move of her husband. Another was the controversy regarding attack ads in the 2012 election. McKinnon denied ties to, or knowledge of, the out-of-state funding raised to promote her election and has publicly denounced the attack ads. For his part, Black stated he did not expect to be running against an incumbent, as he filed after McKinnon announced her retirement. That was the same for Mars Scott, who lost in the primaries. In 20 years, only one person defeated an incumbent Montana Supreme Court justice. Black was also concerned about possible interference in the election from dark money groups.

Legal offices
Preceded by James C. Nelson	Justice of the Montana Supreme Court; 2013–present	Incumbent
