= Daniel J. Shea (judge) =

American judge (born 1938)

Daniel J. Shea (born 1938) was a justice of the Montana Supreme Court from 1977 to 1985.

Shea graduated from the Gonzaga University School of Law in 1964, and in 1966 was hired as the deputy county attorney of Missoula County, Montana. Shea ran for county attorney in 1970, coming in last among three contenders in the Democratic primary. He then ran for a seat on the state supreme court in 1976, for which he was successful, defeating Montana Senate Majority Leader Neil J. Lynch in what was described as an upset. He served one term and did not seek reelection. Shea would later explain, when asking a criminal court for leniency for his son on a DUI charge, that he had not run for a second term on the court due to the stress of his divorce in 1983, and his wife's alcoholism. After leaving the bench, Shea returned to private practice, but his license was suspended in 1989 following the mishandling of some cases, and in 2006 he was recommended for disbarment for allegedly practicing law without having had his license restored when he assisted a nonprofit organization with a lawsuit.

Political offices
Preceded by Wesley Castles	Justice of the Montana Supreme Court; 1977-1985	Succeeded by William E. Hunt
