= List of first minority male lawyers and judges in Montana =

This is a list of the first minority male lawyer(s) and judge(s) in Montana. It includes the year in which the men were admitted to practice law (in parentheses). Also included are men who achieved other distinctions, such becoming the first in their state to graduate from law school or become a political figure.

== Firsts in Montana's history ==
=== Lawyers ===
- First African American male: John D. Posten (1890)
- First Native American (Métis) male: Raymond Francis Gray (1946)

=== State judges ===
- First Native American male: Ira Left Hand, Sr.
- First Native American (Confederated Salish & Kootenai Tribes of the Flathead Reservation; Chief Justice of the Supreme Court of Montana): Jean A. Turnage in 1984
- First openly gay male: Shane Vannatta in 2019

=== Federal judges ===
- First African American male (U.S. Commissioner for the United States District Court of Montana): John D. Posten (1890) in 1893

=== Montana State Bar Association ===
- First openly gay male (president): Shane Vannatta in 2011

== Firsts in local history ==
- Leroy Not Afraid: First Native American (Crow Tribe) male justice of the peace in Big Horn County, Montana (2006)
- James Weston Dorsey (1927): First Black male to graduate from the University of Montana School of Law [Missoula County, Montana]

== See also ==
- List of first minority male lawyers and judges in the United States

== Other topics of interest ==
- List of first women lawyers and judges in the United States
- List of first women lawyers and judges in Montana
