= Ryan G. Anderson =

Washington State National Guardsman

Ryan Anderson
- Born: Ryan Gibson Anderson; 1978 (age 47–48); Everett, Washington, U.S.
- Other name: Amir Abdul Rashid
- Education: Washington State University (B.A.)
- Penalty: Life imprisonment

Details
- Imprisoned at: United States Disciplinary Barracks

Ryan Gibson Anderson (born 1978), is an American former Washington State National Guardsman convicted by court-martial on September 3, 2004, on five counts of attempting to provide aid to the terrorist network al-Qaeda. He is currently serving a life sentence in the United States Disciplinary Barracks at Fort Leavenworth, Kansas with the eligibility of parole.

Anderson was a tank crewman and held the rank of Specialist (E-4). He was assigned to the 81st Armored Brigade of the Washington Army National Guard and was preparing for deployment to Iraq when he was arrested in a joint FBI and United States Army Intelligence and Security Command (INSCOM) sting operation on February 12, 2004. At the time of the court-martial verdict, the jury of nine commissioned officers reduced Anderson's rank to private and gave him a dishonorable discharge.

== Background ==
Anderson was born and raised in Everett, Washington. He attended Cascade High School. He then attended Washington State University and majored in history, where he graduated with a Bachelor of Arts degree in 2002. Anderson was married on April 5, 2003, to Erin Wheatley. They met while both attending Washington State University. Erin graduated with a Bachelor of Arts degree in communications, also in 2002. She then moved to Kansas to be closer to her incarcerated husband, attended the University of Missouri-Kansas City from 2007 to 2009 and graduated with a Master's in counseling and guidance.

In 1999, Anderson converted to Islam and adopted the name Amir Abdul Rashid. Prior to his capture, Anderson was seen on a surveillance tape, in which he said, "I wish to desert from the U.S. Army. I wish to defect from the United States. I wish to join al-Qaeda, train its members and conduct terrorist attacks."

== Arrest ==
Anderson was arrested February 12, 2004 after a joint investigation by the United States Army Counterintelligence, and the FBI. They monitored his online activities, such as logging onto extremist Internet chat rooms, trying to get in touch with al-Qaeda operatives, and offering the organization information on United States military capabilities and weaponry. Shortly before his arrest, Anderson was recorded on video surveillance providing tactical information on methods of killing U.S. troops and destroying tanks to undercover agents posing as al-Qaeda operatives. They tapped his and his wife's cell phones, pulled text messages, and followed both him and his wife in their daily lives.

Shannen Rossmiller, a former municipal judge in Conrad, Montana and amateur cyber spy, is credited with first encountering Anderson in an online Islamist chat room. In posts, Anderson offered assistance in gathering information and in killing U.S. soldiers. After ascertaining that Anderson was a member of the U.S. military, Rossmiller contacted the FBI who set up a joint sting operation with the United States Department of Justice and the military.

== Court-martial ==
On September 2, 2004, a military jury found Anderson guilty of five counts of attempting to aid and provide intelligence to the enemy. In his defense, Anderson's lawyers made an insanity plea, offering medical testimony that he has bipolar disorder and Asperger syndrome. They also claimed that he used role-playing to create structure in his life, therefore inducing him into the entrapment created by the authorities. He was given a demotion to the rank of private, a dishonorable discharge, and sentenced to a life sentence, with the possibility of parole.

== See also ==
- List of notable converts to Islam
- Islamist terrorism
- INSCOM
