= James A. Rice =

American judge (born 1957)

Jim Rice

Associate Justice of the Montana Supreme Court
- Incumbent
- Assumed office March 15, 2001
- Governor: Judy Martz
- Preceded by: Karla M. Gray

Personal details
- Born: James Arthur Rice; November 15, 1957 (age 68) CFS Ramore, Canada
- Party: Republican
- Education: Montana State University (BA); University of Montana (JD)

James Arthur Rice (born November 15, 1957) is an American lawyer who has served as an associate justice of the Montana Supreme Court. Rice was initially appointed by Governor Judy Martz in 2001. His current term extends to 2030.

== Early life and education ==
Rice was born to parents in the United States military who were stationed at Ramore Air Station near Kirkland Lake, Ontario, Canada. He grew up in eastern Montana and graduated from Glasgow High School in 1975. He obtained his pilot's license at age 17 and worked in aviation-related jobs while attending Montana State University. He graduated with a Bachelor of Arts in political science in 1979, and then earned a Juris Doctor from the Alexander Blewett III School of Law at the University of Montana in 1982.

== Career ==
Rice began his career as a public defender in Lewis and Clark County, Montana for four years. He became a partner in the law firm Jackson & Rice in Helena, Montana, in 1985.

He was elected as a Republican to three terms in the Montana House of Representatives, serving from 1989 to 1994, serving as the House Majority whip in the 1993 session. Rice's campaigns for Supreme Court referenced his time as a legislator. In the 2013 elections he stated: "I have sensitivity to the separation of powers and deference to the appropriate branches of government. I want to ensure that the court doesn't legislate from the bench and stays within our appropriate role."

After time in the legislature, he was appointed to chair the Board of Personnel Appeals by Governor Marc Racicot. In 2000, Rice ran for Montana Attorney General, losing to Mike McGrath.

On March 15, 2001, he was sworn in as an associate justice of the Montana Supreme Court after appointment by Governor Judy Martz. Rice filled the seat vacated by Karla M. Gray when she was elected Chief Justice of the Montana Supreme Court. In 2002, Rice was unopposed in election to the remainder of the judicial term to which he was appointed. In 2006, he also won an unopposed retention vote. In 2014, he defeated W. David Herbert to win a third term. Then in 2022, he defeated Bill D'Alton to continue his tenure.

Legal offices
Preceded by Karla M. Gray	Justice of the Montana Supreme Court; 2001–present	Incumbent
