= James C. Nelson =

American judge

James Nelson

Associate Justice of the Montana Supreme Court
- In office May 1993 – December 31, 2012
- Nominated by: Marc Racicot
- Succeeded by: Laurie McKinnon

Personal details
- Born: February 20, 1944 (age 82) Moscow, Idaho
- Education: University of Idaho (BS); George Washington University (JD)

Military service
- Branch/service: United States Army
- Rank: First Lieutenant

James C. Nelson (born February 20, 1944) is a retired American attorney and jurist who served as an associate justice of the Montana Supreme Court from 1993 through 2012, having been appointed to the court by Republican Governor Marc Racicot in May 1993.

== Early life and education ==
Born in Moscow, Idaho, Nelson earned his Bachelor of Science degree from the University of Idaho in 1966. After graduating, he served in the United States Army for three years, being discharged as a first lieutenant in 1969 to serve as a financial analyst with the U.S. Securities and Exchange Commission.

== Career ==
After earning his Juris Doctor degree with honors from George Washington University Law School in 1974, he moved to Cut Bank, Montana to take over his father-in-law's law firm. After representing a Native American tribe, the tribe gave him the honorary name of E-E-Nistowas, or Buffalo Body.

During this time, he served as president of the Glacier Chamber of Commerce, chairman of the Montana Board of Oil and Gas Conservation, and a member of the Montana Gaming Advisory Council and the Governor's Task Force on Corrections and Criminal Justice Policy. He served as Glacier County Attorney, the county's top prosecutor, until May 1993 when Republican Governor Marc Racicot (the chairman of George W. Bush's 2004 presidential campaign) appointed Nelson to the Montana Supreme Court.

=== Supreme Court tenure ===
In 1997, Nelson wrote the court's opinion in Gryczan v. State striking down as unconstitutional a law that had criminalized gay sex, six years before the U.S. Supreme Court ruled similarly in Lawrence v. Texas.

In 1997, Nelson wrote the court's opinion in Montana v. Siegal ruling that police usage of thermal imaging technology to find a marijuana growing operation required a search warrant, four years before the U.S. Supreme Court ruled similarly in Kyllo v. United States in a decision written by Justice Antonin Scalia.

In a 2009 child custody case between two same-sex partners, Kulstad v. Maniaci, Nelson gained attention from the media and civil rights groups for his concurring opinion that stated:

Naming it for the evil it is, discrimination on the basis of sexual orientation is an expression of bigotry. And, whether rationalized on the basis of majoritarian morality, partisan ideology, or religious tenets, homophobic discrimination is still bigotry. It cannot be justified; it cannot be legalized; it cannot be constitutionalized ... Lesbian and gay Montanans must not be forced to fight to marry, to raise their children, and to live with the same dignity that is accorded heterosexuals. That lesbian and gay people still must fight for their fundamental rights ... speaks, in unfortunate clarity, of a prevalent societal cancer grounded in bigotry and hate.

In 2010, Nelson wrote the court's unanimous opinion striking down a court rule that had previously prohibited the inclusion of forensic evidence because the medical examiner could not determine the cause of death. Nelson's ruling made it easier for prosecutors to introduce evidence against defendants by discussing past crimes, behaviors, and events. In this particular case, Nelson's ruling enabled prosecutors to bring in evidence of an infant's brain bruising and multiple rib fractures in prosecuting the infant's mother for murder.

== Personal life ==
Nelson and his wife, Chari, have two children, Mary Pat and Jay, and four grandchildren.

== See also ==
- Dark Money

Legal offices
Preceded by R. C. McDonough	Justice of the Montana Supreme Court; May 1993–2012	Succeeded by Laurie McKinnon
