= Shannen Rossmiller =

American online terrorist-hunter (1970–2020)

Shannen Rossmiller (May 31, 1970 – November 9, 2020) was an American lecturer and instructor in cyber counter-intelligence forensics and a former Montana municipal court judge who has had a controversial role as a vigilante online terrorist-hunter, and who was once part of the 7Seas group.

A former high school cheerleader, paralegal, and a mother of three, Rossmiller posed online as militant anti-American Muslim radicals to attract the eye of those with similar mindsets. While still a member of 7-Seas group, she provided evidence that led to the arrest and conviction of Ryan G. Anderson, a National Guardsman who was about to deploy from the U.S. to Iraq. Ryan is now serving a life sentence for seeking to aid the enemy during a time of war and attempted espionage.

In 2005, while posing online as an Al Qaeda financier, Rossmiller offered the transient Michael Reynolds $40,000 to purchase fuel trucks to attack American pipelines. Reynolds was arrested when he attempted to pick up the money. In 2007, he was convicted by a jury of attempting to provide material support to Al Qaeda and related charges, and sentenced to 30 years in jail.

Rossmiller appeared in the 2005 BBC documentary entitled The New al-Qaeda. She, along with other internet cyber sleuths, has been criticized for her work.

She recounted her story in a 2007 article titled "My Cyber Counter-jihad" in Middle East Quarterly. As of July 2007, a publicist was seeking a book or movie deal based on Rossmiller's story, and in 2011 she published a book entitled The Unexpected Patriot.

In November 2020, Shannen died from complications related to Graves' disease.

== See also ==
- List of first women lawyers and judges in Montana
