= Michael W. Cotter =

American attorney

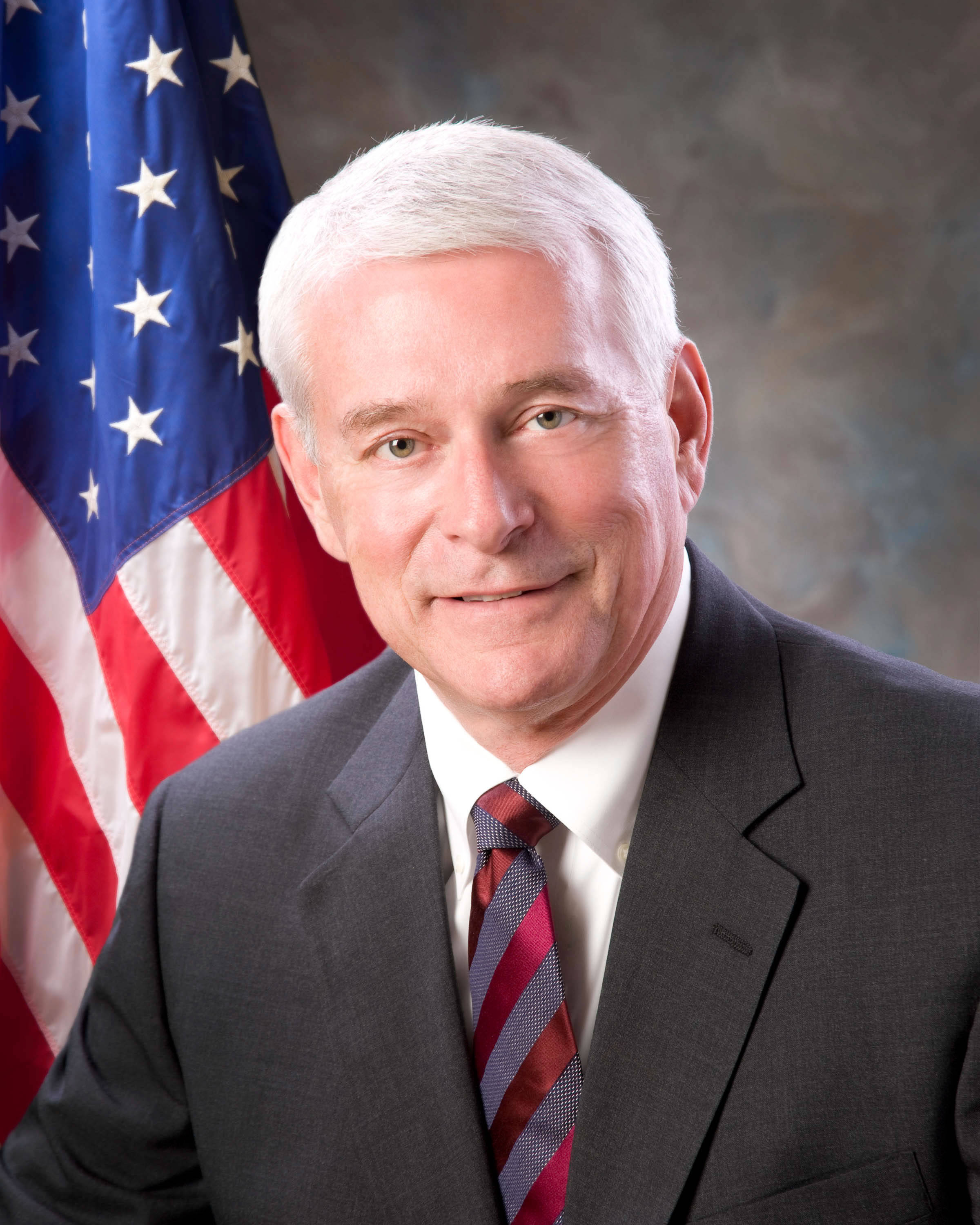

United States Attorney for the District of Montana
- In office December 30, 2009 – March 10, 2017
- President: Barack Obama; Donald Trump
- Preceded by: William W. Mercer
- Succeeded by: Kurt Alme

Personal details
- Born: July 7, 1949 (age 77)
- Party: Democratic
- Spouse: Patricia O'Brien Cotter
- Education: University of Notre Dame (BA, JD); University of Utah (BBA)

Michael W. Cotter (born July 7, 1949) is an American attorney who served as the United States Attorney for the District of Montana from 2009 to 2017.

== Education ==
Cotter graduated from the University of Notre Dame with a Bachelor of Business Administration, received his Master of Business Administration degree from the University of Utah and received his Juris Doctor from the Notre Dame Law School.

== Legal career ==
He began his legal career as an associate at the Law Offices of John C. Hoyt, later forming the Cotter & Cotter Law Firm with his wife, Patricia O'Brien Cotter. From 2000–2009, he was the sole practitioner at Michael W. Cotter, P.C. in Helena, Montana.

== Military service ==
Cotter served on active duty with the United States Army from 1972 to 1974 and was honorably discharged as a First Lieutenant.

== See also ==
- 2017 dismissal of U.S. attorneys
