= Diane Barz =

American judge (1943–2014)

Diana Barz

Associate Justice of the Montana Supreme Court
- Governor: Stan Stephens
- Preceded by: L.C. Gulbrandson
- Succeeded by: Karla M. Gray

Personal details
- Born: August 18, 1943; Bozeman, Montana, U.S.
- Died: May 14, 2014 (aged 70); Billings, Montana, U.S.
- Education: University of Montana School of Law, JD (1968)
- Committees: Youth Court Conference

Diane MacDonald Barz (August 18, 1943 – May 14, 2014) was an American judge. In 1978, she became the first female Montana District Court judge. She was also the first woman to serve as a member of the Montana Supreme Court, a position she held from September 1989 to 1991. She also served as an assistant United States attorney from 1991 to 1994.

== Career ==
Barz received her J.D. degree from University of Montana Law School in 1968. In her law school graduating class, she was the only female graduate. She then became a law clerk in the Montana Supreme Court. After clerking, she became a deputy county attorney. Along with partner Doris Swords Poppler, she formed the first women's law firm in Montana. Then in 1978 she became the first woman elected as a Montana District Court judge, as well as the youngest elected. She was reelected four times to this position. She also served as public defender for Yellowstone County, Montana.

In 1987, she sentenced convicted murderer David Thomas Dawson to death. Dawson was subsequently executed in 2006 and remains the last person executed by the state of Montana.

In 1989, Governor Stan Stephens appointed Barz as an associate justice of the Montana Supreme Court. In 1990, Barz resigned from the court rather than participate in a contested statewide election, serving until 1991. She was an assistant United States attorney from 1991 to 1994. She then again served as Montana District Court judge, serving for 22 years. On the Montana District Court, Barz spent over 15 years running the Youth Court, where she founded the Youth Court Conference Committee to find alternative punishments for young offenders.

Barz retired from the District Court in 2003 but continued to work elsewhere. She conducted two investigations for the University of Montana: a 2004 investigation of the athletic department that found a million dollar shortfall was due to negligence and a 2011 sexual assault investigation that found multiple sexual assault reports and led to a conviction. She described the university as having “a problem of sexual assault on and off campus”. She also served as a temporary judge in several western Montana courts. She was described by the president of the State Bar of Montana as a "smart and competent judge who could be tough."

In 2004, Barz was named a distinguished alumni by the University of Montana.

== Personal life ==
Born in Bozeman, Montana to Bernice (Johnson) MacDonald and World War II pilot John MacDonald, Barz graduated from high school in Concord, California. She then received her bachelor's degree from Whitworth University. She also studied at Heidelberg University in Germany for one year. In 1969, she met her husband, Dan Barz, and married him a year later; they and their dogs hunted birds annually, and she also participated in antelope hunts, fishing, boating, and foraging. Her family provided scholarships to the University of Montana and Montana State University. Barz died in Billings, Montana of cancer, which she was diagnosed with eight years earlier.

== See also ==
- List of female state supreme court justices
- List of first women lawyers and judges in Montana
