= R. C. McDonough =

American judge (1924–2018)

Russell Charles "R. C." McDonough (December 7, 1924 – April 3, 2018) was a justice of the Montana Supreme Court from 1987 to 1993.

== Early life and career ==
Born in Glendive, Montana, McDonough enlisted in the United States Army Air Forces in 1942, to serve in World War II. After the war, he attended Montana State University and received his J.D. from the George Washington University Law School in 1949. He served as the Glendive City Attorney and Dawson County Attorney and was a delegate to the 1972 Montana Constitutional Convention. He was elected district judge in the seventh judicial district in 1982, serving in that capacity until May 1987, when Governor Ted Schwinden appointed McDonough to a seat on the Montana Supreme Court. McDonough retired from the Montana Supreme Court in 1993; though his appointing governor was a Democrat, McDonough resigned during the governorship of Republican Marc Racicot, allowing for a change in the makeup of the court.

== Personal life ==
McDonough married Dora Jean Bidwell, with whom he had six children. McDonough died on April 3, 2018, at the age of 93.

Political offices
Preceded by Frank B. Morrison Jr.	Justice of the Montana Supreme Court; 1987–1993	Succeeded by James C. Nelson
