= Michael Curtis Reynolds =

American terrorist (born 1958)

- Born: April 6, 1958 (age 68); Mount Kisco, New York
- Other name: Fritz Mueller
- Occupation: Engineer
- Children: 3
- Parent(s): Millard Lee Reynolds, Joyce B Reynolds (Lawrence)
- Status: Incarcerated at FCI Schuylkill
- Convictions: 2007-07-13
- Criminal charges: See indictment
- Penalty: 30 years imprisonment

Michael Curtis Reynolds (born April 6, 1958) is an American who was convicted of terrorism-related crimes after a series of December 2005 online discussions with a US judge posing as a militant.

== Biography ==
Described as a transient, Reynolds was living with his mother at the time of his online comments.

A 1976 graduate of North Salem High School in North Salem, New York, he was also arrested on charges of disorderly conduct and breach of the peace. He was also named on legal documents related to tax liens against him, and outstanding debts he owed.

He was convicted of trying to blow up his family's Purdys, New York, home in 1978. He was given a conditional discharge after pleading guilty to a misdemeanor charge of fourth-degree attempted arson.

In 1982 he married Tammy Danise, and the couple had three children together. They later divorced, and the children went into their mother's custody. His father-in-law described him as a "John Wayne-wannabe"

== Conspiracy ==
Reynolds discussed his wishes to bomb US-based oil pipelines with online acquaintances in October 2005, including in the Yahoo! chat room entitled OBLcrew, where he posted messages stating "It is true America has overstepped its bounds in invading Iraq. Those serious enough to do something about it should e-mail... . Contact soon... . We both want something, let's talk." on October 25, and repeating his plea the following day with "Still awaiting someone serious about contact. Would be a pity to lose this idea". At some point between his online discussions in October, and his arrest in December, Reynolds moved to Pocatello, Idaho, and found work with American Microsystems.

After becoming unemployed again, Reynolds was arrested in December 2005, after arranging to meet an online acquaintance, secretly FBI informant and controversial vigilante online-terrorist-hunter Shannen Rossmiller, who had promised him $40,000 to help him purchase fuel trucks to help destroy targets. At the time, he had been living in Room 205 at the Thunderbird Motel, and his net worth was only $24.85.

Reynolds has since claimed that he was running an independent sting operation, hoping to expose terrorist cells working within the United States. He sent a letter to a local newspaper stating that version of events.

== Legal proceedings ==
Reynolds was formally charged with a firearms offence for possessing a hand grenade, though a sealed statement from the FBI also stated that he intended to blow up multiple pipelines in the United States in a bid to help further terrorist causes.

His case made further headlines when the Department of Justice subpoenaed both Reynolds and Microsoft Corporation for access to view his Hotmail eMail account, which revealed him discussing the need to leave the country after his attacks, and that he could be sentenced to death for treason.

In February 2006, unnamed judicial officials said that it was likely Reynolds was not, in fact, a terrorist, and likely suffered mental illness.

Applications for release on bail, acquittal and for the firearms charge to be dismissed, were all denied.

On October 2, 2006, Reynolds was additionally charged with "providing assistance to Al-Qaeda", in addition to "seeking to destroy property used in interstate or foreign commerce".

He waived any dispute to extradition and was extradited to Lackawanna County Prison in Scranton, Pennsylvania, where he was incarcerated pending trial, which began July 9, 2007. The judge, having been informed that Reynolds had been held without contact with his mother or any means of financial aid, suggested that the state government might afford the cost to purchase him a suit of clothing for the trial.

Reynolds had initially been assigned a public defender but had a dispute with her, and hired Joseph A. O'Brien as his attorney, before announcing he would represent himself and relegated O'Brien to the position of "advisor". Despite initial rejections from the judge who did not believe Reynolds to be mentally competent to defend himself, the petition was eventually granted

On July 13, 2007, he was convicted of plotting to blow up energy installations, attempting to enlist help on the internet, and possessing a hand grenade, and sentenced to 30 years in prison. He is now at FCI Schuylkill with BOP# 10671-023.

== Referenced targets ==
- Williams Natural Gas refinery in Opal, Wyoming
- Transcontinental natural gas pipeline that runs from the Gulf Coast to New York
- Standard Oil refinery in Perth Amboy, New Jersey
