= Mary Frances Garrigus =

American lawyer

Mary Frances Garrigus (1891–1918) was Montana's first Native American female lawyer.

She was born on August 22, 1891, in Columbus, Montana. Her Crow ancestry came from her maternal side. She graduated from Billings High School in 1912. In 1918, Garrigus became the first Native American female admitted to practice law in the state upon obtaining her Juris Doctor from the University of Montana Law School, . Garrigus died on November 30, 1918, in Billings, Montana, after having contracted the Spanish flu while working as a volunteer nurse.

== See also ==
- List of first women lawyers and judges in Montana
