= 2020 Arkansas Democratic presidential primary =

- March 3, 2020

36 delegates (31 pledged, 5 unpledged) to the Democratic National Convention The number of pledged delegates won is determined by the popular vote

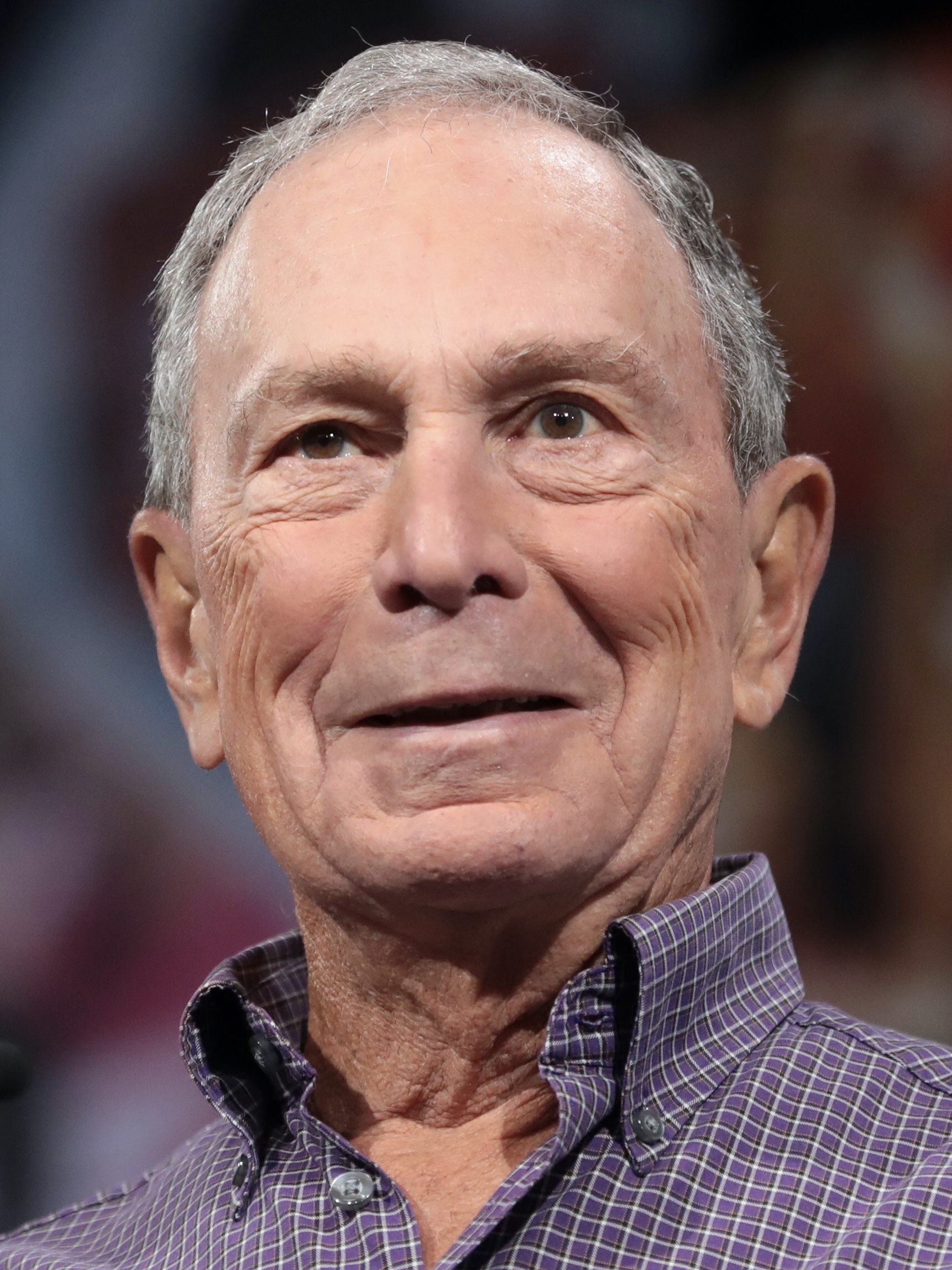

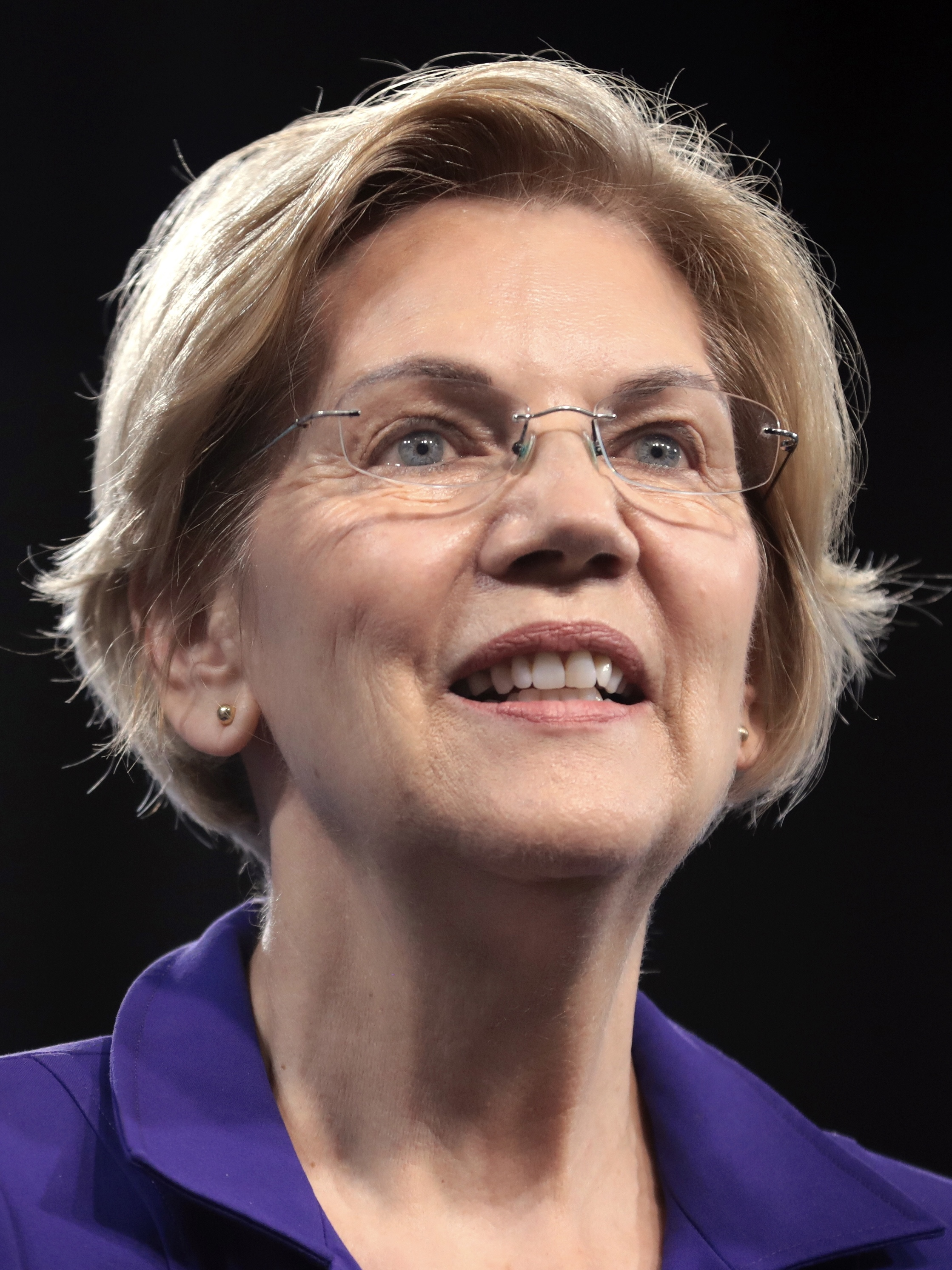
Candidate	Joe Biden	Bernie Sanders
Home state	Delaware	Vermont
Delegate count	17	9
Popular vote	93,012	51,413
Percentage	40.59%	22.44%
Candidate	Michael Bloomberg	Elizabeth Warren
Home state	New York	Massachusetts
Delegate count	5	0
Popular vote	38,312	22,971
Percentage	16.72%	10.03%
County results
Biden
30–40%
40–50%
50–60%
60–70%
Sanders
30–40%

The 2020 Arkansas Democratic presidential primary took place on March 3, 2020, as one of 15 contests scheduled on Super Tuesday in the Democratic Party primaries for the 2020 presidential election, following the South Carolina primary the weekend before. The Arkansas primary was an open primary, with the state awarding 36 delegates towards the 2020 Democratic National Convention, of which 31 were pledged delegates allocated on the basis of the results of the primary.

Former vice president Joe Biden won every county but Washington County, home to the University of Arkansas, and received 41% of the vote and 17 delegates, far ahead of senator Bernie Sanders' 22% and former mayor Michael Bloomberg's 17%, who won 9 and 5 delegates respectively. Senator Elizabeth Warren did not pass the 15% threshold.

== Procedure ==
Arkansas was one of 14 states and one territory holding primaries on March 3, 2020, also known as "Super Tuesday", having joined other states on the date after the signing of a bill calling for simultaneous state, local, and presidential primaries on the first Tuesday in March in presidential election years by governor Asa Hutchinson on March 21, 2019.

In the open primary, candidates had to meet a threshold of 15 percent at the congressional district or statewide level in order to be considered viable. The 31 pledged delegates to the 2020 Democratic National Convention were allocated proportionally on the basis of the results of the primary. Of these, between 4 and 6 were allocated to each of the state's 4 congressional districts and another 4 were allocated to party leaders and elected officials (PLEO delegates), in addition to 7 at-large delegates. The Super Tuesday primary as part of Stage I on the primary timetable received no bonus delegates, in order to disperse the primaries between more different date clusters and keep too many states from hoarding on the first shared date or on a March date in general.

The congressional district caucus and state conventions were all held virtually on May 30, 2020, as a "first-in-the-nation virtual convention" in Little Rock, to vote on all pledged degates from district-level and statewide level. The delegation also included 5 unpledged PLEO delegates: 5 members of the Democratic National Committee.

Pledged national convention delegates
Type	Del.
CD1	4
CD2	6
CD3	5
CD4	5
PLEO	4
At-large	7
Total pledged delegates	31

== Candidates ==
The following people have filed for the presidential primary.

Running

- Joe Biden
- Michael Bloomberg
- Mosie Boyd
- Tulsi Gabbard
- Bernie Sanders
- Elizabeth Warren

Withdrawn

- Michael Bennet
- Cory Booker
- Steve Bullock
- Pete Buttigieg (Note: Candidate withdrew after early voting had started.)
- Julian Castro
- John Delaney
- Kamala Harris
- Amy Klobuchar
- Joe Sestak
- Tom Steyer
- Marianne Williamson
- Andrew Yang

== Polling ==
Polling Aggregation
Source of poll aggregation	Date updated	Dates polled	Joe Biden	Michael Bloomberg	Bernie Sanders	Elizabeth Warren	Tulsi Gabbard	Other/ Undecided (Note: Calculated by taking the difference of 100% and all other candidates combined)
270 to Win	March 3, 2020	February 6–March 2, 2020	27.7%	22.3%	18.7%	11.3%	0.5%	19.5%
RealClear Politics	March 3, 2020	Insufficient recent polling to supply an average.						
FiveThirtyEight	March 3, 2020	until March 2, 2020 (Note: FiveThirtyEight aggregates polls with a trendline regression of polls rather than a strict average of recent polls.)	27.5%	21.0%	18.1%	12.5%	0.3%	20.6%
Average			27.6%	21.65%	18.4%	11.9%	0.4%	20.05%
Arkansas primary results (March 3, 2020)			40.5%	16.7%	22.4%	10.0%	0.7%	9.7%

Tabulation of individual polls of the 2020 Arkansas Democratic Primary
Poll source	Date(s) administered	Sample size (Note: Key: A – all adults RV – registered voters LV – likely voters V – unclear)	Margin of error	Joe Biden	Michael Bloomberg	Pete Buttigieg	Bernie Sanders	Elizabeth Warren	Other	Undecided
	Mar 1–2, 2020	Buttigieg and Klobuchar withdraw from the race								
Swayable	Mar 1–2, 2020	714 (LV)	± 6.0%	28%	25%	8%	17%	10%	13% (Note: Klobuchar with 7%; Steyer with 1%; Gabbard with 0%; "Other" with 5%)	–
Data for Progress	Feb 28–Mar 2, 2020	300 (LV)	± 5.6%	36%	22%	2%	23%	15%	2% (Note: Klobuchar and Gabbard with 1%)	–
The Progress Campaign (D)	Feb 21–25, 2020	209 (RV)	± 4.9%	17%	17%	18%	19%	12%	6% (Note: Klobuchar with 6%)	10% (Note: Listed as "undecided/would not vote")
Hendrix College/Talk Business & Politics	February 6–7, 2020	496 (LV)	± 4.3%	18.5%	19.6%	15.5%	16.4%	8.9%	10.1% (Note: Klobuchar with 4.8%; Yang with 2%; "someone else" with 3.3%)	11%

== Results ==
Popular vote share by county Biden—30–40% Biden—40–50% Biden—50–60% Biden—60–70% Sanders—30–40%

2020 Arkansas Democratic presidential primary
Candidate	Votes	%	Delegates
Joe Biden	93,012	40.59	17
Bernie Sanders	51,413	22.44	9
Michael Bloomberg	38,312	16.72	5
Elizabeth Warren	22,971	10.03	
Pete Buttigieg (withdrawn)	7,649	3.34	
Amy Klobuchar (withdrawn)	7,009	3.06	
Tom Steyer (withdrawn)	2,053	0.90	
Tulsi Gabbard	1,593	0.70	
Kamala Harris (withdrawn)	715	0.31	
Andrew Yang (withdrawn)	715	0.31	
Michael Bennet (withdrawn)	574	0.25	
Cory Booker (withdrawn)	572	0.25	
Marianne Williamson (withdrawn)	501	0.22	
Steve Bullock (withdrawn)	485	0.21	
John Delaney (withdrawn)	443	0.19	
Joe Sestak (withdrawn)	408	0.18	
Julian Castro (withdrawn)	304	0.13	
Other candidate	393	0.17	
Total	229,122	100%	31

=== Results by county ===
2020 Arkansas Democratic primary (results per county)
County	Joe Biden		Bernie Sanders		Michael Bloomberg		Elizabeth Warren		Pete Buttigieg		Amy Klobuchar		Tom Steyer		Tulsi Gabbard		Kamala Harris		Andrew Yang		Michael Bennet		Cory Booker		Marianne Williamson		Steve Bullock		John Delaney		Joe Sestak		Mosie Boyd		Julian Castro		Total votes cast
County	Votes	%	Votes	%	Votes	%	Votes	%	Votes	%	Votes	%	Votes	%	Votes	%	Votes	%	Votes	%	Votes	%	Votes	%	Votes	%	Votes	%	Votes	%	Votes	%	Votes	%	Votes	%	Total votes cast
Arkansas	450	49.23	125	13.68	158	17.29	81	8.86	21	2.30	35	3.83	16	1.75	10	1.09	1	0.11	0	0.00	1	0.11	0	0.00	1	0.11	3	0.33	4	0.44	0	0.00	6	0.66	2	0.22	914
Ashley	633	52.40	253	20.94	133	11.01	62	5.13	29	2.40	29	2.40	7	0.58	7	0.58	5	0.41	3	0.25	7	0.58	5	0.41	10	0.83	12	0.99	3	0.25	0	0.00	6	0.50	4	0.33	1,208
Baxter	955	43.02	448	20.18	400	18.02	188	8.47	100	4.50	79	3.56	11	0.50	7	0.32	8	0.36	7	0.32	0	0.00	0	0.00	5	0.23	4	0.18	3	0.14	3	0.14	1	0.05	1	0.05	2,220
Benton	5,745	31.65	5,270	29.03	2,819	15.53	2,438	13.43	1,001	5.51	498	2.74	118	0.65	95	0.52	9	0.05	60	0.33	10	0.06	13	0.07	18	0.10	16	0.09	9	0.05	11	0.06	5	0.03	17	0.09	18,152
Boone	676	40.36	406	24.24	265	15.82	152	9.07	65	3.88	55	3.28	8	0.48	22	1.31	2	0.12	6	0.36	2	0.12	1	0.06	3	0.18	5	0.30	3	0.18	2	0.12	1	0.06	1	0.06	1,675
Bradley	372	54.95	96	14.18	106	15.66	24	3.55	15	2.22	8	1.18	16	2.36	5	0.74	14	2.07	1	0.15	4	0.59	9	1.33	2	0.30	0	0.00	2	0.30	1	0.15	1	0.15	1	0.15	677
Calhoun	141	43.93	53	16.51	66	20.56	13	4.05	13	4.05	8	2.49	2	0.62	1	0.31	1	0.31	2	0.62	5	1.56	4	1.25	1	0.31	3	0.93	2	0.62	3	0.93	2	0.62	1	0.31	321
Carroll	742	31.60	728	31.01	293	12.48	308	13.12	120	5.11	91	3.88	12	0.51	28	1.19	4	0.17	8	0.34	2	0.09	1	0.04	4	0.17	3	0.13	1	0.04	0	0.00	1	0.04	2	0.09	2,348
Chicot	711	54.27	197	15.04	266	20.31	45	3.44	14	1.07	18	1.37	10	0.76	4	0.31	8	0.61	4	0.31	7	0.53	1	0.08	1	0.08	7	0.53	6	0.46	3	0.23	5	0.38	3	0.23	1,310
Clark	948	48.79	331	17.04	282	14.51	150	7.72	57	2.93	68	3.50	28	1.44	11	0.57	23	1.18	8	0.41	0	0.00	2	0.10	5	0.26	3	0.15	7	0.36	8	0.41	10	0.51	2	0.10	1,943
Clay	262	39.70	115	17.42	179	27.12	35	5.30	14	2.12	14	2.12	10	1.52	5	0.76	6	0.91	0	0.00	2	0.30	2	0.30	6	0.91	2	0.30	4	0.61	2	0.30	2	0.30	0	0.00	660
Cleburne	556	45.61	178	14.60	278	22.81	85	6.97	40	3.28	44	3.61	14	1.15	8	0.66	2	0.16	2	0.16	2	0.16	1	0.08	1	0.08	4	0.33	0	0.00	1	0.08	1	0.08	2	0.16	1,219
Cleveland	186	47.21	66	16.75	70	17.77	17	4.31	9	2.28	17	4.31	5	1.27	5	1.27	1	0.25	3	0.76	0	0.00	0	0.00	5	1.27	3	0.76	1	0.25	3	0.76	2	0.51	1	0.25	394
Columbia	613	52.66	175	15.03	187	16.07	51	4.38	16	1.37	25	2.15	26	2.23	13	1.12	8	0.69	4	0.34	6	0.52	6	0.52	8	0.69	7	0.60	10	0.86	6	0.52	0	0.00	3	0.26	1,164
Conway	974	45.73	359	16.85	370	17.37	125	5.87	68	3.19	62	2.91	52	2.44	27	1.27	26	1.22	6	0.28	3	0.14	6	0.28	3	0.14	6	0.28	10	0.47	10	0.47	22	1.03	1	0.05	2,130
Craighead	1,849	36.14	1,397	27.31	873	17.06	487	9.52	198	3.87	166	3.24	31	0.61	26	0.51	13	0.25	22	0.43	3	0.06	8	0.16	6	0.12	21	0.41	3	0.06	2	0.04	2	0.04	9	0.18	5,116
Crawford	1,061	37.91	623	22.26	569	20.33	221	7.90	71	2.54	80	2.86	56	2.00	30	1.07	9	0.32	14	0.50	7	0.25	7	0.25	11	0.39	4	0.14	2	0.07	6	0.21	23	0.82	5	0.18	2,799
Crittenden	1,652	53.20	491	15.81	568	18.29	144	4.64	43	1.38	68	2.19	20	0.64	21	0.68	11	0.35	20	0.64	10	0.32	9	0.29	12	0.39	7	0.23	7	0.23	11	0.35	5	0.16	6	0.19	3,105
Cross	430	48.37	149	16.76	161	18.11	44	4.95	36	4.05	22	2.47	8	0.90	4	0.45	8	0.90	3	0.34	4	0.45	5	0.56	2	0.22	3	0.34	4	0.45	3	0.34	2	0.22	1	0.11	889
Dallas	350	53.68	58	8.90	108	16.56	18	2.76	7	1.07	28	4.29	17	2.61	12	1.84	5	0.77	4	0.61	1	0.15	12	1.84	2	0.31	10	1.53	3	0.46	3	0.46	10	1.53	4	0.61	652
Desha	641	52.16	173	14.08	227	18.47	46	3.74	16	1.30	29	2.36	23	1.87	6	0.49	12	0.98	6	0.49	13	1.06	13	1.06	6	0.49	7	0.57	2	0.16	3	0.24	5	0.41	1	0.08	1,229
Drew	655	46.49	225	15.97	264	18.74	81	5.75	23	1.63	71	5.04	14	0.99	10	0.71	5	0.35	5	0.35	6	0.43	7	0.50	7	0.50	17	1.21	4	0.28	11	0.78	3	0.21	1	0.07	1,409
Faulkner	3,059	34.27	2,503	28.04	1,223	13.70	1,295	14.51	294	3.29	317	3.55	57	0.64	54	0.60	21	0.24	24	0.27	13	0.15	8	0.09	12	0.13	19	0.21	5	0.06	6	0.07	11	0.12	6	0.07	8,927
Franklin	355	36.08	147	14.94	247	25.10	72	7.32	32	3.25	42	4.27	19	1.93	13	1.32	11	1.12	3	0.30	5	0.51	11	1.12	6	0.61	2	0.20	7	0.71	4	0.41	4	0.41	4	0.41	984
Fulton	331	40.66	154	18.92	160	19.66	56	6.88	25	3.07	28	3.44	12	1.47	6	0.74	1	0.12	8	0.98	12	1.47	3	0.37	0	0.00	3	0.37	9	1.11	3	0.37	1	0.12	2	0.25	814
Garland	2,890	36.85	1,653	21.08	1,550	19.76	677	8.63	391	4.99	389	4.96	87	1.11	48	0.61	19	0.24	30	0.38	6	0.08	20	0.26	34	0.43	7	0.09	19	0.24	10	0.13	7	0.09	6	0.08	7,843
Grant	355	36.52	172	17.70	191	19.65	85	8.74	54	5.56	55	5.66	16	1.65	10	1.03	3	0.31	4	0.41	6	0.62	3	0.31	4	0.41	6	0.62	2	0.21	2	0.21	3	0.31	1	0.10	972
Greene	646	34.96	399	21.59	426	23.05	133	7.20	82	4.44	56	3.03	24	1.30	15	0.81	3	0.16	15	0.81	7	0.38	11	0.60	5	0.27	12	0.65	10	0.54	4	0.22	0	0.00	0	0.00	1,848
Hempstead	549	55.57	128	12.96	149	15.08	43	4.35	15	1.52	28	2.83	10	1.01	8	0.81	9	0.91	1	0.10	4	0.40	2	0.20	9	0.91	15	1.52	10	1.01	2	0.20	2	0.20	4	0.40	988
Hot Spring	735	38.99	452	23.98	344	18.25	111	5.89	43	2.28	85	4.51	26	1.38	11	0.58	5	0.27	11	0.58	12	0.64	9	0.48	9	0.48	3	0.16	14	0.74	3	0.16	5	0.27	7	0.37	1,885
Howard	358	52.49	104	15.25	81	11.88	38	5.57	19	2.79	29	4.25	12	1.76	6	0.88	7	1.03	3	0.44	5	0.73	3	0.44	3	0.44	5	0.73	0	0.00	2	0.29	4	0.59	3	0.44	682
Independence	796	41.22	354	18.33	338	17.50	200	10.36	61	3.16	79	4.09	24	1.24	28	1.45	7	0.36	7	0.36	4	0.21	8	0.41	9	0.47	5	0.26	2	0.10	2	0.10	5	0.26	2	0.10	1,931
Izard	356	45.01	144	18.20	120	15.17	64	8.09	34	4.30	41	5.18	2	0.25	6	0.76	3	0.38	6	0.76	1	0.13	2	0.25	2	0.25	2	0.25	1	0.13	1	0.13	5	0.63	1	0.13	791
Jackson	466	46.32	163	16.20	193	19.18	57	5.67	35	3.48	31	3.08	7	0.70	12	1.19	5	0.50	2	0.20	9	0.89	2	0.20	1	0.10	5	0.50	11	1.09	4	0.40	2	0.20	1	0.10	1,006
Jefferson	5,018	48.40	1,496	14.43	2,238	21.59	649	6.26	114	1.10	197	1.90	189	1.82	85	0.82	31	0.30	40	0.39	23	0.22	62	0.60	43	0.41	27	0.26	25	0.24	64	0.62	14	0.14	53	0.51	10,368
Johnson	573	33.43	356	20.77	303	17.68	161	9.39	85	4.96	86	5.02	47	2.74	31	1.81	4	0.23	14	0.82	9	0.53	9	0.53	7	0.41	7	0.41	6	0.35	6	0.35	3	0.18	7	0.41	1,714
Lafayette	237	68.30	37	10.66	40	11.53	8	2.31	5	1.44	4	1.15	3	0.86	0	0.00	4	1.15	0	0.00	0	0.00	0	0.00	4	1.15	4	1.15	0	0.00	1	0.29	0	0.00	0	0.00	347
Lawrence	391	36.37	187	17.40	211	19.63	78	7.26	37	3.44	47	4.37	32	2.98	39	3.63	8	0.74	8	0.74	4	0.37	1	0.09	3	0.28	3	0.28	13	1.21	7	0.65	3	0.28	3	0.28	1,075
Lee	420	53.98	112	14.40	142	18.25	12	1.54	5	0.64	26	3.34	10	1.29	9	1.16	2	0.26	4	0.51	21	2.70	1	0.13	4	0.51	2	0.26	2	0.26	3	0.39	2	0.26	1	0.13	778
Lincoln	371	52.33	119	16.78	107	15.09	20	2.82	7	0.99	26	3.67	13	1.83	12	1.69	4	0.56	5	0.71	1	0.14	2	0.28	3	0.42	4	0.56	2	0.28	9	1.27	2	0.28	2	0.28	709
Little River	379	54.53	97	13.96	94	13.53	36	5.18	17	2.45	12	1.73	5	0.72	7	1.01	9	1.29	3	0.43	6	0.86	5	0.72	7	1.01	6	0.86	1	0.14	3	0.43	2	0.29	6	0.86	695
Logan	415	40.33	163	15.84	261	25.36	76	7.39	27	2.62	19	1.85	21	2.04	10	0.97	4	0.39	7	0.68	7	0.68	4	0.39	1	0.10	1	0.10	2	0.19	4	0.39	4	0.39	3	0.29	1,029
Lonoke	1,252	37.97	795	24.11	560	16.99	298	9.04	131	3.97	135	4.09	28	0.85	27	0.82	11	0.33	15	0.45	9	0.27	3	0.09	3	0.09	9	0.27	4	0.12	10	0.30	3	0.09	4	0.12	3,297
Madison	391	35.48	269	24.41	202	18.33	92	8.35	52	4.72	26	2.36	17	1.54	15	1.36	6	0.54	2	0.18	1	0.09	4	0.36	6	0.54	5	0.45	6	0.54	2	0.18	4	0.36	2	0.18	1,102
Marion	327	38.02	210	24.42	148	17.21	72	8.37	47	5.47	28	3.26	7	0.81	4	0.47	4	0.47	2	0.23	1	0.12	0	0.00	6	0.70	2	0.23	0	0.00	0	0.00	0	0.00	2	0.23	860
Miller	1,069	61.09	270	15.43	215	12.29	78	4.46	23	1.31	22	1.26	9	0.51	10	0.57	11	0.63	2	0.11	5	0.29	7	0.40	9	0.51	5	0.29	7	0.40	2	0.11	4	0.23	2	0.11	1,750
Mississippi	1,017	51.05	322	16.16	381	19.13	101	5.07	34	1.71	29	1.46	9	0.45	9	0.45	5	0.25	11	0.55	13	0.65	13	0.65	5	0.25	16	0.80	10	0.50	10	0.50	4	0.20	3	0.15	1,992
Monroe	375	48.70	132	17.14	109	14.16	39	5.06	11	1.43	12	1.56	12	1.56	16	2.08	4	0.52	4	0.52	26	3.38	10	1.30	4	0.52	5	0.65	3	0.39	5	0.65	2	0.26	1	0.13	770
Montgomery	226	45.02	85	16.93	85	16.93	36	7.17	15	2.99	27	5.38	7	1.39	3	0.60	1	0.20	1	0.20	6	1.20	1	0.20	2	0.40	2	0.40	0	0.00	2	0.40	2	0.40	1	0.20	502
Nevada	299	51.37	90	15.46	77	13.23	34	5.84	6	1.03	26	4.47	11	1.89	7	1.20	3	0.52	1	0.17	1	0.17	4	0.69	7	1.20	4	0.69	4	0.69	4	0.69	1	0.17	3	0.52	582
Newton	184	39.66	137	29.53	61	13.15	53	11.42	5	1.08	11	2.37	1	0.22	7	1.51	0	0.00	3	0.65	0	0.00	0	0.00	0	0.00	0	0.00	1	0.22	0	0.00	0	0.00	1	0.22	464
Ouachita	1,218	57.29	295	13.88	348	16.37	67	3.15	49	2.30	39	1.83	13	0.61	19	0.89	11	0.52	8	0.38	14	0.66	3	0.14	12	0.56	13	0.61	3	0.14	4	0.19	8	0.38	2	0.09	2,126
Perry	269	33.17	164	20.22	181	22.32	71	8.75	29	3.58	43	5.30	14	1.73	4	0.49	6	0.74	6	0.74	3	0.37	5	0.62	5	0.62	4	0.49	3	0.37	2	0.25	2	0.25	0	0.00	811
Phillips	969	52.52	291	15.77	296	16.04	94	5.09	19	1.03	53	2.87	8	0.43	21	1.14	10	0.54	9	0.49	7	0.38	14	0.76	6	0.33	7	0.38	18	0.98	15	0.81	2	0.11	6	0.33	1,845
Pike	190	41.67	73	16.01	68	14.91	42	9.21	16	3.51	33	7.24	8	1.75	8	1.75	2	0.44	3	0.66	4	0.88	5	1.10	1	0.22	1	0.22	0	0.00	1	0.22	0	0.00	1	0.22	456
Poinsett	393	46.56	168	19.91	157	18.60	49	5.81	10	1.18	13	1.54	12	1.42	9	1.07	2	0.24	3	0.36	2	0.24	4	0.47	3	0.36	7	0.83	4	0.47	2	0.24	4	0.47	2	0.24	844
Polk	272	31.74	208	24.27	157	18.32	74	8.63	40	4.67	40	4.67	16	1.87	13	1.52	1	0.12	9	1.05	6	0.70	1	0.12	4	0.47	1	0.12	4	0.47	7	0.82	2	0.23	2	0.23	857
Pope	1,070	34.35	861	27.64	491	15.76	323	10.37	134	4.30	113	3.63	28	0.90	19	0.61	7	0.22	11	0.35	6	0.19	3	0.10	15	0.48	8	0.26	11	0.35	10	0.32	3	0.10	2	0.06	3,115
Prairie	207	47.70	76	17.51	69	15.90	23	5.30	5	1.15	20	4.61	6	1.38	7	1.61	4	0.92	0	0.00	4	0.92	2	0.46	0	0.00	3	0.69	0	0.00	4	0.92	1	0.23	3	0.69	434
Pulaski	24,587	44.66	11,063	20.10	8,991	16.33	6,261	11.37	1,604	2.91	1,503	2.73	236	0.43	227	0.41	114	0.21	86	0.16	123	0.22	93	0.17	25	0.05	27	0.05	27	0.05	39	0.07	28	0.05	18	0.03	55,052
Randolph	333	32.84	225	22.19	246	24.26	72	7.10	35	3.45	40	3.94	9	0.89	11	1.08	13	1.28	4	0.39	2	0.20	9	0.89	3	0.30	1	0.10	6	0.59	1	0.10	1	0.10	3	0.30	1,014
Saline	3,121	37.30	1,814	21.68	1,532	18.31	834	9.97	399	4.77	385	4.60	96	1.15	39	0.47	45	0.54	22	0.26	9	0.11	14	0.17	17	0.20	2	0.02	8	0.10	10	0.12	7	0.08	13	0.16	8,367
Scott	159	44.41	55	15.36	73	20.39	16	4.47	11	3.07	13	3.63	4	1.12	6	1.68	0	0.00	0	0.00	6	1.68	5	1.40	0	0.00	4	1.12	1	0.28	1	0.28	3	0.84	1	0.28	358
Searcy	121	36.56	82	24.77	52	15.71	45	13.60	12	3.63	8	2.42	1	0.30	1	0.30	0	0.00	1	0.30	2	0.60	1	0.30	1	0.30	1	0.30	0	0.00	1	0.30	1	0.30	1	0.30	331
Sebastian	2,735	35.85	1,919	25.15	1,486	19.48	671	8.80	328	4.30	194	2.54	91	1.19	56	0.73	10	0.13	22	0.29	8	0.10	9	0.12	4	0.05	14	0.18	10	0.13	3	0.04	63	0.83	6	0.08	7,629
Sevier	255	47.22	105	19.44	94	17.41	32	5.93	11	2.04	9	1.67	6	1.11	5	0.93	3	0.56	5	0.93	2	0.37	0	0.00	6	1.11	1	0.19	1	0.19	0	0.00	0	0.00	5	0.93	540
Sharp	417	41.49	195	19.40	188	18.71	64	6.37	42	4.18	34	3.38	11	1.09	21	2.09	7	0.70	1	0.10	7	0.70	2	0.20	2	0.20	1	0.10	6	0.60	4	0.40	1	0.10	2	0.20	1,005
St. Francis	1,182	55.03	297	13.83	368	17.13	84	3.91	27	1.26	34	1.58	10	0.47	15	0.70	20	0.93	10	0.47	14	0.65	11	0.51	16	0.74	20	0.93	19	0.88	5	0.23	13	0.61	3	0.14	2,148
Stone	343	33.83	246	24.26	158	15.58	112	11.05	48	4.73	41	4.04	13	1.28	15	1.48	2	0.20	3	0.30	1	0.10	5	0.49	3	0.30	2	0.20	17	1.68	0	0.00	4	0.39	1	0.10	1,014
Union	1,350	54.09	450	18.03	356	14.26	113	4.53	51	2.04	38	1.52	14	0.56	15	0.60	29	1.16	2	0.08	8	0.32	25	1.00	16	0.64	4	0.16	7	0.28	9	0.36	4	0.16	5	0.20	2,496
Van Buren	418	37.79	198	17.90	217	19.62	121	10.94	43	3.89	55	4.97	21	1.90	12	1.08	1	0.09	1	0.09	3	0.27	2	0.18	3	0.27	5	0.45	1	0.09	3	0.27	1	0.09	1	0.09	1,106
Washington	6,914	28.33	8,491	34.79	3,007	12.32	3,884	15.91	920	3.77	687	2.81	149	0.61	157	0.64	22	0.09	58	0.24	14	0.06	22	0.09	17	0.07	14	0.06	14	0.06	8	0.03	9	0.04	19	0.08	24,406
White	1,401	42.53	685	20.80	599	18.18	284	8.62	86	2.61	111	3.37	26	0.79	29	0.88	14	0.43	17	0.52	9	0.27	4	0.12	4	0.12	6	0.18	4	0.12	4	0.12	8	0.24	3	0.09	3,294
Woodruff	303	43.66	120	17.29	119	17.15	57	8.21	12	1.73	15	2.16	15	2.16	8	1.15	3	0.43	6	0.86	5	0.72	3	0.43	4	0.58	3	0.43	8	1.15	6	0.86	6	0.86	1	0.14	694
Yell	342	36.42	166	17.68	161	17.15	88	9.37	36	3.83	60	6.39	25	2.66	11	1.17	3	0.32	4	0.43	3	0.32	10	1.06	7	0.75	3	0.32	5	0.53	2	0.21	8	0.85	5	0.53	939
Total	93,011	40.59	51,413	22.44	38,312	16.72	22,970	10.03	7,649	3.34	7,009	3.06	2,053	0.90	1,593	0.70	715	0.31	715	0.31	574	0.25	572	0.25	501	0.22	485	0.21	443	0.19	408	0.18	393	0.17	304	0.13	229,120

== See also ==
- 2020 Arkansas Republican presidential primary
