= Katherine M. Bidegaray =

American judge (born 1960)

Katherine Bidegaray

Associate Justice of the Montana Supreme Court
- Incumbent
- Assumed office January 2, 2025
- Preceded by: Dirk Sandefur

Personal details
- Born: April 27, 1960 (age 65); Sidney, Montana, U.S.
- Education: University of Montana (BA, JD)

Katherine M. Bidegaray (born April 27, 1960) is an American lawyer who has served as an associate justice of the Montana Supreme Court since 2025. She served as a judge of Montana's 7th judicial district court from 2003 to 2025.

== Education ==
Bidegaray is the child of Basque immigrants. She was born and raised in Sidney, Montana. She graduated valedictorian from Culbertson High in 1978. She later received a Bachelor of Arts from the University of Montana in 1982 and a Juris Doctor from the Alexander Blewett III School of Law of the University of Montana in 1985.

== Career ==
After graduating law school, Bidegaray began her career as an insurance department staff attorney and then as deputy securities commissioner at the Montana State Auditor's office. During her career she also served as a hearing examiner at the Montana Office of Public Instruction. She later established her private practice in Sidney, Montana. She was elected to the seventh district court in 2002, taking office in 2003. She was retained by voters in 2008 and 2014.

=== Montana Supreme Court ===
Bidegaray was one of six candidates to file for election to a seat on the Montana Supreme Court. She would go on to finish first in the primary election, facing fellow District Judge Dan Wilson for election to the seat held by Justice Dirk Sandefur. Bidegaray won the general election held on November 5, 2024, defeating challenger Wilson. She was sworn into office on January 2, 2025.

== Electoral history ==
2024 Montana Supreme Court Justice #3 election
Party	Candidate	Votes	%
Nonpartisan	Katherine Bidegaray	299,480	54.08%
Nonpartisan	Dan Wilson	254,294	45.92%
Total votes		553,774	100.0%

Legal offices
Preceded by Dirk Sandefur	Associate Justice of the Montana Supreme Court; 2025–present	Incumbent
