= Karla M. Gray =

American judge

Chief Justice of the Montana Supreme Court
- In office 2001–2008
- Preceded by: Jean A. Turnage
- Succeeded by: Mike McGrath

Associate Justice of the Montana Supreme Court
- In office 1991–2000
- Appointed by: Stan Stephens
- Preceded by: Diane Barz
- Succeeded by: James A. Rice

Personal details
- Born: Karla Marie Gray; May 10, 1947 Escanaba, Michigan, U.S.
- Died: February 19, 2017 (aged 69) Helena, Montana, U.S.
- Spouse: Myron Currie (m. 1979)
- Education: Western Michigan University (B.A., M.A.); Hastings College (J.D.)

Karla Marie Gray (May 10, 1947 – February 19, 2017) was an American attorney and judge who served as the chief justice of the Montana Supreme Court; she was the first woman to serve as Chief Justice and to be elected to the Montana Supreme Court.

== Background ==
Gray was born in Escanaba, Michigan. She attended Western Michigan University in Kalamazoo from 1965 to 1970, earning a B.A. and an M.A. in African history. She then moved to California, working as a clerk matron at the Mountain View Police Department.

She received a J.D. in 1976 from Hastings College of the Law in San Francisco, where she was an editor of the Hastings Law Journal. After law school, she moved to Butte, Montana, where she served as a law clerk for Senior United States District Court Judge William Daniel Murray.

== Law career ==
After her clerkship ended in 1977, Gray practiced law as in-house corporate counsel for Atlantic Richfield and the Montana Power Company as well as in a solo practice. During the 1980s, she was a lobbyist at the Montana Legislature, representing the Montana Trial Lawyers Association, Montana Power Company and related interests.

Governor Stan Stephens appointed Gray as an associate justice of the Montana Supreme Court in 1991, following the resignation of Diane Barz. Barz had been the first woman to serve on the court; Gray then became the second. Gray won election as an associate justice in 1992 and again in 1998. She subsequently became the first woman to be elected Chief Justice in 2000, defeating fellow sitting Justice Terry N. Trieweiler by 8,800 votes out of approximately 387,000 cast. Justice Gray retired from the bench in 2008.

Gray helped found the national Self Represented Litigants Network as well as co-authoring the nationwide judges’ manual on Self-Represented Litigants.

== Honors ==
In 1992 Gray was named one of three distinguished alumni from Western Michigan University.

The State Bar of Montana established the annual Karla M. Gray Award. It is given by the Supreme Court's Access to Justice Commission to a judge who has advanced access to Montana's courts.

== Personal life ==
Gray and Myron Currie married in Butte in 1979 and remained married until her death in Helena, Montana, on February 19, 2017. The cause of death was cancer. She was 69.

Legal offices
Preceded by Diane Barz	Montana Supreme Court; 1991-2000	Succeeded by James A. Rice
Preceded by Jean Turnage	Chief Justice of the Montana Supreme Court; 2000–2008	Succeeded by Mike McGrath

== See also ==
- List of female state supreme court justices
