= Cory Swanson =

American lawyer (born 1976 or 1977)

Chief Justice of the Montana Supreme Court
- Incumbent
- Assumed office January 6, 2025
- Preceded by: Mike McGrath

Personal details
- Born: Cory James Swanson; 1976 or 1977 (age 48–49)
- Party: Republican
- Education: Carroll College (BA); University of Montana (JD)

Military service
- Allegiance: United States
- Branch/service: Army National Guard; Montana Army National Guard
- Years of service: 1997–present
- Rank: Colonel
- Unit: 1-163rd Mechanized Infantry / Combined Arms Battalion
- Battles/wars: Operation Spartan Shield
- Awards: Bronze Star; Meritorious Service Medal; Army Commendation Medal

Cory James Swanson (born 1976 or 1977) is an American lawyer who has served as the chief justice of the Montana Supreme Court since January 2025. He was previously the Broadwater County attorney from 2014 to 2025.

== Education ==
Swanson received a Bachelor of Arts from Carroll College in 2000 and a Juris Doctor from the Alexander Blewett III School of Law of the University of Montana in 2004.

== Career ==
Swanson joined the Montana Army National Guard in June 1997 and was commissioned as a second lieutenant in August 1998. He had multiple deployments to the Middle East and will retire with the rank of colonel.

From 2013 to 2014, he served as deputy attorney general under then-Montana Attorney General Tim Fox. He was elected as Broadwater County attorney in 2014 and subsequently re-elected in 2018 and 2022.

=== Montana Supreme Court ===
In December 2023, Swanson announced his candidacy to run for position of chief justice of the Montana Supreme Court. His candidacy was supported by local sheriffs and the Montana Chamber of Commerce. Swanson won the general election held on November 5, 2024, defeating former Federal Magistrate Judge Jeremiah Lynch. He was sworn into office on January 6, 2025.

== Personal life ==
Swanson has been married Julie since July 2007. He and Julie reside in Townsend with their son and daughter.

== Electoral history ==
SUPREME COURT CHIEF JUSTICE
Party	Candidate	Votes	%
Nonpartisan	Cory Swanson	296,545	54%
Nonpartisan	Jeremiah Lynch	254,595	46%
Total votes		551,140	100.00

Legal offices
Preceded by Mike McGrath	Chief Justice of the Montana Supreme Court; 2025–present	Incumbent
