= Clerk of the Montana Supreme Court =

The Clerk of the Montana Supreme Court is a statewide elected office of the U.S. state of Montana. The clerk is elected every six years, and is responsible for receiving and validating appellate paperwork for the Montana Supreme Court, as well as being the custodian of records for Montana Supreme Court cases. The current clerk is Bowen Greenwood.

== List ==
#	Name	Term of office	Party	Notes
1	A. W. Tarbet	1865–1866		(Note: Alternatively referred to as A. W. Torbet in some sources.)
2	J. Allen Hosmer	1866–1867		
3	Lucius S. Peck	1867–1870		
4	Isaac R. Alden	1870–1887		
5	Robert L. Word	1887–1889		
6	William J. Kennedy	1889–1892	Republican	
7	Benjamin Webster	1893–1899	Republican	
8	Henry C. Rickerts	1899–1905	Democratic	
9	John T. Athey	1905–1915	Republican	
10	John T. Carroll	1915–1922	Democratic	
11	Dana M. Easton	1923–1924	Republican	
12	J. Ward Crosby	1924–1935	Republican	
13	Arthur T. Porter	1935–1942	Democratic	
14	Peter T. Rigg	1942–1942	Republican	
15	Frank Murray	1942–1957	Democratic	
16	Edna Hinman	1957–1959	Republican	
17	Thomas J. Kearney	1959–1983	Democratic	
18	Ethel Harrison	1983–1989	Republican	
19	Ed Smith	1989–2019	Democratic	
20	Bowen Greenwood	2019—	Republican	
