= Mike McGrath (judge) =

American judge (born 1947)

Chief Justice of the Montana Supreme Court
- In office January 5, 2009 – January 6, 2025
- Preceded by: Karla M. Gray
- Succeeded by: Cory Swanson

22nd Attorney General of Montana
- In office January 5, 2001 – January 5, 2009
- Governor: Judy Martz; Brian Schweitzer
- Preceded by: Joseph Mazurek
- Succeeded by: Steve Bullock

Personal details
- Born: August 22, 1947 (age 79) Butte, Montana, U.S.
- Party: Democratic
- Education: University of Montana, Missoula (BA); Gonzaga University (JD)

Military service
- Allegiance: United States
- Branch/service: United States Air Force
- Years of service: 1970–1972

Michael McGrath (born August 22, 1947) is an American lawyer and judge who served as the chief justice of the Montana Supreme Court from 2009 to 2025. He also served as the attorney general of Montana from 2000 to 2008. He is a veteran of the United States Air Force.

== Early life and education ==
A native of Butte, Montana, McGrath graduated from the University of Montana with a Bachelor of Arts in business administration in 1970. Then he served in the United States Air Force from 1970 to 1972. He went on to earn his Juris Doctor from Gonzaga University School of Law in 1975. He is the recipient of the 2021 Gonzaga Law Medal.

== Legal career ==
McGrath worked in Reno, Nevada as a Reginald Heber Smith Community Lawyer Fellow from 1975 to 1976. He became Montana's Assistant Attorney General in 1977 and served until 1982.

He served as County Attorney for Lewis and Clark County for five terms spanning 1982 to 2000. In his eighteen years as a prosecutor, McGrath focused on family violence issues, including domestic abuse and sexual assault of children. He ran an unsuccessful campaign against Marc Racicot for Attorney General in 1988.

McGrath defeated Jim Rice for Montana Attorney General in 2000. He won a second term in 2004. As Attorney General, he focused on methamphetamine prevention and natural resource and land issues. In 2005, Montana was ranked as fifth worst for meth abuse among US states.

McGrath campaigned against Ron Waterman for Chief Justice of the Montana Supreme Court in 2008. He took office in January 2009 on the seat vacated by Karla Gray. He ran unopposed in 2016 for another eight-year term. McGrath stated he would not run for re-election in 2024.

Besides his legal career, McGrath ran for Governor of Montana in 1992. He lost in the Democratic primary to former State Representative Dorothy Bradley.

He is a former chair of the Conference of Western Attorneys General and served as president of the Montana County Attorneys' Association.

== Notable case ==
On December 18, 2024, McGrath authored the 6-1 ruling holding that struck down a Montana law limiting analyses of greenhouse gas emission measurements. The Montana law, which was challenged by a group of youth plaintiffs, was struck down under a provision in the Montana Constitution that guarantees the right to a clean and healthy environment.

== Personal life ==
He and his wife Joy have two sons and five grandchildren.

Legal offices
| Preceded by Joseph Mazurek | Attorney General of Montana; 2001–2009 | Succeeded by Steve Bullock |
| Preceded by Karla M. Gray | Chief Justice of the Montana Supreme Court; 2009–2025 | Succeeded by Cory Swanson |
