= Montana Supreme Court =

Highest court in the U.S. state of Montana

Coordinates: 46.586146°N 112.014021°W

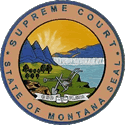
- Seal of the Montana Supreme Court
- Interactive map of Montana Supreme Court
- Established: 1864
- Jurisdiction: Montana, United States
- Location: Helena, Montana
- Composition method: Nonpartisan elections, midterm vacancies appointment by governor
- Authorized by: Montana Constitution
- Appeals to: Supreme Court of the United States
- Judge term length: 8 years
- Number of positions: 7
- Website: Official website

Chief Justice
- Currently: Cory Swanson
- Since: January 6, 2025

The Montana Supreme Court is the highest court of the state court system in the U.S. state of Montana. It is established and its powers defined by Article VII of the 1972 Montana Constitution. It is primarily an appellate court which reviews civil and criminal decisions of Montana's trial courts of general jurisdiction and certain specialized legislative courts, only having original jurisdiction in a limited number of actions. The court's chief justice and six associate justices are elected by non-partisan, popular elections. The Montana Supreme Court meets in the Joseph P. Mazurek Building in Helena, Montana, the state's capital, an international style building completed in 1982 and named in the honor of former Montana attorney general, Joseph P. Mazurek.

== History ==
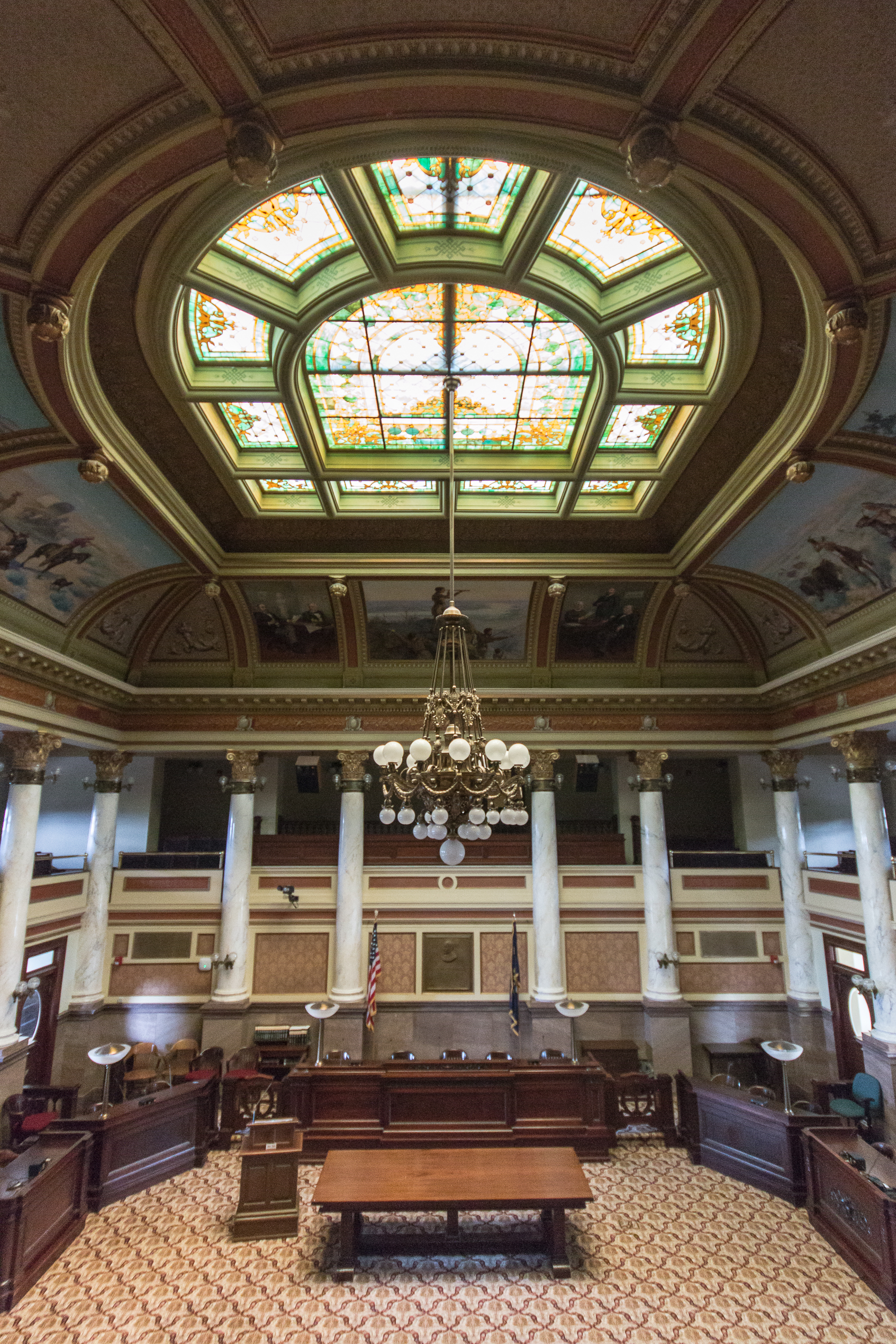
The Old Supreme Court in the Montana State Capitol in Helena

=== Montana Territorial Supreme Court ===
On May 26, 1864, the United States Congress passed the Organic Act, which formed the Montana Territory and established the Territorial Supreme Court. The court consisted of one chief justice and two associate justices, all of whom were appointed by the president of the United States and confirmed by the United States Senate; the court's first members were chosen by President Abraham Lincoln in 1864. The Montana Territorial Supreme Court held its first session in Virginia City, Montana, on May 17, 1865.

Each justice presided over one of the territory's three judicial districts, which meant that cases the Territorial Supreme Court heard on appeal were usually first tried in the Montana District Court by one of the justices. This arrangement was altered in 1886 when the Congress passed legislation that disqualified any justice who had previously participated in a case from hearing it on appeal; a fourth justice was also added to the court by the same act.

The Territorial Supreme Court rarely issued written opinions until 1872, when the Territorial Legislature established written reporting for the court. The Territorial Supreme Court held its last session on October 5, 1889; Montana became a state on November 8.

=== Montana Supreme Court ===
Article VIII of the 1889 Montana Constitution established the Montana Supreme Court, and provided that its three members would be elected to six-year terms. These elections were partisan until 1909, when the Montana Legislature enacted the Nonpartisan Judiciary Act. This prohibited partisan filings by judicial candidates and required that they instead be nominated by citizen petition. The resulting voter turnout in 1910 was minuscule (fewer than half those who voted on the partisan ballot for the Clerk of the Supreme Court voted for the Chief Justice on the non-partisan ballot) and so many considered the experiment to be a failure. The law was furthermore declared unconstitutional by the Montana Supreme Court in 1911 because it failed to provide any means for nominating candidates to newly created judgeships. Non-partisan elections were reinstated in 1935, when the legislature prohibited political parties from endorsing, contributing to, or making expenditures in support of or opposition to judicial candidates. Impact on voter participation was, by that time, less dramatic.

The membership of the court was increased by legislative act from three to five justices in 1919. The 1972 Montana Constitution, in Article VII, extended the judicial term of office from six to eight years, and allowed for the legislature to increase the number of associate justices by two members. In 1979 the legislature increased the size of the court from five to seven members to assist in handling the overburdened Court calendar.

== Court composition and selection ==
The Montana Supreme Court presently consists of a Chief Justice and six Associate Justices. The Montana Constitution provides for only four Associate Justices, but allows the Montana Legislature to increase the number of Associate Justices to six. Each justice is elected for an eight-year term in a statewide, nonpartisan election. The terms are staggered so that no more than two seats on the court are scheduled for election at the same time. When a sitting justice runs unopposed, voters cast a "yes" or "no" vote as to whether to retain them. If the seat on the court is contested, the top two vote-getters in the primary election are selected as the final candidates.

=== Appointments ===
If a vacancy occurs on the court during a term, it will be temporarily filled by an appointment process. The Judicial Nomination Commission submits a list of three to five candidates to the governor of Montana, who then must choose one from that list to appoint. If the governor fails to make a selection within thirty days of receiving the list, the Chief Justice or Acting Chief Justice makes the nomination.

All appointments must be confirmed by the Montana Senate, though recess appointments serve on the court until the next session of the Senate begins. If the Senate fails to confirm the appointee, the seat on the court will remain vacant and the selection and nomination process restarts. If confirmed, the appointee serves only until the next general election, and if then elected, only serves the remainder of the unexpired term to which they were initially appointed.

=== Qualifications ===
All justices of the Montana Supreme Court must be citizens of the United States and residents of Montana for at least two years immediately prior to taking office. They also must have been admitted to practice law in Montana for at least five years prior to the date of election. In Cross v. VanDyke, the Montana Supreme Court held that admitted to the bar meant even though VanDyke was not an active member of the bar for five years, he was still eligible to run as a candidate for justice since his active and inactive time combined for at least five years. Justices must reside within the state during their term.

=== Chief Justice ===
The chief justice is the administrative head of the Supreme Court. The chief justice presides over oral argument and court conferences, and represents the court at all official state functions.

The position of chief justice is filled directly by election, and candidates do not need to have previously served as an Associate Justice. Whenever the chief justice is temporarily absent, or permanently leaves the court during his term, the justice who is nearest the expiration of their term on the court presides as Acting Chief Justice.

=== Current members ===
Name	Born	Start	Term ends	Appointer	Law school
Cory Swanson, Chief Justice	November 25, 1976 (age 49)	January 6, 2025	2032	—N/a (Note: Took office after being elected in a nonpartisan election.)	Montana
James A. Rice	November 15, 1957 (age 69)	March 11, 2001	2030	Judy Martz (R)	Montana
Beth Baker	November 29, 1961 (age 64)	January 3, 2011	2026	—N/a	Montana
Laurie McKinnon	January 4, 1960 (age 66)	January 7, 2013	2028	—N/a	Baltimore
James Jeremiah Shea	April 13, 1966 (age 60)	June 2, 2014	2028	Steve Bullock (D)	Montana
Ingrid Gustafson	December 11, 1961 (age 64)	January 1, 2018	2030	Steve Bullock (D)	Montana
Katherine M. Bidegaray	April 27, 1960 (age 66)	January 2, 2025	2032	—N/a	Montana

=== Elected justices ===
Vacator	Reason	Start	Successor
Beth Baker	Term Expired	January 4, 2027	Amy Eddy

=== Other court personnel ===
The Clerk of the Montana Supreme Court is chosen by popular election for six year terms. The Clerk has the following duties by statute:

(a) keep the seal of the supreme court, its records and files, and the roll of attorneys and counselors at law;
(b) adjourn the court from day to day at the beginning of any term in the absence of any justice and until the arrival of a majority of the justices;
(c) file all papers or transcripts required by law to be filed;
(d) issue writs and certificates and approve bonds or undertakings when required;
(e) make out all transcripts to the supreme court of the United States;
(f) make copies of papers or records when demanded by law or the rules of the court; and
(g) perform other duties as may be required by law and the rules and practice of the supreme court.

MCA § 3-2-402.

The Marshall of the Supreme Court is appointed by the court, and is an employee of the judicial branch. The Marshall generally attends upon the Supreme Court during each term, and acts as a law clerk, executive officer, and court crier. He has the duty of serving all processes from the court within the state, and acts with the powers and duties of a sheriff to the District Courts when necessary.

== Jurisdiction ==
The Montana Supreme Court hears civil and criminal appeals directly from the Montana District Courts, which are the trial courts of general jurisdiction in the state; Montana is one of ten states in the United States that does not have a distinct intermediate appellate court. The court also hears appeals from the Montana Water Courts and the Montana Workers' Compensation Court, which are specialized courts established by the legislation rather than part of the judicial branch under the Montana Constitution.

The Montana Supreme Court has original jurisdiction over the so-called extraordinary writs, which include habeas corpus, injunction, review, mandate, quo warranto, and supervisory control. This jurisdiction is concurrent with the Montana District Courts.

The Montana Supreme Court also may exercise original jurisdiction in a case that has not been through a District Court if there are no facts in dispute and the case presents only legal or constitutional questions.

== Supervision of the courts and the practice of law ==
The Montana Constitution grants the Montana Supreme Court broad administrative authority over the state court system to ensure its efficient and effective operation. It has general authority to adopt rules of practice and procedure for the lower courts. It also regulates the admission of attorneys to the state bar, and the conduct of attorneys and judges generally. The Montana Supreme Court appoints the Court Administrator, who performs such duties as preparing and submitting the judicial budget to the legislature, compiling statistics on the business of the courts, and recommending improvements in the judiciary to the Supreme Court.

=== Boards and commissions ===
To fulfill its duties, the Montana Supreme Court manages twenty specialized boards and commissions, to which it appoints members to terms of either indefinite or specified length depending on the specific body. The structure of these commissions vary as well, such that some are composed exclusively of practicing attorneys, while others have a mixture of attorneys, judges, and laypeople.

- Advisory Commission on Rules of Civil and Appellate Procedure
- Board of Bar Examiners
- Civil Jury Instructions Guidelines Commission
- Commission of Continuing Legal Education
- Commission on Character and Fitness
- Commission on the Code of Judicial Conduct
- Commission on Courts of Limited Jurisdiction
- Commission on Practice
- Commission on Rules of Evidence
- Commission on Self-Represented Litigants
- Commission on Technology
- Commission on Unauthorized Practice
- Criminal Jury Instructions Commission
- District Court Council
- Equal Justice Task Force
- Gender Fairness Commission
- Judicial Nomination Commission
- Judicial Standards Commission
- Sentence Review Division
- Uniform District Court Rules Commission

== Procedures ==
=== Appeals from inferior courts ===
Appeals to the Montana Supreme Court are "appeals of right," meaning that the court does not have discretion as to whether it accepts review of the lower court's decision. Appeals are taken from both civil and criminal matters by a party filing a notice of appeal in the district court that issued the order or judgment from which the appeal is sought. Contempt orders are not appealable, and so can only be reviewed on application for a writ of review.

Criminal defendants may appeal only from final judgments of convictions, and other orders after judgment that affect substantive rights. Indigent defendants are guaranteed representation by counsel at the state's expense. The state does not have the right to appeal from acquittals or convictions, but may appeal from court orders or judgments that dismiss charges, modify verdicts, grant new trials, quash arrests or search warrants, suppress evidence, suppress confessions or admissions, grant or deny a change of venue, or impose a sentence that is contrary to law.

The supreme court may affirm, reverse, or modify any judgment or order appealed from and may direct the proper judgment or order to be entered or direct a new trial or further proceedings to be had. When a lower court's judgment is altered on review of civil matters, the court may order restitution for any property or rights that a party lost due to an erroneous order, either by ordering it directly, or by ordering to District Court to itself order it. On review of criminal matters, the Montana Supreme Court may reverse, affirm, or modify the lower court's judgment; set aside, affirm, or modify any proceedings subsequent to the judgment from which the appeal is taken; reduce the offence of which the defendant was convicted to a lesser included offense; reduce the punishment imposed by the lower court; or order a new trial.

=== Applications for original writs ===
Applications for original writs are filed directly with the Montana Supreme Court. The court may then order that a summary response from opposing parties be filed immediately, or may dismiss the application at its next conference without such an order. If a summary response is ordered, the court considers the filings at its next conference. The court will subsequently dismiss the application, accept jurisdiction, order more extensive briefing on any issue raised in the application or response, order oral argument in extraordinary cases, or issue any other writ or order deemed appropriate in the circumstances. Pending its disposition of the application for the writ, the court may stay a lower court's proceedings, on motion by a party for good cause shown, or sua sponte.

Individual justices may issue writs of habeas corpus on behalf of anyone held in custody for return to themselves, the full Supreme Court, or the District Courts. Individual justices may also issue writs of certiorari to review judgments of contempt.

=== Conference and argument ===
The Montana Supreme Court has promulgated Internal Operating Rules for its internal governance. The justices meet in conference twice a week to discuss pending matters. Its Tuesday conferences considers pending petitions for original jurisdiction, and matters that should be considered by the full court. Its Thursday conferences consider proposed opinions, petitions for rehearing, and appeal classifications. A five-justice panel determines how appeals to the Montana Supreme Court are reviewed by the court, such as for full oral argument before the court sitting en banc, or to be decided purely on the briefs submitted to either the court en banc or to a five-justice panel.

The court’s annual calendar was previously divided into four terms, but legislation effective January 6, 2006 changed this to one term, beginning on January 1 of each year. The Chief Justice may also call a special term at any time. Oral arguments are held before the court every month of the year except July and August. Briefs from amicus curiae are accepted only if all parties consent in writing, or the court grants leave on motion stating the interest of the applicant and the reasons why it should participate. A motion of an amicus curiae for leave to participate in oral argument is granted only for "extraordinary reasons."

A majority of the court is required for quorum, and a majority of the court must concur in all decisions. If a justice is disqualified or otherwise unable to participate in a case, a District Court judge is substituted, and their opinion is given the same weight in that case as a sitting justice.

=== Written decisions ===
By statute, all decisions of the Montana Supreme Court must be in writing, and must set forth the grounds of the decision. However, it is up to the court to decide whether an unelaborated order or a full opinion is appropriate. If a full opinion is to be issued, its drafting is assigned to a justice during conference. The court attempts to hand down its decision within 120 days of when the case is submitted. All justices must indicate their concurrence in the opinion by signing it, and all justices disagreeing with the majority's decision must indicate this in a written dissent.

=== Citations and case reporters ===
Opinions of the Montana Supreme Court are assigned a "public domain" or "neutral-format" case citation, which consists of the year of decision, the state’s postal abbreviation, and finally a sequential number; the court’s sixth decision handed down during 2006, for example, would have the citation 2006 MT 6. The citations of decisions that have been designated as not for publication are followed by an "N" (e.g., 2006 MT 6N), to indicate that those decisions should not be cited for precedential value in any court. All decisions have numbered paragraphs, so that pinpoint citations can be used without reference to print reporters.

The Montana Reports, published by State Reporter Publishing Company, is the official case reporter of Montana Supreme Court opinions. Its opinions are also included in the regional Pacific Reporter published by West Group. When citing to its previous decisions, the Montana Supreme Court cites to both print reporters as well as the neutral-format citation.

== Notable decisions ==
- State v. 1993 Chevrolet Pickup, 116 P.3d 800 (Mont. 2005). The court ruled 6–2 that a warrantless search and seizure of a man's trash did not violate his constitutional rights. Justice James C. Nelson's reluctant concurrence, which he based purely on existing court precedent, received significant attention for his dire warnings about the erosion of civil liberties. His opinion described the amount of personal information contained in trash, such as DNA, and the invasions of privacy he saw becoming more common in other areas of life. "I don't like living in Orwell's Nineteen Eighty-Four; but I do." He warned that "eventually, we are all going to become collateral damage in the war on drugs, or terrorism, or whatever war is in vogue at the moment."
- Columbia Falls Elem. Sch. Dist. No. 6 v. State, 109 P.3d 257 (Mont. 2005). The court unanimously ruled that the state's public school system violated the Montana Constitution's requirement for the Legislature to fund and establish free schooling so as to provide students with a "quality" education.
- Big Spring v. Jore, 109 P.3d 219 (Mont. 2005). The court ruled 6–1 that seven double-punched ballots in an extremely close election for a seat in the Montana House of Representatives should not have been counted, because ballots were only valid under state law if the voter's intent could be clearly determined. The invalidation of those seven votes gave the election to Democrat Jeanne Windham, whose win gave the Democrats the one seat they needed to have a majority in the Montana House. Had the trial court's counting of those votes been upheld, her opponent, Rick Jore, would have been the first Constitution Party candidate to have won an election at the state level.
- Snetsinger v. Mont. Univ. Sys., 104 P.3d 445 (Mont. 2004). The court ruled 5–3 that the ineligibility of gay and lesbian employees of the University of Montana for domestic partner benefits violated their right to equal protection under the Montana Constitution.
- Baxter v. Montana
- State v. Gryczan
