= Government of Montana =

Government of the U.S. State of Montana

- Great Seal of the State of Montana
- Polity type: Presidential republic Federated state
- Constitution: Constitution of Montana

Legislative branch
- Name: Legislature
- Type: Bicameral
- Meeting place: Montana State Capitol
- Upper house
- Name: Senate
- Presiding officer: Matt Regier, President
- Lower house
- Name: House of Representatives
- Presiding officer: Brandon Ler, Speaker

Executive branch
- Head of state and government
- Title: Governor
- Currently: Greg Gianforte
- Appointer: Election
- Cabinet
- Name: Cabinet
- Leader: Governor
- Deputy leader: Lieutenant Governor
- Headquarters: Montana State Capitol

Judicial branch
- Name: Judicial Branch
- Courts: Courts of Montana
- Supreme Court
- Chief judge: Cory Swanson
- Seat: Joseph P. Mazurek Building, Helena

As established and defined by the Montana Constitution, the government of the State of Montana is composed of three branches, the Executive, Judicial, and Legislative. The powers of initiative and referendum are reserved for the citizens of Montana.

The second and current state constitution was enacted in 1972. Among its changes, it stipulated that all Montanans' access to their government is a constitutionally protected right, and it includes the right to examine documents or to observe the deliberations of all public bodies or agencies of state government and its subdivisions.

== Legislative Branch ==
Like the federal government and 48 other states, Montana has a bicameral legislature composed of two chambers, a 100-member House of Representatives and a 50-member Senate. Legislators are elected by popular vote. As of 1992 term limits were enacted limiting House members to four 2-year terms, and Senate members to two 4-year terms. The Montana State Legislature convenes only on odd-numbered years, and for 90-day periods. In addition, state law allows for the legislature to be convened in special session by the governor or at the written request of a majority of the members. As of 2005, the Montana Legislature has been convened in special session thirty times in its history.

== Executive branch ==
The daily administration of the state’s laws, as defined in the Montana Code Annotated, are carried out by the chief executive—the Governor, and their second in command the Lieutenant Governor, the Secretary Of State, the Attorney General, the Superintendent of Public Instruction, the State Auditor, and by the staff and employees of the 14 executive branch agencies.

Elected Executive Officials in Montana
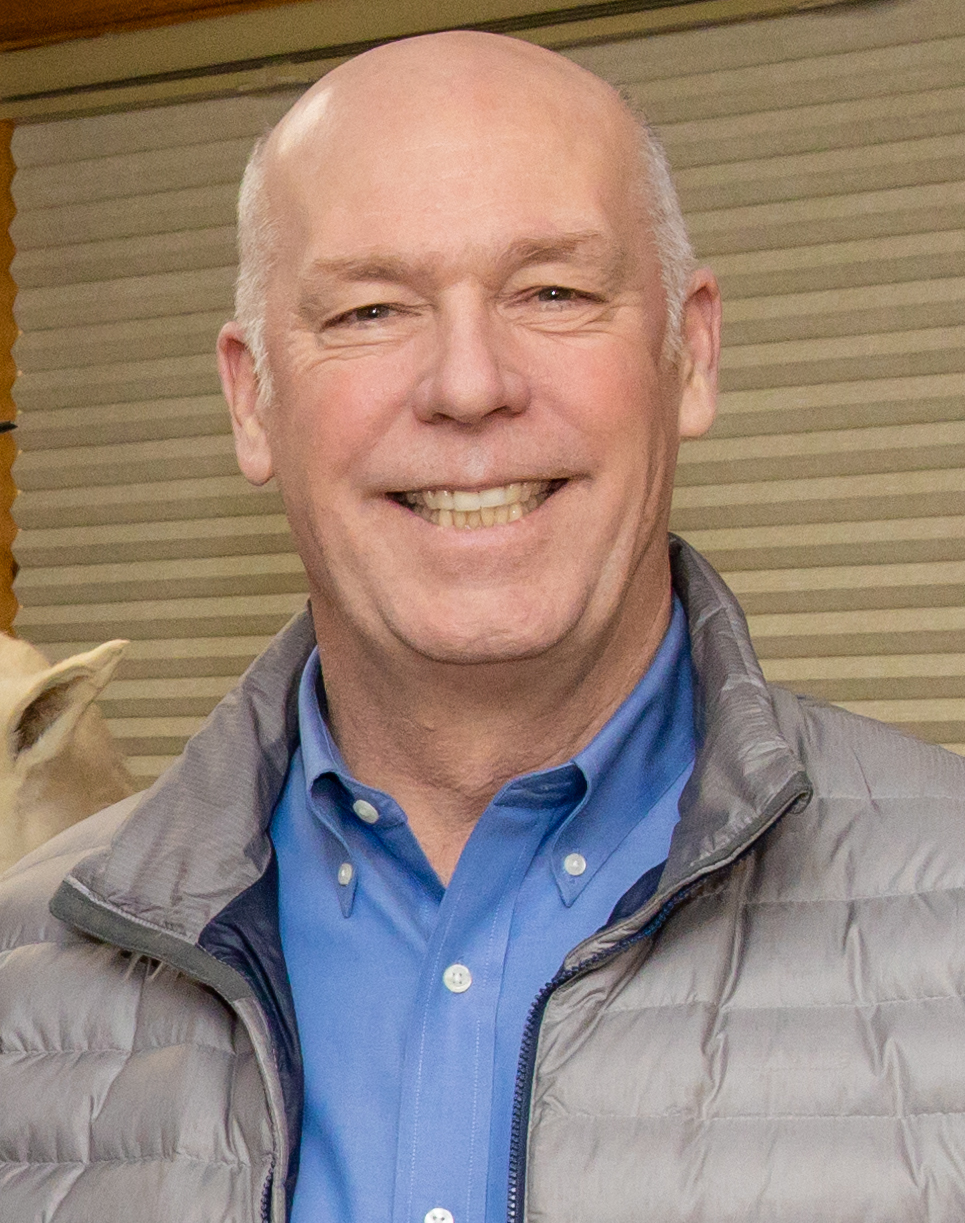
Greg Gianforte (R)
Governor

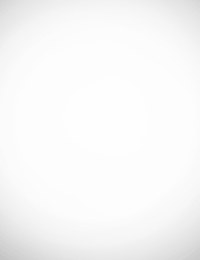
Kristen Juras (R)
Lieutenant Governor

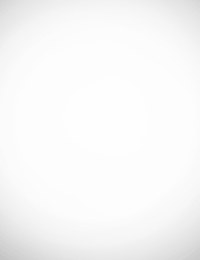
Christi Jacobsen (R)
Secretary of State

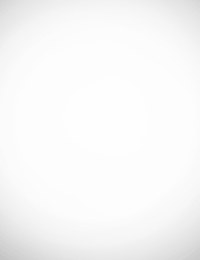
Austin Knudsen (R)
Attorney General

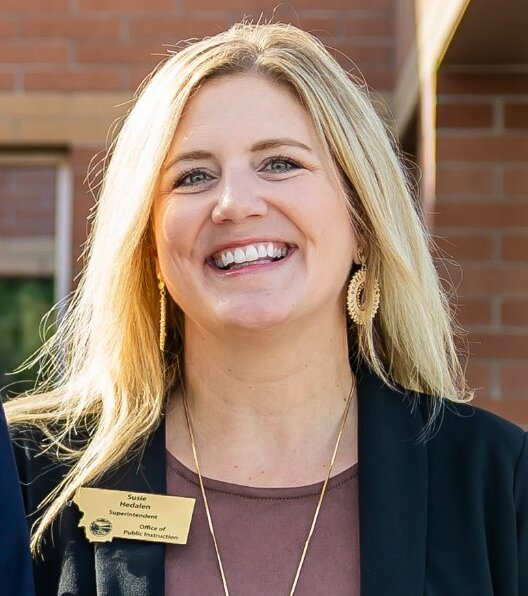
Susie Hedalen (R)
Superintendent of Public Instruction

Acknowledging the importance of providing for an orderly arrangement in the administrative organization of state government, the number of principal departments from which all executive and administrative offices, boards, bureaus, commissions, agencies and instrumentalities of the executive branch (except for the office of governor, lieutenant governor, secretary of state, attorney general, superintendent of public instruction, and auditor) must perform their respective functions, powers, and duties, is constitutionally limited to not more than 20 principal departments. Currently the state operates with 14 principal departments. Provision is made within the state constitution for the establishment of temporary commissions not allocated within a department.

=== Executive branch agencies ===
Department	Description
Administration	Provides general and administrative services in the areas of financial services, facilities management, public procurement, printing, mailing, surplus property management, architectural and engineering services, risk management and tort defense, personnel services, labor relations, information technology, and professional development.
Agriculture	Protects producers and consumers, enhances and develops agricultural and allied industries through its agricultural sciences and agricultural development divisions.
Commerce	Acts as an information broker for businesses and communities in the areas of economic and community development. Promotes Montana as a place to visit, to locate business, and to film motion pictures, commercials, documentaries, and features.
Corrections	Operates and administrates the state's adult and juvenile correctional facilities including the Montana State Prison located in Deer Lodge and the Montana Women's Prison located in Billings. Supervises probationers and parolees.
Environmental Quality	Protects, sustains, and improves a clean and healthful environment to benefit present and future generations. This is accomplished through managing, planning, and enforcing air and water quality laws and administrative rules. Remediation responsibilities include overseeing investigation and cleanup activities at state and federal Superfund sites to ensure compliance with applicable state and federal regulations, and to prevent exposure of potential human and ecological receptors to hazardous or toxic materials that have been released to soil, sediment, surface water, or groundwater.
Fish, Wildlife and Parks	Provides for the stewardship of the state's fish, wildlife, parks and recreational resources through the management of state fisheries, parks and trails, and regulates state wildlife resources. Enforces state fish, wildlife, and parks laws, as well as boating, snowmobile, off-highway rules and regulations.
Labor and Industry	Regulates and manages workers' compensation program, provides assistance to employers in filing quarterly wage reports and paying unemployment insurance tax, and administrates unemployment insurance claims for eligible unemployed workers. Upholds public policy as it relates to employment relationships and illegal discrimination. Through its workforce centers in cities across the state the agency provides job seekers and employers the resources and forums to maintain a high quality workforce.
Livestock	Primary mission is to control and eradicate animal diseases, prevent the transmission of animal diseases to humans, and to protect the livestock industry from theft and predatory animals. Conducts enforcement and investigative work in the tracking of livestock ownership and in the deterrence and/or solution of related criminal activities Also monitors and regulates the horse racing industry in the state.
Military Affairs	Oversees all activities of the Army and Air National Guard, Disaster and Emergency Services Division, and provides administrative support to the Veterans Affairs Division, which is administratively attached to the department. The department is administered by the Adjutant General and his staff.
Natural Resources and Conservation	Promotes stewardship of Montana's water, soil, forest, and rangeland resources; regulates forest practices and oil and gas exploration and production, and administers several grant and loan programs. The Fire and Aviation Management program is responsible for protecting 50,000,000 acres (200,000 km^{2}) of state and private forest and watershed lands from wildfire, while the Tree and Shrub Nursery program grows and sells seedlings for conservation and reforestation plantings on state and private lands.
Public Health and Human Services	The largest agency within state government, DPHHS administrates a wide range of public assistance programs including; Medicaid, Temporary Assistance for Needy Families (TANF), food stamps, special supplemental nutrition program for Women, Infants, and Children (WIC), Children's Health Insurance Plan (CHIP), energy assistance, child care assistance. Other programs and services provided by the agency include; adoption services, services for the aging, child support, disability services, drug & alcohol addiction, mental health services and facilities. Oversees the coordination of the public health system in Montana through organized efforts to prevent, identify, and counter threats to the health of the public. Programs range in scope from nutrition support and Health Education, to screening services, to preventive services and surveillance systems for infectious and chronic diseases.
Revenue	The agency responsible for; overseeing revenue collection activity and audits, verifying compliance with state tax laws, and for the valuation and assessment of real and personal property for property tax purposes. The agency also administers the state's Alcoholic Beverage Code, which governs the control, sale and distribution of alcoholic beverages.
Transportation	The agency responsible for transportation systems and services, including the state’s highway and rail systems, and air service. Primary responsibilities include; public transportation and rail programs and planning, general aviation airport planning, management of the state motor pool, maintenance of state highways, bridges and rest areas, motor fuel collection and enforcement, enforcement of vehicle weight and dimension laws and the Outdoor Advertising Control Act, and highway traffic safety. Duties include; planning and design activities, contract administration, materials design and testing, fiscal programming and cost accounting, and property acquisition.

=== Commissions, Councils, Boards and Offices ===
Advisory Council on Aging
Aeronautics Board
Banking Board
Board of Crime Control
Board of Environmental Review
Board of Housing
Board of Investments
Board of Pardons and Parole
Board of Public Assistance
Board of Public Education
Board of Research and Commercialization
Brain Injury Advisory Council
Burial Preservation Board
Capital Finance Advisory Council
Capitol Complex Advisory Council
Child & Family Services Advisory Councils
Children's Special Health Services Advisory Council
Coal Board
Commissioner of Political Practices
Consensus Council
Council on Homelessness
County Printing Board
Disability Advisory Council
Early Childhood Advisory Council
Economic Development Advisory Council
Electronic Government Advisory Council
HIV/AIDS Advisory Council

Information Technology Board
Interagency Coordinating Council
Land Information Advisory Council
Medicaid Drug Use Review Board
Mental Health Oversight Advisory Council
Montana Arts Council
Montana Heritage Commission
Montana Lottery
Montana State Fund
Office of Public Instruction
Office of the Commissioner of Higher Education
Office of the State Public Defender
Petroleum Board
Provider Rates & Services Commission
Public Employees Retirement System
Public Service Commission
Publishing Policy Committee
Reserved Water Rights Compact Commission
State Tax Appeal Board
State Workforce Innovation Board (SWIB)
Statewide Independent Living Council
Statewide Interoperability Executive Council
Teachers Retirement Board
Tobacco Prevention Advisory Board
Tourism Advisory Council
Transportation Commission
Vocational Rehabilitation Council
Worklife Wellness Advisory Council

== Judicial Branch ==
The highest court in the state is the Montana Supreme Court. The court hears cases pertaining to the disputes involving Montana State Government, and interprets; state statutes, the State constitution, and administrative rules. Unlike most state court systems and the federal judiciary, Montana does not have an intermediate appellate court; the State Supreme Court must hear all appeals. The Montana Supreme Court has other duties, including lawyer discipline and revisions of various rules, such as the Montana Rules of Civil and Appellate Procedure, the Rules of Professional Conduct that apply to Montana lawyers, and the Rules of Lawyer Disciplinary Enforcement that govern lawyer discipline cases. On occasion, the Montana Supreme Court also must determine whether to impose judicial discipline as recommended by the Judicial Standards Commission. The Montana Water Court adjudicates matters of water rights within the state.

The Judicial power of the State of Montana is vested in the following:

- The Supreme Court, consisting of a Chief Justice and six Associate Justices
- The District Courts
- The Workers' Compensation Court
- The Water Court
- The Courts of Limited Jurisdiction, which include Justice Courts, Municipal Courts, and City Courts.

== See also ==
- Montana Senate
- Montana State Legislature
- Montana State Capitol
- Montana Constitution
