= Montana Youth Courts =

American courts of law for minors

Montana Youth Courts are courts of law in the U.S. state of Montana which have jurisdiction over any minor charged with violating any state law or city and county city ordinance, except for fish and game ordinance violations and traffic violations. Appeals from Youth Courts are made directly to the Montana Supreme Court.

== Authority and jurisdiction ==
Montana Youth Courts were established by the Montana Youth Court Act of 1974 and today are part of the Montana District Courts. Each of the state's 22 judicial districts has a youth court. In judicial districts where there is only a single District Court Judge, this judge acts as the Youth Court Judge. In a judicial district where there is more than one District Court Judge, the judges select one of their members to act as Youth Court Judge. Selection may rotate among judges in a multi-judge district, but generally only the judge with the most experience in Youth Court is selected. In multi-county districts, the duties of the Youth Court may rotate between counties.

Any minor (defined in Montana as someone under the age of 18) accused of committing a misdemeanor or felony crime under state, county, or city law is generally tried by a Youth Court. Youth Courts may transfer minors to the jurisdiction of the District Court, on their own authority or after a motion by a City or County Attorney. Youth Courts have discretion to engage in "extended jurisdiction juvenile prosecution", which means that the Youth Court may continue to oversee the punishment, probation, or parole of an individual even after the individual has reached the age of 18. Youth Courts, City Courts, Justice Courts, and Municipal Courts have concurrent jurisdiction over alcoholic beverage possession, tobacco possession, and gambling violations committed by youth. Youth Courts do not have jurisdiction over fish and game ordinance violations and traffic violations.

Montana Youth Courts have supported a restorative justice model where youths are held accountable for criminal behavior while also receiving appropriate services to assist them in developing necessary life skills. Some youth charged with minor misdemeanors may be given a deferred prosecution and referred to community-based restorative justice programs funded through the Office of Juvenile Justice and Delinquency Prevention (OJJDP) in which the offender and victim work together to understand the crime and harm done, and come to a mutually agreeable solution. A goal of restorative justice is to allow the offender to take responsibility for their actions while implementing the solution.

== Procedures and staff ==
Youth Court staff consist of a chief probation officer, one or more juvenile probation officers, and support personnel. About 75 percent of youth brought before a Youth Court will never see the judge. Youth generally are brought to court after being charged or receiving a citation, and are referred to the Youth Court by another court or a juvenile agency (such as a school). These youth are referred to the Youth Court for probation. The defendant then appears before a probation officer with a parent, legal guardian, or attorney to answer the charge against them. This is known as the "informal process".

If the referring agency requests it, or if the "informal process" fails, the charge or citation will be handled by the city or County Attorney, who may file formal charges with the Youth Court. Known as the "formal process", the youth will then be tried before the Youth Court judge. If found guilty, punishment may include fines, community service, mandatory and regular drug and alcohol testing, placement in in-patient or out-patient drug or alcohol treatment, or placement in a juvenile correctional facility.

== Case law ==
Youth Courts are the equivalent of District Courts, the Montana Supreme Court has held.

In State v. Beach, 705 P.2d 94 (Mont. 1985)., (84-373) the high court held that, when a Youth Court has terminated, there is no bar to exercise of jurisdiction by the district court over felony proceedings against a minor. A District Court also has jurisdiction over an adult being tried for crimes committed when the defendant was a minor, under the high court's ruling in State ex rel. Elliot v. District Court, 684 P.2d 481 (Mont. 1984).

== See also ==
- Courts of Montana

== Bibliography ==
- Elison, Larry M.; Snyder, Fritz (2001). The Montana State Constitution: A Reference Guide. Westport, Conn.: Greenwood Press. ISBN 9780313273469.
- Fischer, Julie (June 2015). "2014 Youth Justice Council Report To The Governor And The Legislature" (PDF). Montana Board of Crime Control.
- State Bar of Montana (January 14, 2010). The Montana Citizen's Guide to the Courts (PDF) (Report). Helena, Mont.: State Bar of Montana.
- Van Ness, Daniel W.; Strong, Karen Heetderks (2015). Restoring Justice: An Introduction to Restorative Justice. New York: Routledge. ISBN 9781455731398.
