= Western tradition =

Western tradition can refer to:

- Western culture
- Western mystery tradition
- The Western Tradition, a 1989 television series of lectures by Eugen Weber
- American Tradition Partnership, a political organization also known as Western Tradition Partnership
- Western Tradition Partnership, Inc. v. Attorney General of Montana, a United States Supreme Court case regarding campaign finance
