= American tradition =

American tradition may refer to:

- Culture of the United States
- American Tradition Partnership, a political advocacy group
- Western Tradition Partnership, Inc. v. Attorney General of Montana, also known as American Tradition Partnership, Inc. v. Bullock, a US Supreme Court case involving the political group
