= Dorothy Eck =

American politician

Member of the Montana Senate
- In office 1980–2000
- Succeeded by: Emily Stonington

Personal details
- Born: Dorothy Fritz; January 23, 1924 Sequim, Washington, U.S.
- Died: September 23, 2017 (aged 93) Bozeman, Montana, U.S.
- Party: Democratic
- Spouse: Hugo Eck
- Relations: Diana L. Eck (daughter)
- Children: 1
- Education: Montana State University (MS)
- Occupation: Politician

Dorothy Eck (née Fritz; January 23, 1924 – September 23, 2017) was an American politician in the state of Montana. She served in the Montana Senate from 1980 to 2000. Eck was also active in feminist movements including the League of Women Voters and served as a delegate to the 1972 Montana Constitutional Convention.

== Life ==
Born Dorothy Fritz on January 23, 1924, she grew up with two sisters in Bremerton, Washington, where their father was Union Oil station manager. In 1946, she married Hugo Eck, and they moved to Bozeman, Montana, where Hugo taught architecture. Eck received her MS in applied science from Montana State University. The couple had two children. Her daughter Diana Eck is a Harvard professor of comparative religion.

Eck became active in the Bozeman League of Women Voters and became state president of that organization. She was elected as a delegate to Montana's 1972 Constitutional Convention and served as the western vice chair. She championed articles protecting Montanans' right to privacy, equal rights for women, and Indian Education for All. After the convention, she traveled with fellow delegates Betty Lee Babcock and Daphne Bugbee on a campaign to convince voters to ratify the new constitution. Eck served as a Democrat in the Montana Senate from 1980 until 2000.

Eck died at her home in Bozeman on September 23, 2017.

== See also ==
- Betty Lee Babcock
