= MWUA =

MWUA may refer to:

- Maine Water Utilities Association, a nonprofit supporting water works professionals and their systems across the State of Maine in the United States.
- Montana Water Use Act, see Montana Water Court.
- Multiplicative weight update algorithm.
