= Montana District Courts =

American state trial courts in Montana

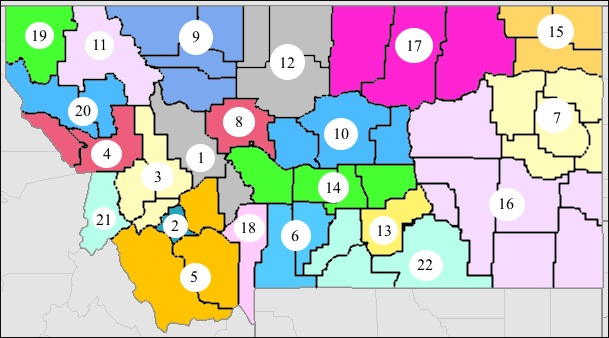
- The 22 judicial districts of the District Courts of Montana
- Established: 1889
- Jurisdiction: Judicial District
- Composition method: Non-partisan election
- Authorised by: Constitution of Montana
- Appeals to: Montana Supreme Court
- Appeals from: Justice of the Peace Courts, City Courts, and Municipal Courts
- Judge term length: Six years
- Number of positions: One to eight
- Website: courts.mt.gov/dcourt

Montana District Courts are the state trial courts of general jurisdiction in the U.S. state of Montana. Montana District Courts have original jurisdiction over most civil cases (at law and in equity), civil actions involving monetary claims against the state, criminal felony cases, naturalization proceedings, probate cases, and most writs. They may also hear certain special actions and proceedings, and oversee a narrowly defined class of ballot issues. Montana District Courts also have limited appellate jurisdiction regarding cases that arise in Justice Courts, City Courts, and Municipal Courts (Courts of Limited Jurisdiction) as well as Judicial review of decisions by state administrative law tribunals that fall under the Montana Administrative Procedures Act.

District Court judges are elected in nonpartisan elections for six-year terms. Mechanisms exist for removing judges for misconduct, and for filling vacancies between elections. There are 56 District Courts organized into 22 judicial districts, but only 51 District Court judges. Workload is a serious issue in the District Courts, which are assisted in their administrative tasks by a District Court Council.

== History ==
Montana became a state in 1889. A state constitution was drafted in 1884, which established a system of courts: A supreme court, district courts, county courts, justices of the peace, and municipal courts such as the legislature might see fit to create. Four judicial districts were created, each with a district court. National politics delayed Montana's statehood, however, in part because a significant number of other territories (Arizona Territory, Dakota Territory, Idaho Territory, New Mexico Territory, Utah Territory, Washington Territory, and Wyoming Territory) were all seeking statehood. Statehood for Montana was also stymied, specifically, because Montana voters of the day overwhelmingly favored the Republican Party. The Democratic-controlled United States House of Representatives routinely blocked Montana statehood to retain the status quo balance of power in Congress. The impasse was broken in 1888 when the Democratic Party amended its platform to favor the statehood of Republican-controlled territories, and the Republican Party amended its platform to favor the statehood of Democratic-controlled territories.

At the 1889 Montana state constitutional convention, delegates retained nearly all the language of the 1884 constitution. However, county courts were abolished and jurisdiction for probate given to district courts. The number of district courts was expanded to eight from four. The 1889 constitution also limited the creation of inferior courts (such as intermediate appellate courts, municipal courts, and small claims courts) only in state-incorporated cities or towns. The jurisdiction of district courts was specified somewhat in detail, and included both felonies and misdemeanors not otherwise assigned to another court. District courts acted as an intermediate court of appeals, and could not hear cases de novo. Impeachment powers were vested solely in the Montana Senate.

In 1972, Montana held a constitutional convention to update and revise its state constitution. Under the new constitution, District Courts now had jurisdiction only over criminal felonies, while criminal misdemeanors were handled by City Courts, Justice of the Peace Courts, and Municipal Courts. No longer was the legislature required to establish inferior courts only in incorporated cities or towns, and the District Courts were required to hear appeals de novo. The new constitution also authorized the legislature to establish a right to appeal the decisions of state agencies directly to district courts. Impeachment powers were changed as well. Now the Montana Senate and the Montana House of Representatives jointly vested with impeachment powers. The entire legislature could now specify the criteria for impeachment, establish whatever tribunal it wished, and provide for the procedures for impeachment.

== Jurisdiction ==
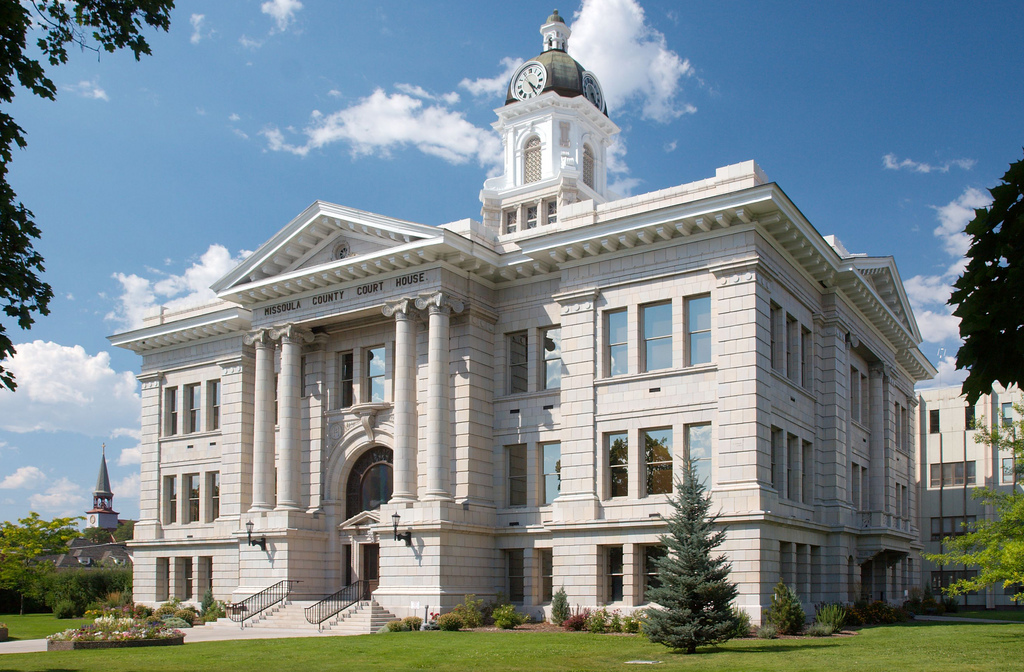
The Missoula County Courthouse, seat of the 4th Judicial District of the Montana District Court (which covers Mineral and Missoula counties).

District Courts in Montana have both original and appellate jurisdiction. Each District Court's process extends to all parts of the state, and the District Courts are courts of record.

=== Original jurisdiction ===
Article VII, Section 4 of the Constitution of Montana establishes the jurisdiction of Montana District Courts. District Courts have original jurisdiction in all criminal felony cases, all civil and probate matters, cases at law and in equity, civil actions involving monetary claims against the state, misdemeanors not falling under the jurisdiction of another court, and special actions or proceedings not otherwise provided for by law. District Courts have concurrent original jurisdiction with the justice of the peace courts over misdemeanors committed concurrently with a felony, misdemeanors arising from a reduction in the charge of felony, and misdemeanors found during trial in a District Court. District Courts also have the power to issue writs and naturalize citizens.

District Courts have the power to enforce the decisions of the Montana Water Court arising within their judicial district.

=== Appellate jurisdiction ===
Except as otherwise provided for by law, District Courts act as appellate courts for inferior courts, and must hear cases de novo. Justices of the Peace Courts are not "courts of record", which is why District Courts must try "the matter anew, the same as if it had not been heard before and as if no decision had been previously rendered." Appeals from City Courts and Municipal Courts which are, by law, defined as "courts of record" are the two exceptions, and such appeals are limited to a review of the record and questions of law.

=== Case law on standing, jurisdiction, and appeals ===
According to legal experts Larry M. Elison and Fritz Snyder, none of the pre-1972 Montana Supreme Court rulings regarding District Courts appear relevant today. Nearly all these cases dealt with very narrow interpretative issues, such as the equity jurisdiction of District Courts and the development of extraordinary writs. These cases reflect the narrow jurisdiction granted to District Courts under the 1889 constitution, which was significantly expanded in the 1972 state constitution.

Montana Supreme Court rulings on standing in District Courts is straightforward and traditional, relying on a widespread, national legal consensus. The most important cases are Stewart v. Board of County Commissioners of Big Horn County, 573 P.2d 184 (Mont. 1977). and O'Donnell Fire Service and Equipment v. Billings, 711 P.2d 822 (Mont. 1985).

Several Montana Supreme Court cases since 1972 have clarified the jurisdiction of the District Courts. The state supreme court held in State v. Davis, 681 P.2d 42 (Mont. 1984). that District Court jurisdiction cannot be waived or conferred by consent of the parties. Youth Courts, created by the Montana Youth Court Act in 1974, are the equivalent of district courts, the Montana Supreme Court held in In re T.L.G. & M.E.H., 692 P.2d 1227 (Mont. 1984). In Steve v. Beach, 705 P.2d 94 (Mont. 1985)., the high court held that, when a Youth Court has terminated, there is no bar to exercise of jurisdiction by the district court over felony proceedings against a minor. Further, the court held in State ex rel. Elliot v. District Court, 684 P.2d 481 (Mont. 1984)., a District Court has jurisdiction over an adult being tried for crimes committed when the defendant was a minor. Jurisdictional conflict is common in Montana, as the state is home to several sovereign Indian reservations and non-resident landowners are common. The right of the Montana District Court to exercise original jurisdiction in a probate case involving a judgment by an out-of-state court was upheld by the Montana Supreme Court in In the Matter of the Estates of Jeffrey Connor Wilhelm, Deceased, 760 P.2d 718 (Mont. 1988). This case is even more notable because the out-of-state court was a United States district court in New York. Two cases have concerned District Court jurisdiction over agreements made on tribal land. Where one party is a tribal member and the other party is a non-member, but both reside on a reservation, District Courts have no jurisdiction the Montana Supreme Court has held (Geiger v. Pierce, 758 P.2d 279 (Mont. 1988).). However, where an attorney licensed to practice law in the state of Montana creates a contract which is to be performed both on tribal land and on state land, that attorney cannot evade the jurisdiction of the District Court by claiming tribal membership (Crawford v. Roy, 577 P.2d 392 (Mont. 1978).).

The unique constitutional provision for direct appeal of the ruling of an executive branch agency to a District Court has also been clarified by the Montana Supreme Court. In School District No. 12 v. Hughes, 552 P.2d 328 (Mont. 1976)., the state supreme court held that the failure of the state legislature to provide for direct appeal is no bar to such an appeal when the legislature has also provided for a general administrative appeal by statute. But only the legislature, not the executive branch, has the power to create such an appeal, the court said in Nye v. Department of Livestock, 639 P.2d 498 (Mont. 1982).

== Selection ==
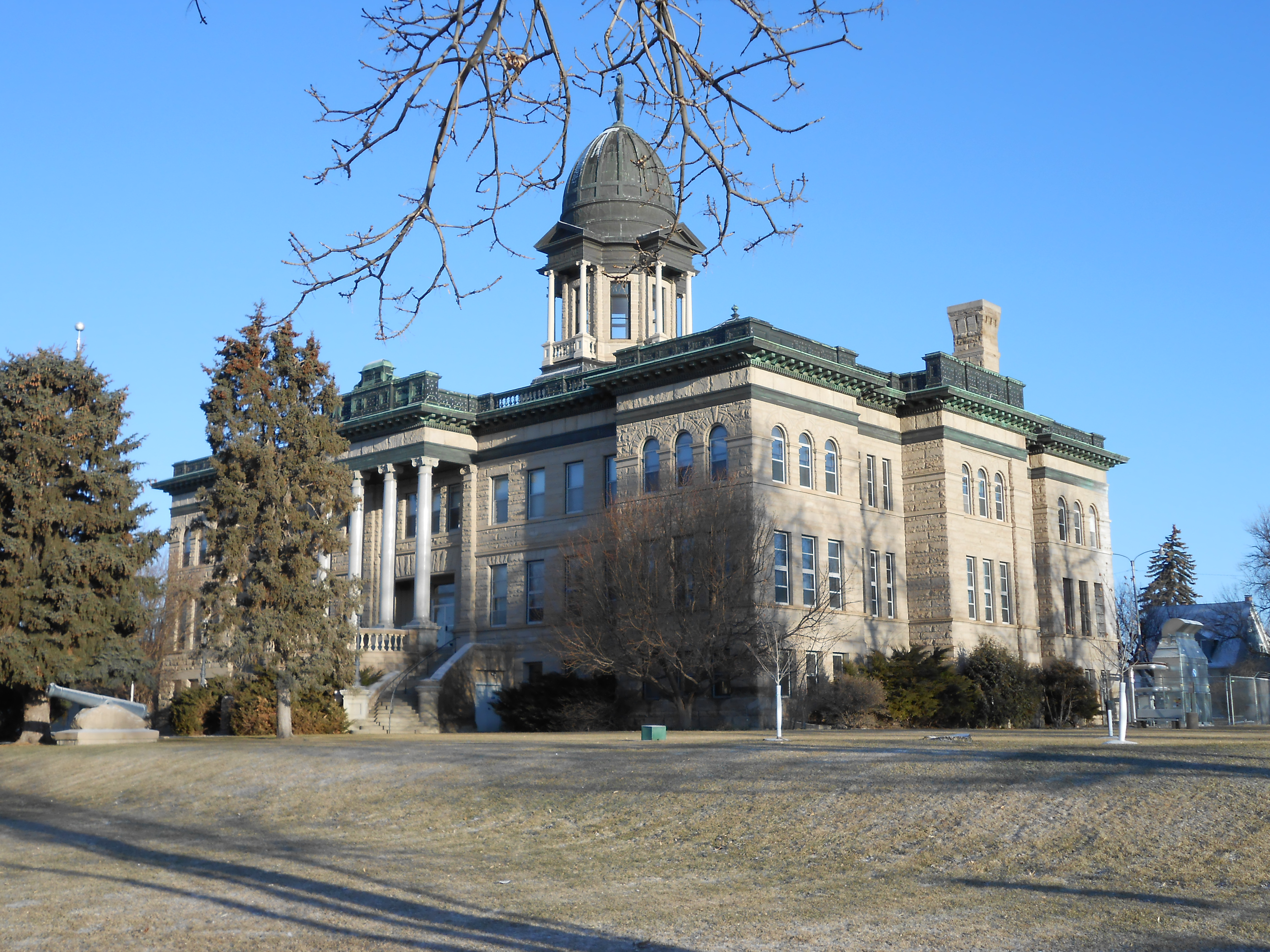
The Cascade County Courthouse, seat of the 8th Judicial District of the Montana District Court (which covers Cascade County).

=== Judicial elections ===
Article VII, Section 8 of the Constitution of Montana provides for the election, rather than appointment of District Court judges. The 1889 constitution limited District Court judges to four-year terms. The state legislature enacted a law in 1909 mandating these elections be nonpartisan, and providing for nomination by citizen petition. The Montana Supreme Court struck down this law in 1911 after finding that it provided for no means of nominating judges in newly created judicial districts.

In 1935, the state legislature enacted new legislation barring political parties from endorsing, making contributions to, or making expenditures on behalf of or against judicial candidates. In 1972, the new state constitution extended the terms of District Judges to six years. In the wake of the U.S. Supreme Court's ruling in Citizens United v. Federal Election Commission, 558 U.S. 310 (Sup.Ct. 2010)., Western Tradition Partnership, a group which promotes free market solutions to environmental problems, sued to overturn the 1935 law. The Montana Supreme Court upheld the law in Western Tradition Partnership, Inc. v. Montana, 2011 MT 328 (Sup.Ct. 2011). But a year later, the U.S. Supreme Court overturned the ruling in American Tradition Partnership, Inc. v. Bullock, 567 U.S. ____ (Sup.Ct. 2012)., which opened the door to vastly increased PAC and political party spending on judicial races in Montana. In 2012, a Frontline documentary, Big Sky, Big Money, revealed that American Tradition Partnership (the new name of Western Tradition Partnership) had not registered as a political committee under Montana law. American Tradition Partnership spent little money in Montana in 2013, but began spending heavily again in judicial races in 2014. The American Tradition Partnership ruling led to record spending of $1.6 million in the 2014 Montana Supreme Court races. Spending surpassed that in the 2016 contests.

=== Qualifications for election and office-holding ===
The 1889 constitution permitted anyone to run for the office of District Court judge, so long as they were a citizen, had reached the age of 25, were licensed to practice law in the state, and had resided in Montana for at least a year. While judges had to resident in their district, candidates could run in any judicial district in the state. The 1972 state constitution changed this by requiring that candidates for District Court be licensed to practice law in the state of Montana for at least five years and have resided in the state of Montana for at least two years. It deleted the age requirement, and prohibited judges from holding office in a political party.

=== Vacancies ===
Article VII, Section 10 of the Montana constitution requires a District Court judge to forfeit their position if they file for an elective public office (other than a judicial position) or are absent from the state for more than 60 consecutive days. Originally, Title 3, Chapter 1, Part 6, §607 and §608 of the Montana Code Annotated barred a District Court judge from running for a Montana Supreme Court position, and barred an Associate Justice of the Supreme Court from running for the position of Chief Justice. The Montana Supreme Court ruled these provisions of law unconstitutional in 1984. In 2010, the Montana Supreme Court held that "elective public office" did not include tribal office. Thus, a state judge could run for tribal office without running afoul of Article VII, Section 10.

Article VII, Section 8 of the Montana constitution governs vacancies on District Courts. Under the 1972 constitution, the Governor of Montana nominated a replacement according to whatever manner was prescribed by law. Subsequent state law provided for the creation of a Judicial Nomination Commission, whose duty was to draw up a list of potential replacements for the governor to choose from. If the governor declined to make the nomination within 30 days, the Chief Justice of the Montana Supreme Court was empowered to do so. The 1972 constitution gave the Montana Senate the power to confirm or deny the nomination. Appointments were valid until the end of the next legislative session. If the appointed judge ran for election and was unopposed, voters were to be given the choice to "retain/do not retain". Although the constitution was silent on the issue, incumbent elected judges who ran unopposed were automatically re-elected to their judgeship.

By the late 1980s, a worrisome situation had emerged. First, in 1974, state law was changed so that the legislature met every two years, not every year. Second, rulings in the late 1980s by the Montana Supreme Court and advisory opinions issued by the Attorney General of Montana permitted appointed District Court judges to not face an election until after confirmation by the Montana Senate—even if this meant that the judge served past the formal expiration date of their term. This created a situation in which a judge could conceivably resign immediately after the legislature adjourned, and remain on the bench for up to three years. The judge could then resign before the election. After the election, the governor could appoint a temporary judge once more, and again that judge could serve for up to three years. This clearly defied the will of the 1972 state constitutional convention, which wanted judges elected by voters rather than appointed by governors. By 1992, 41 percent of all District Court judges were appointed, and had never faced voters.

In 1992, the Montana Legislature referred a constitutional amendment to voters closing the appointment loophole by limiting appointed judges to the term of their predecessor. The "retain/do not retain" choice was also applied to incumbent elected judges as well. Voters approved the amendment in November 1992.

=== Impeachment and removal ===
Article V, Section 13 of the 1972 Montana state constitution gives the legislature the power of impeachment over judges. The Montana Legislature may prescribe causes for impeachment. Impeachment may be brought only by a two-thirds vote of the House of Representatives, and conviction and removal from office may occur only by a two-thirds vote of the Senate. Impeachment does not bar civil or criminal prosecution.

State law also provides for the censure, disability retirement, removal, or suspension of a judge. The law established a Judicial Standards Commission (JSC), which was authorized to receive and investigate complaints, allow the accused to defend him or her self, and make recommendations to the Montana Supreme Court. The Supreme Court then would decide if punishment were warranted, and, if so, what type of punishment.

The Montana Supreme Court twice ruled on the Judicial Standards Commission's investigative procedures. In State ex rel. Shea v. Judicial Standards Commission, 643 P.2d 210 (Mont. 1982)., the high court ruled that charges against judges had to rise to the level of constitutionally proscribed misconduct in office before the JSC could investigate. Following the Shea decision, the Montana Legislature clarified the procedural requirements, so that the JSC could engage in an initial investigation without a verified, written complaint. Beyond that, however, the legislature now required the JSC to obtain a verified, written complaint. In State ex rel. Smartt v. Judicial Standards Commission, 50 P.3d 150 (Mont. 2002)., the high court affirmed the JSC's power to subpoena documents. In that case, a preliminary JSC investigation uncovered evidence that the Montana Department of Justice was conducting a criminal investigation of a judge. The JSC obtained documents about the criminal investigation, and found they warranted a sanction against the judge.

In 2014, the high court addressed the issue of whether it could sanction a judge without a formal recommendation from the JSC. In this case, a District Court judge had voluntarily admitted his misconduct, and the JSC recommended public censure to the Supreme Court. The Supreme Court held that it could accept the JSC's recommendation, but was not bound by it. It could, if it wished, impose a harsher sanction (and did so). However, the court also held that because the judge had voluntarily admitted misconduct but had not agreed to submit to sanction, the judge should be offered the opportunity to withdraw his voluntarily admission. This would trigger a new, formal JSC investigation.

== Organization ==
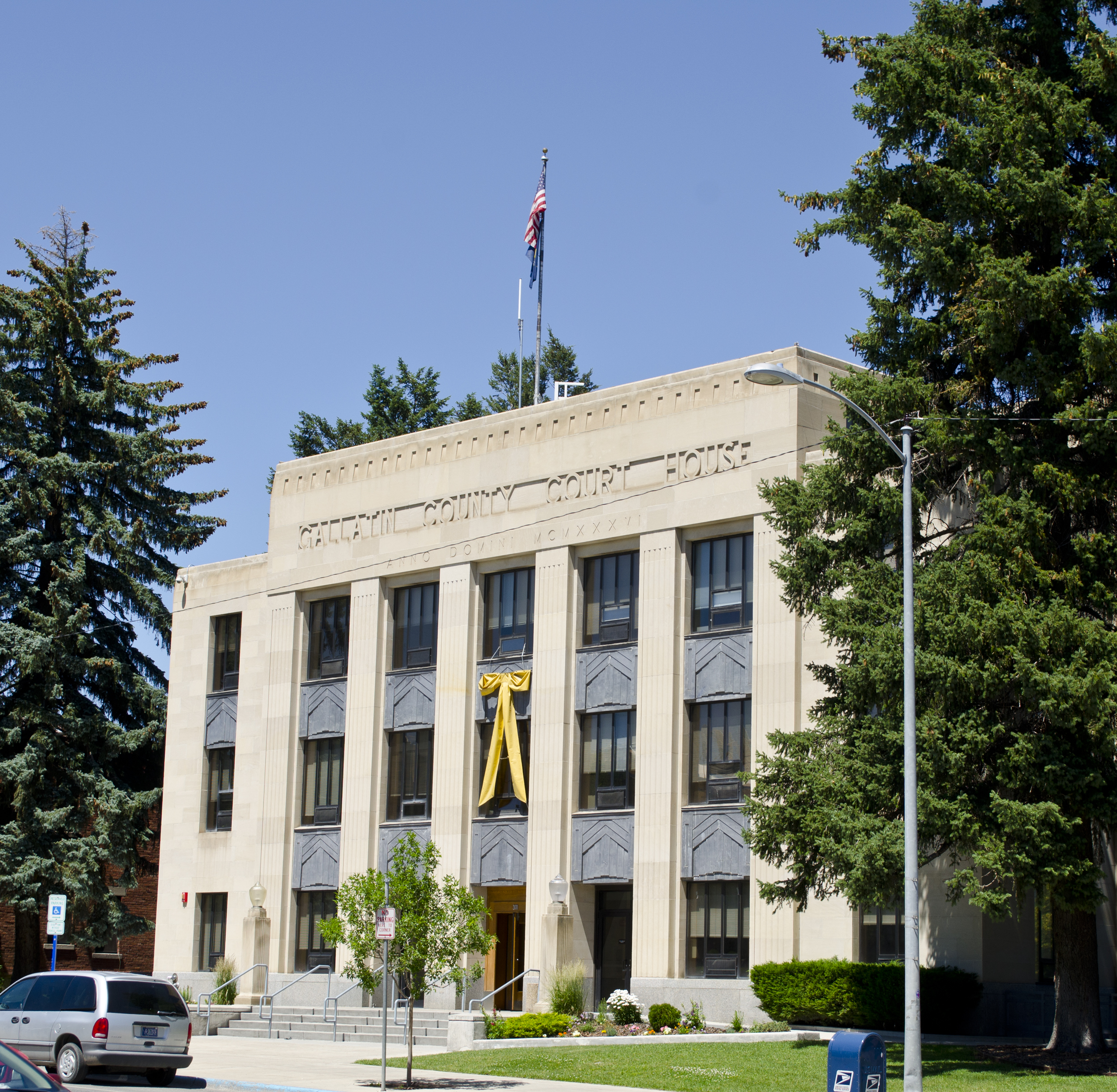
The Gallatin County Courthouse, seat of the 18th Judicial District of the Montana District Court (which covers Gallatin County).

The 1889 state constitution provided for dividing the state into seven judicial districts. Article VII, Section 6 of the 1972 constitution permitted the state legislature to determine the number of judicial districts, with the proviso that each district be composed only of whole counties, and that each county in the district be adjacent. The article also permitted the Chief Justice of the Montana Supreme Court to assign District Court and other judges to temporary service in another judicial district or in another county. The state has maintained the number of courts at 56 and the number of judicial districts at 22 for some decades.

Article VII, Section 6 of the 1972 constitution set District Court judicial terms at six years.

Montana Code Annotated, Title 3, Chapter 1, Part 1, §125 requires each county to provide space to the District Court. This includes a courtroom, administrative office space, and other space as needed for court operations. The costs of this space are born by the state.

Montana Code Annotated, Title 3, Chapter 5, Part 1, §102 establishes the number of judges in each judicial district. As of 2016, the number of judges was:

- Six judges in the 13th District (Yellowstone County)
- Four judges each in the 1st (Lewis and Clark and Broadwater counties), 4th (Missoula and Mineral counties), 8th (Cascade County), and 11th Districts (Flathead County)
- Three judges in the 18th District (Gallatin County)
- Two judges each in the 2nd (Silver Bow County), 7th (Dawson, McCone, Prairie, Richland, and Wibaux counties), 16th (Carter, Custer, Fallon, Garfield, Powder River, Rosebud, and Treasure counties), 20th (Sanders and Lake counties), and 21st Districts (Ravalli County).
- One judge each in all other districts.

The number of judges is very low considering the workload. In 2002, Montana District Courts heard 10,673 civil cases and 7,046 criminal cases. Yet, in 2003, the maximum number of judges in a judicial district was just four. The total number of judges was 42 in 2006, and 43 in 2011. Judges have been added to the system only irregularly, in 1979, 1983, 1999, 2001, 2005, and 2009. As of the end of 2016, there were just 46 judges, and only the 13th District had been permitted by the legislature to expand beyond four judges.

An independent study of District Court workload in 2016 found that the state needed another 21 District Court judges to bring workload levels down to acceptable levels. In the busiest judicial districts, 46 district court judges and four special masters were doing the work of 65 judges. In the 8th Judicial District, the number of divorce cases was so heavy that judges stopped hearing cases; all divorce cases were handled by special masters.

In 2017, the state legislature considered several solutions. One bill would have added two judges in the 13th District, and one judge each in the 4th, 8th, and 11th Districts. The House passed a bill in mid-February which added two judges to the 13th District, and just one to the 4th and 11th. None of the proposals for adding judges would put a judge on the bench until 2019. Another proposal suggested shifting some counties with heavy workloads into districts with low workloads, but the vast distances in the state discouraged this. Although some legislators have suggested increasing the use of binding arbitration, even in criminal law, the Montana Supreme Court ruled in Kloss v. Edward D. Jones & Co., 57 P.3d 41 (Mont. 2002). that this would violate a citizen's fundamental rights to a jury trial, due process, and equal protection, among others.

=== Drug court ===
Drug courts are not actual courts, but rather a separate docket used by District Courts and some inferior courts. The docket provides specialized attention to misdemeanor or felony crimes, child abuse and child neglect cases, and juvenile cases involving individuals addicted to drugs or alcohol. Drug courts provide treatment as well as sanctions, with the goal of treating addiction, reducing recidivism, and improving rehabilitation. Drug courts rely heavily on drug and alcohol addiction treatment programs; frequent, mandatory drug testing; reduced sentencing and other incentives to encourage the individual to stay in treatment; and much more regular, much more frequent judicial oversight.

=== District Court Council ===
Montana Code Annotated, Title 3, Chapter 1, Part 16 establishes a District Court Council to develop and adopt policies and procedures regarding the administration of the District Courts. Court procedures, court reporter needs, fees, human resource management, resource allocation, technology, and workload and work schedules are among the items the District Court Council is required to address. The council consists of the Chief Justice of the Montana Supreme Court and four District Court judges (at least one of whom must not be from a major city). Ex officio members include at least one chief juvenile probation officer nominated by the Montana Juvenile Probation Officers Association, one District Court clerk nominated by the Montana Association of Clerks of District Courts; one county commissioner nominated by the Montana Association of Counties; and one court reporter nominated by the Montana Court Reporters Association.

=== Case law regarding organization ===
The Montana Supreme Court has twice had occasion to rule on administrative issues facing District Courts. In State v. Daugherty, 29 P. 735 (Mont. 1979)., the issue was the substitution and disqualification of District Court judges. If a District Court has not published rules regarding substitution and disqualification, the high court said, then Montana Supreme Court rules regarding the same hold sway. In State ex rel. District Court v. Whitaker, 618 P.2d 1097 (Mont. 1984)., the issue was whether a District Court could continue to operate even though its budget for the fiscal year had ended. Here, the Supreme Court said that District Courts had the authority to order the state to pay reasonable and necessary expenses.

== See also ==
- Courts of Montana

== Bibliography ==
- Boone, Mary (2004). Uniquely Montana. Chicago: Heinemann Library. ISBN 9781403446480.
- Elison, Larry M.; Snyder, Fritz (2001). The Montana State Constitution: A Reference Guide. Westport, Conn.: Greenwood Press. ISBN 9780313273469.
- Rausch, John David Jr. (2006). "Montana". In Hogan, Sean O. (ed.). The Judicial Branch of State Government: People, Process, and Politics. Santa Barbara, Calif.: ABC-CLIO. ISBN 9781851097562.
- Porterfield, Jason (2011). Montana: Past and Present. New York: Rosen Central. ISBN 9781435894860.
