= Montana Water Court =

Court of law in Montana, USA

- 45.668306°N 111.066385°W
- Established: 1979
- Jurisdiction: Statewide
- Location: Bozeman, Montana, U.S.
- Coordinates: 45.668306°N 111.066385°W
- Composition method: Appointed
- Authorised by: Montana Water Use Act of 1973, as amended
- Appeals to: Montana Supreme Court
- Judge term length: Four years
- Number of positions: Two
- Website: courts.mt.gov/water

Chief Water Judge
- Currently: Russ McElyea
- Since: July 1, 2013
- Lead position ends: June 30, 2017

Associate Water Judge
- Currently: Stephen Brown
- Since: February 4, 2019

The Montana Water Court is a court of law in the U.S. state of Montana which has jurisdiction over the adjudication of water rights. The filing, verification, recording, and enforcement of water rights in the Montana Territory and, later, the state of Montana were considered highly inadequate until 1972, when a new state constitution required a more robust, highly centralized water rights legal system. Implementation of this system led to the establishment of the Water Court in 1979, after six years of mixed success with an administrative solution. The Water Court consists of a Chief Water Judge, Associate Water Judge, and four District Water Judges, but most work is handled by special masters ("water masters"). The process of identifying, verifying, and adjudicating water rights is a complex one, and budgetary and personnel issues have slowed the work at times. Appeals from the Water Court are made directly to the Montana Supreme Court.

The state finished verifying all water claims in 2015, and the Water Court will finish issuing final decrees in all hydrological basins by 2020. The Water Court's work is expect to end in 2028, although there is ongoing debate about termination in the state legislature. The state has not engaged in a process which includes all water claimants, leading the state to negotiate compacts with tribal governments and federal agencies.

== History of water rights in Montana ==
=== Territorial water rights ===
The Montana Territory was created on May 26, 1864. In 1885, the Montana territorial legislature enacted legislation establishing the first system of water rights for surface water. Under the law, surface water could only be diverted if it was done so for "beneficial use". An individual could establish their water rights merely by posting a notice at the point of diversion, and filing a letter with the county clerk and county recorder. This became known as a "filed right". Filed rights were subject to extensive abuse, as filers routinely exaggerated the amount of water taken and there was no means of challenging the claim of beneficial use. The law also recognized another means of securing surface water rights, which became known as "use rights". Use rights required no filing or posting, merely the appropriation of water and its application for a beneficial use. (Note: Under the law, use rights established prior to 1885 were dated as of the date work began on the diversion facilities. After 1885, use rights were dated to the day water was first diverted.) Use rights were also regularly abused, as there was no record of them and deceit about the date and amount of appropriation was widespread. By 1974, between 60 and 70 percent of all water rights in Montana were use rights.

The 1885 law also gave territorial officials the authority to engage in inter se ("including all parties") proceedings regarding a given source of surface water whenever conflict emerged. The official could establish who had water rights, how much water they were entitled to, and which rights had priority. This authority was never exercised.

Decentralized record-keeping created a huge number of problems. Watersheds routinely became "oversubscribed" (that is, water users claimed the right to more water than was in the stream). The expansion in the number of counties in the state led to the mismanagement of water rights records as county archives were split up, and many records were lost. Other records were lost when county courthouse suffered fires. (Note: Montana had just 16 counties when statehood was approved in 1889. By 1900, it had 24 counties, and 50 counties by 1919. Six more counties were created by 1925. This number has remained steady ever since.)

=== Water rights under the 1889 constitution ===
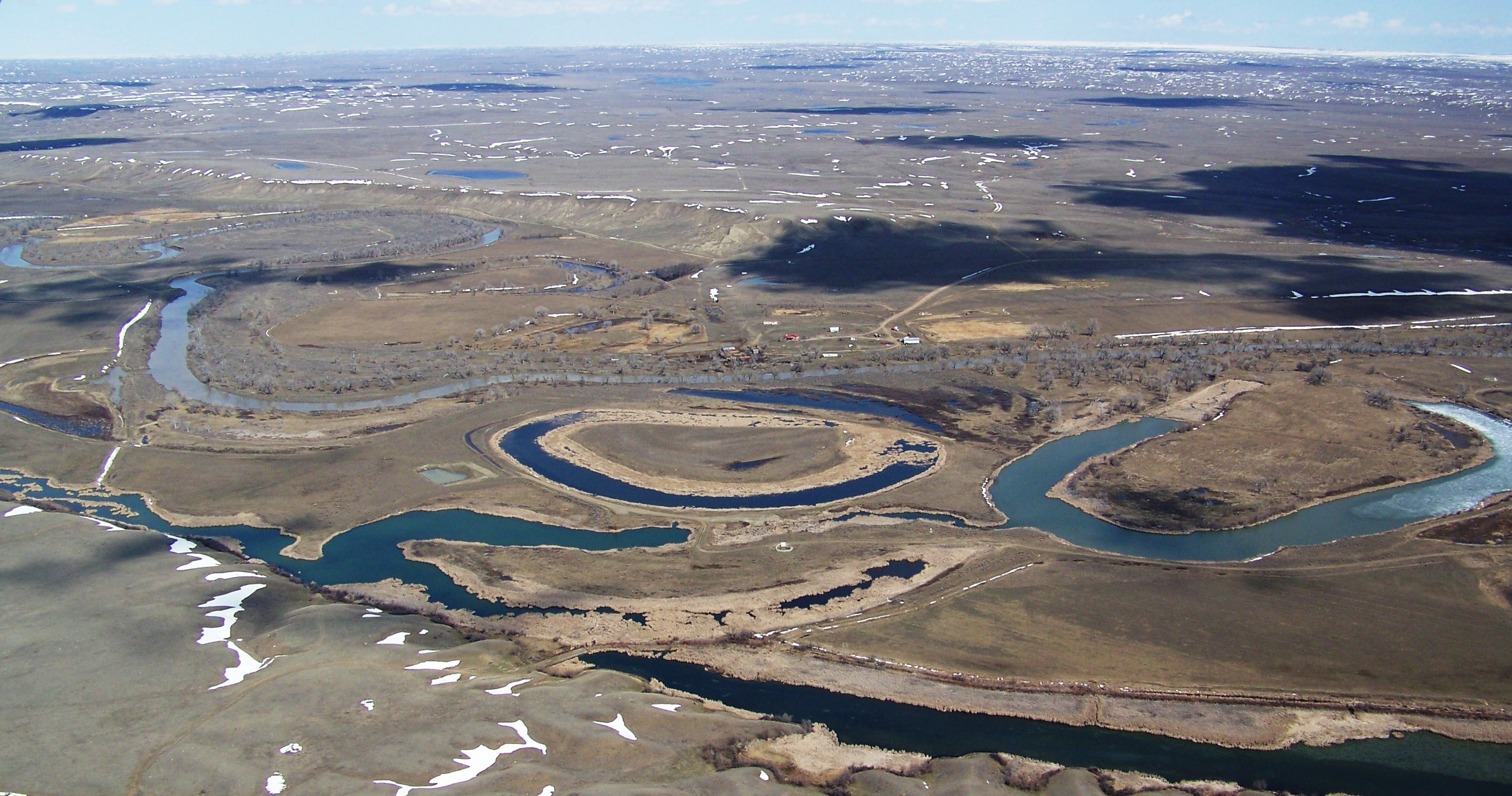
The Milk River in Montana, subject of the U.S. Supreme Court decision in Winters v. United States.

Montana became a state on November 8, 1889. Article III, §15 of the 1889 constitution provided that "The use of all water now appropriated...shall held to be a public use." Although a number of attempts were made over the next 90 years to create a centralized water rights system, beginning in 1903, voters in the state feared the creation of a large state bureaucracy and the legislature defeated every attempt.

In 1908, the Supreme Court of the United States held in Winters v. United States, 207 U.S. 564 (Sup.Ct. 1908). that Native American tribes had reserved "adequate water to satisfy the purposes for which the Reservation was created". Moreover, it was the duty of the U.S. federal government to protect these water rights. This created what are known as "Winters rights", of federally-reserved Indian water rights. The case was of particular importance to Montana because it involved the Fort Belknap Indian Reservation in the north-central part of the state.

In 1921, the Montana Legislature adopted a new surface water rights law. This legislation recognized that some streams might be "fully adjudicated"; in other words, all the water may be appropriated by existing users. Any new individual wishing to appropriate water from a fully adjudicated source had to obtain approval from a Montana District Court first. As no stream in the state was ever fully adjudicated, this process was never activated. Moreover, decentralized and haphazard record-keeping as well as ongoing utilization of use rights meant that it was almost impossible to determine if a stream was fully adjudicated, even if all water rights on the source were allocated. Indeed, it is possible that water rights were established on fully adjudicated sources. The Montana Supreme Court also recognized the "first in time, first in right" doctrine of water rights in 1921 in Mettler v. Ames Realty Co., 201 P. 702 (Mont. 1921).

Winters rights were further defined in 1939, when the U.S. Supreme Court held in Powers v. United States, 305 U.S. 527 (Sup.Ct. 1939). that Native American water rights existed independent of state law. This case had arisen on the Crow Indian Reservation in south-central Montana, and involved land now owned by non-tribal members. The federal Ninth Circuit Court of Appeals extended Powers in United States v. McIntire, 101 F.2d 650 (9th Cir. 1939)., when it held that title to water rights reserved to tribes could be disposed of only by Congress. This case involved the Flathead Indian Reservation in the state's northwestern corner. (Note: The Montana Supreme Court applied Winters and Powers to Montana water rights in Lewis v. Hanson, 124 Mont. 492 (Mont. 1951). and Big Four v. Bisson, 132 Mont. 87 (Mont. 1957). Winters referred only to surface waters. The U.S. Supreme Court extended the reasoning in Winters to groundwater in Cappaert v. United States, 426 U.S. 128 (Mont. 1976).) The same year as Winters, the Montana Legislature declared it was the policy of the state to fully adjudicate all the waters of the state as soon as possible. But no action was taken.

The state legislature took a step toward rectifying the situation in 1947. The legislature enacted a statute which gave the state engineer the authority to adjudicate water rights and settle disputes. However, there is no evidence that this discretion was ever exercised. A second step was taken in 1961 when the legislature passed the state's first water rights act, and barred any new use right claims after January 1, 1962.

In 1952, Congress enacted the McCarran Amendment, which permitted the federal government to waive its sovereign immunity over water rights. This waiver could be granted only if the state water rights proceeding was inter se. (Note: While the U.S. Supreme Court has never ruled on whether groundwater claimants must be included for a proceeding to be inter se, the Ninth Circuit Court of Appeals ruled in United States v. Oregon (44 F.3d 786), 44 F.3d. 786 (9th Cir. 1994). that McCarran Act proceedings could move forward even though groundwater users were not included.)

The Montana state legislature enacted a groundwater rights claiming law in 1961. The law mimicked the 1885 filing right system. Because the 1961 legislation suffered from the same faults as the 1885 legislation, water rights established under the 1961 groundwater law proved just as difficult to verify, examine, establish, and enforce.

Montana voters approved the creation of a state constitutional convention in 1971 to update and revise the 1889 constitution. By this time, water rights in the state were almost impossible to verify or enforce. The Montana Supreme Court had held in State ex rel. McKnight v. District Court, 111 P.2d 292 (Mont. 1941). that inter se proceedings were not required when adjudicating water rights. This meant that even when the Montana Supreme Court ruled on a water rights conflict, there often many appropriators not bound by the decision. Water rights records were dispersed (sometimes across many counties), grossly inaccurate, and incomplete. Many water rights laid claims to amounts of water that could never be used, calling into question the legality of the claim, and purchasers of water could never be sure of obtaining the amount of water they had bought.

=== Water rights under the 1972 constitution ===
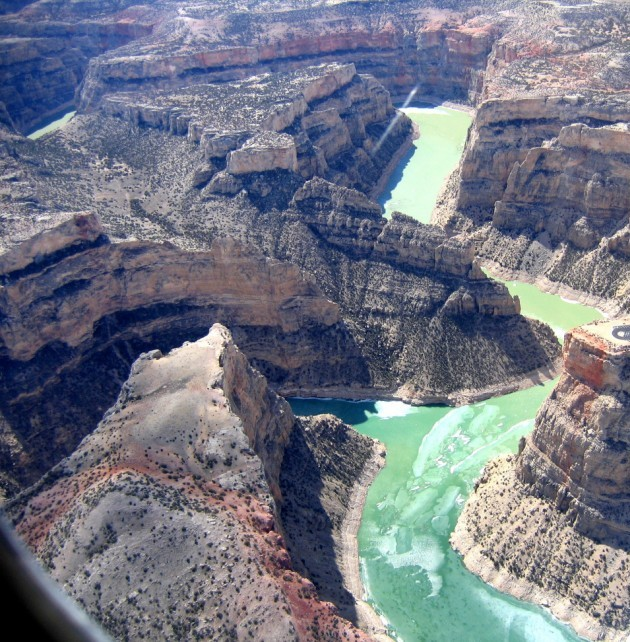
The Bighorn River in Montana. The DNRC declared the Bighorn River watershed one of five where water rights most urgently needed adjudication.

In 1972, Montana voters adopted a new constitution which greatly expanded the state's treatment of water and water rights. Article IX, Section 3, Subsection 1 recognized and confirmed all existing water rights. Subsection 2 reiterated the 1889 constitution's wording, with only minor and non-substantive changes. Subsection 3, however, established state ownership of all waters (atmospheric and ground, as well as surface) within the state, declared them available solely for the use of the people, and declared that appropriation of water must be for beneficial purposes. Subsection 4 required the state to administer, control, and regulate water rights, and to establish a centralized record of such rights. At no time did the 1971 constitutional convention recognize the control over Native American water rights exercised by the federal government under Winters and Powers.

In 1973, pursuant to the authority provided in the new constitution, the Montana Legislature enacted the Montana Water Use Act (MWUA). (Note: The MWUA also repealed previous state water rights laws. Even decreed water rights had to be re-adjudicated under the new law.) The goal of the MWUA was to identify every groundwater source and surface watershed in the state, and to adjudicate every water claim on these sources. The law required that anyone with a water right must file that claim with the state within one year. The Montana Department of Natural Resources and Conservation (DNRC) was to administer the MWUA. The DNRC identified five watersheds where water rights most urgently needed adjudication: The Armells Creek, Bighorn River, Powder River, Rosebud Creek, and Tongue River basins. The scope of work soon proved overwhelming. In late 1974, based on its preliminary efforts in these five areas, the DNRC estimated there were more than 500,000 water rights claims in the entire state. The lack of records, overclaiming of water, and amount of conflict over water was so bad, to process all water rights claims would take 100 years.

In 1974, the DNRC proposed legislation to amend the MWUA to require a Montana District Court to commence the adjudication proceeding, rather than the DNRC. The agency believed that a judicial, rather than purely administrative, proceeding would avoid lengthy litigation.

=== Creating the Water Court ===
In an attempt to pre-empt the impending change to state law, the Tsehéstáno (also known as the Northern Cheyenne) brought suit in the United States District Court for the District of Montana in January 1975 to secure their Winter rights. The federal government joined their suit in March, and initiated a separate suit on behalf of the Apsáalooke (also known as the Crow Nation) in April. The state legislature amended the MWUA according to the recommendation of the DNRC during its spring 1975 session. The state of Montana then filed in Montana District Court in July to begin adjudication of water rights in watersheds affecting both the Tsehéstáno and Apsáalooke. The Tsehéstáno and Apsáalooke lawsuits were consolidated by the federal court, but then stayed because of the conflict between the concurrent state and federal actions. A separate case, Colorado River Water Conservation District v. United States, 424 U.S. 800 (Sup.Ct. 1976)., also involving concurrent state and federal lawsuits over water rights, was moving to the U.S. Supreme Court. The high court subsequently created a new Colorado River doctrine of abstention. The U.S. Supreme Court "made clear that absent a proper McCarran waiver of tribal sovereign immunity a Tribe cannot be joined in a state court water adjudication." The decision also extended the McCarran Amendment's waiver to Native American water rights as well. The Supreme Court's decision in Colorado River essentially ended the two federal and one state Montana water rights cases.

The Supreme Court's ruling in Colorado River motivated the Montana Legislature to enact critical amendments to the MWUA in 1979. In 1977, the DNRC began pressing for a general water adjudication law. The agency proposed that anyone who failed to register their water claim with the state would lose that claim. It recommended against the creation of a water court, and instead argued for an administrative process overseen by the agency itself. The subsequent adjudication would be inter se, to meet the requirements of the McCarran Act. Rather than act on the DNRC's proposals, the state legislature established a study committee to make recommendations to the legislature at its next session (to be held in 1979). On April 4, 1979, the legislature voted to include tribal and federal as part of the state's adjudication process. The following day, the federal governments filed four lawsuits in the U.S. District Court seeking to revive the two prior lawsuits as well as initiate four others to protect the water rights of the tribes in Montana. Despite the action, the Montana Legislature enacted wide-ranging amendments to the MWUA which created a state Water Court.

== Montana Water Court ==
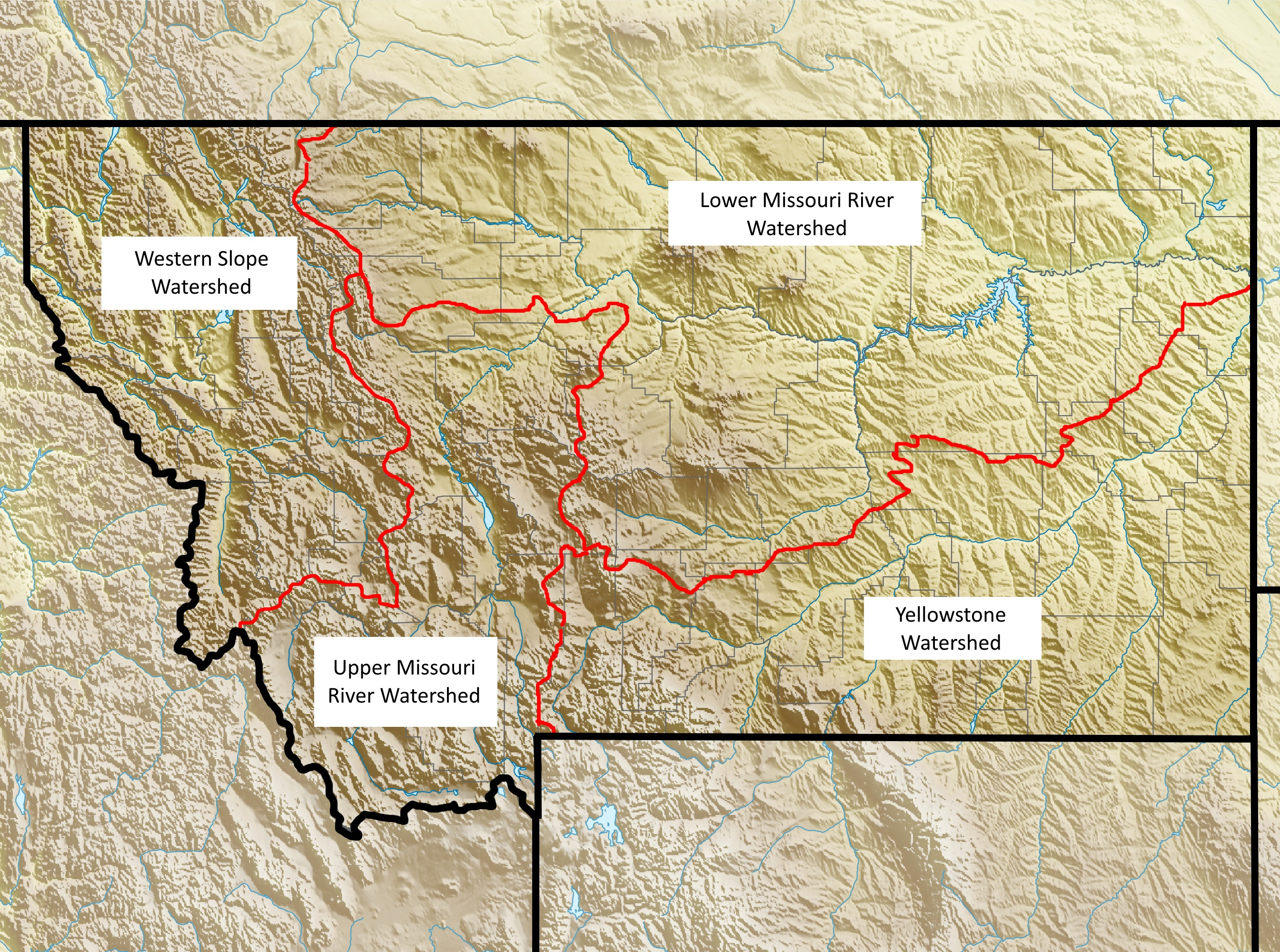
Approximate boundaries of the divisions of the Montana Water Court.

=== Legislative authority of 1979 ===
The 1979 amendments to the MWUA established a Water Court equivalent to Montana District Courts. The Water Court, whose headquarters were in Bozeman, was given jurisdiction over all water rights claims and adjudications in the state. There was only a single Water Court in the state, but it had four jurisdictions, based on the four largest watersheds within the state boundaries:

1. Yellowstone River Basin Division—This division covers the Yellowstone River and Little Missouri River watersheds, as well as all water in Carter County.
2. Lower Missouri River Basin Division—This division covers areas drained by the Missouri River below the mouth of the Marias River, as well as all water in Glacier and Sheridan counties.
3. Upper Missouri River Basin Division—This division covers areas drained by the Missouri River to the mouth of the Marias River.
4. Clark Fork River Basin Division—This division covers areas drained by the Clark Fork River and Kootenay River, as well as all water in Lincoln County.

The four judges of the Water Court were to be appointed from among the existing Montana District Court judges by the Governor of Montana. The legislature made retired district court judges eligible in 1981. Water judge candidates were proposed by a committee of Montana District Court judges in those judicial districts encompassed by the division. (Note: Montana law has established 22 judicial districts. Eleven of these are multi-judge districts. The nominating committee consisted of the chief judge in each multi-judge district covered (in whole or in part) by the division, and each judge of a single-judge district covered (in whole or in part) by the division.) Each judge served an initial six-year term. After June 30, 1985, terms were four years. The MWUA amendments permitted (but did not require) the Montana Supreme Court to also appoint a Chief Judge. The Chief Judge is selected by the Chief Justice of the Montana Supreme Court from a list developed by the Montana Judicial Nomination Committee.

The 1979 amendments to the MWUA provide for the appointment of special masters (known as "water masters" under the law). Water masters must have extensive experience with water law, water rights, and water use. Water masters apply water right claims examination rules adopted by the Montana Supreme Court, and must follow the Montana Rules of Civil Procedure. (Note: As the DNRC began to verify water claims, the agency began to make decisions about what was a verified claim and what was not. These sometimes verged on adjudicating water rights claims, and conflict between the DNRC and Water Court emerged. In 1987, the Montana Supreme Court issued a ruling declaring that it would promulgate water claims examination rules which would clarify and separate the roles play by the DNRC and Water Court. Under these rules, the DNRC is permitted to flag uncertain information for future determination by the Water Court. The Water Court is also permitted to consider more than one water claim at a time.)

Water masters examine nearly all the water claims, and make almost all the initial water allocation determinations. These are then reviewed by the Chief Water Judge. Only very rarely does a District Water Judge hear a case.

=== Procedures ===
In June 1979, the Montana Supreme Court ordered that all water rights claims be filed by April 30, 1982. This resulted in roughly 219,000 water rights claims in 85 sub-basins in the state of Montana. The legislature enacted a law in 1995 allowing approximately 4,500 additional claims to be filed, although these claims may be considered only after "on time" water claims are adjudicated.

The first step in adjudicating water rights claims is to have the claim verified in county or state records and (when needed) examined in the field by the DNRC. The claims are then turned over to the Water Court, which assigns a water master. The water master makes a preliminary decree (also known as a "temporary preliminary decree"), in which "first in time, first in line" rights are assigned and water allocations established. The water master must issue a notice advising the public that a preliminary decree has been made, and advertise this notice. Anyone may object to a claim. The special master then decides these claims in a two-party adversarial hearing. Once all objections have been resolved, a revised decree is issued and public notice given. Public hearings follow, in which the special master will accept evidence and take testimony. The special master will incorporate the public hearing into a final decree, which is recommended to the Chief Water Judge. The Water Court then holds a trial, almost always overseen by the Chief Water Judge, at the end of which objections to the rulings of the water master may be heard and the final decree is rendered. The Water Court has never held a trial in which all parties come together inter se.

If two water appropriators come into conflict during this process, they may submit their dispute to the nearest Montana District Court. The District Court will then refer it to the Water Court, which will issue a decree for temporary relief pending final adjudication.

All water rights claims will also be filed in a centralized repository, with county-level claims filed locally in each county courthouse. The DNRC continues to process new applications for water rights, and occasionally makes changes to existing rights claims. To file a claim for surface water requires the submission of an application to the DNRC. No permit is needed to use groundwater so long as no more than 35 US gallons (130 L) of water per minute are used, and less than 10 acre-feet (12,000 m^{3}) per year are withdrawn. Groundwater consumption over these limits requires a permit from the DNRC.

=== Appeals ===
Final decrees of the Montana Water Court may be appealed to the Montana Supreme Court, but only if the claimant had objected to the preliminary decree or if the claimant's water rights were altered after the issuance of the preliminary decree. All water rights not addressed in the final decree are considered forfeit under state law.

== History of the Water Court ==
=== Judge Lessley tenure ===
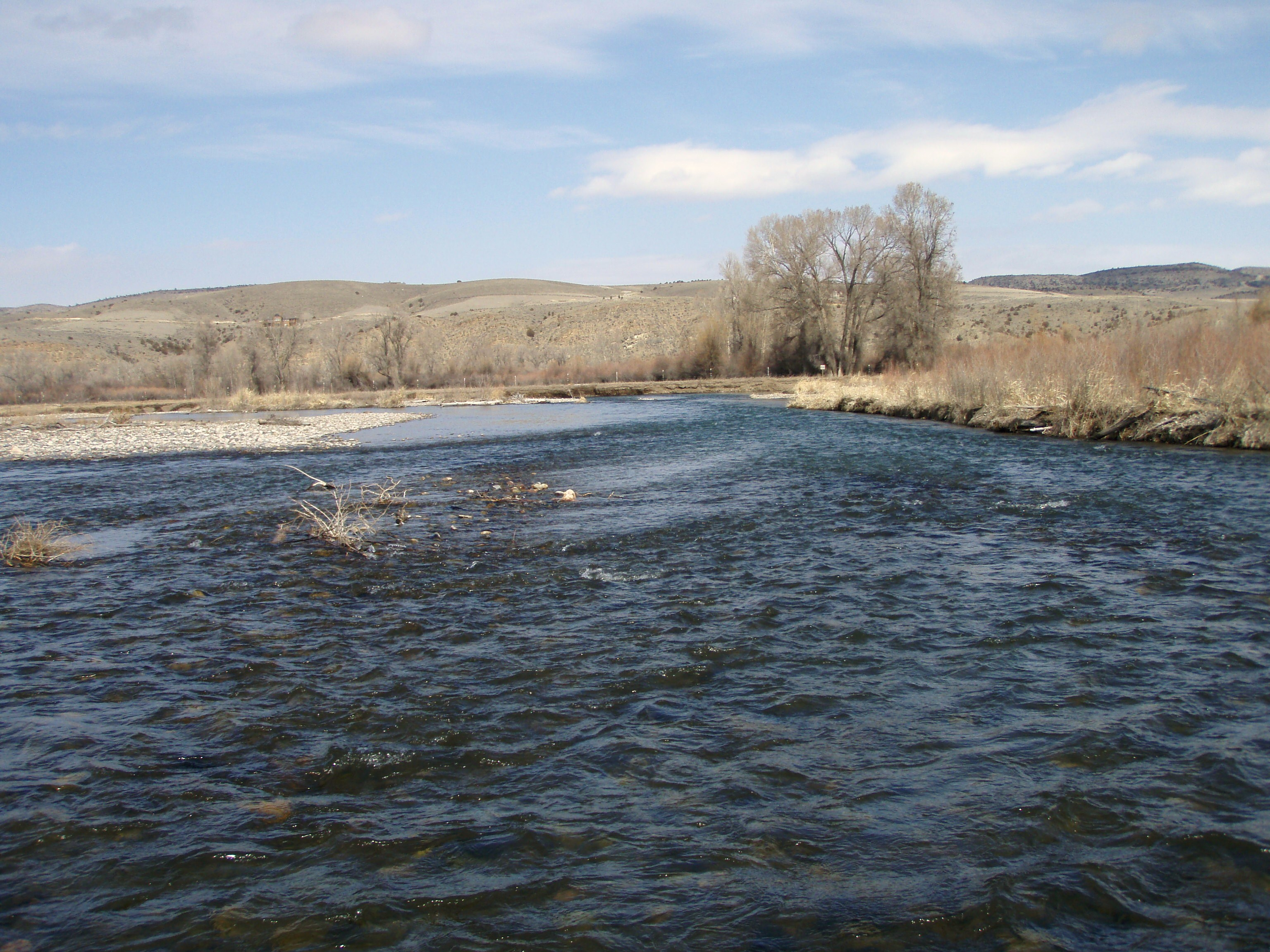
The Gallatin River near Manhattan, Montana. A preliminary decree governing 5,699 water rights claims was issued for the Gallatin River sub-basin, but objections were not resolved until 1997.

About 219,000 water rights claims in 85 sub-basins were filed before the close of the filing period in 1982. Every year from 1979 to 1997, the Chief Water Judge's office handled between 2,000 and 3,000 water claims. Water masters handled the remainder of the claims. Although verification of water claims can be swift, resolution of objections to the preliminary decree can last a decade or more. Roughly 40 to 50 percent of water rights claims have a problem with verification, priority, or an objection. For example, the Gallatin River basin preliminary decree was issued on September 18, 1985. There were 5,699 water rights claims in the basin, and 1,600 objections to the preliminary decree. Those objections were not resolved until 1997.

William Wallace Lessley was appointed the first Chief Judge of the Water Court in 1979. He had served as judge of the 18th Judicial District since 1949. He served as a substitute judge on the Montana Supreme Court more than 50 times and wrote more than 25 majority opinions between 1949 and 1982. In 1982, his judicial peers elected him Associate Water Judge for the Upper Missouri River Basin Division. He died of a stroke in office on March 29, 1990, at the age of 82. (Note: Judge Lessley was born May 27, 1907, in Fayette, Missouri. His family moved to a farm in Gallatin County, Montana, when he was a young boy. Lessley graduated from Gallatin County High School in 1925' received his bachelor's degree in English literature from Central Methodist College in 1929; received his Master of the Arts degree in English literature from the University of Washington in 1935, and his J.D. from the University of Michigan Law School in 1938. He was admitted to the Montana Bar in 1938. He retired as a Montana District Court judge in 1982. He continued to hold both the Chief Water Judge and Associate Water Judge positions until his death. He was the longest-serving jurist in Montana history.)

=== Judge Loble tenure ===
C. Bruce Loble was appointed Chief Water Judge in 1990 to serve the remaining three years of Lessley's term. (Note: Born in Helena, Montana, in 1947, he received his bachelor's degree from the University of Montana in 1969 and his J.D. from the University of Montana Law School in 1972. He was admitted to the Montana State Bar in 1972. After serving as a trademark attorney with the U.S. federal government in Washington, D.C., Loble returned to Helena and entered private practice as a water and natural resources lawyer.) During Loble's tenure, the Montana Legislature began cutting the budget of the DNRC and Water Court, which dramatically slowed claims verification and adjudication.

By 2004, the Water Court had just six water masters and four clerks, and an annual budget of $1 million. Full adjudication, which was to have taken 10 years, had stretched to 25 years with no firm end in sight. Preliminary decrees had yet to be issued in 30 sub-basins.

The slow pace of adjudication led the Montana Legislature to direct the Environmental Quality Council (EQC) to undertake a study of the Water Court and MWUA in 2003. (Note: The Environmental Quality Council is an independent agency of the Montana Legislature. It was created in 1971 with the passage of the Montana Environmental Policy Act. The Council's members include six state senators, six state representatives, and four members of the public. The governor (or the governor's representative) is an ex officio member of the Council. State law gives the council a wide variety of legislative oversight duties, as well as directs it to act as a policy advisor to the legislature.) The EQC determined that the slow pace of adjudication would take another 30 to 40 years to complete, and that errors and inaccuracies were creeping into the system due to the overwhelming workload. The EQC proposed legislation in the 2005 session of the legislature which would require the DNRC to examine all water rights claims by June 30, 2015. The Water Court was given until 2020 to issue all final decrees. To support the Water Court, a fee was imposed on all water rights in the state. The money raised by the water rights fee allowed the Water Court to expand the number of water masters to 11 and the number of clerks to six. The water rights fee proved highly contentious, however. The legislature repealed the fee in 2007, but maintained the Water Court's budget by appropriating funds from the state's general revenues. In 2009, a legislative study found that the adjudication process was now anticipated to end until 2028.

To speed up the work of the Water Court, the state legislature approved the creation of an Associate Water Judge in 2011. The Chief Water Judge retained the administrative duties and assigned cases to the Associate Water Judge, but in most other respects the two were co-judges of the Water Court. Russ McElyea, a private adjudicator and real estate attorney, was nominated to be the Associate Water Judge in May 2012. (Note: Judge McElyea was a private adjudicator and attorney for about 17 years. He became the general counsel and then chief executive officer of Moonlight Basin, a ski resort near Big Sky, Montana.) His four-year term in office began on July 1.

As the DNRC moved more swiftly on examining water rights claims, it had less work to do. However, Chief Water Judge Loble advised the legislature that roughly 90,000 water claims adjudicated in the early 1980s needed to be re-adjudicated. The Water Court recognized that its early work had not been standardized, and potentially could create extensive litigation once revised preliminary decrees were issued. To assist the Water Court in meeting these needs, the 2013 legislature approved legislation to shift funds and personnel from the DNRC to the Water Court.

Chief Judge Loble retired in July 2013. Loble reviewed more than 1,700 water rights claims a year during his tenure as Chief Water Judge, and reviewed and approved nine compacts between the State of Montana and various Native American tribes. Nevertheless, more than 15,000 water rights claims remained unreviewed by the Water Court. Upon his retirement, Loble famously noted "water is a flammable substance" in Montana.

=== Judge McElyea tenure ===
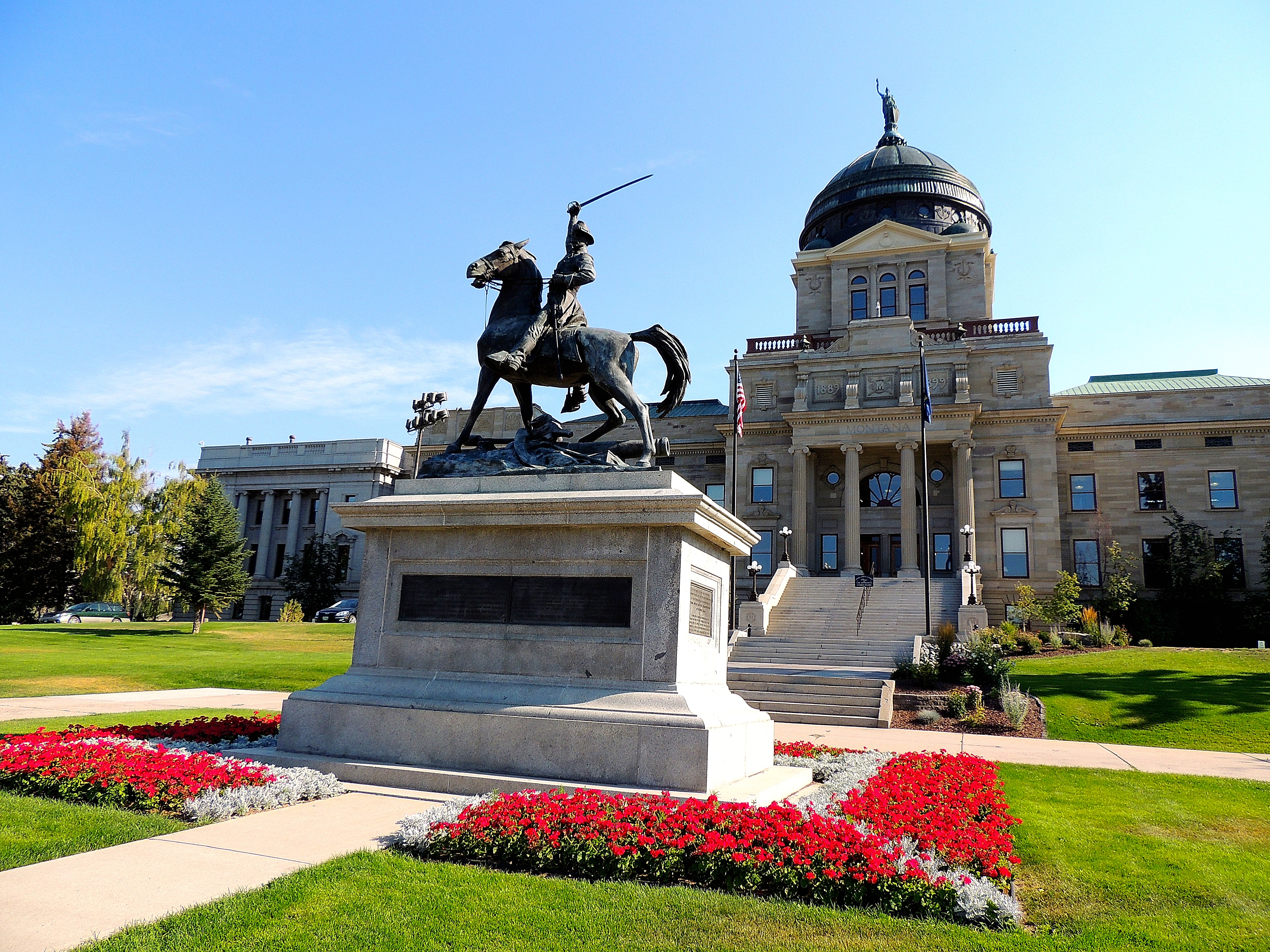
To keep the Water Court on good legal ground, the Montana Legislature (State Capitol depicted) codified into law the Water Court's water rights re-examination rules in 2015.

McElyea was appointed Chief Water Judge in May 2013 effective upon Loble's retirement. Douglas Ritter was appointed Associate Water Judge on September 13, 2013, to fill McElyea's unexpired term. (Note: Judge Ritter had been a water master with the Water Court since 1992, and by 2013 was the Senior Water Master.)

In early 2015, the DNRC finished verifying and examining the more than 219,000 water rights claims in Montana. Chief Water Judge McElyea asked the state legislature for assistance in the Water Court's review of the 90,000 early decisions. To help ensure that the Water Court was on firm legal ground for this review, McElyea asked the legislature to adopt the Water Court's reexamination benchmarks into law. The legislature did so, and increased funding for Water Court as well.

In 2017, the Montana Legislature began consideration of a bill which would alter the MWUA. Under current law, anyone who objects to a DNRC decision regarding new water rights (those filed after 1982) must seek redress in a Montana District Court. But District Court judges expressed concern over this provision, because they lacked experience with water rights. The proposed bill would change the venue for this lawsuit to the Water Court. Only four or five cases a year were expected to come before the court.

=== Termination ===
The 1979 MWUA amendments contained no provision for terminating the Water Court once it accomplished its task of adjudicating all water rights. Theoretically, the Water Court could run out of work once its task was completed. However, in 1985 the Montana Legislature enacted a bill which gave the Water Court jurisdiction over water allocation decisions by the DNRC. Several studies project that all final adjudications would have been reviewed by the Montana Supreme Court by 2028. This would leave the Water Court with little work.

== Case law ==
In 1979, the U.S. government revived the several federal lawsuits in Montana seeking to protect the water rights claims of the Native American tribes in the state. These went before the Ninth Circuit Court of Appeals in 1982, which held in Northern Cheyenne Tribe v. Adsit, 668 F.2d 1080 (9th Cir. 1982)., San Carlos Apache Tribe v. Arizona, 668 F.2d 1093 (9th Cir. 1982)., and Navajo Nation V. United States, 668 F.2d 1100 (9th Cir. 1982). that state courts could not adjudicate Native American water claims. The cases were consolidated by the U.S. Supreme Court, which overturned the Ninth Circuit in Arizona v. San Carlos Apache Tribe, 463 U.S. 545 (Sup.Ct. 1983). Many legal experts had assumed that federal courts would favor federal (e.g., Native American) interests and state courts would favor state (e.g., local) interests. Depending on where a case was filed would largely determine the outcome, and they expected the Supreme Court to follow this reasoning by following a "first to the courthouse". But the Supreme Court declined to do so. Instead, it ruled that the more comprehensive state processes for adjudicating water rights should be allowed to proceed. Federal lawsuits should be not be entertained by the federal district courts until the state water adjudication process has run its course. The ruling in San Carlos Apache Tribe effectively brought Native American water rights claims under the MWUA.

San Carlos Apache Tribe left the Montana Supreme Court to determine whether the Constitution of Montana and the MWUA gave the Water Court the authority to adjudicate Native American water rights. In State ex rel. Greely v. Water Court, 691 P.2d 833 (Mont. 1984). and State ex rel. Greely v. The Confederated Salish and Kootenai Tribes, 712 P.2d 754 (Mont. 1984)., the Montana Supreme Court held that the 1972 constitution did not bar state adjudication of Native American water rights, and that the MWUA provided similar authority to the Water Court.

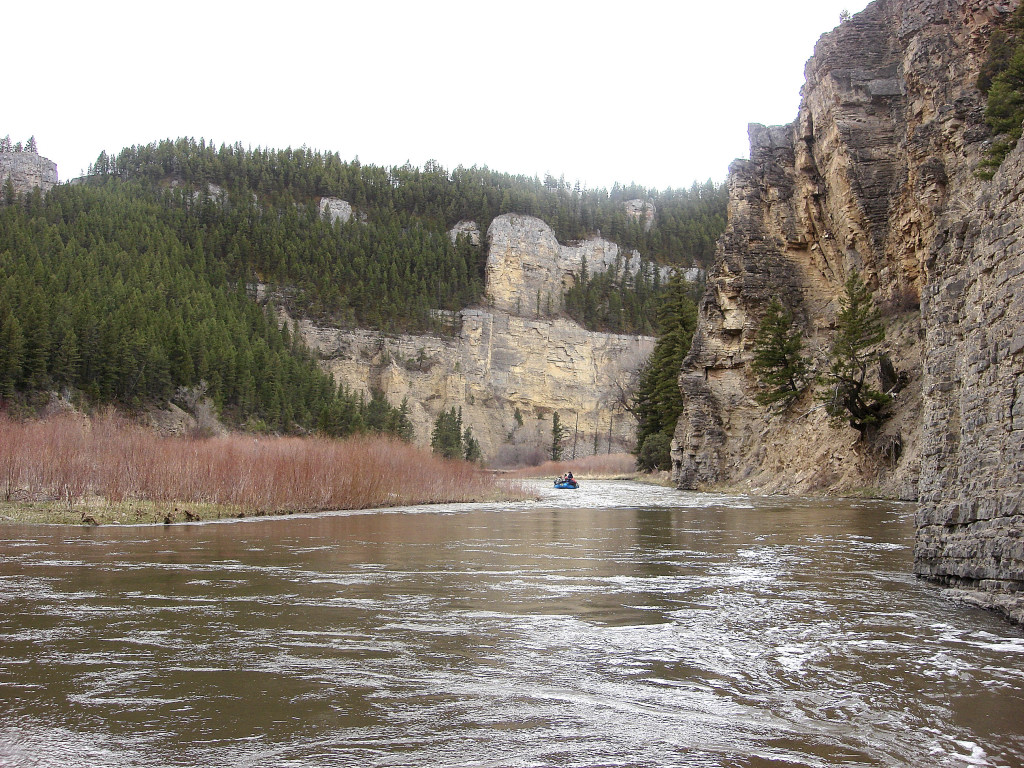
Decisions of the Montana Supreme Court and the enactment of the Montana Stream Access Law have given recreational users, such as these rafters on the Smith River, a stake in water rights cases.

As the Montana Supreme Court was deciding the two MWUA cases, it was also wrestling with a new issue: Stream access and recreational use. In Montana Coalition for Stream Access v. Curran, 682 P.2d 163 (Mont. 1984)., the Montana Supreme Court distinguished between navigability-for-title and navigability-for-use. Property owners could take title to stream beds beneath navigable waters. But use of the waters was something different, and could only be vested in the state. In Montana Coalition for Stream Access v. Hildreth, 684 P.2d 1088 (Mont. 1984)., the Montana Supreme Court went even further, It held, first, that capability for use (not actual use) determined navigability-for-use, and, second, that the state's ownership of waters (irrespective of who owned the bed beneath the waters) gave the public access to these waters. In 1985, the year after Curran and Hildreth, the Montana Legislature codified these decisions in the Montana Stream Access Law. The law opened "all surface waters that are capable of recreational use [to] the public without regard to the ownership of the land underlying the waters." Curran, Hildreth, and the Stream Access law created a new class of user (the public) who had a vested interest in seeing that navigable waters were protected so they could be used for things such as boating, fishing, floating, hunting, swimming, and other water-related pleasure activities. The tension between water rights claimants and recreational users has remained a contentious one ever since, with numerous lawsuits before the Montana Supreme Court.

Curran and Hildreth led to another significant Montana Supreme Court ruling regarding Water Court decisions as well. Montana Trout Unlimited (MTU), a fishing advocacy and conservation group, applied to the Water Court to object to certain preliminary water rights rulings on behalf of recreational users. The Water Court refused to give MTU permission to file its objections. MTU took the case to the Montana Supreme Court, which in 2011 overruled the Water Court and held in Montana Trout Unlimited v. Beaverhead Water Company, 255 P.3d 179 (Mont. 2011). that there "is no statutory or regulatory restriction on who is entitled to file an objection to a claim of a water right." Initially, the effect of Montana Trout Unlimited v. Beaverhead Water Co. was expected to unleash a wave of objections to water rights claims. But four years later, a state legislative study found that far fewer objections had been filed than expected. Although the adjudication process had been slowed, it was not overwhelmed.

In 2013 and 2014, the Montana Supreme Court issued a series of rulings in which it established the standard of review for Water Court rulings. The state high court held that Water Court rulings should be reviewed using the same "clearly erroneous" standard which the Montana Supreme Court uses to review Montana District Court decisions.

In 2017, the Montana Supreme Court considered a case in which non-Native federal reserved water rights conflicted with state water claims. In this case, the federal Bureau of Land Management (BLM) owned five reservoirs and a lake on federal land. BLM did not, however, use the water. Ranchers in the area asked the Water Court to disallow BLM's water rights claims, and to give them the water. The ranchers claimed that the MWUA required actual use of water, not just its diversion or retention. The Water Court declined to overturn BLM's water rights. In In re Barthelmess Ranch Corp., 2016 MT 348 (Mont. 2017)., the Montana Supreme Court agreed with the Water Court. Although the reservoirs had been constructed for the benefit of ranchers holding grazing leases on BLM land, BLM was not obligated to actually distribute the water in order to retain its water claims.

== Tribal and federal compacts ==
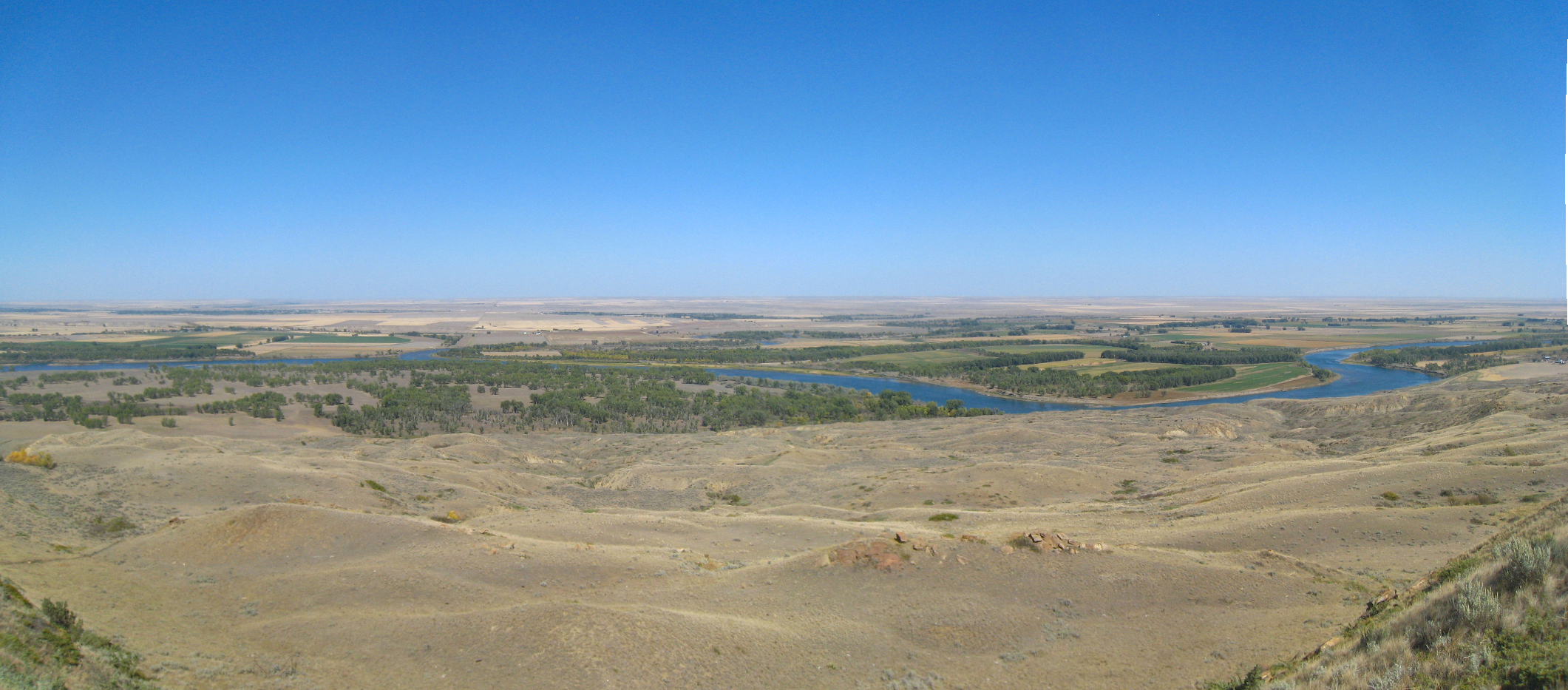
The Missouri River, as it forms the southern border of the Fort Peck Indian Reservation. The Assiniboine (Nakota) and Sioux (Dakota) tribes were among the first to sign a water rights compact with the state of Montana.

Because the state of Montana is not engaged in a full inter se adjudication of water rights, the federal government does not have to relinquish its water rights in Montana under the McCarran Act. The MWUA established the Montana Reserved Water Rights Compact Commission to negotiate a series of compacts with federal agencies and Native American tribes to essentially adjudicate federal claims.

Tribal compacts include:

- Assiniboine (Nakota) and Sioux (Dakota) Tribes of the Fort Peck Indian Reservation—Signed in 1985, this compact governs the Missouri River and its tributaries flowing through the Fort Peck Indian Reservation. It was ratified by the Montana Legislature, in 1985, the United States Department of the Interior, the United States Department of Justice in 1985. The Montana Water Court issued a final decree governing this compact in August 2001.
- Blackfeet Tribe (Piikáni) of the Blackfeet Indian Reservation—Signed in 2009, this compact governs Birch Creek and the Milk River. It was approved by Congress and signed into law by President Barack Obama on December 16, 2016.
- Chippewa (Ojibwe) Cree (Nehiyaw) Tribe of the Rocky Boy Indian Reservation—Signed in 1977, this compact covers all water on the Rocky Boy Indian Reservation. It was ratified by the Montana Legislature in 1997, and by Congress in 1999. The Montana Water Court issued a final decree governing this compact in May 2002.
- Confederated Salish and Kootenai (Ktunaxa and Kalispel) Tribes of the Flathead Indian Reservation—Signed in 2013, the compact governs all water on the Flathead Indian Reservation as well as tribal water claims outside the reservation. It failed to pass the state legislature, and was revised by all the parties in 2014. It was approved by the Montana Legislature in 2015. It was signed by outgoing-U.S. president Donald Trump on December 29, 2020, and CSKT's Tribal Council approved the Compact and ordinance December 29, 2020. Secretary of the Interior Deb Haaland enacted the Compact September 17, 2021.
- Crow (Apsáalooke) Tribe—Signed in 1999, this compact governs all water on the Crow Indian Reservation. It was approved by the Montana Legislature in 1999, by Congress in November 2010, and by the Crow Tribe in March 2011. A preliminary decree was issued by the Montana Water Court in January 2013, and a final decree in May 2015.
- Gros Ventre Haaninin and Assiniboine (Nakota) Tribes of the Fort Belknap Indian Reservation—Signed in 2001, this compact governs all water on the Fort Belknap Indian Reservation. It was approved by the Montana Legislature in 2001. Although legislation was submitted in 2011, the compact still awaits approval by Congress.
- Northern Cheyenne (Tsehéstáno) Tribe of the Northern Cheyenne Indian Reservation—Signed in 1991, this compact covers all water on the Northern Cheyenne Indian Reservation, as well as Rosebud Creek and the Tongue River and their tributaries. It was approved by the Montana Legislature in 1991, and by Congress in September 1992. The Montana Water Court issued a final decree governing this compact in September 1995.

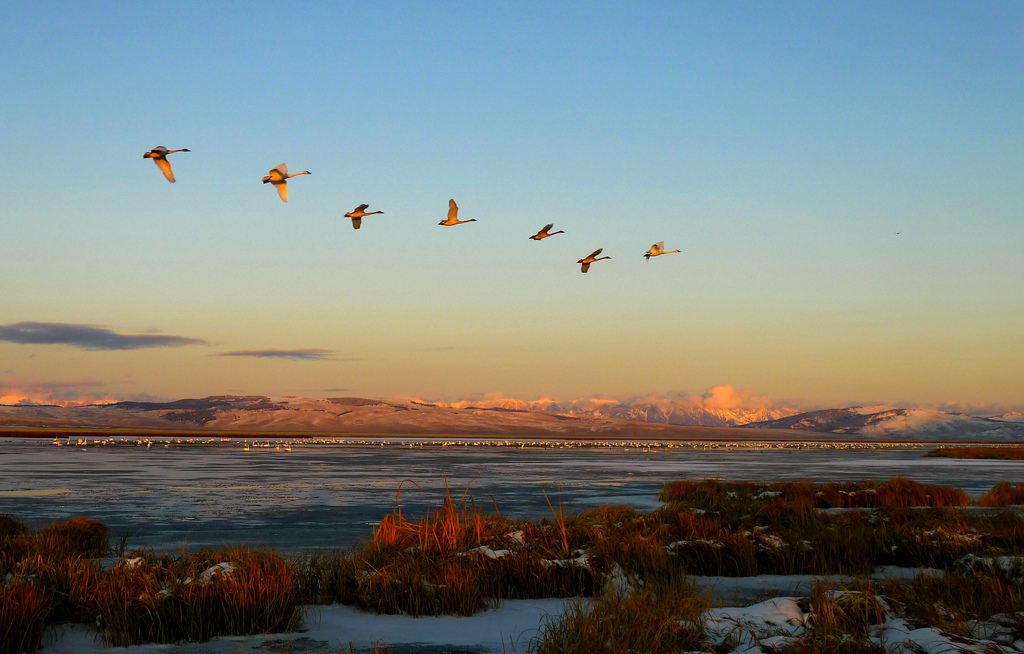
Red Rock Lakes National Wildlife Refuge was covered in a compact between the State of Montana and the U.S. federal government in 1999.

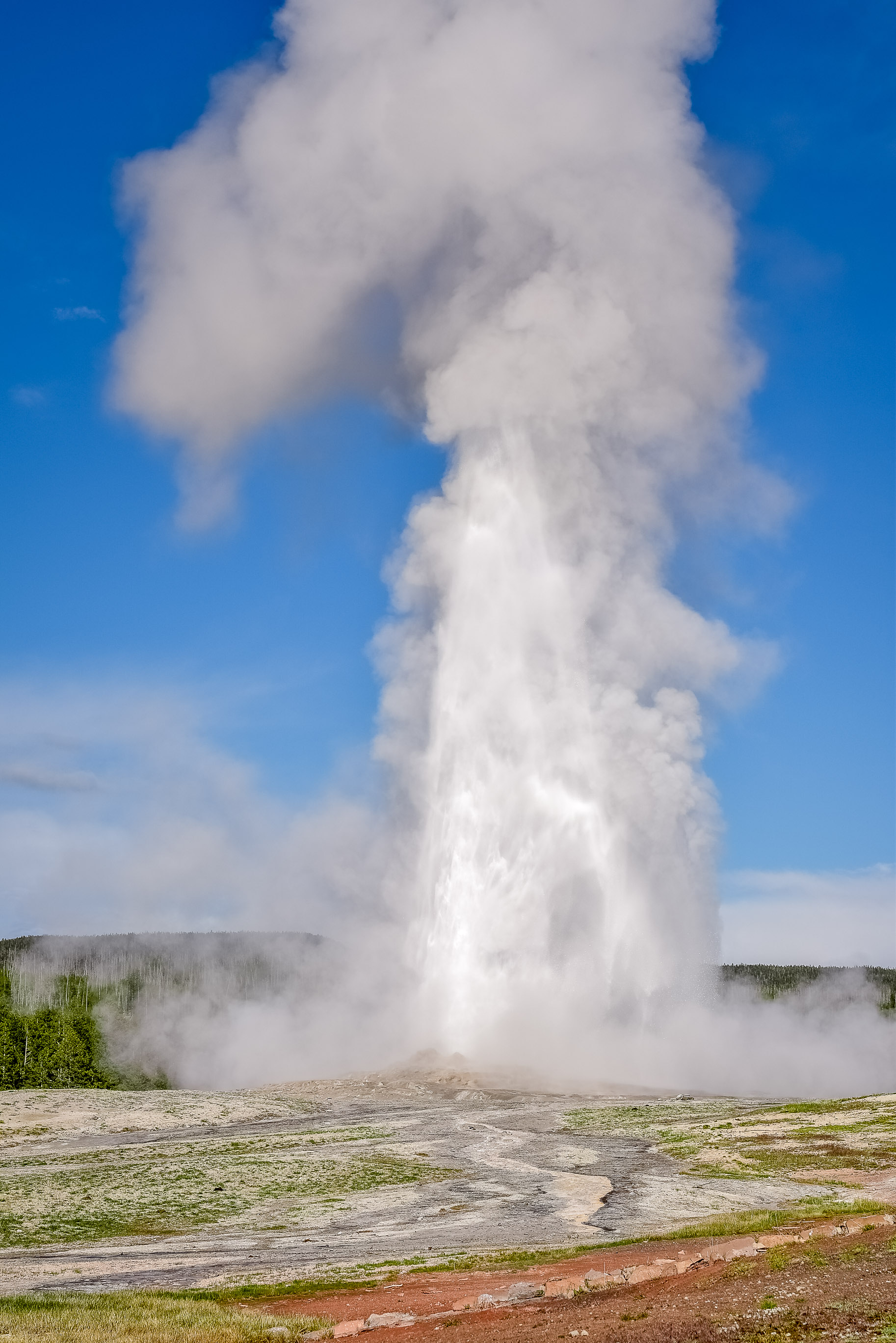
The hydrothermal features in Yellowstone National Park were specifically covered in the water rights compact between the State of Montana and the U.S. federal government, signed in 1993.

Other federal agency compacts include:

- Bear Trap Canyon unit of the Lee Metcalf Wilderness—Signed in 1997, this compact covers all water in the Bear Trap Canyon unit of the Lee Metcalf Wilderness, as well as the Madison River. This compact was ratified by the Montana Legislature and the Department of the Interior in 1997. The Montana Water Court issued a final decree governing this compact in May 2011.
- Benton Lake National Wildlife Refuge—Signed in 1996, this compact covers all water in the Benton Lake National Wildlife Refuge. This compact was ratified by the United States Fish and Wildlife Service and the Montana Legislature in 1997. The Montana Water Court issued a final decree governing this compact in October 2005.
- Big Hole National Battlefield—Signed in 1993, this compact covers all water on the Big Hole National Battlefield. This compact was ratified by the National Park Service and the Montana Legislature in 1993. The Montana Water Court issued a final decree governing this compact in April 2005.
- Bighorn Canyon National Recreation Area—Signed in 1993, this compact covers all water in the Bighorn Canyon National Recreation Area. This compact was ratified by the National Park Service in 1993 and the Montana Legislature in 1995. The Montana Water Court issued a final decree governing this compact in April 2005.
- Black Coulee National Wildlife Refuge—Signed in 1996, this compact covers all water in the Black Coulee National Wildlife Refuge. This compact was ratified by the U.S. Fish and Wildlife Service and the Montana Legislature in 1997. The Montana Water Court issued a final decree governing this compact in October 2005.
- Bowdoin National Wildlife Refuge—Signed in April 2013, this compact governs all water rights in the Bowdoin National Wildlife Refuge. The United States Forest Service and United States Fish and Wildlife Service approved the compact in March 2014, a preliminary decree was issued by the Montana Water Court in October 2015, and a final decree was issued by the Montana Water Court in May 2016.
- Charles M. Russell National Wildlife Refuge—Signed May 11, 2015, this compact governs 69 streams flowing into the Charles M. Russell National Wildlife Refuge. This compact was ratified by the Montana legislature in 2013. The United States Department of the Interior and the United States Department of Justice signed the compact on May 11, 2015. As of January 2017, the compact was awaiting approval by the Montana Water Court.
- Fort Keogh Livestock and Range Research Station—Signed in 2006, this compact covers all water at the Fort Keogh Livestock and Range Research Station. This compact was ratified by the Montana Legislature in 2007, and by the United States Department of Agriculture in 2013. The Montana Water Court issued a preliminary decree governing this compact in June 2015, and a final decree in April 2016.
- Glacier National Park—Signed in 1993, this compact covers all water in Glacier National Park. This compact was ratified by the National Park Service and the Montana Legislature in 1993. The Montana Water Court issued a final decree governing this compact in April 2005.
- Little Bighorn Battlefield National Monument—Signed in 1993, this compact covers all water on the Little Bighorn National Battlefield. This compact was ratified by the National Park Service in 1993 and the Montana Legislature in 1995. The Montana Water Court issued a final decree governing this compact in April 2005.
- National Bison Range—Signed in 2009, this compact governs all water rights in the National Bison Range. This compact was ratified by the Montana Legislature and U.S. Fish and Wildlife Service in 2009. A preliminary decree was issued by the Montana Water Court in September 2011, and a final decree was issued in July 2014.
- Red Rock Lakes National Wildlife Refuge—Signed in 1999, this compact covers all water in the Red Rock Lakes National Wildlife Refuge. This compact was ratified by the Montana Legislature in 1999, and by the Department of Justice and the Department of the Interior in February 2000. The Montana Water Court issued a final decree governing this compact in August 2005.
- Upper Missouri River Breaks National Monument—Signed in 2012, this compact covers all water in the Upper Missouri River Breaks National Monument, as well as Arrow Creek and the Judith River. This compact was ratified by the Montana Legislature in 2013, and by the Department of Justice and the Department of the Interior in 2015. The Montana Water Court issued a preliminary decree governing this compact in 2015, and a final decree in April 2016.
- Upper Missouri Wild and Scenic River—Signed in 1997, this compact covers all water in the Upper Missouri Wild and Scenic River, as well as the Madison River. This compact was ratified by the Montana Legislature and the Department of the Interior in 1997. The Montana Water Court issued a final decree governing this compact in May 2011.
- South Fork Flathead Wild and Scenic River—Signed in 2006, this compact covers all water for the South Fork Flathead Wild and Scenic River. This compact was ratified by the Montana Legislature and the Department of the Interior in 2007. The Montana Water Court issued a final decree governing this compact in October 2012.
- U.S. Sheep Experiment Station—Signed in 2006, this compact covers all water at the U.S. Sheep Experiment Station's lands in Montana. This compact was ratified by the Montana Legislature in 2007, and by the Department of Agriculture in 2013. The Montana Water Court issued a final decree governing this compact in May 2015.
- Yellowstone National Park—Signed in 1993, this compact covers all water in Yellowstone National Park. It contains specific language to protect the resources and hydrothermal features in Yellowstone. This compact was ratified by the National Park Service and the Montana Legislature in 1993. The Montana Water Court issued a final decree governing this compact in April 2005.

== Chief Judges of the Montana Water Court ==
- William Wallace Lessley—1979 to 1990 (his death)
- C. Bruce Loble—1990 to July 2013
- Ross McElyea—July 2013 to present

Douglas Ritter has held the title of Associate Water Judge since 2013 when Judge McElyea became the Chief Water Judge.

== See also ==
- Courts of Montana

== Bibliography ==
- Carter, John B. (Summer 2003). "Indian Aboriginal and Reserved Water Rights, an Opportunity Lost". Montana Law Review: 377–383.
- Damweber, Nathan (September 2013). "PPL Montana v. Montana: From Settlers to Settled Expectations". Ecology Law Quarterly: 163–194.
- Doney, Ted J.; Loble, C. Bruce (2010). Basic Montana Water Law (PDF) (Report). Helena, Mont.
- Elison, Larry M.; Snyder, Fritz (2001). The Montana State Constitution: A Reference Guide. Westport, Conn.: Greenwood Press. ISBN 9780313273469.
- Goldsby, Albert W. (February 2011). "The McCarran Amendment and Groundwater: Why Washington State Should Require Inclusion of Groundwater in General Stream Adjudications Involving Federal Reserved Water Rights" (PDF). Washington Law Review: 185–216.
- Hedden-Nicely, Dylan R. (Winter 2016). "The Legislative History of the McCarran Amendment: An Effort to Determine Whether Congress Intended for State Court Jurisdiction to Extend to Indian Reserved Water Rights". Environmental Law Review: 845–892.
- Lambert, Kathryn L.W. (Winter 1991). "The Honorable William Wallace Lessley". Montana Law Review: 5–7.
- Legislative Environmental Policy Office (August 18, 2015). A Short History of the Water Court (PDF) (Report). Helena, Mont.
- MacIntyre, Donald Duncan (Summer 1988). "The Adjudication of Montana's Waters—A Blueprint for Improving the Judicial Structure". Montana Law Review: 211–265.
- Schmidt, Deborah Beaumont; Thompson, Robert J. (Summer 1990). "The Montana Constitution and the Right to a Clean and Healthful Environment". Montana Law Review: 411–438.
- State Bar of Montana (January 14, 2010). The Montana Citizen's Guide to the Courts (PDF) (Report). Helena, Mont.: Montana Supreme Court.
- Stone, Albert W. (Fall 1957). "Are There any Adjudicated Streams in Montana?". Montana Law Review: 19–31.
- Stone, Albert W. (Winter 1973). "Montana Water Rights—A New Opportunity". Montana Law Review: 58–74.
- Till, Dustin Trowbridge (Summer 2005). "The Right to Float on By: Why the Washington Legislature Should Expand Recreational Access to Washington's Rivers and Streams". Seattle University Law Review: 1093–1120.
