= Armells, Montana =

Ghost town in Montana, USA

Coordinates: 47°18′56″N 109°11′03″W

Armells is a ghost town in Fergus County, in the U.S. state of Montana.

== History ==
A post office called Armells was established in 1890, and remained in operation until it was discontinued in 1937. The community took its name from nearby Armells Creek.
