= Indian Education for All =

In 1972 the Montana state legislature adopted a new constitution, only its second since it became the 41st state in 1889. Article X, Section 1(2) of the Montana Constitution:

The state recognizes the distinct and unique cultural heritage of American Indians and is committed in its educational goals to the preservation of their cultural integrity.

In 1999, MONTANA passed State Law MCA 20-1-501, known as Indian Education for All (IEFA) and its intent was to implement the prior constitutional requirement.

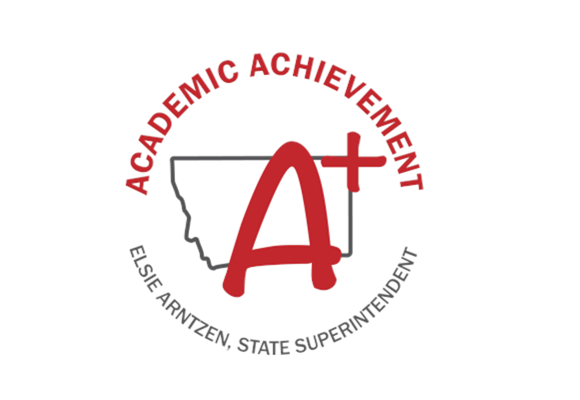
Logo of Indian Education For All, Montana State

== History ==
The one hundred delegates of the Montana constitutional convention enshrined in the newly drafted constitution for the state the principle that educational institutions in the state should commit to presenting their students with a curriculum that would expand and fortify students' understanding of American Indian history, both within and without the state of Montana.

Nearly three decades later in 1999, this principle found in the revised constitution was embodied in House Bill 528 (MCA 20-1-501), successfully passed into law, which is principally referred to as Indian Education for All (IEFA). This Bill states as its intention that Montana state will recognize the distinct and unique cultural heritage of American Indians, and endeavor to preserve that heritage through its educational institutions; this as a law in accordance with, and fulfillment of, Article X of the constitution.

This Bill furthermore presents a threefold purpose: firstly, that every Montanan, without regard to their cultural antecedents, be encouraged to increase their knowledge and understanding of American Indian culture and history; secondly, that Montanan education agencies and personnel work cooperatively with Montanan tribes when providing instruction with regard to the culture, history, and former and contemporary contributions of American Indians, with an especial emphasis on Indian tribal groups and sovereign governments within the state of Montana; thirdly, that school personnel themselves be provided with such means as would enable them to be educated in regard to American Indian culture, past and present, in such a manner that they will be better able to relate to Indian students and their parents.

== Aims and implementation ==
In the succeeding six years after IEFA had been passed into law, it remained a mandate without allocated funds for its implementation. However, in 2005, as part of a special legislative session, the Legislature appropriated funds for its implementation, including support for staff of the Office of Public Instruction, curriculum materials, direct funding to school districts, and grants for schools. Resources from the Office of Public Instruction were additionally allocated to higher education, for the training of teachers and college and university staff and faculties. This provided more than three million dollars to the Office of Public Instruction as beginning funding to implement IEFA, and appropriated a sum exceeding seven million dollars to local districts in order to assist them in their efforts to implement the law.

The primary goal of IFEA was, and remains, to strengthen the understanding and awareness of Montana State citizens of American Indian culture and history, with the intention that this would have a far-reaching social impact that would encompass such things as preservation of Indian culture, improvement of relations between the differing cultural populations of the state, and an increased knowledge and inclusivity of mindset in the citizenry. Additionally, IFEA exists in order to address the perceived need for an education that does not leave sizable gaps in students' knowledge of the largest minority in Montana State.

Included among the aims of implementation of IEFA is that American Indian children themselves would learn about their own cultural legacy, history, languages and historical personages, which aspects have formerly been neglected in the curricula of Montana State, as an evidence of a wider phenomenon of American education at all levels. For non-Indian students there is the benefit of learning about Montana, the state in which they live.

In the early 2000s, the Montana Office of Public Instruction convened educators from each tribal nation to collaborate with regard to the subjects that should be addressed in the curricula of state educational institutions. Together, they explicated the foundation of the implementation of IEFA in the seven Essential Understandings Regarding Montana Indians. All of the efforts of the state of Montana in developing school curricula designed for the implementation of IEFA are based on the understanding expounded in that work.

These seven understandings are as follows: Firstly, there are twelve sovereign tribal nations in Montana, each one of whom possesses a diversity of language, culture, history, and government, in addition to a unique cultural heritage that contributes to contemporary Montana. Tribal sovereignty refers to the inherent right of tribes to self-governance, and their governments provide services similar to those of federal, state, and local governments. Secondly, American Indians, as individuals, are unique and lie on a continuum of identity, from assimilated to traditional. Indian identity is generally recognized through biological ancestry and tribal recognition, though no universal rule exists. For millennia, tribes used indigenous methods to educate their children, but federal assimilation policies, including boarding schools, disrupted this tradition. Students who maintain pride in their culture and language tend to experience school better, and ideally, school curricula will recognize and value students' home cultures. Thirdly, the traditional systems of Indian spirituality persist to the present time, are practiced by American Indians, and are integrated into the manner of their management of affairs. Spirituality for Indigenous peoples generally reflects a worldview where all things are connected, distinct from the concept of religion. While educators do not need to fully understand all aspects of modern American Indian cultures, they must recognize their existence and influence on Native thinking. Fourthly, reservations are lands that have been acquired by Indian tribes for their own use through treaties, statutes, and executive orders. Tribes have actively fought to protect their lands, including through American courts and the Indian Claims Commission. Two key treaties impacted Montana tribal lands: the Fort Laramie Treaties (1851, 1868) and the Hellgate Treaty of 1855. After 1871, Congress ended treaty-making and the federal government employed other methods to reduce Indian land. Fifthly, there have been many federal policies throughout American history which have affected Indian people, and much of American Indian history can be understood from these phases. Early on, Congress held significant authority over Native Americans, enacting over 400 treaties and statutes, making them the most regulated population in the U.S. Understanding key legislative components offers valuable context for the present-day experiences of Native students. Sixthly, history as told from an Indian perspective often conflicts with the accounts of mainstream historians. Providing students with textbooks, primary source documents, and oral traditions, will develop a more objective understanding of history. Seventhly, Indian tribes, under the legal system of the United States, possess sovereign powers, which are independent of the federal and state governments, the total extent of which, however, differs for each tribe. Sovereignty is a key element of tribal independence.
