= Courts of Montana =

List of variety of courts in Montana

Courts of Montana refers to courts of law in the U.S. state of Montana. They include:

State courts of Montana

- Montana Supreme Court
  - Montana District Courts (56 courts, 22 judicial districts)
    - Montana Justice Courts
    - Montana City Courts
    - Montana Municipal Courts
  - Montana Youth Courts, Generally assigned to District Court Judges, cases appealed to the Montana Supreme Court.
  - Montana Worker's Compensation Court
  - Montana Water Court
  - Montana Asbestos Claims Court

Federal courts located in Montana

- United States District Court for the District of Montana
- United States Bankruptcy Court for the District of Montana
