= Montana inferior courts =

American courts in Montana with limited state jurisdiction

Inferior courts in Montana, also known as courts of limited jurisdiction, refer to those courts of law, established by the Constitution of Montana or authorized by law, with limited jurisdictions. These courts consist of City Courts, Justice Courts, and Municipal Courts. Inferior courts may be courts of record (in that a transcript of all proceedings is made), or they may not. Appeals from inferior courts are made to Montana District Courts.

== Constitutional authority ==
Montana has had two constitutions in its history, both of which have authorized inferior courts.

The constitution of 1889 explicitly authorized the creation of justice courts (and justices of the peace), police courts (and police magistrates), and municipal courts. None of these courts were courts of record. Justices of the peace were to be elected, but the constitution left it up to the legislature to decide how police magistrates and municipal court judges were to be named. All three courts had very limited jurisdiction. The 1889 constitution also restricted the creation of inferior courts only to state-incorporated cities or towns.

Montana voters approved a new state constitution in 1972. Article VII, Section 1 of this constitution authorized the state legislature to create Justice Courts as well as whatever other inferior courts it deemed necessary. Section 5 specifically required there to be at least one Justice Court and Justice of the Peace in each county, and for justices of the peace to be elected. It also authorized the legislature to give Justice Courts whatever jurisdiction the legislature deemed fit, although the constitution barred Justice Courts from hearing any felony cases except during preliminary hearings. Section 9 allowed the legislature to define the method of selection for non-justice inferior courts, and to establish the qualifications for office for all inferior courts. Section 10 barred any inferior court judge from running for elective office (other than another judicial position), while Section 11 provided for a new statewide Judicial Standards Committee to hear cases of misconduct and recommend sanctions (up to and including removal from the bench) to the Montana Supreme Court.

Trial in all inferior courts may be by judge or by jury, at the discretion of the criminal or civil defendant.

== Justice Court ==
Justice Courts, also known as Justice of the Peace Courts, have jurisdiction over civil suits involving less than $5,000, misdemeanors, misdemeanor charges of driving under the influence, traffic violations, fish and game violations, protective orders, and preliminary hearings. They also act as a small claims court, hearing small claims involving less than $3,000. They generally do not handle cases involving minors, except for cases involving possession of alcohol or tobacco, gambling, fish and game violations, and traffic offenses. Their process covers the county in which they are located. When there is no city or municipal court in a county, the justice court hears cases involving both city and county city ordinances. There is no qualification to be a justice of the peace. The office is elected, and vacancies are filled by the commissioners of the county in which the court is located.

There are 62 justice courts in Montana. Each county has the right to determine if its justice court will be a court of record. Only four counties have done so: Cascade County, Hill County, Flathead County, and Lewis and Clark County. Both Cascade and Flathead county have two justices of the peace, due to the heavy workload in those counties.

Justice Court Judges, under MCA 46-5-220, can sign Search Warrants.

== City Court ==
City Courts generally have the same jurisdiction as Justice Courts, but their jurisdiction extends only to the enforcement of city ordinances. Their process covers the city in which they are located. There is no qualification for office. Each city determines whether the city court judge will be appointed or elected.

There are 81 city courts in Montana. None of them are courts of record.

Similar to Justice Court Judges, City Court Judges can also sign Search Warrants, as per MCA 46-5-220.

== Municipal Court ==
Municipal Courts generally have the same jurisdiction as Justice Courts, but with some important differences. Their jurisdiction does not extend to the enforcement of city ordinances, and they can hear civil suits involving up to $7,000. Unlike Justice or City Courts, Municipal Courts may issue arrest warrants for felony crimes. Their process covers the city in which they are located. Municipal Court judges must be lawyers, and must be elected to office.

There are just five Municipal Courts in Montana, and all of them are courts of record.

Like with City Court Judges and Justice Court Judges, Municipal Court Judges can sign Search Warrants, under the provisions of MCA 46-5-220.

== Appealing the decision of an inferior court ==
Except as otherwise provided for by law, Montana District Courts act as appellate courts for inferior courts, and must hear cases de novo (as if no evidence or testimony had been heard). Justices of the Peace Courts are not "courts of record", which is why District Courts must try "the matter anew, the same as if it had not been heard before and as if no decision had been previously rendered." Appeals from City Courts and Municipal Courts which are defined as "courts of record" are the two exceptions, and such appeals are limited to a review of the record and questions of law.

== Drug courts ==
Drug courts are not actual courts, but rather a separate docket used by some inferior courts. The docket provides specialized attention to misdemeanors, child abuse and child neglect cases, and juvenile cases which involve individuals addicted to drugs or alcohol. Drug courts provide treatment as well as sanctions, with the goal of treating addiction, reducing recidivism, and improving rehabilitation. Drug courts rely heavily on drug and alcohol addiction treatment programs; frequent, mandatory drug testing; reduced sentencing and other incentives to encourage the individual to stay in treatment; and much more regular, much more frequent judicial oversight.

== See also ==
- Courts of Montana

== Bibliography ==
- Elison, Larry M.; Snyder, Fritz (2001). The Montana State Constitution: A Reference Guide. Westport, Conn.: Greenwood Press. ISBN 9780313273469.
- State Bar of Montana (January 14, 2010). The Montana Citizen's Guide to the Courts (PDF) (Report). Helena, Mont.: Montana Supreme Court.
