= Armells Creek (Missouri River tributary) =

Stream in Fergus County, Montana, U.S.

Coordinates: 47°37′22″N 108°40′37″W

Armells Creek (Gros Ventre: ʔɔθééíhɔ́ɔ́ɔ́wuh kɔhʔɔ́wuh, lit. 'medicine lodge creek') is a stream in Fergus County, in the U.S. state of Montana. It is a tributary of the Missouri River.

Armells Creek was named for Augustin Hamell, a fur trader. The extinct town of Armells, Montana was located near the creek.

== See also ==
- List of rivers of Montana
