= American Tradition Partnership, Inc. v. Bullock =

- Supreme Court of the United States

Decided June 25, 2012
- Full case name: American Tradition Partnership, Inc., fka Western Tradition Partnership, Inc., et al. v. Steve Bullock, Attorney General of Montana, et al.
- Docket no.: 11-1179
- Citations: 567 U.S. 516 (more) 132 S. Ct. 2490; 183 L. Ed. 2d 448

Case history
- Prior: Western Tradition Partnership, Inc. v. Attorney General, 2011 MT 328

Court membership
- Chief Justice John Roberts Associate Justices Antonin Scalia · Anthony Kennedy; Clarence Thomas · Ruth Bader Ginsburg; Stephen Breyer · Samuel Alito; Sonia Sotomayor · Elena Kagan

Case opinions
- Per curiam
- Dissent: Breyer, joined by Ginsburg, Sotomayor, Kagan

Laws applied
- U.S. Const. amend. I

Western Tradition Partnership, Inc. v. Attorney General, 2011 MT 328, is a decision by the Montana Supreme Court ruling that the broad free speech protections given to corporations in Citizens United v. FEC do not apply to Montana's campaign finance laws. The United States Supreme Court reversed the Montana Supreme Court's decision in American Tradition Partnership, Inc. v. Bullock, 567, U.S. 516 (2012), in a short, per curiam opinion issued without oral argument. The court wrote only that the legal issue had already been precluded by Citizens United, and this case offered no new arguments and failed to distinguish that prior decision.

== Background ==
In a 1912 ballot initiative, the citizens of Montana passed the Montana Corrupt Practices Act in response to the major influence of corporations on state elections. During the early 20th century, a number of rich "Copper Barons" controlled most of the political process through quid pro quo financial transactions with politicians. In response, the state restricted the amount of money that corporations and individuals could donate to campaigns. American Tradition Partnership (ATP), formerly known as Western Tradition Partnership, had challenged the Montana Corrupt Practices Act of 1912, which prohibited independent expenditures to influence political campaigns by corporations, after the United States Supreme Court's Citizens United ruling. ATP was joined in its suit by Champion Painting and the Montana Shooting Sports Association. In October 2010 District Judge Jeffrey Sherlock ruled that the Montana law is unconstitutional. Ruling Judge Sherlock said he agreed with U.S. District Judge Paul Magnuson, who overturned a similar ban in Minnesota. Magnuson wrote that Citizens United "is unequivocal: The government may not prohibit independent and indirect corporate expenditures on political speech." Montana Attorney General Steve Bullock, a Democrat who had been elected to that office in 2008, argued on behalf of the State of Montana that the Corrupt Practices Act should remain in place.

== Opinion of the Montana Supreme Court ==
In response to a potential U.S. Supreme Court challenge, the majority opinion included a great deal of historical evidence to document the "corrupting influence of campaign contributions on elections." Citizens United focused primarily on the free speech limitations of the Bipartisan Campaign Reform Act, whereas the Montana Supreme Court focused on the historical precedent for allowing campaign finance restrictions. In particular, the Montana Supreme Court called the Supreme Court's declaration that corporations have the same constitutional rights as individual citizens "utter nonsense".

The use of abundant historical precedent allowed the majority to argue that their ruling is consistent with the original intent of the First Amendment.

Additionally, the Montana Supreme Court called Citizens United a "crabbed view of corruption" and argued that prior to Montana's campaign finance laws "the state of Montana and its government were operating under a mere shell of legal authority." The majority criticized Citizens United as being unrealistic about the corrupting influence of unlimited secret money, and the court cited a litany of evidence to prove the direct correlation between independent expenditures and political corruption.

The Montana Supreme Court believed that this ruling does not blatantly contradict Citizens United because the ruling deals with a law that has major differences from the Bipartisan Campaign Reform Act (aka McCain–Feingold Act, the law that Citizens United partially overturned).

=== Dissent ===
James Nelson, who was one of the two dissenters, agreed with the majority opinion and called the reasoning of Citizens United "smoke and mirrors", but he did not believe that the Montana Supreme Court had the authority to contradict the Supreme Court. According to Nelson, when the highest court makes a constitutional ruling, all other courts must follow it.

== U.S. Supreme Court per curiam reversal and implication ==
American Tradition Partnership appealed the Montana Supreme Court decision after the court issued its decision. "If Montana is allowed to flout this court's holdings in Citizens United in such a willful and transparent fashion, respect for the Constitution, the rule of law and this court will be eroded", James Bopp, American Tradition Partnership lawyer, argued. In February 2012, the U.S. Supreme Court stayed the decision pending further review by the high court. Justices Ginsburg and Breyer released a short statement, urging the court to revisit Citizens United and "to consider whether, in light of the huge sums of money currently deployed to buy candidate's allegiance, Citizens United should continue to hold sway." The justices asked the court to pay attention to the empirical evidence of corruption caused by the new unlimited spending, a problem that the majority downplayed in their opinion.

The U.S. Supreme Court reversed the Montana Supreme Court without hearing oral argument in American Tradition Partnership, Inc. v. Bullock, 567 U.S. 516 (2012) by a short, per curiam opinion. The court wrote only that "[t]here can be no serious doubt" that the holding of Citizens United applies to the Montana state law, as per U.S. Const., Art. VI, cl. 2, and that "Montana's arguments in support of the judgment below either were already rejected in Citizens United, or fail to meaningfully distinguish that case." Justice Breyer dissented in an opinion joined by Justices Ginsburg, Sotomayor, and Kagan. He would have reconsidered Citizens United or its applicability to the case at hand but believed that the votes to make such an effort meaningful did not exist.

The court had not summarily reversed any lower court with four strongly dissenting justices with so little analysis since 1968. With its ruling the Supreme Court upheld its Citizens United landmark decision. While the Citizens United decision initially appeared to apply equally to state contests, the Supreme Court ruled in American Tradition Partnership, Inc. v. Bullock that the Citizens United holding does so by applying it to Montana state law. Because the Citizens United decision supersedes state law, the states cannot bar corporate and union political contributions in their own elections.

== See also ==
- James Bopp
