= Constitution of Montana =

American state constitution

The Constitution of the State of Montana is the primary legal document providing for the self-governance of the U.S. state of Montana. It establishes and defines the powers of the three branches of the government of Montana, and the rights of its citizens. Its provisions are sovereign within the state, subject only to the limits imposed by the national laws and constitution of the United States. The current Montana Constitution was adopted in 1972 and is the second enacted in the state's history.

== History ==
The Montana Territory was organized by the United States Congress on May 26, 1864. Two years later, in 1866, Acting Territorial Governor Thomas Francis Meagher presided at Montana's first Constitutional Convention, held in Helena rather than in the territorial capital of Virginia City. The first constitution intended for Montana's statehood was written at this six-day meeting, but was lost on the way to the printer and so was never subject to a vote.

A second constitution was written and ratified in 1884, but due to political reasons, Congress failed to take any action to approve Montana's admission to the Union. That document consequently never attained legal force.

In 1889, Congress passed an enabling act that finally permitted the people of Montana to be admitted to the Union after adopting and ratifying a constitution, and the third constitution for the incipient state was written and ratified later that year. It entered into force on November 8, 1889, when Montana became the 41st state admitted to the Union by the Presidential Proclamation of Benjamin Harrison.

The 1889 Constitution remained in force until 1972, when a new constitutional convention was held. The 1972 Constitution was adopted by the 100 delegates to the Constitutional Convention on March 22, 1972, and was ratified by the citizens of Montana on June 6, 1972, through Referendum No. 68.

Among the Articles which contained new material and embodied a contemporary vision for the State of Montana was Article X, Section 1(2), which was the primary inspiration for the act entitled Indian Education for All.
