= Sam E. Haddon =

American judge (1937–2025)

Sam Ellis Haddon
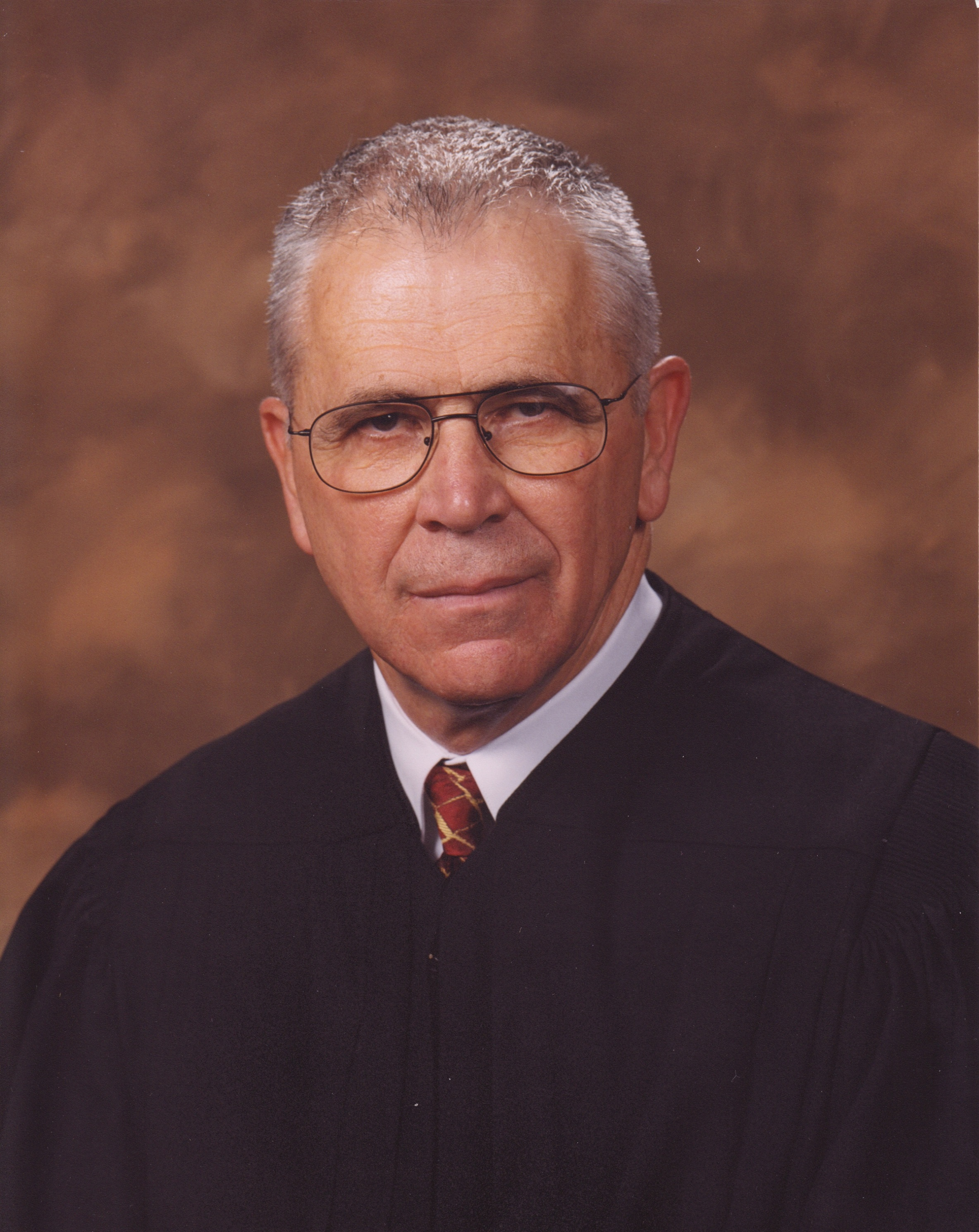

Senior Judge of the United States District Court for the District of Montana
- In office December 31, 2012 – November 26, 2025

Judge of the United States District Court for the District of Montana
- In office July 25, 2001 – December 31, 2012
- Appointed by: George W. Bush
- Preceded by: Charles C. Lovell
- Succeeded by: Brian Morris

Personal details
- Born: June 19, 1937 West Monroe, Louisiana, U.S.
- Died: November 26, 2025 (aged 88)
- Education: Rice University (BS); University of Montana (JD)

Sam Ellis Haddon (June 19, 1937 – November 26, 2025) was an American attorney and jurist who served as a United States federal judge of the United States District Court for the District of Montana. He was an adjunct instructor at the University of Montana School of Law.

== Early life and education ==
Haddon was born in West Monroe, Louisiana, on June 19, 1937. He received a Bachelor of Science from Rice University in 1959 and a Juris Doctor from the University of Montana School of Law in 1965.

== Career ==
Haddon was an Immigration Patrol Inspector, United States Border Patrol from 1959–1961. He was an Agent with the Federal Bureau of Narcotics from 1961–1962.

He began his legal career as a law clerk for William James Jameson. He was in private practice in Montana from 1966–2001 at the law firm of Boone, Karlberg and Haddon. After 1971 he was an adjunct instructor at the University of Montana School of Law.

=== Federal judicial service ===
Haddon, along with Richard F. Cebull, was recommended for the United States District Court for the District of Montana by Montana Senators Max Baucus and Conrad Burns. He would fill the Great Falls seat vacated by Judge Charles C. Lovell. President George W. Bush nominated Haddon on May 17, 2001. Haddon was confirmed by the United States Senate on July 20, 2001, with a unanimous 95-0 vote. He was sworn in on July 25, 2001.

He took senior status on December 31, 2012. Cebull also retired from active service a few months later, leaving Dana L. Christensen the only active judge. Haddon ceased taking cases after August 31, 2023.

== Death ==
Haddon died on November 26, 2025, at the age of 88.

Legal offices
Preceded by Charles C. Lovell	Judge of the United States District Court for the District of Montana; 2001–2012	Succeeded by Brian Morris
