= Sherry Scheel Matteucci =

American attorney

United States Attorney for the District of Montana
- In office November 20, 1993 – April 20, 2001
- President: Bill Clinton; George W. Bush
- Preceded by: Doris Swords Poppler
- Succeeded by: William W. Mercer

Personal details
- Born: August 17, 1947 (age 77); Big Timber, Montana
- Political party: Democratic

Sherry Scheel Matteucci (born August 17, 1947) is an American attorney who served as the United States Attorney for the District of Montana from 1993 to 2001.

== History ==
Matteucci was born in Big Timber, Montana, moving to Bozeman, Montana prior to high school. She obtained her undergraduate degree from Eastern Washington State University. She graduated the University of Montana Law School in 1979.

Matteucci became an associate at the Billings law firm Crowley, Haughey, Hanson, Toole & Dietrich in 1979, then served as a partner from 1985 to 1993. She was the first woman president of the State Bar Association of Montana.

She was appointed as United States Attorney for the District of Montana in November 1993. Most notably, the Montana Freeman were prosecuted by the US Attorney's office during her tenure. During the Freeman standoff, the Unabomber was arrested in Montana. The US Attorney's office in Montana coordinated with California during his prosecution. After stepping down in 2001 she began a private law firm. Her law firm concentrates on mediation and conflict resolution. She also consults for Indian Tribes and organizations, particularly the Crow Tribe.

Matteucci was appointed to the Governor's Council on Homelessness, serving from 2004 to 2006.

== Honors ==
- 2008 Frank I. Haswell Award, State Bar of Montana - for article on the life of Montana’s first female attorney, Ella Knowles Haskell
- 2011 William J. Jameson Award - highest honor from the State Bar Association of Montana
