= Jim Shea (judge) =

American judge (born 1966)

Associate Justice of the Montana Supreme Court
- Incumbent
- Assumed office June 2, 2014
- Appointed by: Steve Bullock
- Preceded by: Brian Morris

Personal details
- Born: James Jeremiah Shea; April 13, 1966 (age 59) Butte, Montana, U.S.
- Spouse: Kathy (m. 1989)
- Children: 2 daughters
- Education: University of Montana (BA, JD)

James Jeremiah Shea (born April 13, 1966) is an American lawyer who serves as an associate justice of the Montana Supreme Court. He was appointed by Governor Steve Bullock in 2014. He previously served as a judge on the Montana Workers' Compensation Court from 2005 to 2014.

== Education and career ==
Shea graduated from the University of Montana School of Law in 1991 and started out as a law clerk for Chief Judge Paul G. Hatfield of the United States District Court for the District of Montana. Shea then worked as a trial attorney with the Metropolitan Public Defender in Portland, Oregon, before returning to Montana to practice mostly civil law.

=== State court service ===
Shea was appointed by Gov. Brian Schweitzer to the Workers' Compensation Court in 2005 and was sworn into that position on September 7, 2005. He was reappointed to a second term in 2011. Prior to his appointment to the bench, he was in private practice, most recently as a partner at the Missoula law firm of Paoli & Shea.

=== Montana Supreme Court ===
In 2014, Governor Steve Bullock appointed Shea to serve on the Montana Supreme Court. Shea replaced Judge Brian Morris, who was confirmed and commissioned as a United States district judge for the United States District Court for the District of Montana in December 2013. Shea's appointment was confirmed by the Montana State Senate by a vote of 41-9. He was sworn in on June 2, 2014. Shea ran unopposed in the 2016 election and was retained with 81.5 percent of the vote.

== Personal life ==
Shea was born and raised in Butte, Montana. He graduated from Butte Central Catholic High School. He and his wife Kathy met in college and married in 1989. They have two daughters, Kate and Moira.

Legal offices
Preceded by Brian Morris	Associate Justice of the Montana Supreme Court; 2014–present	Incumbent
