= Doris Swords Poppler =

Former United States Attorney for the District of Montana

United States Attorney for the District of Montana
- In office 1990 – March 23, 1993
- President: George H. W. Bush; Bill Clinton
- Preceded by: Byron H. Dunbar
- Succeeded by: Sherry Scheel Matteucci

Personal details
- Born: November 10, 1924; Billings, Montana
- Died: December 12, 2004 (aged 80); Billings, Montana
- Political party: Republican

Doris Swords Poppler (November 10, 1924 – December 12, 2004) was an American attorney who served as the United States Attorney for the District of Montana from 1990 to 1993.

== History ==
Poppler obtained her undergraduate education at the University of Minnesota. She served in the US Navy WAVES from 1944 to 1946. Then graduated from the University of Montana School of Law in 1948.

Immediately following school, she practiced law with her father until her marriage. When her husband died, she again began practicing, this time at the Yellowstone County Attorney's Office. Along with co-worker Diane Barz, she later formed the first women's law firm in Montana. In 1980 she became a partner in Davidson, Veeder, Baugh, Broeder, Poppler, and Michelotti, leaving in 1985 to join with Davidson.

In 1984 she ran for the Montana Supreme Court.

In 1990, Poppler was appointed as the US Attorney for the District of Montana. She was the first woman to hold this position. She held that position until 1993. Afterward she served as Senior Field Agent with the National Indian Gaming Commission. Her time with the Billings City Council started in January 2002. She was chosen as deputy mayor.

== Honors ==
Poppler received a lifetime achievement award from the Yellowstone Area Bar Association, again becoming the first woman in an achievement. She was named a distinguished alumni of the University of Montana Law School in 2004.

== Personal life ==
Poppler's father and husband both graduated from the University of Montana School of Law.

She died of cancer on December 12, 2004, in Billings, Montana at age 80.
