= Judge Waters =

Judge Waters may refer to:

- Hugh Franklin Waters (1932–2002), judge of the United States District Court for the Western District of Arkansas
- Laughlin Edward Waters Sr. (1914–2002), judge of the United States District Court for the Central District of California

== See also ==
- Susan P. Watters (born 1958), judge of the United States District Court for the District of Montana
