= Richard F. Cebull =

American judge (born 1944)

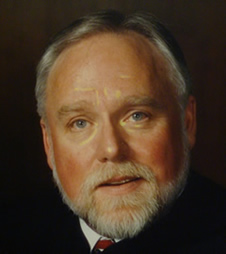

Senior Judge of the United States District Court for the District of Montana
- In office March 18, 2013 – May 3, 2013

Chief Judge of the United States District Court for the District of Montana
- In office 2008–2013
- Preceded by: Donald W. Molloy
- Succeeded by: Dana L. Christensen

Judge of the United States District Court for the District of Montana
- In office July 25, 2001 – March 18, 2013
- Appointed by: George W. Bush
- Preceded by: Jack D. Shanstrom
- Succeeded by: Susan P. Watters

Magistrate Judge of the United States District Court for the District of Montana
- In office 1998–2001

Personal details
- Born: Richard Frank Cebull; March 18, 1944 (age 82) Billings, Montana, U.S.
- Education: Montana State University (BS); University of Montana School of Law (JD)

Richard Frank Cebull (born March 18, 1944) is a former United States district judge of the United States District Court for the District of Montana.

== Early life and career ==
Born in Billings, Montana, and raised in Roundup, Montana, Cebull received his Bachelor of Science from Montana State University (1966) and his Juris Doctor from the University of Montana Law School (1969). He was in private practice in Montana from 1969 to 1997. His focus was on insurance defense and medical malpractice defense. He was also a Trial Judge of the Northern Cheyenne Tribal Court from 1970 to 1972.

== Federal judicial service ==
Cebull served as a United States magistrate judge for the District of Montana from 1998 to 2001. Cebull, along with Sam E. Haddon, was recommended for the United States District Court for the District of Montana by Senators Max Baucus and Conrad Burns. On May 17, 2001, Cebull was nominated by President George W. Bush to a seat on the District Court. The Billings seat was vacated by Jack D. Shanstrom. Cebull was confirmed by the United States Senate on July 20, 2001 with a unanimous vote of 93-0. He received his commission on July 25, 2001. Montana rotates chief judge status between the three active judges; because of this, Cebull became chief judge in 2008.

Cebull took senior status in 2013. Haddon took senior status only a few months earlier, leaving Dana L. Christensen the only active judge.

In a 2002 case brought by natural beef producers, the Charter family, against the United States Department of Agriculture, Cebull upheld the constitutionality of the Beef Promotion and Research Act of 1985, a government-mandated commodity checkoff program for the United States beef industry. The Charter family objected to being forced to pay into the fund, thus associated against their will with political and economic positions taken by the National Cattlemen’s Beef Association, the primary checkoff contractor. Cebull ruled that "The federal government created and controls the beef checkoff program. … Because the government may utilize private speakers to disseminate content-oriented speech, the [Beef] Act does not violate the rights of free speech or association." The ruling was vacated and remanded by the Ninth Circuit in 2005.

In 2004, Cebull granted the Ranchers-Cattlemen Action Legal Fund and the United Stockgrowers of America an injunction against imports of Canadian cattle over concerns of a potential bovine spongiform encephalopathy outbreak. After rulings from the United States Department of Agriculture and protests from the Canadian government, the United States Court of Appeals for the Ninth Circuit reversed Cebull's injunction in July 2005.

== Judicial misconduct and resignation ==
On February 20, 2012, Cebull used his official courthouse email address to forward to seven friends an email containing a racially charged joke about President Barack Obama. In the joke, "A little boy said to his mother; 'Mommy, how come I'm black and you're white?' His mother replied, 'Don't even go there Barack! From what I can remember about that party, you're lucky you don't bark!'" Cebull said he "didn't send it as racist," but rather "sent it out because it's anti-Obama." On March 1, 2012, Cebull initiated a misconduct complaint against himself with the Ninth Circuit and sent a letter of apology to Obama and his family. The Crow Tribal Legislature and a New York Times editorial called for his resignation or impeachment.

On October 4, 2012, United States Courts spokeswoman Karen Redmond said Cebull would take senior status March 18, 2013. Cebull took reduced caseload but still drew a salary and kept a staff. On April 3, 2013, it was announced that Judge Cebull would retire, concluding the misconduct investigation begun by his own self-report. He fully retired on May 3, 2013. An investigation by the Judicial Council of the Ninth U.S. Circuit Court of Appeals revealed that Cebull had sent hundreds of "racist, sexist and politically inflammatory" e-mail messages over four years.

Legal offices
Preceded by Jack D. Shanstrom	Judge of the United States District Court for the District of Montana; 2001–2013	Succeeded by Susan P. Watters
