= R. Lewis Brown =

American judge

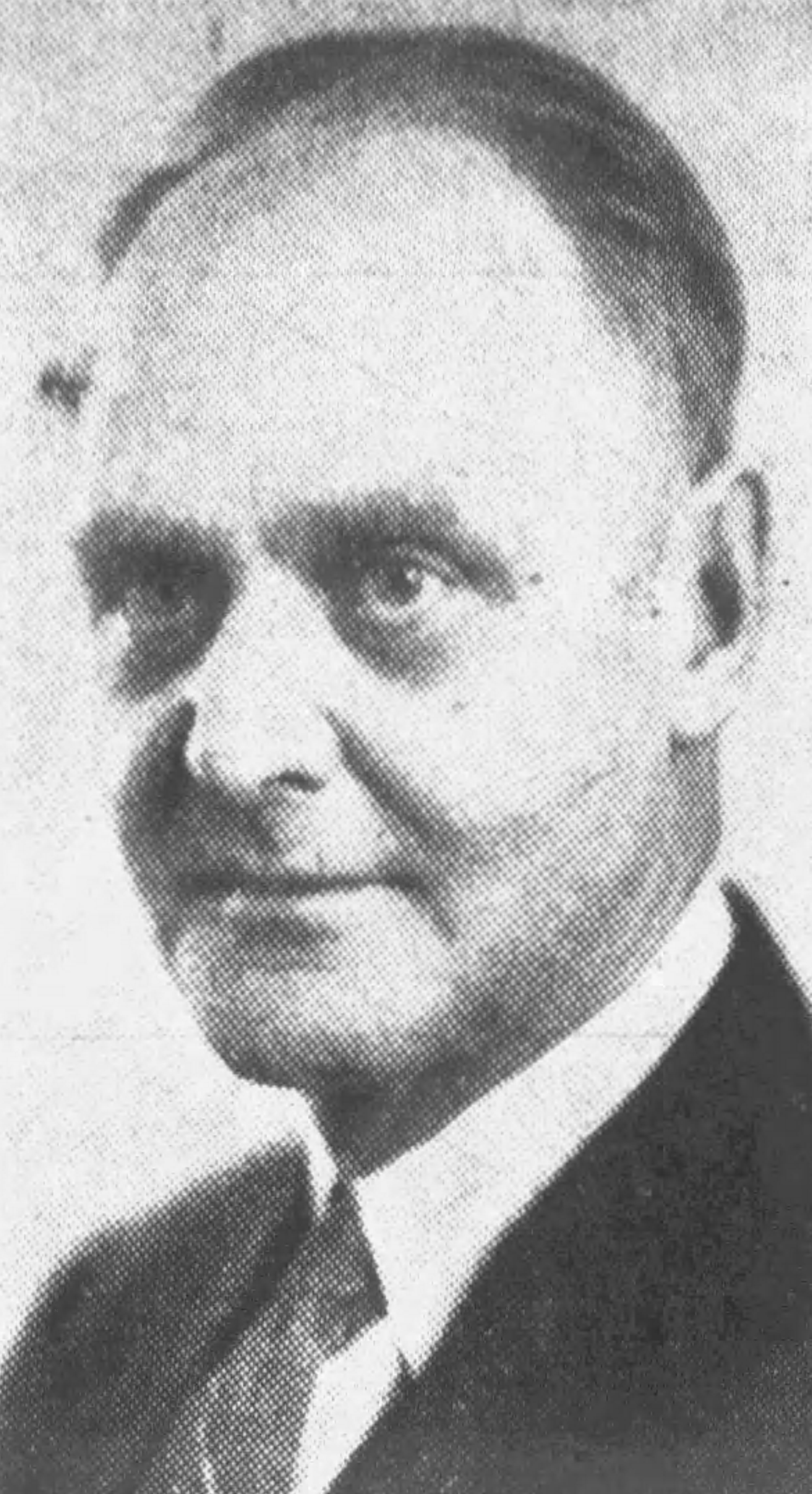

Judge of the United States District Court for the District of Montana
- In office April 7, 1945 – April 2, 1948
- Appointed by: Franklin D. Roosevelt
- Preceded by: James H. Baldwin
- Succeeded by: William Daniel Murray

Personal details
- Born: Robert Lewis Brown; May 25, 1892 Philipsburg, Montana, U.S.
- Died: April 2, 1948 (aged 55)
- Education: Alexander Blewett III School of Law (LL.B.)

Robert Lewis Brown Sr. (May 25, 1892 – April 2, 1948) was a United States district judge of the United States District Court for the District of Montana.

== Education and career ==
Born in Philipsburg, Montana, Brown received a Bachelor of Laws from the Alexander Blewett III School of Law at the University of Montana in 1916. He was county attorney for Granite County, Montana from 1916 to 1918. He was in private practice in Philipsburg from 1918 to 1924. He was a contract miner for the Anaconda Copper Mining Company in Butte, Montana in 1925, returning to private practice in Butte from 1925 to 1945. He was an assistant county attorney of Silver Bow County, Montana from 1932 to 1934, and was then an Assistant United States Attorney of the District of Montana from 1934 to 1945.

== Federal judicial service ==
On March 12, 1945, Brown was nominated by President Franklin D. Roosevelt to a seat on the United States District Court for the District of Montana vacated by Judge James H. Baldwin. He was confirmed by the United States Senate on March 27, 1945, and received his commission on April 7, 1945, serving thereafter until his death on April 2, 1948.

== Sources ==
Legal offices
Preceded by James H. Baldwin	Judge of the United States District Court for the District of Montana; 1945–1948	Succeeded by William Daniel Murray
