= Charles Pray =

Charles Pray may refer to:

- Charles Nelson Pray (1868–1963), Montana politician
- Charles P. Pray (born 1945), Maine politician
