= Donald W. Molloy =

American judge (born 1946)

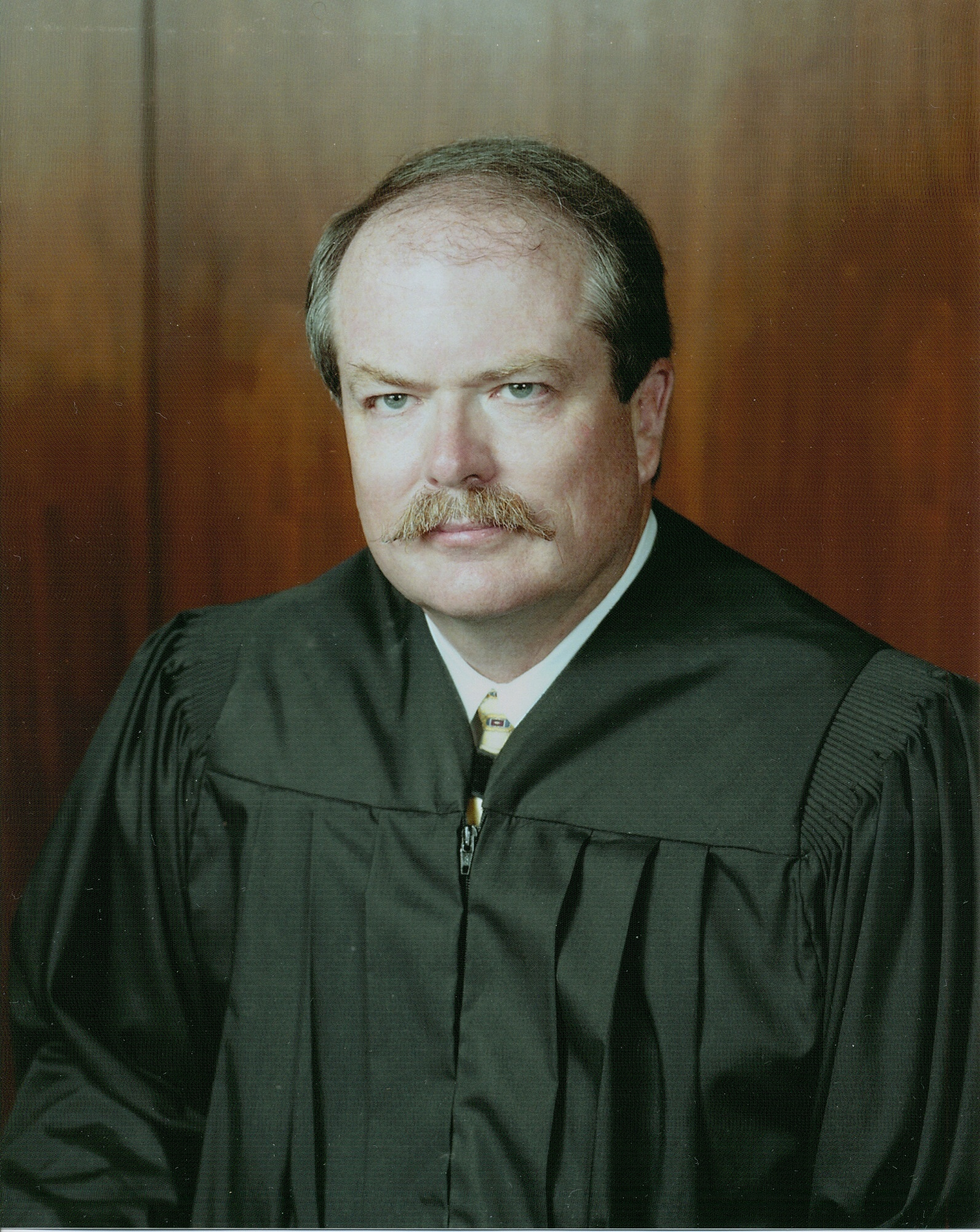

Senior Judge of the United States District Court for the District of Montana
- Incumbent
- Assumed office August 16, 2011

Chief Judge of the United States District Court for the District of Montana
- In office 2001–2008
- Preceded by: Jack D. Shanstrom
- Succeeded by: Richard F. Cebull

Judge of the United States District Court for the District of Montana
- In office August 1, 1996 – August 16, 2011
- Appointed by: Bill Clinton
- Preceded by: Paul G. Hatfield
- Succeeded by: Dana L. Christensen

Personal details
- Born: 1946 (age 79–80) Butte, Montana, U.S.
- Education: University of Montana (BA, JD)

Donald William Molloy (born 1946) is a senior United States district judge of the United States District Court for the District of Montana.

== Early life and education ==
Born into an Irish-American family in Butte, Montana, Molloy received a Bachelor of Arts degree from the University of Montana in 1968. He earned his Juris Doctor from the University of Montana School of Law in 1976, where he was a member of the Law Review. He was in the United States Navy, Naval Aviation from 1968 to 1973, where he became a lieutenant and served on the aircraft carrier USS John F. Kennedy (CVA-67). He was a law clerk to Judge James F. Battin of the United States District Court for the District of Montana from 1976 to 1978. He was in private practice in Billings, Montana from 1978 to 1995, where he was recognized as "one of the ablest lawyers in the state", holding various leadership roles in organizations in the legal community.

The University College Cork conferred an honorary Degree of Doctor of Laws to Molloy in 2013.

=== Federal judicial service ===
When long-serving district judge Paul G. Hatfield announced his intent to take senior status in 1995, numerous Montana attorneys put themselves forward as potential successors on the United States District Court for the District of Montana, including Molloy. Senator Max Baucus recommended Molloy to President Bill Clinton, who nominated Molloy to the seat on December 21, 1995. Molloy was confirmed by the United States Senate on July 18, 1996, and received his commission on August 1, 1996. He served as chief judge from 2001 to 2008, and declared his intent to retire in December 2010, finally assuming senior status on August 16, 2011.

=== Notable rulings ===
==== United States v. W.R. Grace ====
At the time, United States vs. W.R. Grace was the largest and most significant criminal environmental case prosecuted in the United States. The chemical company W.R. Grace produced vermiculite at its Libby, Montana mine. For a time, the mine produced 80% of the mineral worldwide. The mineral contained asbestos which was spread throughout the town. Consequently, residents were exposed to the material and suffered serious health effects. Molloy ordered the company to pay over $54.5 million dollars to the federal government for investigation and cleanup of this Superfund site.

==== Defenders of Wildlife v. Salazar ====
Among Molloy's more noted rulings was a 2011 decision to return wolves in Montana and Idaho to the endangered species list, over the objection of the United States Fish and Wildlife Service. In 2008 the US Fish and Wildlife Service removed a segment of the gray wolf population from the list of threatened and endangered species. Environmental groups challenged the decision. Molloy's ruling was based partly on the decision of the US Congress to retain wolves on the Endangered Species Act. He wrote that the court cannot "exercise its discretion to allow what Congress forbids."

==== Alario v. Knudsen ====
In December 2023 Molloy blocked the state of Montana’s ban on the downloading of TikTok. The ban would have imposed fines on TikTok for each time a user downloads the app within Montana. Montana was the first state to enact a full ban and multiple other states supported the ban and would have followed suit if not for the ruling.

== Sources ==
Legal offices
Preceded by Paul G. Hatfield	Judge of the United States District Court for the District of Montana; 1996–2011	Succeeded by Dana L. Christensen
Preceded by Jack D. Shanstrom	Chief Judge of the United States District Court for the District of Montana; 2001–2008	Succeeded by Richard F. Cebull
