= William J. Jameson Law Library =

Coordinates: 46°51′48″N 113°59′10″W

- Location: Missoula, Montana, U.S.
- Type: Academic library / Law library

Collection
- Specialization: Law

Other information
- Parent organization: Alexander Blewett III School of Law, University of Montana

The William J. Jameson Law Library is the library of the Alexander Blewett III School of Law at the University of Montana in Missoula. It is 20,060 square feet (1,864 m^{2}) in size and is the only academic law library in the state of Montana. The library is named after William James Jameson.
