= Byron H. Dunbar =

American attorney (1927–2007)

United States Attorney for the District of Montana
- In office 1981–1990
- President: Ronald Reagan; George H. W. Bush
- Preceded by: Robert T. O'Leary
- Succeeded by: Doris Swords Poppler

Personal details
- Born: June 8, 1927 Three Forks, Montana
- Died: April 21, 2007 (aged 79) Billings, Montana
- Party: Republican

Byron H. Dunbar (June 8, 1927 – April 21, 2007) was an American attorney who served as the United States Attorney for the District of Montana from 1981 to 1990.

He died on April 21, 2007, in Billings, Montana at age 79.
