= Charles C. Lovell =

American judge (1929–2023)

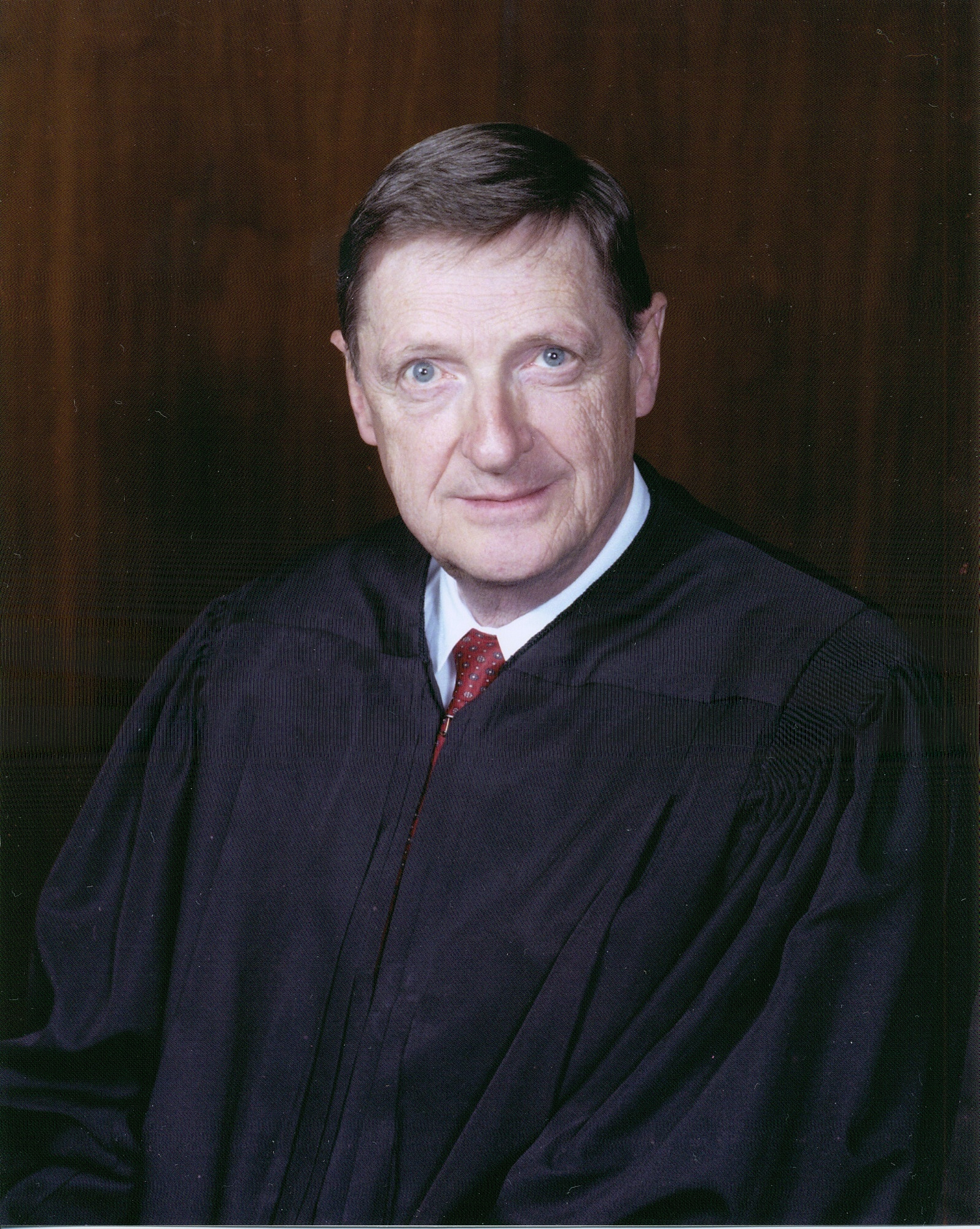

Senior Judge of the United States District Court for the District of Montana
- In office June 14, 2000 – June 14, 2023

Judge of the United States District Court for the District of Montana
- In office April 4, 1985 – June 14, 2000
- Appointed by: Ronald Reagan
- Preceded by: Seat established by 98 Stat. 333
- Succeeded by: Sam E. Haddon

Personal details
- Born: September 10, 1929 Anaconda, Montana, U.S.
- Died: June 14, 2023 (aged 93) Helena, Montana, U.S.
- Education: University of Montana (BS, JD)

Charles Clemens Lovell (September 10, 1929 – June 14, 2023) was a United States district judge of the United States District Court for the District of Montana.

== Biography ==
=== Early life and education ===
Born in Anaconda, Montana, Lovell received a Bachelor of Science degree from the University of Montana in 1952 and was in the United States Air Force from 1952 to 1954, thereafter receiving a Juris Doctor from the University of Montana School of Law in 1959. He was in private practice in Helena, Montana from 1959 to 1985. He was chief counsel to the Office of Montana State Attorney General, Appellate Division from 1969 to 1972.

=== Federal judicial service ===
On March 27, 1985, Lovell was nominated by President Ronald Reagan to a new seat on the United States District Court for the District of Montana created by 98 Stat. 333. He was confirmed by the United States Senate on April 3, 1985, and received his commission on April 4, 1985. He assumed senior status on June 14, 2000. He took inactive senior status on April 7, 2021.

=== Death ===
Lovell died in Helena, Montana on June 14, 2023, at the age of 93.

== Sources ==
Legal offices
Preceded by Seat established by 98 Stat. 333	Judge of the United States District Court for the District of Montana; 1985–2000	Succeeded by Sam E. Haddon
