= 1916 United States Senate election in Montana =

- November 7, 1916
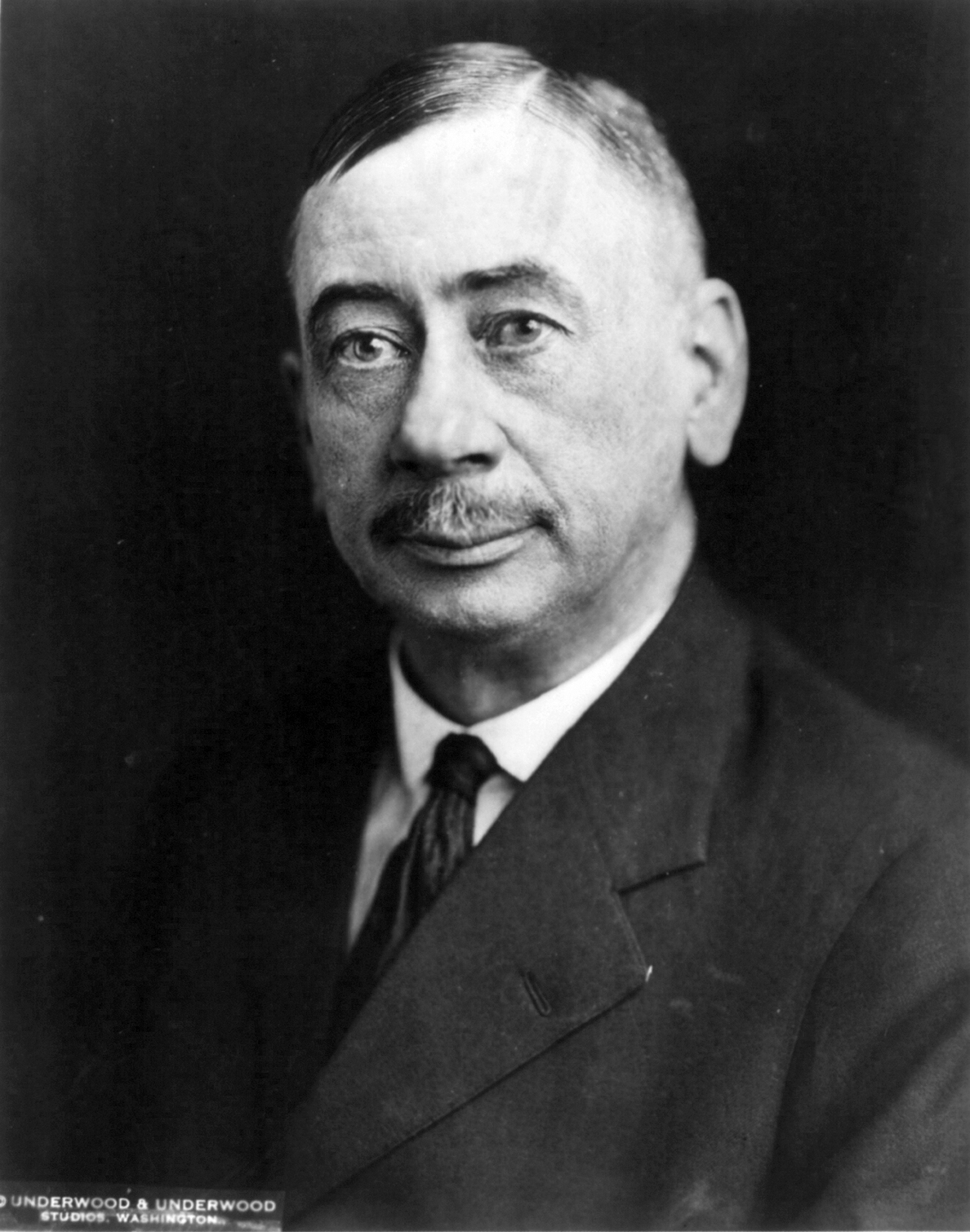

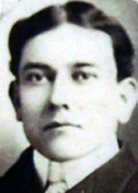

Nominee	Henry L. Myers	Charles N. Pray	Henry La Beau
Party	Democratic	Republican	Socialist
Popular vote	85,585	72,753	9,292
Percentage	51.06%	43.40%	5.54%
- Results by county Myers: 40–50% 50–60% 60–70% Pray: 40–50% 50–60%
U.S. senator before election
Henry L. Myers
Democratic
Elected U.S. Senator
Henry L. Myers
Democratic

The 1916 United States Senate election in Montana took place on November 7, 1916. Incumbent Senator Henry L. Myers was re-elected to a second term in office, defeating Republican Charles N. Pray.

== Republican primary ==
=== Candidates ===
- John E. Edwards
- Charles Nelson Pray, former U.S. Representative

=== Results ===
1916 Republican Primary results
Party	Candidate	Votes	%
Republican	Charles Nelson Pray	29,264	59.74%
Republican	John E. Edwards	19,721	40.26%
Total votes		48,985	100.00%

== General election ==
=== Results ===
1916 United States Senate election in Montana
Party	Candidate	Votes	%
Democratic	Henry L. Myers (incumbent)	85,585	51.06%
Republican	Charles N. Pray	72,753	43.40%
Socialist	Henry La Beau	9,292	5.54%
Total votes		167,630	100.00%
Democratic hold			
