= William W. Mercer =

American politician and judge (born 1964)

Bill Mercer
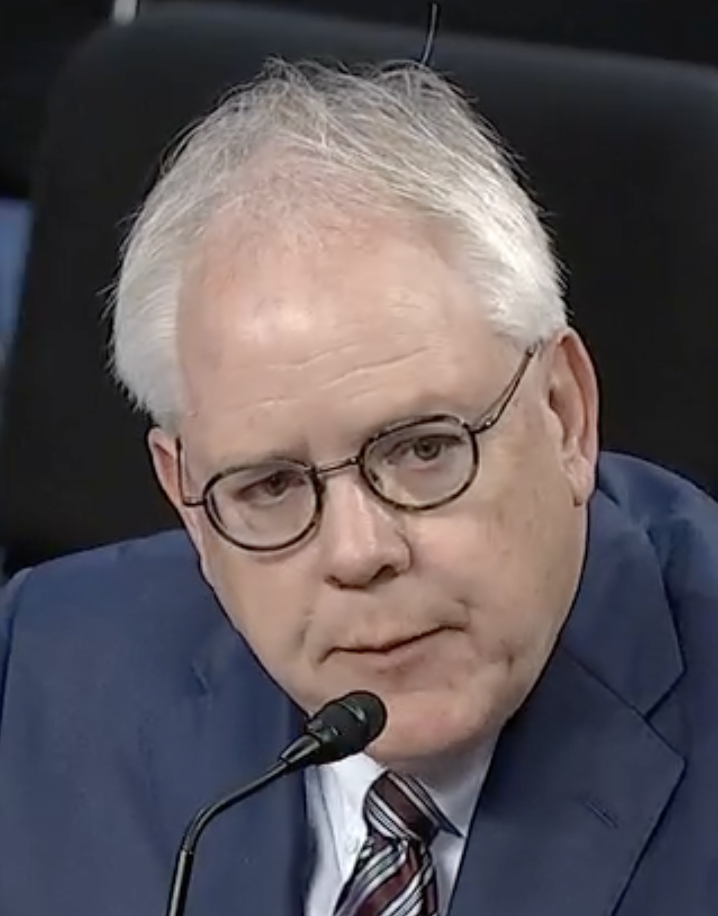

Judge of the United States District Court for the District of Montana
- Incumbent
- Assumed office November 6, 2025
- Appointed by: Donald Trump
- Preceded by: Dana L. Christensen

Acting United States Associate Attorney General
- In office March 17, 2006 – June 22, 2007
- President: George W. Bush
- Preceded by: Robert McCallum Jr.
- Succeeded by: Gregory G. Katsas (acting)

United States Attorney for the District of Montana
- In office April 20, 2001 – December 30, 2009
- President: George W. Bush
- Preceded by: Sherry Scheel Matteucci
- Succeeded by: Michael W. Cotter

Member of the Montana House of Representatives from the 52nd district
- In office January 6, 2025 – November 10, 2025
- Preceded by: Sherry Essmann (redistricting)
- Succeeded by: Stacy Zinn

Member of the Montana House of Representatives from the 46th district
- In office January 7, 2019 – January 6, 2025
- Preceded by: Don Jones
- Succeeded by: Denise Joy (redistricting)

Personal details
- Born: 1964 (age 61–62) Billings, Montana, U.S.
- Party: Republican
- Spouse: Marci Mercer
- Children: 2
- Education: University of Montana (BA); Harvard University (MPA); George Mason University (JD)

William Walter Mercer (born 1964) is an American attorney and politician serving as a United States district judge of the United States District Court for the District of Montana. He served as a member of the Montana House of Representatives from 2019 to 2025. He previously served as the United States attorney for the District of Montana, as well as principal associate deputy attorney general for the United States Department of Justice. Mercer was nominated by President George W. Bush as Associate Attorney General and served in the position in an acting capacity. He resigned before his confirmation hearing could take place.

== Early life and education ==
Mercer was born in Billings, Montana. He received a Bachelor of Arts degree from the University of Montana in 1986, a Master of Public Administration from the John F. Kennedy School of Government at Harvard University in 1988 and a Juris Doctor from George Mason University Law School (now Antonin Scalia Law School) in 1993.

== Career ==
From 1994 to April 2001, Mercer served as an assistant United States attorney for the District of Montana. On April 20, 2001, he was nominated by President George W. Bush to serve as the United States attorney for the District of Montana.

While remaining as the U.S. attorney, Mercer served as principal associate deputy attorney general in the United States Department of Justice from 2005 to 2006. He later served as the acting United States Associate Attorney General starting in 2006, though resigned on June 22, 2007, in light of the 2006 dismissal of U.S. attorneys by the Bush administration.

During his tenure as U.S. attorney, he helped create Project Safe Childhood, a Department of Justice initiative which actively combats technology-facilitated child sexual exploitation and child pornography. The project continues to coordinate with local, state, tribal, and non-governmental agencies and organizations to protect the safety and well-being of American children.

In 2010, Mercer joined the law firm of Holland and Hart as of counsel in Billings and became a partner in 2014. He focused on regulatory law, environmental law, and white collar criminal defense and often represented clients being investigated or prosecuted by government agencies.

== Electoral and legislative history ==
Mercer first announced his candidacy to the Montana House of Representatives in 2018 to succeed fellow Republican Don Jones, who did not seek reelection. He won the 2018 general election with 59.2% of the vote. In 2020, he successfully won his reelection bid, receiving 67.7% of the vote in the general election. He was elected a third term in 2022. He was reelected to a fourth term in 2024 to represent the 52nd district.

In the Montana House of Representatives, Mercer chaired the House Judicial Committee, Law Enforcement and Justice Committee, and served as a member on the House Appropriations Committee.

Mercer resigned from the Montana House on November 10, 2025, after being confirmed as a federal judge.

== Federal judicial service ==
On July 10, 2025, President Donald Trump announced his intention to nominate Mercer to serve as a United States district judge of the United States District Court for the District of Montana, to a seat being vacated by Judge Dana L. Christensen. His nomination was sent to the United States Senate on July 15, 2025. On July 30, 2025, a hearing was held on his nomination by the Senate Judiciary Committee. On September 11, 2025, the Senate Judiciary Committee voted to report his nomination to the full Senate by a 12–10 vote. On October 21, 2025, the U.S. Senate voted to invoke cloture on his nomination by a 53–46 vote. The following day, the Senate voted to confirm his nomination by a 52–45 vote. He received his judicial commission on November 6, 2025.

Legal offices
| Preceded by Dana L. Christensen | Judge of the United States District Court for the District of Montana; 2025–present | Incumbent |
