= Brian Morris (judge) =

American judge (born 1963)

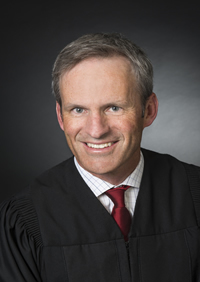
- Official portrait, 2014

Chief Judge of the United States District Court for the District of Montana
- Incumbent
- Assumed office March 19, 2020
- Preceded by: Dana L. Christensen

Judge of the United States District Court for the District of Montana
- Incumbent
- Assumed office December 17, 2013
- Appointed by: Barack Obama
- Preceded by: Sam E. Haddon

Associate Justice of the Montana Supreme Court
- In office January 2, 2005 – December 17, 2013
- Preceded by: Jim Regnier
- Succeeded by: Jim Shea

Personal details
- Born: Brian Matthew Morris; September 5, 1963 (age 63) Butte, Montana, U.S.
- Education: Stanford University (BA, MA, JD)

Brian Matthew Morris (born September 5, 1963) is an American attorney who serves as the chief United States district judge of the United States District Court for the District of Montana. He is a former justice of the Montana Supreme Court, having been elected in 2004. Morris successfully retained his position in the 2012 election. He is also a former fullback for the Stanford Cardinal football team.

== Early life and education ==
Born in Butte, Montana, to John and Joan Morris, Brian Morris graduated from Butte Central Catholic High School, where he was an All-State athlete who competed in football, track, and basketball. As a senior in the 1981–1982 academic year, he led the football team to the 1981 state championship game and set school records by rushing 1,640 yards and making 236 carries for 1,732 total yards. In track, he was the 1982 state champion in both intermediate and high hurdles in the high school's first state championship in track.

Earning a scholarship to Stanford University, Morris was a four-year letterman on the Stanford Cardinal football team and was the team's starting fullback in the 1986 Gator Bowl. In the Gator Bowl, Morris made three carries for 12 rushing yards and made 3 receptions for 6 yards. In his junior and senior years, he was honorable mention all-Pacific-10 Conference and first team all-academic Pac-10. With 12 pass receptions against UCLA in 1985, Morris is one of the Cardinal's all-time single-game pass reception leaders. Morris earned his Bachelor of Arts and Master of Arts in 1987. As one of only eight students in the United States to earn the NCAA Post-Graduate Scholarship, Morris earned his Juris Doctor with distinction from Stanford Law School in 1992.

== Career ==
After completing law school, Morris was a law clerk to Judge John T. Noonan, Jr. of the United States Court of Appeals for the Ninth Circuit and then to United States Supreme Court Chief Justice William Rehnquist. Morris is the only member of the Montana State Bar to have been a Supreme Court law clerk.

In 1995, he joined the Iran – United States Claims Tribunal at the World Court, The Hague, Netherlands, to be a legal assistant. Returning to Montana, Morris was in private practice in Bozeman from 1995 until 1999. He went on to be a legal officer at the United Nations Compensation Commission in Geneva, Switzerland.

Again returning to Montana in 2001, Morris was the Solicitor of the Department of Justice until Montana voters elected him to the Montana Supreme Court in November 2004.

=== Federal judicial service ===
On March 11, 2013, U.S. Senator Max Baucus announced that he would recommend President Obama nominate Morris to fill the vacancy on the United States District Court for the District of Montana. The vacancy, in Great Falls, was caused by Judge Sam E. Haddon assuming senior status. The recommendation was made after a number of candidates were considered by a nine-member Judicial Nominating Commission appointed by Senator Baucus and Senator Jon Tester. On May 23, 2013, President Obama formally nominated Morris to the judgeship. His nomination was reported to the floor by the United States Senate Judiciary Committee on September 19, 2013. Cloture was invoked on December 12, 2013 by a 57–40 vote. He was confirmed later that day by a 75–20 vote. He received his judicial commission on December 17, 2013.

At the time of Morris's appointment, Montana had two of the three active judge seats vacant. The inability to review cases created a significant backlog. Susan P. Watters was confirmed shortly after Morris for the Billings location.

Montana rotates chief judge status between the three active judges; because of this, Morris became chief judge on March 19, 2020.

== Notable rulings ==
=== State court ===
In 2009, Morris wrote the 6–1 decision in Kulstad v. Maniaci, in which the Court ruled in favor of a woman's right to joint custody rights of two children adopted by her same-sex partner during their relationship.

In 2010, he wrote the 4–1 decision in Wilson v. Montana that denying an inmate the use of a particular psychiatric medication did not violate the criminal's rights.

=== Federal court ===
Indigenous Environmental Network and North Coast River Alliance, and Northern Plains Resource Council vs. United States Department of State and TransCanada Keystone Pipeline and TransCanada Corporation

In November 2018 Morris issued an order to stop the construction of the Keystone XL Pipeline so that further research could be done on its environmental effects. An appeal of this order was dismissed as moot and the Order was vacated by the Ninth Circuit Court of Appeals with instructions to dismiss the district court actions.

Bullock, et al. v. IRS In July 2019 Morris issued an order overturning a rule issued by the Internal Revenue Service that allowed 501(c)(4) "social-welfare" organizations to shield the identities of their political donors. Subsequently the IRS has ended the reporting requirements for non-501(c)(3) organizations.

== Personal life ==
Morris and his wife, Cherche Prezeau, have three sons and one daughter.

== See also ==
- List of law clerks for the chief justice of the United States

Legal offices
Preceded by Jim Regnier	Associate Justice of the Montana Supreme Court; 2005–2013	Succeeded by Jim Shea
Preceded by Sam E. Haddon	Judge of the United States District Court for the District of Montana; 2013–present	Incumbent
Preceded by Dana L. Christensen	Chief Judge of the United States District Court for the District of Montana; 2020–present	Incumbent
