= James H. Baldwin =

American judge

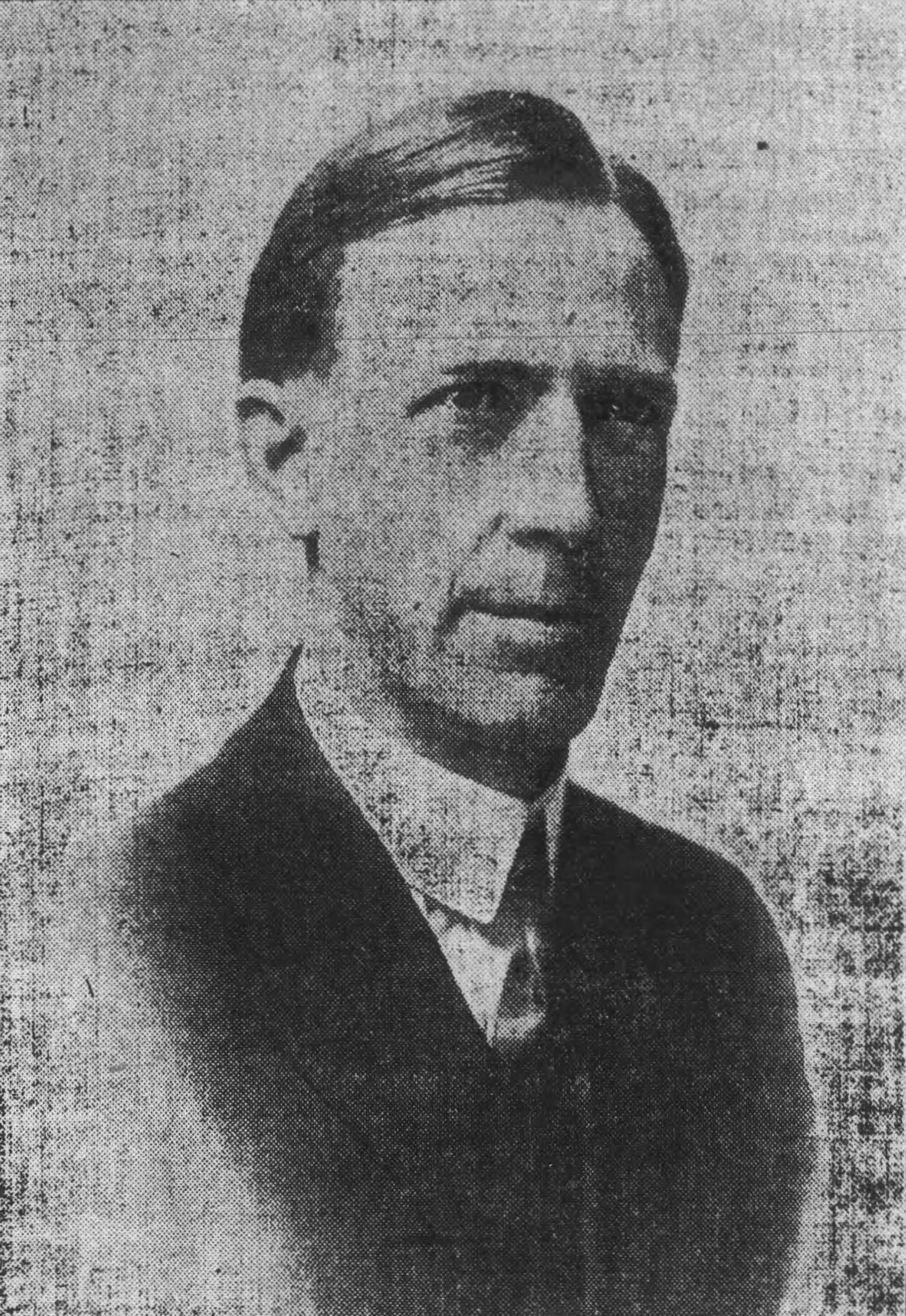

Judge of the United States District Court for the District of Montana
- In office June 4, 1935 – October 26, 1944
- Appointed by: Franklin D. Roosevelt
- Preceded by: George M. Bourquin
- Succeeded by: Robert Lewis Brown Sr.

Personal details
- Born: James Harris Baldwin; August 1, 1876 St. Joseph, Missouri, U.S.
- Died: October 26, 1944 (aged 68)
- Education: University of Virginia (BL) read law

James Harris Baldwin (August 1, 1876 – October 26, 1944) was a United States district judge of the United States District Court for the District of Montana.

== Education and career ==
Born in St. Joseph, Missouri, Baldwin received a Bachelor of Laws from the University of Virginia in 1900, and read law to enter the bar. He was in private practice in Butte, Montana from 1900 to 1934, serving as an assistant county attorney of Silver Bow County, Montana from 1907 to 1908, and as chief deputy county attorney from 1908 to 1909. He was United States Attorney for the District of Montana from 1934 to 1935.

== Federal judicial service ==
On May 20, 1935, Baldwin was nominated by President Franklin D. Roosevelt to a seat on the United States District Court for the District of Montana vacated by Judge George M. Bourquin. Baldwin was confirmed by the United States Senate on May 29, 1935, and received his commission on June 4, 1935, serving until his death on October 26, 1944.

== Sources ==
Legal offices
Preceded by George M. Bourquin	Judge of the United States District Court for the District of Montana; 1935–1944	Succeeded by Robert Lewis Brown Sr.
