= George M. Bourquin =

American judge

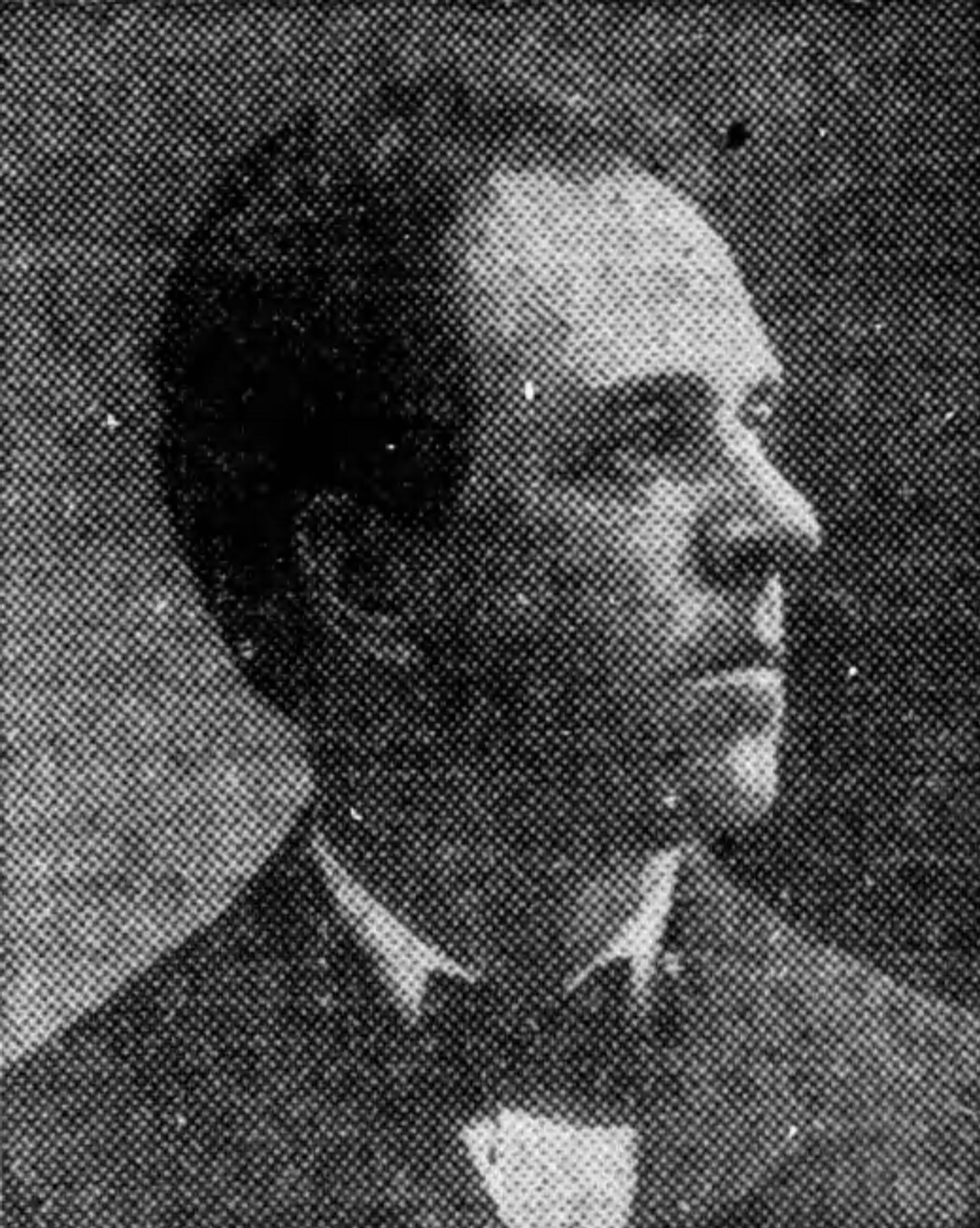

Senior Judge of the United States District Court for the District of Montana
- In office March 9, 1934 – November 15, 1958

Judge of the United States District Court for the District of Montana
- In office March 8, 1912 – March 9, 1934
- Appointed by: William Howard Taft
- Preceded by: Carl L. Rasch
- Succeeded by: James H. Baldwin

Personal details
- Born: George McClellan Bourquin; June 24, 1863 Warren County, Pennsylvania, U.S.
- Died: November 15, 1958 (aged 95)
- Education: read law

George McClellan Bourquin (June 24, 1863 – November 15, 1958) was a United States district judge of the United States District Court for the District of Montana.

== Education and career ==
Born in Warren County, Pennsylvania, Bourquin read law to enter the bar in 1894. He was in private practice in Helena, Montana from 1894 to 1899, and then in private practice in Butte, Montana until 1904. He was a district court judge for Silver Bow County, Montana from 1905 to 1909, returning to private practice in Butte until 1912.

=== Federal judicial service ===
On February 13, 1912, Bourquin was nominated by President William Howard Taft to a seat on the United States District Court for the District of Montana vacated by Judge Carl L. Rasch. Bourquin was confirmed by the United States Senate on March 8, 1912, and received his commission the same day. He assumed senior status on March 9, 1934, serving in that capacity until his death on November 15, 1958.

== See also ==
- List of United States federal judges by longevity of service

== Sources ==
Party political offices
Preceded by Joseph M. Dixon	Republican nominee for U.S. Senator from Montana (Class 1); 1934	Succeeded by E. K. Cheadle
Legal offices
Preceded by Carl L. Rasch	Judge of the United States District Court for the District of Montana; 1912–1934	Succeeded by James H. Baldwin
