= Russell Evans Smith =

American judge

Senior Judge of the United States District Court for the District of Montana
- In office May 12, 1979 – March 29, 1990

Chief Judge of the United States District Court for the District of Montana
- In office 1968–1978
- Preceded by: William James Jameson
- Succeeded by: James F. Battin

Judge of the United States District Court for the District of Montana
- In office March 26, 1966 – May 12, 1979
- Appointed by: Lyndon B. Johnson
- Preceded by: William Daniel Murray
- Succeeded by: Paul G. Hatfield

Personal details
- Born: Russell Evans Smith; November 16, 1908 Butte, Montana, U.S.
- Died: March 29, 1990 (aged 81)
- Education: Alexander Blewett III School of Law (LL.B.)

Russell Evans Smith (November 16, 1908 – March 29, 1990) was a United States district judge of the United States District Court for the District of Montana.

== Education and career ==
Born in Butte, Montana, Smith received a Bachelor of Laws from the Alexander Blewett III School of Law at the University of Montana in 1931. He was a marshal and law clerk to the Montana Supreme Court from 1931 to 1933. He was in private practice in Cut Bank, Montana, from 1933 to 1935, and in Missoula, Montana, from 1935 to 1942. He was an instructor at the Alexander Blewett III School of Law from 1937 to 1942, and was then chief attorney of Montana's Office of Price Administration from 1942 to 1943. He was a lieutenant in the United States Navy, in Aviation Combat Information during World War II, from 1943 to 1945. He returned to private practice in Missoula from 1945 to 1966, also continuing to teach at the Alexander Blewett III School of Law from 1946 to 1966.

== Federal judicial service ==
On February 16, 1966, Smith was nominated by President Lyndon B. Johnson to a seat on the United States District Court for the District of Montana vacated by Judge William Daniel Murray. Smith was confirmed by the United States Senate on March 25, 1966, and received his commission the following day. He served as Chief Judge from 1968 to 1978, assuming senior status on May 12, 1979. He served in that capacity until his death on March 29, 1990.

== Honor ==
The Russell Smith Courthouse in Missoula is named for him.

== Sources ==
Legal offices
Preceded by William Daniel Murray	Judge of the United States District Court for the District of Montana; 1966–1979	Succeeded by Paul G. Hatfield
Preceded by William James Jameson	Chief Judge of the United States District Court for the District of Montana; 1968–1978	Succeeded by James F. Battin
