= Jack D. Shanstrom =

American judge (1932–2020)

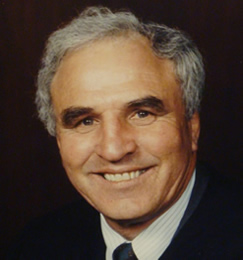

Senior Judge of the United States District Court for the District of Montana
- In office January 30, 2001 – January 13, 2020

Chief Judge of the United States District Court for the District of Montana
- In office 1996–2001
- Preceded by: Paul G. Hatfield
- Succeeded by: Donald W. Molloy

Judge of the United States District Court for the District of Montana
- In office May 14, 1990 – January 30, 2001
- Appointed by: George H. W. Bush
- Preceded by: James F. Battin
- Succeeded by: Richard F. Cebull

Magistrate Judge of the United States District Court for the District of Montana
- In office 1983–1990

Personal details
- Born: November 30, 1932 Hewitt, Minnesota, U.S.
- Died: January 13, 2020 (aged 87) Palm Desert, California, U.S.
- Education: University of Montana (BA, BS); University of Montana School of Law (LLB)

Jack Dale Shanstrom (November 30, 1932 – January 13, 2020) was a United States district judge of the United States District Court for the District of Montana.

== Education and career ==
Born in Hewitt, Minnesota, Shanstrom received a Bachelor of Arts degree from the University of Montana in 1956, a Bachelor of Science degree from the University of Montana in 1957, and a Bachelor of Laws from the University of Montana School of Law in 1957. He was a United States Air Force first lieutenant, JAG Corps from 1957 to 1960. He was in private practice in Livingston, Montana from 1960 to 1964. He was an assistant city attorney of Livingston in 1960. He was a Park County attorney of Livingston from 1960 to 1965. He was a district court judge, Park County, Montana from 1965 to 1982.

== Federal judicial service ==
Shanstrom served as a United States magistrate judge of the United States District Court for the District of Montana from 1983 to 1990. He was nominated by President George H. W. Bush on February 23, 1990, to a seat on the United States District Court for the District of Montana vacated by Judge James F. Battin. He was confirmed by the United States Senate on May 11, 1990, and received his commission on May 14, 1990. He served as Chief Judge from 1996 to 2001. He assumed senior status on January 30, 2001, due to a certified disability, and retired into inactive senior status on September 15, 2013, meaning that while he remained a federal judge, he no longer heard cases or participated in the business of the court. Shanstrom died on January 13, 2020, at his home in Palm Desert, California of the effects of Parkinson's disease. He was 87 years old.

== Sources ==
- "Jack Dale Shanstrom Obituary". The Billings Gazette.

Legal offices
Preceded by James F. Battin	Judge of the United States District Court for the District of Montana; 1990–2001	Succeeded by Richard F. Cebull
Preceded by Paul G. Hatfield	Chief Judge of the United States District Court for the District of Montana; 1996–2001	Succeeded by Donald W. Molloy
