= William Henry Hunt (judge) =

American judge (1857–1949)

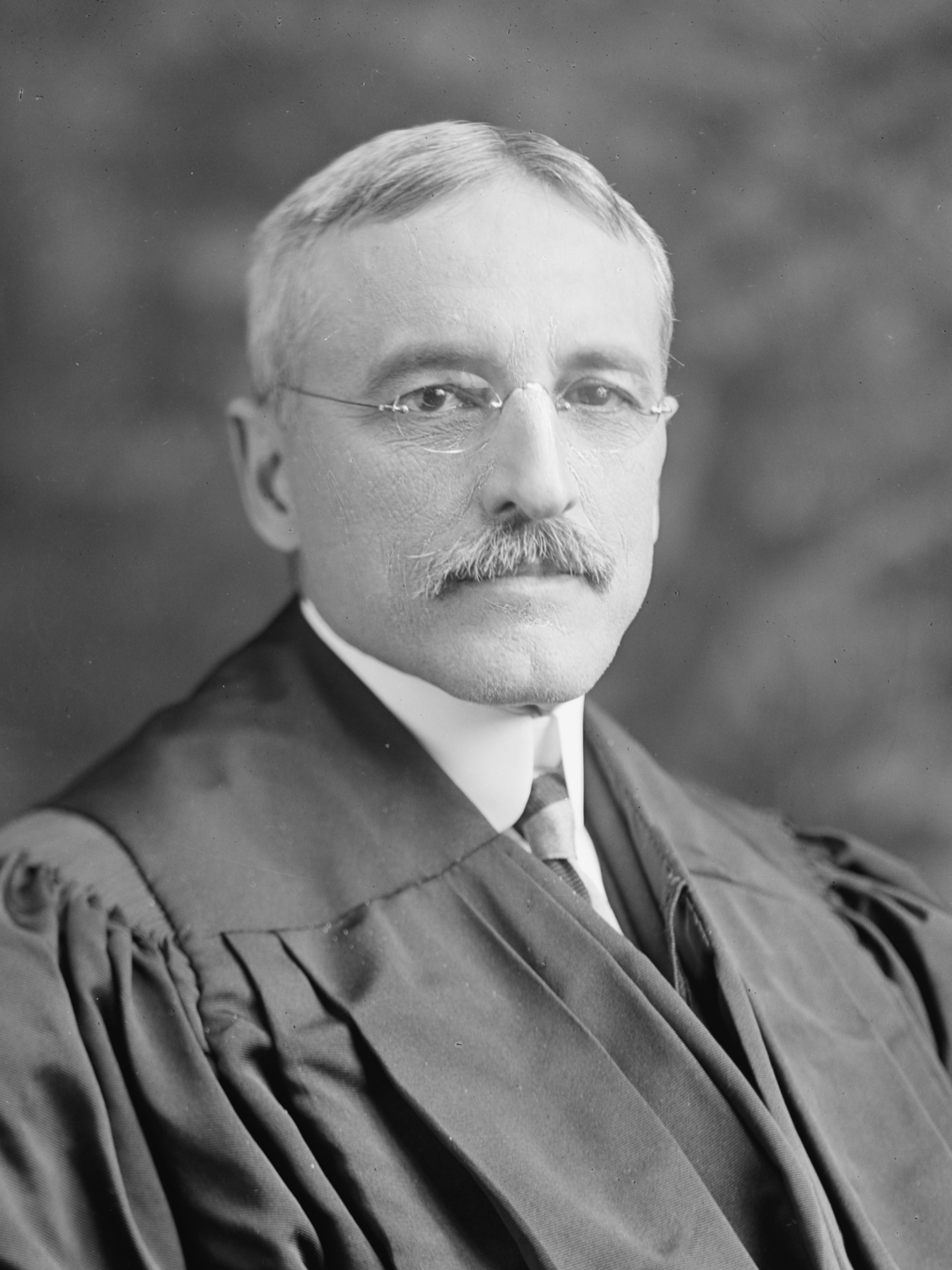

Senior Judge of the United States Court of Appeals for the Ninth Circuit
- In office January 31, 1928 – November 30, 1928

Judge of the United States Court of Appeals for the Ninth Circuit
- In office February 8, 1911 – January 31, 1928
- Appointed by: William Howard Taft
- Preceded by: Seat established by 36 Stat. 539
- Succeeded by: Seat abolished

Judge of the United States Circuit Courts for the Ninth Circuit
- In office February 8, 1911 – December 31, 1911
- Appointed by: William Howard Taft
- Preceded by: Seat established by 36 Stat. 539
- Succeeded by: Seat abolished

Judge of the United States Commerce Court
- In office February 8, 1911 – December 13, 1913
- Appointed by: William Howard Taft
- Preceded by: Seat established by 36 Stat. 539
- Succeeded by: Seat abolished

Judge of the United States Court of Customs Appeals
- In office March 30, 1910 – January 31, 1911
- Appointed by: William Howard Taft
- Preceded by: Seat established by 36 Stat. 11
- Succeeded by: George Ewing Martin

Judge of the United States District Court for the District of Montana
- In office April 19, 1904 – March 30, 1910
- Appointed by: Theodore Roosevelt
- Preceded by: Hiram Knowles
- Succeeded by: Carl L. Rasch

Governor of Puerto Rico
- In office September 15, 1901 – July 4, 1904
- Appointed by: Theodore Roosevelt
- Preceded by: Charles Herbert Allen
- Succeeded by: Beekman Winthrop

Member of the Montana House of Representatives
- In office 1889

Personal details
- Born: William Henry Hunt; November 5, 1857 New Orleans, Louisiana, US
- Died: February 4, 1949 (aged 91) Charlottesville, Virginia, US
- Education: read law

William Henry Hunt (November 5, 1857 – February 4, 1949) was the governor of Puerto Rico, a United States district judge of the United States District Court for the District of Montana, associate judge of the United States Court of Customs Appeals and a United States circuit judge of the United States Customs Court, the United States Court of Appeals for the Ninth Circuit and the United States Circuit Courts for the Ninth Circuit.

== Education and career ==
Born on November 5, 1857, in New Orleans, Louisiana, Hunt read law in 1880. He entered private practice in Fort Benton, Montana Territory from 1880 to 1887. He was Collector of Customs for the Montana Territory and Idaho Territory from 1881 to 1885. He was a delegate to the Montana Constitutional Convention in 1884. He was Attorney General of the Montana Territory from 1885 to 1887. He was a member of the Montana House of Representatives in 1889. He was a Judge of the Montana District Court for the First Judicial District from 1889 to 1894. He was a justice of the Montana Supreme Court from 1894 to 1900. He was the Secretary of Puerto Rico from 1900 to 1901. He was Governor of Puerto Rico from 1901 to 1904.

=== Notable orders as Governor ===
During his governorship, Hunt signed numerous Executive Orders, including those that made Christmas Day and Thanksgiving Day legal holidays in Puerto Rico.

== Federal judicial service ==
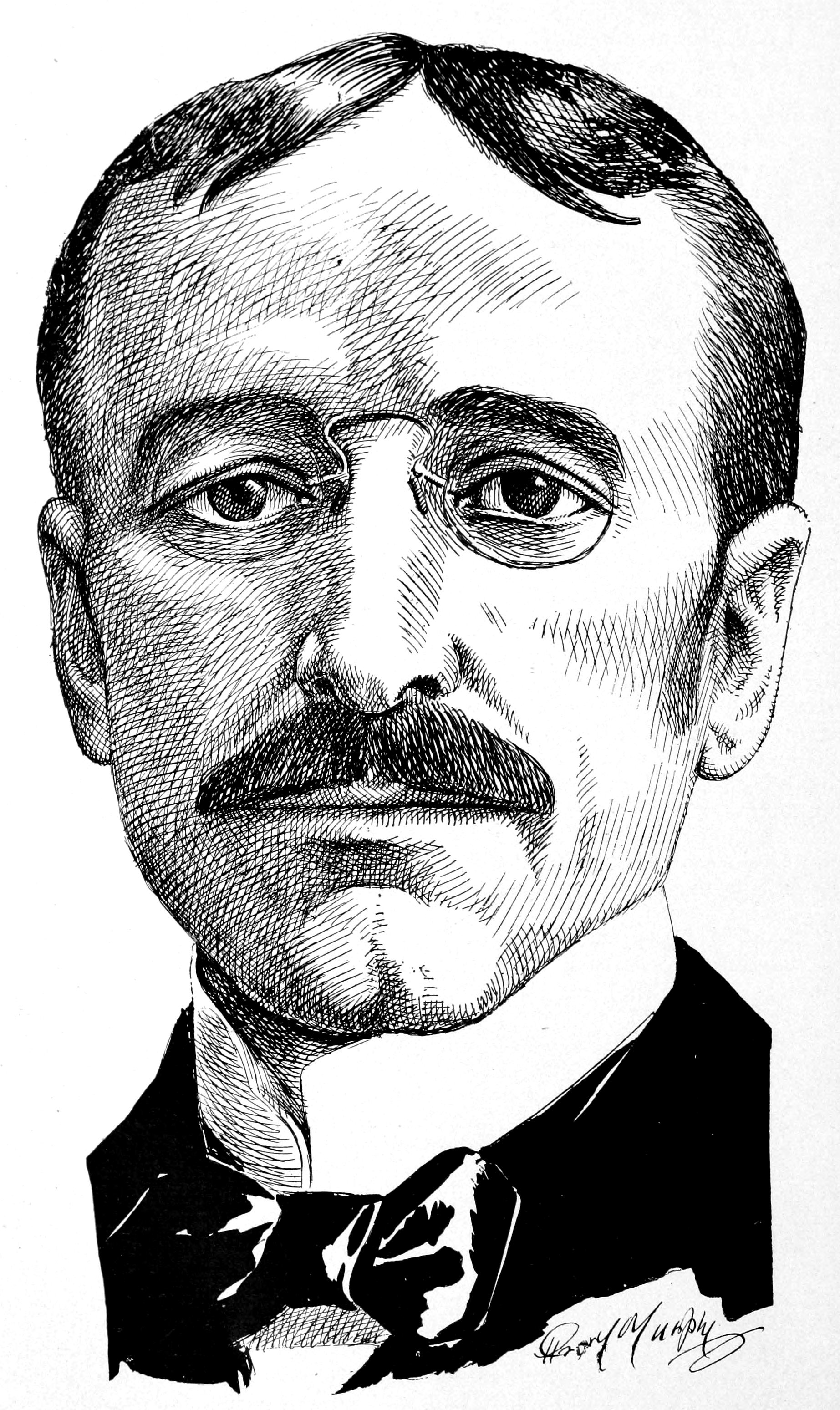
Judge William Henry Hunt illustration in 1908 book, Looters of the Public Domain. He had a "reputation for fairness."

Hunt was nominated by President Theodore Roosevelt on April 14, 1904, to a seat on the United States District Court for the District of Montana vacated by Judge Hiram Knowles. He was confirmed by the United States Senate on April 19, 1904, and received his commission the same day. His service terminated on March 30, 1910, due to his elevation to the United States Court of Customs Appeals.

Hunt was nominated by President William Howard Taft on March 9, 1910, to the United States Court of Customs Appeals (later the United States Court of Customs and Patent Appeals), to a new Associate Judge seat authorized by 36 Stat. 11. He was confirmed by the Senate on March 30, 1910, and received his commission the same day. His service terminated on January 31, 1911, due to his elevation to the Commerce Court and Ninth Circuit.

Hunt was nominated by President Taft on December 12, 1910, to the United States Commerce Court, the United States Court of Appeals for the Ninth Circuit and the United States Circuit Courts for the Ninth Circuit, to a new joint seat authorized by 36 Stat. 539. He was confirmed by the Senate on January 31, 1911, and received his commission on February 8, 1911. On December 31, 1911, the Circuit Courts were abolished and he thereafter served on the Commerce Court and Court of Appeals. On December 13, 1913, the Commerce Court was abolished and he thereafter served only on the Court of Appeals. He assumed senior status on January 31, 1928. His service terminated on November 30, 1928, due to his retirement.

== Later career and death ==
Following his retirement from the federal bench, Hunt resumed private practice in San Francisco, California, from 1928 to 1942. He died on February 4, 1949, in Charlottesville, Virginia.

== Sources ==
Political offices
Preceded by Charles Herbert Allen	Governor of Puerto Rico; September 15, 1901 – July 4, 1904	Succeeded by Beekman Winthrop
Legal offices
Preceded by Hiram Knowles	Judge of the United States District Court for the District of Montana; 1904–1910	Succeeded by Carl L. Rasch
Preceded by Seat established by 36 Stat. 11	Judge of the United States Court of Customs Appeals; 1910–1911	Succeeded by George Ewing Martin
Preceded by Seat established by 36 Stat. 539	Judge of the United States Commerce Court; 1911–1913	Succeeded by Seat abolished
Preceded by Seat established by 36 Stat. 539	Judge of the United States Circuit Courts for the Ninth Circuit; 1911	Succeeded by Seat abolished
Preceded by Seat established by 36 Stat. 539	Judge of the United States Court of Appeals for the Ninth Circuit; 1911–1928	Succeeded by Seat abolished
