= Katie Lane =

American judge (born 1991)

Kathleen Smithgall Lane
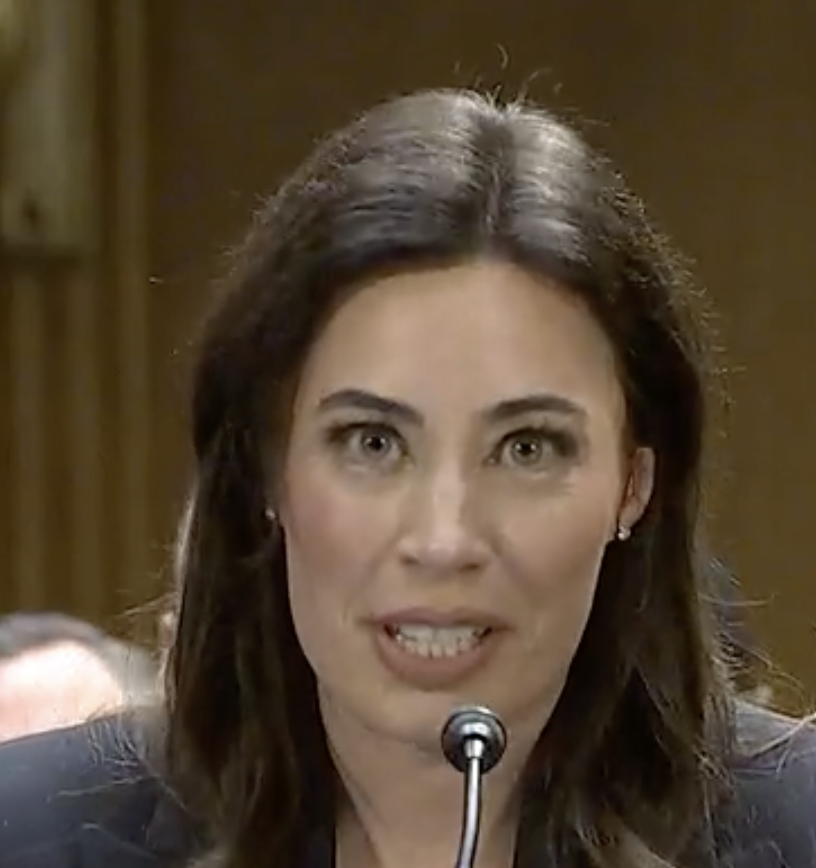

Judge of the United States District Court for the District of Montana
- Incumbent
- Assumed office June 18, 2026
- Appointed by: Donald Trump
- Preceded by: Susan P. Watters

Personal details
- Born: Kathleen Lynn Smithgall; 1991 (age 34–35) Atlanta, Georgia, U.S.
- Education: Furman University (BA); George Mason University (JD)

Kathleen Smithgall Lane (née Smithgall; born 1991) is an American lawyer who has served as a United States district judge of the United States District Court for the District of Montana since 2026. She was a senior litigation attorney for the Republican National Committee from 2025 to 2026. The American Bar Association rated Lane "not qualified" due to her lack of legal experience.

== Early life and education ==
Lane was born Kathleen Lynn Smithgall in 1991 in Atlanta, Georgia. She received her Bachelor of Arts degree from Furman University in 2014 and her Juris Doctor from Antonin Scalia Law School at George Mason University in 2017. She clerked for Judge Thomas A. Varlan of the United States District Court for the Eastern District of Tennessee from 2017 to 2018 and Judge Timothy Tymkovich of the United States Court of Appeals for the Tenth Circuit from 2019 to 2020.

== Career ==
Lane worked as an associate at Jones Day at its Washington, D.C. office from 2020 to 2021. She then served as the Deputy Solicitor General of Montana from 2021 to 2023. She subsequently worked as an associate at Consovoy McCarthy PLLC in Arlington from 2023 to 2025. From 2025 to 2026, Lane served as a senior litigation attorney for the Republican National Committee.

=== Federal judicial service ===
In December 2025, Lane was recommended to the Trump administration by United States Senator Steve Daines. On February 12, 2026, President Donald Trump announced his intention to nominate Lane to the seat on the United States District Court for the District of Montana being vacated by Judge Susan P. Watters. On March 27, 2026, the Senate Judiciary Committee held a confirmation hearing on Lane and several other nominees and she faced questions from Democrats about her legal experience and the fact that she has been licensed to practice law for only 9 years, short of the American Bar Association's (ABA) recommended 12 years. In April 2026, the ABA rated Lane "not qualified"; the only judicial nominee during the second Trump administration to receive the "not qualified" rating as of June 2026. On April 30, 2026, the Judiciary Committee reported her nomination to the floor on a 12–10 party-line vote. On June 1, 2026, the United States Senate invoked cloture on her nomination 50–44. On June 2, 2026, the Senate confirmed her nomination 52–46. She received her judicial commission on June 18, 2026.

== Personal life ==
Lane married Will Lane on October 21, 2023.

Legal offices
Preceded by Susan P. Watters	Judge of the United States District Court for the District of Montana; 2026–present	Incumbent
