= Hiram Knowles =

United States district judge (1834–1911)

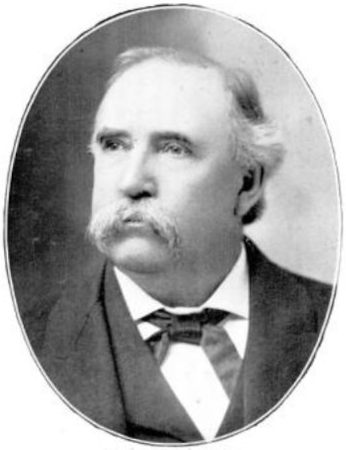

Judge of the United States District Court for the District of Montana
- In office February 21, 1890 – April 15, 1904
- Appointed by: Benjamin Harrison
- Preceded by: Seat established by 25 Stat. 676
- Succeeded by: William Henry Hunt

Personal details
- Born: January 18, 1834 Hampden, Maine
- Died: April 6, 1911 (aged 77) Idaho Falls, Idaho
- Education: Antioch College; Harvard Law School (LL.B.)

Hiram Knowles (January 18, 1834 – April 6, 1911) was a United States district judge of the United States District Court for the District of Montana.

== Education and career ==
Born in Hampden, Maine, Knowles attended Antioch College and received a Bachelor of Laws from Harvard Law School in 1860. He was in private practice in Keokuk, Iowa from 1860 to 1862, then in Dayton, Missouri in 1862 and in Humboldt County, Nevada Territory from 1862 to 1863. He was a district attorney of Humboldt County, Nevada Territory (State of Nevada from October 31, 1864) from 1863 to 1864, and a Humboldt County probate judge from 1864 to 1865 before resuming his private practice in Deer Lodge, Montana Territory from 1866 to 1868. He was an Associate Justice of the Supreme Court of the Territory of Montana from 1868 to 1879. He was again in private practice in Butte, Montana Territory (State of Montana from November 8, 1889) from 1879 to 1890.

== Federal judicial service ==
On January 6, 1890, Knowles was nominated by President Benjamin Harrison to a new seat on the United States District Court for the District of Montana created by 25 Stat. 676. He was confirmed by the United States Senate on February 21, 1890, and received his commission the same day. Knowles retired from the bench on April 15, 1904. He returned to private practice in Missoula, Montana until his death on April 6, 1911, near Idaho Falls, Idaho.

== Sources ==
Legal offices
Preceded by Seat established by 25 Stat. 676	Judge of the United States District Court for the District of Montana; 1890–1904	Succeeded by William Henry Hunt
