= William Daniel Murray =

American judge

Senior Judge of the United States District Court for the District of Montana
- In office December 31, 1965 – October 3, 1994

Chief Judge of the United States District Court for the District of Montana
- In office 1957–1965
- Preceded by: Charles Nelson Pray
- Succeeded by: William James Jameson

Judge of the United States District Court for the District of Montana
- In office May 9, 1949 – December 31, 1965
- Appointed by: Harry S. Truman
- Preceded by: Robert Lewis Brown Sr.
- Succeeded by: Russell Evans Smith

Personal details
- Born: William Daniel Murray; November 20, 1908 Butte, Montana, U.S.
- Died: October 3, 1994 (aged 85) Butte, Montana, U.S.
- Education: Columbia University; Georgetown University (B.S.); Alexander Blewett III School of Law (LL.B.)

William Daniel Murray (November 20, 1908 – October 3, 1994) was a United States district judge of the United States District Court for the District of Montana.

== Education and career ==
Born in Butte, Montana, Murray attended Columbia University, and received a Bachelor of Science degree from Georgetown University in 1932, and a Bachelor of Laws from the Alexander Blewett III School of Law at the University of Montana in 1936. He was a United States Naval Reserve Lieutenant during World War II from 1942 to 1945, and was otherwise in private practice in Butte between 1936 and 1949, and an Assistant United States Attorney of the District of Montana from 1938 to 1942.

== Federal judicial service ==
On April 5, 1949, Murray was nominated by President Harry S. Truman to a seat on the United States District Court for the District of Montana vacated by Judge Robert Lewis Brown Sr. Murray was confirmed by the United States Senate on May 4, 1949, and received his commission on May 9, 1949. He served as Chief Judge from 1957 to 1965, assuming senior status due to a certified disability on December 31, 1965. Murray served in that capacity until his death on October 3, 1994, in Butte.

== Family ==
Murray was the son of United States Senator James E. Murray.

== See also ==
- List of United States federal judges by longevity of service

Legal offices
Preceded by Robert Lewis Brown Sr.	Judge of the United States District Court for the District of Montana; 1949–1965	Succeeded by Russell Evans Smith
Preceded by Charles Nelson Pray	Chief Judge of the United States District Court for the District of Montana; 1957–1965	Succeeded by William James Jameson
