= Carl L. Rasch =

American judge

Judge of the United States District Court for the District of Montana
- In office May 2, 1910 – October 15, 1911
- Appointed by: William Howard Taft
- Preceded by: William Henry Hunt
- Succeeded by: George M. Bourquin

Personal details
- Born: Carl L. Rasch; May 8, 1866 Schleswig-Holstein; German Confederation
- Died: February 2, 1961 (aged 94) Helena, Montana, U.S.
- Education: Cornell College (Ph.B.); Chicago College of Law (LL.B.)

Carl L. Rasch (May 8, 1866 – February 2, 1961) was a United States district judge of the United States District Court for the District of Montana.

== Education and career ==
Born in Schleswig-Holstein, German Confederation, Rasch received a Bachelor of Philosophy degree from Cornell College in Mount Vernon, Iowa, in 1889 and a Bachelor of Laws from Chicago College of Law (now Chicago-Kent College of Law) in 1890. He was in private practice in Helena, Montana starting in 1891. He was the United States Attorney for the District of Montana from 1902 to 1908.

== Federal judicial service ==
On April 26, 1910, Rasch was nominated by President William Howard Taft to a seat on the United States District Court for the District of Montana vacated by Judge William Henry Hunt. He was confirmed by the United States Senate on May 2, 1910, and received his commission the same day. Rasch served in that capacity for less than 18 months, resigning on October 15, 1911.

== Later career and death ==
Rasch returned to private practice in Helena from 1911 until his death, and from 1933 to 1938 was general counsel to the Western Life Insurance Company. He died on February 2, 1961, in Helena.

== Sources ==
Legal offices
Preceded by William Henry Hunt	Judge of the United States District Court for the District of Montana; 1910–1911	Succeeded by George M. Bourquin
