= Henry L. Myers =

American politician (1862–1943)

Henry Lee Myers
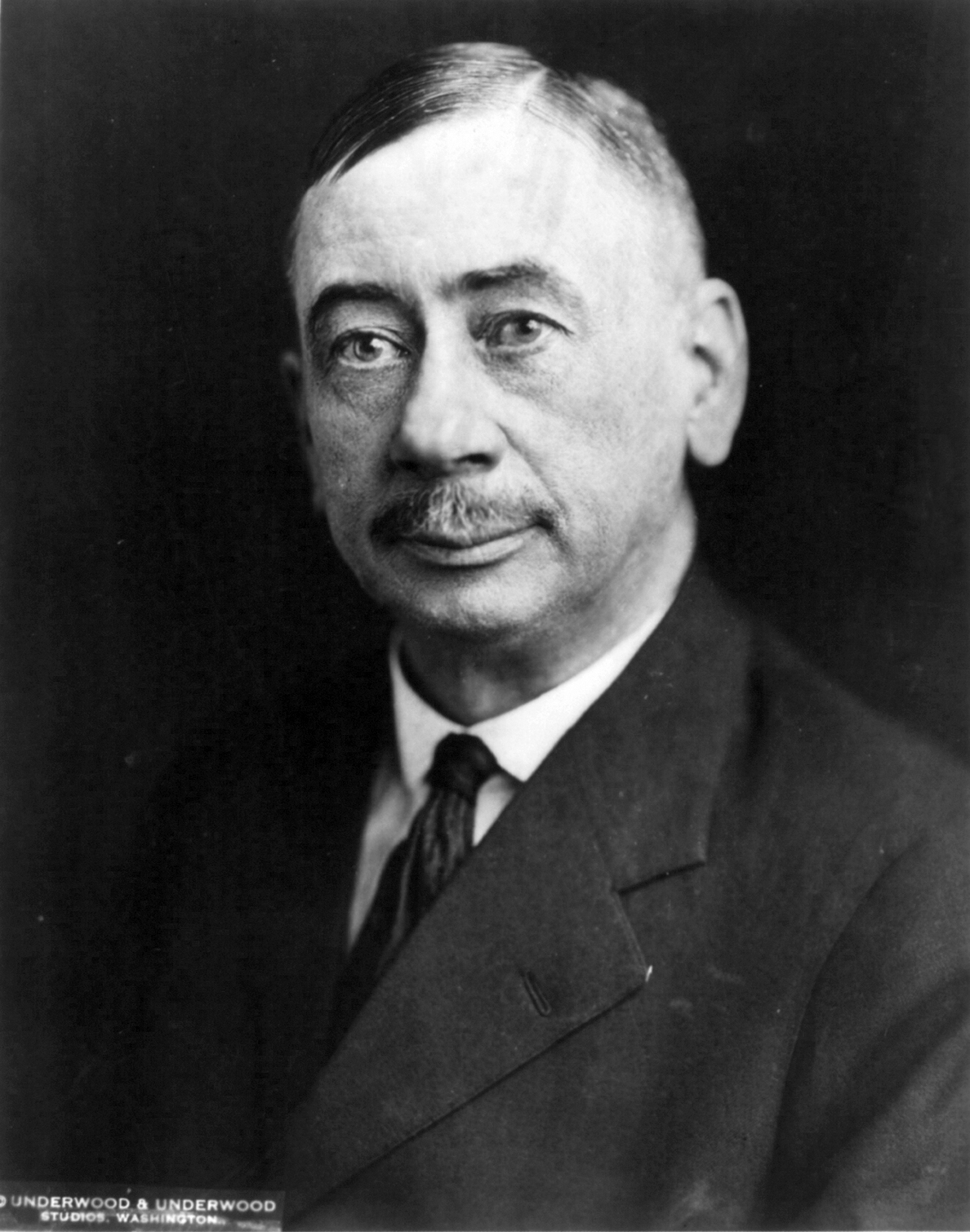

United States Senator from Montana
- In office March 4, 1911 – March 3, 1923
- Preceded by: Thomas H. Carter
- Succeeded by: Burton K. Wheeler

Montana senator
- In office 1899-1903

Personal details
- Born: October 9, 1862 Boonville, Missouri, U.S.
- Died: November 11, 1943 (aged 81) Billings, Montana, U.S.
- Resting place: Riverview Cemetery, Hamilton, Montana, U.S.
- Party: Democratic
- Profession: Law

Henry Lee Myers (October 9, 1862 – November 11, 1943) was a United States senator from Montana.

== Biography ==
Born near Boonville, Missouri, he attended Cooper Institute and Boonville Academy, both private schools. He studied law and was admitted to the Missouri Bar Association in 1884, commencing practice in Boonville. He moved to Hamilton, Montana in 1893, and was prosecuting attorney of Ravalli County, Montana from 1895 to 1899. He was a member of the Montana Senate from 1899 to 1903, and was a district judge of the fourth judicial district of Montana from 1907 to 1911.

Myers was elected as a Democrat to the U.S. Senate in 1910 and reelected in 1916, serving from March 4, 1911 until March 3, 1923. He declined to be a candidate for renomination in 1922. While in the Senate, he was chairman of the Committee on Irrigation and Reclamation of Arid Lands (Sixty-third Congress) and a member of the Committees on Public Lands (Sixty-third through Sixty-fifth Congresses), and Indian Depredations (Sixty-sixth Congress). In 1923, he moved to Billings, Montana and continued the practice of his profession. He was appointed associate justice of the Supreme Court of Montana in 1927 and once again resumed the practice of law in 1929.

He died in Billings, Montana in 1943 and was interred in Riverview Cemetery in Hamilton, Montana.

Party political offices
First	Democratic nominee for U.S. Senator from Montana (Class 1); 1916	Succeeded by Burton K. Wheeler
U.S. Senate
Preceded by Thomas H. Carter	U.S. senator (Class 1) from Montana; 1911–1923	Succeeded by Burton K. Wheeler
