= Susan P. Watters =

American judge (born 1958)

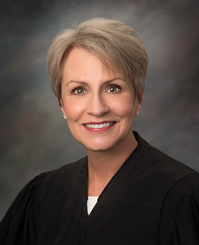

Senior Judge of the United States District Court for the District of Montana
- Incumbent
- Assumed office June 8, 2026

Judge of the United States District Court for the District of Montana
- In office December 18, 2013 – June 8, 2026
- Appointed by: Barack Obama
- Preceded by: Richard F. Cebull
- Succeeded by: Katie Lane

Personal details
- Born: June 8, 1958 (age 68) Billings, Montana, U.S.
- Education: Eastern Montana College (BA); University of Montana (JD)

Susan Pamela Watters (born June 8, 1958) is an American attorney serving as a senior United States district judge of the United States District Court for the District of Montana. She is the first female judge to serve in the District of Montana.

== Early life and education ==
Watters was born in 1958, in Billings, Montana. She earned a Bachelor of Arts degree in 1980 from Eastern Montana College. She then received a Juris Doctor in 1988 from the University of Montana School of Law.

== Career ==
From 1988 to 1989, she served as a law clerk to Diane Barz on the Thirteenth Judicial District Court of Montana. From 1989 to 1995, she served as a Deputy County Attorney in Yellowstone County, Montana. From 1995 to 1996 she was a sole practitioner focusing on criminal defense. From 1996 to 1998, she practiced both civil and criminal litigation at the law firm of Hendrickson, Everson, Noennig & Woodward, P.C. in Billings, Montana. From 1998 to 2013, she served as a judge of the Thirteenth Judicial District Court of Montana.

=== Federal judicial service ===
On May 23, 2013, President Barack Obama nominated Watters to serve as a United States district judge of the United States District Court for the District of Montana. This was to fill the seat in Billings vacated by Judge Richard F. Cebull, who took senior status on March 18, 2013. Her nomination was reported by the Senate Judiciary Committee on September 19, 2013. Cloture was invoked on her nomination on December 12, 2013, by a 58–39 vote. She was confirmed later that day by a 77–19 vote. She received her judicial commission on December 18, 2013. She assumed senior status on June 8, 2026.

At the time of Watters's appointment, Montana had two of the three active judge seats vacant. The inability to review cases created a significant backlog. Brian Morris was confirmed shortly before Morris for the Great Falls location.

On January 31, 2024, Watters denied a motion to dismiss a charge under the federal Gun-Free School Zones Act as unconstitutional under the Second Amendment.

== See also ==
- List of first women lawyers and judges in Montana

Legal offices
Preceded by Richard F. Cebull	Judge of the United States District Court for the District of Montana; 2013–2026	Succeeded by Katie Lane
