= Dana L. Christensen =

American judge (born 1951)

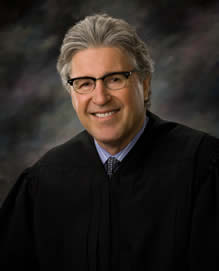

Senior Judge of the United States District Court for the District of Montana
- Incumbent
- Assumed office November 7, 2025

Chief Judge of the United States District Court for the District of Montana
- In office March 19, 2013 – March 19, 2020
- Preceded by: Richard F. Cebull
- Succeeded by: Brian Morris

Judge of the United States District Court for the District of Montana
- In office December 6, 2011 – November 7, 2025
- Appointed by: Barack Obama
- Preceded by: Donald W. Molloy
- Succeeded by: William W. Mercer

Personal details
- Born: Dana Lewis Christensen; March 23, 1951 (age 75) New York City, U.S.
- Education: Stanford University (BA); University of Montana (JD)

Dana Lewis Christensen (born May 23, 1951) is a senior United States district judge of the United States District Court for the District of Montana.

== Education ==
Christensen earned a Bachelor of Arts degree in history in 1973 from Stanford University and a Juris Doctor in 1976 from the University of Montana School of Law.

== Career ==
Christensen worked in private practice at various firms in Montana from 1977 to 2011. He was a civil litigator and a named partner at a firm in Kalispell, Montana from 1996 to 2011. Among other things, he worked in the area of insurance defense.

=== Federal judicial service ===
On May 4, 2011, President Barack Obama nominated Christensen to a vacant seat on the United States District Court for the District of Montana. The seat was vacated by Judge Donald W. Molloy, who assumed senior status in August 2011. Christensen's nomination was reported from the United States Senate Committee on the Judiciary on October 6, 2011. The Senate confirmed his nomination on December 5, 2011, by voice vote. He received his commission on December 6, 2011. He served as chief judge from March 19, 2013 to March 19, 2020. He took senior status on November 7, 2025.

=== Notable rulings ===
In late August 2018, Christensen placed a 14-day hold on grizzly bear hunting in Wyoming and Idaho after the U.S. Fish and Wildlife Service lifted federal protections for grizzlies in Yellowstone National Park areas in 2017. On September 24, 2018, Christensen released a 48-page ruling restoring the protections and cancelling the hunts altogether, citing that Fish & Wildlife's analysis of the threats to grizzly bears was lacking and that they "failed to make a reasoned decision" in considering the impact of delisting the Yellowstone grizzlies from protected species status.

In September 2020, Christensen rejected Republican requests, including those of Montana House Speaker Greg Hertz and Montana Senate President Scott Sales, to block Montana Governor Bullock from permitting counties in Montana to conduct voting by mail in the November 2020 General Election. Bullock claimed that preventing voting by mail during the COVID-19 pandemic would cause potential harm to people voting in person, and disenfranchise others by dissuading them from taking the risk of voting in person, rendering them unable to vote at all. Christensen upheld Bullock's ability to issue his directive, saying "the Court has no trouble concluding the COVID19 pandemic constitutes a disaster and emergency". Christensen cited precedent against changing the process of an election too close to the date of the election, or in ways that would render the election difficult to conduct. He further cited that the plaintiffs had not provided any evidence that voting by mail would lead to electoral fraud, and noted that plaintiffs were forced to admit that there had not been a single documented case of voter fraud in Montana in the previous twenty years.

In October 2025, Judge Christensen dismissed Lighthiser v. Trump for lack of jurisdiction, in which 22 youth plaintiffs had sought to invalidate executive orders by President Donald Trump that favored fossil fuels over renewable energy and climate science. Christensen's order explicitly acknowledged the harm caused to children by climate change.

Legal offices
Preceded by Donald W. Molloy	Judge of the United States District Court for the District of Montana; 2011–2025	Succeeded by William W. Mercer
Preceded by Richard F. Cebull	Chief Judge of the United States District Court for the District of Montana; 2013–2020	Succeeded by Brian Morris
