= James F. Battin =

American judge (1925–1996)

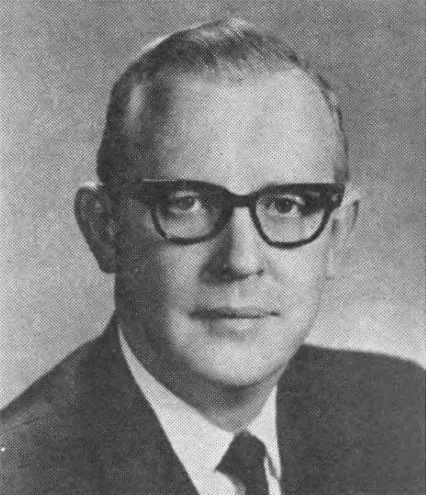

Senior Judge of the United States District Court for the District of Montana
- In office February 13, 1990 – September 27, 1996

Chief Judge of the United States District Court for the District of Montana
- In office November 16, 1978 – February 13, 1990
- Preceded by: Russell Evans Smith
- Succeeded by: Paul G. Hatfield

Judge of the United States District Court for the District of Montana
- In office February 27, 1969 – February 13, 1990
- Appointed by: Richard Nixon
- Preceded by: William James Jameson
- Succeeded by: Jack D. Shanstrom

Member of the U.S. House of Representatives from Montana's 2nd district
- In office January 3, 1961 – February 27, 1969
- Preceded by: LeRoy H. Anderson
- Succeeded by: John Melcher

Personal details
- Born: James Franklin Battin; February 13, 1925 Wichita, Kansas, U.S.
- Died: September 27, 1996 (aged 71) Billings, Montana, U.S.
- Party: Republican
- Education: Eastern Montana College (B.A.); George Washington University Law School (J.D.)

James Franklin Battin (February 13, 1925 – September 27, 1996) was a Republican United States representative from Montana, and later was a United States district judge of the United States District Court for the District of Montana.

== Education and career ==
Born in Wichita, Kansas, Battin moved with his parents to Montana in November 1929. He was educated in the public schools of Billings, then the third largest city in the state, graduating from high school there in 1942. He enlisted in the United States Navy and served for three years, two and a half years of which were in the Pacific theater of operations. He returned to his studies and graduated with a Bachelor of Arts degree in 1948 from Eastern Montana College (now Montana State University Billings) in Billings. He received a Juris Doctor from George Washington University Law School in 1951, and was in private practice of law in Washington, D.C. from 1951 to 1952, then in Billings from 1953 to 1960. He was a deputy county attorney of Yellowstone County, Montana from 1953 to 1955, then general counsel and secretary of the City-County Planning Board of Billings in 1955. In 1955 he became an assistant city attorney of Billings, and was the city attorney from 1957 to 1958. He served as member of the Montana House of Representatives in 1958 and 1959. Battin was elected as a Republican to the Eighty-seventh and to the three succeeding Congresses, and served from January 3, 1961, until his resignation February 27, 1969, to become United States District Judge.

== Federal judicial service ==
Battin was nominated by President Richard Nixon on February 20, 1969, to a seat on the United States District Court for the District of Montana vacated by Judge William James Jameson. He was confirmed by the United States Senate on February 25, 1969, and received his commission on February 27, 1969. He served as Chief Judge from November 16, 1978, to February 13, 1990. He assumed senior status on February 13, 1990. His service terminated on September 27, 1996, due to his death in Billings.

== Family and honor ==
The James F. Battin Federal Courthouse in Billings is named for him, as was its predecessor, the James F. Battin Federal Building. Battin's son, Jim, was elected to the California State Assembly in 1994.

== Notable case ==
One of the cases that Battin handled was the conviction of four counts of extortion of the Louisiana Teamsters Union business agent Edward Grady Partin, the one who supplied the immunized testimony that sent Jimmy Hoffa to prison.

== Sources ==
- United States Congress. "James F. Battin (id: B000241)". Biographical Directory of the United States Congress.

U.S. House of Representatives
Preceded by LeRoy H. Anderson	Member of the U.S. House of Representatives from Montana's 2nd congressional district 1961-1969	Succeeded by John Melcher
Legal offices
Preceded by William James Jameson	Judge of the United States District Court for the District of Montana; 1969–1990	Succeeded by Jack D. Shanstrom
Preceded by Russell Evans Smith	Chief Judge of the United States District Court for the District of Montana; 1978–1990	Succeeded by Paul G. Hatfield
