= Charles Nelson Pray =

American politician and judge (1868–1963)

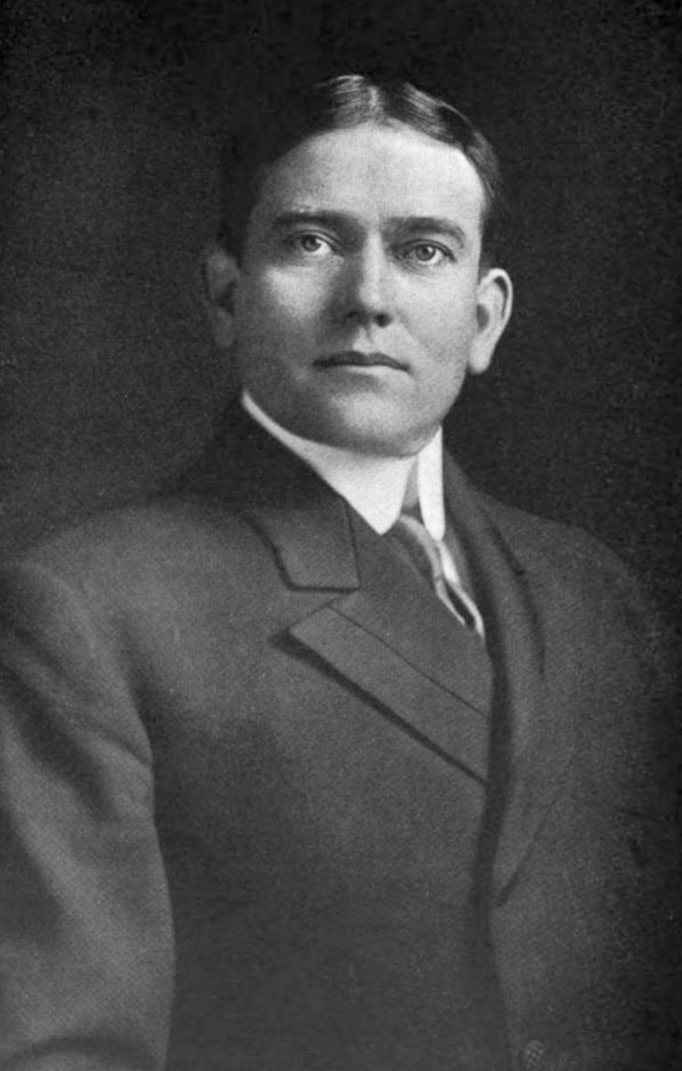

Senior Judge of the United States District Court for the District of Montana
- In office April 10, 1957 – September 12, 1963

Chief Judge of the United States District Court for the District of Montana
- In office 1948–1957
- Preceded by: Office established
- Succeeded by: William Daniel Murray

Judge of the United States District Court for the District of Montana
- In office February 8, 1924 – April 10, 1957
- Appointed by: Calvin Coolidge
- Preceded by: Seat established by 42 Stat. 837
- Succeeded by: William James Jameson

Member of the U.S. House of Representatives from Montana's at-large district
- In office March 4, 1907 – March 3, 1913
- Preceded by: Joseph M. Dixon
- Succeeded by: John M. Evans

Personal details
- Born: Charles Nelson Pray; April 6, 1868 Potsdam, New York, U.S.
- Died: September 12, 1963 (aged 95) Great Falls, Montana, U.S.
- Resting place: Hillcrest Lawn Memorial Cemetery
- Party: Republican
- Education: Middlebury College; Chicago-Kent College of Law (LL.B.)

Charles Nelson Pray (April 6, 1868 – September 12, 1963) was an American lawyer, jurist, and politician who served as a United States representative from Montana and a United States district judge of the United States District Court for the District of Montana.

== Education and career ==
Born on April 6, 1868, in Potsdam, St. Lawrence County, New York, Pray attended the public schools of Salisbury and Middlebury, Vermont, and graduated from Middlebury Union High School. He attended Middlebury College and received a Bachelor of Laws in 1891 from the Chicago College of Law (now the Chicago-Kent College of Law). He was admitted to the bar in 1892 and entered private practice in Chicago, Illinois from 1893 to 1895. He continued private practice in Fort Benton, Montana from 1896 to 1906. He was an assistant prosecutor for the Twelfth Judicial District in Chouteau County, Montana from 1897 to 1898, and Prosecutor for the same district from 1899 to 1906, being elected to that post in 1898, 1900, 1902 and 1904.

== Congressional service ==
Pray was elected as a Republican to the United States House of Representatives of the 60th, 61st and 62nd United States Congresses, serving from March 4, 1907, to March 3, 1913. He was an unsuccessful candidate for reelection in 1912 to the 63rd United States Congress.

=== After Congress ===
He resumed the practice of law in Great Falls, Cascade County, Montana starting January 1, 1914. He was an unsuccessful candidate for election to the United States Senate in 1916.

== Federal judicial service ==
Pray was nominated by President Calvin Coolidge on January 21, 1924, to the United States District Court for the District of Montana, to a new seat authorized by 42 Stat. 837. He was confirmed by the United States Senate on February 8, 1924, and received his commission the same day. He served as Chief Judge from 1948 to 1957. He assumed senior status on April 10, 1957. His service terminated on September 12, 1963, due to his death in Great Falls, Montana. He was interred in Hillcrest Lawn Memorial Cemetery.

== Papers ==
Pray's papers from his life from 1878 to 1963, including diaries and correspondence, are lodged at the University of Montana in Missoula.

== Honor ==
The town of Pray, Montana is named for Pray.

== See also ==
- List of United States federal judges by longevity of service

== Sources ==
- "Charles Nelson Pray". Biographical Directory of the United States Congress.

Party political offices
First	Republican nominee for U.S. Senator from Montana (Class 1); 1916	Succeeded by Carl W. Riddick
U.S. House of Representatives
Preceded by Joseph M. Dixon	Member of the U.S. House of Representatives from Montana's at-large congressional district 1907–1913	Succeeded by John M. Evans
Legal offices
Preceded by Seat established by 42 Stat. 837	Judge of the United States District Court for the District of Montana; 1924–1957	Succeeded by William James Jameson
Preceded by Office established	Chief Judge of the United States District Court for the District of Montana; 1948–1957	Succeeded by William Daniel Murray
