= Paul G. Hatfield =

American judge

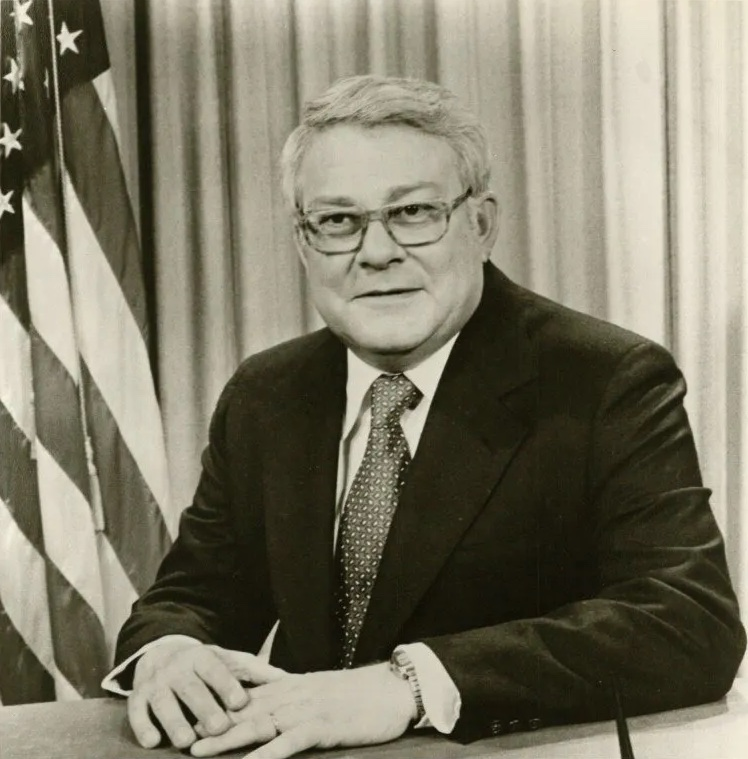

Senior Judge of the United States District Court for the District of Montana
- In office February 9, 1996 – July 3, 2000

Chief Judge of the United States District Court for the District of Montana
- In office 1990–1996
- Preceded by: James F. Battin
- Succeeded by: Jack D. Shanstrom

Judge of the United States District Court for the District of Montana
- In office May 10, 1979 – February 9, 1996
- Appointed by: Jimmy Carter
- Preceded by: Russell Evans Smith
- Succeeded by: Donald W. Molloy

United States Senator from Montana
- In office January 22, 1978 – December 14, 1978
- Appointed by: Thomas Lee Judge
- Preceded by: Lee Metcalf
- Succeeded by: Max Baucus

Personal details
- Born: Paul Gerhart Hatfield; April 29, 1928 Great Falls, Montana, U.S.
- Died: July 3, 2000 (aged 72) Great Falls, Montana, U.S.
- Party: Democratic
- Education: University of Montana (LLB)

Paul Gerhart Hatfield (April 29, 1928 – July 3, 2000) was an American attorney, politician, and jurist. He served briefly as United States Senator from Montana in 1978, and then as a United States district judge of the United States District Court for the District of Montana.

== Early life and education ==
Born in Great Falls, Montana, Hatfield attended the College of Great Falls (now University of Providence). He served in the United States Army Signal Corps with the 181st Signal Depot Company, from 1951 to 1953, including in Korea during the Korean War from 1952 to 1953. He received a Bachelor of Laws from the Alexander Blewett III School of Law at the University of Montana in Missoula in 1955.

== Career ==
Hatfield was admitted to the Montana bar that same year, commencing his practice in Great Falls. He was chief deputy county attorney for Cascade County from 1959 to 1960 and served as judge of the Eighth Judicial District from 1961 to 1976. He was elected Chief Justice of the Montana Supreme Court in the 1976 general election, defeating long-time Associate Justice Wesley Castles with a vote of 199,536 (67.5%) to 95,947 (32.5%), taking office in January 1977.

=== United States Senate ===
On January 22, 1978, Montana Governor Thomas Lee Judge appointed Hatfield to the United States Senate to fill the vacancy caused by the death of Lee Metcalf for the term ending January 3, 1979. He served from January 22, 1978, until his resignation December 14, 1978. He was defeated for nomination in the Democratic primary in June 1978 by Congressman Max Baucus with Baucus getting 87,085 votes (65.3%) to Hatfield's 25,789 (19.3%). There were two other minor candidates in the race. After that nominating defeat, Hatfield remained in the Senate until his own resignation when the election of his successor, Baucus, was officially certified after the general election in November 1978. Max Baucus praised his former primary opponent for being "one of the most decent and thoughtful people I've had the privilege of knowing."

=== Federal judicial service ===
On March 15, 1979, Hatfield was nominated by President Jimmy Carter to a seat on the United States District Court for the District of Montana vacated by Judge Russell Evans Smith. Hatfield was confirmed by the United States Senate on May 9, 1979, and received his commission the following day. He served as Chief Judge from 1990 to 1996, assuming senior status on February 9, 1996, and continuing to serve until the end of his life. Hatfield was a resident of Great Falls from 1979 until his death on July 3, 2000. He is buried in Riverside Memorial Park in Spokane, Washington.

== Death ==
Hatfield died in Great Falls, Montana in July 2000. The Paul G. Hatfield Courthouse in Helena, Montana is named in his honor.

U.S. Senate
| Preceded by Lee Metcalf | U.S. senator (Class 2) from Montana; 1978; Served alongside: John Melcher | Succeeded by Max Baucus |
Legal offices
| Preceded by James T. Harrison | Chief Justice of the Montana Supreme Court; 1977–1978 | Succeeded by Frank I. Haswell |
| Preceded by Russell Evans Smith | Judge of the United States District Court for the District of Montana; 1979–1996 | Succeeded by Donald W. Molloy |
| Preceded by James F. Battin | Chief Judge of the United States District Court for the District of Montana; 1990–1996 | Succeeded by Jack D. Shanstrom |
