= William James Jameson =

American judge (1898–1990)

Senior Judge of the United States District Court for the District of Montana
- In office February 27, 1969 – October 8, 1990

Chief Judge of the United States District Court for the District of Montana
- In office 1965–1968
- Preceded by: William Daniel Murray
- Succeeded by: Russell Evans Smith

Judge of the United States District Court for the District of Montana
- In office March 28, 1957 – February 27, 1969
- Appointed by: Dwight D. Eisenhower
- Preceded by: Charles Nelson Pray
- Succeeded by: James F. Battin

Personal details
- Born: William James Jameson; August 8, 1898 Butte, Montana, U.S.
- Died: October 8, 1990 (aged 92)
- Education: University of Montana (A.B.); Alexander Blewett III School of Law (LL.B.)

William James Jameson (August 8, 1898 – October 8, 1990) was a United States district judge of the United States District Court for the District of Montana.

== Education and career ==
Born in Butte, Montana, Jameson received an Bachelor of Arts degree from the University of Montana in 1919 and a Bachelor of Laws from the Alexander Blewett III School of Law at the University of Montana in 1922. He was in private practice in Billings, Montana from 1922 to 1957, and was a member of the Montana House of Representatives from 1927 to 1930.

== Federal judicial service ==
On March 5, 1957, Jameson was nominated by President Dwight D. Eisenhower to a seat on the United States District Court for the District of Montana vacated by Judge Charles Nelson Pray. Jameson was confirmed by the United States Senate on March 26, 1957, and received his commission on March 28, 1957. He served as Chief Judge from 1965 to 1968. He assumed senior status on February 27, 1969. He was a Judge of the Temporary Emergency Court of Appeals from 1976 to 1987. He remained in senior status until his death on October 8, 1990.

== Honors ==
In 1973, Jameson received the highest honor given by the American Bar Association, the ABA Medal. In 1970, he received the Gonzaga Law Medal], the highest honor given by the Gonzaga University School of Law. The William J. Jameson Law Library at the University of Montana School of Law is named after Jameson. The State Bar of Montana's highest honor is also named after Jameson. The William J. Jameson Award has been given annually since 1989 to a Montana attorney who, among other criteria, "Shows ethical and personal conduct, commitment and activities that exemplify the essence of professionalism".

== Sources ==
Legal offices
Preceded by Charles Nelson Pray	Judge of the United States District Court for the District of Montana; 1957–1969	Succeeded by James F. Battin
Preceded by William Daniel Murray	Chief Judge of the United States District Court for the District of Montana; 1965–1968	Succeeded by Russell Evans Smith
