= Alexander Blewett III School of Law =

Law school in Missoula, Montana, United States

Coordinates: 46°51′49″N 113°59′11″W

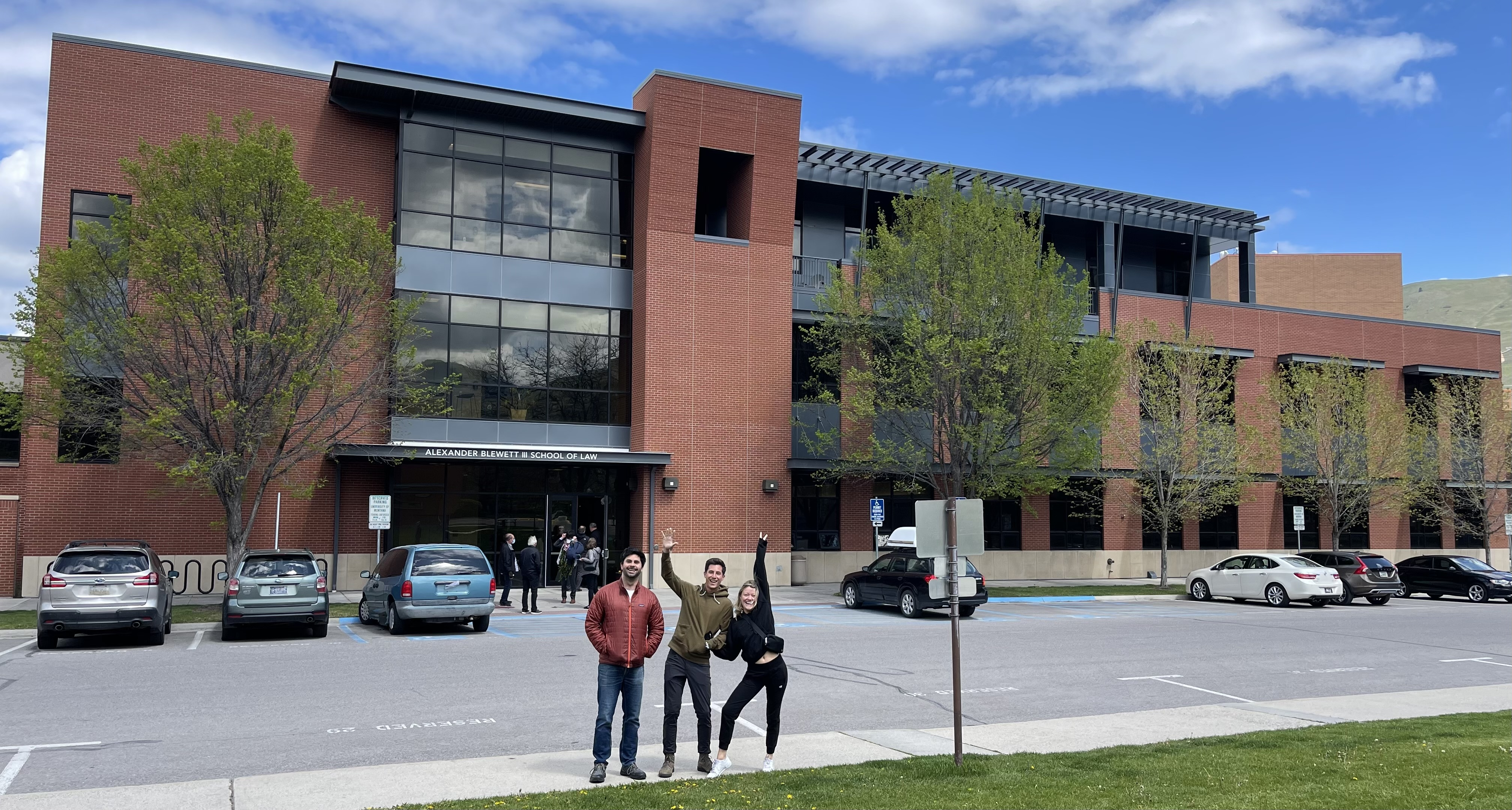
- Established: 1911
- School type: Public
- Dean: Elaine Gagliardi
- Location: Missoula, Montana, United States
- Enrollment: 247
- USNWR ranking: 96th (2024)
- Website: umt.edu/law

The Alexander Blewett III School of Law is a law school at the University of Montana in Missoula. It was established in 1911 and remains Montana's only law school. Its name was changed from the University of Montana Law School to its current name in May 2015.

== History ==
The school was established in 1911 as the first law school in Montana. It originally covered three academic years and gave special attention to the practice of court work, procedure, mining, and irrigation law in addition to the practice of law in Montana and the Western states in general. It was admitted to membership in the Association of American Law Schools in 1914 and by the American Bar Association (ABA) in 1923.

== Studies ==
The school offers concentrations in the areas of trial advocacy and dispute resolution, Native American law, and business and tax law. As Montana is home to seven Indian Reservations and to eight state-recognized tribal nations, the school's Native American law courses, Native American law clinic, and Native American Law Student Association provide opportunities for students to learn about and participate in the administration of justice for Native Americans. The school publishes the Montana Law Review.

Many students enroll in the natural resource and environmental law courses where the school offers a certificate program in Environmental and Natural Resource Law, natural resource clinics, and opportunities to participate on the Public Land and Resources Law Review. The law school's Natural Resources & Environmental Law Program (NREP) has been nationally ranked among the top 27 environmental law programs in the country, receiving an “A” grade for the breadth of its environmental training, including its certificate concentration in natural resources and environmental law, its curricular offerings, Public Land & Resources Law Review, national environmental law moot court team, Environmental Law Group, and its law clinic program focusing on natural resources and environmental law issues.

The school offers three joint–degree programs. Students can combine their law degrees with a Master of Science in Environmental Studies, a Master of Business Administration, or a Master of Public Administration. These programs can lead to completion of the joint degree in as little as three years.

== Library ==
The William J. Jameson Law Library is over 20,060 square feet (1,864 m^{2}) and holds over 100,000 print volumes that are enhanced by a multi-format audio-visual collection, extensive microform titles, and several electronic research services and databases.

== New building ==
In 2008, the school underwent a $14.8 million renovation and addition. The addition includes classrooms with better acoustics, newer technology, audio-visual equipment, disability access, and more small and mid-sized classrooms.

More space is also provided for the school's clinical program, including its land use, Native American law, criminal defense, and mediation clinics. This space includes client interview rooms, student workrooms, and office space. The renovated building also contains an expanded law library with newer technology to serve the needs students as well as the public.

== Rankings and reputation ==
The school tied for 96th in the 2023 U.S. News & World Report law school rankings. In 2009, National Jurist magazine ranked the school 6 in best value nationally, with its graduates passing the bar at a rate of 95%. The school has been praised for its innovative integration of theory and practice.

== Employment ==
According to the school's disclosures as required by the American Bar Association, 67.5% of the class of 2014 obtained full-time, long-term, JD-required employment within nine months of graduation. As of 2014 Montana's Law School Transparency under-employment score is 22.5%, indicating the percentage of the class of 2014 unemployed, pursuing an additional degree, or working in a non-professional, short-term, or part-time job nine months after graduation.

== Cost ==
The total cost of attendance including the cost of tuition, fees, and living expenses for the 2014–2015 academic year was $26,739.26 for residents and $45,424.46 for nonresidents. The Law School Transparency estimated debt-financed cost of attendance for three years at $91,827 for residents and $161,494 for nonresidents.

== Notable alumni ==
- Forrest H. Anderson (1913–1989), Montana Attorney General, Montana Governor and Montana Supreme Court Justice
- Diane Barz (1943–2014), Montana Supreme Court Justice
- Eldena Bear Don’t Walk, Chief Justice of the Crow Nation
- Gordon Belcourt, former executive director of the Montana-Wyoming Tribal Leaders Council
- George Hugo Boldt (1903–1984), United States District Judge, Western District, Washington
- John W. Bonner (1902–1970), Montana Governor
- James R. Browning (1918–2012), Clerk of the United States Supreme Court, Chief Judge United States Court of Appeals for the Ninth Circuit
- Dana L. Christensen, U.S. District Judge, Montana
- Amy Eddy, Montana Supreme Court Justice-elect
- Charles E. Erdmann, Montana Supreme Court Justice, Circuit Judge United States Court of Appeals for the Armed Forces
- Tim Fox, Montana Attorney General
- Sam E. Haddon, U.S. District Judge, Montana
- Paul G. Hatfield, U.S. District Judge, Montana, Chief Justice of the Montana Supreme Court, United States Senator
- William James Jameson (1898–1990), U.S. District Judge, Montana
- Howard A. Johnson, Chief Justice of the Montana Supreme Court
- Denise Juneau, Montana Superintendent of Public Instruction
- Charles C. Lovell, U.S. District Judge, Montana
- Sherry Scheel Matteucci, U.S. Attorney for the District of Montana
- Lee Metcalf, Montana Supreme Court Justice, United States Senator
- Donald W. Molloy, U.S. District Judge, Montana
- William Daniel Murray (1908–1994), U.S. District Judge, Montana
- Arnold Olsen (1916–1990), Attorney General, U.S. Representative
- Marc Racicot, Montana Governor, Montana Attorney General
- James A. Rice, Montana Supreme Court Justice
- Jim Shea, Montana Supreme Court Justice
- Russell Evans Smith (1908–1990), U.S. District Judge, Montana
- Jack D. Shanstrom, U.S. District Judge, Montana
- Sidney R. Thomas, Chief United States circuit judge of the United States Court of Appeals for the Ninth Circuit
- John Warner, Montana Supreme Court Justice
- Susan P. Watters, U.S. District Judge, Montana
- Martha Williams, director of the U.S. Fish & Wildlife Service
