= United States District Court for the District of Montana =

United States federal district court of Montana

- (D. Mont.)
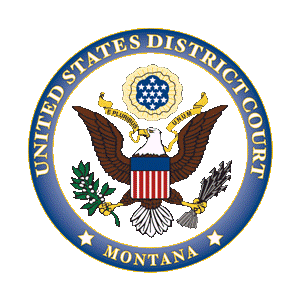

- Location: Missoula More locations: Billings; Mike Mansfield Federal Building and U.S. Courthouse (Butte); Great Falls; Helena; Glasgow; Havre; Kalispell; Lewistown; Livingston; Miles City
- Appeals to: Ninth Circuit
- Established: November 8, 1889
- Judges: 3
- Chief Judge: Brian Morris

Officers of the court
- U.S. Attorney: Mark Stegar Smith (Acting)
- www.mtd.uscourts.gov

The United States District Court for the District of Montana (in case citations, D. Mont.) is the United States District Court whose jurisdiction is the state of Montana (except the part of the state within Yellowstone National Park, which is under the jurisdiction of the United States District Court for the District of Wyoming). The court is located in Billings, Butte, Great Falls, Helena and Missoula.

Cases from the District of Montana are appealed to the United States Court of Appeals for the Ninth Circuit (except for patent claims and claims against the U.S. government under the Tucker Act, which are appealed to the Federal Circuit).

The United States Attorney's Office for the District of Montana represents the United States in civil and criminal litigation in the court. Mark Stegar Smith has served as the acting U.S. Attorney since June 1, 2026.

== History ==
The District of Montana was organized on February 22, 1889, by 25 Stat. 676, following Montana's admission to statehood. Congress organized Montana as a single judicial district, and authorized one judgeship for the district court, which was assigned to the Ninth Circuit. A temporary second judgeship was added on September 14, 1922, by 42 Stat. 837, and was made permanent on May 31, 1938, by 52 Stat. 584. On July 10, 1984, by 98 Stat. 333, the third judgeship was authorized.

== Current judges ==
As of June 18, 2026:

#	Title	Judge	Duty station	Born	Term of service			Appointed by
#	Title	Judge	Duty station	Born	Active	Chief	Senior	Appointed by
19	Chief Judge	Brian Morris	Great Falls	1963	2013–present	2020–present	—	Obama
21	District Judge	William W. Mercer	Missoula	1964	2025–present	—	—	Trump
22	District Judge	Katie Lane	Billings	1991	2026–present	—	—	Trump
15	Senior Judge	Donald W. Molloy	Missoula	1946	1996–2011	2001–2008	2011–present	Clinton
18	Senior Judge	Dana L. Christensen	Missoula	1951	2011–2025	2013–2020	2025–present	Obama
20	Senior Judge	Susan P. Watters	Billings	1958	2013–2026	—	2026–present	Obama

== Former judges ==
#	Judge	Born–died	Active service	Chief Judge	Senior status	Appointed by	Reason for termination
1	Hiram Knowles	1834–1911	1890–1904	—	—	B. Harrison	retirement
2	William Henry Hunt	1857–1949	1904–1910	—	—	T. Roosevelt	elevation
3	Carl L. Rasch	1866–1961	1910–1911	—	—	Taft	resignation
4	George M. Bourquin	1863–1958	1912–1934	—	1934–1958	Taft	death
5	Charles Nelson Pray	1868–1963	1924–1957	1948–1957	1957–1963	Coolidge	death
6	James H. Baldwin	1876–1944	1935–1944	—	—	F. Roosevelt	death
7	R. Lewis Brown	1892–1948	1945–1948	—	—	F. Roosevelt	death
8	William Daniel Murray	1908–1994	1949–1965	1957–1965	1965–1994	Truman	death
9	William James Jameson	1898–1990	1957–1969	1965–1968	1969–1990	Eisenhower	death
10	Russell Evans Smith	1908–1990	1966–1979	1968–1978	1979–1990	L. Johnson	death
11	James F. Battin	1925–1996	1969–1990	1978–1990	1990–1996	Nixon	death
12	Paul G. Hatfield	1928–2000	1979–1996	1990–1996	1996–2000	Carter	death
13	Charles C. Lovell	1929–2023	1985–2000	—	2000–2023	Reagan	death
14	Jack D. Shanstrom	1932–2020	1990–2001	1996–2001	2001–2020	G.H.W. Bush	death
16	Richard F. Cebull	1944–present	2001–2013	2008–2013	2013	G.W. Bush	retirement
17	Sam E. Haddon	1937–2025	2001–2012	—	2012–2025	G.W. Bush	death

== Chief judges ==
Chief judges have administrative responsibilities with respect to their district court. Unlike the Supreme Court, where one justice is specifically nominated to be chief, the office of chief judge rotates among the district court judges. To be chief, a judge must have been in active service on the court for at least one year, be under the age of 65, and have not previously served as chief judge.

A vacancy is filled by the judge highest in seniority among the group of qualified judges. The chief judge serves for a term of seven years, or until age 70, whichever occurs first. The age restrictions are waived if no members of the court would otherwise be qualified for the position.

When the office was created in 1948, the chief judge was the longest-serving judge who had not elected to retire, on what has since 1958 been known as senior status, or declined to serve as chief judge. After August 6, 1959, judges could not become or remain chief after turning 70 years old. The current rules have been in operation since October 1, 1982.

== Succession of seats ==
Seat 1
Seat established on November 8, 1889 by 25 Stat. 676
Knowles	1890–1904
Hunt	1904–1910
Rasch	1910–1911
Bourquin	1912–1934
Baldwin	1935–1944
Brown	1945–1948
Murray	1949–1965
Smith	1966–1979
Hatfield	1979–1996
Molloy	1996–2011
Christensen	2011–2025
Mercer	2025–present

Seat 2
Seat established on September 14, 1922 by 42 Stat. 837 (temporary)
Seat made permanent on May 31, 1938 by 52 Stat. 584
Pray	1924–1957
Jameson	1957–1969
Battin	1969–1990
Shanstrom	1990–2001
Cebull	2001–2013
Watters	2013–2026
Lane	2026–present

Seat 3
Seat established on July 10, 1984 by 98 Stat. 333
Lovell	1985–2000
Haddon	2001–2012
Morris	2013–present

== See also ==
- Courts of Montana
- List of current United States district judges
- List of United States federal courthouses in Montana
- United States Court of Appeals for the Ninth Circuit
