= List of justices of the Montana Supreme Court =

Following is a list of justices of the Montana Supreme Court.

== Current members ==
| Chief Justice | Term began | Term expires | Notes |
|---|---|---|---|
| Cory Swanson | 2025 | 2032 | Elected 2024 |
| Associate Justice | Term began | Term expires | Notes |
| Laurie McKinnon | 2013 | 2028 | Elected 2012 |
| James A. Rice | 2014 | 2030 | Appointed by Governor Judy Martz; elected 2002; re-elected 2006; re-elected 2014; re-elected 2022 |
| Beth Baker | 2011 | 2026 | Elected 2010 |
| Jim Shea | 2017 | 2028 | Appointed by Governor Steve Bullock, 2014; elected 2016 |
| Katherine M. Bidegaray | 2025 | 2032 | Elected 2024 |
| Ingrid Gustafson | 2018 | 2030 | Appointed by Governor Steve Bullock, 2018; elected 2022 |

== Former members ==
=== Chief justices ===
==== Montana Territorial Supreme Court ====
| Chief Justice | Term served | Notes |
|---|---|---|
| Hezekiah L. Hosmer | (1864–1868) | Appointed first chief justice of Territorial Supreme Court by President Lincoln |
| Henry L. Warren | (1868–1871) | Appointed by President Johnson |
| Decius Wade | (1871–1887) | Appointed by President Grant |
| Newton W. McConnell | (1887–1889) | Appointed by President Cleveland; resigned |
| Henry N. Blake | (1889) | Appointed by President Harrison, 1889; previously Associate Justice of Territorial Supreme Court (1875–1885); elected first chief justice of Montana Supreme Court after statehood |

==== Montana Supreme Court ====
| Chief Justice | Term served | Notes |
|---|---|---|
| Henry N. Blake | (1889–1893) | First Chief Justice of Montana Supreme Court; previously Associate Justice of Territorial Supreme Court (1875–1885); Chief Justice of Territorial Supreme Court (1889) |
| William Y. Pemberton | (1893–1899) |
| Theodore M. Brantley | (1899–1922) | Died in office; longest serving Chief Justice to date (23 years) |
| Llewellyn L. Callaway | (1922–1935) | Appointed |
| Walter B. Sands | (1935–1938) | Died in office |
| O. F. Goddard | (1938–1939) | Appointed |
| Howard A. Johnson | (1939–1946) | Resigned |
| Carl Lindquist | (1946) | Appointed |
| Hugh R. Adair | (1947–1956) | Also served as Associate Justice 1943–1946, 1957–1968 |
| James T. Harrison | (1957–1977) | Appointed |
| Paul G. Hatfield | (1977–1978) |
| Frank I. Haswell | (1978–1985) | Appointed |
| Jean A. Turnage | (1985–2000) |
| Karla M. Gray | (2001–2008) | Elected |
| Mike McGrath | (2009–2025) | Elected |
| Cory Swanson | (2025– ) | Elected |

==== Associate justices ====
===== Montana Territorial Supreme Court =====
| Associate Justice | Term served | Notes |
|---|---|---|
| Ammi Giddings | (1864–1865) | Appointed by President Lincoln, but never served; resigned immediately due to ill health, though commission remained in force until 1865 |
| Lorenzo P. Williston | (1864–1868) | Appointed by President Lincoln |
| Lyman E. Munson | (1865–1869) | Appointed by President Lincoln |
| Hiram Knowles | (1868–1879) | Appointed by President Johnson |
| George G. Symes | (1869–1871) | Appointed by President Grant |
| John Luttrell Murphy | (1871–1872) | Appointed by Ulysses S. Grant. Recalled/resigned after much controversy, replaced by Justice Servis. |
| Francis G. Servis | (1872–1875) | Appointed by President Grant |
| Henry N. Blake | (1875–1885) | Appointed by President Grant; subsequently appointed as Chief Justice of Territorial Supreme Court, 1889; elected first chief justice of Supreme Court, 1889–1893 |
| William J. Galbraith | (1879–1888) | Appointed to first term by President Hayes, to subsequent term by President Arthur |
| Everton Conger | (1880–1886) | Appointed by President Hayes |
| John Coburn | (1884–1886) | Appointed by President Hayes |
| Thomas C. Bach | (1886–1889) | Appointed by President Cleveland |
| James H. McLeary | (1886–1888) | Appointed by President Cleveland |
| Stephen DeWolf | (1888–1889) | Appointed by President Cleveland |
| Moses J. Liddell | (1888–1889) | Appointed by President Cleveland |

===== Montana Supreme Court =====
| Associate Justice | Term served | Notes |
|---|---|---|
| William H. DeWitt | (1889–1897) |
| Edgar N. Harwood | (1889–1895) |
| William Henry Hunt | (1895–1900) | Resigned |
| Horace R. Buck | (1897) | Died in office |
| William Trigg Pigott | (1897–1903) | Appointed |
| Robert L. Word | (1900–1901) | Appointed |
| George R. Milburn | (1901–1907) |
| William L. Holloway | (1903–1926) | Died in office |
| Henry C. Smith | (1907–1913) |
| Sydney Sanner | (1913–1918) |
| William Trigg Pigott | (1918) | Appointed; previously served as Associate Justice, 1897–1903 |
| Charles H. Cooper | (1919–1924) | Resigned |
| John Hurly | (1919–1921) |
| George Y. Patten | (1919) | Appointed to newly created seat; resigned |
| John A. Matthews | (1919–1920) | Appointed; subsequently served as Associate Justice, 1925–1937 |
| Roy E. Ayers | (1922) | Appointed to newly created seat, January 1922; resigned November 22, 1922 |
| Albert J. Galen | (1921–1933) |
| Frank B. Reynolds | (1921–1922) | Died in office |
| George W. Farr | (1922–1923) | Appointed |
| Albert P. Stark | (1923–1929) |
| Wellington D. Rankin | (1924–1925) | Appointed |
| John A. Matthews | (1925–1937) | Previously served as Associate Justice, 1919 |
| Warren Toole | (1926–1927) | Appointed |
| Henry L. Myers | (1927–1929) | Appointed |
| Albert H. Angstman | (1929–1934) | Subsequently served as Associate Justice 1937–1942, 1945–1961 for a total of 28 years |
| Sam C. Ford | (1929–1933) | Subsequently, Governor of Montana, 1941 to 1949 |
| Ralph J. Anderson | (1933–1939) |
| Sam V. Stewart | (1933–1939) | Previously Governor of Montana, 1913–1921; State Representative, 1931–1933; died in office, 1939 |
| Claude F. Morris | (1935–1947) |
| Albert H. Angstman | (1937–1942) | Previously served as Associate Justice, 1929–1934; subsequently served 1945–1961 |
| Ralph L. Arnold | (1939–1941) | Appointed |
| Leif Erickson | (1939–1945) |
| Albert Anderson | (1941–1945) |
| Hugh R. Adair | (1943–1946) | Subsequently served as Chief Justice, 1947–1956, and again as Associate Justice 1957 – 1968 |
| Albert H. Angstman | (1945–1961) | Previously served as Associate Justice, 1929–1934, and 1945–1961 |
| Edwin K. Cheadle | (1945–1947) | Resigned |
| I. W. Choate | (1947–1949) | Appointed |
| Fred L. Gibson | (1947–1948) | Appointed |
| Lee Metcalf | (1947–1953) | Subsequently, U.S. Representative, 1953–1961; U.S. Senator, 1961–1978 |
| R. V. Bottomly | (1949–1961) |
| Harrison J. Freebourn | (1949–1954) |
| Forrest H. Anderson | (1953–1956) | Subsequently served as Governor of Montana, 1969–1973 |
| Horace S. Davis | (1954–1957) | Appointed |
| Hugh R. Adair | (1957–1968) | Previously served as Associate Justice, 1943–1946 and as Chief Justice, 1947–1956 |
| Wesley Castles | (1957–1977) | Appointed |
| Stanley M. Doyle | (1961–1967) | Appointed; resigned |
| John C. Harrison | (1961–1994) | Longest serving justice in history of the court |
| Frank I. Haswell | (1967–1978) | Appointed; subsequently served as Chief Justice, 1978–1985 |
| John W. Bonner | (1969–1970) | Previously Governor of Montana, 1949 to 1953; Died in office, 1970 |
| Gene B. Daly | (1970–1983) | Appointed, reelected |
| Daniel J. Shea | (1977–1985) |
| John C. Sheehy | (1978–1991) | Appointed |
| Frank B. Morrison | (1981–1987) | Resigned |
| Fred J. Weber | (1981–1995) |
| L. C. Gulbrandson | (1983–1989) |
| William E. Hunt | (1985–2000) |
| R. C. McDonough | (1987–1993) |
| Diane Barz | (1989–1990) | First woman to serve on the court; resigned |
| Terry N. Trieweiler | (1991–2003) |
| Karla M. Gray | (1991–2000) | Subsequently served as Chief Justice, 2000 to 2008 |
| Charles E. Erdmann | (1995–1997) |
| Jim Regnier | (1997–2004) |
| John Warner | (2003–2009) |
| W. William Leaphart | (1995–2010) | Elected 1994; re-elected 2002 |
| James C. Nelson | (1993–2012) | Appointed by Governor Marc Racicot; elected 1994; re-elected 1996, 2004 |
| Brian Matthew Morris | (2005–2013) | Elected 2004; re-elected 2012 |
| Patricia O'Brien Cotter | (2001–2016) | Elected 2000; re-elected 2008 |
| Mike Wheat | (2010–2017) | Elected in 2010; re-elected 2014 |
| Dirk Sandefur | (2017–2025) | Elected in 2016 |
