= Henry Warren =

Henry Warren may refer to:

- Henry Warren (general) (born 1922), United States Air Force general
- Henry Clarke Warren (1854–1899), American scholar of Sanskrit and Pali
- Henry E. Warren (1872–1957), American inventor
- Henry L. Warren (1837–1900), American lawyer and chief justice of the Territorial Montana Supreme Court
- Henry S. Warren Jr., American engineer and author of the book Hacker's Delight
- Henry Waterman Warren (1838–1919), American politician who served in the state legislatures of Mississippi and Massachusetts
- Henry White Warren (1831–1912), American Methodist Episcopal bishop and author

== See also ==
- Harry Warren (disambiguation)
- Warren (surname)
