= 2026 Montana Supreme Court election =

- November 3, 2026
Candidate	Amy Eddy	Dan Wilson
Party	Nonpartisan	Nonpartisan
Popular vote	275,688	188,409
Percentage	59.40%	40.60%
- Eddy: 50–60% 60–70% 70–80% Wilson: 50–60% 60–70% 70–80% Tie: 50%
Associate justice before election
Beth Baker
Elected Associate justice
Amy Eddy

The 2026 Montana Supreme Court election was held on November 3, 2026, to elect one justice to the Montana Supreme Court. The primary election was held on June 2, 2026. Incumbent judge Beth Baker is retiring after serving two terms on the court. As only two candidates qualified to run, both advanced to the general election as the top two candidates in the primary. Flathead County district court judge Amy Eddy was elected with 59.40 percent of the vote over her colleague Dan Wilson, who was endorsed by the state Republican party.

== Primary election ==
=== Candidates ===
==== Advanced to general election ====
- Amy Eddy, Flathead County district court judge
- Dan Wilson, Flathead County district court judge and candidate for supreme court in 2024

==== Declined ====
- Beth Baker, incumbent judge

=== Results ===
Unofficial primary results by county: Eddy: 50–60%; 60–70%; 70–80%; Wilson: 50–60%; 60–70%; 70–80%

Unofficial primary results by congressional district: Eddy: 50–60%; Wilson: 50–60%

Nonpartisan primary
Candidate	Votes	%
Amy Eddy	140,131	51.40
Dan Wilson	132,503	48.60
Total votes	272,634	100.00

== General election ==
=== Campaign ===
Eddy has stated that she intends to run her campaign in a nonpartisan manner. She criticized a recently passed law that legalized direct financial contributions from political parties to judicial candidates. In contrast, her opponent Dan Wilson headlined a Montana Republican Party event, positioning himself as a conservative candidate.

=== Endorsements ===
Amy Eddy

Organizations

- Montana Conservation Voters
Dan Wilson

State legislators

- Art Wittich, chair of the Montana Republican Party (2025–present), former state representative from the 68th district (2015–2017), and former state senator from the 35th district (2011–2015)

Political parties

- Montana Republican Party

=== Results ===
2026 Montana Supreme Court election
Candidate	Votes	%
Amy Eddy		
Dan Wilson		
Total votes		100.00
