= Leaphart =

Leaphart is a surname. Notable people with the surname include:

- Keith Leaphart (born 1975), American entrepreneur, philanthropist, and physician
- Paulette Leaphart (born 1966), American breast cancer survivor and activist
- W. William Leaphart (born 1946), American jurist from Montana
