= Justice Anderson =

Justice Anderson may refer to:

- Albert Anderson (Montana judge) (1876–1948), associate justice of the Montana Supreme Court
- Alexander O. Anderson (1794–1869), Tennessee lawyer who served in the United States Senate, and as a judge on the California Supreme Court from 1851 to 1853
- Barry Anderson (born 1954), associate justice of the Minnesota Supreme Court
- Donald B. Anderson (1904–1956), associate justice of the Idaho Supreme Court
- E. Riley Anderson (1932–2018), former chief justice of the Tennessee Supreme Court
- Forrest H. Anderson (1913–1989), associate justice of the Montana Supreme Court from 1953 to 1956
- Francis T. Anderson (1808–1887), judge on the Virginia Supreme Court of Appeals from 1870 to 1883
- Frank Anderson (judge) (1870–1931), associate justice of the South Dakota Supreme Court
- George Campbell Anderson (1805–1884), chief justice of the Bahamas, chief justice of Ceylon, and chief justice of the Leeward Islands
- John C. Anderson (judge) (1863–1940), associate justice and chief justice of the Alabama Supreme Court
- John W. Anderson (Iowa judge) (1871–1954), associate justice of the Iowa Supreme Court
- Paul Anderson (judge) (born 1943), associate justice of the Minnesota Supreme Court
- Ralph J. Anderson (1888–1962), associate justice of the Montana Supreme Court
- Reuben V. Anderson (born 1943), associate justice of the Supreme Court of Mississippi
- Thomas H. Anderson (judge) (1848–1916), associate justice of the Supreme Court of the District of Columbia
- Thomas J. Anderson (judge) (1837–1910), associate justice of the Territorial Utah Supreme Court
- Russell A. Anderson (1942–2020), the 20th chief justice of the Minnesota Supreme Court
- Walker Anderson (1801–1857), associate justice of the Florida Supreme Court from 1851 to 1853
- William Dozier Anderson (1862–1952), associate justice of the Supreme Court of Mississippi

== See also ==
- James A. Andersen (1924–2022), associate justice of the Washington Supreme Court
- Judge Anderson, fictional character in Judge Dredd comic books
- Judge Anderson (disambiguation)
