= John A. Matthews =

American judge (1876–1966)

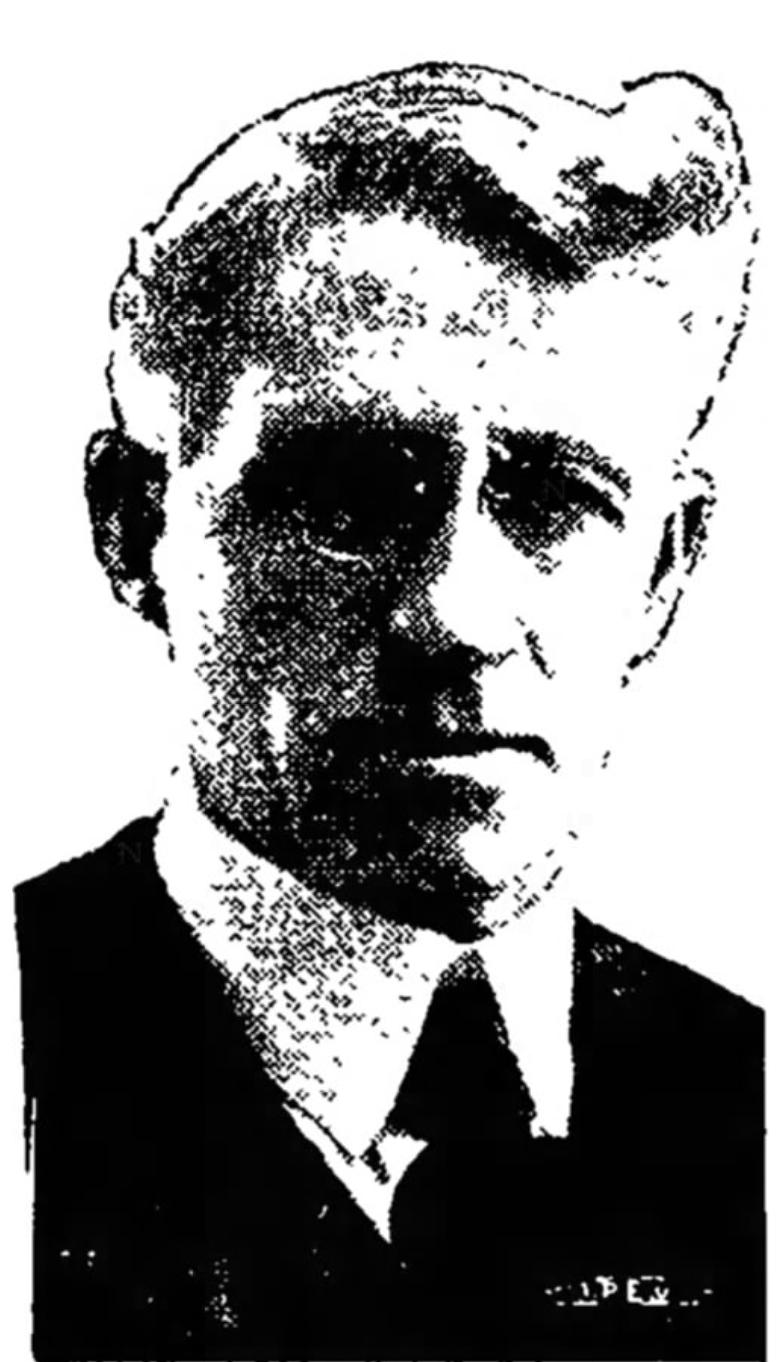
John A. Matthews in 1924.

John A. Matthews (February 1, 1876 – August 30, 1966) was a justice of the Montana Supreme Court from 1919 to 1920, and again from 1925 to 1937.

== Early life, education, and career ==
Born in Mankato, Minnesota, Matthews was brought to Montana as an infant. He attended high school in Helena, Montana, graduating as valedictorian of his class, and making a valedictory speech calling for the abolition of capital punishment in the state. The speech so impressed U.S. District Court Judge Charles Nelson Pray and others that they persuaded Matthews' grandfather to send him to law school. Matthews received a law degree from the University of Michigan in 1899. After briefly practicing in Helena, Montana, he was elected County Attorney for Broadwater County, Montana, serving in that position from 1902 to 1913.

== Judicial service ==
In 1913, Matthews became a state district court judge, serving as the first judge of the newly-created 14th Judicial District, from 1913 to 1916.

Matthews ran unsuccessfully as a Democrat for a seat on the state supreme court in 1918, losing to Charles H. Cooper by a few hundred votes out of nearly 90,000 votes cast, but in December 1919, Governor Sam V. Stewart appointed him to a seat vacated by the retirement of George Y. Patten. The following year, Matthews was soundly defeated for reelection by Frank B. Reynolds. Matthews was elected to the court in 1924, and reelected in 1930. In 1933, Montana Senator Thomas J. Walsh, tapped to be the next Attorney General by Franklin D. Roosevelt, planned to seek a federal judicial appointment for Matthews, but Walsh died before being sworn into office, and the appointment never materialized. Matthews was defeated in a bid for a third term in 1936, losing to challenger Albert H. Angstman by 3,520 votes out of over 230,000 votes cast. In March 1937, Governor Roy E. Ayers appointed Matthews as counsel to the State Board of Equalization, with which Matthews was affiliated as counsel and, from 1939 on, as a board member, until his retirement in 1946. During this service, Matthews again ran for a seat on the court in 1944, losing to Edwin K. Cheadle by fewer than a thousand votes out of over 160,000 cast.

== Personal life and death ==
Matthews met Mabel Robbins of Helena while the two were in high school together, and married her on November 8, 1899, a few months after his graduation from law school. They had two sons and three daughters, and were married for 64 years, until Mabel's death in March 1963.

Matthews died in St. John's Hospital in Helena at the age of 90, following a nine-month illness.

Political offices
Preceded by George Y. Patten; Wellington D. Rankin	Justice of the Montana Supreme Court; 1919–1920; 1925–1937	Succeeded by Frank B. Reynolds; Albert H. Angstman
