= Justice Adair =

Justice Adair may refer to:

- Hugh R. Adair (1889–1971), chief justice of the Montana Supreme Court
- James Adair (serjeant-at-law) (c. 1743–1798), chief justice of Chester
