= Justice Pigott =

Justice Pigott may refer to:

- Eugene F. Pigott Jr. (born 1946), judge of the New York Court of Appeals
- William Trigg Pigott (1860–1944), associate justice of the Montana Supreme Court
