= Justice Harwood =

Justice Harwood may refer to:

- Edgar N. Harwood (1854–1936), associate justice of the Montana Supreme Court
- R. Bernard Harwood Jr. (born 1939), associate justice of the Alabama Supreme Court
- Robert B. Harwood (1902–1991), associate justice of the Alabama Supreme Court
