= Horace S. Davis =

American judge (1892–1967)

Horace S. Davis (October 22, 1892 – May 18, 1967) was an appointed Justice of the Montana Supreme Court, serving from 1954 to 1957.

Born in Worcester, Massachusetts, Davis attended Massachusetts schools. When he came to Montana, Justice Davis entered the University of Montana, Missoula and finished his undergraduate work at Montana State University, Bozeman. His legal training was secured at the University of Chicago where he earned his JD. He was admitted to the Montana Bar in 1917, just prior to his enlistment in the U.S. Army. His service with the American Expeditionary Forces in France and in Germany lasted throughout World War I and for many months thereafter. When he completed his military duties, Davis established a law practice in Big Timber, Montana. He was then elected County Attorney of Sweet Grass County, Montana, and served three terms.

In 1926, he moved to Billings, Montana, and practiced law there, until his appointment by Governor J. Hugo Aronson to fill the seat of the late Justice Harrison J. Freebourn. Davis served as Associate Justice of the Montana Supreme Court from December 21, 1954, to January 7, 1957. He died in Billings at the age of 75.

Political offices
Preceded by Harrison J. Freebourn	Justice of the Montana Supreme Court; 1954–1957	Succeeded by Hugh R. Adair
