= John Sheehy =

John Sheehy may refer to:

- John Sheehy (administrator) (1889–1949), British colonial official
- John Sheehy (architect) (born 1942), American architect
- John C. Sheehy (1918–2017), justice of the Montana Supreme Court
- John Joe Sheehy (1897–1980), Irish political/military activist and sportsperson
- John R. Sheehy (born 1947), member of the Illinois House of Representatives
