= Frank Reynolds (disambiguation) =

Frank Reynolds (1923–1983) was an American news anchor and journalist for ABC News.

Frank Reynolds may also refer to:

- Frank Reynolds (academic), emeritus professor of history of religions and Buddhist studies, University of Chicago Divinity School
- Frank Reynolds (artist) (1876–1953), British artist
- Frank Reynolds (field hockey) (1917–2001), British Olympic field hockey player
- Frank Reynolds (editor), film editor on Praying with Anger
- Frank B. Reynolds (1874–1922), Justice of the Montana Supreme Court
- Frank Reynolds (It's Always Sunny in Philadelphia), a fictional character on It's Always Sunny In Philadelphia
