= Justice Patten =

Justice Patten may refer to:

- George Y. Patten (1876–1951), associate justice of the Montana Supreme Court
- Nicholas Patten (born 1950), member of the Court of Appeal of England and Wales
