= Francis G. Servis =

American judge (1826–1877)

Francis G. Servis (August 1, 1826 – March 6, 1877) was a justice of the Territorial Montana Supreme Court from 1873 to 1875, appointed by President Ulysses S. Grant.

Born in Hunterdon County, New Jersey, Servis began reading law in the office of Colonel J. B. Lewis and completed it in the office of Wilson & Church. He was admitted to the Ohio Bar in 1853. While studying the law, Servis became the Clerk of the Probate Judge's office. He was elected and re-elected as Prosecuting Attorney of Mahoning County, Ohio.

On January 13, 1873, President Grant nominated Servis to seat on the Territorial Montana Supreme Court, to a seat vacated by Judge John Luttrell Murphy (who, according to differing accounts, had either resigned or been recalled from the seat). He served until 1875, when he retired and moved back to Ohio. In 1876, he was elected to as a circuit judge in Ohio. Servis died at the age of 50.

Political offices
Preceded by John Luttrell Murphy	Justice of the Montana Supreme Court; 1873–1875	Succeeded by Henry N. Blake
