= O. F. Goddard =

American judge (1853–1943)

O. F. Goddard (January 20, 1853 – September 25, 1943) was a justice of the Montana Supreme Court from 1938 to 1939.

Born in Troy, Iowa, Goddard attended the Troy Academy, and then read law under the supervision of his uncle, a local judge. Initially named Fletcher Goddard, he added the "O." himself because "he wanted another initial, so more or less at random took O".

Goddard entered the practice of law in Billings, Montana in 1883. He served in the Montana Senate, and was a district judge from October 1, 1924, to January 4, 1937, before being elected Chief Justice of the Montana Supreme Court. He retired in 1939.

Goddard died in his home at the age of 90.

Political offices
Preceded by Walter B. Sands	Justice of the Montana Supreme Court; 1938–1939	Succeeded by Howard A. Johnson
