= Justice Eddy =

Justice Eddy may refer to:

- Amy Eddy, associate justice-elect of the Montana Supreme Court
- Samuel Eddy, associate justice of the Rhode Island Supreme Court
