= General Warren =

General Warren may refer to:

- Charles Warren (1840–1927), British Army general
- Fitz Henry Warren (1816–1878), Union Army brevet major general
- George Warren (East India Company officer) (c. 1801–1884), British Army general
- Gouverneur K. Warren (1830–1882), Union Army major general
- Henry Warren (general) (born 1922), U.S. Air Force major general
- James Warren (politician) (1726–1808), Massachusetts Militia major general in the American Revolutionary War
- Joseph Warren (1741–1775), Massachusetts Militia major general in the American Revolutionary War
- Robert H. Warren (1917–2010), U.S. Air Force lieutenant general

== See also ==
- Attorney General Warren (disambiguation)
