= Carl Lindquist (judge) =

American Chief Justice (1899–1976)

Carl Lindquist (March 7, 1899 – June 3, 1976) was an American lawyer and state senator. He was chief justice of the Montana Supreme Court in 1946. He was appointed after his predecessor Howard A. Johnson resigned. A Republican, he was elected to the Montana State Senate from Daniels County.

Lindquist was born on March 7, 1899, in Paynesville, Minnesota. He died on June 3, 1976, in Scobey, Montana at the age of 77.

== See also ==
- List of justices of the Montana Supreme Court

Political offices
| Preceded by Howard A. Johnson | Chief Justice of the Montana Supreme Court; 1946 | Succeeded by Hugh R. Adair |
