= Justice Sheehy =

Justice Sheehy may refer to:

- John C. Sheehy (1918–2017), associate justice of the Montana Supreme Court
- Joseph Aloysius Sheehy (1900–1971), justice and chief justice of the Supreme Court of Queensland

== See also ==
- Joseph Warren Sheehy (1910–1967), United States district judge
