= George W. Farr =

American judge (1875–1957)

George Wilbur Farr (July 6, 1875 – March 28, 1957) was an appointed Justice of the Montana Supreme Court, serving from 1922 to 1923.

Born in Hamilton County, Nebraska, Farr received his law degree from the University of Nebraska College of Law in 1896. Farr came to Montana in 1896 and settled in Miles City, Montana, establishing his law practice. He served as Mayor of Miles City from May 3, 1909 to May 2, 1911 and served as president of the Montana Bar Association. On May 24, 1922, Governor J. Hugo Aronson appointed Farr to a seat on the Montana Supreme Court vacated by the death of Justice Frank B. Reynolds. After completing his term on the court, Farr returned to Miles City where he died at the age of 81.

Political offices
Preceded by Frank B. Reynolds	Justice of the Montana Supreme Court; 1922–1923	Succeeded by Albert P. Stark
