= Claude F. Morris =

American judge (1869–1957)

Claude F. Morris (January 10, 1869 – September 28, 1957) was a justice of the Montana Supreme Court from 1935 to 1946.

Born in Ralls County, Missouri, Morris received his Bachelor of Laws degree from Columbian University (later George Washington University) in 1902. He moved to Montana and was admitted to the practice of law in 1903. From 1903 to 1906, he was associated with the Union Bank and Trust Company as secretary and trust officer. He was prominent in Montana banking circles for many year, particularly at Havre, Montana, where he was the president of the Security State Bank.

Morris served on the Havre City Council from 1912 to 1916; from 1914 to 1916 served in the Montana House of Representatives; and from 1916 to 1920 in the Montana State Senate. He served as Assistant Attorney General from 1932 until his election to the Montana Supreme Court in 1934. Morris remained on the court until 1946, when he unsuccessfully ran for chief justice.

Morris died at the age of 88.

Political offices
Preceded by Albert H. Angstman	Justice of the Montana Supreme Court; 1935–1946	Succeeded by Lee Metcalf
