= Walter B. Sands =

American judge (1870–1938)

Walter B. Sands (January 28, 1870 – June 13, 1938) was chief justice of the Montana Supreme Court from 1935 until his death in 1938.

Born in Maiden Rock, Wisconsin, Sands moved to Harlem, Montana, with his father as a child. Sands received his law degree from the University of Minnesota in 1894. He came to Montana in the fall of 1894 and was admitted to the Montana Bar in January 1895. He immediately began the practice of law in Chinook, Montana, and was active until his election as chief justice of the Supreme Court in 1934. He assumed office in 1935, and served as chief justice until his death at the age of 68. During the election campaign, he pledged to accept only $6,000 of the $7,500 salary for the office, which Helena attorney W. D. Tipton asserted was a bribe. Tipton sued, and the state supreme court ultimately held that the promise was a violation of the state's corrupt practices act, but unactionable due to Sands' good faith in making the campaign promise.

In 1895, Sands married Illinois native Mary Cook, with whom he had several children. Sands died from injuries following an accident in which he was hit by a bus that was backing up at an intersection, in Helena, Montana. His hip was shattered in the accident, and he died several days later.

Political offices
Preceded by Llewellyn L. Callaway	Chief Justice of the Montana Supreme Court; 1935–1938	Succeeded by O. F. Goddard
