= William Y. Pemberton =

American judge (1841–1922)

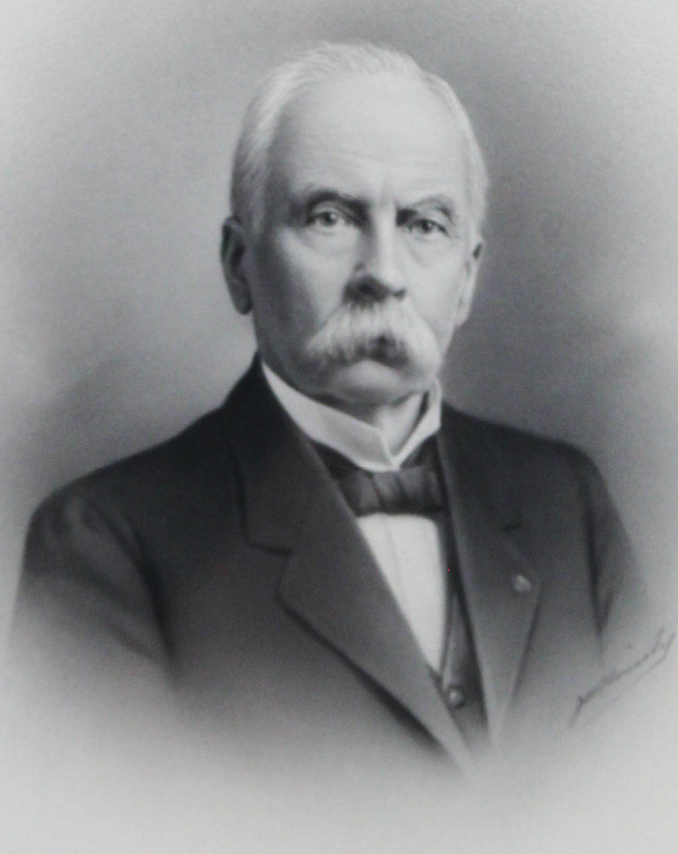
Former Chief Justice William Y. Pemberton in 1913.

William Y. Pemberton (June 1, 1841 (1843 in some sources) – August 26, 1922) was the chief justice of the Montana Supreme Court from 1893 until 1899, succeeding Judge Henry N. Blake.

== Early life, education, and career ==
Born in Nashville, Tennessee, Pemberton was raised in Missouri. He attended the public schools, and the Masonic College at Lexington, Missouri before studying law at Cumberland University in Lebanon, Tennessee. Pemberton came to Virginia City, Montana in 1863, at the age of 22. He was "an active participant in the heroic efforts of the citizens of Virginia City to quench the spirit of fierce, murderous lawlessness that terrorized the mining camp".

In 1863, he was a stenographer at the trial of stagecoach robber George Ives. Pemberton was impressed with the performance of prosecution attorney William Fisk Sanders, the summation of which Pemberton would later remember as the most powerful that he ever heard.

== Judicial service and later life ==
Pemberton became a judge in Silver Bow, Montana in 1891, and the following year was nominated to be chief judge of the state supreme court by the Democrat and Peoples parties. He was elected Chief Justice of the Montana Supreme Court, serving in that capacity until 1899. He then returned to the practice of law, and in 1909 became librarian of the state historical society (Montana Historical Society), remaining that position until 1920, when infirmity compelled his retirement. He was the state's second chief justice, although there were several during the territorial period.

He died at Excelsior Springs, Missouri outside Kansas City after two years of illness.

== See also ==
- List of justices of the Montana Supreme Court

Political offices
Preceded by Henry N. Blake	Justice of the Montana Supreme Court; 1893–1899	Succeeded by Theodore M. Brantley
