= Attorney General Warren =

Attorney General Warren may refer to:

- Earl Warren (1891–1974), Attorney General of California
- Robert W. Warren (1925–1998), Attorney General of Wisconsin

== See also ==
- General Warren (disambiguation)
