= Harry Warren (disambiguation) =

Harry Warren (1893–1981) was an American composer and lyricist.

Harry Warren may also refer to:

- Harry Warren (footballer), British footballer and football manager
- Harry J. Warren (born 1950), North Carolina representative (Republican)
- Harry Marsh Warren (1861–1940), American Baptist minister

== See also ==
- Henry Warren (disambiguation)
- Harold Warren (born 1960), an American professional boxer
- Harold P. Warren, businessman and filmmaker, director of Manos: The Hands of Fate
- Warren Harry (1953–2008), British songwriter and performer
