= Albert J. Galen =

American judge (1876–1936)

Albert John Galen (January 16, 1876 – May 16, 1936) was the Montana Attorney General from 1905 to 1913, and a justice of the Montana Supreme Court from 1921 to 1933.

Born in Crow Creek Valley, Jefferson, (now Broadwater) County, Montana Territory. He attended the University of Notre Dame for three years and completed his law courses at the University of Michigan in June 1897. Galen engaged in the private practice of law in Helena, Montana, until 1904 at which time he was elected Montana Attorney General and served in that capacity from January 2, 1905 to January 6, 1913. During World War I, he served as Judge Advocate of the American Expeditionary Forces in Siberia until the close of the war. Galen was awarded the Distinguished Service Metal. At the completion of his military service, he returned to Helena and practiced law until his election to the Montana Supreme Court in 1920. He served on the Court through 1933. In 1930, he ran unsuccessfully for a seat in the United States Senate, winning the Republican nomination but losing the general election to incumbent Thomas J. Walsh.

Galen died at the age of 60.

Political offices
Preceded by John Hurly	Justice of the Montana Supreme Court; 1921–1933	Succeeded by Sam V. Stewart
