= Howard A. Johnson =

American judge (1893–1974)

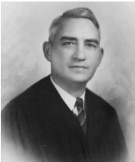
Image of Howard A. Johnson

Howard A. Johnson (1893 – June 8, 1974) was an American politician and jurist. He was chief justice of the Montana Supreme Court, serving on the court from 1939 to 1946.

Born in Beloit, Wisconsin, Johnson was raised in Illinois and attended college there. He attended the University of Montana Law School from 1915 to 1917. He was a pilot in World War I, receiving training in Texas and France. He was injured in a crash in France, resulting in a year of hospitalization, and he was decorated by the French and American governments. After the war, he entered the practice of law in Whitehall, Montana. He was elected to represent Silver Bow, Montana in the Montana Legislature as a Republican in 1921. He served as the County Attorney for Jefferson County, Montana in the 1920s, and as an assistant United States Attorney in 1930.

In 1939, Johnson was elected to fill the unexpired term of O. F. Goddard. He was then reelected to a full term, from which he retired in 1946 to resume the practice of law. He retired in 1972, moving to San Leandro, California, where he died at the age of 80.

== See also ==
- List of justices of the Montana Supreme Court

Political offices
Preceded by O. F. Goddard	Justice of the Montana Supreme Court; 1939–1946	Succeeded by Carl Lindquist
