= Newton W. McConnell =

American judge (1832–1915)

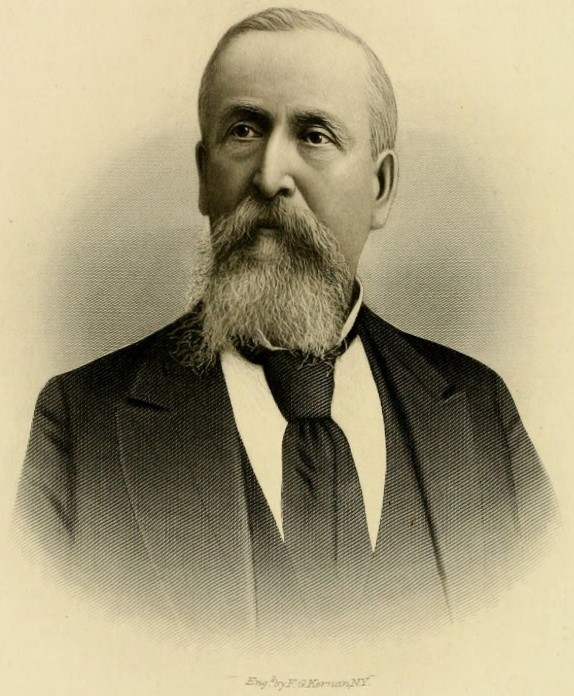
Newton W. McConnell

Newton Whitfield McConnell (May 22, 1832 – December 22, 1915) was chief justice of the Territorial Montana Supreme Court, appointed by President Grover Cleveland, serving from 1887 to 1889.

Born near Mooresville in Marshall County, Tennessee, McConnell attended Allegheny College in Pennsylvania from 1853 to 1855. After graduating, he taught for a short time and then began reading the law in preparation for the Bar. McConnell served in the Confederate Tennessee Cavalry during the American Civil War, retiring as a captain. He was admitted to the Tennessee Bar in 1867 after the war and began to practice law in Hartsville, Tennessee.

McConnell served in the Tennessee Senate as a Democrat for one term from 1873 to 1875. In 1874, he was an unsuccessful candidate for the U.S. Congress, losing the Democratic nomination to Samuel McClary Fite. McConnell then succeeded Judge Fite as a Tennessee circuit judge, serving for eleven years from 1875 to 1886. While serving in that capacity, he was conferred an honorary LL.D. degree by the University of Nashville.

In 1887, President Grover Cleveland appointed him Chief Justice of the Montana Territorial Supreme Court, in which position he remained until 1889, when President Benjamin Harrison appointed Henry N. Blake to succeed him. McConnell then resumed private law practice in Helena, Montana.

He married Nancy Elizabeth McCall on February 26, 1856, and they had three children. In 1903, McConnell retired to Seattle, Washington. He died in Topeka, Kansas, at the age of 83, but was buried in Helena, Montana.

Political offices
Preceded by Decius Wade	Chief Justice of the Montana Territorial Supreme Court; 1887–1889	Succeeded by Henry N. Blake
