= Charles H. Cooper =

American judge (1856–1946)

Charles Henry Cooper (September 15, 1865 – September 17, 1946) was a British-American justice of the Montana Supreme Court from 1919 to 1924.

== Early life ==
Born in Houghton Regis, England, he came to the United States in 1883 with his brother Walter. They moved to Wisconsin in 1884 and finally to Helena, Montana, in 1885. Cooper passed the bar examination in 1892, and entered the practice of law in the state.

== Career ==
In 1906, Cooper purchased the 600-acre (240 ha) Seven-Bar-Nine cattle ranch, about 50 miles (80 km) north of Helena near Craig, Montana.

In 1918, Cooper ran as a Republican against John A. Matthews for a seat on the state supreme court, winning by a few hundred votes out of nearly 90,000 votes cast. He took his seat on the court 1919 and resigned on August 30, 1924.

== Personal life ==
Cooper married Alice Louise Brazier of Gillingham, England, on March 24, 1894, with whom he had two sons, Arthur and Frank. After he retired from the Supreme Court in 1924, Cooper and his wife moved to California to manage several estates left to him in a will. His son Frank soon followed him and became an actor in Hollywood. To distinguish himself from other actors named "Frank Cooper", Frank changed his name to Gary Cooper and achieved great fame.

During World War II, Cooper often read Shakespeare to hospitalized soldiers. He died in Los Angeles, California, two days after his 81st birthday.

Political offices
Preceded by Court reconfigured	Justice of the Montana Supreme Court; 1919–1924	Succeeded by Wellington D. Rankin
