= Henry L. Warren =

American judge (1837–1900)

Henry L. Warren (August 21, 1837 – June 22, 1900) was chief justice of the Territorial Montana Supreme Court, appointed by President Andrew Johnson and serving from 1868 to 1871.

Born in Quincy, Illinois, Warren attended Brown University in Rhode Island and the United States Naval Academy in Annapolis, but resigned at the close of his second year as a cadet midshipman to turn his attention to the study of law. He studied in his father's law office, and was admitted to the Bar in Missouri in 1858. During the American Civil War, Warren returned to Quincy and served as city attorney, and was elected to the Illinois General Assembly. In 1865, President Andrew Johnson appointed him as the second Chief Justice of the Montana Territorial Supreme Court, replacing Justice Hezekiah L. Hosmer. Warren served the Supreme Court for four years before retiring. He then returned to Quincy for several years, then moved to St. Louis, Missouri, and Leadville, Colorado, finally moving to Santa Fe, New Mexico.

In 1858, Warren married Mary L. Warren (a distant relative), with whom he had four children, of whom three predeceased him. Warren and died in Albuquerque, New Mexico, at age 63, after ingering illness.

Political offices
Preceded by Hezekiah L. Hosmer	Chief Justice of the Montana Supreme Court; 1868–1871	Succeeded by Decius Wade
