= Stephen DeWolf =

American judge (1833–1907)

Stephen Armstrong DeWolf (March 1833 – October 27, 1907) was an American lawyer, politician, and judge who served as a justice of the Territorial Montana Supreme Court, appointed by President Grover Cleveland and serving from 1888 to 1889.

== Early life, education, and career ==
Born in Hawkins County, Tennessee, DeWolf studied at the Pennsylvania University at Gettysburg, and the Jefferson College in Cannonsburg. He entered law studies at Lexington, Missouri, and graduated from Lebanon Law School of Cumberland University in 1857. In 1859, after briefly practicing law in Lexington, he moved to Salt Lake City, Utah, as agent and attorney for army contractors Russell, Magors & Waddle.

Subsequently, he accepted the editorial management of the Valley Tan newspaper, and while holding this position wrote the first account of the Mountain Meadow Massacre. This article "created so much hostility in Mormon circles, that a delegation of saints waited on him, demanding a retraction". He refused, and reportedly "was warned to leave Salt Lake without further notice". His office was destroyed by a mob in his absence.

== Political and judicial career ==
After living in Salt Lake City for five years, DeWolf moved to California where he engaged in the livestock business for three years before returning to Salt Lake City in 1867, having been appointed to serve as the United States Attorney for the District of Utah. In 1879 he settled at Butte, Montana, and opened a law office. He was elected to the Twelfth Montana Legislative Assembly from Deer Lodge County, Montana, in 1881, and ran for the Territorial Council on the Democratic ticket at the following election, but was defeated by eleven votes. In 1884, he succeeded in a bid to be elected to the Fourteenth Legislative Council. DeWolfe served as the Butte City Attorney from 1886 to 1888 and was appointed an associate justice of the Montana Territorial Supreme Court by President Cleveland in 1888.

== Personal life and death ==
DeWolf never married, but lived with his sister his entire life. He died in Denver, Colorado, at the age of 74.

Political offices
Preceded by William J. Galbraith	Justice of the Montana Supreme Court; 1888–1889	Succeeded by Court abolished
