= Llewellyn L. Callaway =

American judge (1868–1951)

Llewellyn Link Callaway (December 15, 1868 – August 6, 1951) was chief justice of the Montana Supreme Court from 1922 to 1935.

== Early life, education, and career ==
Born in Tuscola, Illinois, Callaway moved with his family to Virginia City, Montana Territory, in March 1871, his father, James E. Callaway, having been appointed Secretary of the Territory of Montana by President Ulysses S. Grant. Callaway was sent to attend West Rugby Academy and Hamilton Preparatory School in Philadelphia from 1884 to 1885. In the fall of 1886, he entered the University of Michigan, but a devastating winter forced him to return to Madison County to help his father's ranch. Callaway returned to the University of Michigan in the fall of 1889 and received his LL.B. in 1891.

Callaway returned to Montana to practice law in White Sulphur Springs, Montana, from 1891 to 1894, when he moved back to Virginia City. He was elected as Madison County Attorney "by a large majority", serving from 1894 to 1898. He was elected Mayor of Virginia City in 1900, serving for three terms. He became well regarded as a specialist in Montana water rights litigation.

== Judicial service ==
In 1903, Callaway was chosen by the justices of the state to join the Montana Supreme Court Commission, and in 1904, he was elected District Judge for the 5th Judicial District and so resigned the Court Commission in 1905. He served as a district judge for the Montana Fifth Judicial District from 1905 to 1913. He was appointed to chair the Montana Conservation Commission from 1908 to 1909. Callaway next moved to Great Falls, Montana, in 1913. In 1922, he was appointed by Governor Joseph M. Dixon to become the next chief justice of the Montana Supreme Court after the death of Chief Justice Brantly, served thereafter until his retirement in 1935.

== Personal life and death ==
On December 12, 1894, Callaway married Ellen N. Badger, with whom he had two sons and three daughters.

Callaway died on in Helena, Montana, at the age of 83.

Political offices
Preceded by Theodore M. Brantley	Chief Justice of the Montana Supreme Court; 1922–1935	Succeeded by Walter B. Sands
