= Horace R. Buck =

American judge (1853–1897)

Horace Riverside Buck
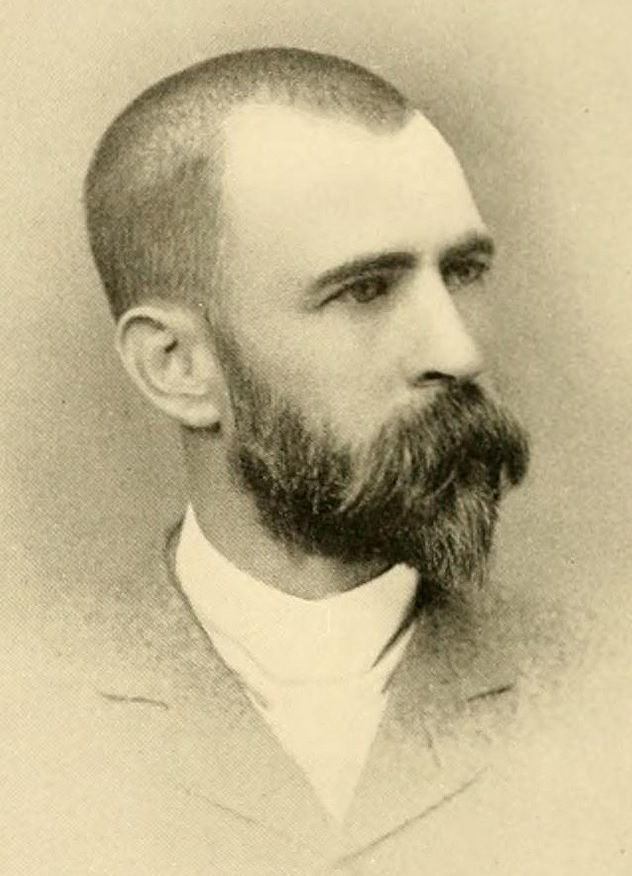

Justice of the Montana Supreme Court
- In office 1897–1897
- Preceded by: William H. DeWitt
- Succeeded by: William Trigg Pigott

Personal details
- Born: September 18, 1853 Yazoo County, Mississippi, U.S.
- Died: December 6, 1897 (aged 44) Lewis and Clark County, Montana, U.S.
- Cause of death: Gunshot wound

Horace Riverside Buck (September 18, 1853 – December 6, 1897) was a justice of the Montana Supreme Court in 1897, having died in office the same year that he joined the court.

== Early life and education ==
Born in Yazoo County, Mississippi, to Charles L. and Maria I. Buck. His father was "one of the most eminent jurists and advocates of his state", and one of the few prominent Mississippians to publicly oppose secession during the American Civil War, and his mother was a well-regarded author. Buck's father died in Vicksburg, Mississippi, in 1862, and the family remained in that city during the 47 day siege that ran from May 18, 1863, to July 4, 1863. During this time, the family had to live in the cellar of the house to escape the risk of Union bombardment. After the war ended, the family moved to Bayou Teche area in St. Mary Parish, Louisiana, and then in 1869 to join relatives living outside Sedalia, Missouri.

Buck moved to New Haven, Connecticut, to attend Hopkins Grammar School in order to gain admission to Yale College. He graduated from Hopkins in 1872, and from Yale in 1876, ranked high in his class and receiving academic honors for his oratory skill. He then moved to St. Louis, Missouri where he taught night school to make ends meet, and studied law at the Saint Louis University School of Law, and in the offices of the prominent St. Louis law firm of Noble & Orrick; law firm partner John Willock Noble described him as "the best student he had ever known".

== Legal career ==
Buck gained admission to the bar in Missouri in 1878, but chose to pursue success in other regions, working for part of that year as a harvest hand in Dakota Territory, and as principal of a public school in Shakopee, Minnesota. In 1879, Buck began a law practice in Fort Benton, Montana, in partnership with longtime friend William Henry Hunt (who also went on to serve on the Montana Supreme Court).

On August 16, 1881, Buck married Mary E. Jewett, daughter of Dr. Pliny Jewett, a distinguished New England physician, in New Haven, Connecticut, with whom he had three children. In 1884, Buck was elected to the council, the higher branch of the Legislative Assembly of the Territory of Montana. In 1887, he moved to Helena, Montana, where he continued in the practice of the law, and served for several years the official reporter of decisions of the Montana Supreme Court. He also prepared and published a complete digest of the first eight volumes of the Montana Reports. In 1891 he was appointed a District Judge for the First Judicial District of Montana, to fill a vacancy on the bench caused by the creation of an additional judgeship; and in 1892 was elected to the office of District Judge for a full term of four years. In 1896 he was elected an associate justice of the Supreme Court of the State.

== Death ==
Buck died in Lewis and Clark County, Montana, of a self-inflicted gunshot wound to the head, at midnight on December 6, 1897. Earlier that day, he had taken part in considering two cases before the court. The coroner noted that it was impossible to determine whether the shooting was intentional or accidental.

Political offices
Preceded by William H. DeWitt	Justice of the Montana Supreme Court; 1897–1897	Succeeded by William Trigg Pigott
