= Sydney Sanner =

American judge (1872–1961)

Sydney C. Sanner (October 16, 1872 – September 3, 1961) was an American lawyer who served as a justice of the Montana Supreme Court from 1913 to 1918.

== Early life, education, and career ==
Born in Maryland, Sanner moved to Helena, Montana when he was fifteen and began reading law during high school. He continued his studies with Judge Henry C. Smith after graduation, gaining admission to the Montana Bar in 1894.

He practiced two years in Helena then moved to Big Timber, Montana. In May 1899 he began practicing in Miles City, Montana. Initially Sanner partnered with George R. Milburn but in a short time began a solo practice.

== Judicial and military service ==
Sanner ran unsuccessfully for county attorney in both Sweet Grass and Custer counties. In 1908, he was elected district judge to the 7th Judicial District, and in 1912, he was elected as an associate justice of the Montana Supreme Court, succeeding his mentor Henry C. Smith in that seat and taking office the following year. He served for one term and resigned in October 1918 after losing in a preliminary election.

Sanner then enlisted in the U.S. Army's Judge Advocate General's Corps and earned the title of lieutenant colonel. After he was honorably discharged from service, he practiced law in Butte, Montana. He later moved to California.

== Personal life and death ==
Sanner married Kirtlye Hill in 1901, with whom he had one daughter.

He was a member of the Ancient Free and Accepted Masons and the Elks.

Sanner died in Pacific Palisades, California. At the time, he was reported to have been the oldest practicing attorney in the California Bar Association.

Political offices
Preceded by Henry C. Smith	Justice of the Montana Supreme Court; 1913–1918	Succeeded by William Trigg Pigott
