= Fred L. Gibson =

American judge (1874–1956)

Associate Justice of the Montana Supreme Court
- In office 1947–1948
- Preceded by: Edwin K. Cheadle
- Succeeded by: Harrison J. Freebourn

Personal details
- Born: September 20, 1874 near Dundee, Michigan, U.S.
- Died: September 29, 1956 (aged 82) Livingston, Montana, U.S.
- Party: Republican
- Spouse: Winfred Fletcher (m. 1899)
- Children: 3
- Education: University of Nebraska College of Law
- Profession: Judge

Fred L. Gibson (September 20, 1874 – September 29, 1956) was an associate justice of the Montana Supreme Court from 1947 to 1948.

== Early life, education, and political career ==
Born near Dundee, Michigan, Gibson's family moved to Madison County, Montana, in 1894. His father was killed shortly after arriving. To finance his education in the law, Gibson taught in the local school. With sufficient funds, he attended the University of Nebraska College of Law in Lincoln, Nebraska, and obtained his law degree. Gibson moved to Virginia City, Montana, and was admitted to the Montana Bar in 1898. Finding little work, he became a newspaper man and editor for the Alder Gulch Times.

Gibson became known as a public speaker and was elected to the Montana Legislature, representing Madison County from 1899 to 1900. He was named the first County Attorney for Rosebud County, Montana, from 1901 to 1903, consequently moving to Forsyth, Montana in 1901. Longing for the mountains, Gibson moved to Livingston, Montana, in 1903. He again served in the legislature, representing Park County, Montana, in 1909, 1919, and 1921. In the 1921 session, he was speaker of the state house.

Gibson left elective politics in the 1920s, but remained active in the Montana Republican Party, also serving as president of the Montana State Bar Association in 1931.

== Judicial service ==
In 1947, Governor Sam C. Ford appointed Gibson to a seat as an associate justice of the Montana Supreme Court vacated by the resignation of Justice Edwin K. Cheadle. Gibson declared his candidacy for reelection to the seat in 1948, but lost his reelection bid to Harrison J. Freebourn, and thereafter returned to private practice.

== Personal life and death ==
Gibson married Winfred Fletcher in 1899, with whom he had one son and two daughters. Gibson died in Livingston a few weeks after his 82nd birthday.

Political offices
Preceded by Edwin K. Cheadle	Justice of the Montana Supreme Court; 1947–1948	Succeeded by Harrison J. Freebourn
