= William J. Galbraith =

American judge (1837–1907)

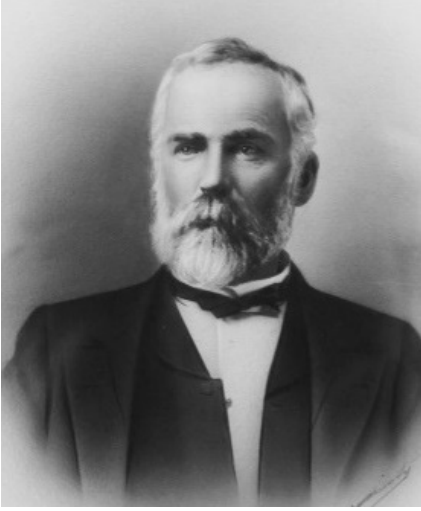

Associate Justice of the Montana Territorial Supreme Court
- In office 1879–1888
- Appointed by: 1st term Rutherford B. Hayes subsequent term Chester A. Arthur
- Preceded by: Hiram Knowles
- Succeeded by: Stephen DeWolf

Personal details
- Born: February 18, 1837 Freeport, Pennsylvania
- Died: January 23, 1907 (aged 69) Orting, Washington
- Education: Dartmouth College

William John Galbraith (February 18, 1837 – January 23, 1907) was an American attorney and jurist who served as a justice of the territorial Montana Supreme Court from 1879 to 1888.

== Early life ==
Galbraith was born in Freeport, Pennsylvania on February 18, 1837. He graduated from Dartmouth College in 1857, then studied law in Pittsburgh from 1858 to 1860, and was admitted to the Pennsylvania Bar in 1861.

At the outbreak of the American Civil War, Galbraith initially enlisted in the 78th Pennsylvania Infantry Regiment, but was later transferred to the Signal Service Department. During his time of service, he was captured and became a prisoner of war.

== Career ==
After the war, Galbraith practiced law in Franklin, Pennsylvania, Beatrice, Nebraska, and Cherokee, Iowa. In 1879, he was appointed by President Rutherford B. Hayes as an associate justice for the second district of the territory of Montana, succeeding Hiram Knowles. He was reappointed by President Chester A. Arthur in the summer of 1883.

== Later life and death ==
Galbraith retired from the Court in 1888, and was succeeded by Stephen DeWolf.

On January 23, 1907, Galbraith died in Orting, Washington. He and his wife, Nellie, had five daughters and two sons.

Political offices
Preceded by Hiram Knowles	Associate Justice of the Montana Supreme Court; 1879–1888	Succeeded by Stephen DeWolf
