= I. W. Choate =

American judge (1882–1953)

Isaac Watts Choate (September 12, 1882 – October 23, 1953) was a Montana lawyer and judge who was an appointed justice of the Montana Supreme Court, serving from 1947 to 1949.

== Early life, education, and career ==
Born in West Barnet, Caledonia County, Vermont, Choate received a B.A. from the University of Minnesota in 1904. He came to Montana in 1908, and studied law in the law office of Wilford L. Hyde and was admitted to the Montana bar in 1911. He engaged in the general practice of law. Choate served as the City Attorney for Manhattan, Montana, and later as the Assistant County Attorney of Gallatin County, Montana. He moved to Helena, Montana in 1918 to work as an Assistant Attorney General. Choate was appointed as Code Commissioner by the Montana Supreme Court shortly thereafter. In 1921, he was involved with the re-codification of Montana's statutes.

From 1924 to 1928, he served as deputy attorney general. He was county attorney of Custer County, Montana, from 1937 to 1940, and in 1941, he became counsel for the state board of equalization. In 1945, Choate was again appointed code commissioner, which he held until 1947.

== Judicial service ==
In January 1947, Choate was appointed by Governor Sam C. Ford to a seat as an associate justice of the Montana Supreme Court, succeeding Hugh R. Adair, who had been elevated to chief justice. In April 1914, Choate declared his intent to run for election to a full term on the court, but was defeated in the November election by R. V. Bottomly by a vote of 119,761 to 50,315, thereafter serving until the end of his appointed term in January 1949.

== Personal life and death ==
Choate married Roberta Gammon on September 20, 1909 in Lynn, Massachusetts. They moved to Bridger, Montana and had three sons. Choate died at the age of 71.

Political offices
Preceded by Hugh R. Adair	Justice of the Montana Supreme Court; 1947–1949	Succeeded by R. V. Bottomly
