= Troy, Iowa =

- Unincorporated community
- Location within Iowa
- Country: United States
- State: Iowa
- County: Davis
- Elevation: 804 ft (245 m)
- Time zone: UTC-6 (Central (CST))
  - Summer (DST): UTC-5 (CDT)
- Area code: 641
- GNIS feature ID: 462339

Troy is an unincorporated community in Davis County, Iowa, United States.

== History ==
The population was 110 in 1940.

O. F. Goddard, a Montana Supreme Court justice, was born in Troy.

The historical school called Troy Academy is located in Troy.
