= Gene B. Daly =

American judge (1917–1998)

Gene B. Daly (December 13, 1917 – June 27, 1998) was a justice of the Montana Supreme Court from 1970 to 1983, initially appointed to the court, and subsequently reelected.

== Early life, education, and military service ==
Born in Great Falls, Montana, Daly "gave up a promising career as a commercial artist" to care for his family after the death of his father. Daly worked in the engineering department of the Cascade County Surveyor's office before enlisting in the United States Air Force. He served for 5 years as a B-24 bomber pilot during World War II, obtaining the rank of captain. After the war, he attended Carroll College and the University of Providence in Great Falls, before receiving his law degree from the University of Montana in 1953, graduating first in his class. He also served as statewide president of the Montana Young Democrats.

== Legal career and judicial service ==
Daly briefly worked in private practice before he was elected as city attorney of Great Falls in 1955. He was then elected as Cascade County Attorney from 1959 to 1970.

In 1970, Governor Forrest H. Anderson appointed Daly to a seat on the Montana Supreme Court vacated by the death of Justice John W. Bonner. Daly retired in 1983.

== Personal life and death ==
Daly met Ruth Richardson on a blind date, and "enrolled with her in a commercial pilot training academy". They married in 1942, and had two sons together; later in life, Ruth became chronically ill, and after Daly's resignation from the court he "devoted most of his energy" to caring for her, until her death in 1987. Daly then married Beverly Dewitt in September 1989.

Daly died at the Rocky Mountain Care Center in Helena, Montana, after a lengthy illness, at the age of 81.

Political offices
Preceded by John W. Bonner	Justice of the Montana Supreme Court; 1970–1983	Succeeded by J. C. Gulbrandson
