= George Y. Patten =

American judge (1876–1951)

George Yager Patten (April 14, 1876 – February 27, 1951) was an American jurist who served as an associate justice of the Montana Supreme Court between August and November 1919. He subsequently resigned. Patten was born in Virginia City, Montana. Montana State University has a collection of his family's papers.

From 1902 to 1905 he was a second assistant state attorney general. He was a city attorney in Bozeman from 1909 to 1911 and then again 1913 to 1915.

Political offices
Preceded by John Hurly	Justice of the Montana Supreme Court; 1919–1919	Succeeded by John A. Matthews
