= John Luttrell Murphy =

American judge (1842–1912)

John Luttrell Murphy (1842 – February 27, 1912) was a justice of the Territorial Montana Supreme Court from 1871 to 1872, appointed by President Ulysses S. Grant. The appointment led to controversy, and the following year Grant withdrew the appointment, although sources are unclear as to whether Murphy was recalled or allowed to resign.

Born in Knoxville, Tennessee, Murphy served in the Union Army during the American Civil War and obtained the rank of Major. In 1867, he passed the Tennessee Bar. Murphy was appointed Associate Justice of the Montana Territorial Supreme Court by President Ulysses S. Grant on February 4, 1871. He was recalled/resigned after much controversy on October 4, 1872 and replaced by Justice Servis. Murphy then opened a law practice in Bozeman, Montana, but soon thereafter moved to San Francisco, California. Murphy served as a federal prosecutor in San Francisco, and as the City and County Attorney in the 1880s.

Murphy's wife was named Viola. Murphy died in Knoxville at the age of 70.

Political offices
Preceded by George G. Symes	Justice of the Montana Supreme Court; 1871–1872	Succeeded by Francis G. Servis
