= Albert P. Stark =

American judge (1863–1938)

Albert P. Stark (August 11, 1863 – May 5, 1938) was a justice of the Montana Supreme Court from 1923 to 1928.

Born at Stark's Corner in Cass County, Michigan, he graduated from Albion College in Albion, Michigan, in 1889 and taught school for one year. He then read law in the office of Judge C.A. Withey at Reed City, Michigan to finish his legal education. He was admitted to the bar in Michigan in 1891 and remained in the office of Judge Withey until he moved to Livingston, Montana, in 1892. Stark served as Livingston City Attorney for two years, and was then the County Attorney of Park County for four years, from 1903 to 1906. In 1912, he was elected District Judge for the 6th Judicial District. Justice Stark served ten years as District Judge until his election as Justice of the Montana Supreme Court in 1922.

After the completion of his term as on the Montana Supreme Court, Stark moved to Kirkland, Washington, where he lived until his death at the age of 75.

Political offices
Preceded by George W. Farr	Justice of the Montana Supreme Court; 1923–1929	Succeeded by Albert H. Angstman
