= R. V. Bottomly =

American judge (1885–1961)

Raymond Victor Bottomly (July 16, 1885 – February 14, 1961), often called "R. V." or "Vic", was an American lawyer and judge who served as an associate justice of the Montana Supreme Court from 1949 to 1961. His legal and public service career in Montana spanned over four decades, including service as the state's Attorney General and as a county attorney.

== Early life, education, and career ==
Born in Cedar Vale, Kansas, Bottomly received a B.S. from Emporia State University Teachers College, followed by a Bachelor of Laws degree from the University of Kansas in 1915. That same year, he moved to Montana, was admitted to the bar, and began practicing law in Harlem, Montana.

While at Kansas State Normal College, Bottomly was a founding member of the Phi Sigma Epsilon fraternity. The fraternity endured until 1984 when it merged with Phi Sigma Kappa. He became a member of the Freemasons in 1906. After moving to Montana, Bottomly became a charter member in Harlem. He was also a member of the Lions Club.

In 1916, Bottomly homesteaded in the Big Flat region north of Harlem, Montana. He served in the United States Army during World War I. In 1922, he became Blaine County Attorney, serving two terms, from 1922 to 1925. From 1933 to 1941, he was the Montana attorney for the U.S. Home Owners Loan Corporation based in Great Falls.

== Legal and judicial career ==
Bottomly was appointed Assistant Attorney General of Montana in 1941, and in 1942 was elevated to Attorney General of Montana under the state's military absence law, succeeding John W. Bonner and Howard M. Gullickson, both of whom had been called to military service during World War II. Bottomly subsequently ran for and was elected to the position in 1944. During his tenure, he represented Montana before the International Joint Commission in a dispute with Canada over Sage Creek water rights, and successfully defended the state's right to impose motor carrier taxes on interstate truckers before the U.S. Supreme Court.

In 1948, Bottomly was elected to a six-year term on the Montana Supreme Court, defeating incumbent I. W. Choate by a vote of 119,761 to 50,315, He held the position from 1949 to until 1961.

He was re-elected in 1954 and served until 1960, when he chose not to run for another term.

== Personal life and death ==
Bottomly was commissioner of the North Central Montana Boy Scout Council and a member-at-large of the National Scout Board.

On December 10, 1916, Bottomly married Mouriel Heath, with whom he had two daughters and seven sons, including Col. Raymond V. Bottomly Jr., Col. Heath Bottomly, Judge Richard V. Bottomly, and James Bottomly, a lawyer in Helena. At the time of his death, he was survived by his wife, all nine children, 21 grandchildren, and three sisters. Bottomly died in Great Falls, Montana, after a prolonged illness, at the age of 75.

Political offices
Preceded by I. W. Choate	Justice of the Montana Supreme Court; 1949–1961	Succeeded by John C. Harrison
Preceded by Howard M. Gullickson	Montana Attorney General; 1942–1949	Succeeded by Arnold Olsen
