= Albert H. Angstman =

American judge (1888–1964)

Justice of the Montana Supreme Court
- In office 1945–1961
- Preceded by: Albert Anderson
- Succeeded by: Stanley M. Doyle
- In office 1937–1942
- Preceded by: John A. Matthews
- Succeeded by: Hugh R. Adair
- In office January 1929 – 1934
- Preceded by: Albert P. Stark
- Succeeded by: Claude F. Morris

Personal details
- Born: March 23, 1888 near Farmington, Minnesota, U.S.
- Died: February 29, 1964 (aged 75)
- Spouse: Mary Frances Chirgwin
- Children: 3
- Education: St. Paul College of Law
- Profession: Judge

Military service
- Allegiance: United States
- Branch/service: United States Navy
- Battles/wars: World War I

Albert H. Angstman (March 23, 1888 – February 29, 1964) was a justice of the Montana Supreme Court from 1929 to 1934, again from 1937 to 1942, and again from 1945 to 1961.

Born on a farm near Farmington, Minnesota, he graduated from the St. Paul College of Law in 1912, and moved to Helena, Montana. He served in the U.S. Navy during World War I.

Angstman was a first assistant attorney general prior to being elected to the court in November 1928 to take office the following January. He left the court in 1935 to become secretary and attorney of the state railroad and state public service commission. He was again elected to the court in 1936, serving his second stint until 1943.

Angstman married Mary Frances Chirgwin, with whom he had three children.

Political offices
| Preceded by Albert P. Stark; John A. Matthews; Albert Anderson | Justice of the Montana Supreme Court; 1929–1934; 1937–1942; 1945–1961 | Succeeded by Claude F. Morris; Hugh R. Adair; Stanley M. Doyle |
