= John C. Harrison (judge) =

American judge (1913–2011)

John Conway Harrison (April 28, 1913 – November 11, 2011) was the longest-serving Associate Justice of the Montana Supreme Court, holding that office from 1961 to 1995.

== Early life ==
Born in Grand Rapids, Minnesota, his family moved to Harlowton, Montana in 1928. Harrison received his J.D. from the George Washington University Law School in 1940, and served in the United States Army during World War II, from 1940 to 1946. After the war, he joined the Army Reserves, achieving the rank of colonel.

== Career ==
He served as County Attorney of Lewis and Clark County, Montana, from 1954 to 1960, when he was elected to the Montana Supreme Court.

== Personal life ==
In August 1941, Harrison married Virginia Flanagan, with whom he had three sons and three daughters. Virginia died in 1984, and in 1987 he married Ethel Harrison. Harrison died in Helena, Montana, at the age of 98.

Political offices
| Preceded by R. V. Bottomly | Justice of the Montana Supreme Court; 1961–1995 | Succeeded by W. William Leaphart |
