= Henry N. Blake =

American judge (1838–1933)

Henry Nichols Blake
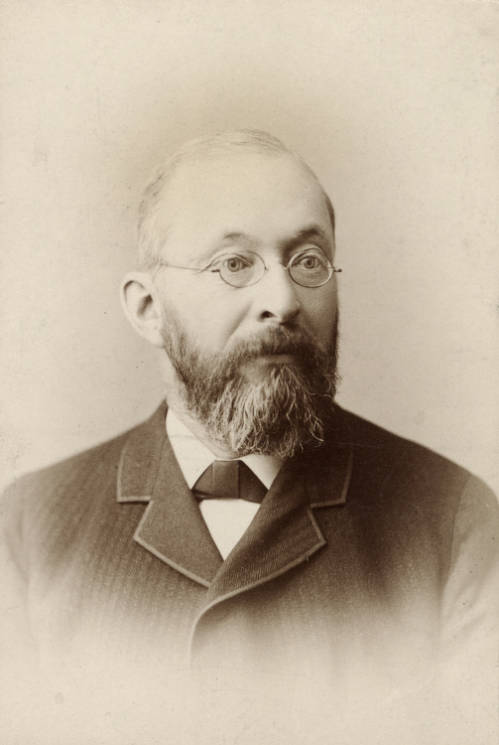

Chief Justice of the Montana Supreme Court
- In office 1889–1893
- Succeeded by: William Y. Pemberton

Chief Justice of the Montana Territorial Supreme Court
- In office 1889–1889
- Appointed by: Benjamin Harrison
- Preceded by: Newton W. McConnell

Personal details
- Born: June 5, 1838; Dorchester, Massachusetts
- Died: November 29, 1933 (aged 95); Boston, Massachusetts
- Education: Harvard Law School

Henry Nichols Blake (June 5, 1838 – November 29, 1933) was a lawyer and newspaper editor who served as associate justice and chief justice of the Montana Territorial Supreme Court and as the first chief justice of the Montana Supreme Court after statehood.

== Life ==
Blake was born in Dorchester, Massachusetts. He graduated from Harvard College in 1858 with an LL.B., and practiced law in Boston until April 1861. He served in the Union Army during the American Civil War before mustering out in 1864 after being wounded a second time. After the war, he wrote the book Three Years in the Army about his military service and moved to Montana in 1866.

Blake settled in Virginia City, Montana, where he served as editor in chief of the Montana Post. The work was difficult because, at the time, no telegraph lines or railroads existed in Montana Territory. Blake later wrote, "the preparation of the locals for the tri-weekly edition was troublesome because there was a paucity in the country tributary to a village as small as Virginia City, and mountains were made of mole hills, dressed to the best of my ability in attractive phrases."

Blake later worked as an attorney in Virginia City. Together with James E. Callaway, he represented two Chinese miners, Ah Wah and Ah Yen, on trial for murder in 1881. A jury found the defendants guilty of first-degree murder, but Blake and Callaway successfully appealed to the Montana Territorial Supreme Court, where the defendants were acquitted. Blake developed a reputation for color-blind justice.

Blake was appointed an associate justice of the Montana Territorial Supreme Court by President Ulysses S. Grant and served from 1875 until 1880. He was appointed Chief Justice of the Territorial Supreme Court in 1889 by President Benjamin Harrison. He also served the first chief justice of the Montana Supreme Court from 1889 until 1893.

In 1916 he was announced as Harvard's commencement speaker.

== Personal life and death ==
He married Clara J. Clark (1846–1932) in 1870 and they traveled together by stagecoach to his home in Helena, Montana. When they returned to Massachusetts about 1912, they lived with their son-in-law Eugene Hultman, Police Commissioner of Boston. They had at least two daughters. One of their grandchildren was Harvard football star C.A. (Tubby) Clark. Clara Clark died on November 24, 1932.

Blake died in Boston on November 29, 1933. At his death he was the oldest surviving graduate of Harvard Law School. He was buried in Dorchester's Old North Burial Ground.

== See also ==
- List of justices of the Montana Supreme Court

Political offices
Preceded by Newly established court	Justice of the Montana Supreme Court; 1875–1885; 1889–1893	Succeeded by William Y. Pemberton
