= Harrison J. Freebourn =

American judge (1890–1954)

Harrison J. Freebourn (February 17, 1890 – December 14, 1954) was Montana Attorney General from 1937 to 1940, and a justice of the Montana Supreme Court from 1949 to 1954.

Born in Erie, Pennsylvania, Freebourn moved to Butte, Montana, in 1909 and worked in the mines and smelters of Butte during the day while studying law at night. He was admitted to the Montana Bar in 1918, and served as the county attorney of Silver Bow County from 1929 to 1936, and then as the Montana Attorney General from January 4, 1937, to January 6, 1940.

Freebourn married Anne Donnelly on January 18, 1911, with whom he had five children. Anne died in 1934, and on November 30, 1936, Freebourn married Mary Elizabeth Moran, with whom he had three children. Freebourn died in Helena, Montana, at the age of 64.

Political offices
Preceded by Fred L. Gibson	Justice of the Montana Supreme Court; 1949–1954	Succeeded by Horace S. Davis
