= Judge Anderson (disambiguation) =

Judge Anderson is a fictional character from Judge Dredd comic books. Judge Anderson may also refer to:

- Albert B. Anderson (1857–1938), judge of the United States Court of Appeals for the Seventh Circuit
- Aldon J. Anderson (1917–1996), judge of the United States District Court for the District of Utah
- G. Ross Anderson (1929–2020), judge of the United States District Court for the District of South Carolina
- George W. Anderson (judge) (1861–1938), judge of the United States Court of Appeals for the First Circuit
- Harry B. Anderson (1879–1935), judge of the United States District Court for the Western District of Tennessee
- J. Blaine Anderson (1922–1988), judge of the United States Court of Appeals for the Ninth Circuit
- Joseph F. Anderson (born 1949), judge of the United States District Court for the District of South Carolina
- Percy Anderson (judge) (born 1948), judge of the United States District Court for the Central District of California
- R. Lanier Anderson III (born 1936), judge of the United States Court of Appeals for the Eleventh Circuit
- Robert P. Anderson (1906–1978), judge of the United States Court of Appeals for the Second Circuit
- S. Thomas Anderson (born 1953), judge of the United States District Court for the Western District of Tennessee
- Stephen H. Anderson (born 1932), judge of the United States Court of Appeals for the Tenth Circuit

== See also ==
- Wayne Andersen (born 1945), judge of the United States District Court for the Northern District of Illinois
- Justice Anderson (disambiguation)
