= Henry C. Smith (judge) =

American judge (1862–1932)

Henry Cooper Smith (August 3, 1862 – May 15, 1932) was a justice of the Montana Supreme Court from 1907 to 1913.

Born in Fond du Lac County, Wisconsin, Smith read law with the firms of Sale & Pierce and Norcross & Dinwiddie prior to admitted to the Wisconsin bar in 1885.

He moved to Helena, Montana, in 1888, practice law and was elected in 1896 as a district judge to the First Judicial District. In 1906 would follow his election as an associate justice of the Montana Supreme Court, serving until his term expired in 1913. He then returned to private practice. He campaigned unsuccessfully for the Senate in 1912.

Future Montana Supreme Court justice Sydney Sanner read law with Smith. Sanner was later elected to fill Smith's vacated seat.

Smith had married, had three sons and died in Helena, Montana at the age of 69.

Political offices
| Preceded by George R. Milburn | Justice of the Montana Supreme Court; 1901–1907 | Succeeded by Sydney Sanner |
