= Theodore M. Brantley =

American judge

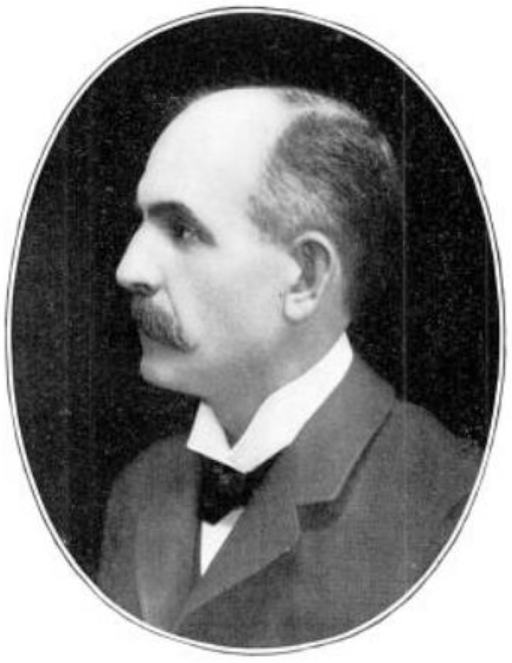

Chief Justice of the Montana Supreme Court
- In office 1899–1922
- Preceded by: William Y. Pemberton
- Succeeded by: Llewellyn L. Callaway

Personal details
- Born: February 12, 1851 Lebanon, Tennessee, U.S.
- Died: September 16, 1922 (aged 71) Helena, Montana, U.S.
- Education: Cumberland University

Theodore M. Brantley (or Brantly (Note: The rest of his family seems to have preferred the spelling Brantly, without the "e." Many period sources, however, spell Theodore Brantley's name with the added "e.")) (February 12, 1851 – September 16, 1922) was the longest-serving Chief Justice of the Montana Supreme Court, serving for 23 years (1899–1922).

== Biography ==
Brantley was born near Lebanon, Tennessee. He came from a political family in Tennessee—two of his mother's brothers were elected governor of Tennessee (Neill S. Brown in 1847, John C. Brown in 1871). Brantley was educated at Southwestern Presbyterian University in Clarksville, Tennessee and the law school of Cumberland University in Lebanon, graduating in 1881. After practicing law for several years, Brantly became a professor of Ancient Languages, first at Illinois College and then at the College of Montana in Deer Lodge. After returning to the practice of law for several years, Brantley was elected District Judge in the 3rd Judicial District of Montana in 1892 and then Chief Justice of the Montana Supreme Court in the November 1898 elections. He remained Chief Justice until resigning for reasons of health shortly before his death in 1922, in Helena, Montana.

Brantley became a Mason in 1892 and served as the Most Worshipful Grand Master of Masons in Montana in 1900.

Brantley was married in 1891 to Lois Reat and had 3 children - Theodore Lee, Lois Brown, and Neill Duncan Brantly. Neill Duncan Brantly (1897–1972) joined the navy and became a Rear Admiral during World War II, commanding vessels at the Battle of Leyte Gulf. Lois Brown Brantly (1894–1972) married Frank A. Hazelbaker, lieutenant governor of Montana 1929–1933.

Brantley's brother Erskine Brantly (1850–1936) was a prominent clergyman and school official in Oklahoma.

Brantly Hall at the University of Montana is named after Brantley's wife Lois, who served as head resident there for many years.

== Notes ==
Political offices
Preceded by William Y. Pemberton	Justice of the Montana Supreme Court; 1899-1922	Succeeded by Llewellyn L. Callaway
