= Montana Justice Foundation =

American non-profit organization

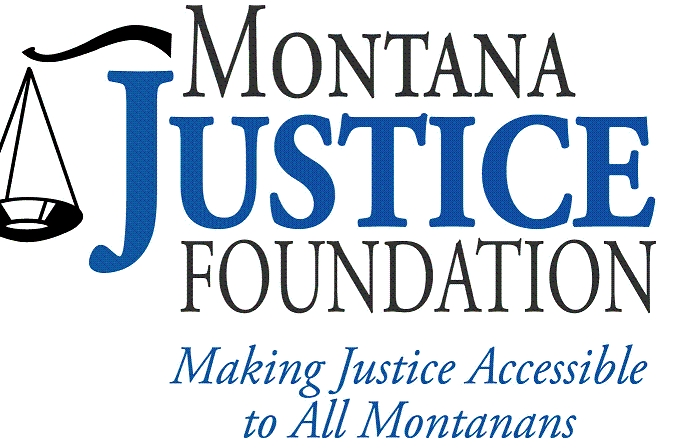
- Founded: 1979
- Location: Helena, Montana, USA
- Region served: Montana, US
- Website: www.mtjustice.org

The Montana Justice Foundation (MJF), founded in 1979, is a charitable, non-profit organization that purports to make justice accessible to all Montanans.

== Description ==
The MJF is the charitable arm of the State Bar of Montana. It funds and supports organizations committed to ensuring that all Montanans, especially the vulnerable and under served, have meaningful access to the civil justice system. IOLTA (Interest on Lawyers Trust Accounts) funds are collected by the MJF and distributed through a comprehensive grants program. The MJF strategically and objectively allocates its resources to dozens of outstanding legal aid organizations and access to justice initiatives in the state of Montana. Its primary focus is the funding of the Montana Legal Services Association. However, as IOLTA funds permit, other grants are awarded. Past grantee organizations have included Domestic Violence Education & Services (DOVES), CASA of Missoula, Eastern Montana CASA/GAL, Community Mediation Center of Bozeman, The Nurturing Center, Community Dispute Resolution Center of Missoula, and Cascade County Law Clinic.

Clients who receive assistance through guarantee organizations are primarily at 125% of the Federal poverty rate or lower. The legal services provided focus on clients’ most basic human needs: preserving housing, protecting subsistence income, obtaining access to health care, providing food and clothing for families and maintaining their safety, independence, and dignity.
