= Beth Baker =

American judge (born 1961)

Associate Justice of the Montana Supreme Court
- Incumbent
- Assumed office January 3, 2011
- Preceded by: W. William Leaphart
- Succeeded by: Amy Eddy (elect)

Personal details
- Born: November 29, 1961 (age 64) Spokane, Washington, U.S.
- Education: University of Washington (BA); University of Montana (JD)

Beth Baker (born November 29, 1961) is an American lawyer who is an associate justice of the Montana Supreme Court. Elected on November 2, 2010 and sworn into office on January 3, 2011, she became the fourth woman to serve on Montana's highest bench. She took the seat of the retired Justice W. William Leaphart. In the 2018 election, Justice Baker was retained for another eight year term.

Originally from Spokane, Washington, she graduated magna cum laude in 1982 from the University of Washington with a bachelor's degree in Speech Communication. Baker received her Juris Doctor degree, with high honors, from the University of Montana School of Law in 1985.

Baker clerked for Judge Charles C. Lovell of the United States District Court for the District of Montana, from 1985 to 1989. For 11 years, from 1989 to 2000, she was an Assistant Attorney General with the Montana Department of Justice. During this time she served four years as Assistant Chief Deputy Attorney General and four years as Chief Deputy Attorney General. She left state government for private practice at the Helena, Montana law firm of Hughes, Kellner, Sullivan and Alke from 2000 to 2010. While there, she was awarded the State Bar of Montana's Bousliman Professionalism Award in 2006. The award honored her efforts to provide access to legal services to people with limited means.

Justice Baker served for ten years on the Montana Supreme Court's Access to Justice Commission. As of 2024, she also serves as an ex officio director of the Montana Justice Foundation.

In 2010, Baker ran against Nels Swandal for the vacated seat of Justice Leaphart. Baker was endorsed by Leaphart as his successor. In her campaign, she promoted a non-partisan judiciary. Even so, she was backed by left-leaning groups. In contrast to Baker's adherence to non-partisanship, Swandal openly stated his conservative preference during the campaign.

In 2018, Baker ran unopposed to retain her seat. She won 73% "yes" votes to the question if she should retain her seat.

Legal offices
Preceded by W. William Leaphart	Justice of the Montana Supreme Court; 2011–present	Succeeded by Amy Eddy; Elect
