= Ingrid Gustafson =

American judge (born 1961)

Justice of the Montana Supreme Court
- Incumbent
- Assumed office January 2018
- Appointed by: Steve Bullock
- Preceded by: Mike Wheat

Personal details
- Born: December 11, 1961 (age 64) Laramie, Wyoming, U.S.
- Education: Montana State University (BS); University of Montana (JD)

Ingrid G. Gustafson (born December 11, 1961) is an associate justice of the Montana Supreme Court. She was appointed in December 2017 by Governor Steve Bullock to fill the seat of retiring Justice Mike Wheat. She ran unopposed in 2018 for the remainder of Wheat's term. In 2022, Gustafson ran against James Brown, winning an eight year term. She also serves as the vice president of the Montana Judges Association.

== History ==
Gustafson was born in Wyoming and moved to Montana in 1972. She attended Montana State University on a skiing scholarship and graduated with honors in 1983. She was named to the MSU Hall of Fame for her skiing accomplishments in college. Gustafson obtained her Juris Doctor degree from the University of Montana Law School in 1988, again with honors.

Gustafson worked as a staff attorney for the Social Security Administration for two years, and entered private practice in 1991. In that period, she also was a public defender in Rosebud County, Montana. From 1996 to 2004, she was a managing partner at the law firm Graves, Toennis and Gustafson in Billings, Montana.

She was appointed as District Judge of Montana's 13th Judicial District, which oversees Yellowstone County, by former Governor Judy Martz, and took the bench in 2004. She succeeded retiring District Judge and former Montana Supreme Court justice Diane Barz. She was re-elected to the bench in 2004, 2006 and 2012. Gustafson started Yellowstone County's drug court in 2011. This was Montana's first felony drug court.

In 2017, she became the first justice appointed to the Montana Supreme Court rather than elected. She was chosen by Governor Bullock to replace Mike Wheat who retired effective December 31. She then ran unopposed in 2018. That election was for the remaining four years of Wheat's term.

In 2022, Gustafson ran a costly campaign against James Brown, a Helena based attorney. The race ended up as having the most money ever spent in a Montana Supreme Court race. Even though the election is non-partisan, special interest groups spent a significant amount of money on the race. Montana Free Press reported $3 million spent by outside groups. Montana Republican leaders supported Brown early in his campaign, setting the stage for an election with partisanship overtones. Gustafson won with 54% of the votes. Brown blamed his loss on the "millions of dollars in liberal money" that had flooded the state in the final weeks of the race.

As of 2024, she is Vice President of the Montana Judges Association.

Legal offices
Preceded by Mike Wheat	Justice of the Montana Supreme Court; 2018–present	Incumbent
