= John C. Sheehy =

American jurist (1918–2017)

John C. Sheehy (January 27, 1918 – April 7, 2017) was a justice of the Montana Supreme Court from 1978 to 1991.

== Early life, education, and career ==
Born in Butte, Montana, to Irish immigrants, Sheehy originally planned to work as a miner like his father, but after his left hand was permanently damaged in an accident in which he was struck by a drunk driver, he went to college instead.

He received a Bachelor of Laws degree from the University of Montana in 1943, and moved to Billings, Montana, "where he practiced law for the next 35 years". During this time, he served as a member of the Montana House of Representatives in 1959 and 1965 and as a member of the Montana Senate from 1969 to 1971. In 1972, he won the Democratic nomination for Montana Attorney General, but lost the general election to Robert Woodahl.

== Judicial service ==
On April 12, 1978, Governor Tom Judge appointed Sheehy to a seat on the Montana Supreme Court vacated by the elevation of Frank I. Haswell to the position of chief justice, following the resignation of Paul G. Hatfield. In an incident in June 1984, a disgruntled litigant "burst into Sheehy's Supreme Court chambers in Helena, holding him hostage at gunpoint for most of the afternoon", until Sheehy was able to talk the gunman into surrendering his weapon. Sheehy served until 1991.

== Personal life and death ==
In 1945, Sheehy married Rita Ann Schilta, with whom he had 11 children.

He died in April 2017 at the age of 99.

Political offices
Preceded by Frank I. Haswell	Justice of the Montana Supreme Court; 1978–1991	Succeeded by Terry N. Trieweiler
