= John Warner (judge) =

American judge

Justice of the Montana Supreme Court
- In office 2003–2009
- Preceded by: Terry N. Trieweiler
- Succeeded by: Mike Wheat

Personal details
- Born: January 22, 1943 (age 83) Great Falls, Montana, U.S.
- Spouse: Katherine
- Children: 6
- Education: Montana State University (B.A.); University of Montana School of Law (J.D.)

John Arnan Warner (born January 22, 1943) is an American attorney and judge who served as an associate justice of the Montana Supreme Court. Warner won an unopposed retention vote in 2006; he retired from the court in 2009.

Warner was born and raised in Great Falls, Montana. He attended Montana State University in Missoula, from which he earned a Bachelor of Arts in history and political science in 1965. In 1967, he graduated from the University of Montana School of Law. He served as a law clerk for the Montana Supreme Court from 1967 to 1968, and then practiced law as a litigator for twenty years in Havre. He held numerous legal positions during this time, including chairman of the Montana Supreme Court's Commission on Uniform District Court Rules, trustee and president of the State Bar of Montana, and Havre City Attorney. He was also chairman of the board of Hill Top Recovery, an alcohol rehabilitation center, on the board of directors of the Montana Amateur Athletic Union, president of Montana Swimming, Inc., District Delegate for the Montana Officials Association, and a member of his parish council.

In 1988, Warner was elected District Judge of the Montana 12th Judicial District, and he was re-elected in 1994 and 2000. While a judge, Warner also served as president of the Montana Judges Association, as chairman of the Montana Supreme Court's Sentence Review Division, and as chairman of the Montana Judicial Standards Commission. In May 2003, he was appointed to the Montana Supreme Court by Governor Judy Martz to replace the resigning Justice Terry N. Trieweiler. He retired from the court in 2009 and his position was filled by the appointment of Mike Wheat.

Warner has six children with his wife, Katherine, and twelve grandchildren.
