= Paulette Leaphart =

American woman (born 1966)

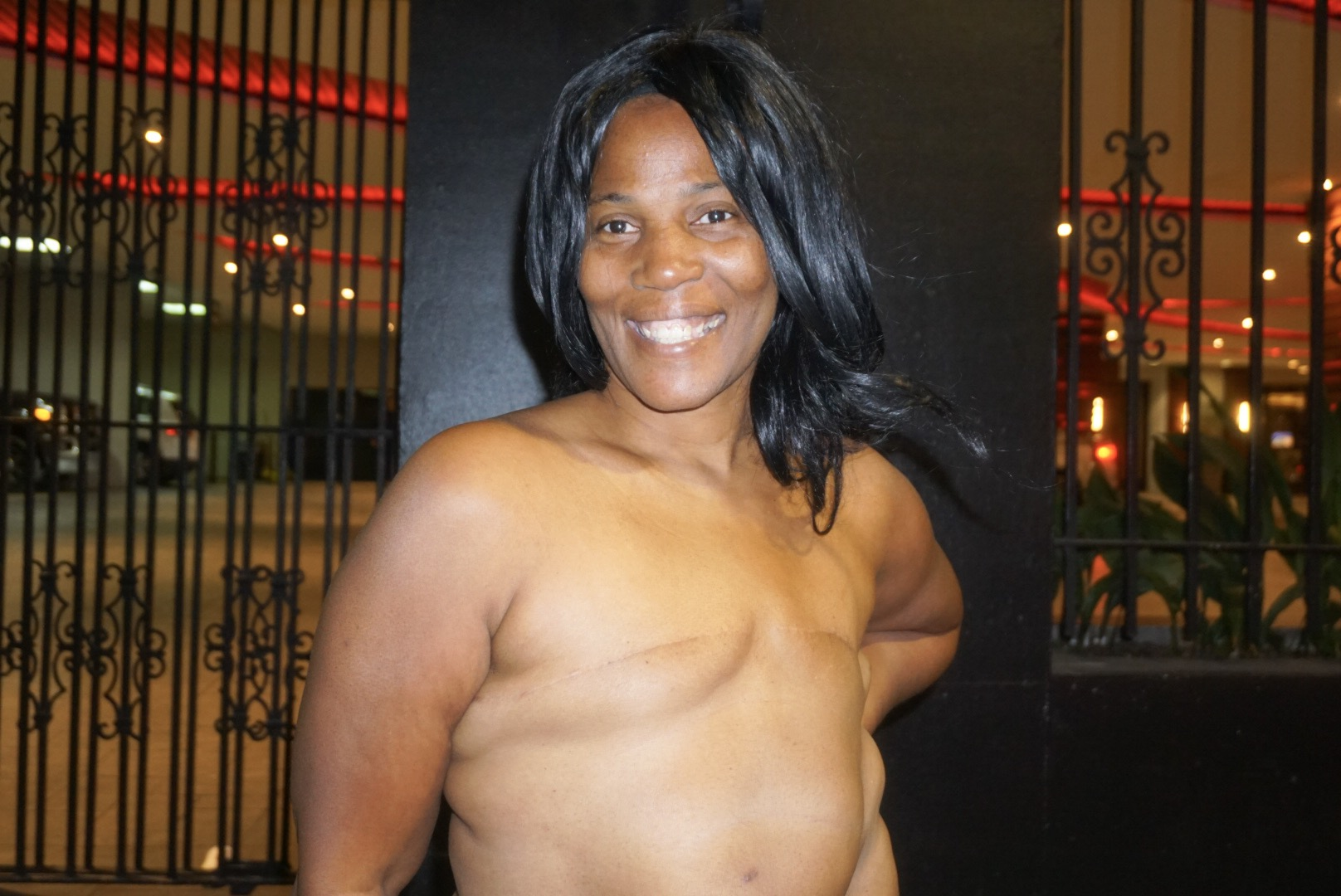
Paulette Leaphart

Paulette Leaphart (born 1966) is an American woman who gained national attention through her self-advocacy as a breast cancer survivor and 1,000 mile walk for awareness.

== Personal life ==
Leapheart was born on June 27, 1966. She has eight children; four adopted and four biological. Her oldest daughter, Porsha Cummings, 31, said her mother welcomed girls who were no longer acceptable in the foster care system due to age. She ran a day care out of her home, and gave special rates to parents who couldn't afford care. According to Cummings, Leapheart even took in foster children and paid for their private education.

"Sometimes my mom gives so much she gets hurt," Cummings said. "Her intentions are always pure."

Leapheart owned a day care in Virginia for just under two years before persuading two women from her church to invest in the business. According to court documents, Leapheart had defaulted on her lease and “fraudulently represented” the worth of her business at $200,000. The plaintiffs were awarded more than $100,000 but never saw any restitution from Leapheart.

In 2014, Leaphart said she woke up from a dream one morning and heard God say to her that she had breast cancer. According to medical records, Leaphart had a 0.7 cm cancerous tumor in her right breast, and a six sentinel lymph node on her right side that tested positive for cancer. Although she claimed to have cancer in her left breast, the left breast was benign. As well, Leaphart on occasion talked about the cancer metastasizing to other organs in her body; however, no medical records could be obtained to substantiate this claim.

Although there are skeptics who have made accusations that she did not have cancer at all, Leaphart did in fact have cancer. She had a double mastectomy two days before Valentine's Day in 2014.

Following her double mastectomy, Leapheart's daughter posted a photo of her scars on Facebook. The photo went viral. It has been reported that by exposing her scars publicly, Leapheart inspired hundreds of cancer survivors and their family members to share their own stories.

Eight months after her surgery, Leapheart said that God spoke to her on a beach and told her to remove her shirt. It was the first time, she said, that she allowed other people to see her scars. “It didn’t just free me that day,” Leapheart recalls, “everybody who witnessed it and saw my scars, they were freed, too.” Two women started to cry, she said, and soon the whole beach was applauding.

In an interview with ABC News, Leapheart said that as a single mother of four children aged 8, 13, 14 and 15, she was burdened with $1,500 every month in medical expenses. "I lost everything fighting," Leaphart said. "I didn’t have insurance...I lost my house. I had to sell my car. I had to sell everything that I had of value.”

It was because of this that Leapheart decided to walk from her home in Biloxi, Mississippi to the steps of Congress in Washington D.C. in order to raise awareness for breast cancer and for other women with cancer who cannot afford post-surgical treatment including reconstructive surgery. She reportedly spent a year in training, walking 30 miles a day: half in the morning and half in the evening. It was during this training that she began to walk topless. On account of this, Leapheart gained national recognition.

The 1,034 mile walk from her home in Biloxi, MS, to Washington, D.C. was completed on Leapheart's 50th birthday, June 27, 2016, with her daughter. During her walk, Leapheart went without a shirt to draw attention to her double mastectomy, and at times had to explain her legal rights to be seen without a shirt in public.

Although Leapheart claimed that singer Beyoncé had agreed to walk with her: "she said I inspired her -- that she admired me. It was great to hear that. I asked her to join me for a block of the walk, and she offered to join me for a mile," the musical artist did not show. This did not bother Leapheart, who remained focused on her goal.

Leaphart was featured as a performer in the “Hope” interlude and “Freedom” section of Beyoncé's video album, ’’Lemonade’’. During the casting of which, she showed the trailer of a documentary which was being filmed “Scar Story” as she prepared for her journey, and later spoke about it with the artist.

In December 2016, Leapheart was given the “espnW Pegasus Award for Inspiration”. She attended the espnW Women + Sports Summit in California where poet and author, Nikky Finney, shared “Topless in America”, an original work that she wrote in Leapheart's honor.

In 2017, Leapheart asked for prayers on social media regarding her fears of kidney cancer due to pain and setbacks. The results were merely kidney stones. She also expressed worry that a lump under her arm was the return of her breast cancer: it was a cyst.

== Documentary ==
While on a practice walk in the Ninth Ward section of New Orleans, Leapheart met Brooklyn-based filmmakers Emily MacKenzie and Sasha Solodukhina. Leapheart approached producer Solodukhina, lifted her shirt and said her story needed to be told. The film team signed on to make a film documenting the 1,000 mile journey from Biloxi, Mississippi to Washington DC with the understanding that Leapheart and the filming crew would be responsible for their own arrangements, finances, strategy, etc.

A trailer for the film was made and released in October 2015, and a Kickstarter campaign launched to raise money for the project shortly thereafter. Although it was $8,000 short of its $30,000 goal nearly a week before ending, $32,185 was pledged at the close of the campaign. At the same time, a gofundme page was set up for those who wished to help Leapheart along the journey. Only $8,640 out of a $100,000 goal was raised.

The filmmakers spent several months preparing for the walk, and periodically checked in with Leapheart to make sure she was on track for the journey. She assured them that all was set. However, on the morning of the walk, the film crew met Leapheart, who promptly asked: “Which way should I go?”

"My heart sank," MacKenzie told me. "In that moment when she said that, I felt betrayed and deeply worried."

Leapheart insisted on bringing her 8-year-old daughter, even though concerns were raised by the filmmakers. Before long, the crew was having to step in and assist in caring for the child. Over the course of three days, only 37 miles were covered in total. Leapheart developed terrible blisters on her feet.

“I am sad to report that while we were with her on the road, the environment became hostile and unsafe for my team,” said MacKenzie.

The filmmakers began to worry about the safety of the daughter and offered to drive her and Leapheart back to New Orleans. They contacted their relatives to set up arrangements; and only departed when they were assured that loved ones were on their way. The filmmakers announced in early June on social media that they were ending the project.

The film was never finished.

== Controversy ==
On March 31, 2017, investigative reporter for CNN News Jessica Ravitz published an article on Leapheart entitled: “The Naked Truth”. In it, several questions were raised about the veracity of certain key parts of Leaphart's story.

Despite the questions raised in the article, however, Ravitz also points out the overwhelming difference between African American women and other women regarding breast cancer in the United States; stating that black women have the lowest breast cancer survival rate of any ethnic or racial group. Furthermore, Leapheart discovered a widespread audience that shared in her message of hope and faith. “There’s no way to measure how much of a difference [Leapheart] made in shaping the conversation about cancer in this country,” she writes.

The story has since been picked up by several media outlets worldwide.
