= James E. Callaway =

American politician and lawyer

James Edmund Callaway (July 7, 1834 – August 21, 1905) was an American politician and lawyer.

Born in Trigg County, Kentucky, Callaway and his family moved to Illinois in 1848. Callaway studied law, was admitted to the Illinois bar, and practiced law in Tuscola, Illinois. During the American Civil War, Callaway served in the 21st Illinois Volunteer Infantry Regiment. After the war, Callaway returned to Illinois and practiced law. In 1869, Callaway served in the Illinois House of Representatives as a Republican. In 1871, President Ulysses Grant appointed Callaway Secretary for Montana Territory serving until 1877. Callaway, wife, and family lived in Virginia City, Montana where he continued to practiced law. In 1878 and 1879, Callaway was United States attorney for Montana Territory. Callaway served in the Montana Territorial Legislature, in the Montana Territorial House of Representatives in 1885 and was the first Republican to serve as speaker of the Montana territorial house. Callaway also served as a delegate to the Montana Constitutional Conventions of 1884 and 1889. In 1898, Callaway retired because of ill health.

Callaway's son, Llewellyn L. Callaway, would later serve for many years as chief justice of the Montana Supreme Court.
