= Edwin K. Cheadle =

American judge (c. 1895–1981)

Edwin K. Cheadle Jr. (c. 1895 – February 1, 1981) was a justice of the Montana Supreme Court from 1944 to 1947.

== Biography ==
Born in Fergus County, Montana, to Edwin K. Cheadle Sr. and Ida Constance Wohlfahrt, Cheadle's father was a Montana attorney who became a state district court judge. Cheadle graduated with a degree in law from New York University, and joined the United States Army in 1917 to fight in World War I. Returning to Montana after the war, he engaged in the general practice of law with his father, and joined the Montana National Guard in 1921. He served continuously in the U.S. military until 1955 and reached the rank of Colonel. Cheadle was elected to the Montana House of Representatives in November 1926.

== Personal life and death ==
Cheadle married Ruth Moore in Lewistown, Montana in 1923 and they had three daughters. He died in Helena, Montana at the age of 85.

Political offices
Preceded by Leif Erickson	Justice of the Montana Supreme Court; 1945–1947	Succeeded by Fred L. Gibson
