= W. William Leaphart =

American judge (born 1946)

W. William Leaphart (born December 3, 1946) was a justice of the Montana Supreme Court from 1995 to 2010. He was initially elected to the court in 1994, and reelected in 2002.

Born in Butte, Montana, Leaphart graduated from Helena High School in 1965, then attended Whitman College from 1965 to 1966, and then the University of Montana from 1966 to 1969, where he received a BA in Liberal Arts. He received his J.D. from the University of Montana Law School and in 1972. He engaged in the private practice of law for 21 years. Leaphart was elected to the Montana Supreme Court in 1994 and retired on December 31, 2010. He and his wife, Babs, have three daughters.

Political offices
Preceded by John C. Harrison	Justice of the Montana Supreme Court; 1995–2010	Succeeded by Beth Baker
