= Terry N. Trieweiler =

American judge (born 1948)

Terry Nicholas Trieweiler (born March 21, 1948) was a justice of the Montana Supreme Court from 1990 to 2003. He served on the board of directors for several national trial lawyer associations and was selected as Montana Trial Lawyer of the Year in 2010.

== Early life and education ==
Trieweiler was born in Dubuque, Iowa, to George Nicholas and Anne Marie (Oastern) Trieweiler. He graduated with academic honors from Dubuque's Wahlert Catholic High School in 1966, where he was a member of the football and wrestling teams. He attended Drake University on a four-year football scholarship, distinguishing himself athletically by lettering in football, wrestling and intramural basketball.

Trieweiler received a Bachelor of Arts from Drake in 1970, and a Juris Doctor from Drake University Law School in 1973. At Drake Law School, he was selected through competition as the school's Outstanding Oral Advocate. He gained admission to the bar in Montana in 1975.

== Career ==
In 1981, Governor Ted Schwinden appointed Trieweiler to the Montana Governor's Workers Compensation Advisory Council. In 1983, he became only the second Montana resident to be certified as a specialist in civil trial advocacy by the National Board of Trial Advocacy in Washington, D.C. In 1986, he was elected president of both the State Bar Association of Montana and the Montana Trial Lawyers Association, becoming one of only two attorneys in the state to have served in both positions. Trieweiler served as a guest lecturer at the University of Montana Law School in 1988.

In 1989, he was elected to the board of directors for the Association of Trial Lawyers of America. He was also appointed to the board of directors for the American Board of Trial Advocates, a national group of plaintiffs, defense lawyers and judges who distinguished themselves in the field of courtroom advocacy. In 1990, Trieweiler became an instructor of civil procedure at the University of Montana Law School.

He was elected to the Montana Supreme Court in 1991, where he served until 2003. In 1992, Trieweiler was awarded Drake University's Double 'D' Award, presented to former Drake athletes for achievements in their profession and community. On the court, he wrote the opinion in the noted open-fields doctrine case of State v. Bullock, in which the court held that individuals have a privacy interest in property marked by fencing or "no trespassing" signs.

In 2010 Trieweler was selected as Montana Trial Lawyer of the Year.

== Personal life ==
Trieweiler and his wife Carol have lived in Whitefish, Montana since 1975. They have three daughters: Kathryn Ann, Christini Marie and Anna Theresa.

Political offices
Preceded by Diane Barz	Justice of the Montana Supreme Court; 1990–2003	Succeeded by John Warner
