= Troy Academy =

Coordinates: 40.6797°N 92.2008°W

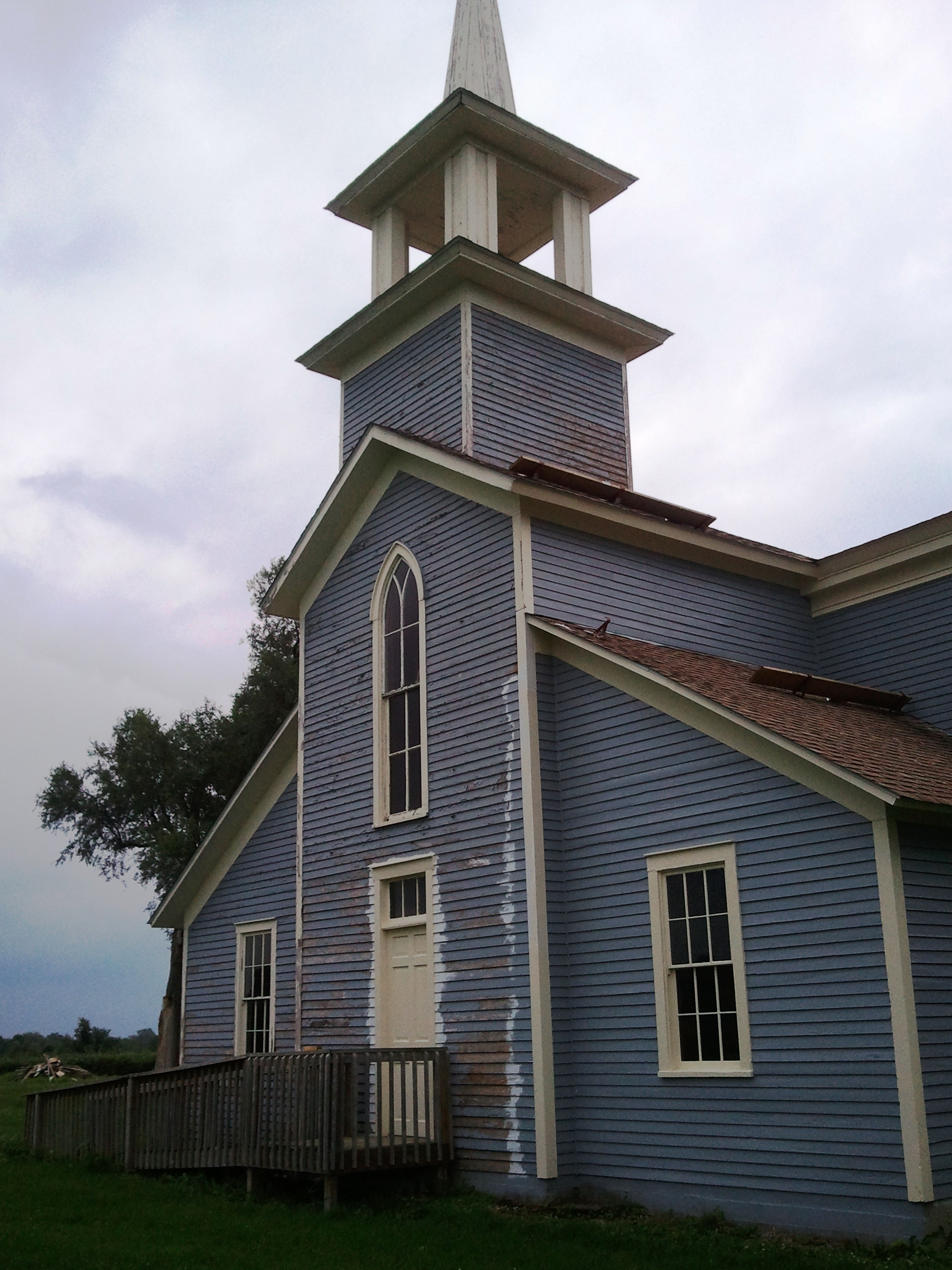

Location
- Highway 2, Davis County, IA; Troy, Iowa; USA

Information
- Motto: "Do Right Because it is Right"
- Established: 1853

Troy Academy was a school of higher education in the rural unincorporated community of Troy, which is located in Davis County, Iowa. It is on the National Register of Historic Places. It was founded in 1853 as a "seminary of learning" and operated through the Des Moines Presbytery and then independently. It was the first "normal school" teaching teachers in the newly created state of Iowa. In addition to training teachers, it also taught students hoping to become lawyers, doctors and eventually taught courses in business and accounting. Eventually, the Troy Academy became the high school of the Troy Independent School District in 1904. The school was for most of its history coeducational. The Troy Academy is undergoing renovations and is accessible to the public a few times per year and upon request.
