= Edgar N. Harwood =

American judge (1854–1936)

Edgar Nelson Harwood (December 5, 1854 – October 21, 1936) was a justice of the Montana Supreme Court from 1889 to 1895.

Born near Ellicottville, New York, Harwood received his law degree from the University of Illinois Urbana-Champaign. He went west with his father and brother to Deadwood, South Dakota, and from there went to a mining camp near Laramie, Wyoming. He was first admitted to the practice of law in the Territory of Wyoming and practiced at Laramie until 1882. After two years practicing in the mining camp, Harwood started north by horseback. He stopped in Buffalo, Wyoming, for a term of court, then continued riding up into the Territory of Montana. He camped for a day or so near Custer Battlefield, and then went on to Billings, Montana, where he arrived in July 1882.

Harwood was the first City Attorney for Billings. He also served as Deputy County Attorney in Billings when Miles City was a Territorial County Seat. He served in the fifteenth Territorial Legislative Assembly in 1887, and was elected Justice of the first Supreme Court of the State of Montana in 1889. He served until 1895, and thereafter made his home in Butte, Montana.

In 1918, he moved to Billings, where he resided until his death at the age of 82. Harwood's son, Ben Harwood, was elected a district judge of the Thirteenth Judicial District in 1936.

Political offices
Preceded by Newly established court	Justice of the Montana Supreme Court; 1889–1895	Succeeded by William Henry Hunt
