= Mike Wheat =

American judge

Micheal Wheat Honorable

Justice of the Montana Supreme Court
- In office 2010–2017
- Preceded by: John Warner (judge)
- Succeeded by: Ingrid Gustafson

Personal details
- Born: 1947 (age 78–79) Spokane, Washington, U.S.
- Party: Democratic
- Spouse: Debby
- Children: 4
- Education: University of Montana, Missoula (BA); University of Montana, Missoula (JD)

Military service
- Allegiance: United States of America
- Branch/service: United States Marine Corps

Mike Wheat (born 1947) was a justice of the Montana Supreme Court from 2010 to 2017. He was appointed to the court in 2010 by Governor Brian Schweitzer to fill the vacated seat of Justice John Warner.

== Background ==
Wheat was born in Spokane, Washington, in 1947. He served with the United States Marine Corps and fought in the Vietnam War from 1968 to 1969 and was awarded the Purple Heart. After the war Wheat attended the University of Montana and graduated with a BA in Political Science in 1975. He received his JD from the Alexander Blewett III School of Law at the University of Montana in 1978. After graduation he worked as a deputy county attorney in Butte, Montana until 1981, when he moved to Bozeman, Montana to start his own private law firm, Cok, Wheat & Kinzler.

Wheat was elected to the Montana State Senate and served two Legislative sessions from 2002 to 2005. In 2008 Wheat ran an unsuccessful primary for Montana state attorney general. Wheat was re-elected to the Montana Supreme Court in 2010 and 2014. In 2017, Wheat announced that he would retire at the end of the year to spend more time with his family. His successor on the Montana Supreme Court is Ingrid Gustafson.

== See also ==
- Dark Money (film)

Legal offices
Preceded by John Warner	Associate Justice of the Montana Supreme Court; 2010-2017	Succeeded by Ingrid Gustafson
