= Albert Anderson (Montana judge) =

American judge (1876–1948)

Albert Anderson (March 28, 1876 – October 17, 1948) was a justice of the Montana Supreme Court from 1941 to 1945.

Born in St. Croix County, Wisconsin, Anderson received an LL.B. degree from the University of Wisconsin–Madison in 1906, and moved to Glendive, Montana, in 1912. He served as the County Attorney for Dawson County, Montana, during World War I. In 1923, he moved to Billings, Montana. Anderson was elected to the Supreme Court in 1940 and served until 1945 when he lost his bid for re-election.

Anderson married Mabel M. Moran on June 10, 1914. He died in Helena, Montana, at the age of 72.

Political offices
Preceded by Ralph L. Arnold	Justice of the Montana Supreme Court; 1941–1945	Succeeded by Albert H. Angstman
