= Ralph J. Anderson =

American judge (1888–1962)

Ralph Justin Anderson (October 17, 1888 – August 8, 1962) was a justice of the Montana Supreme Court from 1933 to 1938.

== Biography ==
Born in Kinderhook, Illinois, Anderson received his law degree from the University of Colorado Law School in 1912, and later that year moved to Lewistown, Montana. Anderson was elected to the Montana House of Representatives for Fergus County, Montana, in 1914, and in 1917 was appointed deputy County Attorney for Fergus County.

During World War I, he was called to duty in the United States Army on June 30, 1918, and was sent to Vancouver Barracks, Washington. He was in the 25th Company Casual Detachment Signal C for about 5 weeks, the 15th Company Casual Detachment Spruce Production Division for 1 month, and the 144th Spruce Squadron in Joyce, Washington until his discharge as a private in January 1919. During this time, he served in the Aviation Section of the Army Signal Corps.

He was elected to the Montana Supreme Court in November 1932 and served until the end of 1938. He is credited with being the only attorney in the state to have argued four cases in one day before the Montana Supreme Court. He became a member of the State Board of Law Examiners in 1943 and was chair of that body from 1951 to 1962.

== Personal life and death ==
On February 24, 1919, he married Lauretta Kelly; they had no children. Anderson died August 8, 1962, in Helena, Montana, at the age of 73 and is buried at Resurrection Cemetery in Helena.

Political offices
Preceded by Sam C. Ford	Justice of the Montana Supreme Court; 1933–1938	Succeeded by Ralph L. Arnold
