= John Hurly =

American judge (1878–1949)

John Hurly (July 19, 1878 – June 10, 1949) was a justice of the Montana Supreme Court from 1919 to 1921.

== Education and career ==
Born in Berrien Springs, Michigan, Hurly studied law in the office of Judge Purcell in Wahpeton, North Dakota, and was admitted to the North Dakota bar in 1903. There, he served as court reporter to Judge W. S. Lauder. In 1905, Hurly became a secretary to Congressman Thomas Frank Marshall for two years, in Washington, D.C. After this, he moved to Minot, North Dakota, and engaged in the general practice of law.

In the fall of 1908, he moved to Glasgow, Montana, and served as the county attorney of Valley County, Montana, from 1911 to 1912. Hurly was elected district judge in November 1916 and served until 1919, when he was appointed associate justice of the Montana Supreme Court by Governor Sam V. Stewart, following an expansion of the number of justices by the legislature. He returned to his practice in Glasgow from 1921 until he was again elected district judge in 1928, serving from 1929 to 1948. Hurly was elected for another term in the fall of 1948, but failing health forced him to resign on December 31, 1948.

== Personal life and death ==
Hurly married Jeannette P. James in Saint Paul, Minnesota, on April 20, 1909, and they had two sons and three daughters. He died at his home in Glasgow, Montana, at the age of 70, after several months of poor health.

Political offices
| Preceded by Court reconfigured | Justice of the Montana Supreme Court; 1919–1921 | Succeeded by Albert J. Galen |
