= Frank B. Reynolds =

American judge (1874–1922)

Frank B. Reynolds (January 20, 1874 – May 25, 1922) was a justice of the Montana Supreme Court from 1921 until his death in 1922.

Born in Quincy, Michigan, Reynolds studied law at the University of Michigan and at his father's law firm. In 1895, he earned his law degree and became a co-partner with his father's firm. Reynolds stayed with his father for five years. In 1898, he enlisted to take part in the Spanish–American War. He was a probate judge in Michigan from 1901 to 1909, when he moved to Billings, Montana, to practice law.

In 1920, Reynolds was elected to the Montana Supreme Court, soundly defeating incumbent John A. Matthews, who was seeking reelection after having been appointed to the court the previous year.

Reynolds died at his home in Helena in 1922, following an illness of several months, survived by his wife and two daughters.

Political offices
Preceded by John A. Matthews	Justice of the Montana Supreme Court; 1921–1922	Succeeded by George W. Farr
