= William Trigg Pigott =

American judge (1860–1944)

William Trigg Pigott (November 3, 1860 – March 18, 1944) was a justice of the Montana Supreme Court from 1897 to 1902, and again in 1918.

Born in Boonville, Missouri, Pigott graduated from the Law Department of the University of Missouri in 1880 and then moved to Virginia City, Montana. Later in 1880, Justice Pigott was appointed City Attorney of Virginia City, and served for ten years. In 1890, he moved to Great Falls, Montana, to practice law. He was appointed to the Montana Supreme Court by Governor Robert Burns Smith to a seat vacated by the death of Justice Horace R. Buck. Pigott returned to practicing law in 1902 but was re-appointed to the Supreme Court by Governor Sam V. Stewart to replace Justice Sanner in 1918. In 1934, Governor Frank Henry Cooney appointed him to the 1st Judicial District to replace Judge Poorman. He served out the rest of the term and then resigned on December 3, 1934, to return to the private practice of law.

Pigott died in 1944, at the age of 84.

Political offices
Preceded by Horace R. Buck; Sydney Sanner	Justice of the Montana Supreme Court; 1897–1903; 1918-1918	Succeeded by William L. Holloway; Court reconfigured
