= Henry Warren (general) =

United States Air Force major general

Henry L. Warren
- Born: October 16, 1922 (age 103); Fayette, Missouri, US
- Allegiance: United States of America
- Branch: United States Air Force
- Service years: 1945–1975
- Rank: Major general
- Conflicts: World War II

Henry Lee Warren (born October 16, 1922) is a retired United States Air Force major general who served as deputy chief of staff, operations, Air Training Command.
