= Decius Wade =

American politician

Decius Spear Wade (January 23, 1835 – August 3, 1905) was an American attorney, judge, writer, and politician who has been called the "Father of Montana Jurisprudence" for his role in establishing the common law and statutory law of the U.S. state of Montana. He was a judge and state senator in Ohio before serving sixteen years as Chief Justice of the Montana Territorial Supreme Court. As a member of the post-statehood Code Commission, he was one of the main drafters of the Montana Code and the most vocal advocate in the state for codification.

== Early life and career in Ohio ==
Wade was born in Andover, Ohio, where he spent the early years of his life. He studied law in the office of his uncle Benjamin F. Wade, who was a U.S. Senator from 1851 to 1869. Vice President Schuyler Colfax married Ellen Maria Wade, his first cousin; Wade also became friends with future President James Garfield.

Wade was admitted to the bar in 1857, and in 1860 he was elected probate judge of Ashtabula County, a position he held for seven years. Wade married Bernice Galpin on June 3, 1863. In 1867, he was elected to a term in the Ohio Senate.

== On the Montana Territorial Supreme Court ==
Though he had no previous experience in the west, Wade was appointed the third Chief Justice of the Montana Territorial Supreme Court by President Ulysses S. Grant on March 14, 1871, and confirmed by the United States Senate on March 17. His sixteen-year tenure on that court was the longest served by any member. He was appointed to three more terms, serving on the court until 1887, when Newton W. McConnell was appointed as his successor by President Cleveland.

Wade authored roughly thirty percent of the court’s output during its 25-year history, writing 192 majority opinions, along with fourteen concurrences and dissents. His opinions often did not cite precedents, but instead simply explained a rule based on an applicable statute or simply through elaborated reasoning.

Territorial Supreme Court justices also served as trial judges until 1886, and in this capacity Wade sentenced a reported 500 men to prison and sent twelve to the gallows. An anecdote relates how Wade, trying to rid Friday of its nickname of the "hangman’s day," sentenced a murderer to be hanged on a Thursday instead. He explained, "I could not see but the fellow enjoyed it just as well as though Friday had been the day appointed, and I thought that poor abused Friday looked a little brighter the next morning."

While on the court, Wade authored a law-themed novel, Clare Lincoln, which was published in 1876 and achieved some popularity in the territory. In 1879, he wrote an article titled Self Government in the Territories, Int’l Rev. 229 (1879), in which he said that the territorial court's structure "made official life in the Territories" into "a personal warfare, which is neither pleasant to the officer nor beneficial to the people."

== Montana codification and later life ==
After leaving the court, Wade entered private practice in Helena as a partner in a law firm. Montana became a state on November 8, 1889, and from 1889 until 1895, Wade served as one of three Code Commissioners who were tasked with the codification of Montana law. The Commission produced four legal codes—Civil, Political, Procedure and Penal—to replace the volumes of session laws. These were reported to the Montana Legislature in 1892, though no action was taken at first due to political reasons as well as concerns of uncertainty and inconsistency inherent in codes. Wade, at that time one of the most prominent lawyers in the state, is considered to have been the most important advocate for codification. On April 5, 1894, he gave an address to the Helena Bar Association arguing for the adoption of the four codes. His speech was subsequently published as a pamphlet, Necessity for Codification. The Legislature adopted the codes the following year.

In addition to his private practice and support of codification, Wade continued to write. He contributed the chapters on law and the courts for An Illustrated History of the State of Montana by Joaquin Miller, a popular history of Montana published in 1894; Wade’s section was titled "The Bench and Bar 1880-1884." In 1895, Wade gave an address to the Montana Bar Association that was subsequently published as The Common Law.

Wade eventually returned to Ashtabula in Ohio, where he spent his last years.
