= Amy Eddy =

American judge

Associate Justice of the Montana Supreme Court
- Elect
- Assuming office January 2027
- Succeeding: Beth Baker

Personal details
- Born: 1975 (age 51) San Diego, California, U.S.
- Education: California Polytechnic State University, San Luis Obispo (BA); University of Montana (JD)

Amy Poehling Eddy (born 1975) is an American judge. She is an associate justice-elect of the Montana Supreme Court.

== Early life and education ==
Born in San Diego, California, Eddy grew up near Stanley, Idaho, where her family operated a lodge, and received a bachelor's degree in sociology from California Polytechnic State University in 1997. After graduating, she interned at the Idaho State Controller's Office, and subsequently received her J.D. from the University of Montana School of Law, graduating in 2001.

Legal offices
Preceded by Beth Baker	Justice of the Montana Supreme Court; Taking office 2027	Elect
