= Hugh R. Adair =

American judge (1889–1971)

Hugh R. Adair (August 29, 1889 – January 18, 1971) was a legislator, lieutenant governor, and justice of the Montana Supreme Court, United States. He served on the court as associate justice from 1943 to 1946, as chief justice from 1947 to 1956, and again as an associate justice from 1957 until 1968.

Adair was born in Trego County, Kansas. He graduated from the University of Kansas at Lawrence in 1913 with an LL.B and was admitted to the State Bar of Montana on January 26, 1914.

He served in the Tank Corps during World War I.

Adair was elected to the Montana House of Representatives in 1927 and 1931. He took office as lieutenant governor in 1937, serving until 1941. In Montana, the lieutenant governor also serves as President of the Senate.

He was elected in 1942 to the Supreme Court as an associate justice and became chief justice in 1947. He served in that capacity until January 7, 1957 when he chose to return to Associate Justice status because, due to the salary structure of the court, the pay would be $2,000 more per year than continuing as chief justice. He remained at that status until his retirement in 1968.

He died in a hospital in Helena, Montana at 81 years old.

== See also ==
- List of justices of the Montana Supreme Court

Political offices
Preceded by	Associate Justice of the Montana Supreme Court; 1943–1946	Succeeded by I. W. Choate
Preceded by Albert H. Angstman	Chief Justice of the Montana Supreme Court; 1947-1956	Succeeded by James T. Harrison
Preceded by	Associate Justice of the Montana Supreme Court; 1957-1968	Succeeded by
