= Bibliography of Montana history =

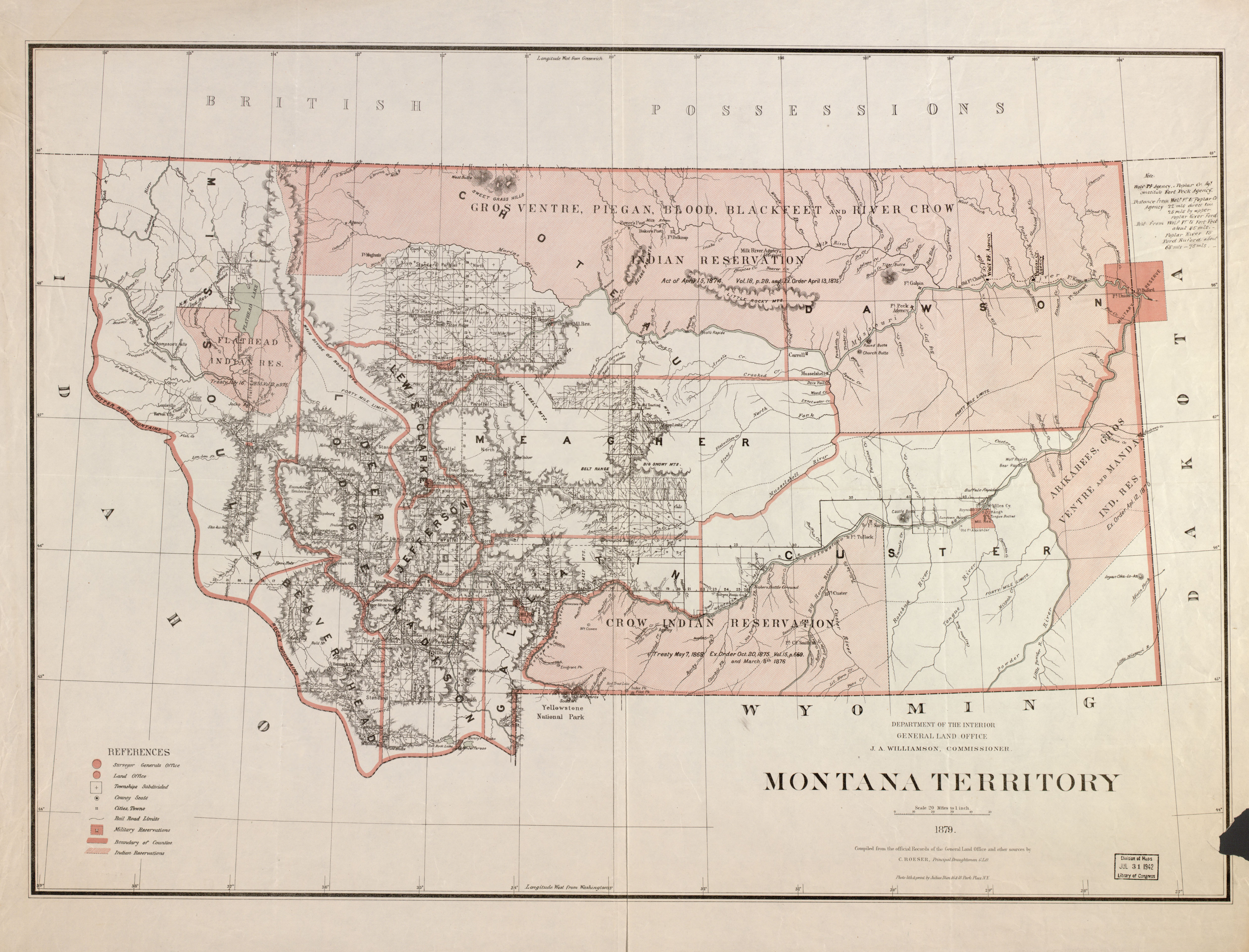
Montana Territory, 1879

The following works deal with the cultural, political, economic, military, biographical and geologic history of pre-territorial Montana, Montana Territory and the State of Montana.

== General works in Montana history ==
- Aarstad, Rich; Arguimbau, Ellie; Baumler, Ellen; Porsild, Charlene; Shovers, Brian (2009). Montana Place Names From Alzada to Zortman. Helena, MT: Montana Historical Society Press.
- Bancroft, Hubert Howe (1890). The History of Washington, Idaho and Montana (1845-1889) Vol XXXI. San Francisco, CA: The History Company.
- Burlingame, Merrill G.; Toole, K. Ross (1957). A History of Montana (3 vols. ed.). New York, NY: Lewis Historical Pub. Co.
- Cheney, Roberta Carteek (1984). Names on the Face of Montana. Missoula, Montana: Mountain Press. ISBN 0-87842-150-5.
- Egan, Ken Jr. (2014). Montana 1864-Indians, Emigrants and Gold in the Territorial Year. Helena, Montana: Riverbend Publishing. ISBN 9781606390764.
- Fogarty, Kate Hammond (1916). The Story of Montana. New York: A. S. Barnes Company.
- Fritz, Harry (2002). Murphy, Mary; Robert Swartout (eds.). Montana Legacy: Essays on History, People, and Place. Montana Historical Society Press. ISBN 978-0-917298-90-5.
- Graetz, Rick; Graetz, Susie (2003). This is Montana-A Geography-Geographic History of Montana. Helena, MT: Northern Rockies Publishing. ISBN 1891152181.
- Hamilton, James McClellan (1957). From Wilderness to Statehood: A History of Montana, 1805-1900. Bindfords & Mort. Archived from the original on 2012-07-26 – via Questia.
- Howard, Joseph Kinsey (2003) [1943]. Montana: High, Wide, and Handsome. Lincoln, NE: University of Nebraska Press. Archived from the original on 2012-07-29 – via Questia.
- Howard, Joseph Kinsey, ed. (1946). Montana Margins-a state anthology. New Haven, CT: Yale University Press.
- Judson, Katherine Berry (1912). Montana-Land of Shining Mountains (PDF). Chicago, IL: A. C. McClurg & Co.
- Leeson, Michael A. (1885). History of Montana, 1739-1885. A History Of Its Discovery And Settlement, Social And Commercial Progress, Mines And Miners, Agriculture And Stock-Growing, Schools And Societies, Indians And Indian Wars, Vigilantes, Courts Justice, Newspaper Press, Navigation, Railroads And Statistics, Histories Of Counties, Cities, Villages And Mining Camps; Also, Personal Reminiscences Of Great Historic Value; Views Of The Territory In Our Times, And Portraits Of Pioneers And Representative Men In The Professions And Trades. Chicago: Warner Beers and Company. Archived from the original on 2011-09-29.
- MacDonald, Douglas H. (2012). Montana Before History-11,000 Years of Hunter-Gatherers in the Rockies and Plains. Missoula, MT: Mountain Press Publishing Company. ISBN 978-0878425853.
- Malone, Michael P.; Roeder, Richard B.; Lang, William L. (1991). Montana-A History of Two Centuries. Seattle, WA: University of Washington Press. ISBN 0-295-97129-0., the standard scholarly history
- Miller, Joaquin (1894). An Illustrated History of the State of Montana Containing a History of the State of Montana from the Earliest Period of the Discovery to the Present Time, Together With Glimpses of its Auspicious Future, Illustrations and Full-Page Portraits of Some of it (PDF). Chicago: The Lewis Publishing Co.
- Montana Historical Society, ed. (1976). Not In Precious Metals Alone-A Manuscript History of Montana. Helena, MT: Montana Historical Society. ISBN 0917298012.
- Pace, JNO W.; Mock, H.W., eds. (1891). The Montana Bluebook-Biographical, Historical and Statistic book of reference. Helena, Montana: Journal Publishing.
- Robison, Ken (2013). Montana Territory and the Civil War: A Frontier Forged on the Battlefield. Charleston, SC: The History Press. ISBN 978-1626191754.
- Sanders, Helen Fitzgerald (1913). A History of Montana (PDF). Chicago and New York: The Lewis Publishing Company.
- Smith, Duane A. Rocky Mountain Heartland: Colorado, Montana, and Wyoming in the 20th Century (2008) 305pp
- Stout, Tom (1921). Montana Its Story and Biography--A History of Aboriginal and Territorial Montana and Three Decade of Statehood (PDF). Chicago: American Historical Society.
- Toole, K. Ross (1959). Montana: An Uncommon Land. University of Oklahoma Press. ISBN 0-8061-1890-3., classic populist history from longtime University of Montana professor of History.
- Toole, K. Ross (1983). 20th Century Montana: A State of Extremes. University of Oklahoma Press. ISBN 978-0-8061-1826-0., update to Toole's previous works.
- WPA Federal Writers Project. Montana: A State Guide Book (Viking Press, 1939) classic guide to history, culture and every town online free

=== Chronologies ===
- Parry, Ellis Robert (2001). Montana Dateline. Guilford, CT: Globe Pequot Press. ISBN 156044956X.
- Smith, Jeffrey J. (2003). Montana Book of Days-365 Days-365 Stories-The Short Course in Montana History. Missoula, MT: Historic Montana Publishing. ISBN 0966335562.

=== Periodicals ===
- "Contributions Vol. 1". Contributions to the Historical Society of Montana. 1. 1876.
- "Contributions Vol. 2". Contributions to the Historical Society of Montana. 2. 1896.
- "Contributions Vol. 3". Contributions to the Historical Society of Montana. 3. 1900.
- "Contributions Vol. 4". Contributions to the Historical Society of Montana. 4. 1903.
- "Contributions Vol. 5". Contributions to the Historical Society of Montana. 5. 1904.
- "Contributions Vol. 6". Contributions to the Historical Society of Montana. 6. 1907.
- "Contributions Vol. 7". Contributions to the Historical Society of Montana. 7. 1910.
- "Contributions Vol. 8". Contributions to the Historical Society of Montana. 8. 1917.
- "Contributions Vol. 9". Contributions to the Historical Society of Montana. 9. 1923.
- "Contributions Vol. 10". Contributions to the Historical Society of Montana. 10. 1940.
- "Montana The Magazine of Western History". Montana The Magazine of Western History. Helena, MT: Montana Historical Society., published 1951–present.

== Agriculture, ranching, and rural life ==
- Bishop, John F. (April 1951). "Beginning of the Montana Sheep Industry". The Montana Magazine of History. 1 (2): 3, 5–8. JSTOR 4515725.
- Burlingame, Merrill G. (1974). "15, The Agricultural Frontier in Montana". The Montana Frontier (Reprint ed.). Bozeman, MT: Big Sky Books. pp. 333–354., originally published in 1942.
- Clay, T. A. (Autumn 2008). "A Call to Order: Law, Violence, and the Development of Montana's Early Stockmen's Organizations". Montana The Magazine of Western History. 58 (3): 48–63, 95–96. JSTOR 25485736.
- Clayton, John (Summer 2006). "Caroline Lockhart on the Dryhead: 'Happily-Ever-Aftering' on a Montana Cattle Ranch" (PDF). Montana The Magazine of Western History. 56 (2): 58–64.
- Edwards, Douglas M. (Summer 1999). "Show Windows of the West: Exhibitionary Complexes and the Promotion of Montana's Agricultural Possibilities". Agricultural History. 73 (3): 322–348. JSTOR 3744174.
- Elofson, Warren M. (2004). Frontier Cattle Ranching in the Land and Times of Charlie Russell. Seattle, WA: University of Washington Press.
- Elofson, Warren (Autumn 2005). "An Exceedingly Dicey Business: Frontier Horse Ranching on the Northern Great Plains". Agricultural History. 79 (4): 462–477. doi:10.1525/ah.2005.79.4.462. JSTOR 3745166. S2CID 161679191.
- Fletcher, Robert H. (1960). Free Grass to Fences: The Montana Cattle Range Story. New York, NY: University Publishers.
- Fletcher, Robert S. (Sep 1929). "The End of the Open Range in Eastern Montana". Mississippi Valley Historical Review. 16 (2): 188–211. doi:10.2307/1902901. JSTOR 1902901.
- Fletcher, Robert S. (Oct 1930). "That Hard Winter in Montana, 1886-1887". Agricultural History. 4 (4): 123–130. JSTOR 3739414.
- Gilles, T. J. (1977). When Tillage Begins: A History of Agriculture in Montana. Laurel, MT: UMP.
- Grant, Frank R. (1984). "To Husband the Land: Robert Sutherlin and the Irrigation-Dry Farming Controversy". In Myers, Rex C.; Fritz, Harry W. (eds.). Montana and the West: Essays in Honor of K. Ross Toole. Boulder, CO: Pruett Publishing Co. pp. 87–104.
- Hargreaves, Mary Wilma (1957). Dry Farming in the Northern Great Plains, 1900-1925. Cambridge, MA: Harvard University Press.
- Kennedy, Michael S., ed. (1964). Cowboys and Cattlemen: A Roundup. New York: Hastings House.
- Malone, Michael P.; Roeder, Richard B. (Spring 1975). "1876 in Field and Pasture: Agriculture". Montana The Magazine of Western History. 25 (2): 28–35. JSTOR 4517977.
- Mercier, Laurie (Autumn 1988). "Women's Role in Montana Agriculture: 'You Had to Make Every Minute Count'". Montana The Magazine of Western History. 38 (4): 50–61. JSTOR 4519173.
- Pace, Dick (Winter 1979). "Henry Sieben: Pioneer Montana Stockman". Montana The Magazine of Western History. 29 (1): 2–15. JSTOR 4518350.
- Smith, Phyllis (Spring 2002). "Isabelle Randall and the 'Natives'". Montana The Magazine of Western History. 52 (1): 66–71. JSTOR 4520397.
- Strom, Claire (Summer 1997). "The Great Northern Railway and Dryland Farming in Montana". Railroad History (176): 80–102.
- Stuart, Leland E. (Winter 1988). "The Winter of 1886-1887: The Last of Whose 5,000?". Montana The Magazine of Western History. 38 (1): 32–41. JSTOR 4519114.
- Ward, Ralph E. (Autumn 1975). "Wheat in Montana: Determined Adaptation". Montana The Magazine of Western History. 25 (4): 16–37. JSTOR 4518021.

== Biography ==
- Adams, Ramon F.; Home E. Britzman (1948). Charles M. Russell: The Cowboy Artist - A Biography. Pasadena, California: Trail's End Publishing.
- Athearn, Robert G. (1949). Thomas Francis Meagher, An Irish Revolutionary in America. Boulder, CO: University of Colorado Press.
- Bates, J. Leonard. "Walsh, Thomas James"; American National Biography Online 2000
- Bates, J. Leonard (1999). Senator Thomas J. Walsh of Montana: Law and Public Affairs from TR to FDR. Urbana, IL: University of Illinois Press.
- Crawford, Don L.; Crawford, Melinda Blanchard (Winter 2010). "Just a Name on a Grave?: Discovering the Story of an Unknown Montana Miner". Montana The Magazine of Western History. 60 (4): 50–61, 95–96. JSTOR 27922549.
- Graybill, Andrew R. (2013). The red and the white : a family saga of the American West. New York: W. W. Norton. ISBN 978-0871404459.
- Hanna, Warren L. (1988). Stars over Montana-Men Who Made Glacier National Park History. West Glacier, MT: Glacier Natural History Association. ISBN 978-0-09-167906-4.
- Hanna, Warren L. (1986). The Life and Times of James Willard Schultz (Apikuni). Norman, Oklahoma: University of Oklahoma Press. ISBN 0-8061-1985-3.
- James, Jon G. (Winter 2009). "Lt. James H. Bradley: The Literary Legacy of Montana's Frontier Soldier-Historian". Montana The Magazine of Western History. 59 (4): 46–57. JSTOR 40544016.
- Johnson, Jeffrey A. (Fall 2012). "One of the Most Charming of Men". Journal of the West. 51 (4): 60–66., on William Scallon of the Anaconda Company.
- Karlin, Jules A. "Dixon, Joseph Moore" American National Biography Online (2000) online
- Lang, William L. (Summer 1989). "Charles A. Broadwater and the Main Chance in Montana". Montana The Magazine of Western History. 39 (3): 30–36. JSTOR 4519233.
- Lind, Robert W. (1992). Brother Van: Montana pioneer circuit rider. Helena, MT: SkyHouse Publishers/Falcon Press Publishers.
- Linderman, Frank Bird (1962). Plenty Coups, chief of the Crows. Lincoln, NE: University of Nebraska Press., originally published in 1930.
- Linderman, Frank Bird (1960). Pretty-Shield, medicine woman of the Crows. New York: Harper & Row., originally published in 1935.
- Lopach, James; Luckowski, Jean (2005). Jeannette Rankin: A political woman. University Press of Colorado. ISBN 978-0-87081-812-7.
- Lucey, Donna M. (2001). Photographing Montana, 1894-1928: The life and work of Evelyn Cameron. Missoula, Montana: Mountain Press Publishing. ISBN 0-87842-425-3.
- Milner, Clyde A. II; O'Conner, Carol A. (2008). As big as the West: The pioneer life of Granville Stuart. New York: Oxford University Press. ISBN 978-0-19-512709-6.
- Morrison, John; Morrison, Catherine Wright (2003). Mavericks: The lives and battles of Montana's political legends. Helena: Montana Historical Society Press. ISBN 978-0917298936., first published in 1997; chapters on Joseph K. Toole, Ella Knowles, Joseph M. Dixon, Thomas J. Walsh, Jeannette Rankin, Burton K. Wheeler, James E. Murray, Mike Mansfield, and Lee Metcalf
- Newell, Alan S. (Summer 2001). "'Home is What You Can Take Away with You': K. Ross Toole and the Making of a Public Historian". The Public Historian. 23 (3): 63–71. doi:10.1525/tph.2001.23.3.63. JSTOR 10.1525/tph.2001.23.3.63.
- Progressive Men of the State of Montana (PDF). Chicago: A.W. Bowen and Co. 1900.
- Petersen, Keith C. (2014). John Mullan-The Tumultuous Life of a Western Road Builder. Pullman, WA: Washington State Univ Press. ISBN 978-0874223217.
- Robison, Ken (2013). Montana Territory and the Civil War : a frontier forged on the battlefield. Charleston, SC: The History Press. ISBN 978-1626191754.
- Robison, Ken (2014). Confederates in Montana Territory: In the shadow of Price's army. Charleston, SC: The History Press.
- Ruetten, Richard T. Burton K. Wheeler, 1905-1925, an independent liberal under fire (1957) 418pp; vol 1 of standard biography; Burton K. Wheeler of Montana: a progressive between the wars (1961) - 662 pages; vol. 2
- Scott, Kim Allen (2007). Yellowstone denied: The life of Gustavus Cheyney Doane. Norman, OK: University of Oklahoma Press. ISBN 978-0-8061-3800-8.
- Shirley, Gayle C. (1995). More than petticoats: Remarkable Montana women. Helena, Mont.: Falcon Publishing. ISBN 978-1560443636.
- Steele, Volney (2002). Wellington Rankin : his family, life and times : Montana attorney, politician, cattleman, land baron. Bozeman, Mont.: Bridger Creek Historical Press. ISBN 978-1888550108.
- Stevenson, Elizabeth (1994). Figures in a Western landscape : men and women of the northern Rockies. Baltimore: Johns Hopkins University Press. ISBN 978-0801846762.
- Wostrel, Linda, ed. (2001). Dreams across the divide: Stories of Montana pioneers. Stevensville, MT: Stoneydale Press Publishing Company. ISBN 1931291136.

=== Memoirs and autobiography ===
- Abbott, E.C. ("Teddy Blue") (1939). We Pointed Them North: Recollections of a Cowpuncher. New York: Farrar & Rinehart.
- Bell, Margaret (2002). Blew, Mary Clearman (ed.). When Montana and I were young : a frontier childhood. Lincoln, Neb.: Univ. of Nebraska Press. ISBN 0803213255.
- Blew, Mary Clearman (2001). All but the waltz : a memoir of five generations in the life of a Montana family. Norman: University of Oklahoma Press. ISBN 080613321X.
- Bonney, Orrin H.; Bonney, Lorraine (1970). Battle Drums and Geysers-The Life and Journals Of Lt. Gustavus Cheyney Doane, Soldier and Explorer of the Yellowstone and Snake River Regions. Chicago: Swallow Press.
- Crawford, Lewis F. (1926). Rekindling Camp Fires-The Exploits of Ben Arnold (Connor)-An authentic narrative of sixty years in the old West as an Indian Fighter, Gold Miner, Cowboy, Hunter, and Army Scout. Bismarck, ND: Capital Book Co.
- Gray, Donna (2012). Nothing to tell : extraordinary stories of Montana ranch women. Guilford, Conn.: TwoDot. ISBN 978-0762779093.
- Kittredge, William (1992). Hole in the sky : a memoir. New York: Alfred A. Knopf. ISBN 978-0679411666.
- McLaughlin, Ruth (2010). Bound like grass : a memoir from the western high plains. Norman, Okla.: University of Oklahoma Press. ISBN 978-0806141374.
- Mogen, David (2011). Honyocker dreams: Montana memories. Lincoln: University of Nebraska Press. ISBN 978-0803225183.
- Quaife, M.M., ed. (1926). Yellowstone Kelly-The Memoirs of Luther S. Kelly. New Haven, CT: Yale University Press.
- Randall, Isabelle (2004). Saunders, Richard L. (ed.). A lady's ranch life in Montana. Norman, OK: University of Oklahoma Press., originally published in 1887.
- Ronan, Mary (2003). Baumler, Ellen (ed.). Girl from the gulches : the story of Mary Ronan as told to Margaret Ronan. Helena: Montana Historical Society Press. ISBN 978-0917298974., originally published in 1932.
- Stuart, Granville (1925). Forty Years On The Frontier as seen in the Journals and Reminiscences of Granville Stuart Gold-Miner, Trader, Merchant, Rancher and Politician. Cleveland, OH: The Arthur H. Clark Company.
- Wheeler, Burton K. Yankee from the West: The candid, turbulent life story of the Yankee-born U.S. Senator from Montana (1962), autobiography

== Business, economics, and industry ==
- Davis, Shirley L., ed. (1993). Gold Dust to Dollars-A History of Federal Tax Administration in Montana 1863-1993 (PDF). Helena, Montana: Internal Revenue Service.
- Glasscock, C.B. (1935). The War of the Copper Kings. New York: Grosset and Dunlap.
- Groth, Clarence W. "Sowing and Reaping: Montana Banking, 1910-1925," Montana, Dec 1970, Vol. 20 Issue 4, pp 28–35
- Klassen, Henry C. "The Early Growth of the Conrad Banking Enterprise in Montana, 1880-1914," Great Plains Quarterly, Jan 1997, Vol. 17 Issue 1, pp 49–62
- Kutzman, John Andrew. "Death of a Small Business: The Missoula Brewing Company," Montana, March 1988, Vol. 38 Issue 1, pp 54–61
- Lonnquist, Lois (2006). Fifty Cents an Hour: The Builders and Boomtowns of the Fort Peck Dam. Helena, Montana: MtSky Press. ISBN 0-9786963-0-1.
- Morris, Patrick F. (1997). Anaconda Montana: Copper Smelting Boomtown on the Western Frontier. Bethesda, MD: Swann Publishing. ISBN 0-9657209-2-6.
- Walter, Dave. "Simon Pepin, A Quiet Capitalist," Montana March 1989, Vol. 39 Issue 1, pp 34–38
- West, Carroll Van. "Marcus Daly and Montana: One Man's Imprint on the Land," Montana Mar 1987, Vol. 37 Issue 1, pp 60–62

== Historic expeditions ==
- Engelmann, George; Forwood, William Henry; Gray, Asa; Gregory, James F.; Sheridan, Philip Henry (1882). Report of an exploration of parts of Wyoming, Idaho, and Montana in August and September, 1882 /made by Lieut. Gen. P. H. Sheridan, commanding the Military division of the Missouri, with the itinerary of Col. Jas. F. Gregory, and a geological and botanical report by W. H. Forwood (PDF). Washington D.C.: U.S. Government Printing Office.
- Work, John (1923). Lewis, William S.; Paul C. Phillips (eds.). The Journal Of John Work, A Chief Trader Of The Hudson's Bay Co., During His Expedition From Vancouver To The Flatheads And Blackfeet Of The Pacific Northwest. Cleveland: The Arthur H. Clark Company.

=== Lewis and Clark Expedition (1804-1806) ===
- Ambrose, Stephen E. (1996). Undaunted Courage. New York: Simon & Schuster. ISBN 0-684-81107-3.

=== Cook, Folsom, Peterson Expedition (1869) ===
- Cook, Charles W.; Folsom, Dave E.; Peterson, William (1965). Haines, Aubrey L. (ed.). The Valley of the Upper Yellowstone-An Exploration of the Headwaters of the Yellowstone River in the Year 1869. Norman, OK: University of Oklahoma Press.

=== Washburn, Langford, Doane Expedition (1870) ===
- Langford, Nathaniel P. (May–June 1871). "The Wonders of the Yellowstone". Scribner's Monthly. II (1–2).
- Everts, Truman C. (November 1871). "Thirty-seven Days of Peril". Scribner's Monthly. III (1).
- The report of Lieutenant Gustavus C. Doane upon the so-called Yellowstone Expedition of 1870, presented to the Secretary of War, February 1871
- The Washburn Yellowstone Expedition, accounts of Trumbull published in the Overland Monthly, Vol 6, No 5-6, May–June 1871
- Hedges, Cornelius (1904). "Journal of Judge Cornelius Hedges, Member of the "Washburn Expedition of 1870"". Contributions to the Historical Society of Montana. V: 370–394.
- Langford, Nathaniel Pitt (1905). The Discovery of Yellowstone Park; Diary of the Washburn Expedition to the Yellowstone and Firehole Rivers in the Year 1870. St. Paul, MN: Frank Jay Haynes.

=== Hayden Geological Survey (1871) ===
- Hayden, F. V. (1880). The Great West: Its Attractions and Resources, Containing a Popular Description of the Marvelous Scenery, Physical Geography, Fossils and Glaciers of the Wonderful Region, And the Recent Explorations of the Yellowstone Park, "The Wonderland of America". Bloomington, IL: Charles R. Brodix.
- Merrill, Marlene Deahl, ed. (1999). Yellowstone and the Great West-Journals, Letters and Images from the 1871 Hayden Expedition. Lincoln, NE: University of Nebraska Press. ISBN 0-8032-3148-2.

== Labor and working class ==
- Calvert, Jerry W. (1988). The Gibraltar: Socialism and Labor in Butte, Montana. Helena, Montana: Montana Historical Society Press. ISBN 0-917298-14-4.
- Jensen, Vernon H. (1950). Heritage of Conflict: Labor Relations in the Nonferrous Metals Industry up to 1930. Ithaca, New York: Cornell University Press.

== Indians ==
- Bigart, Robert. Getting Good Crops: Economic and Diplomatic Survival Strategies of the Montana Bitterroot Salish Indians, 1870-1891 (Civilization of the American Indian Series, Vol. 266) (2010)
- Bryan, William L. Montana's Indians: Yesterday and Today (Montana Geographic Series) (1995) excerpt and text search
- Hoebel, E. Adamson. The Cheyennes: Indians of the Great Plains (1978)
- Lopach, James J. et al. Tribal Government Today: Politics on Montana Indian Reservations (2nd ed. 1998)
- Lowie, Robert H. The Crow Indians (U. of Nebraska Press, 1983)

=== Military histories ===
- Fifer, Barbara. Montana Battlefields 1806-1877: Native Americans And the U.S. Army at War (2005) excerpt and text search
- Goodrich, Thomas. (1997). Scalp Dance: Indian Warfare on the High Plains, 1865-1879. Mechanicsburg, PA: Stackpole Books. ISBN 0-8117-1523-X.
- Gray, John S. (1993). Custer's Last Campaign: Mitch Boyer and the Little Bighorn Remembered. University of Nebraska Press. ISBN 0-8032-7040-2.
- Greene, Jerome A. (2000). Nez Perce Summer-The U.S. Army and the Nee-Me-Poo Crisis. Helena, MT: Montana Historical Society Press. ISBN 0-917298-68-3.
- Glynn, Gary (2012). Montana's Home Front During World War II]. Missoula, MT: Big Elk Books. ISBN 9780983839002.
- Glynn, Gary (2013). That Beautiful Little Post: the Story of Fort Missoula]. Missoula, MT: Big Elk Books. ISBN 978-0-9838390-2-6.
- Hampton, Bruce (1994). Children of Grace-The Nez Perce War of 1877. New York: Henry Holt and Company. ISBN 0-8050-1991-X.
- Koury, Michael J. (1970). Military Posts of Montana. Bellevue, NE: The Old Army Press.
- Marshall, Joseph M. III. (2007). The Day the World Ended at Little Bighorn: A Lakota History. New York: Viking Press. ISBN 978-0-670-03853-4.
- Michno, Gregory F. (1997). Lakota Noon: The Indian Narrative of Custer's Defeat. Missoula, Montana: Mountain Press Publishing Company. ISBN 0-87842-349-4.
- Perrett, Bryan (1993). Last Stand: Famous Battles Against the Odds. London: Arms & Armour. ISBN 1-85409-188-3.
- Scott, Douglas D.; Richard A. Fox; Melissa A. Connor; Dick Harmon. (1989). Archaeological Perspectives on the Battle of the Little Bighorn. University of Oklahoma Press. ISBN 0-8061-3292-2.
- Upton, Richard, ed. (1973). Fort Custer on The Big Horn 1877-1898. Glendale, CA: Arthur H. Clark Co.
- Welch, James; Stekler, Paul (2007). Killing Custer: The Battle of Little Bighorn and the Fate of the Plains Indians. New York: W.W. Norton & Company. ISBN 978-0-393-32939-1.
- West, Elliott (2009). The last Indian war : the Nez Perce story. Oxford: Oxford University Press. ISBN 978-0-19-513675-3.

=== Primary sources ===
- Finerty, J.F. (1890). War-path and bivouac: or, The conquest of the Sioux: a narrative of stirring personal experiences and adventures in the Big Horn and Yellowstone expedition of 1876, and in the campaign on the British border, in 1879. Donohue Brothers.
- Miles, Nelson A. (1896). Personal Reflections and Observations of Nelson A. Miles. Chicago: The Werner Company.

== Local and regional histories ==
- An Illustrated History of The Yellowstone Valley-Embracing The Counties of Park, Sweet Grass, Carbon, Yellowstone, Rosebud, Custer And Dawson, State Of Montana (PDF). Spokane, Washington: Western Historical Publishing Company. 1907.
- Brown, Mark H. (1961). Plainsmen of the Yellowstone-A History of the Yellowstone Basin. Omaha, NE: University of Nebraska Press.
- Carlile, Marie, ed. (1979). The Smith River Journal, A History From Lews & Clark to 1979, Cascade & Meagher Counties, Montana. Great Falls, MT: Smith River Historical Society.
- Freeman, Harry C. (1900). A brief History of Butte, Montana-The World's Greatest Mining Camp (PDF). Chicago: The Henry O. Shepard Co.
- Gloege, Marvin E. Survival or gradual extinction: the small town in the Great Plains of eastern Montana (Meadowlark Publishing Services, 2007)
- Johnson, Dorothy M. (1971). The Bloody Bozeman-The Perilous Trail to Montana's Gold. New York: McGraw-Hill Book Company. ISBN 0-87842-152-1.
- LaDow, Beth (2001). The Medicine Line-Life and Death on a North American Borderline. New York: Routledge. ISBN 0-415-92764-1.
- Mercier, Mercier (2001). Anaconda: Labor, Community, and Culture in Montana's Smelter City. Champaign, IL: University of Illinois Press. ISBN 0-252-06988-9.
- Mercier, Laurie K. "'The Stack Dominated Our Lives': Metals Manufacturing In Four Montana Communities," Montana June 1988, Vol. 38 Issue 2, pp 40–57
- Rees, Tony (2008). Arc of the Medicine Line. Lincoln, Nebraska: University of Nebraska Press. ISBN 978-0-8032-1791-1.
- Smith, Phyllis (1996). Bozeman and the Gallatin Valley. A History. Helena, MT: Falcon Press Publishers. ISBN 1-56044-540-8.
- Speck, Virginia Lee (1946). The History of the Deer Lodge Valley to 1870. Bozeman, MT: Montana State University.
- Turner, C. Frank (1973). Across the Medicine Line. Toronto, Ontario: McClellan and Stewart. ISBN 0-7710-8616-4.
- Van West, Carroll (1993). Capitalism on the Frontier: Billings and the Yellowstone Valley in the Nineteenth Century. Omaha, NE: University of Nebraska Press. Archived from the original on 2012-07-21 – via Questia.
- Vichorek, Daniel N. (1993). The Hi-Line, Profiles of a Montana Land. Helena, Montana: American World and Geographic Publishing. ISBN 1-56037-021-1.
- WPA Federal Writers Project (1939). Montana: A State Guide Book. Viking Press. Archived from the original on 2012-06-28 – via Questia.

=== Law and order ===
- Allen, Frederick (2005). Decent, Orderly Lynching: The Montana Vigilantes. Norman, OK: University of Oklahoma Press. ISBN 0-8061-3651-0.
- Dimsdale, Thomas J. (1915). The Vigilantes of Montana-or Popular Justice in the Rocky Mountains. Helena, MT: State Publishing.
- Dillon, Mark C. (2013). Montana Vigilantes 1863-1870 Gold, Guns and Gallows. Logan, UT: Utah State University Press. ISBN 9780874219197.
- Crosley, Donald E. (2013). Hang 'Em: Montana Vigilantes Vs. Henry Plummer. Self published.

=== Ghost towns ===
- Baker, Don (1997). Ghost Towns of the Montana Prairie. Boulder, CO: Fred Pruett Books. ISBN 0-87108-050-8.
- Fifer, Barbara (2002). Montana Mining Ghost Towns. Helena, Montana: Farcountry Press. ISBN 1-56037-195-1.
- Johnson, Virginia Weisel. "Tough Taft: Boom Town." Montana Dec 1982, Vol. 32 Issue 4, pp 50–57
- Miller, Don C. (1982). Ghost Towns of Montana. Boulder, Colorado: Pruett Publishing. ISBN 0-87108-606-9.
- Whitfield, William W. (2007). Montana Ghost Towns and Gold Camps - A Pictorial Guide. Stevensville, Montana: Stoneydale Press Publishing Co. ISBN 978-1-931291-38-5.

=== Primary sources ===
- Langford, Nathaniel Pitt (1893). Vigilante Days and Ways-The Pioneers of the Rockies (PDF). New York: D. D. Merrill.
- Murphy, Jerre C. (1912). The comical history of Montana : a serious story for free people : being an account of the conquest of America's treasure state by alien corporate combine, the confiscation of its resources, the subjugation of its people, and the corruption of free government to the uses of lawless enterprise and organized greed employed in "big business" (PDF). San Diego, CA: E. L. Scofield Publishers.
- Strahorn, Robert E. (1881). Montana and Yellowstone National Park-Facts and Experiences on the Farming, Stock Raising, Mining, Lumbering, and Other Industries of Montana, and Notes on the Climate, Scenery, Game, Fish and Mineral Springs, With Full and Reliable Data on Routes, Distances, Rates of Fare, Expenses of Living, Wages, School and Church Privileges, Society, Means of Acquiring Homes, and Other Valuable and Reliable Information, Applicable to the Wants of the Capitalist, Homeseeker, or Tourist. Kansas City: Ramsey, Millet & Hudson.

== Political histories ==
- Colde, Judith K. "A Wide Field for Usefulness: Women's Civil Status and the Evolution of Women's Suffrage on the Montana Frontier, 1864-1914," American Journal of Legal History, July 1990, Vol. 34 Issue 3, pp 262–294
- Lemon, Greg. Blue Man in a Red State: Montana's Governor Brian Schweitzer and the New Western Populism (2008), popular
- Lopach, James (1983). We the People of Montana: The Workings of a Popular Government. Mountain Press. ISBN 978-0-87842-154-1.
- Malone, Michael P. "The Montana New Dealers," in John Braeman et al. eds. The New Deal: Volume Two - the State and Local Levels (1975) pp 240–68
- Morrison, John, and Catherine Wright Morrison. Mavericks: The Lives and Battles of Montana's Political Legends (2003), chapters on Joseph K. Toole, Ella Knowles, Joseph M. Dixon, Thomas Walsh, Jeannette Rankin, Burton K. Wheeler, James E. Murray, Mike Mansfield, and Lee Metcalf
- O'Keane, Josephine. Thomas J. Walsh: A Senator from Montana(1955) online edition
- McDonald, Verlaine Stoner (2010). The red corner : the rise and fall of communism in northeastern Montana. Helena, Montana: Montana Historical Society Press. ISBN 978-0-9759196-7-5.
- Spence, Clark C. (1975). Territorial Politics and Government in Montana, 1864-89. University of Illinois Press. ISBN 978-0-252-00460-5.
- Spritzer, Donald E. Senator James E. Murray and the Limits of Post-War Liberalism (1985).
- Swibold, Dennis L. Copper chorus: mining, politics, and the Montana press, 1889-1959 (2006)
- Waldron, Ellis L. Montana politics since 1864: an atlas of elections (1958) 428 pages

== Culture ==
- Adams, Ramon F.; Home E. Britzman (1948). Charles M. Russell: The Cowboy Artist - A Biography. Pasadena, California: Trail's End Publishing.
- Egan, Ken. Hope And Dread In Montana Literature (Western Literature Series) (2003)
- Harrison, Brady. All Our Stories Are Here: Critical Perspectives on Montana Literature (2009) excerpt and text search; 12 essays by scholars
- Newby, Rick, and Suzanne Hunger, eds. Writing Montana: literature under the big sky (1996) 27 essays; excerpt and text search
- Patterson, Caroline, ed. Montana Women Writers: A Geography of the Heart (2006)
- WPA. An Ornery Bunch: Tales and Anecdotes Collected by the WPA Montana Writer's Project 1935-1942 ed. by Megan Hiller, Rick Newby, and Elaine Peterson (1999)

== Social history ==
- Carter, Sarah (2009). Montana women homesteaders: a field of one's own. Helena, Montana: Far County Press. ISBN 978-1-56037-500-5.
- Colde, Judith K. "A Wide Field for Usefulness: Women's Civil Status and the Evolution of Women's Suffrage on the Montana Frontier, 1864-1914," American Journal of Legal History, July 1990, Vol. 34 Issue 3, pp 262–294
- Emmons, David M. (1989). The Butte Irish: Class and Ethnicity in an American Mining Town, 1875-1925. Champlain, IL: University of Illinois Press. ISBN 0-252-06155-1.
- Hickcox, David H. "The Impact of the Great Northern Railway on Settlement in Northern Montana, 1880-1920," Railroad History, Summer 1983, Issue 148, pp 58–67
- Melcher, Mary. "'Women's Matters': Birth Control, Prenatal Care, and Childbirth in Rural Montana, 1910-1940," Montana June 1991, Vol. 41 Issue 2, pp 47–56
- Palladino, Lawrence B. (1894). Indian and White in the Northwest; or, A History of Catholicity in Montana. Baltimore, MD: John Murphy & Co.
- Tubbs, Stephenie Ambrose. "Montana Women's Clubs at the Turn of the Century," Montana March 1986, Vol. 36 Issue 1, pp 26–35

== Geology ==
- Alt, David. (1984). Profiles of Montana Geology: A layman's guide to the Treasure State. Butte, Montana: Montana Bureau of Mines and Geology.
- Fritz, William J. (1985). Roadside Geology of the Yellowstone County. Missoula, Montana: Mountain Press. ISBN 0-87842-170-X.

== Bibliographies ==
- Montana As It Is and Was (PDF). Helena, Montana: Montana State Library. 1966.
- Dempsey, Hugh A.; Moir, Lindsey (1989). Bibliography of the Blackfoot: Native American Bibliography Series No. 13. Metuchun, NJ: Scarecrow.
- Johnson, Byran R. (1988). The Blackfeet: An Annotated Bibliography, Garland Reference Library of Social Science, No. 441. New York: Garland.

== Original sources ==
- "Montana Primary Sources From the National Archives Rocky Mountain Region" (PDF). National Archives. Archived from the original (PDF) on 2011-08-13.

== See also ==
- History of Montana
  - Bibliography of Glacier National Park (U.S.)
  - Bibliography of the Lewis and Clark Expedition
  - Bibliography of Yellowstone National Park
  - Bibliography of Wyoming history
- List of bibliographies on American history
