= Montana (journal) =

- Discipline: History
- Language: English
- Edited by: Jeff Bartos

Publication details
- History: 1950–present
- Publisher: Montana Historical Society
- Frequency: Quarterly

Standard abbreviations
- ISO 4: Montana

Indexing
- ISSN: 0026-9891

Links
- Journal homepage

Montana: The Magazine of Western History (formerly The Montana Magazine of History) is a quarterly journal published by the Montana Historical Society.

It publishes articles about the history of Montana as well as the western United States and Canada. The magazine also publishes book and movie reviews. It is heavily illustrated with historic photos, maps, and western American art.

== History ==
=== Inception and creation ===
In 1950, the Montana Historical Society's board of trustees appointed a special committee to create a quarterly journal. The committee included Merrill G. Burlingame, Joseph Kinsey Howard, Anne McDonnell, H. G. Merriam, Albert Partoll, Paul Phillips, Lucinda Scott, and Norman Winestine. The committee agreed that the magazine should reflect the history, culture, and economics of Montana. They named it The Montana Magazine of History. To save on publishing costs, they chose a small format, 6 in × 9 in (150 mm × 230 mm), slightly bigger than Reader's Digest. They set the price of a subscription at three dollars a year.

Albert Partoll volunteered as acting editor for the first issue, which appeared in February 1951. It featured a wood-grain cover and commemorated the white settlers of Montana Territory.

=== Name change ===
In 1951, K. Ross Toole was appointed director of the Montana Historical Society (MHS), and he assumed the position of editor for the magazine. Toole increased the page size and added photographs and illustrations. By 1956, MHS distributed the magazine to more than fifteen thousand readers. With the Spring 1955 issue, Toole changed the name to Montana, The Magazine of Western History, signifying a shift in focus to the entire North American West. Eventually, the comma was dropped from the title.

=== Magazine of Western History ===
At first, most of the members of Montana's editorial board came from within the state. But in the 1970s, editor Vivian Paladin began to invite historians with national reputations to serve on the board. Her efforts positioned the magazine as a scholarly journal. Yet she continued to illustrate articles heavily, and she published readable articles for a popular audience. Montana's reputation as a scholarly journal of western history was cemented in 1984 when the Western History Association chose it as a benefit for their members.

== Editors ==
- Albert Partoll (1951)
- K. Ross Toole (1951–1957)
- Michael Kennedy (1958–1966)
- Vivian Paladin (1966–1978)
- William L. Lang (1978–1989)
- Charles E. Rankin (1989–2001)
- Clark Whitehorn (2001–2006)
- Molly Holz (2006–2018)
- Diana Di Stefano (2018–2024)
- Jeff Bartos (2024–present)

== Awards ==
Articles in Montana have won seven Wrangler Awards, seven Spur Awards, three awards from the Western History Association, and two awards from the Forest History Society. In 2014, the magazine was inducted into the Montana Cowboy Hall of Fame.
