= Merrill G. Burlingame =

American historian (1901–1994)

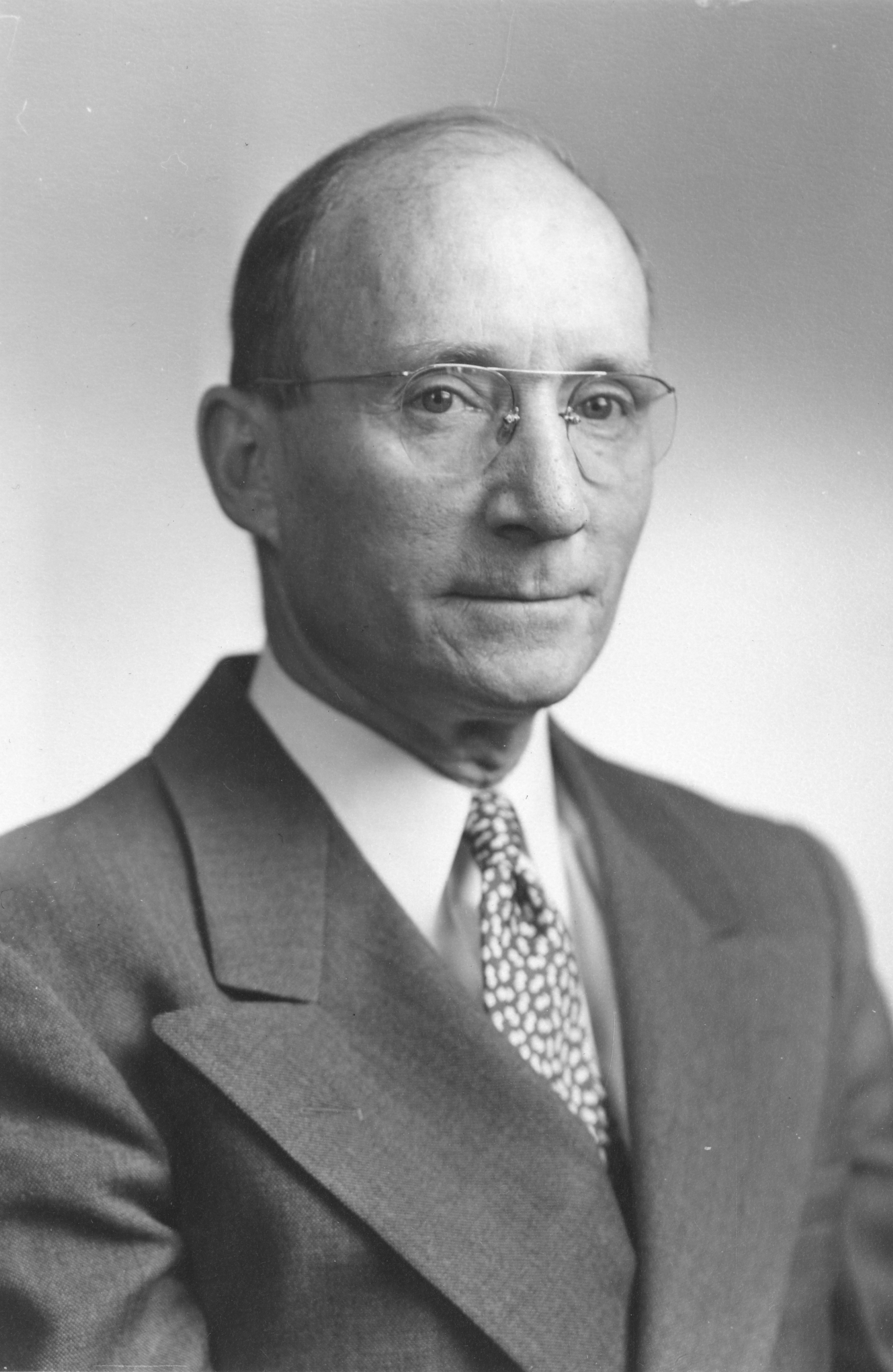
- Born: March 13, 1901; Boone, Iowa
- Died: November 14, 1994 (aged 93); Bozeman, Montana
- Resting place: Sunset Hills Cemetery, Bozeman, Montana; 45°40′31.93″N 111°01′35.38″W
- Education: PhD. University of Iowa
- Occupation: Historian
- Employer: Montana State University
- Title: Professor Emeritus of History
- Spouse: Virginia Struble (1936)
- Children: Ray Burlingame
- Parent(s): Nathan and Teresa Gildea Burlingame

Merrill G. Burlingame (March 13, 1901 – November 14, 1994) was a history professor at Montana State University in Bozeman, Montana who specialized in Montana history and the history of the American West. He was instrumental in the founding of the Museum of the Rockies and driving force behind the resurgence of the Montana Historical Society in the 1960s. In his time, he was known as "Mr. Montana History."

== Early life ==
Merrill Gildea Burlingame was born in Boone, Iowa on March 13, 1901. He was the son of Nathan and Teresa Gildea Burlingame. He attended local schools prior to attending college at the University of Minnesota, the University of Wisconsin, and the University of Iowa where he ultimately received his doctorate in history in 1936. Before joining the faculty of Montana State College in 1929 he taught history at various high schools in Minnesota and Nebraska. He married another historian, Virginia Struble of Davenport, Iowa, in 1936. She was the author of numerous children's short stories and books with environmental and historical themes.

== Montana State University ==
Burlingame joined the faculty of Montana State College (now Montana State University) as a history professor in 1929. In 1935 he was appointed chairman of the history department. He was granted emeritus status in 1969. Burlingame was an active researcher who wrote numerous works on Montana history, among them two books relating to Montana State University's general history. The first, Montana State College 1893 to 1919: a preliminary sketch was published in 1943 in conjunction with the university's 50th anniversary. The second, A History, Montana State University, Bozeman, Montana, was published in 1968 to commemorate the university's 75th anniversary. Burlingame wrote other works relating to the university including The Danforth Chapel and Religious Activities at Montana State University, 1893–1991 (1991) and The Montana Cooperative Extension Service: A history, 1893–1974 (1984).

Burlingame was instrumental in the establishment of the Museum of the Rockies with physician Caroline M. McGill, a Butte, Montana physician, who was a noted collector of Montana antiquities. Burlingame was appointed the first museum director in December 1959. He helped preserve the Montana-related records of the Works Progress Administration Federal Writers' Project. He was a founding member of the Gallatin County Historical Society and Pioneer Museum in 1977, which as of 2014 is located in the building housing the original Gallatin County jail.

== Montana Historical Society ==
Burlingame was closely associated with the Montana Historical Society and considered a founder of Montana: The Magazine of Western History, the society's quarterly journal. He sat on the society's Board of Trustees from 1949 to 1976, serving as president of the board from 1967 to 1969, and on the magazine's editorial board from its inception in 1950 until 1985.

== Legacy ==
The Montana Historical Society annually recognizes the historical research and writings of undergraduate and graduate students in history with its Merrill G. Burlingame and K. Ross Toole award. The Special Collections and Archives of the Montana State University Library are named after Burlingame. His work The Montana Frontier first published in 1942 is considered a seminal work of Montana history.

== Bibliography ==
- "The Buffalo in Trade and Commerce". North Dakota Historical Quarterly. July 1929.
- "The Influence of The Military In The Building Of Montana (Pamphlet)". 29 (2). Seattle, WA: Pacific Northwest Quarterly. 1938: 135–150.
- The Montana Frontier. Helena, Montana: State publishing company. 1942. – Reprinted in 1980
- Burlingame, Merrill G.; Toole, K. Ross (1957). A History of Montana (Three Volumes). New York: Lewis Historical Publishing Company, Inc.
- Hamilton, James McClellan. (1957). Merrill G. Burlingame (ed.). From Wilderness to Statehood: A History of Montana, 1805–1900. Portland, OR: Binfords & Mort.
- Gallatin Century of Progress. Bozeman, Montana: Official Gallatin County Centennial Publication. 1964.
- A History: Montana State University – Bozeman, Montana. Bozeman, Montana: Office of Information, Montana State University. 1968.
- Gallatin County's Heritage: A Report Of Progress 1805–1976. Bozeman, Montana: Gallatin County Bicentennial Publication. 1976.
- John M. Bozeman, Montana trailmaker. Bozeman, Montana: Museum of the Rockies, Montana State University. 1983.
- Burlingame, Merrill G.; Hartling, Harvey C. (1984). Big Sky Disciples, A History of the Christian Church (Disciples of Christ) In Montana. Great Falls, Montana: Christian Church in Montana.
- Burlingame, Merrill G.; Bell, Edward J. Jr. (1984). The Montana Cooperative Extension Service, a history 1893–1974. Bozeman, Montana: Montana State University.
- Callaway, Lew L. Jr. (1997). Burlingame, Merrill G. (ed.). Montana's Righteous Hangmen : The Vigilantes in Action. Norman, OK: University of Oklahoma Press. ISBN 9780806129129.
