= Sarah Berliner Research Fellowship =

Former research grant awarded to female scientists

The Sarah Berliner Research Fellowship for Women was established in 1908 by Emile Berliner in honor of his mother, and first awarded in 1909. The fellowship was award biennially and provided $1200 to support a woman studying physics, chemistry, or biology in either America or Europe. The fellowship was open to women holding the degree of doctor of philosophy or otherwise capable of conducting higher research. The first chair of the awarding committee was Christine Ladd-Franklin, who was also instrumental in the establishment of the fellowship. In 1911, an increase in funding meant that the fellowship could be offered every year.

== Recipients ==
- 1909: Caroline M. McGill, zoology
- 1911–1912: Edna Carter
- 1912: Gertrude Rand, psychology
- 1913: Elizabeth Laird, physics
- 1915: Janet Howell Clark, physiology and biophysics
- 1916?: Ethel Browne Harvey, zoology
- 1916–17: Carlotta Maury, geology (confirmed by a letter to Christine Ladd Franklin from H. Ries, in box 18 of the Ladd-Franklin Archives at Columbia University)
- 1926: Hope Hibbard, biology and zoology
- 1926–27: Helen R. Downes, medicine (confirmed by the minutes of the annual meeting of the Sarah Berliner Research Fellowship Committee, 1926, in box 18 of the Ladd-Franklin Archives at Columbia University)
- 1928: Sally Hughes-Schrader, zoology
- 1934: Emma Margaret Dietz, chemistry
- 1938: Margaret Nast Lewis, physics
- 1939: Olga Hartman, zoology
- 1939: Dorothy Davis Locanthi, astronomer
- [unknown date]: Carol Jane Anger Rieke, astronomy
- [unknown date]: Edna Carter, physics
- [unknown date]: Frances Wick, physics
