= Caroline M. McGill =

American pathologist and doctor (1879–1959)

Caroline McConnell McGill
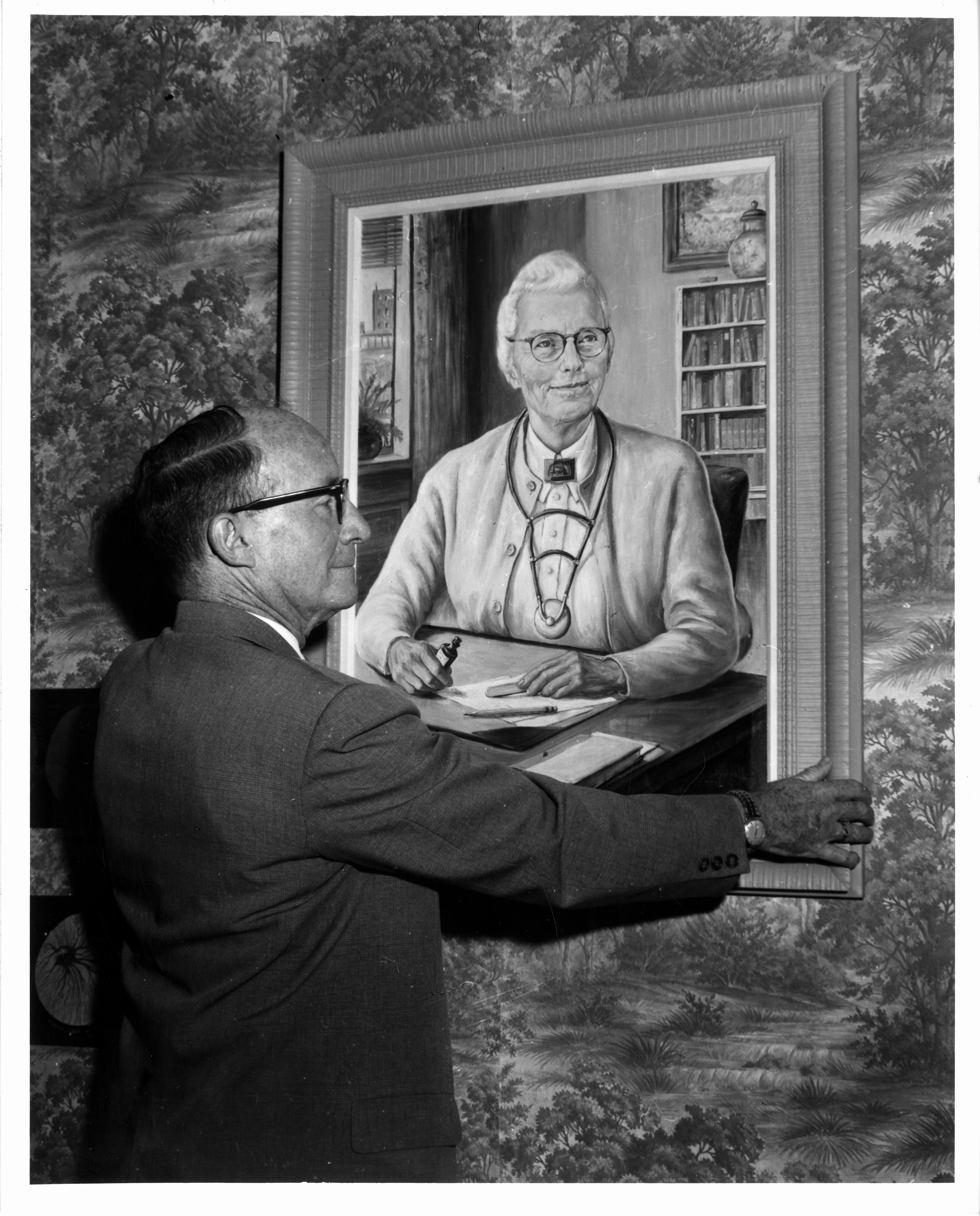
- Burlingame hanging a portrait of McGill
- Born: Caroline McConnell McGill; May 18, 1879; Mansfield, Ohio
- Died: February 4, 1959 (aged 79); 320 Ranch, Gallatin Canyon, Montana
- Other name: Doc McGill
- Citizenship: United States
- Education: Lebanon Normal School, University of Missouri, Johns Hopkins School of Medicine
- Occupation: Doctor of Internal Medicine
- Known for: Founder of the Museum of the Rockies, First Pathologist in Montana, First Female Doctor Butte, Montana

Caroline M. McGill (1879–1959) was an American pathologist and doctor. She was a co-founder of the Museum of the Rockies in Bozeman, Montana, the first pathologist for the state of Montana, and the first successful female doctor in Butte, Montana.

== Early life ==
Caroline M. McGill was born on a farm in Mansfield, Ohio and was one of five children. Her father was a farmer and music teacher and her mother was a midwife. Although later living on a hardscrabble farm on the Missouri Ozarks, McGill's parents were strong supporters of higher education for all their children and McGill received her Teaching Certificate from Lebanon Normal School in 1901. She used this certificate and teaching knowledge to support herself as an instructor at University of Missouri Medical School teaching pathology 1901 through 1909 while working on her Bachelors, Masters and Ph.D. degrees.

=== Awards ===
In 1909, McGill graduated Phi Beta Kappa with a Ph.D. in anatomy and physiology.

In 1909, McGill was honored as the first recipient of the Sarah Berliner Research Fellowship, an endowment that paid for a year of study in Europe, with the opportunity to meet and study with authoritative persons in her field of Zoological science. McGill studied at University of Berlin in Germany, University of Tübingen in Germany, and Naples Zoological Station in Italy.

In 1955, McGill was awarded an honorary doctorate by Montana State College for her "accomplishments in the medical field and in historic and wilderness preservation". The Butte Business and Professional Women’s Club awarded McGill as "Woman of the Year" in 1955.

== Montana ==
While traveling in Europe on the Sarah Berliner Fellowship, she was asked to come to Montana to become a pathologist there; after returning from her studies in Europe, McGill moved to Butte, Montana to become the state's first pathologist (1911–13), working extensively as an advocate for tuberculosis patient and community health initiatives.

McGill's pathology efforts related to Butte miners and the Butte community's ongoing battle with tuberculosis prompted her to work with Montana's anti-tuberculosis organizations; the Montana Tuberculosis Association and an organizer of the Butte Anti-Tuberculosis Society.

McGill was also an outdoor recreationalist. Not only did she treat the miners of Butte, but she also hunted and enjoyed outdoor life with them. In her diary, she wrote, "never was any older woman more differently or more kindly treated...the relaxation of this outdoor life made it possible for me to carry on my heavy practice in Butte".

== Later years ==
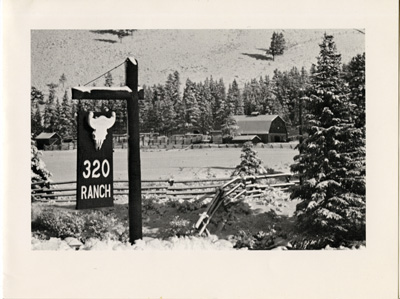
320 Ranch (Caroline M. McGill Digital Collection)

After retiring from her medical practice in 1956, she started working with Merrill G. Burlingame in 1957, donating to the people of Montana the gift of her large collection of artifacts, collectible antiques, her personal and professional papers, and her time to catalog all the materials; the two became co-founders of the Museum of the Rockies.

== Publications ==
- The Effect of Low Temperatures on Hydra. McGill, Caroline. Biological Bulletin, ISSN 0006-3185, 01/1908, Volume 14, Issue 2, pp. 78–88
- The structure of smooth muscle in the resting and in the contracted condition. McGill, Caroline. American Journal of Anatomy, ISSN 0002-9106, 1909, Volume 9, Issue 1, pp. 493–562
- The early histogenesis of striated muscle in the esophagus of the pig and the dogfish. McGill, Caroline. The Anatomical Record, ISSN 0003-276X, 01/1910, Volume 4, Issue 1, pp. 23–47
- The effect of contraction on the volume of the smooth muscle nucleus. McGill, Caroline. The Anatomical Record, ISSN 0003-276X, 12/1909, Volume 3, Issue 12, pp. 633–635
- The chromosomes of anasa tristis and anax junius. Lefevre, George and McGill, Caroline. American Journal of Anatomy, ISSN 0002-9106, 02/1908, Volume 7, Issue 4, pp. 469–487
- Blood Urea Determinations in 211 Cases. Schwartz, Harold and McGill, Caroline. Archives of Internal Medicine, ISSN 1538-3679, 01/1916, Volume XVII, Issue 1, p. 42
- Abstracts. Corson, Eugene R; McGill, Caroline; Kirk, Edwin G; Coghill, G. E; Pohlman, A. G; Retzer, Robert. The Anatomical Record, ISSN 0003-276X, 07/1908, Volume 2, Issue 4, pp. 143–156
