= Sally Hughes-Schrader =

American zoologist

Sally Peris Hughes-Schrader (1895–1984) was a professor of zoology at Duke University, 1962–1966.

Sally P. Hughes was born in Hubbard, Oregon. Hughes was accepted at Columbia University where she majored in protozoology and obtained her M.A. in 1922, completing her Ph.D. at Columbia in 1924. She taught at Bryn Mawr College and later at Columbia University. She was Professor of Zoology and the head of the Biology Department at Barnard College. Hughes performed the first complete dissection of the cranial nerves of the dogfish and made studies of hapoidy, parthenogenesis, hermaphroditism, and the life cycle of insects.

She came to Woods Hole in the summer of 1918 as a student from Grinnell College and was enrolled in the embryology course at the Marine Biological Laboratory. In 1922, she was listed as an instructor at Bryn Mawr and was a student in the MBL's protozoology course. In 1925, she returned to the MBL as an Independent Investigator in Zoology and continued in this capacity for several years. She later became a Life Member of the MBL Corporation. In 1928–1929, she was awarded the Sarah Berliner Research Fellowship from the American Association of University Women.

In 1920, she married the cytologist and geneticist Franz Schrader. She was elected a Fellow of the American Academy of Arts and Sciences in 1963.
