= Ethel Browne Harvey =

American embryologist

Ethel (Nicholson) Browne Harvey (December 14, 1885 in Baltimore, Maryland – September 2, 1965 in Falmouth, Massachusetts) was an American embryologist, known for her critical findings about cell division, using the embryology of sea urchins, and for early work studying embryonic cell cleavage.

== Biography and education ==
Ethel Nicholson Browne was born December 14, 1885, in Baltimore, Maryland, to Bennett Barnard Browne and Jennifer Nicholson Browne. She was one of five children; three of her siblings became doctors, including two of her sisters (Jennie Nicholson Browne and Mary Nicholson Browne), and one of her brothers became a metallurgist.

Browne's parents sent their three daughters to the Bryn Mawr School, which was the first solely preparatory girls' school in the United States. Browne graduated there in 1902, and then attended Goucher College (then known as the Woman's College of Baltimore). After graduating with her B.A. in 1906, she then studied zoology at Columbia University, earning an MA in 1907 and a Ph.D. in 1913 under Thomas Hunt Morgan and Edmund Beecher Wilson.

In 1915, she married fellow scientist, E. Newton Harvey, a physiologist known for work on bioluminescence. Browne, adopting her husband's surname, had two children with him; Edmund Newton Harvey, Jr. (born 1916, later a chemist) and Richard Bennet Harvey (born 1922, later a physician). Although working only part-time for the next several years, she nevertheless continued her work, making numerous important contributions.

Ethel Browne Harvey died of peritonitis from appendicitis in 1965.

== Career and research ==
At Columbia she worked with Thomas Hunt Morgan and Edmund Beecher Wilson. Her doctoral thesis in 1913 was on the male germ cells of genus Notonecta, an aquatic insect, leading her to further work focusing on cellular mechanisms in inheritance and development. She was supported during this time by several fellowships aimed at assisting women in science, including a Sarah Berliner Research Fellowship from the Society for the Promotion of University Education for Women.

During her graduate studies at Columbia, Browne "demonstrated that transplanting the hypostome from one hydra into another hydra would induce a secondary axis in the host hydra." This work, done in 1909, preceded experiments in 1924 by Hans Spemann and Hilde Mangold, that are credited with discovering the "organizer" — this work was the basis of a Nobel Prize given to Spemann. Howard M. Lenhoff has argued that Ethel Browne should have shared in Spemann's Nobel Prize, because she did the experiment first; she understood its significance; and she had, in fact, sent her paper to Spemann, who had underlined the portion of the paper that discussed the significance of her work.

In the 1930s, she demonstrated a method of parthenogenetic cleavage, inducing unfertilized sea urchin eggs to cleave and ultimately to hatch. Browne used centrifugal force to remove the nuclei of these eggs. This work received popular attention as "creation of life without parents". Browne's experiments were especially noteworthy in that she demonstrated that chromosomes were not necessary to create life. Her experiments showed that cytoplasm was capable of developing life without the need for the nucleus. She termed this method of creating life as "parthenogenic merogony" in which "a portion of the egg without the nucleus is fertilized". In 1950, Ethel Browne Harvey was elected to be the second woman on the Marine Biological Laboratory board of trustees.

Browne worked for many years at the Marine Biological Laboratory at Woods Hole, Massachusetts. She taught at a variety of institutions, including the Bennett School for Girls in Millbrook, New York, the Dana Hall School in Wellesley, Massachusetts; Washington Square College at NYU. She conducted scientific research in a variety of positions including Princeton University and Cornell Medical College. She was associated with the American Women's Table in Naples, an organization established by Ida Henrietta Hyde and other women scientists.

== Bibliography ==
- Selected significant publications
  - The American Arbacia and Other Sea Urchins (1956)
  - "A Study of the Male Germ Cells in Notonecta", Journal of Experimental Zoology, Jan. 1913
  - "A Review of the Chromosome Numbers in the Metazoa", Journal of Morphology, Dec. 1916 and June 1920
  - "Parthenogenetic Merogony or Cleavage Without Nuclei in Arbacia puntulata ", Biological Bulletin, Aug. 1936
  - "Fertilization", Encyclopædia Britannica, 1946 and 1961.
- Many publications in The Biological Bulletin from 1919 to 1962

== Awards ==
- 1956 - Honorary D.Sc. from Goucher College
- Fellow, American Association for the Advancement of Science
- Fellow, L'Institut International d'Embryologie in Utrecht
- Fellow, New York Academy of Sciences
- Elected as trustee of the Marine Biological Laboratory in Woods Hole.

== Further reading and research ==
- Donna J. Haraway, "Ethel Browne Harvey", in Barbara Sicherman and Carol Hurd Green, editors, Notable American Women: The Modern Period: A Biographical Dictionary. Volume 4 (Harvard University Press, 1980)
- Obituary, The New York Times, Sept. 3, 1965.
