= Hope Hibbard =

American zoologist

- Born: December 18, 1893; Altoona, Pennsylvania
- Died: May 12, 1988 (aged 94)
- Education: University of Missouri, bachelor's (1916), master's (1918); Bryn Mawr College, doctorate (1921); University of Paris, doctorate
- Occupations: Biologist, cytologist, zoologist, and professor of zoology
- Employer: Oberlin College

Hope Hibbard (December 18, 1893- May 12, 1988) was an American biologist, cytologist, zoologist, and professor of zoology. Born in Altoona, Pennsylvania, she conducted research in the fields of histology and marine biology, utilizing organisms such as silkworms, limpets, earthworms, and frogs. Hibbard dedicated most of her life to education as a professor at multiple institutions, including Bryn Mawr College, Elmira College, and Oberlin College. She received accolades for her research and academic merits, such as the Sarah Berliner Research Fellowship and the Adelia A. Field Johnston Professor of Zoology. Hibbard is not only remembered for her intellectual endeavors, but for her support of women in the scientific sphere and her involvement in associations that forwarded female roles in science and research, such as the American Association of University Women (AAUW).

== Early life and education ==
Hibbard was born to parents Mary (né Scofield) Hibbard and Herbert Wade Hibbard in 1893. Her father worked as a mechanical engineering professor.

Hibbard entered college at the University of Missouri, where she completed her undergraduate degree in zoology in 1916. She subsequently earned her master's degree, also in zoology, from the University of Missouri in 1918. From there, she elected to complete her Ph. D in zoology at Bryn Mawr College while additionally serving as a demonstrator for Bryn Mawr's biology department until 1921. The doctoral research conducted for her Ph.D. in zoology focused on the fertilization of sea urchin eggs.

After completing her graduate studies, Hibbard began her occupational journey as a professor at Elmira College. She first served as an associate professor, remaining at Elmira for four years. In the year 1926, Hibbard was honored with the Sarah Berliner Fellowship, a one-year educational opportunity provided by the AAUW which allowed her to study and work as a laboratory preparateur at the University of Paris. During that time, Hibbard's laboratory position centered on comparative anatomy techniques, which allowed her to conduct research of her own. After her fellowship ended, Hibbard was able to extend her European education for one more year with the support of the International Education Board. Her two years of education and research concerning the oogenesis of frog eggs earned a doctorate of science from the Sorbonne.

== Academia ==
Upon her return to the United States in 1928, Hibbard accepted the position of assistant professor in the zoology department at Oberlin College in Ohio. She devoted the next 34 years of her life at the college, occupying several different positions and titles. For 33 of her 34 years at Oberlin, she was the only female faculty member of the zoology department. Hibbard was promoted to an associate professor after serving just three years at Oberlin, and in an additional three years, she rose to the rank of full professor. This series of advancements in her professorship was almost unheard of for women during Hibbard's time; the standard progression of women professors was a drawn-out process, and female professors were commonly made to either wait for an interval of time determined by international guidelines before rising in rank or remain at their current rank. Her steady elevation in the zoology department was therefore unorthodox in her day and age.

Hibbard's research conducted while at Oberlin concentrated on a variety of fields, including cytology, histology, and marine biology. Her histological studies pinpointed research concerning organs and tissues of several marine invertebrates, including limpets, earthworms, silkworms, and squid. Her cytological research was conducted on the Golgi apparatus. She additionally worked as a trustee at the Woods Holes Marine Biological Laboratory in Massachusetts during her professorship at Oberlin.

in 1952, Hibbard received the title of Adelia A. Field Johnston Professor of Zoology, an esteemed promotion in her department. Two years later, after 24 years of teaching at Oberlin College, Hibbard began her four-year term as department chair.

== Advocacy for women in science ==
Hibbard is viewed as a crusader for women in the scientific sphere. She held strong opinions about the untapped abilities of women due to both perpetuated stereotypes initialized by men and additional self-deprecating tendencies, and she utilized her membership in several academic assemblies to express her viewpoints. Hibbard served as an avid member of the AAUW and the American Association for the Advancement of Science, among others, and wrote several discourses in which she urged women to integrate marriage and professional endeavors within science rather than abandoning one from the other.

Examples of Hibbard's papers include "Vocations for Women and How College Can Prepare Them" (1935), "The Life of Oberlin Women Today" (1937), and "Women in Research." In these multiple dialogues, Hibbard communicated her desire for women to overcome social boundaries concerning their position in science. She worked to encourage women to forge their paths independent of discouraging social views and to mold their own journey as both intellectuals and spouses, as opposed to exclusively one of the two.

Hibbard additionally spearheaded the Oberlin chapter of League of Women Voters while a professor at the institution.

== Death and legacy ==
Hibbard died at the age of 94 in 1988, one year after becoming an honorary life member of the AAUW. Oberlin College honored her memory by establishing the Hope Hibbard Memorial Award shortly following her death.
