= Edna Carter =

American physicist

- Born: Edna Carter; 28 January 1872; High Cliff, Wisconsin, US
- Died: 14 May 1963 (aged 91)
- Education: Vassar College, University of Würzburg
- Known for: Contributions to X-ray research
- Awards: Sarah Berliner Research Fellowship
- Scientific career
- Fields: Physics
- Institutions: Vassar College, University of Chicago, Albertus Magnus College, California Institute of Technology
- Thesis: (1906)

Edna Carter (January 28, 1872 - May 14, 1963) was an American physicist born in High Cliff, Wisconsin. Carter graduated from Vassar College in Poughkeepsie, New York, in 1894. Carter was known for her contributions to X-ray research. Carter's work on the properties of X-rays laid the foundations for Max von Laue's discovery of the wave-like properties of X-rays, for which he won the Nobel Prize in 1914.

== Early life ==
Edna Carter was born January 29, 1872, in High Cliff, Wisconsin. Her parents both came from New Hampshire, and she was raised as the youngest of her eight other siblings. She grew up in a small town surrounded by Lake Winnebago and the countryside.

== College ==
Edna Carter studied at Vassar College as a student from 1890 to 1894. Carter originally favored biology, due to the inspiration of her biology teacher Marcella O’Grady. she was taught physics by Dr. Cooley, who she indicated as the inspiration for her to begin a career in physics.

== Early career ==
Carter's first role after college was as substitute headmistress of a local high school. Carter said about this time, “There I taught a great variety of subjects and sometimes burned the midnight oil literally in a lamp which smoked badly if I forgot to adjust it. My most vivid remembrance of that year concerns an argument with a minister. His sermon in ‘Education Week’, was a shock to all my ideas about science imbibed from Professor O'Grady's teaching, so I wrote an article for the local paper. This drew a bitter personal attack and bad consequences ultimately for my antagonist. Fortunately for me, Dr. Cooley at this point asked me to return to Vassar as an assistant in physics.”

In 1896, Carter joined Vassar College as a Physics assistant. After two years there, she continued her career at The University of Chicago, studying alongside Albert A. Michelson and Nobel Prize-winner Robert Andrews Millikan, two renowned American physicists.

In 1899, for around five years, Carter went back to Oshkosh, Wisconsin, to teach in high school. She became the assistant principal.

She then went to Würzburg, Germany, in 1904, accompanying Marcella Boveri and Theodor Boveri, a German biologist, to study for her Ph.D. in Physics. She received her PhD in 1906.

== Later career ==
Carter returned to Vassar College in 1906 for the rest of her career, first becoming an assistant in physics to Dr. Cooley. She most usually found herself being the only woman in the places she studied.

In only the second semester of teaching as a Physics professor at Vassar College in the school year of 1911–1912, she was awarded the Sarah Berliner Research Fellowship. Carter continued her work in the physics department under Professor J. J. Thomson at the University of Cambridge, as well as in Professor Wilhelm Wien's laboratory of Würzburg, Germany. Between the years of 1919 to 1939, Carter served as chairman of the Vassar College Physics Department. In 1941, she organized the Physics Department at Albertus Magnus College and was a professor there for two years. During 1943 and 1944, she was involved in defense work for the Federal government of the United States at the California Institute of Technology.

== Retirement ==
Carter officially retired at the age of 73 after her work on rockets used in war at the California Institute of Technology. She died at the age of 91 in 1963.
