= Janet Howell Clark =

American physiologist and biophysicist

- Born: January 1, 1889; Baltimore, Maryland, United States
- Died: February 12, 1969 (aged 80); Baltimore, Maryland, United States
- Education: Bryn Mawr College; Johns Hopkins University
- Known for: Dean of the Women’s College at the University of Rochester; Physiological effects of radiation
- Spouse: Admont Halsey Clark (1917 - 1918, his death)
- Children: 1
- Scientific career
- Fields: Physiology; Biophysics
- Workplaces: Bryn Mawr College; Johns Hopkins University; University of Rochester
- Thesis: The Fundamental Law of the Grating (1913)
- Doctoral advisors: Joseph Sweetman Ames; J. A. Anderson

Janet Howell Clark (January 1, 1889 – February 12, 1969) was an American physiologist and biophysicist.

== Early life and education ==
Clark was born Janet Tucker Howell on January 1, 1889, in Baltimore, Maryland, the eldest of three children and the daughter of Anne Janet Tucker and William Henry Howell. Her father was a professor of physiology at Johns Hopkins University and director of Johns Hopkins School of Hygiene and Public Health. She attended Bryn Mawr School, a Quaker school in Pennsylvania, graduating top of her class in 1906 and winning a scholarship to attend Bryn Mawr College where she majored in physics. She graduated from Bryn Mawr College in 1910, and in 1913 she received her PhD in physics from Johns Hopkins University. Her dissertation, done under Joseph Sweetman Ames and J. A. Anderson, was the statement of the fundamental law of the diffraction grating.

== Academic career ==
After earning her PhD, she worked as a lecturer in physics for two years at Bryn Mawr College, beginning in 1914. In 1915 she won the Sarah Berliner Research Fellowship from the American Association of University Women for study at the Mt. Wilson Observatory.

Following her husband's death in 1918, she returned to live with her parents in Baltimore and accepting a position in the Department of Physiology at Johns Hopkins School of Hygiene and Public Health, as an instructor in physiological hygiene. She was promoted to assistant professor in 1920 and associate professor in 1923. She focused on the effects of radiation on human eyesight including occupational diseases related to illumination, and had a particular interest in the physiological effects of visible and ultraviolet light, infrared light, and X-ray radiation in a variety of organisms and tissue types. Other research interests included the production of cataracts and the use of radiation to kill pathogens. In 1924 she published her lectures as a textbook, Lighting in Relation to Public Health.

In 1935 Clark became the headmistress of the Bryn Mawr School after the Department of Physiological Hygiene and the Department of Chemical Hygiene at Johns Hopkins University were combined under the leadership of Elmer McCollum. While she was headmistress, the Bryn Mawr School moved from the center of Baltimore to the countryside then just outside the city.

In 1938, she became dean of the Women's College and professor of biological sciences at the University of Rochester. While at the University of Rochester, Clark established a separate faculty for the university's Women's College. She also continued her research in biophysics, studying the effect of radiation on breast tumors in mice under a grant from the Jane Coffin Childs Memorial Fund. Clark retired from the University of Rochester in 1952 after university president Cornelis de Kiewiet merged the men's and women's colleges into one and downgraded Clark's position to being lower than that of the Dean of Men's. The university created the Janet Howell Clark Prize Scholarship in her honor in 1966. The prize is awarded annually to a senior woman "who has shown the greatest promise in creative work in either astronomy, biology, chemistry, or physics, and who has shown outstanding versatility in the mastery of allied fields."

After her retirement from the University of Rochester, Clark moved back to Baltimore and lectured on environmental medicine and continued her research. She worked as a member of the Photobiology Committee of the Division of Biology and Agriculture of the National Research Council. She was also active in the American Association of University Women, the American Physiological Society, the Optical Society of America, and the American Association for the Advancement of Science.

== Personal life ==
In 1917, Janet Howell married Dr. Admont Halsey Clark, a professor in Pathology at Johns Hopkins University Medical School, who died in October 1918 at age 30 due to the Spanish influenza epidemic. The couple had one daughter.

== Publications ==
- Clark, J. H. Lighting in Relation to Public Health. Baltimore, MD: Williams & Wilkins, 1924.
- Clark, J. H. "Studies on radiated proteins. 1. Coagulation of egg albumen by ultraviolet light and heat." American Journal of Physiology 73: 649-660, 1925.
- Clark, J. H. "Ultraviolet radiation in relation to health." Nutr. Abstr. Rev. 3: 3-21, 1933.
- Clark, J. H. "Studies on radiated proteins. 2. The effect of ultraviolet light on lens proteins." American Journal of Physiology 113: 538-547, 1935.
