= Great Falls Leader =

The Great Falls Leader was a daily evening newspaper published in Great Falls, Montana. Established on June 16, 1888, the Leader was one of two daily newspapers in the city for much of its history, competing with the morning Great Falls Tribune. Publication of the Leader ended in 1969.

It was established by Herbert and Martha Rolfe to counter the influence of Great Falls founder Paris Gibson’s Democratic Tribune. After Herbert died in 1895, Martha became the sole editor of The Leader herself, thereby becoming the first woman to edit a daily newspaper in the state. Today, the Leader is perhaps best remembered as the long-time employer of Joseph Kinsey Howard, one of Montana's most noted authors and journalists. Howard was hired by the Leader as a reporter in 1923. when he was a seventeen-year-old high school graduate. He became the paper's news editor three years later, and held that position until 1944.
