= Montana Historical Society =

Historical society and state agency in Montana, United States

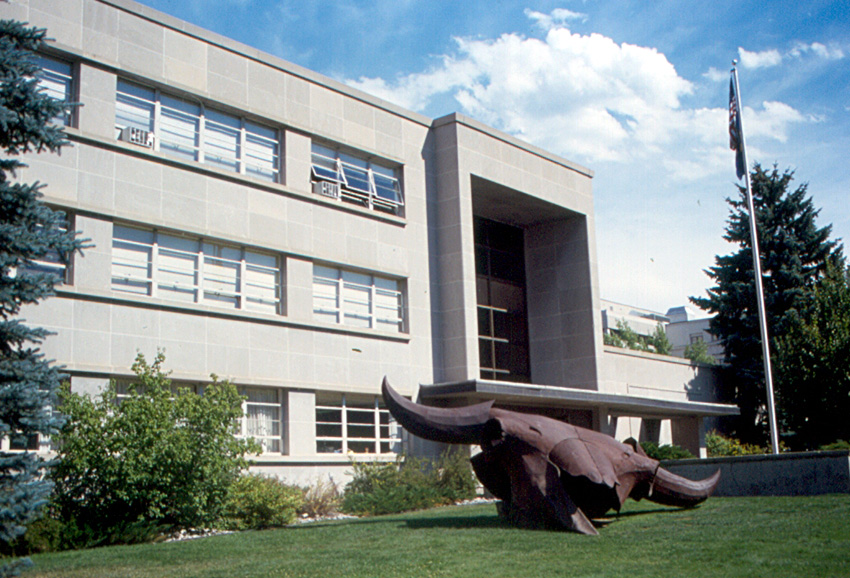
- The Veterans and Pioneers Memorial Building, home of the Montana Historical Society since 1953, as it appeared in 1999

Agency overview
- Formed: February 2, 1865; 161 years ago
- Jurisdiction: Montana State Government
- Headquarters: Helena, Montana
- Motto: Big Sky, Big Land, Big History
- Agency executive: Molly Kruckenberg, Director
- Website: mhs.mt.gov

The Montana Historical Society (MHS) is a historical society located in the U.S. state of Montana that acts to preserve historical resources important to the understanding of Montana history. The society provides services through six operational programs: Administration, Research Center, Museum, Publications, Historic Preservation, and Education. It is governed by a 15-member Board of Trustees, appointed by the governor, which hires the director of the society and sets policy for the agency. Founded in 1865, it is one of the oldest such institutions in the Western United States.

== History and organization ==
On December 21, 1864, seven months after the creation of the Montana Territory, Council Bill 15 was introduced into the Territorial legislature by Francis M. Thompson, a representative from Beaverhead County who would only live in Montana two and a half years, to create the Historical Society of Montana. The bill, "An Act to Incorporate the Historical Society of Montana", was signed into law February 2, 1865 "in order to collect and arrange facts in regard to the early history of this Territory, the discovery of its mines, incidents of the fur trade, etc." and was incorporated by Hezekiah L. Hosmer, Christopher P. Higgins, John Owens, James Stuart, Wilbur F. Sanders, Malcolm Clark, Francis M. Thompson, William Graham, Granville Stuart, Walter W. deLacy, C.E. Irvine, and Charles S. Bagg. The society is the second oldest state historical society west of the Mississippi River. On March 25, 1865, members of the society elected Wilbur Sanders President, Granville Stuart Secretary-Treasurer, and the Honorable Hezekiah L. Hosmer Historian. At the time of its founding, Granville Stuart was a merchant, Walter deLacy was the Territorial Surveyor, Hezekiah Hosmer was the Chief Justice of the Territorial Court and Wilbur Sanders was prominent in the Virginia City vigilante movement.

The Society was reorganized as a state agency March 4, 1891 and by "An Act to Perpetuate the Historical Society of the State of Montana" March 1, 1949.

Originally located in Virginia City, it was moved to Helena in 1874 after a disputed election approved Helena as the territory's new capital. In 1902, it was located in the basement of the new Montana State Capitol building.

== Collections ==
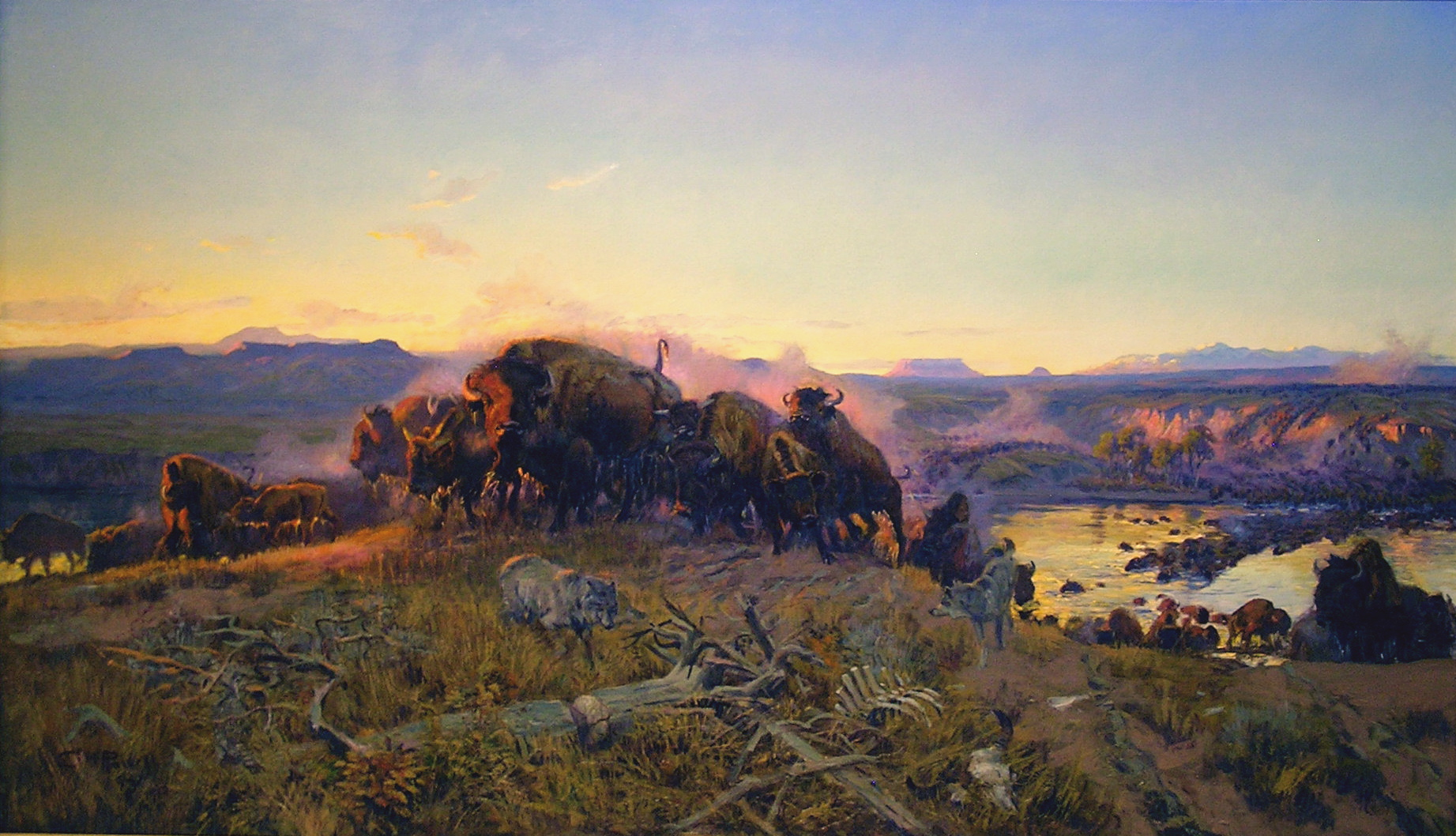
When the Land Belonged to God by C.M. Russell is one of the highlights of the society's collections

The archives collections include manuscripts from the early 1860s to the present, in addition to a large number of oral histories, mostly from the 20th and 21st centuries. The archives has served as the legal repository, or state archives, for Montana state and local government since 1969, and therefore includes a great number of government records. The photograph archives are extensive, housing over half-a-million images from the 19th and 20th centuries. The library collection comprises books and pamphlets, newspapers and periodicals, maps, federal and state publications, posters and musical scores, as well as the state's largest collection of newspaper clippings and magazine articles. The museum program has a substantial collection of art and artifacts documenting all of Montana history, including a large and representative group of materials documenting Montana Native American culture.

== Publications ==
The first significant publications of the society were the Contributions to the Historical Society of Montana published in ten volumes between 1876 and 1941. Under the leadership of Society director K. Ross Toole, in 1951, the society began publication of the quarterly journal The Montana Magazine of History. In 1953, under the masthead "To Preserve, To Publish, and To Promote interest in, The History of Montana", the journal was renamed: Montana, The Magazine of Western History. The Society operates the Montana Historical Society Press to publish books for students and adults on subjects related to the people, places and events in Montana history.

== Montana Historical Society Museum ==
The Montana Heritage Center, newly redesigned and completed in 2025, is located in Helena, Montana. Open year-round, the museum's displays include the state's fine art, history, archaeological and ethnological artifacts.

== Archive theft ==
In November 2023, Brian D'Ambrosio was indicted on 10 counts related to theft of objects of cultural heritage from the Montana Historical Society which he offered for sale on eBay or to private collectors. The thefts occurred between April 2022 to September 2023. He was caught when attempting to sell items to an undercover FBI agent; the original indictment contained a list of eight items. The prosecution argued that the items D’Ambrosio stole would bring him significant profit, such letters from Nancy Russell, wife of artist C.M. Russell. He pled guilty to theft of major artwork in July 2024, and the remaining nine counts were dropped as part of the plea agreement. In December federal judge Brian Morris sentenced him to six months in federal prison, imposed a $4000 fine and ordered $22,508 in restitution. Upon release from incarceration, D’Ambrosio faces an additional year of supervised release. In addition to the 91 items D'Ambrosio tried to sell on eBay—at least 85 of which are believed to belong to the Montana Historical Society—the FBI also found 21 more historical items at D’Ambrosio’s residence, and four more were returned from a local business. Though 11 of the eBay items were recovered, As of January 2025 the other 80—at least 74 thought to belong to the Society—have yet to be found.

U.S. Attorney Jesse Laslovich stated at sentencing, “D’Ambrosio’s actions were intentional and calculated—designed to steal Montana’s cultural treasures so he could profit. The Montana Historical Society, and all Montanans, were victims of D’Ambrosio’s greed because these documents were deeply rooted in Montana history." The Montana Historical Society staff provided an additional statement for the record, “The items stolen by you (D’Ambrosio) from the collections belong to the people of Montana, not to you for your selfish, greedy purposes. Your actions forced us to implement stricter rules regarding access and use of historical documents, which impacts all future researchers…. The emotional and financial impacts will be felt for generations.”

== Notable people ==
- Laura E. Howey (1851-1911), Secretary and Librarian of the Montana State Historical and Miscellaneous Library (1898-1907)
- K. Ross Toole. Historian and Director of the Montana Historical Society
