= Bibliography of Glacier National Park =

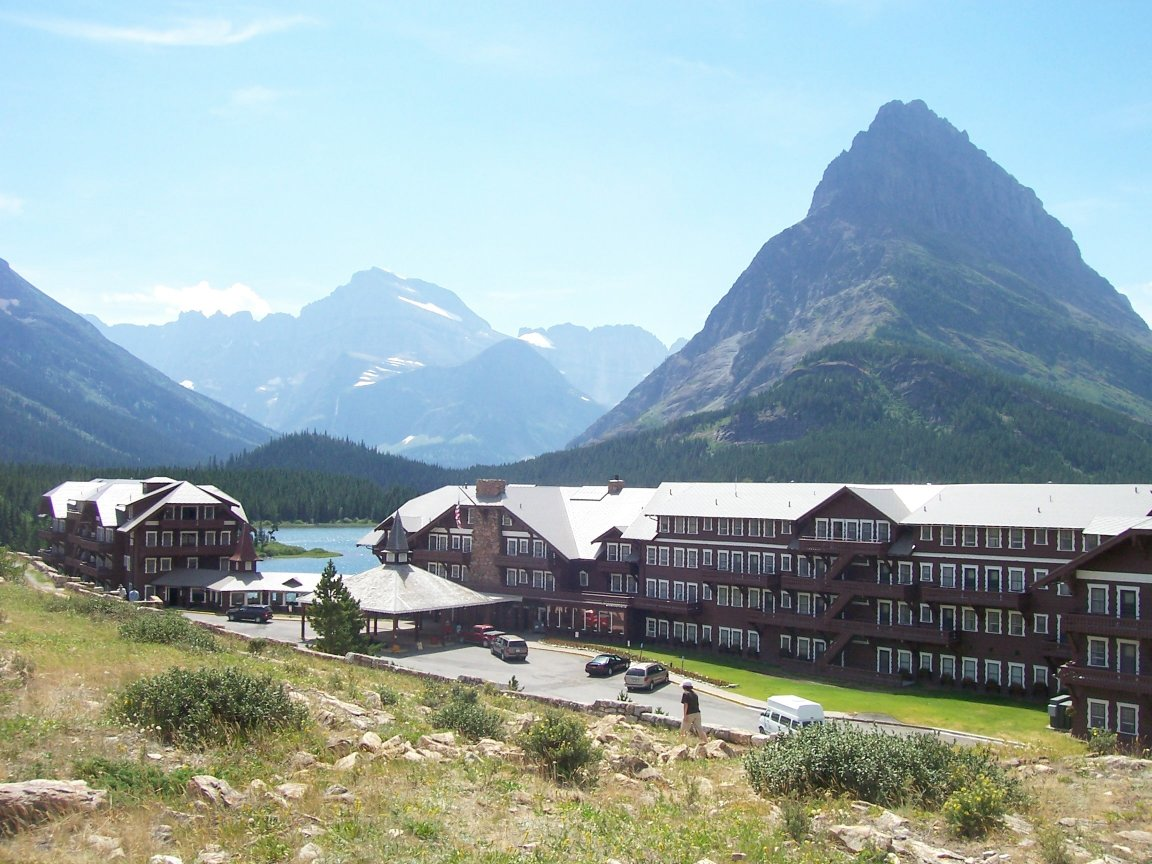
Many Glacier Hotel

The List of Glacier National Park (U.S.) references identifies English language historic, scientific, ecological, cultural, tourism, social, and advocacy books, journals and studies on the subject of Glacier National Park (U.S.) topics published since 1870 and documented in Glacier related bibliographies and other related references.

== Glacier National Park history ==
The following references are primarily focused on the exploration, creation and history of the park.

- Hileman, Tomar Jacob (1915). Glacier National Park: Switzerland of America. Brooklyn, N.Y: The Albertype Co.
- Hileman, Tomar Jacob (1920). Glacier National Park. Scenic Marvel of America. Brooklyn, N.Y: The Albertype Co.
- Grant, Madison (1925). "The Beginnings of Glacier National Park". Hunting and Conservation. The Book of the Boone and Crockett Club. New Haven, CT: Yale University Press.
- Ralph L. Beals (1935). History of Glacier National Park with Particular Emphasis on the Northern Developments. National Park Service. Archived from the original on July 2, 2007.
- Robinson, Donald H. (1960). Through the Years in Glacier National Park-An Administrative History. West Glacier, MT: Glacier Natural History Association. Archived from the original on March 1, 2010.
- Ober, Michael J. (1973). Enmity and Alliance: Park Service-Concessioner Relations in Glacier National Park, 1892-1961. MA Thesis - University of Montana.
- Buchholtz, C. W. (1976). Man In Glacier. West Glacier, MT: Glacier Natural History Association. ISBN 0-916792-01-3.
- Hanna, Warren L. (1986). The Life and Times of James Willard Schultz (Apikuni). Norman, Oklahoma: University of Oklahoma Press. ISBN 0-8061-1985-3.
- Hanna, Warren L. (1988). Stars over Montana-Men Who Made Glacier National Park History. West Glacier, MT: Glacier Natural History Association. ISBN 978-0-09-167906-4.
- Mark David Spence: Crown of the Continent, Backbone of the World – The American Wilderness Ideal and Blackfeet Exclusion from Glacier National Park. In: Environmental History, Vol. 1, No. 3 (July 1996), p. 29-49
- Djuff, Ray; Morrison, Chris (2001). View with a Room: Glacier's Historic Hotels and Chalets. Helena, MT: Farcountry Press. ISBN 1-56037-170-6.
- Peterson, Larry Len (2002). The Call of the Mountains-The Artists of Glacier National Park. Settlers West Galleries.

== Glacier National Park management ==
The following references are primarily focused on issues of park management by the National Park Service.

- Harrison, Laura Soullière (1986). "Great Northern Railway Buildings". National Park Service: Architecture in the Parks. National Park Service. Archived from the original on 17 April 2006.
- Neal Christensen, Norma Nickerson: Three Communities Explore Tourism. University of Montana, Institute for Tourism & Recreation Research, September 1996
- Norma Nickerson: What the People think - Glacier National Park and Vicinity. University of Montana, Institute for Tourism & Recreation Research, May 2003

== Glacier National Park fisheries ==
The following references are primarily focused on the history, taxonomy and management of, and angling in the park's fisheries:

- Kinnie, Ernest J. (1960). Fishing Guide to Glacier National Park. Berkeley, CA: Gazette Press.
- Schneider, Russ (2002). Fishing Glacier National Park. Guildford, CT: Falcon Press. ISBN 0-7627-1099-3.

== Glacier National Park wildlife ==
The following references are primarily focused on the history, taxonomy and management of the park's wildlife.

- Wild Animals of Glacier National Park-The Mammals (PDF). 1918.
- Leonard P. Schultz (1941). Fishes of Glacier National Park. U.S. National Museum. Archived from the original on March 3, 2008.
- Hoffman, R.S.; Pattie, D.L. (1968). A Guide to Montana Mammals. University of Montana Press.
- Olsen, Jack (1969). Night of the Grizzlies. Homestead Publishing. ISBN 0-943972-48-5.
- Parrat, Lloyd P. (1973). Birds of Glacier National Park. West Glacier, Montana: Glacier Natural History Association, Inc.
- Bailey, Vernon; Bailey, Florence Merriam (2007). Wild Animals of Glacier National Park: The Mammals and the Birds. Whitefish, MT: Kessinger Publishers. ISBN 978-0-548-13995-0.
- Shea, David S. Mammals of Glacier National Park Field Checklist (Report). Glacier National Park, National Park Service. Archived from the original on 28 February 2010.
- Shea, David S. (March 2004). Birds of Glacier National Park-Field Checklist (PDF) (Report). National Park Service. Archived from the original (PDF) on 2006-12-29.

== Glacier National Park flora ==
The following references are primarily focused on the history, taxonomy and management of the park's flora.

- Standley, Paul C. (1921). "Flora of Glacier National Park Montana" (PDF). Contributions from the United States National Herbarium. 22 (5). Smithsonian Institution.
- Sharpe, Grant (1954). 101 Wildflowers of Glacier National Park. West Glacier, MT: The Glacier Natural History Association.
- Kimball, Shannon F.; Lesica, Peter (2005). Wildflowers of Glacier National Park: And Surrounding Areas. WV: Trillium Press. ISBN 1-931832-54-4.

== Glacier National Park ecology ==
The following references are primarily focused on the ecology of the park.

- Prato, Tony (2007). Fagre, Dan (ed.). Sustaining Rocky Mountain Landscapes – Science, Policy, and Management for the Crown of the Continent Ecosystem. Washington D.C.: Resources for the Future. ISBN 978-1-933115-45-0.
- Butler, David; Malanson, George; Walsh, Stephen; Fagre, Daniel, eds. (2009). The Changing Alpine Treeline, Volume 12: The Example of Glacier National Park, MT, USA. Elsevier Science. ISBN 978-0-444-53364-7.

== Glacier National Park geology and geography ==
The following references are primarily focused on the geology and geography within the park.

- Elrod, Morton J. (1912). Some Lakes of Glacier National Park (PDF). U.S. Department of Interior.
- Holterman, Jack (2006). Place Names of Glacier National Park. Helena, Montana: Riverbend Publishing. ISBN 1-931832-68-4.
- Hall M.H. & Fagre, D.B. (2003). "Modeled Climate-Induced Glacier Change in Glacier National Park, 1850–2100". BioScience. 53 (2): 131–140. doi:10.1641/0006-3568(2003)053[0131:MCIGCI]2.0.CO;2.
- "Monitoring and Assessing Glacier Changes and Their Associated Hydrologic and Ecologic Effects in Glacier National Park". U.S. Geological Survey, Northern Rocky Mountain Science Center. 2007. Archived from the original on 17 December 2007.
- Trails Illustrated-North Fork, Glacier National Park, Montana (314) (Map) (Revised ed.). 1:50000. National Geographic Maps. 2009. ISBN 978-1-56695-469-3.
- Trails Illustrated-Many Glacier, Glacier National Park, Montana (314) (Map) (Revised ed.). 1:50000. National Geographic Maps. 2009. ISBN 978-1-56695-470-9.
- Trails Illustrated-Two Medicine, Glacier National Park, Montana (315) (Map) (Revised ed.). 1:50000. National Geographic Maps. 2009. ISBN 978-1-56695-471-6.

== Historic structures ==
- "Many Glacier Hotel Historic Structure Report" (PDF). National Park Service. July 2002. Archived from the original (PDF) on January 14, 2012.

== Tourism and recreation ==
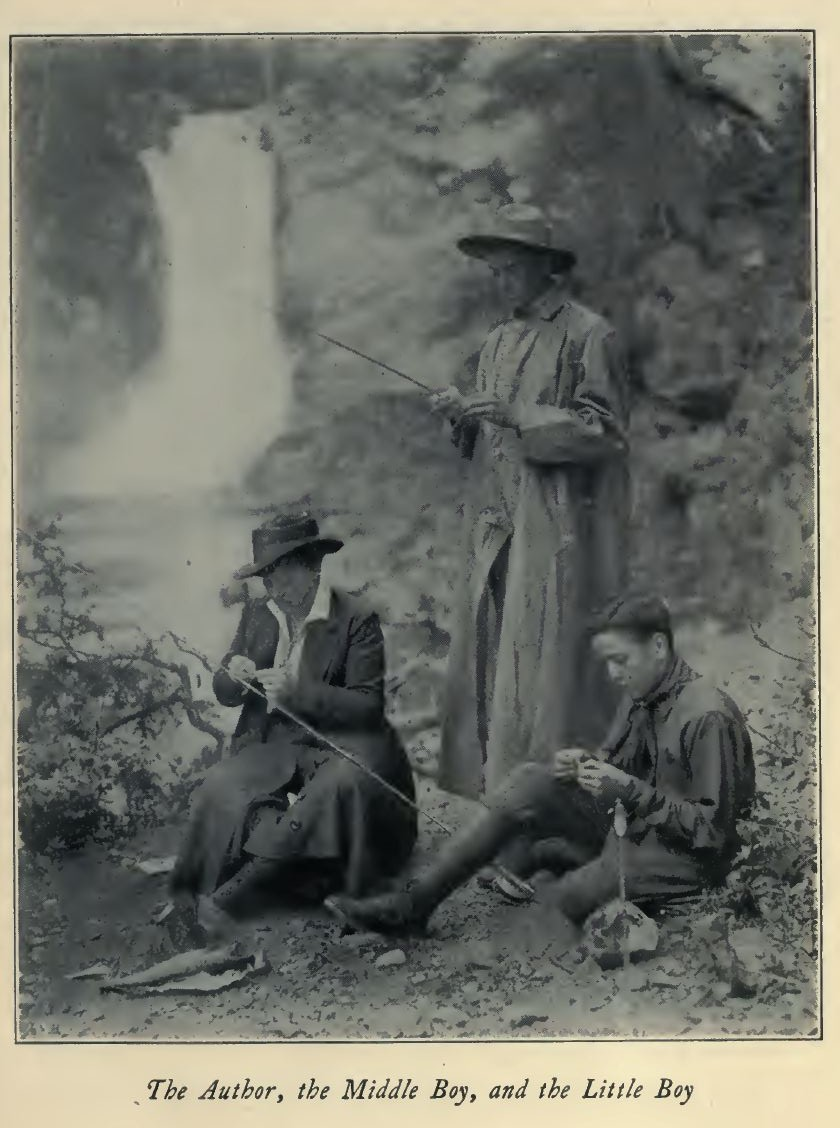
Mary Roberts Rinehart and children in Glacier, 1918

The following references are primarily related to promoting tourism and recreational opportunities in the park, to include memoirs and recollections of prominent tourist experiences.

- Rinehart, Mary Roberts (1916). Through Glacier Park-Seeing America First with Howard Eaton (PDF). Boston: Houghton Mifflin Company.
- Holtz, Mathilde Edith; Bemis, Katharine Isabel (1917). Glacier National Park: Its Trails and Treasures (PDF). New York: George H. Doran.
- Rinehart, Mary Roberts (1918). Tenting Tonight-A Chronicle of Sport and Adventure in Glacier Park and Cascade Mountains (PDF). Boston: Houghton Mifflin Company.
- Klussman, Henry (1922). A Trip To The Northwest By Automobile Touring Yellowstone Park & Glacier Park-Camping And Fishing On The Way (PDF). Toledo, OH: Henry Klussman.
- Orton, Vernon Lester (1933). Glacier Park Anthology and other poems. Vernon Orton.
- Edwards, J. Gordon; Gould, Josephine (1991). A Climber's Guide to Glacier National Park. Helena, MT: Falcon Press. ISBN 0-87842-177-7.
- Spring, Vicky; Kirkendall, Tom (1996). Glacier National Park and Waterton Lakes National Park: A Complete Recreation Guide. Mountaineers Books. ISBN 0-89886-367-8.
- Sample, Michael S. (1997). Glacier on My Mind. Helena, MT: Falcon Publishing Inc. ISBN 1-56044-542-4.
- Guthrie, C. W. (2004). All Aboard for Glacier. Helena, MT: Far Country Press. p. 43. ISBN 1-56037-276-1.
- Olin, Susan (2008). Insiders' Guide to Glacier National Park: Including the Flathead Valley and Waterton Lakes National Park. Helena, MT: Falcon Publishing, Inc. ISBN 978-0-7627-4404-6.

== Native Americans in Glacier National Park ==
The following references are primarily focused on the history of native americans within the park.

- Grinnell, George Bird (1892). Blackfoot Lodge Tales (PDF). New York: Charles Scribner's Sons.
- Grinnell, George Bird (1913). Blackfeet Indian Stories (PDF). New York: Charles Scribner's Sons.
- Schultz, James Willard (1907). My Life as an Indian-The Story of a Red Woman and a White Man in the Lodges of the Blackfeet (PDF). New York: Doubleday, Page & Company.
- Schultz, James Willard (1916). Blackfeet Tales of Glacier National Park. Boston: Houghton, Mifflin & Co. ISBN 9780598564146.
- Schultz, James Willard (1926). Signposts of Adventure:Glacier National Park as the Indians Know It. Boston: Houghton, Mifflin & Co.
- Reiss, Winold (1940). Blackfeet Indians of Glacier National Park. St. Paul, MN: Great Northern Railroad.
- Schultz, James Willard (1961). Blackfeet Man: Stories of the Famous Montana Indian Story Writer and an Original Map and Guide to the Beautiful Region He Loved (Montana Heritage Series). Helena, MT: Montana Historical Society.
- Hanna, Warren Leonard (1986). The Life and Times of James Willard Schultz (Apikuni). Norman, OK: University of Oklahoma Press. ISBN 0-8061-1985-3.
- Farr, William E. (2009). Julius Seyler And The Blackfeet: An Impressionist At Glacier National Park (the Charles M. Russell Center On Art And Photography Of The American West). Norman, OK: University of Oklahoma Press. ISBN 978-0-8061-4014-8.

== Bibliographies ==
- Hazel Hunt Voth, ed. (1940). Glacier National Park-A Bibliography (PDF). National Park Service. Archived from the original (PDF) on July 3, 2007.

== See also ==
- List of Glacier National Park (U.S.) related articles
