= Museum of the Rockies =

Museum in Bozeman, Montana, U.S.

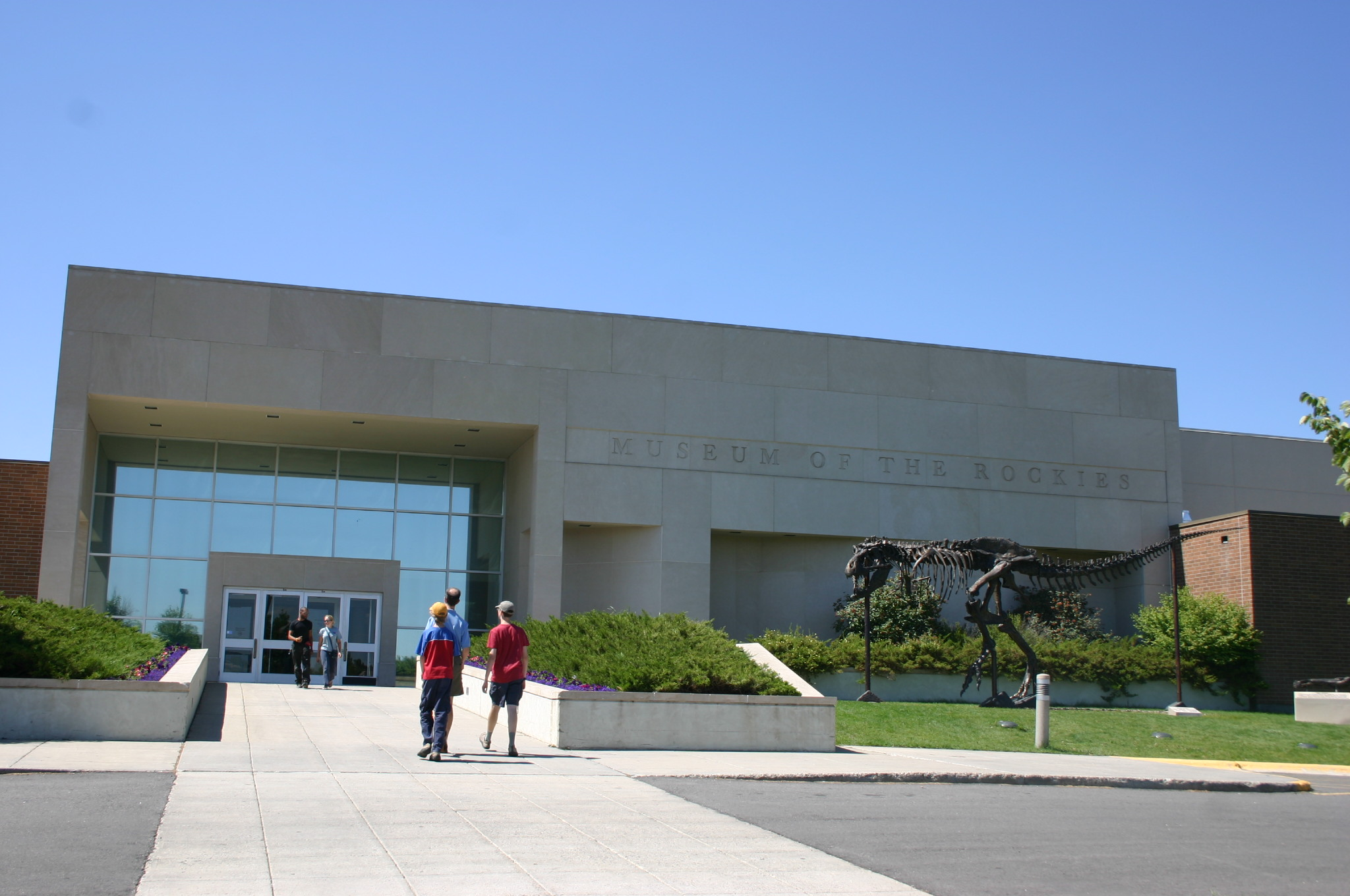
- Museum of the Rockies front entrance
- Established: 1957
- Location: 600 W. Kagy Boulevard, Bozeman, Montana, U.S.
- Coordinates: 45°39′32″N 111°02′44″W
- Type: General History Museum
- Director: Christopher Dobbs
- Curators: Dr. John Scannella, John R. Horner Curator of Paleontology; Michael Fox, Curator of History; Steve Jackson, Curator of Art & Photography
- Website: www.museumoftherockies.org

Museum of the Rockies is a museum in Bozeman, Montana. Originally affiliated with Montana State University in Bozeman, and now also, the Smithsonian Institution. The museum is largely known for its Paleontological collections as well as having the largest collection of North American Dinosaur fossils in the United States. They also possess the largest Tyrannosaurus skull ever discovered, as well as the thigh bone of a Tyrannosaurus rex that contains soft-tissue remains. The museum is part of the Montana Dinosaur Trail and is Montana's official repository for Paleontological specimens.

The museum's collections focus on the physical and cultural history of the Rocky Mountains and the people and animals who have lived there, and date back more than 500 million years. Permanent exhibits include: "History of the Northern Rocky Mountain Region", whose inhabitants included Native Americans, fur traders, gold seekers, and settlers from frontier days through World War II; the Living History Farm, which includes the Tinsley House, where costumed interpreters demonstrate life in a turn-of-the-century home; and the Taylor Planetarium, a 40 ft (12 m), 104-seat domed theater.

== Overview ==
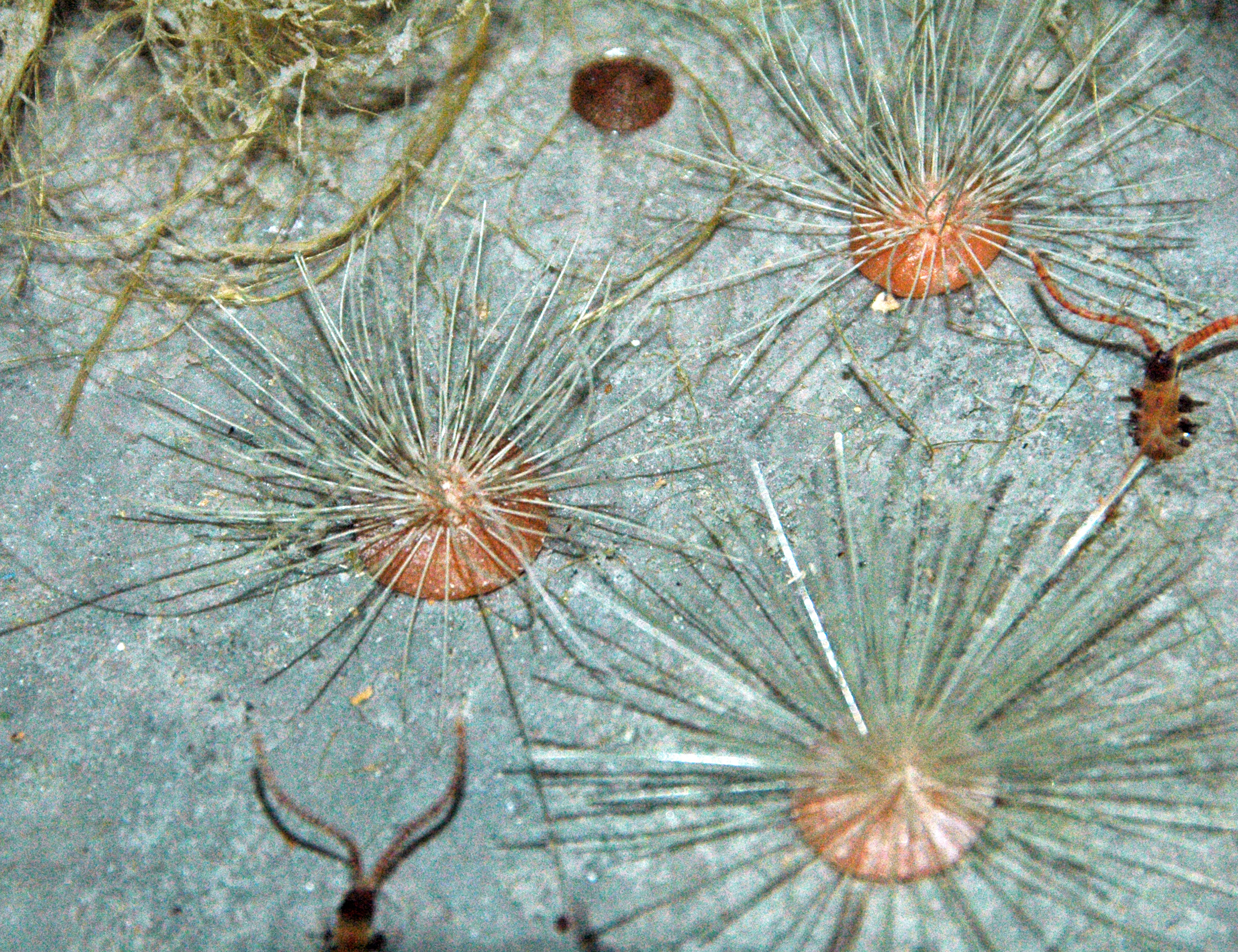
Dioramic reconstruction of Middle Cambrian sponge Choia and Annelid worms.

Museum of the Rockies preserves and tells the stories of Montana and the Northern Rockies, educating visitors about the region's rich history, which includes its Paleontological roots. The museum was founded in 1957, funded in part by a gift from Caroline M. McGill. The museum's collection has grown to include 300,000 objects that cover over 500,000,000 years of history. In 1980, the museum acquired over 10,000 photographs and negatives from the heirs of Albert, Alfred and Chris Schlechten (now known as the Schlechten collection). These photographs chronicle the Bozeman and Yellowstone National Park areas over two generations (from about 1905 until the late 1970s).

The museum offers symposiums, allowing Native Americans whose tribes called the region home to share their oral histories with visitors. In 2005, the museum became an affiliate of the Smithsonian Institution, which provided the museum greater access to the collections and programs of that institute.

Traveling exhibits that visit the museum have covered topics such as African American art, television and film costumes, the impact of weapons on the cultures of the Rocky Mountains, and King Tut.

== At the Museum ==
=== Tinsley House ===
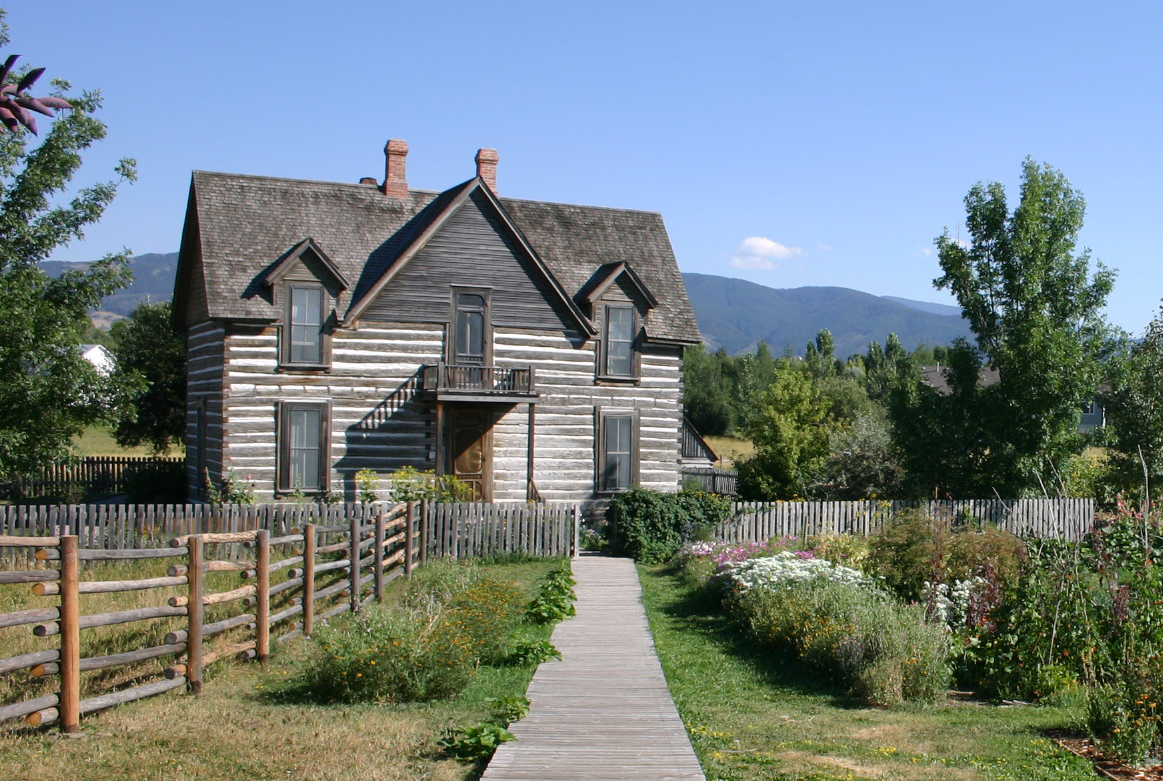
The Tinsley House

The Tinsley House (45°39′29″N 111°02′41″W) is preserved by the Museum of the Rockies as a living history museum. The 100+ year-old house was originally located in Willow Creek and it was moved to its present site (on more than 10 acres (40,000 m^{2})) in front of the museum in 1989. At the museum, visitors can learn about the life of the Tinsleys and others who lived at the time. The house includes a functioning outhouse, water pump and kitchen.

The Tinsleys migrated west during the American Civil War. William and Lucy [Nave] Tinsley met in Virginia City, Montana, where both worked. They relocated to the Gallatin Valley after they married. The Tinsleys built their house in 1889 when the original cabin became too small to accommodate their growing family. The house provides an overview of homestead life in the 1800s in the Gallatin Valley. The house was constructed of logs accumulated over the course of two years from the Tobacco Root Mountains.

=== Paleontology ===
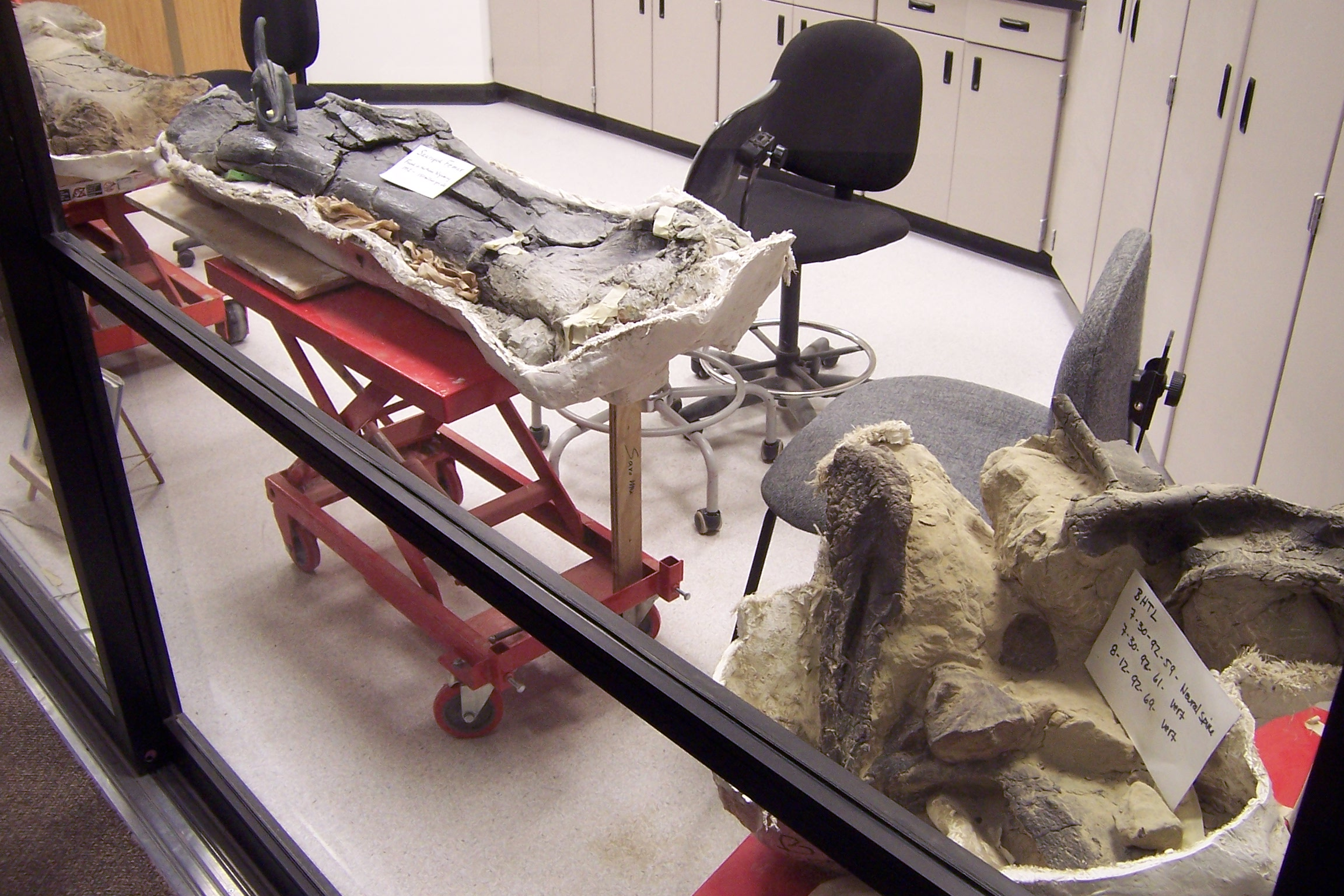
Visitors have a window into the process by which fossil pieces are assembled together.

While not its sole focus, the museum is primarily known for its paleontological collections. However, this was not always the case as specimens found in Montana were usually taken out of state to other museums. This changed in 1990 with the discovery of a Tyrannosaurus rex skeleton that would remain in Montana and be exhibited at the museum.

While fossils continue to be the property of the federal government, the museum has been able to increase its collection (due in part to Curator Jack Horner's agreement and work with the United States Fish and Wildlife Service and the Federal Bureau of Land Management). The museum is now home to 13 Tyrannosaurus rex specimens, including one of only two complete skeletons that have ever been found.

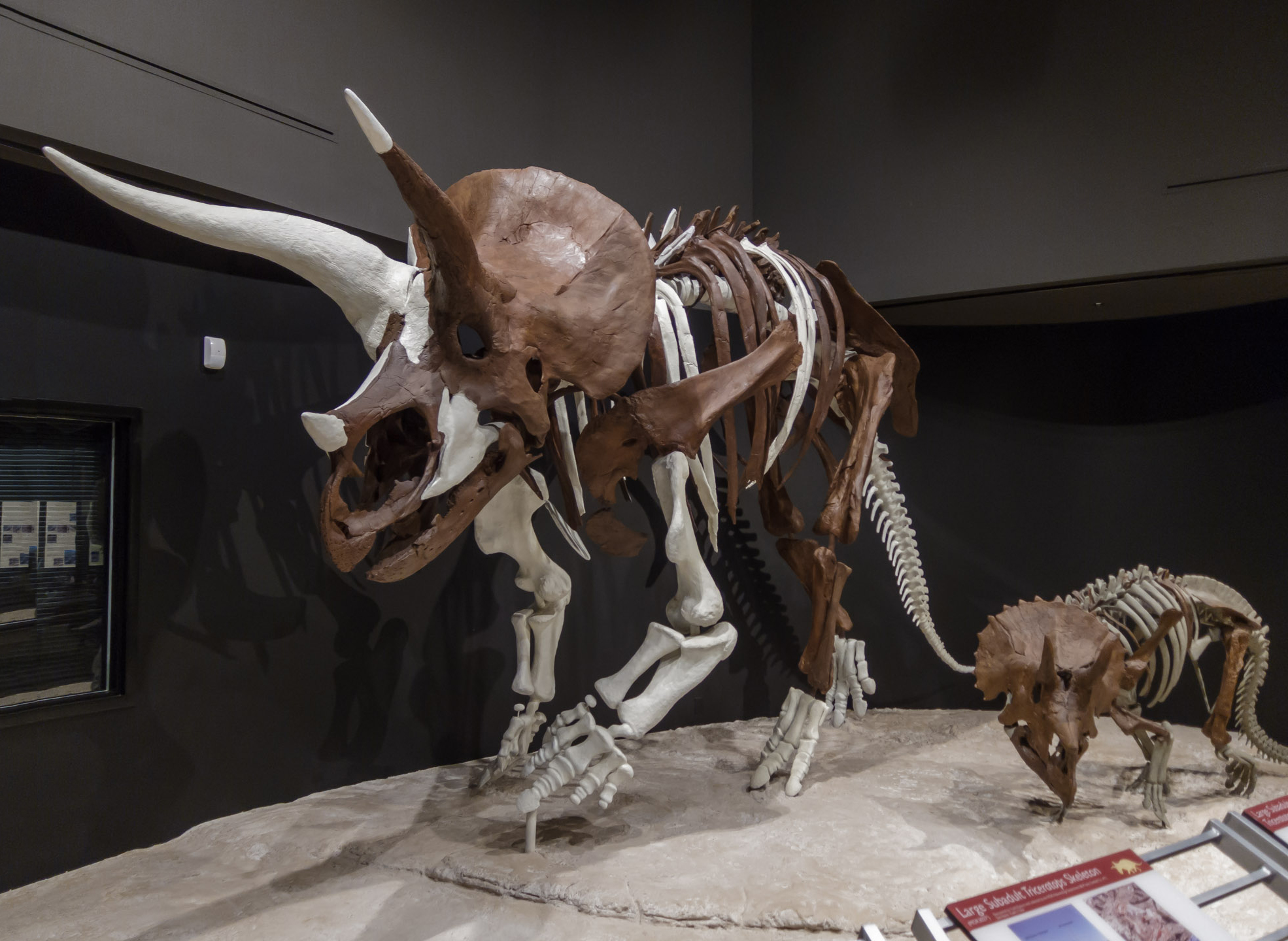
Triceratops on display: "Yoshi's Trike" (MOR 3027) and a baby.

Apart from housing one of the largest collections of dinosaur fossils in the world and the largest in the United States, the museum is also home to one of the world's largest Tyrannosaurus skulls (MOR 008) – narrowly surpassing that of the Chicago Field Museum's specimen, Sue. The museum's Siebel Dinosaur Complex is home to one of the first identified female dinosaurs, an ovulating T. rex. Curator Horner, who served as an adviser to the Jurassic Park films, was one of the lead scientists involved in the 2005 discovery of soft tissue remains in the thigh bone of a Tyrannosaurus, which were later brought to the museum. The museum has also been involved in a number of other finds, including a baby Triceratops in Jordan, Montana, in 2006, and "Yoshi's Trike" (MOR 3027), a large Triceratops specimen with 125 cm long horns, discovered in 2010.

In June 2008, the museum formed part of a consortium that obtained a mobile paleontology lab that would assist researchers, allowing them to chemically analyze fossils while still in the field in order to help prevent degradation.

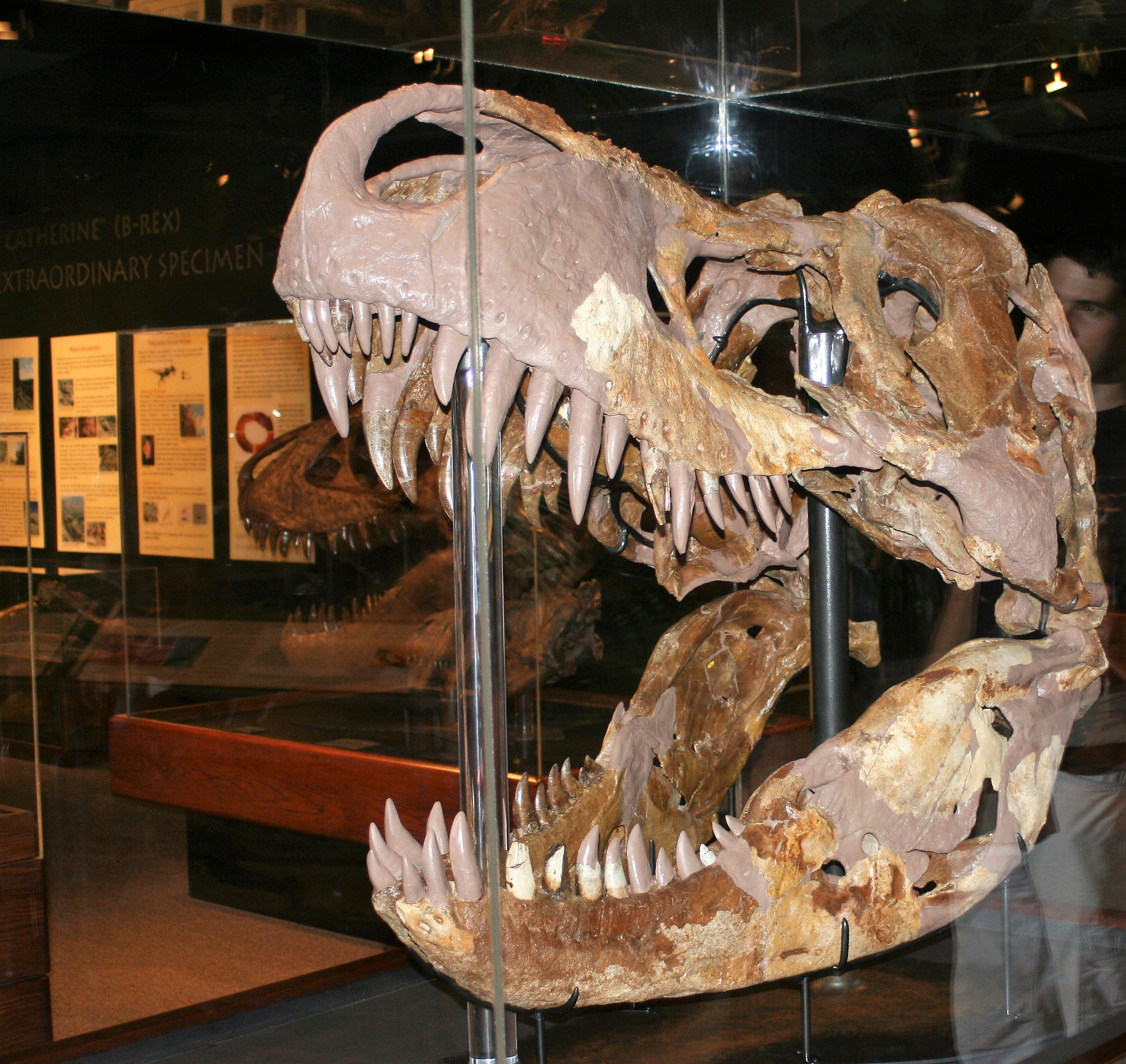
T. rex specimen MOR 008.

With the completion of MOR's new Curatorial Center for the Humanities in 2017 and the removal of humanities items to this new storage facility, the MOR Paleontology department gained about 11,000 square feet (1,000 m^{2}) of space in the museum's basement to expand the collection of fossils.

=== Curatorial Center for the Humanities ===
On April 28, 2016, the museum broke ground on a new $4 million, 20,000-square-foot (1,900 m^{2}) Curatorial Center for the Humanities (CCH). The facility was designed to provide storage and curatorial space for the museum's humanities collection, which includes art, archaeological, historic, Native American, and photographic items.

Completed in 2017, about 13,000 square feet (1,200 m^{2}) of the building is devoted to storage space, with the remaining 7,000 square feet (650 m^{2}) containing office and work space. Private donations paid for the entire cost of the structure, which meant that no state funds were used. Slate Architecture of Helena designed the structure. Bill Walker was the lead architect. Civil and structural engineering, as well as planning for the electrical system, mechanical system, and plumbing were provided by Morrison Maierle, Inc., of Bozeman. The general contractor was Jackson Contractor Group of Bozeman.

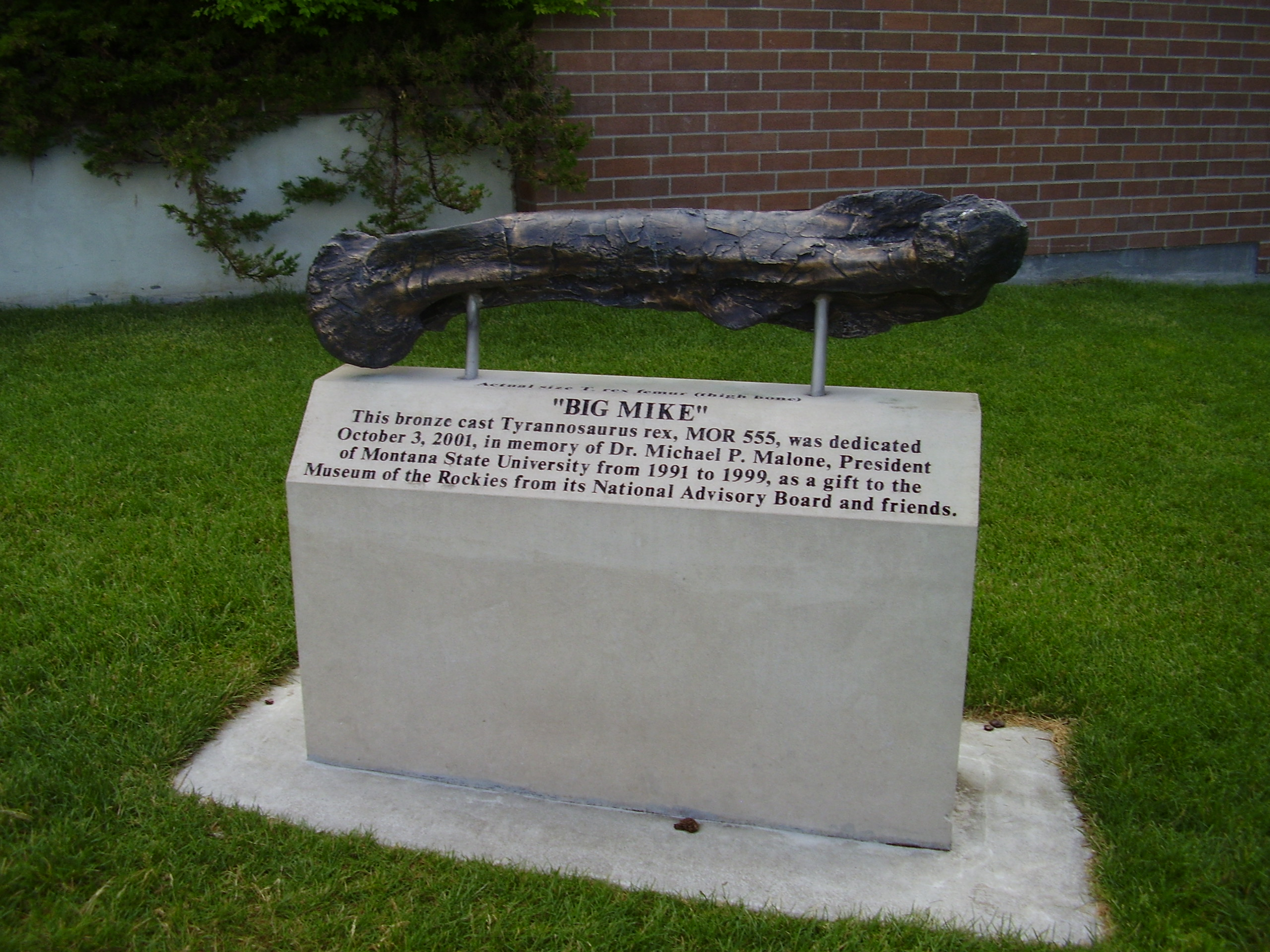
Bronze cast of "Big Mike" (T. rex) femur in front of the MOR building.

=== Education ===
Students from all over Montana can engage in school tours, homeschool programs, summer camps, and educational classes & lectures at the museum. There are even classes from Montana State University that undergraduates can take, including Undergrad Research, Museum Practices, Undergrad Research & Instruction, and an Independent study with the institution.
