= Joseph Kinsey Howard =

American journalist, historian, and writer (1906–1951)

Joseph Kinsey Howard (February 28, 1906 – August 25, 1951) was an American journalist, historian, and writer. He wrote extensively about the history, culture, and economic circumstances of Montana. One of the state's most noted authors of nonfiction, Howard's landmark 1943 book, Montana: High, Wide, and Handsome is a respected account of Montana history that has influenced later generations of historians. Howard also authored numerous other historic and literary works, and was a vocal, articulate and persuasive advocate for a variety of social, economic and environmental reforms. These endeavors earned Howard the posthumous sobriquet, "Montana's Conscience." Howard believed Montana and the rural West provided the "last stand against urban technological tedium" for the individual. He fervently believed that small towns of the sort that predominated in Montana provided a democratic bulwark for society. Howard's writings demonstrate his strong belief in the necessity to identify and preserve a region's cultural heritage. Howard worked first as a newspaper editor on the Great Falls Leader, later for the Montana Study (a statewide community development project), and as a freelance writer. His books, speeches and magazine articles, expressed his ideals of community awareness and identity, encouraging readers to retain an idealistic vision contesting the deadening demands of the modern world.

== Biography ==
Howard was born in Oskaloosa, Iowa, and spent his early childhood years in Lethbridge, Alberta, with his family. In 1919 he moved with his mother to Great Falls, Montana, where he graduated from high school in 1923. Immediately after graduating, Howard landed a job as a reporter for the Great Falls Leader, one of the city's two daily newspapers at the time. He was promoted to news editor at the Leader in 1926, at age 20, a position he held until 1944.

At the Leader, Howard developed a characteristic writing style that was simultaneously straightforward, evocative, and compelling, and within a few years his talent began to receive broader attention. Beginning in the mid-1930s Howard authored numerous nonfiction articles for national publications, including The Nation, Harper's Magazine and others. He was also a stringer covering Montana issues for Time and Life magazines. Many of the essays Howard produced for these periodicals explored the difficulties faced by Montana's Native Americans and other disenfranchised groups; others were exposés of what Howard saw as undue corporate influence in Montana economics and life, particularly by the Anaconda Copper Mining Company.

Though primarily an author of nonfiction, Howard also wrote book reviews for The New York Times and short stories that were published in The Saturday Evening Post, Esquire, and elsewhere.

Howard's first book-length effort was Montana: High, Wide, and Handsome, which was published in 1943. The volume was both a thoughtful history of the state, and an impassioned indictment of the corporate and bureaucratic forces that had heavily influenced much of that history. Among the book's primary targets were Anaconda Copper, which controlled much of the state's economic and political activity at the time, and the Great Northern Railway, which had lured thousands of homesteaders onto Montana land that proved wholly unsuitable for farming. The book also paid particular attention to the inappropriate and inequitable usage of the state's scarce water resources, making an open plea for reform of the system.

Montana: High, Wide, and Handsome proved to be an unquestioned landmark in the state's literary history, drawing significant attention both to Howard and the causes he espoused. The themes of corporate exploitation that Howard so convincingly and eloquently outlined became the primary focus of Montana historians for a generation to come, and became a primary theme in the works of K. Ross Toole, the state's most noted academic historian. Howard's book remains perhaps the most influential and evocative work ever published about Montana's past.

The recognition afforded Howard by the response to Montana: High, Wide, and Handsome helped open the doors to additional writing, research, and advocacy projects. In 1944 Howard resigned his position at the Leader to become a staff member of the Montana Study, a research project largely funded by the Rockefeller Foundation. The Study was an examination of life in small-town Montana, with the goal of identifying ways to improve the quality of life in such places and thus helping ensure their preservation. Howard remained with the Study for two years, before resigning in order to return to writing full-time.

Howard's second published volume was Montana Margins: A State Anthology, completed in 1946. The book is a thick collection of short fiction, poetry, and historic narratives, covering the full spectrum of Montana's geography and history. The depth and scope of the book made it a model for later regional anthologies, such as the voluminous 1988 imitation, The Last Best Place: A Montana Anthology.

The remainder of Howard's life was devoted to writing, promoting the arts in Montana, and teaching writers workshops. Aided by the support of Guggenheim Fellowships in 1947 and 1948, he devoted considerable effort to the writing of a history of Métis leader Louis Riel and his resistance movements against the Canadian government. The result of this project was the book Strange Empire: A Narrative of the Northwest, published posthumously in 1952.

Howard died of a heart attack on August 25, 1951, aged 45.

He is still recognized as one of Montana's most talented, influential, and significant authors. His legacy was summed up by Bernard DeVoto in 1952, who wrote, "By the time Howard died, he came closer to being the spokesman of the West than any other writer has ever been."

== Principal works ==
- Montana: High, Wide and Handsome. New Haven: Yale University Press, 1943.
- Montana Margins: A State Anthology. New Haven: Yale University Press, 1946.
- Strange Empire: A Narrative of the Northwest. New York: William Morrow & Co., 1952.
