= K. Ross Toole =

K. Ross Toole

Kenneth Ross Toole (August 8, 1920 – August 13, 1981) was an American historian, author, and educator who specialized in the history of Montana. Perhaps the best-known and most influential of the state's twentieth-century historians, Toole served as director of the state's historical society, authored several noted volumes of state history and social commentary, and was a popular professor at the University of Montana for 16 years. He supported environmental protection for Montana's resources, and voiced strong support for labor unions and farmers over big business, especially targeting the railroad and mining industries. These views frequently came into conflict with those of the Anaconda Copper Company and some Montana politicians, most notably Governor J. Hugo Aronson (served 1953–1961). Toole's views on the role of corporate dominance in Montana history were often controversial, and have been hotly debated by historians.

== Biography ==
Toole was born and raised in Missoula, Montana, to a family whose ancestors had been in the state since the mid-nineteenth century. After graduating from high school, he studied at Georgetown University and the University of Montana before enlisting in the United States Navy during World War II. After the war, Toole returned to Missoula and obtained bachelor's and master's degrees in history at the University of Montana. He completed a PhD in history at the University of California, Los Angeles in 1951.

That same year, Toole was appointed Director of the Montana Historical Society (MHS), based in Helena. Toole did much to improve the stature of the Society during his tenure there, though he was frustrated by the political nature of the post. His relationship with state political and business leaders was further strained when Toole founded a short-lived periodical titled Montana Opinion, which featured articles exposing political corruption and economic injustice in the state.

Toole left MHS in 1957 and accepted a position as Director of the Museum of the City of New York. Two years later, he moved to Santa Fe to work as Director of the Museum of New Mexico. He returned to Montana in 1963 and operated a ranch near the town of Red Lodge.

Toole's passion for Montana and its history remained strong in the years following his departure from MHS, as evidenced by the 1959 publication of his book, Montana: An Uncommon Land. The volume was a seminal history of the state, firmly establishing Toole as the Montana's preeminent living historian, and outlining Toole's long-standing thesis that the state's history was strongly shaped by the exploitation of its natural resources by corporate outsiders. In this belief, Toole was expanding on ideas first published by Joseph Kinsey Howard, another of the state's leading historians, in his 1943 book Montana: High, Wide, and Handsome.

Following a heart attack and a physician's recommendation to avoid ranch work, Toole returned to the profession of history in 1965, accepting the position of A.B. Hammond Professor of Western History at the University of Montana (UM). He remained at the university until his death, and is best remembered there for teaching a class titled "Montana and the West," which drew several hundred students each year. His entertaining and often fiery class lectures made Toole's class the most popular of the university's offerings at the time, and his final series of class lectures remain available today on videotape.

Toole continued to write on Montana history topics while at UM, publishing Twentieth-century Montana: A State of Extremes in 1972. His concerns about corporate exploitation of the state's natural resources were discussed in his 1974 book, The Rape of the Great Plains. Toole also gained notoriety of a different sort in the late 1960s, when his frustration with student radicalism of the era resulted in his publication of a book with the cumbersome title, The Time Has Come to Say the Things that Need to be Said About Campus Violence, the Tyranny of a Minority, the Crusade of the Spoiled Children, the Parental Abdication of Responsibility, and the Lack of Courage, Integrity, and Wisdom on the Part of Our Educational Leaders. This book was based upon a letter to his brothers expressing his feelings about student activism and was popularly known as, "The Tyranny of Spoiled Brats."

Throughout his tenure at UM, Toole remained an outspoken advocate for environmental responsibility and political ethics. Though undergoing treatment for the lung cancer that ultimately killed him, he spent the first months of 1981 living in Helena, writing and "keeping an eye on the Legislature." His 1981 writing project remained unfinished, though, and Toole died in a Missoula hospital that August. He remains, however, the state's best-known academic historian, with an influence that continues to be felt today.

== Principal works ==
- A History of Montana (with Merrill G. Burlingame). New York: Lewis Historical Publishing Co., 1957.
- Montana: An Uncommon Land. Norman: University of Oklahoma Press, 1959. ISBN 0-8061-1890-3.
- The Time Has Come. New York: William Morrow & Co., 1971.
- Twentieth-century Montana: A State of Extremes. Norman: University of Oklahoma Press, 1972. ISBN 0-8061-0992-0
- The Rape of the Great Plains: Northwestern America, Cattle and Coal. Boston: Little, Brown and Co., 1976. ISBN 0-316-84990-1
- Montana: Images of the Past (with William E. Farr). Boulder, Colorado: Pruett Publishing Co., 1978. ISBN 0-87108-666-2.
