= Montana Vigilantes =

Period in American history from 1863 to 1889

The history of vigilante justice and the Montana Vigilantes began in 1863 in what was at the time a remote part of eastern Idaho Territory. Vigilante activities continued, although somewhat sporadically, through the Montana Territorial period until the territory became the state of Montana on November 8, 1889. Vigilantism arose because territorial law enforcement and the courts had very little power in the remote mining camps during the territorial period.

In 1863–1864, Montana Vigilantes followed the model of the San Francisco Committee of Vigilance that existed in 1850s California to bring order to lawless communities in and around the gold fields of Alder Gulch and Grasshopper Creek. There are estimates that over 100 persons were killed in "road agent" robberies in the fall of 1863. The Vigilance Committee of Alder Gulch organized in December 1863, and in the first six weeks of 1864 at least 20 road agents of the infamous Plummer gang, known as the "Innocents", were captured and hanged by the organization. Formal territorial law reached Alder Gulch in late 1864 with the arrival of Territorial Judge Hezekiah L. Hosmer and vigilante activity ceased in the region.

As the gold fields of Alder Gulch and Grasshopper Creek declined in 1865, prospectors and fortune seekers migrated to newly discovered areas in and around Last Chance Gulch (now Helena, Montana). As lawlessness increased, vigilante justice continued there with the formation of the Committee of Safety in 1865. During the period 1865–1870, at least 14 alleged criminals were executed by Helena's vigilantes. In 1884, ranchers in Central and Eastern Montana resorted to vigilante justice to deal with cattle rustlers and horse thieves. The best-known vigilante group in that area was "Stuart's Stranglers", organized by Granville Stuart in the Musselshell region. As formal law enforcement became more prevalent in the region, vigilantism fell into decline.

Vigilantism in pre-territorial and territorial Montana has been written about, romanticized and chronicled in personal memoirs, biographies, documentary and scholarly works, film and fiction for well over a century. The first book published in Montana was Thomas J. Dimsdale's 1866 first edition of The Vigilantes of Montana, which was compiled from a series of newspaper articles he wrote for the Montana Post in 1865. Historical analysis of the period ranges from disrepute to heroism, with debates over whether the lack of any functioning justice system and the understanding of due process at the time meant the vigilantes acted in a way they thought was best for their communities or if modern standards of due process should govern analysis of their actions.

== Bannack and Virginia City ==
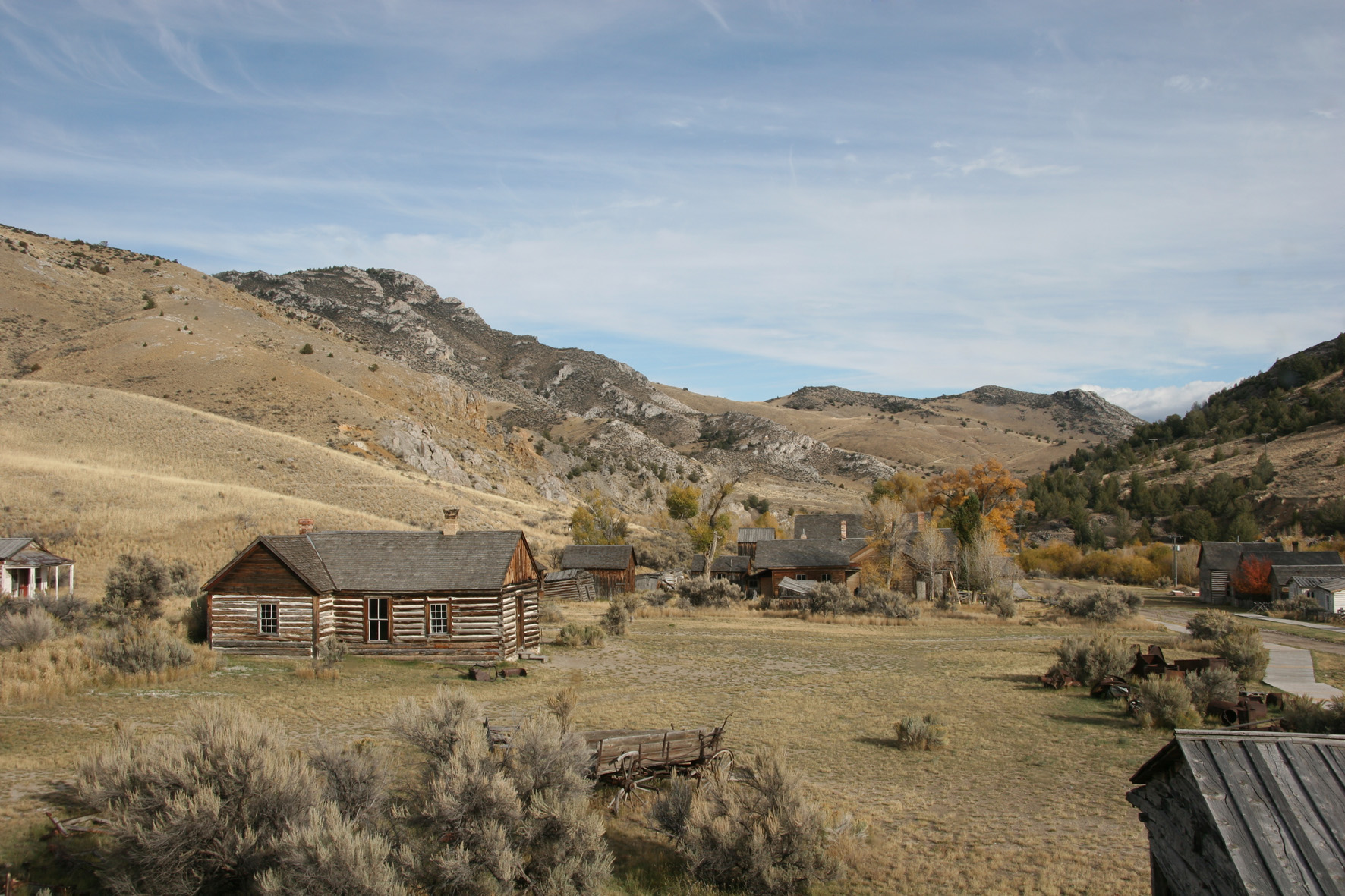
Bannack, Montana (2005)

On July 28, 1862, gold was discovered along Grasshopper Creek, a tributary of the Beaverhead River, in a remote part of eastern Idaho Territory, leading to the establishment of the town of Bannack. Bannack was a gold rush boomtown that was the first territorial capital of Montana Territory for a brief period after the territory was established in 1864. Less than a year after the Grasshopper Creek find, on May 26, 1863, gold was discovered along Alder Gulch, a tributary creek northeast of the Ruby River that lies between the Tobacco Root Mountains and the Gravelly Range and 70 miles (110 km) east of Bannack. The Alder Gulch find became one of the largest placer mining gold fields in the western U.S. The mining settlements of Virginia City and Nevada City, Montana, which sprang up in Alder Gulch, boasted thousands of prospectors and fortune seekers by the end of 1863. These new settlements generally lacked justice systems found in populated portions of the territory, such as in the territorial capital in Lewiston, Idaho. In 1863, gold was the preferred form of currency in western frontier communities and had a value, fixed and guaranteed by the U.S. Government, of $20.67 per ounce. Almost all economic transactions in western mining communities were accomplished with gold nuggets, flakes or dust as currency and not surprisingly, the more gold one had, the more wealth one possessed. During the early years of the territory, there was no secure way to transport wealth out of the region. The only means of transporting wealth out of the Alder Gulch gold fields was via horseback or slow moving wagons and stagecoaches on a limited number of trails and primitive roads leading south and west to Salt Lake City and San Francisco or east to Minnesota. Roads and trails leading to Alder Gulch included the Bozeman and Bridger Trails connecting to the Oregon Trail from the east, the Mullan Road from points west and from Fort Benton, Montana the head of navigation on the Missouri River and the Corinne Road from Corinne, Utah and points south. Additionally, there was a single track, 70-mile (110 km) stage road that connected Alder Gulch with Bannack. Several commercial freight and two passenger stage companies, Peabody and Caldwell's and A.J. Oliver's, operated on this route. Stagecoaches had to stop at several different ranches during the trip to water and change horses, feed passengers and provide overnight lodging. One of these ranches, the Rattlesnake Ranch, was owned by Bill Bunton and Frank Parish, who were later hanged by the vigilantes as road agents and members of the Plummer gang.

=== Road agents and the Plummer gang ===
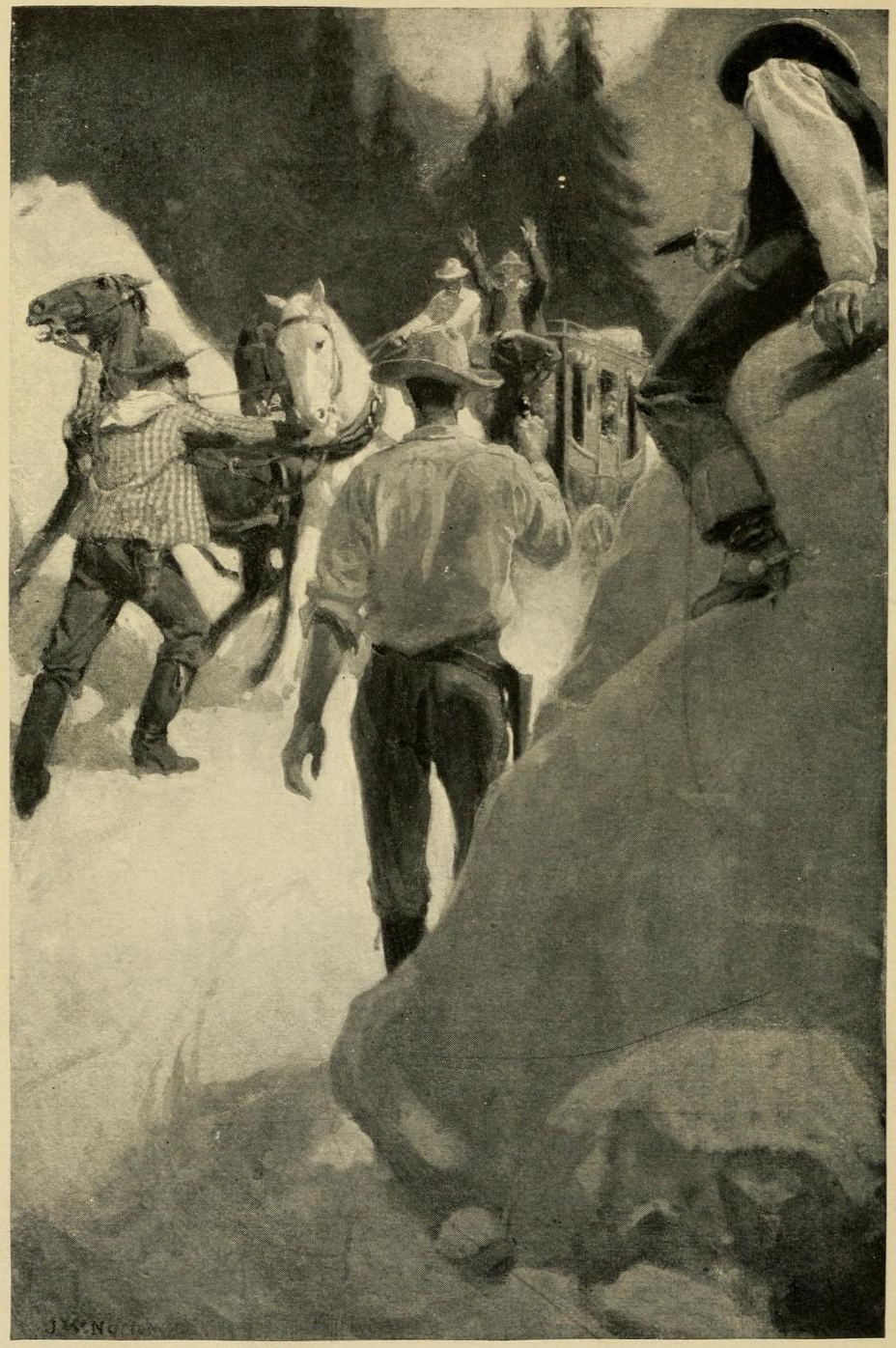
1907 Painting by John W. Norton of Henry Plummer's gang holding up and robbing a stagecoach

In a region where valuable gold was plentiful, transportation was insecure and effective law and order was lacking, travelers became easy prey for robbers. By late 1863, thefts and murders along the routes in and around Alder Gulch had become common. In their writings about the vigilantes, Thomas Dimsdale and Nathaniel P. Langford estimated that at least 102 travelers were killed by robbers in the fall of 1863. Many more travelers left the region and were never heard from again. As this became a more frequent occurrence locals began suspecting that these crimes were being carried out by a single group of outlaws, known as "road agents", under the control of Bannack sheriff Henry Plummer. The gang became known as the Innocents because of their passwords, I am innocent.

==== Notorious robberies, attempted robberies and murders in 1863 ====
- On October 13, 1863, Lloyd Magruder was killed by road agent Chris Lowrie. Magruder was an Idaho merchant leaving Virginia City with $12,000 in gold dust from goods he had sold there. Several of the men he hired to accompany him back to Lewiston, Idaho were in fact criminals. Four other men in the party were also murdered in camp - Charlie Allen, Robert Chalmers, Horace Chalmers and William Phillips - by Lowrie, Doc Howard, Jem Romaine and William Page.
- On October 26, 1863, the Peabody and Caldwell's stage was robbed between the Rattlesnake Ranch and Bannack by two road agents believed to be Frank Parish and George Ives. Bill Bunton, the owner of the Rattlesnake Ranch who joined the stage at the ranch was also complicit in the robbery. The road agents netted $2,800 in gold from the passengers and threatened them all with death if they talked about the robbery.
- On November 13, 1863, a teenage Henry Tilden was in the employ of Wilbur Sanders and Sidney Edgerton to locate and corral some horses owned by Sanders and Edgerton. Near Horse Prairie, Tilden was confronted by three armed road agents. He was carrying very little money and was allowed to depart unmolested, but with the warning that if he talked, he would be killed. He did not heed the warning and told Sanders' wife, Hattie and Sidney Edgerton that he had recognized one of the road agents as sheriff Henry Plummer. Although Tilden's report was discounted because Plummer was respected, this incident led to increased suspicion in the region that Plummer was the leader of a gang of road agents.

Henry Plummer

- On November 22, 1863, the A.J. Oliver stage was robbed on its way to Bannack from Virginia City by road agents George Ives, "Whiskey Bill" Graves and Bob Zachary. The robbery netted less than $1,000 in gold and treasury notes. One of the victims, Leroy Southmayd made the mistake of reporting the robbery and identifying the road agents to Bannack Sheriff, Henry Plummer. Members of Plummer's gang confronted Southmayd on his return trip to Virginia City, but Southmayd was cunning enough to avoid injury or death.
- In November 1863, Conrad Kohrs traveled to Bannack from Deer Lodge, Montana with $5,000 in gold dust to buy cattle. A conversation with Sheriff Plummer in Bannack led Kohrs to believe he might be robbed while on the trail back to Deer Lodge. While in an overnight camp his associates located road agents George Ives and "Dutch John" Wagner surveying the camp, armed with shotguns. A day or two later, Kohrs was on horseback returning to Deer Lodge when Ives and Wagner gave chase. Kohrs' horse proved the faster and he evaded confrontation before reaching the safety of Deer Lodge.
- In early December 1863, a three wagon freight outfit organized by Milton S. Moody was going to Salt Lake City from Virginia City. Among the seven passengers was John Bozeman. The freight wagons were carrying $80,000 in gold dust and $1,500 in treasury notes. While camped on Blacktail Deer Creek, road agents "Dutch John" Wagner and Steve Marshland entered the camp, armed and ready to rob the train. Members of the camp had armed themselves well and Wagner and Marshland were able to escape, claiming they were just looking for lost horses. Two days later, Wagner and Marshland were both wounded in an unsuccessful attempt to rob the wagon train as it crossed the Continental Divide at Rock Creek.
- On December 8, 1863, Anton Holter (who later became a Montana Power Company executive and had Holter Dam named for him), who was taking oxen to sell in Virginia City, survived an attempted robbery and murder. When road agents George Ives and Aleck Carter, whom Holter recognized, discovered Holter was not carrying any significant wealth, they tried to shoot him. He was able to avoid being shot and escaped into the brush.

=== The failure of miners' courts ===
Prior to the creation of the Montana Territory on May 26, 1864, and the arrival of the territorial courts, the only court system available for the residents of Bannack and Virginia City were the informal miners' courts. The miners' courts were a vehicle of the organized mining districts to resolve mining claims and disputes between miners in the district. When confronted with a major crime such as murder, they usually proved ineffective at resolving the crime to the satisfaction of the community.

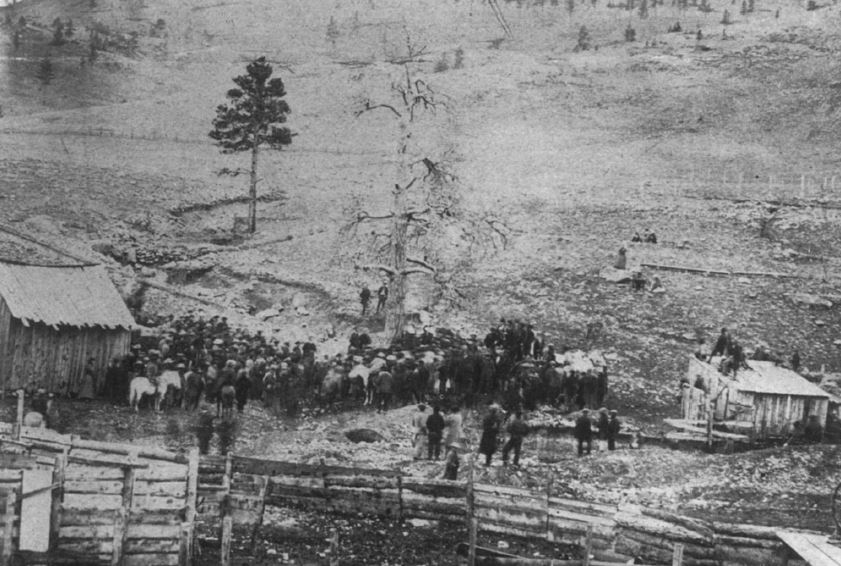
1870 vigilante execution of Arthur Compton and Joseph Wilson in Helena, Montana]

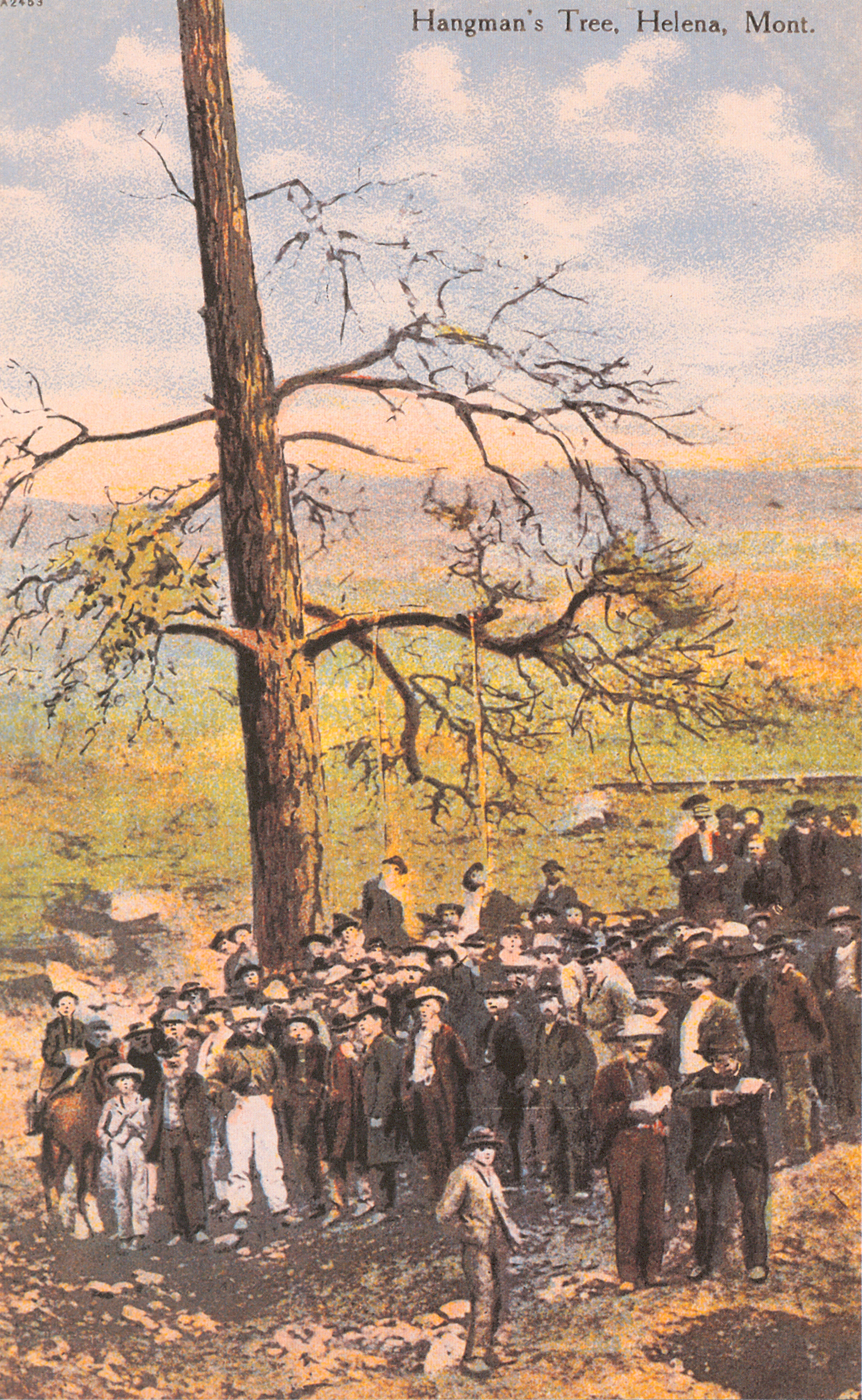
Lynching of Compton and Wilson 1870

While there are not many accounts of early courts in Alder Gulch, probably due to their informality and short existence, John X. Beidler recalled a murder trial in the Virginia City miners' court in his memoirs. The trial was in the fall of 1863 and concerned the murder of J.W. Dillingham. The trial was held outside, due to the fact that every resident took part. In the end all three defendants were set free. The first, Charley Forbes, was freed after he gave an eloquent and sentimental speech about his mother. The other two, Buck Stinson and Haze Lyons, were convicted and set to be the first men executed in what would become the state of Montana. However, at what would be a very public hanging friends and sympathizers of Stinson and Lyons convinced the crowd to vote again on the execution. Two attempts at counting the vote were made according to Beidler. The first people voting 'hang' were to walk up-hill while those voting 'no hang' were to walk down-hill. This vote was rejected and the next attempt had four men form two gates and people would cast their vote by walking through the 'hang' gate or the 'no hang' gate. Beidler claims that friends of the condemned men simply walked through the 'no hang' gate repeatedly casting fraudulent votes that possibly allowed two murderers to walk free.

On December 19–21, 1863, a public trial was held of George Ives, the suspected murderer of Nicholas Tiebolt, a young Dutch immigrant. Hundreds of miners from around the area attended the 3-day, outdoor trial. George Ives was prosecuted by Wilbur F. Sanders and Ives was convicted and hanged on December 21, 1863. Sanders played a prominent role in Montana history and eventually became the first U.S. Senator from Montana when the territory gained statehood in 1889. While the Ives trial resulted in an execution many residents were frustrated by a cumbersome process that could easily be manipulated. This sentiment is illustrated by a quote from Thomas Dimsdale who wrote the first published account of the Montana Vigilantes, originally written in 1865 as a series of articles for the Montana Post and later compiled into a book.

Another powerful incentive to wrong-doing is the absolute nullity of the civil law in such cases. No matter what may be the proof, if the criminal is well liked in the community 'Not Guilty' is almost certain to be the verdict, despite the efforts of the judge and prosecutor.

— Vigilantes of Montana, Thomas Dimsdale, 1865

=== Formation of the Vigilance Committee ===
On December 23, 1863, two days after the Ives trial, a group of five Virginia City residents, led by Wilbur F. Sanders, and including Major Alvin W. Brockie, John Nye, Captain Nick D. Wall and Paris Pfouts organized the Vigilance Committee of Alder Gulch. The committee was organized similar to the earlier San Francisco Committee of Vigilance (1851–56) in California of which some of the Alder Gulch organizers were familiar with. The original committee oath signed by its earliest members was:

We the undersigned uniting ourselves in a party for the laudable purpos [sic] of arresting thievs [sic] & murderers & recovering stollen [sic] property do pledge ourselves upon our sacred honor each to all others & solemnly swear that we will reveal no secrets, violate no laws of right & never desert each other or our standard of justice so help us God as witness our hand and seal this 23 of December ad 1863

— From original signed oath document held by Montana Historical Society

Paris Pfouts was elected as the president of the committee which drafted and adopted a comprehensive set of by-laws establishing a formal structure and process. The by-laws established the position of president, an executive officer, an executive committee, a secretary, treasurer and positions of captains and lieutenants of companies. The most relevant process contained in the by-laws was:

It shall be the duty of members to attach themselves to some company and whenever any criminal act shall come to their knowledge to inform his Captain or Lieutenant of the same, when the officers so informed shall call together the members of his Company, (unless the Company has chosen a committee for such purpose) when they shall proceed to investigate the case, and elicit the facts and should the said company conclude that the person charged with any offense should be punished by the committee, the Captain or Lieutenant will first take steps to arrest the Criminal and then report same with proof to the Chief who will thereupon call a meeting of the Executive Committee and the judgement of such Executive Committee shall be final. The only punishment that shall be inflicted by this Committee is death.

— By-laws of Vigilance Committee of Alder Gulch (1863)

=== Prominent members ===
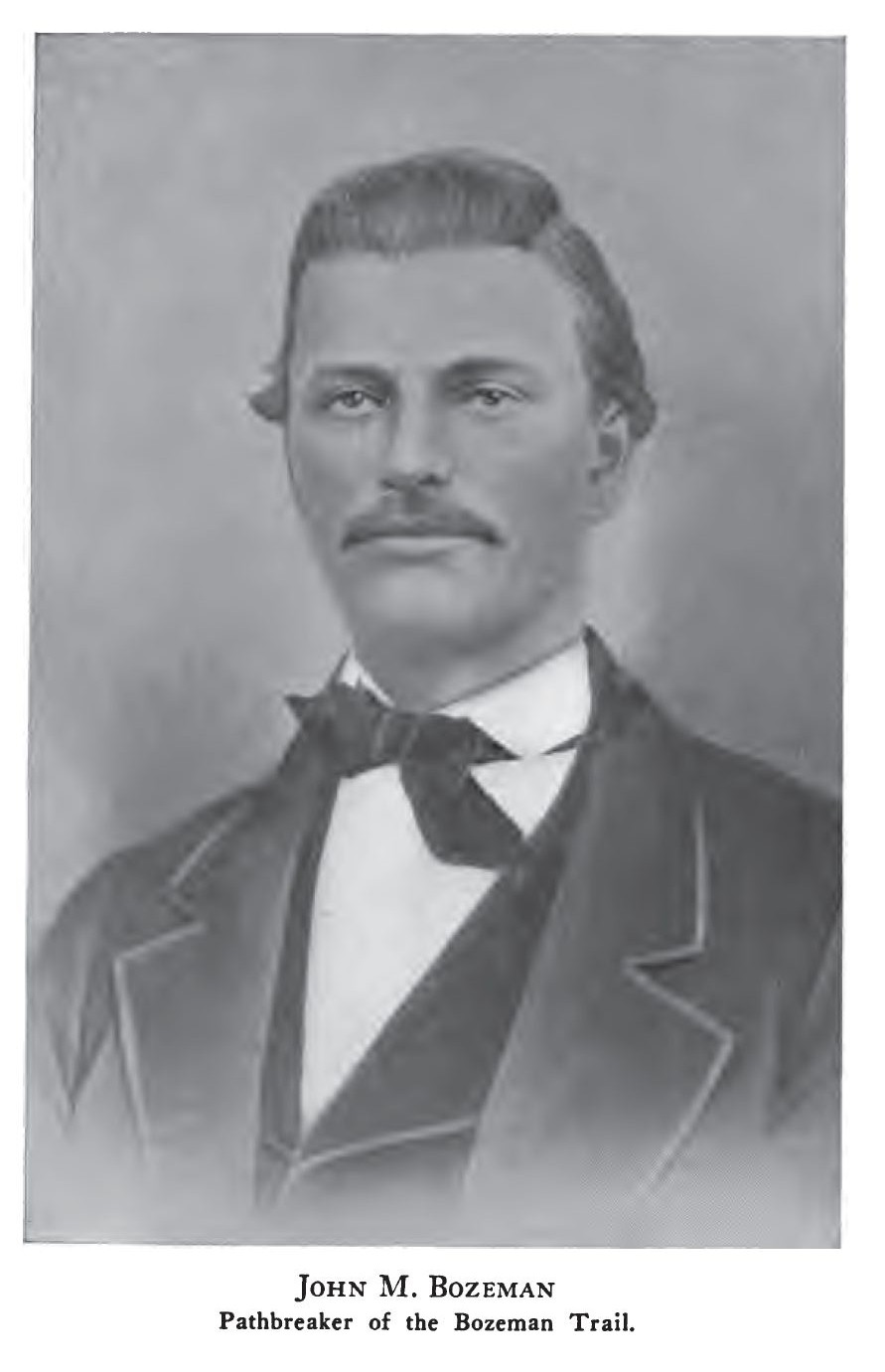
John Bozeman

Although the vigilance committee started as a small secret institution in Virginia City, knowledge of it soon spread in the territory and membership grew. As a secret organization, exact accounts of membership vary, but many members became prominent in the history of the territory and state. Among those who were members include Wilbur Sanders (1st U.S. Senator from Montana (1890)), Sidney Edgerton (first Governor of Montana Territory (1864)), Nelson Story (famous for his 1866 cattle drive from Texas to Bozeman and prominent Bozeman merchant), John Bozeman (founder of Bozeman, Montana (1864) and the Bozeman Trail), Nathaniel P. Langford (first Yellowstone National Park superintendent (1872–1877)), James Stuart (brother of Granville Stuart, who would form the Stuarts' Stranglers in 1884), Tom Cover (one of the Alder Gulch prospectors who discovered the first gold there and alleged murderer of John Bozeman (1867)) and Thomas Dimsdale (editor of Montana's first newspaper, the Montana Post and author of The Vigilantes of Montana (1866)).

Due to the secret nature of the organization it is difficult to be sure when an execution was carried out by the vigilance committee or another group of motivated citizens. In the months following the Ives trial many suspected road agents were hanged. Notable among those hanged was Henry Plummer, the sheriff of Bannack, who was suspected by many of being the ringleader of the road agents. The Montana Vigilantes hanged men using the testimony of other men who faced their imminent executions as the sole evidence. Of the few accounts of the early actions of the Alder Gulch Vigilantes, Beidler and Dimsdale are the most complete, although they give little information about the secret trials conducted by the vigilantes. Estimates vary, but noted vigilante historian Frederick Allen believes that between the years 1863 and 1865 somewhere from 15 to 35 people were killed due to the actions of the Alder Gulch vigilantes.

=== Vigilante justice ===
Over a course of approximately six weeks between December 1863 and February 1864, vigilante companies located, arrested and executed suspected members of the Plummer road agent gang in Bannack, Virginia City and Hellgate, Montana.

==== Bannack ====
Shortly after its formation, the Vigilance Committee dispatched a posse of men to search for Aleck Carter, "Whiskey Bill" Graves and Bill Bunton, known associates of George Ives. The posse was led by vigilante Captain James Williams, the man who had investigated the Nicolas Tiebolt murder by George Ives. Near the Rattlesnake Ranch on the Ruby River, the posse located "Erastus Red" Yeager and George Brown, both suspected road agents. While traveling back to Virginia City, Yeager made a complete confession, naming the majority of the road agents in Plummer's gang, including Henry Plummer. After obtaining the confession, Yeager and Brown were found guilty by the posse and summarily hanged from a cottonwood tree on the Lorrain's Ranch on the Ruby River. On January 6, 1864, "Dutch John" Wagner, a road agent wounded in the Moody robbery was captured by vigilante Captain Nick Wall and Ben Peabody on the Salt Lake City trail. The vigilantes transported Wagner to Bannack where he was hanged on January 11, 1864. By this time, Yeager's confession had mobilized vigilantes against Plummer and his key associates, deputies Buck Stinson and Ned Ray. Plummer, Stinson and Ray were arrested on the morning of January 10, 1864 and summarily hanged. On January 11, 1864, "Greaser Joe" Pizanthia, a road agent on Yeager's list, was located in his cabin just outside Bannack. A gunfight ensued that took the life of one vigilante, George Copley. Pizanthia's cabin was bombarded with three shells from a mountain howitzer belonging to Sidney Edgerton. The bombardment severely wounded Pizanthia and he was shot and killed as he was removed from the wreckage of the cabin.

==== Virginia City ====
After Wagner's execution on January 11, 1864, the vigilantes, who were mostly men from Virginia City, returned there to deal with the remaining road agents in the Plummer gang. On the evening of January 13, 1864, the Vigilance Committee voted to arrest and hang six road agents believed to be living in Virginia City - Frank Parish, Boone Helm, Hayes Lyons, Jack Gallagher, George "Clubfoot" Lane and Bill Hunter. On the morning of January 14, 1864, five of the six road agents were located in town and arrested. They were all summarily hanged from a beam in a building under construction on Wallace Street. Bill Hunter escaped capture in Virginia City, but was later arrested at a cabin on the Gallatin River and was hanged from a cottonwood tree on February 3, 1864.

After the January 14, 1864 hangings, the vigilante companies left Virginia City in search of the remaining road agents on Yeager's list. The first to be located was Steve Marshland holed up in a cabin on the Big Hole River and was hanged on January 16, 1864. A posse led by Captain Williams found Bill Bunton at his Cottonwood Ranch on the Ruby River and hanged him on January 18, 1864.

==== Hell Gate ====
After the Bunton execution, the vigilante companies regrouped and made a 90-mile (140 km) ride to Hell Gate, Montana where they believed more road agents were hiding. In Hell Gate, Captain William's vigilante company located and arrested Cyrus Skinner, Aleck Carter, and John Cooper. A vigilante trial of Skinner and Carter was held in the Worden and Higgins dry goods store on January 24, 1864. Both men were found guilty and hanged outside the store. Later that same day, Cooper was tried, convicted and hanged. On January 25, 1864, the vigilantes located Bob Zachary in a cabin outside of Hell Gate and George Shears in another cabin in the Bitterroot Valley. Zachary was brought to Hell Gate and hanged. Shears was hanged outside the cabin he was captured in. As the vigilante companies were leaving Hell Gate to return to Virginia City, they received word that "Whiskey Bill" Graves was at Fort Owen, Montana. Three vigilantes located and arrested him on January 26, 1864. He was hanged the same day.

=== Known road agents executed by the Vigilance Committee of Alder Gulch ===
- Henry Plummer, sheriff of Bannack, executed in Bannack on January 10, 1864
- Erastus "Red" Yeager, road agent and messenger, executed along the Ruby River, January 4, 1864
- George Brown, road agent and gang secretary, executed along the Ruby River, January 4, 1864
- "Dutch John" Wagner, road agent, executed in Bannack, January 11, 1864
- Ned Ray, executed in Bannack, January 10, 1864
- Buck Stinson, executed in Bannack, January 10, 1864
- "Greaser Joe" Pizanthia, road agent, shot and killed in Bannack, January 11, 1864
- Frank Parish, road agent, executed in Virginia City, January 14, 1864
- Boone Helm, road agent, executed in Virginia City, January 14, 1864
- Jack Gallagher, road agent, executed in Virginia City, January 14, 1864
- George "Clubfoot" Lane, road agent, executed in Virginia City, January 14, 1864
- Hayes Lyon, road agent, executed in Virginia City, January 14, 1864
- Steve Marshland, road agent, executed near the Big Hole River, January 16, 1864
- Bill Bunton, road agent, executed at Cottonwood Ranch on the Clark Fork River, January 18, 1864
- Cyrus Skinner, road agent, executed in Hell Gate, January 24, 1864
- Aleck Carter, road agent, executed in Hell Gate, January 24, 1864
- Johnny Cooper, road agent, executed in Hell Gate, January 24, 1864
- Bob Zachary, road agent, executed in Hell Gate, January 25, 1864
- George Shears, road agent, executed in the Bitterroot Valley, January 25, 1864
- "Whiskey Bill" Graves, road agent, executed near Fort Owen, January 26, 1864
- Bill Hunter, road agent, executed in Gallatin Valley, February 3, 1864

=== Other executions ===
- An unknown 19-year-old boy was hanged on February 17, 1864, in Virginia City for shooting an unarmed man in a tavern.
- Chris Lowrie, Doc Howard, and Jem Romaine were convicted of the Magruder murders by an Idaho Territorial court in Lewiston and hanged on March 4, 1864, based on the testimony of William Page. Page was not executed.
- On March 10, 1864, vigilantes hanged Jack Slade in Virginia City for serious drunken behavior, breaches of the peace and reckless gun play that endangered the communities' citizens.
- James Brady was hanged by vigilantes in Nevada City on June 15, 1864, for shooting another man.
- Jem Kelly was apprehended near present day Jackson, Idaho Territory on the Snake River by Montana vigilantes for a series of petty thefts in Alder Gulch. He was hanged on September 5, 1864, along the Snake River in Idaho Territory.
- On September 17, 1864, vigilantes hanged John "The Hat" Dolan in Virginia City for stealing $700 from a roommate.
- On October 31, 1864, vigilantes captured and hanged J.C. Rawley in Bannack for his alleged spying on behalf of the road agent gang in 1863. This was the last execution performed by the Vigilance Committee of Alder Gulch.

=== Banishments and escapes ===
Another tactic employed by the vigilantes was banishment from the territory. It is unknown how many men were given the warning to leave the territory or suffer execution for their misdeeds. Alexander Toponce, a merchant in Bannack at the time believed the number of banishments was high but wrote this in his autobiography: Reminiscences of Alexander Toponce (1923):

I don't think they [the vigilantes] made any mistake in hanging anybody. The only mistake they made was about fifty percent of those whom they merely banished should have been hung instead, as quite a number of these men were finally hung.

Some of the road agents in Plummer's gang or on Yeager's list were able to escape vigilante justice by fleeing the territory. Notable among these men were Augustus "Gad" Moore, Billy Terwilliger, William Mitchell, Harvey Meade, Richard H. Barter ("Rattlesnake Dick"), "Cherokee Bob", Tex Caldwell, Jeff Perkins, Samuel Bunton, "Irwin of the Big Hole", William Moore and Charles Reeves.

=== Establishment of Territorial Law ===
During the summer of 1864, Hezekiah L. Hosmer, a lawyer from Ohio, was working for the U.S. House of Representative Committee on Territories. After working on the formation of Montana Territory for the committee, he was formally appointed as the first Chief Justice of Montana Territory. He arrived in Montana in October 1864. Prior to the first session of the Territorial Legislature which convened on December 12, 1864, in Bannack, Hosmer announced that he was adopting Common Law as the primary criminal and civil law and Idaho's Territorial Law as a basis for criminal and civil procedure. On December 5, 1864, Hosmer boldly convened a public Grand Jury session in Virginia City and announced that the vigilantes had served their purpose and from this day forward, unilateral actions by the vigilantes would be considered criminal acts.

== Helena vigilantism, 1865–1870 ==
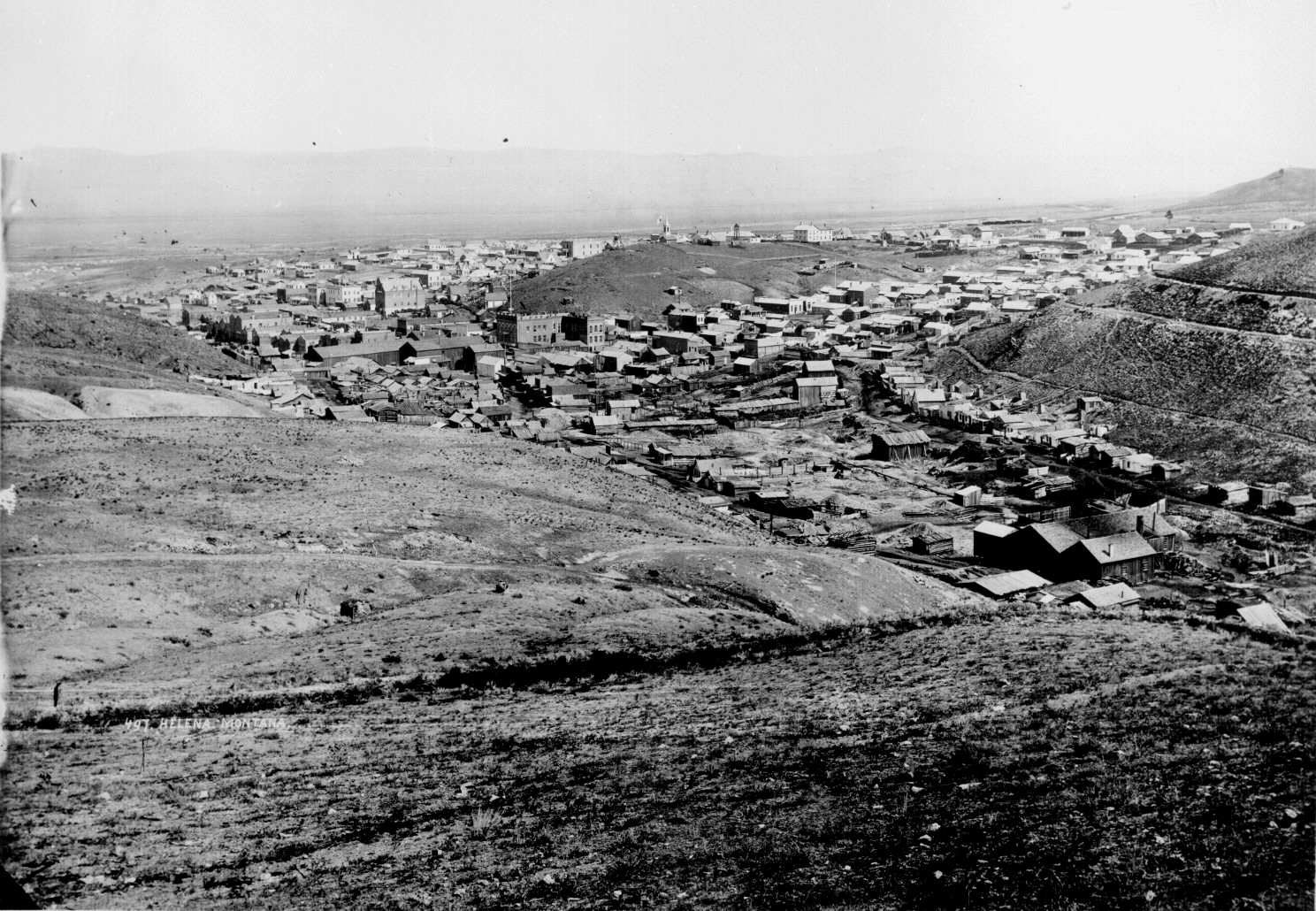
Helena, Montana in 1870

On July 14, 1864, four prospectors - John S. Cowan, John Crab, Bob Staley and Daniel Jackson - found gold in a small creek they named "Last Chance Gulch". As word of the strike spread throughout the area, prospectors and fortune seekers, including many from Alder Gulch and Bannack, migrated to Last Chance Gulch and the town of Helena, Montana was founded. By the middle of 1865, many prominent vigilantes of Alder Gulch, including Wilbur Sanders, John X. Beidler, and Anton Holter, had moved to Helena. When the territory was formed, three judicial districts were established. The First District belonged to Judge Hosmer and included the towns of Bannack, Virginia City, Nevada City and Deer Lodge. The Third District encompassed the towns around Helena. From July 1864, until August 1865, the only justice system was the miners' court; the Third District did not get its first chief judge until August 1865, when Judge Lyman Munson arrived from the east.

On June 8, 1865, John Keene and Harry Slater, two men who had an unresolved quarrel from their days in Salt Lake City, spotted each other in Sam Greer's saloon on Helena's Bridge Street. Keene shot Slater in the head, killing him instantly. Keene surrendered himself to Helena sheriff George Wood and freely admitted his guilt in the shooting. A two-day trial ensued where some members of the jury were known vigilantes from Alder Gulch. Since there was no official trial judge, Stephan Reynolds, a respected member of the Helena community, presided. At the end of the trial, the jury returned a unanimous guilty verdict and Keene was hanged from the lone pine tree just outside town. The large tree, one of few that remained in proximity to Helena because most had been cut down for lumber, became known as the "Old Hangman's Tree". Although Keene's trial and execution was not considered vigilantism, the Helena community, similar to the Alder Gulch community in 1863, felt the need to establish a more reliable means of law and order.

=== Committee of Safety ===
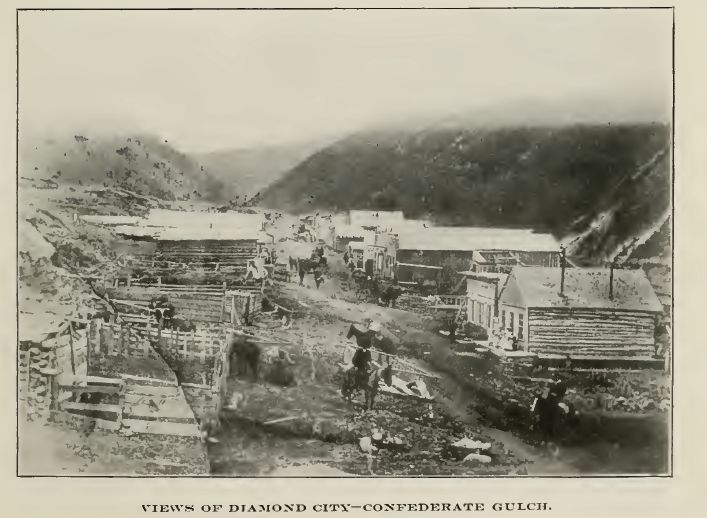
Diamond City in Confederate Gulch, 1870

Vigilante justice in Helena followed a pattern similar to that of Alder Gulch. Immediately after Keene's hanging, leading members of the Helena community established the Helena Committee of Safety, akin to the Vigilance Committee of Alder Gulch. Although no records of the committee's membership or bylaws exist, Nathaniel Langford, who had been asked to lead the organization but declined (he did serve on its executive committee), reflected in his book Vigilante Days and Ways that crimes of horse stealing, murder, and highway robbery would be punishable by death.

In July 1865, the Helena vigilantes captured Jack Silvie in Diamond City, Montana, and charged him with various crimes of robbery. Prior to his execution by hanging from Helena's "Hangman's Tree", Silvie confessed to being a member of the Virginia City road agents and to at least a dozen murders in the territory.

Shortly after Judge Lyman Munson's arrival in Helena, he convened a grand jury on August 12, 1865. However, unlike Judge Hosmer in Alder Gulch, Munson made no remarks about vigilantism nor did he threaten vigilantes with prosecution if they continued their activities. The vigilantes showed little respect for Munson's court and proceeded to carry out at least 14 extrajudicial executions. Among them was that in January 1870 of Chinese worker Ah Chow, who had shot and killed white miner John R. Blitzer after he found Blitzer attempting to rape his wife. No member of Helena's vigilantes was ever indicted by Munson's grand jury for executions carried out by the Helena Committee of Safety. The last execution by the Helena vigilantes occurred on April 27, 1870, when Joseph Wilson and Arthur Compton were hanged from the "Old Hangman's Tree" for the robbery and attempted murder of George Leonard. The double hanging is significant because it was photographed at the time and the image, widely circulated, had the effect of damping public sentiment for vigilantism.

== Pax Vigilanticus ==
By the 1870s Montana as a whole was experiencing what Montana historian Frederic Allen described as a "sort of pax vigilanticus" Allen claims this was due to the reputation for summary executions but also linked to the discovery of gold in the Black Hills of the Dakota Territory. This drew many of the prospectors and camp followers out of Montana, reducing the sector of the population more closely associated with crime.

== Stockmen's associations ==
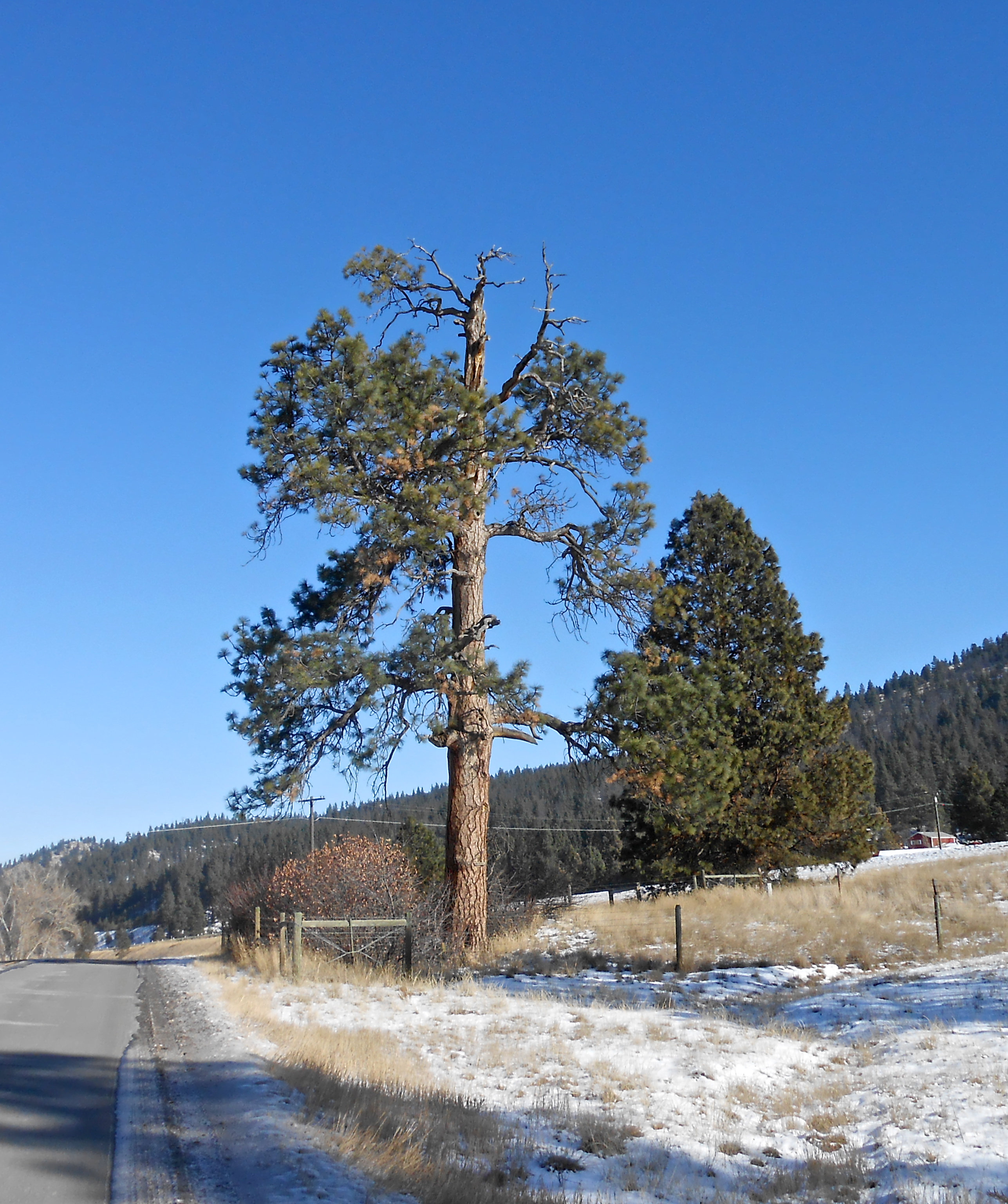
Ponderosa pine alleged to be a "hanging tree" in Jefferson County, Montana, near Clancy, though there is insufficient documentary evidence to prove or disprove this legend.

By the 1870s, cattle ranching and related livestock raising was a large and prosperous business in Montana. Cattle and horses were valuable commodities and always subject to rustling by thieves. After 1879, with the threat from the Indian wars diminished on the plains of Montana, stock ranches and open range cattle ranching moved east into Central and Eastern Montana. The DHS ranch, owned by Samuel Hauser, Andrew Davis and Granville Stuart was established in 1879 in the Musselshell region of Central Montana and became one of the largest open range ranches in Montana.

The first stockmen's association in Montana was formed in Virginia City in 1873. The association was established to discuss branding standards, how to deal with rustling and how to influence the territorial legislature to pass laws favorable to the cattle industry. This association did not survive, but led to the creation of other organizations in subsequent years. In 1878, the Montana Stock Association of Lewis and Clark County was organized. One of its prominent members, Ross Deegan, editorialized about the need for extralegal action if the territorial legislature did not enact laws to protect the cattle industry:

Will [our legislators] give us ... protection, or shall we be compelled against our wishes to become judges and executors of what we deem a proper penalty for the commission of such infringement upon the rights of property?

— Ross Deegan, Helena Weekly Herald, January 9, 1879

In July, 1879, a Territorial Stock Association was formed that ultimately spawned a number of small county or district based associations throughout Montana. By 1883, the value of cattle in Montana was estimated at greater than $25 million and annual losses from rustling exceeded three percent. By the summer of 1884, cattle men resorted to vigilantism to deal with rustlers and the first recorded hanging occurred at Fort Maginnis on July 3, 1884, when Reese Anderson, a DHS ranch foreman, and several other ranch hands hanged Sam McKenzie for horse thievery.

=== Stuart's Stranglers ===
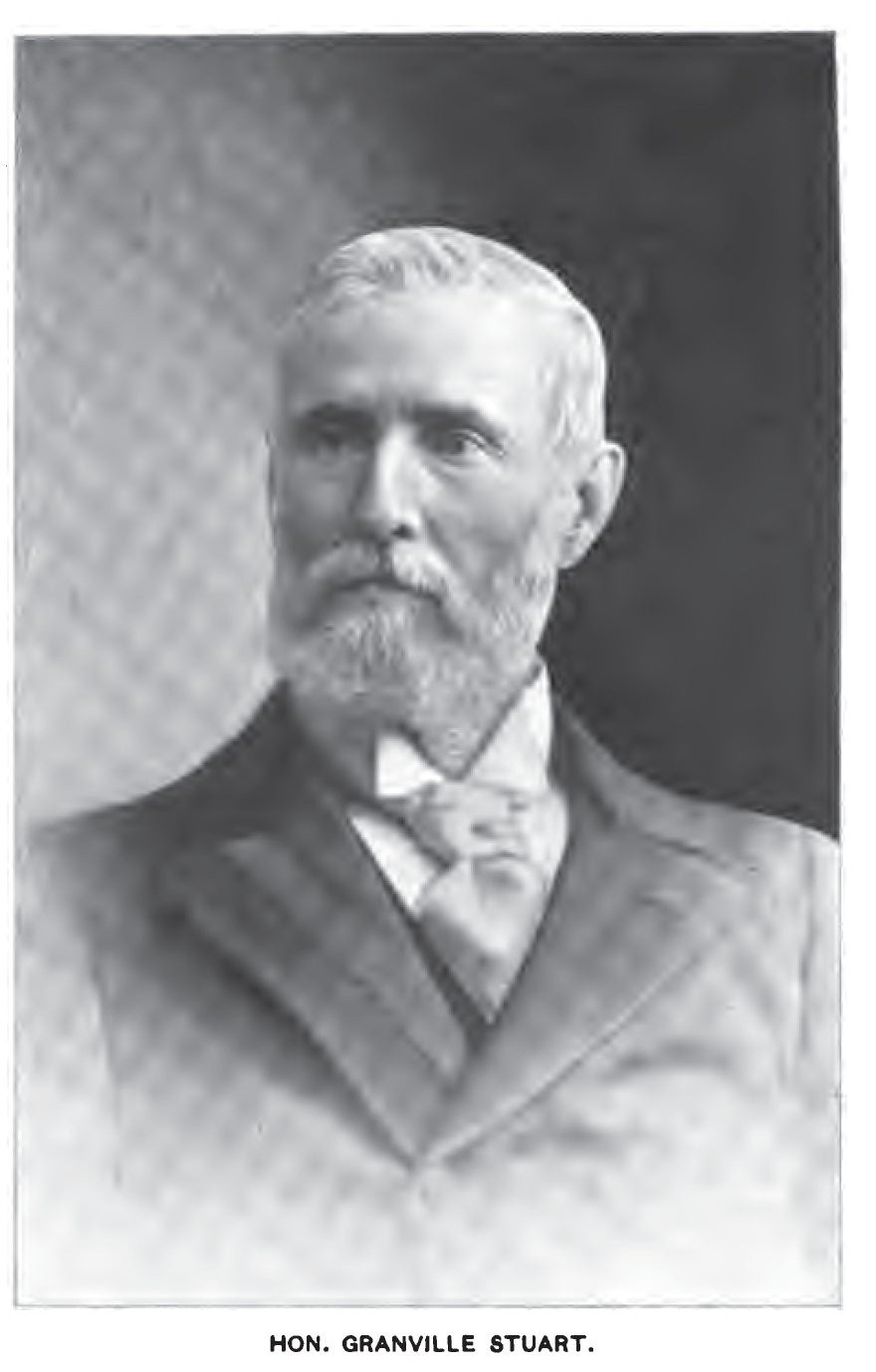
Granville Stuart in 1900

The hanging of Sam McKenzie and other citizen justice in early July 1884 prompted many thieves and rustlers to leave the territory. However, a large band of horse thieves still operated in the Musselshell region. With the tacit approval of the stockgrowers' associations, Granville Stuart organized a small intelligence network and mobilized forces to go after the thieves. The group included many of Stuart's ranch hands and stock detectives employed by various stock associations. Known as "Stuart's Stranglers", the vigilantes were responsible for the recovery of dozens of stolen horses and the deaths of at least 20 thieves in July 1884, by hanging, shootings or fire. The last hanging occurred on August 1, 1884. In July 1884, Theodore Roosevelt who later became the 26th President of the United States, was operating a cattle ranch in Medora, North Dakota along the Little Missouri River in cooperation with cattle merchant Marquis de Mores. His ranch was suffering from rustling as well. Both Mores and Roosevelt offered their services to the Stranglers, but Stuart declined the offer to avoid the undue notoriety they would bring. From that point forward, stock detectives, employed by the various stock associations, took responsibility for enforcing stock laws and deterring rustling. Although there was minor public outrage about the killings, none of Stuart's Stranglers were ever brought to trial for their actions and editorials in regional newspapers praised their efforts. General acclamation of Granville Stuart's actions was reflected by his election as the first president of the Montana Stockgrower's Association in late July 1884.

== 3-7-77 ==
The numerical symbol 3-7-77 has long been associated with Montana vigilantes. Its meaning is unclear though many theories have been put forward trying to explain what it symbolized, none conclusive, including references to the dimensions of a grave, the amount of time a miscreant had to leave town, assorted Masonic symbolism, details of membership structure, and a simple copying of the symbol from organizations in Colorado and California. Although it has been associated with vigilantes in Alder Gulch, this is not supported by historical evidence. The first documented evidence of use of the symbol in a vigilante scenario occurred in November 1879 in Helena when it was mentioned in a newspaper article. A 1914 dissertation noted that it was simply used as part of a meeting notice. It was incorporated into the uniform patch of the Montana Highway Patrol (MHP) in 1956. MHP administrator Alex Stephenson designed the insignia and explained, "we chose the symbol to keep alive the memory of this first people's police force."

== Historiography ==
The first written account of the vigilantes was Thomas Dimsdale's Vigilantes of Montana which first appeared as a series of articles in 1865 editions of the Montana Post, Virginia City's and Montana's first newspaper. Dimsdale was a member of the Alder Gulch Vigilance Committee and editor of the Montana Post. His early accounts of the Alder Gulch vigilante events are widely cited and the book version of his articles, the first book published in Montana Territory in 1866, has been extensively reprinted since its first edition.

The value of Dimsdale's work lies in the fact that the volume at first a series of articles for his own paper, The Montana Post is exactly what it purports to be. Truth than fiction is ever stranger, and no glorified romance of the old west has ever succeeded in echoing like authenticity. What we have in The Vigilantes is the statement of fact before it becomes fiction, the unadorned moment in history before hearsay, the folk imagination, and the teller of tales weaves it into saga.

— Book review, Howard W. Troyer, 1953

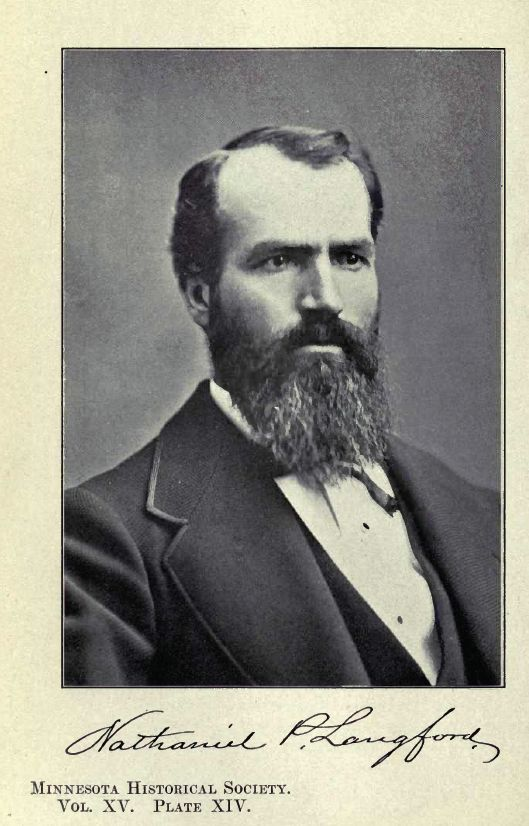
Nathaniel P. Langford in 1870

John X. Beidler, one of the Alder Gulch and Helena vigilante enforcers wrote about his vigilante activities in his personal journals. They weren't available until well after his death when Helen F. Sanders, the daughter-in-law of Wilbur Sanders finally got them published in 1957. Nathaniel Langford, also a member of the vigilantes, explorer of the upper Yellowstone (1870), first superintendent of Yellowstone National Park (1872–1877), territorial tax collector (1864–1869) and author published Vigilante Days and Ways-Pioneers of the Rockies in 1893 after he returned to his home in Minnesota. In a 1912 speech to the Montana Historical Society, western historian, Olin Wheeler provided positive commentary on the Alder Gulch vigilantes in a tribute to the life of Nathaniel Langford.

... Under the domination of the Vigilantes the desperadoes were hung or banished, crime was actually and swiftly punished, life and property were rendered safe, and society was rescued from a state of anarchy. Some of the best citizens in the territory were Vigilantes. ... Mr. Langford himself, happily, in the Introduction to his Vigilante Days and Ways and a most valuable chronicle of the time of which it treats, has presented a statement of facts and of arguments justifying the Vigilante methods, that is impartial, honest, cogent, forceful, and convincing to an open and discriminating mind. Honor and praise, instead of adverse criticism, are due those men, and no apologies are necessary for what they did and dared.

— Olin D. Wheeler, 1912

Another account, not published until 1982, is that of former Montana Supreme Court Justice (1922–1935) Lew L. Callaway. Edited by his son Lew Callaway Jr., Montana's Righteous Hangmen:The Vigilantes in Action stems from Callaway's association with vigilante Captain James William in the late 1800s. Lew Callaway wrote extensively about the vigilantes and his stories which add more intimate details about how the vigilantes operated are captured in this volume. Although some vigilante activities during this period were criticized by citizens and civic leaders, there was a general affirmation of their purpose and contribution to law and order in a growing territory. Mark C. Dillon's Montana Vigilantes 1863–1870 Gold, Guns and Gallows (2013) concludes that given the lawless environment and criminal activity in Alder Gulch and Helena at the time, the lack of any functioning justice system and the understanding of due process at the time, the vigilantes acted in a way they thought was best for their communities. He contends that judging the vigilantes by today's understanding and standards of due process is problematic.

Justice Dillon's book is the first work of its kind that examines western vigilante history through the prism of substantive, procedural, and constitutional law, and the role that lawyers and judges ultimately played in restoring a credible system of criminal justice to the region by the end of the decade. ... Universities only publish books that survive rigorous peer reviews. Historian Paul R. Wylie, who was among the historians that reviewed Dillon's manuscript, predicts that the book "will be the best work on the Montana Vigilantes, and will likely be around for years to come." Wylie describes the book as having a "careful, informative, judicial approach [that is] well-written and very readable," and that to his knowledge, "there has never been a work in the area quite like this."

— Book Announcement Rockland County Bar Association (2012)

In 2004, Frederick Allen, a journalist and historian, published A Decent and Orderly Lynching:The Montana Vigilantes reviewed as an up-to-day balanced account of Montana's vigilante history (1864–1870). Allen's book reinforces the motivations and methods of the earliest vigilantes in Alder Gulch while commenting on the growing disdain for vigilantism in the late 1860s. More generalist works on Montana history such as Merrill G. Burlingame's The Montana Frontier (1942) and Michael P. Malone's Montana-A History of Two Centuries (1991) adequately summarize the vigilante period largely based on earlier accounts by Dimsdale, Langford and Beidler. Additionally, many topical histories of Montana, such as novelist and Montana historian Dan Cushman's Montana: The Gold Frontier (1973), cover the vigilante period.

Some works published in the late 20th century about vigilante activity in Alder Gulch portray the vigilantes and their leaders as conspirators with political motives rather than restoring law and order, making an argument that victims were not afforded due process prior to their execution and evidence was insufficient to prove their guilt or innocence. Two works, of Ruth E. Mather and F. E. Boswell, Hanging the Sheriff-A Biography of Henry Plummer (1987, 1999) and Vigilante Victims: Montana's 1864 Hanging Spree (1991) have been criticized as revisionist, and received poor reviews by Montana historians such as Michael P. Malone and Richard B. Roeder. Additional criticism came from later authors such as Mark C. Dillon and Carol Buchanan.

Mather, R. E.; Boswell, F. E. (1987). Hanging the Sheriff-A Biography of Henry Plummer. Salt Lake City: University of Utah Press. ISBN 0-9663355-0-3.

In Hanging the Sheriff, R. E. Mather and F. E. Boswell have radically redrawn the portrait of Sheriff Henry Plummer and effectively challenged the conventional justification of the Montana vigilantes of 1863–64. The authors reject the vigilante defenders assertion that Plummer's reign of terror necessitated the formation of a vigilance committee to bring law and order to the area. First, law had been established at Bannack through the miners' court, Plummer's election, and the arrival of Judge Edgerton in September 1863. Second, Plummer's alleged leadership of the road agents was based on an unsubstantiated and unexamined accusation.

— Review, Frank Grant, Western Historical Quarterly, 1988

Mather, R. E.; F. E. Boswell (1991). Vigilante Victims: Montana's 1864 Hanging Spree. San Jose, CA: History West Publishing.

This is a "revisionist" history of the Vigilante movement that claims the road agents were victims of a plot perpetrated in a struggle for power between two factions, one favoring the North and the other favoring the South. It overlooks the cooperation between Pfouts, a strong Confederate, and Sanders, a Union abolitionist, in the leadership of the Vigilantes, and that Jack Gallagher was a Union sympathizer, while Boone Helm died shouting, "Hoorah for Jeff Davis!"

— Carol Buchanan, Swan Range, the writings of Carol Buchanan (2012)

Another account from John C. Fazio, who writes for the Cleveland Civil War Roundtable, contends that the Vigilance Committee of Alder Gulch had more to do with national politics than with dealing with criminals. He contends that Sidney Edgerton and Wilbur Sanders were pawns of Abraham Lincoln and other unionists who sought ways to rid Montana gold fields of southerners and confederate sympathizers. His views have been rebutted by novelist Carol Buchanan.

=== Mock trial of Henry Plummer and Plummer's pardon request ===
On May 7, 1993, the Twin Bridges, Montana public schools organized a mock trial of Henry Plummer at the Madison County courthouse in Virginia City. The trial received national media attention. Adults and students role played events using the accounts of Dimsdale, X. Beidler and Langford. After a six hour trial, the jury of four men and eight women was in deadlock, 6-6. The student playing the role of Henry Plummer was told he was "free". Based in part on the notoriety of the mock trial, academics sympathetic to the view that Plummer was innocent, petitioned the Montana Board of Pardons and Parole to grant Plummer a pardon. Although supported by a number of prominent historians and scholars, the pardon was denied by the board as Plummer had never actually been convicted of a crime in Montana and therefore the board was without jurisdiction to act.

== In popular culture ==
- Ernest Haycox's 1942 novel Alder Gulch depicts Bannack Sheriff Henry Plummer as a cold and calculating murderer and thief.
- John Dehner played Henry Plummer in an episode of the 1950s western television series, Stories of the Century, starring and narrated by Jim Davis.
- Montana Territory is a 1952 Western film starring Wanda Hendrix, Clayton Moore, Hugh Sanders and Lon McCallister. It is a classic western movie, with bandits, a corrupt sheriff [Plummer] and a hero who falls for a beautiful woman.
- An episode of the TV series Overland Trail, The Montana Vigilantes aired in April 1960.
- In "Two for the Gallows" (April 11, 1961) of NBC's Laramie, series character Slim Sherman (John Smith) is hired under false pretenses to take a "Professor Landfield", played by Donald Woods, into the Badlands to seek gold. Landfield, however, is really Morgan Bennett, a member of the former Plummer gang who has escaped from prison.
- The Missouri Breaks is a 1976 American western action film starring Marlon Brando and Jack Nicholson that portrays rustling and retribution in 1880s eastern Montana.
- Little, Michael Edward (2010). Twelve Quiet Men: The Story of the Cowboy Vigilantes Known as Stuart's Stranglers at War with the Outlaws of Montana and Dakota in 1884. Inkwater Press. ISBN 978-1-59299-548-6.—an historical fiction novel.
- Scottish folk act, The David Latto Band, wrote a song about the story of Henry Plummer called 'Plummer's Song' released on their 2012 eponymous debut album. The song was written from the viewpoint of a member of the Bannack community who had reservation about Plummer's alleged crimes.

== Dimsdale, Thomas J. (1915). The Vigilantes of Montana-or Popular Justice in the Rocky Mountains. Helena, Montana: State Publishing. (1st published in 1866) ==
- Langford, Nathaniel Pitt (1893). Vigilante Days and Ways-The Pioneers of the Rockies (PDF). New York: D. D. Merrill.
- Beidler, John Xavier (1957). Helen F. Sanders; William H. Bertsche Jr. (eds.). X. Beidler Vigilante. Norman, Oklahoma: University of Oklahoma Press.
- Callaway, Lew L. (1997). Montana's Righteous Hangmen-The Vigilantes in Action. Norman, Okla.: University of Oklahoma Press. ISBN 978-0-8061-2912-9.
- Allen, Frederick (2005). Decent, Orderly Lynching: The Montana Vigilantes. Norman, Okla.: University of Oklahoma Press. ISBN 0-8061-3651-0.
- Donovan, Tom D. (2007). Hanging Around the Big Sky: The Unofficial Guide to Lynching, Strangling and Legal Hangings of Montana. Portage Meadows Publishing. ISBN 978-0-9769718-1-8.
- Milner, Clyde A. II; O'Conner, Carol A. (2008). "Stranglers". As Big As The West-The Pioneer Life of Granville Stuart. New York: Oxford University Press. pp. 219–248. ISBN 978-0-19-512709-6. Comprehensive account of "Stuart's Stranglers" (1884)
- Dillon, Mark C. (2013). Montana Vigilantes 1863–1870 Gold, Guns and Gallows. Logan, Utah: Utah State University Press. ISBN 978-0-87421-919-7.
- Robison, Ken (2013). Montana Territory and the Civil War: A Frontier Forged on the Battlefield. Charleston, SC: The History Press. ISBN 978-1-62619-175-4.
- Crosley, Donald E. (2013). Hang 'Em: Montana Vigilantes Vs. Henry Plummer. Self published.
- Egan, Ken Jr. (2014). Montana 1864-Indians, Emigrants and Gold in the Territorial Year. Helena, Montana: Riverbend Publishing. ISBN 978-1-60639-076-4.
