= Clubfoot George =

19th-century American criminal

George Lane, better known as Clubfoot George, was an alleged outlaw who was hanged on January 14, 1864, in Nevada City, Montana. Lane was later alleged to have been a member of a criminal gang known as the Gang of Innocents and sentenced to death. The execution was carried out by the Montana Vigilantes, a committee which functioned during Montana's gold rush in 1863 and 1864.

== Early life and journey west ==
Lane was born in Massachusetts and suffered from a congenital deformity in his foot. He was a laborer who traveled to the Western United States to find work. Lane then worked several jobs in California, Idaho, and Montana but was haunted by persistent allegations that he was a horse thief.

Sometime between 1848 and 1855, during the California Gold Rush, Lane moved west. This was then a common practice among adventurous men. While in California he worked at a farm in Yuba County and later as a store clerk in Calaveras County.

In 1860, Lane moved to Washington Territory following the path of gold miners. Two years later he was accused of "running off horses" in Idaho and turned himself in to the commander of Fort Lapwai. He was sentenced to do construction work. The next year he was accused of stealing horses again, but escaped the town before he was caught. Lane then moved to Virginia City, Montana, another common destination for gold miners.

== Virginia City ==
Lane came to Virginia City in the fall of 1863, the same year that the Montana Vigilantes Committee was formed. In Virginia City, Lane became a bootmaker working for Dance and Stuart's Store. His employers respected him as a hard worker.

In December 1863, a member of the Innocents gang, George Ives, was subjected to a vigilante trial in Nevada City, Montana. Lane rode to Bannack, Montana in order to inform Bannack sheriff Henry Plummer of the trial. Lane's aim was to convince Plummer that he should request a civilian trial for George Ives. After he learned that Plummer was absent, Lane spoke with two of Plummer's deputies. He complained to them of the common vigilantism in Virginia City. His sentiments were seen as suspicious by the deputies, who soon had Lane arrested. He was told that he was arrested because he was "a road agent, thief, and an accessory to numerous robberies and murders on the highway". He did not resist arrest, but told them that "If you hang me, you will hang an innocent man."

Though some local residents believed that Lane was innocent, the members of the Vigilantes Committee still found him guilty and sentenced him to death by hanging. Shortly before the execution, Lane appealed to his employer to confirm his innocence. Dance responded that although Lane was always honest in dealings at work, he had no knowledge of George's other activities. Dance also admitted that the evidence against Lane was rather strong. Lane asked for no more help, but he said, "Well, then, will you pray with me?" Dance agreed: "Willingly, George; most willingly," and, according to biographer Langford, "suiting the action to the word, the judge dropped upon his knees, and, with George and Gallagher kneeling beside him, offered up a fervent petition in behalf of the doomed men."

Lane was then led out of the building to the gallows. He saw a friend of his who came to see the execution and said to him, "Good-bye, old fellow. I'm gone". Lane then took action, and witnesses reported that "without waiting for the box to be removed, he leaped from it, and died with hardly a struggle".

One witness to the execution said that "He was perfectly cool and collected... He evidently thought no more of hanging than the ordinary man would of eating his breakfast."

Sheriff-outlaw Henry Plummer and his deputies, Buck Stinson and Ned Ray, also alleged members of the gang, were already arrested before on the morning of January 10, 1864 and summarily hanged.

== Burial and exhumation ==
Lane was buried in an unmarked grave in Boot Hill cemetery along with other executed men. In 1907, some residents of Virginia City started questioning who was buried in each grave in the cemetery. A former vigilante showed questioners where exactly Lane was buried. The body was exhumed and his mummified club foot was found. For some time the club foot was kept in the courthouse, but later it was moved to the Thompson Hickman Museum in Virginia City. It has since become one of the museum's most important exhibits. The club foot was later removed from the museum by Lane's extended family. It was cremated and the ashes were spread at a ceremony on Boot Hill on June 24, 2017.

== See also ==
- List of people from Massachusetts
- List of people from Montana
