= Alder Gulch =

Montana gold rush discovery

Coordinates: 45°19′31″N 112°04′38″W

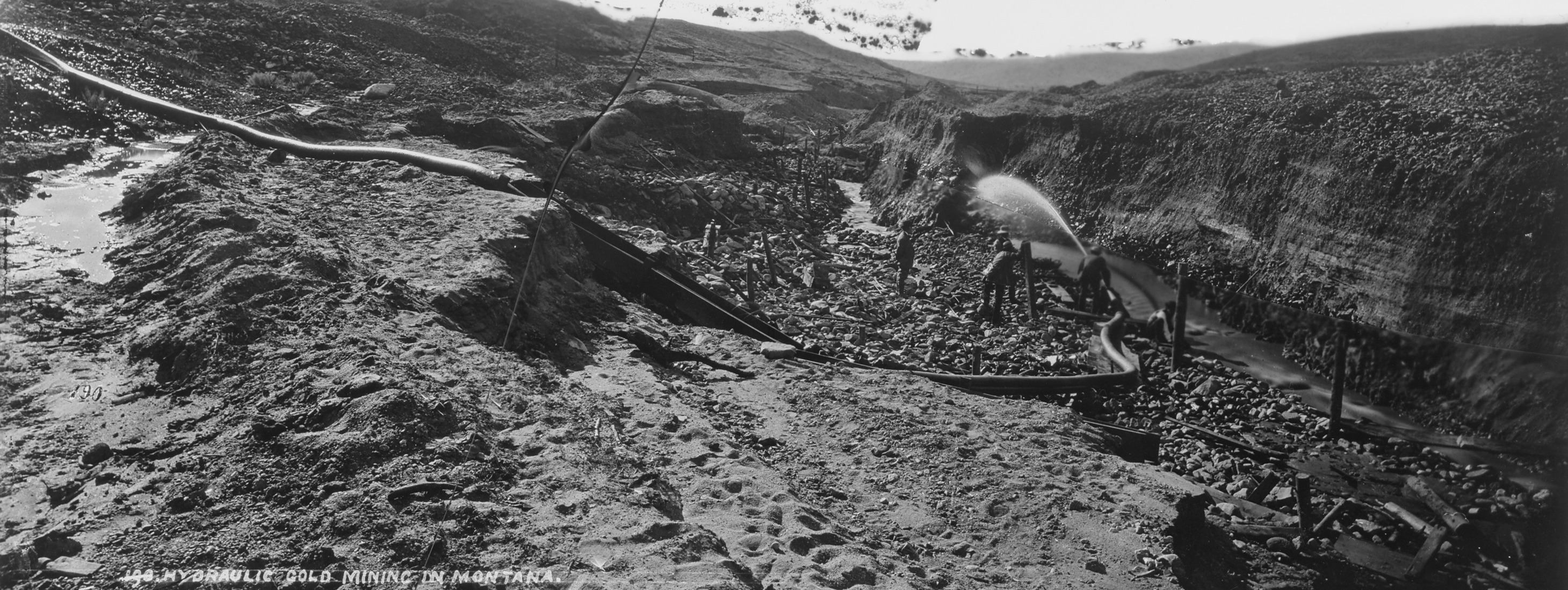
Hydraulic gold mining in Alder Gulch, 1871. Photo by William Henry Jackson.

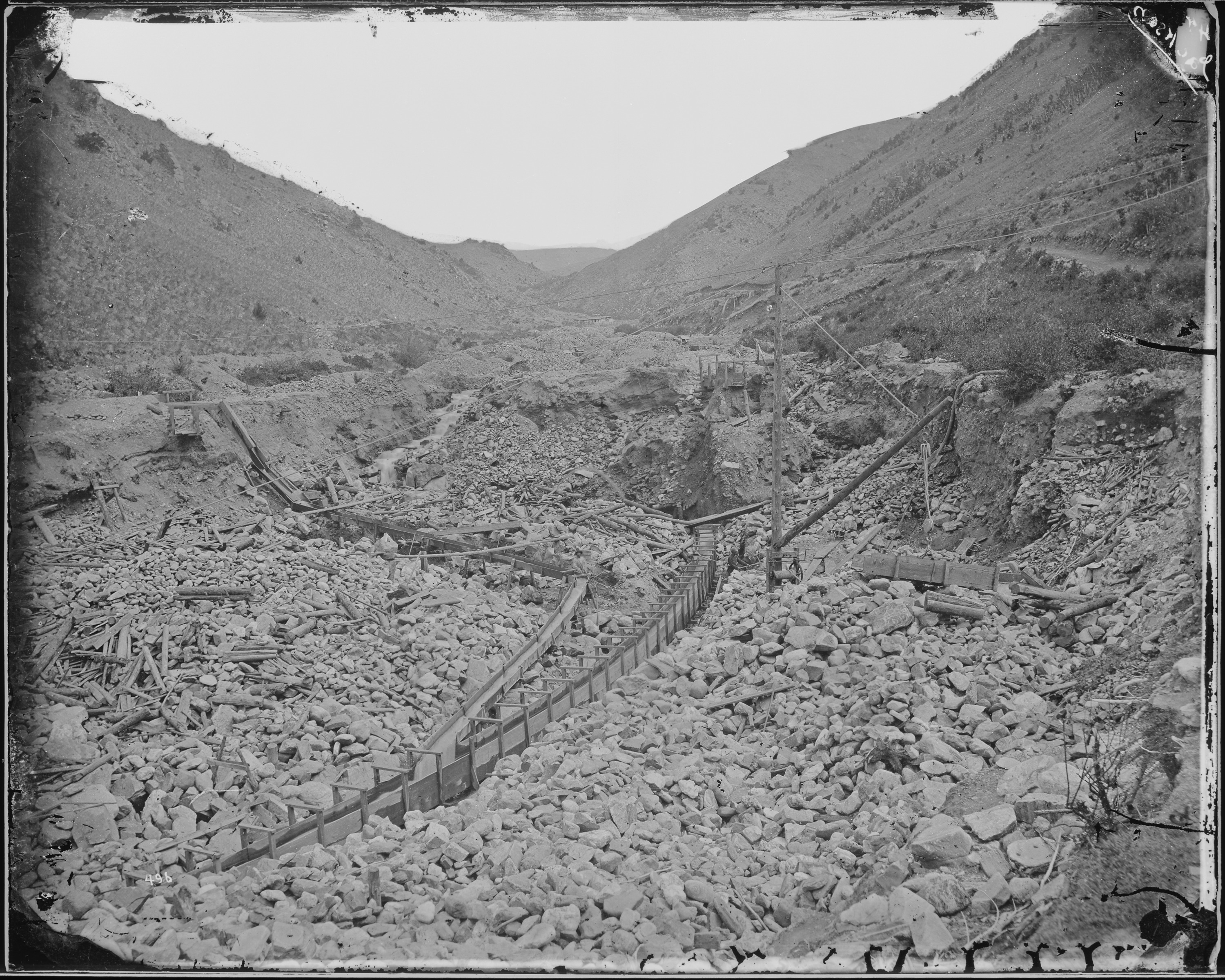
Placer mining in Alder Gulch, 1872

Alder Gulch (alternatively called Alder Creek) is a place in the Ruby River valley, in the U.S. state of Montana, where gold was discovered on May 26, 1863, by William Fairweather and a group of men including Barney Hughes, Thomas Cover, Henry Rodgers, Henry Edgar and Bill Sweeney who were returning to the gold fields of Grasshopper Creek, Bannack, Montana. They were on their way to Yellowstone Country from Bannack but were waylaid by a band of Crow Indians. After being ordered out of Crow hunting grounds, they crossed the East Slope of the Tobacco Root Mountains and camped for the night in Elk Park, where William "Bill" Fairweather and Henry Edgar discovered gold, while the remaining party was out hunting for meat. Agreeing to keep the new discovery quiet the group of miners returned to the town of Bannack for supplies. However, word leaked out about the new strike, and miners followed the Fairweather party out of town. The party stopped at the Point of Rocks, part way between Bannack and Alder Gulch, and established the Fairweather Mining District in a miners meeting. It was agreed that the discoverers were entitled to two claims and first choice. The first stampede of miners reached Alder Gulch June 6, 1863, and the population swelled to over 10,000 in less than 3 months. The "Fourteen Mile City" ran the length of the gulch, and included the towns of Junction City, Adobe Town, Nevada City, Central City, Virginia City, Montana, Bear Town, Highland, Pine Grove French Town, Hungry Hollow, and Summit. Upon arrival the miners lived in brush wickiups, dugouts and under overhanging rocks until cabins could be built. The first structure built in Virginia City was the Mechanical Bakery. Virginia City, and Nevada City were the centers of commerce during the height of the Alder Gulch gold rush. In the first year the area had over 10,000 people living there. Montana Territory was established in May 1864, and the first territorial capital was Bannack. The capital then moved to Virginia City, where it remained until 1875. The Alder Gulch diggings were the richest gold placer deposits ever discovered, and in three years $30,000,000 was taken from them, with $10,000,000 taken out in the first year. Nowadays, except during summertime, the streets of Virginia City are usually quiet and relatively few visitors find their way to the 16 ton granite monument that marks the spot of that incredible discovery of May 26, 1863.

Alder Gulch is named for the alder bushes that grew along the creek.

== Sources ==
- Dictionary of American History 11 by James Truslow Adams, New York: Charles Scribner's Sons, 1940
