= Innocents (gang) =

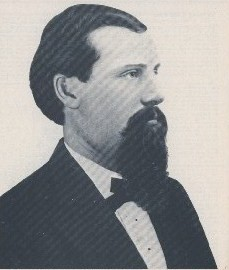
- Portrait of Sheriff Henry Plummer, who was discovered to be the leader of the Innocents
- Founded: 1863
- Founded by: Henry Plummer
- Founding location: Virginia City, Montana, Idaho Territory
- Years active: 1863–1864
- Territory: western Montana
- Ethnicity: European-American
- Membership (est.): over 20
- Criminal activities: road agents, stagecoach robbery, highway robbery

The Innocents were an alleged gang of outlaw road agents in Montana Territory who operated during the gold rush of the 1860s, preying on shipments and travelers carrying gold from Virginia City, Montana. According to the early chronicler Thomas Dimsdale, the gang attempted to steal gold while it was being transported; they killed many travelers who resisted. Sheriff Henry Plummer of Bannack, Montana was accused of leading the group, and was executed by a group of vigilantes from Virginia City in January 1864, along with several other alleged gang members.

== Criminal activities ==
Early historians, originating with Dimsdale, stated that the gang consisted of over one hundred members at its height. Their headquarters was supposedly based at the Rattlesnake Ranch, twelve miles outside of Virginia City, Montana. The gang allegedly killed over one hundred people (only eight deaths have been confirmed by documented sources) and stole a significant amount of gold while it was being transported the seventy-mile distance between Virginia City and Bannack.

Researchers believed the gang operated in small units in order to prey upon travelers from different towns. The gang was said to place watchmen in mine offices and gambling offices to determine when gold would be shipped. The members of the gang were believed to use secret code words for identification, as well as a secret knot in their ties. Many residents soon became frustrated by the rate of robberies and murders. In late 1863 they formed a committee of vigilantes (the Montana Vigilantes) to combat the rash of murders and robberies.

== Vigilante justice ==
Plummer was initially suspected of criminal activity after two residents who had been robbed claimed that they had recognized him during the robberies. Another local robbing victim said that, after he confronted Sheriff Plummer about the danger of the roads, Plummer offered to return some of his money to him. The vigilante committee arrested three men in Nevada City in December 1863, charging them with murder. One man was executed, and the group banished the other two.

After learning of this event, boot-maker George Lane rode to Bannack to tell Plummer about the incident. For the next month, the vigilante committee arrested many local men suspected of being part of Plummer's gang. They passed sentences ranging from execution to flogging to banishment. Shortly before one man was hanged, he told the assembled crowd that Plummer was the ringleader behind the recent crime spree.

This confirmed the suspicions held by the vigilantes, and they soon arrested Plummer. After being arrested, he tried to bribe his captors but was unsuccessful. Between December 1863 and February 1864 the vigilante committee executed Plummer and twenty-two alleged members of his gang, including George Lane. At one point the vigilantes assembled a force of over 500 men and sealed off Virginia City in order to catch gang members. The gallows on which Plummer was hanged had been built at his request as sheriff in relation to an earlier case. Over 5,000 people assembled to watch the hangings of the gang members.

== Modern scholarship ==
Scholars have noted a lack of documentation and other historical evidence pertaining to the Innocents. The earliest accounts of the gang have been shown to be unreliable. The descriptions of activities and secret codes conform to a common pattern of frontier mythography. (The number of members was "over a hundred," the number of victims also "over a hundred," their secret password was "I am innocent"). Frederick Allen and other modern scholars have questioned whether the gang was as influential as told. Mather and Boswell are among scholars who deny that any gang conducted the relatively few documented robberies in the area, saying they were more likely the work of a small number of independent (or at most loosely organized) outlaws.
