= Henry Plummer =

American prospector, lawman, and outlaw (1832–1864)

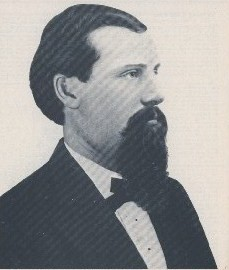
- Henry Plummer before 1864
- Born: c. 1832; Addison, Maine, U.S.
- Died: January 10, 1864; Bannack, Idaho Territory, U.S.
- Cause of death: Lynching
- Other name: William Henry Handy Plumer
- Occupations: prospector, city marshal, sheriff, outlaw, road agent, criminal gang leader
- Known for: Leader of "Road Agent" gang, the "Innocents"

Henry Plummer (c. 1832 – January 10, 1864) was a prospector, lawman, and outlaw in the American West in the 1850s and 1860s, who was known to have killed several men. He was elected sheriff of what was then Bannack, Idaho Territory, in 1863 and served until 1864, during which period he was accused of being the leader of a "road agent" gang of outlaws known as the "Innocents," who preyed on shipments from what was then Virginia City, Idaho Territory to other areas. In response some leaders in Virginia City formed the Vigilance Committee of Alder Gulch and began to take action against Plummer's gang, gaining confessions from a couple of men they arrested in early January 1864. On January 10, 1864, Plummer and two associates were arrested in Bannack by a company of the vigilantes and summarily hanged. Plummer was given a posthumous mock trial in 1993 which led to a mistrial. The jury was split 6–6.

== Early years ==
Plummer was born William Henry Handy Plumer in about 1832 in Addison, Maine, the last of six children in a family whose ancestors had first settled in Maine in 1634, when it was still a part of the Massachusetts Bay Colony. His father died while Henry was in his teens. In 1852, at age 19, Plummer headed west to the gold fields of California. He changed the spelling of his surname to Plummer after moving west. His mining venture went well: within two years he owned a mine, a ranch, and a bakery in Nevada City. In 1856, Plummer was elected sheriff and city manager. Supporters suggested that he should run for state representative as a Democrat. However, the party was divided, and without its full support, he lost.

== Becoming an outlaw ==
On September 26, 1857, Plummer shot and killed John Vedder. As city marshal of Nevada City, California, Plummer had been providing protection of Lucy Vedder, John's wife, who was seeking to escape from her abusive husband. Plummer claimed he was acting in self-defense in the incident, but was convicted of second degree murder. He won an appeal for a retrial and was convicted again and sentenced to ten years in San Quentin. But in August 1859, supporters wrote to the governor seeking a pardon based on his alleged good character and civic performance. The governor granted the pardon because of Plummer's poor health as a result of tuberculosis, which was incurable at the time.

In 1861, Plummer tried to carry out a citizen's arrest of William Riley, who had escaped from San Quentin; in the attempt, Riley was killed. Plummer turned himself in to the police, who accepted that the killing was justified. Fearing that his prison record would prevent a fair trial, they allowed Plummer to leave the state.

== Life of a criminal ==
Plummer headed to Washington Territory where gold had been discovered. There he became involved in a dispute that ended in a gunfight won by Plummer. He decided to leave the West and return to Maine.

On the way back east, waiting for a steamboat to reach Fort Benton, Montana, on the Missouri River, Plummer was approached by James Vail. He was recruiting volunteers to help protect his family from Indian attacks at the mission station he was attempting to start in Sun River, Montana. No passage home being available, Plummer accepted, along with Jack Cleveland, a horse dealer who had known Plummer in California.

While at the mission, both Plummer and Cleveland fell in love with Vail's attractive sister-in-law, Electa Bryan; Plummer asked her to marry him and she agreed. As gold had recently been discovered in nearby Bannack, Montana, Plummer decided to go there to try to earn enough money to support them both. Cleveland followed him. In January 1863, Cleveland, nursing his jealousy, forced Plummer into a fight and was killed. The altercation took place in a crowded saloon, and observers agreed that Plummer had killed his foe in self-defense. Plummer was viewed very favorably by most town residents, and in May he was elected sheriff of Bannack.

== The Vigilantes ==
Between October and December 1863, the rate of robberies and murders in and around Alder Gulch increased significantly, and the citizens of Virginia City grew increasingly suspicious of Plummer and his associates. Notable criminal acts by alleged members of the Plummer gang included:

- On October 13, 1863, Lloyd Magruder was killed by road agent Chris Lowrie. Magruder was an Idaho merchant leaving Virginia City with $12,000 in gold dust from goods he had sold there. Several of the men he hired to accompany him back to Lewiston, Idaho, were criminals. Four other men in his party were also murdered in camp—Charlie Allen, Robert Chalmers, Horace Chalmers and William Phillips—by Lowrie, Doc Howard, Jem Romaine and William Page.
- On October 26, 1863, the Peabody and Caldwell's stage was robbed between the Rattlesnake Ranch and Bannack by two road agents believed to be Frank Parish and George Ives. Bill Bunton, the owner of the Rattlesnake Ranch who joined the stage at the ranch, was also complicit in the robbery. The road agents netted $2,800 in gold from the passengers and threatened them all with death if they talked about the robbery.
- On November 13, 1863, a teenaged Henry Tilden was hired by Wilbur Sanders and Sidney Edgerton to locate and corral some horses owned by the two men. Near Horse Prairie, Tilden was confronted by three armed road agents. He was carrying very little money and was allowed to depart unmolested, but was warned that if he talked about whom he had seen, he would be killed. He told Hattie Sanders, Wilbur's wife, and Sidney Edgerton that he had recognized one of the road agents as Sheriff Henry Plummer. Although Tilden's account was dismissed because of general respect for Plummer, suspicion in the region increased that Plummer was the leader of a gang of road agents.
- On November 22, 1863, the A.J. Oliver stage was robbed on its way from Virginia City to Bannack by road agents George Ives, "Whiskey Bill" Graves, and Bob Zachary. The robbery netted less than $1,000 in gold and treasury notes. One of the victims, Leroy Southmayd, reported the robbery and identified the road agents to Sheriff Plummer. Members of Plummer's gang confronted Southmayd on his return trip to Virginia City, but Southmayd was cunning enough to avoid injury or death.
- In November 1863, Conrad Kohrs traveled to Bannack from Deer Lodge, Montana, with $5,000 in gold dust to buy cattle. After talking with Sheriff Plummer in Bannack, Kohrs worried about the risk of robbery on his return to Deer Lodge. While his group was camped overnight, his associates found road agents George Ives and "Dutch John" Wagner surveying the camp and armed with shotguns. A day or two later, Kohrs was riding on horseback to Deer Lodge when Ives and Wagner gave chase. As Kohrs's horse proved the faster, Kohrs evaded confrontation and reached the safety of Deer Lodge.
- In early December 1863, a three-wagon freight outfit organized by Milton S. Moody was going from Virginia City to Salt Lake City. Among the seven passengers was John Bozeman. It was carrying $80,000 in gold dust and $1,500 in treasury notes. While the outfit was camped on Blacktail Deer Creek, Wagner and Steve Marshland entered the camp, armed and ready to rob the pack train. Members of the camp had armed themselves well, and Wagner and Marshland were able to escape by claiming they were just looking for lost horses. Two days later, Wagner and Marshland were both wounded in an unsuccessful attempt to rob the train as it crossed the Continental Divide at Rock Creek.
- On December 8, 1863, Anton Holter, who was taking oxen to sell in Virginia City, survived an attempted robbery and murder. When Ives and Aleck Carter, whom Holter recognized, discovered Holter was not carrying any significant wealth, they tried to shoot him. He avoided being shot and escaped into the brush.

At the time Bannack and Virginia City were part of a remote region of the Idaho Territory; there was no formal law enforcement or justice system for the area. Some residents suspected that Plummer's road agent gang was responsible for numerous robberies, attempted robberies, murders and attempted murders in and around Alder Gulch in October–December 1863. From December 19 to 21, 1863, a public trial was held in Virginia City by a miners' court for Ives, the suspected murderer of Nicholas Tiebolt, a young Dutch immigrant. Hundreds of miners from around the area attended the three-day outdoor trial. George Ives was prosecuted by Wilbur F. Sanders, convicted, and hanged on December 21, 1863.

On December 23, 1863, two days after the Ives trial, leading citizens of Virginia City and Bannack formed the Vigilance Committee of Alder Gulch in Virginia City. They included five Virginia City residents, led by Sanders. Between January 4 and February 3, 1864, the vigilantes arrested and summarily executed at least 20 alleged members of Plummer's gang. Shortly after its formation, the Vigilance Committee dispatched a posse of men to search for Carter, Graves, and Bunton, known associates of Ives. The posse was led by Captain James Williams, the man who had investigated the Tiebolt murder. Near the Rattlesnake Ranch on the Ruby River, the posse located Erastus "Red" Yeager and George Brown, both suspected road agents. While traveling under guard back to Virginia City, Yeager made a complete confession, naming the majority of the road agents in Plummer's gang, and Henry Plummer. The posse found Yeager and Brown guilty and hanged them from a tree on the Lorrain's Ranch on the Ruby River.

On January 6, 1864, vigilante Captain Nick Wall and Ben Peabody captured Wagner on the Salt Lake City trail. The vigilantes transported Wagner to Bannack, where he was hanged on January 11, 1864. By this time, Yeager's confession had mobilized vigilantes against Plummer and his key associates, deputies Buck Stinson and Ned Ray. Plummer, Stinson, and Ray were arrested on the morning of January 10, 1864, and summarily hanged. The two youngest members of the gang were said to be spared. One was sent back to Bannack to tell the rest to get out of the area, and the other was sent ahead to Lewiston to warn gang members to leave that town. (Lewiston was the connection from the territory to the world, as it had river steamboats that traveled to the coast at Astoria, Oregon, via the Snake and Columbia rivers.) Plummer was known to have traveled to Lewiston during the time when he was an elected official in Bannack. The hotel registry records with his signature during this period have been preserved. The large-scale robberies of gold shipments by gangs ended with Plummer's and the alleged gang members' deaths. Gang member Clubfoot George was hanged at about the same time with Plummer.

== Posthumous trial ==
Plummer was given a posthumous trial in 1993 which led to a mistrial. The jury was split 6–6.

On May 7, 1993, a posthumous trial (Montana’s Twin Bridges Public Schools initiated the event) was held in the Virginia City, Mont., courthouse. The 12 registered voters on the jury were split 6-6 on the verdict, which led Judge Barbara Brook to declare a mistrial. Had Plummer been alive he would have been freed and not tried again.

== In popular culture ==
- Francis M. Thompson's 1914 article in The Massachusetts Magazine (Vol. VI, No. 4 - pages 159-190) describes his relationship with Plummer and presents some of the details of the case, from a personal view of being a mercantile owner in Bannack during that period. In 2004, the Montana Historical Society gathered Thompson's memoirs into a book, A Tenderfoot in Montana.
- Ernest Haycox's 1942 historical novel Alder Gulch depicts Plummer as handsome and well-spoken, but a cold and calculating murderer and thief without conscience. He portrays the vigilantes as justified but equally remorseless, as they conducted their lynching executions by slow strangulation hangings.
- Il passato di Carson [The Past of Carson], a storyline in the Italian comics series "Tex" (nos. 407 to 409, September to November, 1994), is loosely based upon the real story of the "Innocents" and features a character, Raymond Clemmons, inspired by Plummer.
- Henry Plummer appears in a fictional portrayal in the 2013 video game, Call of Juarez: Gunslinger. The game depicts him radically different to his real-life counterpart, as still being alive sometime after 1881, according to the protagonist, and is appropriately depicted as an older man. Though unlike other historical discrepancies mentioned by characters in the game, this is never touched upon.
