= Montana Ghost Town Preservation Society =

American historic preservation non-profit organization

The Montana Ghost Town Preservation Society, founded in 1969 by then-professor of architectural history at Montana State University John N. Dehaas Jr., is a non-profit organization dedicated to educating the public to the benefits of preserving historic buildings, sites, and artifacts that make up the living history of Montana.
