= Miners' court =

Quasi-judicial court in the American Old West

A miners' court was a type of quasi-judicial court common in the American Old West that summoned a subset of the miners in a district when a dispute arose.

== Background ==
It was made to retain order and decide punishments within mining communities. A presiding officer or judge was elected and a jury was selected. Other systems that were used included alcaldes and arbitration. In the event a decision was disputed, a mass meeting of the mining camp could be called to allow a dissatisfied party to plead his case and possibly get the decision reversed. This system generally was replicated throughout mining towns, but within different states, different systems existed. The work of mining, and its environment and conditions, were so different in different places, that the laws and customs of the miners had to vary even in adjoining districts.

== Miners' courts in Colorado ==
Early forms of government in Colorado included a mining code, which comprised nine resolutions serving as general guidelines for miners. As time went on, these resolutions proved insufficient, leading to the adoption of a new code. This new code included the appointment of a sheriff, who was granted the authority to serve notices and executions, summon parties and jurors, and enforce court decisions regarding property possession.

Previous laws regarding trials for disputed claims were repealed and replaced with a new law. Under this new law, an aggrieved person could file a complaint with any commissioned justice of the peace or, in their absence, with the president of the miners' association. The complaint needed to include the grounds of the grievance, the names of the parties involved, and a request for them to be summoned to appear and respond. The justice or president would then issue a summons for the opposing party to appear within three days. Failure to appear resulted in the complaint being accepted as true and execution issued. If the opposing party appeared and responded, a panel of nine people was summoned, from which each party struck off three names, leaving three to hear the evidence and try the case. If the losing party was dissatisfied with the decision, they could appeal to a jury of twelve men selected by the justice or president, whose decision would be final.

The losing party was liable for all court costs, with the justice or president issuing an execution for these costs, collectible from any of the party's property, except for tools, bedding, clothing, and provisions necessary for three months. Payment could also be made in the form of land or water rights, provided these were not essential for three months.

In 1860, this court system was legitimized when an act was approved to establish a miners' court and regulate its jurisdiction, setting regular times and places for holding court. The court's officers included a judge, a clerk, the sheriff of Arapahoe County and his deputies, and the officially admitted attorneys. The judge's duties were specified, and under certain conditions, the president of the district could preside in the judge's place.

The sheriff or his deputy would place the names of one hundred "good and suitable" men in a box, from which the judge or clerk would draw the names of eighteen men to be summoned for the next court term. The courts were primarily used to file complaints. Crimes committed within the district were to be punished as directed by a jury of twelve. Persons causing nuisances affecting the health of the inhabitants could be sued by the district, with damages not exceeding one hundred dollars and costs. Additionally, anyone obstructing a highway or leaving an open pit that endangered citizens was subject to penalties.

== Miners' courts in California ==
California found itself in legal limbo until December 1849, when its population adopted a constitution without congressional approval. It wasn't until the summer of 1850, over two years after the discovery of gold, that the new state courts were organized and ready to hear cases. By then, the mining camps had grown accustomed to self-management.

In the early years of the gold rush, before formal court systems were established, miners settled disputes through miners' courts. In California, these courts essentially functioned as meetings that served judicial purposes. Although meetings as forums for dispute resolution are rarely mentioned in diaries and letters, newspaper articles and other reliable sources indicate they were very common. These meetings effectively acted as civil trials.

However, miners' meetings as trial courts had significant drawbacks. They required substantial amounts of time and energy. Given the claim system, land disputes were frequent and often led to court cases. The meetings exemplified direct democracy to the extreme, involving the entire community in every legal question. When addressing novel legal issues, the meetings acted like appellate courts, setting new legal precedents and effectively altering the local code.

Miners' courts also often discriminated heavily against Spanish speakers.

== Miners' courts in Montana ==
Within Montana in 1864 miners’ courts were the only form of an organized justice system. Created to satisfy miners’ claim disputes, they proved inefficient when the cases were criminal. This led to the rise of Montana Vigilantes. An especially inefficient court case is recounted in John X. Beidler's memoir in which the voting was done by walking up or down a hill.

While the mining camps lacked private courts where individuals could pay for arbitration, they established a justice system through miners' courts. These courts rarely had permanent officers, although there were occasional justices of the peace. Most rulings were accepted without dispute, but there were options for recourse when disagreements arose.

For instance, in one case involving two partners, the losing partner, dissatisfied with the miners' court ruling, called a mass meeting of the camp to present his case, resulting in the decision being reversed. Additionally, if a larger group of miners was unhappy with general rulings about camp boundaries or individual claim disputes, they posted notices in various locations calling for a meeting to discuss dividing the territory. If the majority supported this action, the district would be set apart and named.
