= Bannack, Montana =

Ghost town in Beaverhead County, Montana

- Bannack Historic District
- U.S. National Register of Historic Places
- U.S. National Historic Landmark District
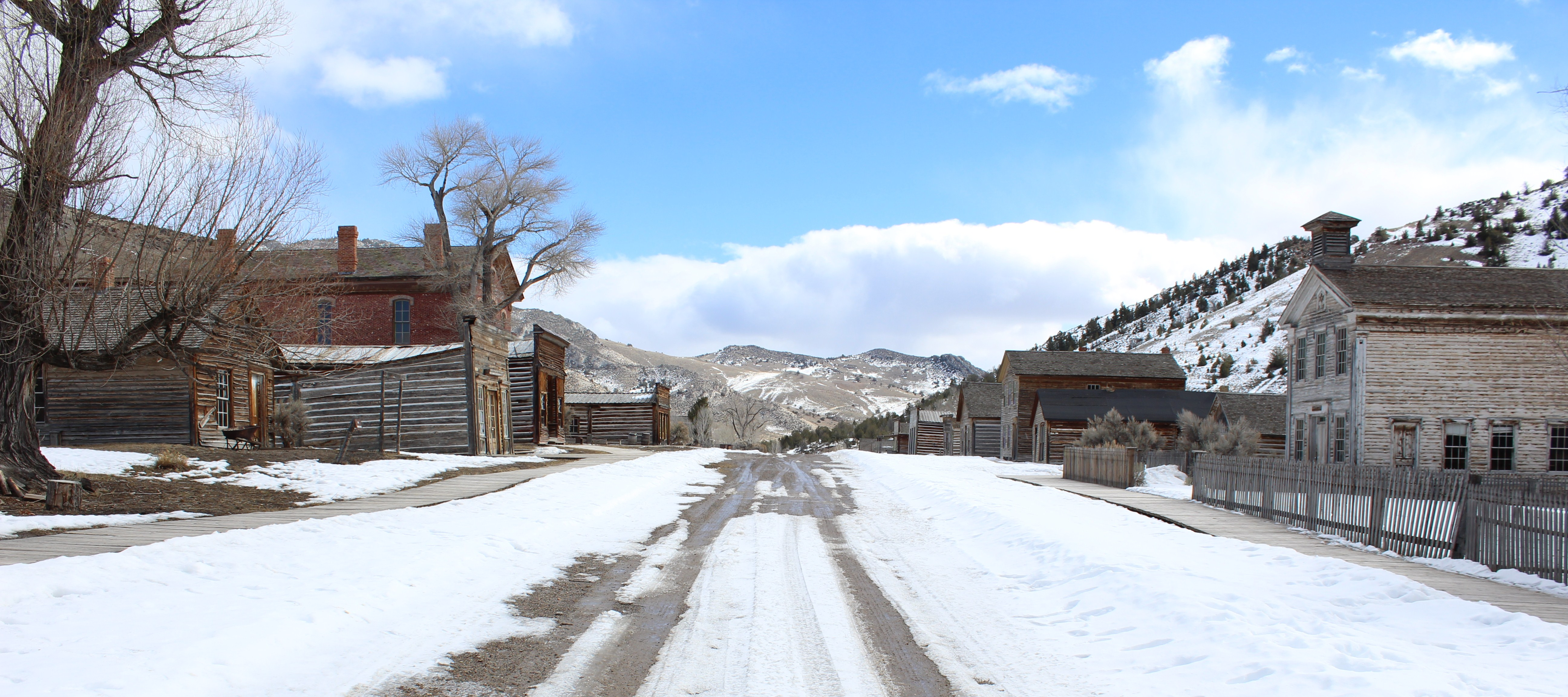
- Main street in Bannack

- Location within Montana Location within the United States
- Location: Beaverhead County, Montana
- Nearest city: Dillon, Montana
- Coordinates: 45°09′40″N 112°59′44″W
- Area: 1 square mile (2.6 km^{2})
- Built: 1862
- Website: Official website
- NRHP reference No.: 66000426

Significant dates
- Added to NRHP: October 15, 1966
- Designated NHLD: July 4, 1961

Bannack is a ghost town in Beaverhead County, Montana, United States, located on Grasshopper Creek, approximately 11 miles (18 km) upstream from where Grasshopper Creek joins with the Beaverhead River south of Dillon. Founded in 1862, the town is a National Historic Landmark managed by the state of Montana as Bannack State Park.

== History ==
Founded in 1862 and named after the local Bannock natives, Bannack was the site of a major gold discovery in 1862, and served as the capital of Montana Territory briefly in 1864, until the capital was moved to Virginia City. Bannack continued as a mining town, though with a dwindling population. The last residents left in the 1970s.

At its peak, Bannack, combined with the smaller settlements in the same gulch, totaled approximately 5,000 people. Extremely remote, it was connected to the rest of the world only by the Montana Trail. There were three hotels, three bakeries, three blacksmith shops, two stables, two meat markets, a grocery store, a restaurant, a brewery, a billiard hall, and four saloons. Though all of the businesses were built of logs, some had decorative false fronts.

Among the town's founders was Dr. Erasmus Darwin Leavitt, a physician born in Cornish, New Hampshire, who gave up medicine for a time to become a gold miner. Dr. Leavitt arrived in Bannack in 1862, and alternately practiced medicine and mined for gold with pick and shovel. "Though some success crowned his labors," according to a history of Montana by Joaquin Miller, "he soon found that he had more reputation as a physician than as a miner, and that there was greater profit in allowing someone else to wield his pick and shovel while he attended to his profession." Subsequently, Dr. Leavitt moved on to Butte, Montana, where he devoted the rest of his life to his medical practice.

In 1863, Captain James Stuart gathered a party in Bannack and rode up the Yellowstone River, passing Pompeys Pillar where Stuart noticed William Clark's signature, to the mouth of the Bighorn River, where they intended to survey a new settlement. They then turned south and descended down the Bighorn River into unceded Crow territory, which is to this day part of the Crow Indian Reservation. Eventually they were discovered by a band of Crow who attacked them viciously and chased them out of Crow territory, so that Stuart's party was forced to return all the way back to Bannack.

Bannack's sheriff, Henry Plummer, was accused by some of secretly leading a ruthless band of road agents, with early accounts claiming that this gang was responsible for over a hundred murders in the Virginia City and Bannack gold fields and trails to Salt Lake City. However, because only eight deaths are historically documented, some modern historians have called into question the exact nature of Plummer's gang, while others deny the existence of the gang altogether. In any case, Plummer and two compatriots, both deputies, were hanged, without trial, at Bannack on January 10, 1864. A number of Plummer's associates were lynched and others banished on pain of death if they ever returned. Twenty-two individuals were accused, informally tried, and hanged by the Vigilance Committee (the Montana Vigilantes) of Bannack and Virginia City. Nathaniel Pitt Langford, the first superintendent of Yellowstone National Park, was a member of that vigilance committee.

A number of mining camps dotted the banks of Grasshopper Creek during the gold booms, starting at Bannack downstream almost to where the stream joins Beaverhead River. While many were short lived and considered just extensions of Bannack, others were designated towns of their own. Yankee Flats adjoined Bannack and was referred to as an "addition" to Bannack. Centerville and Marysville, about 1 mile (1.6 km) downstream, were both laid out as little camps in the winter on 1862. By the following March, a townsite company had laid out and platted Centerville. However, Marysville, named for early arrival Mary Wadam, gained more people and so contemporary maps alternately used the name on record, Centerville, or the name used by locals, Marysville. Dogtown was south of and "near" Bannack in 1866. It was named for the numerous stray dogs, and had a blacksmith shop, saloon, and grocery store. Jerusalem (also New Jerusalem or Jerusalem Bar) was located 2 miles (3.2 km) downstream of Bannack. Bon Accord, about 5 miles (8.0 km) downstream, was a larger camp that saw a revival in the 1890s, and had a post office and school district. White's Bar, located possibly 10 miles (16 km) downstream, was where John White and Company made the initial discovery of gold in 28 Jul 1862.

Miners were lured to other, more promising sites, and by 1880, Bannack had only 250 residents. In that year, the Utah and Northern Railway terminated in a new town called Terminus rather than Bannack, and after this Bannack slowly declined. It was completely abandoned in the 1940s or early 1950s, and in 1953 the land was acquired by the Beaverhead County Museum.

== Climate ==
Dillon 18 WSW is a weather station located near Bannack.

Climate data for Dillon 18 WSW, Montana, 1991–2020 normals: 5971ft (1820m)
Month	Jan	Feb	Mar	Apr	May	Jun	Jul	Aug	Sep	Oct	Nov	Dec	Year
Record high °F (°C)	53 (12)	57 (14)	68 (20)	76 (24)	86 (30)	92 (33)	93 (34)	95 (35)	93 (34)	82 (28)	69 (21)	54 (12)	95 (35)
Mean maximum °F (°C)	42.5 (5.8)	44.8 (7.1)	56.0 (13.3)	69.2 (20.7)	76.9 (24.9)	85.7 (29.8)	90.7 (32.6)	90.9 (32.7)	85.4 (29.7)	72.8 (22.7)	59.3 (15.2)	45.4 (7.4)	91.8 (33.2)
Mean daily maximum °F (°C)	28.1 (−2.2)	31.9 (−0.1)	40.7 (4.8)	50.2 (10.1)	60.4 (15.8)	68.9 (20.5)	80.9 (27.2)	79.2 (26.2)	68.8 (20.4)	53.4 (11.9)	38.5 (3.6)	28.4 (−2.0)	52.5 (11.4)
Daily mean °F (°C)	18.0 (−7.8)	20.4 (−6.4)	29.4 (−1.4)	37.9 (3.3)	46.8 (8.2)	54.0 (12.2)	62.4 (16.9)	60.6 (15.9)	51.8 (11.0)	39.4 (4.1)	26.5 (−3.1)	17.5 (−8.1)	38.7 (3.7)
Mean daily minimum °F (°C)	7.8 (−13.4)	9.0 (−12.8)	18.1 (−7.7)	25.5 (−3.6)	33.2 (0.7)	39.1 (3.9)	44.0 (6.7)	42.0 (5.6)	34.7 (1.5)	25.3 (−3.7)	14.6 (−9.7)	6.5 (−14.2)	25.0 (−3.9)
Mean minimum °F (°C)	−19.2 (−28.4)	−16.9 (−27.2)	−1.4 (−18.6)	11.8 (−11.2)	17.8 (−7.9)	28.4 (−2.0)	35.4 (1.9)	33.3 (0.7)	23.1 (−4.9)	8.7 (−12.9)	−8.7 (−22.6)	−21.6 (−29.8)	−27.9 (−33.3)
Record low °F (°C)	−37 (−38)	−42 (−41)	−25 (−32)	2 (−17)	8 (−13)	24 (−4)	29 (−2)	29 (−2)	16 (−9)	−13 (−25)	−23 (−31)	−35 (−37)	−42 (−41)
Average precipitation inches (mm)	0.34 (8.6)	0.56 (14)	0.56 (14)	1.00 (25)	1.59 (40)	1.84 (47)	0.62 (16)	0.69 (18)	0.85 (22)	0.86 (22)	0.47 (12)	0.71 (18)	10.09 (256.6)
Source 1: NOAA
Source 2: XMACIS2 (records & monthly max/mins)

== State park ==
Sixty historic log, brick, and frame structures remain standing in Bannack, many quite well preserved; most can be explored. The site, called the Bannack Historic District, was declared a National Historic Landmark in 1961. It joined the roster of Montana state parks in 1954. Volunteers work in conjunction with the state to preserve the fabled ghost town.

== Bannack Days ==
Every year, during the third weekend of July, this abandoned town witnesses a historical reconstitution known as "Bannack Days". For two days, Bannack State Park officials organize an event that attempts to revive the times when Bannack was a boom town, re-enacting the day-to-day lives of the miners who lived there during the gold rush. An authentic, old-fashioned breakfast is served in the old Hotel Meade, a well-preserved brick building which was for many years the seat of Beaverhead County, before it became Dillon, Montana.

== Physiography ==
The mines surrounding Bannack are located on both sides of Grasshopper Creek, which flows southeastward through the district and into the Beaverhead River about 12 miles (19 km) downstream.

== Gallery ==
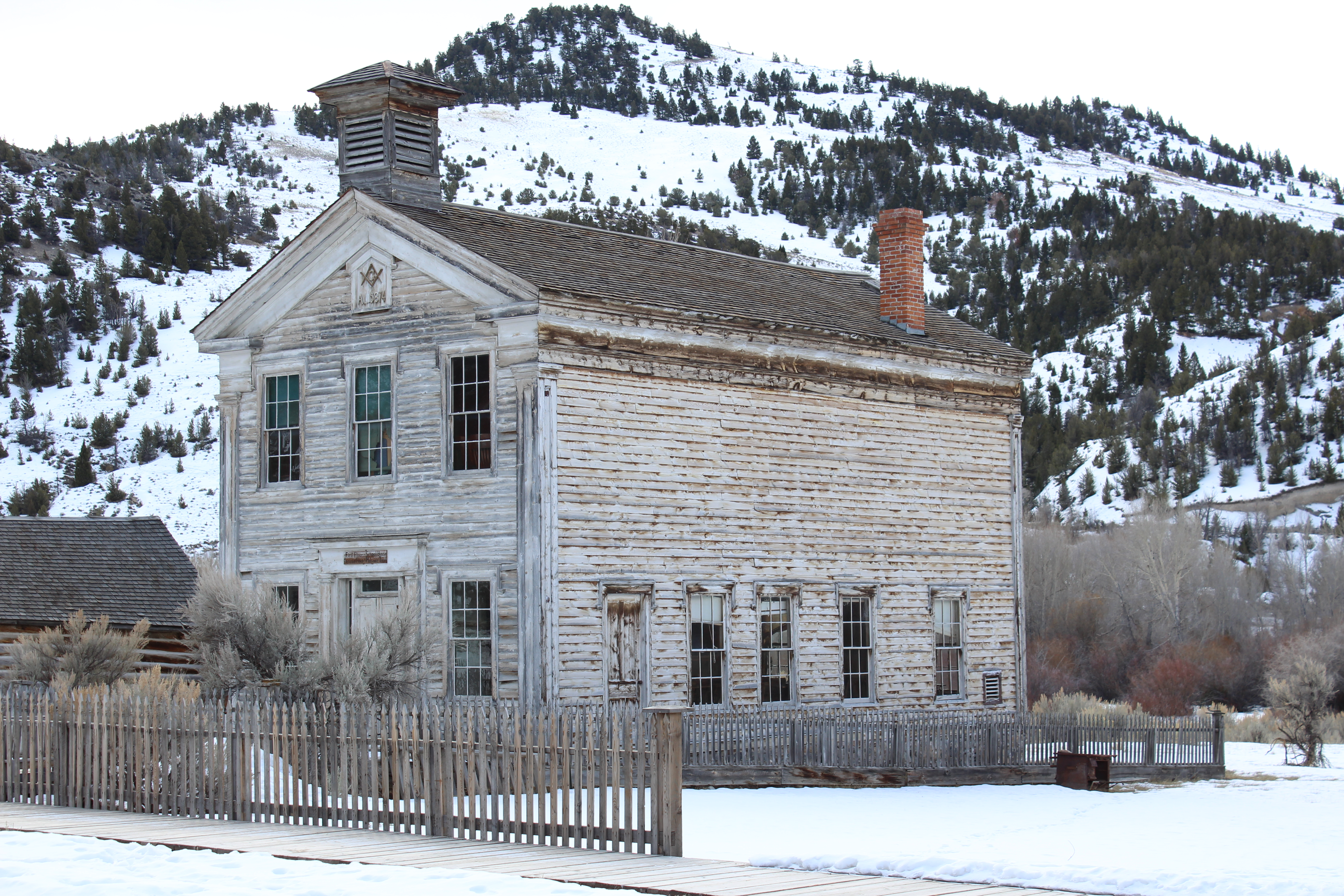
Schoolhouse and Masonic Lodge

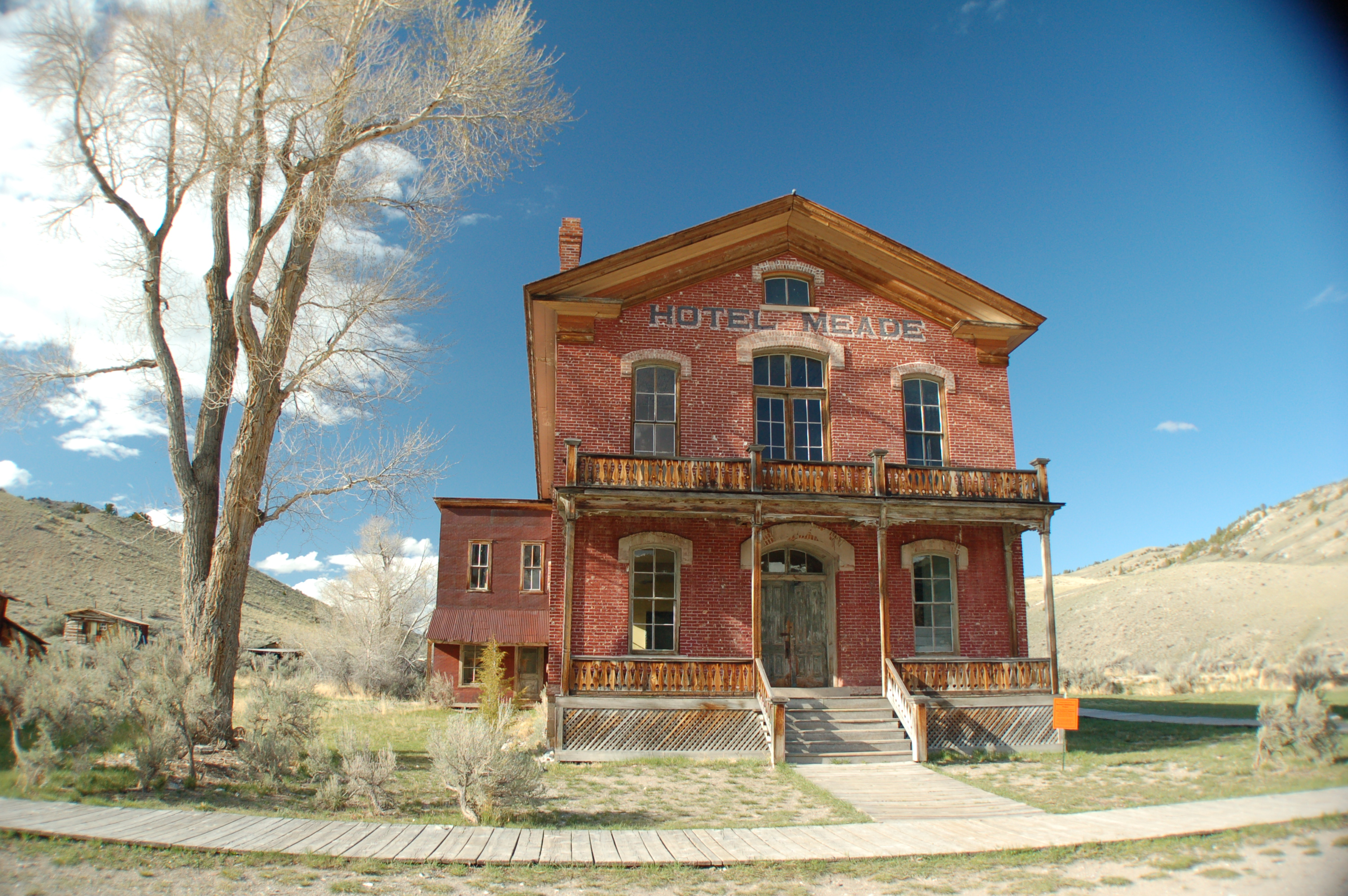
Hotel Meade

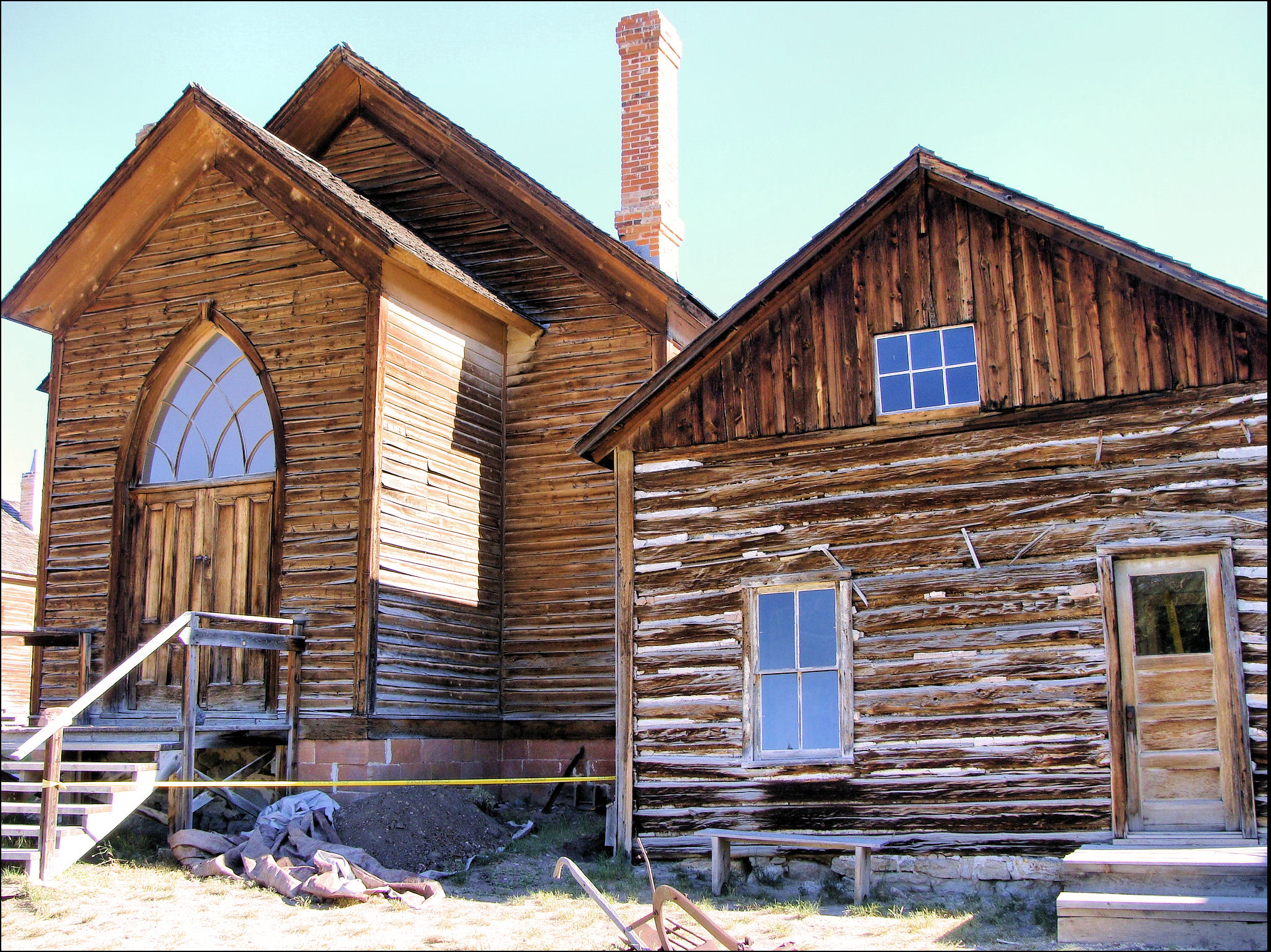
Methodist Church, built in 1877

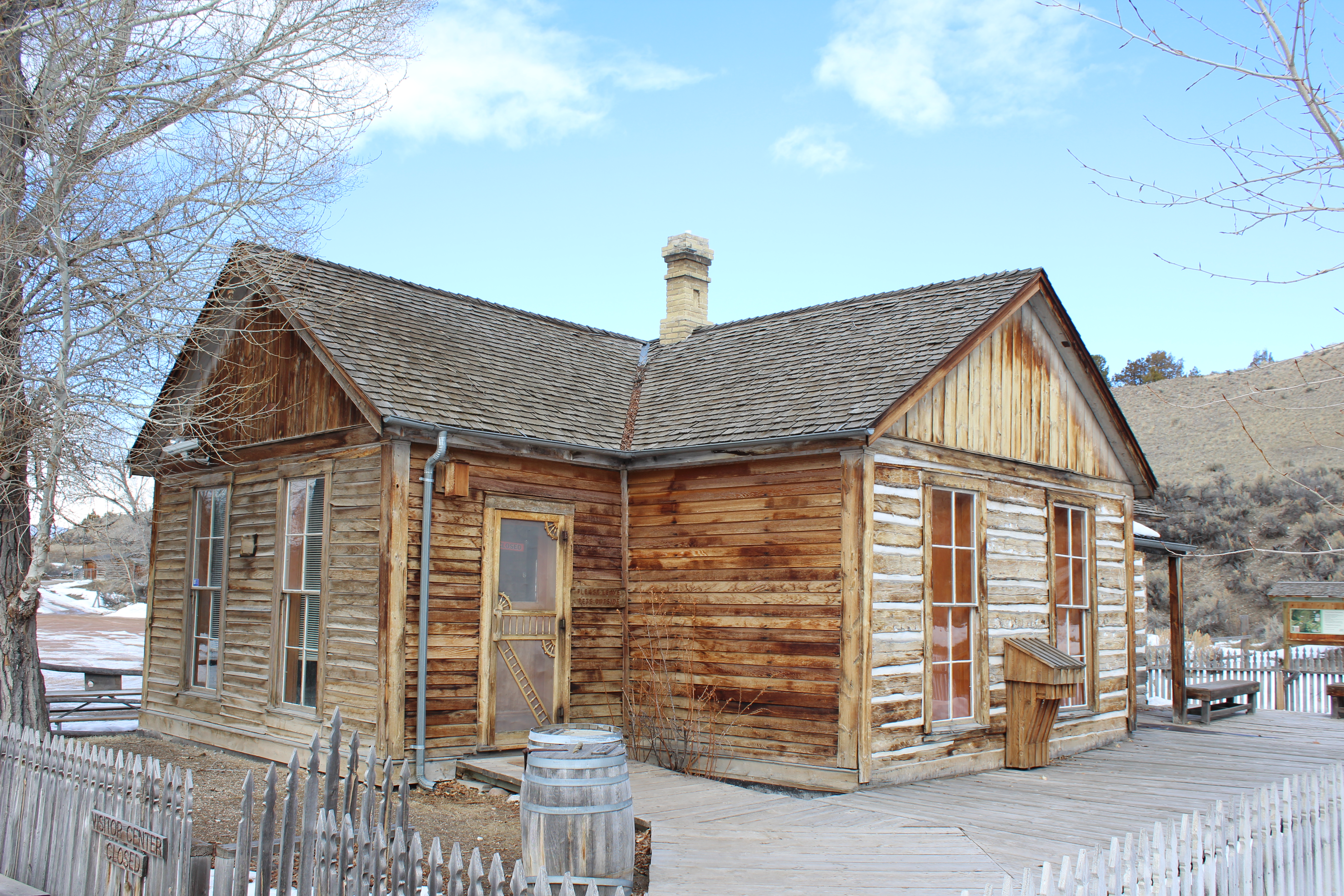
Private home in Bannack

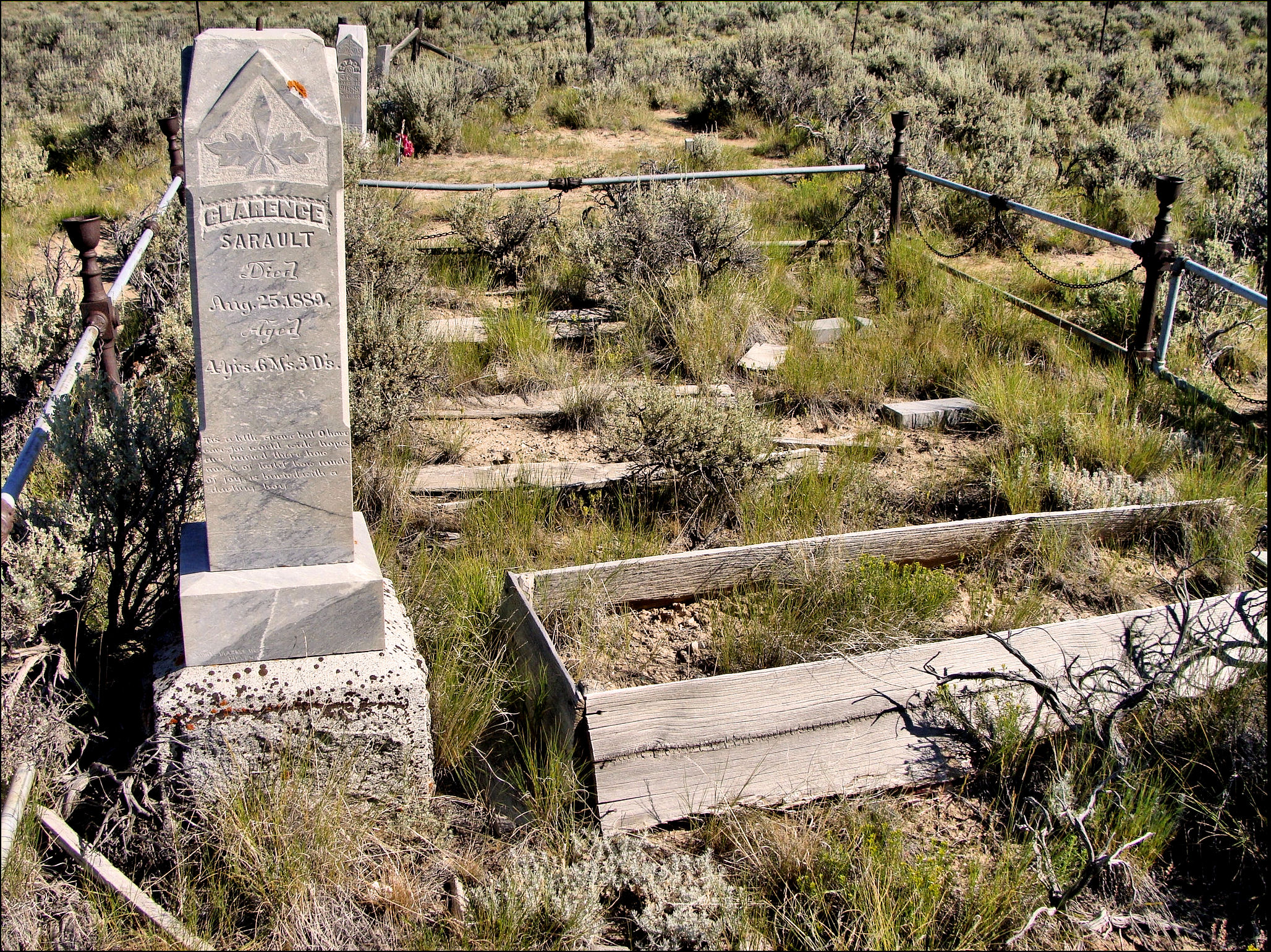
Family plot in cemetery

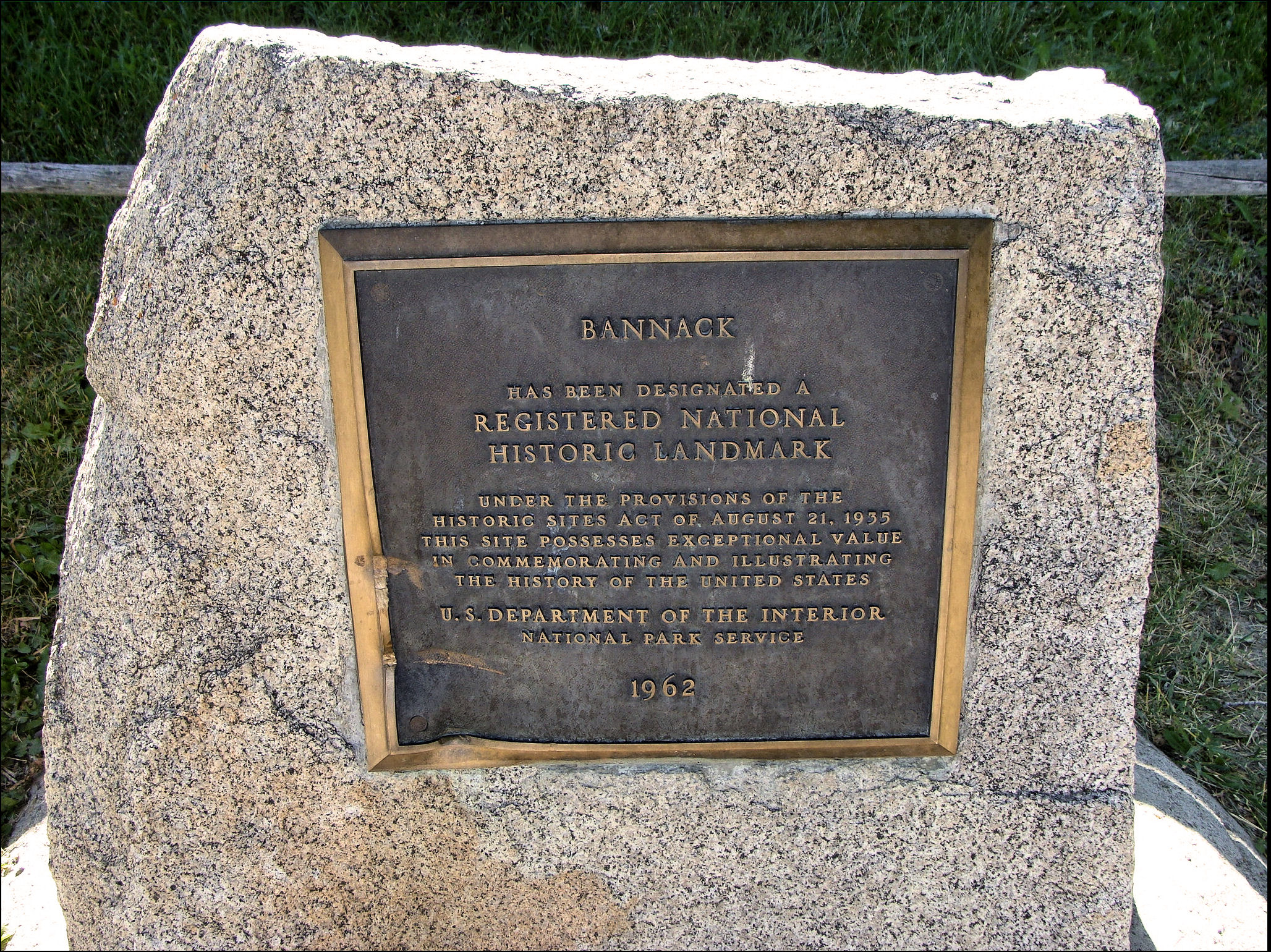
Historic landmark plaque

== See also ==
- List of ghost towns in Montana
- Montana Ghost Town Preservation Society
- List of National Historic Landmarks in Montana
- National Register of Historic Places listings in Beaverhead County, Montana

== Bibliography ==
- Spectrum Engineering; Abandoned Mine Reclamation Bureau Montana (1992). Bannack State Park Project. Billings, Montana: Montana State Library. p. 194.
