= Blacktail Deer Creek =

Tributary of the Beaverhead River

- Location of mouth

Location
- Country: United States
- State: Montana
- County: Beaverhead

Physical characteristics
- Source
  - coordinates: 44°51′34″N 112°07′24″W
  - elevation: 5,069 feet (1,545 m)
- Mouth
  - coordinates: 45°13′53″N 112°38′02″W

Basin features
- River system: Missouri River

Blacktail Deer Creek is a tributary of the Beaverhead River, approximately 38 miles (61 km) long, in southwest Montana, United States.

It rises in the Beaverhead National Forest in the Snowcrest Range in southern Beaverhead County. It flows northwest, joining the Beaverhead River near Dillon, Montana.

The creek contains rainbow, brook and brown trout as well as mountain whitefish, longnose sucker, longnose dace and mottled sculpin. On August 7–8, 1863, a group of 28 prospectors embarked from the mouth of Blacktail Deer Creek to prospect for gold in the upper Snake River in Idaho Territory.

The elected captain of the group was Walter W. de Lacy who later produced the first map (1865) of Montana Territory based in part from observations during this expedition.

== Variant names ==
Blacktail Deer Creek has also been known as: Dry Blacktail Creek.

== See also ==
- List of rivers of Montana
- Montana Stream Access Law
