= Nevada City, Montana =

Community in Madison County

- Unincorporated community
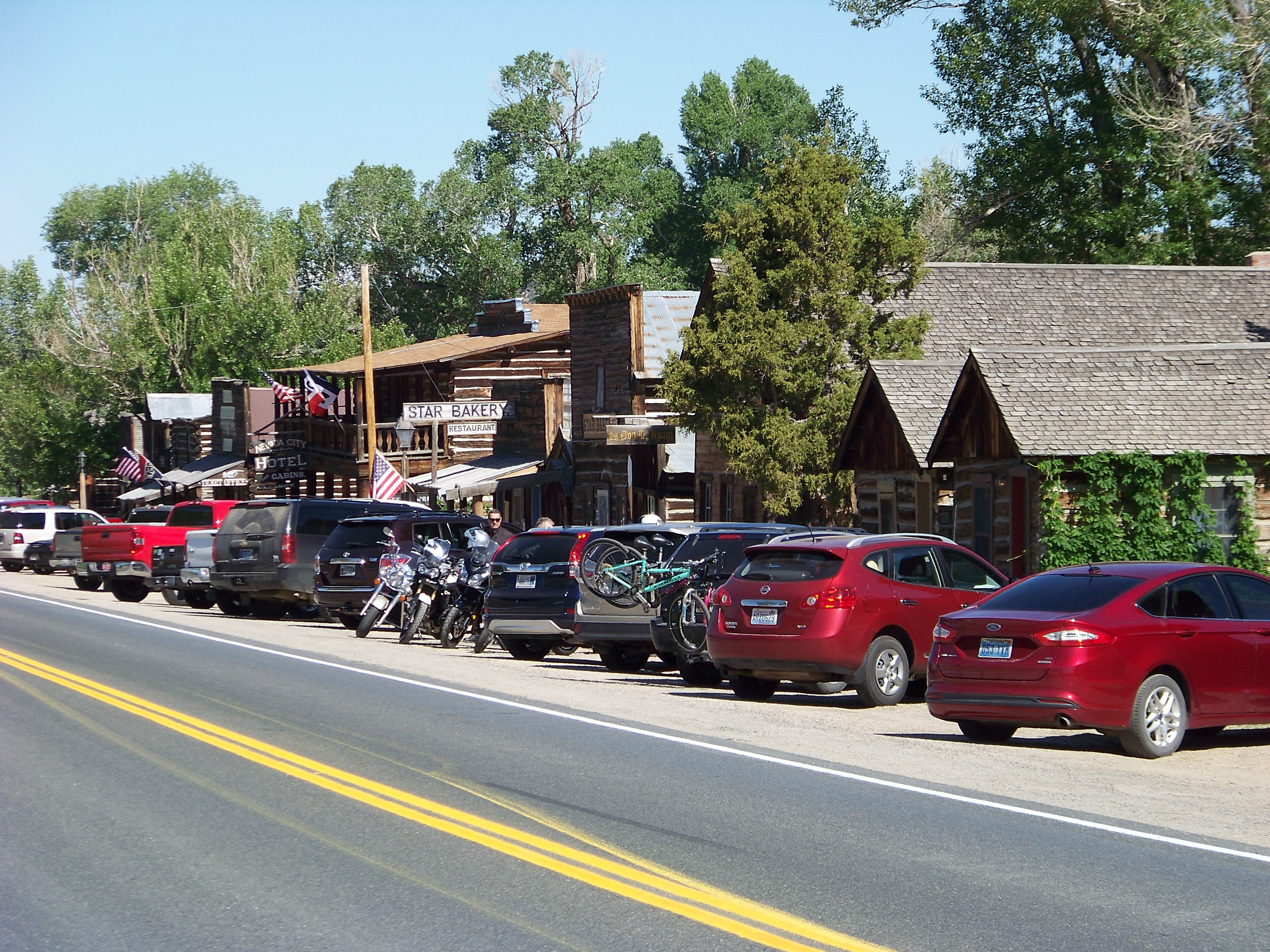
- Nevada City, as seen from the highway

- Location within Montana Location within the United States
- Coordinates: 45°18′27″N 111°58′4.8″W
- Country: United States
- State: Montana
- County: Madison
- Elevation: 5,761 ft (1,756 m)
- Time zone: UTC-7 (Mountain (MST))
  - Summer (DST): UTC-6 (MDT)

Nevada City (/nɪˈveɪdə/ niv-AY-də) is an unincorporated community in Madison County, Montana, United States. In the 1860s, it was one of two centers of commerce in what was known as one of the richest gold strikes in the Rocky Mountain West, along with its sister city Virginia City. As the gold played out and prospectors moved away, Nevada City gradually became a ghost town. Since the late 1950s, Nevada City has become a tourist attraction for its collection of nineteenth-century buildings within or surrounding the Nevada City Museum and Music Hall.

== History ==
Archaeological evidence found between the Music Hall and the Nevada City Hotel indicates earlier than mining-era habitation, possibly by white hunters or trappers.

In 1863, the discovery of gold in Alder Gulch sparked a gold rush to the area. Miners quickly settled the length of the gulch and established homes and businesses. Nevada City was occupied by residents as early as June 6, 1863. On December 19, 1863, a miners' court trial took place. The trial was for the murder of Nicholas Tbalt, a Dutchman. George Ives was convicted and in less than an hour he was hanged in the middle of town while nearly 2,000 residents watched (“Nevada City, Montana.”).

Nevada City became an incorporated city on February 9, 1865. The most commonly listed occupation of Nevada City's working class was "placer miner." During the selection of territorial capitol, Nevada City was considered with Bannack and Virginia City for that distinction. The early city limits of Nevada City started 400 feet west of W. R. Lockwood’s house in Central City then went south ½ mile, west 1 ¾ mile, and south to the place of beginning. By 1869, the population of the mining camp had fallen to about 100 people. In 1869 mercantile representation included three general stores, and two saloons. In April 1872, the city contained one miners' store, one brewery, blacksmith shop, butcher shop, livery stable, and a Masonic Hall. Most of the citizens were engaged in mining pursuits, but some of the residents had farms and stock in the valley

By 1880, only 50 residents remained in Nevada City. In 1896, the Conrey Placer Mining Company was organized to dredge the gulch for the next 24 years, destroying many of Nevada City’s buildings. When the mining had come to an end in 1922, about $2.5 billion worth of gold in today's market had been extracted. The dredges were then disassembled and the heavy wooden barges were left to slowly be reclaimed by nature. Other original Nevada City buildings were destroyed when the highway was built through the area.

In the 1950s, Charles Bovey, a former state senator, began buying land and property in Nevada City in order to redevelop the town as an outdoor museum. Over the next twenty years, Bovey reconstructed Nevada City, moving nearly one hundred historic buildings from other sites and adding them to the fifteen original gold-rush era buildings that remained in Nevada City. Forrest "Scotty" Zion of the Great Falls business, Zion Construction and Housemoving, was a close friend of the Bovey's and moved the buildings from various locations. With few existing historic photographs to guide him, Bovey assembled buildings to represent an earlier era, including saloons, a school, a blacksmith, a barbershop, a post office, and cabins. He relocated seven buildings associated with Chinese communities from around Madison County to create a sort of Chinatown in Nevada City. The Music Hall building came from Yellowstone National Park, and Bovey filled it with a collection of organs and coin-operated music players from Brooklyn, New York. The Nevada City Hotel was created by joining a building from Salisbury, Montana, to a structure from Yellowstone.

== Present day ==
Today, the town is owned by the State of Montana and managed by the Montana Heritage Commission. The town consists of an open-air museum that includes 108 buildings. Fourteen buildings are original to the town site. Businesses in the town are Alder Gulch Accommodations, Nevada City Hotel and Cabins, Just an Experience Bed and Breakfast, The Star Bakery, and the Nevada City Hotel Coffee Shop. Some of the businesses are operational year round, others are operational during the summer season. The town has been restored as an outdoor living history historical museum, linked by railroad to the Virginia City Historic District with numerous historic buildings, artifacts, and furnishings.

Nevada City is also home to North America’s largest collection of automated music machines which can be found in the Nevada City Music Hall (“Nevada City.”).

== Geography ==
Nevada City is approximately 27 miles southeast of Twin Bridges on Montana Highway 287. The town site is located 1½ miles west of Virginia City.
