= The Montana Standard =

Newspaper in Butte, Montana

- Type: Daily newspaper
- Format: Broadsheet
- Owner: Lee Enterprises
- Founder: Marcus Daly
- Publisher: Bill Merrill
- Editor: Phil Drake
- Founded: 1889; 137 years ago
- Language: English
- Headquarters: 25 West Granite Street; Butte, Montana 59701
- Country: United States
- Circulation: 9,837 Daily (as of 2023)
- OCLC number: 11938457
- Website: mtstandard.com

The Montana Standard is a daily newspaper in Butte, Montana, owned by Lee Enterprises. It was formed from a merger of the Butte Miner and the Butte edition of the Anaconda Standard that was founded in Anaconda, Montana in 1889.

== History ==
The first issue of The Anaconda Standard published on September 4, 1889, in Anaconda, Montana. It was funded by Marcus Daly, owner of the Anaconda Copper Mining Company. Daly used the paper to promote his own causes and battle rival copper king William A. Clark, who published the Butte Miner, along with rival Thomas H. Carter.

Daly used the paper to further his political and financial reach. By 1920, the Anaconda Company owned several additional Montana newspapers including the Butte Post, Butte Miner, Daily Missoulian, Helena Independent, and Billings Gazette.

After Clark's death, his heirs sold the company, including the Butte Miner, to Anaconda Co. On September 12, 1928, the Standard merged its Butte edition with Butte Miner, based in nearby Butte, Montana, to form The Montana Standard. The Anaconda paper continued for a few more years until it had become an insert in the Butte paper by 1933.

In 1959, the Anaconda Company sold its eight Montana newspapers, including the Standard, to the Lee Newspaper Group. The company change its name to Lee Enterprises in 1960. Starting July 11, 2023, the print edition of the newspaper was reduced to three days a week: Tuesday, Thursday and Saturday. Also, the newspaper transitioned from carrier to postal delivery.

== Awards ==
In 1971, under the leadership of Betty Danfield, the paper's women's section won the Penney-Missouri Award for General Excellence.
