= Helen Duncan (disambiguation) =

Helen Duncan (1897–1956) was a Scottish medium best known as the last person to be imprisoned under the British Witchcraft Act 1735 (9 Geo. 2. c. 5).

Helen Duncan may also refer to:

- Helen Duncan (politician) (1941–2007), member of the New Zealand House of Representatives
- Helen M. Duncan (1910–1971), United States geologist and paleontologist
