= Anaconda Standard =

American newspaper

The Anaconda Standard
- Type: 5 days per week
- Format: 8 page, 6 column
- Owner: Marcus Daly
- Founded: 1889
- Ceased publication: 1970
- Headquarters: Anaconda, Montana, United States
- ISSN: 2163-4483
- OCLC number: 10309820

The Anaconda Standard was a newspaper published in Anaconda, Montana. The first issue was published on September 4, 1889 and the final issue was published on June 20, 1970.

The Anaconda newspaper was funded by Marcus Daly and owned by his company the Anaconda Copper Mining Company. It is likely the newspaper was created in reaction to a rivalry between Daly and Thomas H. Carter.

Daly used the paper to further his political and financial reach. By 1920, the Anaconda Company owned several additional Montana newspapers including the Butte Post, Butte Miner, Daily Missoulian, Helena Independent, and Billings Gazette.

On September 12, 1928 the Standard merged its Butte edition with Butte Miner, based in nearby Butte, Montana, to form The Montana Standard.
