= Boone Helm =

American mountain man and cannibal (1828–1864)

Levi Boone Helm
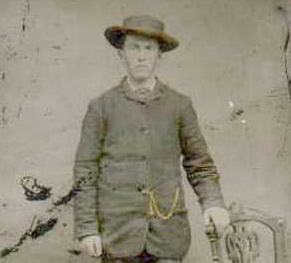
- Undated photograph of Helm
- Born: January 28, 1828; Lincoln County, Kentucky, U.S.
- Died: January 14, 1864 (aged 35); Virginia City, Montana, U.S.
- Other name: The Kentucky Cannibal
- Status: Executed by hanging
- Conviction: Murder
- Penalty: Death

Details
- Victims: 11+
- Span of crimes: 1850–1864
- Country: United States
- States: California; Idaho; Kentucky; Missouri; Montana; Oregon; Utah

Levi Boone Helm (January 28, 1828 – January 14, 1864) was an American mountain man, gunfighter, and serial killer known as the Kentucky Cannibal. Helm gained his nickname for his opportunistic and unrepentant proclivity for consuming human flesh, usually in survival situations, though instances of killing people for their meat unprovoked were also documented.

== Early life ==
Boone Helm was born in Lincoln County, Kentucky, to Joseph B. Helm and Nancy Wilcox, who moved to Jackson Township, Monroe County, Missouri, when he was still a boy. Helm delighted in demonstrating feats of strength and agility, such as throwing his Bowie knife into the ground and retrieving it from a horse at full gallop. In one demonstration of his contempt for authority, Helm, on horseback, rebuffed a sheriff's attempt to arrest him by walking his horse up the stairs of a courthouse and into the courtroom, while the circuit court was in session, and by verbally haranguing the judge.

In 1851, Helm married 17-year-old Lucinda Frances Browning in Monroe County, Missouri, and fathered a daughter, Lucy. He became known for his heavy drinking, riding his horse into the house, and beating his wife. The domestic violence grew to such an extent that Lucinda petitioned for divorce. Helm's father paid for the costs. Having bankrupted his father and ruined his family's reputation, Helm decided to move to California in search of gold.

== Serial murder and cannibalism ==
For the journey to California, Helm asked his cousin, Littlebury Shoot, to accompany him. Shoot initially agreed, but when he attempted to back out of the trip, an angered Helm murdered him by stabbing him in the chest and headed west alone. He was pursued and captured by Littlebury's brother and friends and convicted of murder, but his antics in captivity quickly landed him in a mental asylum. Upon entering the asylum, Helm became taciturn and convinced his guard to take him on walks through the woods. After these walks became routine, Helm was able to escape.

Once again traveling west to California, Helm murdered several men in various altercations. Forced to flee to avoid arrest and vigilante justice, he teamed up with six men to whom he confided that he had eaten all, or part, of his murder victims: "Many's the poor devil I've killed, at one time or another – and the time has been that I've been obliged to feed on some of 'em."

An attack by Native Americans on the way to Fort Hall forced Helm and his party into the wilderness. Short on provisions, the men killed their horses, ate the meat, and made snowshoes out of the hides. The journey was arduous, reducing the party down to Helm and a man named Elijah Burton. When Burton could go no further, Helm left him only to return in time to hear Burton taking his own life with a pistol. Helm ate one of Burton's legs and wrapped the other to take with him on his journey. Helm was finally discovered by a man named John W. Powell at an Indian camp. Powell agreed to let Helm accompany him to Salt Lake City, Utah, but despite having over fourteen hundred dollars in coins on his person, Helm reportedly neither paid nor thanked Powell for his generosity.

Upon reaching San Francisco, Helm killed a rancher who had befriended him and taken him in. He then traveled to Oregon and resumed robbing people for a living, frequently murdering them. In 1862, after heavily drinking, Helm gunned down an unarmed man named Dutch Fred in a saloon and fled. While on the run, Helm ate another fugitive who had been accompanying him. Captured by the authorities, Helm implored his brother "Old Tex", one of Helm's twelve siblings, for assistance. With a considerable amount of money, "Old Tex" paid off all of the witnesses. Unable to convict Helm, the authorities released him and he accompanied his brother to Texas. Helm soon reappeared at many of the settlements mentioned before, killing more men in the process. He was finally apprehended in Montana.

== Capture and execution ==
After teaming up with the notorious Henry Plummer and his gang, the "Innocents", Helm and four other gang members were captured, arrested, and tried in secret. At trial, Helm kissed the Bible and then proceeded to perjure himself, accusing "Three-Fingered" Jack Gallagher, Helm's close friend and fellow gang member, of crimes Helm himself had committed. The Montana Vigilantes hanged Helm, Gallagher, and other members of the gang in Virginia City, Montana on January 14, 1864 in front of a crowd of six thousand. Upon seeing his friend Gallagher hanged, Helm reportedly remarked "Kick away old fellow. My turn next. I'll be in Hell with you in a minute."

When the executioner approached Helm, he allegedly exclaimed "Every man for his principles! Hurrah for Jeff Davis! Let 'er rip!" and then jumped off the hangman's box before it could be kicked away. Boone Helm is buried in Boot Hill cemetery, Virginia City.

== See also ==
- Liver-Eating Johnson
- List of incidents of cannibalism
- List of serial killers in the United States
