= Ralph E. DeCamp =

American painter (1858–1936)

- Born: September 17, 1858; Attica, New York, U.S.
- Died: May 27, 1936 (aged 77); Chicago, Illinois, U.S.
- Resting place: Forestvale Cemetery, Helena, Montana, U.S.
- Occupations: Painter, photographer
- Spouse: Edna Blanchard

Ralph E. DeCamp (September 17, 1858 – May 27, 1936) was an American painter and photographer. Born in New York, he grew up in Wisconsin and Minnesota before relocating to Montana, where he opened a studio in Helena. He did six murals in the Montana State Capitol in 1911 and four more in 1927. He lived in Chicago from 1934 to 1936, and he was buried in the Forestvale Cemetery, Helena. Many of his paintings and negatives are at the Montana Historical Society Museum.
