= Virginia City, Montana =

- Town
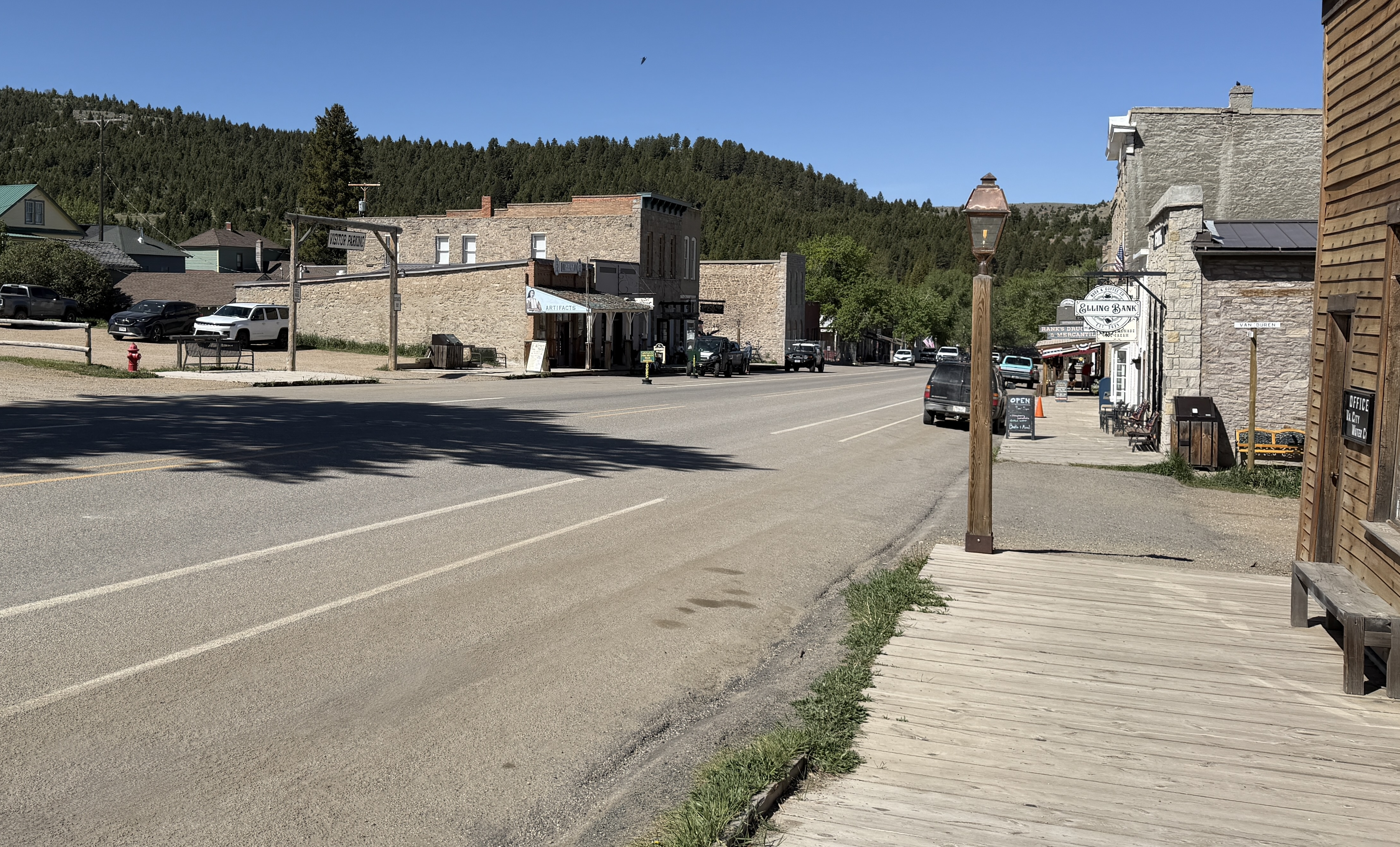
- Downtown Virginia City in May 2026

- Location in Madison County and the state of Montana
- Coordinates: 45°17′46″N 111°56′13″W
- Country: United States
- State: Montana
- County: Madison

Area
  - Total: 0.95 sq mi (2.46 km^{2})
  - Land: 0.95 sq mi (2.46 km^{2})
  - Water: 0 sq mi (0.00 km^{2})
- Elevation: 5,919 ft (1,804 m)

Population (2020)
  - Total: 219
  - Density: 230.6/sq mi (89.05/km^{2})
- Time zone: UTC−7 (Mountain (MST))
  - Summer (DST): UTC−6 (MDT)
- ZIP code: 59755
- Area code: 406
- FIPS code: 30-77125
- GNIS feature ID: 2413436

Virginia City is a town in and the county seat of Madison County, Montana, United States. Virginia City was the territorial capital of Montana from 1865 to 1875. In 1961 the town and the surrounding area were designated a National Historic Landmark District, the Virginia City Historic District. The population was 219 at the 2020 census.

== History ==
=== Founding ===
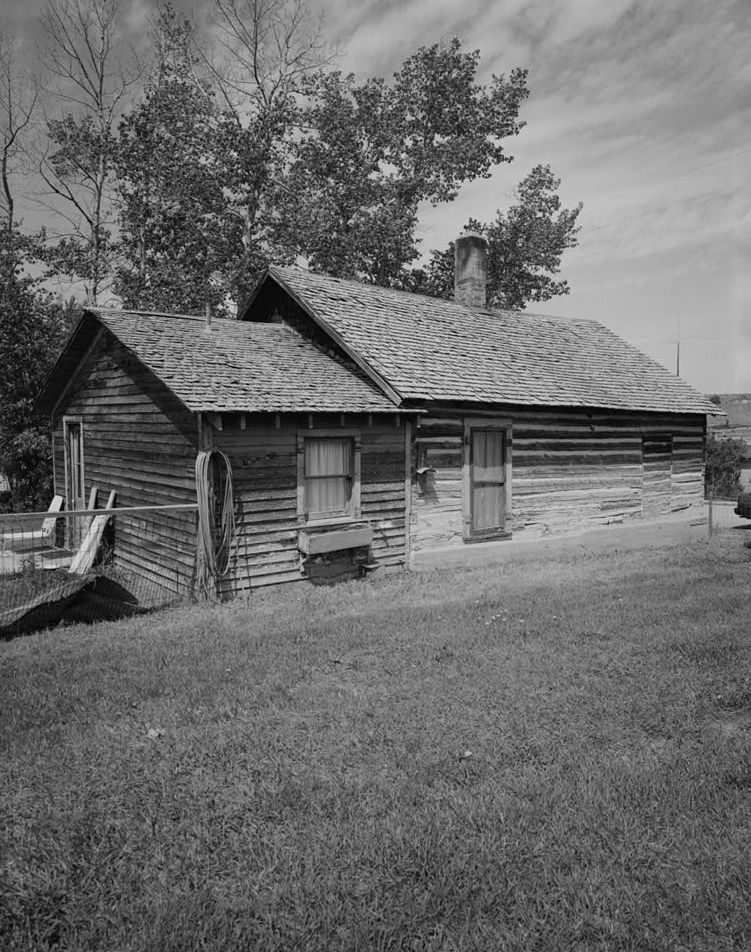
Thomas Francis Meagher House, Virginia City

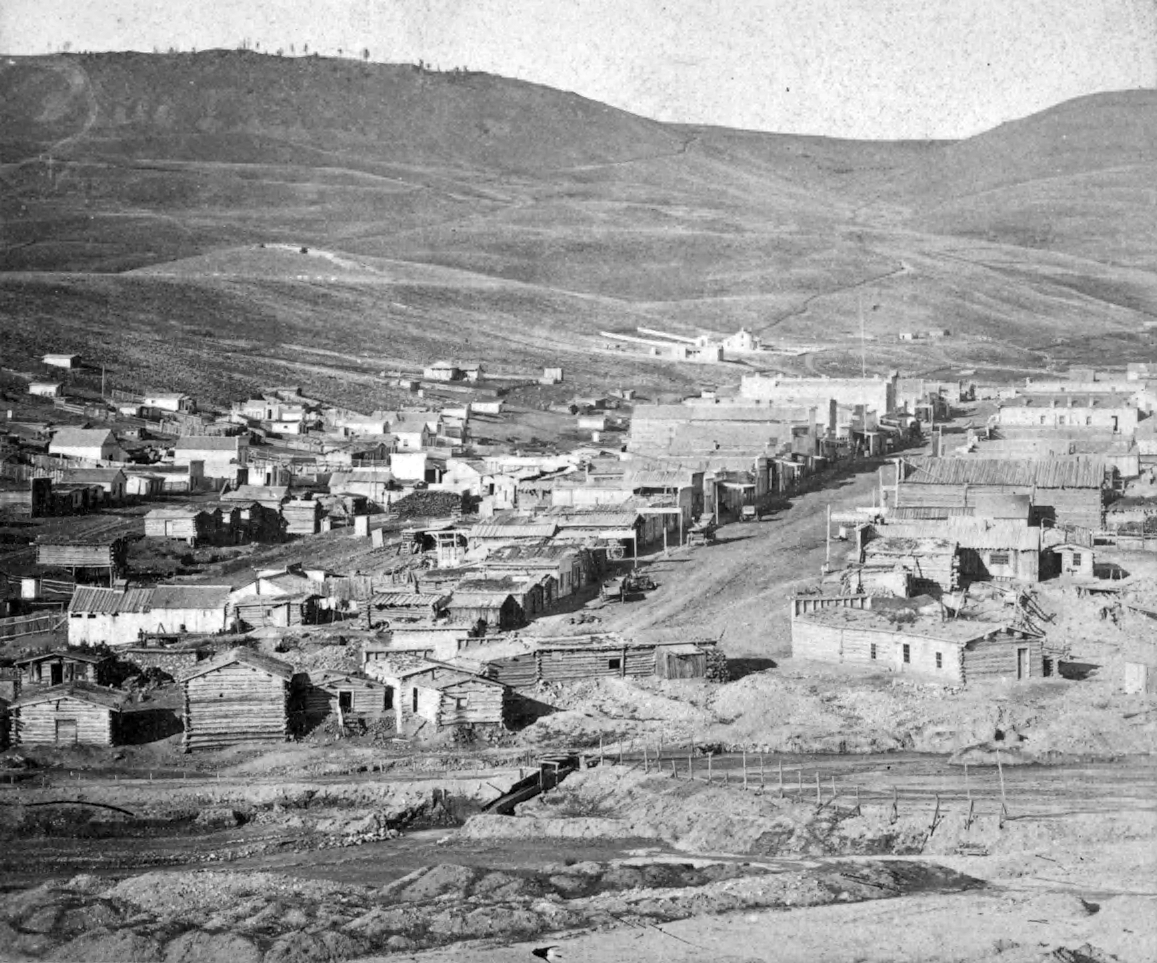
Virginia City from Alder Gulch in the late 1890s, by Charles Roscoe Savage

In May 1863, a group of prospectors were headed toward the Yellowstone River and instead came upon a party of the Crow people and were forced to return to Bannack. On May 26, 1863, Bill Fairweather and Henry Edgar discovered gold near Alder Creek. The prospectors could not keep the site a secret and were followed on their return to the gold-bearing site. A mining district was set up in order to formulate rules about individual gold claims. On June 16, 1863, the township was formed under the name of "Verina" a mile south of the gold fields. The name was intended to honor Varina Howell Davis, the first and only First Lady of the Confederate States of America during the American Civil War. Verina, although in Union territory, was founded by men whose loyalties were thoroughly Confederate. Upon registration of the name, a Connecticut judge, G. G. Bissell, objected to their choice and recorded it as Virginia City.

Within weeks Virginia City was a boomtown of thousands of prospectors and fortune seekers in the midst of a gold rush. The remote region of the Idaho Territory was without law enforcement or justice system, with the exception of miners' courts. In late 1863, the great wealth in the region, lack of a justice system and the insecure means of travel gave rise to serious criminal activity, especially robbery and murder along the trails and roads of the region. "Road agents", as they became known, were ultimately responsible for up to 100 deaths in the region in 1863 and 1864. This resulted in the formation of the Vigilance Committee of Alder Gulch and the infamous Montana Vigilantes. Up to 15 road agents were hanged by the vigilantes in December 1863 and January 1864, including the sheriff of Bannack and alleged leader of the road agent gang, Henry Plummer.

The Montana Territory was organized out of the existing Idaho Territory by Act of Congress and signed into law by President Abraham Lincoln on May 26, 1864. Although Bannack was the first territorial capital, the territorial legislature moved the capital to Virginia City on February 7, 1865. It remained the capital until April 19, 1875, when it moved to Helena. Thomas Dimsdale began publication of Montana's first newspaper, the Montana Post, in Virginia City on August 27, 1864. Montana's first public school was established in Virginia City in March 1866.

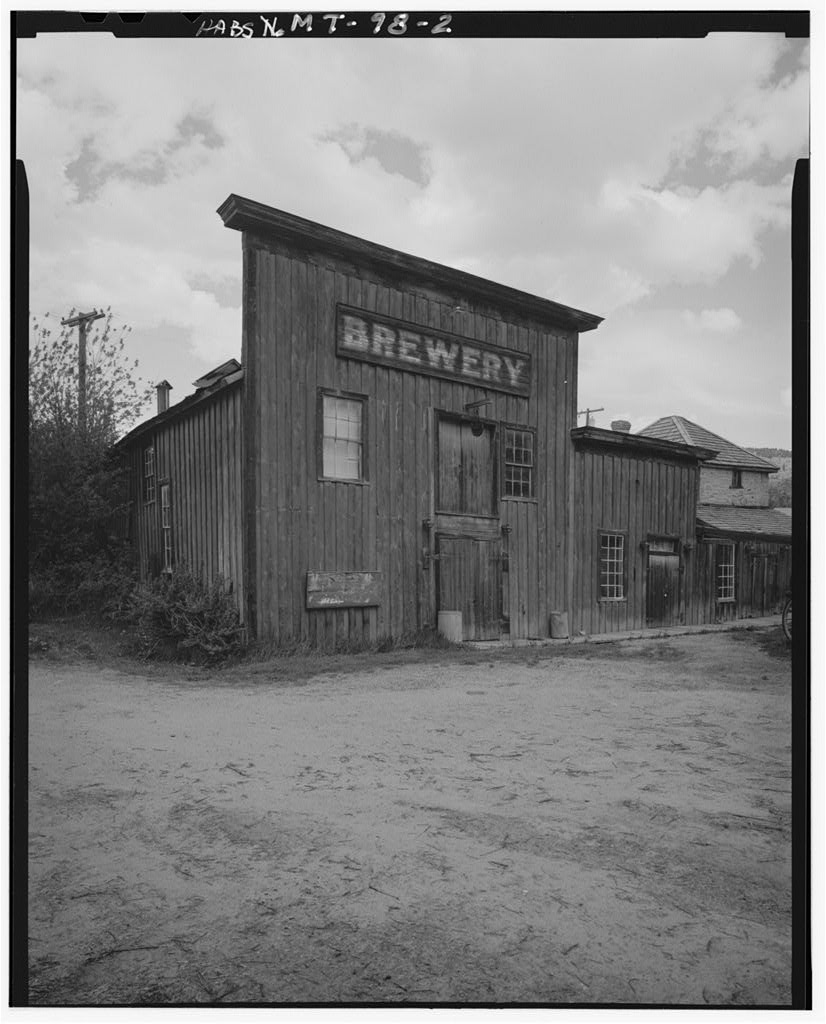
Gilbert Brewery, Wallace Street, Virginia City, founded in 1866 by Henry S. Gilbert (1833–1902)

=== Preservation ===
Virginia City's population dwindled starting in the 1880s as the easily-extracted placer gold played out and miners moved away. Federal monetary policy in the 1930s reduced the gold content of the U.S. dollar, making gold relatively more valuable, which led to some gold mining revival across the west. However, in 1942, the National War Labor Board's Limitation Order 209 made nearly all gold mining in the United States illegal, practically shuttering the gold mining industry in the United States. By the mid- to late-1940s, the town's gold rush-era buildings were being abandoned or dismantled for their lumber. Charles and Sue Bovey began buying the town, putting much needed maintenance into failing structures. The ghost town of Virginia City began to be restored for tourism in the 1950s. The Boveys operated the town as an open-air museum complete with artifacts and living history enactments. Of the nearly 300 structures in town, almost half were built before 1900. Buildings in their original condition with Old West period displays and information plaques stand next to presently active restaurants, gift shops, and other businesses. The town received National Historic Landmark status in 1962, and many of its buildings have been added to the National Register of Historic Places.

The National Park Service (NPS) considered adding the town to its system, conducting studies in 1937, 1980 and 1995. In the end, the state of Montana bought most of the historic buildings after the legislature authorized the purchase of the Bovey properties. Today, the Historic District of Virginia City and Nevada City is operated by the Montana Heritage Commission, with financial and technical assistance from the NPS. The commission operates gold panning, the Nevada City Music Hall and Museum, and the Alder Gulch Railroad.

Virginia City also has a Boot Hill cemetery, where the graves of Jack Gallagher, Boone Helm, "Clubfoot" George Lane, Hayes Lyons, and Frank Parrish—all road agents killed during Virginia City's vigilante era—are placed in a location neighboring Virginia City's main graveyard. The 2 ft 6 in (762 mm) narrow-gauge Alder Gulch Short Line Railroad transports passengers by rail to the nearby ghost town of Nevada City and back.

The backdrop as well as the staged bar photos used in fine art pieces by David Yarrow are located in Virginia City at the Pioneer bar.

=== Filmography ===
- The film The Missouri Breaks (1976) was partly filmed in Virginia City.
- The bar scenes in Little Big Man (1970) were filmed in the Bale of Hay Saloon, a landmark and watering hole in Virginia City.
- Steven Seagal's film The Patriot (1998) was partly filmed in Virginia City.

== Notable people ==
- Sarah Bickford, African American businesswoman, former slave
- John Bozeman, prospector, merchant, founder of Bozeman, Montana
- Calamity Jane, resident for some time
- Helen M. Duncan, geologist and paleontologist; grew up in Virginia City
- Boone Helm, notorious gunfighter, serial killer
- Hezekiah L. Hosmer, first Chief Justice of Montana Territory Supreme Court
- Nathaniel P. Langford, prospector, vigilante and first superintendent of Yellowstone National Park
- Thomas Francis Meagher, Irish nationalist, Civil War general, Secretary of State
- Joseph Millard, later a U.S. senator from Nebraska; lived and opened a bank here
- Wilbur F. Sanders, founding member of the Vigilance Committee and U.S. senator from Montana
- George Laird Shoup, governor of Idaho; moved here after the Civil War
- Jack Slade, Pony Express co-founder and gunfighter; lynched here
- Sam V. Stewart, governor and Supreme Court justice of Montana; practiced law here
- Nelson Story, prospector, merchant and cattleman
- Granville Stuart, prospector, vigilante, merchant
- William Boyce Thompson, founder of Newmont Mining; born here
- A. A. Townsend, captain of the Townsend Wagon Train

== Geography ==
Virginia City is located in central Madison County. Montana Highway 287 passes through town, leading east 14 miles (23 km) to Ennis and northwest 28 miles (45 km) to Twin Bridges. The town sits in Alder Gulch, between the Tobacco Root Mountains to the north and the Gravelly Range to the south.

According to the U.S. Census Bureau, the town has a total area of 0.95 square miles (2.46 km^{2}), all land. Via Alder Gulch, the town is in the watershed of the Ruby River, which flows northwest to the Beaverhead River and the Jefferson River.

=== Climate ===
According to the Köppen Climate Classification system, Virginia City has a borderline cool semi-arid climate (Köppen BSk) bordering on a humid continental climate (Dfb). The data below are from the Western Regional Climate Center over the years 1893 to 2016.

Climate data for Virginia City, Montana (1991–2020 normals, extremes 1893–present)
Month	Jan	Feb	Mar	Apr	May	Jun	Jul	Aug	Sep	Oct	Nov	Dec	Year
Record high °F (°C)	65 (18)	64 (18)	71 (22)	81 (27)	91 (33)	100 (38)	103 (39)	98 (37)	99 (37)	85 (29)	74 (23)	63 (17)	103 (39)
Mean daily maximum °F (°C)	36.9 (2.7)	38.9 (3.8)	47.2 (8.4)	54.3 (12.4)	64.2 (17.9)	72.6 (22.6)	82.6 (28.1)	81.3 (27.4)	71.4 (21.9)	57.6 (14.2)	43.8 (6.6)	35.3 (1.8)	57.2 (14.0)
Daily mean °F (°C)	26.0 (−3.3)	27.1 (−2.7)	34.7 (1.5)	41.4 (5.2)	50.4 (10.2)	57.9 (14.4)	66.2 (19.0)	64.9 (18.3)	56.3 (13.5)	44.5 (6.9)	32.6 (0.3)	24.6 (−4.1)	43.9 (6.6)
Mean daily minimum °F (°C)	15.0 (−9.4)	15.4 (−9.2)	22.1 (−5.5)	28.5 (−1.9)	36.6 (2.6)	43.1 (6.2)	49.8 (9.9)	48.6 (9.2)	41.2 (5.1)	31.4 (−0.3)	21.3 (−5.9)	13.9 (−10.1)	30.6 (−0.8)
Record low °F (°C)	−40 (−40)	−39 (−39)	−22 (−30)	−11 (−24)	12 (−11)	23 (−5)	27 (−3)	24 (−4)	8 (−13)	−10 (−23)	−25 (−32)	−38 (−39)	−40 (−40)
Average precipitation inches (mm)	0.67 (17)	0.59 (15)	0.93 (24)	1.75 (44)	2.37 (60)	2.74 (70)	1.33 (34)	1.14 (29)	1.19 (30)	1.35 (34)	0.82 (21)	0.77 (20)	15.65 (398)
Average snowfall inches (cm)	11.2 (28)	8.0 (20)	6.6 (17)	10.7 (27)	4.3 (11)	0.2 (0.51)	0.0 (0.0)	0.0 (0.0)	0.2 (0.51)	3.6 (9.1)	7.7 (20)	12.2 (31)	64.7 (164)
Average precipitation days (≥ 0.01 in)	5.9	5.7	6.4	9.7	11.4	11.7	7.6	8.2	6.3	6.7	6.5	6.8	92.9
Average snowy days (≥ 0.1 in)	5.5	4.9	4.0	3.9	1.8	0.2	0.0	0.0	0.1	1.7	5.1	6.1	33.3
Source: NOAA

== Demographics ==
Historical population
Census	Pop.	Note	%±
1880	624		—
1890	675		8.2%
1900	568		−15.9%
1910	467		−17.8%
1920	342		−26.8%
1930	242		−29.2%
1940	380		57.0%
1950	323		−15.0%
1960	194		−39.9%
1970	149		−23.2%
1980	192		28.9%
1990	142		−26.0%
2000	130		−8.5%
2010	190		46.2%
2020	219		15.3%
U.S. Decennial Census

=== 2010 census ===
As of the census of 2010, there were 190 people, 102 households, and 55 families residing in the town. The population density was 200.0 inhabitants per square mile (77.2/km^{2}). There were 171 housing units at an average density of 180.0 per square mile (69.5/km^{2}). The racial makeup of the town was 91.6% White, 0.5% Asian, 0.5% from other races, and 7.4% from two or more races. Hispanic or Latino of any race were 1.6% of the population.

There were 102 households, of which 17.6% had children under the age of 18 living with them, 40.2% were married couples living together, 9.8% had a female householder with no husband present, 3.9% had a male householder with no wife present, and 46.1% were non-families. 42.2% of all households were made up of individuals, and 11.8% had someone living alone who was 65 years of age or older. The average household size was 1.86 and the average family size was 2.49.

The median age in the town was 51.3 years. 15.3% of residents were under the age of 18; 3.6% were between the ages of 18 and 24; 23.1% were from 25 to 44; 39.6% were from 45 to 64; and 18.4% were 65 years of age or older. The gender makeup of the town was 49.5% male and 50.5% female.

=== 2000 census ===
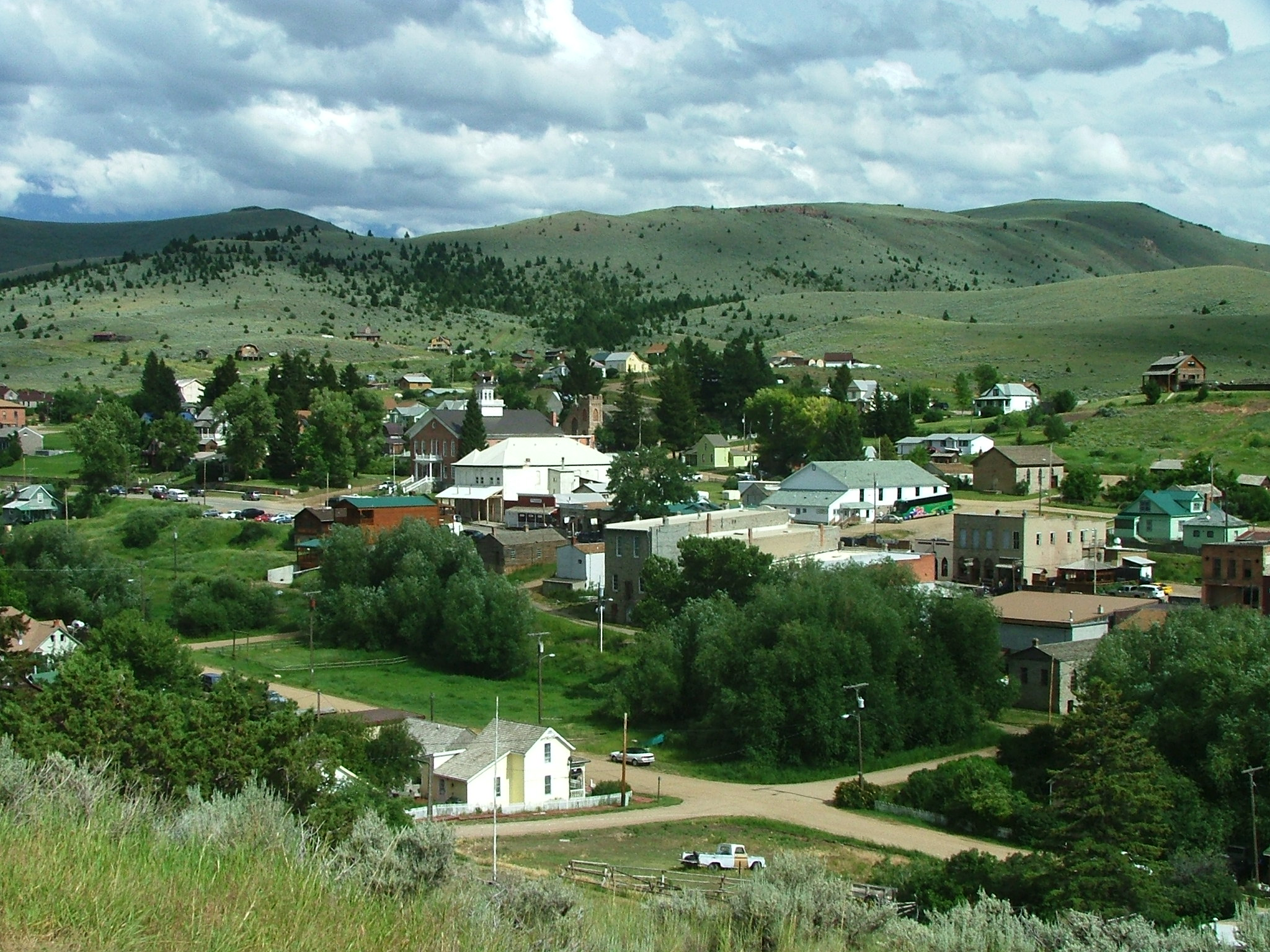
Aerial view of Virginia City from Boot Hill, July 2004

As of the census of 2000, there were 130 people, 72 households, and 32 families residing in the town. The population density was 140.4 inhabitants per square mile (54.2/km^{2}). There were 122 housing units at an average density of 131.7 per square mile (50.8/km^{2}). The racial makeup of the town was 94.62% White, 2.31% Native American, 0.77% from other races, and 2.31% from two or more races. Hispanic or Latino of any race were 0.77% of the population.

There were 72 households, out of which 18.1% had children under the age of 18 living with them, 40.3% were married couples living together, 1.4% had a female householder with no husband present, and 54.2% were non-families. 47.2% of all households were made up of individuals, and 15.3% had someone living alone who was 65 years of age or older. The average household size was 1.81 and the average family size was 2.52.

In the town, the population was spread out, with 14.6% under the age of 18, 0.8% from 18 to 24, 23.8% from 25 to 44, 46.9% from 45 to 64, and 13.8% who were 65 years of age or older. The median age was 48 years. For every 100 females, there were 106.3 males. For every 100 females age 18 and over, there were 117.6 males.

The median income for a household in the town was $30,000, and the median income for a family was $46,250. Males had a median income of $37,500 versus $19,167 for females. The per capita income for the town was $19,182. There are 5.7% of the population living below the poverty line, including those under eighteens and over 64.

== Education ==
It is in the Ennis K-12 Schools school district.

Thompson-Hickman County Library is a public library located in Virginia City.
