= Sarah Bickford =

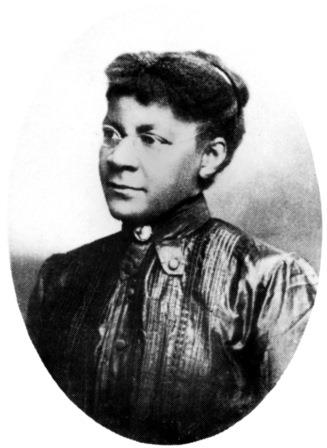
- Sarah Bickford
- Born: December 25, 1856; Jonesboro, Tennessee or possibly North Carolina, US
- Died: July 19, 1931 (aged 74); Virginia City, Montana, US
- Other names: Sarah Gammon, Sarah Brown
- Occupation: Utility owner
- Known for: First woman in Montana and probably the first African-American woman in the United States to own a utility company

Sarah Gammon Brown Bickford (December 25, 1856 – July 19, 1931) was born into slavery in either Tennessee or North Carolina. In the 1870s she made her way to the Montana goldfields, trading work as a nanny for transportation. She ultimately became sole owner of the Virginia City Water Company, becoming the first and only woman in Montana—and probably the nation's only female African American—to own a utility. In 2012, the State of Montana honored her by inducting her into the Gallery of Outstanding Montanans.

== Childhood ==
Other than being born into slavery, Sarah Bickford's origins are uncertain. Although some sources point to her birth in North Carolina, other historians have traced Bickford's birth to Jonesborough, Tennessee, to a mother owned by John Blair III. Blair made a fortune in the 1849 California Gold Rush and was active in politics, serving as both a state senator and a U.S. Congressman. In 1860, he owned a hotel in Knoxville, where Sarah (also known as Sallie) likely worked. Blair died in 1863; settling his estate is likely the reason that Sarah was separated from her family. Bickford told people that her parents were sold during the Civil War and that she never saw them again.

After the Civil War, Sarah went to live with her aunt, Nancy Gammon, in Knoxville, and Gammon's husband, Isaac, who became the first African American alderman in Knoxville. Sarah took their last name, becoming Sarah Gammon.

== Life in Virginia City ==
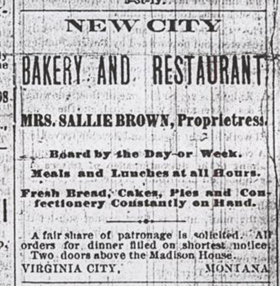
Advertisement for Sarah Bickford's (then Sarah Brown's) restaurant/bakery/boarding house

In 1871, Sarah Gammon headed to Montana Territory, trading passage for work as a nanny for John Luttrell Murphy. After arriving in the gold rush town of Virginia City (then the territorial capital), she worked briefly as a chambermaid at the Madison Hotel before marrying miner John Brown in 1872. The couple had three children (two boys and a girl), but the marriage was an unhappy one. Both boys died of diphtheria and in 1880, Sarah sued for divorce on the grounds of abuse and abandonment. She received full custody of her seven-year-old daughter Eva.

After working briefly for French-Canadian immigrant Adaline Laurin, Sarah Gammon Brown opened her own business, the New City Bakery and Restaurant, regularly advertising in the local newspaper, the Madisonian. According to the advertisement, "Mrs. Sallie Brown, proprietess," offered "board by the day or week," "lunch and dinner at all hours," "fresh bread, cake, pies and confectionery constantly on hand."

Eva Brown, Sarah's daughter, died at age 11 in 1882. A year later Sarah Brown married white miner and farmer Stephen Eben Bickford. This marriage occurred before the state of Montana passed a law prohibiting interracial marriage in 1909. Other prominent interracial couples from the same era included the founders of the coal mining town of Belt, Montana, John and Mattie Castner.

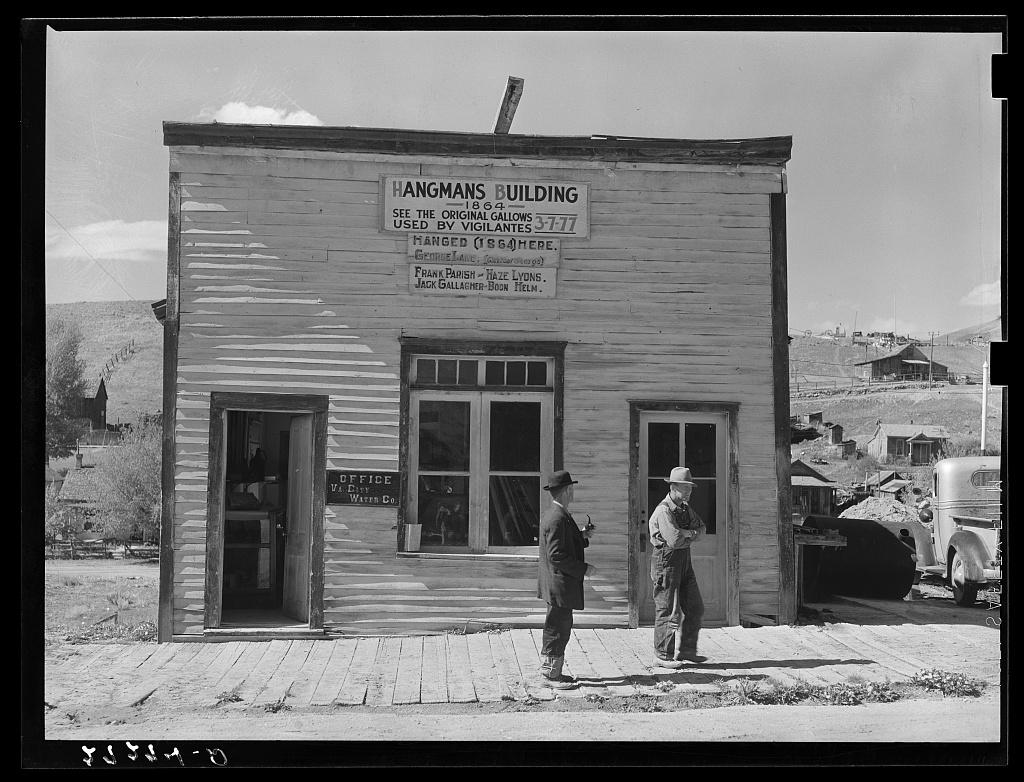
The "Hangman' building, owned by Bickford in the 1900s. Image taken in 1939.

Stephen Bickford died in 1890, leaving Sarah with four children (three girls and a boy) and two-thirds ownership in the Virginia City Waterworks. Sarah took an active role in the business; she took a business class by correspondence and in 1890, she purchased the remaining third of the waterworks, becoming sole proprietor. She also purchased a building (known as the Hangman's Building because during its construction, Vigilantes hung five men they judged to be outlaws from the roof beam) for her office. Bickford was a hands-on manager. She visited every customer and was her own bill collector. She remained a well-respected member of the community until her death on July 19, 1931.
