= Forestvale Cemetery =

Historic cemetery in Helena, Montana, US

- U.S. National Register of Historic Places
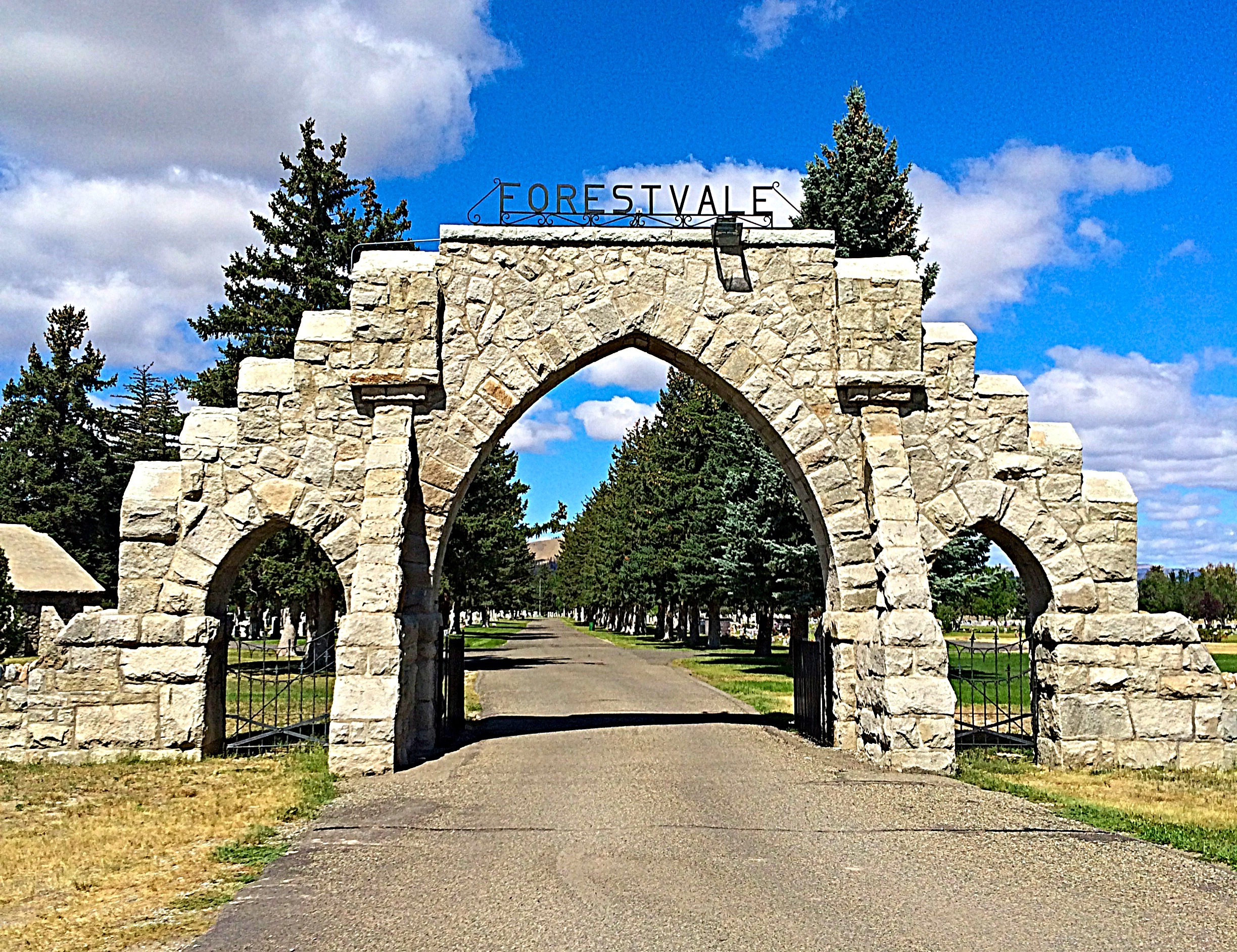
- The arched stone entrance in 2015

- Location within Montana Location within the United States
- Location: 490 Forestvale Road, Helena, Montana
- Coordinates: 46°39′23″N 112°02′13″W
- Area: 113 acres (46 ha)
- Built: 1890
- Architect: Harry V. Wheeler
- NRHP reference No.: 90000145
- Added to NRHP: February 21, 1990

Forestvale Cemetery (also known as Forest Vale Cemetery) is an historic cemetery in Helena, Montana. It was established in 1890 for the Helena Cemetery Association and laid out by Harry V. Wheeler. The arched stone entrance was built in 1890. Among almost 15,000 gravestones there is a mausoleum, the original property included a house for the sexton. The cemetery has been listed on the National Register of Historic Places since February 21, 1990.

Notable burials include Montana Governors Forrest H. Anderson (1913–1989), Tim Babcock (1919–2015), Sam C. Ford (1882–1961), Samuel T. Hauser (1833–1914), Benjamin F. Potts (1836–1887), and Sam V. Stewart (1872–1939). Other notables include businessman Charles Arthur Broadwater [1840–1892), painter Ralph E. DeCamp (1858–1936), pioneer James Fergus (1813–1902), Kentucky Governor Preston H. Leslie (1819–1907), actress Myrna Loy (1905–1993), US Senator Wilbur F. Sanders (1834–1905), and rodeo cowgirl Fannie Sperry Steele (1887–1983).
