= Junior Furnace, Ohio =

Unincorporated community in Ohio, U.S.

Coordinates: 38°37′23″N 82°48′33″W

Junior Furnace is an unincorporated community in Scioto County, in the U.S. state of Ohio.

== History ==
The community's namesake Junior Furnace was a blast furnace built in 1828; the name was prefixed "Junior" because the property was two years younger than nearby Franklin Furnace.

== Notable person ==
Thomas H. Carter, a United States Senator from Montana, was born at Junior Furnace in 1854.
