= The Pacific Monthly =

Magazine published in Portland, Oregon, United States, 1898–1911

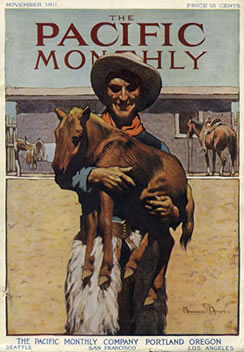
- The Pacific Monthly from November 1911. Cover illustration by Maynard Dixon.
- Categories: Politics; culture; literature; opinion; culture
- Frequency: Monthly
- First issue: 1898
- Final issue: 1911
- Country: United States
- Language: English

The Pacific Monthly was a magazine of politics, culture, literature, and opinion, published in Portland, Oregon, United States from 1898 to 1911, when it was purchased by Southern Pacific Railroad and merged with its magazine, Sunset. Sunset still carries the subtitle "The Pacific Monthly."

The magazine earned praise from a number of contemporaneous publications, both locally and from as far as the east coast, for the quality of its literary content, as well as details like paper quality and illustrations. In a 1905 book, it was described as the "badly needed" "great Western magazine." During its years as an independent publication, The Pacific Monthly's most frequent contributor was Charles Erskine Scott Wood. From 1905 to 1911 Portland journalist Fred Lockley was general manager and frequent writer. Other contributors included Leo Tolstoy, George Sterling, Joaquin Miller, Sinclair Lewis, and Jack London, whose novel Martin Eden first appeared in serialized form in the magazine.
