= Wilbur F. Sanders =

American politician

Wilbur Fisk Sanders
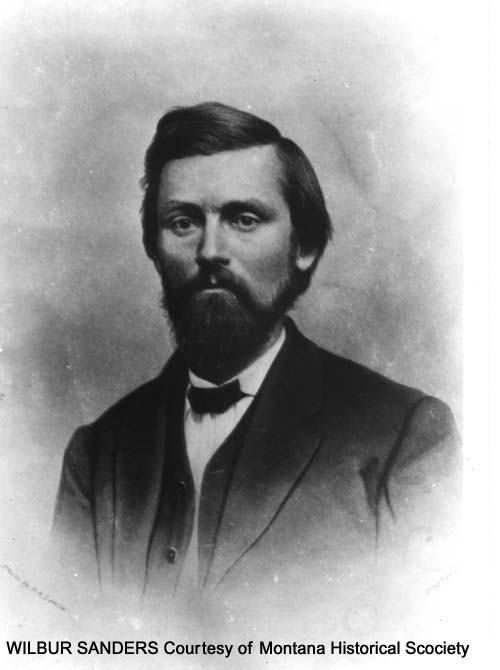
- Wilbur Fisk Sanders, Senator of Montana. He was the prosectuting lawyer for the Vigilantes against the "Road Agents" in Virginia City, Montana.

United States Senator from Montana
- In office January 1, 1890 – March 3, 1893
- Preceded by: None
- Succeeded by: Lee Mantle

Personal details
- Born: Wilbur Fisk Sanders; May 2, 1834 Leon, New York, U.S.
- Died: July 7, 1905 (aged 71) Helena, Montana, U.S.
- Resting place: Forestvale Cemetery, Helena, Montana
- Party: Republican
- Spouse: Harriet P. Fenn
- Children: James, Wilbur E., and Louis
- Occupation: Lawyer, politician
- Profession: Law

Military service
- Years of service: 1861-1862
- Rank: First Lieutenant
- Unit: 64th Ohio Infantry
- Battles/wars: Battle of Shiloh

Wilbur Fisk Sanders (May 2, 1834 – July 7, 1905) was a United States senator from Montana. A leading pioneer and a skilled lawyer, Sanders played a prominent role in the development of Montana Territory and the state's early political history.

== Early life ==
Sanders was born in Leon, Cattaraugus County, New York, to Ira and Freedom (Edgerton) Sanders. His father was a farmer originally from Rhode Island, and his mother a native of Connecticut. Being a devout Methodist, Ira Sanders named his firstborn son after a hero of his faith, the founding president of Wesleyan University, Willbur Fisk (the name was often misspelled by his contemporaries with one "l," instead of two). Family stories tell of a precocious child displaying a keen intellect and studious character. Wilbur attended the common schools in New York and afterward taught school himself.

Following his mother's wishes, Sanders moved to Akron, Ohio, in 1854, where he continued teaching and studied law under his uncle, Sidney Edgerton. His Uncle Sidney, 16 years his elder, exercised a profound impact on his life. Also born in western New York, Edgerton had moved to Akron ten years earlier and rose to prominence under the tutelage of the veteran Ohio politician and lawyer Rufus P. Spalding. Edgerton likewise took Sanders under his wing. Sanders gained admission to the bar in 1856, and he and Edgerton soon entered a law partnership. Edgerton had become involved with the Free Soil Party in the 1840s, and by the mid-1850s, around the time Sanders joined him in Akron when his political activities had shifted to the fledgling Republican Party. Sanders followed his uncle's political development.

On October 27, 1858, Sanders married Harriet P. Fenn, a native of Ohio. They had five children, but only three survived into adulthood: James, Wilbur E., and Louis.

== Civil War ==
During the Civil War, he recruited a company of infantry and a battery of artillery in the summer of 1861 and was commissioned a first lieutenant in the 64th Regiment, Ohio Infantry, of which he was made adjutant. Sanders served in the Battle of Shiloh, and later in 1862, he assisted in the construction of defenses along the railroads south of Nashville. His family reported that he resigned from the army in August 1862 following an illness aggravated by a wound. He returned to his family in Akron, Ohio.

== Montana Territory ==
He settled in that part of Idaho Territory, which later became Montana, where he engaged in the practice of law and also became interested in mining and stock raising. He was a young lawyer when he moved to Montana (Bannack) in 1863. He was there before courts were organized and, being one of the first permanent settlers, took a prominent part extralegal activities in the territory. He was a founder of the infamous Montana Vigilantes, using his position as a lawyer to cover for the gang's summary murders. In December 1863, Sanders led the prosecution of George Ives as the murderer of Nicolas Tiebolt in Nevada City, Montana. Ives was convicted and hanged on December 21, 1863. The George Ives trial initiated a period of vigilantism, extrajudicial killings orchestrated in part by Sanders that eventually brought an end to thefts and murders by "road agents" in the Virginia City region. Sanders was one of the five original organizers of the Alder Gulch Vigilance Committee, which was formed on December 23, 1863 in Virginia City, Montana. As a ringleader of the Vigilantes, Sanders was implicated in the mysterious 1867 death of acting territorial governor Thomas Francis Meagher, who had opposed vigilantism and its associated Freemasonry and Protestantism. Meagher was also a formidable political opponent well-positioned to outrun Sanders in any future bid for office once Montana was granted statehood.

In his career as an attorney, Sanders gained a reputation for representing minority defendants, including Chinese and Indians. In a sensational 1881 trial, Sanders led the defense for Ah Wah and Ah Yen, Chinese miners on trial for murder. Sanders argued reasonable doubt and lack of evidence, and the Montana Territorial Supreme Court acquitted the defendants.

In 1873, Sanders became a member of the Territorial Legislature. Also, he realized the importance of preserving early records and was for thirty years the president of the Montana Historical Society, established in 1865. He accumulated newspapers and documents in his law office. Sanders was a founding member of the Society of Montana Pioneers and served as its secretary (1884) and president (1888).

He unsuccessfully ran as a Republican candidate for the US House of Representatives in 1864, 1867, 1880, and 1886 and was a member of the Territorial House of Representatives of Montana from 1873 to 1879.

He was the first president of the board of trustees of Montana Wesleyan University, which opened in 1890 in Helena.

== State of Montana ==
Upon the admission of Montana as a State into the Union, he was elected as a Republican to the US Senate and served from January 1, 1890, to March 3, 1893. While in the Senate, he was the chairman of the Committee on Enrolled Bills in the Fifty-second Congress.

In the 1890s, Sanders represented the Chinese community in Butte, Montana, against labor unions boycotting Chinese businesses.

Sanders died in Helena, Montana, at 71, and was interred in Forestvale Cemetery there. Sanders County, Montana, is named in his honor.

== Notes ==
U.S. Senate
Preceded by None	U.S. senator (Class 1) from Montana; 1890–1893; Served alongside: Thomas C. Power	Succeeded by Lee Mantle
