= 1889 Montana gubernatorial election =

- October 1, 1889
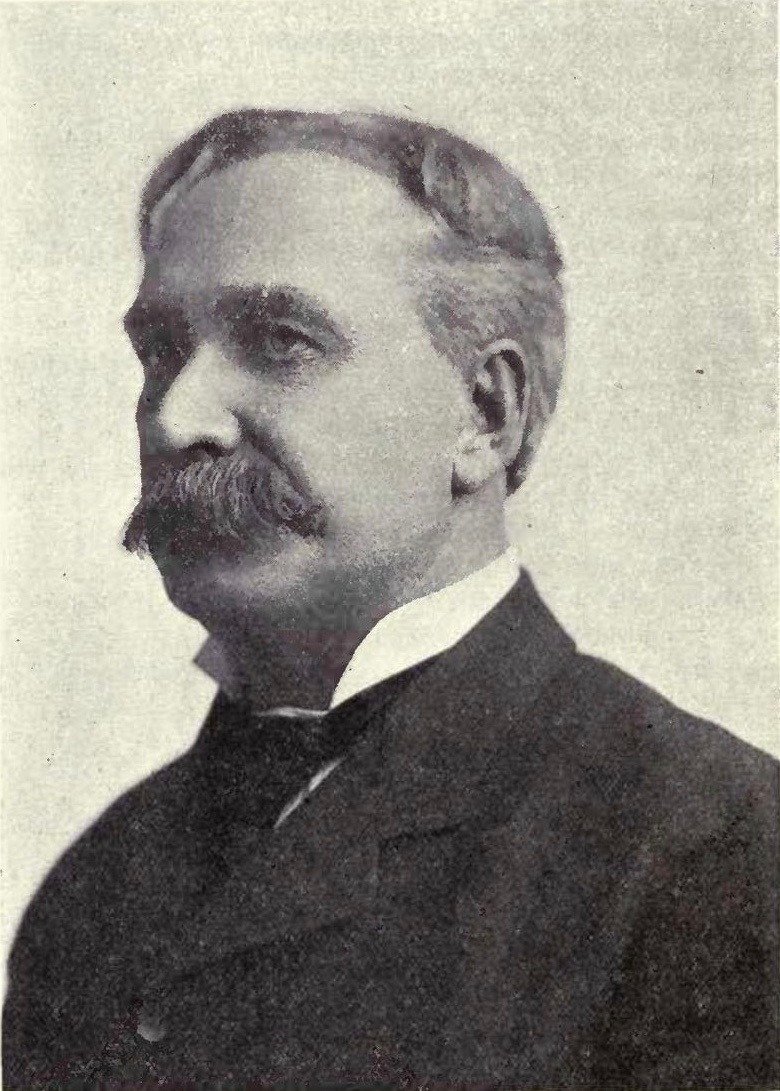

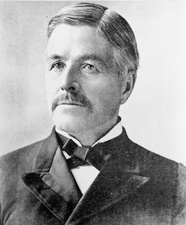
Nominee	Joseph Toole	Thomas C. Power
Party	Democratic	Republican
Popular vote	19,735	18,991
Percentage	50.96%	49.04%
County results
Toole
50–60%
Power
50–60%
No data
Governor of Montana Territory before election
Benjamin White
Republican
Governor of Montana
after election
Joseph Toole
Democratic

The 1889 Montana gubernatorial election took place on October 1, 1889. This was the first gubernatorial election in Montana. Democratic candidate Joseph Toole narrowly beat Republican candidate Thomas C. Power. Toole was the only Democrat elected for Montana's six executive offices. Toole was sworn in on November 8, 1889, and his term ended January 2, 1893.

Toole would be elected again in 1900 and 1904. He resigned near the end of his third term due to ill health. He is the longest served Governor of Montana, at 11 years, and the only Governor elected to nonconsecutive terms. Power would be elected United States Senator by the Montana Legislature after statehood.

== General election ==
=== Results ===
Montana gubernatorial election, 1889
Party	Candidate	Votes	%	±%
Democratic	Joseph Toole	19,735	50.96%	+50.96%
Republican	Thomas C. Power	18,991	49.04%	+49.04%
Majority		744	1.92%	
Turnout		38,726		
Democratic hold		Swing		
