= Montana State Capitol =

State capitol building of the U.S. state of Montana

Coordinates: 46.5857°N 112.0184°W

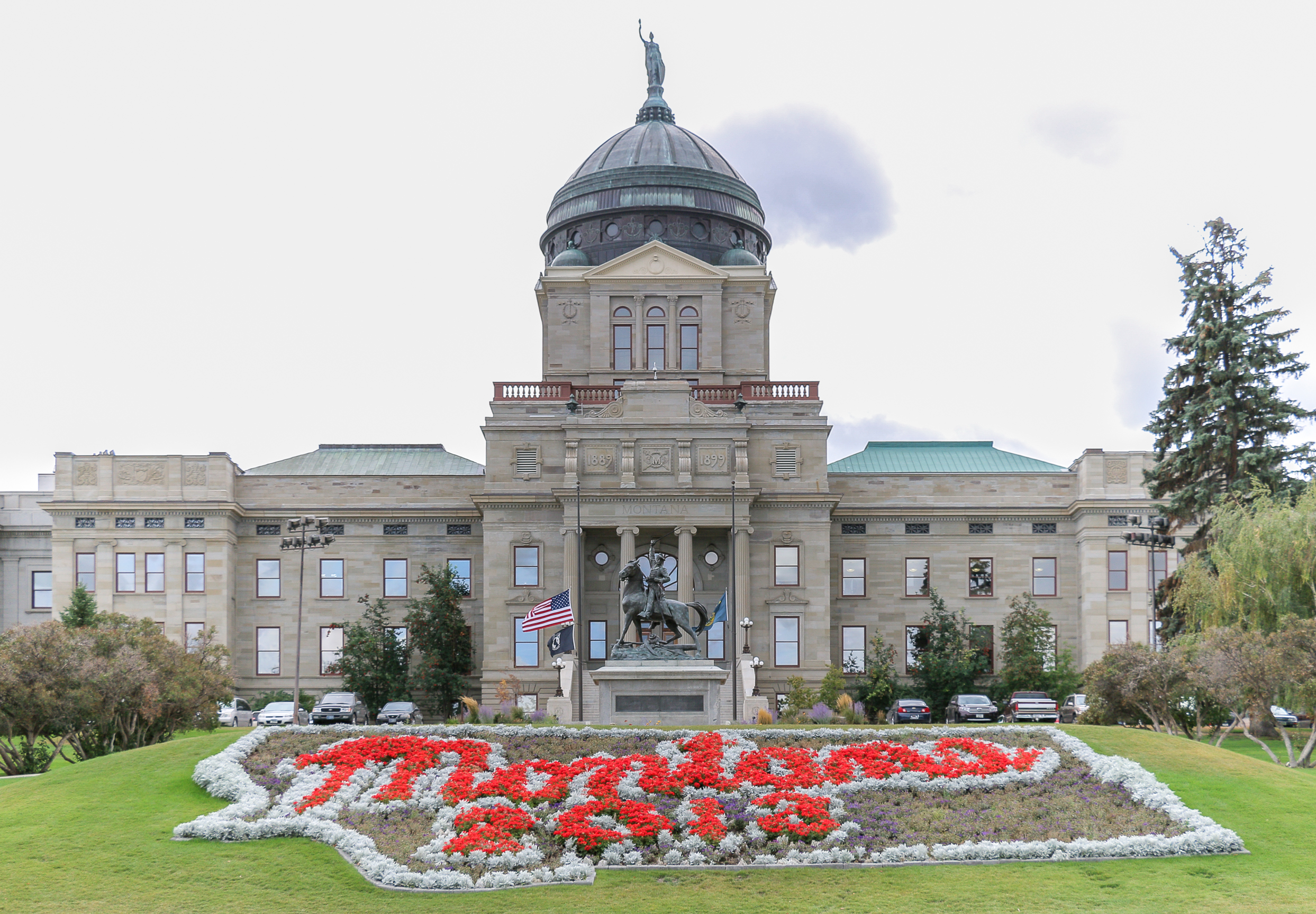
- Interactive map of the Montana State Capitol area

General information
- Architectural style: Neoclassical Renaissance Revival (interior)
- Location: Helena, Montana, United States
- Construction started: 1899; 127 years ago
- Completed: 1902; 124 years ago
- Cost: US$540,000
- Client: State of Montana

Design and construction
- Architects: Bell & Kent; Link & Haire; F. M. Andrews & Company

The Montana State Capitol is the structure in the U.S. state of Montana that houses the Montana State Legislature, the offices of the Governor, Lieutenant Governor, and Secretary of State and support staff. It is located in the capital city of Helena at 1301 East Sixth Avenue. The building was constructed between 1896 and 1902 and enlarged with two wings added between 1909 and 1912.

== History ==
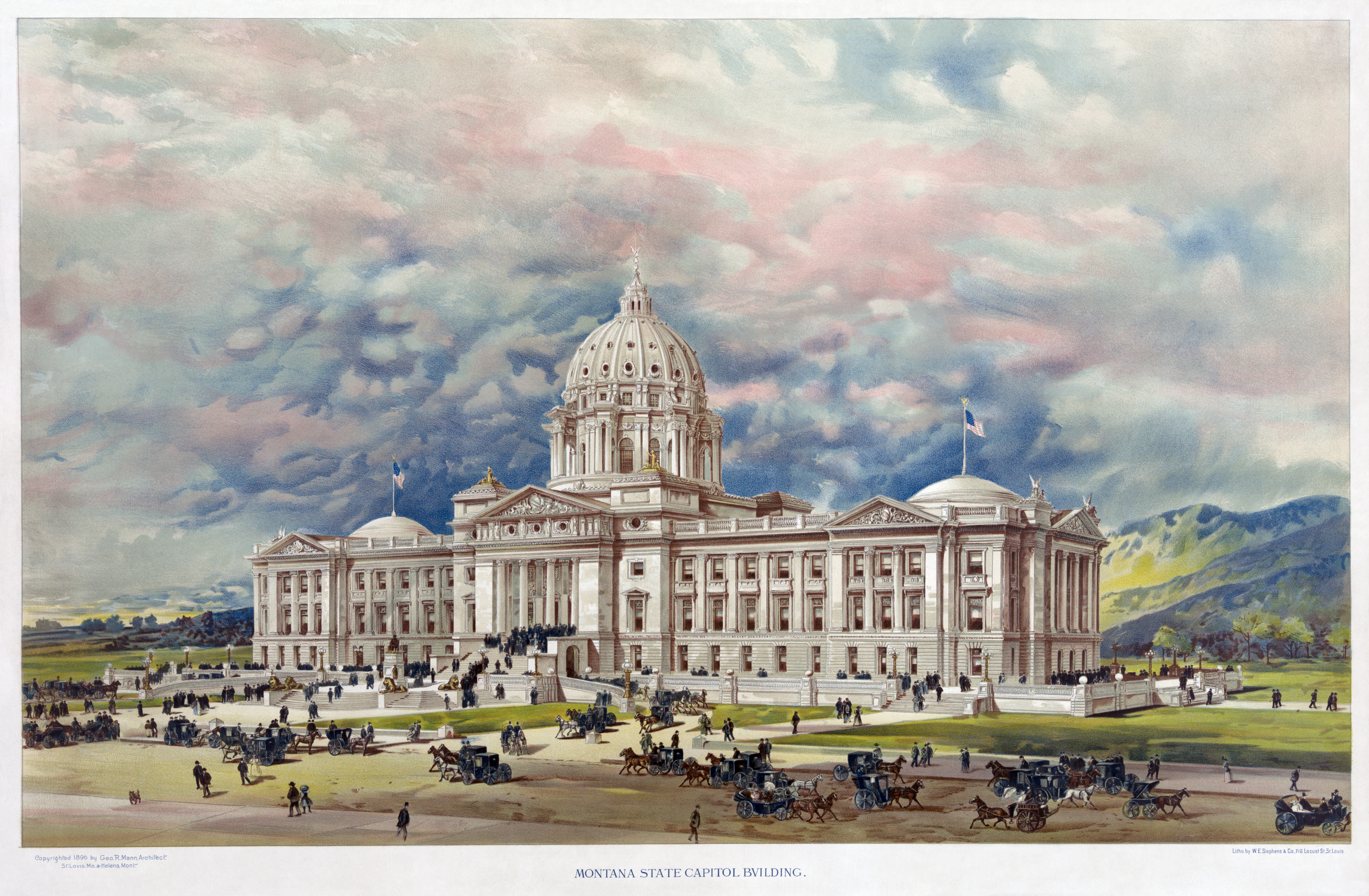
Winning competition design for the Montana State Capitol by George R. Mann, 1896 (unbuilt)

A design competition for the building was conducted in 1896. The commission selected a design by George R. Mann as the winner. In 1897, after it was found that the Commission was planning to scam money from the building project, it was disbanded and a second Capitol Commission was convened. The new Commission abandoned Mann's plan as being too costly, and had a second design competition, won by Charles Emlen Bell and John Hackett Kent, of Bell & Kent of Council Bluffs, Iowa. In order to have their design built, Bell & Kent relocated their office to Helena.

While Mann's building was never built in Montana, it was selected later as the basic design for the Arkansas State Capitol.

The winning design by Bell & Kent had been altered already during the construction phase, when in 1901 the commission asked for the structure to be made more imposing by increasing the height of the dome. Kent opposed the changes, as his original low spherical dome was meant to be "pure Greek", but Bell advocated the commission's request.

Between 1909 and 1912, the building was extended by the addition of two new wings on the eastern and western sides. This work was executed by Link & Haire, architects of Butte, with F. M. Andrews & Company of New York City as consulting architects.

== Architecture ==
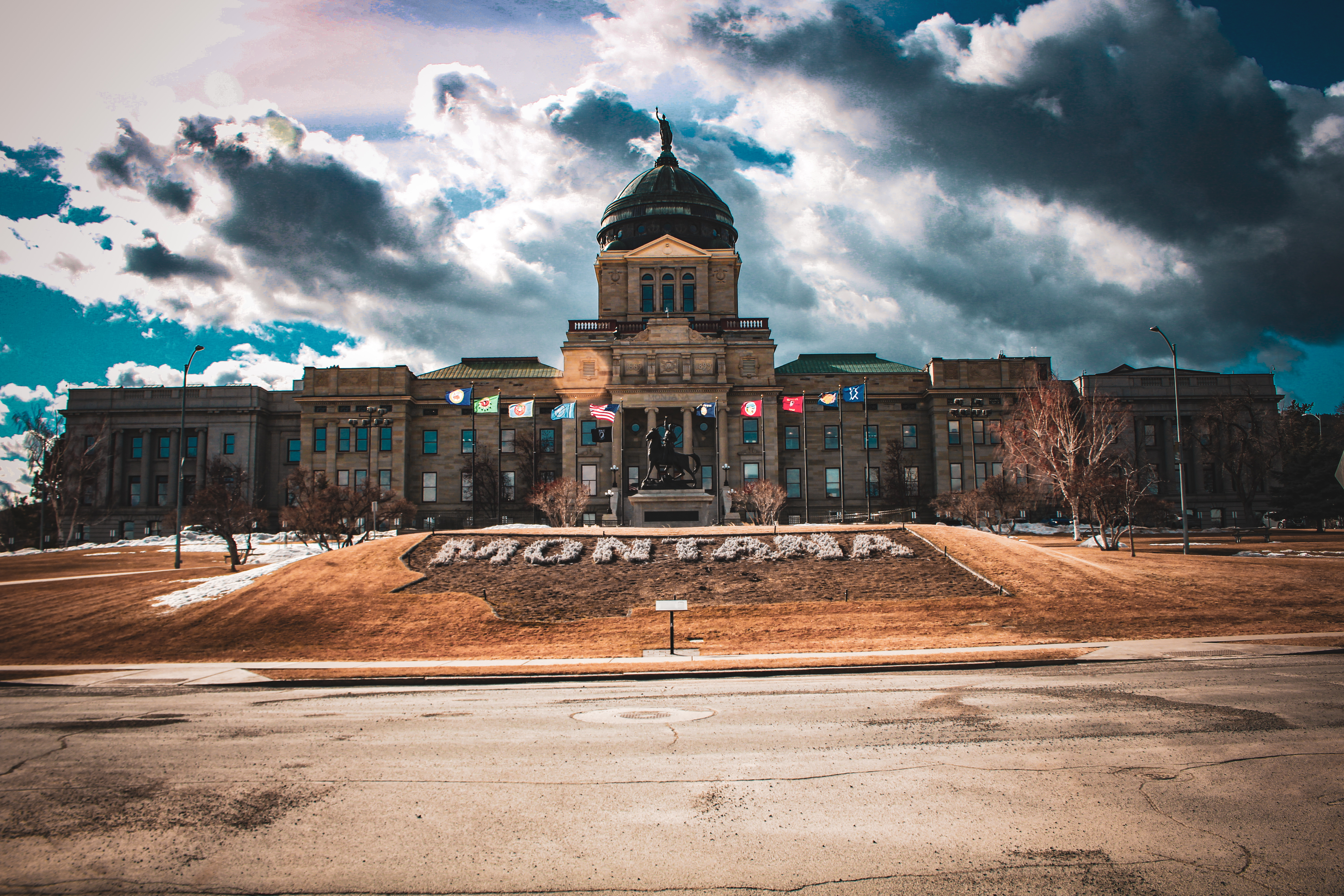
Photo of the Montana State Capitol.

The building, constructed of Montana sandstone and granite, is in Greek neoclassical architectural style, and is listed on the National Register of Historic Places. The exterior of the dome is covered with copper. Atop the dome is a feminine statue affectionately dubbed Montana.

The Montana statue, known as Lady Liberty until 2006 sits atop the Capitol dome.

The statue was removed in August 2026 as part of restoration work on the structure that began in June. It will be assessed and repaired before it is returned to its base.

== Art ==
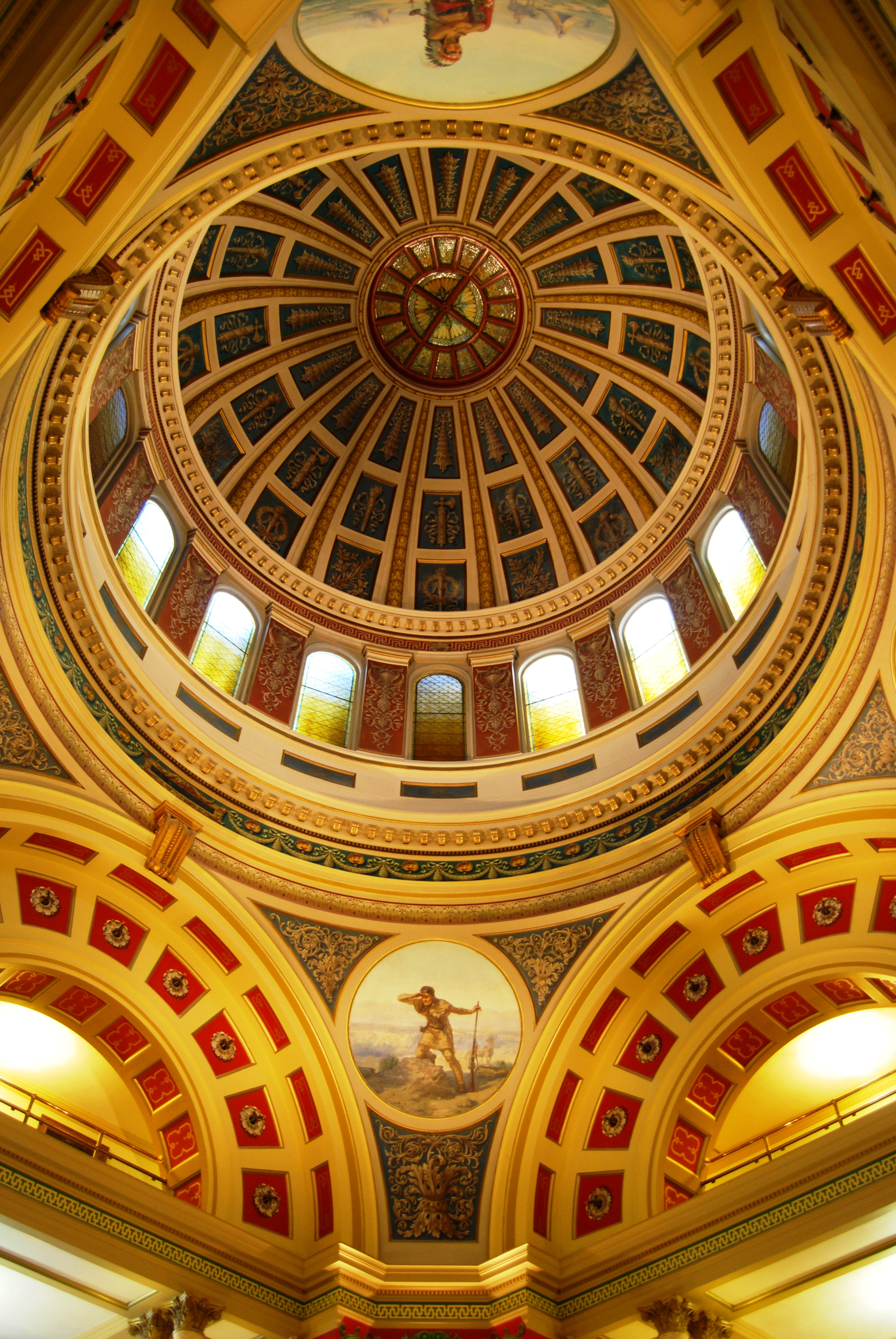
Interior view of the dome

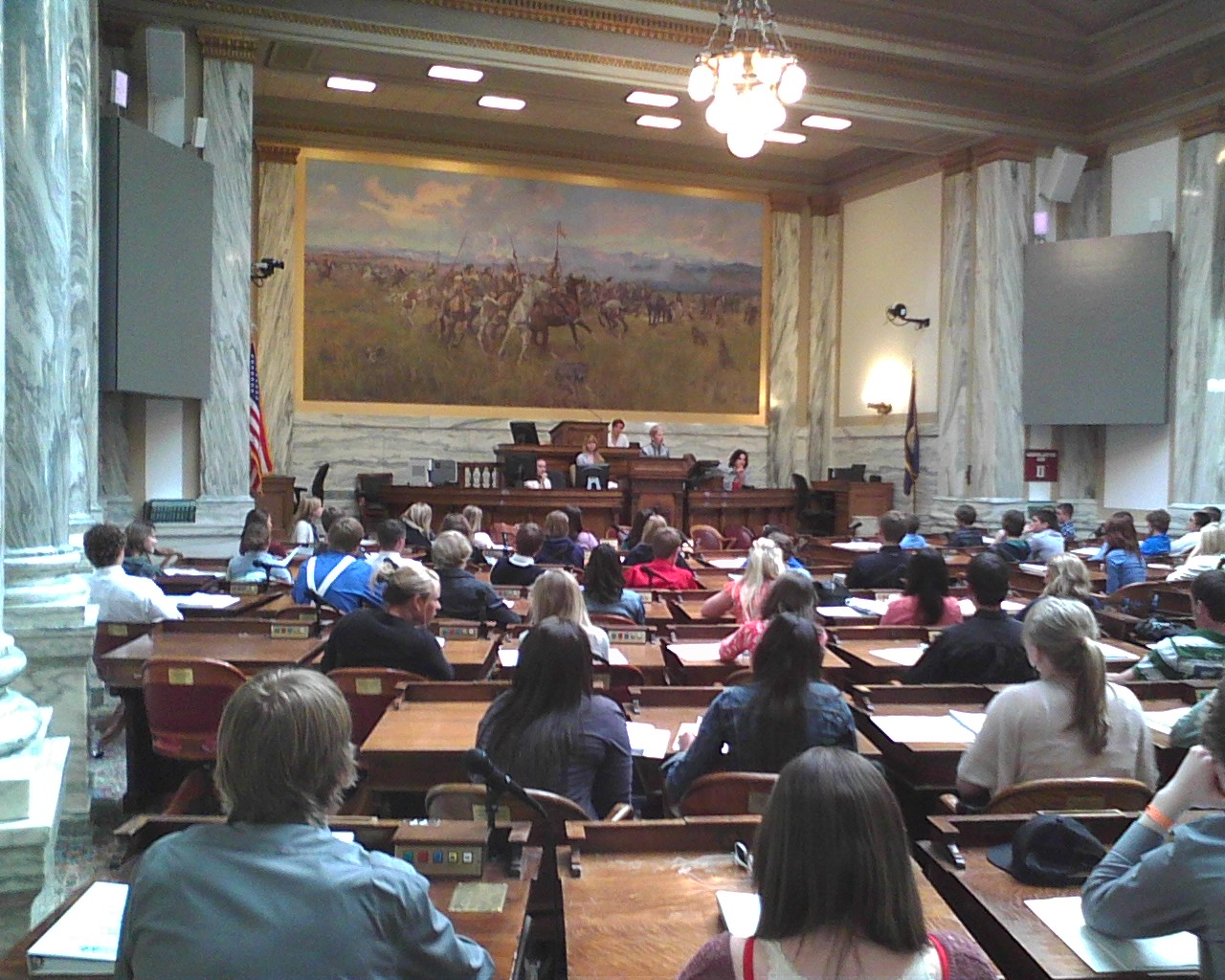
Lewis and Clark Meeting the Flathead Indians at Ross' Hole, by Charles M. Russell, 1912, Montana House of Representatives Chamber

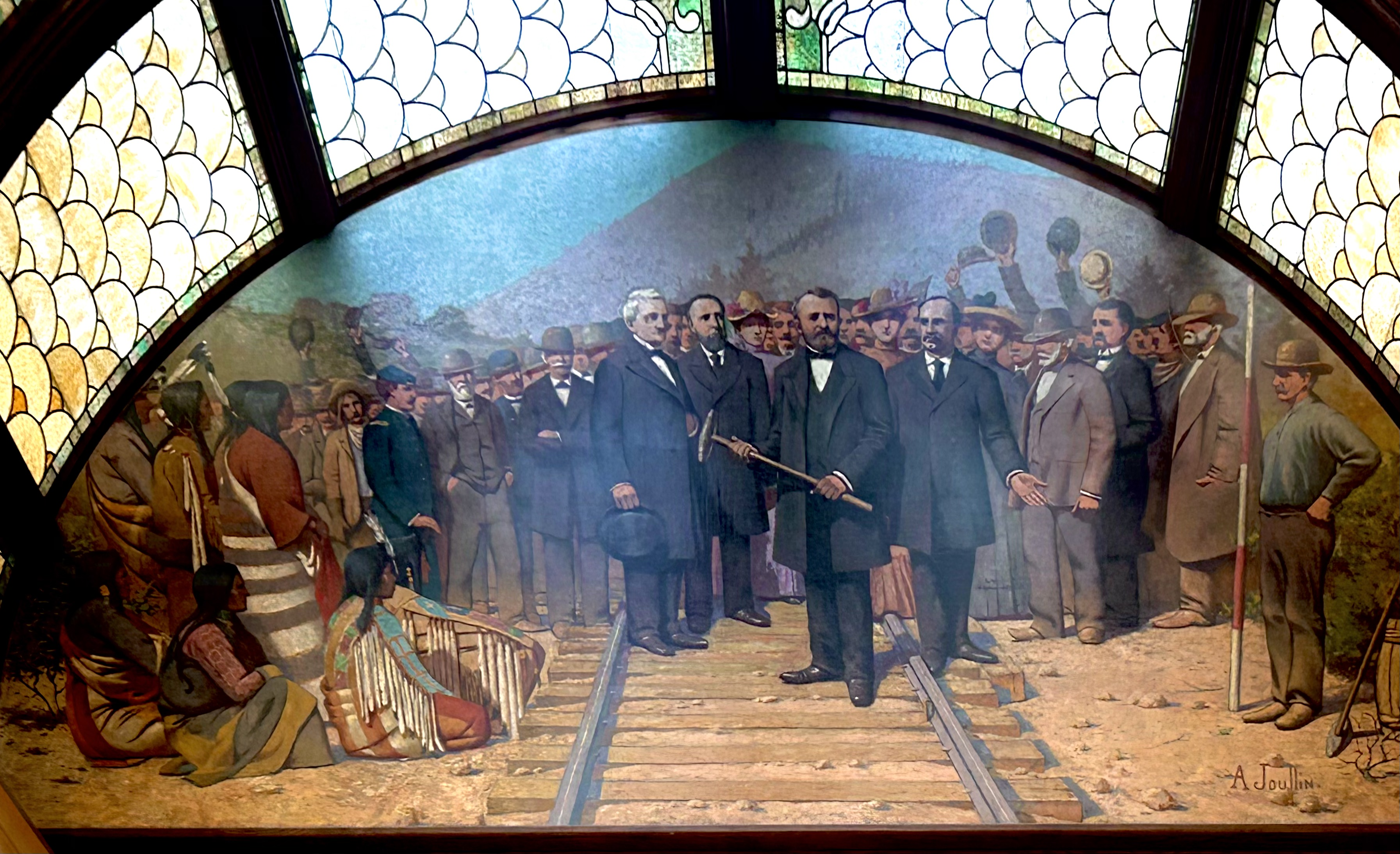
Amédée Joullin, Driving the Golden Spike, 1903. Grand Staircase

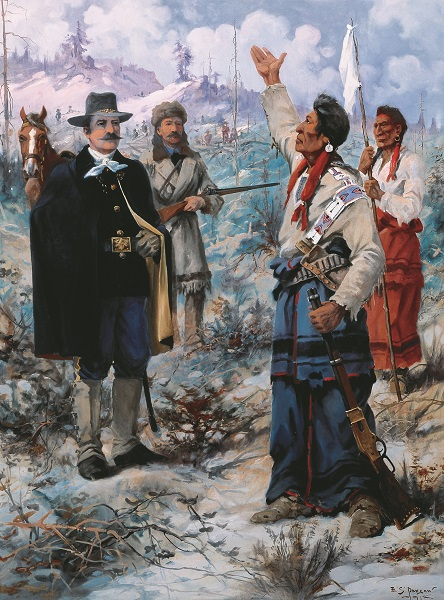
Surrender of Chief Joseph by Edgar S. Paxson, House lobby

The most notable feature inside the center of the Capitol building is the massive rotunda, with four circular paintings on the pendentives. These paintings, painted for the Capitol opening in 1902 by the firm of F. Pedretti's Sons, depict four important archetypes of people of Montana's early history: a Native American (intended to be of Chief Charlo), an explorer and fur trapper (Jim Bridger), a gold miner (Henry Finnis Edgar, one of the discoverers of gold at Alder Gulch), and a cowboy (unidentified, but said to be inspired by the works of C.M. Russell). The Pendretti brothers provided additional commissioned artwork in the Senate and Old Supreme Court Chambers.

The southern arch of the rotunda features the semi-elliptical painting Driving The Golden Spike, painted by Amédée Joullin. The former State Law Library, now a set of committee rooms, features ten Montana landscapes created by Ralph E. DeCamp. The House of Representatives Lobby features six scenes depicting significant events in early Montana history by Edgar S. Paxson.

The most significant piece of art in the Capitol is by Montana's famous Western artist Charles M. Russell. The 1912 painting, titled Lewis and Clark Meeting the Flathead Indians at Ross' Hole, is 25 feet (7.6 m) long and twelve feet high. It depicts the explorers Lewis and Clark meeting Montana's Bitterroot Salish people upon their return across the Bitterroot Mountains from the Pacific Ocean. It is now displayed above the Speaker's chair in the House of Representatives' chamber.

== See also ==
- Yule marble
- List of Montana state legislatures
- List of state and territorial capitols in the United States
