= William W. Dixon =

American politician (1838–1910)

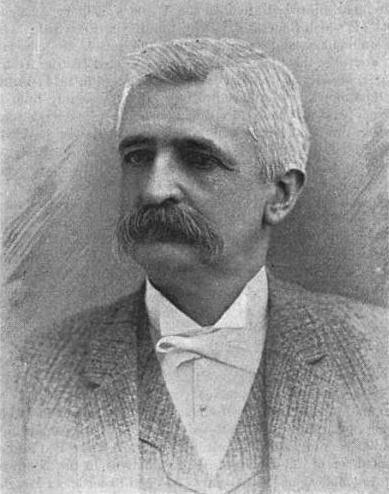

Member of the U.S. House of Representatives from Montana's at-large district
- In office March 4, 1891 – March 3, 1893
- Preceded by: Thomas H. Carter
- Succeeded by: Charles S. Hartman

Personal details
- Born: William Wirt Dixon; June 3, 1838 New York City, U.S.
- Died: November 13, 1910 (aged 72) Los Angeles, California, U.S.
- Resting place: Rock Creek Cemetery, Washington, D.C., U.S.
- Party: Democratic
- Occupation: Politician, lawyer

William Wirt Dixon (June 3, 1838 – November 13, 1910) was a U.S. representative from Montana.

Born in Brooklyn, New York, Dixon moved to Illinois in 1843 and to Keokuk, Iowa, in 1849. Dixon pursued preparatory studies and studied law in Keokuk, and was admitted to the bar in 1858. He moved to Tennessee in 1860, to Arkansas in the same year, to California in 1862, and then to Humboldt County, Nevada. In 1866, Dixon moved to Montana, residing in Helena and later in Deer Lodge until 1879. Dixon served as member of the Territorial house of representatives in 1871 and 1872. After spending two years in the Black Hills, Dixon returned to Montana in 1881, settling in Butte and engaging in legal practice. In 1884 and 1889, Dixon served as delegate to the constitutional conventions of Montana.

Dixon was elected as a Democrat to the Fifty-second Congress (March 4, 1891 – March 3, 1893). Dixon unsuccessfully ran for reelection to the Fifty-third Congress. Afterwards, he resumed his legal practice. Dixon was also a candidate for election to the United States Senate, but the legislature failed to make a choice.

Dixon died in Los Angeles, California, November 13, 1910, was interred in Calvary Cemetery, East Los Angeles, and later reinterred in Rock Creek Cemetery, Washington, D.C., March 15, 1911.

U.S. House of Representatives
Preceded by Thomas H. Carter	Member of the U.S. House of Representatives from Montana's At-large congressional district 1891–1893	Succeeded by Charles S. Hartman
