= Thomas C. Power =

American politician (1839–1923)

Thomas Charles Power
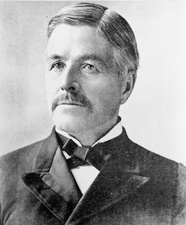

United States Senator from Montana
- In office January 2, 1890 – March 3, 1895
- Preceded by: None
- Succeeded by: Thomas H. Carter

Personal details
- Born: May 22, 1839 near Dubuque, Iowa
- Died: February 16, 1923 (aged 83) Helena, Montana
- Resting place: Resurrection Cemetery
- Party: Republican
- Profession: Businessman

Thomas Charles Power (May 22, 1839 – February 16, 1923) was a Republican senator from Montana and an American businessman.

== Early life, education, and career ==
Born near Dubuque, Iowa, on May 22, 1839, Power attended public school and graduated from Sinsinawa College with a degree in engineering. He then worked as a surveyor in Dakota until 1860, when he entered the employ of an engineering company. There, he participated in government land surveys covering much of Iowa and what was then the Dakota Territory. Between 1861 and 1867, he was primarily engaged in trade along the Mississippi River, eventually becoming president of a steamer line. Power first came to Montana in 1864, partnering in his enterprises with his brother, J.W. Power. After settling in Helena in 1876, Power started T. C. Power and Bro, which was a mercantile company through the northwestern United States and western Canada.

== Senate service and later life ==
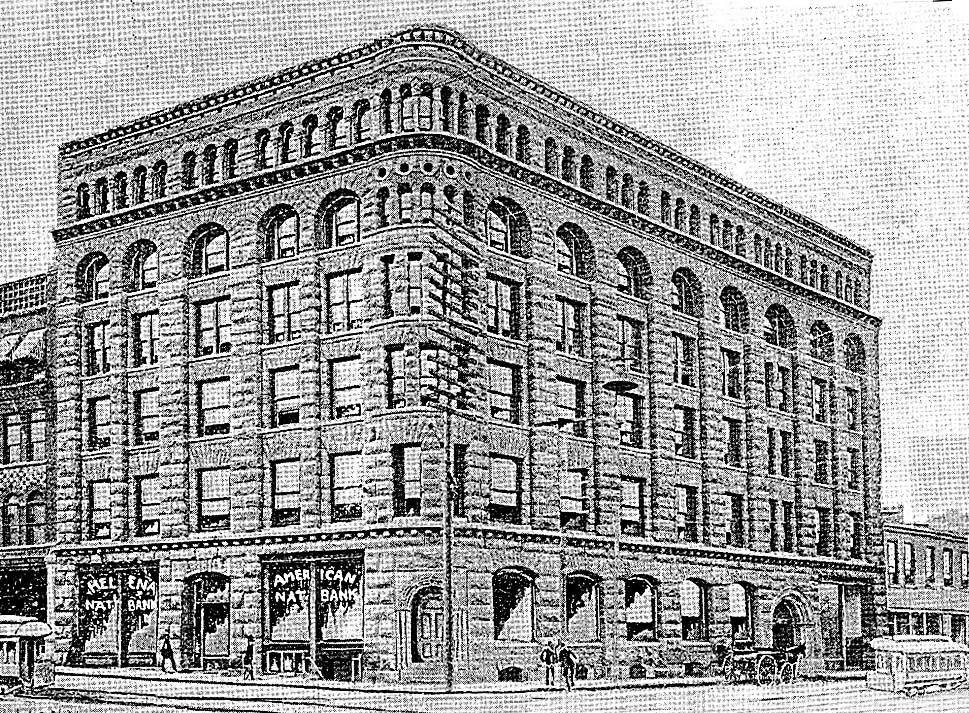
An 1891 image of the 1889 Power Building in Helena, now popularly referred to as "The Power Block".

In 1889, Power ran unsuccessfully for Governor of Montana, winning the nomination of the Republican Party on the first ballot, but losing the general election to Democratic candidate Joseph Toole, the only Democrat on the state ticket that year to be elected. A conflict erupted over the respective roles of the governor and the state legislature in appointing the first two members of the United States Senate for the state, but on January 2, 1890, the Republican-controlled legislature elected Power to the second seat, which he then held until March 3, 1895.

Power died at his home in Helena on February 16, 1923, and was interred in Resurrection Cemetery. The town of Power in Montana is named after him.

Party political offices
First	Republican nominee for Governor of Montana; 1889	Succeeded by John E. Rickards
U.S. Senate
Preceded by None	U.S. senator (Class 2) from Montana; 1890–1895; Served alongside: Wilbur F. Sanders, Lee Mantle	Succeeded by Thomas H. Carter
