= Fred Lockley =

American journalist (1871–1958)

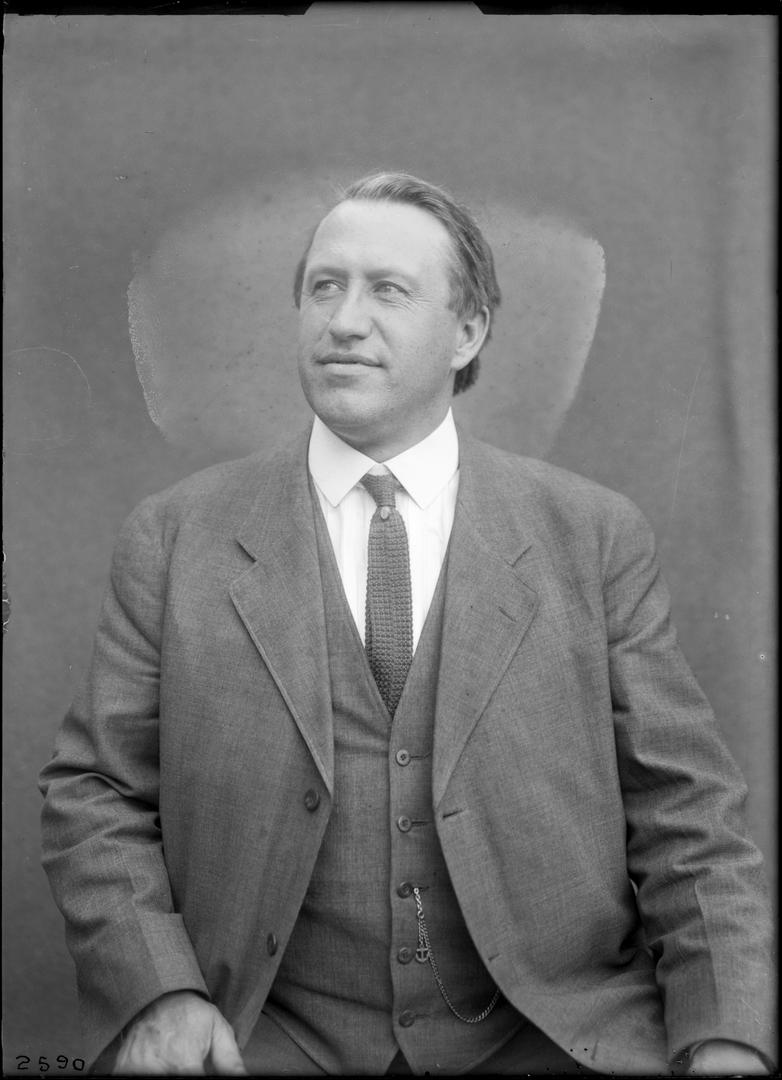
- Fred Lockley by Lee Moorhouse
- Born: March 19, 1871; Leavenworth, Kansas, U.S.
- Died: October 15, 1958 (aged 87)
- Education: Oregon Agricultural College; Willamette University
- Occupation: Journalist
- Spouses: Hope Gans (m. 1897; died 1928) Laura Simpson (m. 1930)
- Children: 3
- Parent(s): Frederic Lockley; Elizabeth Campbell

Fred Lockley (March 19, 1871 – October 15, 1958) was an American journalist best known for his editorial column for the Oregon Journal, "Impressions and Observations of a Journal Man", which appeared throughout the Western United States on a nearly daily basis. Lockley also authored many books which, like his articles, were largely about his travels and interviews with early settlers in the Willamette Valley. It was said that he interviewed "bullwhackers, muleskinners, pioneers, prospectors, 49ers, Indian fighters, trappers, ex-barkeepers, authors, preachers, poets and near-poets". He also interviewed Thomas Edison, Booker T. Washington, Ezra Meeker, Woodrow Wilson, Count Tolstoy, General Hugh Scott, Harry Houdini, and Jack London.

== Early life ==
Lockley was born in Leavenworth, Kansas to English immigrant, Civil War Veteran and newspaper editor Frederic Lockley and Elizabeth Campbell on March 19, 1871. The following year the family moved to Salt Lake City where, along with business partners George F. Prescott and A. M. Hamilton, Frederic Lockley bought and ran the Salt Lake City Tribune, working for seven years as the managing editor.

From there, the family took a wagon west to Walla Walla, Washington. Fred Lockley later wrote, "The odor of sagebrush today brings back vividly our evening campfires made of sagebrush, and the ever present coyotes with their mournful howl. Once more I can see the stagecoach sweep by with its four horses, traveling at full speed -- I can see too, the long lines of freight wagons and Indians. Here and there along the trail were the bleaching bones of oxen -- a grim reminder of the hardships of the Old Oregon Trail." One year later the family moved to Butte, Montana where Frederic became the first editor of the Butte Inter-Mountain. It was for the Inter-Mountain that young Fred Lockley got his start in the newspaper business, as a carrier for the paper.

After four years the family moved to what is now Oklahoma, then called the Cherokee Strip, settling on the Ponca reservation. There young Fred Lockley met Chief Joseph while the former chief of the Nez Perce was held as a prisoner of war.

From Oklahoma the family moved to Albany, New York as Fredric Lockley toured the eastern and mid-western United States as a lecturer. Fredric Lockley soon returned to the newspaper business, purchasing the Arkansas City Traveler. Here, young Fred continued his profession, working as an office boy and type sorter for his father.

== Career ==
In 1888, Fred Lockley moved to Salem, Oregon. He was hired by the Capital Journal as compositor by W. H. Byars, the surveyor general of Oregon from 1890 to 1894. Before long Byars began devoting a greater amount of time to his surveying and less to the paper, promoting Lockley to the position of business manager and editor for the paper. Lockley entered into the Oregon Agricultural College, now Oregon State University, from 1889 to 1890, and later received a degree in education from Willamette University in 1895.

For a year Lockley worked on a farm in Polk County, Oregon followed by work writing for the Salem Statesman and as field editor for Pacific Homestead. This took him on horseback across the Pacific Northwest, where he crossed paths with farmers, miners, hunters and pioneers. During these trips Lockley began gathering stories and writing articles on pioneer men and women. Lockley also worked for the federal government in the following years, assisting in geological surveys in what is now Glacier National Park. He then worked as a carrier for the Salem post office, and by 1900 made his way to Nome, Alaska. In Nome Lockley worked as a miner and also for the local Nome Nugget. While in Nome, with the help of Ben Taylor, who had also worked for the Salem post office, Lockley established the first free mail delivery to Nome.

Upon the urging of his wife, Lockley moved to Pendleton, Oregon, in 1901, where he bought a 25% interest in the Daily East Oregonian. After four years he left to become general manager of the magazine The Pacific Monthly, which merged with Sunset in 1911 when the magazine was bought by the Southern Pacific Railroad. Lockley moved to the publication that would make his reputation, the Oregon Journal, in Portland, Oregon.

It was while writing for the Oregon Journal that Lockley began his nearly daily column, "Thoughts and Observations of a Journal Man", or as it was shortened for his nickname, "The Journal Man". He spent a short time as a World War I correspondent for the Oregon Journal, New York Herald, and the London Globe, during which time he also built huts and dig trenches for the combined Allied forces, sometimes under heavy fire,. He filed 347 war articles.

While Lockley wrote for the Oregon Journal for several years, his output tapered off as he spent more time on his books and with his family. His books included Oregon Folks, Oregon's Yesterdays, Oregon Trail Blazers, Across the Plains by Prairie Schooner, Vigilante Days in Virginia City, and Vigilante Days in Carson City.

== Family and death ==
On June 16, 1897, Fred Lockley married his first wife, Hope Gans. It was Hope who convinced Fred to leave the government postal work and invest in the Daily East Oregonian. They had three children. Frederic Llewellyn and Hope both died in their youth. Lawrence Campbell Lockley lived to fight in World War I and graduate from the University of California, with a doctorate from Harvard. He went on to teach at the University of Southern California and Santa Clara University.

In 1928, Hope Gans Lockley died and was buried at the Lone Fir Cemetery in Portland, Oregon, next to their daughter. Two years later Lockley married Laura Simpson. Fred Lockley died October 15, 1958. After Lockley's death Mike Helm, an Oregon native and author, compiled portions of Lockley's extensive unpublished notebooks into several new books including Conversations with Pioneer Men and Conversations with Pioneer Women. These collections are used as primary reference on Oregon history and pioneers of the Northwest.
