= Lee Mantle =

American politician (1851–1934)

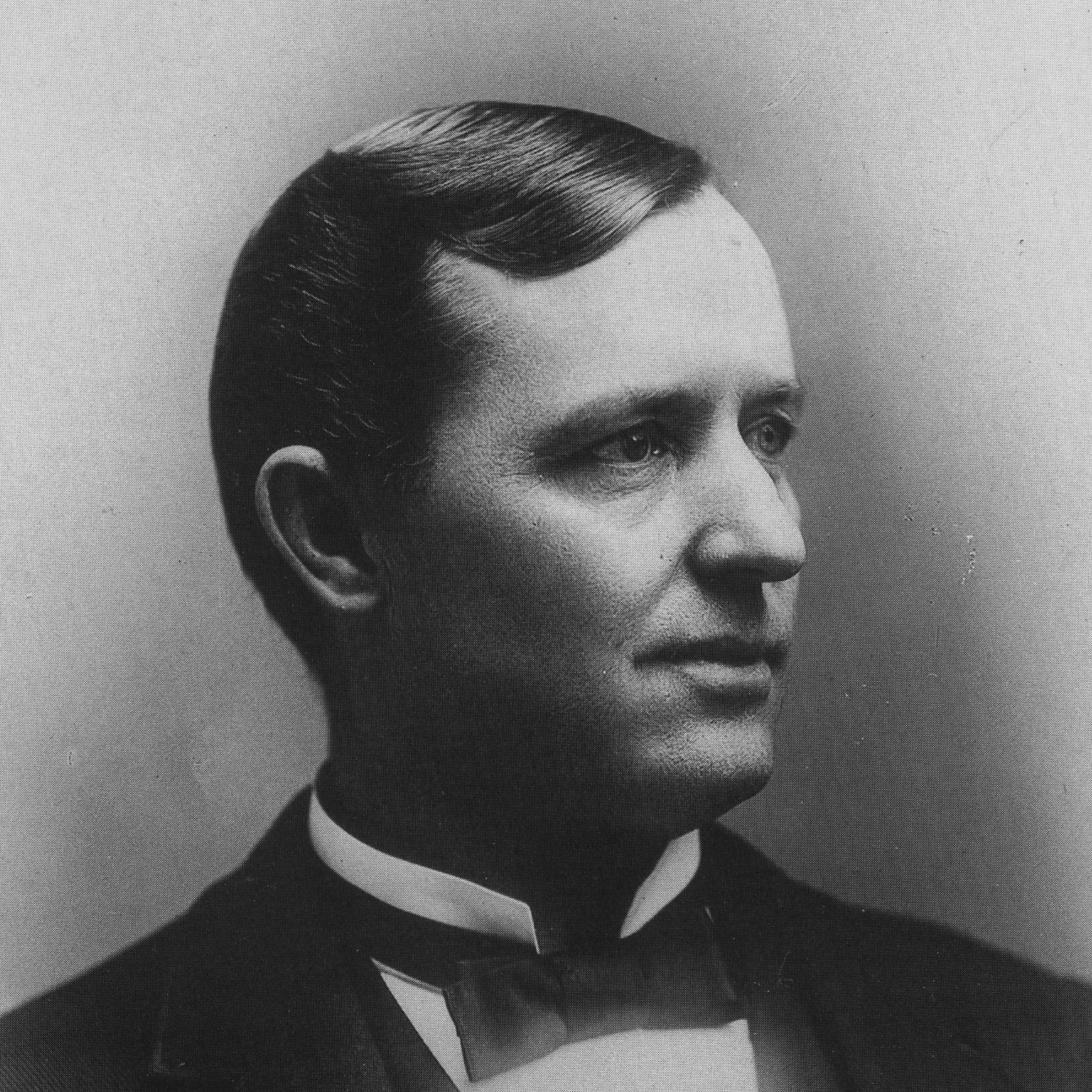

United States Senator from Montana
- In office January 16, 1895 – March 3, 1899
- Preceded by: Wilbur F. Sanders
- Succeeded by: William A. Clark

Mayor of Butte, Montana
- In office 1892–1893
- Preceded by: Henry J. Mueller
- Succeeded by: Eugene O. Dugan

Speaker of the Montana Territory House of Representatives
- In office 1889–1889
- Preceded by: F. K. Armstrong
- Succeeded by: Charles P. Blakely (As Speaker of the Montana House of Representatives)

Member of the Montana Territory House of Representatives from Silver Bow County
- In office 1889–1889 Serving with E. Congdon, W. H. Roberts
- Preceded by: C. W. Hanscom, William Thompson
- Succeeded by: L. T. Schmidt, J. K. Clark, F. T. Courtney, J. A. Hogan, H. L. Frank, W. J. Penrose, J. W. Gilligan, A. M. Day, A. M. Dusseault, W. Thompson (As members of the Montana House of Representatives)
- In office 1887–1889 Serving with C. W. Hanscom, William Thompson
- Preceded by: J. T. Baldwin, John F. Forbis, W. O. Speer
- Succeeded by: Lee Mantle, E. Congdon, W. H. Roberts
- In office 1883–1885 Serving with John F. Forbis, Daniel O'Grady
- Preceded by: John M. Bell, Israel Clem, Stephen DeWolfe, C. B. Houser, R. G. Humber, J. K. Pardee (from Deer Lodge County
- Succeeded by: J. T. Baldwin, John F. Forbis, W. O. Speer

Personal details
- Born: Theophilus Washington Mantle; December 13, 1851 Birmingham, England
- Died: November 18, 1934 (aged 82) Los Angeles, California
- Resting place: Mount Moriah Cemetery, Butte, Montana
- Party: Republican
- Other political affiliations: Silver Republican (1896–1900)
- Spouse: Etta Daly (M. 1922–1934, his death)
- Children: 1
- Occupation: Newspaper publisher Businessman

Lee Mantle (December 13, 1851 – November 18, 1934) was an English-born American businessman and politician from Montana. A Republican, he was most notable for his service as a United States Senator from 1895 to 1899.

Mantle was born in Birmingham, England on December 13, 1851. His father died before Mantle was born, and his mother converted to Mormonism and immigrated to the United States with her children. The family settled in Salt Lake City in 1864. Upon observing that Mormons were practicing polygamy, Mantle's mother decided she had been deceived by the church missionaries who had recruited her, and the Mantles renounced the LDS Church.

Mantle attended a village school and moved to Idaho Territory in 1870, where he was a telegraph operator and stage agent for Western Union. He moved to Butte, Montana in 1877 and became agent of the Wells-Fargo Express Co. Mantle was one of the organizers of Butte as a city, and in 1880 served on its first board of aldermen. In 1881, he established the Daily Inter Mountain, the first Republican newspaper in Western Montana. He was elected to the Territorial house of representatives in 1882, 1886, and 1888, and served as speaker in 1889. He was mayor of Butte from 1892 to 1893.

In 1893, Mantle was appointed to the U.S. Senate to fill the vacancy for the term beginning on commencing March 4. He was not seated because the Senate determined that the governor did not have the power to make an appointment while the legislature was in session. He was later elected by the legislature, and he served from January 16, 1895, to March 3, 1899. In 1896, Mantle joined the Silver Republican Party and served as its chairman in Montana. He was an unsuccessful candidate for the U.S. Senate nomination in 1899, and returned to the Republican Party in 1900.

Mantle was publisher of the Inter Mountain until 1901 and became wealthy through investments and ownership stakes in real estate, mines, insurance, and other ventures. In 1921, he moved to California. A bachelor until 1922, at age 70 he married a 25-year-old woman he had known since she was a child. They were married until his death, and were the parents of a son. Mantle died Los Angeles, California on November 18, 1934. He was interred at Mount Moriah Cemetery in Butte.

== Early life ==
Theophilus Washington Mantle, usually known as Lee Mantle, was born in Birmingham, England on December 13, 1851, a son of Joseph Mantle and Mary Susan (Patrick) Mantle. His father died before he was born, and support of the family fell to Mantle's mother. A convert to Mormonism, in 1864 she brought her family of four boys and three girls to the United States, and they settled in Salt Lake City. After deciding that the Mormon missionaries who had recruited her had not been truthful with respect to the church's practice of polygamy, the Mantles renounced their affiliation.

Lee Mantle attended local schools and was "placed out" to work for his room and board beginning at age 10. He worked for several years as a cattle herder and farm laborer, earning $50 (about $1,025 in 2020) a year for his family in addition to his food and shelter. At age 16 he obtained a job with the Union Pacific Railroad, which employed him as a teamster to haul ties and other supplies and equipment. After the Union Pacific and Central Pacific completed the first First transcontinental railroad at Promontory Point, Utah in 1869, Mantle walked to Malad City, Idaho (about 125 miles). In Malad City, Mantle was hired by Benjamin F. White to drive an ox team and wagon at White's saltworks.

After two years at the saltworks, in 1872 Mantle arranged to learn telegraphy from an experienced operator, who agreed to train him on the condition that Mantle maintain the Western Union line along the Central Pacific tracks between Green River, Utah and Ogden, Utah during the winter months. In 1873, Mantle was assigned as a telegrapher at the Western Union office on the stagecoach line between Corinne, Utah and Helena, Montana. A year later, he purchased the station near Haskell Pass in Flathead County, Montana. Mantle was the Western Union telegraph operator and postmaster, and also purchased an interest in a toll road through Monida Pass.

In 1877, Mantle sold his Haskell Pass businesses and moved to Butte, Montana, where he was employed as telegrapher by Wells Fargo & Company and also started the city's first insurance brokerage. Entering politics as a Republican, Mantle was one of the leaders of the effort to incorporate Butte as a city. The effort was successful, and in 1880, Mantle was elected to Butte's first board of aldermen.

== Continued career ==
In 1881, Mantle started the Daily Inter Mountain, the first Republican newspaper in Western Montana. Through the paper's editorial stance, Mantle became a Republican leader and largely shaped the party's organization and policies in Montana. He was elected to the legislature of Montana Territory in 1882. When John Schuyler Crosby left the territorial governorship in 1884, Mantle was the candidate of Western Montana to replace him, but Eastern Montana Republicans prevailed in obtaining the appointment for B. Platt Carpenter. Mantle was a delegate to the 1884 Republican National Convention, and supported George F. Edmunds for president. In 1886, Mantle was elected to a second term in the Territorial House.

When the Northern Pacific Railway attempted to obtain large grants of land in Montana from the federal government, Mantle was chosen president of the Mineral Land Association, the citizens' group formed to oppose the Northern Pacific. The association's lobbying and legal efforts proved successful, and the NP did not acquire the land it sought. In 1888, Mantle was again elected to the legislature, the territory's last, and he was chosen to serve as Speaker of the House. When Montana was admitted to the Union in 1890, Mantle was a candidate for the U.S. Senate, and narrowly lost in the legislature's Republican caucus to Wilbur F. Sanders and Thomas C. Power, who were elected.

In 1890 and 1892, Mantle was chairman of Montana's state Republican convention. In 1892 he was elected chairman of the state Republican executive committee. He was also elected mayor of Butte in 1892, and he served one term. When Sanders' U.S. Senate term expired in 1893, the Montana Legislature was unable to agree on a successor. Governor John E. Rickards appointed Mantle to fill the vacancy, but the Senate refused to seat him on the grounds that the governor could not make an appointment while the legislature was in session. Also in 1893, Mantle was named chairman of the state commission that organized Montana's participation at the World's Columbian Exposition in Chicago.

== United States Senator ==
Sanders' seat remained vacant until January 1895, when the legislature elected Mantle as his successor. He served one partial term, January 16, 1895, to March 3, 1899. In the Senate, Mantle served on the Finance Committee, where he worked to obtain passage of amendments to the Dingley Act tariff which were favored by the National Wool Growers Association.

Mantle was also an advocate of the Free silver movement, which many Montana miners favored in the belief that it would make their holdings more valuable. As a result of this view, in 1896, Mantle joined the Silver Republican Party and became its chairman in Montana. He was an unsuccessful candidate for reelection to the Senate in 1899. In 1900, he returned to the Republican Party.

Another Mantle cause in the Senate was protecting Montana timber interests. In 1897, outgoing President Grover Cleveland withdrew six million acres of forest land from the public domain to be set aside as a timber reserve. In Mantle's view, this move threatened Montana's mining interests, which depended on timber when opening and expanding mines. He also viewed Cleveland's move as a threat to Montana logging companies, since removing the land from public domain prevented them from harvesting trees for production of wood and paper products. After William McKinley succeeded Cleveland, he reduced the size of the timber reserve by more than 700,000 acres.

== Later life ==
After leaving the Senate, Mantle resumed his business interests. With partner Charles S. Warren, he held ownership stakes in the Silver Bow Electric Company, commercial real estate, mines, insurance companies, and publishing houses. He was a noted civic activist, and his memberships included the Masons, Elks, Knights of Pythias, and the Rocky Mountain Club of New York City.

In 1901, Mantle was again a candidate for the U.S. Senate. Both seats were up for election, and former Senator William A. Clark was chosen for one. Mantle was a major candidate for the other, but after the legislature was deadlocked for over a month, Republican legislators decided to back Thomas H. Carter, who lost to Democrat Paris Gibson.

In 1902, Mantle was a delegate to the state Republican convention, and he was chairman of the state party's 1904 convention. He was also a delegate to the 1904 Republican National Convention, which unanimously nominated Theodore Roosevelt for a full term as president and Charles W. Fairbanks for vice president. He declined the party's nomination for governor in 1904, but accepted election as the state Republican Party chairman. In that fall's election, his efforts led Republicans to victory in the down-ballot statewide races, but Democrats won the governorship and lieutenant governorship.

In 1902, the Montana Legislature named Mantle to the commission responsible for the state's participation in the 1904 Louisiana Purchase Exposition in St. Louis and 1905 Lewis and Clark Centennial Exposition in Portland, Oregon. The commission chose Mantle to serve as its president, and he was responsible for creation and management of Montana's exhibits at both events.

In 1905, Mantle was a candidate for the Republican U.S. Senate nomination, but lost to Thomas H. Carter, who was reelected. In 1907, he was a candidate for the Republican nomination for U.S. senator. He lost to Joseph M. Dixon, who went on to win the seat.

In 1921, Mantle moved to San Francisco, California. After his marriage, he relocated to Los Angeles. Mantle died in Los Angeles on November 18, 1934. He was buried at Mount Moriah Cemetery in Butte.

== Family ==
Mantle remained a bachelor until 1922. At age 70, he made national headlines when he married Etta Daly (1897–1993), a 25-year-old he had known since she was a child. They remained married until his death and were the parents of a son, Lee Mantle Jr. (1922–1985).

== See also ==
- List of United States senators who switched parties
- List of United States senators born outside the United States

U.S. Senate
| Preceded by Wilbur F. Sanders | U.S. senator (Class 1) from Montana; January 16, 1895 – March 3, 1899; Served alongside: Thomas C. Power, Thomas H. Carter | Succeeded by William A. Clark |
Honorary titles
| Preceded by Henry Hansbrough | Most senior living U.S. senator (Sitting or former); November 16, 1933 – November 18, 1934 | Succeeded by Marion Butler |
