= Helen M. Duncan =

American paleontologist (1910–1971)

- Born: May 3, 1910; Medford, Oregon
- Died: August 14, 1971 (aged 61); Virginia City, Montana
- Education: University of Montana
- Occupations: geologist, paleontologist

Helen Margaret Duncan (May 3, 1910 – August 14, 1971) was a geologist and paleontologist with the United States Geological Survey from 1945 to 1971, where she worked in the Paleontology and Stratigraphy Branch. Duncan was considered one of the strongest women in the Cincinnati geology department; her contributions to the Lipalian Research Foundation and the Pick and Hammer shows were additional work of her time. Duncan paved the path for many geology scholars to follow with her discoveries on fossil records and her studies in paleontology and stratigraphy.

== Early life ==
In 1910, Duncan was born in Medford, Oregon and grew up near Virginia City, Montana. Despite being born in Medford, she considered Virginia City to be her home. Not much is known about Duncan’s family, as she kept her family affairs fairly private. Duncan gained an interest in geology because of Professor Charles F. Diess.

== Education ==
During Duncan's time as a student, she worked as a librarian and an instructor at her university. With her main interest in geology, Duncan instituted at the University of Montana to receive her bachelor's degree in 1934. After a few years, in 1937, she accomplished her master's degree from the same institution. Along with the success of achieving her master's degree, the University of Michigan decided to publish Duncan's master's thesis, Trepostomata Bryozoa from the Traverse Group of Michigan. Duncan wrote about her observations and intensive research on Bryozoans. Duncan's work remarkably contributed to geology. It was appraised as a "classic in its field" and helped others identify various types of fossil corals through her fossil descriptions. From 1939 to 1941, Duncan also attended the University of Cincinnati and held an assistant position in the geology department. Additionally, before joining the United States Geological Survey (USGS) to work on military projects, she switched to the applied science research division in 1942 as an assistant.

== Career ==
Duncan began with the U.S. Geological Survey (USGS) as an editor in 1942 before becoming a geologist in 1945. While working with the USGS during World War II, she worked on a wartime fluorspar project under James Steele Williams. The United States was a major producer of fluorspar during World War II. Fluorspar/fluorite was classified as critical during World War II because a large percentage of United States consumption of this industrially important mineral was satisfied by imports.When the war was over, she began as a paleontologist. Her research spanned over a wide field and included identification of the late Paleozoic Bryozoa and other corals. This responsibility led her to analyze other algae, archaeocyathids, and hydrozoa. Duncan produced over 400 fossil records both during her work at the USGS and afterwards.

In her career, Duncan gained a distinguished reputation for her work on fossil corals and Bryozoa. She was the first to identify Bighornia. This work was especially important because Bighornia is substantially different from those fossil horn corals found in the eastern United States. The papers of Helen M. Duncan document her career with the USGS and her research on fossil Bryozoa. They include incoming and outgoing correspondence with colleagues mostly concerning the identification of specimens; reports on specimens examined; and notes, lists, drafts of papers, and related materials from her research. Much of her work identified and correlated fossil corals throughout the western United States and Canada that had never been previously identified. Through these efforts, her impact was large enough that her fossil descriptions can be used to identify index fossils for the Ordovician and Silurian geologic periods. Duncan’s work on Ordovician and Silurian Coral Faunas analyzed the distribution of the corals in western states of America including Colorado, Idaho, Montana, New Mexico, Nevada, South Dakota, Texas, Utah, Washington and Wyoming. This work also distinguished and illustrated many corals that had been overlooked or misidentified by previous American publications. Duncan’s publication pointed out and identified the distinctions between Ordovician and Silurian corals. Duncan’s extensive work distinguished the features and distribution of Early, Middle and Late Ordovician as well as Silurian corals. Her work also contains a section of detailed images of the corals found in Western Faunas. Duncan's work was extremely detailed and meticulous, and her descriptions continue to be used as example of thoroughness in modern paleontology classes. For example, paleontologist J. Thomas Dutro, Jr. credited Duncan for setting "a high standard", which influenced his own work. Together they determined through the works of Baltz and Read (Baltz and Read, 1960, p. 1766) about a possibility of an Early Mississippian age.

In the early 1950s, she assisted collecting samples for George C. Hardin's Babb Fault System, Crittenden and Livingston Counties. From 1960 to the time of her death, Helen Duncan represented various committees around the world. In 1960, she attended the International Geological Congress in Copenhagen. In 1967, she attended the Sixth Carboniferous Congress in Sheffield, England on behalf of USGS. Helen was a Fellow of the Geological Society of America and a member of Sigma Xi, the Washington Academy of Sciences, the Paleontological Society, the Palaeontological Association, the American Association for the Advancement of Science, and the Society of Systematic Zoology. She also belonged to the Geological Society of Washington, where she held the position of Councilor, and the Paleontological Society of Washington, where she served as Vice-President and Treasurer.

Her research on Paleozoic corals allowed Survey field geologists to exploit them for the first time in terms of stratigraphy. As a result, the Paleontology and Stratigraphy Branch had to hire three extra coral specialists to handle the influx of collections that were sent in for identification. She received the Meritorious Service Award from the Department of the Interior in 1971 for her numerous, largely anonymous contributions and noteworthy publications.

In the Geologic Reconnaissance of the Mineral Deposits of Thailand, Helen Duncan supposes the age of the fossils found in limestone and siltstone known as Tentaculites, which is a genus of conical fossils. This fossil shared many of the same characteristics as the sandy shales where Silurian graptolites are also found. This fact alone gave Helen the idea that these Tentaculites shales came from the Silurian age, which dates 443 million years ago. Helen's field work in the Rockies and Great Basin eventually lead to her discovery of new index fossils.

== Death ==
After years of suffering illness, Duncan died at home in Virginia City, Montana, on August 14, 1971. This was due to rheumatic heart disease, an illness that was first noticed in 1968, when she collapsed in a London airport. She continued to dedicate herself to her work on diagnostic fossils even during her illness. She died leaving important research on Ordovician corals and the possible origin of Alcyonaria investigation incomplete. Duncan however, will be remembered for her important work on palaeontology and most specifically late Paleozoic Bryozoa corals. Duncan never married, and left behind no known family.

== Awards and recognitions ==
- Member of Subcommission on Carboniferous Stratigraphy of the International Union of Geological Sciences (1960)
- Ambassador for the U.S. Geological Survey at International Geological Congress (1960)
- Member of the Paleontological Society (1964)
- Member of the Paleontological Association (1965)
- Member of the American Association for the Advancement of Science (1965)
- Member of the Society of Systematic Zoology (1967)
- Member of Sigma Xi (1967)
- U.S Geological Survey representative at the Sixth Carboniferous Congress in Sheffield, England (1967)
- Fellow of the Geological Society of America (1968)
- Vice-President and Treasurer at the Geological Society of Washington (1969)
- Member of the Washington Academy of Sciences (1969)
- Meritorious Service Award by the Department of the Interior (1971)

== Publications ==
- Duncan, Helen M. Trepostomata from the Traverse group of Michigan. Bozeman: Montana State University Press (1937).
- Duncan, Helen M. Taxonomy of Devonian Trepostomata [abs]. Geol. Soc. America Proc. (1937), p. 276-277
- Duncan, Helen M. Trepostomatous Bryozoa from the Traverse Group of Michigan: Michigan Univ. Mus-Paleontology Contr., v. 5, no. 10 (1939), p. 171-210
- Duncan, Helen M. Genotypes of some Paleozoic Bryozoa. Washington Acad. Sci. Jour., v. 39, no.4 (1949), p. 122-136
- Easton, W. H. and Duncan, Helen M. "Archimedes and its Genotype". Journal of Paleontology. SEPM Society for Sedimentary Geology. Vol. 27, No. 5 (September 1953), pp. 737–741. JSTOR 1300075
- Duncan, Helen M. Corals, in Cooper, G. A., and others, eds, Permian fauna at El Antimonio, western Sonora, Mexico: Smithsonian Misc, Colln., v. 119, no. 2 (1953), p. 21
- Williams, James Steele and Duncan, Helen. "Fluorspar deposits in western Kentucky, part 1: Introduction" Fluorspar deposits in western Kentucky. 1012-A (1955), pp. 1–6.
- Duncan, Helen M. "Bighornia, a New Ordovician Coral Genus". Journal of Paleontology. 31.3 (1957). p. 607–615. JSTOR 1300536
- Duncan, Helen M. Heterocorals in the Carboniferous of North America [abs]. Geol. Soc. America Spec. Paper 87, p. 48-49. (1965)
- Duncan, Helen M. and Mackenzie Gordon, Jr. "Biostratigraphy and correlation" in Upper Paleozoic rocks in the Oquirrh Mountains and Bingham mining district, Utah. Washington: United States Government Printing Office (1970).
- Duncan, Helen M. "Ordovician and Silurian Coral Faunas Of The Western United States".
- Duncan, Helen M. (and Barnes, V. E., and Cloud, P.E., Tr.) Upper Ordovician of central Texas: Am. Assoc.Petroleum Geologists Bull., V.37, no. 5, p. 1030–1043. (1953)
- Duncan, Helen M. Class Anthozoa, in Mudge, M.R., and Yochelson, E.L., Stratigraphy and Paleontology of the uppermost Pennsylvanian and lowermost Permian rocks in Kansas: U.S. Geol. Survey Prof. Paper 323, p. 64-67, 122. (1962)
