= Butte Post =

American newspaper

The Butte Post
- Type: 6 days per week
- Format: 16 page, 7 column
- Owner(s): Lee Mantle; Marcus Daly; John Durston
- Founded: 1881
- Ceased publication: 1961
- Headquarters: Butte, Montana, United States
- ISSN: 2472-0283
- OCLC number: 11748718

The Butte Post, also known as The Butte Daily Post and formerly known as The Butte Inter Mountain and The Daily Intermountain, was a newspaper published in Butte, Montana. The first issue was published on March 21, 1881, and the final issue was published on July 21, 1961.

The paper was founded as the Daily Intermountain by English-American businessman and Republican politician Lee Mantle. While managing the paper, Mantle became the mayor of Butte and one of Montana's two senators. Fred Lockley was the first editor of the paper, which was credited for his start in the newspaper business.

In early 1901, the newspaper was acquired by interests associated with Marcus Daly, owner of the Anaconda Standard. It was one of several Montana newspapers under the control of the Anaconda Copper Mining Company and was described as "aggressively Republican throughout its career", advocating for anti-union positions and against farmers who sued Anaconda Copper for smoke-related damages.

In 1913, the newspaper was reconstituted as the Butte Post by long-time Anaconda Standard editor John Durston. It engaged in political attacks against congresswoman Jeannette Rankin and criticized striking workers. By 1920, the Anaconda Company owned several additional Montana newspapers including the Anaconda Standard, Butte Miner, Daily Missoulian, Helena Independent, and Billings Gazette.

When Anaconda Copper campaigned against progressive Governor Joseph M. Dixon in 1924, Durston initially defended the governor but was reprimanded and later retired as editor of the paper. Durston became a critic of the paper later in life for failing to confront power.

In 1961, Lee Enterprises purchased the Anaconda Copper-owned newspapers including the Butte Post, and the paper ceased publication.
