= Thomas H. Carter =

American politician (1854–1911)

Thomas Carter
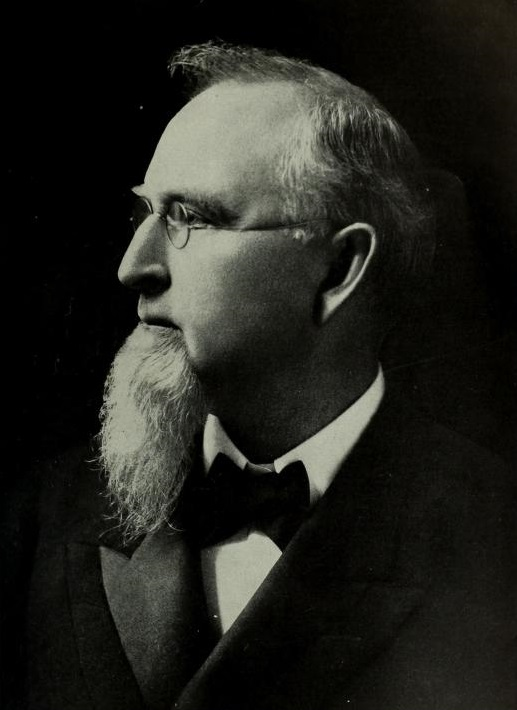
- Carter in 1910

United States Senator from Montana
- In office March 4, 1905 – March 3, 1911
- Preceded by: Paris Gibson
- Succeeded by: Henry L. Myers
- In office March 4, 1895 – March 3, 1901
- Preceded by: Thomas Power
- Succeeded by: William Clark

Chair of the Republican National Committee
- In office July 16, 1892 – June 18, 1896
- Preceded by: William Campbell
- Succeeded by: Mark Hanna

Commissioner of the General Land Office
- In office March 31, 1891 – November 18, 1892
- President: Benjamin Harrison
- Preceded by: Lewis Groff
- Succeeded by: William M. Stone

Member of the U.S. House of Representatives from Montana's at-large district
- In office November 8, 1889 – March 3, 1891
- Preceded by: Himself (Delegate)
- Succeeded by: William W. Dixon

Delegate to the U.S. House of Representatives from Montana's at-large district
- In office March 4, 1889 – November 8, 1889
- Preceded by: Joseph Toole
- Succeeded by: Himself (Representative)

Personal details
- Born: Thomas Henry Carter; October 30, 1854 Junior Furnace, Ohio, U.S.
- Died: September 17, 1911 (aged 56) Washington, D.C., U.S.
- Party: Republican
- Spouse: Ellen Galen (m. 1886)

Thomas Henry Carter (October 30, 1854 – September 17, 1911) was an American politician, who served as territorial delegate, a United States representative, and a U.S. senator from Montana. Carter was born in Junior Furnace, Ohio, on October 30, 1854. Born to an Irish immigrant family, he spent most of his childhood on small farms in the Midwest. In 1882, he moved to Helena, Montana to begin his law career there. He then entered politics and was elected Montana's territorial delegate in 1888. Following Montana's admission into the union as a state, Carter represented the state in the U.S. House of Representatives. He ran for re-election in 1890, but was narrowly defeated by Democrat William W. Dixon in the general election.

Following his failed re-election bid, President Benjamin Harrison appointed Carter as the Commissioner of the General Land Office in 1891. He served as commissioner until 1892, when he was elected chairman of the Republican National Committee, the first Catholic to do so.

== Early life and career ==
=== Childhood and youth ===
Carter was born to Irish immigrant parents on October 30, 1854, in a small village known as Junior Furnace, near Portsmouth, Scioto County, Ohio. His parents, Edward and Margaret (Byrnes) Carter, came to the United States in 1849 or 1850 following the Great Famine. They were married in Wheeling, West Virginia, shortly after their arrival in the U.S., Edward converting to Catholicism from the Anglican Church due to Margaret's influence. The Carters settled in Junior Furnace, Ohio by 1852 when their first son, Richard, was born. Shortly after Thomas' birth in 1854 the family moved to a farm a few miles from Junior Furnace.

Following the end of the Civil War in 1865, the Carters used their savings and moved to Pana, Illinois, where young Tommy Carter attended common schools and worked on his parents' farm. Edward Carter instilled in his children a love for reading and with it a love of learning. Early in his adult life, following his family's loss of their farm due to a lightning-caused fire burning their barn and killing their farm animals, Thomas Carter engaged in railroad work and school teaching.

=== Career and marriage ===
For several years, Carter worked as a travelling salesman for a book publisher based in Burlington, Iowa. After the premature death of his mother to pneumonia in March 1879, Carter moved his two younger sisters, Julia and Margaret, and a younger brother, Edward Jr., to be with him in Burlington, Iowa, where he now worked as head of the sales department of a publishing company while their father worked in Kentucky. Thomas and his sisters formed a particular bond in these years in Burlington as he supported and cared for them as a father. After many long years of studying the law, Carter finally passed the bar examination in Nebraska while there on a business trip (likely in 1881, though the record is unclear).

In May 1882, at the advice of friends, he moved from Burlington to Helena, Montana, ostensibly to begin his law career there. After a brief stint selling books again, he formed a law partnership with Helena lawyer John B. Clayton. Within a year of arriving in Helena, Carter sent for his sisters and brother in Burlington to join him. From his childhood Carter nurtured a close relationship with the Catholic Church, and upon his arrival in Helena this relationship continued and even strengthened. On January 27, 1886, Carter married Ellen Lillian Galen, the daughter of Montana pioneers Hugh F. Galen and Matilda Gillogly Galen, at the cathedral in St. Paul, Minnesota.

== Political career ==
=== Territorial delegate ===
Carter's first foray into public office in Montana was in the role of public administrator for Lewis and Clark County. In 1888, he was nominated as the Republican candidate for the position of Territorial Delegate to Congress. In the general election in November he faced Butte copper king and Democrat William Clark, making his first of numerous attempts at federal office. Carter upset Clark by winning the three largely Democratic counties of Silver Bow, Deer Lodge, and Missoula, likely with the assistance of Marcus Daly, another influential Montana Democratic copper king and enemy of Clark. Montana's Irish voters, who disliked Clark, also likely helped Carter to victory. This particular election is said to have initiated the famous "War of the Copper Kings." Nonetheless, Carter was elected as a Delegate to Congress and served a short term from March 4, 1889, to November 7, 1889, when the Territory of Montana was admitted as a state into the Union.

=== United States House ===
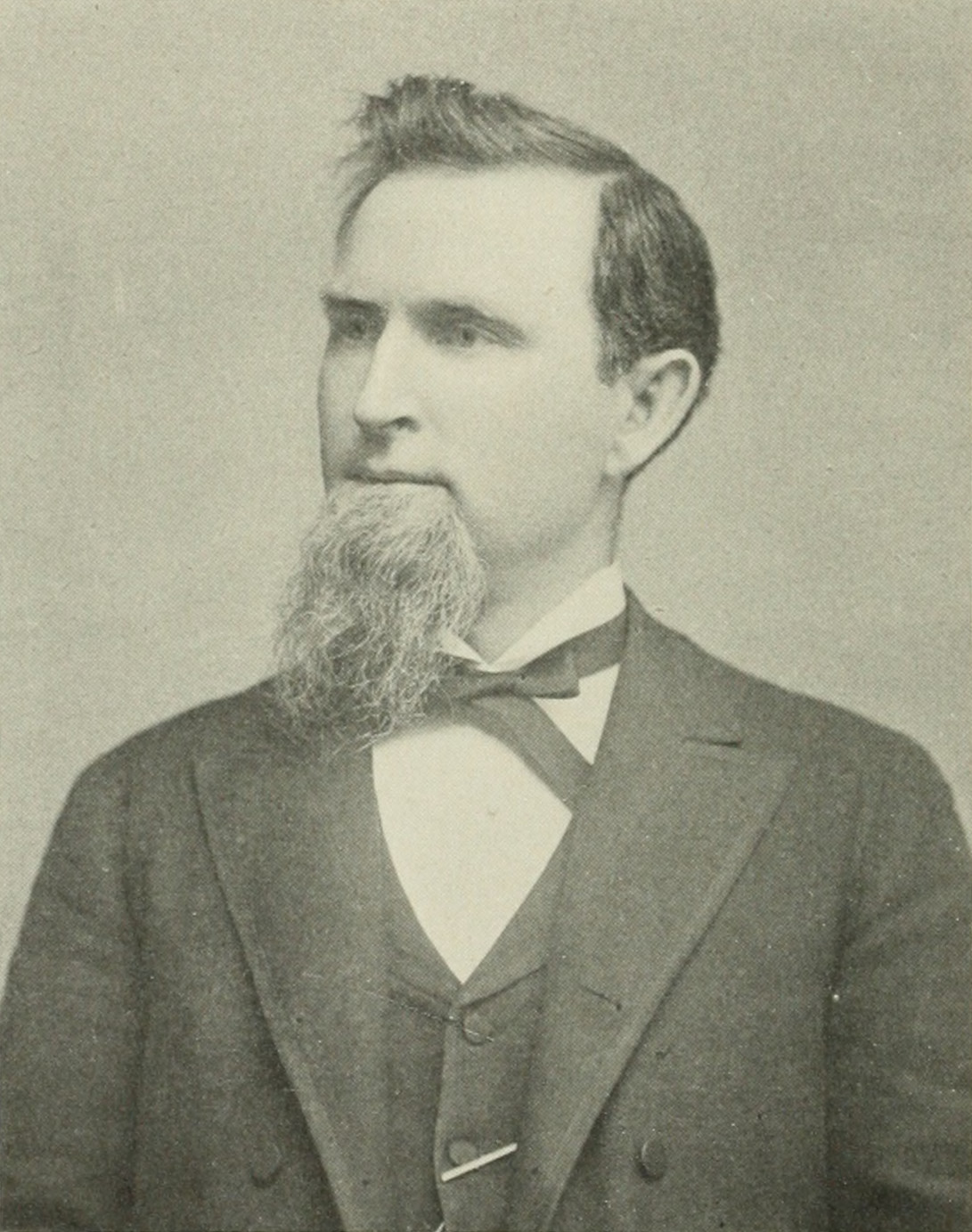
Thomas Henry Carter, pictured sometime in the 1890s

The people of Montana again elected Carter as their first Representative to Congress on October 1, 1889, when he defeated long-time territorial delegate and leading Montana Democrat Martin Maginnis, serving from November 8, 1889, to March 3, 1891. Importantly, Carter served as chairman of the Committee on Mines and Mining, as one historian suggested, due to his friendship with legendary Speaker of the House Thomas B. Reid of Maine., a remarkable achievement for a freshman legislator in the House of Representatives. Carter was an unsuccessful candidate in 1890 for reelection, losing a close election to Butte lawyer and Democrat William W. Dixon by 283 votes, or less than 1% of the total votes cast. President Benjamin Harrison appointed Carter as the Commissioner of the General Land Office from 1891 to 1892, when he was elected chairman of the Republican National Committee. He was the first Catholic to be the chairman of the Republican Party.

=== United States Senate ===
Carter was elected as a Republican to the United States Senate and served from March 4, 1895, until March 3, 1901. As a Senator, he was chairman of the Committee on Relations with Canada (Fifty-fourth Congress) and the Committee on the Census (Fifty-fifth and Fifty-sixth Congresses). President William McKinley appointed him a member of the board of commissioners of the Louisiana Purchase Exposition and he served as its president. Carter was elected again as a Republican to the United States Senate and served from March 4, 1905, to March 3, 1911. He was not a candidate for reelection. He died from a lung infarction while at home in Washington, D.C., on September 17, 1911. His funeral was held at St. Paul's Roman Catholic Church, and he was interred at Mount Olivet Cemetery in the city.

== Legacy ==
In Glacier National Park, two natural features are named for Thomas H. Carter: a glacier and a peak. Two towns in Montana named for Carter are Carter in Chouteau County, and Cartersville in Rosebud County. Carter County, Montana was also named in his honor in 1917.

== Citations ==
U.S. House of Representatives
Preceded by Joseph Toole	Delegate to the U.S. House of Representatives from Montana's at-large district 1889	Succeeded by Himself as U.S. Representative
Preceded by Himself as U.S. Delegate	Member of the U.S. House of Representatives from Montana's 2nd congressional district 1889–1891	Succeeded by Charles S. Hartman
Political offices
Preceded by Lewis Groff	Commissioner of the General Land Office; 1891–1892	Succeeded by William M. Stone
Party political offices
Preceded by William Campbell	Chair of the Republican National Committee; 1892–1896	Succeeded by Mark Hanna
U.S. Senate
Preceded by Thomas Power	U.S. Senator (Class 2) from Montana; 1895–1901; Served alongside: Lee Mantle, William Clark	Succeeded by William Clark
Preceded by Edward Murphy	Chair of the Senate Canadian Relations Committee; 1895–1897	Succeeded by John Spooner
Preceded by William Chandler	Chair of the Senate Census Committee; 1897–1901	Succeeded by Joseph V. Quarles
Preceded by Paris Gibson	U.S. Senator (Class 1) from Montana; 1905–1911; Served alongside: William Clark, Joseph M. Dixon	Succeeded by Henry L. Myers
