= Timeline of pre-statehood Montana history =

This is a timeline of pre-statehood Montana history comprising substantial events in the history of the area that would become the State of Montana prior to November 8, 1889. This area existed as Montana Territory from May 28, 1864, until November 8, 1889, when it was admitted to the Union as the State of Montana.

== Pre-territorial period ==
=== 1805–1840 ===
Manuel Lisa

- 1805–1806 – Lewis and Clark Expedition travels through Montana
- November 21, 1807 – Fur trader Manuel Lisa establishes Fort Raymond at the mouth of the Big Horn River on the Yellowstone River.
- Summer 1808 (1809?) – Fur trapper John Colter escapes a band of Blackfeet Indians near Three Forks, Montana in what is known as "Colter's Run".
- November 9, 1809 – British fur trader and explorer David Thompson establishes Saleesh House at Thompson Falls on the Columbia River.
- February 26, 1810 – British fur trader and explorer David Thompson encounters Bitterroot Salish Indians wintering on the Flathead River below Flathead Lake.
- March 20, 1822 – William H. Ashley forms the Rocky Mountain Fur Company in St. Louis and operates it in Wyoming and Montana for twelve years. Jim Bridger, William Sublette, James Pierson Beckwourth and Jedediah Smith are among its corps of trappers.
- 1828 – The American Fur Company establishes Fort Union on the Missouri River near its confluence with the Yellowstone River.
- April–July 1832 – The first steamship into Montana, the "Yellowstone", makes its inaugural round-trip voyage from St. Louis to Fort Union.
- June 24, 1833 – Prince Maximilian of Wied-Neuwied arrives at Fort Union on the steamship "Assiniboin" spending five weeks traveling among the Native Americans and hunting in the Marias River country.
- 1836–1845 – Hugh Monroe, a French Canadian fur trader from Quebec was most likely the first white person to visit the region of Glacier National Park.

=== 1841–1850 ===
- September 24, 1841 – Jesuit priest Pierre Jean DeSmet, arrives in the Bitterroot Valley and establishes St. Mary's Mission, the first Euro-American settlement in what became Montana.
- June 15, 1846 – The United Kingdom and the U.S. sign the Oregon Treaty establishing the 49th Parallel as the border between Canada and the U.S., as well as ceding the territory of western Montana to the U.S.
- 1846 – Alexander Culbertson establishes Fort Benton as the last fur trading post on the Upper Missouri River.

=== 1851–1860 ===
- July 16, 1855 – Governor of Washington Territory, Isaac Stevens concludes the Hellgate treaty with Salish, Pend d'Oreille and Kootenai chiefs which establishes the Jocko Reservation.
- May 2, 1858 – Brothers James and Granville Stuart discover gold at Gold Creek near the present site of Drummond, Montana.
- 1860 – Frank L. Worden and Captain Christopher P. Higgins found the settlement of Hell Gate near present-day Missoula, Montana.
- 1859–1860 – A military expedition under command of Captain William F. Raynolds explores parts of what would later become Montana searching for routes through the area.
- 1859–1860 – The United States federal government completes the Mullan Road between Fort Benton and Walla Walla, Washington.
- July 2, 1860 – Steamboats "Chippewa" and "Key West" arrive at the head of navigation of the Missouri River at Fort Benton, Montana.

=== 1861–1864 ===
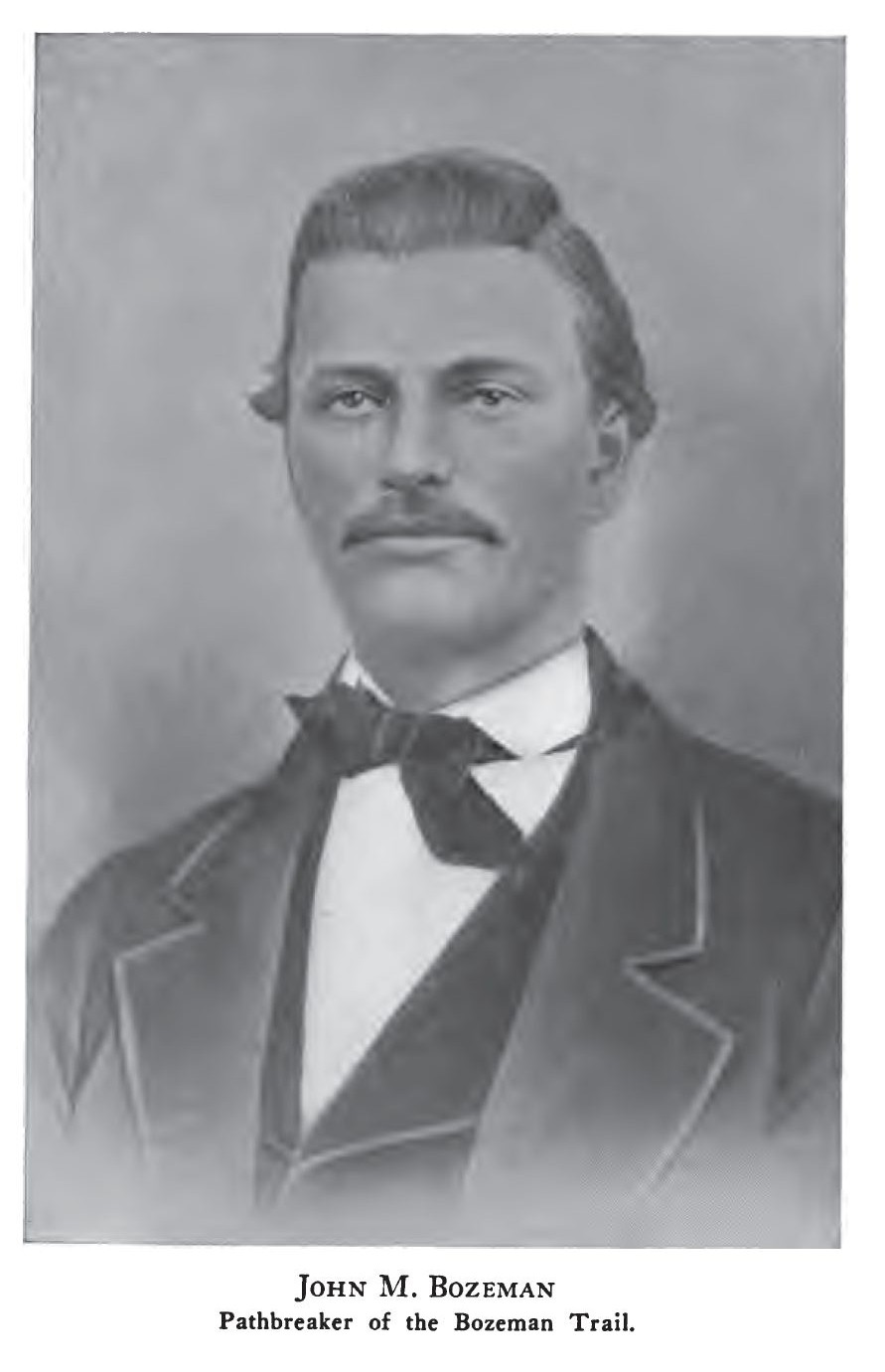
John Bozeman

- July 28, 1862 – A major gold strike at Grasshopper Creek leads to the settlement of Bannack City.
- August 26, 1862 – C. W. Spillman, a horse thief is hanged at Gold Creek, the first recorded hanging in what would later become Montana
- November 1862 – The first permanent settlement in the Gallatin Valley, Gallatin City, is established near present-day Three Forks, Montana by Frank and Thomas Dunbar.
- November 24, 1862 – The first post office in what would later become Montana is established at Hell Gate.
- March 4, 1863 – U.S. Congress creates Idaho Territory from the eastern portion of Washington Territory and the western portion of Dakota Territory, for the first time politically uniting lands of present-day Montana west of the Continental Divide with those east of the Divide.
- May 5, 1863 – Civilian prospectors James Stuart and fifteen men plat Big Horn City at the confluence of the Big Horn and Yellowstone Rivers during the Yellowstone Expedition of 1863.
- May 26, 1863 – Bill Fairweather and Henry Edgar discover the largest placer gold strike in North America at Alder Gulch.
- July 1863 – John Bozeman and John Jacobs blaze the Bozeman Trail from Douglas, Wyoming to Bannack, Montana.
- December 19–21, 1863 – George Ives is tried and hanged for the murder of Nicolas Tiebolt in Nevada City, Montana. Wilbur F. Sanders acts as the prosecution.
- December 23, 1863 – The Vigilance Committee of Alder Gulch is established in Virginia City, Montana
- January 1864 – The Vigilance Committee of Virginia City, Montana tries and hangs Cyrus Skinner, Aleck Carter and Johnny Cooper in Hell Gate
- January 10, 1864 – Henry Plummer, the sheriff of Bannack, Montana, is hanged with two other alleged criminals for robbery and murder by Montana Vigilantes.
- 1864 – Jim Bridger guides immigrants and prospectors along the Bridger Trail to Virginia City, Montana

== Territorial period ==
=== 1864 ===
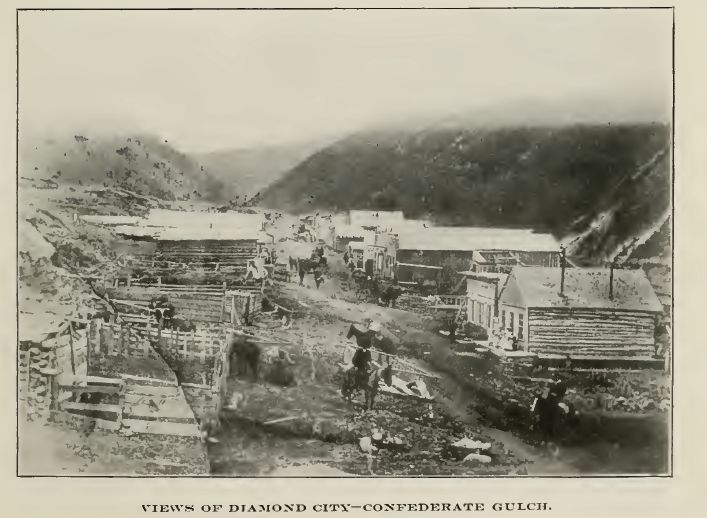
Confederate Gulch ca 1870

- May 28 – Montana Territory created from portion of Idaho Territory and Dakota Territory
- May 28 – Bannack selected as first territorial capital
- June 22 – Sidney Edgerton appointed first governor of Montana Territory
- July 21 – Gold was discovered in "Last Chance Gulch" which resulted in the settlement of Helena, Montana.
- August 9 – The Upper East Gallatin Association formed to officially establish the city of Bozeman, Montana
- August 27 – Volume 1, Number 1 of the Montana Post was published in Virginia City, Montana as the first newspaper in Montana Territory
- October 24 – Montana's first congressional election sends Democrat Samuel McLean to the U.S. Congress as Montana's first territorial delegate, cementing the territory's reputation as a Democratic Party stronghold.
- December 3 – Gold is discovered at Confederate Gulch in the Big Belt Mountains.
- December 12 – The first territorial Legislature Assembly of Montana convenes in Bannack, Montana.
- December 30 – Territorial Legislative Assembly names Virginia City as the first incorporated town in Montana.

=== 1865 ===
- February 2 – Historical Society of Montana incorporated at Virginia City, Montana.
- February 5 – Governor Edgerton approves the Montana Territorial Seal designed by Francis M. Thompson (effectively the seal used by the state of Montana)
- February 7 – Virginia City, Montana becomes the second capital of Montana Territory
- March 24 – Congress authorizes the Blackfoot Treaty of 1865 (signed in October at Fort Benton, Montana) by which the Blackfoot tribes ceded all lands south of the Missouri and Teton rivers and west of the Milk river to the Rocky Mountains to the U.S. Government.
- Summer – Frank L. Worden and Captain Christopher P. Higgins began construction of lumber and flour mills five miles east of Hell Gate. Known as Missoula Mills, this became the site of Missoula, Montana
- August 26 – The Montana Post, Virginia City, Montana publishes the first serial of Thomas J. Dimsdale's The Vigilantes of Montana
- September 1 – U.S. Army forces engaged about 300 Hunkpapa, Sans Arc, and Miniconjou Lakota Sioux at Alkali Creek, near Broadus, Montana during the Powder River Expedition.
- September – Thomas Francis Meagher appointed territorial governor of Montana
- October 14 – The first regular mails arrived in Helena, Montana via stagecoach from Corinne, Utah.

=== 1866 ===
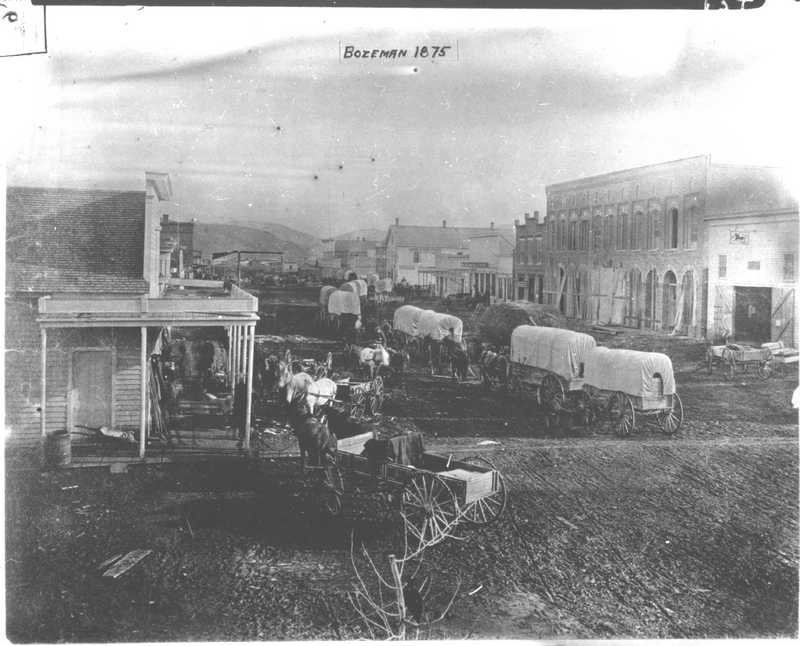
Bozeman Mainstreet, 1875

- Thomas J. Dimsdale, Virginia City, Montana publishes the first edition of The Vigilantes of Montana in book form. The first book ever published in Montana.
- July – Green Clay Smith appointed territorial governor of Montana
- July 10 – Camp Cooke, the first U.S. Army post built in Montana located on the Missouri River, at the mouth of the Judith River was named for General Philip St. George Cooke, the commander of the Department of the Platte at the time.
- August 12 – Fort C. F. Smith established on the Big Horn River to protect the Bozeman Trail.
- August 23 – Cattleman Johnny Grant sells his Deer Lodge, Montana ranch to cattle baron Conrad Kohrs.
- November 2 – The first telegraph messages to and from Montana are sent from Salt Lake City to Virginia City and back to President Andrew Johnson by Governor Green Clay Smith.
- December – Nelson Story arrives in Paradise Valley with first herd of Texas Longhorn cattle driven north on the Bozeman Trail from Texas.

=== 1867 ===
- May – Montana Territorial militia establish Fort Elizabeth Meagher near Bozeman, Montana.
- July 1 – Thomas Francis Meagher, Territorial Governor mysteriously dies in the Missouri River near Fort Benton, Montana.
- August 27 – U.S. Army establishes Fort Ellis just east of Bozeman, Montana garrisoned with five companies of the 2nd Cavalry Regiment to protect the Gallatin Valley.

=== 1868 ===
- July 29 – Fort Smith evacuated, beginning the closure of the Bozeman Trail to white settlers as a result of Red Cloud's War.
- November 6 – Red Cloud signs Treaty of Fort Laramie, which required abandonment of all forts along the Bozeman Trail.

=== 1869 ===
- James Mitchell Ashley appointed territorial governor of Montana territory
- August 23 – Prominent Helena rancher Malcolm Clarke was killed at his ranch home near the mouth of the Prickly Pear Creek by a band of Piegan Blackfeet.
- September 6 – David E. Folsom, Charles W. Cook and William Peterson of Diamond City, Montana, a gold camp in the Confederate Gulch area of the Big Belt Mountains east of Helena, Montana begin the Cook–Folsom–Peterson Expedition which was the first organized expedition to explore the region that became Yellowstone National Park.
- November 20 – The first Crow Indian Agency was established on Mission Creek just east of Livingston, Montana.

=== 1870 ===
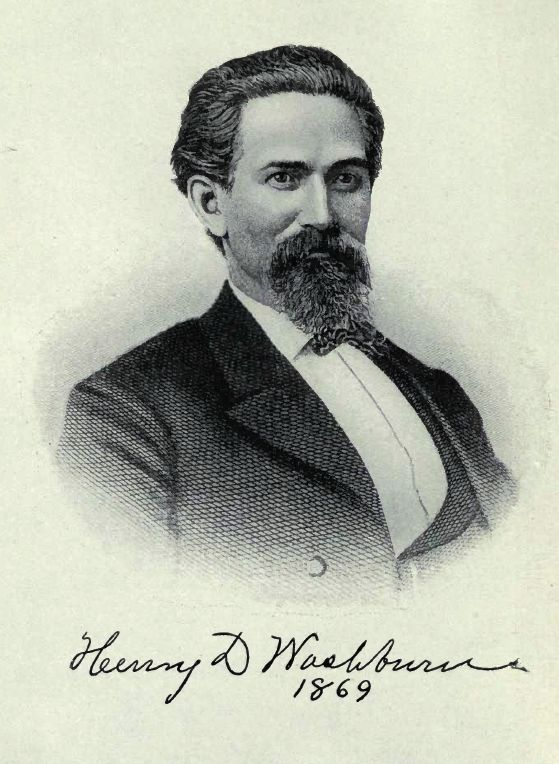
Henry Washburn, 1869

- January 23 – Piegan Blackfeet are massacred on the Marias River by the U.S. Army 2nd Cavalry Regiment under the command of Major Eugene Baker.
- August 16 – Civilian members of the Washburn–Langford–Doane Expedition depart Helena, Montana en route to Fort Ellis to link up with a U.S. Army escort for the first official exploration of the Yellowstone region.
- Benjamin F. Potts appointed territorial governor
- September 29 – Henry Comstock, a discoverer of the Comstock Lode died (suicide) in Bozeman

=== 1871 ===
- June 30 – the Hayden Geological Survey of 1871 enters Montana Territory en route to the Yellowstone region via Fort Ellis to spend 45 days exploring what was to become Yellowstone National Park in 1872.
- September 13 – The first issue of the weekly Avant Courier newspaper, the precursor of the Bozeman Chronicle was published in Bozeman.
- November 4 – President Ulysses S. Grant issued an Executive order directing the removal of the Flathead Indians from the Bitterroot Valley to the Jocko reservation.

=== 1872 ===
- March 1 – President Ulysses S. Grant signs the bill establishing Yellowstone National Park, portions of which are in Gallatin and Park counties, Montana.
- June 5 – The U.S. Congress establishes the Flathead Indian Reservation for Bitterroot Salish, Pend d'Oreille and Kootenai tribes and opens the Bitterroot Valley to homesteading.
- July 23 – Col. John A Haydon leads a Northern Pacific railway survey party from Fort Ellis, east of present-day Bozeman, Montana. Haydon's supply train consisted of almost seventy wagons with rations for 105 days and a small herd of beef cattle. Haydon's military escort, commanded by Major Eugene Baker, Second Cavalry, consisting of four companies, 187 men, of the Second Cavalry, and four companies, 189 men, of the Seventh Infantry.
- August 14 - The Battle of Pryor's Creek takes place with a war party formed with as many as a thousand warriors of Lakotas, Cheyennes, Arapahos and Kiowas to go upstream on the Powder river. This war party led by Sitting Bull, Red Cloud and Crazy horse attacks Haydon's railroad survey party and its military escort. By mid morning the attack was over and no one in the railroad party was injured.

=== 1873 ===
- July – The U.S. Northern Boundary Commission (1872–1874) survey party maps astronomical site #18 at the Great Coteau of the Missouri which roughly corresponds to the border between Montana and North Dakota while officially mapping the 49th parallel boundary between the U.S. and Canada.
- August 4, 1873 – George Armstrong Custer encounters Sitting Bull and Crazy Horse at the Battle of Honsinger Bluff, also known as the Second Battle of Tongue River.
- November 25 – Brothers Will and Robert Sutherlin begin publication of the Rocky Mountain Husbandman in Diamond City. It was the leading agricultural publication in Montana for over forty years.
- December 22 – The first national Grange chapter is organized at Deep Creek near Townsend, Montana by Robert Sutherlin.

=== 1874 ===
- January 9 – Fire destroys most buildings and businesses in Helena, Montana.
- August – Helena, Montana selected as the territorial capital replacing Virginia City, Montana.

=== 1875 ===
- July 8 – W.C. Shippen, a Methodist minister in Helena, Montana has the "Hanging Tree", a tall, dead Ponderosa Pine cut down. Ten men had been hanged on the tree which stood at the corner of Broadway and Davis streets; the last being J.L. Compton and Joseph Wilson on April 30, 1870, for robbery and murder.
- December 6 – The Federal Indian Bureau issues a proclamation that any Indians found off their respective reservations as of January 31, 1876 would be considered hostile. This set the stage for the Great Sioux War of 1876.

=== 1876 ===
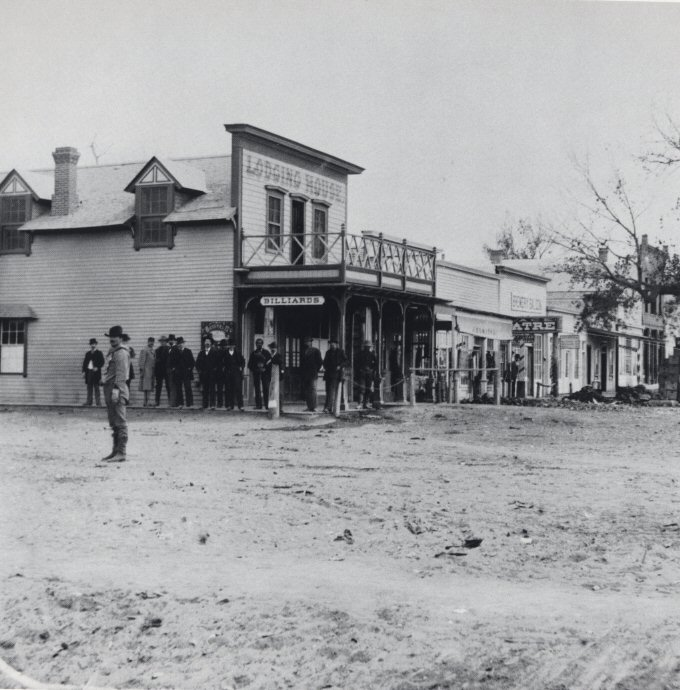
Miles City, 1881

- March 17 – The Battle of Powder River takes place between forces of the U.S. Army and Northern Cheyenne near present-day Broadus, Montana.
- June 17 – Lakota and Northern Cheyenne tribes under the leadership of Crazy Horse engage U.S. Army forces under the command of Brigadier General George Crook at the Battle of the Rosebud.
- June 25–26 – Forces under the command of Lieutenant Colonel George Armstrong Custer, 7th Cavalry Regiment are defeated at the Battle of the Little Bighorn by a large force of Lakota, Northern Cheyenne, and Arapaho tribes during the Great Sioux War of 1876.
- August 28 – General William Tecumseh Sherman ordered Colonel Nelson A. Miles to establish a U.S. Army cantonment at the mouth of the Tongue River, a strategic point along the Yellowstone River, near present-day Miles City, Montana. Work soon began on the army post, which would officially be named Fort Keogh on November 8, 1878. From headquarters here, General Miles effectively operated against the Sioux forces led by Sitting Bull and others.
- October 21 – Colonel Nelson Miles and the 5th Infantry Regiment encounter Sioux chief Sitting Bull at the Battle of Cedar Creek.

=== 1877 ===
- January 7–8 – Colonel Nelson Miles attacks winter camp of Crazy Horse on Tongue River at the Battle of Wolf Mountain.
- February 19 – U.S. Army establishes Fort Missoula to protect growing settlements in the area
- May – Sitting Bull and a small band of Sioux refuse to surrender to the U.S. Army and escape to Wood Mountain in Southern Saskatchewan, Canada. He remained in exile for many years finally surrendering in July 1881.
- August 9–10 – Nez Perce inflict heavy casualties on U.S. Army at the Battle of the Big Hole during the Nez Perce War.
- August 31 – A band of Nez Perce move north out of Yellowstone into Gardiner and burn the Henderson Ranch. Units of the 2nd Cavalry Regiment under the command of Lieutenant Gustavus Doane drive them back into the park.
- September 13 – Nez Perce escape capture from the U.S. Army 7th Cavalry at the Battle of Canyon Creek near Billings, Montana.
- September 23–25 – Nez Perce trying to escape capture engage soldiers at Cow Creek, Montana delaying their flight north.
- October 5 – Chief Joseph and the Nez Perce surrendered to Colonel Nelson Miles at the Battle of Bear Paw near the Bear Paw Mountains ending the Nez Perce War.

=== 1879 ===
- January 29 – The Secretary of War preserved the site of the Battle of the Little Bighorn as a U.S. National Cemetery to protect graves of the 7th Cavalry troopers buried there. Today the site is the Little Bighorn Battlefield National Monument.
- May 9 – Fort Assinniboine established near Havre, Montana on the Milk River by the 18th Infantry Regiment.

=== 1880 ===
- March 9 – Narrow gauge tracks of the Utah and Northern Railway reach Monida Pass from Ogden, Utah to become the first railroad in Montana Territory.
- June 11 – Jeannette Rankin is born, near Missoula.
- Summer – Twenty-seven-year-old photographer Frank Jay Haynes makes first visit to Montana traveling on the steamboat "Far West" from Bismarck, North Dakota to Fort Benton, Montana.
- Summer – Lumberman and rancher Augustus Barrows establishes the stage stop of Ubet, Montana in the Judith Basin.
- September 6 – Actor Joe Rickson, who appeared in 90 silent films, is born in Clearcreek in the Bear Paw Mountains.
- November 18 – Marcus Daly turns on Montana's first electric light in the Alice Mine near Butte, Montana.
- December 4 – Dillon, Montana is established as a railroad camp on the Utah and Northern Railway and is named after the company president, Sidney Dillon.
- DHS Ranch in Fergus County established by A.J. Davis, Samuel Hauser, and Granville Stuart.
- Sixteen-year-old cowboy artist Charles M. Russell arrives in Montana from St. Louis.

=== 1881 ===
- July 5 – Tracks of Northern Pacific Railroad reach Glendive, Montana.
- December 26 – The first Utah and Northern Railway train reaches Butte, Montana.

=== 1882 ===
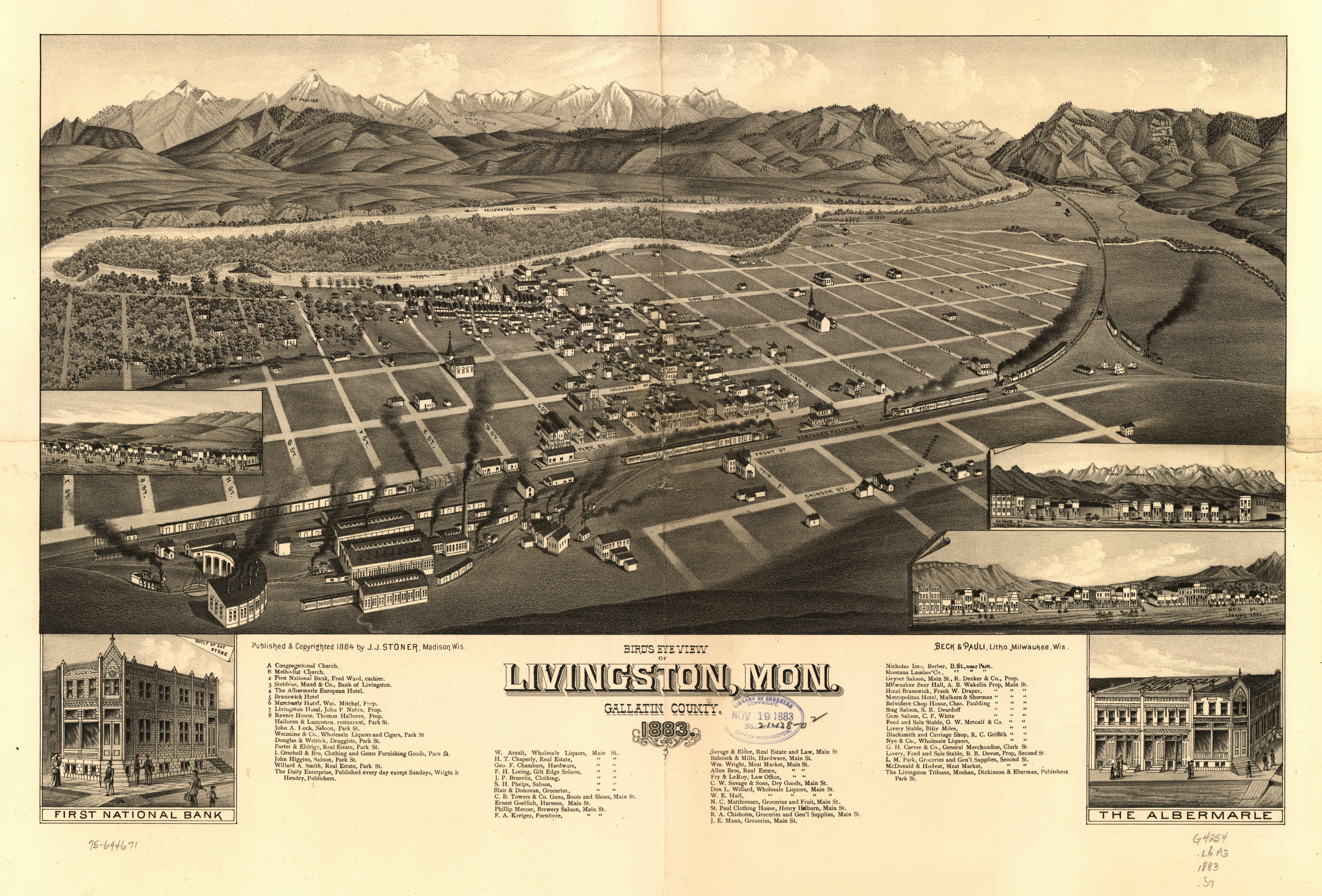
Plat of Livingston, MT (1883)

- March 24 – The Minnesota and Montana Land and Improvement Company is formed by Frederick H. Billings and other investors to plat the city of Billings, Montana in advance of the arrival of the Northern Pacific Railroad.
- March 15 – Major Jacob Klein, commanding a combined force of the 18th Infantry and 2nd Cavalry Regiments drove Chippewa and Cree Indians, and Canadian Metis out of the U.S. into Wood Mountain during the Milk River Expedition
- November 22 – Tracks of Northern Pacific Railroad reach Livingston, Montana.

=== 1883 ===
- March – Territorial Governor, Benjamin Franklin Potts, approved a charter for the Town of Missoula
- Paris Gibson with the backing of railroad magnate James J. Hill founds the city of Great Falls, Montana.
- August 7 – The first eastbound train of the Northern Pacific Railroad crosses the Continental Divide at Mullan Pass.
- September 8 – Ulysses S. Grant participates in the Golden Spike ceremony at Gold Creek signifying the completion of the transcontinental Northern Pacific Railroad.

=== 1884 ===
- July – Montana Stockgrowers Association established by major ranch owners to deal with rustling and vigilantism on the open range.
- September 3 – The Anaconda Copper Mining Company opens a copper smelter in Anaconda, Montana.
- September 11 – The Society of Montana Pioneers was founded in Helena. James Fergus was elected the first president.
- November 26 – President Chester A. Arthur issues an Executive order establishing the Tongue River Indian Reservation.

=== 1885 ===
- George Bird Grinnell hired noted explorer (and later well regarded author) James Willard Schultz to guide him on a hunting expedition into what would later become Glacier National Park
- July 3 – Samuel Hauser appointed 7th Territorial Governor
- October 6 – the weeks long, bloodless Cramer Gulch War starts between rival Missoula logging factions near Beavertail Hill.

=== 1886 ===
- January 25 – Montana Central Railway established by James Jerome Hill eventually to become part of the Great Northern Railway.
- November 15 – Silver is discovered in the Castle Mountains by Lafe Hensley. The boomtown of Castle is founded.

=== 1887 ===
- Winter of 1886–87 – The worst winter in history in the northern plains. Up to 75% of open range cattle perished on Montana ranches
- October 16 – Great Northern Railway tracks reach Fort Assinniboine near present-day Havre, Montana.
- October 31 – The first train of the Great Northern Railway enters Great Falls, Montana.
- November 4 – 1st Cavalry Regiment force under the command of Brigadier General Thomas H. Ruger engage Crow renegades in the Battle of Crow Agency.
- November 19 – The Montana Central Railway is completed between Great Falls and Helena, Montana.

=== 1889 ===
- March 13 – The last session of the last Territorial Legislature adjourns in Helena, Montana.
- November 8 – Montana granted statehood as 41st state in the United States of America.

== See also ==
- History of Montana
  - Bibliography of Montana history
  - Historical outline of Montana
  - List of people in Montana history
  - Montana in the American Civil War
  - State of Montana
  - Territorial evolution of Montana
  - Territory of Montana
  - Timeline of Montana history
