= Gold Creek =

Gold Creek may refer to:

== Populated places ==
=== Australia ===
- Gold Creek Village, Canberra, Australia

=== United States ===
- Gold Creek, Arkansas, an unincorporated community
- Gold Creek, Nevada, a ghost town

== Bodies of water ==
=== United States ===
- Gold Creek (Montana)
- Gold Creek (Washington)
- Gold Creek (Juneau, Alaska)

=== Other places ===
- Gold Creek (Queensland), Australia
- Gold Creek (British Columbia), a tributary of the Fraser River, Canada
- Golden River or Golden Water River, in the outer court of the Forbidden City, Beijing, China

== See also ==
- Goldcreek, Montana, also known as "Gold Creek"
- Little Gold Creek, a border crossing between Dawson City, Yukon and Tok, Alaska
