= Granville Stuart =

American politician

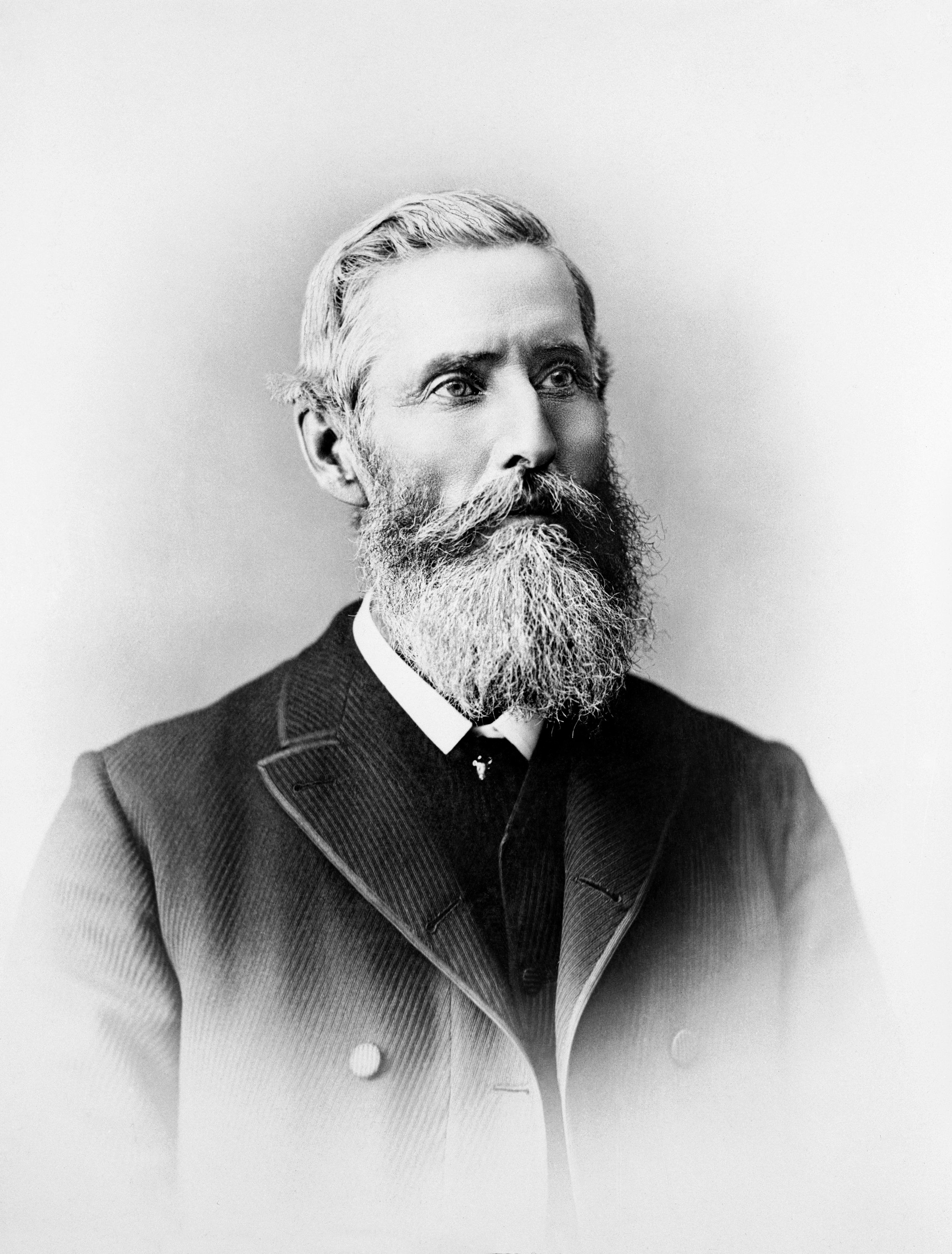
- Granville Stuart in 1883
- Born: August 27, 1834; Harrison County, Virginia, U.S.
- Died: October 2, 1918 (aged 84); Missoula, Montana, U.S.
- Resting place: Deer Lodge, Montana, U.S.
- Other name: Mr. Montana
- Occupations: Pioneer, gold prospector, businessman, civic leader, vigilante, author, cattleman and diplomat
- Political party: Democrat
- Spouse(s): Awbonnie Tookanka (1862–1888), Allis Belle Brown (1890–1918)
- Children: 11

Granville Stuart (August 27, 1834 – October 2, 1918) was an American pioneer, gold prospector, businessman, civic leader, vigilante, author, cattleman and diplomat who played a prominent role in the early history of Montana Territory and the state of Montana. Widely known as "Mr. Montana", Granville's life spanned the formative years of Montana from territorial times through the first 30 years of statehood. His journals and writings have provided Montana and western historians unique insights into life in the Northern Rocky Mountains and Great Plains during the second half the 19th century.

== Early life ==
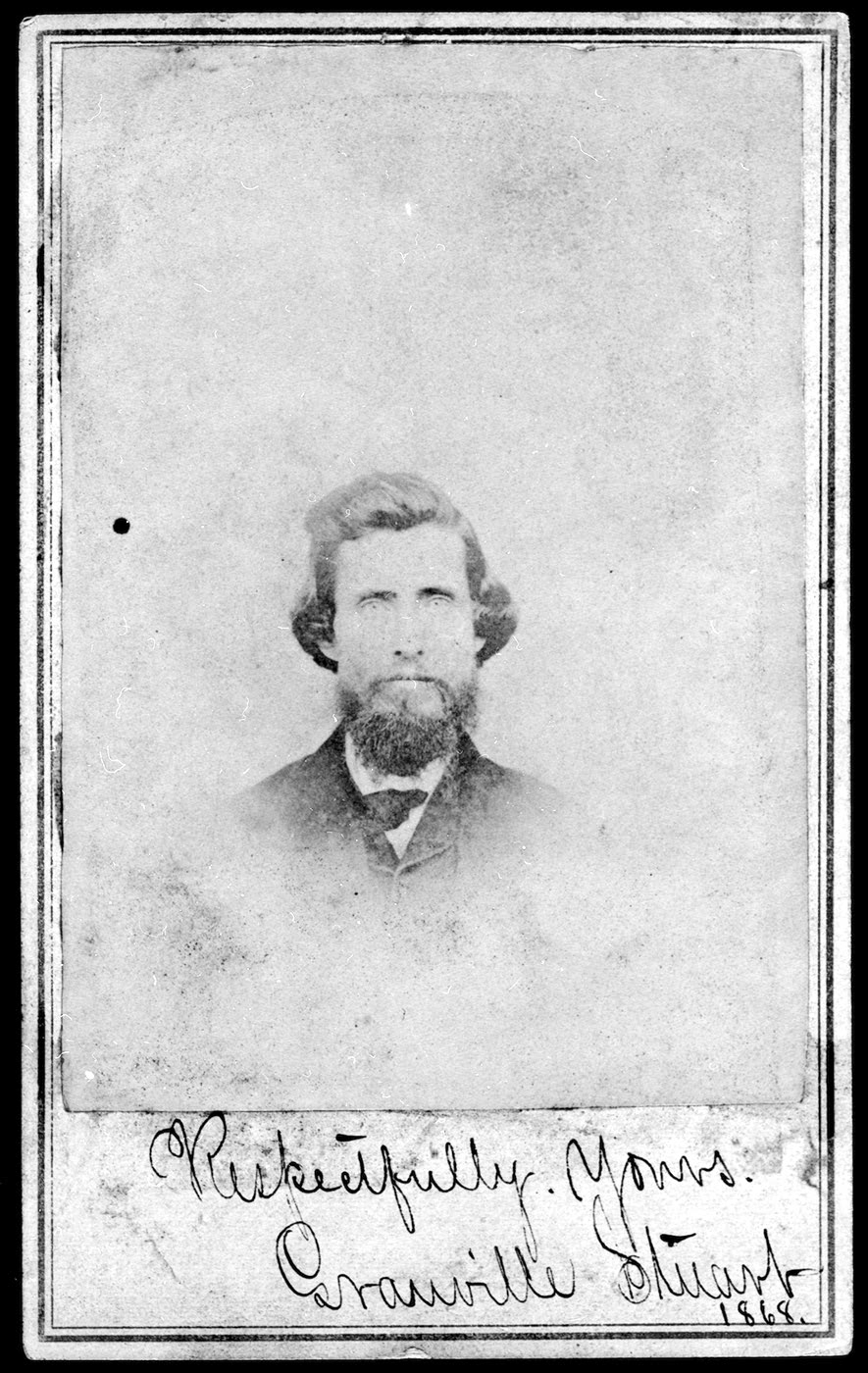
Granville Stuart, 1868

Granville Stuart was born August 27, 1834, in Harrison County, Virginia (after the civil war this area became part of West Virginia), to parents Robert and Nancy C. Stuart. He was their second son and brother to their first son, James Stuart. In 1838, the Stuarts after a brief stay in Illinois, moved to Muscatine County, Iowa, near present-day West Liberty, Iowa. It was in frontier Iowa that a young Granville and his brother James learned to hunt, explore and respect the wilderness.

== California gold fields ==
In 1849, Granville's father Robert made his way to the California gold fields as a Forty-niner but had little luck. In 1851 he returned to the family in Iowa. In the spring of 1852 Granville and his brother James accompanied their father west on the Oregon Trail back to California. By the summer of 1853 Robert was tired of gold prospecting and returned to Iowa. The brothers Granville and James stayed in the Sacramento area to make their own life. After failing to strike it rich in Sacramento, they moved to Yreka in June 1854 and the Klamath River valley in 1855 in search of gold. Because of troubles with hostile Rogue River and Klamath Indian tribes in northern California, Granville and James enlisted as scouts in the First California Mounted Riflemen for three dollars a day to fight Indians in the Rogue River Wars in February 1856. Their military career lasted about a month without any encounter with hostile Indians. They returned to Yreka to prospect but by the spring of 1857 had decided to return overland to the family in Iowa.

== The road to Montana ==
Granville and James, along with nine other travelers, were enroute east when Granville fell seriously ill in southern Idaho. Granville was too ill to travel so James stayed with him while the others went east. By the time Granville recovered, it was too late in the year to continue east over the Rocky Mountains. The brothers could not winter over in southern Idaho nor could they seek refuge in Salt Lake City because of the ongoing conflict between the United States and the Mormons called the Mormon War. Instead they befriended a former fur trapper Jake Meek who wintered a small cattle herd in the Beaverhead Valley. On October 10, 1857, Granville and James Stuart and Jake Meek crossed Monida Pass 200 miles north into the Beaverhead Valley and what was to become Montana Territory in 1864. They established a camp along the Beaverhead River near present-day Dillon, Montana. Others were already in the valley. Many former fur traders had adopted the practice trading one good cow or oxen for two trail weary animals on the Oregon Trail during the summer. They overwintered the animals in the Beaverhead to get them healthy for the next summer. One of these traders was French-Canadian Richard Grant, father of Johnny Grant who established the Grant Ranch in Deer Lodge in 1862.

For three years, the Stuart brothers traded cattle, horses and other goods between the Big Hole valley, the Beaverhead-Deerlodge Valley and Fort Bridger in Southern Wyoming. In the fall of 1860, along with their friend Reece Andersen, the Stuarts decided to move north into the Deer Lodge Valley. They established a camp on Gold Creek (Benetsee Creek), where in 1852 a French prospector, Francois Finley (Benetsee) had discovered gold. In the spring of 1858, while doing a bit of prospecting along Gold Creek, the Stuarts along with Reece Anderson found enough gold to make them want to return.

== Settling Deer Lodge, Montana ==
In 1861 the Stuarts decided to settle permanently in the Deer Lodge Valley along the Clark Fork River and Mullan Road. The road gave the Stuarts good access to supplies at Fort Benton 187 miles (301 km) to the east and from Walla Walla 433 miles (697 km) to the west. They built a small cabin along Gold Creek. Many other prospectors joined in the rush to the Deer Lodge Valley in search of gold in the early 1860–1862. Johnny Grant in 1859 built a cabin at Little Blackfoot Creek and later in 1862 a ranch at Cottonwood Creek. Those prospectors that congregated along Gold Creek called their community "American Fork", while at the other end of the valley, Grant called his growing community Cottonwood. With the discovery of gold in Alder Gulch in the summer of 1863, most of the inhabitants of the valley moved south to Virginia City including the Stuarts. However, the Stuarts wanted to sustain a presence in the Deer Lodge area. In 1864, James Stuart organized a townsite company and employed Colonel Walter W. deLacy to survey and plat a proper town on Cottonwood Creek. The town was christened Deer Lodge, Montana.

== Montana gold fields ==
In 1863, the gold strikes at Grasshopper Creek were drawing in hordes of prospectors. The Stuarts moved down to Bannack, Montana, to take advantage of the boom. In Bannack, Granville operated a butcher shop to supply miners with meat. While in Bannack, Stuart met Samuel Hauser and many other Montana pioneers who would become lifelong friends and in some cases like Hauser, business partners. Granville Stuart got his first taste of the Montana Vigilantes in 1863–1864 as the various members of the Henry Plummer gang were hanged in Virginia City.

== Politician and civic leader ==
Over the course of his life, Granville Stuart served in a variety of public offices. At one time or the other he was the president of the Deer Lodge Town Committee, chairman of the Deer Lodge County Commission, a trustee in numerous school districts, the College of Montana Montana's first, and the Montana Territorial Prison. He served five terms on the Montana Territorial Legislative Assembly. He was a lieutenant colonel in the territorial militia. In the 1890s, he was a state land agent. He was the head librarian in the Butte Public Library between 1905 and 1914. He was a founding member of the Society of Montana Pioneers formed in 1884 and served as its president in 1886.

== Author ==
Granville Stuart, from a young age kept copious notes, diaries, and journals. He routinely kept copies of most all his correspondence, much of which is preserved today by the Montana Historical Society, a society he helped found in 1864. He wrote several books on Montana and its pioneer history. His writings are considered to be seminal works on the history of the western United States.

... and in 1925 a selection of Stuart's diaries and remembrances was published as Forty Years on the Frontier, as seen in the Journals and Reminiscences of Granville Stuart, Goldminer, Merchant, Rancher, and Politician. Within a very few years the book achieved a reputation among professional historians, fiction writers, and western history buffs as a significant commentary and reliable source of information about the history of the western United States. Stuart's published journals have been relied upon as an encyclopedic reference for information nowhere else obtainable about many facets of western American history.

— Victor Dahl, Granville Stuart: Author and Subject of Western History (1970)

Upon publication of Forty Years On The Frontier, the New York Times wrote:

In the end he left a mass of diaries and memoirs, from which a judicious selection has been made by Paul C. Philllps, who has done excellently in correcting his principal's occasional lapses in dates. Still, despite the color and vigor of the present volume; the unpublished residue must contain much else of value. In such a rich mine as Granville Stuart, even the tailings should be worth rework at some time. As the incidents unfold themselves richly, the reader has the feeling, somehow of buried treasure just around the corner, of things left unsaid for lack of space, even though they richly deserve telling. Still, lovers of frontier lore should be grateful for the salvaging of so many tales of high emprise which deserve a place in the folklore of America.

— Arthur Pound, "The Grandfather of Montana" New York Times Book Review, June 13, 1926

== Weather Observer ==
Granville Stuart was an avid weather observer in the late 1800s for the Deer Lodge area and frequently submitted his observations to the Deer Lodge newspaper, "The New North-West". The New North-West gave a description of his passion in taking observations:

Returned. -Mr. Granville Stuart returned yesterday from his two week's trip in the mountains, whence he had been to take observations from some of the loftiest peaks in the range. There is no gentleman in Montana who takes a deeper interest in its welfare, or more pains in gathering valuable statistical information in regard to the climate and resources of the Territory than Mr. Stuart, and we expect to be able to present a graphic description of his recent exploits in our next issue.

— The New North-West, 24 Sep 1869 Page 3

=== Works ===
- Stuart, Granville (1865). Montana As It Is-Being a General description of its Resources, both Mineral and Agricultural.
- Stuart, Granville (1925). Paul C. Phillips (ed.). Forty Years On the Frontier as seen in the Journals and Reminiscences of Granville Stuart, gold-miner, trader, merchant, rancher and politician. The Arthur H. Clark Company, Cleveland.
  - Stuart, Granville (1977). Paul C. Phillips (ed.). Pioneering in Montana-The Making of a State, 1864–1887. Lincoln, Neb.: University of Nebraska Press. ISBN 978-0803209336. Reprint of Vol II of Forty Years on the Frontier
- Stuart, Granville (1963). Diary and Sketchbook of a Journey to "America" in 1866 and Return Trip up the Missouri River to Fort Benton, Montana. Los Angeles: Dawson's Book Shop.
- Russell, Charles M. (1919). Studies of Western Life, with Descriptions By Granville Stuart. Granville Stuart (illustrator). Spokane, Wash.: J. L. Robbins Co.

== Cattleman ==
In 1879, Granville Stuart was working as a bookkeeper in his old friend Samuel T. Hauser's First National Bank in Helena, Montana. Stuart and Hauser had known each other since 1862 when they were together in the gold fields. Stuart was aware of the burgeoning cattle business on the open range and encouraged Hauser to get involved. Hauser put together a deal with Helena banker Andrew J. Davis that created the Davis, Hauser and Stuart (DHS) cattle company. Stuart was a minor partner with an investment of $20,000 which he borrowed from Hauser. Davis and Hauser made Stuart the general manager of the DHS brand.

In the spring and summer of 1879, Stuart bought cattle from the Beaverhead valley in Montana and from Oregon. By April 1880, Stuart had acquired approximately 9400 head of cattle at a cost of $141,327 (~$3.93 million in 2024). By July 1879 he had located the site of the DHS on 800 acres (320 ha) on the southern slopes of the Judith Range northeast of the current town of Lewistown, Montana near Flat Willow Creek in what is now Fergus County, Montana. Although surrounded by open range, the ranch was located close to Fort Maginnis which provided both protection from a limited Indian threat but a ready market for cattle. However, this proximity to Fort Maginnis proved to be a major problem as the army claimed rights to all the hay land surrounding the fort, including that of the DHS ranch. The dispute went on for several years before the army finally returned control of the hay land to the DHS in May 1882.

In the summer of 1884, Granville Stuart gained notoriety as the leader of a secretive group of vigilantes known as "Stuart's Stranglers." Horse thieves and cattle rustlers were prevalent on the open range at the time so the ranchers, with the tacit approval of the Montana Stockgrowers Association, took steps to capture and kill the thieves. In 1884, Stuart's group killed up to 20 rustlers. Regional newspapers hostile to the cattlemen rumored and speculated they may have killed up to 75 rustlers and squatters, but there's no historical evidence to support that speculation. In 1885, Granville Stuart was elected president of the stockgrowers association.

Granville and Awbonnie with their children created a good life on the DHS ranch. But on a financial basis, Granville's fortunes turned during the Winter of 1886–1887. Over grazing on the open range in the previous decade, a severe drought during the summer and an unusually harsh winter created a disaster on the open range in Montana. By April 1887, the DHS had lost up to 60% of its 40,000 cattle to winter kill and the remaining stock was in bad shape. It was a financial disaster and the DHS ranch never prospered again. In 1890, Granville left the ranch. When it was finally sold in 1895, Granville still had debts to Sam Hauser's bank in Helena of $3500 (~$135,450 in 2025).

== Diplomat ==
Granville Stuart's long friendship with Samuel Hauser, who as a former Montana Territorial Governor, had close ties with the Democratic party and President Grover Cleveland, allowed Stuart to lobby Hauser for help in getting a government appointment. In 1893 shortly after the start of Cleveland's second term, Hauser helped secure a diplomatic appointment for Stuart. In 1894, at the age of 60, Granville Stuart was appointed Minister Plenipotentiary to Uruguay and Paraguay.

On August 25, 1897, Stuart was at the side of Uruguayan president Juan Idiarte Borda when he was assassinated in Montevideo by a follower of a rival political group during an Independence Day parade.

== Family ==
At the age of 27, Granville married a twelve-year-old Shoshone Native American girl named Awbonnie Tookanka on April 15, 1862. There are several variations on the spelling of her first name in history books: Aubony, Awbony, etc. Also her daughter, Mary, stated in later years that her mother's last name was Stookaraka. Awbonnie bore Granville eleven children—Kate, Tom, Charlie, Mary, Elizabeth, Emma, George, Eddie, Harry, Sam and Irene. Emma and George died in infancy. Awbonnie and Granville remained married until her death in 1888 from puerperal fever at age 41.

On January 8, 1890, Granville married twenty-six-year-old Allis Belle Brown, his children's former school teacher at the DHS ranch. At this time Allis prompted Granville to give up his Shoshone Native American children to the local St. Ignatius Mission. Allis and Granville never had any offspring of their own. Allis Belle survived Granville and died in Hamilton, Montana, on March 31, 1947.

Granville and his brother James were partners in most things since they were teenagers and were rarely apart until January 1871 when James left Deer Lodge to operate a trading business at the government trading post on the Milk River, Fort Browning. He left his wife and three sons in the care of Granville and Awbonnie. In June 1873, Fort Browning was closed and James was transferred to Fort Peck. He was ill at the time and succumbed to liver disease on September 26, 1873. Granville recovered his body at Fort Peck and returned James to Deer Lodge, where he was buried on November 5, 1873. Mourners at the funeral included pioneers Samuel Hauser, Nathaniel P. Langford and Wilbur Sanders.

== Later years and death ==
Upon returning to Montana from South America, Granville's prospects were slim. A change in administration in Washington, D.C. meant there was no further opportunities for an appointment with the Federal government. Stuart had accumulated little wealth during his 40 plus years in Montana and still had some debt problems associated with his friend Sam Hauser. Granville and Belle settled in Butte, Montana. In 1905 his good friend and Copper King, William A. Clark, helped secure him a post as the head librarian for the Butte Public Library, a post he held until 1914. For a time, the Stuarts operated a rooming house called "The Dorothy" in Butte. During his time in Butte, Stuart compiled most of the writings found in Forty Years on the Frontier which Belle was able to see published in 1925. In 1915–17, Montana participated in the Panama–California Exposition in San Diego, California. William Clark had donated $10,000 toward the construction of "The Montana Building". Clark insisted that Granville Stuart be selected to represent Montana at the Exposition, which he did for its first year. In 1917, Belle and Granville moved into a rooming house in Missoula, Montana while Granville worked on his memoir and a never published pioneer history of Montana. In failing health, his last public appearance was in September 1918 during a meeting of the Montana Pioneers Society in Anaconda, Montana. On the morning of October 2, 1918, "Mr. Montana", Granville Stuart suffered heart failure in his home and died. His funeral was held in Deer Lodge, Montana, on October 6, 1918. Among the mourners were his daughter Mary and son Samuel, William Clark, Andrew Fergus (son of pioneer James Fergus) and countless other friends and oldtimers who knew Granville in some way. He is buried in Deer Lodge, Montana next to his pioneer brother James Stuart.

== Legacy ==
Granville Stuart was a 2008 Legacy Inductee into the Montana Cowboy Hall of Fame in Big Timber, Montana. Granville Stuart Elementary School is located in Deer Lodge. The Liberty Ship S.S. Granville Stuart was commissioned July 11, 1943. In 1966, he was inducted into the Hall of Great Westerners of the National Cowboy & Western Heritage Museum.
