= Society of Montana Pioneers =

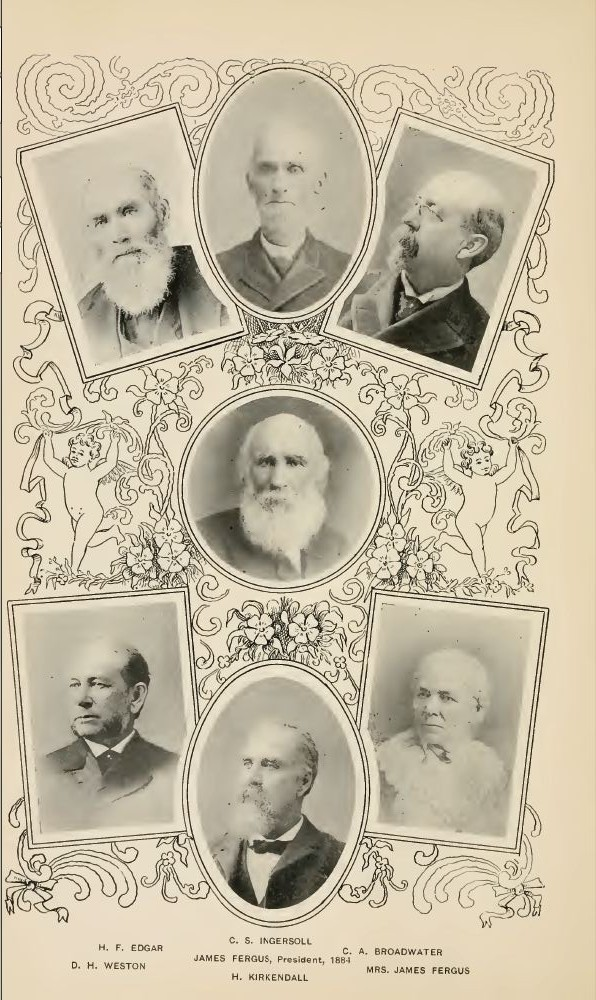
- Officers, 1884
- Successor: Sons and Daughters of Montana Pioneers
- Formation: September 11, 1884; 142 years ago
- Dissolved: August 25, 1962
- Website: www.sonsanddaughtersmontanapioneers.com

The Society of Montana Pioneers was founded on September 11, 1884, in Helena, Montana, to honor and document the histories of Montana pioneers who were resident in the territory at the time it became a Montana Territory, May 26, 1864. In 1909, the society changed its membership rules to admit pioneers who were resident the territory prior to December 31, 1868. In 1899, the society boasted 1536 active members out of a one time total of 1808. The society did not consider individuals who were assigned to Montana on military duties, individuals who were deemed outlaws such as Henry Plummer of Bannack, or Indians as eligible for membership in the society.

On August 18, 1892, a junior society was founded—The Sons and Daughters of Montana Pioneers—to perpetuate the tradition of the pioneers by their progeny.

== History ==
In the summer of 1884, many Montana pioneers were unsatisfied with the Montana Historical Society and its more formal approach to the preservation of Montana History. In response, they decided to form a more populist society and made this call:

It having been suggested and urged by a large number of the Pioneers of Montana that the undersigned issue a call for the assembly of the Pioneers of Montana for the purpose of organizing a Pioneers' Association or Society, the task is heartily undertaken under the belief that it will bring forth good fruit. I have been unable, thus far, to see or hear from many of the Pioneers, and in appending their names to the call I do it from the fact that I am personally acquainted with nearly all of them, and by virtue of acquaintance take the liberty of using their names. To Col. W. F. Sanders, of Helena, Hon. Washington Stapleton, of Butte, and Hon. Joe A. Browne, of Darling, I am under obligations for timely suggestions. To Captain Mills, of the Deer Lodge, New North West, I am indebted for timely hints. The brethren of the Territorial Press will contribute toward the success of organizing a Pioneers' Association by giving the following call as much publicity as in their judgment may seem most meet and proper.

— John Russell Wilson. Dillon, Montana, July 26th, 1884.

By September 1884, sufficient numbers of pioneers had committed to forming the society. A meeting was scheduled on September 10, 1884, at the Court House in Helena, Montana. Sixty-six pioneers from eleven Montana counties signed the notice.

=== County societies ===
Society members living in Montana counties with a large number of members formed local county orgy sessions.

- Pioneers' Society of Beaverhead County–1887
- Gallatin County Pioneer Society No. 1–November 23, 1893
- Jefferson County Society of Pioneers of the State of Montana–December 10, 1897
- Lewis and Clarke [sic] County Society of Montana Pioneers–1897
- Pioneer Society of Madison County–1888
- The Teton County Society of Montana Pioneers–January 23, 1895

=== Officers ===
1884–1899 1900–1961

- 1884
  - President: James Fergus
  - Recording Secretary: George W. Irvin, II
  - Corresponding Secretary: Wilbur F. Sanders
  - Treasurer: Samuel T. Hauser
- 1885
  - President: Walter W. DeLacy
  - Recording Secretary: John Russell Wilson
  - Corresponding Secretary: Cornelius Hedges
- 1886
  - President: Granville Stuart
  - Recording Secretary: James U. Sanders
  - Corresponding Secretary: Cornelius Hedges
  - Treasurer: Samuel T. Hauser
- 1887
  - President: Frank H. Woody
  - Secretary: James U. Sanders
  - Treasurer: Samuel T. Hauser
- 1888
  - President: Wilbur F. Sanders
  - Secretary: Cornelius Hedges
  - Treasurer: Samuel T. Hauser
- 1889
  - President: Anton M. Holter
  - Secretary: Cornelius Hedges
  - Treasurer: Theodore H. Kleinschmidt
- 1890
  - President: William A. Clark
  - Secretary: Cornelius Hedges
  - Treasurer: Henry M. Parchen
- 1891
  - President: Samuel Word
  - Secretary: Cornelius Hedges
  - Treasurer: Theodore H. Kleinschmidt
- 1892
  - President: Walter Cooper
  - Secretary: Charles D. Curtis
  - Treasurer: Cornelius Hedges
- 1893
  - President: Walter Cooper
  - Secretary: Charles D. Curtis
  - Treasurer: Cornelius Hedges
- 1894
  - President: John T. Conner
  - Secretary: Charles D. Curtis
  - Treasurer: Theodore H. Kleinschmidt
- 1895
  - President: Conrad Kohrs
  - Secretary: Theophilus Muffly
  - Treasurer: Theodore H. Kleinschmidt
- 1896
  - President: William L. Steele
  - Secretary: Theophilus Muffly
  - Treasurer: Theodore H. Kleinschmidt
- 1897
  - President: Nickolas Kessler
  - Secretary: Theophilus Muffly
  - Treasurer: Theodore H. Kleinschmidt
- 1898
  - President: Henry Elling
  - Secretary: James U. Sanders
  - Treasurer: Anton M. Holter
- 1899
  - President: Henry Elling
  - Secretary: James U. Sanders
  - Treasurer: Anton M. Holter
- 1900–President: Henry F. Edgar
- 1901–President: Augustus F. Graeter
- 1902–President: Timothy E. Collins
- 1903–President: O'Dillon Whitford
- 1904–President: Cornelius Hedges
- 1905–President: John P. Thomas
- 1906–President: Paul McCormick
- 1907–President: Charles S. Warren
- 1908–President: Andrew J. Fisk
- 1909–President: Warren C. Gillette
- 1910–President: William Y. Pemberton
- 1911–President: Rod D. Leggat
- 1912–President: Mortimer H. Lott
- 1913–President: Martin Maginnis
- 1914–President: James M. Page
- 1915–President: John W. Blair
- 1916–President: George W. Morse
- 1917–President: Frank D. Brown
- 1918–President: Charles W. Hoffman
- 1919–President: William A. Clark
- 1920–President: John F. Bishop
- 1921–President: Charles W. Cook
- 1922–President: William A. Coleman
- 1923–President: Richard Lockey
- 1924–President: Thomas R. Moore
- 1925–President: Mary Valiton
- 1926–President: Alfred W. Orton
- 1927–President: Patrick Carney and Mrs. M. F. Trask
- 1928–President: Wylls A. Hedges
- 1929–President: Molly Kline
- 1930–President: David Heilgn
- 1931–President: W. C. Cerron
- 1932–President: Miles Cavanaugh
- 1933–President: Merling Held
- 1934–President: Henry Evans
- 1935–President: Augusta Trask
- 1936–President: Andrew Erickson
- 1937–President: John H. Miller
- 1938–President: Will Cave
- 1940–President: Jeannie Ennis Chowing
- 1941–President: Mary Evans
- 1942–President: Joseph Larson
- 1943–President: Joseph Larson
- 1944–President: Augusta Trask
- 1945–President: William L. Milligan
- 1946–President: Henry M. Morgan
- 1947–President: William K. Burns
- 1948–President: Julia R. Elledge
- 1949–President: Mary Doane (wife of Gustavus Cheyney Doane)
- 1950–President: Byron Wickham
- 1951–President: Lumen W. Allen
- 1952–President: Tom H. McCauley
- 1953–President: Fannie Davis Ennis
- 1954–President: Fannie Davis Ennis
- 1955–President: Helen Allen Conrad
- 1956–President: Henry R. Daems
- 1957–President: Julie Mae Stock
- 1958–President: Julie Mae Stock
- 1959–President: Josephine Gilg
- 1960–President: Luman Allen
- 1961–President: Luman Allen

== Sons and Daughters of Montana Pioneers ==
On August 18, 1892, during their annual meeting, the Montana Pioneers established The Sons and Daughters of Montana Pioneers as a society to preserve the legacy of the original pioneers. Membership in the society is open to any linear descendants of the original members of the Society of Montana Pioneers. The Sons and Daughters Society was instrumental in obtaining land for the construction of the Veterans and Pioneer Memorial Building at the state capitol in Helena. The records of both societies are maintained there.

== Publications ==
In 1899, James U. Sanders, long-time secretary of the society and the Montana Historical Society librarian organized the publication of Volume I of Society of Montana Pioneers-Constitution, Members, Officers with Portraits and Maps ... The volume details the foundation of the society, lists the officers up to 1898 along with details of the various country societies. It includes short biographical sketches of members from each county. Other than short newspaper articles, the society did not publish another volume.

George Frederick Cope, son of Charles and Caroline Cope; born at Boonville, Cooper County, Missouri, March i6th, 1842. Place of departure for Montana, Black Hawk, Colorado; route traveled, across the plains, up North Platte, Green River, Fort Bridger, Soda Springs, and Snake River; arrived at Bannack July 4th, 1863. Occupation, miner. Residence, Bon Accord. Member House of Representatives, Sixth Session, 1869-70, Territorial Legislative Assembly.

— Typical biographical sketch

In 2001, under the editorial leadership of Linda Wostrel, Historian of The Sons and Daughters of Montana Pioneers, a volume of 91 biographical remembrances was published under the title: Dreams Across The Divide-Stories of Montana Pioneers with a foreword by Stephen Ambrose, author of Undaunted Courage: Meriwether Lewis, Thomas Jefferson, and the Opening of the American West (1996).

== Dissolution ==
On August 24–25, 1962, during their 78th annual meeting, held in Butte, the eight surviving members of the society and The Sons and Daughters of Montana Pioneers elected to dissolve the original society. Lumen W. Allen, the last survivor of the Society of Montana Pioneers died on February 19, 1970, at the age of 102 in Butte.
