= Montana Cowboy Hall of Fame =

Non-profit organization to honor Montana's western heritage

Coordinates: 48°05′24″N 105°38′26″W

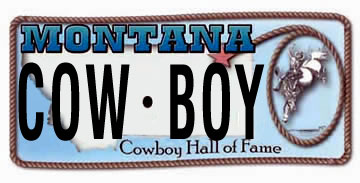
A mockup of the Montana Cowboy Hall of Fame specialty license plate.

The Montana Cowboy Hall of Fame is a 501(c)(3) hall of fame organization. Its stated goal is to ""To honor our cowboy way of life, American Indian cultures, and our collective Montana western heritage. It confers the honour of induction on an annual list of distinguished individuals. The Montana Cowboy Hall of Fame is currently colocated with the Charles M Russel Museum in Great Falls Montana. Fundraising efforts include a specialty car license plate, The hall of fame was granted US$0.5 million in state funds for site development and project planning during a 2007 special session of the legislature.

A previous proposal was to be located in Wolf Point, Montana, as designated by the State of Montana in 2003. But the Charles M Russel Museum was able to provide space in conjunction with their permanent "Tales from the Saddle: Come Ride along Exhbit" |url=https://cmrussell.org/exhibitions-2/%7Cwebsite=C.M Russel museum: Exhibits |access-date=November 19, 2025}}</ref>

== Inductees ==
The first round of legacy award inductees was announced on April 8, 2008. Trustees from the twelve districts voted on the nominees to arrive at 51 foundational members of the hall of fame. This initial round includes nominees who made their impact on Montana's western heritage between 1860 and 1920. Subsequent inductees are announced annually.

=== District 2 (Dawson, Garfield, McCone, Prairie, Richland, and Wibaux counties) ===
==== 2008 ====
- Evelyn Cameron
- Bob Fudge
- N Bar N Ranch
- Undem Ranch
- Ralph R. Whitlock
- XIT Ranch

==== 2009 ====
- Daniel & Susan Haughian

=== District 3 (Carter, Custer, Fallon, Powder River, Rosebud, and Treasure counties) ===
==== 2008 ====
- Ord Clinton Ames
- Casey Barthelmess
- T.W. "Wiley" King
- Lisle D. Powell
- David and Ijkalaka Russell
- William Wiseham "W.W." Terrett

=== District 4 (Blaine, Chouteau, Hill, and Liberty counties) ===
==== 2008 ====
- "Long George" Francis
- Marie Gibson
- James "Jim" McCoy
- Honora Matilda Redwing
- Winfield Scott Young

==== 2009 ====
- Louis Shambo

=== District 5 (Cascade, Glacier, Pondera, Teton and Toole counties) ===
==== 2008 ====
- Peggy Bell
- Charles M. Russell

==== 2009 ====
- James Willard Schultz

=== District 6 (Fergus, Golden Valley, Judith Basin, Musselshell, Petroleum, and Wheatland counties) ===
==== 2008 ====
- E.C. "Teddy Blue" Abbott
- James Fergus
- DHS Ranch
- Granville Stuart
- George R. "Two Dot" Wilson

==== 2009 ====
- W.E. "Limestone" Wilson
- William I. Hughes

=== District 7 (Big Horn, Carbon, Stillwater, Sweet Grass and Yellowstone counties) ===
==== 2008 ====
- Chief Plenty Coups - Chiilaphuchissaaleesh (Buffao Bull Facing the Wind)
- Dilworth Cattle Company
- Charles C. Huyck & The Roberts Ranch
- Charles McDonnell
- William Franklin McLeod

==== 2009 ====
- John B. Kendrick

=== District 8 (Broadwater, Jefferson, and Lewis and Clark counties) ===
==== 2008 ====
- 2nd US Cavalry
- Broadwater Hotel and Natatorium
- Thomas Cruse
- John M. Frey
- General Thomas Francis Meagher
- Sons and Daughters of the Montana Pioneers

==== 2009 ====
Fannie Sperry Steele

=== District 9 (Gallatin, Meagher, and Park counties) ===
==== 2008 ====
- Charles Anceney
- Charles M. Bair
- Henry Heeb
- Nelson Brothers - Monroe "Beaver" & Frank "Doc"
- Nelson Story

==== 2009 ====
- Byron Roger Sherman

=== Districts 10, 11, and 12 (Lake, Lincoln, Sanders, Mineral, Missoula, Ravalli, Deer Lodge, Beaverhead, Silver Bow, Granite, Madison and Powell counties) ===
==== 2008 ====
- Myron D. Jeffers
- Conrad Kohrs Ranch
- Nevada City Hotel
- Henry Plummer
- The Round Barn
- Spokane - 1889 Kentucky Derby winner

==== 2009 ====
- Frank Bird Linderman
- The Sacred Medicine Tree of the Salish
- Clyde Hunter Smith
