= Stuart's Stranglers =

19th century vigilante group in Montana Territory, USA

Stuart's Stranglers was a vigilante group in Montana that was founded by wealthy ranchers in 1884 and led by Granville Stuart in response to widespread livestock theft at that time. They were also less commonly known as the "Montana Stranglers".

== History ==
=== Background ===
Cattle thieves posed a significant threat to the work of ranchers in Montana Territory. The rustlers operated well-organized networks that stole stock in one region and sold it in another, often across the Canadian border. By the late 1870s, ranchers began to form stockgrowers' associations to lobby the territorial legislature for legislation to curb the theft. At the 1883 legislative session, the cattlemen successfully lobbied for a bill that placed a bounty on predators such as coyotes and wolves. But the bill they desired most failed. House Bill 49 would have created a board of five livestock commissioners and hired six inspectors. Further, it would have invested the inspectors with the power to arrest suspected livestock thieves without a warrant. Governor John Schuyler Crosby vetoed the bill on the grounds that it unfairly taxed all property and that it gave too much freedom to inspectors. Faced with a rustling industry unchecked by legal means, many ranchers proceeded to take the law into their own hands.

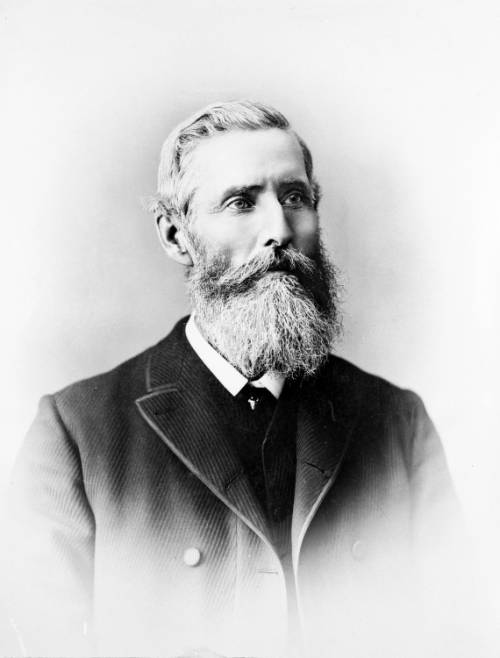
Granville Stuart, 1883

Granville Stuart originally organized a group of ranchers and cowboys in response to the theft of his stallion and 35 steers. The 14 men who gathered at his ranch in the Musselshell region called themselves a "Vigilante Committee", akin to the vigilance committees that formed in the mining camps of western Montana. They became known as "Stuart's Stranglers".

=== Activities ===
Their missions were directly led by William "Floppin Bill" Cantrell. Throughout their short existence their membership during chases would fluctuate between 17 and 40 men, depending on the location of the thieves and the day of the week.

Stuart's Stranglers tracked down livestock thieves in Montana. The men they caught were either shot in a gun fight or lynched. Many of the bodies they hanged were found with placards on their person that usually read "Horse Thief" or "Cattle Thief." They were known for being extremely deadly and efficient. Not only did the group kill rustlers and thieves during their search, but also (allegedly) illegal range squatters scattered throughout the frontier which would become a Montana range war.

=== Battle of Bates Point ===
On July 8, Stuart and his group were hunting down Stringer Jack and his gang of rustlers in Musselshell River. Jack's gang managed to get across the river with some stolen horses, and the Stranglers were hotly and stealthily in pursuit. As the gang rested in a log cabin owned by Old Man James, the Stranglers surrounded the place, released the horses so the men inside couldn't escape, and promptly demanded their surrender. The gang however, remained defiant, and a bloody gunfight soon erupted. During the heat of the battle, the Stranglers set fire to the cabin, resulting in nine rustlers dead in the ensuing shootout. Stuart described the battle:

Two of the vigilantes crawled up and set fire to the hay stack and the cabin. The men inside stationed themselves at port holes and kept up the fight until they were all killed or burned up. The cabin burned to the ground. The tent was near the river bank and almost surrounded by thick brush and it was easier to escape from it than to get out of the cabin. Stringer Jack crawled under the tent and reached a dense clump of willows from which he made his last stand. Dixie Burr, his arm smashed by a rifle bullet, hid in an old dry well until dark and then made his escape. Rose, Nickerson, Edwards and Swift Bill also slipped out of the tent and got away in the dark. Every one of the outlaws in the gun battle at Bates Point was either killed or wounded with the exception of Edwards and Nickerson, who—for the time being—got away unscathed.

=== Final activities ===
After they staged their final attack at Bates Point where 160 head of cattle was being held, there were 69 remaining after Stuart and his men retrieved their own cattle. Stuart brought them all to his ranch and advertised for all the remaining animals to be picked up by their owners. Shortly afterwards they dissolved the group. In just a few months they had returned over 300 horses to their owners. In 1884, Stuart's group killed up to 20 rustlers. Regional newspapers rumored and speculated they may have killed up to 75-100 rustlers and squatters, but there's no historical evidence to support that speculation. In 1885, Granville Stuart was elected President of the stockgrowers association.

Stuart's Stranglers gained so much notoriety during their time that Theodore Roosevelt had requested to join them. Granville Stuart turned him down though, he was afraid that the group would receive much unwanted public attention.

== Controversies ==
Stuart's Stranglers, like other vigilante groups, have been criticized by some historians for the extrajudicial justice they meted out without due process of law. There is also debate about whether they actually were effective at reducing the overall rate of horse and cattle theft.
