= Goldcreek, Montana =

- Census-designated place
- Location within Montana Location within the United States
- Coordinates: 46°35′02″N 112°55′42″W
- Country: United States
- State: Montana
- County: Powell

Area
  - Total: 0.20 sq mi (0.51 km^{2})
  - Land: 0.20 sq mi (0.51 km^{2})
  - Water: 0 sq mi (0.00 km^{2})
- Elevation: 4,196 ft (1,279 m)

Population (2020)
  - Total: 9
  - Density: 46/sq mi (17.8/km^{2})
- Time zone: UTC-7 (Mountain (MST))
  - Summer (DST): UTC-6 (MDT)
- ZIP Code: 59733 (Gold Creek)
- Area code: 406
- FIPS code: 30-31825
- GNIS feature ID: 2806661

Goldcreek is an unincorporated community and census-designated place (CDP) in Powell County, Montana, United States. It is in the southwestern part of the county, 0.4 miles (0.6 km) south of Interstate 90's Exit 166. Via I-90, Garrison is 8 miles (13 km) to the southeast and Drummond is 12 miles (19 km) to the northwest.

Goldcreek is in the valley of the Clark Fork River, about 1 mile (1.6 km) downstream (west) of the confluence of Gold Creek with the river.

The community was first listed as a CDP prior to the 2020 census. As of the 2020 census, Goldcreek had a population of 9.

== Demographics ==
Historical population
Census	Pop.	Note	%±
2020	9		—
U.S. Decennial Census
