= Gold Creek (Washington) =

Creek in Stevens County, Washington

Coordinates: 48°57′17″N 117°51′53″W

Gold Creek is a creek in Stevens County, Washington. Gold Creek flows into Sheep Creek, a tributary of the Columbia. The Gold Creek Basin is located around Gold Creek.

== Lost Doukhobor Ledge ==
In the fall of 1929, a lightning strike caused a fire in Gold Creek Basin. The area is beyond Hubbard Ridge, north of Flagstaff Mountain. A crew of twenty-five men was sent from Rossland, British Columbia to help put the fire out. Most of the men were Doukhobors. The fire jumped the fireguard that the men had built and the men’s camp was engulfed in flames. The firefighters ran for their lives. Later, after a headcount the men realized two of their crew were missing. In the morning the two Doukhobors who were missing joined their crew. The Doukhobors related how they managed to keep ahead of the flames. They spent the night at the base of a rock slide and discovered a vein of galena. The Doukhobors took samples back with them. A workman, named Ray Wiley, remembers "it was fine-grained argentite – high-grade silver ore." The ore was assayed at CM&S Co. assay office in Trail, British Columbia. The ore assayed at over 1,000 ounces (28.4 kg) of silver a ton – bonanza ore. In 1930, the Doukhobors accompanied with geologists returned, looking for the rock slide with the rich silver ledge of galena. They were unable to find it. Since then, many prospectors have searched Gold Creek Basin for the lost Doukhobor Ledge. All attempts to find the silver ledge have failed.
