= Gold Creek, Nevada =

Ghost town in Elko County, NV, US

Coordinates: 41°42′29″N 115°42′17″W

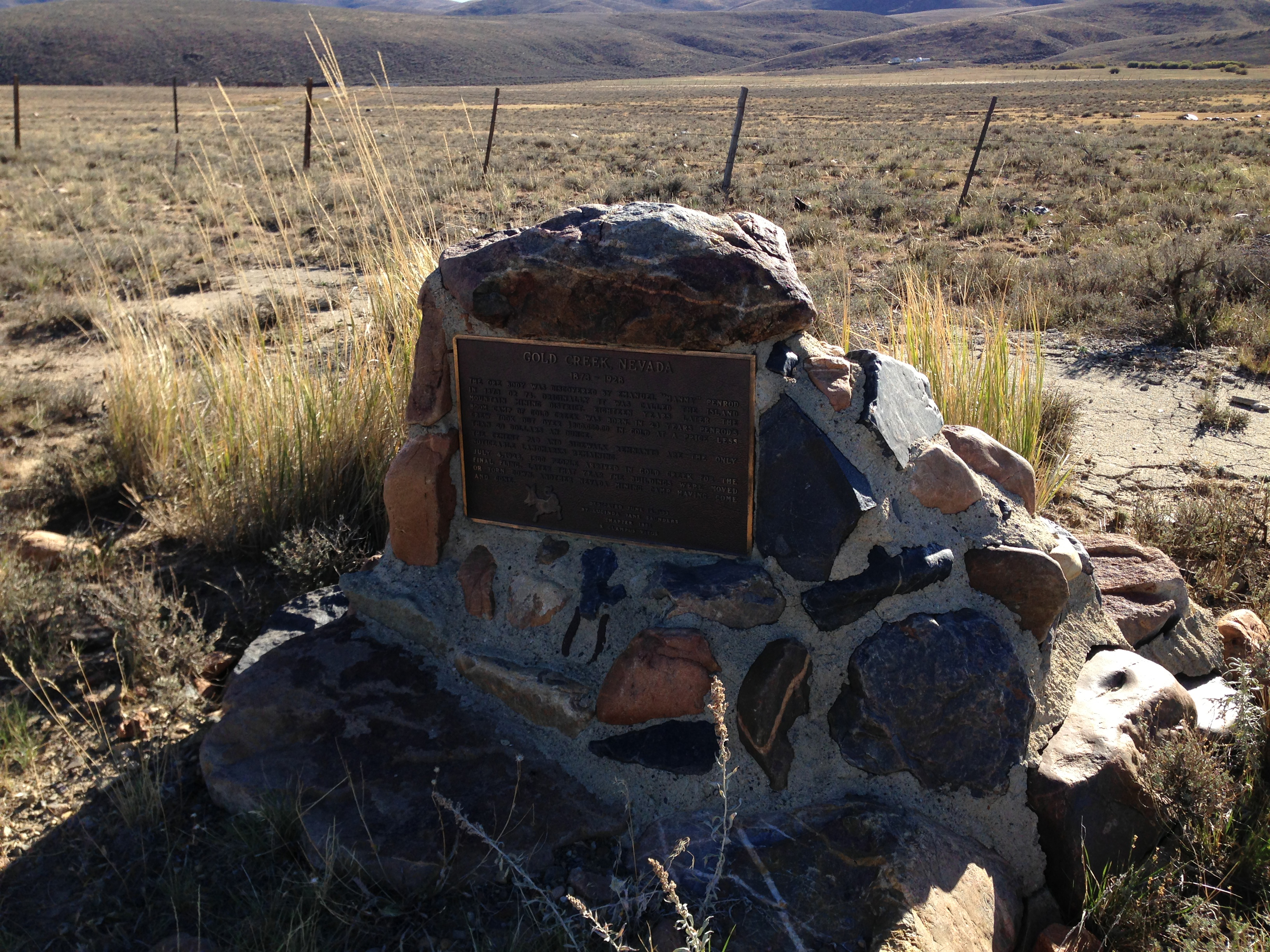
Historical marker for Gold Creek along Gold Creek Road, September 2014

Gold Creek is an extinct town in Elko County, Nevada, United States.

== History ==
A post office was established at Gold Creek in 1897, and remained in operation until 1929. The community was named for gold placer deposits near the original town site.

== See also ==
- List of ghost towns in Nevada
