= James Fergus =

American politician

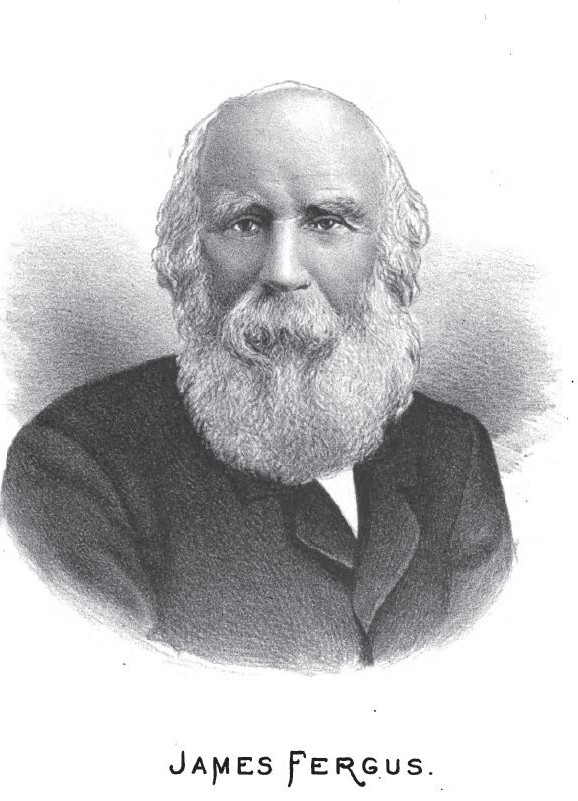
- James Fergus, ca 1885
- Born: October 8, 1813; Glassford, Lanarkshire, Scotland
- Died: June 5, 1902 (aged 88)
- Occupations: Businessman, cattleman, miner, politician

James Fergus (October 8, 1813 – June 5, 1902) was a miner, rancher, businessman and politician in Minnesota and Montana. He immigrated as a young man from Scotland and became a naturalized United States citizen. He helped develop the frontier in both territories, founding cities and counties.

In the book Progressive Men of Montana, Fergus is described as: "his main characteristics are a natural aptitude for mechanical enterprises, a sturdy independence of thought, a strict integrity of purpose and a love for study and good books."

== Early life ==
Fergus was born in 1813 in Lanarkshire, Scotland. At the age of 19 he moved to Canada. He lived there three years and learned the trade of millwright. Fergus immigrated to the United States in 1835. He did work in Green Bay, Wisconsin, Milwaukee, Chicago, and Buffalo Grove. He stopped working in the foundry and machine business due to poor health and became a member of the firm of Wheelock & Fergus, early paper manufacturers at Moline, Illinois. Around 1840 he built and operated powder mills at Savannah, Illinois.

Fergus was naturalized and obtained his citizenship in October 1842.

In 1845 Fergus married Pamelia Dillin in Moline, Illinois. They had four children: Andrew, Mary Agnes, Luella, and Lillie.

Around 1854 he moved to Minnesota. He was one of the founders of Little Falls, Minnesota and Fergus Falls in the same state.

In 1862 Fergus joined Capt. James L. Fisk's expedition to Bannack, Montana.

== Politics ==
After becoming a US citizen, Fergus became deeply interested in politics. In 1856, he was elected Judge of Probate for Morrison County, Minnesota Territory (Little Falls was in this county). Two years later, he was elected to a two-year term as Morrison County Treasurer.

Fergus moved with his family west to Montana Territory. He became involved in territorial and state politics. He was selected as the first judge in the miners' court in the Territory. He was appointed commissioner of Madison County. In 1869, Fergus was appointed to a vacant seat as county commissioner of Lewis and Clark County.

In 1873 and in 1875 Fergus served as a precinct chairman in Montana for the Republican Party. In 1879 he was elected to represent Fergus County in the Territorial House of Representatives. Fergus was instrumental to the Republican party in Montana, as chairman and through his writings in local newspapers.

In 1884 he participated in the constitutional convention in preparation for seeking admission of the territory as a state. At the same time, he promoted the organization of Fergus County and is considered its founder.

Fergus became the first president of the Society of Montana Pioneers in 1884.

== Business ==
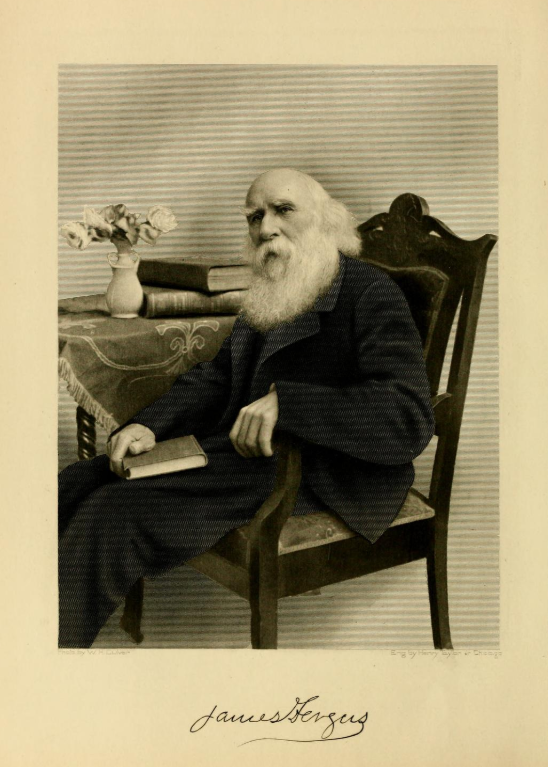

In 1895, Fergus and his son Andrew expanded their ranching business operation. They created a family corporation named Fergus Livestock and Land Company. It developed as one of biggest ranching operations in central Montana. Their ranch was located on Armells Creek in northeastern Fergus County. James died in 1902 and Andrew in 1928. Due to the loss of these business leaders and the economic strains of the Great Depression, heirs were forced to sell this exceptional ranch.

== Death ==
Fergus died June 5, 1902. His wife died October 6, 1887. Andrew Fergus died in 1928, shortly before the stock market crash and onset of the Great Depression.

== Legacy ==
Fergus was posthumously inducted into the Montana Cowboy Hall of Fame.
