= Samuel Thomas Hauser =

American politician

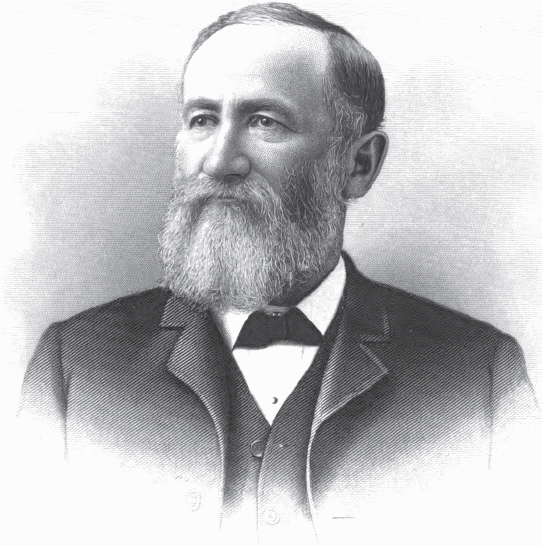

7th Governor of Montana Territory
- In office July 14, 1885 – February 7, 1887
- Nominated by: Grover Cleveland
- Preceded by: B. Platt Carpenter
- Succeeded by: Preston Leslie

Personal details
- Born: January 10, 1833 Falmouth, Kentucky
- Died: November 10, 1914 (aged 81) Helena, Montana
- Party: Democratic
- Spouse: Ellen Farrar

Samuel Thomas Hauser (January 10, 1833 – November 10, 1914) was an American industrialist, politician, and banker who was active in the development of Montana Territory. He made his first fortune in silver mines and railroads, but he lost everything in the Panic of 1893. He restored his fortune by building hydroelectric dams, only to lose it all again after his Hauser Dam burst. In addition to his many business interests, he was appointed the 7th Governor of the Montana Territory, serving from 1885 to 1887.

A complicated figure, Hauser engaged in fraud and through his First National Bank of Helena he stole over $2 million. On the other hand, Hauser was praised by his contemporaries for his undeniable contributions to the development of Montana Territory. His mines, smelters, railroads, and dams all stimulated the region's economy. One newspaper called him "Montana's greatest captain of industry, former chief executive, pioneer trailblazer, eminent financier, distinguished citizen and one of the choice and master spirits of the age."

== Early life ==
Hauser was born to Samuel Thomas and Mary Ann (Kennett) Hauser in Falmouth, Kentucky on January 10, 1833. His early education occurred locally at the Chittenden School while both his father, a judge and lawyer, and a cousin who had graduated from Yale University, oversaw his later education.

At the age of 19, Hauser went to work for the Kentucky Central Railroad. He then moved to Missouri in 1854, where he worked as a civil engineer for the railroads. He began as an assistant engineer for the Missouri Pacific and Northern Pacific railways and worked his way up to become chief engineer on the Lexington to Sedalia branch.

Hauser married Ellen Farrar of St. Louis in 1871. The marriage produced two children: Ellen and Samuel Thomas Jr.

== Montana ==
In early 1862, Hauser left his position with the railroads and boarded a steamboat for the journey up the Missouri River. He arrived at Fort Benton, Montana, in June and traveled overland toward the Salmon River to prospect for gold. Partway through the difficult journey, after hearing disappointing reports about the claims in the Salmon River area, he joined the gold rush at Bannack, Montana, where he arrived in August. The next year, his prospecting efforts took him down the Yellowstone River. During this expedition, Hauser's party was attacked by Indians, and Hauser himself was wounded. The bullet went through a thick notebook in his shirt pocket and lodged in a rib. He survived, and while he failed to find gold on the Yellowstone, other members of his party struck it rich at Alder Gulch. After the boom town of Virginia City sprang up in Alder Gulch, Hauser joined with Nathaniel P. Langford to establish one of the town's first banks, S. T. Hauser and Co, in 1865.

=== Territorial developer ===
Hauser himself never had success with prospecting. Instead, he made his first fortune through investments in mines, smelters, and railroads. He visited St. Louis in 1865 to raise money from investors. His efforts proved successful, and in 1866 he formed the St. Louis & Montana Mining Company and built Montana Territory's first smelter at Argenta. Hauser invested heavily in the silver mining industry. Within a few years, he owned six silver mines, coal mines, and several silver smelters. Hauser also acquired a large real estate portfolio in support of his mining and ranching interests.

However, the cost of transporting heavy equipment and ore cut into the profits of Hauser's mines. To solve the problem of shipping, Hauser invested heavily in railroad branch lines to link his mines to markets. He partnered with the Northern Pacific Railway to build the Helena, Boulder Valley, & Butte Railroad in 1887, as well as the Helena & Jefferson County, the Drummond & Philipsburg, the Helena & Red Mountain, the Helena Northern, and the Missoula & Bitter Root Valley spur lines. Hauser's partnership with the Northern Pacific was based on gentleman's agreements, without formal contracts. For each line that Hauser built, the Northern Pacific underwrote part of the construction costs. Hauser managed the construction of the lines and leased them to the Northern Pacific. The relationship between the two parties was a difficult one. Hauser was perpetually late with his loan payments, angering officials of the cash-strapped Northern Pacific. Nevertheless, both parties benefited from the arrangement. Hauser got his railroads, and in return, he often did favors for the Northern Pacific—for example, he once convinced copper kings William Andrews Clark and Marcus Daly to accept a rate increase for ore shipments.

Hauser's railroads invigorated Montana's mining industry. Not only could ores be shipped economically to smelters and to markets, but the shipment of heavy equipment allowed bigger, more efficient mills and smelters to be built locally. But while Hauser relentlessly promoted Montana's interests, he watched out for his own interests first and foremost. In 1883, Hauser bought the Alta mine through his Helena Mining and Reduction Company. The mine was failing due to the high cost of transportation of ore, equipment, and even food. Hauser organized the Alta-Montana Company with himself as director and built a branch line to connect the district to Helena. The mine turned out to be one of the richest silver mines in the territory.

Besides his mining interests, Hauser invested in cattle and partnered with Granville Stuart and A. J. Davis in the DHS Ranch. In 1870, Hauser participated as a member of the Washburn–Langford–Doane Expedition. He was also active in efforts to preserve the Yellowstone area and his lobbying efforts helped see the creation of the Yellowstone National Park. Politically he was aligned with the Democratic Party and served as a delegate to the 1884 Democratic National Convention. Despite being a Democrat, Hauser's business influence was large within the territory that he even influenced the selection of Republican appointees.

== Governorship ==
Hauser became the first territorial resident to be appointed Governor of Montana Territory after President Grover Cleveland appointed him to the position on July 3, 1885. He took office on July 14 of the same year. During his term of office, his many business interests consumed much of his time and many of his duties as governor were delegated to his personal secretary. In fact, Hauser's critics alleged he only took public office in order to further his business interests.

A Democrat, Hauser allied himself with key Republicans to further the economic development of the territory. Hauser maintained ties to other western Democrats interested in economic development, particularly Missouri Senator George Graham Vest. It was Vest, along with Montana's territorial delegate James K. Toole, who negotiated Hauser's appointment as governor.

As governor, Hauser was an advocate of free silver and supported relocating the territory's indigenous population to the Indian Territory in order to free land for settlers. To appease cattle interests within the territory he appointed a territorial veterinary surgeon while, in an effort to constrain territorial spending, vetoed the establishment of a territorial insane asylum.

In order to free himself to concentrate on his business activities, Hauser submitted his resignation in December 1886. His last day in office came on February 7, 1887.

== Banking ==
In 1866, Hauser founded the First National Bank of Helena. (Note: Hauser later opened banks in Fort Benton, Butte, and Missoula. See The National Cyclopaedia of American Biography, p. 80-81.) The bank received its charter April 5, 1866, with capital from St. Louis investors and with Hauser as president. Troubles began almost immediately.

=== Risky loans ===
Under the National Bank Act, the Office of the Comptroller of the Currency chartered and regulated national banks. National banks, including Hauser's First National Bank of Helena, could issue national bank notes backed by the purchase of federal government bonds. These national bank notes constituted the national currency. Among other things, the law required national banks to maintain a reserve of fifteen percent of all bank notes and deposits. In addition, loans to a single borrower were limited to ten percent of capital and surplus. National banks had to report to the comptroller, and the comptroller hired bank examiners to ensure that banks followed the law, loaned wisely, and otherwise stayed healthy.

Under Hauser's leadership, the First National Bank of Helena ignored many of these regulations from the start. Hauser blamed the problems on the isolation of the area. Because no railroad connected Helena to the outside world, transportation was slow or nonexistent. Telegraph lines could be down, and even Indian hostilities could hamper communication. Under these conditions, banks tolerated overdrafts, essentially considering them short-term, interest-free loans. Ranchers and miners working outside of Helena often wrote drafts against their accounts, even if they had no balance or a negative balance. Later, after selling their herds or ore, they would come to town and settle their accounts. Hauser's bank also made advances against the silver profits of mines, without requiring collateral or an endorser, based only on an assay report. When a mine proved profitable, such loans resulted in profit for the bank. But often, the veins of silver would "pinch out," leaving the bank with nothing but valueless paper. The bank also practiced the nineteenth-century custom of accepting single-name paper. A single-name paper was a promissory note with only one signature rather than the usual co-signer. Essentially, it was an unsecured loan based only on a borrower's good reputation.

The first bank examiner to look into the affairs of the First National Bank of Helena, H. H. Wernse, reported in 1870 that Hauser was away from the bank on travels half the time and that, although he was respected locally, he was "more popular than competent." In 1872, the job of bank examiner was taken over by Hauser's personal friend Nathaniel Langford. Langford's reports painted Hauser in a good light, calling him a "rustling active businessman." But by 1879, even Langford noted that the bank had dangerous levels of risky single-name paper loans. He begged Hauser to reform the bank's practices. In 1886, Langford moved on from his job as bank examiner. The two examiners who succeeded him both reported long lists of problems: lax management, poor record-keeping, excessive loans, loans to officers and directors, unsecured paper, overdrafts, and disregard for banking law all threatened the bank's health.

Yet in his reports to the comptroller, which were published in the local newspaper, Hauser painted an optimistic picture. In 1888, he reported that the bank provided 3.1 million dollars in loans; listed "Other Stocks and Bonds" at $218,800; and listed "Undivided Profits" at $373,795. Bank examiner H. H. Taylor reported a more pessimistic view: $819,144—a full 25 percent—of the bank's loans were overdue paper. He figured that much of the debt would never be repaid. He also noted that over 2 million dollars of the loans were single-name paper, including $791,000 in loans to the bank's officers and directors, including Hauser. He finished his report by pointing out that these bad debts would swallow up the bank's profits. By 1890, another examiner noted that "one serious run on this bank would end it," and by 1891, the comptroller threatened to revoke the bank's charter. But Hauser continued to brush off the bad reports, saying that the loans were mere technical violations of banking statute.

=== Panic of 1893 ===
In 1893, the market for silver collapsed, the price of silver tumbled, and the national economy went into recession. Across the Rocky Mountain region, silver mines and smelters closed (including Hauser's mines and smelters). By the end of the year, unemployment in Montana reached 20,000. The panic triggered runs on banks, especially those, like Hauser's First National Bank of Helena, with ties to silver. Hauser was financially ruined. On July 26, a run on the First National Bank of Helena forced it to close its doors. The bank was suspended on July 27 and entered receivership. In 1894 it merged with Helena National Bank and reopened, with Hauser keeping his office as president.

=== Grand jury ===
First National Bank of Helena reopened for business on January 22, 1894. As president, Hauser continued his public optimism about the bank's success while also continuing his lax management style and his disregard for banking law. In June 1896, a bank examiner reported, "The bank is in very weak condition. It is running so low on cash that it would take but a slight attack to break it." The examiner's prediction came true. The bank closed its doors permanently that August. On September 4, the bank was suspended. A federal grand jury convened in November and published their findings on December 16. They indicted the bank's officers, including Hauser. Their long report charged, "that the president and directors of the bank have been criminally negligent in the conduct of the administration of their trust and cannot be too highly censured for the reckless and inexcusable manner in which they allowed the affairs of the bank to be mismanaged." The grand jury reported misconduct that included kickbacks to the state treasurer and a shady investment program in which poor laborers deposited their small savings with a promise of six percent interest—which was never paid.

In response to the grand jury's report, comptroller of the currency James H. Eckels appointed an independent examiner, H. A. Forman, to look into the allegations. Forman reported a long list of misconduct by Hauser and the bank's other officials. In the ledgers, he found fake entries designed to make the bank appear to have extra cash. He found bogus account headings that the officers used to hide some of the bank's bad debt. He found a suspicious account for First National Bank of Butte (also operated by Hauser) that he guessed must have been used to juggle funds and deceive the office of the comptroller of currency. In addition, Hauser had used the bank to further his own private interest and political alliances. Forman noted that Hauser had loaned $170,000 to a newspaper publisher in Helena, but the managers of the newspaper knew nothing about it. In fact, Hauser had diverted the money to his own projects, and the newspaper never knew anything about its supposed loan. Besides this, Forman discovered that Hauser had made vast loans to the members of his family and then funneled the money back into his own pockets. Hauser had also made large loans to himself and then charged them off to profit and loss. Finally, Hauser's relatives who worked at the bank had helped him by substituting less valuable assets for solid securities, effectively looting the bank. In total, Forman estimated that Hauser and his friends had taken more than $2 million.

In a grand jury hearing in May 1897, the prosecution mishandled their presentation, and Hauser's lawyers quashed the indictments. In other proceedings, grand juries failed to return indictments. Several times, jury members changed their votes and dismissed charges. The bank's receiver, J. Sam Brown, claimed that jury members had been bribed. Newspapers reported that politics had influenced the entire affair. In the end, no one was punished for the fraud at First National Bank of Helena.

== Hydroelectric dams ==
Having lost his first fortune with the closure of his bank and silver mines, Hauser embarked on a new project, a series of hydroelectric developments on the Missouri River. By tapping the vast energy potential of the Missouri River, Hauser believed, Montana's mining operations could be expanded and fortunes could be made. He named his new company the Helena Water and Electric Company. In 1896, Hauser convinced Abram Hewitt to invest the money to build the first Canyon Ferry Dam. Hauser also convinced copper king William Clark to invest. Hauser wrote that he manipulated Clark with flattery: "He loves the flattery and admiration of his fellow man. With most monied men cupidity absorbs all other passions or traits." Construction of Canyon Ferry Dam began in 1896. The dam was completed in 1898 and powered an ore concentrator at Corbin, Montana, in which Hauser had invested; a smelter at East Helena; and the city of Helena.

In 1900, Hauser formed the Missouri River Power Company and convinced Henry Huttleston Rogers to invest. Rogers was a leader of Standard Oil, which held controlling interest in the Amalgamated Copper Company in Butte, Montana. With Rogers's financial backing, Hauser built a 100,000-volt transmission line to Butte. Completed in 1901, the line ran for sixty miles and crossed the Continental Divide. In May 1905, Hauser convinced Rogers to loan him nine hundred thousand dollars to build another dam. The two men entered an agreement in which Amalgamated would buy electrical power from the Missouri River Power Company. Rogers insisted on a nonperformance clause, which made Hauser liable if his dams could not provide enough electricity. Under the terms of their deal, Amalgamated bought 75 percent of the electricity generated by Hauser's dams and owned 15 percent of the Missouri River Power Company's stock. Hauser also made Rogers the president of his power company.

In 1906, Hauser announced his plans to build his new steel dam on the Missouri River south of Helena. Completed in February 1907, Hauser Dam was one of only three steel dams in the world. It operated for just over a year before it burst on April 14, 1908, sending a flood of water downriver. Hauser was away on business in New York when the dam broke. When he heard the news, he sent word that he would rebuild Hauser Dam and build another dam at Wolf Creek. His optimistic telegram read, "The dam's entire cost represents only about 10 per cent of the entire amount of money invested by the two companies, hence there is no doubt but that the dam will be rebuilt. The third dam will also be built, as we have the money and the government has approved the plans; besides our company's customers have saved every year more than the cost of the dam." But more than 150 landowners below the dam claimed damages, and Hauser's company was forced to pay $148,522. Worse, Canyon Ferry Dam could not generate enough power to satisfy Hauser's contracts with Amalgamated, and Hauser was liable.

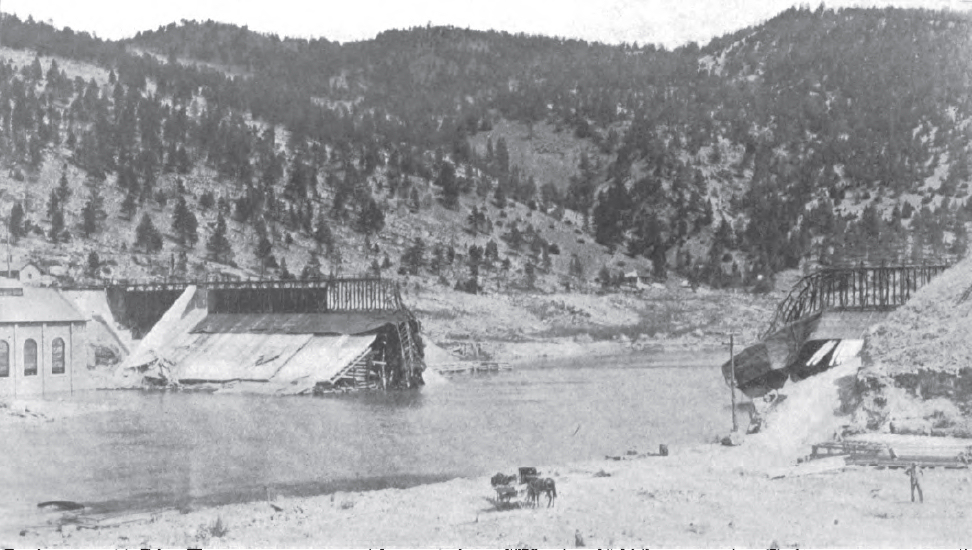
Hauser Dam after it collapsed in 1908

Hauser rebuilt the dam, and it became operational in the spring of 1911. But in the process, Hauser incurred debts he could not repay. Rogers had died in 1909, leaving Hauser without his patron. In the meantime, Amalgamated built its own dam, Rainbow Dam, at the Great Falls of the Missouri River. The dam began producing power in 1910. In September 1910, just before Hauser Dam was rebuilt, Amalgamated formally terminated its contracts with Hauser's power company. Meanwhile, Amalgamated's president John D. Ryan quietly gained control of Amalgamated's interests in the Missouri River dams. (Note: Ryan's machinations laid the groundwork for the Montana Power Company, which incorporated on November 11, 1912. Within the year, Ryan's power company controlled most of they hydroelectric dams in Montana. See Parrett, p. 43.) Hauser tried to save himself from financial ruin by asking William Clark for financial backing. But Clark had allied himself with Amalgamated, and he refused to loan Hauser more money. Hauser's hydroelectric enterprise foundered, creditors assumed control, the dams ended up in control of Ryan's Montana Power Company, and Hauser lost his second fortune.

== Personal life, death and legacy ==
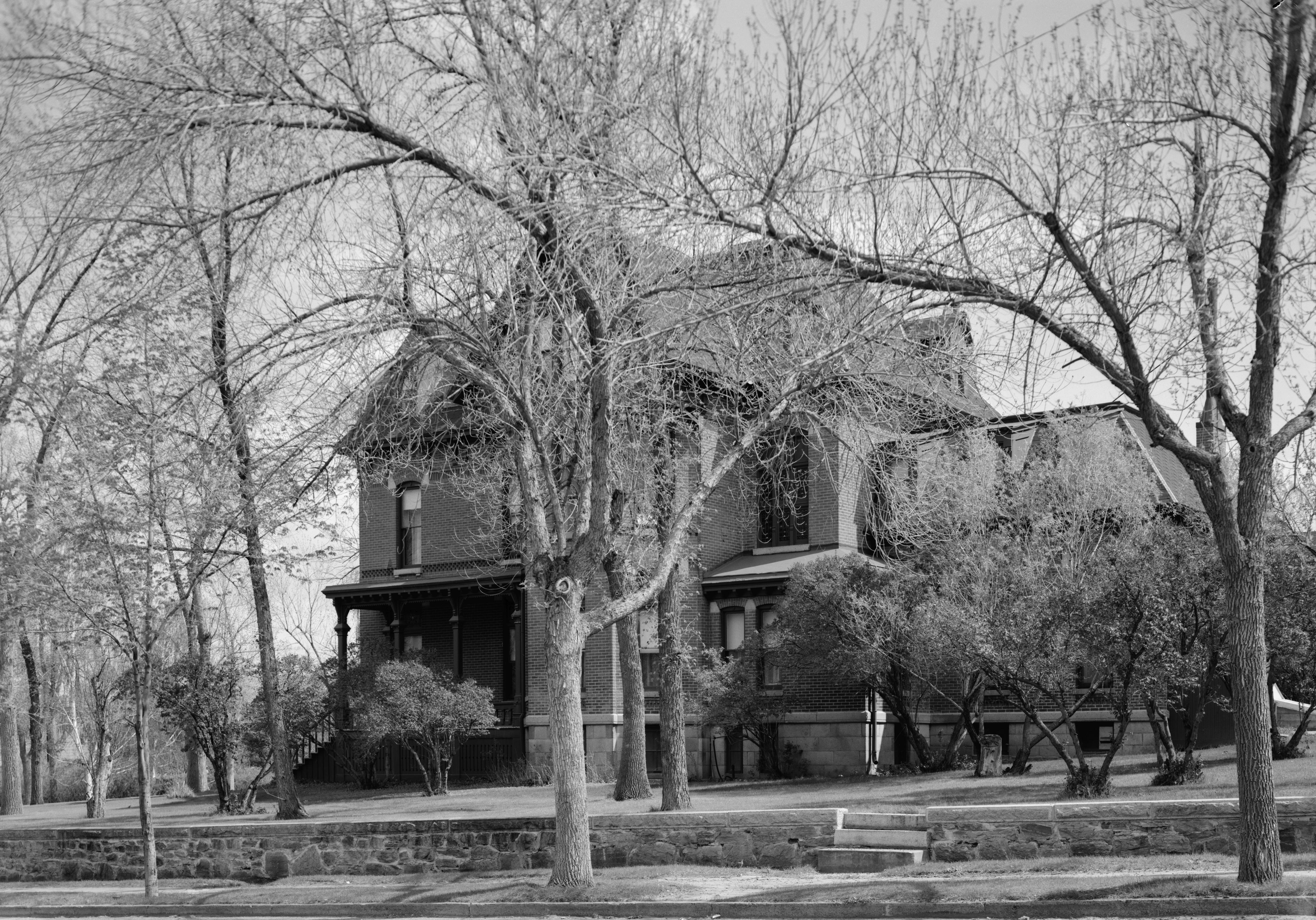
The Hauser Mansion

Hauser built the Hauser Mansion in Helena; it is now listed on the National Register of Historic Places.

Hauser died in Helena, Montana on November 10, 1914, and was buried in the Forestvale Cemetery.

Hauser Dam, northeast of Helena, Montana is named after Hauser.
