= Gold Creek (Montana) =

Creek in Montana, United States of America

Gold Creek is a creek in southwestern Montana, United States, on Interstate 90 northwest of Garrison, between Butte and Missoula. It flows through parts of Granite County and Powell County and empties into the Clark Fork (river) at the [town] of Goldcreek (46°35′12″N 112°55′43″W), northwest of the town of Garrison.

In 1852, a trapper named Francois Finlay, who was also known as Benetsee, found the first recorded gold in what is now Montana in what he named Benetsee Creek. However, not enough gold was found to make mining commercially viable.

In 1858, prospectors James and Granville Stuart and Reese Anderson discovered gold in the creek. The three men didn't have sufficient tools to begin excavating, and were unable to return with the proper equipment until 1862. The creek was renamed "Gold Creek" because of the gold found there. The Stuart brothers and their prospecting party helped open up Western Montana to settlers, all due to their initial find at Gold Creek.

Gold Creek is near where the last spike of the Northern Pacific Railway was driven on September 8, 1883.
