= 1988 United States gubernatorial elections =

- November 8, 1988

14 governorships 12 states; 2 territories
	Majority party	Minority party
Party	Democratic	Republican
Seats before	27 (Note: Rose Mofford (D) succeeded Arizona Governor Evan Mecham (R) following his impeachment conviction.)	23
Seats after	28	22
Seat change	▲1	▼1
Seats up	4	8
Seats won	5	7
- Democratic gain Democratic hold Republican gain Republican hold Scheduled Recall cancelled

United States gubernatorial elections were held on November 8, 1988, in 12 states and two territories. Going into the elections, eight seats were held by Republicans, and four by Democrats. After the elections, the Democrats had a net gain of one seat. The elections coincided with the United States House elections, United States Senate elections and presidential election. As of 2026, this is the last time that a Republican was elected as a Governor of Delaware, and the last time a Democrat was elected as a Governor of North Dakota.

== Election results ==
State	Incumbent	Party	First elected	Result	Candidates
Arizona (recall)	Evan Mecham	Republican	1986	Already scheduled recall election cancelled after Mecham's impeachment Secretary of State Rose Mofford (D) succeeded him.	
Delaware	Mike Castle	Republican	1984	Incumbent re-elected.	✓ Mike Castle (Republican) 70.7%; Jacob Kreshtool (Democratic) 29.3%
Indiana	Robert D. Orr	Republican	1980	Incumbent term-limited. New governor elected. Democratic gain.	✓ Evan Bayh (Democratic) 53.2%; John Mutz (Republican) 46.8%
Missouri	John Ashcroft	Republican	1984	Incumbent re-elected.	✓ John Ashcroft (Republican) 64.2%; Betty Cooper Hearnes (Democratic) 34.8%; Mike Roberts (Libertarian) 1.0%
Montana	Ted Schwinden	Democratic	1980	Incumbent term-limited. New governor elected. Republican gain.	✓ Stan Stephens (Republican) 51.9%; Thomas Lee Judge (Democratic) 46.1%
New Hampshire	John H. Sununu	Republican	1982	Incumbent retired. New governor elected. Republican hold.	✓ Judd Gregg (Republican) 60.4%; Paul McEachern (Democratic) 39.0%
North Carolina	James G. Martin	Republican	1984	Incumbent re-elected.	✓ James G. Martin (Republican) 56.1%; Robert B. Jordan (Democratic) 43.9%
North Dakota	George A. Sinner	Democratic-NPL	1984	Incumbent re-elected.	✓ George A. Sinner (Democratic-NPL) 59.9%; Leon L. Mallberg (Republican) 40.1%
Rhode Island	Edward D. DiPrete	Republican	1984	Incumbent re-elected.	✓ Edward D. DiPrete (Republican) 50.8%; Bruce Sundlun (Democratic) 49.2%
Utah	Norman H. Bangerter	Republican	1984	Incumbent re-elected.	✓ Norman H. Bangerter (Republican) 40.1%; Ted Wilson (Democratic) 38.4%; Merrill Cook (Independent) 21.1%; Kitty K. Burton (Libertarian) 0.3%; Arly H. Pedersen (Ind. American) 0.2%
Vermont	Madeleine Kunin	Democratic	1982	Incumbent re-elected.	✓ Madeleine Kunin (Democratic) 55.3%; Michael Bernhardt (Republican) 43.3%; Richard Gottlieb (Liberty Union) 1.2%
Washington	Booth Gardner	Democratic	1984	Incumbent re-elected.	✓ Booth Gardner (Democratic) 62.2%; Robert Williams (Republican) 37.8%
West Virginia	Arch A. Moore Jr.	Republican	1968; 1976 (term-limited); 1984	Incumbent lost re-election. New governor elected. Democratic gain.	✓ Gaston Caperton (Democratic) 58.9%; Arch A. Moore Jr. (Republican) 41.1%

=== Territories ===
Territory	Incumbent	Party	First elected	Result	Candidates
Puerto Rico	Rafael Hernández Colón	Popular Democratic	1984	Incumbent re-elected.	✓ Rafael Hernández Colón (PPD) 48.67%; Baltasar Corrada del Río (PNP) 45.79%; Rubén Berríos (PIP) 5.54%

== Close states ==
States where the margin of victory was under 5%:

1. Rhode Island, 1.6%
2. Utah, 1.7%
3. Puerto Rico, 2.9%

States where the margin of victory was under 10%:

1. Indiana, 6.4%
2. Montana, 5.8%

== Delaware ==
1988 Delaware gubernatorial election
- November 8, 1988
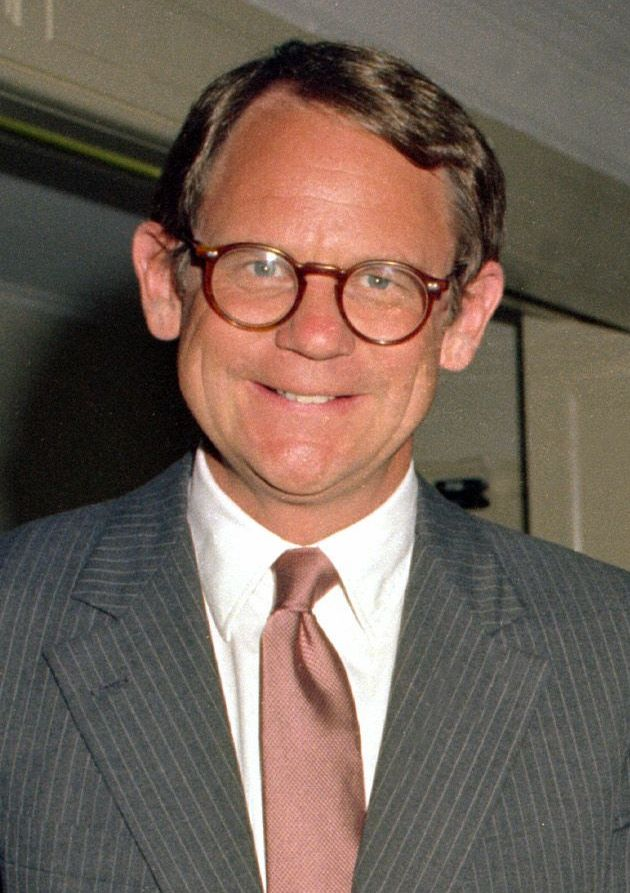

Nominee	Mike Castle	Jacob Kreshtool
Party	Republican	Democratic
Running mate	Dale E. Wolf	Gary E. Hindes
Popular vote	169,733	70,236
Percentage	70.7%	29.3%
- Castle: 50–60% 60–70% 70–80% 80–90% Kreshtool: 60–70%
Governor before election
Mike Castle
Republican
Elected Governor
Mike Castle
Republican

The 1988 Delaware gubernatorial election took place on November 8, 1988. Incumbent Republican governor Mike Castle won re-election to a second term, defeating Democratic nominee labor lawyer Jacob Kreshtool in a landslide.

== Indiana ==
1988 Indiana gubernatorial election
- November 8, 1988
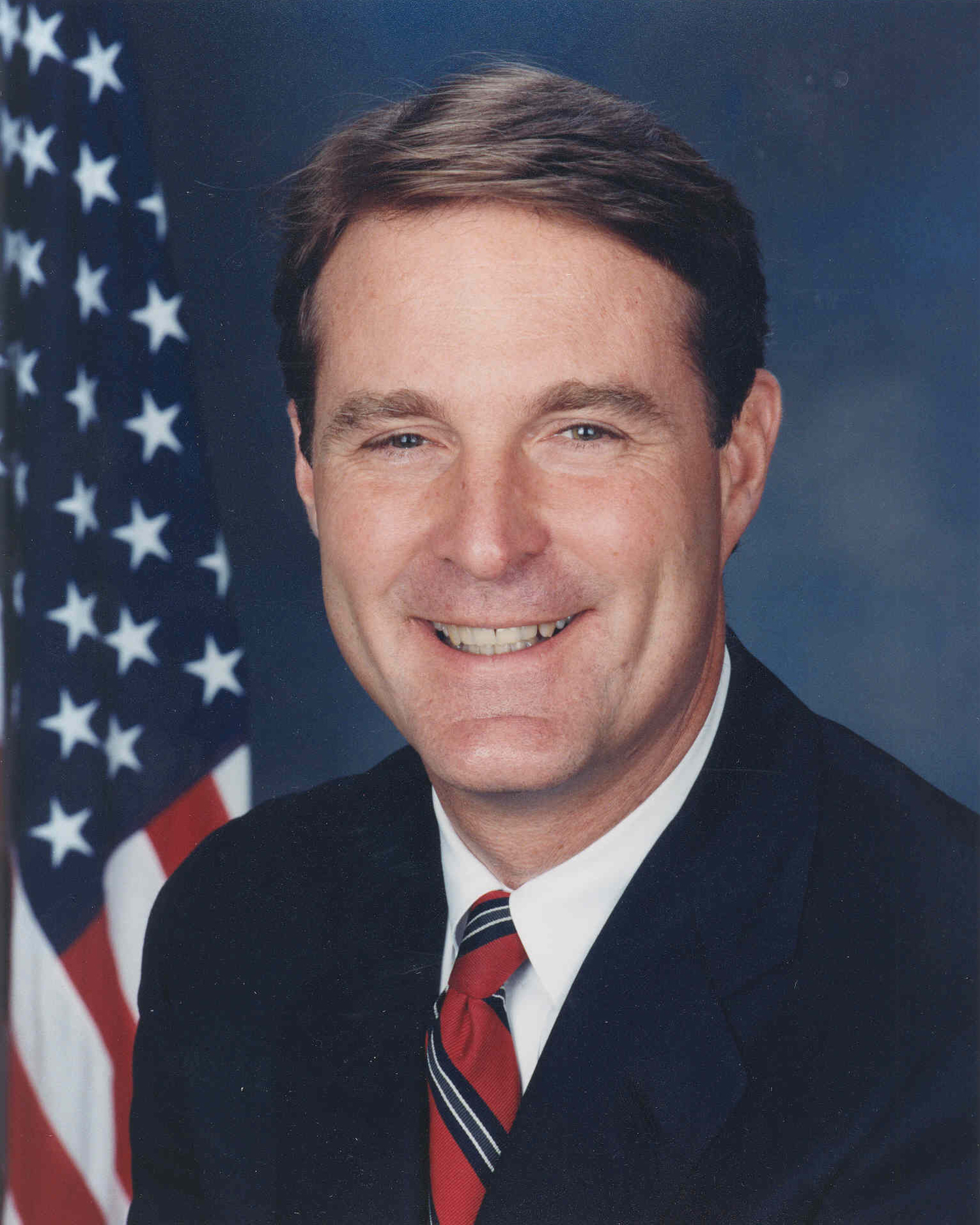

Nominee	Evan Bayh	John Mutz
Party	Democratic	Republican
Running mate	Frank O'Bannon	Stephen Goldsmith
Popular vote	1,138,574	1,000,207
Percentage	53.2%	46.8%
- County results Bayh: 50–60% 60–70% 70–80% Mutz: 50–60% 60–70% 70–80%
Governor before election
Robert D. Orr
Republican
Elected Governor
Evan Bayh
Democratic

The 1988 Indiana gubernatorial election was held on November 8, 1988, in all 92 counties in the state of Indiana. Incumbent Governor Robert D. Orr, a Republican, was ineligible to run for a third consecutive term due to term limits established by the Indiana Constitution. In the general election, the Republican nominee, Lieutenant Governor John Mutz, was defeated by Democrat Indiana Secretary of State Evan Bayh by a margin of six percentage points. Bayh was the first Democrat to be elected Governor of Indiana since Roger D. Branigin's victory during the 1964 Democratic landslides twenty-four years previously.

== Missouri ==
1988 Missouri gubernatorial election
- November 8, 1988
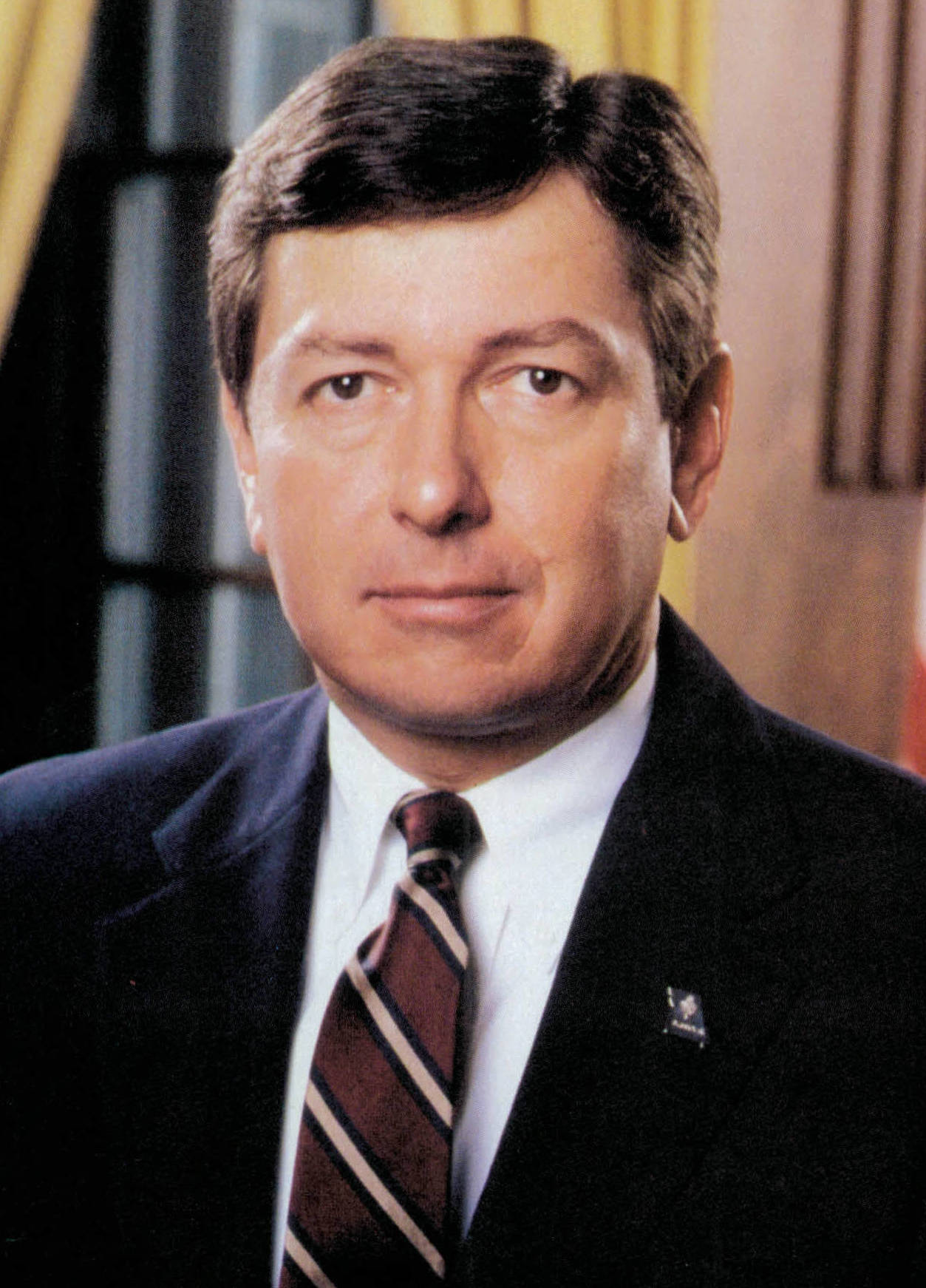

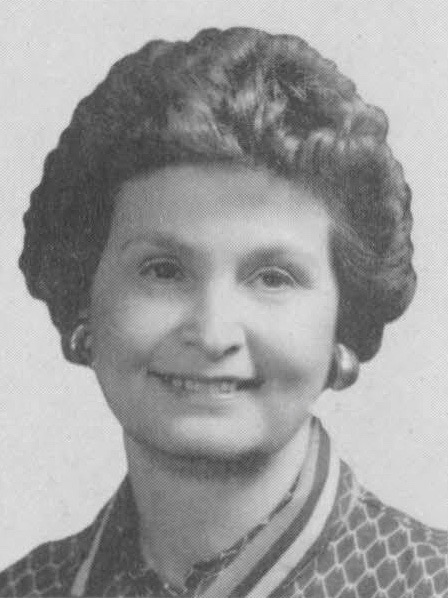
Nominee	John Ashcroft	Betty Hearnes
Party	Republican	Democratic
Popular vote	1,339,531	724,919
Percentage	64.2%	34.8%
- County results Ashcroft: 50–60% 60–70% 70–80% Hearnes: 50–60% 60–70%
Governor before election
John Ashcroft
Republican
Elected Governor
John Ashcroft
Republican

The 1988 Missouri gubernatorial election was held on November 8, 1988, and resulted in a victory for the Republican nominee, incumbent Governor John Ashcroft, over the Democratic candidate, State Representative Betty Cooper Hearnes, and Libertarian Mike Roberts.

== Montana ==
1988 Montana gubernatorial election
- November 8, 1988
- Turnout: 75.00%

Nominee	Stan Stephens	Thomas Lee Judge
Party	Republican	Democratic
Running mate	Allen Kolstad	Barbara B. Skelton
Popular vote	190,604	169,313
Percentage	51.93%	46.13%
- County results Stephens: 40–50% 50–60% 60–70% 70–80% Judge: 40–50% 50–60% 60–70% 70–80%
Governor before election
Ted Schwinden
Democratic
Elected Governor
Stan Stephens
Republican

The 1988 Montana gubernatorial election took place on November 8, 1988. Incumbent Governor of Montana Ted Schwinden, who was first elected in 1980 and was re-elected in 1984, declined to seek re-election to a third term, creating an open seat. Stan Stephens, the former president of the Montana Senate, won a close Republican primary, and advanced to the general election, where he was opposed by Thomas Lee Judge, Schwinden's predecessor as governor and the Democratic nominee. Though the general election was hotly contested, Stephens ultimately defeated Judge, becoming the first Republican to win a gubernatorial election in Montana since 1964.

== New Hampshire ==
1988 New Hampshire gubernatorial election
- November 6, 1988

Nominee	Judd Gregg	Paul McEachern
Party	Republican	Democratic
Popular vote	267,064	172,543
Percentage	60.45%	39.05%
- Gregg: 40–50% 50–60% 60–70% 70–80% 80–90% >90% McEachern: 50–60% 60–70%
Governor before election
John Sununu
Republican
Elected Governor
Judd Gregg
Republican

The 1988 New Hampshire gubernatorial election took place on November 6, 1988. Incumbent Governor John Sununu did not run for re-election, and was succeeded by U.S. Representative Judd Gregg.

== North Carolina ==
1988 North Carolina gubernatorial election
- November 8, 1988
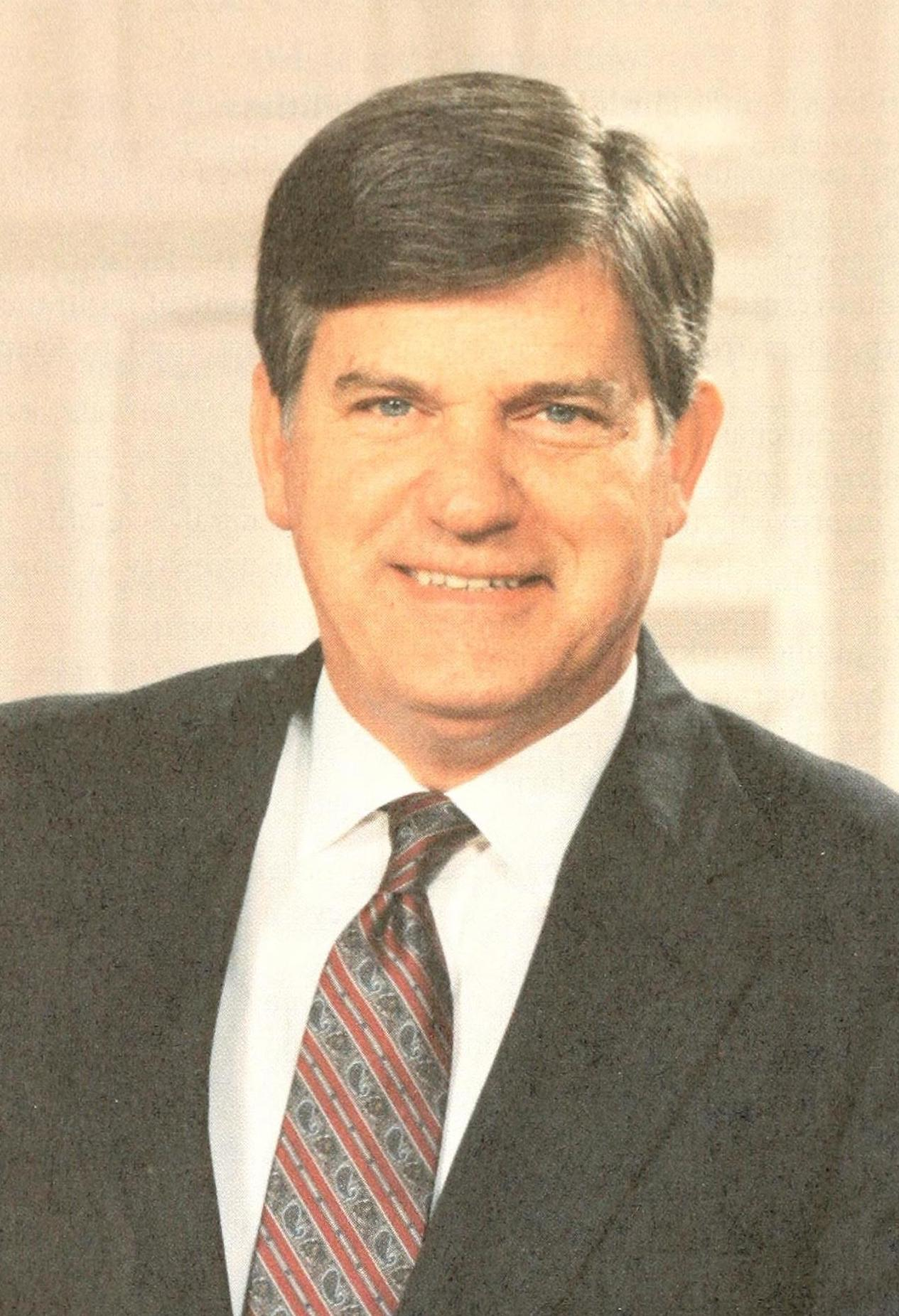

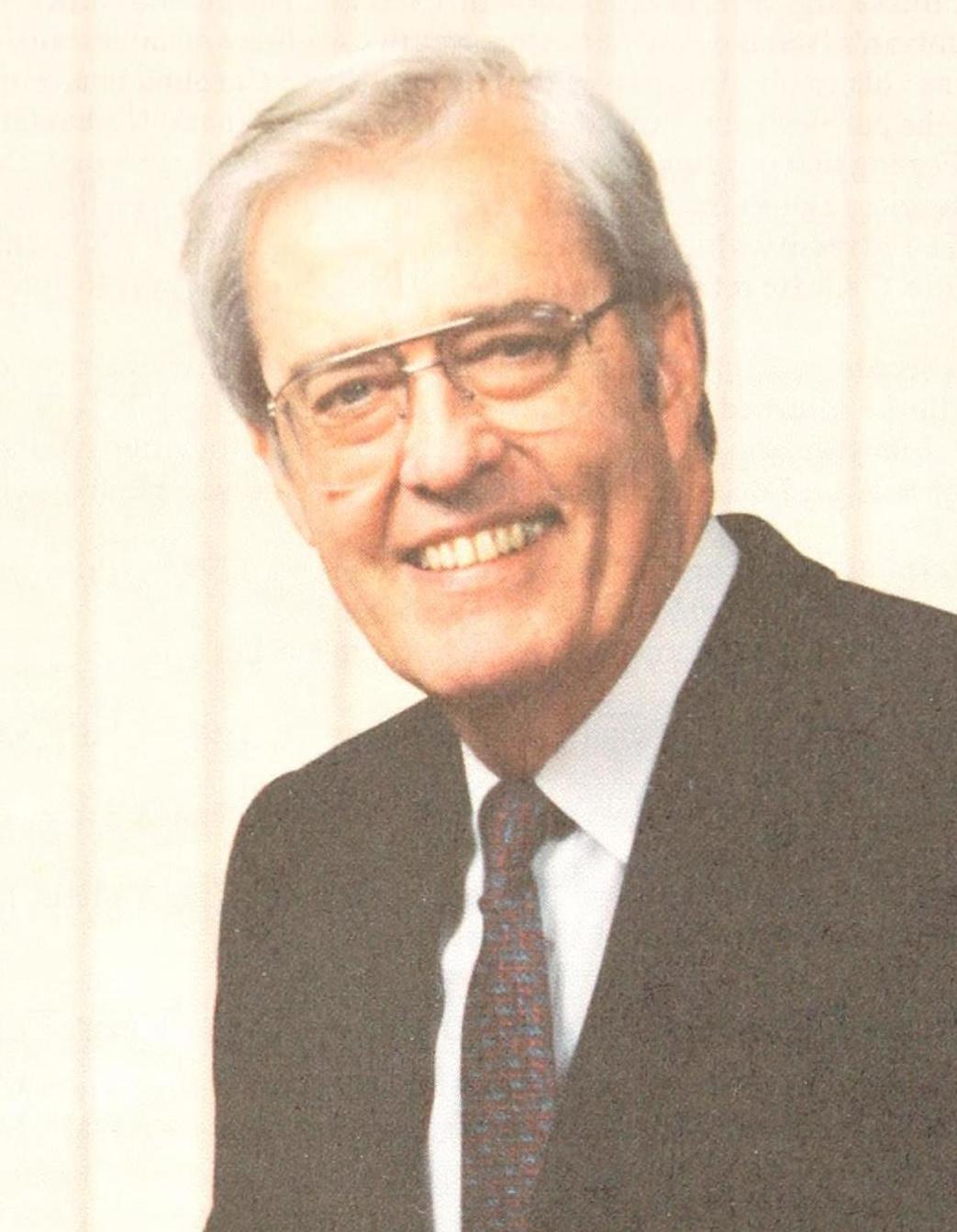
Nominee	James G. Martin	Robert B. Jordan
Party	Republican	Democratic
Popular vote	1,222,258	997,408
Percentage	55.06%	44.94%
- County results Martin: 50–60% 60–70% 70–80% Jordan: 50–60% 60–70% 70–80%
Governor before election
James Martin
Republican
Elected Governor
James Martin
Republican

The 1988 North Carolina gubernatorial election was held on November 8, 1988. Popular Incumbent Governor James G. Martin ran and was re-elected by a comfortable margin over Democratic Challenger former Lieutenant Governor Robert B. Jordan III.

== North Dakota ==
1988 North Dakota gubernatorial election
- November 8, 1988
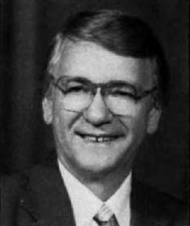

Nominee	George A. Sinner	Leon Mallberg
Party	Democratic–NPL	Republican
Running mate	Lloyd Omdahl	Donna Nalewaja
Popular vote	179,094	119,986
Percentage	59.9%	40.1%
- County results Sinner: 50–60% 60–70% 70–80% Mallberg: 50–60%
Governor before election
George A. Sinner
Democratic–NPL
Elected Governor
George A. Sinner
Democratic–NPL

The 1988 North Dakota gubernatorial election took place on November 8, 1988 to elect the governor of North Dakota. Incumbent Democratic governor George A. Sinner was reelected to a second term with 58% of the vote, defeating Republican nominee Leon Mallberg.

== Rhode Island ==
1988 Rhode Island gubernatorial election
- November 8, 1988
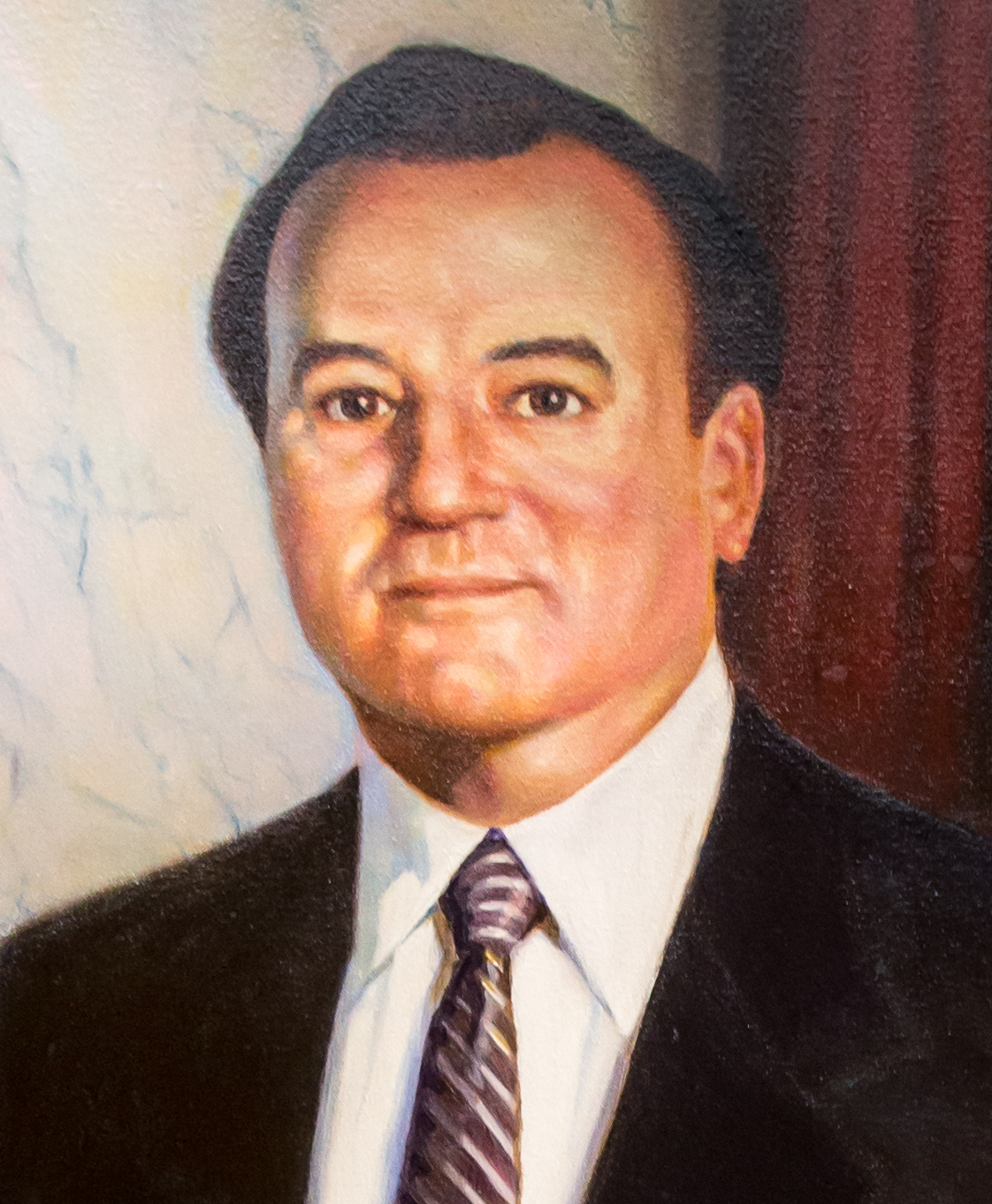

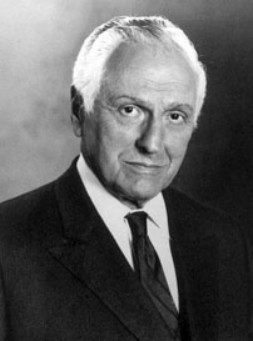
Nominee	Edward D. DiPrete	Bruce Sundlun
Party	Republican	Democratic
Popular vote	203,550	196,925
Percentage	50.8%	49.2%
- DiPrete: 50–60% 60–70% Sundlun: 50–60% 60–70%
Governor before election
Edward D. DiPrete
Republican
Elected Governor
Edward D. DiPrete
Republican

The 1988 Rhode Island gubernatorial election was held on November 8, 1988. Incumbent Republican Edward D. DiPrete defeated Democratic nominee Bruce Sundlun with 50.83% of the vote.

== Utah ==
1988 Utah gubernatorial election
- November 8, 1988
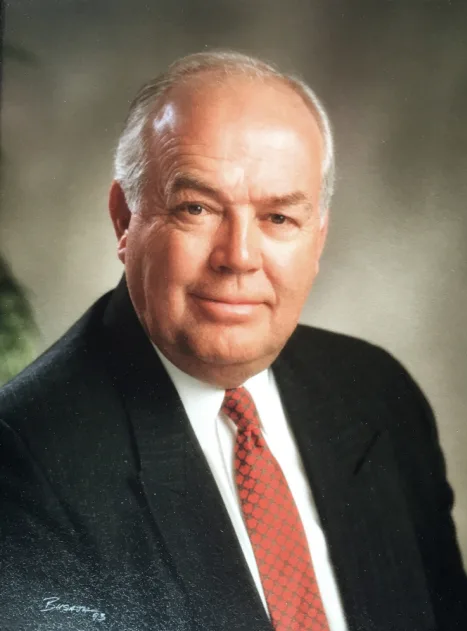

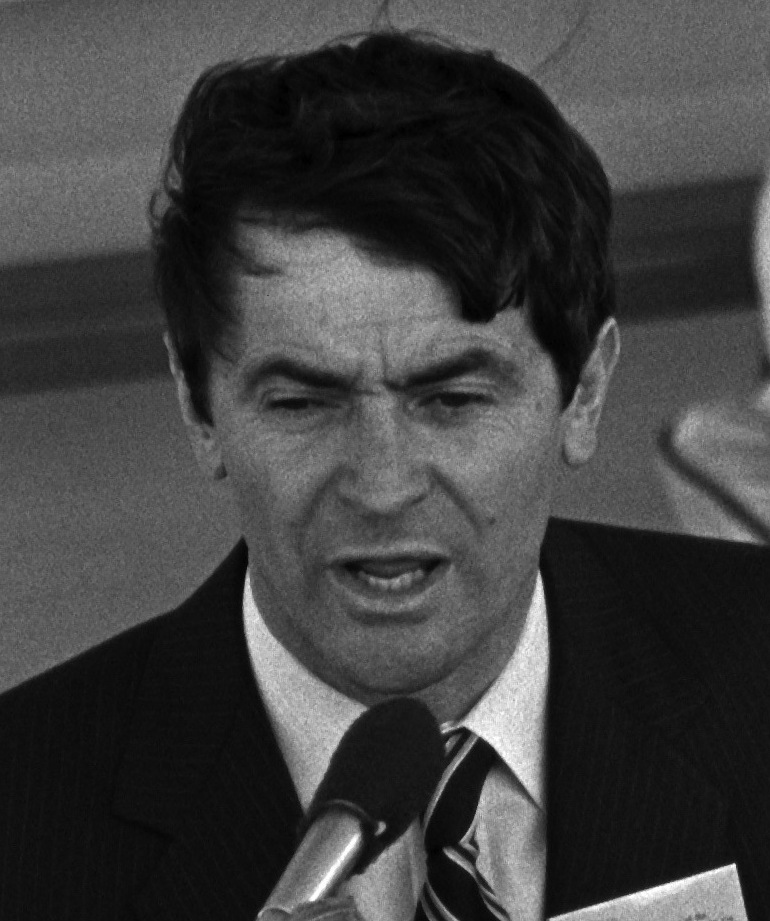

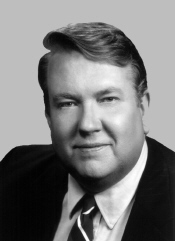
Nominee	Norman H. Bangerter	Ted Wilson	Merrill Cook
Party	Republican	Democratic	Independent
Popular vote	260,462	249,321	136,651
Percentage	40.13%	38.41%	21.05%
- County results Bangerter: 30–40% 40–50% 50–60% 60–70% 70–80% Wilson: 30–40% 40–50% 50–60% 60–70% 70–80%
Governor before election
Norman H. Bangerter
Republican
Elected Governor
Norman H. Bangerter
Republican

The 1988 Utah gubernatorial election was held on November 8, 1988. Republican nominee and incumbent governor Norman H. Bangerter defeated Democratic nominee Ted Wilson and independent Merrill Cook with 40.13% of the vote.

== Vermont ==
1988 Vermont gubernatorial election
- November 8, 1988
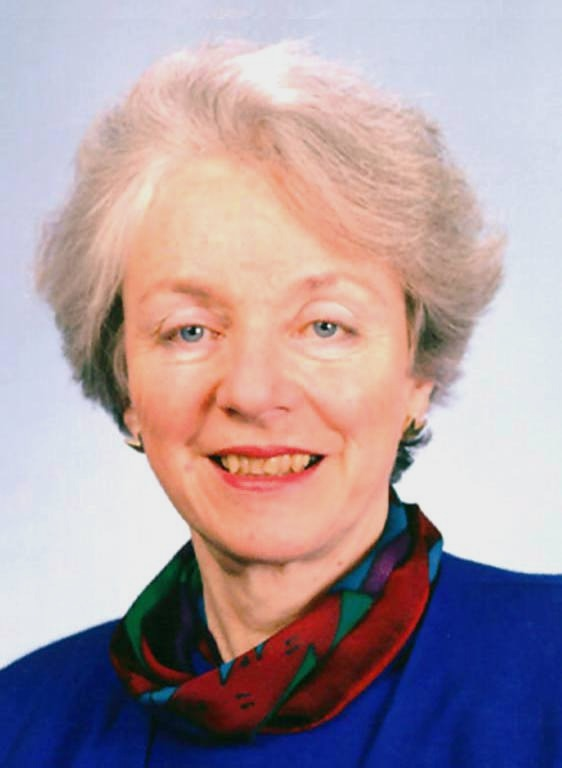

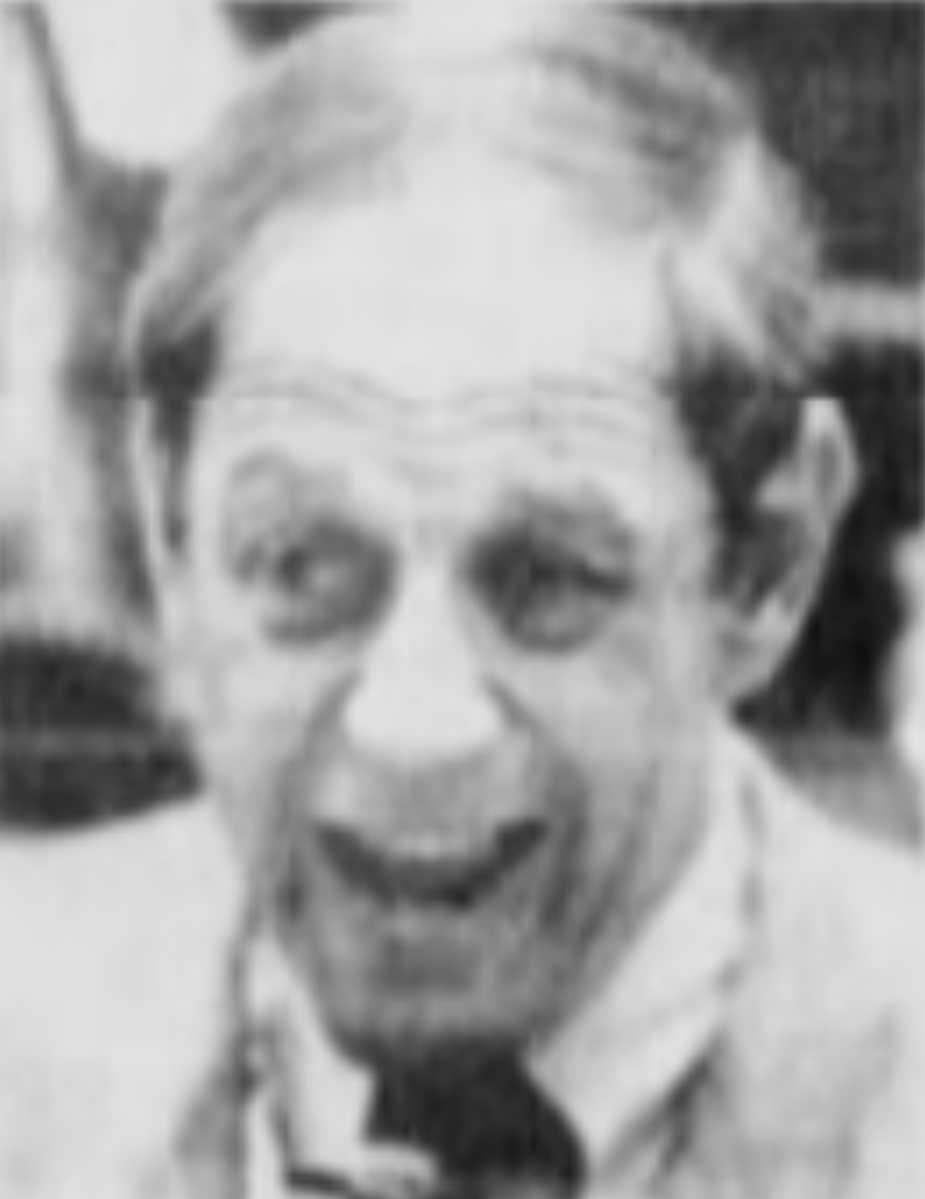
Nominee	Madeleine Kunin	Michael Bernhardt
Party	Democratic	Republican
Popular vote	134,558	105,319
Percentage	55.3%	43.3%
- Kunin: 40-50% 50-60% 60-70% 70-80% Bernhardt: 40-50% 50-60% 60-70% 70-80% 80-90%
Governor before election
Madeleine Kunin
Democratic
Elected Governor
Madeleine Kunin
Democratic

The 1988 Vermont gubernatorial election took place on November 8, 1988. Incumbent Democrat Madeleine Kunin ran successfully for re-election to a third term as Governor of Vermont, defeating Republican candidate Michael Bernhardt.

== Washington ==
1988 Washington gubernatorial election
- November 8, 1988
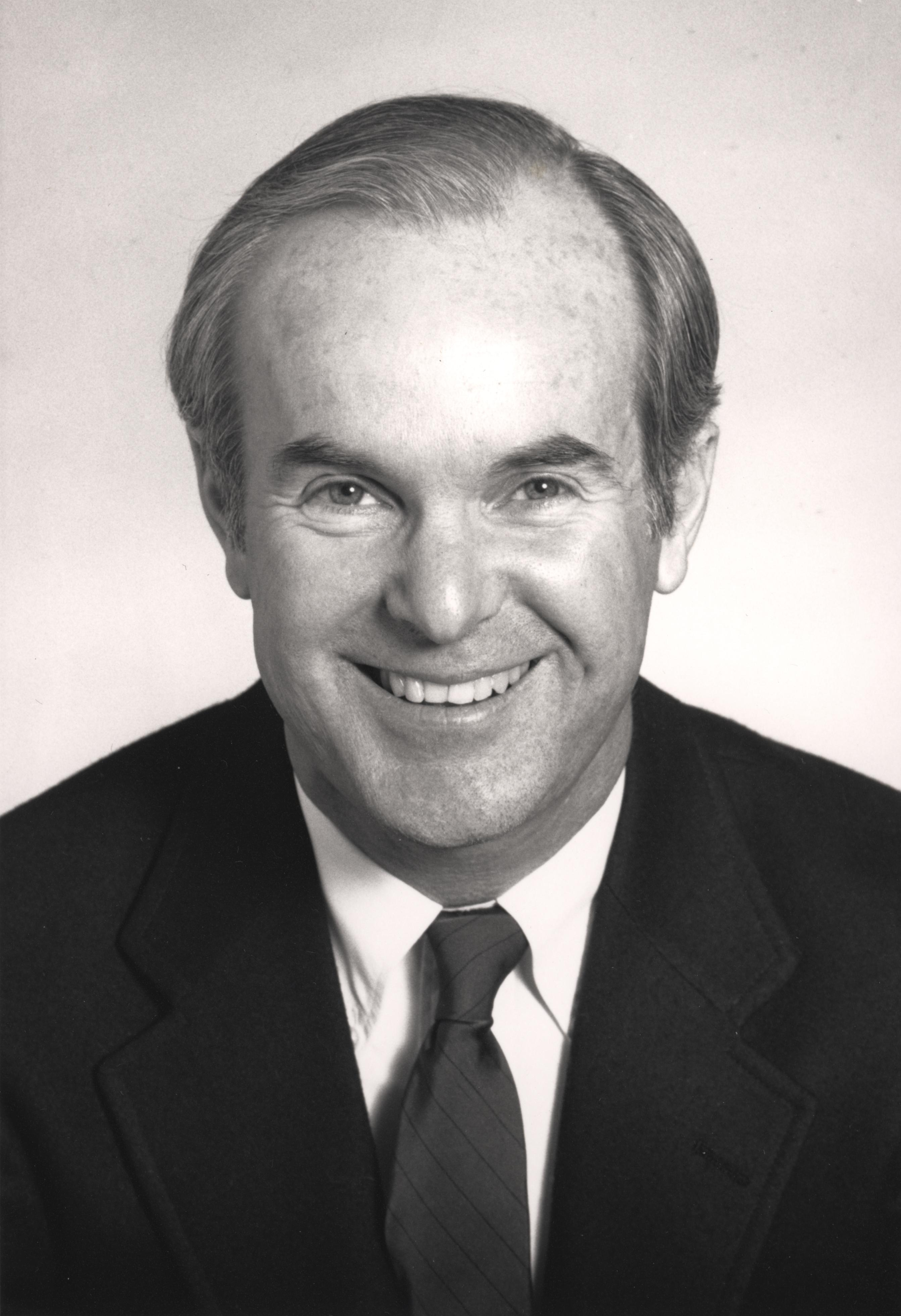

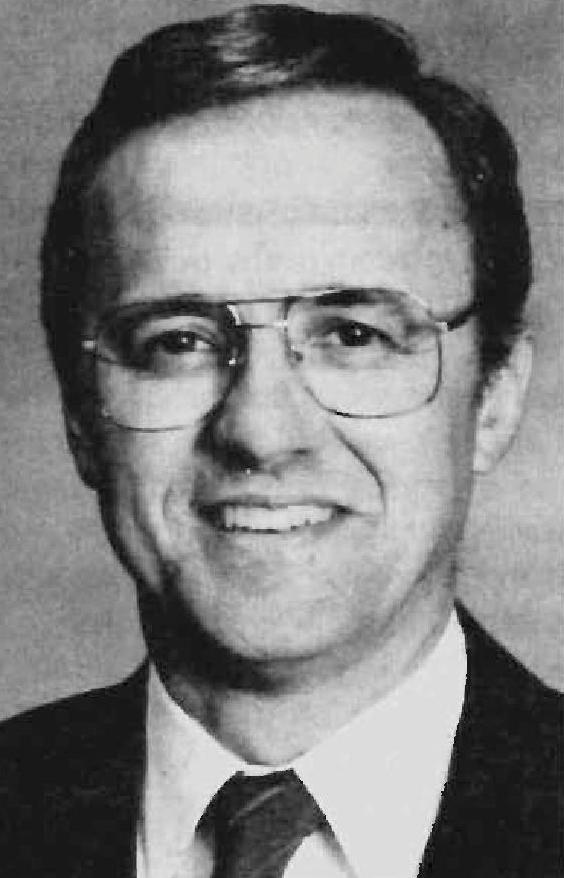
Nominee	Booth Gardner	Bob Williams
Party	Democratic	Republican
Popular vote	1,166,448	708,481
Percentage	62.21%	37.79%
- County results Gardner: 50–60% 60–70% Williams: 50–60% 60–70%
Governor before election
Booth Gardner
Democratic
Elected Governor
Booth Gardner
Democratic

The 1988 Washington gubernatorial election was held on November 8, 1988. Incumbent Democratic governor Booth Gardner won a second term, defeating Republican state representative Bob Williams in a landslide. This election was the first time since 1960 that an incumbent Democratic governor of Washington was re-elected. Gardner won the highest share of the vote since Clarence Martin in 1936.

== West Virginia ==
1988 West Virginia gubernatorial election
- November 8, 1988
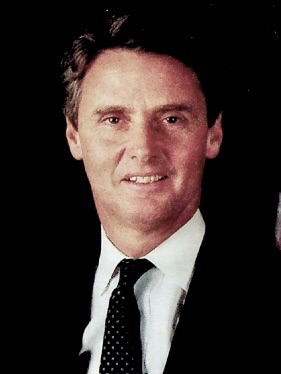

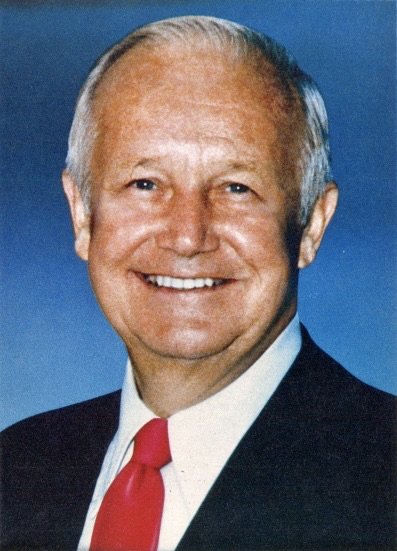
Nominee	Gaston Caperton	Arch A. Moore Jr.
Party	Democratic	Republican
Popular vote	382,421	267,172
Percentage	58.9%	41.1%
- County results Caperton: 50–60% 60–70% 70–80% Moore: 50–60% 60–70% 70–80%
Governor before election
Arch A. Moore, Jr.
Republican
Elected Governor
Gaston Caperton
Democratic

The 1988 West Virginia gubernatorial election took place on November 8, 1988 to elect the governor of West Virginia. Incumbent Republican governor Arch A. Moore Jr. ran for re-election to a fourth term in office, but was defeated by Democratic nominee Gaston Caperton.

== See also ==
- 1988 United States elections
  - 1988 United States presidential election
  - 1988 United States Senate elections
  - 1988 United States House of Representatives elections
