= 1980 United States gubernatorial elections =

- November 4, 1980

15 governorships 13 states; 2 territories
	Majority party	Minority party
Party	Democratic	Republican
Seats before	31	19
Seats after	27	23
Seat change	▼4	▲4
Seats up	10	3
Seats won	6	7
- Democratic hold Republican hold Republican gain

United States gubernatorial elections were held on November 4, 1980, in 13 states and two territories. The Republican party had a net gain of four seats in this election, coinciding with the Senate, House elections and presidential election.

As of 2026, this was the last election in which a Democrat won the gubernatorial election in Utah and also the last election in which a Republican won the gubernatorial race in the state of Washington.

== Election results ==
State	Incumbent	Party	First elected	Result	Candidates
Arkansas	Bill Clinton	Democratic	1978	Incumbent lost re-election. New governor elected. Republican gain.	✓ Frank D. White (Republican) 51.9%; Bill Clinton (Democratic) 48.1%
Delaware	Pete du Pont	Republican	1976	Incumbent re-elected.	✓ Pete du Pont (Republican) 70.7%; William J. Gordy (Democratic) 28.5%; Lawrence Levy (Libertarian) 0.8%
Indiana	Otis Bowen	Republican	1972	Incumbent term-limited. New governor elected. Republican hold.	✓ Robert D. Orr (Republican) 57.7%; John A. Hillenbrand II (Democratic) 41.9%; Cletis Artist (American) 0.4%
Missouri	Joseph P. Teasdale	Democratic	1976	Incumbent lost re-election. New governor elected. Republican gain.	✓ Kit Bond (Republican) 52.6%; Joseph P. Teasdale (Democratic) 47.0%; Helen Savio (Socialist Workers) 0.3%
Montana	Thomas Lee Judge	Democratic	1972	Incumbent lost re-nomination. New governor elected. Democratic hold.	✓ Ted Schwinden (Democratic) 55.4%; Jack Ramirez (Republican) 44.6%
New Hampshire	Hugh Gallen	Democratic	1978	Incumbent re-elected.	✓ Hugh Gallen (Democratic) 59.0%; Meldrim Thomson Jr. (Republican) 40.7%; James Pinnaird (Libertarian) 0.3%
North Carolina	Jim Hunt	Democratic	1976	Incumbent re-elected.	✓ Jim Hunt (Democratic) 61.9%; I. Beverly Lake Jr. (Republican) 37.4%; Robert Y. Emory (Libertarian) 0.5%; Douglas A. Cooper (Socialist Workers) 0.2%
North Dakota	Arthur A. Link	Democratic-NPL	1972	Incumbent lost re-election. New governor elected. Republican gain.	✓ Allen I. Olson (Republican) 53.6%; Arthur A. Link (Democratic) 46.4%
Rhode Island	J. Joseph Garrahy	Democratic	1976	Incumbent re-elected.	✓ J. Joseph Garrahy (Democratic) 73.7%; Buddy Cianci (Republican) 26.3%
Utah	Scott M. Matheson	Democratic	1976	Incumbent re-elected.	✓ Scott M. Matheson (Democratic) 55.2%; Bob Wright (Republican) 44.4%; Lawrence Rey Topham (American) 0.4%
Vermont	Richard A. Snelling	Republican	1976	Incumbent re-elected.	✓ Richard A. Snelling (Republican) 58.7%; M. Jerome Diamond (Democratic) 36.6%; Daniel E. Woodward (Independent) 2.5%; Bruce Cullen (Independent) 1.1%; John Potthast (Liberty Union) 0.9%
Washington	Dixy Lee Ray	Democratic	1976	Incumbent lost re-nomination. New governor elected. Republican gain.	✓ John Spellman (Republican) 56.7%; Jim McDermott (Democratic) 43.3%
West Virginia	Jay Rockefeller	Democratic	1976	Incumbent re-elected.	✓ Jay Rockefeller (Democratic) 54.1%; Arch A. Moore Jr. (Republican) 45.4%; Jack Kelley (Libertarian) 0.4%

=== Territories ===
Territory	Incumbent	Party	First elected	Result	Candidates
Puerto Rico	Carlos Romero Barceló	New Progressive	1976	Incumbent re-elected.	▌ ✓ Carlos Romero Barceló (PNP) 47.22%; ▌Rafael Hernández Colón (PPD) 47.03%; ▌Rubén Berríos (PIP) 5.42%

== Close states ==
States where the margin of victory was under 1%:

1. Puerto Rico, 0.2%

States where the margin of victory was under 5%:

1. Arkansas, 3.8%

States where the margin of victory was under 10%:

1. Missouri, 5.6%
2. North Dakota, 7.2%
3. West Virginia, 8.7%

== Arkansas ==
1980 Arkansas gubernatorial election
- November 4, 1980
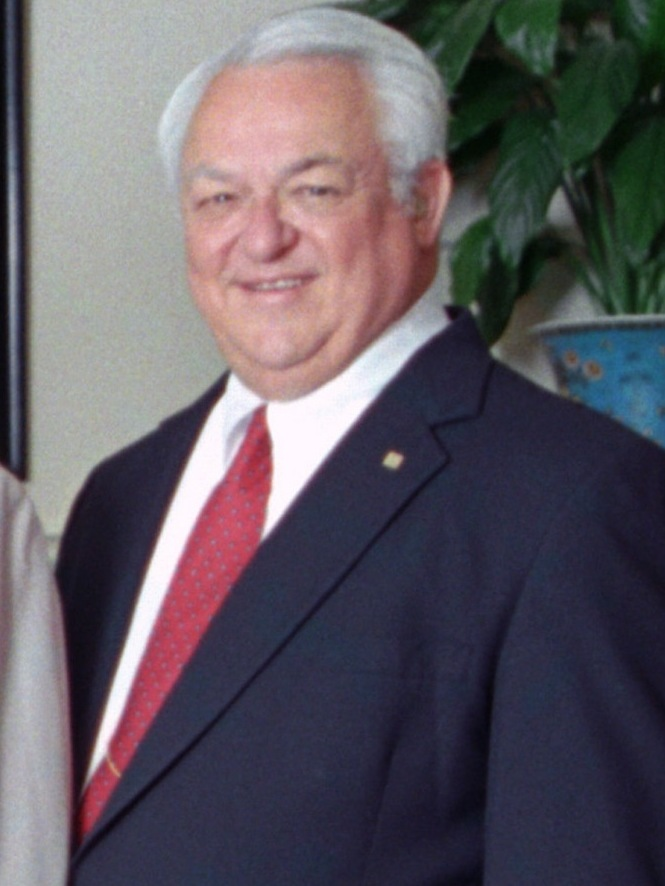

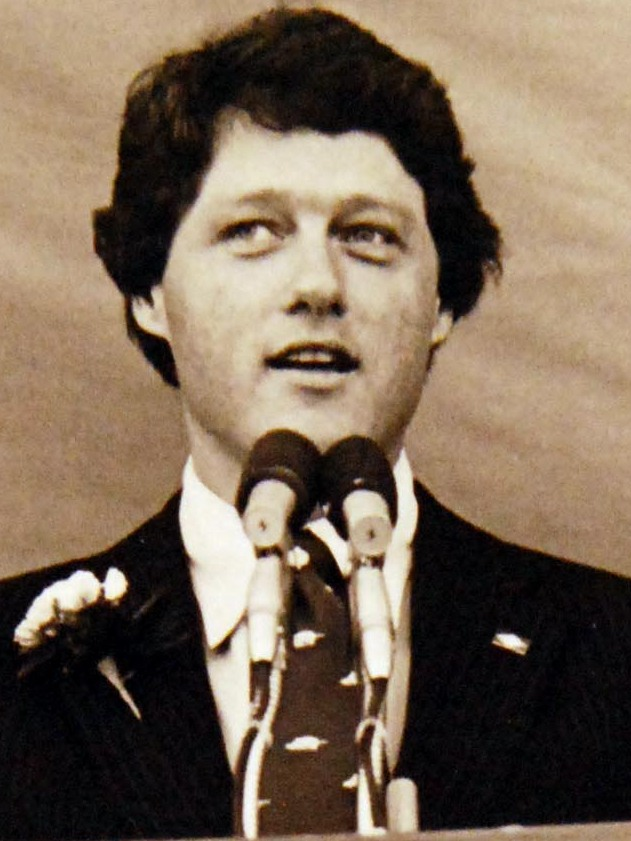
Nominee	Frank D. White	Bill Clinton
Party	Republican	Democratic
Popular vote	435,684	403,241
Percentage	51.93%	48.07%
- County results White: 50–60% 60–70% 70–80% Clinton: 50–60% 60–70%
Governor before election
Bill Clinton
Democratic
Elected Governor
Frank D. White
Republican

The 1980 Arkansas gubernatorial election was a biennial election for the governorship of Arkansas. One-term Democratic governor and future president Bill Clinton was narrowly defeated by Republican Frank D. White. It was only the third time since Reconstruction that a Republican candidate had won the state's governorship.

Clinton ran again two years later and regained the governorship, continuing to serve until he was elected to the presidency in 1992.

== Delaware ==
1980 Delaware gubernatorial election
- November 4, 1980
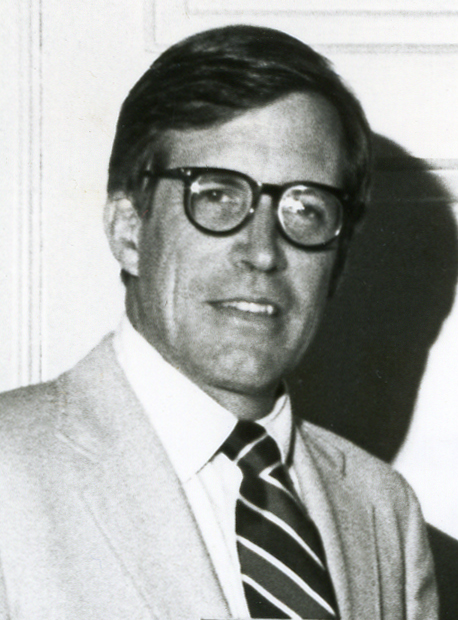

Nominee	Pete du Pont	William J. Gordy
Party	Republican	Democratic
Popular vote	159,004	64,217
Percentage	70.66%	28.54%
- du Pont: 50–60% 60–70% 70–80% 80–90% Gordy: 50–60% 60–70%
Governor before election
Pete du Pont
Republican
Elected Governor
Pete du Pont
Republican

The 1980 Delaware gubernatorial election took place on November 4, 1980. Popular incumbent Republican governor Pierre S. "Pete" du Pont IV was re-elected to a second term in office, defeating Democrat William Gordy. In doing so, du Pont became the first governor since J. Caleb Boggs to succeed in winning re-election.

== Indiana ==
1980 Indiana gubernatorial election
- November 4, 1980
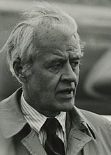

Nominee	Robert D. Orr	John A. Hillenbrand II
Party	Republican	Democratic
Popular vote	1,257,383	913,116
Percentage	57.7%	41.9%
- County results Orr: 50–60% 60–70% 70–80% Hillenbrand: 50–60% 60–70%
Governor before election
Otis Bowen
Republican
Elected Governor
Robert D. Orr
Republican

The 1980 Indiana gubernatorial election was held on November 4, 1980 in all 92 counties in the state of Indiana. Otis Bowen, the state's incumbent governor was ineligible for a third consecutive term due to term limits set forth in the Indiana Constitution. Robert D. Orr, the state's incumbent Republican lieutenant governor, was elected to his first term, defeating John A. Hillenbrand II, and a minor party challenger.

== Missouri ==
1980 Missouri gubernatorial election
- November 4, 1980
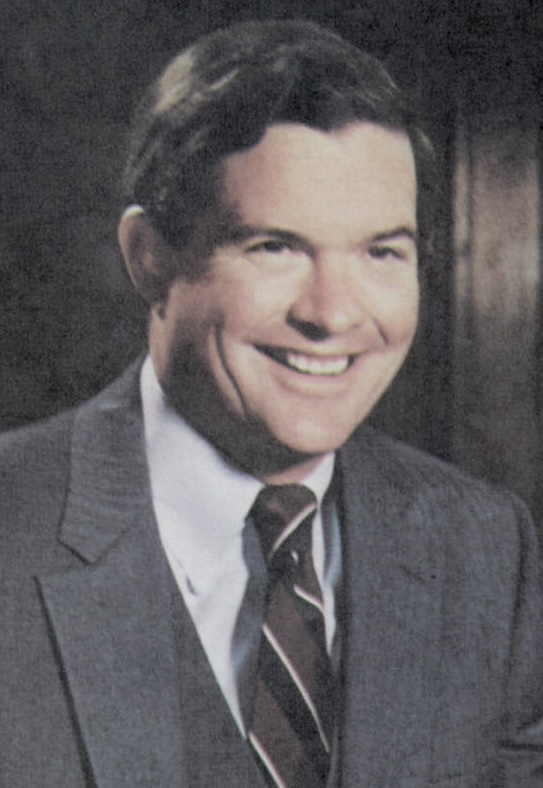

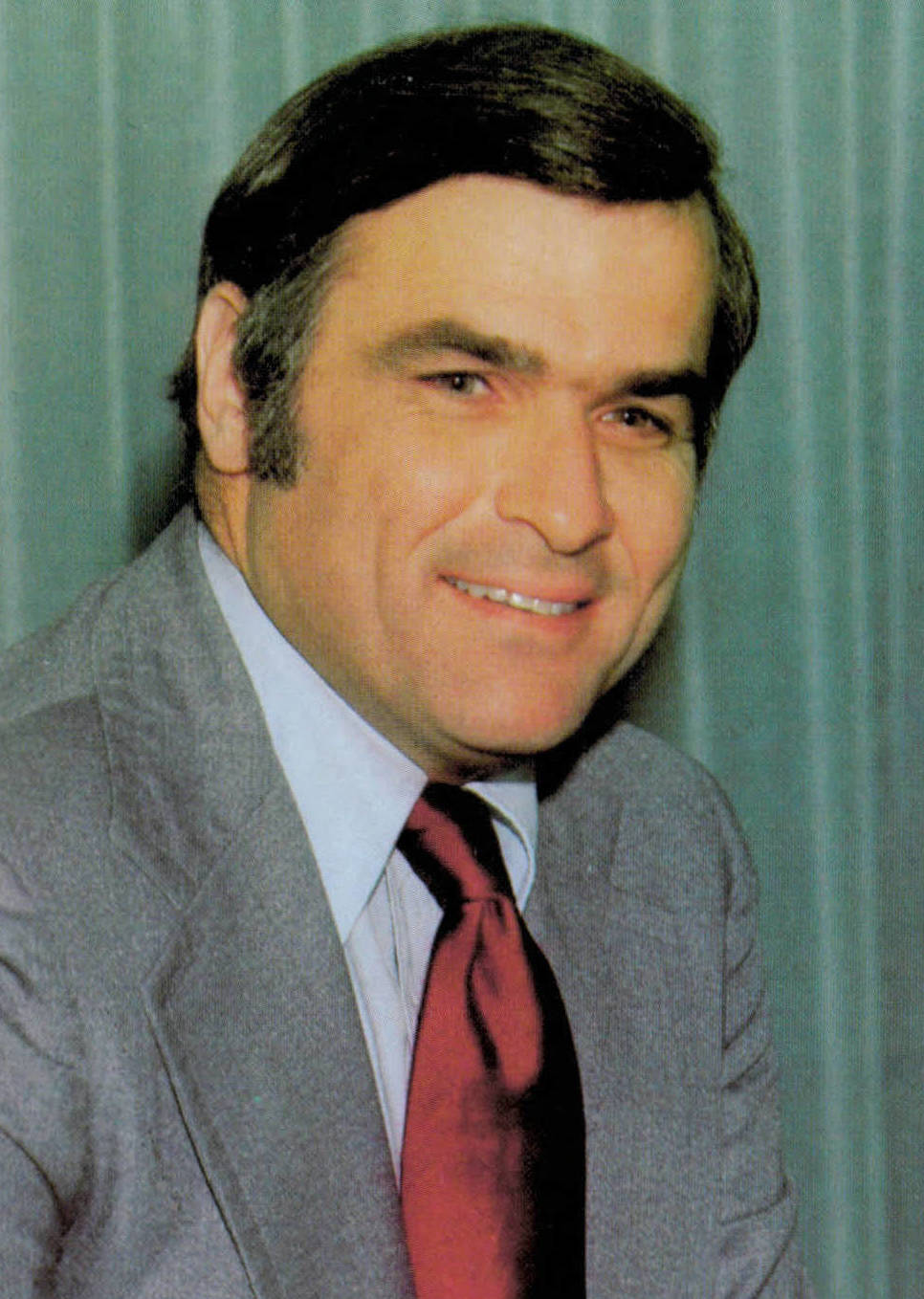
Nominee	Kit Bond	Joseph Teasdale
Party	Republican	Democratic
Popular vote	1,098,950	981,884
Percentage	52.6%	47.0%
- County results Bond: 50-60% 60-70% Teasdale: 40–50% 50–60% 60–70%
Governor before election
Joseph Teasdale
Democratic
Elected Governor
Kit Bond
Republican

The 1980 Missouri gubernatorial election was held on November 4, 1980 and resulted in a victory for the Republican nominee, former Governor Kit Bond, over the Democratic candidate, incumbent Governor Joseph P. Teasdale, and Socialist Workers candidate Helen Savio.

== Montana ==
1980 Montana gubernatorial election
- November 4, 1980
- Turnout: 74.90%▲0.30
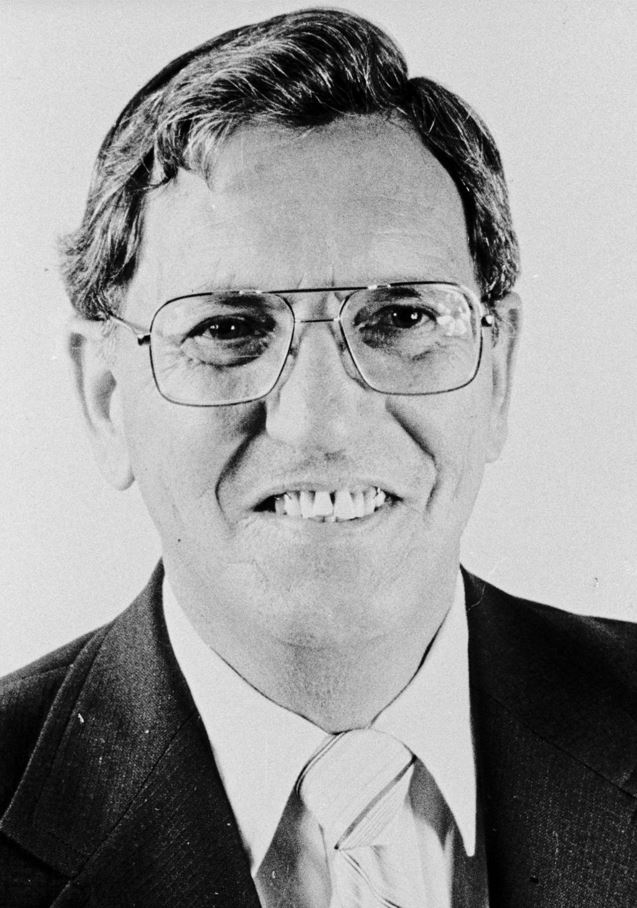

Nominee	Ted Schwinden	Jack Ramirez
Party	Democratic	Republican
Running mate	George Turman	Walt Johnson
Popular vote	199,574	160,892
Percentage	55.37%	44.63%
- County results Schwinden: 50–60% 60–70% 70–80% Ramirez: 50–60% 60–70%
Governor before election
Thomas Lee Judge
Democratic
Elected Governor
Ted Schwinden
Democratic

The 1980 Montana gubernatorial election took place on November 4, 1980. Incumbent Governor of Montana Thomas Lee Judge, who was first elected in 1972 and was re-elected in 1976, ran for re-election. He faced a stiff challenge in the Democratic primary from his lieutenant governor, Ted Schwinden, and he ultimately lost renomination. Schwinden, advancing to the general election, faced Jack Ramirez, the Minority Leader of the Montana House of Representatives and the Republican nominee. Although Ronald Reagan, the Republican presidential nominee, won the state in a landslide that year, Schwinden comfortably defeated Ramirez to win his first of two terms as governor.

== New Hampshire ==
1980 New Hampshire gubernatorial election
- November 4, 1980
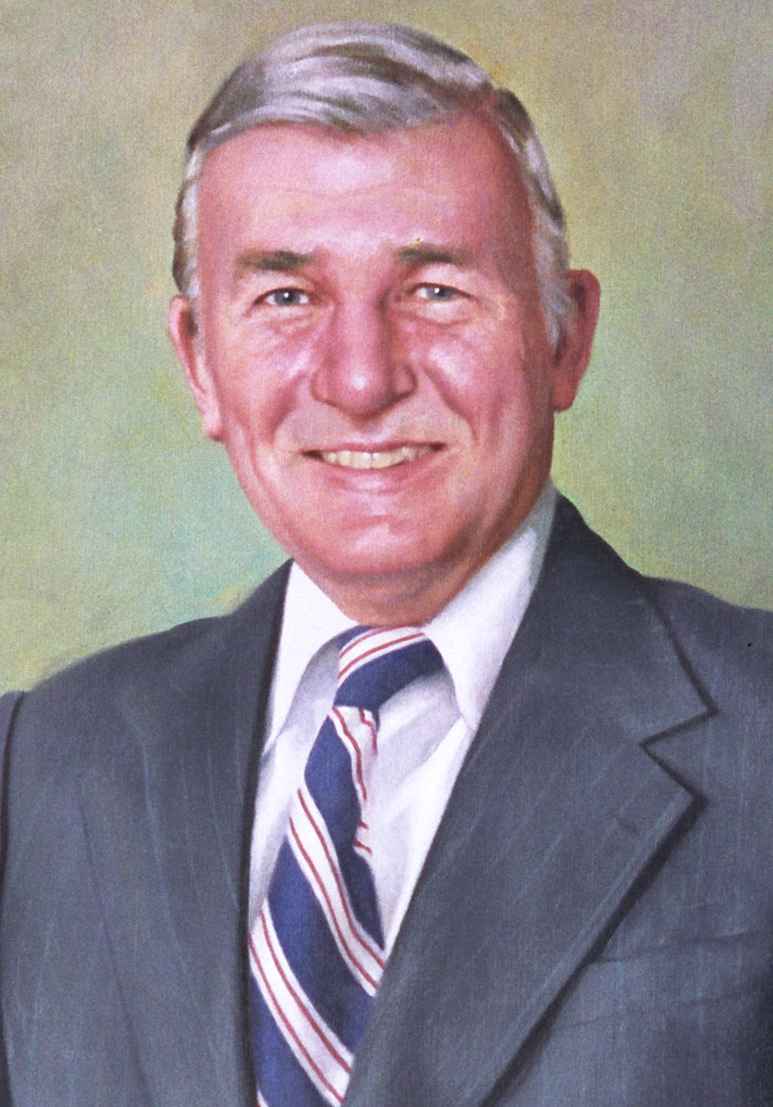

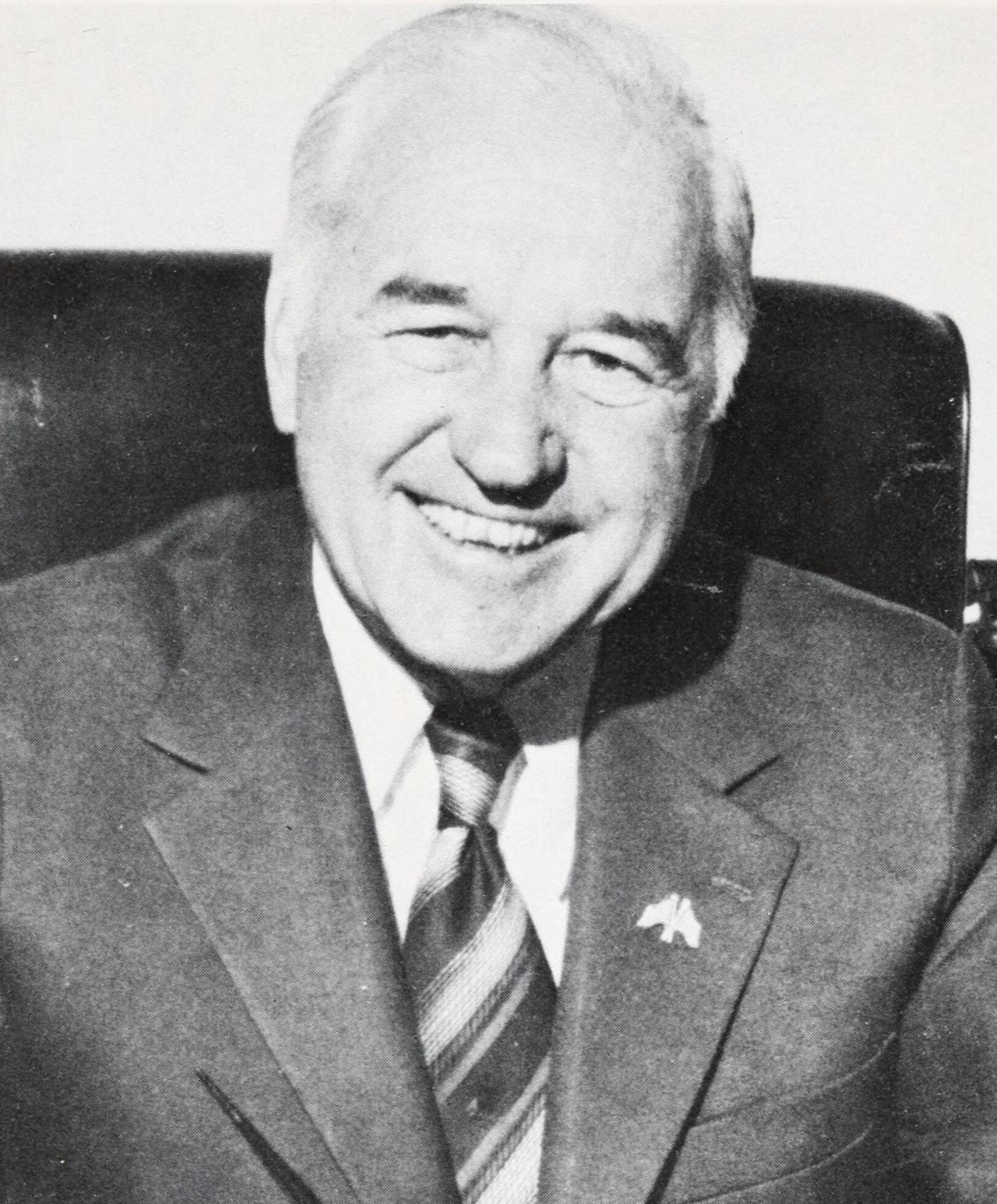
Nominee	Hugh Gallen	Meldrim Thomson Jr.
Party	Democratic	Republican
Popular vote	226,436	156,178
Percentage	58.96%	40.67%
- Gallen: 40–50% 50–60% 60–70% 70–80% 80–90% Thomson: 40–50% 50–60% 60–70% 70–80% 80–90% >90% Tie: 50%
Governor before election
Hugh Gallen
Democratic
Elected Governor
Hugh Gallen
Democratic

The 1980 New Hampshire gubernatorial election took place on November 4, 1980. Incumbent Democratic governor Hugh Gallen was re-elected to a second term in office, in a landslide. once again defeating former governor Meldrim Thomson Jr., who defeated Lou D'Allesandro for the Republican nomination.

== North Carolina ==
1980 North Carolina gubernatorial election
- November 4, 1980
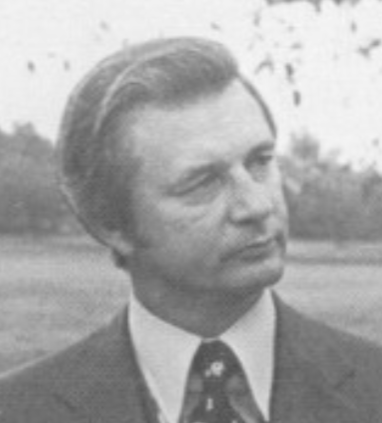

Nominee	Jim Hunt	I. Beverly Lake
Party	Democratic	Republican
Popular vote	1,143,145	691,449
Percentage	61.88%	37.43%
- County results Hunt: 50-60% 60-70% 70-80% 80-90% Lake: 50-60% 60-70%
Governor before election
Jim Hunt
Democratic
Elected Governor
Jim Hunt
Democratic

The 1980 North Carolina gubernatorial election was held on November 4, 1980. Despite North Carolina going to Ronald Reagan in the presidential race and the U.S. Senate race being won by a Republican (John P. East), popular Democratic Governor Jim Hunt won a second term in office in a landslide over Republican I. Beverly Lake. Hunt thus became the first governor of the state elected to a consecutive four-year term, following an amendment to the Constitution of North Carolina allowing such a run.

== North Dakota ==
1980 North Dakota gubernatorial election
- November 4, 1980
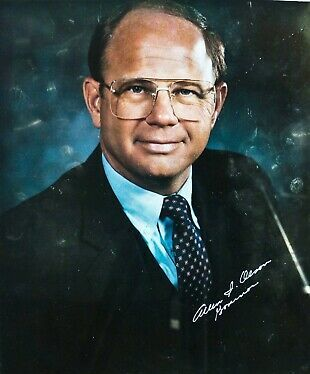

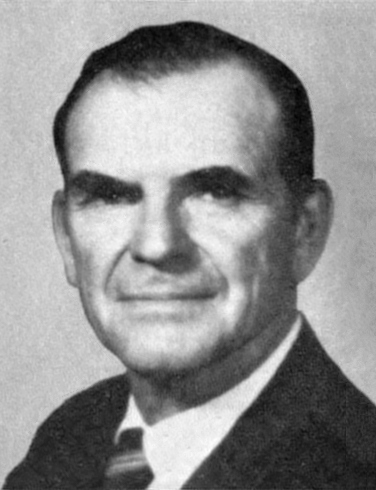
Nominee	Allen I. Olson	Arthur A. Link
Party	Republican	Democratic–NPL
Running mate	Ernest Sands	Wayne Sanstead
Popular vote	162,230	140,391
Percentage	53.6%	46.4%
- County results Olson: 50–60% 60–70% Link: 50–60% 60–70%
Governor before election
Arthur A. Link
Democratic–NPL
Elected Governor
Allen I. Olson
Republican

The 1980 North Dakota gubernatorial election was held on November 4, 1980. The election pitted Republican State Attorney General Allen I. Olson against incumbent Democratic-NPL governor Arthur A. Link. Olson Defeated Link 54% to 46%.

== Rhode Island ==
1980 Rhode Island gubernatorial election
- November 4, 1980
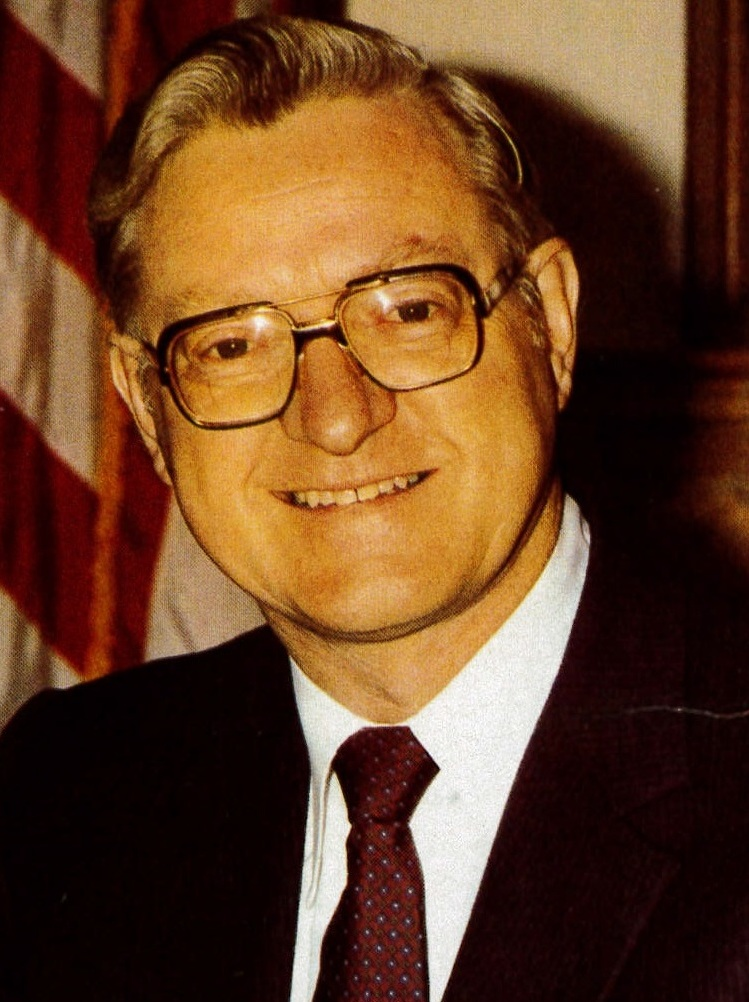
Nominee	J. Joseph Garrahy	Buddy Cianci
Party	Democratic	Republican
Popular vote	299,174	106,729
Percentage	73.71%	26.29%
- Garrahy: 60–70% 70–80% 80–90%
Governor before election
J. Joseph Garrahy
Democratic
Elected Governor
J. Joseph Garrahy
Democratic

The 1980 Rhode Island gubernatorial election was held on November 4, 1980. Incumbent Democrat J. Joseph Garrahy defeated Republican nominee Buddy Cianci with 73.71% of the vote.

== Utah ==
1980 Utah gubernatorial election
- November 4, 1980
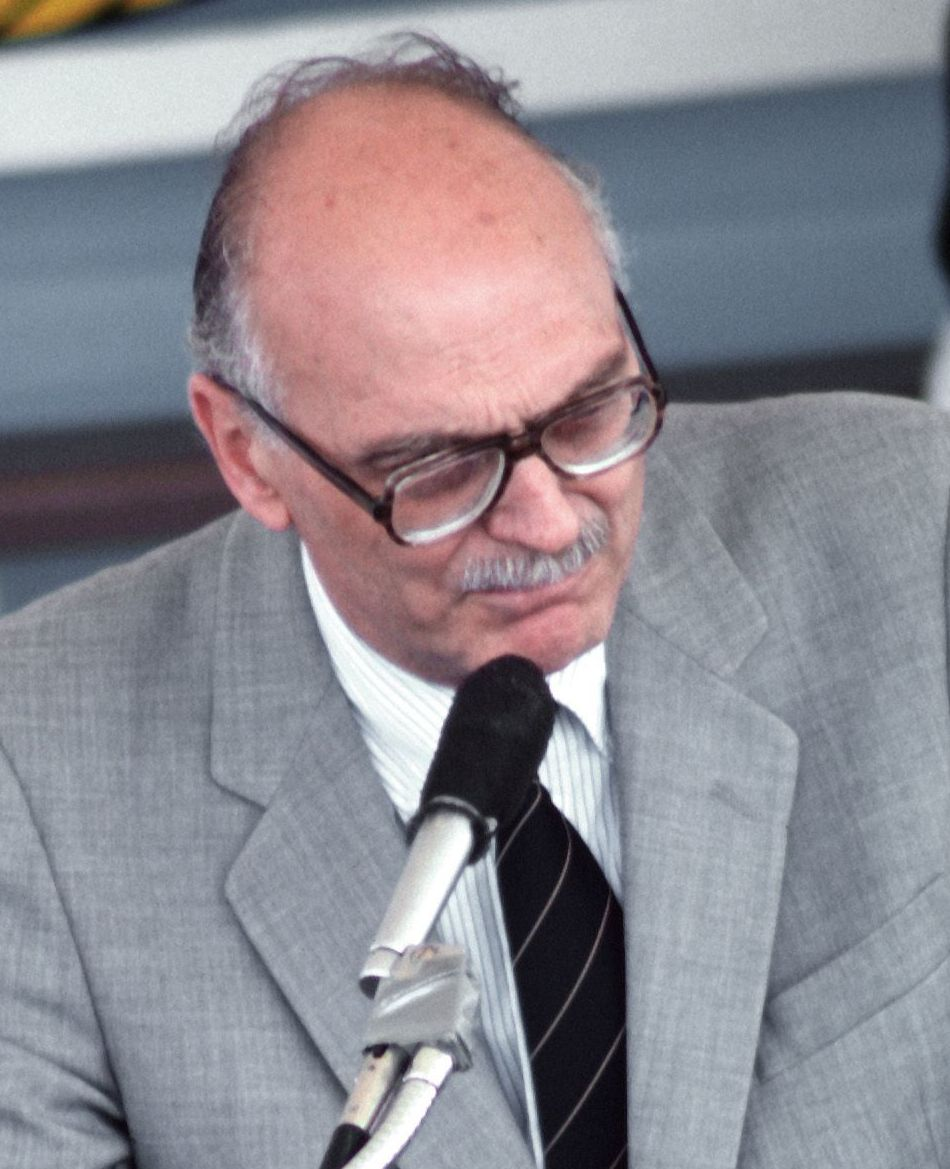

Nominee	Scott M. Matheson	Bob Wright
Party	Democratic	Republican
Popular vote	330,974	266,578
Percentage	55.16%	44.43%
- County results Matheson: 40–50% 50–60% 60–70% 70–80% Wright: 50–60%
Governor before election
Scott M. Matheson
Democratic
Elected Governor
Scott M. Matheson
Democratic

The 1980 Utah gubernatorial election was held on November 4, 1980. Democratic incumbent Scott M. Matheson defeated Republican nominee Bob Wright with 55.16% of the vote. As of 2025, this is the last time a Democrat was elected Governor of Utah; since Matheson left office in 1985, all of Utah's governors have been Republican. Matheson's victory was despite Republican presidential candidate Ronald Reagan and incumbent Republican Senator Jake Garn both winning over 70% of the vote in their respective races on the same ballot.

== Vermont ==
1980 Vermont gubernatorial election
- November 4, 1980
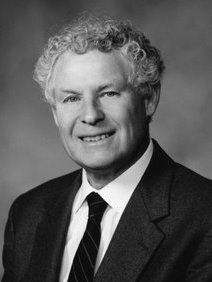

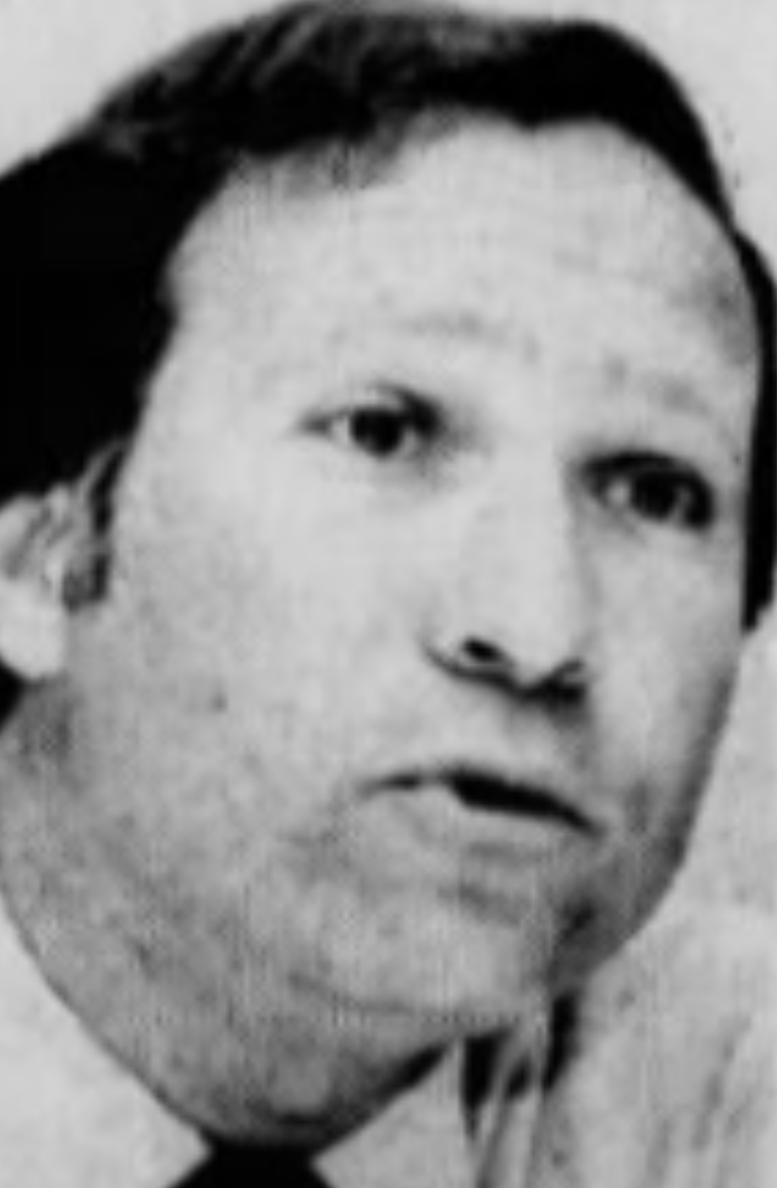
Nominee	Richard Snelling	M. Jerome Diamond
Party	Republican	Democratic
Popular vote	123,229	76,826
Percentage	58.7%	36.6%
- Snelling: 40-50% 50-60% 60-70% 70-80% 80-90% >90% Diamond: 40-50% 50-60% 60-70% Woodward: 50-60%
Governor before election
Richard Snelling
Republican
Elected Governor
Richard Snelling
Republican

The 1980 Vermont gubernatorial election took place on November 4, 1980. Incumbent Republican Richard A. Snelling ran successfully for a third term as Governor of Vermont, defeating Democratic candidate M. Jerome Diamond.

== Washington ==
1980 Washington gubernatorial election
- November 4, 1980
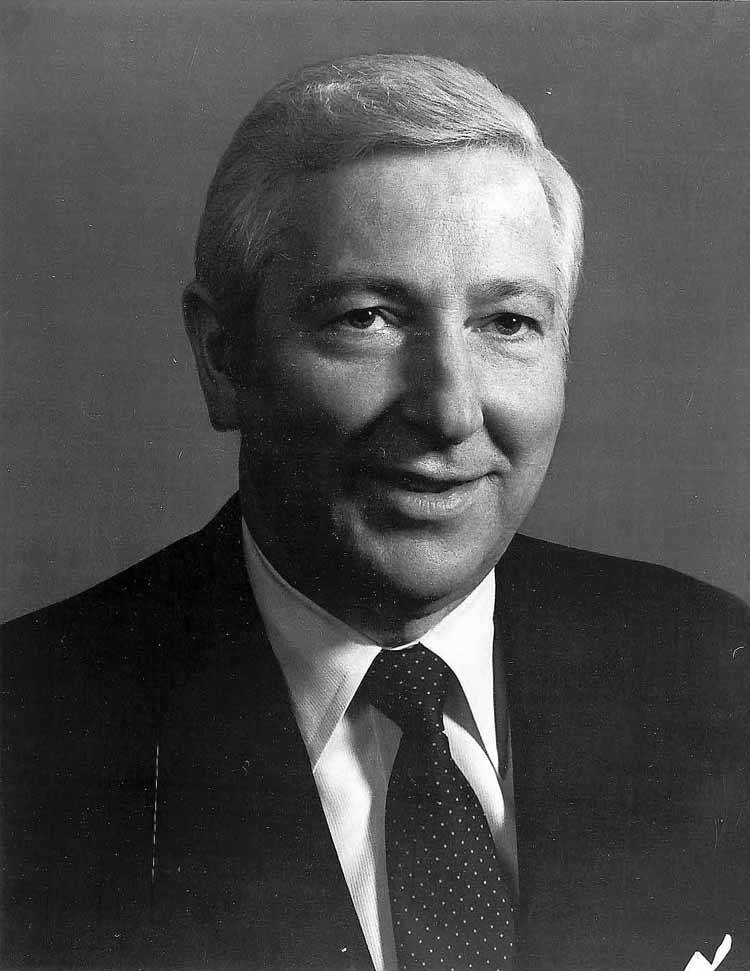

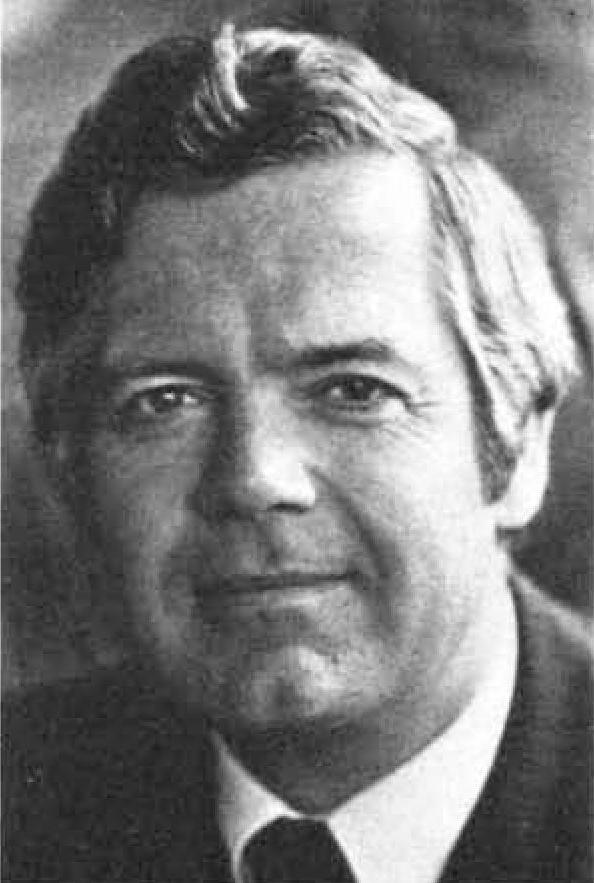
Nominee	John Spellman	Jim McDermott
Party	Republican	Democratic
Popular vote	981,083	749,813
Percentage	56.68%	43.32%
- County results Spellman: 50–60% 60–70% McDermott: 50–60%
Governor before election
Dixy Lee Ray
Democratic
Elected Governor
John Spellman
Republican

The 1980 Washington gubernatorial election was held on November 4, 1980. Incumbent Democratic governor Dixy Lee Ray ran for a second term, but lost in the primary to State Representative Jim McDermott. McDermott was defeated in the general election by Republican candidate John Spellman, the King County Executive.

== West Virginia ==
1980 West Virginia gubernatorial election
- November 4, 1980
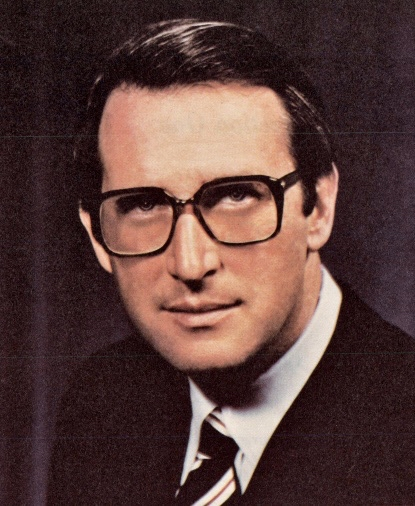

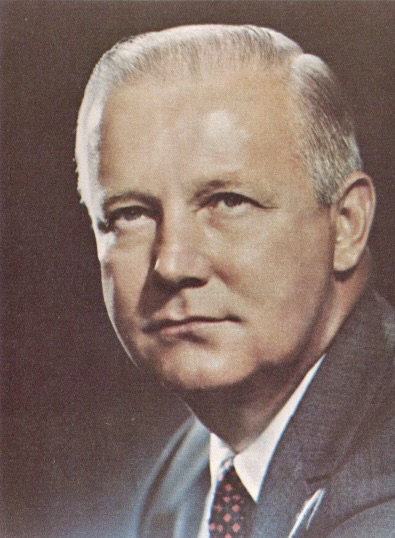
Nominee	Jay Rockefeller	Arch A. Moore Jr.
Party	Democratic	Republican
Popular vote	401,863	337,240
Percentage	54.15%	45.44%
- County results Rockefeller: 40–50% 50–60% 60–70% 70–80% Moore: 50-60% 60-70% 70-80%
Governor before election
Jay Rockefeller
Democratic
Elected Governor
Jay Rockefeller
Democratic

The 1980 West Virginia gubernatorial election took place on November 4, 1980, to elect the governor of West Virginia. Incumbent Governor Jay Rockefeller defeated former Governor Arch Moore in a rematch of the 1972 contest. This election was the first time ever that a Democrat was re-elected Governor of West Virginia.

== See also ==
- 1980 United States elections
  - 1980 United States presidential election
  - 1980 United States Senate elections
  - 1980 United States House of Representatives elections
