= 1988 Montana gubernatorial election =

- November 8, 1988
- Turnout: 75.00%
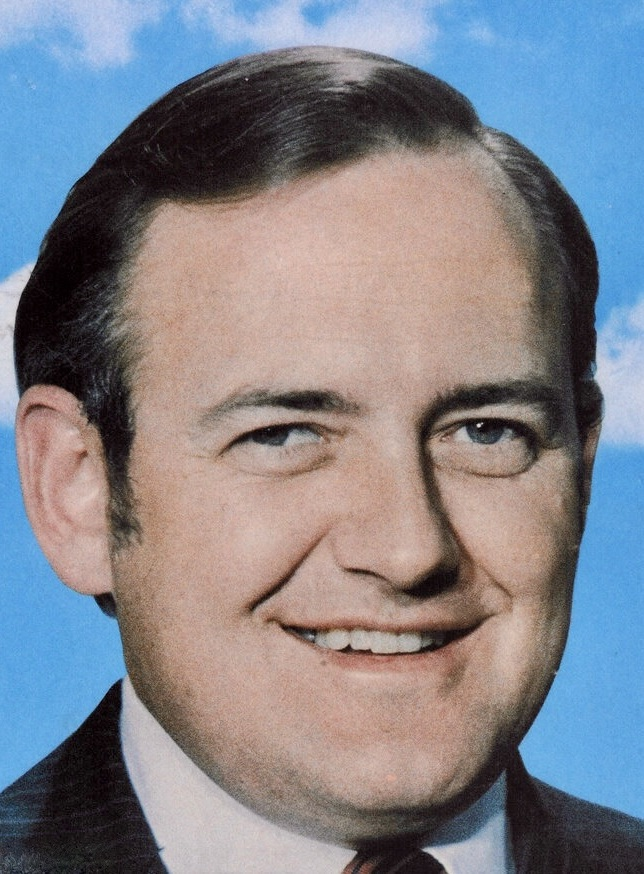
Nominee	Stan Stephens	Thomas Lee Judge
Party	Republican	Democratic
Running mate	Allen Kolstad	Barbara B. Skelton
Popular vote	190,604	169,313
Percentage	51.93%	46.13%
- Stephens: 40–50% 50–60% 60–70% 70–80% Judge: 40–50% 50–60% 60–70% 70–80%
Governor before election
Ted Schwinden
Democratic
Elected Governor
Stan Stephens
Republican

The 1988 Montana gubernatorial election took place on November 8, 1988. Incumbent Governor of Montana Ted Schwinden, who was first elected in 1980 and was re-elected in 1984, declined to seek re-election to a third term, creating an open seat. Stan Stephens, the former president of the Montana Senate, won a close Republican primary, and advanced to the general election, where he was opposed by Thomas Lee Judge, Schwinden's predecessor as governor and the Democratic nominee. Though the general election was hotly contested, Stephens ultimately defeated Judge, becoming the first Republican to win a gubernatorial election in Montana since 1964.

== Democratic primary ==
=== Candidates ===
- Thomas Lee Judge, former Governor of Montana
- Frank B. Morrison, Jr., former Montana Supreme Court Associate Justice
- Mike Greely, Attorney General of Montana
- Ted Neuman, State Senator
- Martin J. "Red" Beckman
- Curly Thornton

=== Results ===
Democratic Party primary results
Party	Candidate	Votes	%
Democratic	Thomas Lee Judge	46,412	39.31
Democratic	Frank B. Morrison, Jr.	32,124	27.21
Democratic	Mike Greely	26,827	22.72
Democratic	Ted Neuman	7,297	6.18
Democratic	Martin J. "Red" Beckman	3,360	2.85
Democratic	Curly Thornton	2,038	1.73
Total votes		118,058	100.00

== Republican primary ==
=== Candidates ===
- Stan Stephens, former president of the Montana Senate
- Carl Winslow, State Representative
- Jim Waltermire, Montana Secretary of State

=== Campaign ===
Jim Waltermire, the Montana Secretary of State, was widely perceived to be the frontrunner in the primary, but, two months before the election, he was killed in a plane crash. Following his death, the race was narrowed down to Stan Stephens and Carl Winslow, though Waltermire remained on the ballot. Stephens earned the endorsement of much of the Republican establishment in the state, and campaigned on his experience in elected office and his success in the private sector. Winslow, meanwhile, campaigned on his youth and his ability to attract new businesses to the state.

=== Results ===
Republican Primary results
Party	Candidate	Votes	%
Republican	Stan Stephens	44,022	50.07
Republican	Carl Winslow	37,875	43.08
Republican	Jim Waltermire	6,024	6.85
Total votes		87,921	100.00

== General election ==
=== Results ===
Montana gubernatorial election, 1988
Party	Candidate	Votes	%	±%
Republican	Stan Stephens	190,604	51.93%	+25.53%
Democratic	Thomas Lee Judge	169,313	46.13%	−24.21%
Libertarian	William Dee Morris	7,104	1.94%	−1.32%
Majority		21,291	5.80%	−38.14%
Turnout		367,021		
Republican gain from Democratic		Swing		

==== By congressional district ====
Stephens won both congressional districts, including one that elected a Democrat.

District	Lee Judge	Stephens	Representative
1st	47%	51%	Pat Williams
2nd	45%	53%	Ron Marlenee
