= Carol Judge =

American nurse, healthcare advocate, and First Lady of Montana

First Lady of Montana
- In role January 1, 1973 – 1980
- Governor: Thomas Lee Judge
- Preceded by: Margaret Anderson
- Succeeded by: Jean Schwinden

Personal details
- Born: Carol Ann Anderson; June 7, 1941 Los Angeles, California, U.S.
- Died: December 7, 2014 (aged 73) Helena, Montana, U.S.
- Spouse: Thomas Lee Judge (m. 1966; div. 1980)
- Children: 2
- Education: Montana State University (BS)
- Occupation: Healthcare advocate Registered nurse

Carol Ann Judge (née Anderson; June 7, 1941 – December 7, 2014) was an American healthcare advocate and registered nurse who served as the first lady of Montana from 1973 until her divorce from her husband, Governor Thomas Lee Judge in the winter of 1980. To date, she remains the youngest first lady in Montana's history.

Judge was a longtime advocate for numerous issues, including universal kindergarten, health care reform, and the ratification of the proposed Equal Rights Amendment. She worked in nursing and related fields within the healthcare industry for more than 32 years.

During her tenure as First Lady, she successfully lobbied for a new law to require mandatory immunizations for Montana school children, which was signed into law in 1979. She campaigned for improved conditions for patients at Montana's state psychiatric hospitals, including Warm Springs State Hospital and Boulder River School and Hospital (now called the Montana Developmental Center).

== Biography ==
=== Early life ===
Judge was born Carol Ann Anderson in Los Angeles, California, on June 7, 1941. Her mother Hazel Anderson, was a homemaker and dietician, and her father, Kermit Anderson, owned the Anderson Advertising Agency in Los Angeles. Her family, who were originally from Montana, returned to Helena, Montana, when she was 10 years old. She attended Bryant Elementary School and graduated from Helena High School in 1958. She received a degree in nursing with honors in 1962 from Montana State University.

Anderson was assigned to Warm Springs State Hospital, a state-owned psychiatric hospital, as a student nurse in the early 1960s. She was appalled by the poor conditions and lack of staff at Warm Springs. She later took her boyfriend and future husband, then member of the Montana House of Representatives Tom Judge, on what has been described as "a behind-the-scenes, eye-opening tour" of Warm Springs State Hospital to show the lawmaker the substandard conditions within Montana's mental hospitals.

Carol Anderson married Thomas L. Judge in 1966. The couple had two sons, Thomas Warren Judge and Patrick Lane Judge.

In 1966, Carol Judge established the Home Health Agency at St. Peter's Hospital, the first home healthcare and visitation program in Helena, Montana.

=== First Lady of Montana ===
Thomas L. Judge, a Democrat, was elected Lieutenant Governor of Montana, in 1968, defeating in 1968. He was elected Governor of Montana in 1972, defeating Ed Smith, a Republican legislator and farmer. Judge took office on January 1, 1973. Carol Judge, who was 31 years old at the time, became the youngest First Lady in the history of Montana, a record she still holds today.

Lawrence K. Pettit, Judge's 1972 campaign manager and former brother-in-law of Carol Judge, later wrote of the Judges, "Tom and Carol were like Montana's Jack and Jackie, handsome, beautiful and always well presented, with the hint of sophistication and urbanity," in his book, If You Live by the Sword: Politics and in the Making and Unmaking of a University President.

First Lady Carol Judge made improvements to the state system of hospitals and psychiatric hospitals a priority during the mid-1970s. She had first encountered poor, substandard conditions at Warm Springs State Hospital as a nursing student during the early 1960s. She visited twelve state hospitals in an effort to call attention to poor living conditions for patients. She wrote and printed a four-page, yellow brochure called "Have a Heart: The Human Side of Boulder River School and Hospital and Warm Springs State Hospital," which she distributed to state lawmakers and other influential individuals throughout Montana. In the brochure, Carol Judge wrote specifically about Warm Springs State Hospital, "Here, as in Boulder, we find a terrible shortage of staff, poor wages and inadequate housing. Patients are overcrowded in decaying buildings, which are impossible to keep clean, and this encourages the spread of disease. The drab and depressing surroundings lack stimulating things to do for learning, therapy and recreation." She included pictures of the hospitals in the publication. Governor Thomas Judge, in response to the First Lady's campaign, proposed sweeping reforms to the state's mental hospitals, which received solid support from state legislators and other groups. Montana lawmakers increased funding to improve living and working conditions at both Warm Springs State Hospital and the Boulder River School and Hospital. The government of Montana also began a deinstitutionalization of some patients, by moving them out of psychiatric hospitals and into local living centers. Opposition to the group homes was often high in local communities. In response, the operators of the group homes would invite Carol Judge, who was popular as First Lady, to their openings and events to speak with neighbors and community leaders.

In the early 1970s, Carol Judge teamed with other U.S. state first ladies to draw attention to low immunization rates among schoolchildren. The campaign became known as "Every Child in '76." In 1979, Governor Judge signed legislation to require that all Montana schoolchildren receive mandatory immunizations for certain diseases.

Carol Judge underwent treatment for alcoholism during her tenure as First Lady. She then led the campaign to legally classify alcoholism as a disease after the American Medical Association revised its own position. Montana changed its state law to reclassify alcoholism as a disease in 1975. In 1977, Carol Judge was appointed to the Liaison Panel on Alcohol Related Problems for the President's Mental Health Commission. She met with U.S. First Lady Rosalynn Carter in Washington D.C. to discuss alcoholism and mental health issues. In the 1980s, after leaving the position of First Lady, Carol Judge established a state treatment program to treat nurses with substance abuse programs.

Governor Thomas L. Judge and Carol Judge separated during the fall of 1979 and divorced during the winter of 1980, ending Judge's tenure as Montana's first lady. Their divorce has been described as public and "bitter". Her former husband lost his bid for re-election for a third term as governor in 1980, losing the Democratic primary election to his Lieutenant Governor, Ted Schwinden. Schwinden was elected Governor in the 1980 gubernatorial election.

=== Return to nursing ===
Carol Judge returned to the nursing and healthcare fields after her divorce from the Governor. She received a master's degree in psychiatric nursing from Montana State University in 1983. She spearheaded the creation of a new state program to treat nurses from substance abuse during the 1980s.

Judge joined the staff of Fort Harrison Veterans Hospital in 1985, where she worked for the next 22-years.

During the 2000s, Judge collaborated with other former First Ladies of Montana and a legislator to advocate for the immunization of children by the time they turn 2-years old. In 2006, Carol Judge traveled to Arizona to care for her former husband, Thomas Lee Judge, as his health deteriorated. Thomas Judge died from pulmonary fibrosis in Chandler, Arizona, on September 8, 2006.

Honorary titles
Preceded by Margaret Anderson	First Lady of Montana; 1973 — 1980	Succeeded by Jean Schwinden
