= Bill Christiansen =

American politician (1914–2000)

25th Lieutenant Governor of Montana
- In office January 1, 1973 – January 3, 1977
- Governor: Thomas Lee Judge
- Preceded by: Thomas Lee Judge
- Succeeded by: Ted Schwinden

Minority leader of the Montana House of Representatives
- In office 1971 – January 1, 1973

Member of the Montana House of Representatives
- In office 1965–1973

Personal details
- Born: Edward William Christiansen Jr. February 24, 1914 Fargo, North Dakota, U.S.
- Died: March 28, 2000 (aged 86) Helena, Montana, U.S.
- Party: Democratic
- Spouse: Hattie James
- Parents: Edward William Christiansen (father); Mabel C. Cork (mother)
- Education: North Dakota State University

Edward William Christiansen Jr. (February 24, 1914 – March 28, 2000) was an American politician who served as a state representative and lieutenant governor in Montana.

== Life ==
On February 24, 1914, Edward William Christiansen Jr. was born to Edward William Christiansen and Mabel C. Cork in Fargo, North Dakota. After graduating from North Dakota State University he married Hattie James on December 27, 1947, and moved to Hardin, Montana.

In 1964, he was elected to the Montana House of Representatives after defeating Republican Sam Denny and also served as one of Montana's presidential delegates to the 1964 Democratic National Convention. In 1971, the Democratic caucus in the House elected him as the House Minority Leader.

Although he was initially interested in running for governor in the 1972 election, he later chose to run for lieutenant governor after incumbent Lieutenant Governor Thomas Lee Judge announced that he would run for the governorship. Christiansen won the lieutenant gubernatorial election, but announced in 1976 that he wouldn't seek reelection and rejected a draft movement that attempted to have him primary Governor Thomas Lee Judge. During the 1980 Democratic Party presidential primaries he endorsed Senator Ted Kennedy.

On March 28, 2000, Christiansen died in Helena, Montana.

== Electoral history ==
1964 Montana House of Representatives election
Party	Candidate	Votes	%
Democratic	Bill Christiansen	2,552	62.37%
Republican	Sam Denny	1,540	37.63%
Total votes		4,092	100.00%

1972 Montana Lieutenant Governor election
Party	Candidate	Votes	%	±%
Democratic	Bill Christiansen	174,656	57.07%	+2.97%
Republican	Harold Hanson	131,403	42.93%	−2.97%
Total votes		306,059	100.00%	
