= 1976 Montana gubernatorial election =

- November 2, 1976
- Turnout: 74.60%▼10.00
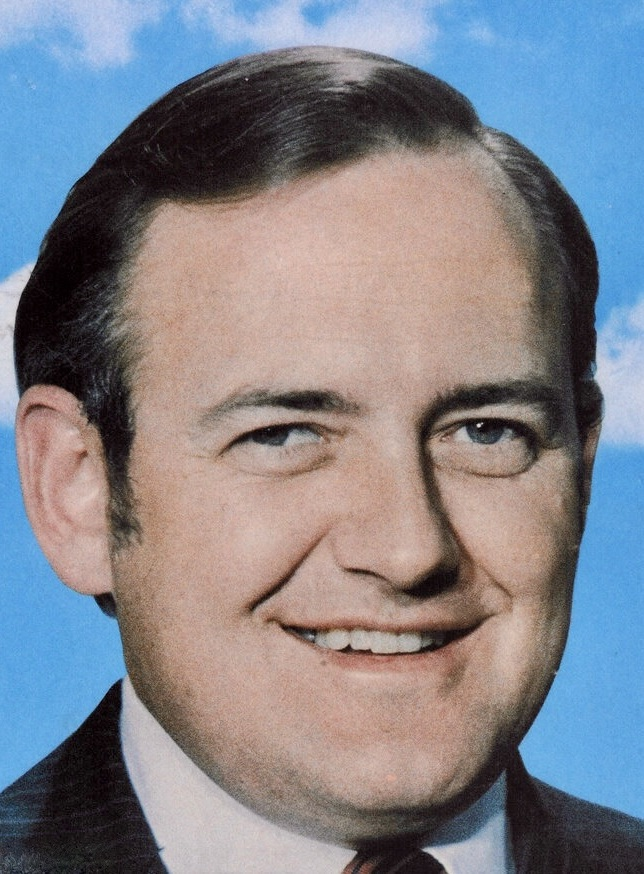

Nominee	Thomas Lee Judge	Bob Woodahl
Party	Democratic	Republican
Running mate	Ted Schwinden	Antoinette Fraser Rosell
Popular vote	195,420	115,848
Percentage	61.70%	36.58%
- County results Judge: 40–50% 50–60% 60–70% Woodahl: 40–50% 50–60% Mahoney: 50–60%
Governor before election
Thomas Lee Judge
Democratic
Elected Governor
Thomas Lee Judge
Democratic

The 1976 Montana gubernatorial election took place on November 2, 1976. Incumbent Governor of Montana Thomas Lee Judge, who was first elected in 1972, ran for re-election. He won the Democratic primary unopposed, and moved on to the general election, where he was opposed by Bob Woodahl, the Attorney General of Montana and the Republican nominee. Ultimately, Judge defeated Woodahl by a landslide to win his second and final term as governor.

== Democratic primary ==
=== Candidates ===
- Thomas Lee Judge, incumbent Governor of Montana

=== Results ===
Democratic Party primary results
Party	Candidate	Votes	%
Democratic	Thomas Lee Judge (incumbent)	79,596	100.00
Total votes		79,596	100.00

== Republican primary ==
=== Candidates ===
- Bob Woodahl, Attorney General of Montana
- Jack McDonald, State Senator

=== Results ===
Republican Primary results
Party	Candidate	Votes	%
Republican	Bob Woodahl	47,629	56.67
Republican	Jack McDonald	36,420	43.33
Total votes		84,049	100.00

== General election ==
=== Results ===
Montana gubernatorial election, 1976
Party	Candidate	Votes	%	±%
Democratic	Thomas Lee Judge (incumbent)	195,420	61.70%	+7.58%
Republican	Bob Woodahl	115,848	36.58%	−9.30%
Independent	Charlie Mahoney	5,452	1.72%	
Majority		79,572	25.12%	+16.88%
Turnout		316,720		
Democratic hold		Swing		
