= Gordon McOmber =

American politician (1919–2018)

W. Gordon McOmber

24th Lieutenant Governor of Montana
- In office January 4, 1988 – January 2, 1989
- Governor: Ted Schwinden
- Preceded by: George Turman
- Succeeded by: Allen Kolstad

Member of the Montana House of Representatives

Member of the Montana Senate

Personal details
- Born: October 2, 1919 Magrath, Alberta, Canada
- Died: August 24, 2018 (aged 98) Great Falls, Montana, U.S.
- Resting place: Sunset Hills Cemetery, Fairfield, MT
- Party: Democratic
- Children: Dennis, Gene, and Sandra
- Occupation: Farmer

Willis Gordon McOmber (October 2, 1919 – August 24, 2018) was an American politician from Montana. He served in the Montana House of Representatives and Montana State Senate as a Democrat, having first been elected in 1954. McOmber also served as Lieutenant Governor of Montana to fill out the unexpired term of George Turman when he resigned in 1988.

McOmber's time as Lieutenant Governor occurred when Montana was making preparations for its centennial year. He served as the chairman of Montana's Statehood Centennial Commission which successfully lobbied the U.S. Postal Service to design a stamp commemorating Montana's 100th anniversary.

Political offices
Preceded by George Turman	Lieutenant Governor of Montana; 1988–1989	Succeeded by Allen Kolstad
