= 1984 Montana gubernatorial election =

- November 6, 1984
- Turnout: 75.00%▲0.10
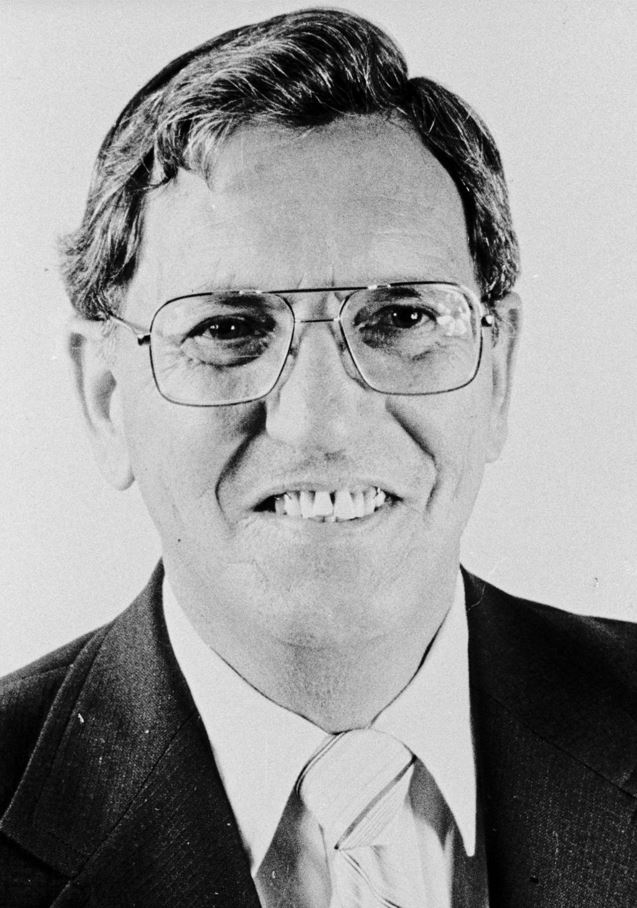

Nominee	Ted Schwinden	Pat M. Goodover
Party	Democratic	Republican
Running mate	George Turman	Don Allen
Popular vote	266,578	100,070
Percentage	70.34%	26.41%
- Schwinden: 50–60% 60–70% 70–80% 80–90%
Governor before election
Ted Schwinden
Democratic
Elected Governor
Ted Schwinden
Democratic

The 1984 Montana gubernatorial election took place on November 6, 1984. Incumbent Governor of Montana Ted Schwinden, who was first elected in 1980, ran for re-election. Schwinden won the Democratic primary against a perennial candidate, and moved on to the general election, where he faced Pat M. Goodover, a State Senator and the Republican nominee. Although then-President Ronald Reagan won the state in a landslide that year in the presidential election, Schwinden defeated Goodover with over 70% of the vote to win his second and final term as governor. This was the last time that Democrats won a gubernatorial election in Montana until 2004.

== Democratic primary ==
=== Candidates ===
- Ted Schwinden, incumbent Governor of Montana
- Bob Kelleher, perennial candidate

=== Results ===
Democratic Party primary results
Party	Candidate	Votes	%
Democratic	Ted Schwinden (incumbent)	80,633	81.40
Democratic	Bob Kelleher	18,423	18.60
Total votes		99,056	100.00

== Republican primary ==
=== Candidates ===
- Pat M. Goodover, State Senator

=== Results ===
Republican Primary results
Party	Candidate	Votes	%
Republican	Pat M. Goodover	56,199	100.00
Total votes		56,199	100.00

== General election ==
=== Results ===
Montana gubernatorial election, 1984
Party	Candidate	Votes	%	±%
Democratic	Ted Schwinden (incumbent)	266,578	70.34%	+14.98%
Republican	Pat M. Goodover	100,070	26.41%	−18.23%
Libertarian	Larry Dodge	12,322	3.25%	
Majority		166,508	43.94%	+33.21%
Turnout		378,970		
Democratic hold		Swing		

==== By congressional district ====
Schwinden won both congressional districts, including one that elected a Republican.

District	Schwinden	Goodover	Representative
1st	71%	26%	Pat Williams
2nd	70%	27%	Ron Marlenee
