= Stan Stephens =

Canadian-American politician (1929–2021)

20th Governor of Montana
- In office January 2, 1989 – January 4, 1993
- Lieutenant: Allen Kolstad; Denny Rehberg
- Preceded by: Ted Schwinden
- Succeeded by: Marc Racicot

President of the Montana Senate
- In office 1983–1985
- Preceded by: Jean Turnage
- Succeeded by: Bill Norman

Personal details
- Born: Stanley Graham Stephens; September 16, 1929 Calgary, Alberta, Canada
- Died: April 3, 2021 (aged 91) Kalispell, Montana, U.S.
- Party: Republican
- Spouse: Ann Hanson

Stanley Graham Stephens (September 16, 1929 – April 3, 2021) was a Canadian-American politician, journalist, and broadcaster who served as the 20th governor of Montana from 1989 until 1993 as a member of the Republican Party.

== Biography ==
Born in Calgary, Alberta, Canada in 1929, Stephens was educated in public schools, but dropped out of high school. He moved to Montana when he was nineteen. He married Ann Hanson and the couple had two children.

== Career ==
Stephens' 38-year career in broadcasting included his being drafted into service with the U.S. Armed Forces Broadcast Network during the Korean War. Stephens and Lyle Leeds, co-owners of KOJM Radio, in Havre, Montana, from 1953 to 1985, guided the station to a policy of fund-raisers and free air time to individuals to speak on issues. Developing the art of radio editorials, in 1975, Stephens earned the Edward R. Murrow award for journalistic excellence in editorials for uncovering a scandal in the Montana Workers' Compensation Program.

Stephens began his political career in 1969 with his election to the Montana State Senate and in his 16-year tenure, he served as floor whip, majority leader, and senate president. In 1986 Stephens was recognized by the National Republican Legislators' Association as one of the country's ten most outstanding state lawmakers.

In 1988, when incumbent Governor of Montana Ted Schwinden declined to seek re-election to a third term, Stephens ran to succeed him. He narrowly won the Republican primary, and, in the general election, defeated former Governor Thomas Lee Judge by a slim margin. During his tenure as governor, he served on the White House Advisory Council on Intergovernmental Affairs, and he oversaw the 1989 Montana Statehood Centennial celebration. He declined to seek re-election in 1992, and was succeeded by Marc Racicot.

== See also ==
- List of United States governors born outside the United States

Party political offices
Preceded by Pat Goodover	Republican nominee for Governor of Montana; 1988	Succeeded by Marc Racicot
Political offices
Preceded by Ted Schwinden	Governor of Montana; 1989–1993	Succeeded by Marc Racicot
