= 1980 Montana gubernatorial election =

- November 4, 1980
- Turnout: 74.90%▲0.30
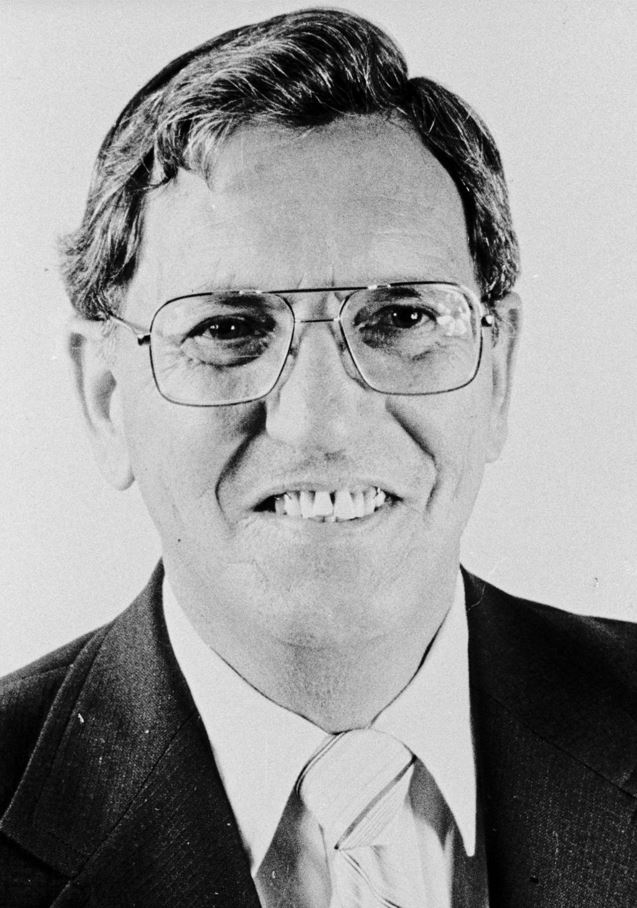

Nominee	Ted Schwinden	Jack Ramirez
Party	Democratic	Republican
Running mate	George Turman	Walt Johnson
Popular vote	199,574	160,892
Percentage	55.37%	44.63%
- County results Schwinden: 50–60% 60–70% 70–80% Ramirez: 50–60% 60–70%
Governor before election
Thomas Lee Judge
Democratic
Elected Governor
Ted Schwinden
Democratic

The 1980 Montana gubernatorial election took place on November 4, 1980. Incumbent Governor of Montana Thomas Lee Judge, who was first elected in 1972 and was re-elected in 1976, ran for re-election. He faced a stiff challenge in the Democratic primary from his lieutenant governor, Ted Schwinden, and he ultimately lost renomination. Schwinden, advancing to the general election, faced Jack Ramirez, the Minority Leader of the Montana House of Representatives and the Republican nominee. Although Ronald Reagan, the Republican presidential nominee, won the state in a landslide that year, Schwinden comfortably defeated Ramirez to win his first of two terms as governor.

== Democratic primary ==
=== Candidates ===
- Ted Schwinden, Lieutenant Governor of Montana
- Thomas Lee Judge, incumbent Governor of Montana
- Martin J. Beckman
- Bob Kelleher, perennial candidate

=== Results ===
Democratic Party primary results
Party	Candidate	Votes	%
Democratic	Ted Schwinden	69,051	50.64
Democratic	Thomas Lee Judge (incumbent)	57,946	42.49
Democratic	Martin J. Beckman	5,990	4.39
Democratic	Bob Kelleher	3,377	2.48
Total votes		136,364	100.00

== Republican primary ==
=== Candidates ===
- Jack Ramirez, Minority Leader of the Montana House of Representatives
- Al Bishop, Montana Fish and Game Commissioner
- Florence Haegen, former Chairwoman of the Montana Republican Party

=== Results ===
Republican Primary results
Party	Candidate	Votes	%
Republican	Jack Ramirez	48,926	68.36
Republican	Al Bishop	14,522	20.30
Republican	Florence Haegen	8,118	11.34
Total votes		71,566	100.00

== General election ==
=== Results ===
Montana gubernatorial election, 1980
Party	Candidate	Votes	%	±%
Democratic	Ted Schwinden	199,574	55.37%	−6.34%
Republican	Jack Ramirez	160,892	44.63%	+8.06%
Majority		38,682	10.73%	−14.39%
Turnout		360,466		
Democratic hold		Swing		
