= Allen Kolstad =

American politician (1931–2008)

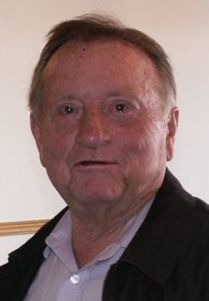

29th Lieutenant Governor of Montana
- In office January 2, 1989 – January 20, 1991
- Governor: Stan Stephens
- Preceded by: Gordon McOmber
- Succeeded by: Denny Rehberg

Personal details
- Born: December 24, 1931 Chester, Montana, U.S.
- Died: August 2, 2008 (aged 76) Chester, Montana, U.S.

Allen C. Kolstad (December 24, 1931 – August 2, 2008) was an American politician from Montana. A Republican from Chester in Liberty County, Montana, he was prominent in state politics for more than 40 years, beginning in 1968 with his election to the state House of Representatives. He served in the state House and later the Senate for 20 years until he was elected the 25th Lieutenant Governor of Montana on the ticket headed by Stan Stephens in 1988.

Kolstad ran unsuccessfully for U.S. Senate in the 1990 election, losing to incumbent Democratic Senator Max Baucus. He resigned from the post of lieutenant governor in 1991 to accept a presidential appointment to the International Boundary Commission.

Kolstad was elected Montana's Republican national committeeman in 2004 to a term expiring in September 2009, but he resigned on December 15, 2007, for health reasons.

Party political offices
| Preceded by Chuck Cozzens | Republican nominee for U.S. Senator from Montana (Class 2); 1990 | Succeeded by Denny Rehberg |
Political offices
| Preceded by Gordon McOmber | Lieutenant Governor of Montana; 1989–1991 | Succeeded by Denny Rehberg |
