= Thomas Lee Judge =

American politician (1934–2006)

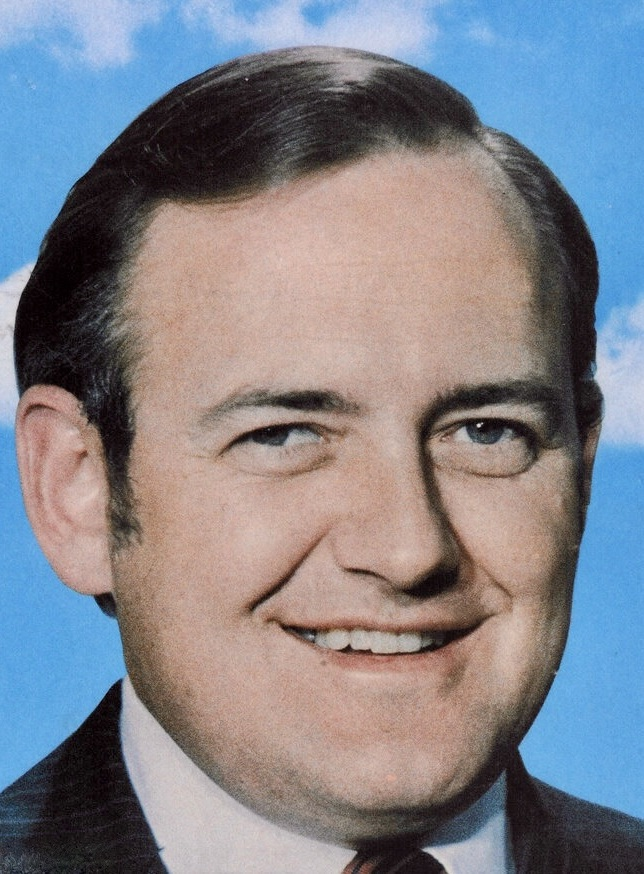

18th Governor of Montana
- In office January 1, 1973 – January 5, 1981
- Lieutenant: Bill Christiansen; Ted Schwinden
- Preceded by: Forrest H. Anderson
- Succeeded by: Ted Schwinden

25th Lieutenant Governor of Montana
- In office January 6, 1969 – January 1, 1973
- Governor: Forrest H. Anderson
- Preceded by: Ted James
- Succeeded by: Bill Christiansen

11th Chair of the National Lieutenant Governors Association
- In office 1972
- Preceded by: Roger Jepsen
- Succeeded by: Martin J. Schreiber

Member of the Montana Senate
- In office 1967-1969

Member of the Montana House of Representatives
- In office 1961–1967

Personal details
- Born: October 12, 1934 Helena, Montana, U.S.
- Died: September 8, 2006 (aged 71) Chandler, Arizona, U.S.
- Party: Democratic
- Spouses: Carol Ann Anderson (m. 1966; div. 1980) Suzan Koch (m. 1981; div. 2003)
- Occupation: Politician

Military service
- Allegiance: United States
- Branch/service: United States Army
- Years of service: 1958-1964
- Rank: Captain
- Unit: Reserves; United States Army Adjutant General Corps

Thomas Lee Judge (October 12, 1934 – September 8, 2006) was an American politician who served as the 18th governor of Montana from 1973 to 1981. A member of the Democratic Party, he previously served as the 25th lieutenant governor of Montana from 1969 to 1973.

== Biography ==
Judge was born in Helena, Montana. He earned a bachelor's degree in journalism from the University of Notre Dame and did his graduate study at the University of Louisville. He graduated from the United States Army Adjutant General School at Fort Benjamin Harrison, Indiana.

Judge married Carol Anderson in 1966. The couple had two sons, Thomas Warren Judge and Patrick Lane Judge. The Judges, who were serving as governor and first lady of Montana, separated in the fall of 1979 and divorced during the winter of 1980. Judge then married his second wife, Suzan Koch, in 1981. Judge and Koch separated in 2003.

== Career ==
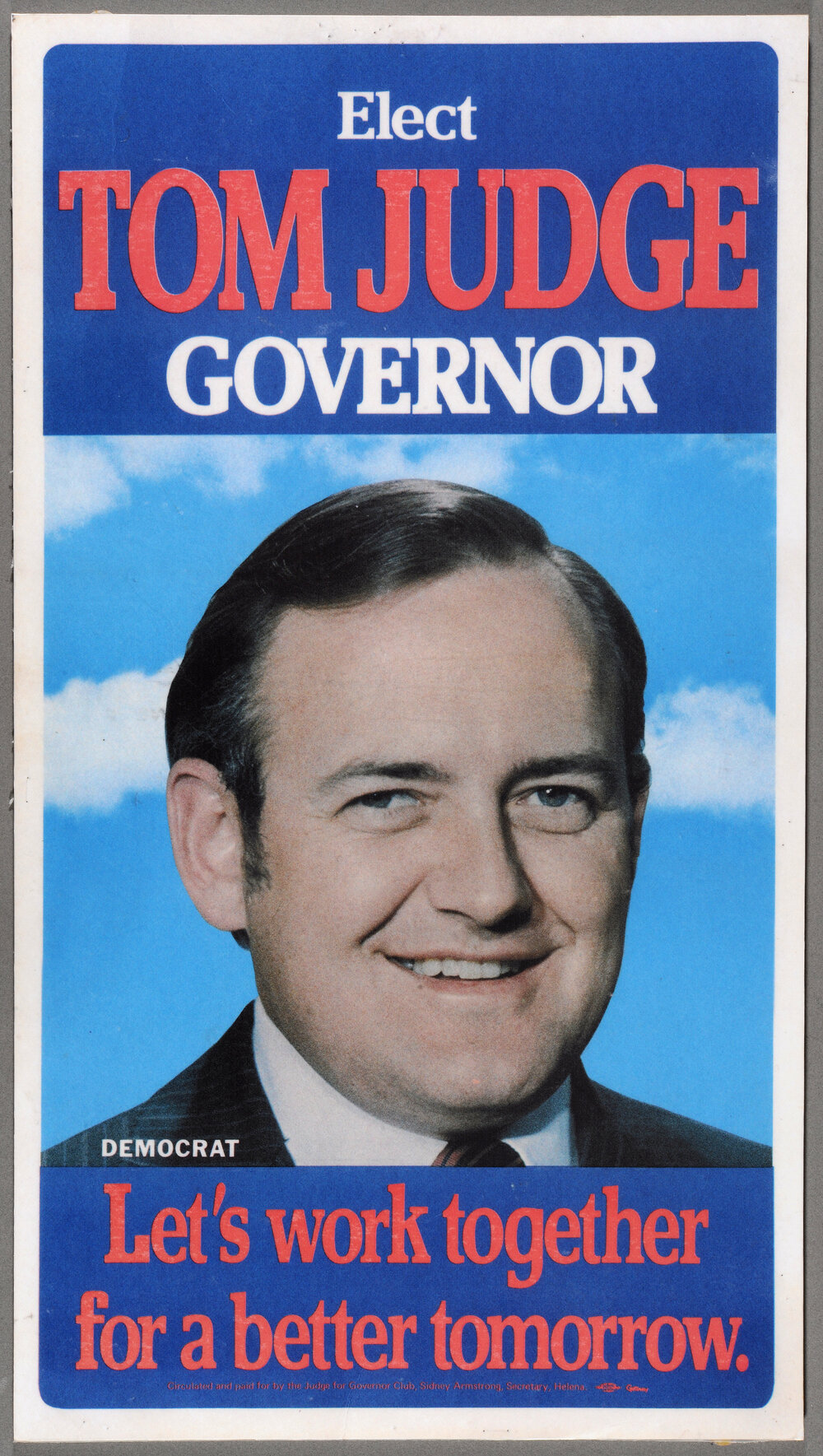
1972 campaign poster

Judge was a second lieutenant in the US Army and a captain in the US Army Adjutant General Corps and in the US Army Reserves from 1958 to 1964. In 1960, he became president and owner of a public relations firm.

Judge served in the Montana House of Representatives from 1961 to 1967 and in the Montana Senate from 1967 to 1969, and as 22nd Lieutenant Governor of Montana from 1969 to 1973.

In 1972, when incumbent Governor of Montana Forrest Anderson declined to run for a second term, Judge ran to succeed him. He defeated several opponents in the Democratic primary, and advanced to the general election, where he comfortably defeated Republican nominee Ed Smith, a rancher and legislator from Dagmar, Montana. Judge was 38 years old at the time of his election as governor.

When Judge ran for re-election in 1976, he was opposed by State Attorney General Bob Woodahl, whom he defeated in a landslide. He ran for re-election for a third consecutive term in 1980, but was defeated in the Democratic primary by his lieutenant governor, Ted Schwinden, who went on to win the general election. During his tenure as governor, Judge served on the executive committee of the National Governors Association and was chair of the Western Governors Conference.

When Schwinden declined to seek re-election to a third term in 1988, Judge ran to succeed him, and won a competitive and crowded Democratic primary. In the general election, Stan Stephens, the former President of the Montana Senate and the Republican nominee, defeated Judge by a slim margin.

== Death ==
Judge died in Chandler, Arizona, on September 8, 2006, at the age of 71. He is interred at Resurrection Cemetery in Helena, Montana.

Party political offices
Preceded by ???	Democratic nominee for Lieutenant Governor of Montana; 1968	Succeeded by Bill Christiansen
Preceded by Forrest Anderson	Democratic nominee for Governor of Montana; 1972, 1976	Succeeded by Ted Schwinden
Preceded by Ted Schwinden	Democratic nominee for Governor of Montana; 1988	Succeeded by Dorothy Bradley
Political offices
Preceded by Ted James	Lieutenant Governor of Montana; January 6, 1969 – January 1, 1973	Succeeded by Bill Christiansen
Preceded by Forrest Anderson	Governor of Montana; January 1, 1973 – January 5, 1981	Succeeded by Ted Schwinden
