= George Turman =

American politician

24th Lieutenant Governor of Montana
- In office January 5, 1981 – January 4, 1988
- Governor: Ted Schwinden
- Preceded by: Ted Schwinden
- Succeeded by: Gordon McOmber

Personal details
- Born: George Fugett Turman; June 25, 1928 Missoula, Montana, U.S.
- Died: December 9, 2008 (aged 80) Missoula, Montana, U.S.
- Party: Democratic 1980-2008
- Other political affiliations: Republican 1949-1980

George Fugett Turman (June 25, 1928 – December 9, 2008) was the 24th Lieutenant Governor of Montana. Originally a Republican state legislator before becoming a Democrat, he was elected to the position in 1980 on a ticket with fellow Democrat Ted Schwinden. They were re-elected in 1984. Turman relinquished the position in 1988. He died of natural causes on December 9, 2008, in Missoula, Montana, aged 80.

Political offices
Preceded by Ted Schwinden	Lieutenant Governor of Montana; 1981–1988	Succeeded by Gordon McOmber
