= Ted Schwinden =

American politician (1925–2023)

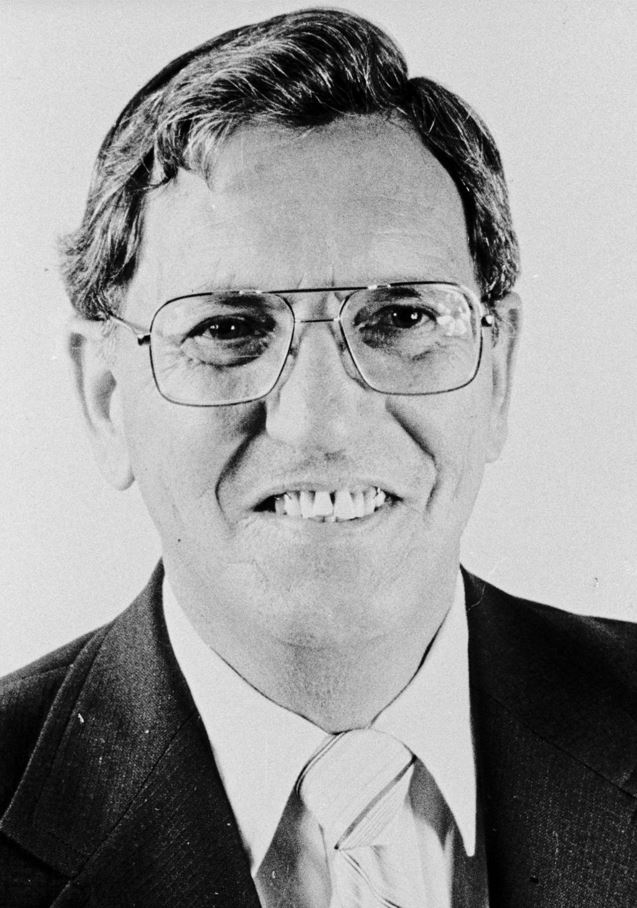

19th Governor of Montana
- In office January 5, 1981 – January 2, 1989
- Lieutenant: George Turman; Gordon McOmber
- Preceded by: Tom Judge
- Succeeded by: Stan Stephens

26th Lieutenant Governor of Montana
- In office January 3, 1977 – January 5, 1981
- Governor: Tom Judge
- Preceded by: Bill Christiansen
- Succeeded by: George Turman

Personal details
- Born: Theodore Schwinden; August 31, 1925 Roosevelt County, Montana, U.S.
- Died: October 7, 2023 (aged 98) Phoenix, Arizona, U.S.
- Party: Democratic
- Spouse: Jean Christianson (m. 1946; died 2007)
- Children: 3
- Education: University of Montana (BA, MA); University of Minnesota

Military service
- Branch/service: United States Army
- Years of service: 1944–1946
- Battles/wars: World War II

Theodore Schwinden (August 31, 1925 – October 7, 2023) was an American politician from Montana. He was the 19th governor of Montana from 1981 to 1989. He had previously served as the 26th lieutenant governor of Montana and as a member of the Montana House of Representatives.

== Biography ==
Theodore Schwinden was born in Roosevelt County, Montana, on his family's farm on the Fort Peck Indian Reservation between Wolf Point and Poplar. Schwinden was a valedictorian at his high school. He enlisted in the United States Army and served in both the European and Pacific theaters in World War II. He left the army in 1946. He earned a bachelor's and master's from the University of Montana. He was studying toward a PhD in economics at the University of Minnesota before he had to return to his family farm due to his father's ill health.

== Career ==
A member of the Democratic Party, Schwinden was elected to the Montana House of Representatives in 1958, defeating Republican incumbent Chris S. Tange to represent Roosevelt County. Schwinden completed two terms in the House but was unsuccessful in his campaign for a third term. He was elected and named to the Legislative Council in 1959. He served as the House minority whip in 1961. In 1965, he was elected president of the Grain Growers Association. In 1969, he was named Commissioner of State Lands by governor Forrest H. Anderson. He was reappointed in 1973 and served until April 1976. Schwinden resigned to campaign for lieutenant governor and was elected the 23rd lieutenant governor of Montana, serving under Governor Thomas Lee Judge. He served as lieutenant governor from 1977 to 1981.

Schwinden defeated Judge in the Democratic primary in 1980. He then beat Republican Jack Ramirez in that year's gubernatorial election to become the 19th governor of Montana. He was re-elected governor in 1984, getting the victory over State Senator Pat M. Goodover. Hallmarks of Schwinden's governorship were his "Build Montana" economic plan and popular traveling "Capital for a Day" events, and was known for leading Montana through its economic difficulties. He took pride in being what he felt was a governor who maintained an open and attentive approach to the needs and concerns of the public. Despite favorable polling in 1988, he chose not to seek a third term as governor, staying true to his promise of serving only two terms in office.

== Personal life and death ==
Schwinden married the former Jean Christianson in 1946. Schwinden and his wife had two sons, Mike Schwinden and Dore Schwinden, and one daughter, Chrys Anderson. Jean Schwinden died from cancer on March 24, 2007, at age 81.

In his later years, Schwinden lived with his daughter in Phoenix, Arizona. He died in Phoenix on October 7, 2023, at the age of 98.

Political offices
Preceded by Bill Christiansen	Lieutenant Governor of Montana; 1977–1981	Succeeded by George Turman
Preceded by Tom Judge	Governor of Montana; 1981–1989	Succeeded by Stan Stephens
Party political offices
Preceded by Tom Judge	Democratic nominee for Governor of Montana; 1980, 1984	Succeeded by Tom Judge
