= 1972 Montana gubernatorial election =

- November 7, 1972
- Turnout: 84.60%▼1.80
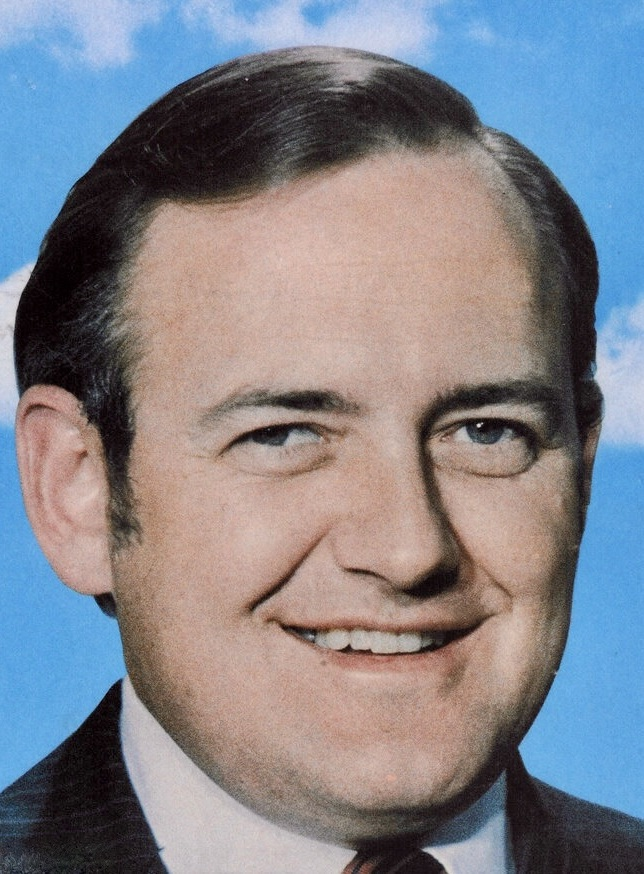

Nominee	Thomas Lee Judge	Ed Smith
Party	Democratic	Republican
Popular vote	172,523	146,231
Percentage	54.12%	45.88%
- County results Anderson: 50–60% 60–70% 70–80% Smith: 50–60% 60–70% 70–80% 80–90%
Governor before election
Forrest H. Anderson
Democratic
Elected Governor
Thomas Lee Judge
Democratic

The 1972 Montana gubernatorial election took place on November 7, 1972. Incumbent Governor of Montana Forrest H. Anderson, who was first elected in 1968, declined to seek re-election. Thomas Lee Judge, the lieutenant governor of Montana, won a competitive Democratic primary, and moved on to the general election, where he faced Ed Smith, a rancher and the Republican nominee. Although President Richard Nixon won the state in a landslide in that year's presidential election, Judge managed to handily defeat Smith, winning his first of two terms as governor.

== Democratic primary ==
=== Candidates ===
- David E. Burnham
- Dick Dzivi, majority leader of the Montana Senate
- Dallas E. Howard
- Thomas Lee Judge, lieutenant governor of Montana
- Eva Levengood Shunkwiler

=== Results ===
Democratic Party primary results
Party	Candidate	Votes	%
Democratic	Thomas Lee Judge	75,917	59.87
Democratic	Dick Dzivi	38,639	30.47
Democratic	Eva Levengood Shunkwiler	5,707	4.50
Democratic	Dallas E. Howard	4,255	3.36
Democratic	David E. Burnham	2,276	1.80
Total votes		126,794	100.00

== Republican primary ==
=== Candidates ===
- Frank Dunkle, former director of the Montana Department of Fish, Wildlife and Parks, former state senator
- Warren McMillan
- Tom A. Selstad, businessman
- Ed Smith, rancher

=== Results ===
Republican primary results
Party	Candidate	Votes	%
Republican	Ed Smith	39,552	40.65
Republican	Frank Dunkle	37,375	38.41
Republican	Tom A. Selstad	18,046	18.55
Republican	Warren McMillan	2,331	2.40
Total votes		97,304	100.00

== General election ==
=== Results ===
Montana gubernatorial election, 1972
Party	Candidate	Votes	%	±%
Democratic	Thomas Lee Judge	172,523	54.12%	+7.58%
Republican	Ed Smith	146,231	45.88%	+4.01%
Majority		26,292	8.25%	−3.99%
Turnout		318,754		
Democratic hold		Swing		
