= 1954 United States Senate election in Montana =

- November 2, 1954
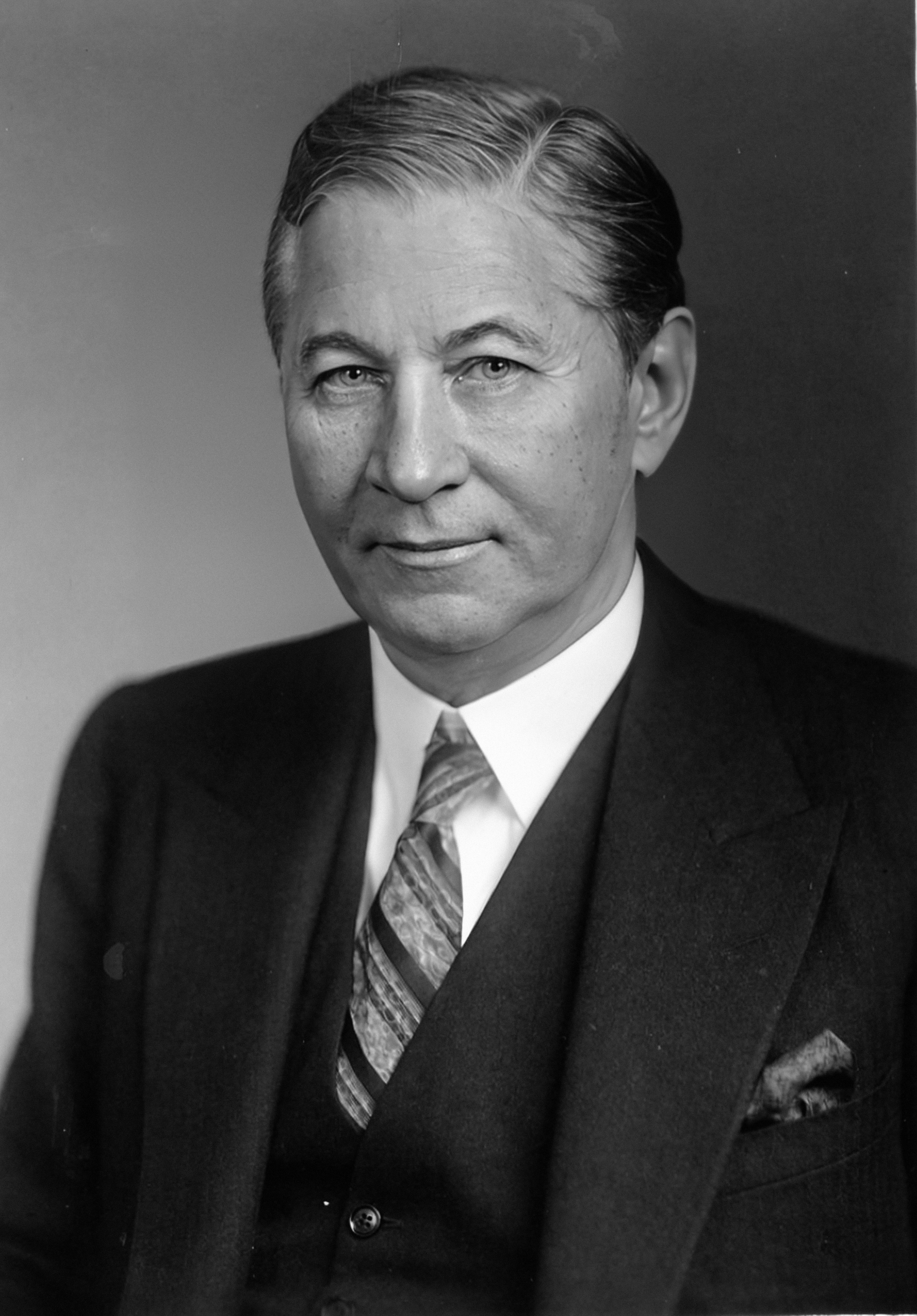

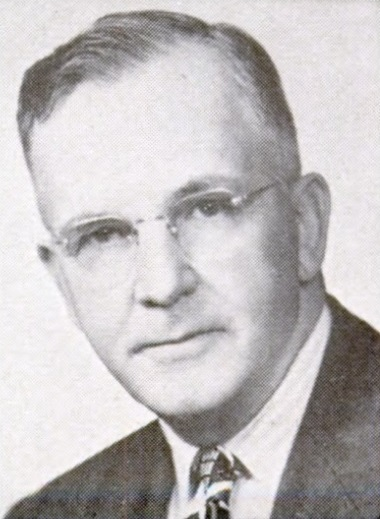
Nominee	James E. Murray	Wesley A. D'Ewart
Party	Democratic	Republican
Popular vote	114,591	112,863
Percentage	50.38%	49.62%
- County results Murray: 50–60% 60–70% D'Ewart: 50–60% 60–70% 70–80%
U.S. senator before election
James E. Murray
Democratic
Elected U.S. Senator
James E. Murray
Democratic

The 1954 United States Senate election in Montana took place on November 2, 1954. Incumbent United States Senator James E. Murray, who was first elected to the Senate in a special election in 1934 and was re-elected in 1936, 1942, and 1948, ran for re-election. After winning the Democratic primary against trivial opponents, he advanced to the general election, where he was opposed by Wesley A. D'Ewart, the Republican nominee and the United States Congressman from Montana's 2nd congressional district. A contentious and close election ensued, but ultimately, Murray was able to narrowly win re-election over D'Ewart to a final term in the Senate.

== Democratic primary ==
=== Candidates ===
- James Edward Murray, incumbent United States Senator
- Ray E. Gulick, farmer
- Sam G. Feezell

=== Results ===
Democratic Party primary results
Party	Candidate	Votes	%
Democratic	James E. Murray (incumbent)	65,896	86.94%
Democratic	Ray E. Gulick	4,961	6.55%
Democratic	Sam G. Feezell	4,941	6.52%
Total votes		75,798	100.00%

== Republican primary ==
=== Candidates ===
- Wesley A. D'Ewart, United States Congressman from Montana's 2nd congressional district
- Robert Yellowtail, former Superintendent of the Crow Indian Reservation

=== Results ===
Republican Primary results
Party	Candidate	Votes	%
Republican	Wesley A. D'Ewart	49,964	82.36%
Republican	Robert Yellowtail	10,705	17.64%
Total votes		60,669	100.00%

== General election ==
=== Results ===
United States Senate election in Montana, 1954
Party	Candidate	Votes	%	±%
Democratic	James E. Murray (incumbent)	114,591	50.38%	−6.27%
Republican	Wesley A. D'Ewart	112,863	49.62%	+6.88%
Majority		1,728	0.76%	−13.15%
Turnout		227,454		
Democratic hold		Swing		
