= 1948 United States Senate election in Montana =

- November 2, 1948
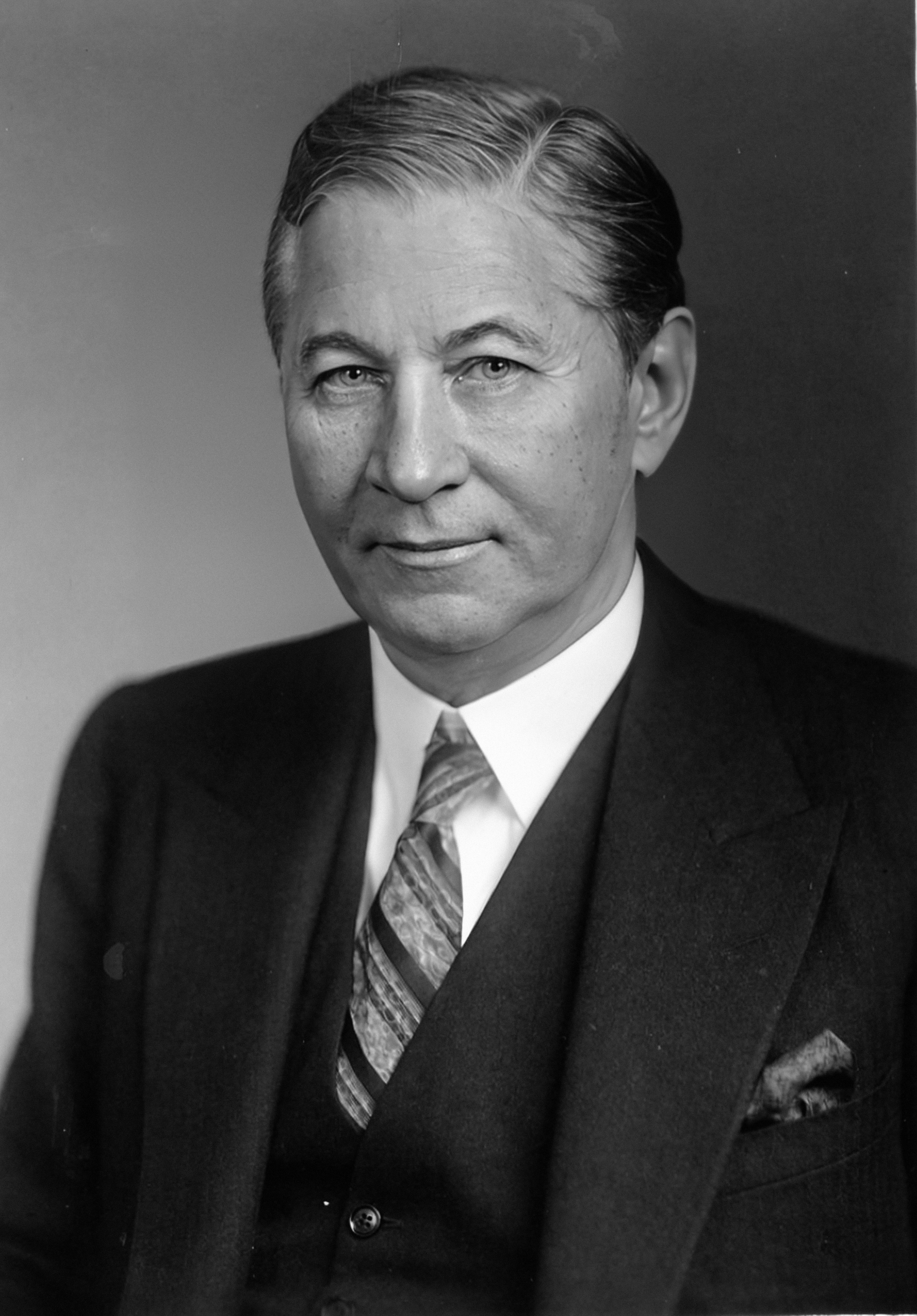

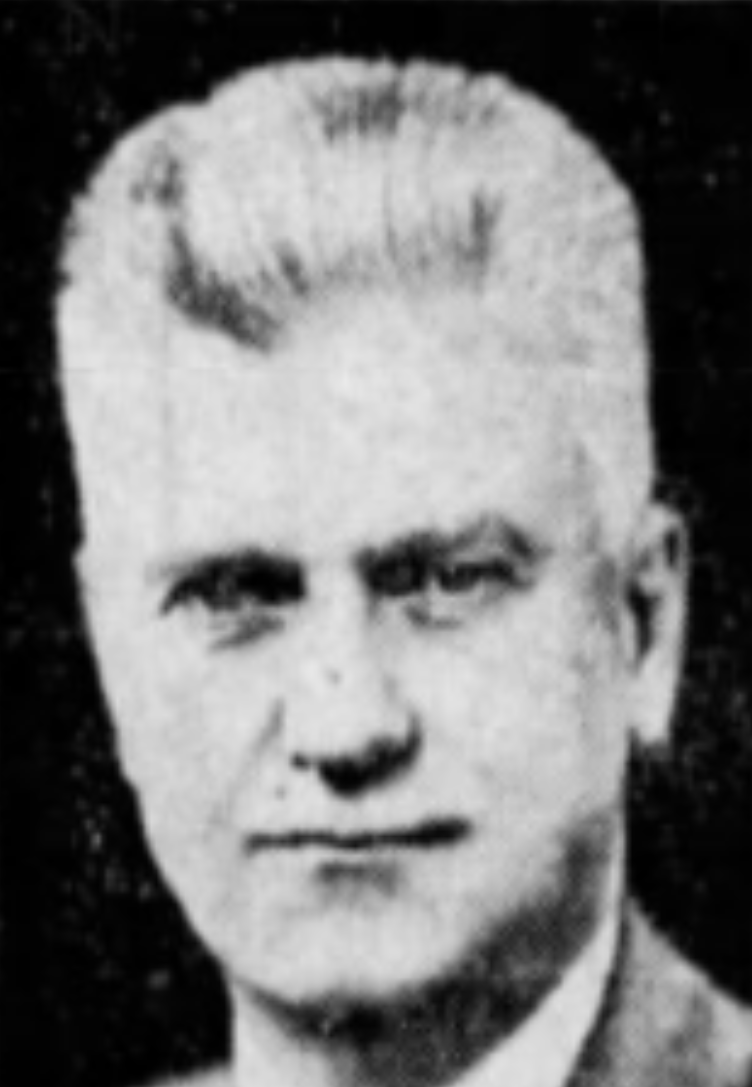
Nominee	James E. Murray	Tom J. Davis
Party	Democratic	Republican
Popular vote	125,193	94,458
Percentage	56.65%	42.74%
- County results Murray: 50–60% 60–70% Davis: 50–60% 60–70%
U.S. senator before election
James E. Murray
Democratic
Elected U.S. Senator
James E. Murray
Democratic

The 1948 United States Senate election in Montana took place on November 2, 1948. Incumbent United States Senator James E. Murray, who was first elected to the Senate in a special election in 1934 and was re-elected in 1936 and 1942, ran for re-election. After winning the Democratic primary, he faced Tom J. Davis, an attorney and the Republican nominee, in the general election. Following a narrow re-election in 1936, Murray significantly expanded his margin of victory and comfortably won re-election over Davis, resulting in him winning his fourth term and his third full term in the Senate.

== Democratic primary ==
=== Candidates ===
- James E. Murray, incumbent United States Senator
- Harry J. McGregor

=== Results ===
Democratic Party primary results
Party	Candidate	Votes	%
Democratic	James E. Murray (incumbent)	62,658	81.63%
Democratic	Harry J. McGregor	14,104	18.37%
Total votes		76,762	100.00%

== Republican primary ==
=== Candidates ===
- Tom J. Davis, attorney, former President of Rotary International
- Wellington D. Rankin, former United States Attorney for the District of Montana, former Attorney General of Montana

=== Results ===
Republican Primary results
Party	Candidate	Votes	%
Republican	Tom J. Davis	31,897	55.98%
Republican	Wellington D. Rankin	25,083	44.02%
Total votes		56,980	100.00%

== General election ==
=== Results ===
United States Senate election in Montana, 1948
Party	Candidate	Votes	%	±%
Democratic	James E. Murray (incumbent)	125,193	56.65%	+7.58%
Republican	Tom S. Davis	94,458	42.74%	−5.62%
Prohibition	C. S. Hanna	1,352	0.61%	
Majority		30,735	13.91%	+13.20%
Turnout		221,003		
Democratic hold		Swing		

== See also ==
- United States Senate elections, 1948 and 1949
