= Scott Leavitt =

American politician (1879–1966)

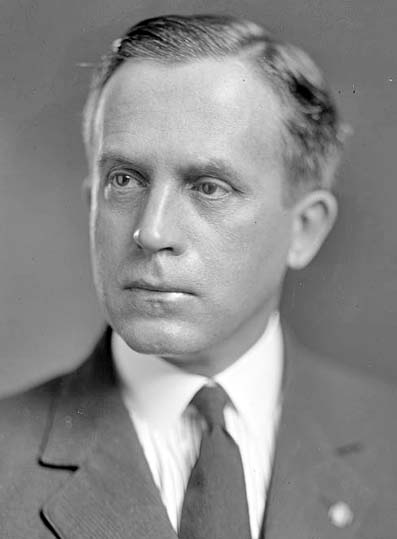

Member of the U.S. House of Representatives from Montana's 2nd district
- In office March 4, 1923 – March 3, 1933
- Preceded by: Carl W. Riddick
- Succeeded by: Roy E. Ayers

Personal details
- Born: June 16, 1879 Elk Rapids, Michigan, U.S.
- Died: October 19, 1966 (aged 87) Newberg, Oregon, U.S.
- Party: Republican
- Education: University of Michigan
- Profession: school principal, Forest Service ranger

Military service
- Allegiance: United States of America
- Branch/service: United States Army
- Years of service: 1898
- Rank: Corporal
- Unit: 33rd Michigan Volunteer Infantry
- Battles/wars: Spanish–American War

Scott Leavitt (June 16, 1879 – October 19, 1966) was a U.S. representative from Montana. He served as chairman of the House Committee on Indian Affairs.

== Early life ==
Scott Leavitt was born in Elk Rapids, Michigan in 1879 to Roswell Leavitt, an attorney, member of the Maine House of Representatives and later Michigan State Senator, a native of Turner, Maine, where he enlisted in the 17th Maine Volunteer Infantry Regiment, and his wife Anna C. (Lawrence) Leavitt. Scott Leavitt moved with his parents in 1881 to Bellaire, Michigan, where his father Roswell served as prosecuting attorney and circuit court commissioner.

Scott Leavitt attended the public schools and while in high school enlisted in the Thirty-third Regiment, Michigan Volunteer Infantry, during the Spanish–American War. Leavitt served in the campaign at Santiago, Cuba during the war. After the war he attended the University of Michigan at Ann Arbor. He subsequently moved to Oregon in 1901 and began homesteading in the Coast Range Mountains near Falls City. There he worked as a school principal in the communities of Falls City, North Yamhill, Dayton, and Lakeview, Oregon from 1901 to 1907. In 1907 Leavitt entered the United States Forest Service as a ranger at the Fremont National Forest in Oregon. He later served in Minnesota and Montana until 1917.

== Politics ==
In 1922, when incumbent United States Congressman Carl W. Riddick opted to run for the Senate rather than seek re-election to the United States House of Representatives, Leavitt ran to succeed him in Montana's 2nd congressional district. He defeated Preston B. Moss, the Democratic nominee, by a wide margin to win his first term, and in 1924, defeated Joseph Kirschwing by a landslide to win his second term. Leavitt was re-elected in 1926 against Harry B. Mitchell, was overwhelmingly re-elected in 1928 over B. A. Taylor, and won what would be his fifth and final term in Congress in 1930 over Tom Stout.

On March 5, 1932, Leavitt took to the floor of the House to deliver a eulogy to Indian Chief Plenty Coups. "I have chosen to announce the passing of one who has graced the history of my state of Montana," said Leavitt on the floor of the U.S. House of Representatives.

[Plenty Coup's] life was in truth a symbol of the absorption of the American Indian into the citizenship of the United States," Leavitt continued. "His was one of the finest characters I have ever known.... He was a man of such caliber and such high character, and his service was so outstanding, that it is entirely fitting that the American Congress should pause for a moment to do him reverence.

Leavitt ran for re-election in 1932, but was defeated by Roy E. Ayers in a Democratic landslide year that saw Republicans lose over a hundred seats in the United States House of Representatives. From the 69th United States Congress to the 71st United States Congress, Leavitt served as the Chairman of the House Committee on Indian Affairs.

Following his defeat for re-election, Leavitt ran for the United States Senate in a 1934 special election to fill the seat of Thomas J. Walsh, who died in office. He won the Republican primary against former State Attorney General Wellington D. Rankin, but lost the general election to James E. Murray in a landslide. After his unsuccessful campaign for the Senate, he started working for the Forest Service again in Milwaukee, Wisconsin, and served as the Commander-in-Chief of the United Spanish War Veterans from 1936 to 1937.

== Later life ==
He retired from the Forest Service in 1941 and moved to Newberg, Oregon, where Scott Leavitt died on October 19, 1966. He was interred in Willamette National Cemetery near Portland, Oregon. Scott Leavitt Park in Newberg is named for the Congressman and Forest Ranger.

Party political offices
Preceded by Albert J. Galen	Republican nominee for U.S. Senator from Montana (Class 2); 1934	Succeeded by Thomas Larson
U.S. House of Representatives
Preceded by Carl W. Riddick	United States Representative for the 2nd congressional district of Montana; 1923–1933	Succeeded by Roy E. Ayers
