= 1932 Montana gubernatorial election =

- November 8, 1932
- Turnout: 81.60%▲0.80
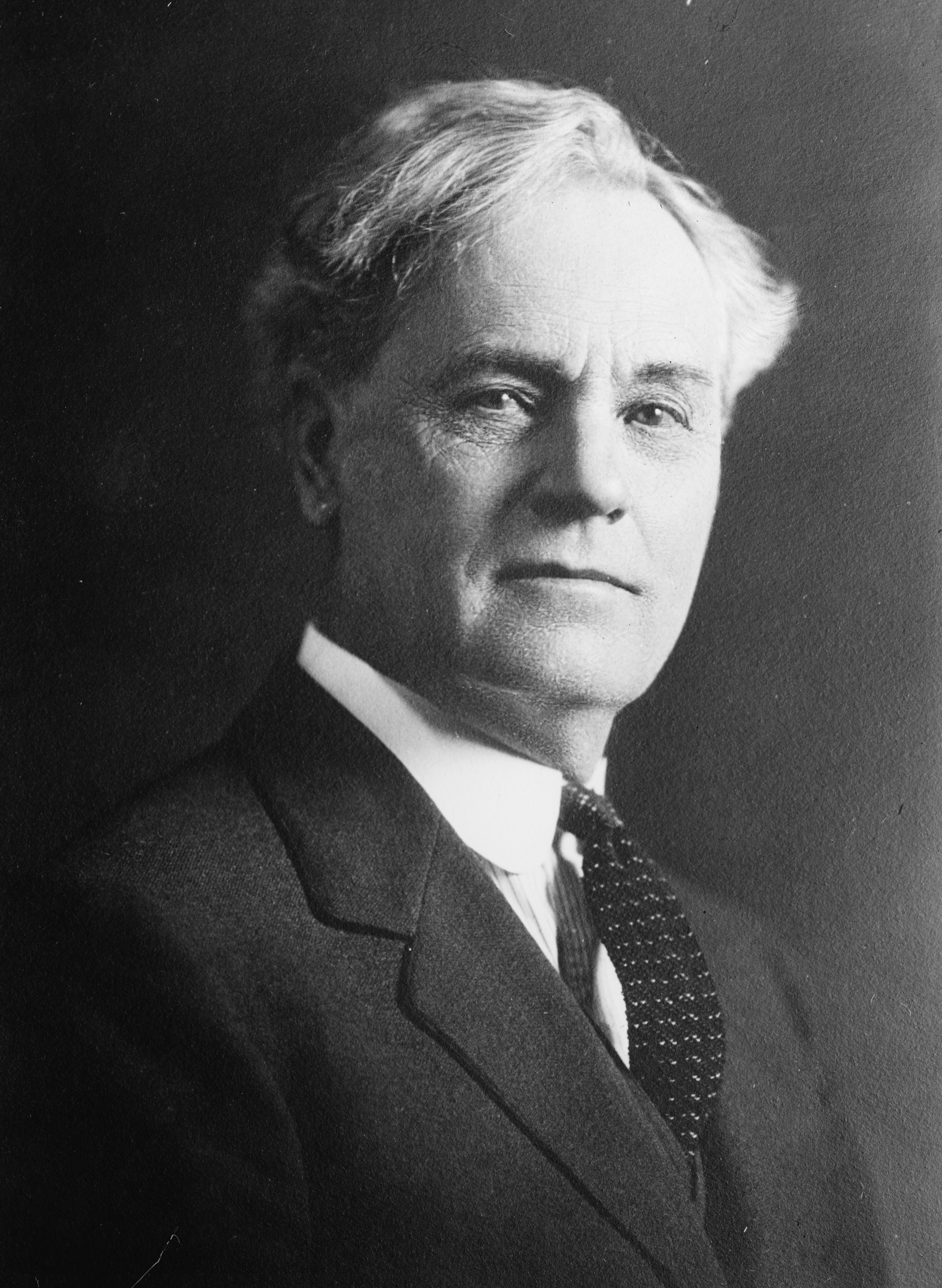

Nominee	John E. Erickson	Frank A. Hazelbaker
Party	Democratic	Republican
Popular vote	104,949	101,105
Percentage	48.50%	46.73%
- County results Erickson: 40–50% 50–60% 60–70% Hazelbaker: 30–40% 40–50% 50–60% 60–70%
Governor before election
John E. Erickson
Democratic
Elected Governor
John E. Erickson
Democratic

The 1932 Montana gubernatorial election took place on November 8, 1932. Incumbent Governor of Montana John E. Erickson, who was first elected governor in 1924 and was re-elected in 1928, ran for re-election. He won the Democratic primary with a plurality and advanced to the general election, where he faced Frank A. Hazelbaker, the Lieutenant Governor of Montana. Despite the fact that Franklin D. Roosevelt carried the state in a landslide in the presidential election that year, Erickson only narrowly defeated Hazelbaker to win re-election to his third and final term as governor, though he would later resign just a few months into his term to appoint himself to the United States Senate.

== Democratic primary ==
=== Candidates ===
- John E. Erickson, incumbent Governor of Montana
- Lewis Penwell, Collector of Internal Revenue for the District of Montana, former State Representative
- Miles Romney Sr., former State Senator, former Mayor of Hamilton
- Henry B. Mitchell

=== Results ===
Democratic Party primary results
Party	Candidate	Votes	%
Democratic	John E. Erickson (incumbent)	34,370	45.52
Democratic	Lewis Penwell	16,093	21.32
Democratic	Miles Romney, Sr.	15,727	20.83
Democratic	Henry B. Mitchell	9,307	12.33
Total votes		75,497	100.00

== Republican primary ==
=== Candidates ===
- Frank A. Hazelbaker, Lieutenant Governor of Montana
- W. S. McCormack, former President of the Montana Senate

=== Results ===
Republican Primary results
Party	Candidate	Votes	%
Republican	Frank A. Hazelbaker	48,658	68.98
Republican	W. S. McCormack	21,883	31.02
Total votes		70,541	100.00

== General election ==
=== Results ===
Montana gubernatorial election, 1932
Party	Candidate	Votes	%	±%
Democratic	John E. Erickson (incumbent)	104,949	48.50%	−10.01%
Republican	Frank A. Hazelbaker	101,105	46.73%	+5.64%
Socialist	Christian Yegan	6,317	2.92%	+2.52%
Communist	Rodney Salisbury	2,008	0.93%	
Liberty	William R. Duncan	2,002	0.93%	
Majority		3,844	1.78%	−15.66%
Turnout		216,381		
Democratic hold		Swing		
