= 1920 Montana gubernatorial election =

- November 2, 1920
- Turnout: 68.50%
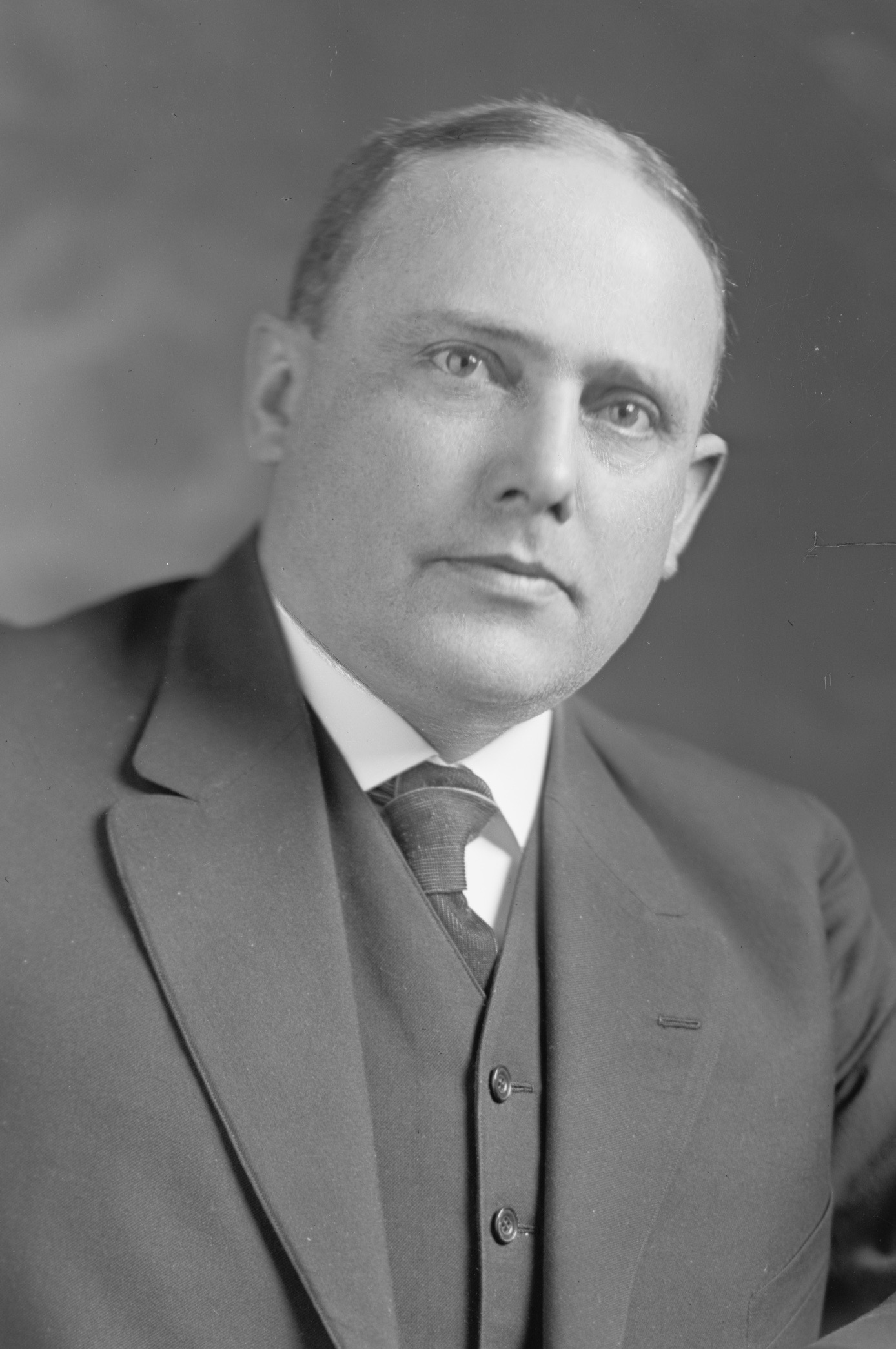

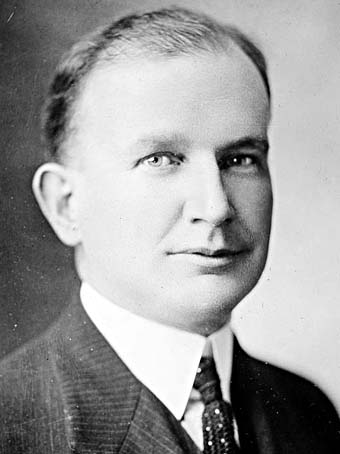
Nominee	Joseph M. Dixon	Burton K. Wheeler
Party	Republican	Democratic
Popular vote	111,113	74,875
Percentage	59.74%	40.26%
- County results Dixon: 50–60% 60–70% 70–80% 80–90% Wheeler: 50–60% 60–70%
Governor before election
Sam V. Stewart
Democratic
Elected Governor
Joseph M. Dixon
Republican

The 1920 Montana gubernatorial election took place on November 2, 1920. Incumbent Governor of Montana Sam V. Stewart, who was first elected Governor in 1912 and 1916, declined to run for re-election. To replace him, former United States Senator Joseph M. Dixon won the Republican primary, which was closely contested. In the general election, he faced Burton K. Wheeler, the former United States Attorney for the District of Montana and the Democratic nominee. Ultimately, Dixon defeated Wheeler by a wide margin to win his first and only term as governor.

== Democratic primary ==
=== Candidates ===
- Burton K. Wheeler, former United States Attorney for the District of Montana and State Representative
- W. W. McDowell, Lieutenant Governor of Montana
- Thomas E. Cary

=== Results ===
Democratic Party primary results
Party	Candidate	Votes	%
Democratic	Burton K. Wheeler	35,228	61.33
Democratic	W. W. McDowell	17,798	30.98
Democratic	Thomas E. Cary	4,418	7.69
Total votes		57,444	100.00

== Republican primary ==
=== Candidates ===
- Joseph M. Dixon, former United States Senator
- Henry L. Wilson
- Sam C. Ford, Attorney General of Montana
- Robert Lee Clinton
- Daniel W. Slayton, rancher
- Ronald Higgins

=== Results ===
Republican Primary results
Party	Candidate	Votes	%
Republican	Joseph M. Dixon	18,718	35.41
Republican	Henry L. Wilson	15,765	29.82
Republican	Sam C. Ford	12,271	23.21
Republican	Robert Lee Clinton	2,604	4.93
Republican	Daniel W. Slayton	2,029	3.84
Republican	Ronald Higgins	1,481	2.80
Total votes		52,868	100.00

== General election ==
=== Results ===
Montana gubernatorial election, 1920
Party	Candidate	Votes	%	±%
Republican	Joseph M. Dixon	111,113	59.74%	+15.64%
Democratic	Burton K. Wheeler	74,875	40.26%	−9.11%
Majority		36,238	19.48%	+14.22%
Turnout		185,988		
Republican gain from Democratic		Swing		
