= 1942 United States Senate election in Montana =

- November 3, 1942
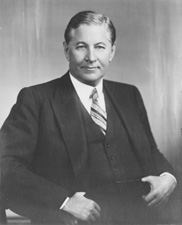

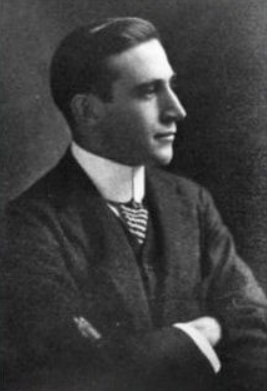
Nominee	James E. Murray	Wellington D. Rankin
Party	Democratic	Republican
Popular vote	83,673	82,461
Percentage	49.07%	48.36%
- County results Murray: 40–50% 50–60% Rankin: 40–50% 50–60% 60–70% 70–80%
U.S. senator before election
James E. Murray
Democratic
Elected U.S. Senator
James E. Murray
Democratic

The 1942 United States Senate election in Montana took place on November 3, 1942. Incumbent United States Senator James E. Murray, who was first elected to the Senate in a special election in 1934 and was re-elected in 1936, ran for re-election. Following his victory in a competitive Democratic primary, Murray advanced to the general election, where he was opposed by former United States Attorney for the District of Montana Wellington D. Rankin, the Republican nominee and brother of representative Jeannette Rankin. In a closely fought election, Murray narrowly defeated Rankin to win re-election to his third term and his second full term in the Senate.

== Democratic primary ==
=== Candidates ===
- James E. Murray, incumbent United States Senator
- Joseph P. Monaghan, former United States Congressman from Montana's 1st congressional district, 1936 independent candidate for the United States Senate

=== Results ===
Democratic Party primary results
Party	Candidate	Votes	%
Democratic	James E. Murray (incumbent)	47,826	62.49%
Democratic	Joseph P. Monaghan	28,709	37.51%
Total votes		76,535	100.00%

== Republican primary ==
=== Candidates ===
- Wellington D. Rankin, former United States Attorney for the District of Montana, former Attorney General of Montana
- Charles R. Dawley, United States Army veteran
- Jacob Thorkelson, former United States Congressman from Montana's 1st congressional district

=== Results ===
Republican Primary results
Party	Candidate	Votes	%
Republican	Wellington D. Rankin	24,677	58.83%
Republican	Charles R. Dawley	9,267	22.09%
Republican	Jacob Thorkelson	7,999	19.07%
Total votes		41,943	100.00%

== General election ==
=== Results ===
United States Senate election in Montana, 1942
Party	Candidate	Votes	%	±%
Democratic	James E. Murray (incumbent)	83,673	49.07%	−5.91%
Republican	Wellington D. Rankin	82,461	48.36%	+21.25%
Prohibition	Charles R. Miller	2,711	1.59%	
Socialist	E. H. Helterbran	1,669	0.98%	
Majority		1,212	0.71%	−27.16%
Turnout		170,514		
Democratic hold		Swing		
