= 1912 Montana gubernatorial election =

- November 5, 1912
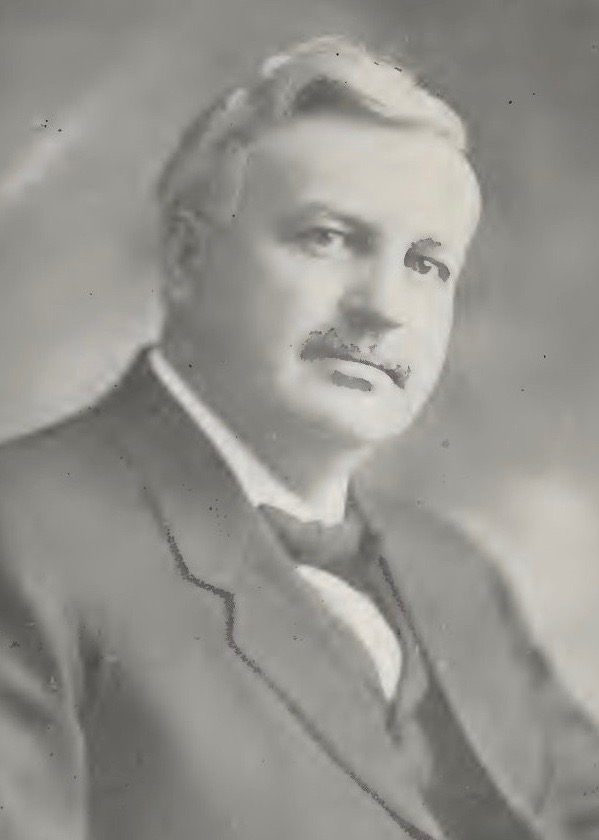

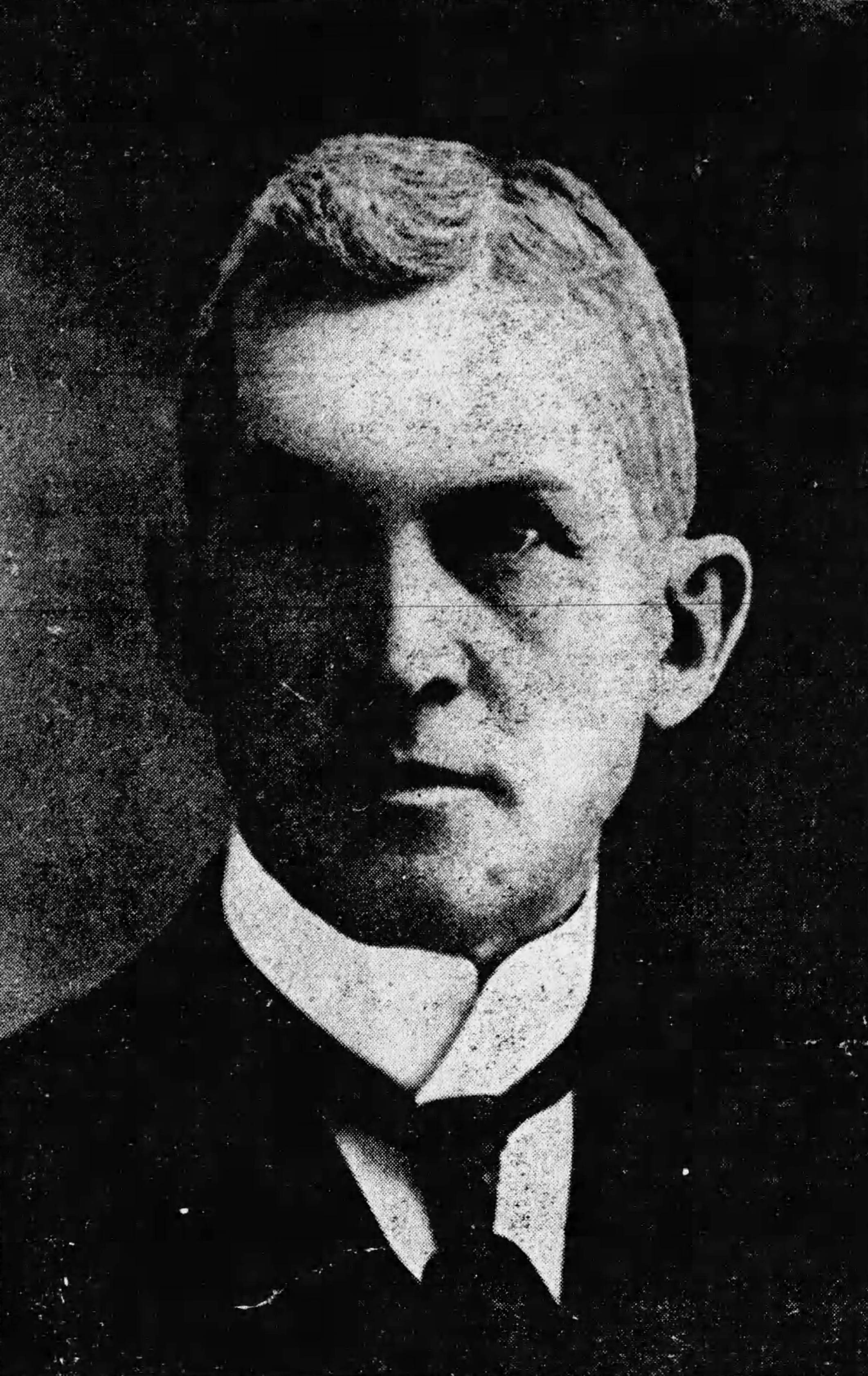

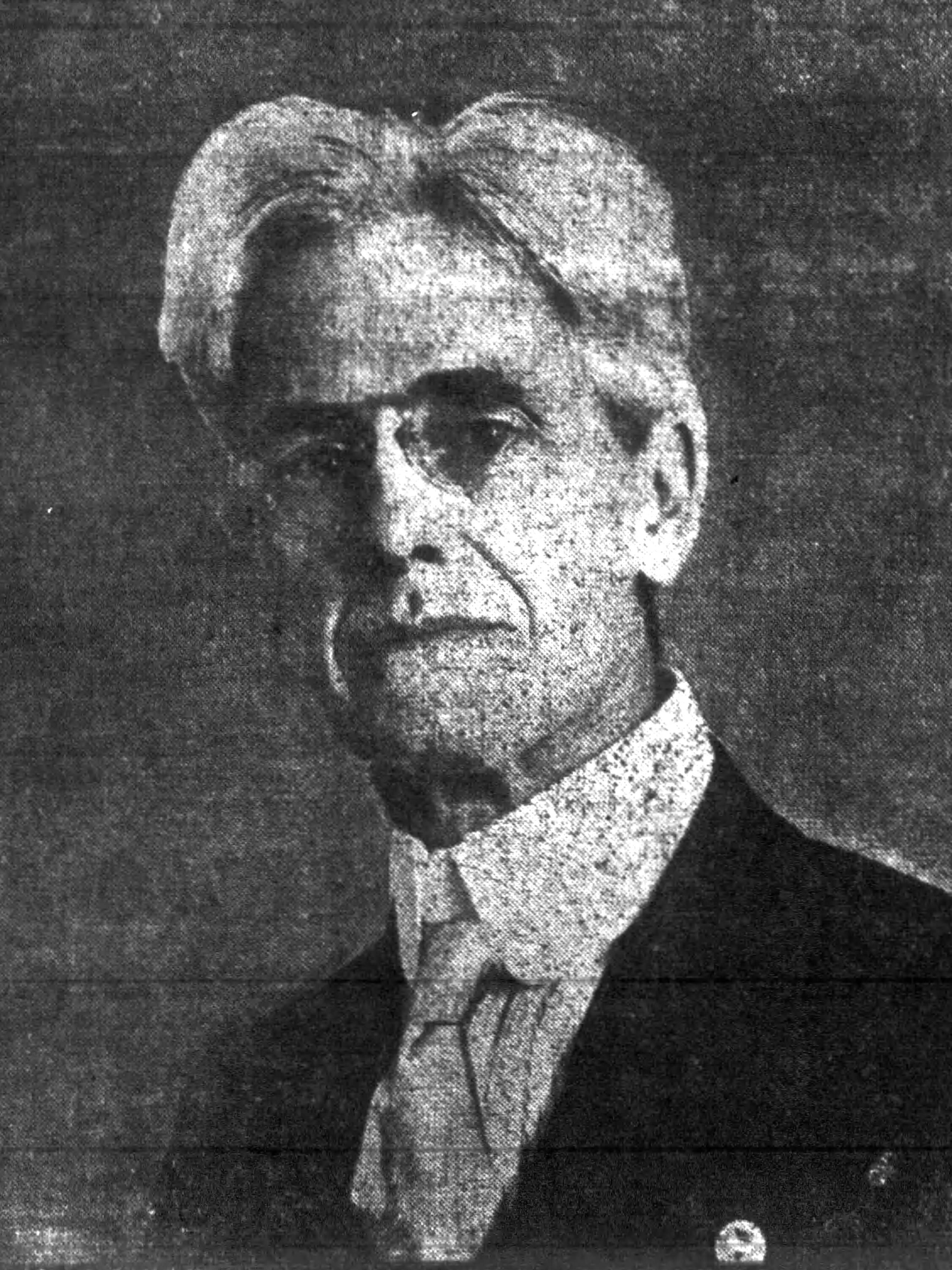
Nominee	Sam V. Stewart	Harry L. Wilson
Party	Democratic	Republican
Popular vote	25,381	22,950
Percentage	31.81%	28.77%
Nominee	Frank J. Edwards	Lewis Johnstone Duncan
Party	Progressive	Socialist
Popular vote	18,881	12,566
Percentage	23.67%	15.75%
- County results Stewart: 30–40% 40–50% 50–60% Wilson: 30–40% 40–50% Edwards: 30–40% 40–50%
Governor before election
Edwin L. Norris
Democratic
Elected Governor
Sam V. Stewart
Democratic

The 1912 Montana gubernatorial election was held on November 5, 1912.

Democratic nominee Sam V. Stewart defeated Republican nominee Harry L. Wilson, Progressive nominee Frank J. Edwards and Socialist nominee Lewis Johnstone Duncan with 31.81% of the vote.

== General election ==
=== Candidates ===
- Sam V. Stewart, Democratic, lawyer, former chairman of the Democratic State Central Committee
- Harry L. Wilson, Republican, lawyer
- Frank J. Edwards, Progressive, former mayor of Helena
- Lewis Johnstone Duncan, Socialist, Mayor of Butte, candidate for Montana's at-large congressional district in 1908

=== Results ===
1912 Montana gubernatorial election
Party	Candidate	Votes	%	±%
Democratic	Sam V. Stewart	25,381	31.81%	
Republican	Harry L. Wilson	22,950	28.77%	
Progressive	Frank J. Edwards	18,881	23.67%	
Socialist	Lewis Johnstone Duncan	12,566	15.75%	
Majority		2,431	3.04%	
Turnout		79,778		
Democratic hold		Swing		

== Bibliography ==
- Glashan, Roy R. (1979). American Governors and Gubernatorial Elections, 1775-1978. Meckler Books. ISBN 0-930466-17-9.
- Dubin, Michael J. (2013). United States Gubernatorial Elections, 1912-1931. Jefferson, NC: McFarland & Co. ISBN 978-0-7864-7033-4.
