= Sam V. Stewart =

American judge (1872–1939)

Samuel V. Stewart
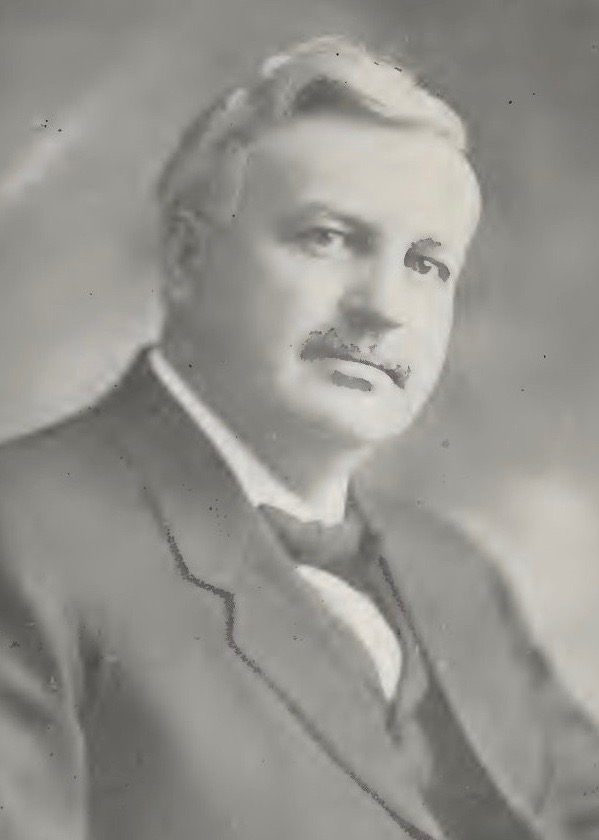

Justice of the Montana Supreme Court
- In office 1933–1939
- Governor: Frank Henry Cooney; Elmer Holt; Roy E. Ayers
- Chief Justice: Llewellyn L. Callaway; Walter B. Sands; O. F. Goddard
- Preceded by: Albert J. Galen
- Succeeded by: Leif Erickson

6th Governor of Montana
- In office January 6, 1913 – January 1, 1921
- Lieutenant: W.W. McDowell
- Preceded by: Edwin L. Norris
- Succeeded by: Joseph M. Dixon

Member of the Montana House of Representatives
- In office 1930–1932

Personal details
- Born: August 2, 1872 Woodsfield, Ohio, U.S.
- Died: September 15, 1939 (aged 67) Helena, Montana, U.S.
- Party: Democratic
- Education: University of Kansas
- Occupation: Lawyer

Samuel Vernon Stewart (August 2, 1872 – September 15, 1939) was an American attorney and Democratic Party politician, an attorney, former Montana Supreme Court Justice and the sixth Governor of Montana.

== Biography ==
Stewart was born in Monroe County, Ohio the son of farmer John Wilson and Baptist Maria (Carle) Stewart. He had two brothers named William and Harold, a sister named Sallie, and a sibling of unknown gender that died at birth. He attended Kansas State Normal School, and earned a Bachelor of Laws from the University of Kansas in 1898. On April 27, 1905, he married Stella Baker in Boonville, Missouri, and they had three daughters named Emily, Majorie, and Leah.

== Career ==
Stewart practiced law in Virginia City, Montana, where he served as city attorney and county attorney for Madison County, Montana. He was chosen as chairman of the Montana Democratic Party in 1910, serving for two years. He was a delegate to the Democratic National Convention in 1916, 1920, and 1924.

Stewart was elected Governor of Montana in 1912 and was re-elected in 1916, serving two terms from 1913 to 1921. It was under his governing that Jeannette Rankin became the first female Congress member. During his tenure, several labor laws were introduced, a fish and game law was sanctioned, a council of defense was authorized, a state highway commission was organized, a sedition act was passed, World War I issues were dealt with, and two additional justices were added to the state supreme court.

After leaving the office of Governor, Stewart returned to his law practice with the firm of John Griest Brown and served as city attorney of Helena. He challenged incumbent United States Senator Burton K. Wheeler in the Democratic primary in 1928, but lost to Wheeler in a landslide. He was elected to one term in the Montana House of Representatives (1930–32). In 1932, Stewart was appointed to the Montana Supreme Court, where he served until his death in 1939. While serving on the Supreme Court, he ran for the United States Senate once again in 1936, this time challenging incumbent Senator James E. Murray in the Democratic primary. However, he trailed far behind Murray, who narrowly won renomination against Congressman Joseph P. Monaghan.

== Death ==
Stewart died on September 15, 1939, and is interred at Forestvale Cemetery, Helena, Lewis and Clark County, Montana.

Party political offices
| Preceded by Edwin L. Norris | Democratic nominee for Governor of Montana; 1912, 1916 | Succeeded by Burton K. Wheeler |
Political offices
| Preceded by Edwin L. Norris | Governor of Montana; 1913–1921 | Succeeded by Joseph M. Dixon |
