= 1928 Montana gubernatorial election =

- November 6, 1928
- Turnout: 80.80%▲8.40
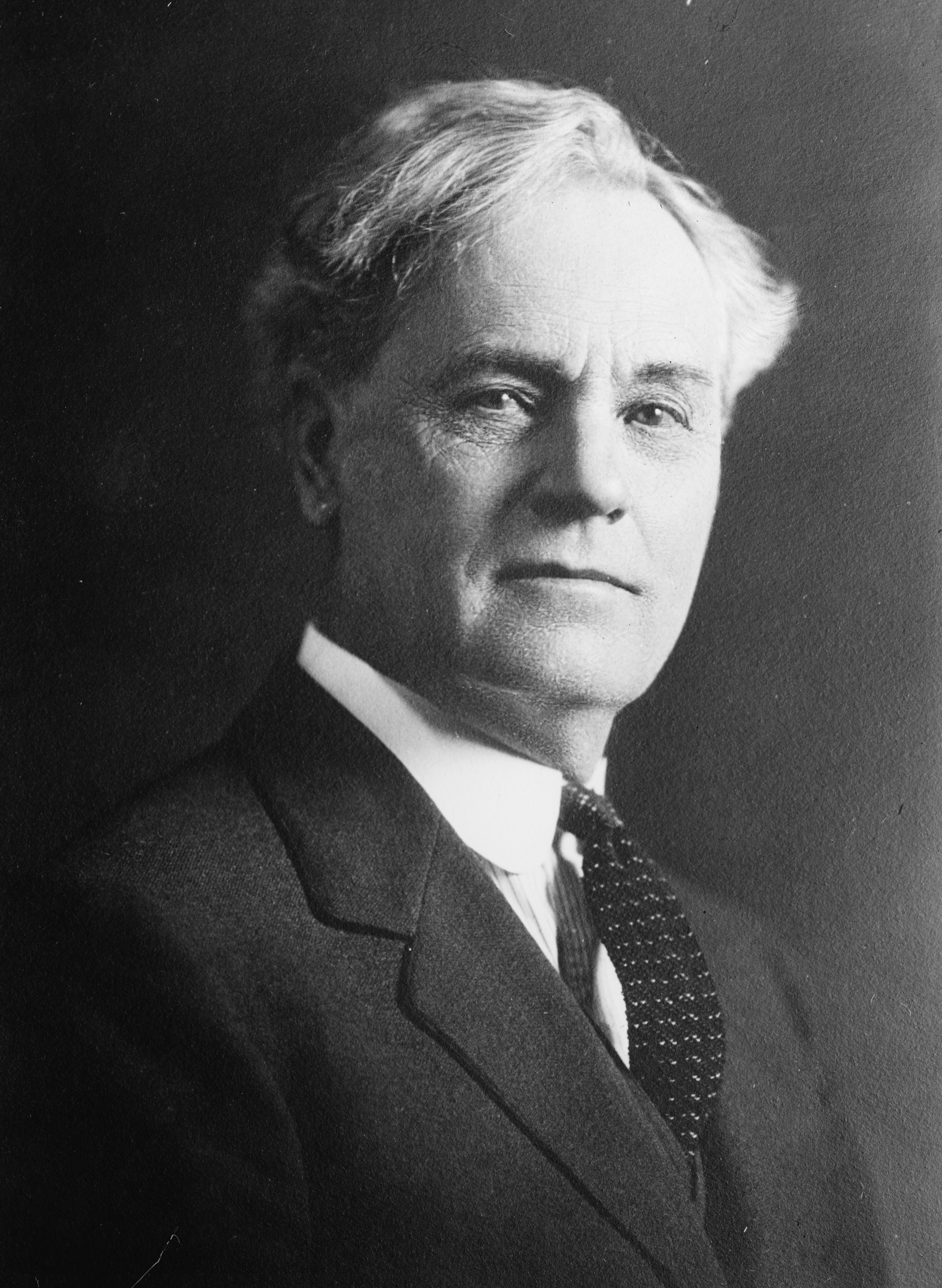

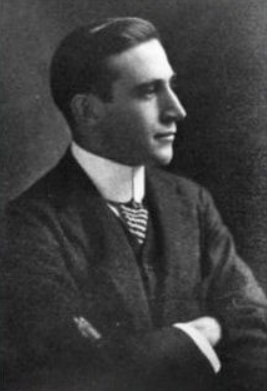
Nominee	John E. Erickson	Wellington D. Rankin
Party	Democratic	Republican
Popular vote	113,635	79,777
Percentage	58.52%	41.08%
- County results Erickson: 50–60% 60–70% 70–80% Rankin: 50–60%
Governor before election
John E. Erickson
Democratic
Elected Governor
John E. Erickson
Democratic

The 1928 Montana gubernatorial election took place on November 6, 1928. Incumbent Governor of Montana John E. Erickson, who was first elected governor in 1924, ran for re-election. Erickson only narrowly won the Democratic primary against future Governor Roy E. Ayers, and advanced to the general election, where he was opposed by U.S. Attorney Wellington D. Rankin, the former Attorney General of Montana. Although Herbert Hoover carried the state in a landslide in the presidential election that year, Erickson won re-election to his second term as governor in a landslide over Rankin.

== Democratic primary ==
=== Candidates ===
- John E. Erickson, incumbent Governor of Montana
- Roy E. Ayers, former Associate Justice of the Supreme Court of Montana

=== Results ===
Democratic Party primary results
Party	Candidate	Votes	%
Democratic	John E. Erickson (incumbent)	24,304	50.67
Democratic	Roy E. Ayers	23,665	49.33
Total votes		47,969	100.00

== Republican primary ==
=== Candidates ===
- Wellington D. Rankin, U.S. Attorney for the District of Montana and former Attorney General of Montana
- Lee Dennis, former chairman of the Montana Railroad and Public Service Commission
- W. J. Paul, former state senator
- J. W. Walker

=== Results ===
Republican Primary results
Party	Candidate	Votes	%
Republican	Wellington D. Rankin	30,778	45.58
Republican	Lee Dennis	16,209	24.00
Republican	W. J. Paul	11,337	16.79
Republican	J. W. Walker	9,206	13.63
Total votes		67,530	100.00

== General election ==
=== Results ===
Montana gubernatorial election, 1928
Party	Candidate	Votes	%	±%
Democratic	John E. Erickson (incumbent)	113,635	58.52%	+7.50%
Republican	Wellington D. Rankin	79,777	41.08%	−1.51%
Socialist	W. R. Duncan	781	0.40%	+0.13%
Majority		33,858	17.44%	+9.00%
Turnout		194,193		
Democratic hold		Swing		
