= Frank A. Hazelbaker =

American politician

Lieutenant Governor of Montana
- In office 1929–1933
- Governor: John E. Erickson
- Preceded by: W. S. McCormack
- Succeeded by: Frank Henry Cooney

Member of the Montana State Senate
- In office 1921–1929

Personal details
- Born: February 15, 1878 Linn County, Kansas, U.S.
- Died: July 6, 1939 (aged 61) Dillon, Montana, U.S.
- Party: Republican
- Relatives: Frank W. Hazelbaker (son)
- Occupation: Businessman, politician

Francis Albert Hazelbaker (February 15, 1878 – July 6, 1939) was an American politician in the state of Montana who served as Lieutenant Governor of Montana from 1929 to 1933. He also served in the Montana State Senate and was the Republican candidate for governor in 1932 and 1936, losing narrowly each time.

Hazelbaker was the Secretary of the Commission overseeing Montana's representation at the Panama–California Exposition in San Francisco (1915-7) and represented the Commission at the exposition. He had previously overseen the agricultural displays at the Montana state fair.

Hazelbaker was allergic to bee stings and died after being stung.

Hazelbaker married Carrie Eveline Woodworth (1887-1919), daughter of rancher and state legislator George E. Woodworth, in 1905; their son Frank W. Hazelbaker (1912-1990) also served in the state legislature. After Carrie's death of pneumonia during the Spanish flu pandemic, Hazelbaker married Lois Brown Brantly (1894-1972), the daughter of Theodore M. Brantley, the Chief Justice of the Montana Supreme Court; they had one son, Theodore Brantley Hazelbaker (1930-2006), who served several terms as chairman of the Montana state board of education.

Party political offices
Preceded by Wellington D. Rankin	Republican nominee for Governor of Montana; 1932, 1936	Succeeded by Sam C. Ford
Political offices
Preceded by W.S. McCormack	Lieutenant Governor of Montana; 1929–1933	Succeeded by Frank Henry Cooney
