= John E. Erickson (Montana politician) =

Governor of Montana (1863–1946)

John Edward Erickson
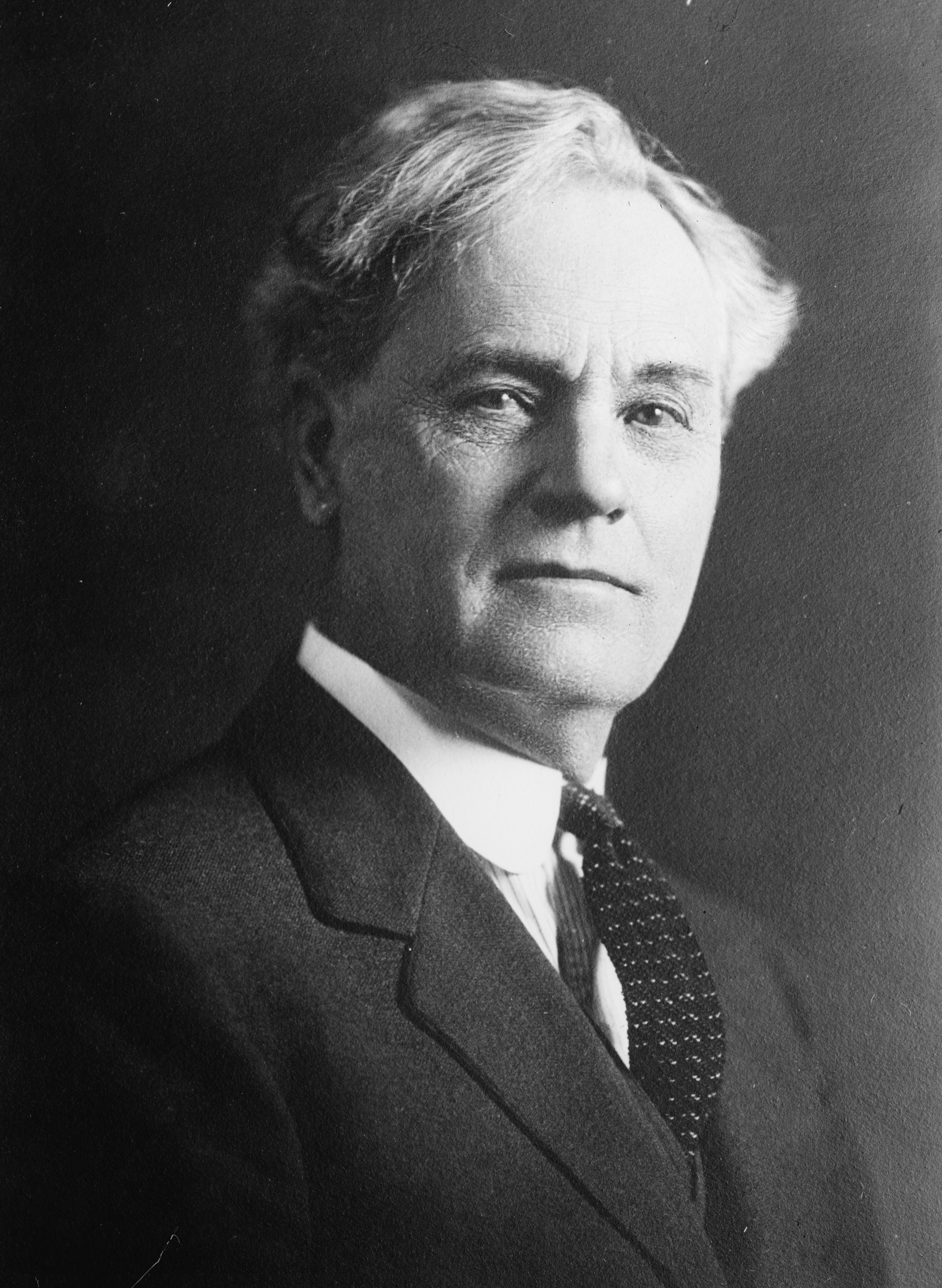

United States Senator from Montana
- In office March 13, 1933 – November 6, 1934
- Appointed by: Frank Henry Cooney
- Preceded by: Thomas J. Walsh
- Succeeded by: James E. Murray

8th Governor of Montana
- In office January 4, 1925 – March 13, 1933
- Lieutenant: W.S. McCormack; Frank A. Hazelbacker; Frank Henry Cooney
- Preceded by: Joseph M. Dixon
- Succeeded by: Frank Henry Cooney

Personal details
- Born: March 14, 1863 Stoughton, Wisconsin, U.S.
- Died: May 25, 1946 (aged 83) Helena, Montana, U.S.
- Party: Democratic
- Spouse: Grace Vance
- Education: Washburn University

John Edward Erickson (March 14, 1863 – May 25, 1946) was an American politician of the Democratic Party from Montana. He served as the eighth governor of Montana and as a United States senator.

== Biography ==
Erickson was born in Stoughton, Wisconsin. He was the son of E. Erickson and Olene Alma Erickson, both Norwegian immigrants. When he was one year old, he moved with his parents to Eureka, Kansas. He graduated from Washburn University in Topeka, Kansas in 1890. He studied law, was admitted to the bar in 1891 at Eureka, Kansas. He married Grace Vance in 1898 and they had three children. Erickson's nephew, Dale Prather, was an NFL player.

== Career ==
Erickson was admitted to the Kansas state bar in 1891. He moved to Great Falls, Montana in 1892 and later to Choteau, Montana, where he continued practicing law. He served as county attorney of Teton County from 1897 to 1905, then judge of the eleventh judicial district of Montana from 1905 to 1915. He resumed the practice of law at Kalispell, Montana in 1916. A Democrat, Erickson was elected in 1924 as the eighth Governor of Montana. He won reelection in 1928, and again in 1932, making him the only governor elected to three terms. He served from January 4, 1925 to March 13, 1933. During his tenure, a new state income tax was sanctioned, a fund to financially equalize impoverished rural schools was established, a gasoline tax was implemented, a new banking law was authorized, and a tax on mining profits was initiated.

On March 13, 1933, Erickson resigned as governor whereupon Frank Cooney, formerly Erickson's lieutenant governor and now the acting governor, appointed Erickson to the United States Senate to fill the vacancy caused by the death of Thomas J. Walsh. Although on the face of it, this appears to have been a rather brazen attempt on Erickson's part to establish himself in the Senate, Montana Senator Burton K. Wheeler tells a different story in his autobiography. Apparently Montana's Democratic National Committeeman, J. Bruce Kremer, was certain to be appointed to Walsh's seat. Walsh had very much disliked Kremer and worried that Kremer would succeed him if he (Walsh) accepted Franklin D. Roosevelt's appointment to his cabinet, as Attorney General (which Walsh had, at the time of his death). After Walsh's untimely demise, his daughter Genevieve Gudger asked Senator Wheeler if he would intercede with Governor Erickson to stop Kremer's appointment. As Wheeler also disliked Kremer, he agreed to do so. In Wheeler's telling, it was he who talked a reluctant Erickson into getting himself appointed. Erickson ran in 1934 to fill the remainder of Walsh's Senate term, but finished third in the primary, behind James E. Murray, who went on to win the special general election, and James F. O'Connor. He continued to serve in the Senate through November 6, 1934, the day that Murray was elected, at which point he resigned in favor of Murray, in order to give Murray seniority rights over other freshman senators, who didn't start their terms until 1935. Following his return from the Senate, Erickson practiced law in Helena, Montana, until his death.

== Death ==
Erickson died on May 25, 1946, and is entombed at Conrad Memorial Cemetery, Kalispell, Flathead County, Montana.

== Sources ==
- Wheeler, Burton K. with Paul F. Healy (1977). Yankee From the West. Octagon Books (reprint).

== Note ==
- United States Congress. "John E. Erickson (id: E000202)". Biographical Directory of the United States Congress.

Party political offices
Preceded by Burton K. Wheeler	Democratic nominee for Governor of Montana; 1924, 1928, 1932	Succeeded by Roy E. Ayers
Political offices
Preceded by Joseph M. Dixon	Governor of Montana; January 4, 1925 – March 13, 1933	Succeeded by Frank Henry Cooney
U.S. Senate
Preceded by Thomas J. Walsh	United States Senator from Montana; March 13, 1933 – November 6, 1934	Succeeded by James Edward Murray
