= Caldwell Edwards =

American politician (1841–1922)

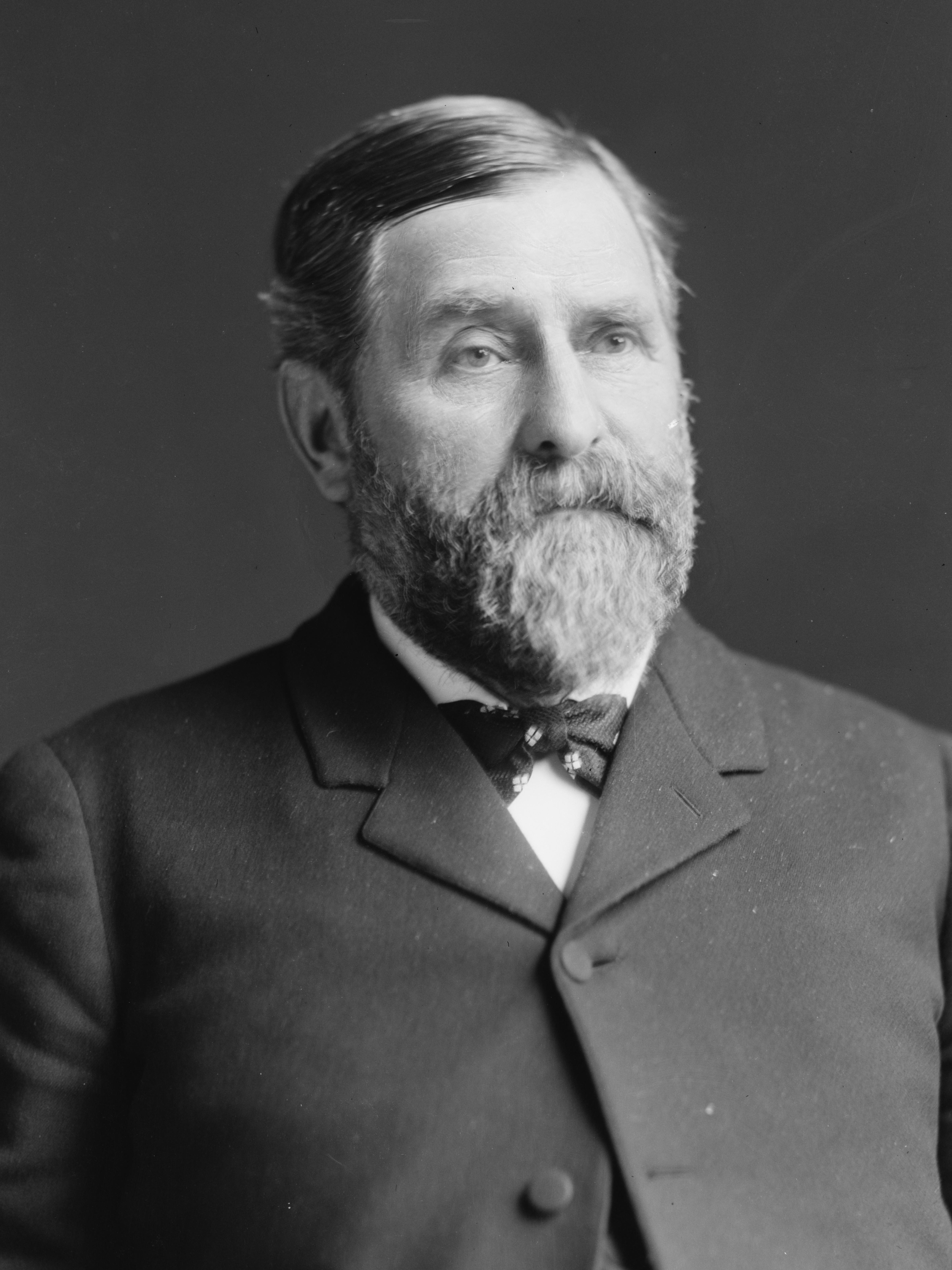
- Edwards c. 1901–1903

Member of the U.S. House of Representatives from Montana's at-large district
- In office March 4, 1901 – March 3, 1903
- Preceded by: Albert J. Campbell
- Succeeded by: Joseph M. Dixon

Member of the Montana House of Representatives
- In office 1901–1905

Personal details
- Born: January 8, 1841 Sag Harbor, New York, U.S.
- Died: July 23, 1922 (aged 81) Sag Harbor, New York, U.S.
- Resting place: Oakland Cemetery
- Party: Populist
- Profession: Politician

Caldwell Edwards (January 8, 1841 – July 23, 1922) was a U.S. representative from Montana.

Born in Sag Harbor, New York, Edwards was educated in the district schools. He worked as a salesman and bookkeeper in dry-goods stores for several years. He moved to Bozeman, Montana, in 1864 and became engaged in agricultural pursuits. He served as a member of the Montana House of Representatives from 1901 to 1905.

Edwards was elected as a Populist to the Fifty-seventh Congress. He was not a candidate for renomination in 1902. At the expiration of his term Edwards returned to his ranch. He later returned to Sag Harbor, where he lived in retirement. He died at his Sag Harbor home on July 23, 1922, after suffering a stroke. Edwards was interred in Oakland Cemetery.

U.S. House of Representatives
Preceded by Albert J. Campbell	Member of the U.S. House of Representatives from Montana's at-large congressional district 1901-1903	Succeeded by Joseph M. Dixon
