= Edna Rankin McKinnon =

Birth control reformer

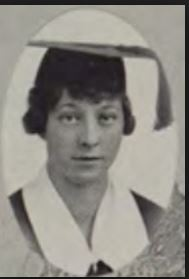
- Born: October 21, 1893; Missoula, Montana
- Died: April 5, 1978 (aged 84); Carmel, California
- Education: University of Wisconsin; Wellesley College; University of Montana School of Law
- Spouse: John W. McKinnon (m. 1919–1930)
- Children: 2
- Relatives: Jeannette Rankin (sister); Wellington D. Rankin (brother)

Edna Bertha Rankin McKinnon (October 21, 1893 – April 5, 1978) was an American social activist for birth control. She was the executive director of the Chicago Planned Parenthood chapter.

== Early life ==
Rankin McKinnon was the youngest child born to her parents Olive and John Rankin. Her eldest sister, Jeannette Rankin, would become the first woman elected to the United States Congress.

== Education ==
Rankin McKinnon was elected President of the Suffragette League in 1915. She earned her law degree from the University of Montana School of Law in 1919. She subsequently became the first Montana-born woman to pass the bar exam in Montana. After earning her degree, she married John W. McKinnon without a proper education on birth control. With McKinnon, they had two children before eventually divorcing. While married, she miscarried and became sterile. After her divorce, she attended a lecture on birth control and reproduction given by Mordecai Ezekiel.

Her sister helped her earn a position with the Resettlement Administration. After meeting Margaret Sanger, she was encouraged to become a field worker in Montana to inform women about birth control. From 1937 until 1946, she travelled across the United States to spread the word of birth control as a member of the Margaret Sanger Research Bureau. Rankin McKinnon soon resigned from the Margaret Sanger Research Bureau due to a dislike for new management. She later teamed up with Clarence Gamble and the Pathfinder International Fund. However, due to her brother Wellington's disapproval, she was unable to convince Montana to sell birth control. Gamble offered McKinnon $50 to set up a birth control clinic, which she successfully started, and formed a Planned Parenthood branch in Bali.

She was elected executive director of the Chicago Planned Parenthood chapter in 1947. Under her leadership, she oversaw 10 Planned Parenthood clinics across Chicago. She also earned an honorary degree from the University of Montana in 1974. During that year, Wilma Dykeman published a biography on Rankin McKinnon titled "Too Many People, Too Little Love: Edna Rankin McKinnon: Pioneer for Birth Control."

Rankin McKinnon died on April 5, 1978.
