= W. S. McCormack =

American politician

Lieutenant Governor of Montana
- In office 1925–1929
- Governor: John E. Erickson
- Preceded by: Nelson Story, Jr.
- Succeeded by: Frank A. Hazelbaker

Member of the Montana House of Representatives

Personal details
- Born: William Samuel McCormack; November 10, 1863 Chicago, Illinois, U.S.
- Died: September 5, 1946 (aged 82) en route to California
- Party: Republican
- Occupation: Businessman, farmer

William Samuel McCormack (November 10, 1863 – September 5, 1946) was an American politician in the state of Montana who served as Lieutenant Governor of Montana from 1925 to 1929. McCormack, who lived in Kalispell, Montana, was a farmer and businessman. He also served in the Montana House of Representatives.

Political offices
| Preceded by Nelson Story, Jr. | Lieutenant Governor of Montana; 1925–1929 | Succeeded by Frank A. Hazelbaker |
