= Joseph M. Dixon =

American politician (1867–1934)

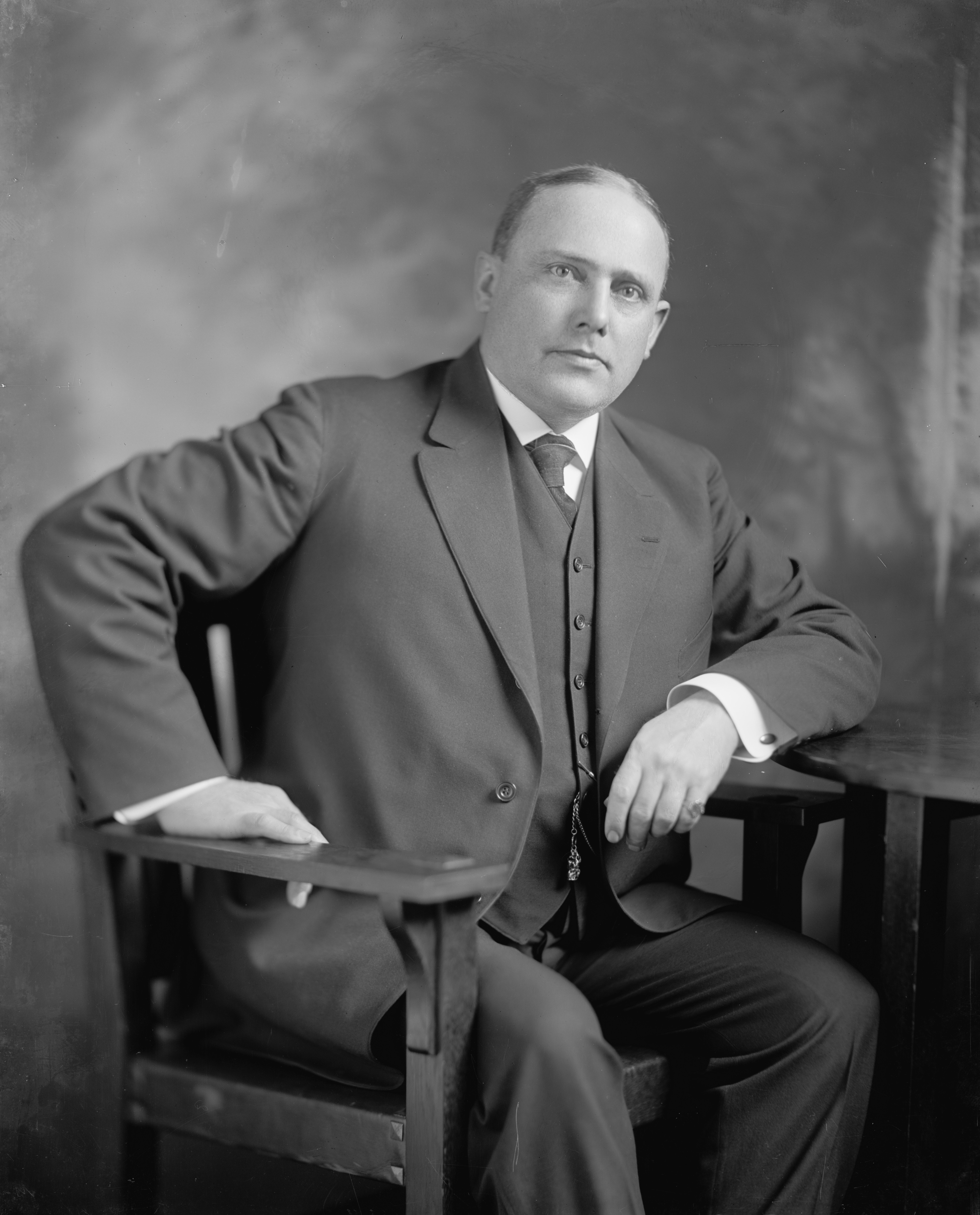
- Dixon, 1905–1934

7th Governor of Montana
- In office January 3, 1921 – January 4, 1925
- Lieutenant: Nelson Story Jr.
- Preceded by: Sam V. Stewart
- Succeeded by: John E. Erickson

United States Senator from Montana
- In office March 4, 1907 – March 3, 1913
- Preceded by: William A. Clark
- Succeeded by: Thomas J. Walsh

Member of the U.S. House of Representatives from Montana's at-large district
- In office March 4, 1903 – March 3, 1907
- Preceded by: Caldwell Edwards
- Succeeded by: Charles N. Pray

Member of the Montana House of Representatives
- In office 1900–1902

Personal details
- Born: Joseph Moore Dixon; July 31, 1867 Snow Camp, North Carolina, U.S.
- Died: May 22, 1934 (aged 66) Missoula, Montana, U.S.
- Resting place: Missoula Cemetery
- Party: Republican

Joseph Moore Dixon (July 31, 1867 – May 22, 1934) was an American Republican politician from Montana. He served as a U.S. representative, senator, and the seventh governor of Montana. A businessman and a modernizer of Quaker heritage, Dixon was a leader of the Progressive Movement in Montana and nationally. He was the national chairman for Theodore Roosevelt running for the presidency as the candidate of the Progressive Party in 1912.

== Early life ==
Dixon was born in Snow Camp, North Carolina, to a Quaker family, the son of Flora Adaline (Murchison) and Hugh W. Dixon. His father operated a farm and a small factory. Dixon attended Quaker colleges, Earlham College in Indiana and Guilford College in North Carolina, graduating in 1889. He excelled at history, debate and oratory. Dixon moved to the frontier town of Missoula, Montana, in 1891, where he studied law and was admitted to the bar in 1892. Although he left the Quaker faith, he never abandoned Quaker ideals.

== Early career ==
Dixon served as assistant prosecuting attorney of Missoula County from 1893 to 1895 and prosecuting attorney from 1895 to 1897. In 1900, he served in the Montana House of Representatives. He married Caroline M. Worden, daughter of prominent Missoula businessman Francis Lyman Worden, in 1896. They had seven children: Virginia, Florence, Dorothy, Betty, Mary Joe, Peggy, and Frank. Frank died shortly after birth. Dixon grew wealthy through his law practice and his investments in real estate; to further his political ambitions in 1900 he bought a Missoula newspaper, the Missoulian.

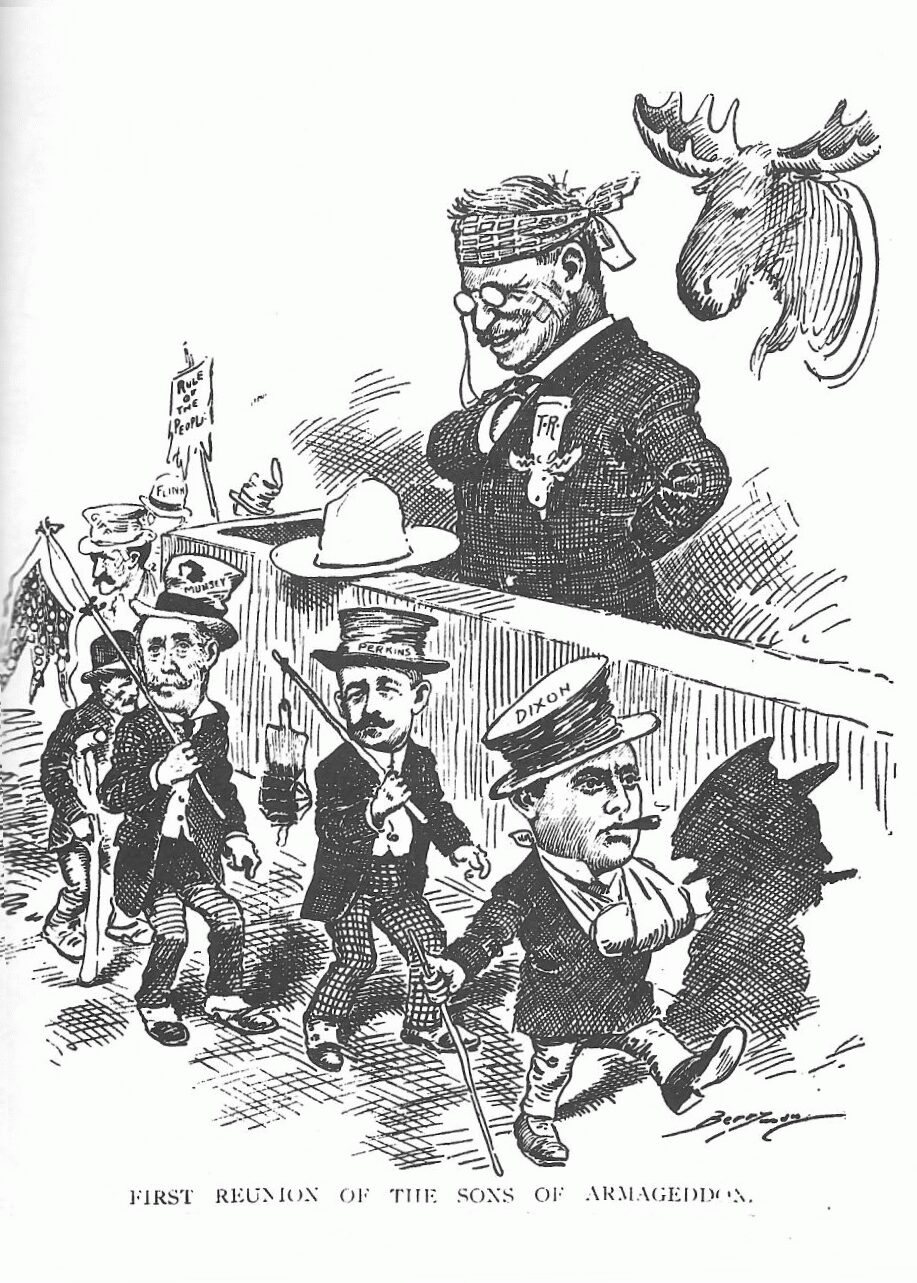
After the defeat the loser reviews his wounded lieutenants Frank Munsey, George Walbridge Perkins and Dixon. From The Evening Star (Washington DC) Dec 10, 1912

== Political career ==
Dixon took advantage of the internal dissension among rival factions of the Democratic party to rise rapidly in politics.

=== Congress ===
In 1902 and 1904 he won congressional races, and in 1907 the Montana legislature chose him for a U.S. Senate seat. He became an ardent admirer of President Theodore Roosevelt, and joined the progressive wing of the party, fighting the conservatives. He unsuccessfully ran for reelection in 1912, but that year, he was the campaign manager for Roosevelt and chaired the National Progressive Convention that nominated Roosevelt on the third-party Progressive Party ("Bull Moose") ticket as the GOP split between progressives and stand-patters. Democrat Woodrow Wilson won in a landslide.

Out of office, Dixon returned to Montana to look after his newspaper properties, and to battle the Amalgamated Copper Company, the behemoth that dominated both political parties through its corrupt spending. He returned to the Republican Party. He finally sold his newspapers, and they were taken over by Amalgamated.

=== Governor ===
In 1920, Dixon ran for Governor of Montana, and, following farmer unrest that weakened the copper company, Dixon was carried by the national Republican landslide into office as governor, defeating Democratic nominee Burton K. Wheeler comfortably.

His term as governor ran from 1921 to 1925 and was marked by severe economic hardship in the state that limited the opportunities for action by the state government. In addition, businesses such as Anaconda Copper mobilized their resources to defeat the governor’s plans for reform. He was defeated for reelection in 1924 by John E. Erickson and for the Senate in 1928, losing to his one-time foe, Wheeler, in the general election.

=== Federal appointment ===
In 1929 he was appointed First Assistant Secretary of the Interior, and served in that position until 1933.

In 1930, he was involved with a project to develop water power on the Flathead Indian Reservation, and with it, a complex network of water rights for the Reservation.

== Death and burial ==
He died in Missoula, Montana, on May 22, 1934, due to heart problems. He is interred at the Missoula Cemetery in Missoula, Montana.

Party political offices
Preceded by Frank J. Edwards	Republican nominee for Governor of Montana; 1920, 1924	Succeeded by Wellington D. Rankin
Preceded by Carl W. Riddick	Republican nominee for U.S. Senator from Montana (Class 1); 1928	Succeeded by George M. Bourquin
U.S. House of Representatives
Preceded by Caldwell Edwards	Member of the U.S. House of Representatives from Montana's at-large congressional district 1903–1907	Succeeded by Charles N. Pray
U.S. Senate
Preceded by William A. Clark	U.S. senator from Montana; 1907–1913	Succeeded by Thomas J. Walsh
Political offices
Preceded by Sam V. Stewart	Governor of Montana; 1921-1925	Succeeded by John Edward Erickson
