= 1916 Montana gubernatorial election =

- November 7, 1916
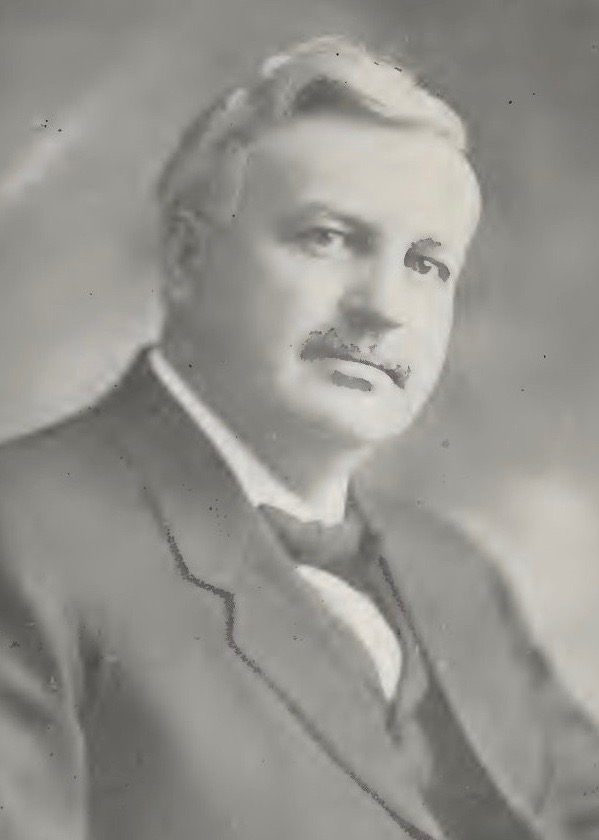

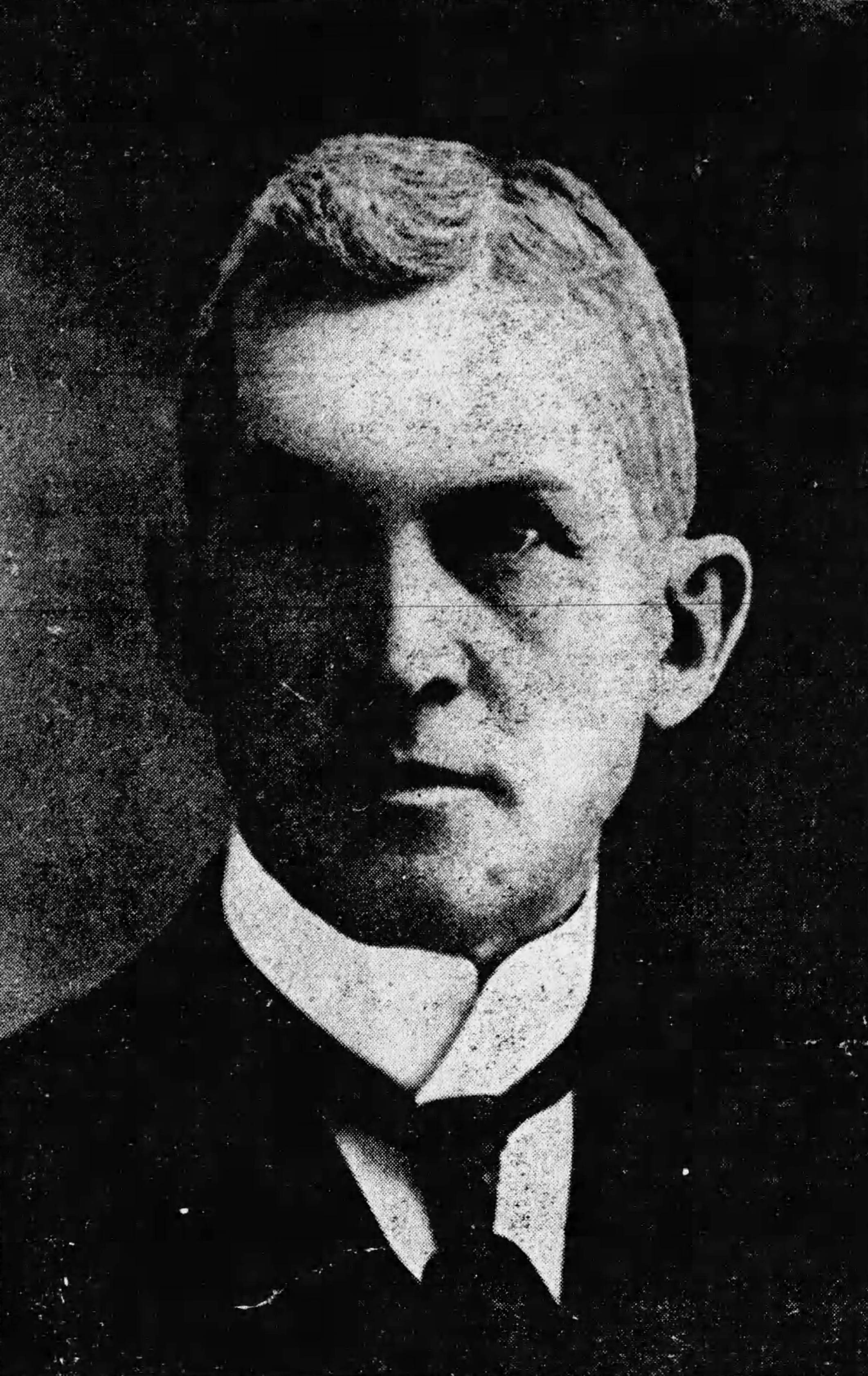

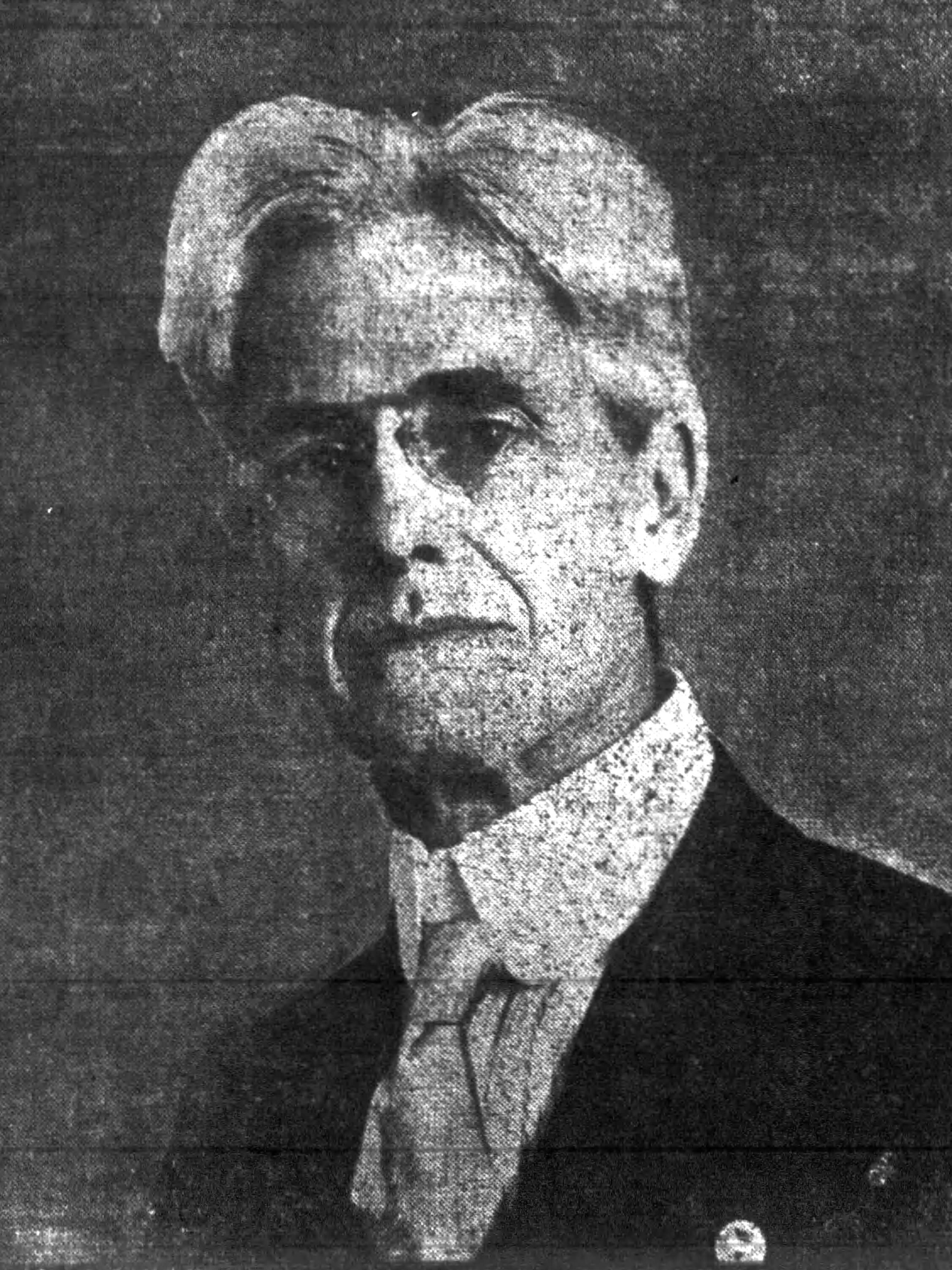
Nominee	Sam V. Stewart	Frank J. Edwards	Lewis Johnstone Duncan
Party	Democratic	Republican	Socialist
Popular vote	85,683	76,547	11,342
Percentage	49.36%	44.10%	6.53%
- County results Stewart: 40–50% 50–60% 60–70% Edwards: 40–50% 50–60%
Governor before election
Sam V. Stewart
Democratic
Elected Governor
Sam V. Stewart
Democratic

The 1916 Montana gubernatorial election took place on November 7, 1916. Incumbent Governor of Montana Sam V. Stewart, who was first elected governor in 1912, ran for re-election. After comfortably winning the Democratic primary, he advanced to the general election, where he faced Frank J. Edwards, the former mayor of Helena, who narrowly emerged victorious in a close Republican primary. Benefitting from then-President Woodrow Wilson's landslide victory in Montana in the presidential election that year, Stewart narrowly won re-election to his second and final term as governor.

== Democratic primary ==
=== Candidates ===
- Sam V. Stewart, incumbent Governor of Montana
- Miles Romney Sr., former State Senator, former mayor of Hamilton

=== Results ===
Democratic Party primary results
Party	Candidate	Votes	%
Democratic	Sam V. Stewart (incumbent)	28,185	70.46
Democratic	Miles Romney, Sr.	11,816	29.54
Total votes		40,001	100.00

== Republican primary ==
=== Candidates ===
- Frank J. Edwards, former mayor of Helena
- Edward H. Cooney, Postmaster of Great Falls, former State Representative
- Albert J. Galen, former Attorney General of Montana
- Charles S. Henderson
- Walter B. Sands
- E. A. Gerhart
- I. A. Leighton

=== Results ===
Republican Primary results
Party	Candidate	Votes	%
Republican	Frank J. Edwards	13,933	28.36
Republican	E. H. Cooney	10,425	21.22
Republican	Albert J. Galen	9,554	19.45
Republican	Charles S. Henderson	6,014	12.24
Republican	Walter B. Sands	4,639	9.44
Republican	E. A. Gerhart	3,102	6.31
Republican	I. A. Leighton	1,461	2.97
Total votes		49,128	100.00

== General election ==
=== Results ===
Montana gubernatorial election, 1916
Party	Candidate	Votes	%	±%
Democratic	Sam V. Stewart (incumbent)	85,683	49.36%	+17.55%
Republican	Frank J. Edwards	76,547	44.10%	+15.33%
Socialist	Lewis J. Duncan	11,342	6.53%	−9.22%
Majority		9,136	5.26%	+2.22%
Turnout		173,572		
Democratic hold		Swing		
