= Albert J. Campbell =

American politician (1857–1907)

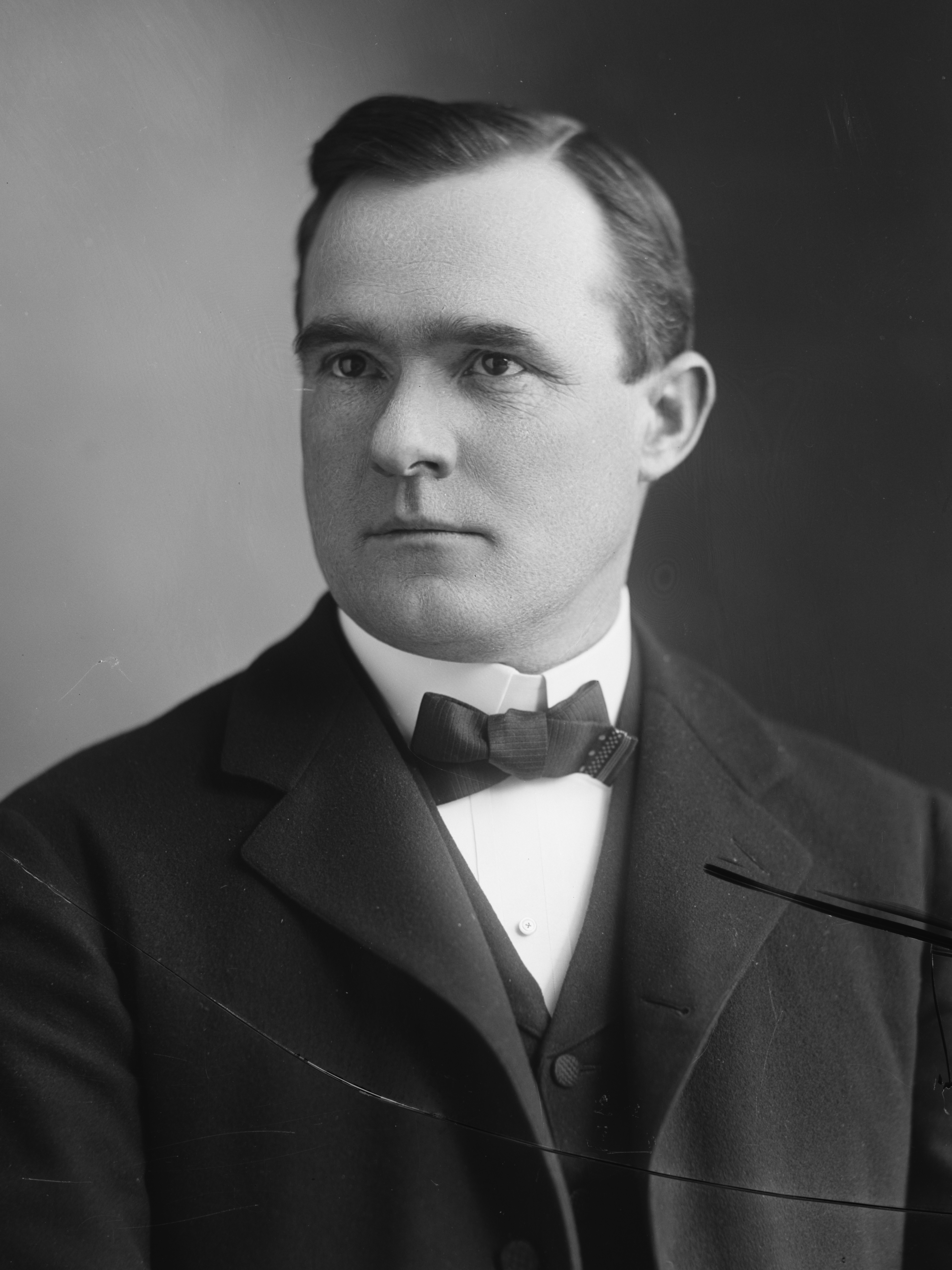
- Campbell c. 1894–1901

Member of the U.S. House of Representatives from Montana's at-large district
- In office March 4, 1899 – March 3, 1901
- Preceded by: Charles S. Hartman
- Succeeded by: Caldwell Edwards

Member of the Montana House of Representatives
- In office 1897

Personal details
- Born: Albert James Campbell; December 12, 1857 Pontiac, Michigan, U.S.
- Died: August 9, 1907 (aged 49) New York City, U.S.
- Resting place: Mount Moriah Cemetery, Butte, Montana, U.S.
- Party: Democratic
- Education: State Agricultural College
- Profession: Politician, lawyer

Albert James Campbell (December 12, 1857 – August 9, 1907) was a U.S. representative from Montana.

Born in Pontiac, Michigan, Campbell attended the common schools and the State Agricultural College, Lansing (now Michigan State University). He taught school for several years, and then studied law. He was admitted to the bar in 1881 and commenced practice in Oxford, Michigan. He moved to Clarke, Michigan, in 1882, and resumed the practice of law. He served as prosecuting attorney of Lake County, Michigan, from 1886 to 1888 when he resigned. He moved to Butte, Montana, on November 16, 1889, and continued the practice of his profession. He served as member of the Montana House of Representatives in 1897.

Campbell was elected as a Democrat to the Fifty-sixth Congress (March 4, 1899 – March 3, 1901). He declined to be a candidate for renomination in 1900. He resumed the practice of law in Butte, Montana. He died in New York City, August 9, 1907. He was interred in Mount Moriah Cemetery, Butte, Montana.

U.S. House of Representatives
Preceded by Charles S. Hartman	Member of the U.S. House of Representatives from Montana's at-large congressional district 1899-1901	Succeeded by Caldwell Edwards
