= Nelson Story Jr. =

American politician (1878–1932)

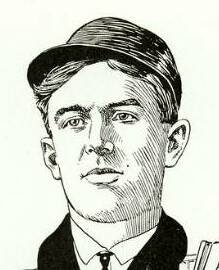
- 1911 caricature of Story

Lieutenant Governor of Montana
- In office 1921–1925
- Governor: Joseph M. Dixon
- Preceded by: W. W. McDowell
- Succeeded by: W. S. McCormack

Member of the Montana House of Representatives
- In office 1902–1910

Personal details
- Born: May 12, 1874 Bozeman, Montana, U.S.
- Died: October 21, 1932 (aged 58) Bozeman, Montana, U.S.
- Party: Republican
- Relations: Nelson Story (father)
- Children: two
- Occupation: Businessman, politician

Nelson Story Jr. (February 15, 1878 – October 21, 1932), also known as Bud Story, was an American politician in the state of Montana who served as Lieutenant Governor of Montana from 1921 to 1925. He also served in the Montana State Legislature in the 1902 and 1910 sessions, as mayor of Bozeman, and commissioner of Gallatin County, Montana. His father was Nelson Story, a pioneer settler in Bozeman. Nelson Jr. was educated at the Shattuck (Minnesota) and Ogden (Utah) Military academies. A businessman, he owned a machine shop and iron foundry, served as vice president of a milling company, and was involved in the gold mining industry. Story died of a stroke while driving in Bozeman, Montana in 1932.
