= 1924 Montana gubernatorial election =

- November 4, 1924
- Turnout: 72.40%▲3.90
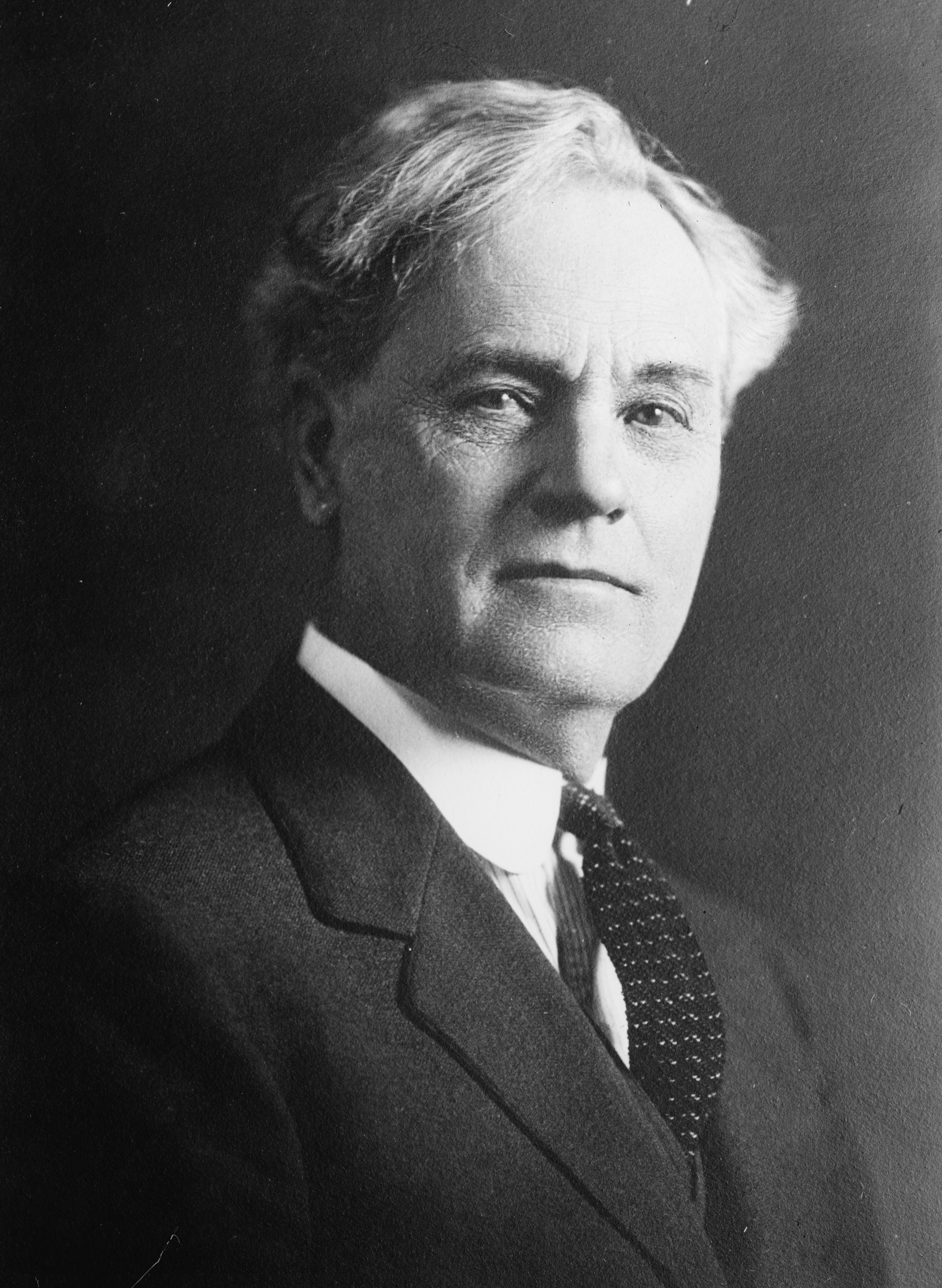

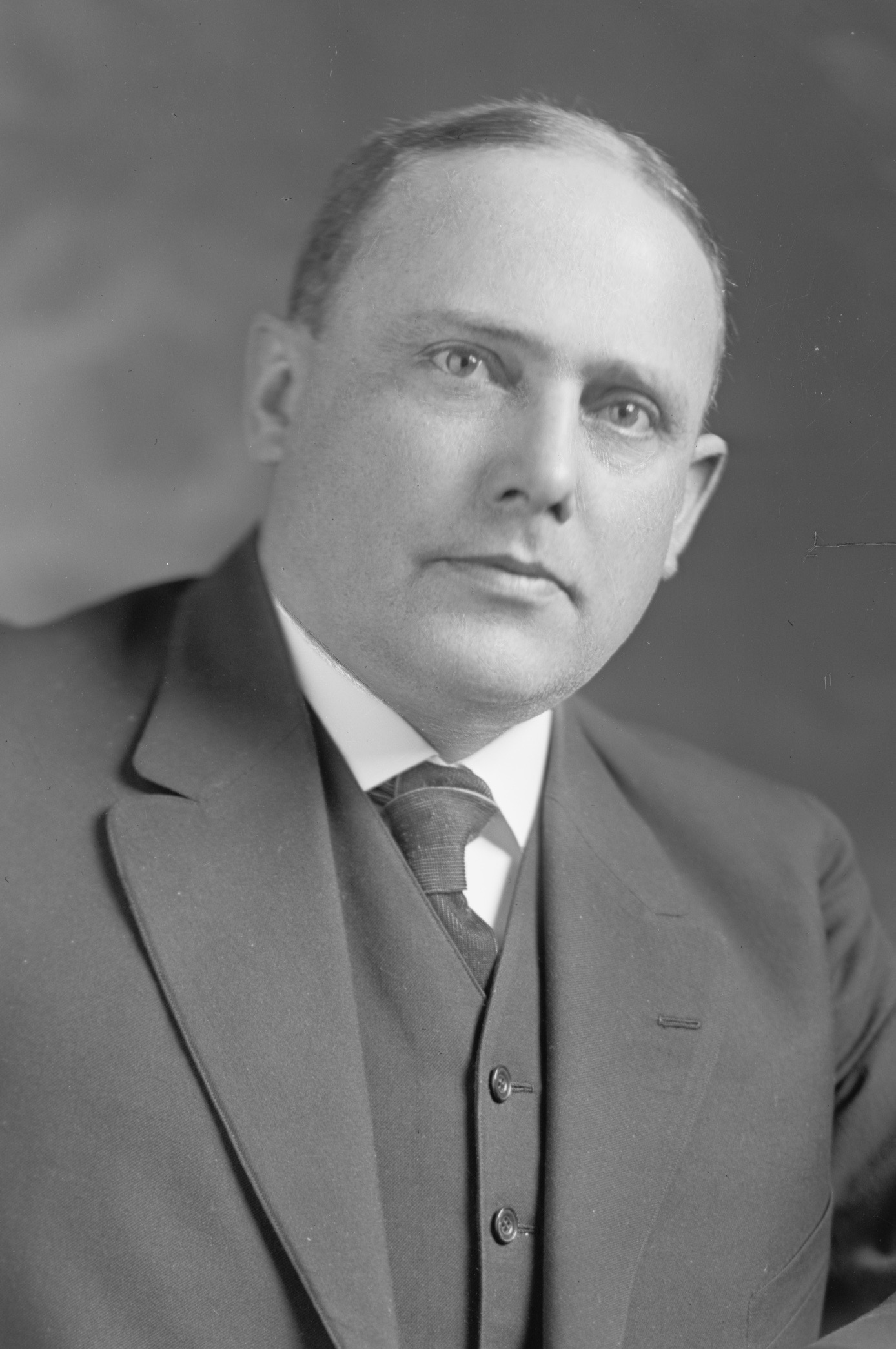

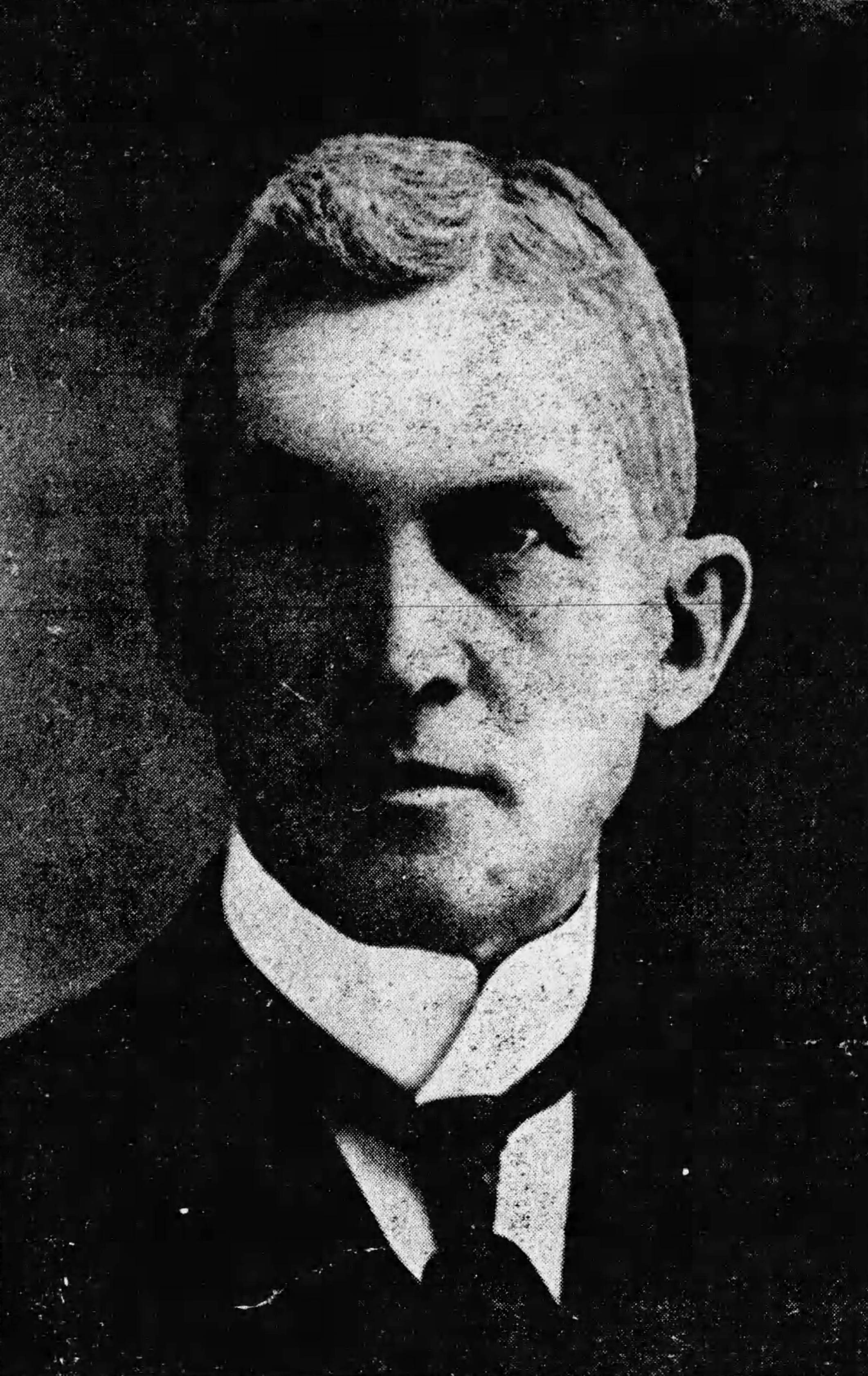
| Nominee | John E. Erickson | Joseph M. Dixon | Frank J. Edwards |
| Party | Democratic | Republican | Farmer–Labor |
| Popular vote | 88,801 | 74,126 | 10,666 |
| Percentage | 51.02% | 42.59% | 6.13% |
- County results Erickson: 40–50% 50–60% 60–70% 80–90% Dixon: 40–50% 50–60% 60–70% Edwards: 50–60%
Governor before election
Joseph M. Dixon
Republican
Elected Governor
John E. Erickson
Democratic

The 1924 Montana gubernatorial election took place on November 4, 1924. Incumbent governor of Montana Joseph M. Dixon, who was first elected governor in 1920, ran for re-election. Dixon won a competitive Republican primary, and moved on to the general election, where he faced John E. Erickson, a former district court judge and the Democratic nominee; and Frank J. Edwards, the 1916 Republican nominee for governor and the Farmer–Labor Party nominee. Ultimately, Erickson managed to defeat Dixon in his bid for re-election, winning what would be the first of three terms as governor.

== Democratic primary ==
=== Candidates ===
- John E. Erickson, former Eleventh Judicial District Judge
- Roy E. Ayers, former Associate Justice of the Supreme Court of Montana
- Miles Romney Sr., former State Senator, former Mayor of Hamilton
- I. G. Denny, former Missoula County Attorney
- Sam J. Hampton

=== Results ===
Democratic Party primary results
| Party | Candidate | Votes | % |
|---|---|---|---|
| Democratic | John E. Erickson | 13,914 | 35.13 |
| Democratic | Roy E. Ayers | 9,268 | 23.40 |
| Democratic | Miles Romney, Sr. | 6,554 | 16.55 |
| Democratic | I. G. Denny | 6,340 | 16.01 |
| Democratic | Sam J. Hampton | 3,533 | 8.92 |
| Total votes | | 39,609 | 100.00 |

== Farmer–Labor Party primary ==
=== Candidates ===
- Frank J. Edwards, 1916 Republican nominee for Governor of Montana

=== Results ===
Farmer–Labor Party Primary results
| Party | Candidate | Votes | % |
|---|---|---|---|
| Farmer–Labor | Frank J. Edwards | 2,636 | 100.00 |
| Total votes | | 2,636 | 100.00 |

== Republican primary ==
=== Candidates ===
- Joseph M. Dixon, incumbent governor of Montana
- Lee Dennis, former Chairman of the Montana Railroad and Public Service Commission

=== Results ===
Republican Primary results
| Party | Candidate | Votes | % |
|---|---|---|---|
| Republican | Joseph M. Dixon (incumbent) | 40,388 | 55.70 |
| Republican | Lee Dennis | 32,118 | 44.30 |
| Total votes | | 72,506 | 100.00 |

== General election ==
=== Results ===
Montana gubernatorial election, 1924
| Party | Candidate | Votes | % | ±% |
|---|---|---|---|---|
| Democratic | John E. Erickson | 88,801 | 51.02% | +10.75% |
| Republican | Joseph M. Dixon (incumbent) | 74,126 | 42.59% | −17.16% |
| Farmer–Labor | Frank J. Edwards | 10,666 | 6.13% | |
| Socialist | J. H. Matheson | 466 | 0.27% | |
| Majority | | 14,675 | 8.43% | −11.05% |
| Turnout | | 174,059 | | |
| Democratic gain from Republican | | Swing | | |
