= 1936 United States Senate election in Montana =

- November 3, 1936
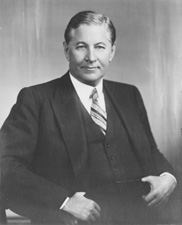

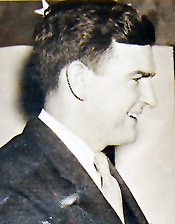
Nominee	James E. Murray	Thomas Larson	Joseph P. Monaghan
Party	Democratic	Republican	Independent
Popular vote	121,769	60,038	39,655
Percentage	54.98%	27.11%	17.91%
- County results Murray: 40–50% 50–60% 60–70% 70–80% Monaghan: 40–50% No data Tie
U.S. senator before election
James E. Murray
Democratic
Elected U.S. Senator
James E. Murray
Democratic

The 1936 United States Senate election in Montana took place on November 3, 1936. Incumbent United States Senator James E. Murray, who was first elected to the Senate in a special election in 1934, ran for re-election. He narrowly emerged from a competitive and close Democratic primary, wherein he was challenged by United States Congressman Joseph P. Monaghan, who represented Montana's 1st congressional district. In the general election, Murray was opposed by Thomas O. Larson, a State Senator and the Republican nominee, and Monaghan, who, after losing the primary, ran as an independent candidate. Murray ended up winning a second term, and his first full term, in a landslide, defeating both of his opponents by a comfortable margin.

== Democratic primary ==
=== Candidates ===
- James E. Murray, incumbent United States Senator
- Joseph P. Monaghan, U.S. Representative from Butte
- Sam V. Stewart, Montana Supreme Court Associate Justice, former Governor of Montana
- Walter B. Sands, Montana Supreme Court Chief Justice

=== Results ===
Democratic Party primary results
Party	Candidate	Votes	%
Democratic	James E. Murray (incumbent)	47,154	42.31%
Democratic	Joseph P. Monaghan	44,956	40.34%
Democratic	Sam V. Stewart	12,191	10.94%
Democratic	Walter B. Sands	7,145	6.41%
Total votes		111,446	100.00%

== Republican primary ==
=== Candidates ===
- Thomas O. Larson, State Senator
- L. Ray Carroll, State Senator
- Hugh Egan State Representative
- Jess H. Stevens, attorney

=== Results ===
Republican Primary results
Party	Candidate	Votes	%
Republican	Thomas O. Larson	11,962	31.75%
Republican	L. Ray Carroll	9,237	24.51%
Republican	Hugh Egan	8,474	22.49%
Republican	Jess H. Stevens	8,006	21.25%
Total votes		37,679	100.00%

== General election ==
=== Results ===
United States Senate election in Montana, 1936
Party	Candidate	Votes	%	±%
Democratic	James E. Murray (incumbent)	121,769	54.98%	−4.68%
Republican	Thomas O. Larson	60,038	27.11%	−12.32%
Independent	Joseph P. Monaghan	39,655	17.91%	
Majority		61,731	27.87%	+7.65%
Turnout		221,462		
Democratic hold		Swing		

== See also ==
- United States Senate elections, 1936
