= Lewis J. Duncan =

American socialist

The Reverend Lewis J. Duncan
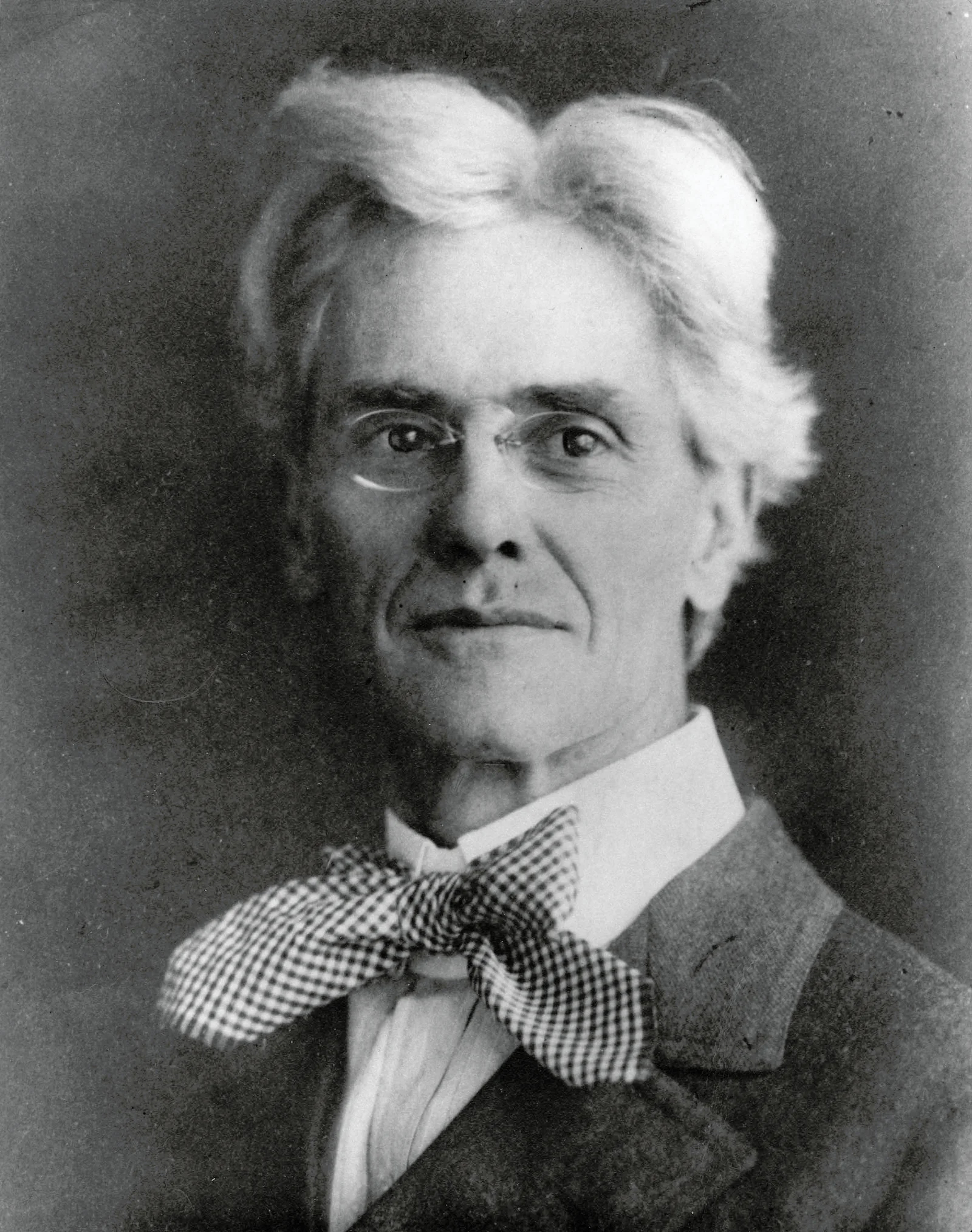
- Duncan c. 1911–1914

Mayor of Butte
- In office May 1, 1911 – October 6, 1914
- Preceded by: Charles P. Nevin
- Succeeded by: Clarence A. Smith

Personal details
- Born: Lewis Johnstone Duncan; May 4, 1857 St. Louis, Missouri, U.S.
- Died: January 26, 1936 (aged 78) Rochester, Minnesota, U.S.
- Party: Socialist
- Other political affiliations: Nonpartisan League
- Spouse: Kate Turner Keath (m. 1882)
- Children: Edith; Edwin
- Education: Hanover College
- Occupation: Unitarian minister
- Known for: First Socialist mayor of Butte

Lewis Johnstone Duncan (May 4, 1857 – January 26, 1936) was an American Unitarian minister and politician who served two terms as mayor of Butte, Montana. He was Butte's first Socialist mayor, and the first to be re-elected. He was recalled from office in 1914.
