= Joseph P. Monaghan =

United States Congressman

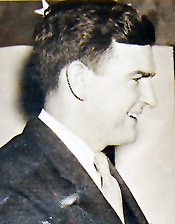

Member of the U.S. House of Representatives from Montana's 1st district
- In office March 4, 1933 – January 3, 1937
- Preceded by: John M. Evans
- Succeeded by: Jerry J. O'Connell

Personal details
- Born: March 26, 1906 Butte, Montana, U.S.
- Died: July 4, 1985 (aged 79) Butte, Montana, U.S.
- Party: Democratic
- Education: Mount St. Charles College; Montana State University at Missoula

Joseph Patrick Monaghan (March 26, 1906 – July 4, 1985) of Butte, Montana was a U.S. representative from Montana from 1933 to 1937. He was a Democrat. In 1936 he decided not to run for reelection and instead challenged Democratic incumbent United States senator James E. Murray in the Democratic primary. When Murray won, Monaghan ran in the general election as an independent. Murray soundly defeated Monaghan and Republican T.O. Larsen. Murray received 55% of the vote, Larsen 27% of the vote and Monaghan 18%. At the age of 30, Monaghan's political career came to an end. He returned to his law practice, and returned to politics only briefly in 1964 when he ran for the Democratic nomination unsuccessfully for the United States Senate in Montana, against Senate Majority leader Mike Mansfield.

U.S. House of Representatives
Preceded by John M. Evans	Member of the U.S. House of Representatives from Montana's 1st congressional district March 4, 1933 – January 3, 1937	Succeeded by Jerry J. O'Connell
