= Wellington D. Rankin =

American politician

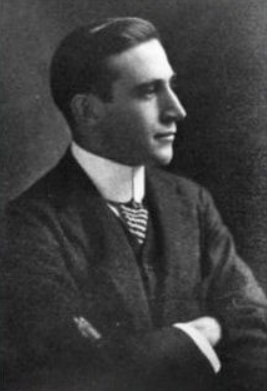

United States Attorney for the District of Montana
- In office 1926–1934
- President: Calvin Coolidge; Herbert Hoover; Franklin D. Roosevelt

Associate Justice of the Montana Supreme Court
- In office 1924–1925
- Preceded by: Charles H. Cooper
- Succeeded by: John A. Matthews

Attorney General of Montana
- In office January 3, 1921 – August 30, 1924
- Governor: Joseph M. Dixon
- Preceded by: Sam C. Ford
- Succeeded by: L. A. Foot

Personal details
- Born: Wellington Duncan Rankin; September 16, 1884 Missoula, Territory of Montana
- Died: June 4, 1966 (aged 81)
- Party: Republican
- Relations: Jeannette Rankin (sister); Edna Rankin McKinnon (sister)
- Education: Harvard University; Harvard Law School
- Occupation: Attorney

Wellington D. Rankin (September 16, 1884 – June 4, 1966) was a Republican public official from the state of Montana.

He was born Wellington Duncan Rankin on September 16, 1884 in Missoula, Montana, the son of John and Olive (née Pickering) Rankin. He grew up in a political family, with several of his relatives holding public office. He attended Harvard University, earning his bachelor's degree in 1905, and Harvard Law School, graduating in 1909. He was a Rhodes Scholar.

An attorney by profession, he served in the United States Army during World War I. He was elected Montana Attorney General in 1920, and unsuccessfully stood for the Republican Senate nomination in 1924. A few days after losing the Senate primary, Rankin was appointed to fill a vacancy as an associate justice of the Montana Supreme Court, a position he held until the end of 1925. He resigned that post to accept an appointment from President Calvin Coolidge as U.S. Attorney for the District of Montana (i.e. the entire state). Rankin was the unsuccessful Republican nominee for governor in 1928, but continued as U.S. Attorney; he was re-appointed to that post by President Herbert Hoover in 1930 and served until 1934. He returned to practicing law until 1942, when he ran for the U.S. Senate against liberal incumbent Democrat James Edward Murray. He lost to Murray by a vote of 83,673 to 82,461. In 1952, he ran for the House seat being vacated by Mike Mansfield, losing to Democrat Lee Metcalf by a vote of 55,679 to 54,086 (50.3%-48.9%).

Wellington Rankin's older sister, Jeannette Rankin, was the first woman ever elected to the United States Congress. She was elected U.S. Representative in 1916 and again in 1940. A lifelong pacifist, she was one of 50 House members (total of 56 in both chambers) who opposed the war declaration of 1917, and she was the only member of Congress to vote against declaring war on Japan after the attack on Pearl Harbor in 1941. Her vote against the United States entering World War II was highly unpopular, and resulted in her retirement.

Party political offices
| Preceded by Joseph M. Dixon | Republican nominee for Governor of Montana; 1928 | Succeeded by Frank A. Hazelbaker |
| Preceded by Thomas Larson | Republican nominee for U.S. Senator from Montana (Class 2); 1942 | Succeeded by Tom J. Davis |
Legal offices
| Preceded by S.C. Ford | Attorney General of Montana; 1921–1924 | Succeeded by L.A. Foot |
