= 1934 United States Senate special election in Montana =

- November 6, 1934
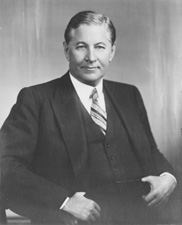

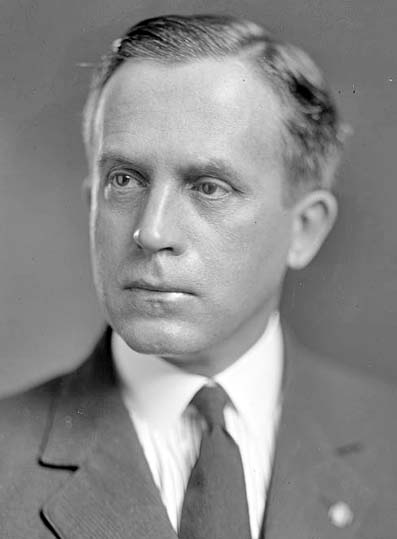
Nominee	James E. Murray	Scott Leavitt
Party	Democratic	Republican
Popular vote	116,965	77,307
Percentage	59.66%	39.43%
- County results Murray: 40–50% 50–60% 60–70% 70–80% Leavitt: 50–60% No data
U.S. senator before election
John E. Erickson
Democratic
Elected U.S. Senator
James E. Murray
Democratic

The 1934 United States Senate special election in Montana took place on November 6, 1934. Incumbent United States Senator John E. Erickson, who, as governor, had appointed himself to the seat in 1933 upon the death of Thomas J. Walsh, ran for re-election. However, he was defeated in the Democratic primary by James E. Murray, who was the former Silver Bow County Attorney and the Chairman of the State Advisory Board of the Public Works Administration. In the general election, Murray defeated Scott Leavitt, a former United States Congressman who had represented Montana's 2nd congressional district, and an independent candidate in a landslide to win his first term in the Senate.

== Democratic primary ==
=== Candidates ===
- James E. Murray, Chairman of the State Advisory Board of the Public Works Administration, former Silver Bow County Attorney
- James F. O'Connor, former Speaker of the Montana House of Representatives
- John E. Erickson, incumbent United States Senator
- Louis P. Donovan
- John A. Lovelace
- W. W. Hamilton

=== Results ===
Democratic Party primary results
Party	Candidate	Votes	%
Democratic	James E. Murray	19,640	24.89%
Democratic	James F. O'Connor	18,194	23.05%
Democratic	John E. Erickson (incumbent)	17,440	22.10%
Democratic	Louis P. Donovan	10,212	12.94%
Democratic	John A. Lovelace	8,649	10.96%
Democratic	W. W. Hamilton	4,788	6.07%
Total votes		78,923	100.00%

== Republican primary ==
=== Candidates ===
- Scott Leavitt, former United States Congressman from Montana's 2nd congressional district
- Wellington D. Rankin, former United States Attorney for the District of Montana, former Attorney General of Montana
- Leonard C. Young
- James A. Jergenson

=== Results ===
Republican Primary results
Party	Candidate	Votes	%
Republican	Scott Leavitt	25,479	47.03%
Republican	Wellington D. Rankin	18,150	33.50%
Republican	Leonard C. Young	6,202	11.45%
Republican	James A. Jergenson	4,344	8.02%
Total votes		54,175	100.00%

== General election ==
=== Results ===
United States Senate special election in Montana, 1934
Party	Candidate	Votes	%	±%
Democratic	James E. Murray	116,965	59.66%	−0.67%
Republican	Scott Leavitt	77,307	39.43%	+1.56%
Socialist	John F. Duffy	1,779	0.91%	+0.34%
Majority		39,658	20.23%	−2.22%
Turnout		196,051		
Democratic hold		Swing		
