= James E. Murray =

American lawyer

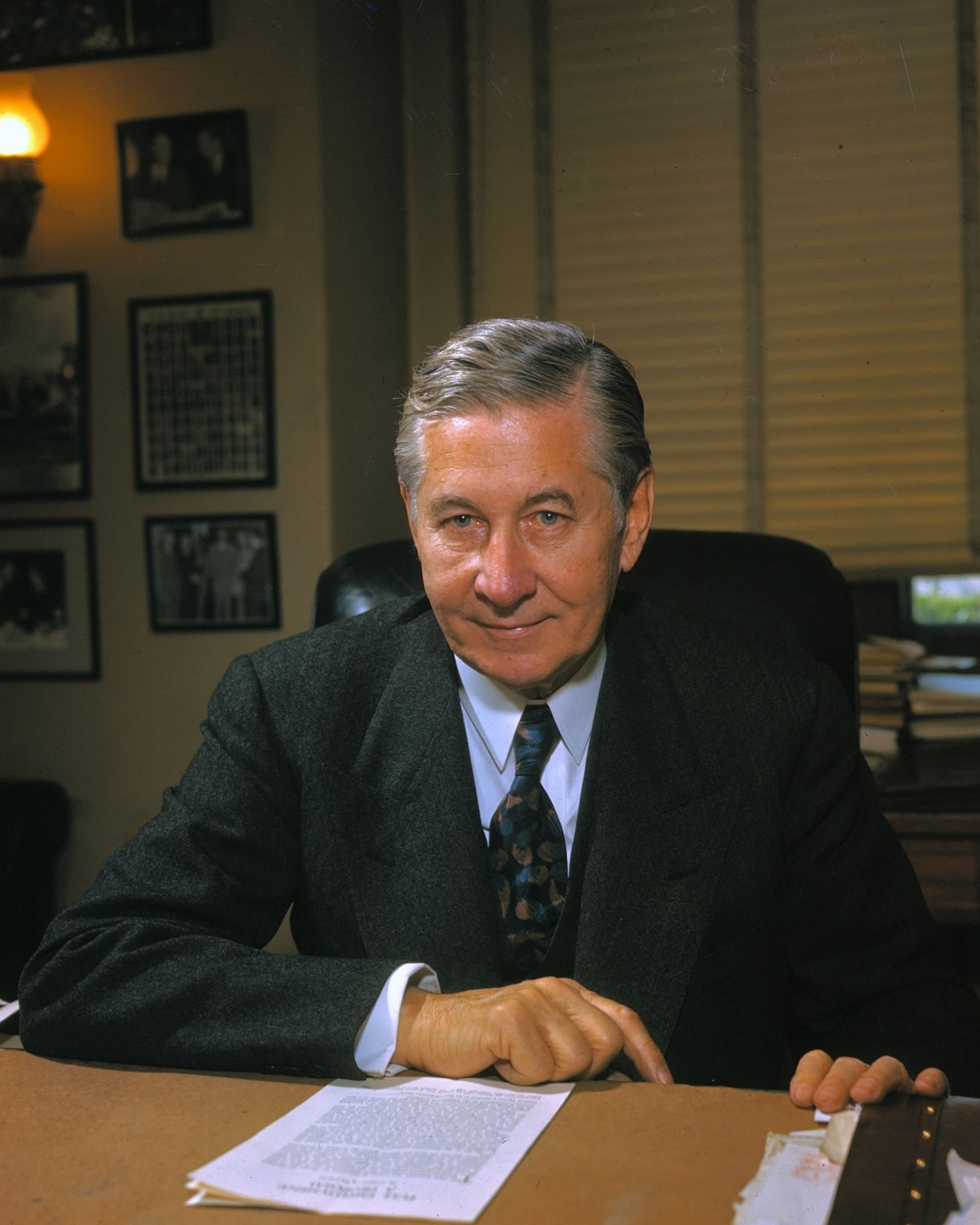
- Murray in 1949

United States Senator from Montana
- In office November 7, 1934 – January 3, 1961
- Preceded by: John E. Erickson
- Succeeded by: Lee Metcalf

Personal details
- Born: James Edward Murray; May 3, 1876 St. Thomas, Ontario, Canada
- Died: March 23, 1961 (aged 84) Butte, Montana, U.S.
- Party: Democratic
- Spouse: Viola Edna Horgan
- Children: William Daniel Murray
- Education: New York University (LLB)

James Edward Murray (May 3, 1876 – March 23, 1961) was an American politician and United States senator from Montana, and a liberal leader of the Democratic Party. He served in the United States Senate from 1934 until 1961.

== Background ==
Born on a farm near St. Thomas, Ontario, Canada, Murray graduated from St. Jerome's College in Berlin, Ontario, in 1897. That same year his father died and he went to live with a wealthy uncle in Butte, Montana, James Andrew Murray, who owned valuable copper mines. His uncle sent him to New York to study law. He graduated from the law department of New York University in 1900, the same year he became an American citizen. He was admitted to the bar in 1901, and commenced practice in Butte, where he also engaged in banking and the management of his uncle's properties.

He practiced law in Butte and in 1906 was elected to one term as Silver Bow County attorney. Murray feuded with local officials and judges, and returned to private practice. Active in the Democratic Party, Murray worked closely with labor unions to build his political base. In 1921, he and his mother inherited over $10 million from his late uncle. He dabbled in Irish politics, and reentered Montana politics when the Great Depression soured the Montana economy in the 1930s.

Until 1987, his family owned The Murray Hotel in Livingston, Montana's downtown historic district.

== Political career ==
Murray was county attorney of Silver Bow County, Montana, from 1906 to 1908, and became chairman of the State advisory board of the Public Works Administration from 1933 to 1934.

When Senator Thomas Walsh died in 1933, Democratic Governor John E. Erickson resigned and had himself appointed to the seat, despite his weak political base. Murray defeated Erickson in the 1934 special primary for the remainder of Walsh's term, and won the special general election that November; he was elected on the platform of "one hundred per-cent support" of President Franklin D. Roosevelt. Murray was elected to a full term in 1936, and re-elected in 1942, 1948 and 1954.

Murray was a staunch liberal and aggressive supporter of the New Deal Coalition. He broke with Montana's senior senator, Burton K. Wheeler, when Murray backed Roosevelt's attempt to pack the Supreme Court in 1937; unlike Wheeler, Murray gave up his isolationism in foreign affairs, and backed Roosevelt's aggressive foreign policy against Germany and Japan in 1939-1941.

In April 1943 a confidential analysis of the Senate Foreign Relations Committee by British scholar Isaiah Berlin for the British Foreign Office succinctly characterized Murray as:

a millionaire lawyer who tries to out-do [Burton K. ] Wheeler as a champion of small business and labour against big business monopoly (e.g., the Anaconda Company which dominates his copper-producing State). An advocate of the second front and of stronger ties with Britain. A free trader except on copper issues. A Roman Catholic.

In February 1944, Murray joined with Democratic Senator Walter F. George of Georgia to introduce an industrial demobilization bill to Congress. The bill supported plans for terminating war contracts and the disposal of surplus government property. The bill was passed on May 4.

Senator Murray worked closely with President Roosevelt to enact the president's Second Bill of Rights. President Roosevelt detailed significant numbers of Executive Branch staff to Murray's committees that were working on the president's agenda. Congressional backlash to this tactic is credited as part of the motivation to pass the Legislative Reorganization Act of 1946.

After the war, conservatives controlled Congress, so Murray had little success with his proposals to expand Social Security, provide free medical care for the aged, expand federal aid to education, or create a Missouri Valley Authority with the federal control over Montana's water resources patterned after the Tennessee Valley Authority. Instead, Congress adopted the Pick-Sloan Plan with flood control by the Army Corps of Engineers, the Bureau of Reclamation, and private development.

As Chairman of the Interior and Insular Affairs Committee in the 1950s, Murray was more successful in promoting federal development of hydroelectric power through large dams throughout the West. He used his chairmanship of the Senate's Interior Committee to secure Western water projects that led to congressional approval and funding for large dams in Montana at Canyon Ferry on the Missouri River, Yellowtail on the Bighorn River, Hungry Horse on the Flathead River, and Libby on the Kootenai River.

== Chairmanships ==
Murray served as chairman of the Committee on Education and Labor, co-chairman of the Joint Committee on Labor-Management Relations, chairman of the Committee on Labor and Public Welfare, and also served on the Committee on Interior and Insular Affairs.

== Health ==
In his later years, Murray was reported to have suffered from senility and his son, running his office for him in the 1950s, told him how to vote. He did not seek re-election in 1960.

Murray died in Butte less than three months after leaving office and was interred in Holy Cross Cemetery.

Party political offices
Preceded by Thomas J. Walsh	Democratic nominee for U.S. Senator from Montana (Class 2); 1934, 1936, 1942, 1948, 1954	Succeeded by Lee Metcalf
U.S. Senate
Preceded by John Edward Erickson	U.S. senator (Class 2) from Montana; 1934 – 1961; Served alongside: Burton K. Wheeler, Zales Ecton, Mike Mansfield	Succeeded by Lee Metcalf
Political offices
Preceded by Elbert D. Thomas	Chairman of the Senate Labor and Public Welfare Committee; 1951 – 1953	Succeeded by Howard Alexander Smith
Preceded by Guy Cordon	Chairman of the Senate Interior and Insular Affairs Committee; 1955 – 1961	Succeeded by Clinton Presba Anderson
