= First ladies and gentlemen of Montana =

First Lady of Montana
- Seal of Montana
- Current; Susan Gianforte since January 4, 2021
- Style: Mrs. Gianforte; Madam First Lady
- Residence: Governor's Mansion
- Inaugural holder: Lily Rosecrans Toole (as first lady); Harry Martz (as first gentleman)
- Formation: November 8, 1889 (136 years ago)

First lady or first gentleman of Montana is the honorary title traditionally given to the spouse of the governor of Montana. The holder of the title resides with the governor at the Montana Governor's Residence in Helena, Montana.

The current first lady of Montana is Susan Gianforte, wife of Governor Greg Gianforte, who assumed the role on January 4, 2021. To date, only one person has served as the first gentleman since statehood: Harry Martz from 2001 to 2005.

== List of first ladies and gentlemen ==
First Lady/Gentleman	Start term	End term	Governor
Susan Gianforte	January 4, 2021	Current	Greg Gianforte
Lisa Downs Bullock	2013	January 4, 2021	Steve Bullock
Nancy Hupp Schweitzer	2005	2013	Brian Schweitzer
Harry Martz	2001	2005	Judy Martz
Theresa Barber Racicot	1993	2001	Marc Racicot
Ann Hanson Stephens	1989	1993	Stan Stephens
Jean Schwinden	1981	1989	Ted Schwinden
Carol Ann Anderson Judge	1973	1980	Thomas Lee Judge
Margaret Evelyn Samson Anderson	1969	1973	Forrest H. Anderson
Betty Lee Babcock	1962	1969	Tim Babcock
Maxine Trotter Nutter	1961	1962	Donald Grant Nutter
Rose McClure Aronson	1953	1961	J. Hugo Aronson
Josephine A. Martin Bonner	1949	1953	John W. Bonner
Mary Leslie Shobe Ford	1941	1949	Sam C. Ford
Ellen Simpson Ayers	1937	1941	Roy E. Ayers
Lora Howe Holt	1935	1937	Elmer Holt
Emma May Poindexter Cooney	1933	1935	Frank Henry Cooney
Grace Vance Erickson	1925	1933	John E. Erickson
Caroline M. Worden Dixon	1921	1929	Joseph M. Dixon
Stella Baker Stewart	1913	1921	Sam V. Stewart
Elizabeth June Wilkins Norris	1908	1913	Edwin L. Norris
Catherine Crossland Smith	1897	1901	Robert Burns Smith
Lizzie M. Wilson	1893	1897	John E. Rickards
Lily Rosecrans Toole	1889, 1901	1893, 1908	Joseph Toole

== See also ==
- List of governors of Montana
- List of current United States first spouses
