= 1960 Montana gubernatorial election =

- November 8, 1960
- Turnout: 85.70%▲2.50
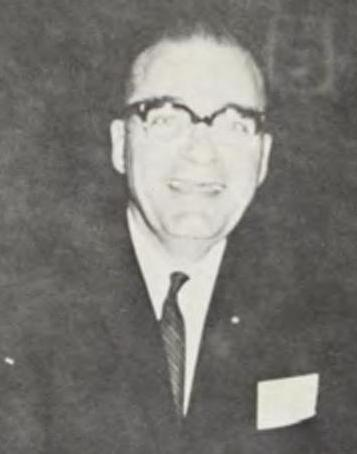

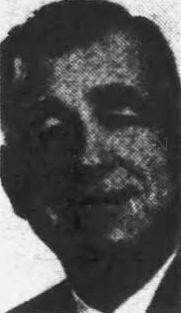
| Nominee | Donald Grant Nutter | Paul C. Cannon |
| Party | Republican | Democratic |
| Popular vote | 154,230 | 125,651 |
| Percentage | 55.11% | 44.89% |
- County results Nutter: 50–60% 60–70% 70–80% Cannon: 50–60% 60–70%
Governor before election
J. Hugo Aronson
Republican
Elected Governor
Donald Grant Nutter
Republican

The 1960 Montana gubernatorial election took place on November 8, 1960. Incumbent governor of Montana J. Hugo Aronson, who was first elected governor in 1952 and was re-elected in 1956, declined to run for re-election. Donald Grant Nutter, a former state senator, narrowly won the Republican primary, and advanced to the general election, where he was opposed by Paul Cannon, the Lieutenant Governor of Montana and the Democratic nominee. Nutter defeated Cannon by a fairly wide margin, winning his only term as governor, as he would die just a year into his term.

== Democratic primary ==
=== Candidates ===
- Paul Cannon, Lieutenant Governor of Montana
- Jack Toole, former chairman of the Montana Democratic Party
- Mike Kuchera, furniture dealer
- Willard E. Fraser, businessman
- John M. Nickey
- Merrill K. Riddick

=== Results ===
Democratic Party primary results
| Party | Candidate | Votes | % |
|---|---|---|---|
| Democratic | Paul Cannon | 44,690 | 34.89 |
| Democratic | Jack Toole | 40,537 | 31.65 |
| Democratic | Mike Kuchera | 33,216 | 25.93 |
| Democratic | Willard E. Fraser | 6,505 | 5.08 |
| Democratic | John M. Nickey | 1,806 | 1.41 |
| Democratic | Merrill K. Riddick | 1,344 | 1.05 |
| Total votes | | 128,098 | 100.00 |

== Republican primary ==
=== Candidates ===
- Donald Grant Nutter, Chairman of the Montana Republican Party, former State Senator
- Wesley A. D'Ewart, former United States Congressman from Montana's 2nd congressional district, 1954 Republican nominee for the United States Senate

=== Results ===
Republican Primary results
| Party | Candidate | Votes | % |
|---|---|---|---|
| Republican | Donald Grant Nutter | 33,099 | 50.43 |
| Republican | Wesley A. D'Ewart | 32,538 | 49.57 |
| Total votes | | 65,637 | 100.00 |

== General election ==
=== Results ===
Montana gubernatorial election, 1960
| Party | Candidate | Votes | % | ±% |
|---|---|---|---|---|
| Republican | Donald Grant Nutter | 154,230 | 55.11% | +3.74% |
| Democratic | Paul Cannon | 125,651 | 44.89% | −3.74% |
| Majority | | 28,579 | 10.21% | +7.48% |
| Turnout | | 279,881 | | |
| Republican hold | | Swing | | |
