= List of governors of Montana =

Governor of Montana
- State seal

- State flag

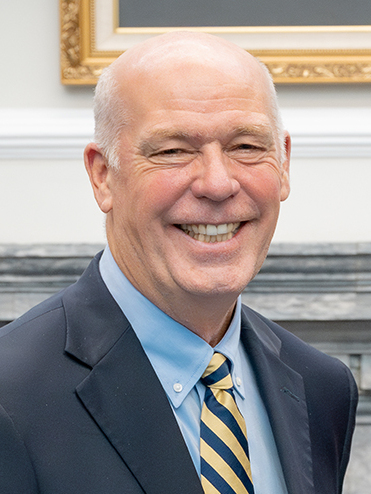
- Incumbent; Greg Gianforte since January 4, 2021
- Government of Montana
- Style: The Honorable
- Residence: Montana Governor's Residence
- Term length: Four years, renewable once (limited to eight years in a sixteen year period)
- Constituting instrument: Constitution of Montana
- Inaugural holder: Joseph Toole
- Formation: November 8, 1889 (137 years ago)
- Succession: Line of succession
- Deputy: Lieutenant Governor of Montana
- Salary: $118,387 (2022)
- Website: governor.mt.gov

The governor of Montana is the head of government of Montana and the commander-in-chief of the state's military forces. The governor has a duty to enforce state laws, the power to either approve or veto bills passed by the Montana State Legislature, to convene the legislature at any time, and to grant pardons and reprieves.

Montana has had twenty-four governors, consisting of nine Republicans and fifteen Democrats. The longest-serving governor was Joseph Toole, who served from 1889 to 1893 and again from 1901 until his resignation in 1908 with 11 years in office. He is the only governor to serve nonconsecutive terms. The shortest-serving governor was Elmer Holt, who served less than thirteen months when the previous governor died. The current governor is Republican Greg Gianforte, who took office on January 4, 2021.

== List of governors ==
=== Territory of Montana ===
Montana Territory was organized from Idaho Territory on May 26, 1864. During its 35-year history, it had nine governors appointed by the president of the United States, and three acting governors, all of whom had been appointed territorial secretary before becoming acting governor. The first, Thomas Francis Meagher, served as acting governor from 1865 until 1867. The second, James Tufts, served in for one month in 1869, and was succeeded by Wiley Scribner, who served 1869–1870.

Governors of the Territory of Montana
No.	Governor	Term in office (Note: The range given is from the date the governor was confirmed by the Senate, or appointed by the President during a Senate recess, to the date the governor's successor was confirmed, unless noted.)	Appointed by
1	Sidney Edgerton (1818–1900)	June 22, 1864 (Note: Edgerton was nominated on June 20, 1864, confirmed by the Senate on June 22, and arrived in the territory in July.) – July 13, 1866 (752 days; replaced) (Note: Edgerton left for Washington, D.C., in September 1865 to secure funding, but failed; he never formally resigned, but never returned to the territory. Territorial Secretary Thomas Francis Meagher acted as governor in the interim.)	Abraham Lincoln
2	Green C. Smith (1826–1895)	July 13, 1866 (Note: Smith was nominated on June 13, 1866; confirmed by the Senate on July 13; and arrived in the territory in October.) – April 9, 1869 (1002 days; resigned) (Note: Smith went east in July 1868 to secure funding, and never returned to the territory. The nomination of his successor notes that he resigned, but with no further details. Territorial Secretary James Tufts acted as governor in the interim.)	Andrew Johnson
3	James Mitchell Ashley (1824–1896)	April 9, 1869 (Note: Ashley was nominated on April 5, 1869; confirmed by the Senate on April 9; and arrived in the territory that summer.) – December 17, 1869 (253 days; removed) (Note: Grant removed Ashley from office abruptly and nominated his successor on December 17, 1869; the office would remain vacant for six months, during which time Territorial Secretary Wiley Scribner acted as governor. McMullin & Walker say Grant gave no reason, but contemporary news reports offer several reasons, ranging from general fitness for the job to accusations of criticizing Grant's policies.)	Ulysses S. Grant
4	Benjamin F. Potts (1836–1887)	July 13, 1870 (Note: Potts was nominated on December 17, 1869; confirmed by the Senate on July 13, 1870; and arrived in the territory on August 29. He was reconfirmed by the Senate on June 22, 1874, and June 14, 1878.) – August 4, 1882 (4406 days; replaced) (Note: Crosby, Potts' successor, was confirmed by the Senate on August 4, 1882, and Potts continued to serve as governor until Crosby arrived on January 15, 1883.)	Ulysses S. Grant
4	Benjamin F. Potts (1836–1887)	July 13, 1870 – August 4, 1882 (4406 days; replaced)	Rutherford B. Hayes
5	John Schuyler Crosby (1839–1914)	August 4, 1882 (Note: Crosby was nominated on July 26, 1882; confirmed by the Senate on August 4; and arrived in the territory on January 15, 1883.) – November 11, 1884 (831 days; resigned) (Note: Crosby resigned, having been appointed First Assistant United States Postmaster General.)	Chester A. Arthur
6	B. Platt Carpenter (1837–1921)	December 22, 1884 (Note: Carpenter was nominated on December 16, 1884; confirmed by the Senate on December 22; and arrived in the territory in January 1885.) – July 3, 1885 (194 days; removed) (Note: Carpenter was removed when Democrat Grover Cleveland succeeded Republican President Chester A. Arthur.)	Chester A. Arthur
7	Samuel Thomas Hauser (1833–1914)	May 14, 1886 (Note: Hauser was nominated on December 10, 1885, and confirmed by the Senate on May 14, 1886.) – January 13, 1887 (245 days; resigned) (Note: Hauser resigned in December 1886 to tend to his business interests. Leslie, Hauser's successor, was confirmed on January 13, 1887, and Hauser continued to serve as governor until Leslie arrived on February 8.)	Grover Cleveland
8	Preston Leslie (1819–1907)	January 13, 1887 (Note: Leslie was nominated on December 15, 1886; confirmed by the Senate on January 13, 1887; and sworn in February 8.) – March 27, 1889 (805 days; replaced)	Grover Cleveland
9	Benjamin F. White (1838–1920)	March 27, 1889 (Note: White was nominated on March 26, 1889, and confirmed on March 27.) – November 8, 1889 (227 days; statehood)	Benjamin Harrison

=== State of Montana ===
Montana was admitted to the Union on November 8, 1889.

The current Constitution of Montana, ratified in 1972, calls for a 4-year term for the governor, commencing on the first Monday in January following an election. A 1992 amendment limits the governor to 8 years in any 16-year period. The constitution provides for the election of a lieutenant governor for the same term as the governor. The two offices are elected on the same ticket; a provision which did not appear in the state's first constitution, ratified in 1889. In the event of a vacancy in the office of governor due to resignation, disqualification, or death, the lieutenant governor becomes governor for the remainder of the term. If the governor is unable to perform his duties for any other reason, the lieutenant governor may become acting governor at the discretion of the state legislature.

Governors of the State of Montana
No.	Governor	Term in office	Party	Election	Lt. Governor (Note: Lieutenant governors represented the same party as their governor unless noted.)
1	Joseph Toole (1851–1929)	November 8, 1889 – January 2, 1893 (1152 days; retired)	Democratic	1889	John E. Rickards (Note: Represented the Republican Party)
2	John E. Rickards (1848–1927)	January 2, 1893 – January 4, 1897 (1464 days; retired)	Republican	1892	Alexander Campbell Botkin
3	Robert Burns Smith (1854–1908)	January 4, 1897 – January 7, 1901 (1464 days; retired)	Fusion (Note: Smith represented both the Democratic and Populist parties, with Glashan labeling him only as a Populist.)	1896	Archibald E. Spriggs (Note: Represented the Populist Party)
4	Joseph Toole (1851–1929)	January 7, 1901 – April 1, 1908 (2642 days; resigned) (Note: Toole resigned due to health.)	Democratic	1900	Frank G. Higgins
4	Joseph Toole (1851–1929)	January 7, 1901 – April 1, 1908 (2642 days; resigned)	Democratic	1904	Edwin L. Norris
5	Edwin L. Norris (1865–1924)	April 1, 1908 – January 6, 1913 (1742 days; retired)	Democratic	Succeeded from lieutenant governor	Benjamin F. White
5	Edwin L. Norris (1865–1924)	April 1, 1908 – January 6, 1913 (1742 days; retired)	Democratic	1908	William Allen
6	Sam V. Stewart (1872–1939)	January 6, 1913 – January 3, 1921 (2920 days; retired)	Democratic	1912	W. W. McDowell
6	Sam V. Stewart (1872–1939)	January 6, 1913 – January 3, 1921 (2920 days; retired)	Democratic	1916	W. W. McDowell
7	Joseph M. Dixon (1867–1934)	January 3, 1921 – January 5, 1925 (1464 days; lost election)	Republican	1920	Nelson Story Jr.
8	John E. Erickson (1863–1946)	January 5, 1925 – March 13, 1933 (2990 days; resigned) (Note: Erickson resigned so that his successor would appoint him to the United States Senate.)	Democratic	1924	W. S. McCormack
8	John E. Erickson (1863–1946)	January 5, 1925 – March 13, 1933 (2990 days; resigned)	Democratic	1928	Frank A. Hazelbaker
8	John E. Erickson (1863–1946)	January 5, 1925 – March 13, 1933 (2990 days; resigned)	Democratic	1932	Frank Henry Cooney
9	Frank Henry Cooney (1872–1935)	March 13, 1933 – December 15, 1935 (1008 days; died in office)	Democratic	Succeeded from lieutenant governor	Tom Kane
9	Frank Henry Cooney (1872–1935)	March 13, 1933 – December 15, 1935 (1008 days; died in office)	Democratic	Succeeded from lieutenant governor	Ernest T. Eaton
9	Frank Henry Cooney (1872–1935)	March 13, 1933 – December 15, 1935 (1008 days; died in office)	Democratic	Succeeded from lieutenant governor	Elmer Holt
10	Elmer Holt (1884–1945)	December 15, 1935 – January 4, 1937 (387 days; lost nomination)	Democratic	Succeeded from president of the Senate	William P. Pilgeram
11	Roy E. Ayers (1882–1955)	January 4, 1937 – January 6, 1941 (1464 days; lost election)	Democratic	1936	Hugh R. Adair
12	Sam C. Ford (1882–1961)	January 6, 1941 – January 3, 1949 (2920 days; lost election)	Republican	1940	Ernest T. Eaton
12	Sam C. Ford (1882–1961)	January 6, 1941 – January 3, 1949 (2920 days; lost election)	Republican	1944	Ernest T. Eaton
13	John W. Bonner (1902–1970)	January 3, 1949 – January 5, 1953 (1464 days; lost election)	Democratic	1948	Paul C. Cannon
14	J. Hugo Aronson (1891–1978)	January 5, 1953 – January 2, 1961 (2920 days; retired)	Republican	1952	George M. Gosman
14	J. Hugo Aronson (1891–1978)	January 5, 1953 – January 2, 1961 (2920 days; retired)	Republican	1956	Paul C. Cannon (Note: Represented the Democratic Party)
15	Donald Grant Nutter (1915–1962)	January 2, 1961 – January 25, 1962 (389 days; died in office)	Republican	1960	Tim Babcock
16	Tim Babcock (1919–2015)	January 25, 1962 – January 6, 1969 (2539 days; lost election)	Republican	Succeeded from lieutenant governor	David F. James
16	Tim Babcock (1919–2015)	January 25, 1962 – January 6, 1969 (2539 days; lost election)	Republican	1964	Ted James
17	Forrest H. Anderson (1913–1989)	January 6, 1969 – January 1, 1973 (1457 days; retired)	Democratic	1968	Thomas Lee Judge
18	Thomas Lee Judge (1934–2006)	January 1, 1973 – January 5, 1981 (2927 days; lost nomination)	Democratic	1972	Bill Christiansen
18	Thomas Lee Judge (1934–2006)	January 1, 1973 – January 5, 1981 (2927 days; lost nomination)	Democratic	1976	Ted Schwinden
19	Ted Schwinden (1925–2023)	January 5, 1981 – January 2, 1989 (2920 days; retired)	Democratic	1980	George Turman
19	Ted Schwinden (1925–2023)	January 5, 1981 – January 2, 1989 (2920 days; retired)	Democratic	1984	George Turman
19	Ted Schwinden (1925–2023)	January 5, 1981 – January 2, 1989 (2920 days; retired)	Democratic	1984	Gordon McOmber
20	Stan Stephens (1929–2021)	January 2, 1989 – January 4, 1993 (1464 days; retired)	Republican	1988	Allen Kolstad
20	Stan Stephens (1929–2021)	January 2, 1989 – January 4, 1993 (1464 days; retired)	Republican	1988	Denny Rehberg
21	Marc Racicot (b. 1948)	January 4, 1993 – January 2, 2001 (2921 days; term-limited) (Note: Under a 1993 amendment to the constitution, governors are ineligible to serve more than 8 years in any 16 year period.)	Republican	1992	Denny Rehberg
21	Marc Racicot (b. 1948)	January 4, 1993 – January 2, 2001 (2921 days; term-limited)	Republican	1996	Judy Martz
22	Judy Martz (1943–2017)	January 2, 2001 – January 3, 2005 (1463 days; retired)	Republican	2000	Karl Ohs
23	Brian Schweitzer (b. 1955)	January 3, 2005 – January 7, 2013 (2927 days; term-limited)	Democratic	2004	John Bohlinger
23	Brian Schweitzer (b. 1955)	January 3, 2005 – January 7, 2013 (2927 days; term-limited)	Democratic	2008	John Bohlinger
24	Steve Bullock (b. 1966)	January 7, 2013 – January 4, 2021 (2920 days; term-limited) (Note: Bullock, being term-limited, had already lost election to the United States Senate when his term ended.)	Democratic	2012	John Walsh
24	Steve Bullock (b. 1966)	January 7, 2013 – January 4, 2021 (2920 days; term-limited)	Democratic	2012	Angela McLean
24	Steve Bullock (b. 1966)	January 7, 2013 – January 4, 2021 (2920 days; term-limited)	Democratic	2012	Mike Cooney
24	Steve Bullock (b. 1966)	January 7, 2013 – January 4, 2021 (2920 days; term-limited)	Democratic	2016	Mike Cooney
25	Greg Gianforte (b. 1961)	January 4, 2021 – Incumbent (Note: Gianforte's second term began on January 6, 2025, and will expire on January 1, 2029; he will be term-limited.) (in office 2149 days)	Republican	2020	Kristen Juras
25	Greg Gianforte (b. 1961)	January 4, 2021 – Incumbent (in office 2149 days)	Republican	2024	Kristen Juras

== Timelines ==
=== Lifespan timeline ===
Lifespans of Montana governors

=== Governor Timeline ===
Timeline of Montana governors

== Electoral history (1952–) ==
Year	Democratic nominee			Republican nominee			Independent candidate			Libertarian nominee			Green nominee		
Year	Candidate	#	%	Candidate	#	%	Candidate	#	%	Candidate	#	%	Candidate	#	%
1952	John W. Bonner	129,369	49.04%	J. Hugo Aronson	134,423	50.96%	–			–			–		
1956	Arnold Olsen	131,488	48.63%	J. Hugo Aronson	138,878	51.37%	–			–			–		
1960	Paul C. Cannon	125,651	44.89%	Donald G. Nutter	154,230	55.11%	–			–			–		
1964	Roland Renne	136,862	48.71%	Tim Babcock	144,113	51.29%	–			–			–		
1968	Forrest H. Anderson	150,481	54.11%	Tim Babcock	116,432	41.87%	Wayne Montgomery (New Reform)	11,199	4.03%	–			–		
1972	Thomas Lee Judge	172,523	54.12%	Ed Smith	146,231	45.88%	–			–			–		
1976	Thomas Lee Judge	195,420	61.70%	Bob Woodahl	115,848	36.58%	Charlie Mahoney	5,452	1.72%	–			–		
1980	Ted Schwinden	199,574	55.37%	Jack Ramirez	160,892	44.63%	–			–			–		
1984	Ted Schwinden	266,578	70.34%	Pat M. Goodover	100,070	26.41%	–			Larry Dodge	12,322	3.25%	–		
1988	Thomas Lee Judge	169,313	46.13%	Stan Stephens	190,604	51.93%	–			William Dee Morris	7,104	1.94%	–		
1992	Dorothy Bradley	198,421	48.65%	Marc Racicot	209,401	51.35%	–			–			–		
1996	Judy Jacobson	84,407	20.83%	Marc Racicot	320,768	79.17%	–			–			–		
2000	Mark O'Keefe	193,131	47.08%	Judy Martz	209,135	50.98%	–			Stan Jones	7,926	1.93%	–		
2004	Brian Schweitzer	225,016	50.44%	Bob Brown	205,313	46.02%	–			Stan Jones	7,424	1.66%	Bob Kelleher	8,393	1.88%
2008	Brian Schweitzer	318,670	65.47%	Roy Brown	158,268	32.52%	–			Stan Jones	9,976	2.01%	–		
2012	Steve Bullock	236,450	48.90%	Rick Hill	228,879	47.34%	–			Ron Vandevender	18,160	3.76%	–		
2016	Steve Bullock	255,933	50.25%	Greg Gianforte	236,115	46.35%	–			Ted Dunlap	17,312	3.40%	–		
2020	Mike Cooney	250,860	41.56%	Greg Gianforte	328,548	54.43%	–			Lyman Bishop	24,179	4.01%	–		
2024	Ryan Busse	232,644	38.62%	Greg Gianforte	354,569	58.86%	–			Kaiser Leib	15,191	2.52%	–		

== See also ==
- Gubernatorial lines of succession in the United States § Montana
- First ladies and gentlemen of Montana
- List of lieutenant governors of Montana
- List of Montana state legislatures

== Sources ==
- "Former Montana Governors". National Governors Association.
- "Montana Constitution". State Democracy Research Initiative. University of Wisconsin Law School.
- Glashan, Roy R. (1979). American Governors and Gubernatorial Elections, 1775-1978. Meckler Books. ISBN 0-7201-1511-6 – via Internet Archive.
- Kallenbach, Joseph E.; Kallenbach, Jessamine S. (1977). American State Governors, 1776-1976. Oceana Publications. ISBN 978-0-379-00665-0 – via Internet Archive.
- McMullin, Thomas A.; Walker, David (1984). Biographical Directory of American Territorial Governors. Meckler Publishing. ISBN 0-930466-11-X – via Internet Archive.
- Mullaney, Marie Marmo (1994). Biographical Directory of the Governors of the United States, 1988–1994. Greenwood Publishing Group. ISBN 0-313-28312-5 – via Internet Archive.
- Sobel, Robert; Raimo, John (1978). Biographical Directory of the Governors of the United States, 1789-1978. Vol. 3. Meckler Books. ISBN 0-930466-01-2 – via Internet Archive.
- Thorpe, Francis Newton, ed. (1909). The Federal and State Constitutions, Colonial Charters, and Other Organic Laws of the States, Territories, and Colonies Now or Heretofore Forming the United States of America. Vol. 4. United States Government Publishing Office – via Internet Archive.
