= 1936 Montana gubernatorial election =

- November 3, 1936
- Turnout: 79.80%▼1.80
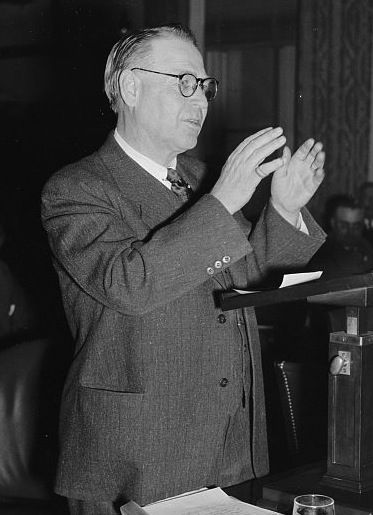

Nominee	Roy E. Ayers	Frank A. Hazelbaker
Party	Democratic	Republican
Popular vote	115,310	108,914
Percentage	50.94%	48.12%
- County results Ayers: 40–50% 50–60% 60–70% 70–80% Hazelbaker: 50–60% 60–70% 70–80%
Governor before election
Elmer Holt
Democratic
Elected Governor
Roy E. Ayers
Democratic

The 1936 Montana gubernatorial election took place on November 3, 1936. Incumbent Governor of Montana Elmer Holt, who became governor in 1935 upon the death of Frank Henry Cooney, ran for re-election. He was challenged in the Democratic primary by a number of challengers, and was narrowly defeated for renomination by United States Congressman Roy E. Ayers of Montana's 2nd congressional district. Ayers advanced to the general election, where he faced Frank A. Hazelbaker, the former Lieutenant Governor of Montana and the Republican nominee. Following a close election, Ayers narrowly defeated Hazelbaker to win what would be his first and only term as governor.

== Democratic primary ==
=== Candidates ===
- Roy E. Ayers, United States Congressman from Montana's 2nd congressional district
- Elmer Holt, incumbent Governor of Montana
- Miles Romney Sr., former State Senator, former Mayor of Hamilton
- H. L. Maury
- Frank F. Hayes

=== Results ===
Democratic Party primary results
Party	Candidate	Votes	%
Democratic	Roy E. Ayers	43,822	37.85
Democratic	Elmer Holt (incumbent)	39,397	34.02
Democratic	Miles Romney, Sr.	21,679	18.72
Democratic	H. L. Maury	9,086	7.85
Democratic	Frank F. Hayes	1,808	1.56
Total votes		115,792	100.00

== Republican primary ==
=== Candidates ===
- Frank A. Hazelbaker, former Lieutenant Governor of Montana, 1932 Republican nominee for Governor of Montana
- Robert Pauline, State Senator, former Mayor of Kalispell

=== Results ===
Republican Primary results
Party	Candidate	Votes	%
Republican	Frank A. Hazelbaker	28,970	72.44
Republican	Robert Pauline	11,019	27.56
Total votes		39,989	100.00

== General election ==
=== Results ===
Montana gubernatorial election, 1936
Party	Candidate	Votes	%	±%
Democratic	Roy E. Ayers	115,310	50.94%	+2.44%
Republican	Frank A. Hazelbaker	108,914	48.12%	+1.39%
Socialist	J. P. Cavanaugh	917	0.41%	−2.51%
Union	David J. Ryan	838	0.37%	+0.53%
Communist	Arvo Fredrickson	374	0.17%	−0.76%
Majority		6,396	2.83%	+1.05%
Turnout		226,353		
Democratic hold		Swing		
