= 1948 Montana gubernatorial election =

- November 2, 1948
- Turnout: 81.90%▲2.50
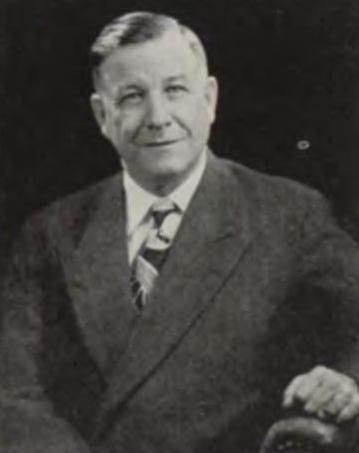

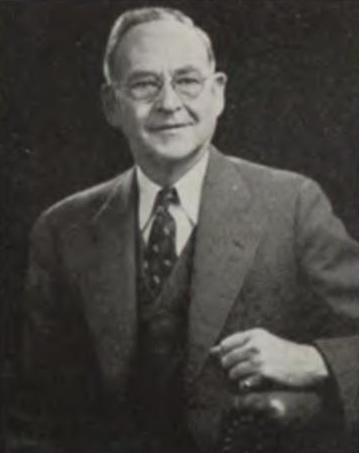
Nominee	John W. Bonner	Sam C. Ford
Party	Democratic	Republican
Popular vote	124,267	97,792
Percentage	55.73%	43.86%
- County results Bonner: 50–60% 60–70% 70–80% Ford: 50–60% 60–70%
Governor before election
Sam C. Ford
Republican
Elected Governor
John W. Bonner
Democratic

The 1948 Montana gubernatorial election took place on November 2, 1948. Incumbent Governor of Montana Sam C. Ford, who was first elected Governor in 1940 and was re-elected in 1944, ran for re-election. He won the Republican primary and advanced to the general election, where he faced John W. Bonner, the former Attorney General of Montana and the Democratic nominee. Ultimately, Bonner defeated Ford handily in his bid for re-election, winning his first and only term as governor.

== Democratic primary ==
=== Candidates ===
- John W. Bonner, former Attorney General of Montana
- Arthur F. Lamey, former chairman of the Montana Democratic Party
- Leif Erickson, former Chief Justice of the Montana Supreme Court, 1946 Democratic nominee for the United States Senate, 1944 Democratic nominee for Governor of Montana
- Vernon Hoven
- George M. Melton

=== Results ===
Democratic Party primary results
Party	Candidate	Votes	%
Democratic	John W. Bonner	29,514	37.32
Democratic	Arthur F. Lamey	23,214	29.36
Democratic	Leif Erickson	18,478	23.37
Democratic	Vernon Hoven	3,990	5.05
Democratic	George M. Melton	3,879	4.91
Total votes		79,075	100.00

== Republican primary ==
=== Candidates ===
- Sam C. Ford, incumbent Governor of Montana
- Leonard C. Young
- Mike Kuchera, furniture dealer

=== Results ===
Republican Primary results
Party	Candidate	Votes	%
Republican	Sam C. Ford (incumbent)	41,493	72.38
Republican	Leonard C. Young	11,023	19.23
Republican	Mike Kuchera	4,811	8.39
Total votes		57,327	100.00

== General election ==
=== Results ===
Montana gubernatorial election, 1948
Party	Candidate	Votes	%	±%
Democratic	John W. Bonner	124,267	55.73%	+12.56%
Republican	Sam C. Ford (incumbent)	97,792	43.86%	−12.50%
Socialist	Leverne Hamilton	905	0.41%	
Majority		26,475	11.87%	−1.31%
Turnout		222,964		
Democratic gain from Republican		Swing		
