= Leif Erickson (politician) =

American judge

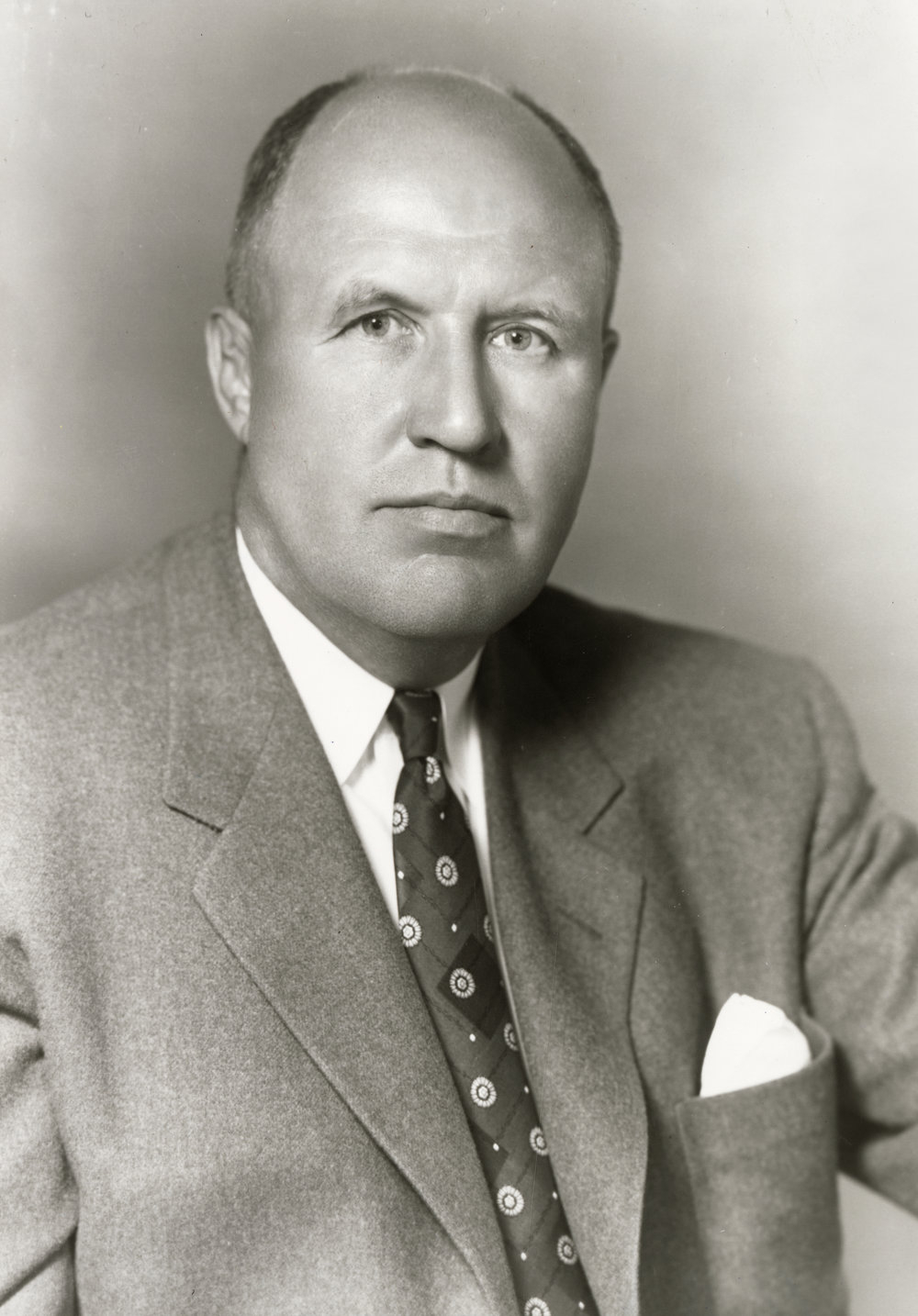
- Portrait by Clarence DeWalt c. 1962

Chair of the Montana Democratic Party
- In office 1956–1958

Associate Justice of the Montana Supreme Court
- In office 1939–1945

District Attorney of Richland County
- In office 1936–1938

Personal details
- Born: Leif Erickson; July 29, 1906 Cashton, Wisconsin, U.S.
- Died: December 22, 1998 (aged 92) Missoula, Montana, U.S.
- Party: Democratic
- Education: University of North Dakota; University of Chicago

Leif Erickson (July 29, 1906 – December 22, 1998) was an American attorney who served as an associate justice of the Montana Supreme Court from 1939 to 1945.

== Biography ==
Erickson was born in Cashton, Wisconsin. He was one of seven children of Oluf Erickson (1874 – 1963) and Dora B. Erickson (1876 – 1974). The family later moved to western North Dakota. Erickson attended high school in Sidney, Montana, attended the University of North Dakota and graduated from University of Chicago Law School, where he earned his J.D. degree in 1934. On December 29, 1932, he married Huberta Burton Brown. He died in Missoula, Montana.

== Career ==
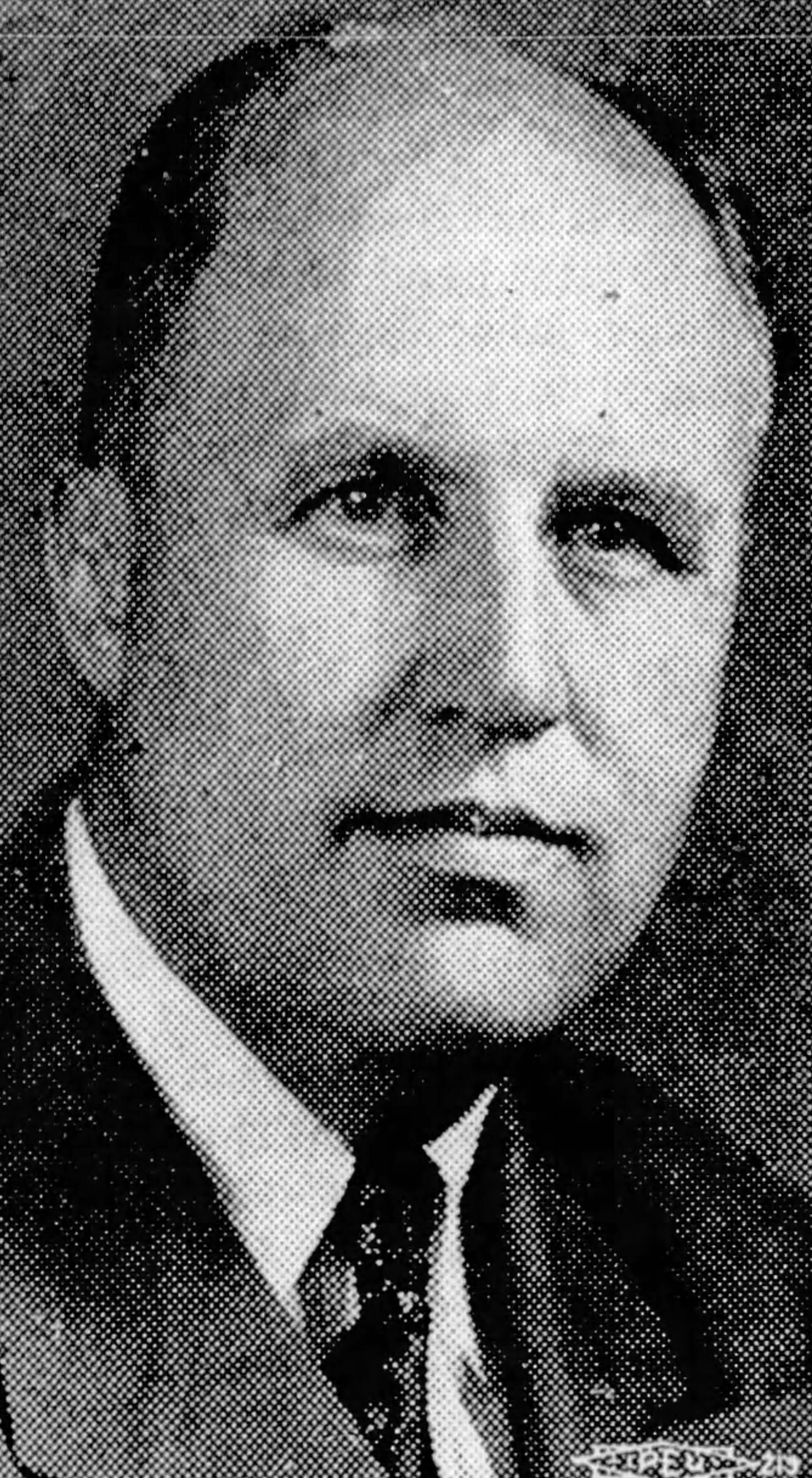
Erickson c. 1948

Erickson was Richland County District Attorney from 1936 to 1938 and was an Associate justice of the Montana Supreme Court from 1939 to 1945. He was a delegate to the Democratic National Conventions in 1948, 1952, and 1956. In 1944, he ran for Governor of Montana, winning the Democratic primary and advancing to the general election, where he opposed incumbent Republican Sam C. Ford. Ford defeated Erickson by a wide margin to win his second term as governor. Erickson challenged incumbent Burton K. Wheeler in the Democratic primary in 1946, defeating Wheeler in an upset, before losing the general election to Republican State Senator Zales Ecton. He ran for governor once more in 1948, but finished third in the Democratic primary behind former Montana Attorney General John W. Bonner and Arthur Lamey. From 1956 to 1958 he was chairman of the Montana Democratic Party and from 1962 to 1973 he was a member of the Democratic National Committee.

Political offices
Preceded by Sam V. Stewart	Justice of the Montana Supreme Court; 1939–1945	Succeeded by Edwin K. Cheadle
Party political offices
Preceded by Roy E. Ayers	Democratic nominee for Governor of Montana; 1944	Succeeded by John W. Bonner
Preceded by Burton K. Wheeler	Democratic nominee for U.S. Senator from Montana (Class 1); 1946	Succeeded by Mike Mansfield
