= List of lieutenant governors of Montana =

Elected official in the United States

Lieutenant Governor of Montana
- Seal of the State of Montana

- Flag of the State of Montana

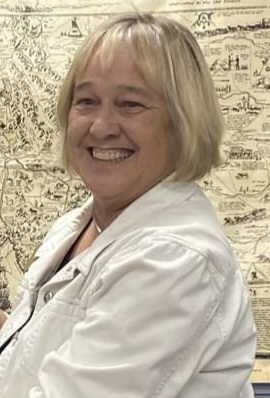
- Incumbent; Kristen Juras since January 4, 2021
- Government of Montana
- Member of: Montana Executive Branch
- Residence: None official
- Seat: Helena, Montana
- Appointer: Direct election
- Term length: Four years, renewable once in a 16 year period
- Constituting instrument: Constitution of Montana
- Inaugural holder: John E. Rickards
- Formation: 1889
- Succession: First (gubernatorial line of succession)
- Salary: $90,140 (per year)

The lieutenant governor of Montana is an elected official in the State of Montana that ranks just below the governor of Montana.

== List of lieutenant governors ==
Parties

Democratic (17) Republican (18) Populist (1)

#	Portrait	Lieutenant Governor	Term in office	Party	Governor(s)
1		John E. Rickards	1889–1893	Republican	Joseph Toole (D)
2		Alexander Campbell Botkin	1893–1897	Republican	John E. Rickards (R)
3		Archibald E. Spriggs	1897–1901	Populist	Robert Burns Smith (D)
4		Frank G. Higgins	1901–1905	Democratic	Joseph Toole (D)
5		Edwin L. Norris	1905–1908	Democratic	Joseph Toole (D)
–		Benjamin F. White	1908–1909	Republican	Edwin L. Norris (D)
6		William R. Allen	1909–1913	Republican	Edwin L. Norris (D)
7		W.W. McDowell	1913–1921	Democratic	Sam V. Stewart (D)
8		Nelson Story, Jr.	1921–1925	Republican	Joseph M. Dixon (R)
9		W.S. McCormack	1925–1929	Republican	John E. Erickson (D)
10		Frank A. Hazelbaker	1929–1933	Republican	John E. Erickson (D)
11		Frank Henry Cooney	1933	Democratic	John E. Erickson (D)
12		Tom Kane	1933–1934	Republican	Frank H. Cooney (D)
13		Ernest T. Eaton	1934–1935	Republican	Frank H. Cooney (D)
14		Elmer Holt	1935	Democratic	Frank H. Cooney (D)
15		William P. Pilgeram	1935–1937	Democratic	Elmer Holt (D)
16		Hugh R. Adair	1937–1941	Democratic	Roy E. Ayers (D)
17		Ernest T. Eaton	1941–1949	Republican	Sam C. Ford (R)
18		Paul C. Cannon	1949–1953	Democratic	John W. Bonner (D)
19		George M. Gosman	1953–1957	Republican	J. Hugo Aronson (R)
20		Paul C. Cannon	1957–1961	Democratic	J. Hugo Aronson (R)
21		Tim Babcock	1961–1962	Republican	Donald G. Nutter (R)
22		David F. James	1962–1965	Democratic	Tim Babcock (R)
23		Ted James	1965–1969	Republican	Tim Babcock (R)
24		Thomas Lee Judge	1969–1973	Democratic	Forrest H. Anderson (D)
25		Bill Christiansen	1973–1977	Democratic	Thomas L. Judge (D)
26		Ted Schwinden	1977–1981	Democratic	Thomas L. Judge (D)
27		George Turman	1981–1988	Democratic	Ted Schwinden (D)
28		Gordon McOmber	1988–1989	Democratic	Ted Schwinden (D)
29		Allen Kolstad	1989–1991	Republican	Stan Stephens (R)
30		Denny Rehberg	1991–1997	Republican	Stan Stephens (R); Marc Racicot (R)
31		Judy Martz	1997–2001	Republican	Marc Racicot (R)
32		Karl Ohs	2001–2005	Republican	Judy Martz (R)
33		John Bohlinger	2005–2013	Republican	Brian Schweitzer (D)
34		John Walsh	2013–2014	Democratic	Steve Bullock (D)
35		Angela McLean	2014–2016	Democratic	Steve Bullock (D)
36		Mike Cooney	2016–2021	Democratic	Steve Bullock (D)
37		Kristen Juras	2021–present	Republican	Greg Gianforte (R)
