= Paul C. Cannon =

American politician from Montana

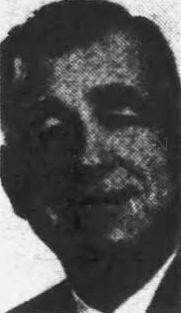

18th and 20th Lieutenant Governor of Montana
- In office January 3, 1949 – January 5, 1953
- Governor: John W. Bonner
- Preceded by: Ernest T. Eaton
- Succeeded by: George M. Gosman
- In office January 7, 1957 – January 2, 1961
- Governor: J. Hugo Aronson
- Preceded by: George M. Gosman
- Succeeded by: Tim Babcock

Member of the Montana House of Representatives
- In office January 2, 1939 – January 1, 1945

Personal details
- Born: Paul C. Cannon; May 9, 1896 Sunnyside, Washington, United States
- Died: November 3, 1986 (aged 90) Fort Harrison, Montana, United States
- Resting place: Forestvale Cemetery, Helena, Montana, United States
- Party: Democratic
- Spouse: Caroline Duffes

Military service
- Branch/service: United States Army
- Rank: Private
- Unit: United States Army Medical Corps
- Battles/wars: World War I

Paul C. Cannon (May 9, 1896 – November 3, 1986) was an American businessman and Democratic Party politician who served as the 18th and 20th lieutenant governor of Montana from 1949 to 1953 and again from 1957 to 1961. He was also the Democratic nominee for governor of Montana in 1960, but lost to Republican Donald G. Nutter.

== Early life ==
Paul C. Cannon was born on May 9, 1896, to Miles and Mary Erickson Cannon in Sunnyside, Washington, and attended school in Yakima, Washington. Shortly after graduation, he enlisted in the United States Army, serving in the United States Army Medical Corps during World War I. After his discharge from the military, Cannon moved to Butte, Montana, where he opened a men's clothing business and later a women's clothing business called Cannon's. He also met his eventual wife, Caroline Duffes, and the two married in Salt Lake City, Utah, on May 25, 1923.

== Political career ==
Cannon's first foray into politics was his three-term stint in the Montana House of Representatives from 1939 to 1945, during which he served as Speaker pro Tempore and Democratic floor leader of that legislative body. He also served as a delegate to the Democratic National Convention from Montana in 1940, 1944, 1948, 1952, and 1956. He was also elected to the Montana lieutenant governorship twice, serving under Governors John W. Bonner and J. Hugo Aronson. During Cannon's second tenure as lieutenant governor, Governor Aronson rarely left the state because of his deep distrust for Cannon, a fact Aronson disclosed privately to fellow Montana Republican Bob Brown after he left office.

Cannon was nominated by the Montana Democratic Party to be their gubernatorial candidate in 1960, but he lost the election to Republican State Senator Donald G. Nutter.

== Later life and death ==
After losing the 1960 election, Cannon returned to private life in Montana. He died on November 3, 1986, at 90 years old.
