= 1956 Montana gubernatorial election =

- November 6, 1956
- Turnout: 83.20%▼2.50
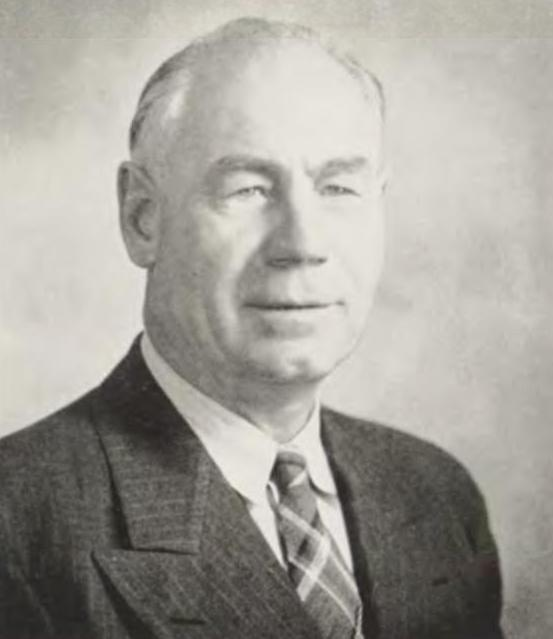

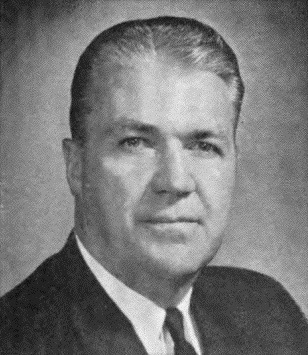
Nominee	J. Hugo Aronson	Arnold Olsen
Party	Republican	Democratic
Popular vote	138,878	131,488
Percentage	51.37%	48.63%
- County results Aronson: 50–60% 60–70% Olsen: 50–60% 60–70% 70–80%
Governor before election
J. Hugo Aronson
Republican
Elected Governor
J. Hugo Aronson
Republican

The 1956 Montana gubernatorial election took place on November 6, 1956. Incumbent governor of Montana J. Hugo Aronson, who was first elected Governor in 1952, ran for re-election. He was unopposed in the Republican primary and advanced to the general election, where he faced Arnold Olsen, the Attorney General of Montana and the Democratic nominee. Despite the fact that then-President Dwight D. Eisenhower won the state in a landslide that year in the presidential election, Aronson only narrowly defeated Arnold to win his second and final term as governor.

== Democratic primary ==
=== Candidates ===
- Arnold Olsen, Attorney General of Montana
- John W. Bonner, former governor of Montana
- Danny O'Neill, livestock man
- J. M. Nickey

=== Results ===
Democratic Party primary results
Party	Candidate	Votes	%
Democratic	Arnold Olsen	55,269	44.94
Democratic	John W. Bonner	51,306	41.72
Democratic	Danny O'Neill	14,777	12.01
Democratic	J. M. Nickey	1,639	1.33
Total votes		122,991	100.00

== Republican primary ==
=== Candidates ===
- J. Hugo Aronson, incumbent governor of Montana

=== Results ===
Republican Primary results
Party	Candidate	Votes	%
Republican	J. Hugo Aronson (incumbent)	50,444	100.00
Total votes		50,444	100.00

== General election ==
=== Results ===
Montana gubernatorial election, 1956
Party	Candidate	Votes	%	±%
Republican	J. Hugo Aronson (incumbent)	138,878	51.37%	+0.41%
Democratic	Arnold Olsen	131,488	48.63%	−0.41%
Majority		7,390	2.73%	+0.82%
Turnout		270,366		
Republican hold		Swing		
