= Joseph Poindexter =

American lawyer

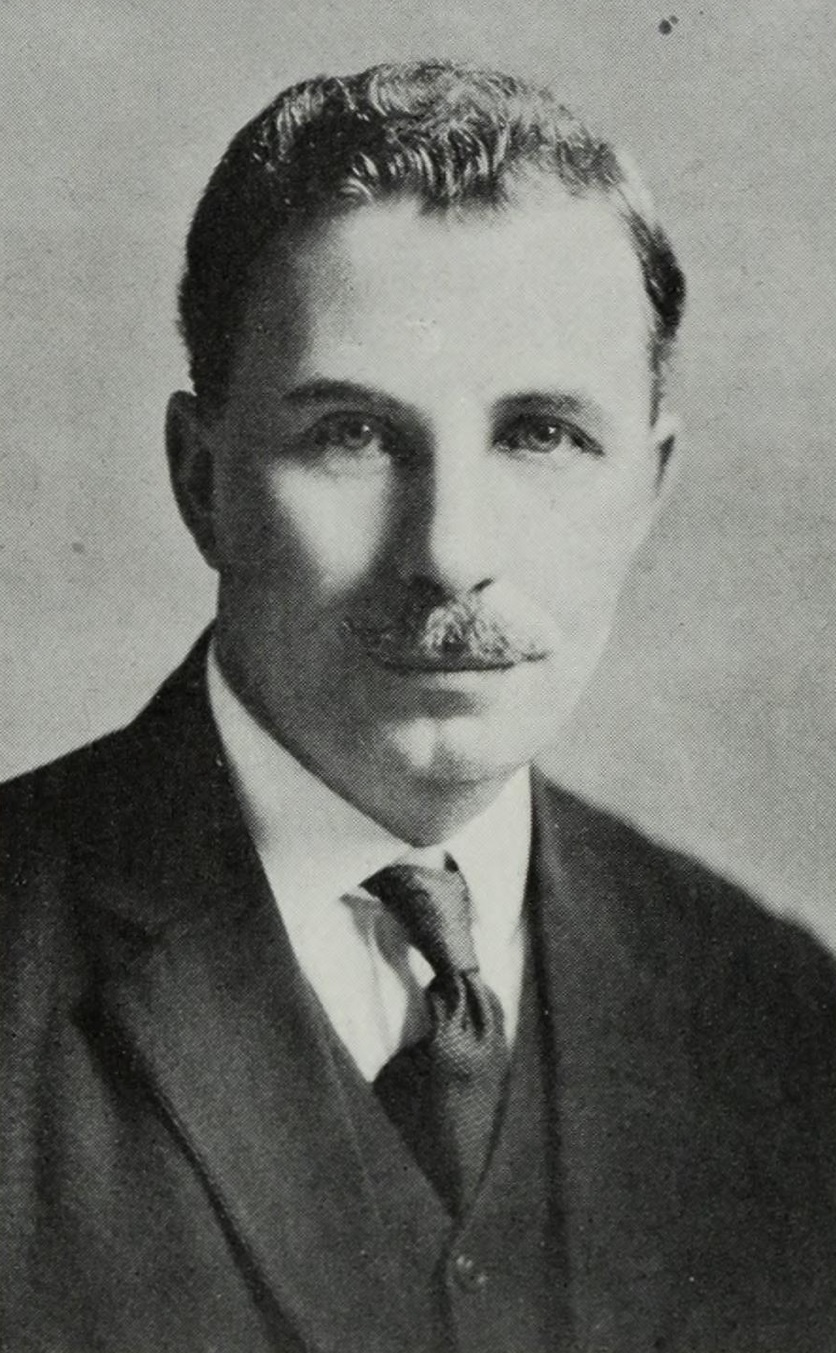

8th Territorial Governor of Hawaii
- In office March 2, 1934 – August 24, 1942
- Appointed by: Franklin D. Roosevelt
- Preceded by: Lawrence M. Judd
- Succeeded by: Ingram Stainback

6th Attorney General of Montana
- In office May 31, 1915 – January 1, 1917
- Governor: Sam V. Stewart
- Preceded by: D. M. Kelly
- Succeeded by: Sam C. Ford

Judge of the United States District Court for the Territory of Hawaii
- In office May 14, 1917 – February 16, 1924
- Appointed by: Woodrow Wilson
- Preceded by: Charles F. Clemons
- Succeeded by: William T. Rawlins

Personal details
- Born: Joseph Boyd Poindexter; April 14, 1869 Canyon City, Oregon, U.S.
- Died: December 3, 1951 (aged 82) Honolulu, Territory of Hawaii, U.S.
- Party: Democratic
- Spouse: Margaret Conger
- Children: 2
- Education: Wesleyan University; Washington University in St. Louis

Joseph Boyd Poindexter (April 14, 1869 – December 3, 1951) was the eighth Territorial Governor of Hawaii, serving from 1934 to 1942.

== Early life ==
Joseph Boyd Poindexter was born in Canyon City, Oregon to Thomas W. and Margaret (Pipkin) Poindexter. He attended Wesleyan University and earned his LL.B. degree from Washington University School of Law. He was admitted to the Montana Bar in 1892, and served as County Attorney of Beaverhead County, Montana from 1897 to 1903. He was appointed judge of the Fifth Judicial District in Beaverhead, Madison, and Jefferson counties, Montana in 1909. He later served as a district judge in Montana from 1909 to 1915, and he later served as Attorney General of Montana from 1915 to 1917.

== Career ==
In 1917, President Woodrow Wilson appointed Poindexter as Judge on the United States District Court for the District of Hawaii. Poindexter served in that capacity from May 14, 1917, to February 16, 1924. He then practiced law in Hawaii until 1934. President Franklin D. Roosevelt appointed Poindexter the eighth governor of Hawaii on January 30, 1934.

A joint Congressional Committee visited Hawaii in 1937 and submitted a report in February 1938 recommending a plebiscite for Hawaii statehood. The plebiscite, held on November 5, 1940, resulted in the voters recommending statehood for Hawaii.

Poindexter was appointed to the governorship of Hawaii by Roosevelt in 1934; he was reappointed to the governorship in 1938. Poindexter was the only second territorial governor to that point to serve more than one term of office.

In the immediate aftermath of the Japanese attack on Pearl Harbor on December 7, 1941, Poindexter placed the territory under martial law and allowed the U.S. military to form a military government. He mobilized the Hawaii Territorial Guard while the attack was still ongoing and appointed himself its captain general. The military government would continue until 1943. After his term expired, Poindexter remained in office until August 24, 1942, when his successor, Ingram Stainback, was confirmed. He remained in Hawaii and practiced law and in July 1943, the Hawaii supreme Court appointed him as one of the trustees of the Bernice Pauahi Bishop Estate.

=== Gubernatorial accomplishments ===
An editorial at his death credited Poindexter with a balanced budget, improved civil service and wage laws that regulated child labor and improved public health and welfare. During his administration the Hawaii Housing Authority was established, and projects such as the "Mayor Wright homes" (named for George F. Wright) were begun. He advocated for larger airports and other major public works projects, including roads, parks, schools and the Ala Wai Golf Course.

== Later life ==
Poindexter resumed his law practice after leaving the governorship. In July 1943, the Hawaii Supreme Court appointed him a trustee of the Bernice Pauahi Bishop Estate (now Kamehameha Schools), in which capacity he served until his death in Honolulu, Hawaii on December 3, 1951. His picture appeared on the cover of the July 23, 1934 Times Magazine. He is buried next to his wife Margaret in Mountain View cemetery in Dillon, Montana.

== Personal life ==
Poindexter married Margaret Conger in Dillon, Montana on April 22, 1897. The couple had two children.

== Fraternal memberships ==
- Benevolent and Protective Order of Elks
- Freemason
- Shriner

Legal offices
| Preceded by D. M. Kelly | Attorney General of Montana; 1915–1917 | Succeeded by Sam C. Ford |
| Preceded by Charles F. Clemons | United States District Court Judge; 1917–1924 | Succeeded by William T. Rawlins |
Political offices
| Preceded by Lawrence M. Judd | Territorial Governor of Hawaii; 1934–1942 | Succeeded by Ingram Stainback |
