= Benjamin F. White (Montana politician) =

American lawyer, banker, and politician from Montana

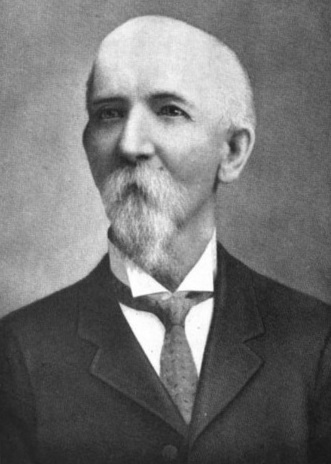

9th Governor of Montana Territory
- In office April 9, 1889 – November 8, 1889
- Appointed by: Benjamin Harrison
- Preceded by: Preston Leslie
- Succeeded by: Joseph Toole as state Governor

6th Lieutenant Governor of Montana
- In office 1908–1909
- Governor: Edwin L. Norris
- Preceded by: Edwin L. Norris
- Succeeded by: William R. Allen

Member of the Montana House of Representatives

Member of the Montana Senate
- In office 1904-1908

Personal details
- Born: December 3, 1838 New Bedford, Massachusetts, U.S.
- Died: December 4, 1920 (aged 82) Dillon, Montana, U.S.
- Party: Republican
- Spouse: Elizabeth Davis

Benjamin Franklin White (December 3, 1838 – December 4, 1920) was an American lawyer, banker, and politician. He was the final Governor of the Montana Territory.

== Biography ==
White was born to Benjamin and Caroline (Stockbridge) White in New Bedford, Massachusetts on December 3, 1838. He was educated at the Pierce Academy in Middleborough, Massachusetts until the age of 18 when he took a job as a sailor.

After two voyages he arrived in California in 1856 and gave up his life at sea. In 1857, he took a position overseeing a large fruit farm in the Napa Valley.

In 1866, White moved from California and settled in Malad City, Idaho Territory, and became involved in producing salt. He studied law, and two years after his arrival in Idaho, he was admitted to the bar. From 1868 to 1869, he was Clerk for the United States District Court. He was also Recorder of Oneida County. In addition to his government positions, White became Vice President of the First National Bank of Caldwell.

== Career ==
White left for the Montana Territory in 1876. Four years later, with the aid of a business partner, he founded the city of Dillon. He served as Mayor of Dillon for two terms. He served as founder and President of the First National Bank of Dillon. White was elected to a two-year term in the Montana Territorial legislature in 1882.

The United States Senate confirmed White as Governor of the Montana Territory on March 29, 1889. White was not affiliated with any specific segment of the territorial Republican Party, and President Benjamin Harrison had made the nomination as a compromise between competing candidates from the various factions. White took office on April 9, 1889.

The Enabling Act of 1889 had been passed by the time White took office, and his administration primarily dealt with the process of converting Montana from a territory to a state. He issued a proclamation calling for an election of delegates to a convention to create a state constitution. This was followed by a second election to ratify the proposed constitution. White's term as governor ended on November 8, 1889, when Montana was admitted to the Union.

After leaving office, White worked as President of White Investment Company. He remained active in politics, serving from 1902 till 1904 as Speaker of the Montana House of Representatives, and from 1904 till 1908 in the Montana Senate.

== Personal life ==
On February 14, 1879, White married Elizabeth Davis. They had four children: Carolyn, Emrys, Ralph, and Margaret.

=== Death ===
On December 4, 1920, White died in Dillon, Montana, one day after his 82nd birthday. He was buried at Mountain View Cemetery in Dillon.

Political offices
Preceded by Edwin L. Norris	Lieutenant Governor of Montana (acting); 1908–1909	Succeeded by William R. Allen
