= Arnold Olsen =

American politician (1916–1990)

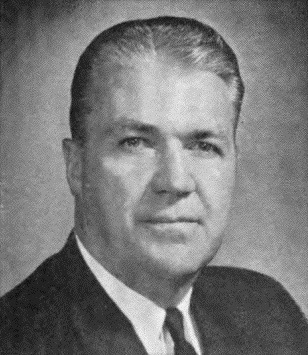

Member of the U.S. House of Representatives from Montana's 1st district
- In office January 3, 1961 – January 3, 1971
- Preceded by: Lee Metcalf
- Succeeded by: Richard G. Shoup

16th Attorney General of Montana
- In office 1949–1957
- Governor: John W. Bonner; J. Hugo Aronson
- Preceded by: R. V. Bottombly
- Succeeded by: Forrest H. Anderson

Personal details
- Born: December 17, 1916 Butte, Montana, U.S.
- Died: October 9, 1990 (aged 73) Helena, Montana, U.S.
- Party: Democratic
- Spouse: Margaret Mary Williams
- Education: Montana School of Mines; Montana State University Law School

Arnold Olsen (December 17, 1916 – October 9, 1990) was a U.S. Democratic politician who served as the attorney general of Montana from 1949 to 1957, and as a member of the United States House of Representatives from Montana's 1st congressional district from 1961 to 1971.

== Early life ==
He was born in Butte, Montana on December 17, 1916, to Anna (née Vennes) and Albert Olsen, both Norwegian immigrants. He attended Butte public schools, the Montana School of Mines, 1934–1936, and graduated from the Montana State University Law School (now the University of Montana), Missoula, Montana in 1940. He served four years of overseas duty in the Navy during World War II. In August 1942, during shore leave, Olsen married Margaret Mary Williams, of Butte. They had three children - Margaret Rae Olsen, Anna Kristine Olsen, and Karin Synneve Olsen Billings. Arnold and Margaret have 5 grandchildren; John-David Childs, Todd Arnold Graetz, Kara Ann (Graetz) Trapp; Jonathan Olsen Billings and Luke Alexander Billings. They had three great-grandchildren, Victoria Graetz and Sawyer and Ella Olsen Trapp.

== Career ==
Olsen opened a private law practice in 1940. He was elected as Attorney General of Montana in 1948, and was re-elected in 1952. Rather than seek re-election, he instead opted to run for Governor of Montana in 1956, and, after narrowly defeating former Governor John W. Bonner in the Democratic primary, advanced to the general election, where he faced incumbent Governor J. Hugo Aronson. Following a close campaign, Olsen narrowly lost to Aronson. Following his defeat, he ran for the position of Chief Justice of the Montana Supreme Court, but lost to incumbent Chief Justice James T. Harrison by a slim margin.

In 1960, when Congressman Lee Metcalf opted to run for the Senate rather than seek re-election, Olsen ran to succeed him in the 1st congressional district. He defeated George P. Sarsfield, the Republican nominee, winning his first of five terms. Olsen was narrowly re-elected over Republican Wayne Montgomery in 1962, and by a wider margin against Montgomery in 1964. In 1966, he defeated Republican nominee Dick Smiley by about two thousand votes, and, in a rematch against Smiley in 1968, by a wider margin. When Olsen ran for a sixth term in 1970, he was narrowly defeated for re-election by Richard G. Shoup, the Mayor of Missoula. He ran against Shoup again in 1972, but ultimately lost to him. In 1974, he ran for Congress one final time, but lost in the Democratic primary to Max Baucus, who ended up defeating Shoup in the general election.

Olsen was appointed by Governor Thomas Lee Judge to the Second Judicial District of Montana, in 1977, and elected to that post in 1979 and two additional times, serving until his death in 1990.

Party political offices
Preceded by John W. Bonner	Democratic nominee for Governor of Montana; 1956	Succeeded by Paul Cannon
Legal offices
Preceded by R. V. Bottombly	Attorney General of Montana; 1949–1957	Succeeded by Forrest H. Anderson
U.S. House of Representatives
Preceded by Lee Metcalf	Member of the U.S. House of Representatives from Montana's 1st congressional district 1961–1971	Succeeded by Richard G. Shoup
