= Nancy Jackson (climber) =

American climber

Personal information
- Born: c.1956 Moscow, Idaho, U.S.
- Died: March 27, 1990, age 34 Manaslu; Nepal - Tibet border
- Parents: Melbourne L. Jackson and Elizabeth Ford Jackson
- Relatives: Sam C. Ford, grandfather

Climbing career
- Major ascents: Mount Rainier, 50+ ascents

Nancy Jackson (c. 1956 – March 27, 1990) was an American mountain climber, known for her expertise on Mount Rainier and as a climbing guide. She died while taking part in the 1990 American Manaslu Expedition when she was caught in an avalanche.

== Background ==
Jackson grew up in Moscow, Idaho; her father Melbourne L. Jackson (1915–2004) was a professor of chemical engineering at the University of Idaho, and her mother Elizabeth Ford was a daughter of Montana governor Sam C. Ford. Nancy Jackson graduated from Moscow High School in 1972 and followed in her father's footsteps, becoming an engineer.

In 1977, she earned a degree in chemical engineering from Oregon State University in Corvallis and in 1980 a master's degree from the University of Washington in Seattle. After working as an environmental engineer, Jackson later gave up her job at Weyerhaeuser to devote herself full time to climbing.

=== Mountain guide ===
Jackson moved to Federal Way, Washington where she became a mountain guide for Rainier Mountaineering Inc. She climbed Rainier more than 50 times during the 1980s and reached the summits of Denali in Alaska, and Aconcagua in Argentina, the highest peak in South America.

While working as a mountain guide, she collaborated with author Kurt Hanson on the 5th edition of Mountaineering: The Freedom of the Hills, one of the most significant guidebooks for mountaineers. Jackson contributed a new chapter on winter and expedition climbing which she completed before undertaking her final expedition to the Himalayas.

=== Final climb and legacy ===
In 1990, Jackson joined the American Manaslu Expedition, which aimed to make the first American summit of the eight-thousander. On March 27, Jackson was killed in an avalanche with expedition doctor Charles Schertz and sherpa guide, Nima Wangchuk. The accident occurred when the climbers had reached a level of 15,510 feet (4,730 m) when a 400-foot (120 m) slab avalanche gave way, entirely covering the climbers. They were found buried in the snow later that day by other team members.

After her death, her hometown congregation at the First Methodist Church in Moscow founded a hand bell choir in her memory. The Nancy Jackson Bell Choir now includes 5 complete octaves of both bells and chimes and two adult, one youth, and one children's bell choir.

== See also ==
- Deaths on Manaslu
- Mazamas, the Portland mountaineering club that sponsored the 1990 American Manaslu Expedition
- Mountaineering: The Freedom of the Hills, 5th Edition (1992) ISBN 0-89886-309-0, 0-89886-201-9 includes chapters written by Nancy on winter and expedition climbing with Kurt Hanson
