= 1908 Montana gubernatorial election =

- November 3, 1908
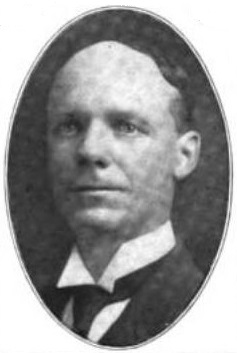

Nominee	Edwin L. Norris	Edward Donlan	Harry Hazelton
Party	Democratic	Republican	Socialist
Popular vote	32,282	30,792	5,112
Percentage	47.34%	45.16%	7.50%
- County results Norris: 40–50% 50–60% Donlan: 40–50% 50–60% 60–70%
Governor before election
Edwin L. Norris (acting)
Democratic
Elected Governor
Edwin L. Norris
Democratic

The 1908 Montana gubernatorial election was held on November 3, 1908.

Incumbent Democratic Governor Edwin L. Norris was re-elected, defeating Republican nominee Edward Donlan and Socialist nominee Harry Hazelton with 47.34% of the vote.

== General election ==
=== Candidates ===
- Edwin L. Norris, Democratic, incumbent Governor
- Edward Donlan, Republican, lumber merchant
- Harry Hazelton, Socialist

=== Results ===
1908 Montana gubernatorial election
Party	Candidate	Votes	%	±%
Democratic	Edwin L. Norris (incumbent)	32,282	47.34%	
Republican	Edward Donlan	30,792	45.16%	
Socialist	Harry Hazelton	5,112	7.50%	
Majority		1,490	2.18%	
Turnout		68,186		
Democratic hold		Swing		

== Bibliography ==
- Glashan, Roy R. (1979). American Governors and Gubernatorial Elections, 1775-1978. Meckler Books. ISBN 0-930466-17-9.
- Gubernatorial Elections, 1787-1997. Washington, D.C.: Congressional Quarterly Inc. 1998. ISBN 1-56802-396-0.
- Dubin, Michael J. (2010). United States Gubernatorial Elections, 1861-1911. Jefferson, NC: McFarland & Co. ISBN 978-0-7864-4722-0.
