= Gällstads FK =

Swedish football club

- Full name: Gällstads Fotbollklubb
- Nickname: GFK
- Founded: 2001
- Ground: Åvalla; Gällstad; Sweden
- League: Division 4 Västergötland Södra
Home colours	Away colours

Gällstads FK is a Swedish football club located in Gällstad.

== Background ==
Gällstads FK was formed on October 1, 2001, following the merger of Gällstads AIS & Gällstads IF.

Gällstads FK currently plays in Division 4 Västergötland Södra, which is the sixth tier of Swedish football. They play their home matches at the Åvalla in Gällstad.

The club is affiliated with Västergötlands Fotbollförbund. GFK has played friendly matches against Aston Villa FC in 2005 and Reading FC in 2006.

== Season to season ==
Gällstads AIS played in Västergötland Södra until the end of the 2001 season.

Season	Level	Division	Section	Position	Movements
1999	Tier 5	Division 4	Västergötland Södra	4th	
2000	Tier 5	Division 4	Västergötland Södra	5th	
2001	Tier 5	Division 4	Västergötland Södra	5th	

Gällstads FK took the place of Gällstads AIS for the 2002 season.

Season	Level	Division	Section	Position	Movements
2002	Tier 5	Division 4	Västergötland Södra	9th	
2003	Tier 5	Division 4	Västergötland Södra	12th	Relegated
2004	Tier 6	Division 5	Västergötland Södra	2nd	Promotion Playoffs – Promoted
2005	Tier 5	Division 4	Västergötland Södra	9th	
2006*	Tier 6	Division 4	Västergötland Södra	5th	
2007	Tier 6	Division 4	Västergötland Södra	6th	
2008	Tier 6	Division 4	Västergötland Södra	2nd	
2009	Tier 6	Division 4	Västergötland Södra	2nd	
2010	Tier 6	Division 4	Västergötland Södra	5th	
2011	Tier 6	Division 4	Västergötland Södra		

* League restructuring in 2006 resulted in a new division being created at Tier 3 and subsequent divisions dropping a level.
