= Ernest T. Eaton =

American politician

Lieutenant Governor of Montana
- In office January 6, 1941 – January 3, 1949
- Governor: Sam C. Ford
- Preceded by: Hugh R. Adair
- Succeeded by: Paul Cannon
- In office 1934–1935
- Governor: Frank Henry Cooney
- Preceded by: Tom Kane
- Succeeded by: Elmer Holt

Member of the Montana Senate
- In office 1925–1933

Member of the Montana House of Representatives
- In office 1923–1925
- In office 1915–1919

Personal details
- Born: September 11, 1877 Atkinson, Maine
- Died: August 23, 1957 (aged 79)
- Party: Republican
- Spouse: Augusta Valiton (m. 1911–1957)

Ernest T. Eaton (September 11, 1877 – August 23, 1957) was an American educator and politician.

== Early life and academic career ==
Ernest T. Eaton was born in Atkinson, Maine into a family of English descent, as one of four children to Thomas O. Eaton and Delia Bolster. In 1886, the family moved to Iowa, where Ernest attended Lenox College and the University of Iowa. He began teaching at Oak Park High School in Des Moines, later serving the school system as high school principal and superintendent. Eaton left for Montana in 1902 to become superintendent of Deer Lodge, Montana schools and founding principal of Powell County High School.

In 1904, Eaton, his brother Lewis, and two merchants, John Losekamp and Christian Yegen founded a private high school. Eaton left Powell County on January 1, 1906 and was named financial director of the College of Montana. There, he worked alongside Lewis, the institution's president. The Eaton brothers left the College of Montana in 1908, devoting more funding to the reorganization of the high school they had established with the help of Losekamp and Yegen. The school was reopened as Billings Polytechnic Institute in July 1908.

== Political career and death ==
Ernest Eaton first served in the Montana House of Representatives between 1915 and 1919. He won a third term in 1923, and was elected to the Montana Senate in 1925. He stepped down from the state senate in 1933. The next year, Eaton became lieutenant governor of Montana under Frank Henry Cooney. He was succeeded by Elmer Holt, and later served in the same position between 1941 and 1949, alongside governor Sam C. Ford. Eaton died at the age of 79, on August 23, 1957.

He was survived by his wife, Augusta Valiton, whom he had married in 1911, and two children.
