= 1944 Montana gubernatorial election =

- November 7, 1944
- Turnout: 79.40%▼2.10
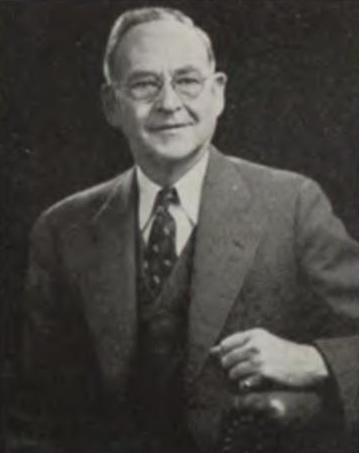

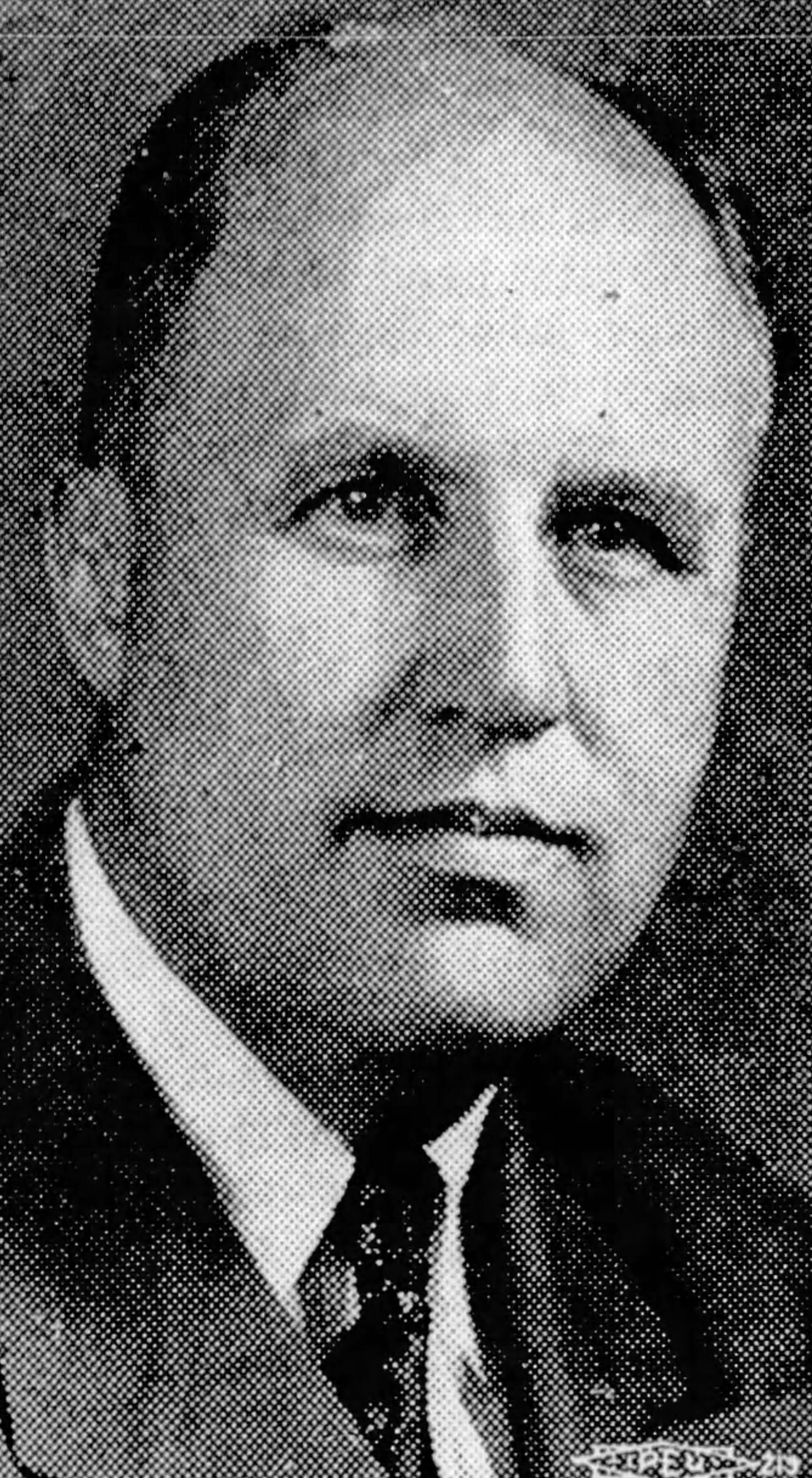
Nominee	Sam C. Ford	Leif Erickson
Party	Republican	Democratic
Popular vote	116,461	89,224
Percentage	56.36%	43.18%
- County results Ford: 50–60% 60–70% 70–80% Erickson: 50–60% 60–70%
Governor before election
Sam C. Ford
Republican
Elected Governor
Sam C. Ford
Republican

The 1944 Montana gubernatorial election took place on November 7, 1944. Incumbent Governor of Montana Sam C. Ford, who was first elected Governor in 1940, ran for re-election. He won the Republican primary and moved on to the general election, where he was opposed by Leif Erickson, a former Chief Justice of the Montana Supreme Court and the Democratic nominee. Although then-President Franklin D. Roosevelt comfortably won the state in that year's presidential election, Ford defeated Erickson by a wide margin to win his second and final term as governor. This election is the first time that an incumbent Republican Governor of Montana was re-elected or won re-election.

== Democratic primary ==
=== Candidates ===
- Leif Erickson, former Chief Justice of the Montana Supreme Court
- Austin B. Middleton, chairman of the Montana Railroad and Public Service Commission
- Roy E. Ayers, former Governor of Montana

=== Results ===
Democratic Party primary results
Party	Candidate	Votes	%
Democratic	Leif Erickson	28,292	47.05
Democratic	Austin B. Middleton	17,756	29.53
Democratic	Roy E. Ayers	14,082	23.42
Total votes		60,130	100.00

== Republican primary ==
=== Candidates ===
- Sam C. Ford, incumbent Governor of Montana
- Jacob Thorkelson, former United States Congressman from Montana's 1st congressional district

=== Results ===
Republican Primary results
Party	Candidate	Votes	%
Republican	Sam C. Ford (incumbent)	39,826	88.24
Republican	Jacob Thorkelson	5,306	11.76
Total votes		45,132	100.00

== General election ==
=== Results ===
Montana gubernatorial election, 1944
Party	Candidate	Votes	%	±%
Republican	Sam C. Ford (incumbent)	116,461	56.36%	+5.69%
Democratic	Leif Erickson	89,224	43.18%	−5.46%
Prohibition	Charles R. Miller	960	0.46%	
Majority		27,237	13.18%	+11.15%
Turnout		222,964		
Republican hold		Swing		
