= Richard G. Shoup =

American politician

Dick Shoup
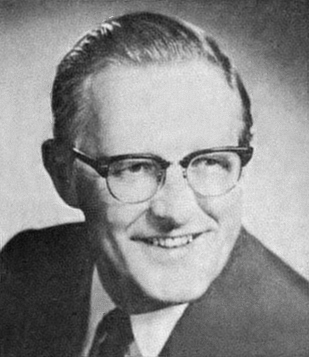

Member of the U.S. House of Representatives from Montana's 1st district
- In office January 3, 1971 – January 3, 1975
- Preceded by: Arnold Olsen
- Succeeded by: Max Baucus

Personal details
- Born: November 29, 1923 Salmon, Idaho, U.S.
- Died: November 25, 1995 (aged 71) Missoula, Montana, U.S.
- Party: Republican
- Education: University of Montana

Richard Gardner "Dick" Shoup (November 29, 1923 – November 25, 1995) was a U.S. representative from Montana, great-grandson of George Laird Shoup.

== Education ==
Born in Salmon, Idaho, Shoup attended the Salmon public schools. He received his B.S. from the University of Montana in Missoula, Montana in 1950.

== Military ==
He served in the United States Army, European Theater, Field Artillery from 1943 to 1946. He served in the Korean War from 1951 to 1952.

== Early career ==
He was owner-operator of a laundry and dry cleaning business from 1954 to 1967. He was employed in the agriculture service department of Montana Flour Mills from 1953 to 1954.

== Political career ==
Shoup was elected alderman on the Missoula City Council from 1963 to 1967, serving as president from 1965 to 1967. He served as mayor of Missoula, Montana from 1967 to 1970. He served as member of the Governor's (Montana) Crime Commission from 1969 to 1970, and on the Montana League of Cities and Towns from 1967 to 1970.

Shoup was elected as a Republican to the Ninety-second and Ninety-third Congresses (January 3, 1971 – January 3, 1975).

He was an unsuccessful candidate for reelection in 1974 to the Ninety-fourth Congress.

His chief concerns as a U.S. Representative were the Conquest of Cancer Act, soldiers missing in action from the Vietnam War, energy development, and proper labeling of beef products.

== Other activities ==
He served as director of the Union Pacific Railroad from 1975 to 1984.

He died November 25, 1995.

U.S. House of Representatives
Preceded by Arnold Olsen	Member of the U.S. House of Representatives from Montana's 1st congressional district 1971–1975	Succeeded by Max Baucus
