= RMI Expeditions =

Mountain guide company

RMI Expeditions, Rainier Mountaineering Inc.
- Abbreviation: RMI
- Founded: 1969
- Founders: Jerry Lynch, Lou Whittaker
- Type: Mountain guide
- Headquarters: 30027 SR 706 East; Ashford, Washington, U.S.
- Region served: Worldwide
- Services: Guided mountain climbing
- Members: American Mountain Guides Association
- Owner: Peter Whittaker
- Subsidiaries: Whittaker Mountaineering
- Website: www.rmiguides.com

RMI Expeditions, also known as Rainier Mountaineering Inc. (RMI), is a mountain guide company based in Ashford, Washington founded in 1969 by Jerry Lynch and Lou Whittaker. It leads mountaineering, ski mountaineering, and ice climbing trips on Mount Rainier and the Seven Summits.

== Background ==
RMI Expeditions leads mountaineering trips on Mount Rainier, the Seven Summits – Mount Everest, Aconcagua, Mount McKinley, Mount Kilimanjaro, Mount Elbrus, Vinson Massif, and Carstensz Pyramid. The company also guides in the North Cascades, Chile, Ecuador, Mexico, and Peru.

RMI is owned and operated by Peter Whittaker, the son of Lou Whittaker and the nephew of Jim Whittaker, who was the first American mountaineer to successfully reach the summit of Mount Everest. Peter Whittaker has been at the head of RMI since the late 1990s.

=== Accreditation ===
RMI is accredited by the American Mountain Guides Association (AMGA). AMGA accreditation certifies that client education in essential mountaineering skills is a primary focus of the mountain guide company.

=== Expedition guides ===
RMI guides include Peter Whittaker, Dave Hahn, Melissa Arnot, and Ed Viesturs.

=== Awards ===
In 2014, RMI was named “Best Outfitter” by Outside Magazine in their 2014 Travel Awards.

=== Charity work ===
Since 1988, RMI has supported the American Lung Association of the Mountain Pacific through the Climb for Clean Air fundraiser. During the annual charity climb, RMI guides lead fundraiser participants on a guided trip to the summit of Mount Rainier. Between 1988 and 2014, RMI has raised $4.4 million for the ALA. In 2009, RMI guides Ed Viesturs and Peter Whittaker led a charity climb on Mt. Rainier with NFL Commissioner Roger Goodell, former Seattle Seahawks Coach Jim Mora, and former Seattle Seahawks CEO Tod Leiweke. The mountaineering trip raised $400,000 for United Way of King County in Washington State.

Also in 2009, RMI founded the Responsible Climbing Initiative. This arm of the company supports environmental organizations through monetary donations.

RMI is a partner of the Leave No Trace program of the Center for Outdoor Ethics. Leave No Trace partners raise awareness of outdoor ethics.

== First Ascent ==
In 2009, Eddie Bauer and a group of RMI guides worked together to design a line of technical outdoor clothing called "First Ascent".

== See also ==
- Nancy Jackson, former RMI guide and mountaineer
