= Gällstad =

- Location within Västra Götaland Location within Sweden
- Coordinates: 57°40′N 13°26′E
- Country: Sweden
- Province: Västergötland
- County: Västra Götaland County
- Municipality: Ulricehamn Municipality

Area
  - Total: 0.61 km^{2} (0.24 sq mi)

Population (31 December 2010)
  - Total: 471
  - Density: 773/km^{2} (2,000/sq mi)
- Time zone: UTC+1 (CET)
  - Summer (DST): UTC+2 (CEST)
- Climate: Dfb

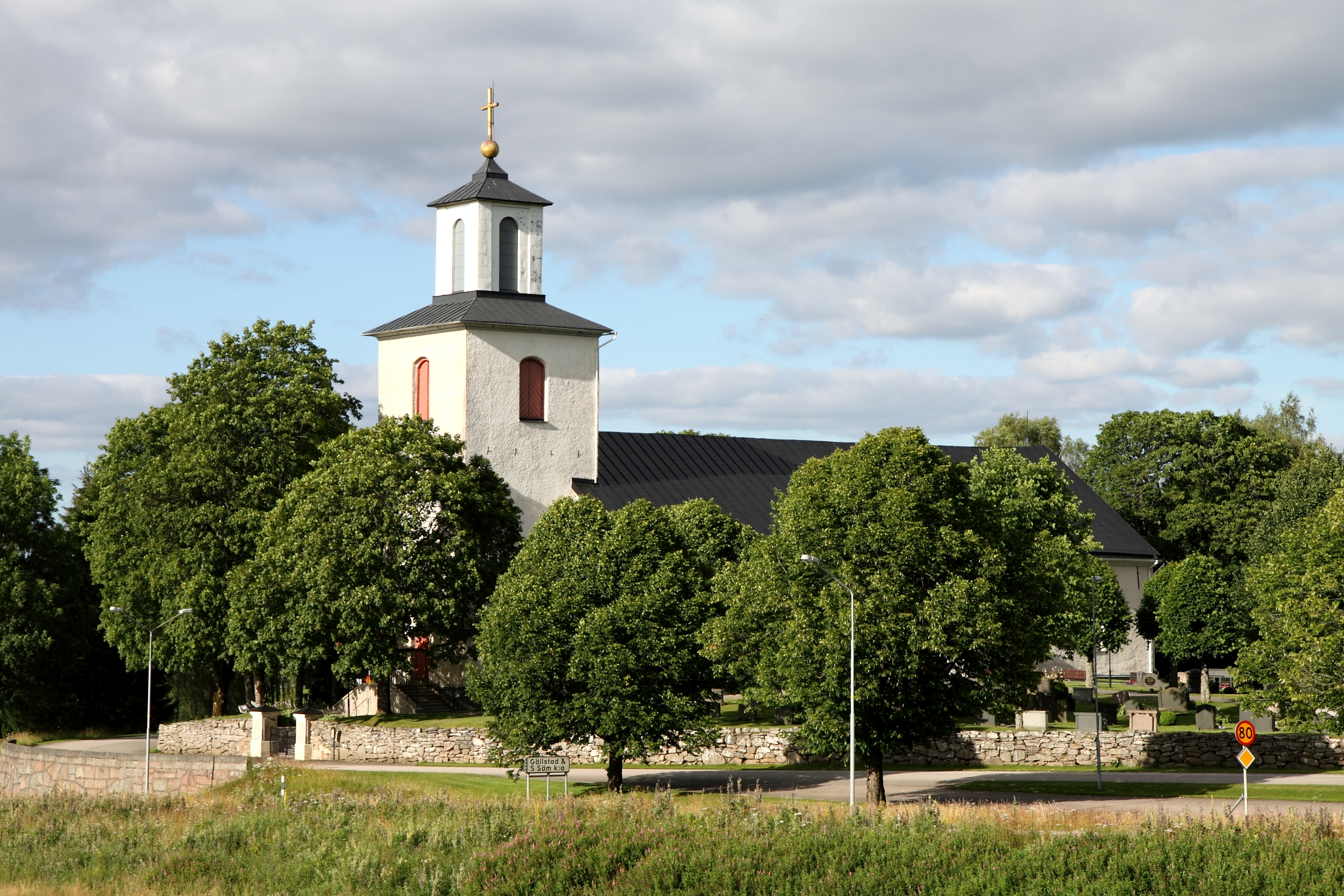

Gällstad is a locality situated in Ulricehamn Municipality, Västra Götaland County, Sweden with 597 inhabitants in 2020.

== Sports ==
The following sports clubs are located in Gällstad:

- Gällstads FK

== Notable people ==
- J. Hugo Aronson, American politician, born there in 1891
