= William P. Pilgeram =

American politician

William Peter Pilgeram

Member of the Montana House of Representatives
- In office ???–???

Speaker of the Montana House of Representatives
- In office 1935

15th Lieutenant Governor of Montana
- In office December 16, 1935 – January 4, 1937
- Governor: Elmer Holt
- Preceded by: Elmer Holt
- Succeeded by: Hugh R. Adair

Personal details
- Born: March 11, 1890 Great Falls, Montana, U.S.
- Died: April 7, 1972 (aged 82)
- Party: Democratic

William Peter Pilgeram (March 11, 1890 – April 7, 1972), also known as W. P. Pilgeram and Bill Pilgeram, was an American politician. He served as lieutenant governor of Montana from 1935 to 1937.

== Life and career ==
Pilgeram was born in Great Falls, Montana. He was a sergeant in the United States Marine Corps during World War I.

In 1935, Pilgeram was elected to the Montana lieutenant governorship, succeeding Elmer Holt. He served until 1937, when he was succeeded by Hugh R. Adair.

Pilgeram died in April 1972, at the age of 82.
