= 1940 Montana gubernatorial election =

- November 5, 1940
- Turnout: 81.50%▲1.70
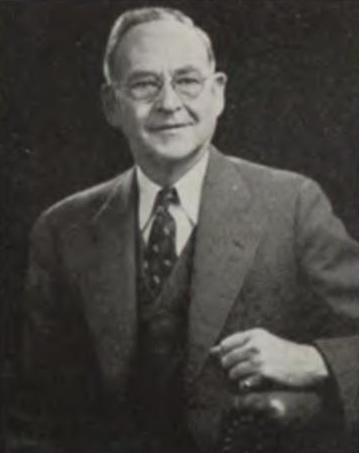

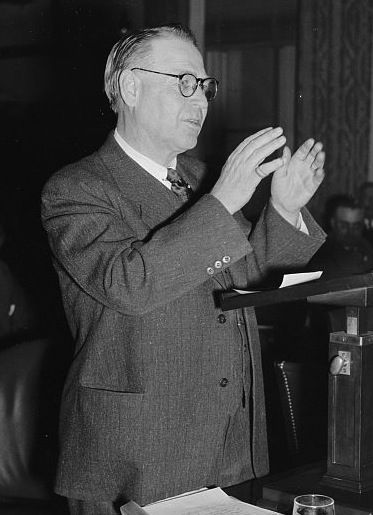
Nominee	Sam C. Ford	Roy E. Ayers
Party	Republican	Democratic
Popular vote	124,435	119,453
Percentage	50.67%	48.64%
- County results Ford: 40–50% 50–60% 60–70% Ayers: 40–50% 50–60%
Governor before election
Roy E. Ayers
Democratic
Elected Governor
Sam C. Ford
Republican

The 1940 Montana gubernatorial election took place on November 5, 1940. Incumbent governor of Montana Roy E. Ayers, who was first elected governor in 1936, ran for re-election. He narrowly won the Democratic primary by just over a thousand votes to win renomination, and advanced to the general election, where he was opposed by Sam C. Ford, a former Associate Justice of the Montana Supreme Court and the Republican nominee. Ultimately, in spite of the fact that then-President Franklin D. Roosevelt comfortably won the state in that year's presidential election, Ford narrowly defeated Ayers to win his first of two terms as governor.

== Democratic primary ==
=== Candidates ===
- Roy E. Ayers, incumbent governor of Montana
- Arthur F. Lamey, former chairman of the Montana Democratic Party, former Hill County Attorney
- A. E. Kathan

=== Results ===
Democratic Party primary results
Party	Candidate	Votes	%
Democratic	Roy E. Ayers (incumbent)	40,268	38.23
Democratic	Arthur F. Lamey	39,010	37.04
Democratic	A. E. Kathan	26,041	24.73
Total votes		105,319	100.00

== Republican primary ==
=== Candidates ===
- Sam C. Ford, former Associate Justice of the Montana Supreme Court
- Charles A. Hauswirth, Mayor of Butte
- Julius J. Wuerthner, former Mayor of Great Falls
- T. S. Stockdahl
- Martin P. Moe, former Secretary of the Montana Education Association
- John H. Leuthold

=== Results ===
Republican Primary results
Party	Candidate	Votes	%
Republican	Sam C. Ford	16,335	32.90
Republican	Charles A. Hauswirth	14,397	29.00
Republican	Julius J. Wuerthner	8,685	17.49
Republican	T. S. Stockdahl	5,439	10.95
Republican	Martin P. Moe	3,994	8.04
Republican	John H. Leuthold	802	1.62
Total votes		49,652	100.00

== General election ==
=== Results ===
Montana gubernatorial election, 1940
Party	Candidate	Votes	%	±%
Republican	Sam C. Ford	124,435	50.67%	+2.55%
Democratic	Roy E. Ayers (incumbent)	119,453	48.64%	−2.31%
Communist	Arvo Fredrickson	1,713	0.70%	+0.53%
Majority		4,982	2.03%	−0.80%
Turnout		245,601		
Republican gain from Democratic		Swing		
