= J. Hugo Aronson =

American politician (1891–1978)

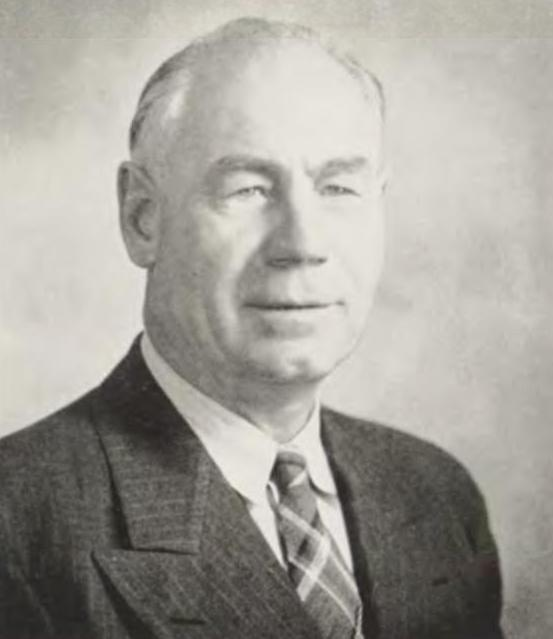

14th Governor of Montana
- In office January 4, 1953 – January 4, 1961
- Lieutenant: George M. Gosman; Paul C. Cannon
- Preceded by: John W. Bonner
- Succeeded by: Donald G. Nutter

Member of the Montana Senate
- In office 1944

Member of the Montana House of Representatives
- In office 1938

Personal details
- Born: Johan Hugo Aronsson; September 1, 1891 Gällstad, Västergötland, Sweden
- Died: February 25, 1978 (aged 86) Columbia Falls, Montana, United States
- Party: Republican
- Spouse(s): Matilda Langane (1919–1936); Rose McClure (1944–1968)
- Occupation: Oil-field worker, businessman

John Hugo Aronson (September 1, 1891 – February 25, 1978) was an American businessman and politician from the Republican Party and the 14th Governor of the State of Montana.

== Biography ==
John Hugo Aronson was born in Gällstad, Älvsborg County, Sweden. He was one of five children born to Johan Aron Johansson (1856–1927) and Juliana Fredrika Johansdotter (1857–1940). Aronson was married twice, to Matilda Langane and then to Rose McClure.

== Career ==
In 1915, Aronson filed for a 320-acre (1.3 km^{2}) homestead in Elk Basin, Montana. In 1922 oil was discovered in the Kevin Sunburst Oil Field in Toole County, among the richest Montana's natural gas and oil fields. Aronson operated his own rig-building outfit. He soon added a trucking business to the rig-building company and started advertising as "The Galloping Swede". He served as a member of Montana House of Representatives in 1938 and the Montana Senate in 1944.

Aronson ran for Governor of Montana in 1952, challenging incumbent Democratic governor John W. Bonner, whom he ended up narrowly defeating. When he ran for re-election in 1956, he was opposed by State Attorney General Arnold Olsen, whom he defeated by a slim margin to win his second and final term as governor. Aronson authorized the exclusive revenue for the state Highway Department with the creation of state gasoline user taxes. Governor Aronson also authorized the creation of the Legislative Council to assist the legislative branch in the creation of necessary law.

Aronson died in the Veterans Hospital at Columbia Falls, Montana, exactly ten years after his wife's death. He was buried in Pleasant View Cemetery, Mondovi, Lincoln County, Washington.

Party political offices
Preceded by Sam C. Ford	Republican nominee for Governor of Montana; 1952, 1956	Succeeded by Donald Grant Nutter
Political offices
Preceded by John W. Bonner	Governor of Montana; 1953–1961	Succeeded by Donald Grant Nutter
