= Edwin L. Norris =

American politician

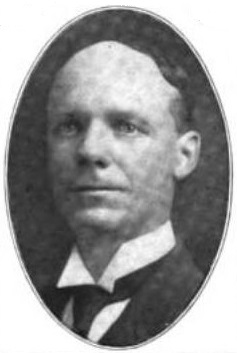

5th Governor of Montana
- In office April 1, 1908 – January 5, 1913
- Lieutenant: Benjamin F. White; William R. Allen
- Preceded by: Joseph Toole
- Succeeded by: Sam V. Stewart

5th Lieutenant Governor of Montana
- In office 1905–1908
- Governor: Joseph Toole
- Preceded by: Frank G. Higgins
- Succeeded by: Benjamin F. White

Member of the Montana Senate
- In office 1896-1900

Personal details
- Born: August 15, 1865 Cumberland County, Kentucky, U.S.
- Died: April 25, 1924 (aged 58) Great Falls, Montana, U.S.
- Party: Democratic
- Education: Southern Normal School
- Occupation: Lawyer

Edwin Lee Norris (August 15, 1865 – April 25, 1924) was a Democratic politician from Montana. He served as the fifth Governor of Montana.

== Biography ==
Norris was born in Cumberland County, Kentucky, in 1865, and graduated from the Southern Normal School, now Western Kentucky University in Bowling Green, Kentucky. He moved from Kentucky to Montana in 1888, studied law and was admitted to the Montana bar on October 8, 1889. He married Elizabeth June Wilkins. He practiced law in Dillon, Montana, and was city attorney there for five years.

== Career ==
Norris was elected to the Montana State Senate in 1896 and served until 1900, serving as the Senate President in 1899. He served as the state's fifth Lieutenant Governor from 1905 to 1908.

He became Governor on April 1, 1908, upon the resignation of Joseph K. Toole, and was elected in his own right in the November 1908 election, serving until 1913. Norris is credited with signing state laws prohibiting discrimination by life insurance companies and making mine operators liable when employees became disabled.

Norris championed the use of prison labor to build roads in Montana. As governor, he sat on the State Board of Prison Commissioners. Thanks to his influence, prison labor built more than 230 miles of roads in Montana between 1913 and 1921.

== Death ==
Norris died in Great Falls, Montana in 1924, where he had lived since leaving the Governor's office. He was first buried in Fairview Cemetery and later moved to New Highland Cemetery where he is still interred.

Party political offices
Preceded by Joseph Toole	Democratic nominee for Governor of Montana; 1908	Succeeded by Sam V. Stewart
Political offices
Preceded by Frank G. Higgins	Lieutenant Governor of Montana; 1905–1908	Succeeded by Benjamin F. White
Preceded by Joseph Toole	Governor of Montana; 1908-1913	Succeeded by Sam V. Stewart
