= Roy E. Ayers =

American judge

Roy Elmer Ayers
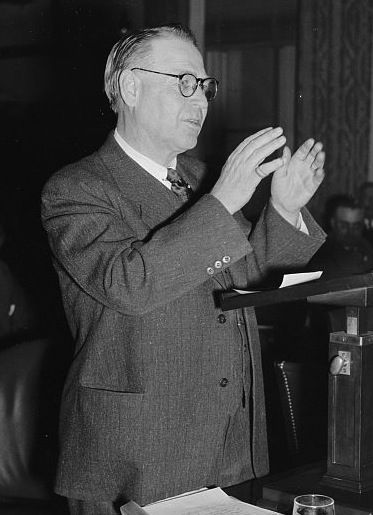

11th Governor of Montana
- In office January 4, 1937 – January 6, 1941
- Lieutenant: Hugh R. Adair
- Preceded by: Elmer Holt
- Succeeded by: Sam C. Ford

Member of the U.S. House of Representatives from Montana's 2nd district
- In office March 4, 1933 – January 3, 1937
- Preceded by: Scott Leavitt
- Succeeded by: James F. O'Connor

Personal details
- Born: November 9, 1882 Lewistown, Montana Territory
- Died: May 23, 1955 (aged 72) Lewistown, Montana, U.S.
- Party: Democratic
- Profession: Lawyer, rancher

Roy Elmer Ayers (November 9, 1882 – May 23, 1955) was a U.S. Democratic politician. He served as a member of the United States House of Representatives and as the 11th governor of Montana. He was the first governor of Montana to be born in what would become the state of Montana.

== Biography ==
Ayers was born on a ranch near Lewistown in the Territory of Montana, and attended the rural schools in the area. He attended Lewistown High School and graduated from the law department of Valparaiso University in 1903. He was admitted to the bar the same year and commenced practice in Lewistown, He also became engaged in ranching and the raising of livestock. On June 7, 1905, he married Ellen Simpson and the couple had three children.

== Career ==
Ayers served as attorney of Fergus County, Montana from 1905 to 1909, and Judge of the Tenth Judicial District of Montana from 1913 to 1921. During the First World War, Ayers served as chairman of the Fergus County Exemption Board. He was the Justice of the State supreme court from January 1922 until his resignation on November 22, 1922, when he resumed ranching and the private practice of law in Lewistown. In 1924, he ran for Governor of Montana, but lost in the Democratic primary to John E. Erickson, who would later go on to win the general election. Ayers challenged him in the primary again in 1928, and was defeated by less than a thousand votes by Erickson, who again won the general election.

In 1932, Ayers was elected to the United States House of Representatives from Montana's 2nd congressional district, defeating Republican Congressman Scott Leavitt. He was re-elected over Republican nominee Stanley Felt in 1934 in a landslide.

Rather than seek re-election to a third term, Ayers opted to run for governor in 1936, and narrowly defeated incumbent governor Elmer Holt in the Democratic primary. In the general election, he barely defeated former Lieutenant Governor of Montana Frank Hazelbaker, the Republican nominee. During his administration, he oversaw the expansion of the state bureaucracy, signed a bill to give the governor new powers in directing state government, the state deficit was eliminated, and state bond interests were lowered. In 1940, Dr. J.C. Dunn, superintendent of Warm Springs State Hospital (now Montana State Hospital) and longtime campaign supporter of Ayers' testified before a select committee hearing by the Montana Senate about the misappropriation of foodstuffs from both the hospital and state liquor warehouse by Governor Ayers. Dunn testified that he was told to supply the governor's mansion with food from Warm Springs, bringing produce meant for the hospital to Ayers' home on several occasions. On one occasion, Dunn noted, supplies brought to the Ayers' home were estimated to be "...a hundred pounds of sugar, about two cases of canned goods, fifteen pounds of butter, fifty to seventy-five pounds of meat..." Dunn additionally noted that both Ayers and himself took liquor from the state liquor warehouse without paying on several occasions. When he ran for re-election in 1940, he only won the Democratic primary with a thin plurality, and was defeated in the general election by Sam C. Ford, a former Montana Supreme Court Associate Justice. He ran in the Democratic primary to challenge Ford in 1944, but came in third behind Leif Erickson and Austin B. Middleton.

He was a delegate to the Democratic National Conventions in 1920 and 1940, and to every State Democratic Convention from 1906 to 1940.

== Death ==
After ending his political career, Ayers returned to ranching. He died in Lewistown, Montana, and was interred at the Lewistown City Cemetery in 1955.

Party political offices
Preceded by John E. Erickson	Democratic nominee for Governor of Montana; 1936, 1940	Succeeded by Leif Erickson
U.S. House of Representatives
Preceded by Scott Leavitt	United States Representative for the 2nd congressional district of Montana; 1933–1937	Succeeded by James F. O'Connor
Political offices
Preceded by Elmer Holt	Governor of Montana; 1937 – 1941	Succeeded by Sam C. Ford
