= 1952 Montana gubernatorial election =

- November 4, 1952
- Turnout: 85.70%▲3.80
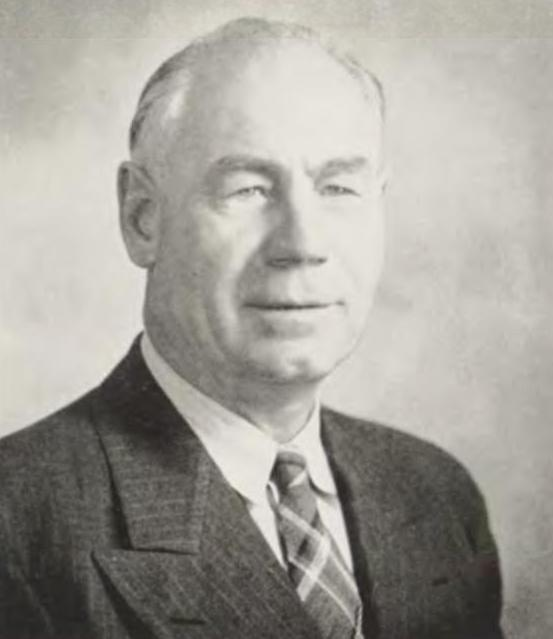

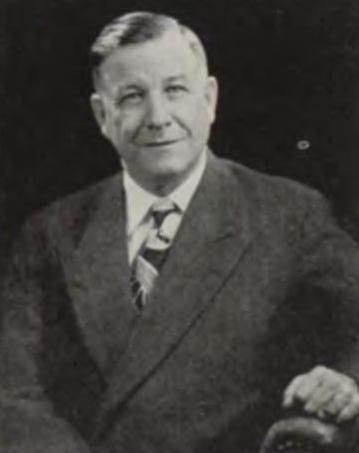
Nominee	J. Hugo Aronson	John W. Bonner
Party	Republican	Democratic
Popular vote	134,423	129,369
Percentage	50.96%	49.04%
- County results Aronson: 50–60% 60–70% 70–80% Bonner: 50–60% 60–70%
Governor before election
John W. Bonner
Democratic
Elected Governor
J. Hugo Aronson
Republican

The 1952 Montana gubernatorial election took place on November 4, 1952. Incumbent Governor of Montana John W. Bonner, who was first elected governor in 1948, ran for re-election. He was unopposed in the Democratic primary and moved on to the general election, where he was opposed by J. Hugo Aronson, a State Senator and the Republican nominee. A close election ensued, with Aronson narrowly defeating Bonner to win the first of his two terms as governor.

== Democratic primary ==
=== Candidates ===
- John W. Bonner, incumbent Governor of Montana

=== Results ===
Democratic Party primary results
Party	Candidate	Votes	%
Democratic	John W. Bonner (incumbent)	71,597	100.00
Total votes		71,597	100.00

== Republican primary ==
=== Candidates ===
- J. Hugo Aronson, State Senator
- Leonard C. Young

=== Results ===
Republican Primary results
Party	Candidate	Votes	%
Republican	J. Hugo Aronson	56,391	72.02
Republican	Leonard C. Young	21,904	27.98
Total votes		78,295	100.00

== General election ==
=== Results ===
Montana gubernatorial election, 1952
Party	Candidate	Votes	%	±%
Republican	J. Hugo Aronson	134,423	50.96%	+7.10%
Democratic	John W. Bonner (incumbent)	129,369	49.04%	−6.69%
Majority		5,504	1.92%	−9.96%
Turnout		263,792		
Republican gain from Democratic		Swing		
