= George M. Gosman =

American politician

Member of the Montana Senate
- In office 1945–1951

19th Lieutenant Governor of Montana
- In office 1953–1957
- Governor: J. Hugo Aronson
- Preceded by: Paul C. Cannon
- Succeeded by: Paul C. Cannon

Personal details
- Born: October 19, 1893 Lima, Montana, U.S.
- Died: September 1, 1981 (aged 87) Dillon, Montana, U.S.
- Party: Republican
- Spouse(s): Zetta Gilbert; Donna Flanagan
- Education: University of Montana

George M. Gosman (October 19, 1893 – September 1, 1981) was an American politician. He served as lieutenant governor of Montana from 1953 to 1957.

== Life and career ==
Gosman was born in Lima, Montana, the son of Annie and Otto Gosman, a sheriff in Beaverhead County, Montana. He attended the University of Montana and served in the United States Army during World War I.

Gosman served in the Montana Senate from 1945 to 1951.

In 1952, Gosman was elected to the Montana lieutenant governorship, succeeding Paul C. Cannon. He served until 1957, when he was succeeded by Cannon.

Gosman died in September 1981 in Dillon, Montana, at the age of 87.
