= William Allen (Montana politician) =

American politician (1871–1953)

William R. Allen

Lieutenant Governor of Montana
- In office 1909–1913
- Governor: Edwin L. Norris
- Preceded by: Benjamin F. White
- Succeeded by: W. W. McDowell

Member of the Montana House of Representatives
- In office 1903–1906

Personal details
- Born: July 25, 1871 Anaconda, Montana
- Died: October 31, 1953 (aged 82)
- Party: Republican
- Spouse(s): Ethel Louis deMar; Elizabeth Berkin (d. 1917)

William R. Allen (July 25, 1871 – October 31, 1953) was an American politician and businessman. He was a member of the Montana House of Representatives from 1903 to 1906, and served as lieutenant governor under Edwin L. Norris between 1909 and 1913.

== Early life and political career ==
William R. Allen was born in French Gulch, near Anaconda, Montana, on July 25, 1871, to parents Cordelia Waddell Allen and William N. Allen. After his mother died, the younger Allen and his father split their time between French Gulch and a Mill Creek ranch. Allen graduated from local schools in Deer Lodge County and attended Helena Business College. Upon earning his degree in 1891, Allen helped his father run the French Gulch mine. Following his father's death in 1898, Allen began his own mining venture. In 1903, he was first elected to the Montana Legislature. That same year, Allen branched out into timber development. He won a second term in 1905, and later succeeded Benjamin F. White as lieutenant governor of Montana. He moved to Boston soon after the end of Edwin L. Norris's governorship and added real estate, fire insurance, banking, and railroads to his holdings. Allen founded the Boston and Montana Development Company in 1913, which became less profitable throughout the 1920s. That decade, Allen served as a delegate to the Republican National Conventions of 1920 and 1924. In 1940, he contested the Republican primary for a seat on the United States House of Representatives, losing to Jeannette Rankin.

== Personal life ==
Allen was first married to Elizabeth Berkin, with whom he had four children. After her death in 1917, Allen married Ethel Louis deMar. They had three children. Allen died on October 31, 1953, aged 82.
