= Frank Henry Cooney =

American politician

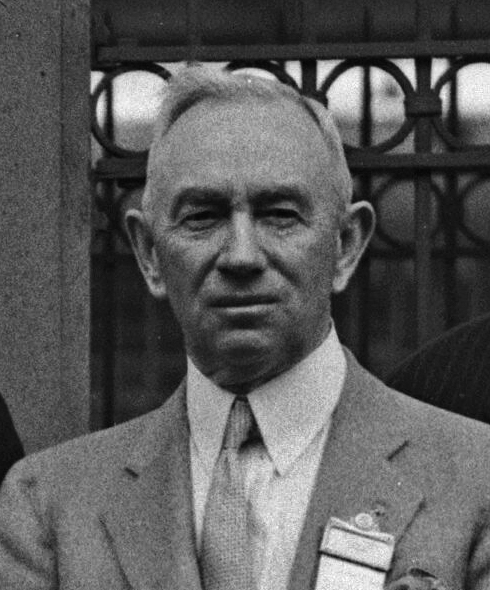

9th Governor of Montana
- In office March 13, 1933 – December 15, 1935
- Lieutenant: Tom Kane; Ernest T. Eaton; Elmer Holt
- Preceded by: John E. Erickson
- Succeeded by: Elmer Holt

11th Lieutenant Governor of Montana
- In office January 5, 1933 – March 13, 1933
- Governor: John E. Erickson
- Preceded by: Frank A. Hazelbaker
- Succeeded by: Tom Kane

Personal details
- Born: December 31, 1872 Norwood, Ontario, Canada
- Died: December 15, 1935 (aged 62) Great Falls, Montana, U.S.
- Party: Democratic
- Relations: Mike Cooney (grandson)

Frank Henry Cooney (December 31, 1872 – December 15, 1935) was a Canadian-American politician and businessman who served as the ninth governor of Montana from 1933 to 1935.

== Early life ==
Cooney was born in Norwood, Ontario, Canada, and received a limited education in Catholic schools. He dropped out of school at the age of fourteen and worked as a delivery boy in a grocery store and for a short time, he tried working with his father in the nursery business.

== Career ==
Cooney moved to Butte, Montana in July, 1891, and found employment in a grocery store. He then found a position in the wholesale department of the Davidson Grocery Company.

In 1894, Cooney and his brother, Howard C. Cooney, started the firm of Cooney Brothers. Later it was incorporated under the name of Cooney Brokerage company, a success from the beginning. The company continued to expand with the additions of livestock and agricultural holdings. He was public administrator for Silver Bow County, Montana from 1898 to 1900.

Elected lieutenant governor in 1932, Cooney served until March 13, 1933, when he assumed the duties of Governor John Edward Erickson, who resigned so that Cooney could appoint him to Thomas J. Walsh's senate seat after Walsh's untimely death. Cooney is credited for reforming the state liquor laws and establishing a water conservation program.

== Personal life ==
He married Emma May Poindexter Cooney on December 27, 1899, and the couple had seven children, Francis H, John Phillip, Mary Margaret, Walter Poindexter, twins, Tyler Thompson and Virginia Elizabeth and their youngest Gage Rodman.

Cooney died of heart failure on December 15, 1935, and was succeeded by Lieutenant Governor Elmer Holt. He is interred at Saint Mary Cemetery in Missoula. His grandson, Mike Cooney, is a politician who served as the 36th lieutenant governor of Montana.

== See also ==
- List of United States governors born outside the United States

Political offices
Preceded by Frank A. Hazelbacker	Lieutenant Governor of Montana; 1933	Succeeded by Tom Kane
Preceded by John E. Erickson	Governor of Montana; 1933–1935	Succeeded by Elmer Holt
