= Donald Grant Nutter =

American politician

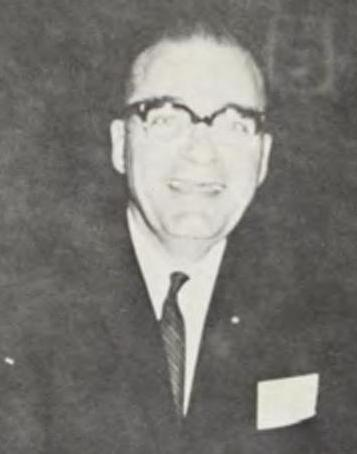

15th Governor of Montana
- In office January 4, 1961 – January 25, 1962
- Lieutenant: Tim Babcock
- Preceded by: J. Hugo Aronson
- Succeeded by: Tim Babcock

Member of the Montana Senate from the 7th district
- In office 1951–1959

Personal details
- Born: November 28, 1915 Lambert, Montana
- Died: January 25, 1962 (aged 46) Wolf Creek, Montana
- Party: Republican
- Spouse: Maxine Trotter
- Children: John Nutter
- Education: University of Montana

Military service
- Allegiance: United States
- Branch/service: United States Army Air Forces
- Years of service: 1943–1945
- Rank: Captain
- Battles/wars: World War II

Donald Grant Nutter (November 28, 1915 – January 25, 1962) was an American politician. A recipient of the Distinguished Flying Cross in World War II, Nutter served in the Montana Senate and as the chair of the state Republican Party prior to being elected the 15th governor of Montana in 1960. After a year in office, he was killed in an airplane crash during a blizzard in January 1962.

== Biography ==
=== Early life ===
Donald Nutter was born November 28, 1915, in Lambert, Montana, the second of three sons born to Chesley E. Nutter and Anne Grant (Wood) Nutter. The family moved to Sidney in 1918.

Nutter attended the North Dakota State School of Science in Wahpeton for two years before transferring to University of Montana in Missoula in 1935. He left school after his father became ill to return to Sidney, where he entered public service in 1937 as the deputy clerk of the Richland County District Court. He held that position for a year, then served for another year as the undersheriff of Richland County.

=== Marriage and children ===
Nutter met his wife, Maxine Trotter, at an ice cream shop where she worked with her parents. They were married in Lewistown on April 16, 1938, and had one son, John.

=== Career ===
Following their wedding, Nutter entered the farm equipment business in Sidney. He did well and moved his young family to Glasgow, where he managed a farm equipment sales company for two years.

With the outbreak of World War II, Nutter joined the Army Air Forces. As a B-24 bomber pilot, he flew 62 combat missions, logging more than 500 hours of combat time. He spent 13 months in the China-Burma-India Theater and was discharged at the rank of captain after 39 months of service.

He returned to eastern Montana and opened his own farm implement dealership in Sidney and in 1948 began working toward a law degree. Nutter was elected to the Montana State Senate in 1950, serving his eastern Montana constituents while attending law school in western Montana. In 1954, he was admitted to the Montana Bar and re-elected in the state senate. During his time in the statehouse, his position changed from "a cautious reactionary to a conscientious, business-minded liberal with a host of friends and supporters throughout the state".

After defeat as the incumbent seeking a third term, he served as the chairman of the Montana Republican Central Committee from 1958 to 1960. He secured the Republican gubernatorial nomination and was elected governor in November 1960. During his tenure, state spending was reduced and new industrial developments were promoted.

=== Death and legacy ===
On the night of January 25, 1962, Nutter was en route to a speaking engagement in Cut Bank when the C-47 Skytrain he was a passenger in crashed. Winds exceeding 100 mph sheared off one of the wings of the plane, causing the aircraft to go down in Wolf Creek Canyon north of Helena. Also killed in the crash were Dennis Gordon, his executive secretary; Edward Wren, commissioner of agriculture; and three members of the Montana Air National Guard: Maj. Clifford Hanson, Maj. Joseph Devine and Master Sgt. Charles Ballard.

Nutter's casket lay in state in Montana's Capitol House Chambers, flanked by the caskets of Wren and Gordon and under watch by two Montana National Guardsmen, prior to being interred in the Sidney City Cemetery in Sidney, Montana.

Elsewhere in Sidney, Nutter is remembered with a statue in Veterans Memorial Park and by the Donald G. Nutter Building, which is home to the Richland County Drivers Examiner and Probation & Parole.

At the Montana State Capitol in Helena, a bronze plaque outside the south entrance to the statehouse remembers Nutter and the others lost in the 1962 air crash.

== Works ==
=== Letters ===
Nutter's correspondence, press releases, and speeches are included in the Montana Governors records collection at the Montana Historical Society Research Center Archives in Helena, Montana.

== Awards ==
- Air Medal with cluster
- Distinguished Flying Cross with clusters

Party political offices
Preceded by J. Hugo Aronson	Republican nominee for Governor of Montana; 1960	Succeeded by Tim Babcock
Political offices
Preceded by J. Hugo Aronson	Governor of Montana; 1961 – 1962	Succeeded by Tim M. Babcock
