= Sam C. Ford =

American judge

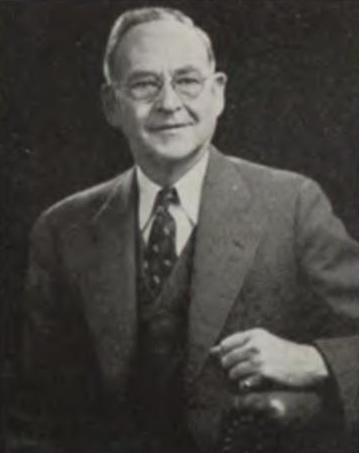

12th Governor of Montana
- In office January 6, 1941 – January 3, 1949
- Lieutenant: Ernest T. Eaton
- Preceded by: Roy E. Ayers
- Succeeded by: John W. Bonner

7th Attorney General of Montana
- In office 1917–1921
- Governor: Sam V. Stewart
- Preceded by: Joseph Poindexter
- Succeeded by: Wellington D. Rankin

Personal details
- Born: Samuel Clarance Ford; November 7, 1882 Albany, Kentucky, U.S.
- Died: November 25, 1961 (aged 79) Helena, Montana, U.S.
- Party: Republican
- Relations: Nancy Jackson, granddaughter
- Profession: Attorney

Samuel Clarence Ford (November 7, 1882 – November 25, 1961) was an American politician who served as the 12th Governor of Montana from 1941 to 1949.

== Biography ==
Ford was born on November 7, 1882, in Albany, Kentucky. His early education was in the public schools of Kansas and he graduated from the University of Kansas with an LL.B. in 1906. He established a legal practice as well as a public service career in Helena, Montana. He married Mary Leslie Shobe in 1910 and they had four children.

== Career ==
Ford was a member of the Republican Party. He served as Assistant U.S. Attorney for Montana from 1908 to 1914 and served as the Attorney General of Montana from 1917 to 1921. He was a Supreme Court Justice on the Montana State Supreme Court from 1929 to 1933.

Ford was elected Governor of Montana on November 5, 1940, narrowly defeating incumbent Governor Roy E. Ayers. In 1944, he was re-elected comfortably over Leif Erickson, the former Chief Justice of the Montana Supreme Court. Ford ran for re-election in 1948, but was defeated in the general election by former State Attorney General John W. Bonner, and retired from politics. During his tenure as governor, he reduced the state bureaucracy, balanced the budget, launched the Missouri River development project to provide cheap electricity to farmers. He was a delegate to the Republican National Convention in 1952.

== Death ==
Ford died in Helena on November 25, 1961, and he is interred at Forestvale Cemetery, Helena, Lewis and Clark County, Montana US.

Party political offices
Preceded by Frank A. Hazelbaker	Republican nominee for Governor of Montana; 1940, 1944, 1948	Succeeded by J. Hugo Aronson
Legal offices
Preceded by Joseph Poindexter	Attorney General of Montana; 1917–1921	Succeeded by Wellington D. Rankin
Political offices
Preceded by Roy E. Ayers	Governor of Montana; 1941–1949	Succeeded by John W. Bonner
