= John W. Bonner =

American judge

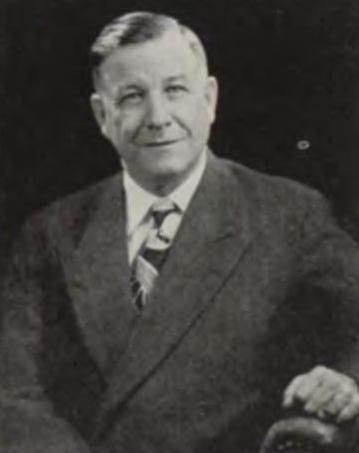

13th Governor of Montana
- In office January 3, 1949 – January 4, 1953
- Lieutenant: Paul C. Cannon
- Preceded by: Sam C. Ford
- Succeeded by: J. Hugo Aronson

Attorney General of Montana
- In office 1941–1942
- Governor: Sam C. Ford
- Preceded by: Harrison K. Freebourn
- Succeeded by: Howard M. Gullickson

Personal details
- Born: July 16, 1902 Butte, Montana, US
- Died: March 28, 1970 (aged 67) Helena, Montana, US
- Party: Democratic
- Spouse: Josephine A. Martin
- Children: 5
- Profession: Attorney

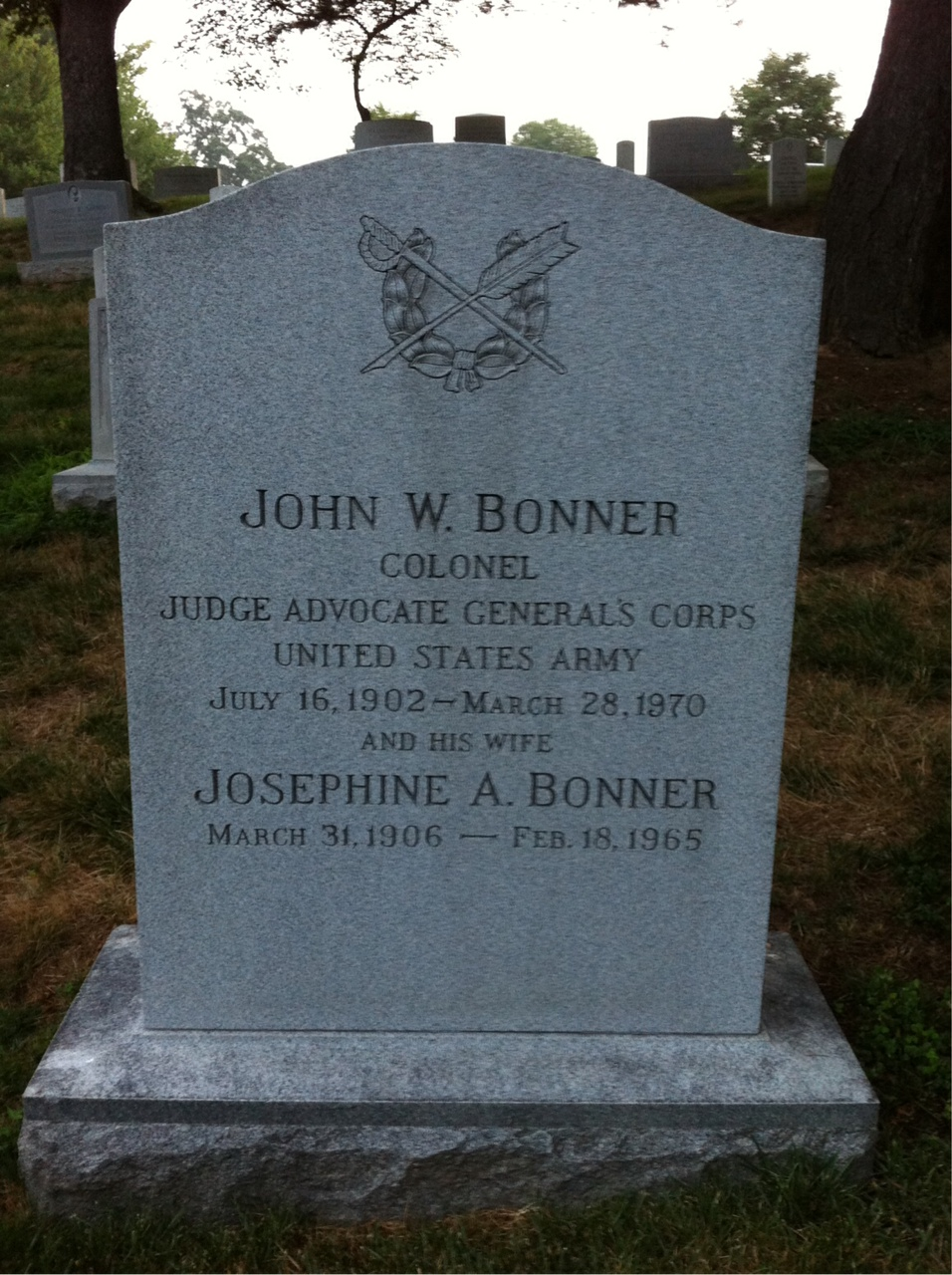
Grave at Arlington National Cemetery

John Woodrow Bonner (July 16, 1902 – March 28, 1970) was an American politician who served as the 13th Governor of Montana from January 3, 1949, to January 4, 1953. He was the first governor of Montana to be born in the 20th century.

== Biography ==
Bonner was born in Butte, Montana, and graduated from high school in Butte. He received both his undergraduate and law degree from Montana State University, which is now the University of Montana in Missoula. On February 3, 1929, he married Josephine Martin, and had five children, Jo, Jackie, Billie, Pat, and Tom, with her.

== Career ==
He served as counsel for the Montana Highway Commission from 1929 to 1936, and as attorney for the Railroad and Public Service Commission from 1936 to 1940.

He was Attorney General of Montana from 1941 to 1942. He resigned as attorney general to join the U.S. Army as a Major, during World War II. He was promoted to the rank of colonel, and received several medals for courageous service.

After he returned from the War, he ran for Governor of Montana in 1948, winning the Democratic primary and advancing to the general election, where he defeated incumbent Republican governor Sam C. Ford by a wide margin. Bonner ran for re-election in 1952, and he was narrowly defeated by State Senator J. Hugo Aronson. He ran for governor again in 1956, but lost the Democratic primary to Arnold Olsen, who ended up losing to Aronson in the general election. In 1960, when United States senator James E. Murray opted not to run for re-election, Bonner ran to succeed him, but, in a crowded primary, was defeated by Congressman Lee Metcalf, who would go on to serve in the United States Senate for three terms. From 1968 until his death, he served as an associate justice of the Montana Supreme Court.

== Death ==
Bonner died on March 28, 1970, and is interred at Arlington National Cemetery in Arlington, Virginia.

Party political offices
Preceded by Leif Erickson	Democratic nominee for Governor of Montana; 1948, 1952	Succeeded by Arnold Olsen
Legal offices
Preceded by Harrison K. Freebourn	Attorney General of Montana; 1941–1942	Succeeded by Howard M. Gullickson
Political offices
Preceded by Sam C. Ford	Governor of Montana; 1949–1953	Succeeded by J. Hugo Aronson
