= Elmer Holt =

American politician

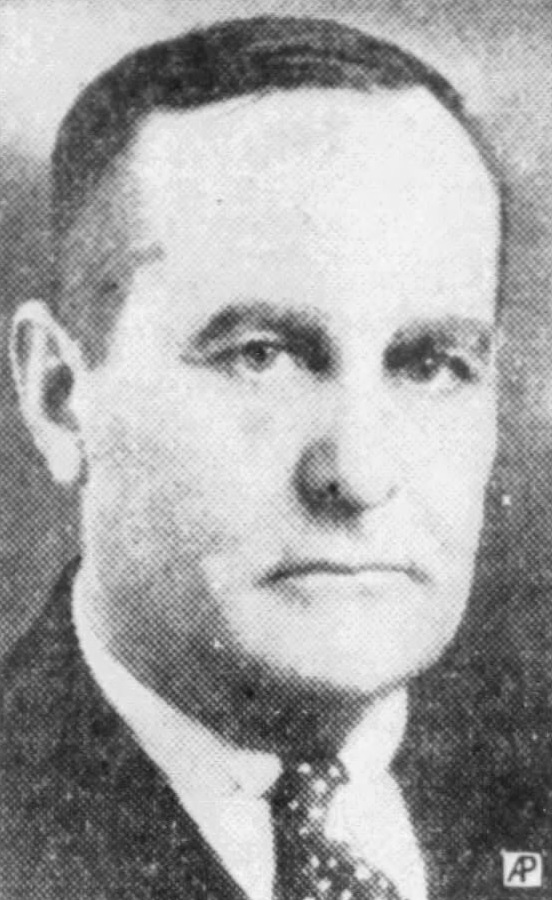

10th Governor of Montana
- In office December 15, 1935 – January 4, 1937
- Lieutenant: William P. Pilgeram
- Preceded by: Frank H. Cooney
- Succeeded by: Roy E. Ayers

Personal details
- Born: October 14, 1884 Savannah, Missouri, U.S.
- Died: March 1, 1945 (aged 60) Helena, Montana, U.S.
- Party: Democratic
- Education: University of Nebraska

William Elmer Holt (October 14, 1884 – March 1, 1945) was an American politician. He served as the tenth Governor of Montana from 1935 to 1937.

== Biography ==
Holt was born in Savannah, Missouri, and moved with his family to a ranch in Miles City, Montana. He graduated from the University of Nebraska in 1902. He married Lora Howe and they had two children.

== Career ==
Holt was elected to the Montana House of Representatives in 1912, and served one term. He was a member of the Montana State Senate from 1933 to 1935, and was chosen as president pro tempore in 1935. He became governor upon the death of Governor Frank Henry Cooney on December 15, 1935. Holt was defeated for reelection in 1936. He served as the delegate to Democratic National Convention from Montana in 1936.

Holt retired from political life, and later served as a land agent for Northern Pacific Railroad in Seattle, Washington.

== Death ==
Holt died on March 1, 1945, in Seattle, Washington, where he was with the Northern Pacific Land Office.

Political offices
Preceded by Frank Henry Cooney	Governor of Montana; 1935–1937	Succeeded by Roy E. Ayers
