= Montana Department of Justice =

State law enforcement agency of Montana

Department of Justice overview
- Jurisdiction: Montana
- Department of Justice executive: Austin Knudsen, Attorney General of Montana
- Website: Montana Department of Justice official website

The Montana Department of Justice is a state law enforcement agency of Montana. The Department is equivalent to the State Bureau of Investigation in other states.

The Montana Attorney General, currently Republican Austin Knudsen, heads the agency.

== Responsibilities ==
The Attorney General serves as 1 of 5 members of the state Land Board. The Land Board oversees the money generated from 5.2 million acres of land in the state.

The Montana Attorney General acts as the supervisor for the 56 County Attorneys in the State.

== Territorial attorneys general ==
- Thomas J. Lowry (1881–1882)
- John A. Johnston (1883–1884)
- William H. Hunt (1885–1887)
- William E. Cullen (1887–1889)
- John B. Clayberg (1889–1889)

== List of attorneys general since statehood ==
No.	Image	Attorney General	Party	Took office	Left office
1		Henri J. Haskell	Republican	November 8, 1889	January 4, 1897
2		C. B. Nolan		January 4, 1897	January 1, 1901
3		James Donovan		January 1, 1901	January 2, 1905
4		Albert J. Galen		January 2, 1905	January 6, 1913
5		D. M. Kelly		January 6, 1913	May 31, 1915
6		Joseph B. Poindexter	Democratic	May 31, 1915	January 1, 1917
7		Samuel C. Ford	Republican	January 1, 1917	January 3, 1921
8		Wellington D. Rankin	Republican	January 3, 1921	August 30, 1924
9		L. A. Foot		August 30, 1924	January 2, 1933
10		Raymond T. Nagle		January 2, 1933	January 2, 1933
11		Enor K. Matson		November 1, 1936	January 4, 1937
12		Harrison J. Freebourn		January 4, 1937	January 6, 1941
13		John W. Bonner	Democratic	January 6, 1941	May 1, 1942
14		Howard M. Gullickson		May 1, 1942	August 3, 1942
15		R. V. Bottomly		August 3, 1942	January 3, 1949
16		Arnold Olsen	Democratic	January 3, 1949	January 7, 1957
17		Forrest H. Anderson	Democratic	January 7, 1957	January 6, 1969
18		Robert I. Woodahl	Republican	January 6, 1969	January 3, 1977
19		Mike Greely	Democratic	January 3, 1977	January 2, 1989
20		Marc Racicot	Republican	January 2, 1989	January 4, 1993
21		Joseph P. Mazurek	Democratic	January 4, 1993	January 2, 2001
22		Mike McGrath	Democratic	January 2, 2001	January 5, 2009
23		Steve Bullock	Democratic	January 5, 2009	January 7, 2013
24		Timothy Fox	Republican	January 7, 2013	January 4, 2021
25		Austin Knudsen	Republican	January 4, 2021	
