= Political party strength in Montana =

Politics in the US state of Montana

The following table indicates the party of elected officials in the U.S. state of Montana:

- Governor
- Lieutenant Governor
- Secretary of State
- Attorney General
- State Treasurer
- State Auditor
- Superintendent of Public Instruction

The table also indicates the historical party composition in the:

- State Senate
- State House of Representatives
- State delegation to the United States Senate
- State delegation to the United States House of Representatives

For years in which a presidential election was held, the table indicates which party's nominees received the state's electoral votes.

== Pre-statehood (1864–1889) ==
Year	Executive offices	Territorial Legislature		U.S. Congress
Year	Governor	Senate	House	Delegate
1864	Sidney Edgerton (R)	[?]		no such office
1865	Thomas Francis Meagher (D) (Note: Acting.)	[?]		Samuel McLean (D)
1866	Green C. Smith (D)	[?]		Samuel McLean (D)
1867	Green C. Smith (D)	[?]		James M. Cavanaugh (D)
1868	James Tufts (R)	[?]		James M. Cavanaugh (D)
1869	James Mitchell Ashley (R)	[?]		James M. Cavanaugh (D)
1869	Wiley Scribner (R)	[?]		James M. Cavanaugh (D)
1870	Benjamin F. Potts (R)	[?]		James M. Cavanaugh (D)
1871	Benjamin F. Potts (R)	[?]		William H. Clagett (R)
1872	Benjamin F. Potts (R)	[?]		William H. Clagett (R)
1873	Benjamin F. Potts (R)	[?]		Martin Maginnis (D)
...	Benjamin F. Potts (R)	[?]		Martin Maginnis (D)
1882	Benjamin F. Potts (R)	[?]		Martin Maginnis (D)
1883	John Schuyler Crosby (R)	[?]		Martin Maginnis (D)
1884	B. Platt Carpenter (R)	[?]		Martin Maginnis (D)
1885	Samuel Thomas Hauser (D)	[?]		Joseph Toole (D)
1886	Samuel Thomas Hauser (D)	[?]		Joseph Toole (D)
1887	Preston Leslie (D)	[?]		Joseph Toole (D)
1888	Preston Leslie (D)	[?]		Joseph Toole (D)
1889	Benjamin F. White (R)	[?]		Thomas H. Carter (R) (Note: Delegate from Montana Territory until November 8, when Carter was elected U.S. Representative upon Montana statehood.)

== 1889–1976 ==
Year	Executive offices							State Legislature		United States Congress			Electoral votes
Year	Governor	Lt. Governor	Secretary of State	Attorney General	Treasurer	Auditor	Supt. of Pub. Inst.	Senate	House	Senator (Class I)	Senator (Class II)	House	Electoral votes
1889	Joseph Toole (D)	John E. Rickards (R)	Louis Rotwitt (R)	Henri J. Haskell (R)	Richard O. Hickman (R)	Edwin A. Kenney (R)	John; Gannon	8D, 8R (Note: With a Republican Lt. Governor, the GOP organized the chamber. There was no President Pro Tempore that session.)	25R, 25D (Note: There were five contested seats from Silver Bow County, and due to a lack of a contested election resolution mechanism, the Republicans and Democrats each organized their own House with the contested members of both parties from Silver Bow joining their respective parties in those chambers, and both sent bills to the Senate.)	Wilbur F. Sanders (R)	Thomas C. Power (R)	Thomas H. Carter (R)	
1890	Joseph Toole (D)	John E. Rickards (R)	Louis Rotwitt (R)	Henri J. Haskell (R)	Richard O. Hickman (R)	Edwin A. Kenney (R)	John; Gannon	8D, 8R	25R, 25D	Wilbur F. Sanders (R)	Thomas C. Power (R)	Thomas H. Carter (R)	
1891	Joseph Toole (D)	John E. Rickards (R)	Louis Rotwitt (R)	Henri J. Haskell (R)	Richard O. Hickman (R)	Edwin A. Kenney (R)	John; Gannon	10D, 6R	28R, 27D	Wilbur F. Sanders (R)	Thomas C. Power (R)	William W. Dixon (D)	
1892	Joseph Toole (D)	John E. Rickards (R)	Louis Rotwitt (R)	Henri J. Haskell (R)	Richard O. Hickman (R)	Edwin A. Kenney (R)	John; Gannon	10D, 6R	28R, 27D	Wilbur F. Sanders (R)	Thomas C. Power (R)	William W. Dixon (D)	Harrison/ Reid (R) ✗
1893	John E. Rickards (R)	Alexander Campbell; Botkin (R)	Louis Rotwitt (R)	Henri J. Haskell (R)	Frederick W. Wright (R)	Andrew B. Cook (R)	Eugene A. Steere (R)	9D, 7R	26D, 26R, 3Pop (Note: A coalition of Democrats and Populists elected a Populist, Thomas Matthews, as Speaker and organized the chamber.)	vacant (Note: Legislature failed to elect a Senator at the beginning of the 53rd United States Congress.)	Thomas C. Power (R)	Charles S. Hartman (R)	Harrison/ Reid (R) ✗
1894	John E. Rickards (R)	Alexander Campbell; Botkin (R)	Louis Rotwitt (R)	Henri J. Haskell (R)	Frederick W. Wright (R)	Andrew B. Cook (R)	Eugene A. Steere (R)	9D, 7R	26D, 26R, 3Pop	vacant	Thomas C. Power (R)	Charles S. Hartman (R)	Harrison/ Reid (R) ✗
1895	John E. Rickards (R)	Alexander Campbell; Botkin (R)	Louis Rotwitt (R)	Henri J. Haskell (R)	Frederick W. Wright (R)	Andrew B. Cook (R)	Eugene A. Steere (R)	13R, 5D, 2Pop, 1Fus	44R, 14Pop, 3D	Lee Mantle (R) (Note: Initially appointed to fill a vacancy.)	Thomas H. Carter (R)	Charles S. Hartman (R)	Harrison/ Reid (R) ✗
1896	John E. Rickards (R)	Alexander Campbell; Botkin (R)	Louis Rotwitt (R)	Henri J. Haskell (R)	Frederick W. Wright (R)	Andrew B. Cook (R)	Eugene A. Steere (R)	13R, 5D, 2Pop, 1Fus	44R, 14Pop, 3D	Lee Mantle (SvR)	Thomas H. Carter (R)	Charles S. Hartman (R)	2 – Bryan/ Sewall (D/Sv) ✗ 1 – Bryan/ Watson (Pop) ✗
1897	Robert Burns Smith (D/Pop)	Archibald E. Spriggs (D)	Thomas S. Hogan (Pop)	C. B. Nolan (D)	Timothy E. Collins (D)	Thomas W. Poindexter Jr. (D)	Evans A. Carleton (R)	12R, 8D, 3Pop	42D, 18Pop, 8R	Lee Mantle (SvR)	Thomas H. Carter (R)	Charles S. Hartman (R)	2 – Bryan/ Sewall (D/Sv) ✗ 1 – Bryan/ Watson (Pop) ✗
1898	Robert Burns Smith (D/Pop)	Archibald E. Spriggs (D)	Thomas S. Hogan (Pop)	C. B. Nolan (D)	Timothy E. Collins (D)	Thomas W. Poindexter Jr. (D)	Evans A. Carleton (R)	12R, 8D, 3Pop	42D, 18Pop, 8R	Lee Mantle (SvR)	Thomas H. Carter (R)	Charles S. Hartman (R)	2 – Bryan/ Sewall (D/Sv) ✗ 1 – Bryan/ Watson (Pop) ✗
1899	Robert Burns Smith (D/Pop)	Archibald E. Spriggs (D)	Thomas S. Hogan (Pop)	C. B. Nolan (D)	Timothy E. Collins (D)	Thomas W. Poindexter Jr. (D)	Evans A. Carleton (R)	17D, 6R, 1Pop	57D, 9R, 4SvR	William A. Clark (D) (Note: Resigned May 15, 1900 to avoid claim of election fraud.)	Thomas H. Carter (R)	Albert J. Campbell (D)	2 – Bryan/ Sewall (D/Sv) ✗ 1 – Bryan/ Watson (Pop) ✗
1900	Robert Burns Smith (D/Pop)	Archibald E. Spriggs (D)	Thomas S. Hogan (Pop)	C. B. Nolan (D)	Timothy E. Collins (D)	Thomas W. Poindexter Jr. (D)	Evans A. Carleton (R)	17D, 6R, 1Pop	57D, 9R, 4SvR	vacant	Thomas H. Carter (R)	Albert J. Campbell (D)	Bryan/ Stevenson (D) ✗
1901	Joseph Toole (D) (Note: Resigned due to declining health.)	Frank G. Higgins (D)	George M. Hayes (D)	James Donovan (D)	A. H. Barret (D)	James H. Calderhead (Pop)	W. W. Welch (D)	14D, 9R, 1Pop	28D, 23R, 8Lab, 6Pop, 5ID (Note: A coalition of Democrats, Labor, Populists, and Independent Democrats chose a Democrat, Frank Corbett, as Speaker, and organized the chamber.)	Paris Gibson (D)	William A. Clark (D)	Caldwell; Edwards (Pop)	Bryan/ Stevenson (D) ✗
1902	Joseph Toole (D)	Frank G. Higgins (D)	George M. Hayes (D)	James Donovan (D)	A. H. Barret (D)	James H. Calderhead (Pop)	W. W. Welch (D)	14D, 9R, 1Pop	28D, 23R, 8Lab, 6Pop, 5ID	Paris Gibson (D)	William A. Clark (D)	Caldwell; Edwards (Pop)	Bryan/ Stevenson (D) ✗
1903	Joseph Toole (D)	Frank G. Higgins (D)	George M. Hayes (D)	James Donovan (D)	A. H. Barret (D)	James H. Calderhead (Pop)	W. W. Welch (D)	14D, 12R	47R, 11Lab, 8D, 6A-T	Paris Gibson (D)	William A. Clark (D)	Joseph M. Dixon (R)	Bryan/ Stevenson (D) ✗
1904	Joseph Toole (D)	Frank G. Higgins (D)	George M. Hayes (D)	James Donovan (D)	A. H. Barret (D)	James H. Calderhead (Pop)	W. W. Welch (D)	14D, 12R	47R, 11Lab, 8D, 6A-T	Paris Gibson (D)	William A. Clark (D)	Joseph M. Dixon (R)	Roosevelt/ Fairbanks (R) ✓
1905	Joseph Toole (D)	Edwin L. Norris (D)	Abraham N. Yoder (R) (Note: Died in office.)	Albert J. Galen (R)	James H. Rice (R)	Henry R. Cunningham (R)	Wilfred E. Harmon (R)	16R, 10D	38R, 24D, 7Lab, 3A-T	Thomas H. Carter (R)	William A. Clark (D)	Joseph M. Dixon (R)	Roosevelt/ Fairbanks (R) ✓
1906	Joseph Toole (D)	Edwin L. Norris (D)	Abraham N. Yoder (R)	Albert J. Galen (R)	James H. Rice (R)	Henry R. Cunningham (R)	Wilfred E. Harmon (R)	16R, 10D	38R, 24D, 7Lab, 3A-T	Thomas H. Carter (R)	William A. Clark (D)	Joseph M. Dixon (R)	Roosevelt/ Fairbanks (R) ✓
1907	Joseph Toole (D)	Edwin L. Norris (D)	Abraham N. Yoder (R)	Albert J. Galen (R)	James H. Rice (R)	Henry R. Cunningham (R)	Wilfred E. Harmon (R)	18R, 9D	57R, 16D	Thomas H. Carter (R)	Joseph M. Dixon (R)	Charles; Nelson; Pray (R)	Roosevelt/ Fairbanks (R) ✓
1908	Edwin L. Norris (D) (Note: As lieutenant governor, filled unexpired term, and was later elected in his own right.)	Benjamin F. White (R)	Abraham N. Yoder (R)	Albert J. Galen (R)	James H. Rice (R)	Henry R. Cunningham (R)	Wilfred E. Harmon (R)	18R, 9D	57R, 16D	Thomas H. Carter (R)	Joseph M. Dixon (R)	Charles; Nelson; Pray (R)	Taft/ Sherman (R) ✓
1909	Edwin L. Norris (D)	William Allen (R)	Abraham N. Yoder (R)	Albert J. Galen (R)	Elmer E. Esselstyn (R)	Henry R. Cunningham (R)	Wilfred E. Harmon (R)	17R, 10D	38D, 33R	Thomas H. Carter (R)	Joseph M. Dixon (R)	Charles; Nelson; Pray (R)	Taft/ Sherman (R) ✓
1910	Edwin L. Norris (D)	William Allen (R)	Abraham N. Yoder (R)	Albert J. Galen (R)	Elmer E. Esselstyn (R)	Henry R. Cunningham (R)	Wilfred E. Harmon (R)	17R, 10D	38D, 33R	Thomas H. Carter (R)	Joseph M. Dixon (R)	Charles; Nelson; Pray (R)	Taft/ Sherman (R) ✓
1911	Edwin L. Norris (D)	William Allen (R)	Abraham N. Yoder (R)	Albert J. Galen (R)	Elmer E. Esselstyn (R)	C. M. McCoy	Wilfred E. Harmon (R)	16R, 12D	42D, 32R	Henry L. Myers (D)	Joseph M. Dixon (R)	Charles; Nelson; Pray (R)	Taft/ Sherman (R) ✓
1912	Edwin L. Norris (D)	William Allen (R)	Thomas M. Swindlehurst (D)	Albert J. Galen (R)	Elmer E. Esselstyn (R)	C. M. McCoy	Wilfred E. Harmon (R)	16R, 12D	42D, 32R	Henry L. Myers (D)	Joseph M. Dixon (R)	Charles; Nelson; Pray (R)	Wilson/ Marshall (D) ✓
1913	Sam V. Stewart (D)	W. W. McDowell (D)	Adelbert M. Alderson (D)	Daniel M. Kelly (D)	William C. Rae (D)	William; Keating (D)	Henry A. Davee (D)	17D, 13R, 2Prog	49D, 20R, 16Prog, 1Sv	Henry L. Myers (D)	Thomas J. Walsh (D)	2D	Wilson/ Marshall (D) ✓
1914	Sam V. Stewart (D)	W. W. McDowell (D)	Adelbert M. Alderson (D)	Daniel M. Kelly (D)	William C. Rae (D)	William; Keating (D)	Henry A. Davee (D)	17D, 13R, 2Prog	49D, 20R, 16Prog, 1Sv	Henry L. Myers (D)	Thomas J. Walsh (D)	2D	Wilson/ Marshall (D) ✓
1915	Sam V. Stewart (D)	W. W. McDowell (D)	Adelbert M. Alderson (D)	Joseph Poindexter (D)	William C. Rae (D)	William; Keating (D)	Henry A. Davee (D)	19R, 16D, 5Prog, 1I (Note: A coalition of Republicans and Progressives elected a Republican, John Edwards, as President Pro Tempore and organized the chamber.)	55D, 36R, 3Sv, 1I	Henry L. Myers (D)	Thomas J. Walsh (D)	2D	Wilson/ Marshall (D) ✓
1916	Sam V. Stewart (D)	W. W. McDowell (D)	Adelbert M. Alderson (D)	Joseph Poindexter (D)	William C. Rae (D)	William; Keating (D)	Henry A. Davee (D)	19R, 16D, 5Prog, 1I	55D, 36R, 3Sv, 1I	Henry L. Myers (D)	Thomas J. Walsh (D)	2D	Wilson/ Marshall (D) ✓
1917	Sam V. Stewart (D)	W. W. McDowell (D)	Charles T. Stewart (R) (Note: Impeached and then resigned.)	Sam C. Ford (R)	H. L. Hart (R)	Rufus G. Poland (D)	May; Trumper (R)	28R, 13D	49D, 46R	Henry L. Myers (D)	Thomas J. Walsh (D)	1D, 1R	Wilson/ Marshall (D) ✓
1918	Sam V. Stewart (D)	W. W. McDowell (D)	Charles T. Stewart (R)	Sam C. Ford (R)	H. L. Hart (R)	Rufus G. Poland (D)	May; Trumper (R)	28R, 13D	49D, 46R	Henry L. Myers (D)	Thomas J. Walsh (D)	1D, 1R	Wilson/ Marshall (D) ✓
1919	Sam V. Stewart (D)	W. W. McDowell (D)	Charles T. Stewart (R)	Sam C. Ford (R)	H. L. Hart (R)	George P. Porter (R)	May; Trumper (R)	31R, 12D	65R, 33D	Henry L. Myers (D)	Thomas J. Walsh (D)	1D, 1R	Wilson/ Marshall (D) ✓
1920	Sam V. Stewart (D)	W. W. McDowell (D)	Charles T. Stewart (R)	Sam C. Ford (R)	H. L. Hart (R)	George P. Porter (R)	May; Trumper (R)	31R, 12D	65R, 33D	Henry L. Myers (D)	Thomas J. Walsh (D)	1D, 1R	Harding/ Coolidge (R) ✓
1921	Joseph M. Dixon (R)	Nelson Story Jr. (R)	Charles T. Stewart (R)	Wellington D. Rankin (R)	J. W. Walker	George P. Porter (R)	May; Trumper (R)	41R, 13D	98R, 9D, 1I	Henry L. Myers (D)	Thomas J. Walsh (D)	2R	Harding/ Coolidge (R) ✓
1922	Joseph M. Dixon (R)	Nelson Story Jr. (R)	Charles T. Stewart (R)	Wellington D. Rankin (R)	J. W. Walker	George P. Porter (R)	May; Trumper (R)	41R, 13D	98R, 9D, 1I	Henry L. Myers (D)	Thomas J. Walsh (D)	2R	Harding/ Coolidge (R) ✓
1923	Joseph M. Dixon (R)	Nelson Story Jr. (R)	Charles T. Stewart (R)	Wellington D. Rankin (R)	O. H. Junod (R)	George P. Porter (R)	May; Trumper (R)	38R, 16D	56R, 44D	Burton K. Wheeler (D)	Thomas J. Walsh (D)	1D, 1R	Harding/ Coolidge (R) ✓
1924	Joseph M. Dixon (R)	Nelson Story Jr. (R)	Charles T. Stewart (R)	Wellington D. Rankin (R)	O. H. Junod (R)	George P. Porter (R)	May; Trumper (R)	38R, 16D	56R, 44D	Burton K. Wheeler (D)	Thomas J. Walsh (D)	1D, 1R	Coolidge/ Dawes (R) ✓
1925	John E. Erickson (D) (Note: Resigned so that his successor could appoint him to the United States Senate.)	W. S. McCormack (R)	Charles T. Stewart (R)	L. A. Foot (R)	Wilfred E. Harmon (R)	George P. Porter (R)	May; Trumper (R)	39R, 16D, 1FL	66R, 34D, 2FL	Burton K. Wheeler (D)	Thomas J. Walsh (D)	1D, 1R	Coolidge/ Dawes (R) ✓
1926	John E. Erickson (D)	W. S. McCormack (R)	Charles T. Stewart (R)	L. A. Foot (R)	Wilfred E. Harmon (R)	George P. Porter (R)	May; Trumper (R)	39R, 16D, 1FL	66R, 34D, 2FL	Burton K. Wheeler (D)	Thomas J. Walsh (D)	1D, 1R	Coolidge/ Dawes (R) ✓
1927	John E. Erickson (D)	W. S. McCormack (R)	Robert N. Hawkins (D) (Note: Resigned.)	L. A. Foot (R)	Wilfred E. Harmon (R)	George P. Porter (R)	May; Trumper (R)	40R, 15D, 1FL	61R, 39D, 2FL	Burton K. Wheeler (D)	Thomas J. Walsh (D)	1D, 1R	Coolidge/ Dawes (R) ✓
1927	John E. Erickson (D)	W. S. McCormack (R)	William Powers	L. A. Foot (R)	Wilfred E. Harmon (R)	George P. Porter (R)	May; Trumper (R)	40R, 15D, 1FL	61R, 39D, 2FL	Burton K. Wheeler (D)	Thomas J. Walsh (D)	1D, 1R	Coolidge/ Dawes (R) ✓
1928	John E. Erickson (D)	W. S. McCormack (R)	John W. Mountjoy (D)	L. A. Foot (R)	Wilfred E. Harmon (R)	George P. Porter (R)	May; Trumper (R)	40R, 15D, 1FL	61R, 39D, 2FL	Burton K. Wheeler (D)	Thomas J. Walsh (D)	1D, 1R	Hoover/ Curtis (R) ✓
1929	John E. Erickson (D)	Frank A. Hazelbacker (R)	William E. Harmon (R)	L. A. Foot (R)	F. E. Williams (R)	George P. Porter (R)	Elizabeth; Ireland (R)	39R, 16D, 1FL	69R, 33D	Burton K. Wheeler (D)	Thomas J. Walsh (D)	1D, 1R	Hoover/ Curtis (R) ✓
1930	John E. Erickson (D)	Frank A. Hazelbacker (R)	William E. Harmon (R)	L. A. Foot (R)	F. E. Williams (R)	George P. Porter (R)	Elizabeth; Ireland (R)	39R, 16D, 1FL	69R, 33D	Burton K. Wheeler (D)	Thomas J. Walsh (D)	1D, 1R	Hoover/ Curtis (R) ✓
1931	John E. Erickson (D)	Frank A. Hazelbacker (R)	William E. Harmon (R)	L. A. Foot (R)	F. E. Williams (R)	George P. Porter (R)	Elizabeth; Ireland (R)	41R, 15D	59R, 43D	Burton K. Wheeler (D)	Thomas J. Walsh (D)	1D, 1R	Hoover/ Curtis (R) ✓
1932	John E. Erickson (D)	Frank A. Hazelbacker (R)	William E. Harmon (R)	L. A. Foot (R)	F. E. Williams (R)	George P. Porter (R)	Elizabeth; Ireland (R)	41R, 15D	59R, 43D	Burton K. Wheeler (D)	Thomas J. Walsh (D)	1D, 1R	Roosevelt/ Garner (D) ✓
1933	John E. Erickson (D)	Frank Henry Cooney (D)	Sam W. Mitchell (D)	Raymond T. Nagle (D)	James Brett (D)	John J. Holmes (D)	Elizabeth; Ireland (R)	33R, 22D, 1I	72D, 30R	Burton K. Wheeler (D)	John E. Erickson (D)	2D	Roosevelt/ Garner (D) ✓
1933	Frank Henry Cooney (D) (Note: As lieutenant governor, filled unexpired term.)	Tom Kane (R)	Sam W. Mitchell (D)	Raymond T. Nagle (D)	James Brett (D)	John J. Holmes (D)	Elizabeth; Ireland (R)	33R, 22D, 1I	72D, 30R	Burton K. Wheeler (D)	John E. Erickson (D)	2D	Roosevelt/ Garner (D) ✓
1934	Frank Henry Cooney (D)	Tom Kane (R)	Sam W. Mitchell (D)	Raymond T. Nagle (D)	James Brett (D)	John J. Holmes (D)	Elizabeth; Ireland (R)	33R, 22D, 1I	72D, 30R	Burton K. Wheeler (D)	John E. Erickson (D)	2D	Roosevelt/ Garner (D) ✓
1935	Frank Henry Cooney (D)	Ernest T. Eaton (R)	Sam W. Mitchell (D)	Raymond T. Nagle (D)	James Brett (D)	John J. Holmes (D)	Elizabeth; Ireland (R)	28D, 27R, 1I (Note: A bipartisan coalition elected a Republican, Ernest T. Eaton, as President Pro Tempore, and organized the chamber on a bipartisan basis. In practice, Eaton served as President of the Senate, and as such Lt. Governor, as the previous one, Frank Cooney was serving as Governor. After session, Eaton resigned, and the position of President of the Senate and Lt. Governor was filled by Democrat Elmer Holt.)	69D, 33R	Burton K. Wheeler (D)	James E. Murray (D)	2D	Roosevelt/ Garner (D) ✓
1936	Elmer Holt (D) (Note: As President of the State Senate, filled unexpired term. The Speaker of the House, William Pilgeram, took up his previous position of Lt. Governor.)	William R. Pilgeram (D)	Sam W. Mitchell (D)	Enor K. Matson (D)	James Brett (D)	John J. Holmes (D)	Elizabeth; Ireland (R)	28D, 27R, 1I	69D, 33R	Burton K. Wheeler (D)	James E. Murray (D)	2D	Roosevelt/ Garner (D) ✓
1937	Roy E. Ayers (D)	Hugh R. Adnair (D)	Sam W. Mitchell (D)	Harrison J. Freebourn (D)	Ray Shannon (D)	John J. Holmes (D)	Ruth; Reardon (D)	29D, 27R	81D, 21R	Burton K. Wheeler (D)	James E. Murray (D)	2D	Roosevelt/ Garner (D) ✓
1938	Roy E. Ayers (D)	Hugh R. Adnair (D)	Sam W. Mitchell (D)	Harrison J. Freebourn (D)	Ray Shannon (D)	John J. Holmes (D)	Ruth; Reardon (D)	29D, 27R	81D, 21R	Burton K. Wheeler (D)	James E. Murray (D)	2D	Roosevelt/ Garner (D) ✓
1939	Roy E. Ayers (D)	Hugh R. Adnair (D)	Sam W. Mitchell (D)	Harrison J. Freebourn (D)	Ray Shannon (D)	John J. Holmes (D)	Ruth; Reardon (D)	31D, 25R	58D, 44R	Burton K. Wheeler (D)	James E. Murray (D)	1D, 1R	Roosevelt/ Garner (D) ✓
1940	Roy E. Ayers (D)	Hugh R. Adnair (D)	Sam W. Mitchell (D)	Harrison J. Freebourn (D)	Ray Shannon (D)	John J. Holmes (D)	Ruth; Reardon (D)	31D, 25R	58D, 44R	Burton K. Wheeler (D)	James E. Murray (D)	1D, 1R	Roosevelt/ Wallace (D) ✓
1941	Sam C. Ford (R)	Ernest T. Eaton (R)	Sam W. Mitchell (D)	John W. Bonner (D)	Thomas E. Carey (D)	John J. Holmes (D)	Elizabeth; Ireland (R)	35R, 21D	55D, 47R	Burton K. Wheeler (D)	James E. Murray (D)	1D, 1R	Roosevelt/ Wallace (D) ✓
1942	Sam C. Ford (R)	Ernest T. Eaton (R)	Sam W. Mitchell (D)	Howard M. Gullickson (D)	Thomas E. Carey (D)	John J. Holmes (D)	Elizabeth; Ireland (R)	35R, 21D	55D, 47R	Burton K. Wheeler (D)	James E. Murray (D)	1D, 1R	Roosevelt/ Wallace (D) ✓
1943	Sam C. Ford (R)	Ernest T. Eaton (R)	Sam W. Mitchell (D)	R. V. Bottomly (D)	Thomas E. Carey (D)	John J. Holmes (D)	Elizabeth; Ireland (R)	37R, 19D	51R, 39D	Burton K. Wheeler (D)	James E. Murray (D)	2D	Roosevelt/ Wallace (D) ✓
1944	Sam C. Ford (R)	Ernest T. Eaton (R)	Sam W. Mitchell (D)	R. V. Bottomly (D)	T. H. MacDonald (R)	John J. Holmes (D)	Elizabeth; Ireland (R)	37R, 19D	51R, 39D	Burton K. Wheeler (D)	James E. Murray (D)	2D	Roosevelt/ Truman (D) ✓
1945	Sam C. Ford (R)	Ernest T. Eaton (R)	Sam W. Mitchell (D)	R. V. Bottomly (D)	George P. Porter (R)	John J. Holmes (D)	Elizabeth; Ireland (R)	39R, 17D	53R, 37D	Burton K. Wheeler (D)	James E. Murray (D)	1D, 1R	Roosevelt/ Truman (D) ✓
1946	Sam C. Ford (R)	Ernest T. Eaton (R)	Sam W. Mitchell (D)	R. V. Bottomly (D)	George P. Porter (R)	John J. Holmes (D)	Elizabeth; Ireland (R)	39R, 17D	53R, 37D	Burton K. Wheeler (D)	James E. Murray (D)	1D, 1R	Roosevelt/ Truman (D) ✓
1947	Sam C. Ford (R)	Ernest T. Eaton (R)	Sam W. Mitchell (D)	R. V. Bottomly (D)	George P. Porter (R)	John J. Holmes (D)	Elizabeth; Ireland (R)	41R, 15D	58R, 31D, 1ID	Zales Ecton (R)	James E. Murray (D)	1D, 1R	Roosevelt/ Truman (D) ✓
1948	Sam C. Ford (R)	Ernest T. Eaton (R)	Sam W. Mitchell (D)	R. V. Bottomly (D)	George P. Porter (R)	John J. Holmes (D)	Elizabeth; Ireland (R)	41R, 15D	58R, 31D, 1ID	Zales Ecton (R)	James E. Murray (D)	1D, 1R	Truman/ Barkley (D) ✓
1949	John W. Bonner (D)	Paul Cannon (D)	Sam W. Mitchell (D)	Arnold Olsen (D)	Neil Fisher (D)	John J. Holmes (D)	Mary M. Condon (D)	31R, 23D, 2I	54D, 36R	Zales Ecton (R)	James E. Murray (D)	1D, 1R	Truman/ Barkley (D) ✓
1950	John W. Bonner (D)	Paul Cannon (D)	Sam W. Mitchell (D)	Arnold Olsen (D)	Alta E. Fisher (D)	John J. Holmes (D)	Mary M. Condon (D)	31R, 23D, 2I	54D, 36R	Zales Ecton (R)	James E. Murray (D)	1D, 1R	Truman/ Barkley (D) ✓
1951	John W. Bonner (D)	Paul Cannon (D)	Sam W. Mitchell (D)	Arnold Olsen (D)	John E. Henry (R)	John J. Holmes (D)	Mary M. Condon (D)	28R, 26D, 2I	49R, 41D	Zales Ecton (R)	James E. Murray (D)	1D, 1R	Truman/ Barkley (D) ✓
1952	John W. Bonner (D)	Paul Cannon (D)	Sam W. Mitchell (D)	Arnold Olsen (D)	John E. Henry (R)	John J. Holmes (D)	Mary M. Condon (D)	28R, 26D, 2I	49R, 41D	Zales Ecton (R)	James E. Murray (D)	1D, 1R	Eisenhower/ Nixon (R) ✓
1953	J. Hugo Aronson (R)	George M. Gosman (R)	Sam W. Mitchell (D)	Arnold Olsen (D)	Charles L. Sheridan (R)	John J. Holmes (D)	Mary M. Condon (D)	36R, 20D	62R, 32D	Mike Mansfield (D)	James E. Murray (D)	1D, 1R	Eisenhower/ Nixon (R) ✓
1954	J. Hugo Aronson (R)	George M. Gosman (R)	Sam W. Mitchell (D)	Arnold Olsen (D)	Edna Hinman (R)	John J. Holmes (D)	Mary M. Condon (D)	36R, 20D	62R, 32D	Mike Mansfield (D)	James E. Murray (D)	1D, 1R	Eisenhower/ Nixon (R) ✓
1955	J. Hugo Aronson (R)	George M. Gosman (R)	Sam W. Mitchell (D)	Arnold Olsen (D)	Edna Hinman (R)	John J. Holmes (D)	Mary M. Condon (D)	33R, 23D	49D, 45R	Mike Mansfield (D)	James E. Murray (D)	1D, 1R	Eisenhower/ Nixon (R) ✓
1956	J. Hugo Aronson (R)	George M. Gosman (R)	S. C. Arnold (R)	Arnold Olsen (D)	Edna Hinman (R)	John J. Holmes (D)	Mary M. Condon (D)	33R, 23D	49D, 45R	Mike Mansfield (D)	James E. Murray (D)	1D, 1R	Eisenhower/ Nixon (R) ✓
1957	J. Hugo Aronson (R)	Paul Cannon (D)	Frank Murray (D)	Forrest H. Anderson (D)	Horace Casey (D)	John J. Holmes (D)	Harriet; Miller (R)	31D, 25R	59D, 35R	Mike Mansfield (D)	James E. Murray (D)	2D	Eisenhower/ Nixon (R) ✓
1958	J. Hugo Aronson (R)	Paul Cannon (D)	Frank Murray (D)	Forrest H. Anderson (D)	Horace Casey (D)	John J. Holmes (D)	Harriet; Miller (R)	31D, 25R	59D, 35R	Mike Mansfield (D)	James E. Murray (D)	2D	Eisenhower/ Nixon (R) ✓
1959	J. Hugo Aronson (R)	Paul Cannon (D)	Frank Murray (D)	Forrest H. Anderson (D)	Horace Casey (D)	John J. Holmes (D)	Harriet; Miller (R)	38D, 17R, 1I	61D, 31R, 2I	Mike Mansfield (D)	James E. Murray (D)	2D	Eisenhower/ Nixon (R) ✓
1960	J. Hugo Aronson (R)	Paul Cannon (D)	Frank Murray (D)	Forrest H. Anderson (D)	Horace Casey (D)	John J. Holmes (D)	Harriet; Miller (R)	38D, 17R, 1I	61D, 31R, 2I	Mike Mansfield (D)	James E. Murray (D)	2D	Nixon/ Lodge (R) ✗
1961	Donald G. Nutter (R)	Tim Babcock (R)	Frank Murray (D)	Forrest H. Anderson (D)	Edna Hinman (R)	John J. Holmes (D)	Harriet; Miller (R)	38D, 17R, 1I	54R, 40D	Mike Mansfield (D)	Lee Metcalf (D)	1D, 1R	Nixon/ Lodge (R) ✗
1962	Tim Babcock (R)	David F. James (R)	Frank Murray (D)	Forrest H. Anderson (D)	Edna Hinman (R)	E. V. "Sonny"; Omholt (R)	Harriet; Miller (R)	38D, 17R, 1I	54R, 40D	Mike Mansfield (D)	Lee Metcalf (D)	1D, 1R	Nixon/ Lodge (R) ✗
1963	Tim Babcock (R)	David F. James (R)	Frank Murray (D)	Forrest H. Anderson (D)	Edna Hinman (R)	E. V. "Sonny"; Omholt (R)	Harriet; Miller (R)	35D, 21R	57R, 37D	Mike Mansfield (D)	Lee Metcalf (D)	1D, 1R	Nixon/ Lodge (R) ✗
1964	Tim Babcock (R)	David F. James (R)	Frank Murray (D)	Forrest H. Anderson (D)	Edna Hinman (R)	E. V. "Sonny"; Omholt (R)	Harriet; Miller (R)	35D, 21R	57R, 37D	Mike Mansfield (D)	Lee Metcalf (D)	1D, 1R	Johnson/ Humphrey (D) ✓
1965	Tim Babcock (R)	Ted James (R)	Frank Murray (D)	Forrest H. Anderson (D)	Henry H. Anderson (D)	E. V. "Sonny"; Omholt (R)	Harriet Miller (D)	32D, 24R	56D, 38R	Mike Mansfield (D)	Lee Metcalf (D)	1D, 1R	Johnson/ Humphrey (D) ✓
1966	Tim Babcock (R)	Ted James (R)	Frank Murray (D)	Forrest H. Anderson (D)	Henry H. Anderson (D)	E. V. "Sonny"; Omholt (R)	Harriet Miller (D)	32D, 24R	56D, 38R	Mike Mansfield (D)	Lee Metcalf (D)	1D, 1R	Johnson/ Humphrey (D) ✓
1967	Tim Babcock (R)	Ted James (R)	Frank Murray (D)	Forrest H. Anderson (D)	Henry H. Anderson (D)	E. V. "Sonny"; Omholt (R)	Harriet Miller (D)	30D, 25R	64R, 40D	Mike Mansfield (D)	Lee Metcalf (D)	1D, 1R	Johnson/ Humphrey (D) ✓
1968	Tim Babcock (R)	Ted James (R)	Frank Murray (D)	Forrest H. Anderson (D)	Henry H. Anderson (D)	E. V. "Sonny"; Omholt (R)	Harriet Miller (D)	30D, 25R	64R, 40D	Mike Mansfield (D)	Lee Metcalf (D)	1D, 1R	Nixon/ Agnew (R) ✓
1969	Forrest H. Anderson (D)	Thomas Lee Judge (D)	Frank Murray (D)	Robert L. Woodahl (R)	Alex B. Stephenson (R)	E. V. "Sonny"; Omholt (R)	Dolores; Colburg (D)	30D, 25R	58R, 46D	Mike Mansfield (D)	Lee Metcalf (D)	2D	Nixon/ Agnew (R) ✓
1970	Forrest H. Anderson (D)	Thomas Lee Judge (D)	Frank Murray (D)	Robert L. Woodahl (R)	Alex B. Stephenson (R)	E. V. "Sonny"; Omholt (R)	Dolores; Colburg (D)	30D, 25R	58R, 46D	Mike Mansfield (D)	Lee Metcalf (D)	2D	Nixon/ Agnew (R) ✓
1971	Forrest H. Anderson (D)	Thomas Lee Judge (D)	Frank Murray (D)	Robert L. Woodahl (R)	Alex B. Stephenson (R)	E. V. "Sonny"; Omholt (R)	Dolores; Colburg (D)	30D, 25R	55R, 49D	Mike Mansfield (D)	Lee Metcalf (D)	1D, 1R	Nixon/ Agnew (R) ✓
1972	Forrest H. Anderson (D)	Thomas Lee Judge (D)	Frank Murray (D)	Robert L. Woodahl (R)	Alex B. Stephenson (R)	E. V. "Sonny"; Omholt (R)	Dolores; Colburg (D)	30D, 25R	55R, 49D	Mike Mansfield (D)	Lee Metcalf (D)	1D, 1R	Nixon/ Agnew (R) ✓
1973	Thomas Lee Judge (D)	Bill Christiansen (D)	Frank Murray (D)	Robert L. Woodahl (R)	Hollis Connors (R)	E. V. "Sonny"; Omholt (R)	Dolores; Colburg (D)	27D, 23R	54D, 46R	Mike Mansfield (D)	Lee Metcalf (D)	1D, 1R	Nixon/ Agnew (R) ✓
1974	Thomas Lee Judge (D)	Bill Christiansen (D)	Frank Murray (D)	Robert L. Woodahl (R)	Hollis Connors (R)	E. V. "Sonny"; Omholt (R)	Dolores; Colburg (D)	27D, 23R	54D, 46R	Mike Mansfield (D)	Lee Metcalf (D)	1D, 1R	Nixon/ Agnew (R) ✓
1975	Thomas Lee Judge (D)	Bill Christiansen (D)	Frank Murray (D)	Robert L. Woodahl (R)	Hollis Connors (R)	E. V. "Sonny"; Omholt (R)	Dolores; Colburg (D)	30D, 20R	67D, 33R	Mike Mansfield (D)	Lee Metcalf (D)	2D	Nixon/ Agnew (R) ✓
1976	Thomas Lee Judge (D)	Bill Christiansen (D)	Frank Murray (D)	Robert L. Woodahl (R)	Hollis Connors (R)	E. V. "Sonny"; Omholt (R)	Dolores; Colburg (D)	30D, 20R	67D, 33R	Mike Mansfield (D)	Lee Metcalf (D)	2D	Ford/ Dole (R) ✗

== 1977–present ==
Year	Executive offices						State Legislature		United States Congress			Electoral votes
Year	Governor	Lt. Governor	Secretary of State	Attorney General	Auditor	Supt. of Pub. Inst.	Senate	House	Senator (Class I)	Senator (Class II)	House	Electoral votes
1977	Thomas Lee; Judge (D)	Ted Schwinden (D)	Frank Murray (D)	Mike Greely (D)	E. V. "Sonny"; Omholt (R)	Georgia Ruth; Rice (D)	25D, 25R (Note: Party control granted to governor's party in the event of a tied house of the legislature.)	57D, 43R	John Melcher (D)	Paul G. Hatfield (D)	1D, 1R	
1978	Thomas Lee; Judge (D)	Ted Schwinden (D)	Frank Murray (D)	Mike Greely (D)	E. V. "Sonny"; Omholt (R)	Georgia Ruth; Rice (D)	25D, 25R	57D, 43R	John Melcher (D)	Paul G. Hatfield (D)	1D, 1R	
1979	Thomas Lee; Judge (D)	Ted Schwinden (D)	Frank Murray (D)	Mike Greely (D)	E. V. "Sonny"; Omholt (R)	Georgia Ruth; Rice (D)	26R, 24D	55D, 45R	John Melcher (D)	Max Baucus (D) (Note: Resigned February 6, 2014 in anticipation of being appointed United States Ambassador to China.)	1D, 1R	
1980	Thomas Lee; Judge (D)	Ted Schwinden (D)	Frank Murray (D)	Mike Greely (D)	E. V. "Sonny"; Omholt (R)	Georgia Ruth; Rice (D)	26R, 24D	55D, 45R	John Melcher (D)	Max Baucus (D)	1D, 1R	Reagan/ Bush (R) ✓
1981	Ted Schwinden (D)	George Turman (D)	Jim Waltermire (R)	Mike Greely (D)	E. V. "Sonny"; Omholt (R)	Ed Argenbright (R)	28R, 22D	57R, 43D	John Melcher (D)	Max Baucus (D)	1D, 1R	Reagan/ Bush (R) ✓
1982	Ted Schwinden (D)	George Turman (D)	Jim Waltermire (R)	Mike Greely (D)	E. V. "Sonny"; Omholt (R)	Ed Argenbright (R)	28R, 22D	57R, 43D	John Melcher (D)	Max Baucus (D)	1D, 1R	Reagan/ Bush (R) ✓
1983	Ted Schwinden (D)	George Turman (D)	Jim Waltermire (R)	Mike Greely (D)	E. V. "Sonny"; Omholt (R)	Ed Argenbright (R)	26R, 24D	55D, 45R	John Melcher (D)	Max Baucus (D)	1D, 1R	Reagan/ Bush (R) ✓
1984	Ted Schwinden (D)	George Turman (D)	Jim Waltermire (R)	Mike Greely (D)	E. V. "Sonny"; Omholt (R)	Ed Argenbright (R)	26R, 24D	55D, 45R	John Melcher (D)	Max Baucus (D)	1D, 1R	Reagan/ Bush (R) ✓
1985	Ted Schwinden (D)	George Turman (D)	Jim Waltermire (R)	Mike Greely (D)	Andrea Bennett (R)	Ed Argenbright (R)	28D, 22R	50D, 50R (Note: By statute, in the event of a tie chamber, the party of the Governor receives the Speakership. However, the committees and administration of the chamber and its committees were organized on a 50-50 basis, with an equal number of chairmen and members of both parties.)	John Melcher (D)	Max Baucus (D)	1D, 1R	Reagan/ Bush (R) ✓
1986	Ted Schwinden (D)	George Turman (D)	Jim Waltermire (R)	Mike Greely (D)	Andrea Bennett (R)	Ed Argenbright (R)	28D, 22R	50D, 50R	John Melcher (D)	Max Baucus (D)	1D, 1R	Reagan/ Bush (R) ✓
1987	Ted Schwinden (D)	George Turman (D)	Jim Waltermire (R)	Mike Greely (D)	Andrea Bennett (R)	Ed Argenbright (R)	25D, 25R (Note: By statute, in the event of a tie chamber, the party of the Governor receives the Presidency. However, the committees and administration of the chamber and its committees were organized on a 50-50 basis, with an equal number of chairmen and members of both parties.)	51R, 49D	John Melcher (D)	Max Baucus (D)	1D, 1R	Reagan/ Bush (R) ✓
1988	Ted Schwinden (D)	Gordon McOmber (D)	Verner Bertelsen (R)	Mike Greely (D)	Andrea Bennett (R)	Ed Argenbright (R)	25D, 25R	51R, 49D	John Melcher (D)	Max Baucus (D)	1D, 1R	Bush/ Quayle (R) ✓
1989	Stan Stephens (R)	Allen Kolstad (R) (Note: Resigned to take a presidential appointment to the International Boundary Commission.)	Mike Cooney (D)	Marc Racicot (R)	Andrea Bennett (R)	Nancy Keenan (D)	27R, 23D	52D, 48R	Conrad Burns (R)	Max Baucus (D)	1D, 1R	Bush/ Quayle (R) ✓
1990	Stan Stephens (R)	Allen Kolstad (R)	Mike Cooney (D)	Marc Racicot (R)	Andrea Bennett (R)	Nancy Keenan (D)	27R, 23D	52D, 48R	Conrad Burns (R)	Max Baucus (D)	1D, 1R	Bush/ Quayle (R) ✓
1991	Stan Stephens (R)	Denny Rehberg (R)	Mike Cooney (D)	Marc Racicot (R)	Andrea Bennett (R)	Nancy Keenan (D)	29D, 21R	61D, 39R	Conrad Burns (R)	Max Baucus (D)	1D, 1R	Bush/ Quayle (R) ✓
1992	Stan Stephens (R)	Denny Rehberg (R)	Mike Cooney (D)	Marc Racicot (R)	Andrea Bennett (R)	Nancy Keenan (D)	29D, 21R	61D, 39R	Conrad Burns (R)	Max Baucus (D)	1D, 1R	Clinton/ Gore (D) ✓
1993	Marc Racicot (R)	Denny Rehberg (R)	Mike Cooney (D)	Joseph P. Mazurek (D)	Mark O'Keefe (D)	Nancy Keenan (D)	30D, 20R	53R, 47D	Conrad Burns (R)	Max Baucus (D)	Pat Williams (D)	Clinton/ Gore (D) ✓
1994	Marc Racicot (R)	Denny Rehberg (R)	Mike Cooney (D)	Joseph P. Mazurek (D)	Mark O'Keefe (D)	Nancy Keenan (D)	30D, 20R	53R, 47D	Conrad Burns (R)	Max Baucus (D)	Pat Williams (D)	Clinton/ Gore (D) ✓
1995	Marc Racicot (R)	Denny Rehberg (R)	Mike Cooney (D)	Joseph P. Mazurek (D)	Mark O'Keefe (D)	Nancy Keenan (D)	31R, 19D	67R, 33D	Conrad Burns (R)	Max Baucus (D)	Pat Williams (D)	Clinton/ Gore (D) ✓
1996	Marc Racicot (R)	Denny Rehberg (R)	Mike Cooney (D)	Joseph P. Mazurek (D)	Mark O'Keefe (D)	Nancy Keenan (D)	31R, 19D	67R, 33D	Conrad Burns (R)	Max Baucus (D)	Pat Williams (D)	Dole/ Kemp (R) ✗
1997	Marc Racicot (R)	Judy Martz (R)	Mike Cooney (D)	Joseph P. Mazurek (D)	Mark O'Keefe (D)	Nancy Keenan (D)	34R, 16D	65R, 35D	Conrad Burns (R)	Max Baucus (D)	Rick Hill (R)	Dole/ Kemp (R) ✗
1998	Marc Racicot (R)	Judy Martz (R)	Mike Cooney (D)	Joseph P. Mazurek (D)	Mark O'Keefe (D)	Nancy Keenan (D)	34R, 16D	65R, 35D	Conrad Burns (R)	Max Baucus (D)	Rick Hill (R)	Dole/ Kemp (R) ✗
1999	Marc Racicot (R)	Judy Martz (R)	Mike Cooney (D)	Joseph P. Mazurek (D)	Mark O'Keefe (D)	Nancy Keenan (D)	32R, 18D	59R, 41D	Conrad Burns (R)	Max Baucus (D)	Rick Hill (R)	Dole/ Kemp (R) ✗
2000	Marc Racicot (R)	Judy Martz (R)	Mike Cooney (D)	Joseph P. Mazurek (D)	Mark O'Keefe (D)	Nancy Keenan (D)	32R, 18D	59R, 41D	Conrad Burns (R)	Max Baucus (D)	Rick Hill (R)	Bush/ Cheney (R) ✓
2001	Judy Martz (R)	Karl Ohs (R)	Bob Brown (R)	Mike McGrath (D)	John Morrison (D)	Linda McCulloch (D)	31R, 19D	58R, 42D	Conrad Burns (R)	Max Baucus (D)	Denny Rehberg (R)	Bush/ Cheney (R) ✓
2002	Judy Martz (R)	Karl Ohs (R)	Bob Brown (R)	Mike McGrath (D)	John Morrison (D)	Linda McCulloch (D)	31R, 19D	58R, 42D	Conrad Burns (R)	Max Baucus (D)	Denny Rehberg (R)	Bush/ Cheney (R) ✓
2003	Judy Martz (R)	Karl Ohs (R)	Bob Brown (R)	Mike McGrath (D)	John Morrison (D)	Linda McCulloch (D)	29R, 21D	53R, 47D	Conrad Burns (R)	Max Baucus (D)	Denny Rehberg (R)	Bush/ Cheney (R) ✓
2004	Judy Martz (R)	Karl Ohs (R)	Bob Brown (R)	Mike McGrath (D)	John Morrison (D)	Linda McCulloch (D)	29R, 21D	53R, 47D	Conrad Burns (R)	Max Baucus (D)	Denny Rehberg (R)	Bush/ Cheney (R) ✓
2005	Brian Schweitzer (D) (Note: Elected on bipartisan ticket.)	John Bohlinger (R)	Brad Johnson (R)	Mike McGrath (D)	John Morrison (D)	Linda McCulloch (D)	27D, 23R	50D, 50R	Conrad Burns (R)	Max Baucus (D)	Denny Rehberg (R)	Bush/ Cheney (R) ✓
2006	Brian Schweitzer (D)	John Bohlinger (R)	Brad Johnson (R)	Mike McGrath (D)	John Morrison (D)	Linda McCulloch (D)	27D, 23R	50D, 50R	Conrad Burns (R)	Max Baucus (D)	Denny Rehberg (R)	Bush/ Cheney (R) ✓
2007	Brian Schweitzer (D)	John Bohlinger (R)	Brad Johnson (R)	Mike McGrath (D)	John Morrison (D)	Linda McCulloch (D)	26D, 24R (Note: Republican Sam Kitzenberg switched parties shortly after the 2006 election.)	50R, 49D, 1C (Note: Constitution Party member caucused with Republicans.)	Jon Tester (D)	Max Baucus (D)	Denny Rehberg (R)	Bush/ Cheney (R) ✓
2008	Brian Schweitzer (D)	John Bohlinger (R)	Brad Johnson (R)	Mike McGrath (D)	John Morrison (D)	Linda McCulloch (D)	26D, 24R	50R, 49D, 1C	Jon Tester (D)	Max Baucus (D)	Denny Rehberg (R)	McCain/ Palin (R) ✗
2009	Brian Schweitzer (D)	John Bohlinger (R)	Linda McCulloch (D)	Steve Bullock (D)	Monica Lindeen (D)	Denise Juneau (D)	27R, 23D	50D, 50R	Jon Tester (D)	Max Baucus (D)	Denny Rehberg (R)	McCain/ Palin (R) ✗
2010	Brian Schweitzer (D)	John Bohlinger (R)	Linda McCulloch (D)	Steve Bullock (D)	Monica Lindeen (D)	Denise Juneau (D)	27R, 23D	50D, 50R	Jon Tester (D)	Max Baucus (D)	Denny Rehberg (R)	McCain/ Palin (R) ✗
2011	Brian Schweitzer (D)	John Bohlinger (R)	Linda McCulloch (D)	Steve Bullock (D)	Monica Lindeen (D)	Denise Juneau (D)	28R, 22D	68R, 32D	Jon Tester (D)	Max Baucus (D)	Denny Rehberg (R)	McCain/ Palin (R) ✗
2012	Brian Schweitzer (D)	John Bohlinger (R)	Linda McCulloch (D)	Steve Bullock (D)	Monica Lindeen (D)	Denise Juneau (D)	28R, 22D	68R, 32D	Jon Tester (D)	Max Baucus (D)	Denny Rehberg (R)	Romney/ Ryan (R) ✗
2013	Steve Bullock (D)	John Walsh (D)	Linda McCulloch (D)	Tim Fox (R)	Monica Lindeen (D)	Denise Juneau (D)	29R, 21D	61R, 39D	Jon Tester (D)	Max Baucus (D)	Steve Daines (R)	Romney/ Ryan (R) ✗
2014	Steve Bullock (D)	Angela McLean (D)	Linda McCulloch (D)	Tim Fox (R)	Monica Lindeen (D)	Denise Juneau (D)	29R, 21D	61R, 39D	Jon Tester (D)	John Walsh (D)	Steve Daines (R)	Romney/ Ryan (R) ✗
2015	Steve Bullock (D)	Angela McLean (D)	Linda McCulloch (D)	Tim Fox (R)	Monica Lindeen (D)	Denise Juneau (D)	29R, 21D	59R, 41D	Jon Tester (D)	Steve Daines (R)	Ryan Zinke (R) (Note: Resigned March 2017 to become the United States Secretary of the Interior.)	Romney/ Ryan (R) ✗
2016	Steve Bullock (D)	Mike Cooney (D)	Linda McCulloch (D)	Tim Fox (R)	Monica Lindeen (D)	Denise Juneau (D)	29R, 21D	59R, 41D	Jon Tester (D)	Steve Daines (R)	Ryan Zinke (R)	Trump/ Pence (R) ✓
2017	Steve Bullock (D)	Mike Cooney (D)	Corey Stapleton (R)	Tim Fox (R)	Matt Rosendale (R)	Elsie Arntzen (R)	32R, 18D	59R, 41D	Jon Tester (D)	Steve Daines (R)	Greg Gianforte (R)	Trump/ Pence (R) ✓
2018	Steve Bullock (D)	Mike Cooney (D)	Corey Stapleton (R)	Tim Fox (R)	Matt Rosendale (R)	Elsie Arntzen (R)	32R, 18D	59R, 41D	Jon Tester (D)	Steve Daines (R)	Greg Gianforte (R)	Trump/ Pence (R) ✓
2019	Steve Bullock (D)	Mike Cooney (D)	Corey Stapleton (R)	Tim Fox (R)	Matt Rosendale (R)	Elsie Arntzen (R)	30R, 20D	58R, 42D	Jon Tester (D)	Steve Daines (R)	Greg Gianforte (R)	Trump/ Pence (R) ✓
2020	Steve Bullock (D)	Mike Cooney (D)	Corey Stapleton (R)	Tim Fox (R)	Matt Rosendale (R)	Elsie Arntzen (R)	30R, 20D	58R, 42D	Jon Tester (D)	Steve Daines (R)	Greg Gianforte (R)	Trump/ Pence (R) ✗
2021	Greg Gianforte (R)	Kristen Juras (R)	Christi Jacobsen (R)	Austin Knudsen (R)	Troy Downing (R)	Elsie Arntzen (R)	31R, 19D	67R, 33D	Jon Tester (D)	Steve Daines (R)	Matt Rosendale (R)	Trump/ Pence (R) ✗
2022	Greg Gianforte (R)	Kristen Juras (R)	Christi Jacobsen (R)	Austin Knudsen (R)	Troy Downing (R)	Elsie Arntzen (R)	31R, 19D	67R, 33D	Jon Tester (D)	Steve Daines (R)	Matt Rosendale (R)	Trump/ Pence (R) ✗
2023	Greg Gianforte (R)	Kristen Juras (R)	Christi Jacobsen (R)	Austin Knudsen (R)	Troy Downing (R)	Elsie Arntzen (R)	34R, 16D	68R, 32D	Jon Tester (D)	Steve Daines (R)	2R	Trump/ Pence (R) ✗
2024	Greg Gianforte (R)	Kristen Juras (R)	Christi Jacobsen (R)	Austin Knudsen (R)	Troy Downing (R)	Elsie Arntzen (R)	34R, 16D	68R, 32D	Jon Tester (D)	Steve Daines (R)	2R	Trump/ Vance (R) ✓
2025	Greg Gianforte (R)	Kristen Juras (R)	Christi Jacobsen (R)	Austin Knudsen (R)	James Brown (R)	Susie Hedalen (R)	32R, 18D	58R, 42D	Tim Sheehy (R)	Steve Daines (R)	2R	Trump/ Vance (R) ✓
2026	Greg Gianforte (R)	Kristen Juras (R)	Christi Jacobsen (R)	Austin Knudsen (R)	James Brown (R)	Susie Hedalen (R)	32R, 18D	58R, 42D	Tim Sheehy (R)	Steve Daines (R)	2R	Trump/ Vance (R) ✓
2027	Greg Gianforte (R)	Kristen Juras (R)	Christi Jacobsen (R)	Austin Knudsen (R)	James Brown (R)	Susie Hedalen (R)	30R, 20D	56R, 44D	Tim Sheehy (R)	Kurt Alme (R)	1D, 1R	Trump/ Vance (R) ✓

== See also ==
- Politics in Montana
