= Alex B. Stephenson =

American politician and law enforcement officer

Montana State Treasurer
- In office January 6, 1969 – January 1, 1973
- Governor: Forrest H. Anderson
- Preceded by: Henry H. Anderson
- Succeeded by: Hollis Connors

Personal details
- Born: February 7, 1908; Ceylon, Minnesota
- Died: September 8, 1996 (aged 88); Helena, Montana
- Political party: Republican
- Spouse: Jean Smith

Alexander B. Stephenson was a Republican politician and law enforcement officer who served as Montana State Treasurer from 1969 to 1973.

== History ==
Stephenson was born in Ceylon, Minnesota, and grew up in Lewistown, Montana, where he attended Fergus County High School. He joined the Montana Highway Patrol in 1937 and was one of the first officers in the Patrol. He served in the United States Air Force during World War II and worked in military intelligence. After returning from military service, Stephenson was promoted to sergeant in the Highway Patrol and became Director of Safety and Education in 1954. Following the resignation of Glenn Schultz as Supervisor of the Highway Patrol in 1956, Stephenson was appointed as his successor. He served as Supervisor until he resigned in 1968 to campaign for Treasurer.

== State Treasurer ==
In 1968, Stephenson announced that he would run for State Treasurer. Transitioning from the Highway Patrol to the Treasurer's office was not uncommon. In the preceding decades, Charles L. Sheridan and Tip O'Neal, both former Highway Patrol Supervisors, had run for State Treasurer, and Sheridan had been elected. He argued that his experience as Supervisor qualified him for Treasurer, noting that the position was one of "trust and compliance with the laws of the state." Stephenson faced Yellowstone County Treasurer Opal Eggert in the Republican primary. Polling showed Stephenson winning the primary by a wide margin, and he ended up defeating Eggert by a wide margin, winning Connors defeated Eggert by a wide margin, however, winning 65% of the vote to Eggert's 35%.

In the general election, Stephenson was opposed by former Lieutenant Governor Paul C. Cannon, the Democratic nominee. At the beginning of the campaign, Stephenson staked out a significant lead against Cannon, with an August 1968 poll showing him up over Cannon, 63-32%, and every other statewide Republican candidate leading. By October, however, the race had tightened considerably; the same poll showed other statewide Democrats leading their races and Stephenson's lead had been cut down to just 51-44%. Both candidates were widely known, with the Kalispell Daily Inter Lake criticizing Cannon as "too familiar" in the political arena given his long history of quixotic campaigns. Ultimately, Stephenson defeated Cannon by a slim margin, receiving 53% of the vote to Cannon's 47%, as Republican Richard Nixon won the state by a wide margin in the presidential election and as Democrat Forrest H. Anderson won the gubernatorial election by a wider margin.

== Public Service Commission campaign ==
Stephenson was unable to seek re-election in 1972 because of the constitutional one-term limit on state treasurers, and opted to challenge incumbent Public Service Commissioner Lou Boedecker for re-election. He campaigned on his support for protecting "consumers from unnecessary charges." Despite Stephenson's position, however, he was outmaneuvered by Boedecker during the campaign; when the Public Service Commission's Republican members voted for a rate increase, Boedecker was the only dissenting vote. Boedecker's vote earned him the endorsement of The Missoulian, which noted that he "has the votes to back up" his claim that he was a consumer advocate, while Stephenson "doesn't say how" he would protect consumers. In the end, Stephenson lost to Boedecker by a wide margin, winning just 45% of the vote to Boedecker's 55%, as Republicans throughout the state did poorly.

Preceded by Henry H. Anderson	Montana State Treasurer; 1969–1973	Succeeded by Hollis Connors
