= 1968 Montana gubernatorial election =

- November 5, 1968
- Turnout: 86.40%▲0.60
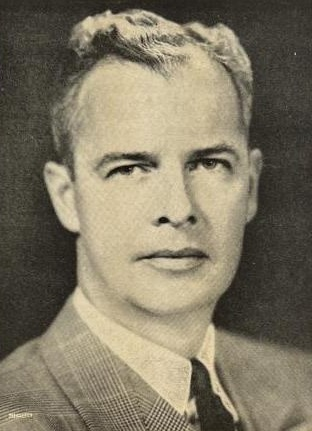

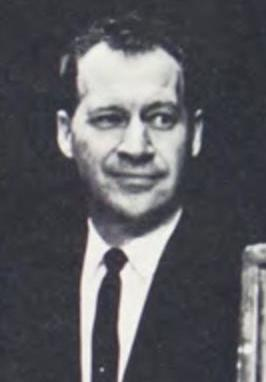
Nominee	Forrest H. Anderson	Tim Babcock
Party	Democratic	Republican
Popular vote	150,481	116,432
Percentage	54.11%	41.87%
- County results Anderson: 40–50% 50–60% 60–70% 70–80% Babcock: 40–50% 50–60%
Governor before election
Tim Babcock
Republican
Elected Governor
Forrest H. Anderson
Democratic

The 1968 Montana gubernatorial election took place on November 5, 1968. Incumbent governor of Montana Tim Babcock, who became governor upon the death of previous governor Donald Grant Nutter and was elected in 1964, ran for re-election. He faced serious competition in the Republican primary from his lieutenant governor, but managed to comfortably win renomination. Advancing to the general election, Babcock faced Forrest H. Anderson, the attorney general of Montana and the Democratic nominee, and independent candidate Wayne Montgomery of the New Reform Party. Ultimately, Anderson managed to defeat Babcock by a solid margin, winning his first and only term as governor. As of 2023, this is the last time an incumbent governor of Montana lost re-election.

== Democratic primary ==
=== Candidates ===
- Forrest H. Anderson, Attorney General of Montana
- Eugene H. Mahoney, State Senator
- LeRoy H. Anderson, State Senator, former United States Congressman from Montana's 2nd congressional district
- Willard E. Fraser, Mayor of Billings
- Hanford K. Gallup, rancher
- Merrill K. Riddick

=== Results ===
Democratic Party primary results
Party	Candidate	Votes	%
Democratic	Forrest H. Anderson	39,057	38.36
Democratic	Eugene H. Mahoney	35,562	34.93
Democratic	LeRoy H. Anderson	16,476	16.18
Democratic	Willard E. Fraser	8,525	8.37
Democratic	Hanford K. Gallup	1,149	1.13
Democratic	Merrill K. Riddick	1,052	1.03
Total votes		101,821	100.00

== Republican primary ==
=== Candidates ===
- Tim Babcock, incumbent Governor of Montana
- Ted James, Lieutenant Governor of Montana
- Warren A. McMillan
- J. Wellington Fauver

=== Results ===
Republican Primary results
Party	Candidate	Votes	%
Republican	Tim Babcock (incumbent)	50,369	55.10
Republican	Ted James	36,664	40.11
Republican	Warren A. McMillan	2,994	3.28
Republican	J. Wellington Fauver	1,392	1.52
Total votes		91,419	100.00

== General election ==
=== Results ===
Montana gubernatorial election, 1968
Party	Candidate	Votes	%	±%
Democratic	Forrest H. Anderson	150,481	54.11%	+5.40%
Republican	Tim Babcock (incumbent)	116,432	41.87%	−9.43%
New Reform Party	Wayne Montgomery	11,199	4.03%	
Majority		34,049	12.24%	+9.66%
Turnout		278,112		
Democratic gain from Republican		Swing		
