= Roland Renne =

American university president and politician

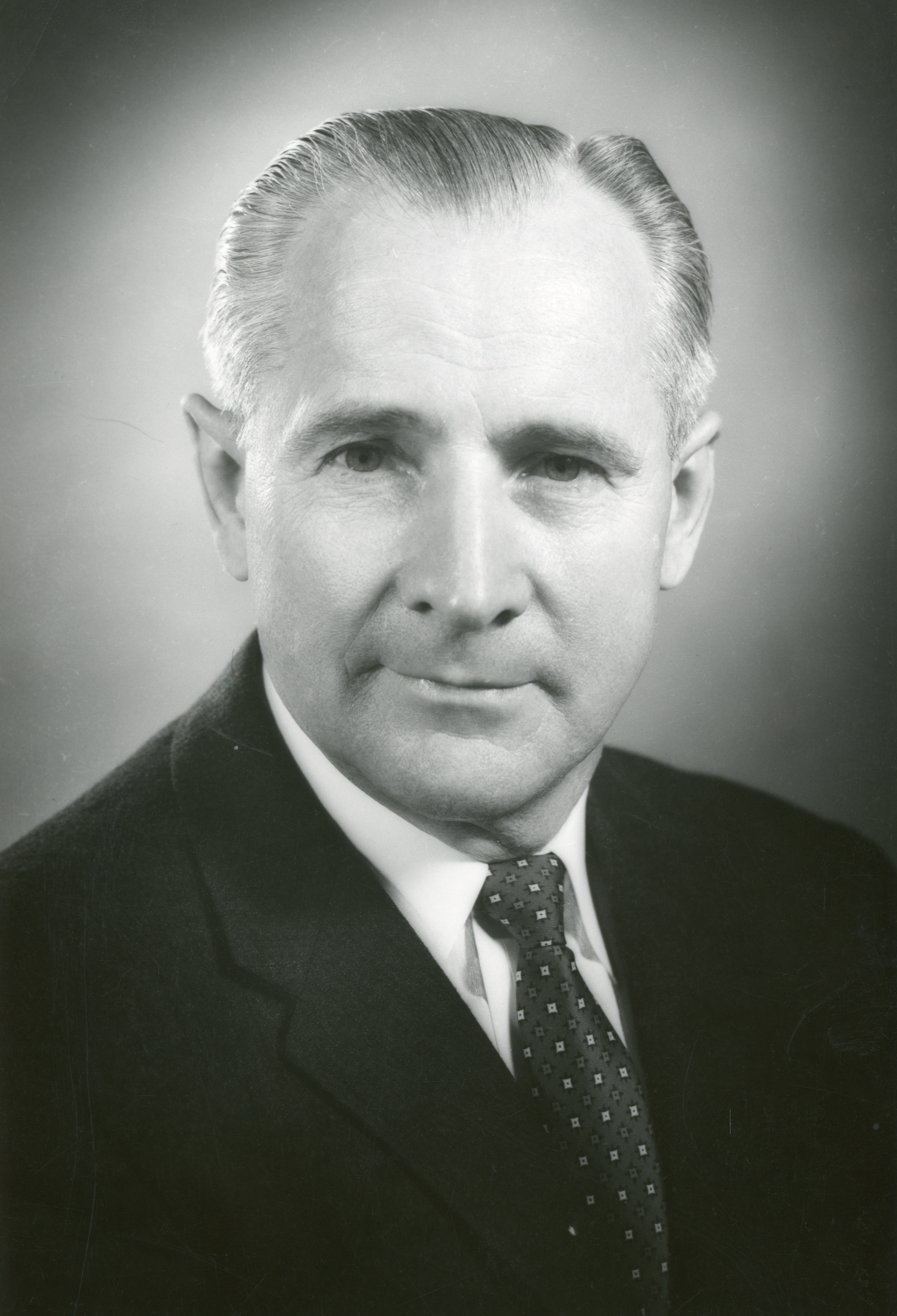
- Renne in 1960

6th President of Montana State University
- In office 1943 (acting from 1943 to June 30, 1944) – February 1964
- Preceded by: A. L. Strand
- Succeeded by: Leon H. Johnson

Personal details
- Born: December 12, 1905 Greenwich, New Jersey, U.S.
- Died: August 30, 1989 (aged 83) Bozeman, Montana, U.S.
- Spouse: Mary Polly Kneeland Wisner
- Children: 4
- Education: Rutgers University; University of Wisconsin
- Profession: Professor of Economics
- Website: www.montana.edu

Roland R. Renne (December 12, 1905 – August 30, 1989) was an American agricultural economics professor who served as President of Montana State College from 1943 to 1964. Renne was also active in Washington, D.C., and United States overseas agricultural economics work. He was the 1964 Democratic candidate for governor of Montana.

== Biography ==
Roland Renne, born on December 12, 1905, was the third of five children born to Fred Christian Renne and Caroline Augusta (Young) Renne. Roland grew up on the family's truck and dairy farm in the remote Pine Barrens of southern New Jersey. As a boy, he helped his father on the farm and attended country schools. He attended Rutgers University and graduated summa cum laude in 1927. He continued his education and obtained his Ph.D. in Agricultural Economics from University of Wisconsin in 1930.

Rutgers University and University of Wisconsin are both land-grant schools and each influenced the development of Roland Renne's educational philosophy and championing of public education. Two economists heavily influenced Renne; the economist Richard T. Ely and John R. Commons. Following his graduation in 1930, Renne arrived in Bozeman, Montana to start his teaching at Montana State College as Assistant Professor of Agriculture Economics. On August 19, 1932 he married Mary Polly Kneeland Wisner with whom he had four children.

Renne died in Bozeman, Montana on August 30, 1989.

== Career ==
Renne went to Montana State College in Bozeman, Montana in 1930 to work as Assistant Professor of Agricultural Economics. Renne was an Agricultural Economics Professor and Agriculture Department Head from 1930 to 1943 and President of Montana State College from 1943 to 1964.

During the U.S. Depression years and World War II years, Renne devoted much of his time to educational outreach with small farmers and agricultural labor in support of both the WPA and World War II war efforts. As the Agricultural Economics Department head and chairman of the Bozeman city school board, Renne worked closely with the WPA to obtain New Deal educational funds for the construction of three new Bozeman, Montana elementary schools: Hawthorne, Irving and Longfellow.

In 1942, Renne accepted a position in Montana's Office of Price Administration and Civilian Supply (OPA), but in the following year, 1943, Renne left OPA and was appointed Acting President of MSC. In 1944 Renne was appointed President of Montana State College.

At the close of WWII, Renne recognized the G.I.Bill (Servicemen's readjustment Act) of 1944 passed by Congress was quickly increasing the demand for classrooms, additional faculty and increased student housing by new student G.I.s and their families. Because of the G.I. Bill, MSC's student body almost doubled from 1,155 in 1945 to 2,014 in 1946, and doubled again in 1947 to 3,591. With qualifying veterans returning to college at the end of the WW II, Renne provided active leadership to make the necessary changes on campus to accommodate those men and women who used the G.I. Bill to get a higher education degree at MSC. With a huge growth in students came an increase in faculty with the faculty almost doubling from 132 in 1945 to 257 in 1950.

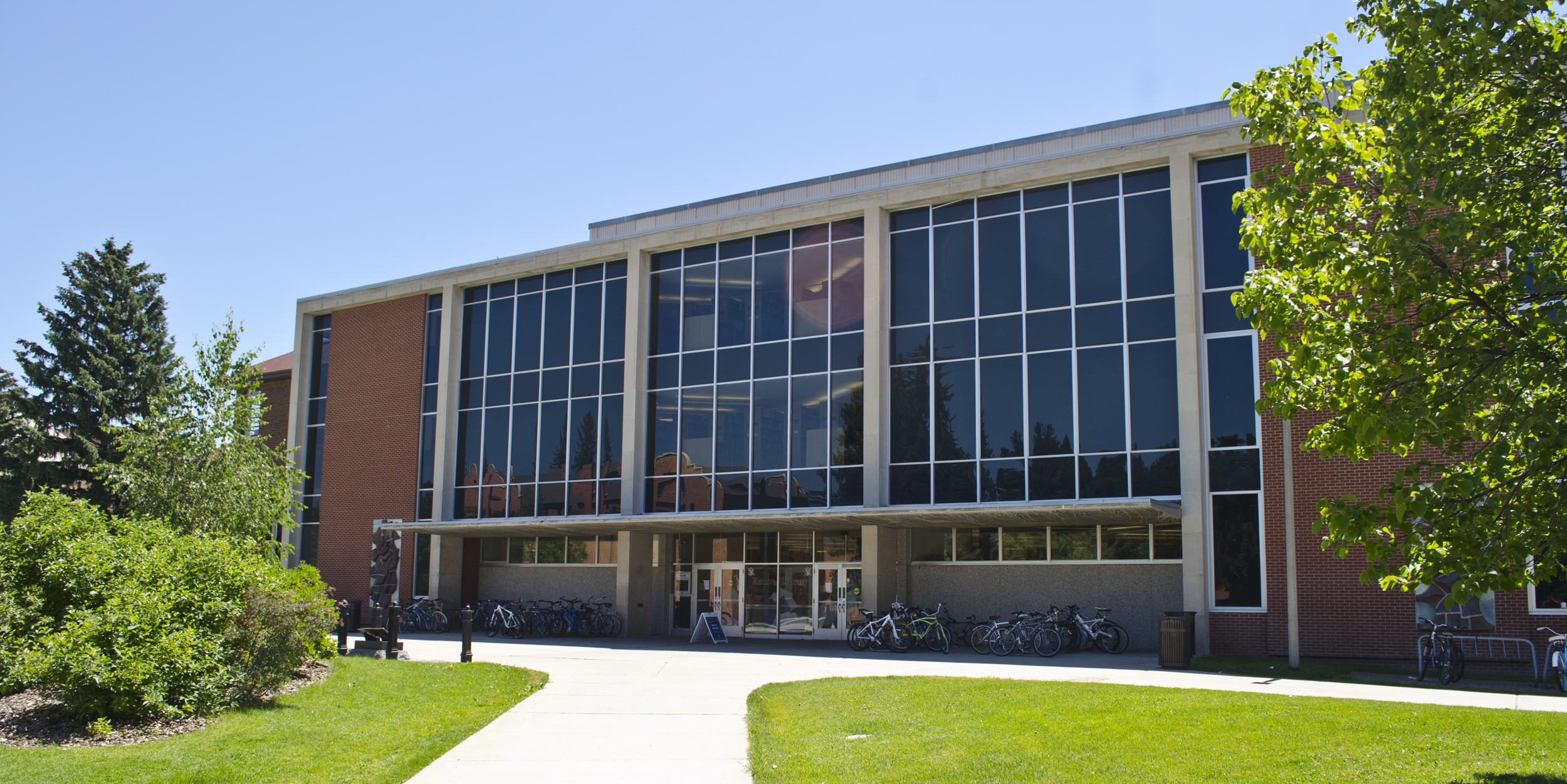
Renne Library on the MSU Campus

To meet the immediate needs of G.I. student and faculty housing and expanded classrooms, Renne installed recycled wooden buildings from a chrome mining project in Columbus, Montana to serve as classrooms for physics, chemistry lab, nursing, education, engineering, agriculture wool lab, psychology and music. To accommodate student and new faculty housing, Renne found prefab war-surplus wooden frame building, quonset huts, barracks, and over 100 small trailers. Then he went to the state capitol, Helena, Montana, and worked with the legislature to use some of the $4.5 million war surplus monies to fund a new brick library, update older buildings, and upgrade the physical plant. Renne also recognized that immediately following the end of WWII, only 16.9% of all instructional budget was spent on humanities and social sciences and called for substantial budgetary increases for liberal arts, citing a need for "a more realistic appreciation of the values of humanistic-social science subjects ... in the interests of serving the general welfare."

In recognition of Renne's service to Montana State College, the Montana State University named Renne Library in his memory. Materials relating to Renne's unsuccessful 1964 gubernatorial campaign are held at Montana State University Archives and Special Collections. Renne was named as one of Montana State's most important presidents in 2011, in an interview with three MSU historians--Jeffrey Safford, Pierce Mullen, and Robert Rydell—in the Bozeman Daily Chronicle.

=== United States government service ===
From 1950 to 1951 Renne was the president of the Water Resources Policy Commission and in 1951 to 1953 he acted as chief of the Mutual Security Agency's Special Technological and Economic Mission to the Philippines. In 1958, he accepted the role of Chief of the Agricultural Survey Mission to Peru for the Joint International Bank for Reconstruction of the Food and Agriculture Organization of the United Nations. In 1960, Renne became a consultant regarding land development for the U.S. Operations Mission to Ethiopia, and in 1961 he became a member of the National Advisory Council for Health Research Facilities, HEW.

Renne was the Assistant Secretary of Agriculture for International Affairs in Washington, D.C., and through an appointment issued by then U.S. President John F. Kennedy, he also served as Assistant Secretary of Agriculture for International Affairs from 1963 to 1964. Renne also became one of the original board of trustees of the Philippine Rural Reconstruction Movement.

By 1964 up to 1969, he was Director of Office of Interior Water Resources Research, U.S. Department of the Interior, Washington D.C. After leaving the Water Resources Research Office in 1969, he was chief of the Agricultural University Development in Illinois/USAID Team for India until 1972. In 1974, Renne was Director of the Foreign Trade Study at Montana State University.

=== Political career ===
In February 1964, Renne resigned as president of Montana State College to run for Governor of Montana in 1964. He defeated Mike Kuchera in the Democratic primary, and advanced to the general election, where he ran against incumbent Governor Tim M. Babcock. Babcock was running for re-election following his ascension to the Governorship in 1962 when the previous Governor, Donald Grant Nutter, died in a plane crash.

In the election, Renne placed emphasis on economic development in response to the 1964 sluggish economy, a need of greater support for education, relief for property taxes, and tax programs based upon ability to pay tax to fund his educational programs. Democrats also asserted that a Republican administration would adopt a sales tax and the institution of right-to-work law.

Republicans and Babcock denied any plans for a sales-tax or right-to-work law and placed their emphasis on Governor Babcock's business-like administration of reduced deficit and balanced budget without new taxes, current support for education and custodial institutions, and that agriculture was the only area of Montana's economy not prospering.

The election results had Renne receiving 136,682 votes, and Babcock receiving 144,113 votes.

=== Memberships ===
Renne was a member of Rotary, American Economic Association, American Academy of Political and Social Science, Phi Beta Kappa, Phi Kappa Phi and Alpha Zeta.

=== Publications ===
- Roland Roger Renne (1928). The relation of the Federal Reserve Banking System to the agricultural depression beginning in 1920. Madison, University of Wisconsin
- Roland Roger Renne (1932). The economics of bean production and marketing in Montana. Bozeman, MSU Agricultural Experiment Station
- Roland Roger Renne (1933). The tariff on dairy products. Madison, WI Tariff Research Committee
- Roland Roger Renne (1933).The flaxseed market and the tariff. Bozeman, MSU Agricultural Experiment Station
- Roland Roger Renne, Bushrod W Allin (1934). Montana farm taxes. Bozeman, MSU Agricultural Experiment Station
- Roland Roger Renne (1935).Montana county organization, services, and costs: a study in county government with suggestions for its improvement. Bozeman, MSU Agricultural experiment station
- Roland Roger Renne (1935). Financing Montana schools: a summary of an analysis of the system of financing elementary and secondary education with suggested changes
- Roland Roger Renne (1935). Readjusting Montana's agriculture - I The need and basis for readjustment. Bozeman, MSU Agricultural Experiment Station
- Roland Roger Renne (1935). Significance of the ownership pattern to land use planning. Bozeman, MT MSU Agricultural Economics & Economics Dept.
- Roland Roger Renne (1936). Organization and costs of Montana schools: an analysis of the system of financing elementary and secondary education with suggested changes. Bozeman, MSC Agricultural Experiment Station
- Roland Roger Renne (1936). Montana land ownership: an analysis of the ownership pattern and its significance in land use planning. Bozeman, MSC Agricultural Experiment Station
- Roland Roger Renne (1936). Readjusting Montana's agriculture - III Population resources and prospects. Bozeman, MSU Agricultural Experiment Station
- Roland Roger Renne (1936). Readjusting Montana's agriculture - IV Land ownership and tenure. Bozeman, MSU Agricultural Experiment Station
- Roland Roger Renne (1936). Readjusting Montana's agriculture - VIII Tax delinquency and mortgage foreclosures. Bozeman, MSU Agricultural Experiment Station
- Roland Roger Renne (1936). Montana land ownership an analysis of the ownership pattern and its significance in land use planning. Bozeman, MSU Agricultural Experiment Station
- Roland Roger Renne (1936). Organization and Costs of Montana Schools - an Analysis of the System of Financing Elementary and Secondary Education With Suggested Changes. Bozeman, MSU Agricultural Economics & Economics Dept.
- Roland Roger Renne (1937). Assessment of Montana farm lands a study of the inequalities resulting from present methods of assessing dry farm and range lands and some suggestions for improvement. Bozeman, MSU Agricultural Experiment Station
- Roland Roger Renne (1938). Montana farm bankruptcies: a study of the number, characteristics, and causes of farm bankruptcies over a forty-year period with some suggestions for preventing them in the future. Bozeman, MSU Agricultural Experiment Station
- Roland Roger Renne (1938). Montana farm taxes: the significance of farm taxes to Montana agriculture. Bozeman, Montana Extension Service in Agriculture and Home Economics, Montana State College and U.S. Dept. of Agriculture
- Roland Roger Renne, Howard H. Lord (1938). Montana farm price variations: the economic significance of fluctuating farm prices to Montana agricultural stability. Bozeman, Montana Extension Service in Agriculture and Home Economics
- Roland Roger Renne (1939). Montana farm foreclosures: number, characteristics, and causes of farm mortgage foreclosures over a seventy-year period, with some suggestions for reducing them in the future. Bozeman, MSU Agricultural Experiment Station
- Roland Roger Renne (1939). Butte, Montana: a preliminary report of an economic survey showing population characteristics and trends, industrial development, employment, labor conditions, incomes, living costs and standards, costs of government, and related information for the Butte community . Butte, MT McKee Print. Co.
- Roland Roger Renne (1940). Montana farm real estate mortgage indebtedness: amount, distribution, characteristics and trend of Montana farm mortgage debt. Bozeman, MSU Agricultural Experiment Station
- Roland Roger Renne (1940). Montana income tax studies. Bozeman, MSU Agricultural Economics & Economics Dept.
- Roland Roger Renne, O H Brownlee (1940). Uncollected property taxes in Montana: an analysis of the amount, growth, causes, and means of reducing Montana property tax delinquency with special emphasis on rural property. Bozeman, MSC Agricultural Experiment Station
- Roland Roger Renne (1942). Montana population changes and prospects: an analysis of Montana population trends, recent changes accompanying movement into the Armed Forces and war industries, and prospective further changes. Bozeman, MSU Agricultural Experiment Station
- Roland Roger Renne (1947). Land economics; principles, problems, and policies in utilizing land resources. New York, Harper
- Roland Roger Renne (1947). Montana nonresident motor vehicle travel survey: Summer, 1975. Bozeman, MSU Agricultural Economics Dept.
- Roland R. Renne (1950). The President's Water Resources Policy Commission
- Roland Roger Renne (1952). P.I. entering period of expansion. Manila
- Roland R Renne (1952). A master plan of P.I. industrialization. Manila
- Jonathan Forman, Roland Roger Renne, G B MacDonald (1953). Report on the problem of mining claims on the national forests. Washington, U.S. Dept. of Agriculture, Forest Service
- Roland Roger Renne (1958). The government and administration of Montana. New York, Crowell
- Roland Roger Renne (1958). Cost of county government in Montana. Bozeman, MSU Agricultural Experiment Station
- Roland Roger Renne (1958). Land economics: Principles, problems, and policies in utilizing land resources. New York, Harper & Brothers Publ.
- Charles M Hardin (1960). Agricultural policy, politics, and the public interest. Philadelphia (Chapter 9 by R.R. Renne. Land-Grant Institutions, the Public, and the Public Interestl)
- Roland Roger Renne (1960). Montana civic index: a voter's guide. Great Falls, Montana Republican Club
- Roland Roger Renne, J Wesley Hoffmann (1960). The Montana citizen. Helena, MT State Pub. Co.
- Roland Roger Renne (1963). Trade and aid in a troubled world: remarks at the University of Nebraska Conference on Trade and Aid
- Roland Roger Renne (1974). Agricultural universities in India. Urbana-Champaign, University of Illinois
- Roland Roger Renne (1974). Alberta and Montana agriculture, trade, and tourism. Bozeman, MSU Agricultural Economics & Economics Dept.
- Roland Roger Renne (1976). The role of agricultural economists: the next 100 years or Less. Bozeman, MSU Agricultural Economics & Economics Dept.
- Roland Roger Renne (1977). A survey of Montana manufacturing exporters. Bozeman, MSU Agricultural Economics & Economics Dept.

== Resources ==
Party political offices
Preceded by Paul Cannon	Democratic nominee for Governor of Montana; 1964	Succeeded by Forrest H. Anderson
