= Montana State Treasurer =

State Treasurer of Montana
- State seal
- Type: State Treasurer
- Constituting instrument: Montana Constitution of 1889
- Formation: 1889
- First holder: Richard O. Hickman
- Final holder: Hollis G. Connors
- Abolished: 1977
- Succession: Four years, nonrenewable

The State Treasurer of Montana was an elected constitutional officer in the executive branch of the state government of Montana, and was responsible for directly overseeing the financial operations of state government. It was created in the 1889 Constitution and was abolished following the adoption of the 1972 Constitution. Following the ratification of the 1972 Constitution, the office's duties were transferred to the Montana Department of Administration.

== List of territorial treasurers ==
- John J. Hull (1865–1866)
- John S. Rockfellow (1866–1867)
- William G. Barkley (1867–1871)
- Richard O. Hickman (1871–1875)
- Daniel H. Weston (1875–1887)
- William G. Preuitt (1887–1889)

== List of state treasurers ==
Parties

Democratic (10) Republican (17)

#	Image	Name	Term of office	Party
1		Richard O. Hickman	1889–1893	Republican
2		Frederick W. Wright	1893–1897	Republican
3		Timothy E. Collins	1897–1901	Democratic
4		A. H. Barret	1901–1905	Democratic
5		James H. Rice	1905–1909	Republican
6		Elmer E. Esselstyn	1909–1913	Republican
7		William C. Rae	1913–1917	Democratic
8		H. L. Hart	1917–1921	Republican
9		J. W. Walker	1921–1923	Republican
10		O. H. Junood	1923–1925	Republican
11		Wilfred E. Harmon	1925–1929	Republican
12		F. E. Williams	1929–1933	Republican
13		James Brett	1933–1937	Democratic
14		Ray Shannon	1937–1941	Democratic
15		Thomas E. Carey	1941–1944	Democratic
16		T. H. MacDonald	1944–1945	Republican
17		George P. Porter	1945–1949	Republican
18		Neil Fisher	1949	Democratic
19		Alta E. Fisher	1949–1951	Democratic
20		John E. Henry	1951–1953	Republican
21		Charles L. Sheridan	1953	Republican
22		Edna Hinman	1953–1957	Republican
23		Horace Casey	1957–1961	Republican
24		Edna Hinman	1961–1965	Republican
25		Henry H. Anderson	1965–1969	Democratic
26		Alex B. Stephenson	1969–1973	Republican
27		Hollis Connors	1973–1977	Republican

== See also ==
- List of governors of Montana
- List of lieutenant governors of Montana
- List of attorneys general of Montana
- Political party strength in Montana
