= David F. James =

American politician

Lieutenant Governor of Montana
- In office 1962–1965
- Governor: Tim Babcock
- Preceded by: Tim Babcock
- Succeeded by: Ted James

Personal details
- Born: December 6, 1905 Mason City, Iowa, U.S.
- Died: July 7, 1996 (aged 90) Chester, Iowa, U.S.
- Political party: Democratic
- Spouse: Lillian A. Meldrum James (m. 1929; died 1998)

David F. James (December 6, 1905 – July 7, 1996) was an American farmer and politician. He acted as Lieutenant Governor of Montana, serving from 1962 to 1965. James was a Freemason.

== See also ==
- List of lieutenant governors of Montana

Political offices
Preceded by Tim Babcock	Lieutenant Governor of Montana; 1962–1965	Succeeded by Ted James
