= Tim Babcock =

American politician (1919–2015)

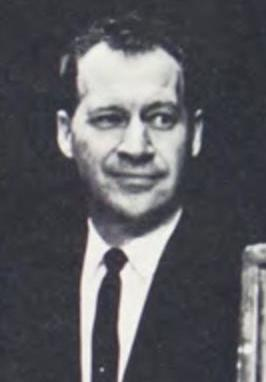

16th Governor of Montana
- In office January 25, 1962 – January 6, 1969
- Lieutenant: David James (Acting); Ted James
- Preceded by: Donald Nutter
- Succeeded by: Forrest Anderson

22nd Lieutenant Governor of Montana
- In office January 2, 1961 – January 25, 1962
- Governor: Donald Nutter
- Preceded by: Paul Cannon
- Succeeded by: David James (Acting)

Member of the Montana House of Representatives

Personal details
- Born: Timothy Milford Babcock; October 27, 1919 Littlefork, Minnesota, U.S.
- Died: April 7, 2015 (aged 95) Helena, Montana, U.S.
- Party: Republican
- Spouse: Betty Lee (m. 1941; died 2013)

Timothy Milford Babcock (October 27, 1919 – April 7, 2015) was an American politician who served as the 16th Governor of Montana from 1962 to 1969.

== Early life ==
Babcock was born in Littlefork, Minnesota, the son of Olive (Rinehart) and Erwin Babcock. He later moved to Glendive, Montana and graduated from Dawson County High School in 1939. He married Betty Lee on September 21, 1941, and they had two children. After graduating from Dawson County High School in 1939, he worked at a Douglas Aircraft factory in California. In 1944, he enlisted in the US Army as an infantryman, and served with the 394th Infantry Regiment, 99th Infantry Division in the European Theater during World War II. He fought at Elsenborn Ridge, part of the Battle of the Bulge. He later took part in the capture of the Remagen Bridge, where he was awarded a Bronze Star Medal for valor.

== Career ==
Babcock served three terms in the Montana Legislature prior to being elected lieutenant governor in 1960. He became governor in 1962 upon the death of Governor Donald Nutter. During his tenure, he proposed a three-percent sales tax to support the state government, and moderated the budget signed by Governor Nutter. In 1964, Babcock endorsed Barry Goldwater of Arizona for the Republican presidential nomination. Democrat Lyndon B. Johnson of Texas, however, was an easy winner that year of Montana's then four electoral votes. He ran for re-election in 1964 against Roland Renne, the former President of Montana State College and the Democratic nominee. Following a close campaign, Babcock was narrowly re-elected over Renne. From 1964 to 1965, he was a member of the National Governors' Conference Executive Committee, and he chaired the Western Governors' Conference from 1966 to 1967.

In 1966, he ran against incumbent United States Senator Lee Metcalf, and despite the fact that Democrats nationwide lost three Senate seats that year, Metcalf not only defeated Babcock, but increased his margin of victory from 1960.

When Babcock ran for re-election in 1968, he faced a stiff challenge in the Republican primary from Ted James, who had served with Babcock as his Lieutenant Governor since 1965. Babcock ended up defeating James, and advanced to the general election, where he faced Forrest H. Anderson, the State Attorney General, whom he lost to by a solid margin.

Following his defeat, he was appointed by then-President Richard Nixon to the National Advisory Committee on Oceans and Atmosphere.

In 1969, Babcock, who was a close friend of Nixon, was hired by Armand Hammer's Occidental Petroleum as a vice president and as Hammer's lobbyist with access not only to the White House but also to Babcock's friend President Nixon.

He was a delegate to the Republican National Convention eleven times and served on the National Republican Committee in 1997 and 2000.

In 1978, Babcock and his wife wrote a book: Challenges: Above & Beyond.

== Illegal financial support of Nixon's Watergate fund ==
In September 1972, Armand Hammer made three illegal contributions totaling $54,000 to Richard Nixon's Watergate fund through friends of Babcock, who had been a vice president of Hammer's Occidental Petroleum, after which both Babcock and Hammer pleaded guilty to charges involving illegal contributions. In August 1989, George H. W. Bush pardoned Hammer for the illegal contributions to aid Nixon's re-election in 1972.

== Personal life and death ==
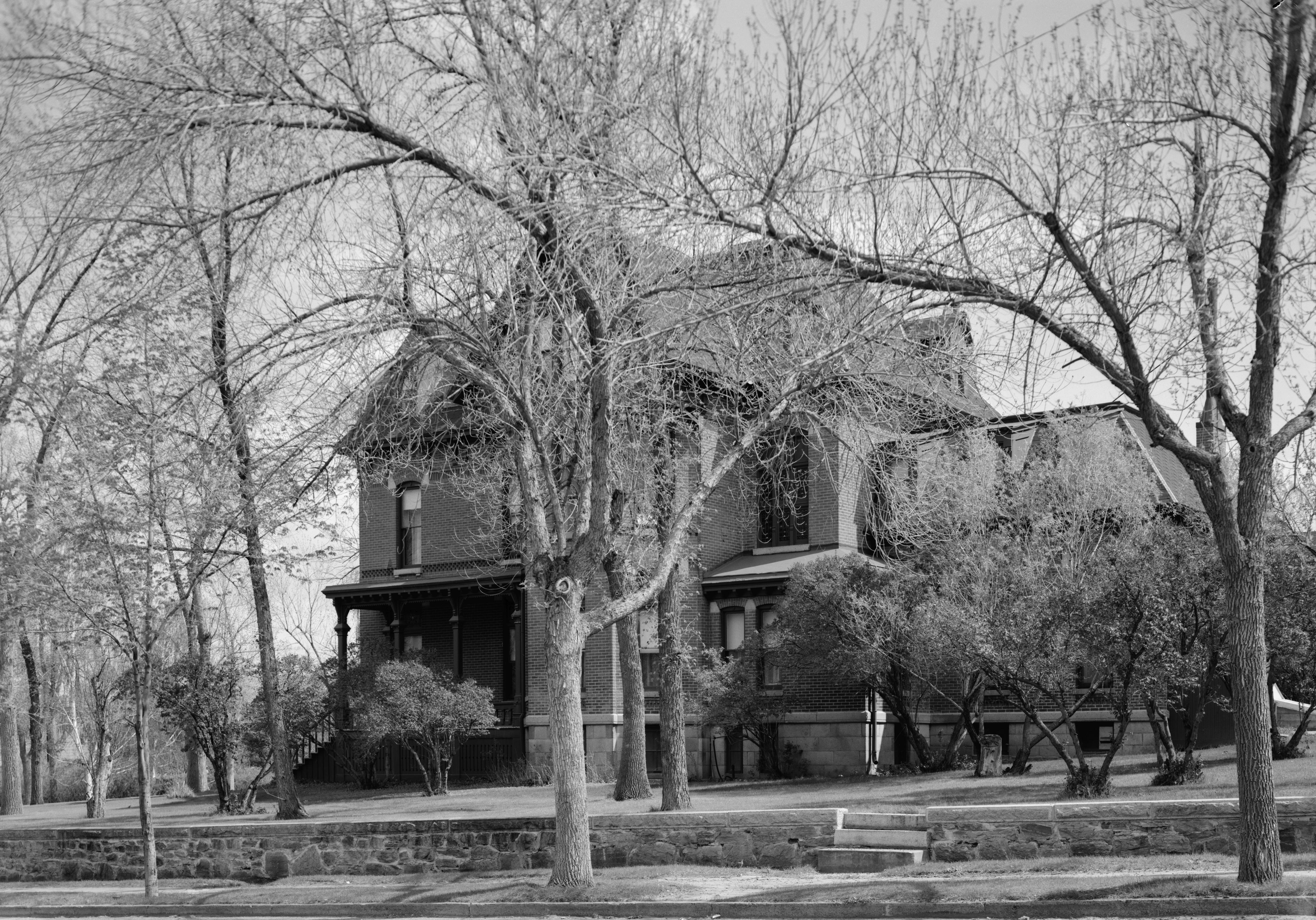
The Hauser Mansion

Babcock purchased the Hauser Mansion in Helena in 1969. Built for Governor Samuel Thomas Hauser, it is listed on the National Register of Historic Places.

On April 7, 2015, Babcock died in Helena, Montana, aged 95.

Political offices
Preceded by Paul Cannon	Lieutenant Governor of Montana; 1961–1962	Succeeded by David F. James
Preceded by Donald Nutter	Governor of Montana; 1962–1969	Succeeded by Forrest Anderson
Party political offices
Preceded by Donald Nutter	Republican nominee for Governor of Montana; 1964, 1968	Succeeded by Ed Smith
Preceded by Orvin Fjare	Republican nominee for Senator from Montana (Class 2); 1966	Succeeded by Henry Hibbard
