= 1964 Montana gubernatorial election =

- November 3, 1964
- Turnout: 85.80%▲0.10
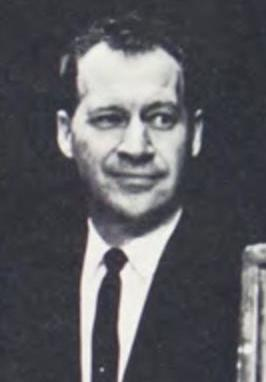

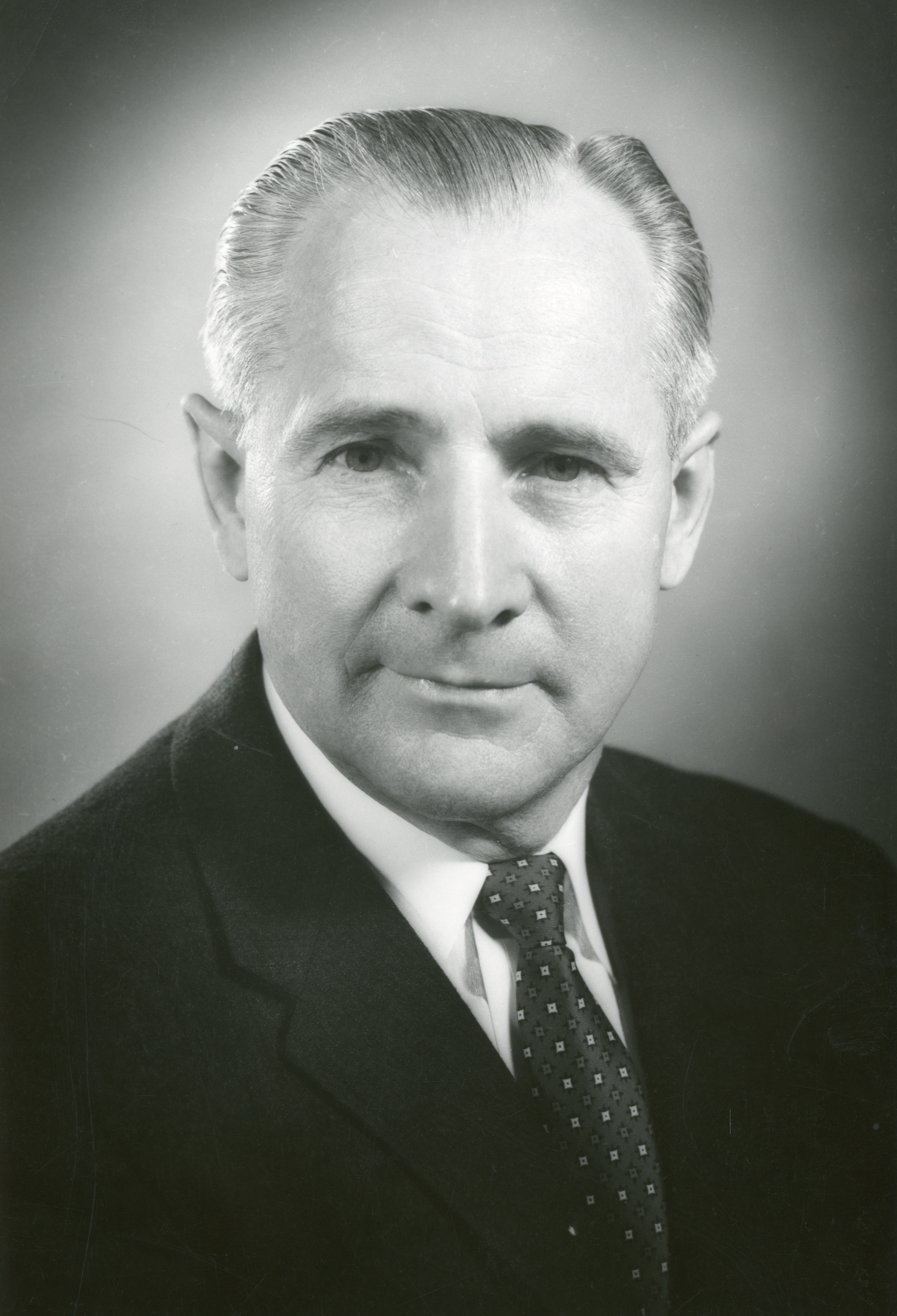
Nominee	Tim Babcock	Roland Renne
Party	Republican	Democratic
Popular vote	144,113	136,862
Percentage	51.29%	48.71%
- County results Babcock: 50–60% 60–70% 70–80% Renne: 50–60% 60–70% 70–80%
Governor before election
Tim Babcock
Republican
Elected Governor
Tim Babcock
Republican

The 1964 Montana gubernatorial election took place on November 3, 1964. Incumbent Governor of Montana Tim M. Babcock, who became Governor upon the death of previous Governor Donald Grant Nutter, ran for re-election. He won the Republican primary unopposed, and advanced to the general election, where he faced Roland Renne, the former President of Montana State College and the Democratic nominee, in the general election. Despite the fact that then-President Lyndon B. Johnson won the state handily in that year's presidential election, Babcock managed to narrowly defeat Renne to win his second and final term as governor.

== Democratic primary ==
=== Candidates ===
- Roland Renne, former President of Montana State College
- Mike Kuchera, furniture dealer

=== Results ===
Democratic Party primary results
Party	Candidate	Votes	%
Democratic	Roland Renne	71,967	55.93
Democratic	Mike Kuchera	56,710	44.07
Total votes		128,677	100.00

== Republican primary ==
=== Candidates ===
- Tim M. Babcock, incumbent Governor of Montana

=== Results ===
Republican Primary results
Party	Candidate	Votes	%
Republican	Tim M. Babcock (incumbent)	56,425	100.00
Total votes		56,425	100.00

== General election ==
=== Results ===
Montana gubernatorial election, 1964
Party	Candidate	Votes	%	±%
Republican	Tim M. Babcock (incumbent)	144,113	51.29%	−3.82%
Democratic	Roland Renne	136,862	48.71%	+3.82%
Majority		7,251	2.58%	−7.63%
Turnout		280,975		
Republican hold		Swing		
