= Hollis Connors =

American politician

Montana State Treasurer
- In office January 1, 1973 – January 3, 1977
- Governor: Thomas Lee Judge
- Preceded by: Alex B. Stephenson
- Succeeded by: Office abolished

Personal details
- Born: February 21, 1912 Ceylon, Minnesota
- Died: December 15, 1993 (aged 81) Milwaukie, Oregon
- Party: Republican
- Spouse: Gene Connors
- Education: Northwestern College of Law (LL.B.)

Hollis Gay Connors (1912–1993) was a Republican politician who served as the 27th (and last elected) Montana State Treasurer from 1973 to 1977.

== Biography ==
Connors was born in Ceylon, Minnesota, and grew up in nearby Redwood Falls, where she graduated from high school. She attended the Northwestern College of Law, receiving her Bachelor of Laws degree in 1949. After graduation, Connors worked for Oregon Supreme Court Justice Harold J. Warner as a law clerk and legal secretary. She moved to Montana in 1951, where she worked with her brother, an insurance underwriter. In 1959, Connors joined the law firm of Skedd, Harris & Massman.

== Montana Supreme Court campaign ==
In 1962, Connors announced that she would run for the Montana Supreme Court against incumbent Justice Stanley M. Doyle. At the time that she announced, she was only the second woman to run for the Montana Supreme Court after Jessie Roscoe unsuccessfully did so in 1944. She announced that she was running for two reasons: "Women should more actively participate in governmental affairs" and that "the courts of the State of Montana belong to the people. They are there for the preservation of the personal and property rights of the people, and they must be preserved."

Connors faced a crowded race and was joined by Gordon Bennett and P.J. Gilfeather, both of whom were Assistant State Attorneys General; Sidney Smith, the former counsel to the State Board of Equalization; and Andrew Sutton, a former Assistant U.S. Attorney General. During the campaign, Connors's campaign was discussed as a novelty; she was referred to as "Chic Hollis Gay Connors" and as "the only woman in the field" as the male candidates were referred to by their names.

Ultimately, Connors narrowly missed advancing to a runoff against Justice Doyle, who placed first in the primary with 29% of the vote. Despite running neck-and-neck with Bennett for most of election night, Connors ultimately fell behind him, winning 17% of the vote to his 20%. After the election, Connors endorsed Doyle for re-election, urging her supporters to vote for him over Bennett.

== Post-Supreme Court campaign ==
Connors ran for Mayor of Townsend, Montana, in 1965, challenging incumbent Austin Hooper for re-election. Hooper narrowly defeated Connors, winning 251 votes to her 191. In 1967, Connors was named as the Deputy Director of Montana Legal Services.

== Montana State Treasurer ==
In 1972, Connors announced that she would run for State Treasurer. Connors ran in the Republican primary and she faced former Yellowstone County Treasurer Opal Eggert, who had unsuccessfully run in the 1968 primary for Treasurer. A low-key race unfolded between Eggert and Connors, with Eggert seen as the slight frontrunner. Connors defeated Eggert by a wide margin, however, winning 56% of the vote to Eggert's 44%.

Connors advanced to the general election, where she faced Great Falls Mayor John McLaughlin, the Democratic nominee. During the race, there was speculation that Connors and McLaughlin were running for a position that would soon not exist. In the June primary, voters adopted the Constitution of Montana, which removed the Treasurer from the Constitution and opened the door for the legislature to abolish it.

Connors ultimately edged out McLaughlin by a narrow margin, winning 53% of the vote to his 47%. Despite the fact that Richard Nixon won Montana in a landslide in the presidential election, voters largely split their ballots in down-ballot races, electing Democrat Thomas Lee Judge as Governor, re-electing Democratic U.S. Senator Lee Metcalf, and electing a mix of Democrats and Republicans to state executive offices.

After her inauguration as Treasurer, Connors urged the state legislature to ratify the Equal Rights Amendment to the U.S. Constitution, noting that an identical provision had been included in the 1972 constitutional rewrite. She also argued for the preservation of the elected treasurer's office, arguing that the office played an important role in the state's system of separated powers. Connors drafted legislation herself to preserve the office in state government, and the legislature ultimately adopted legislation continuing the office. However, Governor Judge vetoed the bill and the legislature lacked the votes to override the veto, effectively ending the office's existence by 1977.

At the close of the term to which Connors was elected, a legal question arose as to whether she could remain in office until the duties of Treasurer were formally transferred to another official. Connors noted that under the 1972 Constitution, elected officials would remain in their offices until the end of the terms to which they were elected and until the legislature provided for a successor. By January 1977, the end of Connors's term, the legislature had not passed a statute formally transferring responsibility, and Connors continued to show up for work. The Director of the State Department of Administration requested an advisory opinion from Attorney General Mike Greely as to whether Connors remained in office. Connors supported the request for an opinion, saying, "All I want is something formal that absolves me from any further liability." Ultimately, Greely ruled that Connors's term had expired and that she was temporarily succeeded by her deputy, Versa Freseman, until the legislature transferred the office's responsibility.

After Connors left office, she came under fire for her tenure as Treasurer. Connors was accused by a former state employee of working just a few hours in the office every day and not showing up to work on other days, charges that she denied. Additionally, a subsequent investigation by the Legislative Auditor discovered that the Treasurer's office managed the cash reserves of the state so poorly that it "resulted in a loss of control over the state's cash," costing the state around $1 million in potential interest money.

Preceded by Alex B. Stephenson	Montana State Treasurer; 1973–1977	Succeeded by Office abolished
