= Forrest H. Anderson =

American judge (1913–1989)

17th Governor of Montana
- In office January 6, 1969 – January 1, 1973
- Lieutenant: Thomas Lee Judge
- Preceded by: Tim Babcock
- Succeeded by: Thomas Lee Judge

Attorney General of Montana
- In office January 7, 1957 – January 6, 1969
- Governor: J. Hugo Aronson; Donald G. Nutter; Tim Babcock
- Preceded by: Arnold Olsen
- Succeeded by: Robert L. Woodahl

Justice of the Montana Supreme Court
- In office 1953–1957

Member of the Montana House of Representatives
- In office 1943–1945

Personal details
- Born: Forrest Howard Anderson; January 30, 1913 Helena, Montana, U.S.
- Died: July 20, 1989 (aged 76) Helena, Montana, U.S.
- Party: Democratic
- Spouse: Margaret Evelyn Samson
- Children: 3
- Education: University of Montana; Columbus School of Law

Forrest Howard Anderson (January 30, 1913 – July 20, 1989) was an American politician, attorney, and judge who served as the 17th Governor of Montana from 1969 to 1973. Prior to this, he served as the Attorney General of Montana from 1957 to 1969 and as a member of the Montana Supreme Court.

== Biography ==
Anderson was born in Helena, Montana. His father, Oscar Anderson, was an immigrant from Sweden and his mother, Mary O'Keefe, was an Irish immigrant. He completed his undergraduate degree at the University of Montana and obtained his law degree from the Columbus School of Law at Catholic University of America in Washington, DC. He was admitted to the practice of law in 1938. He married Margaret Evelyn Samson on January 24, 1941, and they had three children.

== Career ==
Anderson was a Democrat. He served in the Montana House of Representatives from 1943 to 1945. He was a Lewis and Clark County Attorney from 1945 to 1947. He was also an Associate Justice on the Montana Supreme Court from 1953 to 1957, a delegate to the 1956 Democratic National Convention, and served three terms as Montana Attorney General from 1957 to 1968.

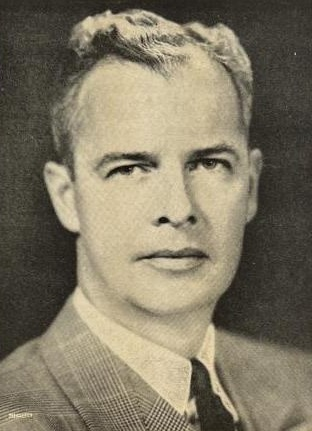
Anderson in 1956

As Attorney General, he came to prominence during the 1959 State Prison riot, when he personally negotiated with the prisoners. Running for Governor in 1968 he defeated the incumbent, Governor Tim Babcock, largely on an anti-sales tax platform notable for the campaign slogan, "Pay More, What For?"

Elected as Governor of Montana in 1968, Anderson was sworn in on January 6, 1969, and served until January 1, 1973. In his influential and controversial single term in office, he considered his greatest accomplishment to be the reorganization of the executive branch: he oversaw the consolidation of 161 state agencies, boards, commissions and councils into 19 departments. He chaired the bipartisan Montana Commission on Executive Reorganization, which drafted the constitutional amendment to reduce the number of executive agencies. In the 1970 election, voters approved the amendment by a 70-percent margin. The reorganization effort faced opposition from the many boards slated to be dissolved. However, the legislature passed the necessary legislation by the last day of the 1971 session. Anderson called a special legislative session to finalize the details of implementation. On March 10, 1971, he signed the Executive Reorganization Law.

The controversies he faced as governor included a major dispute with the Fish and Game Commission and its commissioner, Frank Dunkle, over environmental issues and sportsmen's access to state lands. The biggest political clash he faced occurred in 1971, when the Montana Legislature debated a sales tax. When the Legislature deadlocked, Anderson called them back into special session twice, and finally the issue was put to a ballot referendum, where it was soundly rejected. During his tenure, another major accomplishment was his establishment of the Board of Investments, which was able to remove state funds from low yield bank accounts and invest them in higher yield accounts.

Anderson strongly supported and authorized the 1972 Constitutional Convention, then helped facilitate its implementation after it was ratified that year. Anderson anticipated that opponents of the new constitution would challenge it in the Montana Supreme Court, and he had his legal counsel prepare the proclamation of ratification while the Board of Elections commissioners were still tallying the votes. Secretary of State Frank Murray tried to delay the proclamation on a technicality, saying that he did not see Anderson sign it. Anderson responded sarcastically, "Frank, I'm going to sign this again. Frank, are you watching me? I'm writing, Frank. Now, Mr. Secretary of State, attest to my approval of this document; this is your legal duty." The 1972 constitution overcame legal challenges and remains in place today.

Anderson's critics accused him of making backroom deals for his own profit throughout his political career. They pointed to a real estate deal he made during his term as attorney general. Anderson bought property on Holter Lake from the Montana Power Company for $1,800, and later sold it for more than $30,000.

== Later life ==
Anderson did not run for a second term because of poor health, and was succeeded in office by his lieutenant governor, Tom Judge. In 1973 and 1974, he served on a regional economic commission. However, further public service became impossible as his health deteriorated. An operation to correct his hiatal hernia failed. In constant pain from an intestinal condition and forced to live on liquids, Anderson retired in 1974.

In 1989, Anderson, who had been in failing health for years, died of a self-inflicted gunshot wound in his home. He was cremated and his ashes are interred in Forestvale Cemetery, Helena, Lewis and Clark County, Montana. The Forrest H. Anderson Memorial Bridge which crosses the Missouri River in Craig is named in his honor. There is a marker at 47.07023°N 111.956087°W near Craig close to the river and highway bridge which memorializes Anderson and his passion for fishing and hunting.

Party political offices
Preceded by Roland Renne	Democratic nominee for Governor of Montana; 1968	Succeeded by Thomas Lee Judge
Legal offices
Preceded by Arnold Olsen	Attorney General of Montana; 1957–1969	Succeeded by Robert L. Woodahl
Political offices
Preceded by Tim M. Babcock	Governor of Montana; 1969 – 1973	Succeeded by Thomas Lee Judge
