= Ted James (Montana politician) =

American politician

Lieutenant Governor of Montana
- In office 1965–1969
- Governor: Tim Babcock
- Preceded by: David F. James
- Succeeded by: Thomas Lee Judge

Personal details
- Born: June 1, 1918; Sand Coulee, Montana, U.S.
- Died: May 14, 1995 (aged 76); Great Falls, Montana, U.S.

Ted James (June 1, 1918, Sand Coulee, Montana – May 14, 1995, Great Falls, Montana) was an American politician. He served two terms as the district attorney for Cascade County, Montana before being elected as Lieutenant Governor of Montana, serving from 1965 to 1969. He ran for the governorship in 1968, but was defeated in the primary by Tim Babcock, who went on to lose re-election. He was appointed chairman of University of Montana board of regents, serving from 1973 to 1982. He has been described as a moderate Republican.

Political offices
Preceded by David F. James	Lieutenant Governor of Montana; 1965–1969	Succeeded by Thomas Lee Judge
