= Montana =

U.S. state

- State
- Flag Seal
- Nicknames: Big Sky Country, The Treasure State
- Motto(s): "Oro y Plata" (Spanish) "Gold and Silver"
- Anthem: "Montana"
- Location of Montana within the United States
- Country: United States
- Before statehood: Montana Territory
- Admitted to the Union: November 8, 1889 (41st)
- Capital: Helena
- Largest city: Billings
- Largest county or equivalent: Yellowstone
- Largest metro and urban areas: Billings

Government
  - Governor: Greg Gianforte (R)
  - Lieutenant Governor: Kristen Juras (R)
- Legislature: Legislature
  - Upper house: Senate
  - Lower house: House of Representatives
- Judiciary: Montana Supreme Court
- U.S. senators: Steve Daines (R); Tim Sheehy (R)
- U.S. House delegation: 1: Ryan Zinke (R); 2: Troy Downing (R); (list)

Area
  - Total: 147,000 sq mi (380,800 km^{2})
  - Land: 145,550 sq mi (376,980 km^{2})
  - Water: 1,491 sq mi (3,862 km^{2})
  - Rank: 4th

Dimensions
  - Length: 250 mi (410 km)
  - Width: 631 mi (1,015 km)
- Elevation: 3,410 ft (1,040 m)
- Highest elevation (Granite Peak): 12,807 ft (3,903.5 m)
- Lowest elevation (Kootenai River at Idaho border): 1,827 ft (557 m)

Population (2025)
  - Total: ▲1,144,694
  - Rank: 43rd
  - Density: 7.8/sq mi (3/km^{2})
  - Rank: 48th
  - Median household income: $70,800 (2023)
  - Income rank: 34th
- Demonyms: Montanan

Language
  - Official language: English
- Time zone: UTC−07:00 (Mountain)
  - Summer (DST): UTC−06:00 (MDT)
- USPS abbreviation: MT
- ISO 3166 code: US-MT
- Traditional abbreviation: Mont.
- Latitude: 44° 21′ N to 49° N
- Longitude: 104° 2′ W to 116° 3′ W
- Website: mt.gov

State symbols of Montana
List of state symbols
- Flag of Montana

- Seal of Montana
- Bird: Western meadowlark
- Butterfly: Mourning cloak
- Fish: Westslope cutthroat trout
- Flower: Bitterroot
- Mammal: Grizzly bear
- Tree: Ponderosa pine
- Fossil: Maiasaura peeblesorum
- Gemstone: Sapphire, Agate

State route marker

Montana (/mɒnˈtænə/ mon-TAN-ə) is a landlocked state in the Mountain West subregion of the Western United States. It is bordered by Idaho to the west, North Dakota to the east, South Dakota to the southeast, Wyoming to the south, and the Canadian provinces of Alberta, British Columbia, and Saskatchewan to the north. It is the fourth-largest state by area, but the eighth-least populous state and the third-least densely populated state. Its capital is Helena, while the most populous city is Billings. The western half of the state contains numerous mountain ranges, particularly the Rocky Mountains, while the eastern half is characterized by western prairie terrain and badlands, with smaller mountain ranges found throughout the state.

Most of Montana came under American sovereignty with the Louisiana Purchase from France in 1803 and was explored by the Lewis and Clark Expedition shortly thereafter. Fur trappers followed and were the main economic activity in the area until gold was discovered in 1858. The ensuing gold rush, along with the passage of the Homestead Acts in 1862, brought large numbers of American settlers to Montana. Rapid population growth and development culminated in statehood on November 8, 1889. Mining, particularly around Butte and Helena, would remain the state's main economic engine through the mid-20th century.

Montana has no official nickname but has several unofficial ones, most notably "Big Sky Country", "The Treasure State", "Land of the Shining Mountains", and "The Last Best Place". Its economy is primarily based on agriculture, including ranching and cereal grain farming. Other significant economic resources include oil, gas, coal, mining, and lumber. The health care, service, defense, and government sectors are also significant to the state's economy. Montana's fastest-growing sector is tourism, with 12.6 million tourists visiting the state each year as of 2019. In 2024 the number reached 13.7 million, the highest ever.

== Etymology ==
The name "Montana" comes from the Spanish word montaña, which in turn comes from the Latin word montanea, meaning "mountain" or more broadly "mountainous country". Montaña del Norte ("Northern Mountain") was the name given by early Spanish explorers to the entire mountainous region of the west. The name "Montana" was added in 1863 to a bill by the United States House Committee on Territories (chaired at the time by James Ashley of Ohio) for the territory that would become Idaho Territory.

The name was changed by representatives Henry Wilson (Massachusetts) and Benjamin F. Harding (Oregon), who complained that "Montana" had "no meaning". Alternative names included Jefferson. When Ashley presented a bill to establish a temporary government in 1864 for a new territory to be carved out of Idaho, he again chose Montana Territory. This time, representative Samuel Cox, also of Ohio, objected to the name. Cox complained that the name was a misnomer given that most of the territory was not mountainous, and thought a Native American name would be more appropriate than a Spanish one. Other names, such as Shoshone, were suggested, but the Committee on Territories decided that they had discretion to choose the name, so the original name of Montana was adopted.

== History ==
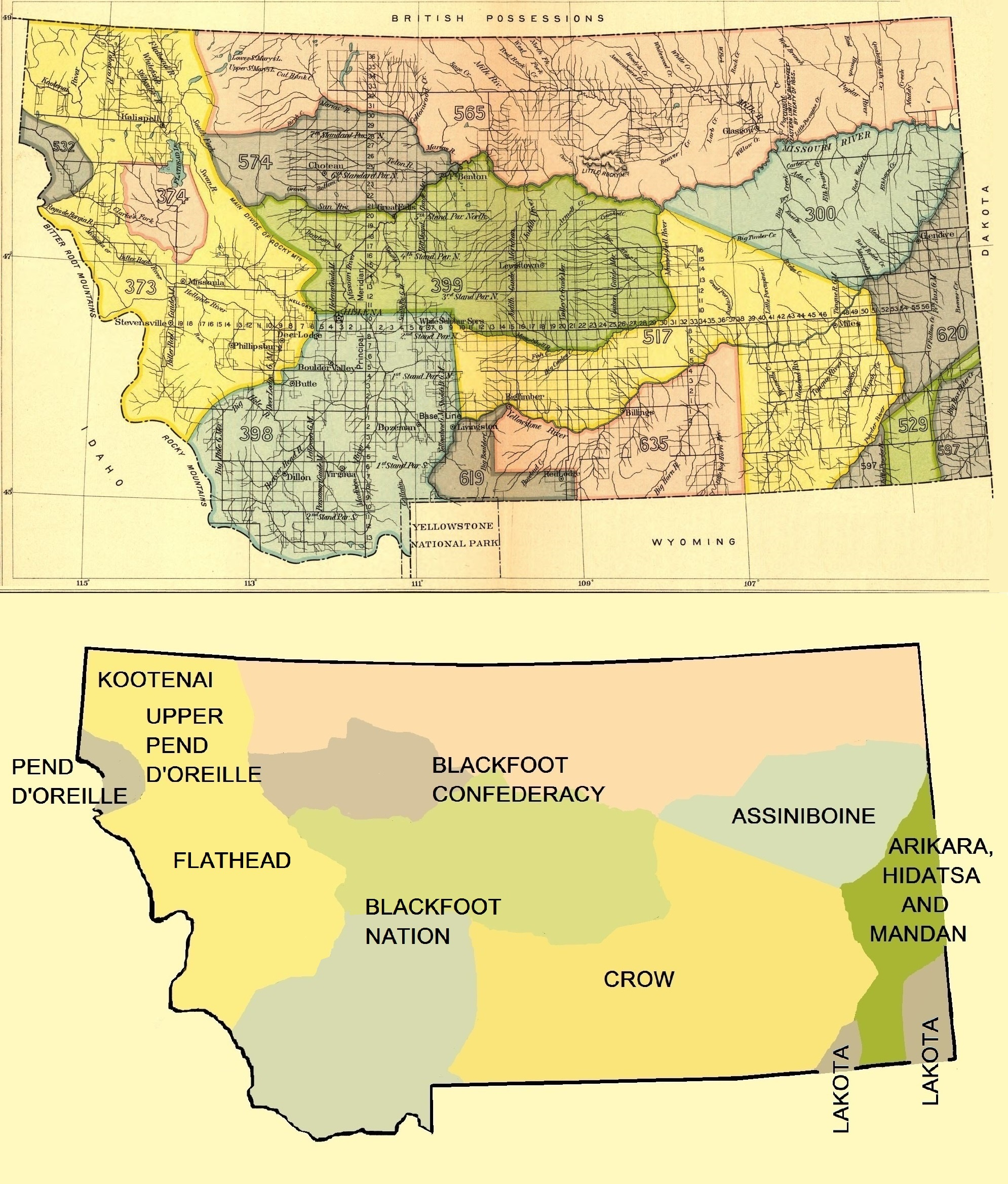
Early Indian treaty territories in Montana

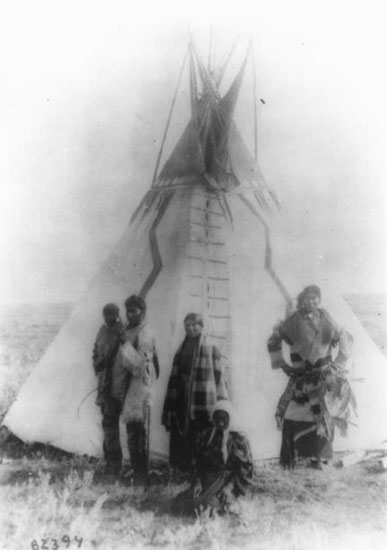
Assiniboine family, Montana, 1890–91

For thousands of years, various indigenous peoples have inhabited the land that is now Montana. Historic tribes encountered by Europeans and settlers from the United States included the Crow in the south-central area, the Cheyenne and Lakota in the southeast, the Blackfeet, Assiniboine, and Gros Ventres in the central and north-central area, and the Kootenai and Salish the (Séliš or "Flathead") in the west. The (Ql̓ispé or Pend d'Oreilles) and Kalispel tribes lived near Flathead Lake and the western mountains, respectively. A part of southeastern Montana was used as a corridor between the Crows and the related Hidatsas in North Dakota.

As part of the Missouri River watershed, all of the land in Montana east of the Continental Divide was part of the Louisiana Purchase in 1803, except for a tiny portion in the northeast that is part of the Hudson Bay drainage. Subsequent to and particularly in the decades following the Lewis and Clark Expedition, European, Canadian and American traders operated a fur trade, trading with indigenous peoples in both western and eastern portions of the area. Though the increased interaction between fur traders and indigenous peoples frequently proved to be a profitable partnership, conflicts broke out when indigenous interests were threatened, such as the conflict between American trappers and the Blackfeet. Indigenous peoples in the region were also decimated by diseases introduced by fur traders to which they had no immunity. The trading post Fort Raymond (1807–1811) was constructed in Crow Indian country in 1807. Until the Oregon Treaty of 1846, land west of the continental divide was disputed between the British and U.S. governments and was known as the Oregon Country. The first permanent settlement by Euro-Americans in what today is Montana was St. Mary's, established in 1841 near present-day Stevensville. In 1847, Fort Benton was built as the uppermost fur-trading post on the Missouri River. In the 1850s, settlers began moving into the Beaverhead and Big Hole valleys from the Oregon Trail and into the Clark's Fork valley.

The first gold discovered in Montana was at Gold Creek near present-day Garrison in 1852. The Gold rush in the region commenced in earnest starting in 1862. A series of major mineral discoveries in the western part of the state found gold, silver, copper, lead, and coal (and later oil) which attracted tens of thousands of miners to the area. The richest of all gold placer diggings was discovered at Alder Gulch, where the town of Virginia City was established. Other rich placer deposits were found at Last Chance Gulch, where the city of Helena now stands, Confederate Gulch, Silver Bow, Emigrant Gulch, and Cooke City. Gold output between 1862 and 1876 reached $144 million, after which silver became even more important. The largest mining operations were at Butte, with important silver deposits and expansive copper deposits. Yogo sapphires are also mined in Montana.

=== Montana Territory ===
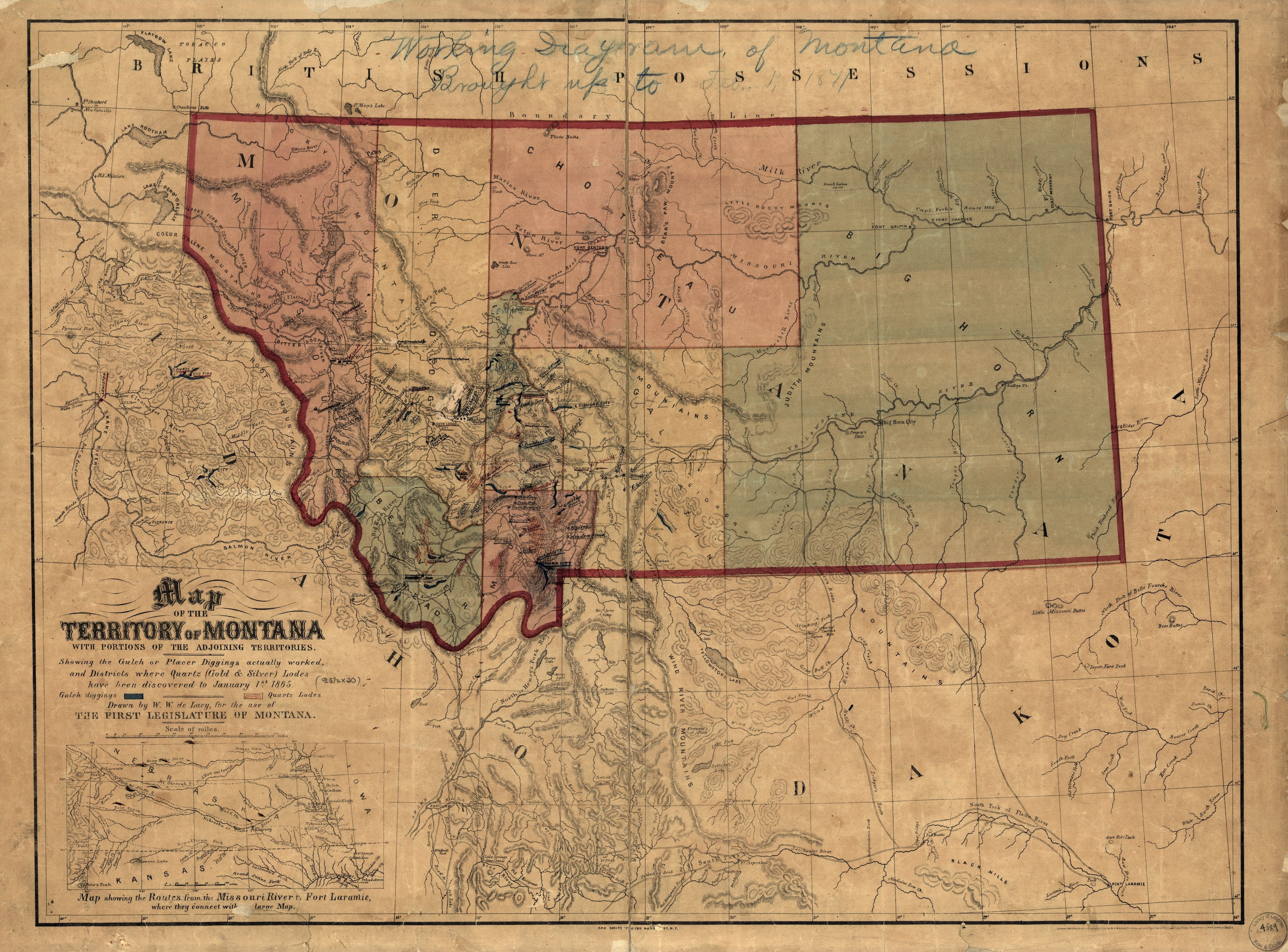
Montana Territory in 1865

Before the creation of Montana Territory (1864–1889), areas within present-day Montana were part of the Oregon Territory (1848–1859), Washington Territory (1853–1863), Idaho Territory (1863–1864), and Dakota Territory (1861–1864). Montana Territory became a territory of the United States on May 26, 1864. The first territorial capital was located at Bannack. Sidney Edgerton served as the first territorial governor. The capital moved to Virginia City in 1865 and to Helena in 1875. In 1870, the non-Indian population of the Montana Territory was 20,595. The Montana Historical Society, founded on February 2, 1865, in Virginia City, is the oldest such institution west of the Mississippi (excluding Louisiana). In 1869 and 1870 respectively, the Cook–Folsom–Peterson and the Washburn–Langford–Doane Expeditions were launched from Helena into the Upper Yellowstone region. The extraordinary discoveries and reports from these expeditions led to the creation of Yellowstone National Park in 1872.

=== Conflicts ===
As settlers began populating Montana from the 1850s through the 1870s, disputes with Native Americans ensued, primarily over land ownership and control. In 1855, Washington Territorial Governor Isaac Stevens negotiated the Hellgate Treaty between the United States government and the Salish, Pend d'Oreille, and Kootenai people of western Montana, which established boundaries for the tribal nations. The treaty was ratified in 1859. While the treaty established what later became the Flathead Indian Reservation, trouble with interpreters and confusion over the terms of the treaty led settlers to believe the Bitterroot Valley was opened to settlement, but the tribal nations disputed those provisions. The Salish remained in the Bitterroot Valley until 1891.

The first U.S. Army post established in Montana was Camp Cooke in 1866, on the Missouri River, to protect steamboat traffic to Fort Benton. More than a dozen additional military outposts were established in the state. Pressure over land ownership and control increased due to discoveries of gold in various parts of Montana and surrounding states. Major battles occurred in Montana during Red Cloud's War, the Great Sioux War of 1876, and the Nez Perce War and in conflicts with Piegan Blackfeet. The most notable were the Marias Massacre (1870), Battle of the Little Bighorn (1876), Battle of the Big Hole (1877), and Battle of Bear Paw (1877). The last recorded conflict in Montana between the U.S. Army and Native Americans occurred in 1887 during the Battle of Crow Agency in the Big Horn country. Native survivors who had signed treaties were generally required to move onto reservations.

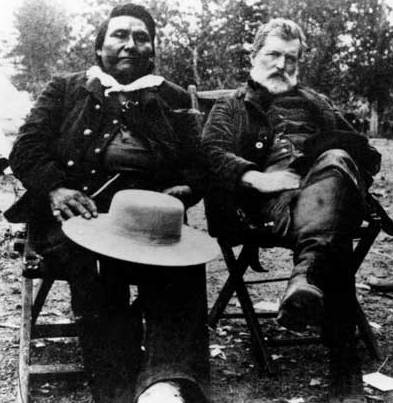
Chief Joseph and Col. John Gibbon met again on the Big Hole Battlefield site in 1889.

Simultaneously with these conflicts, bison, a keystone species and the primary protein source that Native people had survived on for many centuries, were being destroyed. Experts estimate that around 13 million bison roamed Montana in 1870. In 1875, General Philip Sheridan pleaded to a joint session of Congress to authorize the slaughtering of bison herds to deprive Native people of their source of food. By 1884, commercial hunting had brought bison to the verge of extinction; only about 325 bison remained in the entire United States.

=== Cattle ranching ===
Cattle ranching has been central to Montana's history and economy since Johnny Grant began wintering cattle in the Deer Lodge Valley in the 1850s and traded cattle fattened in fertile Montana valleys with emigrants on the Oregon Trail. Nelson Story brought the first Texas Longhorn cattle into the territory in 1866. Granville Stuart, Samuel Hauser, and Andrew J. Davis started a major open-range cattle operation in Fergus County in 1879. The Grant-Kohrs Ranch National Historic Site in Deer Lodge is maintained today as a link to the ranching style of the late 19th century. Operated by the National Park Service, it is a 1,900-acre (7.7 km^{2}) working ranch.

=== Railroads ===
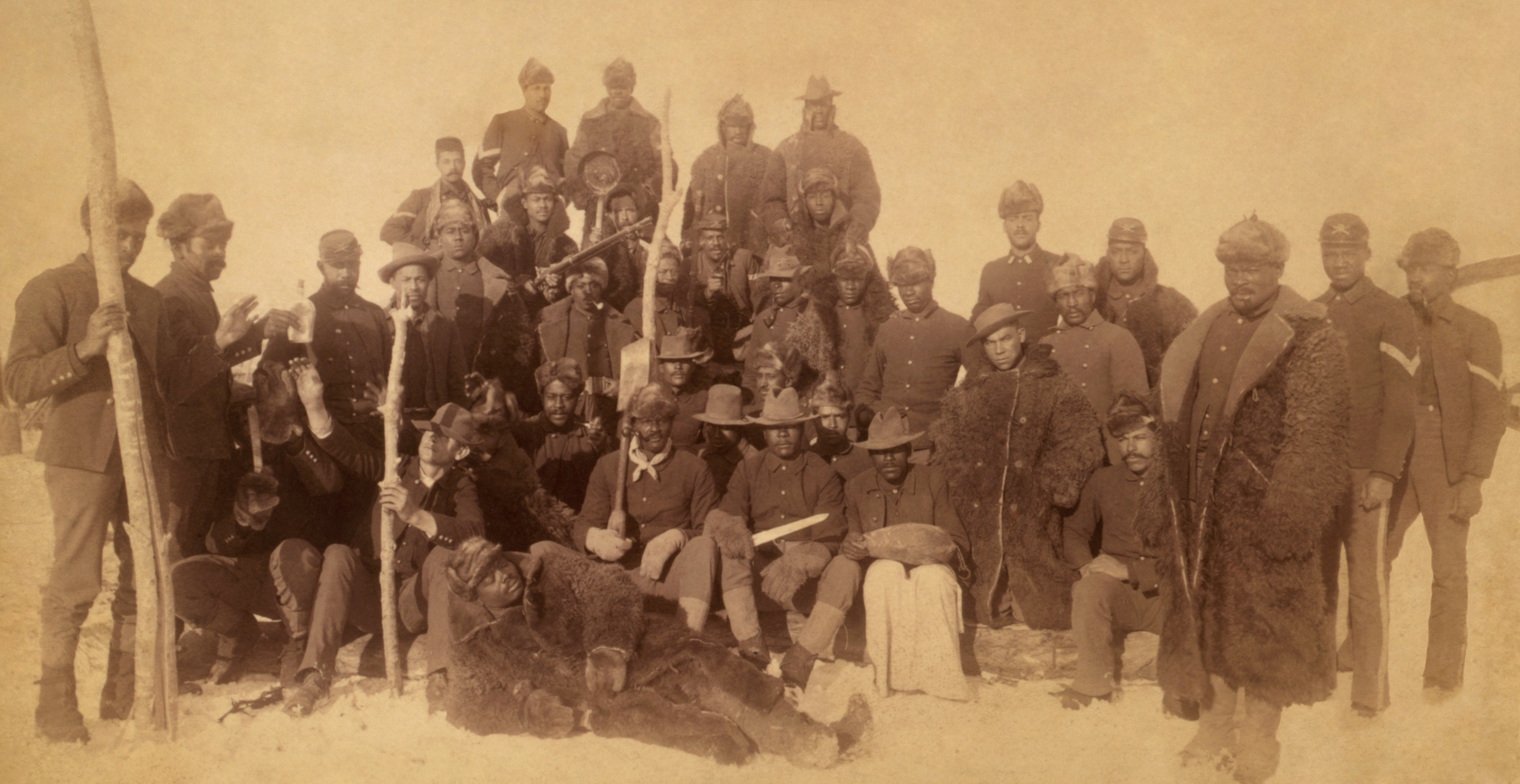
Buffalo Soldiers, Ft. Keogh, Montana, 1890. The nickname was given to the "Black Cavalry" by the Native American tribes they fought.

Tracks of the Northern Pacific Railroad (NPR) reached Montana from the west in 1882 and from the east in 1883. However, the railroad played a major role in sparking tensions with Native American tribes in the 1870s. Jay Cooke, the NPR president, launched major surveys into the Yellowstone valley in 1871, 1872, and 1873, which were challenged forcefully by the Sioux under chief Sitting Bull. These clashes, in part, contributed to the Panic of 1873, a financial crisis that delayed the construction of the railroad into Montana. Surveys in 1874, 1875, and 1876 helped spark the Great Sioux War of 1876. The transcontinental NPR was completed on September 8, 1883, at Gold Creek.

In 1881, the Utah and Northern Railway, a branch line of the Union Pacific, completed a narrow-gauge line from northern Utah to Butte. A number of smaller spur lines operated in Montana from 1881 into the 20th century, including the Oregon Short Line, Montana Railroad, and Milwaukee Road.

Tracks of the Great Northern Railroad (GNR) reached eastern Montana in 1887 and when they reached the northern Rocky Mountains in 1890, the GNR became a significant promoter of tourism to Glacier National Park region. The transcontinental GNR was completed on January 6, 1893, at Scenic, Washington and is known as the Hi Line, being the northernmost transcontinental rail line in the United States.

=== Statehood ===
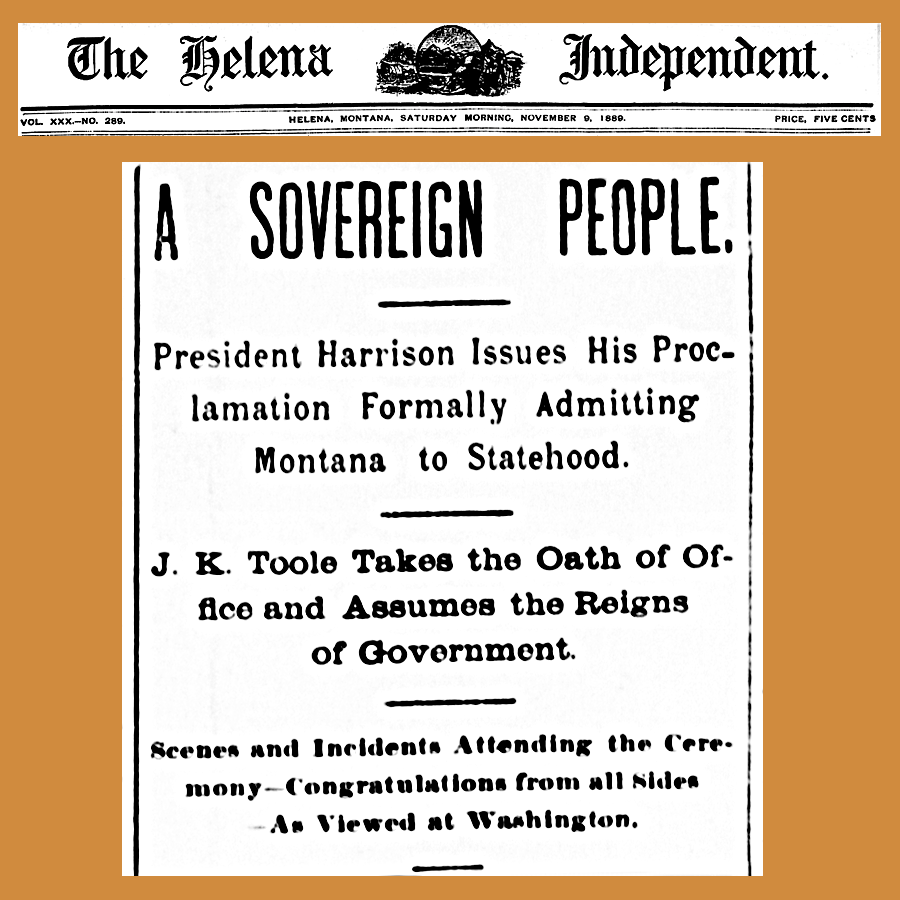
Reporting statehood from Helena: Full article text is here.
- The official telegram:

EXECUTIVE MANSION,
WASHINGTON, D.C. November 7, 1889
To Hon. Joseph K. Toole, Governor of the State of Montana:
The president signed and issued the proclamation declaring Montana a state of the union at 10:40 o'clock this morning.

JAMES G. BLAINE
Secretary of State

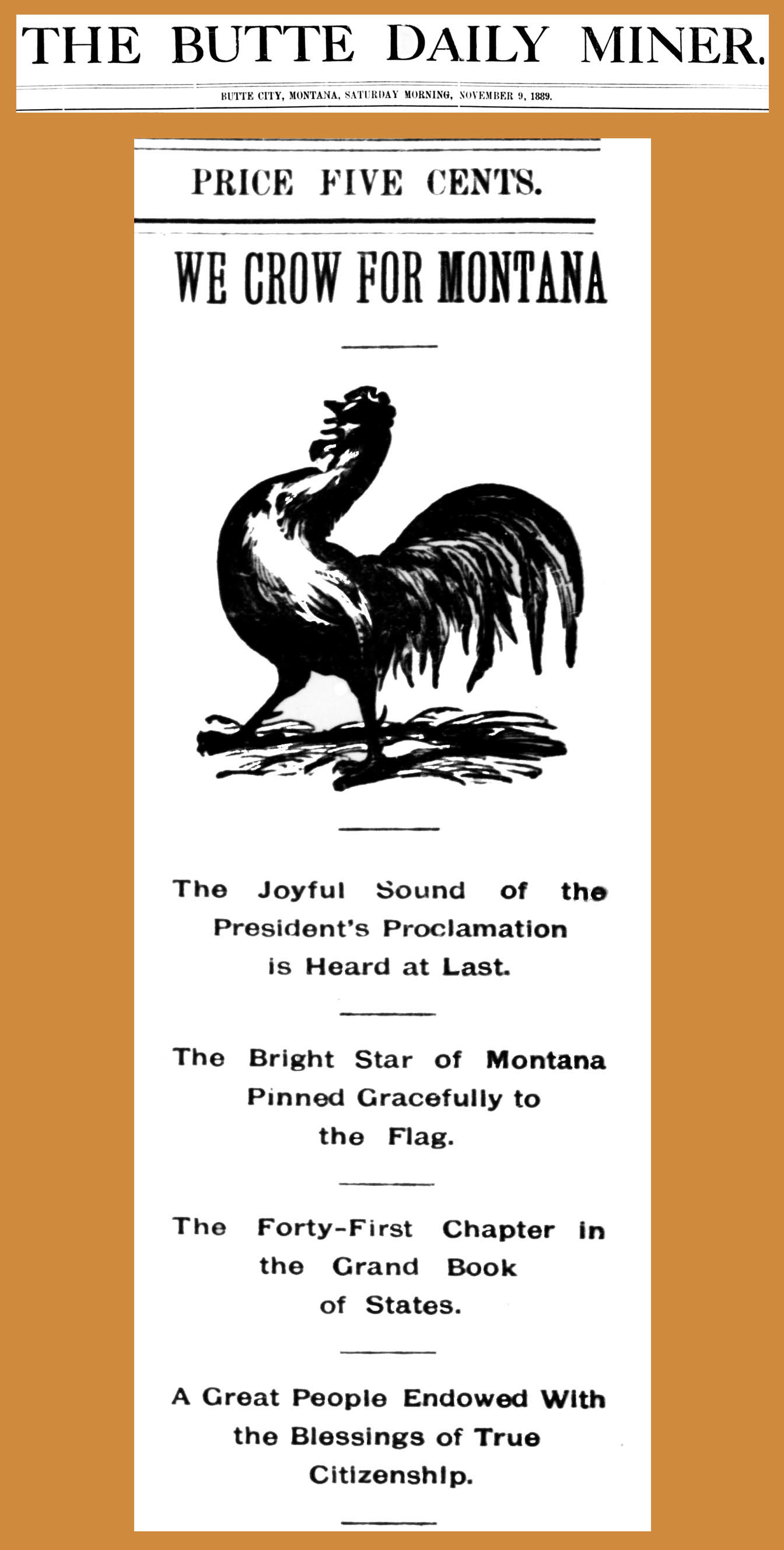
This article in a Butte newspaper celebrates "the blessings of true citizenship".

Under Territorial Governor Thomas Meagher, Montanans held a constitutional convention in 1866 in a failed bid for statehood. A second constitutional convention held in Helena in 1884 produced a constitution ratified 3:1 by Montana citizens in November 1884. For political reasons, Congress did not approve Montana statehood until February 1889 and President Grover Cleveland signed an omnibus bill granting statehood to Montana, North Dakota, South Dakota, and Washington once the appropriate state constitutions were crafted. In July 1889, Montanans convened their third constitutional convention and produced a constitution accepted by the people and the federal government. On November 8, 1889, President Benjamin Harrison proclaimed Montana the union's 41st state. The first state governor was Joseph K. Toole. In the 1880s, Helena (the state capital) had more millionaires per capita than any other United States city.

=== Homesteading ===
The Homestead Act of 1862 provided free land to settlers who could claim and "prove-up" 160 acres (0.65 km^{2}) of federal land in the Midwest and western United States. Montana did not see a large influx of immigrants from this act because 160 acres were usually insufficient to support a family in the arid territory. The first homestead claim under the act in Montana was made by David Carpenter near Helena in 1868. The first claim by a woman was made near Warm Springs Creek by Gwenllian Evans, the daughter of Deer Lodge Montana pioneer, Morgan Evans. By 1880, farms were in the more verdant valleys of central and western Montana, but few were on the eastern plains.

The Desert Land Act of 1877 was passed to allow settlement of arid lands in the west and allotted 640 acres (2.6 km^{2}) to settlers for a fee of $.25 per acre and a promise to irrigate the land. After three years, a fee of one dollar per acre would be paid and the settler would own the land. This act brought mostly cattle and sheep ranchers into Montana, many of whom grazed their herds on the Montana prairie for three years, did little to irrigate the land and then abandoned it without paying the final fees. Some farmers came with the arrival of the Great Northern and Northern Pacific Railroads throughout the 1880s and 1890s, though in relatively small numbers.

Mennonite family in Montana, c. 1937

In the early 1900s, James J. Hill of the Great Northern began to promote settlement in the Montana prairie to fill his trains with settlers and goods. Other railroads followed suit. In 1902, the Reclamation Act was passed, allowing irrigation projects to be built in Montana's eastern river valleys. In 1909, Congress passed the Enlarged Homestead Act that expanded the amount of free land from 160 to 320 acres (0.6 to 1.3 km^{2}) per family and in 1912 reduced the time to "prove up" on a claim to three years. In 1916, the Stock-Raising Homestead Act allowed homesteads of 640 acres in areas unsuitable for irrigation. This combination of advertising and changes in the Homestead Act drew tens of thousands of homesteaders, lured by free land, with World War I bringing particularly high wheat prices. In addition, Montana was going through a temporary period of higher-than-average precipitation. Homesteaders arriving in this period were known as "honyockers", or "scissorbills". The word honyocker possibly derived from the ethnic slur hunyak and was applied in a derisive manner at homesteaders, who were perceived as being "greenhorns", "new at his business", or "unprepared". However, most of these new settlers had farming experience, though many did not.

Honyocker, scissorbill, nester ... He was the Joad of a [half] century ago, swarming into a hostile land: duped when he started, robbed when he arrived; hopeful, courageous, ambitious: he sought independence or adventure, comfort and security ... The honyocker was farmer, spinster, deep-sea diver; fiddler, physician, bartender, cook. He lived in Minnesota or Wisconsin, Massachusetts or Maine. There the news sought him out—Jim Hill's news of free land in the Treasure State ...

— Joseph Kinsey Howard, Montana, High, Wide, and Handsome (1964)

However, farmers faced a number of problems. Massive debt was one. Also, most settlers were from wetter regions, unprepared for the dry climate, lack of trees, and scarce water resources. In addition, small homesteads of fewer than 320 acres (130 ha) were unsuited to the environment. Weather and agricultural conditions are much harsher and drier west of the 100th meridian. Then, the droughts of 1917–1921 proved devastating. Many people left, and half the banks in the state went bankrupt as a result of providing mortgages that could not be repaid. As a result, farm sizes increased while the number of farms decreased.

By 1910, homesteaders filed claims on over five million acres, and by 1923, over 93 million acres were farmed. In 1910, the Great Falls land office alone had more than a thousand homestead filings per month, and at the peak of 1917–1918 it had 14,000 new homesteads each year. Significant drops occurred following the drought in 1919.

=== Montana and World War I ===
As World War I broke out, Jeannette Rankin, representative of Montana and the first woman in the United States to be a member of Congress, voted against the United States' declaration of war. Her actions were widely criticized in Montana, where support for the war and patriotism was strong. In 1917–1918, due to a miscalculation of Montana's population, about 40,000 Montanans, 10% of the state's population, volunteered or were drafted into the armed forces. This represented a manpower contribution to the war that was 25% higher than any other state on a per capita basis. Around 1,500 Montanans died as a result of the war and 2,437 were wounded, also higher than any other state on a per capita basis. Montana's Remount station in Miles City provided 10,000 cavalry horses for the war, more than any other Army post in the country. The war created a boom for Montana mining, lumber, and farming interests, as demand for war materials and food increased.

In June 1917, the U.S. Congress passed the Espionage Act of 1917, which was extended by the Sedition Act of 1918. In February 1918, the Montana legislature had passed the Montana Sedition Act, which was a model for the federal version. In combination, these laws criminalized criticism of the U.S. government, military, or symbols through speech or other means. The Montana Act led to the arrest of more than 200 individuals and the conviction of 78, mostly of German or Austrian descent. More than 40 spent time in prison. In May 2006, then-Governor Brian Schweitzer posthumously issued full pardons for all those convicted of violating the Montana Sedition Act.

The Montanans who opposed U.S. entry into the war included immigrant groups of German and Irish heritage, as well as pacifist Anabaptist people such as the Hutterites and Mennonites, many of whom were also of Germanic heritage. In turn, pro-War groups formed, such as the Montana Council of Defense, created by Governor Samuel V. Stewart and local "loyalty committees".

War sentiment was complicated by labor issues. The Anaconda Copper Company, which was at its historic peak of copper production, was an extremely powerful force in Montana, but it also faced criticism and opposition from socialist newspapers and unions struggling to make gains for their members. In Butte, a multiethnic community with a significant European immigrant population, labor unions, particularly the newly formed Metal Mine Workers' Union, opposed the war on grounds it mostly profited large lumber and mining interests. In the wake of ramped-up mine production and the Speculator Mine disaster in June 1917, Industrial Workers of the World organizer Frank Little arrived in Butte to organize miners. He gave some speeches with inflammatory antiwar rhetoric. On August 1, 1917, he was dragged from his boarding house by masked vigilantes, and hanged from a railroad trestle, considered a lynching. Little's murder and the strikes that followed resulted in the National Guard being sent to Butte to restore order. Overall, anti-German and antilabor sentiment increased and created a movement that led to the passage of the Montana Sedition Act the following February. In addition, the Council of Defense was made a state agency with the power to prosecute and punish individuals deemed in violation of the Act. The council also passed rules limiting public gatherings and prohibiting the speaking of German in public.

In the wake of the legislative action in 1918, emotions rose. U.S. Attorney Burton K. Wheeler and several district court judges who hesitated to prosecute or convict people brought up on charges were strongly criticized. Wheeler was brought before the Council of Defense, though he avoided formal proceedings, and a district court judge from Forsyth was impeached. Burnings of German-language books and several near-hangings occurred. The prohibition on speaking German remained in effect into the early 1920s. Complicating the wartime struggles, the 1918 influenza epidemic claimed the lives of more than 5,000 Montanans. The suppression of civil liberties that occurred led some historians to dub this period "Montana's Agony".

=== Depression era ===
An economic depression began in Montana after World War I and lasted through the Great Depression until the beginning of World War II. In 1917, a decade-long drought began, straining farms in the state. After the war, the national military stopped buying food, causing food prices and, thus, farmers' incomes to fall dramatically. This caused great hardship for farmers, ranchers, and miners.

=== Montana and World War II ===
By the time the U.S. entered World War II on December 8, 1941, many Montanans had enlisted in the military to escape the poor national economy of the previous decade. Another 40,000-plus Montanans entered the armed forces in the first year following the declaration of war, and more than 57,000 joined up before the war ended. These numbers constituted about ten percent of the state's population, and Montana again contributed one of the highest numbers of soldiers per capita of any state. Many Native Americans were among those who served, including soldiers from the Crow Nation who became Code Talkers. At least 1,500 Montanans died in the war. Montana also was the training ground for the First Special Service Force or "Devil's Brigade", a joint U.S.-Canadian commando-style force that trained at Fort William Henry Harrison for experience in mountainous and winter conditions before deployment. Air bases were built in Great Falls, Lewistown, Cut Bank, and Glasgow, some of which were used as staging areas to prepare planes to be sent to allied forces in the Soviet Union. During the war, about 30 Japanese Fu-Go balloon bombs were documented to have landed in Montana, though no casualties nor major forest fires were attributed to them.

In 1940, Jeannette Rankin was again elected to Congress. In 1941, as she had in 1917, she voted against the United States' declaration of war after the Japanese attack on Pearl Harbor. Hers was the only vote against the war, and in the wake of public outcry over her vote, Rankin required police protection for a time. Other pacifists tended to be those from "peace churches" who generally opposed war. Many individuals claiming conscientious objector status from throughout the U.S. were sent to Montana during the war as smokejumpers and for other forest fire-fighting duties.

In 1942, the U.S. Army established Camp Rimini near Helena for the purpose of training sled dogs in winter weather.

=== Other military ===
During World War II, the planned battleship USS Montana was named in honor of the state but it was never completed. Montana is the only one of the first 48 states lacking a completed battleship being named for it. Alaska and Hawaii have both had nuclear submarines named after them. Montana is the only state in the union without a modern naval ship named in its honor. However, in August 2007, Senator Jon Tester asked that a submarine be christened USS Montana. Secretary of the Navy Ray Mabus announced on September 3, 2015, that Virginia Class attack submarine SSN-794 will become the second commissioned warship to bear the name. The submarine was commissioned on June 25, 2022. It was stationed at Joint Base Pearl Harbor-Hickam in December 2024.

=== Cold War Montana ===
In the post-World War II Cold War era, Montana became host to U.S. Air Force Military Air Transport Service (1947) for airlift training in C-54 Skymasters and eventually, in 1953 Strategic Air Command air and missile forces were based at Malmstrom Air Force Base in Great Falls. The base also hosted the 29th Fighter Interceptor Squadron, Air Defense Command from 1953 to 1968. In December 1959, Malmstrom AFB was selected as the home of the new Minuteman I intercontinental ballistic missile. The first operational missiles were in place and ready in early 1962. In late 1962, missiles assigned to the 341st Strategic Missile Wing played a major role in the Cuban Missile Crisis. When the Soviets removed their missiles from Cuba, President John F. Kennedy said the Soviets backed down because they knew he had an "ace in the hole", referring directly to the Minuteman missiles in Montana. Montana eventually became home to the largest ICBM field in the U.S. covering 23,500 square miles (61,000 km^{2}).

== Geography ==
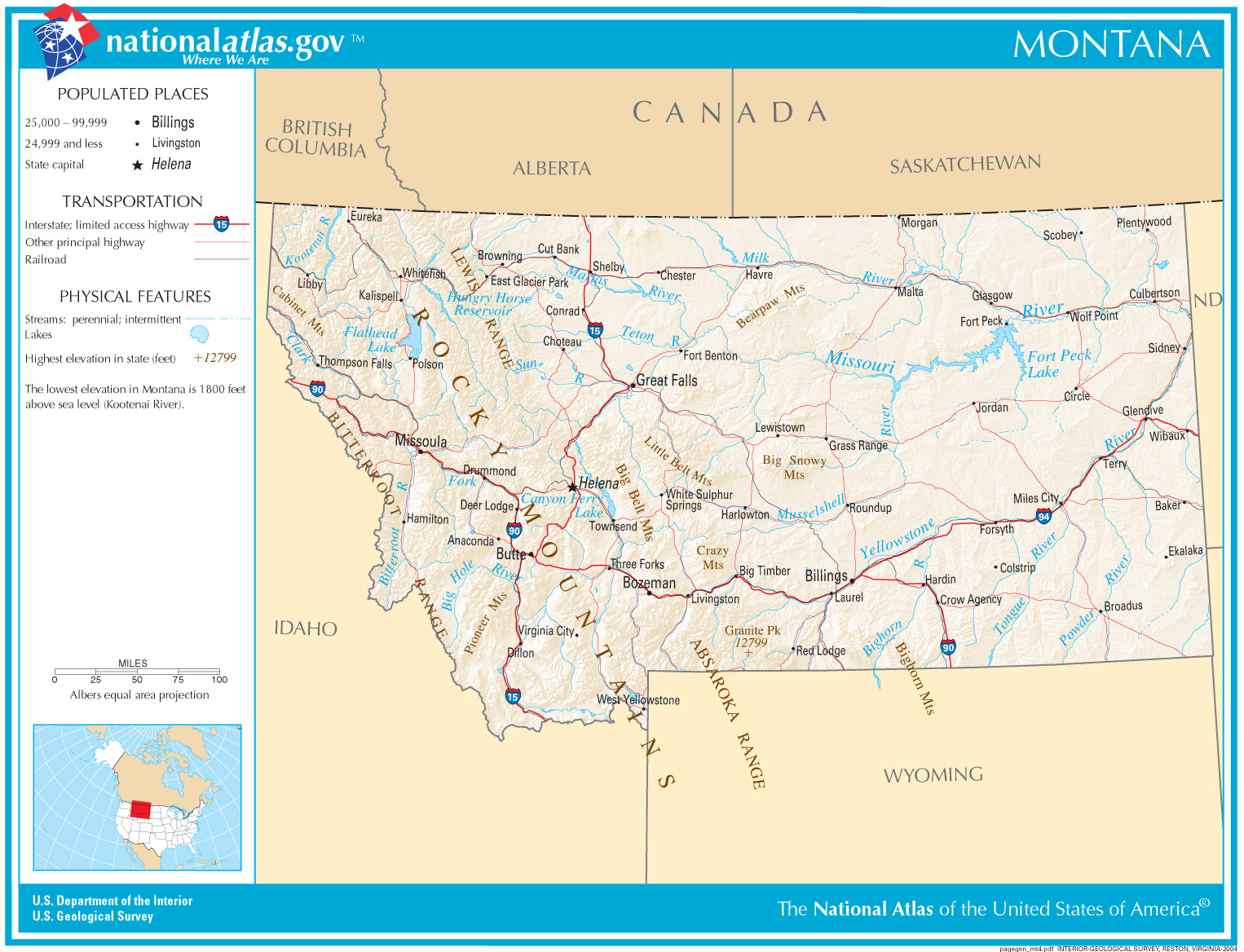
Map of Montana

Montana is one of the eight Mountain States, located in the north of the Western United States region. It borders North Dakota and South Dakota to the east. Wyoming is to the south, Idaho is to the west and southwest, and the Canadian provinces of British Columbia, Alberta, and Saskatchewan are to the north, making it the only state to border three Canadian provinces.

With an area of 147,040 square miles (380,800 km^{2}), Montana is slightly larger than Japan or Germany. It is the fourth-largest state in the United States after Alaska, Texas, and California, and is the largest landlocked state.

=== Topography ===
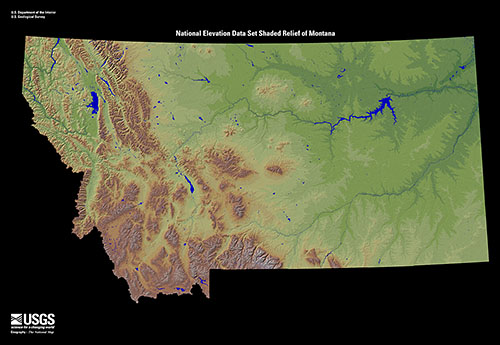
Relief map of Montana

The state's topography is roughly defined by the Continental Divide, which splits much of the state into distinct eastern and western regions. Most of Montana's hundred or more named mountain ranges are in the state's western half, most of which is geologically and geographically part of the northern Rocky Mountains. The Absaroka and Beartooth ranges in the state's south-central part are technically part of the Central Rocky Mountains. The Rocky Mountain Front is a significant feature in the state's north-central portion, and isolated island ranges that interrupt the prairie landscape common in the central and eastern parts of the state. About 60 percent of the state is prairie, part of the northern Great Plains.

The Bitterroot Mountains—one of the longest continuous ranges in the Rocky Mountain chain from Alaska to Mexico—along with smaller ranges, including the Coeur d'Alene Mountains and the Cabinet Mountains, divide the state from Idaho. The southern third of the Bitterroot range blends into the Continental Divide. Other major mountain ranges west of the divide include the Cabinet Mountains, the Anaconda Range, the Missions, the Garnet Range, the Sapphire Mountains, and the Flint Creek Range.

The divide's northern section, where the mountains rapidly give way to prairie, is part of the Rocky Mountain Front. The front is most pronounced in the Lewis Range, located primarily in Glacier National Park. Due to the configuration of mountain ranges in Glacier National Park, the Northern Divide (which begins in Alaska's Seward Peninsula) crosses this region and turns east in Montana at Triple Divide Peak. It causes the Waterton River, Belly, and Saint Mary rivers to flow north into Alberta, Canada. There they join the Saskatchewan River, which ultimately empties into Hudson Bay.

East of the divide, several roughly parallel ranges cover the state's southern part, including the Gravelly Range, Madison Range, Gallatin Range, Absaroka Range, and the Beartooth Mountains, which contain the state's highest point, Granite Peak, 12,799 feet (3,901 m) high. North of these ranges are the Big Belt Mountains, Bridger Mountains, Tobacco Roots, and several island ranges, including the Crazy Mountains and Little Belt Mountains.

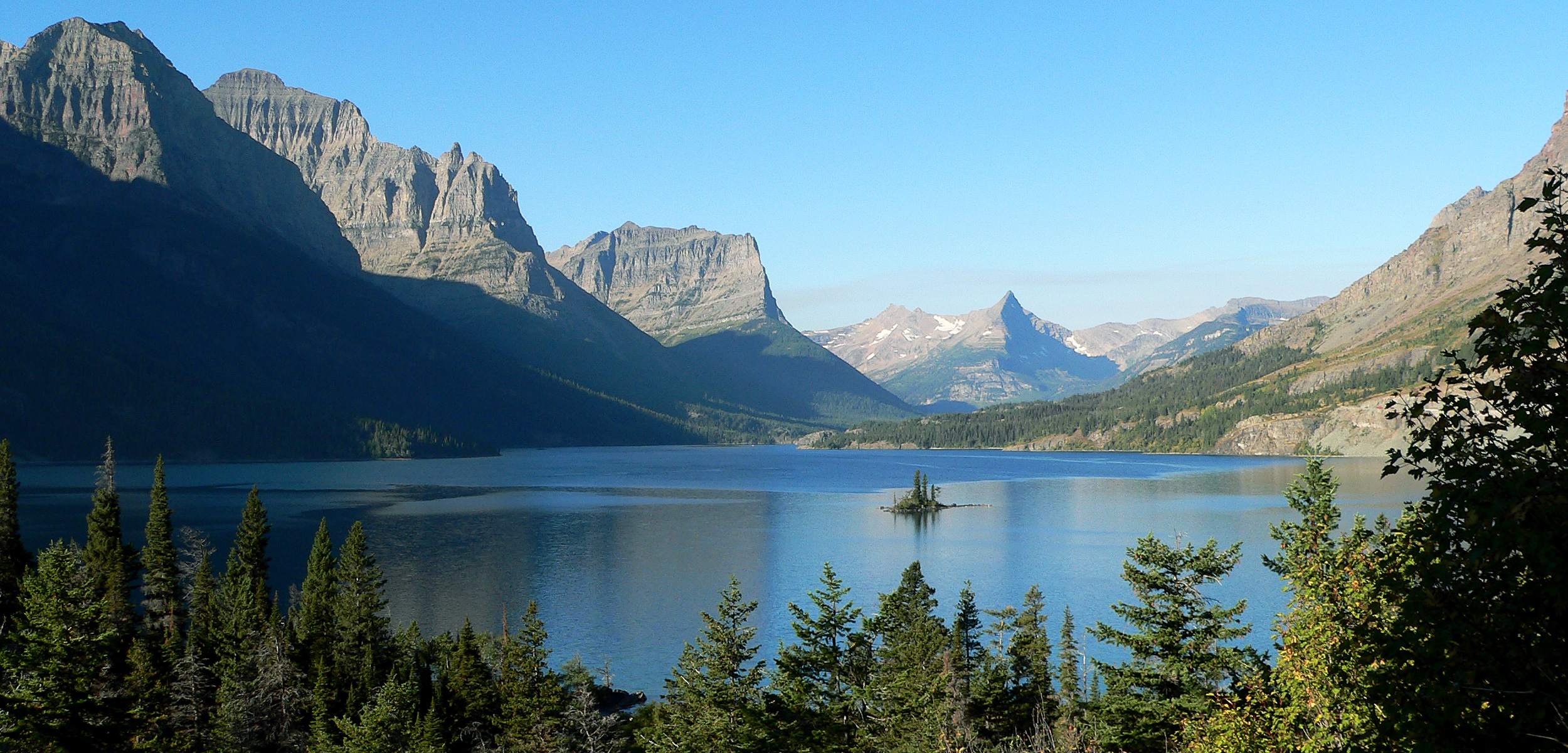
Saint Mary Lake in Glacier National Park

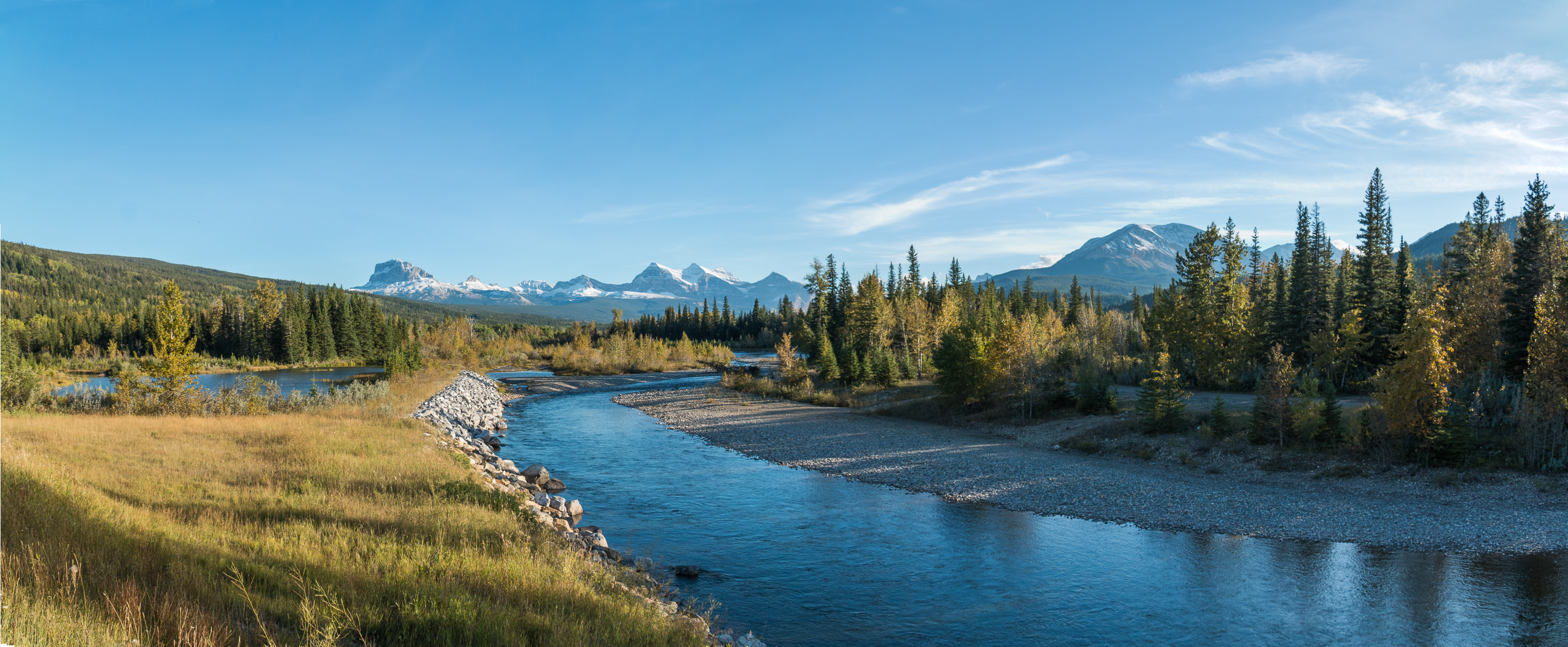
Belly River in Waterton Lakes National Park

Between many mountain ranges are several rich river valleys. The Big Hole, Bitterroot, Gallatin, Flathead, and Paradise Valleys have extensive agricultural resources and multiple opportunities for tourism and recreation.

East and north of this transition zone are the expansive and sparsely populated Northern Plains, with tableland prairies, smaller island mountain ranges, and badlands. The isolated island ranges east of the Divide include the Bear Paw Mountains, Bull Mountains, Castle Mountains, Crazy Mountains, Highwood Mountains, Judith Mountains, Little Belt Mountains, Little Rocky Mountains, the Pryor Mountains, Little Snowy Mountains, Big Snowy Mountains, Sweet Grass Hills, and—in the state's southeastern corner near Ekalaka—the Long Pines. Many of these isolated eastern ranges were created about 120 to 66 million years ago when magma welling up from the interior cracked and bowed the earth's surface here.

The area east of the divide in the state's north-central portion is known for the Missouri Breaks and other significant rock formations. Three buttes south of Great Falls are major landmarks: Cascade, Crown, Square, Shaw, and Buttes. Known as laccoliths, they formed when igneous rock protruded through cracks in the sedimentary rock. The underlying surface consists of sandstone and shale. Surface soils in the area are highly diverse, and greatly affected by the local geology, whether glaciated plain, intermountain basin, mountain foothills, or tableland. Foothill regions are often covered in weathered stone or broken slate, or consist of uncovered bare rock (usually igneous, quartzite, sandstone, or shale). The soil of intermountain basins usually consists of clay, gravel, sand, silt, and volcanic ash, much of it laid down by lakes which covered the region during the Oligocene 33 to 23 million years ago. Tablelands are often topped with argillite gravel and weathered quartzite, occasionally underlain by shale. The glaciated plains are generally covered in clay, gravel, sand, and silt left by the proglacial Lake Great Falls or by moraines or gravel-covered former lake basins left by the Wisconsin glaciation 85,000 to 11,000 years ago. Farther east, areas such as Makoshika State Park near Glendive and Medicine Rocks State Park near Ekalaka contain some of the most scenic badlands regions in the state.

The Hell Creek Formation in Northeast Montana is a major source of dinosaur fossils. Paleontologist Jack Horner of the Museum of the Rockies in Bozeman brought this formation to the world's attention with several major finds.

==== Rivers, lakes and reservoirs ====
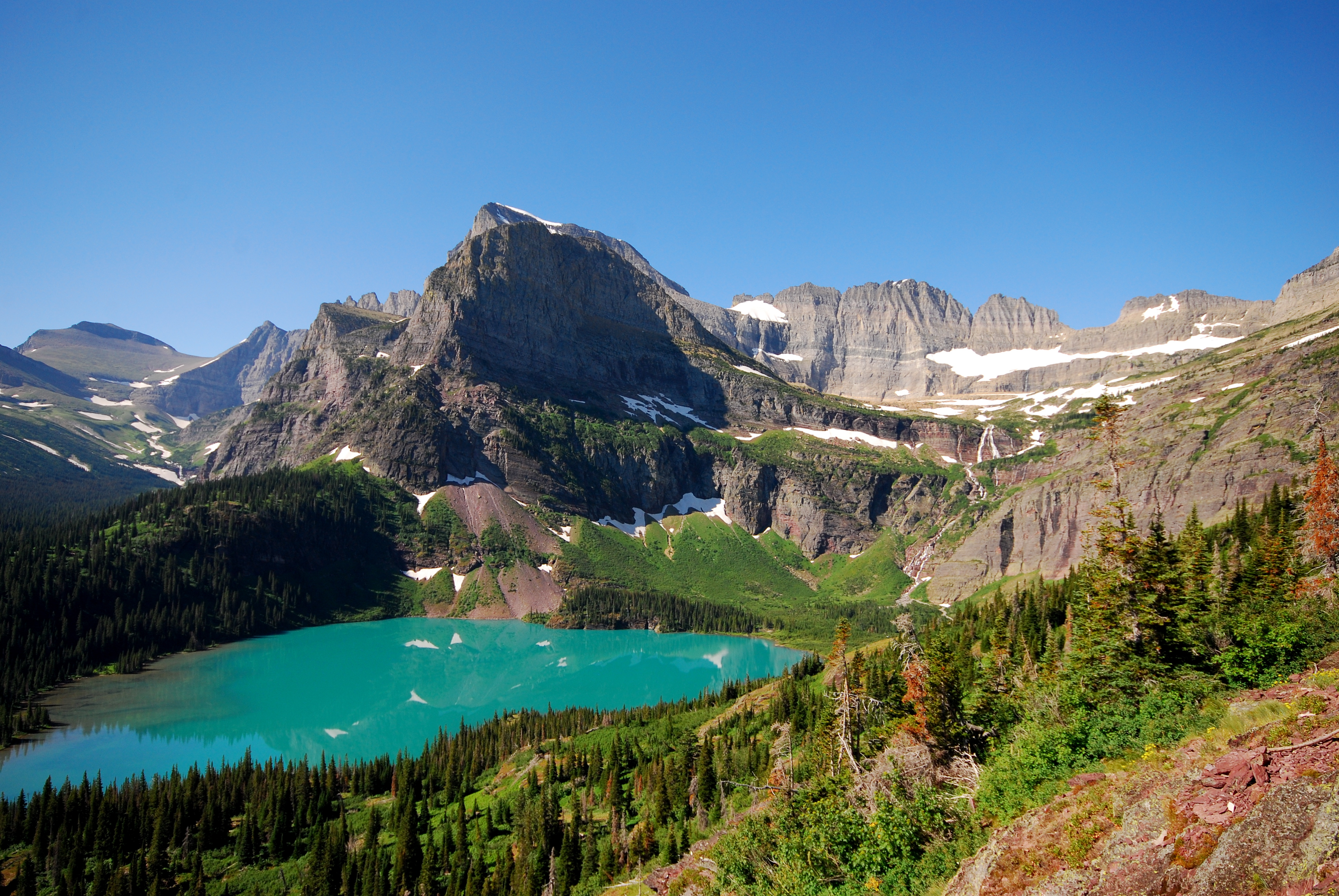
East face of Mount Gould above Grinnell Lake

Montana has thousands of named rivers and creeks, 450 miles (720 km) of which are known for "blue-ribbon" trout fishing. Montana's water resources provide for recreation, hydropower, crop and forage irrigation, mining, and water for human consumption.

Montana is one of few geographic areas in the world whose rivers form parts of three major watersheds (i.e. where two continental divides intersect). Its rivers feed the Pacific Ocean, the Gulf of Mexico, and Hudson Bay. The watersheds divide at Triple Divide Peak in Glacier National Park. If Hudson Bay is considered part of the Arctic Ocean, Triple Divide Peak is the only place on Earth with drainage to three different oceans.

===== Pacific Ocean drainage basin =====
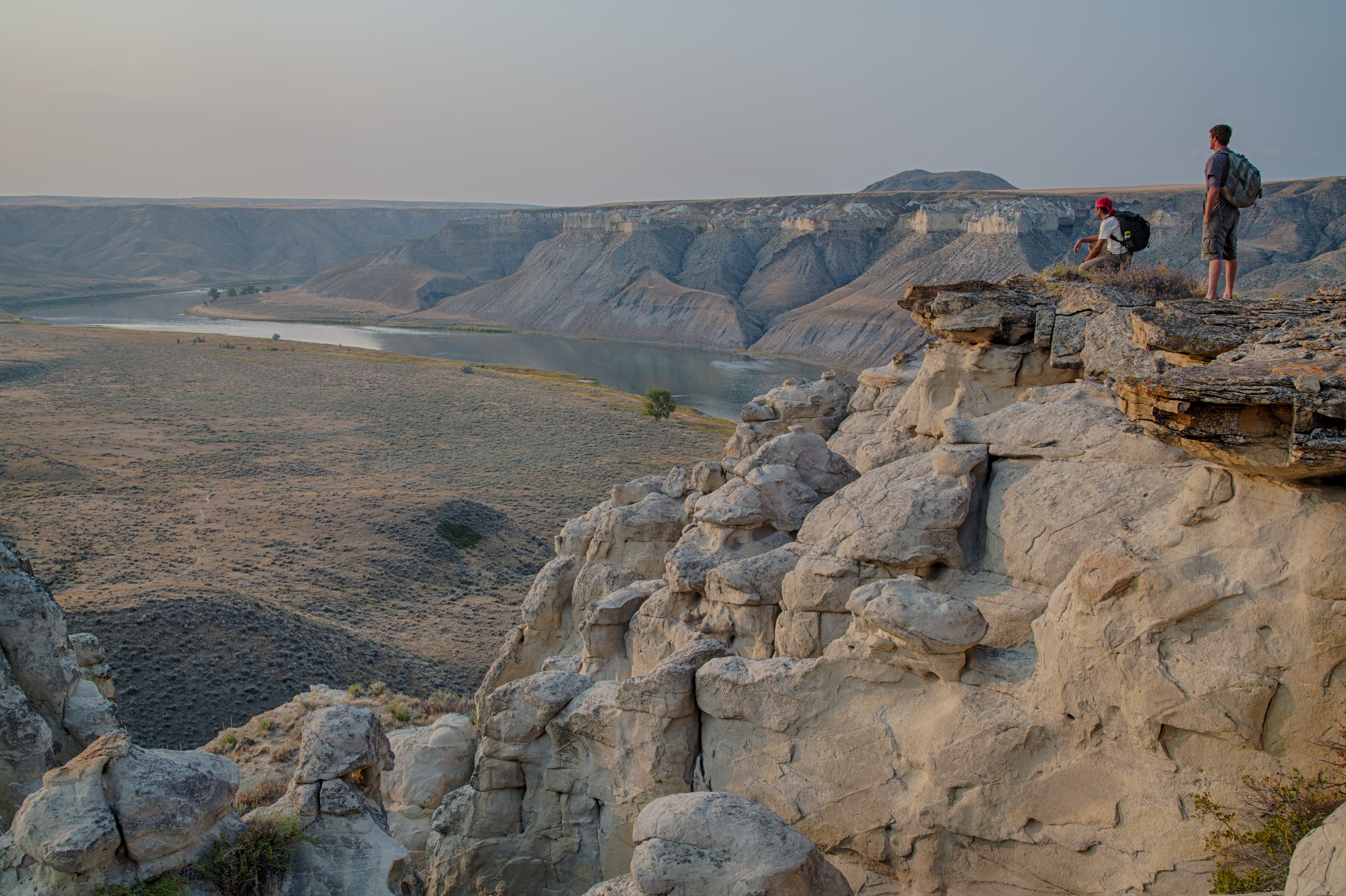
Missouri Breaks region in central Montana

All waters in Montana west of the divide flow into the Columbia River. The Clark Fork of the Columbia (not to be confused with the Clarks Fork of the Yellowstone River) rises near Butte and flows northwest to Missoula, where it is joined by the Blackfoot River and Bitterroot River. Farther downstream, it is joined by the Flathead River before entering Idaho near Lake Pend Oreille. The Pend Oreille River forms the outflow of Lake Pend Oreille. The Pend Oreille River joined the Columbia River, which flows to the Pacific Ocean—making the 579-mile (932 km) long Clark Fork/Pend Oreille (considered a single river system) the longest river in the Rocky Mountains. The Clark Fork discharges the greatest volume of water of any river exiting the state. The Kootenai River in northwest Montana is another major tributary of the Columbia.

===== Gulf of Mexico drainage basin =====
East of the divide the Missouri River, which is formed by the confluence of the Jefferson, Madison, and Gallatin Rivers near Three Forks, flows due north through the west-central part of the state to Great Falls. From this point, it then flows generally east through fairly flat agricultural land and the Missouri Breaks to Fort Peck reservoir. The stretch of river between Fort Benton and the Fred Robinson Bridge at the western boundary of Fort Peck Reservoir was designated a National Wild and Scenic River in 1976. The Missouri enters North Dakota near Fort Union, having drained more than half the land area of Montana (82,000 square miles (210,000 km^{2})). Nearly one-third of the Missouri River in Montana lies behind 10 dams: Toston, Canyon Ferry, Hauser, Holter, Black Eagle, Rainbow, Cochrane, Ryan, Morony, and Fort Peck. Other major Montana tributaries of the Missouri include the Smith, Milk, Marias, Judith, and Musselshell Rivers. Montana also claims the disputed title of possessing the world's shortest river, the Roe River, just outside Great Falls. Through the Missouri, these rivers ultimately join the Mississippi River and flow into the Gulf of Mexico.

Hell Roaring Creek begins in southern Montana, and when combined with the Red Rock, Beaverhead, Jefferson, Missouri, and Mississippi River, is the longest river in North America and the fourth longest river in the world.

The Yellowstone River rises on the Continental Divide near Younts Peak in Wyoming's Teton Wilderness. It flows north through Yellowstone National Park, enters Montana near Gardiner, and passes through the Paradise Valley to Livingston. It then flows northeasterly across the state through Billings, Miles City, Glendive, and Sidney. The Yellowstone joins the Missouri in North Dakota just east of Fort Union. It is the longest undammed, free-flowing river in the contiguous United States, and drains about a quarter of Montana (36,000 square miles (93,000 km^{2})). Major tributaries of the Yellowstone include the Boulder, Stillwater, Clarks Fork, Bighorn, Tongue, and Powder Rivers.

===== Hudson Bay drainage basin =====
The Northern Divide turns east in Montana at Triple Divide Peak, causing the Waterton, Belly, and Saint Mary Rivers to flow north into Alberta. There they join the Saskatchewan River, which ultimately empties into Hudson Bay.

===== Lakes and reservoirs =====
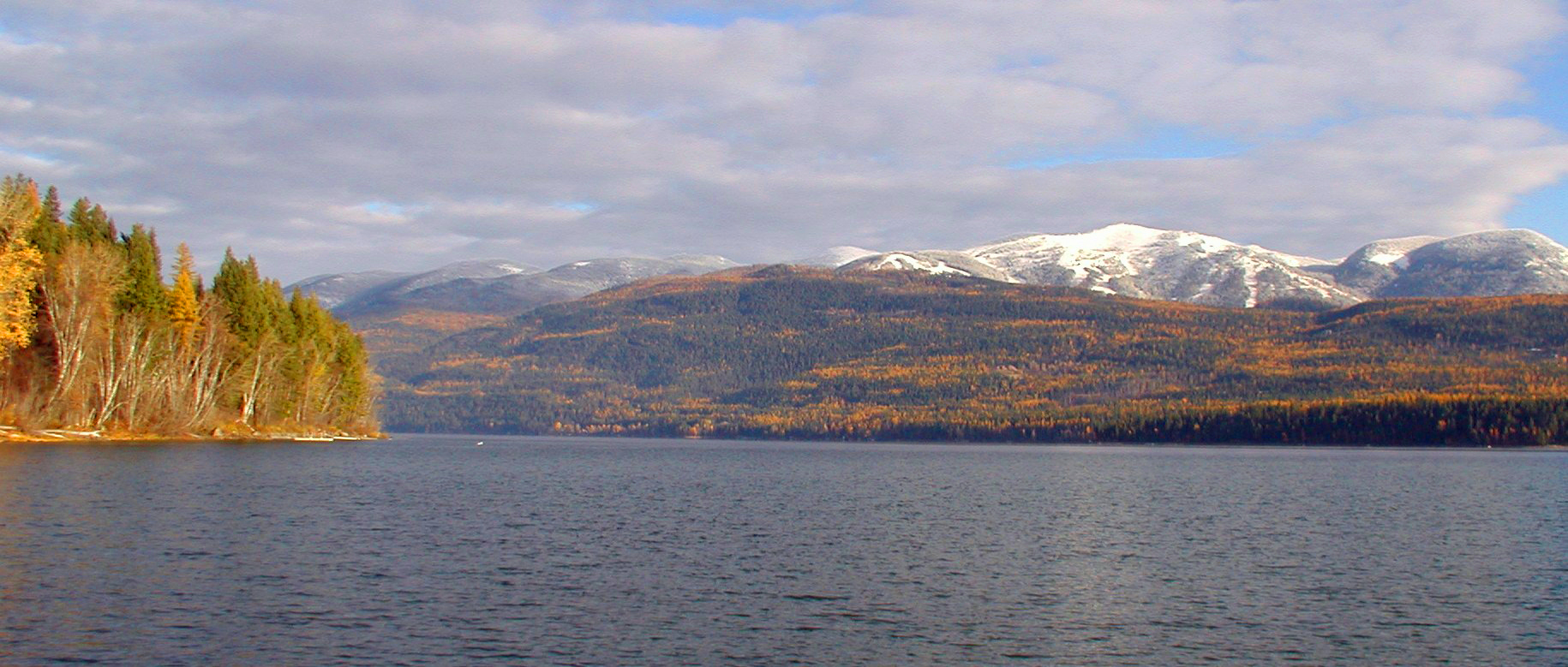
Whitefish Lake in Montana

Montana has some 3,000 named lakes and reservoirs, including Flathead Lake, the largest natural freshwater lake in the western United States. Other major lakes include Whitefish Lake in the Flathead Valley and Lake McDonald and St. Mary Lake in Glacier National Park. The largest reservoir in the state is Fort Peck Reservoir on the Missouri river, which is contained by the second-largest earthen dam and largest hydraulically filled dam in the world. Other major reservoirs include Hungry Horse on the Flathead River; Lake Koocanusa on the Kootenai River; Lake Elwell on the Marias River; Clark Canyon on the Beaverhead River; Yellowtail on the Bighorn River, Canyon Ferry, Hauser, Holter, Rainbow; and Black Eagle on the Missouri River.

=== Flora and fauna ===
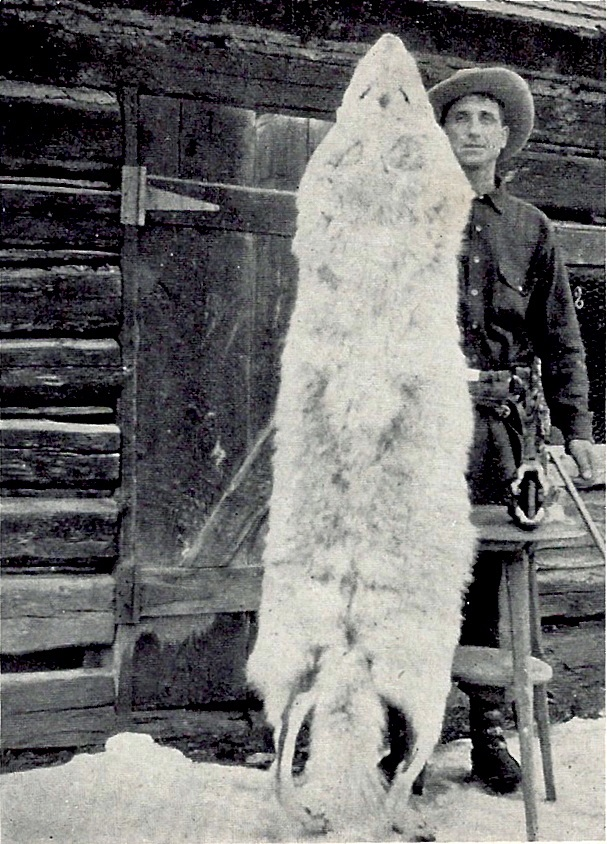
100 pound native Montana wolf taken in 1928

Vegetation of the state includes lodgepole pine, ponderosa pine, Douglas fir, larch, spruce, aspen, birch, red cedar, hemlock, ash, alder, rocky mountain maple and cottonwood trees. Forests cover about 25% of the state. Flowers native to Montana include asters, bitterroots, daisies, lupins, poppies, primroses, columbine, lilies, orchids, and dryads. Several species of sagebrush and cactus and many species of grasses are common. Many species of mushrooms and lichens are also found in the state.

Montana is home to diverse fauna including 14 amphibian, 90 fish, 117 mammal, 20 reptile, and 427 bird species. Additionally, more than 10,000 invertebrate species are present, including 180 mollusks and 30 crustaceans. Montana has the largest grizzly bear population in the lower 48 states. Montana hosts five federally endangered species–black-footed ferret, whooping crane, least tern, pallid sturgeon, and white sturgeon and seven threatened species including the grizzly bear, Canadian lynx, and bull trout. (Note: However, the grizzly bear and Canadian lynx are listed as a threatened species only for the mainland 48 states. In general, the grizzly bear and Canadian lynx are not threatened species; the IUCN lists both as "least concern".) Since re-introduction the gray wolf population has stabilized at about 900 animals, and they have been delisted as endangered. The Montana Department of Fish, Wildlife and Parks manages fishing and hunting seasons for at least 17 species of game fish, including seven species of trout, walleye, and smallmouth bass and at least 29 species of game birds and animals including ring-neck pheasant, grey partridge, elk, pronghorn antelope, mule deer, whitetail deer, gray wolf, American bison and bighorn sheep.

=== Protected lands ===
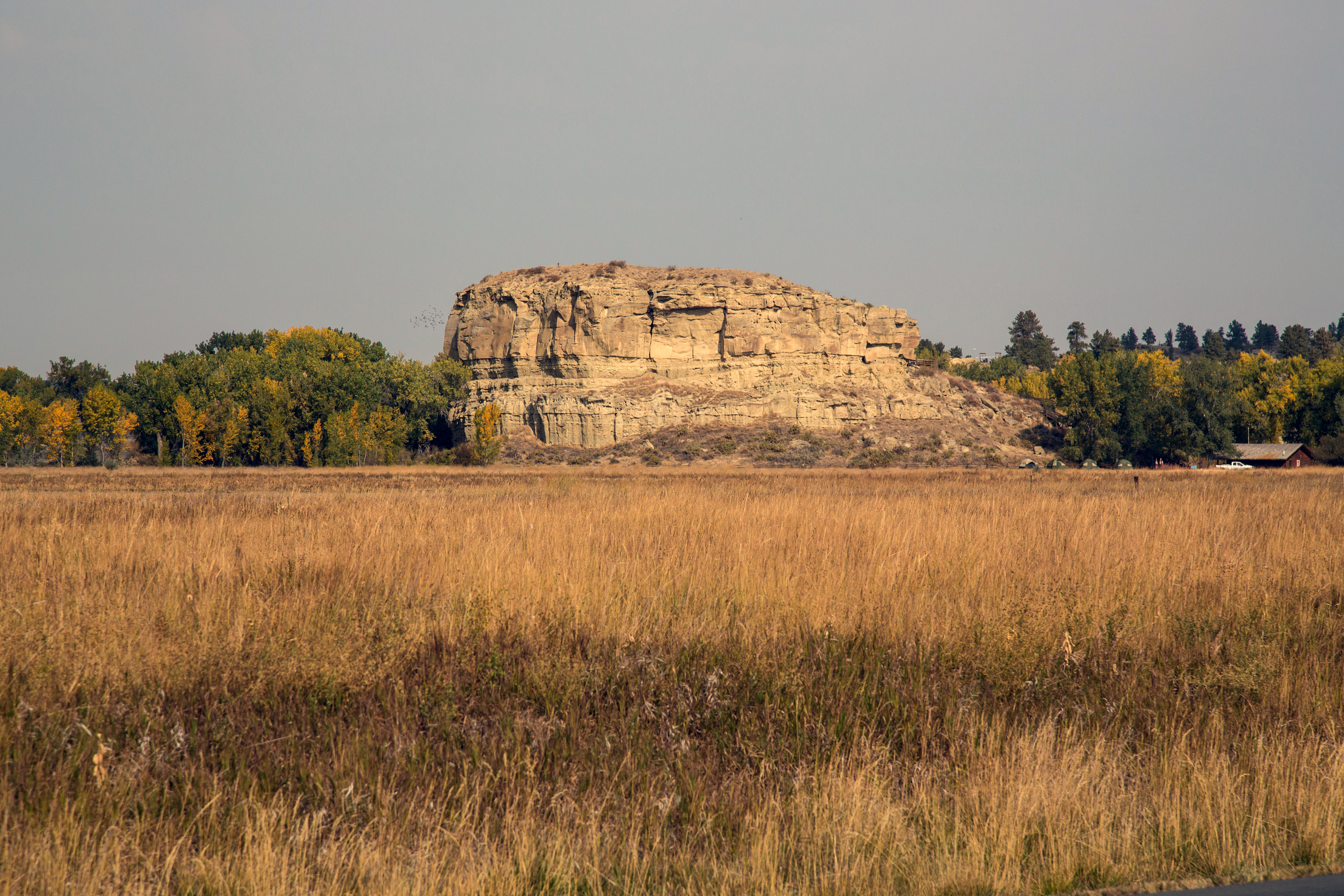
Pompeys Pillar National Monument

Montana contains Glacier National Park, "The Crown of the Continent", and parts of Yellowstone National Park, including three of the park's five entrances. Other federally recognized sites include the Little Bighorn National Monument, Bighorn Canyon National Recreation Area, and Big Hole National Battlefield. The CSKT Bison Range is managed by the Confederated Salish and Kootenai Tribes and the American Prairie is owned and operated by a nonprofit organization.

Federal and state agencies administer approximately 31,300,000 acres (127,000 km^{2}), or 35 percent of Montana's land. The U.S. Department of Agriculture Forest Service administers 16,800,000 acres (68,000 km^{2}) of forest land in ten National Forests. There are approximately 3,300,000 acres (13,000 km^{2}) of wilderness in 12 separate wilderness areas that are part of the National Wilderness Preservation System established by the Wilderness Act of 1964. The U.S. Department of the Interior Bureau of Land Management controls 8,100,000 acres (33,000 km^{2}) of federal land. The U.S. Department of the Interior Fish and Wildlife Service administers 110,000 acres (450 km^{2}) of 1.1 million acres of National Wildlife Refuges and waterfowl production areas in Montana. The U.S. Department of the Interior Bureau of Reclamation administers approximately 300,000 acres (1,200 km^{2}) of land and water surface in the state. The Montana Department of Fish, Wildlife and Parks operate approximately 275,265 acres (1,113.96 km^{2}) of state parks and access points on the state's rivers and lakes. The Montana Department of Natural Resources and Conservation manages 5,200,000 acres (21,000 km^{2}) of School Trust Land ceded by the federal government under the Land Ordinance of 1785 to the state in 1889 when Montana was granted statehood. These lands are managed by the state for the benefit of public schools and institutions in the state.

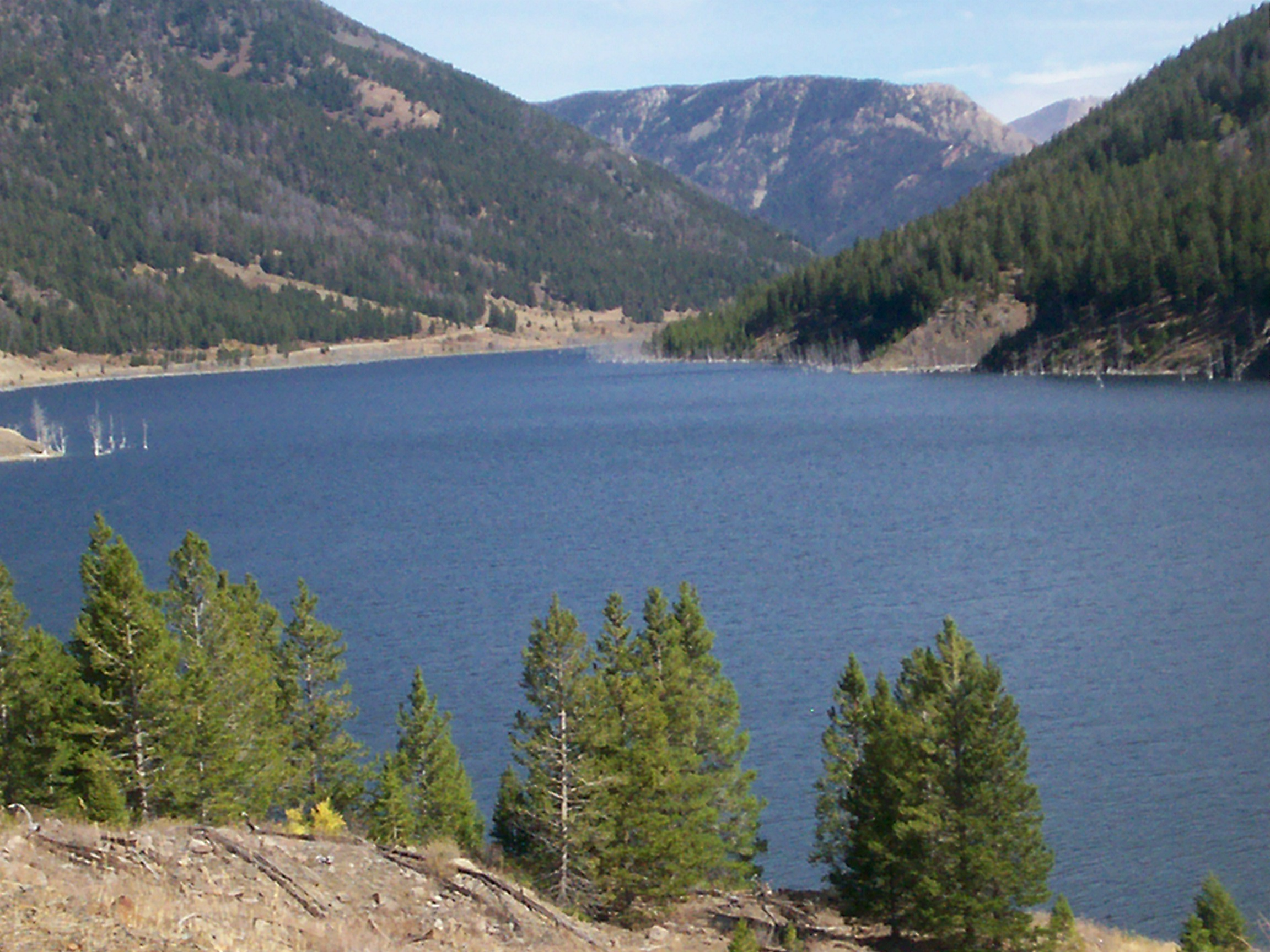
Quake Lake was created by a landslide during the 1959 Hebgen Lake earthquake.

Areas managed by the National Park Service include:

- Big Hole National Battlefield near Wisdom
- Bighorn Canyon National Recreation Area near Fort Smith
- Glacier National Park
- Grant-Kohrs Ranch National Historic Site at Deer Lodge
- Lewis and Clark National Historic Trail
- Little Bighorn Battlefield National Monument near Crow Agency
- Nez Perce National Historical Park
- Yellowstone National Park

=== Climate ===
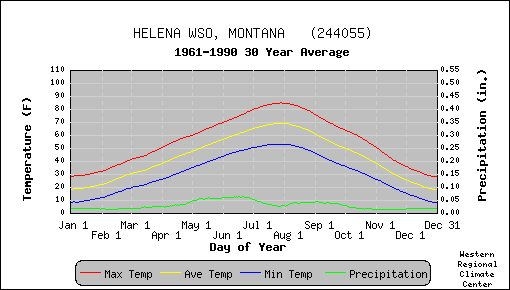
Temperature and precipitation for Montana's capital city, Helena

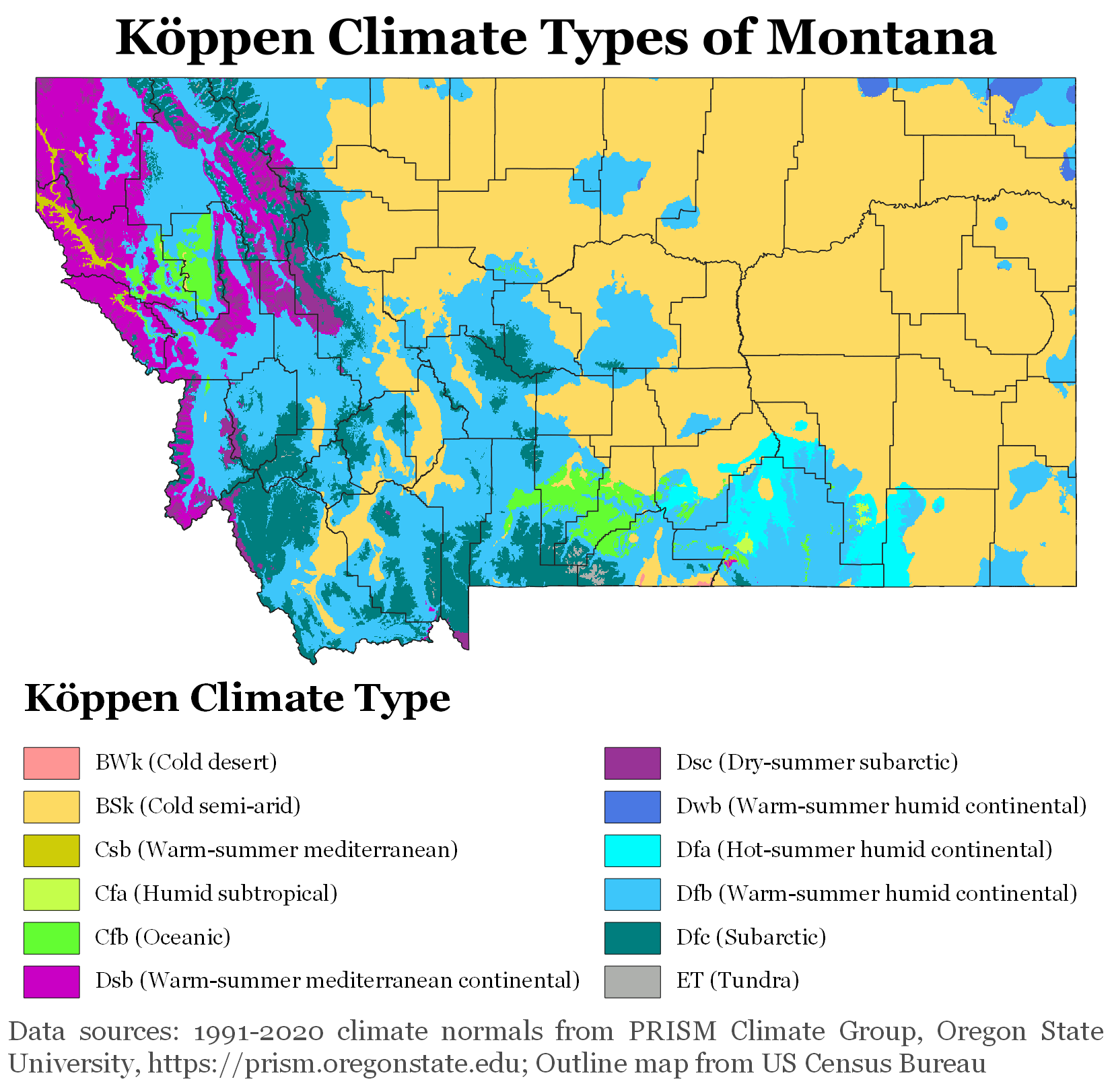
Köppen climate types of Montana, using 1991–2020 climate normals

Montana is a large state with considerable variation in geography, topography and elevation, and the climate is equally varied. The state spans from below the 45th parallel (the line equidistant between the equator and North Pole) to the 49th parallel, and elevations range from under 2,000 feet (610 m) to nearly 13,000 feet (4,000 m) above sea level. The western half is mountainous, interrupted by numerous large valleys. Eastern Montana comprises plains and badlands, broken by hills and isolated mountain ranges, and has a semi-arid, continental climate (Köppen climate classification BSk). The Continental Divide has a considerable effect on the climate, as it restricts the flow of warmer air from the Pacific from moving east, and drier continental air from moving west. The area west of the divide has a modified northern Pacific Coast climate, with milder winters, cooler summers, less wind, and a longer growing season. Low clouds and fog often form in the valleys west of the divide in winter, but this is rarely seen in the east.

Average daytime temperatures vary from 28 °F or −2.2 °C in January to 84.5 °F or 29.2 °C in July. The variation in geography leads to great variation in temperature. The highest observed summer temperature was 117 °F or 47.2 °C at Glendive on July 20, 1893, and Medicine Lake on July 5, 1937. Throughout the state, summer nights are generally cool and pleasant. Extreme hot weather is less common above 4,000 feet or 1,200 meters. Snowfall has been recorded in all months of the year in the more mountainous areas of central and western Montana, though it is rare in July and August.

The coldest temperature on record for Montana is also the coldest temperature for the contiguous United States. On January 20, 1954, −70 °F or −56.7 °C was recorded at a gold mining camp near Rogers Pass. Temperatures vary greatly on cold nights, and Helena, 40 miles (64 km) to the southeast had a low of only −36 °F or −37.8 °C on the same date, and an all-time record low of −42 °F or −41.1 °C. Winter cold spells are usually the result of cold continental air coming south from Canada. The front is often well defined, causing a large temperature drop in a 24-hour period. Conversely, air flow from the southwest results in "chinooks". These steady 25–50 mph (40–80 km/h) (or more) winds can suddenly warm parts of Montana, especially areas just to the east of the mountains, where temperatures sometimes rise up to 50–60 °F (10.0–15.6 °C) for 10 days or longer.

Loma is the site of the most extreme recorded temperature change in a 24-hour period in the United States. On January 15, 1972, a chinook wind blew in and the temperature rose from −54 to 49 °F (−47.8 to 9.4 °C); a 103 °F (57.2 °C) degree difference.

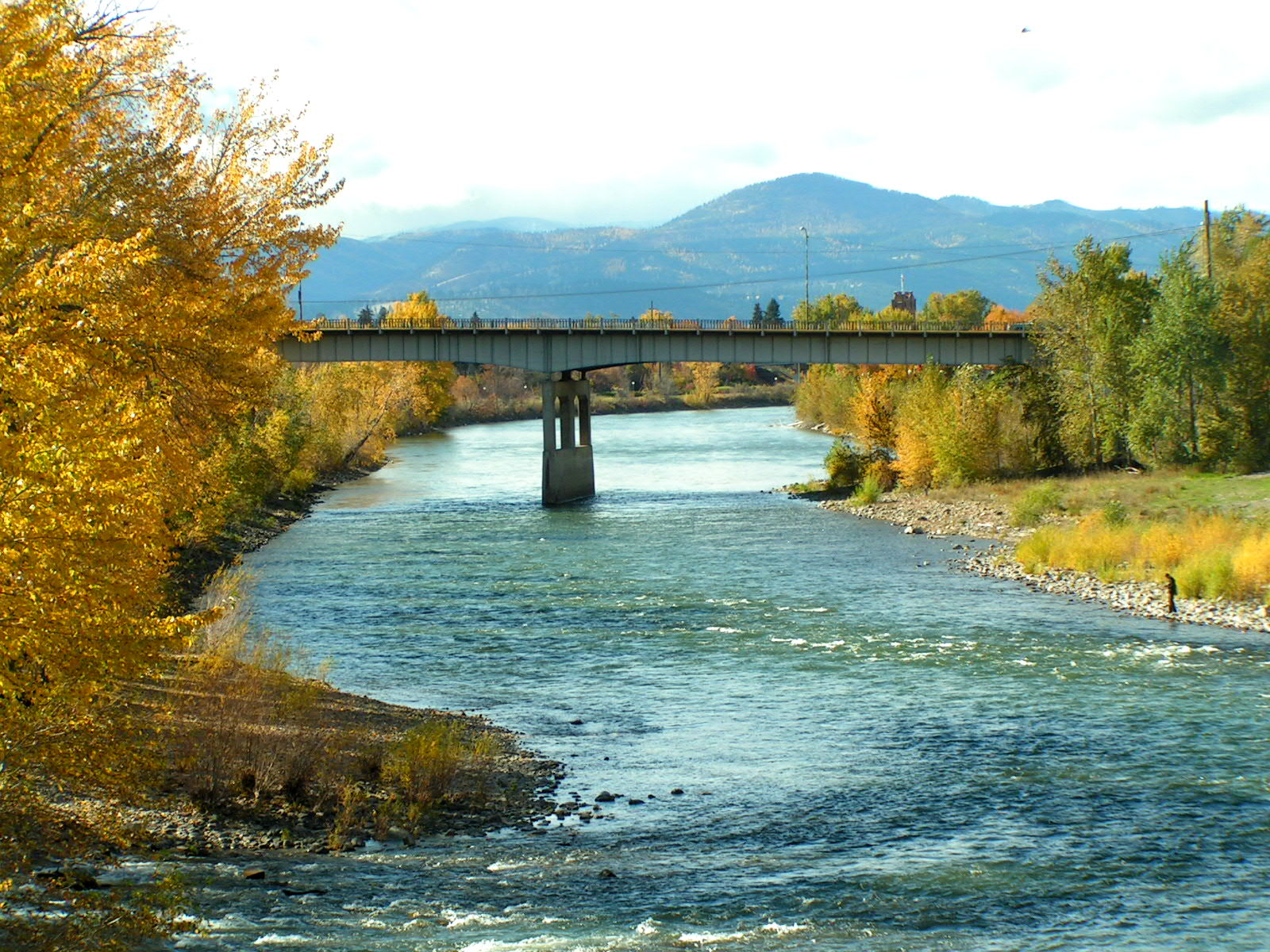
Clark Fork River, Missoula, in autumn

Average annual precipitation is 15 inches (380 mm), but great variations are seen. The mountain ranges block the moist Pacific air, holding moisture in the western valleys, and creating rain shadows to the east. Heron, in the west, receives the most precipitation, 34.70 inches (881 mm). On the eastern (leeward) side of a mountain range, the valleys are much drier; Lonepine averages 11.45 inches (291 mm), and Deer Lodge 11.00 inches (279 mm) of precipitation. The mountains can receive over 100 inches (2,500 mm), for example the Grinnell Glacier in Glacier National Park gets 105 inches (2,700 mm). An area southwest of Belfry averaged only 6.59 inches (167 mm) over a 16-year period. Most of the larger cities get 30 to 50 inches or 0.76 to 1.27 meters of snow each year. Mountain ranges can accumulate 300 inches or 7.62 meters of snow during a winter. Heavy snowstorms may occur from September through May, though most snow falls from November to March.

The climate has become warmer in Montana, with the average temperature rising almost 2.5 °F (1.3 °C) since 1900 at a rate higher than the continental U.S. average, and continues to do so. The glaciers in Glacier National Park have receded and are predicted to melt away completely in a few decades. Many Montana cities set heat records during July 2007, the hottest month ever recorded in Montana. Winters are warmer, too, and have fewer cold spells. Previously, these cold spells had killed off bark beetles, but these are now attacking the forests of western Montana. The warmer winters in the region have allowed various species to expand their ranges and proliferate. The combination of warmer weather, attack by beetles, and mismanagement has led to a substantial increase in the severity of forest fires in Montana. According to a study done for the U.S. Environmental Protection Agency by the Harvard School of Engineering and Applied Science, parts of Montana will experience a 200% increase in area burned by wildfires and an 80% increase in related air pollution.

The table below lists average temperatures for the warmest and coldest month for Montana's seven largest cities. The coldest month varies between December and January depending on location, although figures are similar throughout.

Average daily maximum and minimum temperatures for selected cities in Montana
Location	July (°F)	Coldest month (°F)	July (°C)	Coldest month (°C)
Billings	90/59	32/14	32/15	4/–9
Missoula	88/51	30/11	31/16	−0/–8
Great Falls	93/59	28/11	34/15	1/–9
Bozeman	81/51	27/10	31/12	−0/–11
Butte	86/41	27/7	30/5	−1/–15
Helena	88/54	30/12	31/12	−0/–11
Kalispell	84/57	27/9	29/14	−1/–10

=== Antipodes ===
Montana is one of only two contiguous states (along with Colorado) that are antipodal to land. The Kerguelen Islands are antipodal to the Montana–Saskatchewan–Alberta border. No towns are precisely antipodal to Kerguelen, though Chester and Rudyard are close.

=== Cities and towns ===
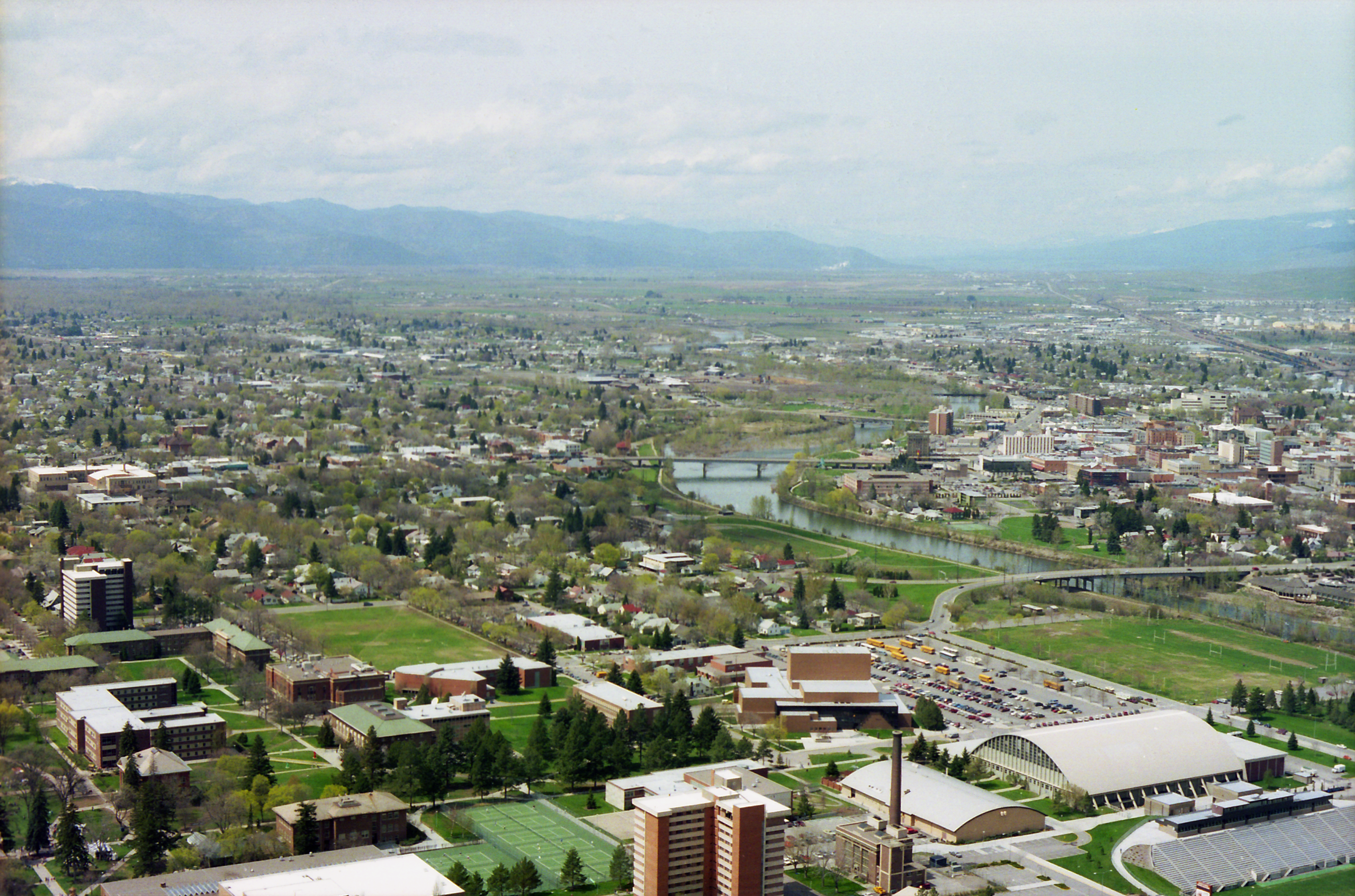
Missoula

Montana has 56 counties and a total of 364 "places" as defined by the United States Census Bureau; the latter comprising 129 incorporated places and 235 census-designated places. The incorporated places are made up of 52 cities, 75 towns, and two consolidated city-counties.

Montana has one city, Billings, with a population over 100,000; and three cities with populations over 50,000: Missoula, Great Falls and Bozeman. The state also has five Micropolitan Statistical Areas, centered on Bozeman, Butte, Helena, Kalispell and Havre.

Collectively all of these areas (excluding Havre) are known informally as the "big seven", as they are consistently the seven largest communities in the state (their rank order in terms of population is Billings, Missoula, Great Falls, Bozeman, Butte, Helena and Kalispell, according to the 2010 U.S. census). Based on 2013 census numbers, they contain 35 percent of Montana's population, and the counties in which they are located are home to 62 percent of the state's population.

The geographic center of population of Montana is in sparsely populated Meagher County, in the town of White Sulphur Springs.

== Demographics ==
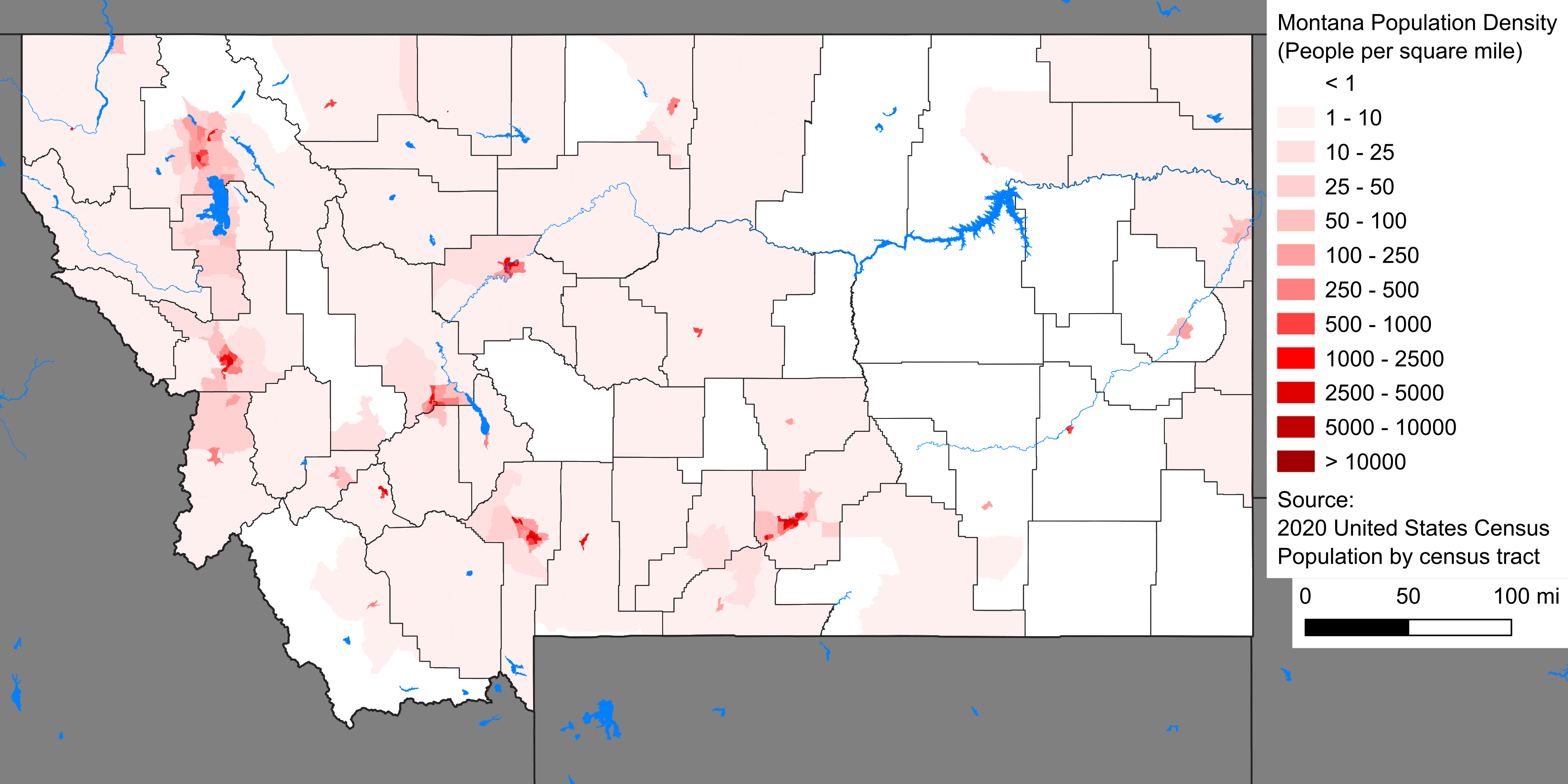
Montana population density map

Historical population
Census	Pop.	Note	%±
1870	20,595		—
1880	39,159		90.1%
1890	142,924		265.0%
1900	243,329		70.3%
1910	376,053		54.5%
1920	548,889		46.0%
1930	537,606		−2.1%
1940	559,456		4.1%
1950	591,024		5.6%
1960	674,767		14.2%
1970	694,409		2.9%
1980	786,690		13.3%
1990	799,065		1.6%
2000	902,195		12.9%
2010	989,415		9.7%
2020	1,084,225		9.6%
2025 (est.)	1,144,694		5.6%
Source: 1910–2020

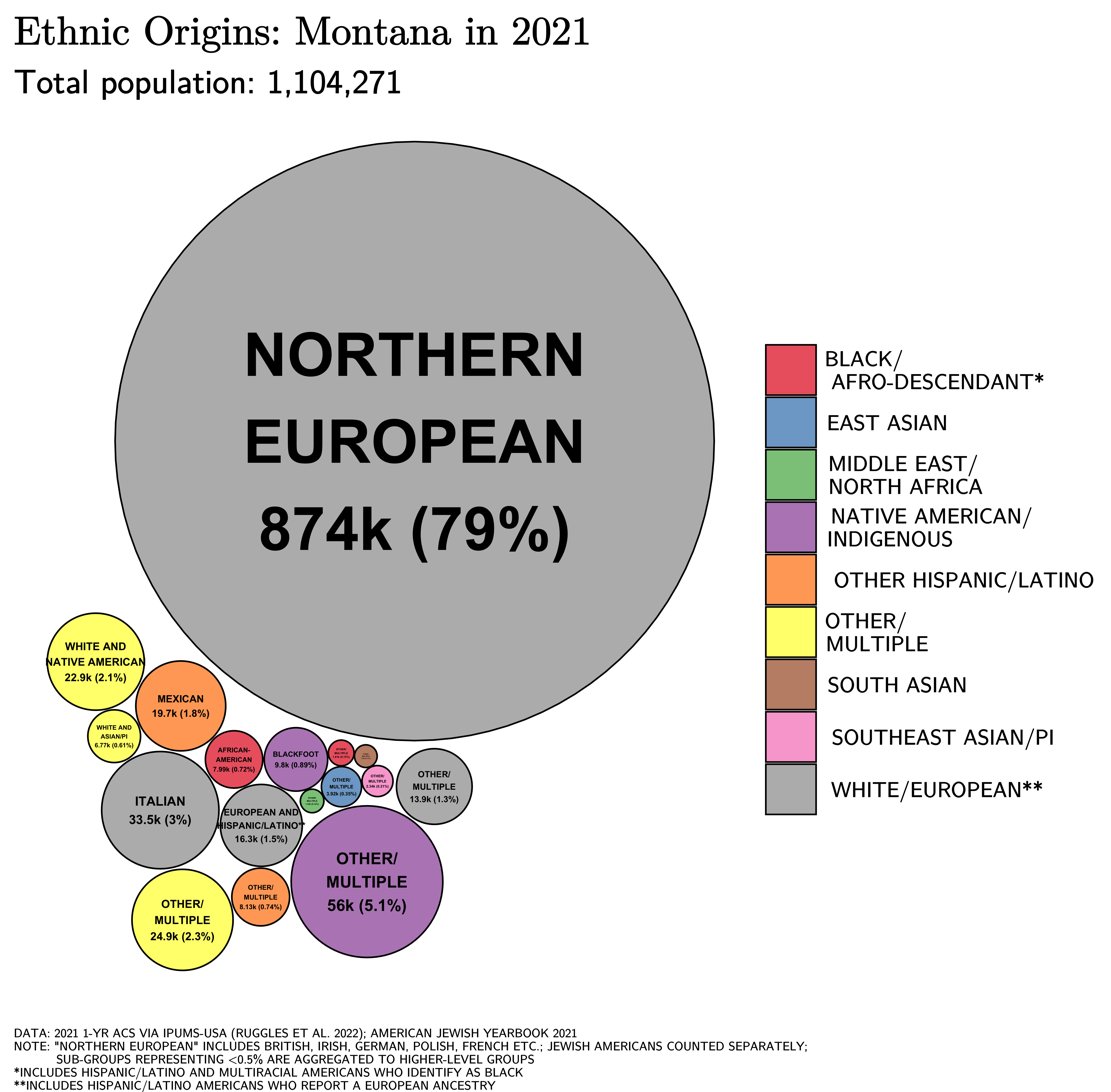
Ethnic origins in Montana

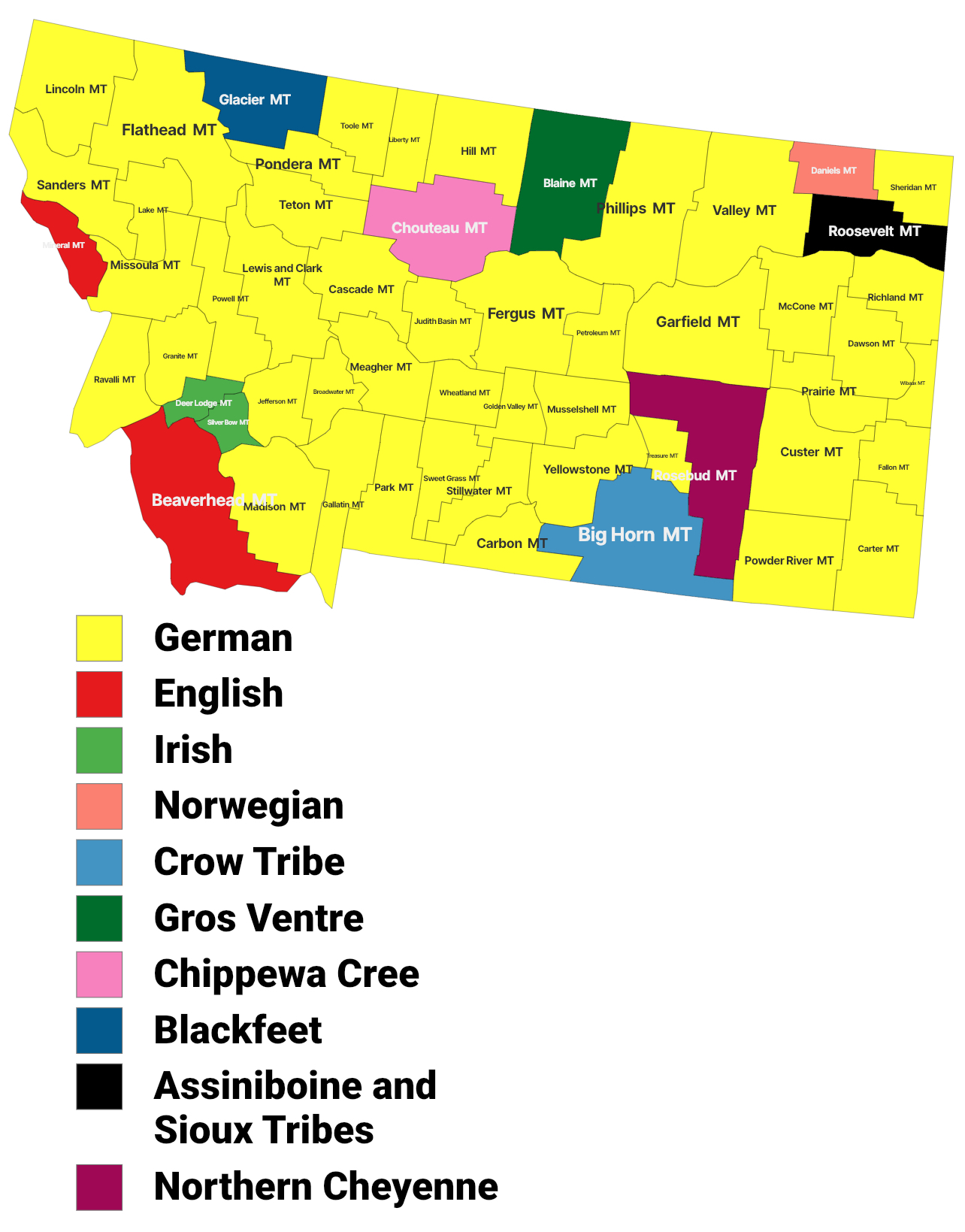
Largest alone or in any combination ethnic origin by county in Montana, per the 2020 census

Population of Montana 1870–2018

The United States Census Bureau states that the population of Montana was 1,132,812 on July 1, 2023, a 4.5% increase since the 2020 census. The 2020 census put Montana's population at 1,084,225. During the first decade of the new century, growth was mainly concentrated in Montana's seven largest counties, with the highest percentage growth in Gallatin County, which had a 32.9% increase in its population from 2010 to 2020. The city having the largest percentage growth was Kalispell, with 40.1%, and the city with the largest increase in actual residents was Billings, with an increase in population of 12,946 from 2010 to 2020.

On January 3, 2012, the Census and Economic Information Center (CEIC) at the Montana Department of Commerce estimated Montana had hit the one million population mark sometime between November and December 2011.

According to HUD's 2022 Annual Homeless Assessment Report, there were an estimated 1,585 homeless people in Montana.

In 2018, the top countries of origin for Montana's immigrants were Canada, Mexico, Germany, China, and Vietnam.

According to the 2020 census, 88.9% of the population was White (87.8% non-Hispanic White), 6.7% American Indian and Alaska Native, 4.1% Hispanics and Latinos of any race, 0.9% Asian, 0.6% Black or African American, 0.1% Native Hawaiian and other Pacific Islander, and 2.8% from two or more races. The largest European ancestry groups in Montana as of 2010 were: German (27.0%), Irish (14.8%), English (12.6%), Norwegian (10.9%), French (4.7%), and Italian (3.4%).

Montana racial breakdown of population
Racial composition	1990	2000	2010	2020
White	92.7%	90.6%	89.4%	88.9%
Native	6.0%	6.2%	6.3%	6.7%
Asian	0.5%	0.5%	0.6%	0.9%
Black	0.3%	0.3%	0.4%	0.6%
Native Hawaiian and other Pacific Islander	–	0.1%	0.1%	0.1%
Other race	0.5%	0.6%	0.6%	–
Two or more races	–	1.7%	2.5%	2.8%

Montana – Racial and ethnic composition Note: the US Census treats Hispanic/Latino as an ethnic category. This table excludes Latinos from the racial categories and assigns them to a separate category. Hispanics/Latinos may be of any race.
Race / Ethnicity (NH = Non-Hispanic)	Pop 2000	Pop 2010	Pop 2020	% 2000	% 2010	% 2020
White alone (NH)	807,823	868,628	901,318	89.54%	87.79%	83.13%
Black or African American alone (NH)	2,534	3,743	5,077	0.28%	0.38%	0.47%
Native American or Alaska Native alone (NH)	54,426	59,902	64,592	6.03%	6.05%	5.96%
Asian alone (NH)	4,569	6,138	8,077	0.51%	0.62%	0.74%
Pacific Islander alone (NH)	425	609	839	0.05%	0.06%	0.08%
Other race alone (NH)	569	540	4,374	0.06%	0.05%	0.40%
Mixed race or Multiracial (NH)	13,768	21,290	54,749	1.53%	2.15%	5.05%
Hispanic or Latino (any race)	18,081	28,565	45,199	2.00%	2.89%	4.17%
Total	902,195	989,415	1,084,225	100.00%	100.00%	100.00%

=== Intrastate demographics ===
Montana has a larger Native American population, both numerically and as a percentage, than most U.S. states. Ranked 45th in population (by the 2010 census) it is 19th in native people, who are 6.5% of the state's population—the sixth-highest percentage of all fifty states. Of Montana's 56 counties, Native Americans constitute a majority in three: Big Horn, Glacier, and Roosevelt. Other counties with large Native American populations include Blaine, Cascade, Hill, Missoula, and Yellowstone Counties. The state's Native American population grew by 27.9% between 1980 and 1990 (at a time when Montana's entire population rose 1.6%), and by 18.5 percent between 2000 and 2010.

Map of counties in Montana by racial plurality, per the 2020 U.S. census Legend: | Non-Hispanic White 50–60% 60–70% 70–80% 80–90% 90%+ | Native American 50–60% 60–70% 70–80% |

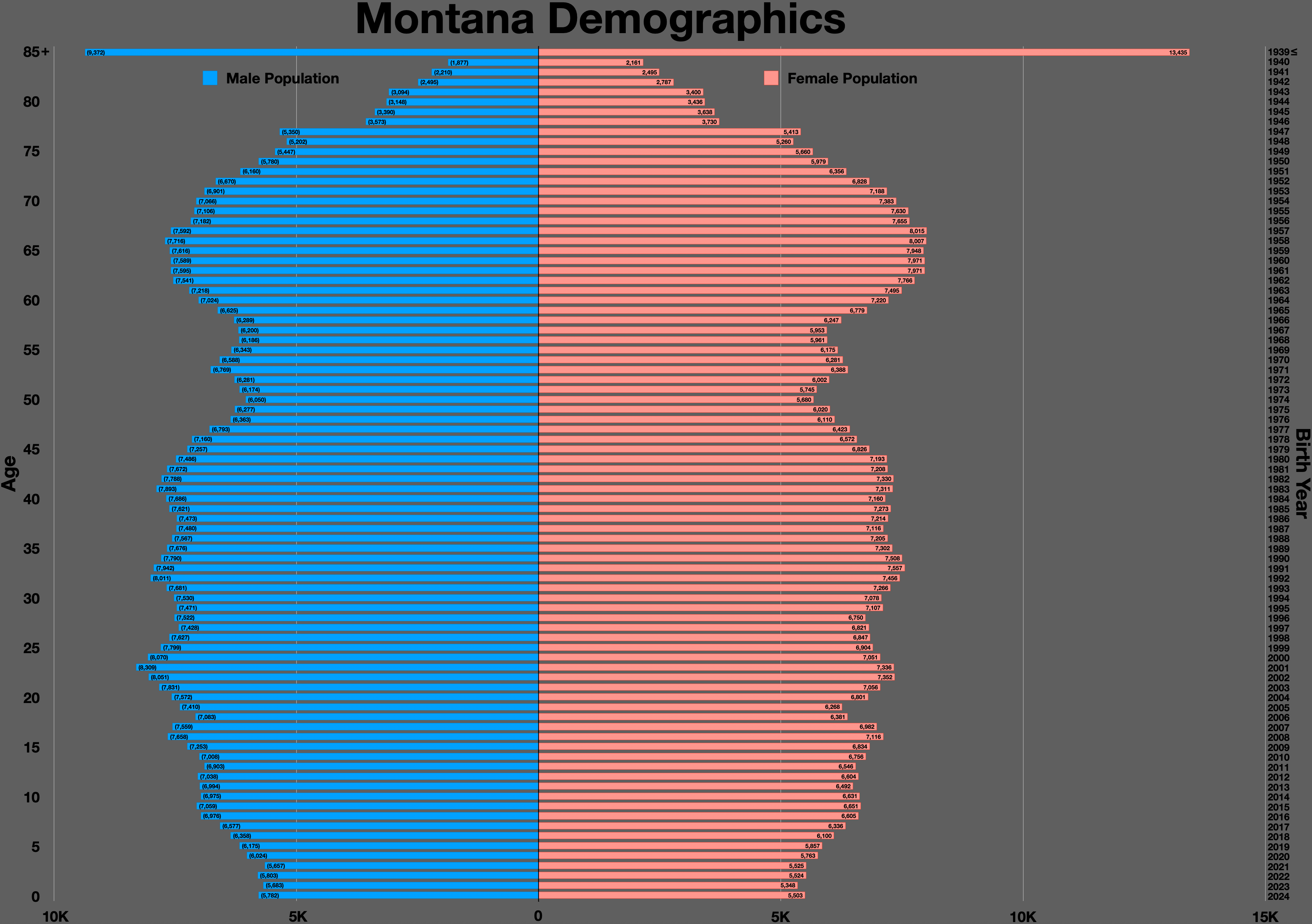
Montana population pyramid

As of 2009, almost two-thirds of Native Americans in the state live in urban areas. Of Montana's 20 largest cities, Polson (15.7%), Havre (13.0%), Great Falls (5.0%), Billings (4.4%), and Anaconda (3.1%) had the greatest percentages of Native American residents in 2010. Billings (4,619), Great Falls (2,942), Missoula (1,838), Havre (1,210), and Polson (706) have the most Native Americans living there. The state's seven reservations include more than 12 distinct Native American ethnolinguistic groups.

While the largest European American population in Montana is German (which may also include Austrian and Swiss, among other groups), pockets of significant Scandinavian ancestry are prevalent in some of the farming-dominated northern and eastern prairie regions, parallel to nearby regions of North Dakota and Minnesota. Farmers of Irish, Scots, and English roots also settled in Montana. The historically mining-oriented communities of western Montana such as Butte have a wider range of European American ethnicity; Finns, Eastern Europeans and especially Irish settlers left an indelible mark on the area, as well as people originally from British mining regions such as Cornwall, Devon, and Wales. The nearby city of Helena, also founded as a mining camp, had a similar mix in addition to a small Chinatown.

The Hutterites, an Anabaptist sect originally from Switzerland, settled in Montana, and today is second only to South Dakota in U.S. Hutterite population, with several colonies across the state. Beginning in the mid-1990s, the state also had an influx of Amish, who moved to Montana from increasingly urbanized areas of Ohio and Pennsylvania.

Montana's Hispanic population is concentrated in the Billings area in south-central Montana, where many of Montana's Mexican Americans have been in the state for generations. Great Falls has the highest percentage of African Americans in its population, although Billings has more African American residents than Great Falls. At 0.6%, Montana has the lowest percentage of African Americans out of any US state. No county in Montana is more than 2% African Americans. In the 2020 Census, 5,484 Montana residents were identified as African American. (Note: This figure refers to those who report African American and no other race.) African Americans in the five counties of Yellowstone (1,309), Cascade (1,196), Missoula (752), Gallatin (526), and Lewis and Clark (282) make up more than 74% of all African Americans in the state.

The Chinese in Montana, while a low percentage today, have been a historically important presence. About 2,000–3,000 Chinese miners were in the mining areas of Montana by 1870, and 2,500 in 1890. However, public opinion grew increasingly negative towards them in the 1890s, and nearly half of the state's Asian population left by 1900. Today, the Missoula area has a large Hmong population and the nearly 3,000 Montanans who claim Filipino ancestry are the largest Asian American group in the state.

In the 2015 United States census estimates, Montana had the second-highest percentage of U.S. military veterans living there. Only the state of Alaska had a higher percentage, with roughly 14 percent of Alaska's population over 18 being veterans, with Montana having roughly 12 percent of its population over 18 being veterans.

=== Native Americans ===
Map of Indian Reservations in Montana.

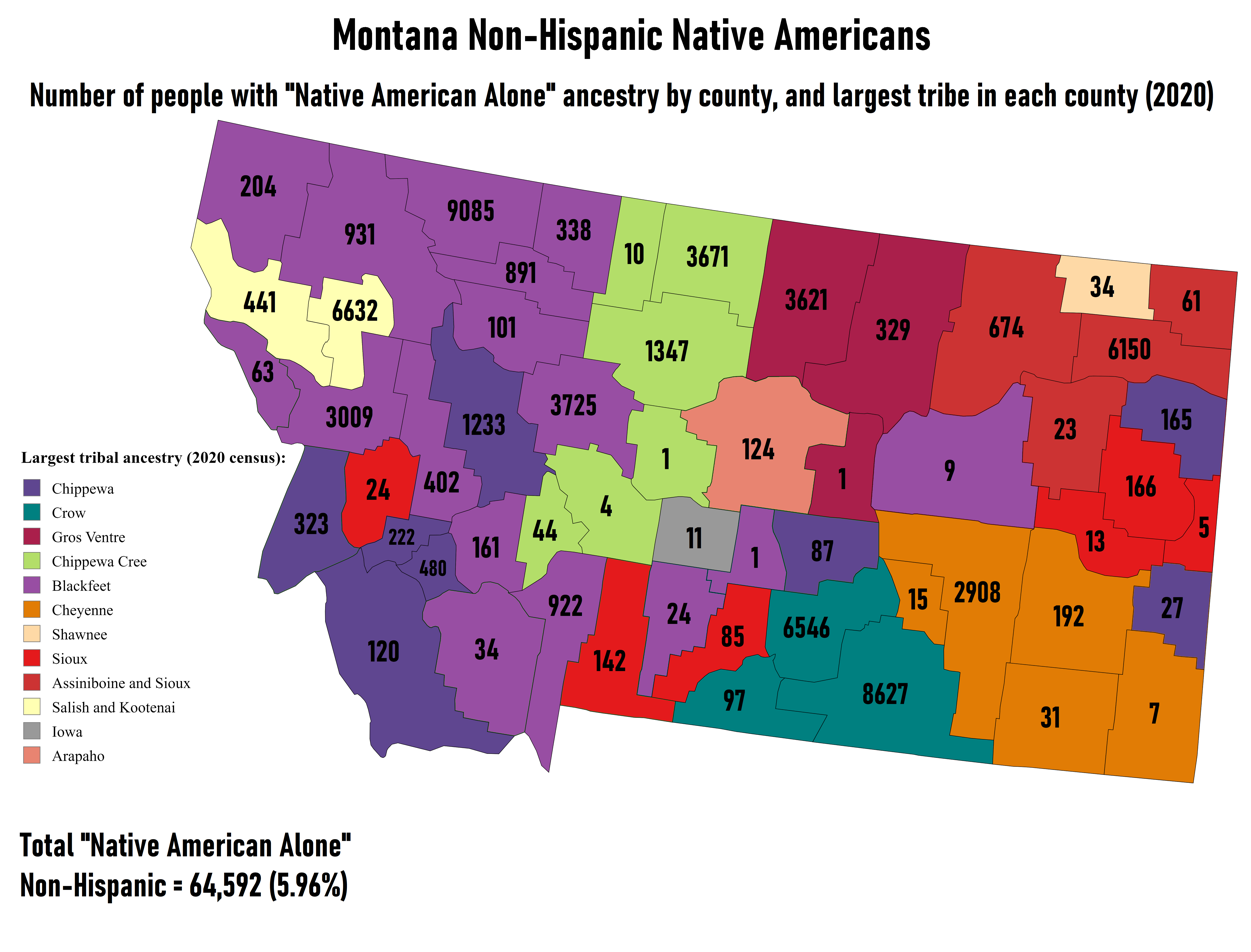
Largest Non-Hispanic Native American ancestry by county and numbers of people reporting "Native American Alone"

In 2020, 67,612 people in Montana self-identified as Native American, while 100,578 did in combination with one or more other races. Many treaties and federal legislation, including the Indian Appropriations Act (1851), the Dawes Act (1887), and the Indian Reorganization Act (1934), enabled the creation of seven Indian reservations, encompassing 11 federally recognized tribal nations, in Montana. A 12th nation, the Little Shell Tribe of Chippewa Indians of Great Falls, was recognized by the federal government in December 2019. The Blackfeet nation is headquartered on the Blackfeet Indian Reservation (1851) in Browning, Crow on the Crow Indian Reservation (1868) in Crow Agency, Confederated Salish and Kootenai and Pend d'Oreille on the Flathead Indian Reservation (1855) in Pablo, Northern Cheyenne on the Northern Cheyenne Indian Reservation (1884) at Lame Deer, Assiniboine and Gros Ventre on the Fort Belknap Indian Reservation (1888) in Fort Belknap Agency, Assiniboine and Sioux on the Fort Peck Indian Reservation (1888) at Poplar, and Chippewa-Cree on the Rocky Boy's Indian Reservation (1916) near Box Elder. Approximately 63% of all Native people live off the reservations, concentrated in the larger Montana cities, with the largest concentration of urban Indians in Great Falls. The state also has a small Métis population and 1990 census data indicated that people from as many as 275 different tribes lived in Montana.

Montana's Constitution specifically reads, "the state recognizes the distinct and unique cultural heritage of the American Indians and is committed in its educational goals to the preservation of their cultural integrity." It is the only state in the U.S. with such a constitutional mandate. The Indian Education for All Act was passed in 1999 to provide funding for this mandate and ensure implementation. It mandates that all schools teach American Indian history, culture, and heritage from preschool through college. For kindergarten through 12th-grade students, an "Indian Education for All" curriculum from the Montana Office of Public Instruction is available free to all schools. The state was sued in 2004 because of lack of funding, and the state has increased its support of the program. South Dakota passed similar legislation in 2007, and Wisconsin was working to strengthen its own program based on this model—and the current practices of Montana's schools. Each Indian reservation in the state has a fully accredited tribal college. The University of Montana "was the first to establish dual admission agreements with all of the tribal colleges and as such it was the first institution in the nation to actively facilitate student transfer from the tribal colleges." What is now Montana was at various times inhabited by tribes such as the Crow, the Blackfeet, the Assiniboine, the Gros Ventre, the Kootenai, the Flathead Salish and Kalispel, the Kiowa, the Sioux, the Arapaho, the Arikara, the Bannock, the Cheyenne, the Ojibwe, the Hidatsa, the Cree, the Nez Perce, the Mandan, the Shoshone and the Spokane. Many Montanans also reported belonging to various Native American tribes in 2010 census, the largest of which were the Blackfeet (12,831 people), the Crow (8,680 people), the Cheyenne (5,912), the Assiniboine Sioux (5,828), the Chippewa Cree (5,495), the Confederated Salish and Kootenai Tribes (4,809), the Ojibwe (4,284), the Sioux (2,698), the Assiniboine (2,673), the Gros Ventre (2,484) and the Salish tribal grouping (1,915). Other tribes included the Cree, the MHA Nation, the Kootenai, the Fort Belknap Indian Community, the Arapaho and more.

=== Births data ===
Note: Births in table do not add up, because Hispanics are counted both by their ethnicity and by their race, giving a higher overall number.

Live births by race/ethnicity of mother
Race	2014	2015	2016	2017	2018	2019	2020	2021	2022	2023	2024
White	10,153 (81.7%)	10,270 (81.6%)	9,761 (79.5%)	9,372 (79.4%)	9,224 (80.1%)	8,800 (79.4%)	8,639 (80.0%)	9,101 (81.0%)	8,995 (80.5%)	8,883 (80.2%)	9,056 (80.0%)
American Indian	1,585 (12.7%)	1,560 (12.4%)	1,347 (11.0%)	1,249 (10.6%)	1,177 (10.2%)	1,137 (10.2%)	1,063 (9.9%)	939 (8.4%)	946 (8.5%)	915 (8.3%)	914 (8.1%)
Asian	169 (1.3%)	152 (1.2%)	131 (1.1%)	121 (1.0%)	112 (1.0%)	115 (1.0%)	112 (1.0%)	105 (0.9%)	134 (1.2%)	110 (1.0%)	121 (1.1%)
Black	106 (0.8%)	103 (0.8%)	57 (0.5%)	64 (0.5%)	58 (0.5%)	61 (0.6%)	62 (0.6%)	71 (0.6%)	63 (0.6%)	60 (0.5%)	66 (0.6%)
Hispanic (any race)	494 (4.0%)	573 (4.5%)	548 (4.5%)	585 (5.0%)	558 (4.8%)	616 (5.6%)	569 (5.3%)	648 (5.7%)	678 (6.1%)	703 (6.3%)	783 (6.9%)
Total	12,432 (100%)	12,583 (100%)	12,282 (100%)	11,799 (100%)	11,513 (100%)	11,079 (100%)	10,791 (100%)	11,231 (100%)	11,175 (100%)	11,078 (100%)	11,331 (100%)

- Since 2016, data for births of White Hispanic origin are not collected, but included in one Hispanic group; persons of Hispanic origin may be of any race.

=== Languages ===
English is the official language in the state of Montana. According to the 2000 census, 94.8% of the population aged five and older speak English at home. Spanish is the language next most commonly spoken at home, with about 13,040 Spanish-language speakers in the state (1.4% of the population) in 2011. Also, 15,438 (1.7% of the state population) were speakers of Indo-European languages other than English or Spanish, 10,154 (1.1%) were speakers of a Native American language, and 4,052 (0.4%) were speakers of an Asian or Pacific Islander language.

Other languages spoken in Montana (as of 2013) include Assiniboine (about 150 speakers in Montana and Canada), Blackfoot (about 100 speakers), Cheyenne (about 1,700 speakers), Plains Cree (about 100 speakers), Crow (about 3,000 speakers), Dakota (about 17,800 speakers with 700 in Montana in 2010), German Hutterite (about 5,600 speakers), Gros Ventre (about 10 speakers), Kalispel-Pend d'Oreille (about 64 speakers), Kutenai (about six speakers), and Lakota (6,000 speakers in Minnesota, Montana, Nebraska, North Dakota, South Dakota).

The United States Department of Education estimated in 2009 that 5,274 students in Montana spoke a language at home other than English. These included a Native American language (64%), German (4%), Spanish (3%), Russian (1%), and Chinese (less than 0.5%).

Top 14 non-English languages spoken in Montana
Language	Percentage of population (as of 2000)
Spanish	1.5%
German	1.1%
French and Crow (tied)	0.4%
Scandinavian languages (including Danish, Norwegian, and Swedish)	0.2%
Italian, Japanese, Russian, Native American languages (other than Crow; significantly Cheyenne), Slavic languages (including Czech, Slovak, and Ukrainian) (tied)	0.1%

Religious self-identification, per Public Religion Research Institute's 2022 American Values Survey
1. Protestantism (43.0%)
2. Catholicism (17.0%)
3. Mormonism (2.00%)
4. Unaffiliated (32.0%)
5. New Age (2.00%)
6. Judaism (1.00%)
7. Buddhism (1.00%)
8. Other (2.00%)

=== Religion ===
According to the Pew Research Center in 2014, the religious affiliations of the people of Montana were predominantly Christian; in the state, Christianity was 65% of the total adult population. At the 2020 Public Religion Research Institute's (PRRI) study, 57% of the adult population were Christian. While Catholicism was the largest single Christian group in the state, mainline and evangelical Protestantism dominated the Christian landscape collectively. By the Public Religion Research Institute's 2022 survey, Christianity grew to 62% of the population altogether, with 43% Protestant, 17% Catholic, and 2% Restorationist through Mormonism.

The largest Christian denominations in Montana as of 2010 were the Catholic Church with 127,612 adherents, the Church of Jesus Christ of Latter-day Saints with 46,484 adherents, Evangelical Lutheran Church in America with 38,665 adherents, and non-denominational evangelical Protestants with 27,370 adherents. In 2020, the largest Christian denominations by adherents were the following: the Catholic Church (112,389), non-denominational Protestantism (54,540), and the Church of Jesus Christ of Latter-day Saints (50,552).

In 2014, 30% of the population was irreligious, and in 2020's separate study, 34% of the population were irreligious. Among its non-Christian population in 2022's PRRI study, the unaffiliated made up 32% of the population. New Age spirituality was 2% of the population, Judaism 1%, and Buddhism 1%. Other faiths accounted for 2% of the state's population.

== Economy ==
Montana's Per Capita Income Distribution by County

Total Montana per capita income (wikidata:Q1212) = 32,463 US$ (2020 survey methodology)
(WD = Wikidata page)

[Hide/show County Per Capita Income]
	Montana	per. US$	year
1	Beaverhead County, Montana	28,798	2020^{WD}
2	Big Horn County, Montana	19,109	2020^{WD}
3	Blaine County, Montana	20,586	2020^{WD}
4	Broadwater County, Montana	31,573	2020^{WD}
5	Carbon County, Montana	34,751	2020^{WD}
6	Carter County, Montana	27,759	2020^{WD}
7	Cascade County, Montana	30,572	2020^{WD}
8	Chouteau County, Montana	26,243	2020^{WD}
9	Custer County, Montana	31,267	2020^{WD}
10	Daniels County, Montana	33,614	2020^{WD}
11	Dawson County, Montana	30,821	2020^{WD}
12	Deer Lodge County, Montana	26,207	2020^{WD}
13	Fallon County, Montana	36,409	2020^{WD}
14	Fergus County, Montana	28,211	2020^{WD}
15	Flathead County, Montana	32,242	2020^{WD}
16	Gallatin County, Montana	38,885	2020^{WD}
17	Garfield County, Montana	29,149	2020^{WD}
18	Glacier County, Montana	18,440	2020^{WD}
19	Golden Valley County, Montana	30,053	2020^{WD}
20	Granite County, Montana	32,401	2020^{WD}
21	Hill County, Montana	23,922	2020^{WD}
22	Jefferson County, Montana	33,716	2020^{WD}
23	Judith Basin County, Montana	33,720	2020^{WD}
24	Lake County, Montana	26,889	2020^{WD}
25	Lewis and Clark County, Montana	36,485	2020^{WD}
26	Liberty County, Montana	46,198	2020^{WD}
27	Lincoln County, Montana	25,169	2020^{WD}
28	Madison County, Montana	35,668	2020^{WD}
29	McCone County, Montana	31,242	2020^{WD}
30	Meagher County, Montana	26,392	2020^{WD}
31	Mineral County, Montana	28,644	2020^{WD}
32	Missoula County, Montana	33,358	2020^{WD}
33	Musselshell County, Montana	27,843	2020^{WD}
34	Park County, Montana	35,446	2020^{WD}
35	Petroleum County, Montana	28,220	2020^{WD}
36	Phillips County, Montana	26,825	2020^{WD}
37	Pondera County, Montana	27,114	2020^{WD}
38	Powder River County, Montana	33,170	2020^{WD}
39	Powell County, Montana	25,002	2020^{WD}
40	Prairie County, Montana	28,892	2020^{WD}
41	Ravalli County, Montana	31,545	2020^{WD}
42	Richland County, Montana	30,330	2020^{WD}
43	Roosevelt County, Montana	18,669	2020^{WD}
44	Rosebud County, Montana	25,557	2020^{WD}
45	Sanders County, Montana	26,103	2020^{WD}
46	Sheridan County, Montana	37,958	2020^{WD}
47	Silver Bow County, Montana	28,221	2020^{WD}
48	Stillwater County, Montana	35,387	2020^{WD}
49	Sweet Grass County, Montana	27,553	2020^{WD}
50	Teton County, Montana	27,985	2020^{WD}
51	Toole County, Montana	30,213	2020^{WD}
52	Treasure County, Montana	33,685	2020^{WD}
53	Valley County, Montana	28,440	2020^{WD}
54	Wheatland County, Montana	21,409	2020^{WD}
55	Wibaux County, Montana	26,405	2020^{WD}
56	Yellowstone County, Montana	37,261	2020^{WD}

Montana ranks 3rd nationally in craft breweries per capita.

In 2025, the U.S. Bureau of Economic Analysis estimated Montana's gross domestic product was $82.3 billion and the state's per capita personal income was $72,340.

- Total employment: 409,312 (As of 2023)
- Total employer establishments: 42,566 (As of 2023)

Montana is a relative hub of beer microbrewing, ranking third in the nation in number of craft breweries per capita in 2024. Significant industries exist for lumber and mineral extraction; the state's resources include gold, coal, silver, talc, and vermiculite. Ecotaxes on resource extraction are numerous. A 1974 state severance tax on coal (which varied from 20 to 30%) was upheld by the Supreme Court of the United States in Commonwealth Edison Co. v. Montana, 453 U.S. 609 (1981).

According to Montana's Secretary of State Christi Jacobsen, Montana has experienced a record number of new businesses registered four consecutive years as of 2025. According to the report, new business formations increased from 4,900 in the month of September 2024, to more than 6,000 in September 2025.

Tourism is also important to the economy, with more than ten million visitors a year to Glacier National Park, Flathead Lake, the Missouri River headwaters, the site of the Battle of Little Bighorn, and three of the five entrances to Yellowstone National Park. In 2023 outdoor recreation accounted for 4.6% of Montana gross domestic product which is the third highest percentage of any state. Employment in the outdoor sector was 5.8% of all jobs, also placing it third in the nation. The state has held third in these categories for more than a decade.

Montana's corporate income tax, as of 2025, is 6.75 percent, while the state's personal income tax contains seven brackets, with rates ranging from 1.0 to 6.75 percent. Montana has no sales tax, and household goods are exempt from property taxes. However, property taxes are assessed on livestock, farm machinery, heavy equipment, automobiles, trucks, and business equipment. The amount of property tax owed is not determined solely by the property's value. The property's value is multiplied by a tax rate, set by the Montana Legislature, to determine its taxable value. The taxable value is then multiplied by the mill levy established by various taxing jurisdictions—city and county government, school districts, and others.

In the 1980s the absence of a sales tax became economically deleterious to communities bound to the state's tourism industry, as the revenue from income and property taxes provided by residents was grossly insignificant in regards to paying for the impact of non-residential travel—especially road repair. In 1985, the Montana Legislature passed a law allowing towns with fewer than 5,500 residents and unincorporated communities with fewer than 2,500 to levy a resort tax if more than half the community's income came from tourism. The resort tax is a sales tax that applies to hotels, motels and other lodging and camping facilities; restaurants, fast-food stores, and other food service establishments; taverns, bars, night clubs, lounges, or other public establishments that serve alcohol; as well as destination ski resorts or other destination recreational facilities.

It also applies to "luxuries"- defined by law as any item normally sold to the public or to transient visitors or tourists that does not include food purchased unprepared or unserved, medicine, medical supplies and services, appliances, hardware supplies and tools, or any necessities of life. Approximately 12.2 million non-residents visited Montana in 2018, and the population was estimated to be 1.06 million. This extremely disproportionate ratio of residents paying taxes vs. non-residents using state-funded services and infrastructure makes Montana's resort tax crucial in order to safely maintain heavily used roads and highways, as well as protect and preserve state parks.

As of August 2025, the state's unemployment rate is 2.9%. The lowest historical rate was 2.4% in February 2023, and the highest was 11.9% in April 2020 during the early COVID-19 pandemic in the United States.

== Education ==
=== Colleges and universities ===
The Montana University System consists of:

- Dawson Community College
- Flathead Valley Community College
- Miles Community College
- Montana State University Bozeman
  - Gallatin College Montana State University Bozeman
  - Montana State University Billings
  - City College at Montana State University Billings Billings
  - Montana State University-Northern Havre
  - Great Falls College Montana State University Great Falls
- University of Montana Missoula
  - Missoula College University of Montana Missoula
  - Montana Tech of the University of Montana Butte
  - Highlands College of Montana Tech Butte
  - University of Montana Western Dillon
  - Helena College University of Montana Helena
  - Bitterroot College University of Montana Hamilton

Tribal colleges in Montana include:

- Aaniiih Nakoda College Harlem
- Blackfeet Community College Browning
- Chief Dull Knife College Lame Deer
- Fort Peck Community College Poplar
- Little Big Horn College Crow Agency
- Salish Kootenai College Pablo
- Stone Child College Box Elder

Four private colleges are in Montana:

- Carroll College
- Rocky Mountain College
- University of Providence

=== Schools ===
The Montana Territory was formed on April 26, 1864, when the U.S. passed the Organic Act. Schools started forming in the area before it was officially a territory as families started settling into the area. The first schools were subscription schools that typically met in the teacher's home. The first formal school on record was at Fort Owen in Bitterroot valley in 1862. The students were Indian children and the children of Fort Owen employees. The first school term started in early winter and lasted only until February 28. Classes were taught by Mr. Robinson. Another early subscription school was started by Thomas Dimsdale in Virginia City in 1863. In this school students were charged $1.75 per week. The Montana Territorial Legislative Assembly had its inaugural meeting in 1864. The first legislature authorized counties to levy taxes for schools, which set the foundations for public schooling. Madison County was the first to take advantage of the newly authorized taxes and it formed the first public school in Virginia City in 1886. The first school year was scheduled to begin in January 1866, but severe weather postponed its opening until March. The first school year ran through the summer and did not end until August 17. One of the first teachers at the school was Sarah Raymond. She was a 25-year-old woman who had traveled to Virginia City via wagon train in 1865. To become a certified teacher, Raymond took a test in her home and paid a $6 fee in gold dust to obtain a teaching certificate. With the help of an assistant teacher, Mrs. Farley, Raymond was responsible for teaching 50 to 60 students each day out of the 81 students enrolled at the school. Sarah Raymond was paid $125 per month, and Mrs. Farley was paid $75 per month. No textbooks were used in the school. In their place was an assortment of books brought by various emigrants. Raymond quit teaching the following year, but she later became the Madison County superintendent of schools.

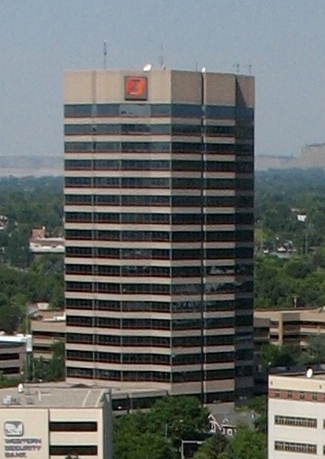
First Interstate Center, in downtown Billings, is the tallest building in Montana.

== Culture ==
Many well-known artists, photographers and authors have documented the land, culture and people of Montana in the last 130 years. Painter and sculptor Charles Marion Russell, known as "the cowboy artist", created more than 2,000 paintings of cowboys, Native Americans, and landscapes set in the Western United States and in Alberta, Canada. The C. M. Russell Museum Complex in Great Falls, Montana, houses more than 2,000 Russell artworks, personal objects, and artifacts.

Pioneering feminist author, film-maker, and media personality Mary MacLane attained international fame in 1902 with her memoir of three months in her life in Butte, The Story of Mary MacLane. She referred to Butte throughout the rest of her career and remains a controversial figure there for her mixture of criticism and love for Butte and its people.

Evelyn Cameron, a naturalist and photographer from Terry documented early 20th-century life on the Montana prairie, taking startlingly clear pictures of everything around her: cowboys, sheepherders, weddings, river crossings, freight wagons, people working, badlands, eagles, coyotes and wolves.

Many notable Montana authors have documented or been inspired by life in Montana in both fiction and non-fiction works. Pulitzer Prize winner Wallace Earle Stegner from Great Falls was often called "The Dean of Western Writers". James Willard Schultz ("Apikuni") from Browning is most noted for his prolific stories about Blackfeet life and his contributions to the naming of prominent features in Glacier National Park.

=== Major cultural events ===
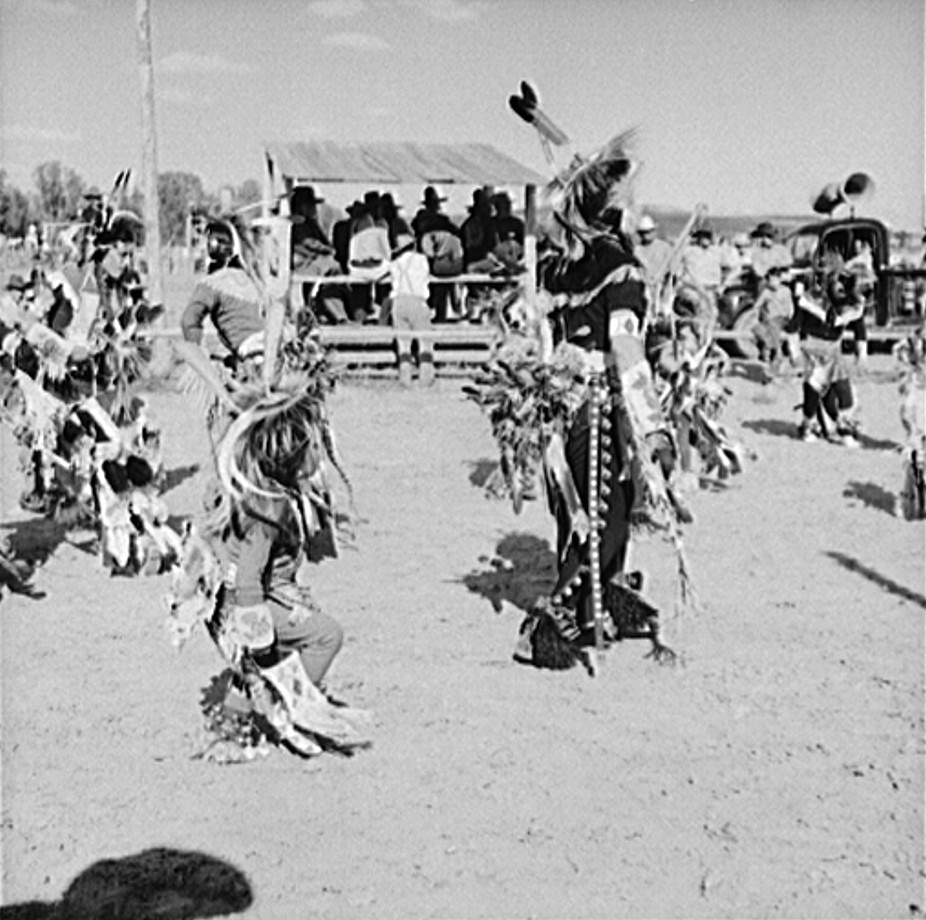
Dancers at Crow Fair in 1941

Montana hosts numerous arts and cultural festivals and events every year. Major events include:

- Bozeman was once known as the "Sweet Pea capital of the nation" referencing the prolific edible pea crop. To promote the area and celebrate its prosperity, local business owners began a "Sweet Pea Carnival" that included a parade and queen contest. The annual event lasted from 1906 to 1916. Promoters used the inedible but fragrant and colorful sweet pea flower as an emblem of the celebration. In 1977 the "Sweet Pea" concept was revived as an arts festival rather than a harvest celebration, growing into a three-day event that is one of the largest festivals in Montana.
- Montana Shakespeare in the Parks has been performing free, live theatrical productions of Shakespeare and other classics throughout Montana and the Northwest region since 1973. The organization is an outreach endeavor that is part of the College of Arts & Architecture at Montana State University, Bozeman. The Montana Shakespeare Company is based in Helena.
- Since 1909, the Crow Fair and Rodeo, near Hardin, has been an annual event every August in Crow Agency and is the largest Northern Native American gathering, attracting nearly 45,000 spectators and participants. Since 1952, North American Indian Days has been held every July in Browning.
- Lame Deer hosts the annual Northern Cheyenne Powwow.

=== Sports ===
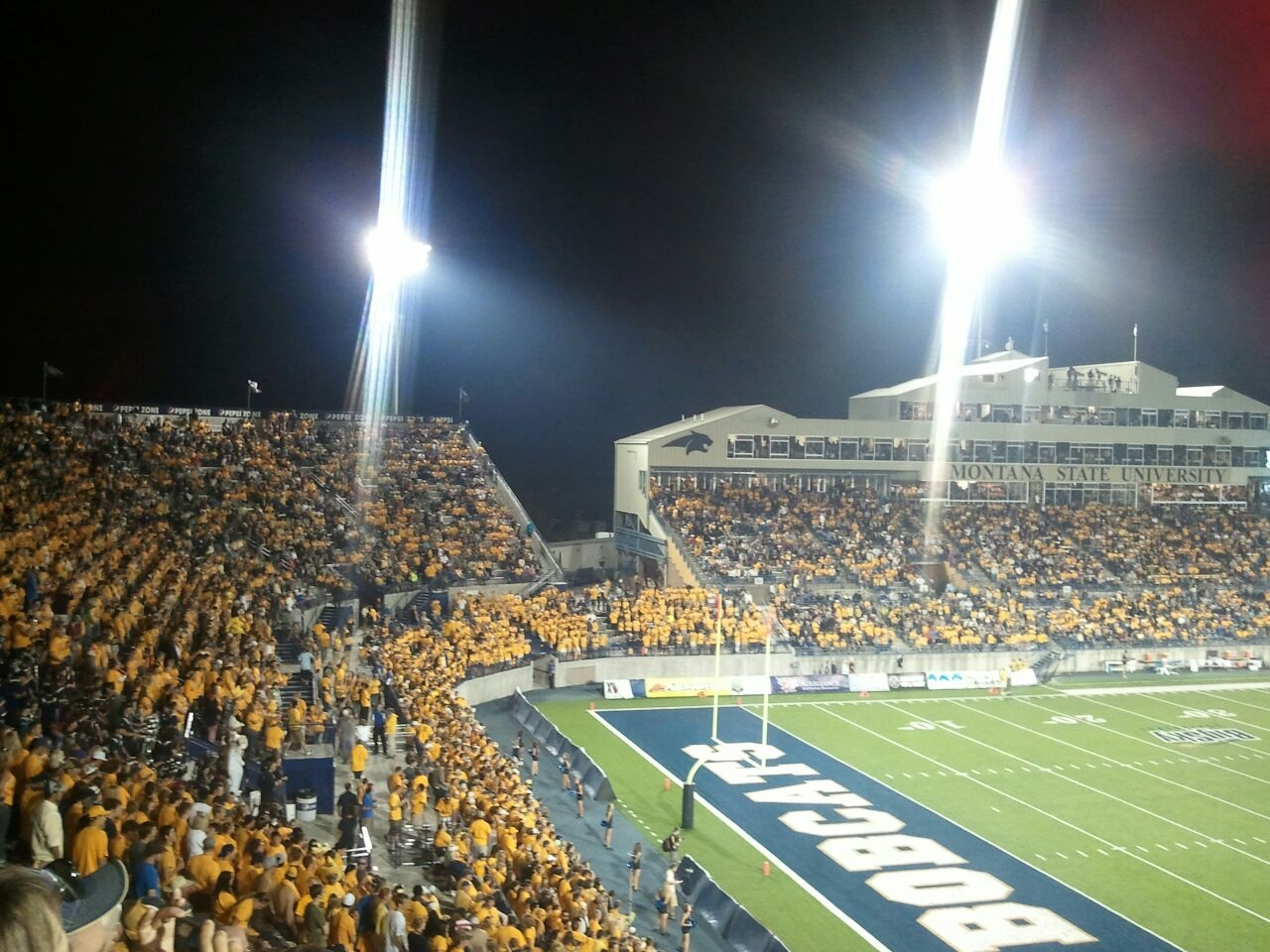
Montana State Bobcats football at Bobcat Stadium (Montana State University), Bozeman

==== Professional sports ====
There are no major league sports franchises in Montana due to the state's relatively small and dispersed population, but a number of minor league teams play in the state. Baseball is the minor-league sport with the longest heritage in the state and Montana is home to four independent teams, all members of the Pioneer League: the Billings Mustangs, Great Falls Voyagers, Missoula PaddleHeads and the Glacier Range Riders.

==== College sports ====
All of Montana's four-year colleges and universities field intercollegiate sports teams. The two largest schools, the University of Montana and Montana State University, are members of the Big Sky Conference and have enjoyed a strong athletic rivalry since the early twentieth century. Six of Montana's smaller four-year schools are members of the Frontier Conference. One is a member of the Great Northwest Athletic Conference.

==== Other sports ====
A variety of sports are offered at Montana high schools. Montana allows the smallest—"Class C"—high schools to utilize six-man football teams, dramatized in the independent 2002 film The Slaughter Rule.

There are four junior ice hockey teams in Montana, all of which are affiliated with the North American 3 Hockey League: the Bozeman Icedogs, Butte Irish, Great Falls Americans, and Helena Bighorns.

==== Olympic competitors ====
- Ski jumping champion and United States Skiing Hall of Fame inductee Casper Oimoen was captain of the U.S. Olympic team at the 1936 Winter Olympics while he was a resident of Montana. He placed thirteenth that year, and had previously finished fifth at the 1932 Winter Olympics.
- Montana has produced two U.S. champions and Olympic competitors in men's figure skating, both from Great Falls: John Misha Petkevich, lived and trained in Montana before entering college, competed in the 1968 and 1972 Winter Olympics. Scott Davis, also from Great Falls, competed at the 1994 Winter Olympics.
- Missoulian Tommy Moe won Olympic gold and silver medals at the 1994 Winter Olympics in downhill skiing and super G, the first American skier to win two medals at any Winter Olympics.
- Eric Bergoust, also of Missoula, won an Olympic gold medal in freestyle aerial skiing at the 1998 Winter Olympics, also competing in 1994, 2002 and 2006 Olympics plus winning 13 World Cup titles.
- Maggie Voisin, of Whitefish, competed in the 2018 and 2022 Winter Olympics as a skier. She also qualified for the 2014 Winter Olympics but was unable to compete as she broke her ankle during training.

==== Sporting achievements ====
Montanans have been a part of several major sporting achievements:

- In 1889, Spokane became the first and only Montana horse to win the Kentucky Derby. For this accomplishment, the horse was admitted to the Montana Cowboy Hall of Fame in 2008.
- In 1904 a basketball team of young Native American women from Fort Shaw, after playing undefeated during their previous season, went to the Louisiana Purchase Exposition held in St. Louis in 1904, defeated all challenging teams and were declared to be world champions.
- In 1923, the controversial Jack Dempsey vs. Tommy Gibbons fight for the heavyweight boxing championship, won by Dempsey, took place in Shelby.

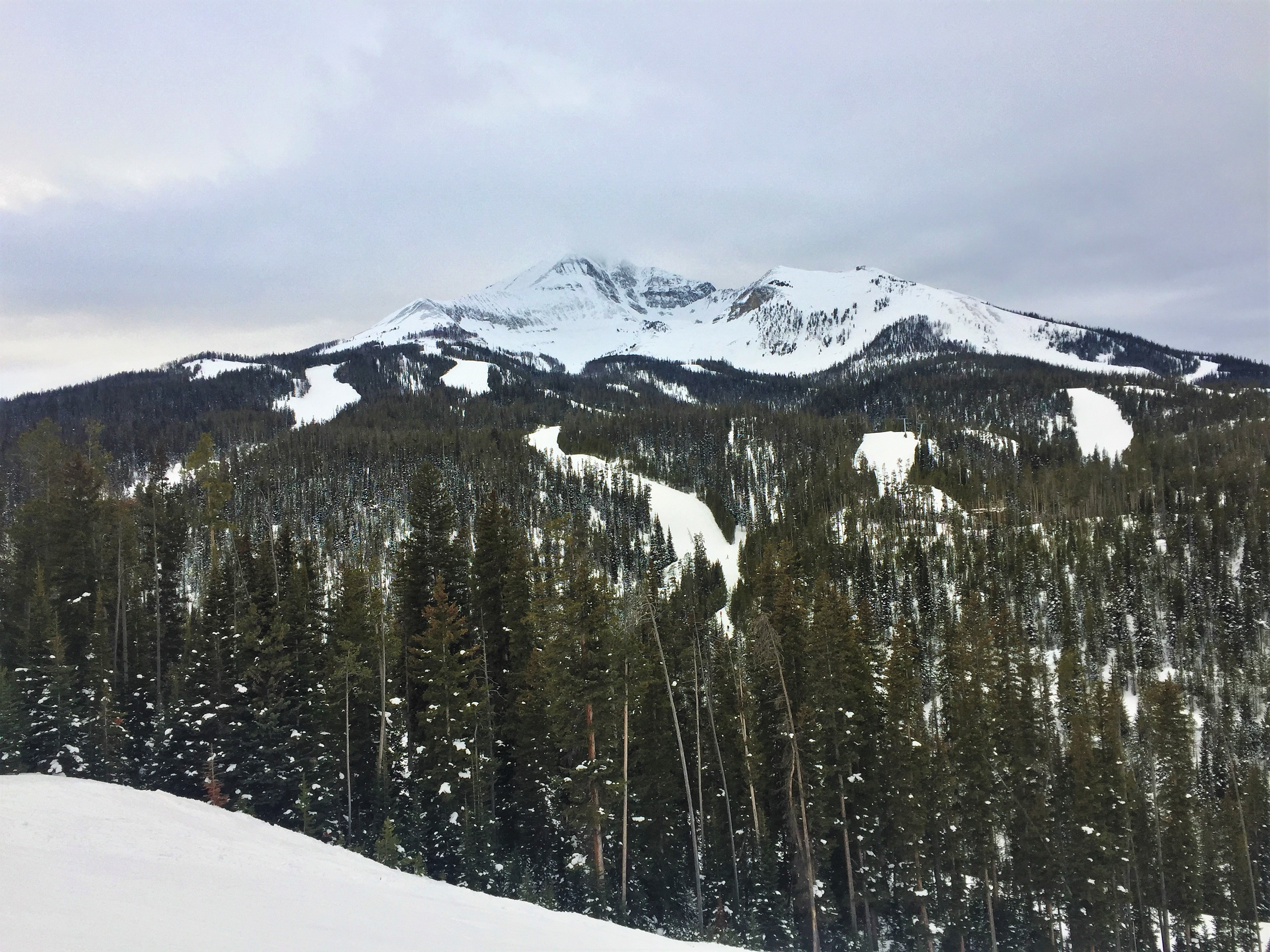
Lone Mountain at Big Sky Ski Resort

=== Outdoor recreation ===
Montana provides year-round outdoor recreation opportunities for residents and visitors. Hiking, fishing, hunting, watercraft recreation, camping, golf, cycling, horseback riding, and skiing are popular activities.

==== Fishing and hunting ====
Montana has been a destination for its world-class trout fisheries since the 1930s. Fly fishing for several species of native and introduced trout in rivers and lakes is popular for both residents and tourists throughout the state. Montana is the home of the Federation of Fly Fishers and hosts many of the organization's annual conclaves. The state has robust recreational lake trout and kokanee salmon fisheries in the west, walleye can be found in many parts of the state, while northern pike, smallmouth and largemouth bass fisheries as well as catfish and paddlefish can be found in the waters of eastern Montana. Robert Redford's 1992 film of Norman Mclean's novel, A River Runs Through It, was filmed in Montana and brought national attention to fly fishing and the state. Fishing makes up a sizeable component of Montana's total tourism economic output: in 2017, nonresidents generated $4.7 billion in economic output, of which, $1.3 billion was generated by visitor groups participating in guided fishing experiences.

There are fall bow and general hunting seasons for elk, pronghorn antelope, whitetail deer and mule deer. A random draw grants a limited number of permits for moose, mountain goats and bighorn sheep. There is a spring hunting season for black bear and limited hunting of bison that leave Yellowstone National Park has been allowed. Current law allows both hunters and trappers specified numbers ("limits") of wolves and mountain lions. Trapping of assorted fur-bearing animals is allowed in certain seasons and many opportunities exist for migratory waterfowl and upland bird hunting. The Rocky Mountain Elk Foundation, which protects wildlife habitat and promotes hunting heritage, was founded in Montana.

==== Winter sports ====
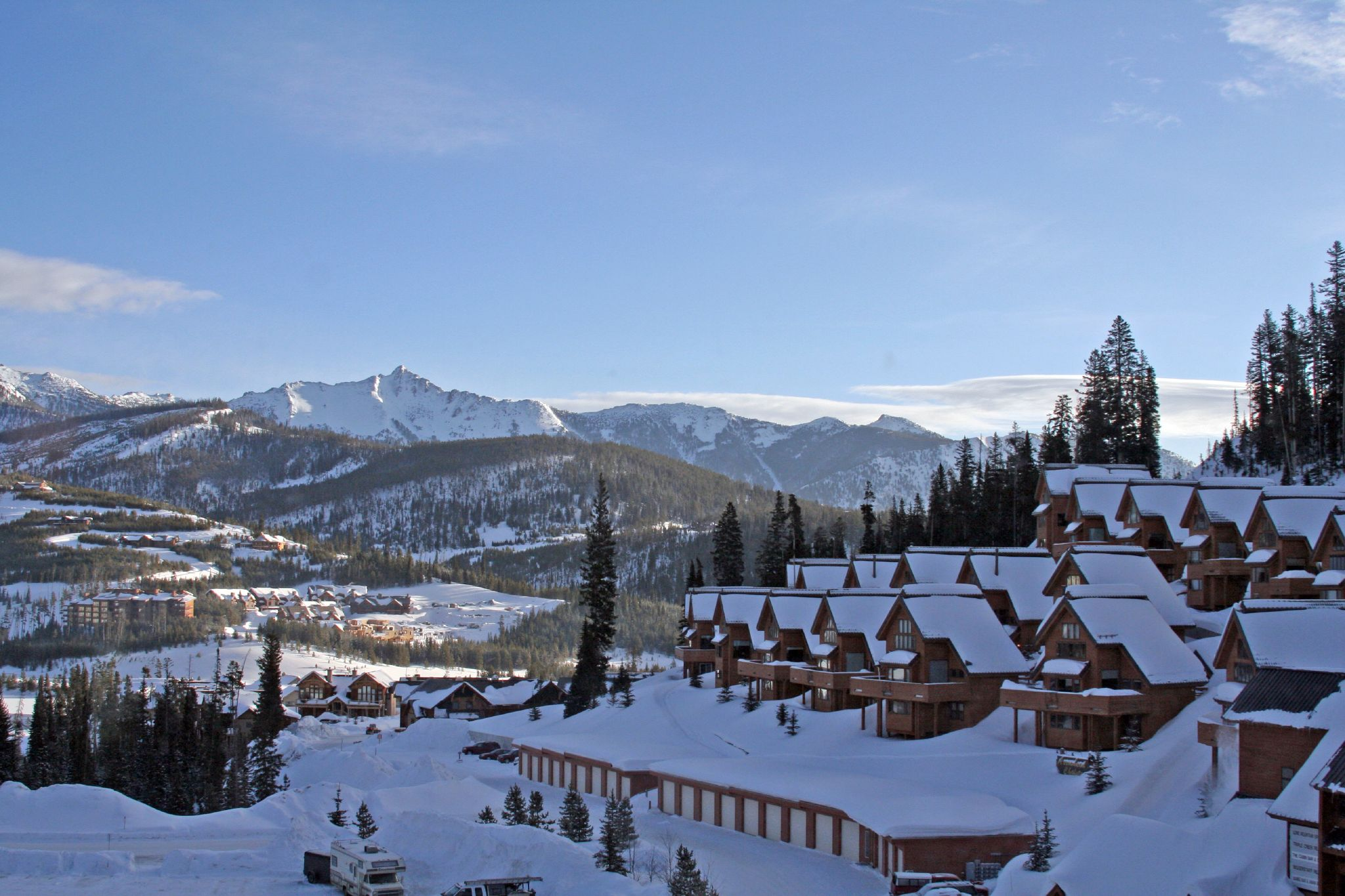
The Big Sky Resort

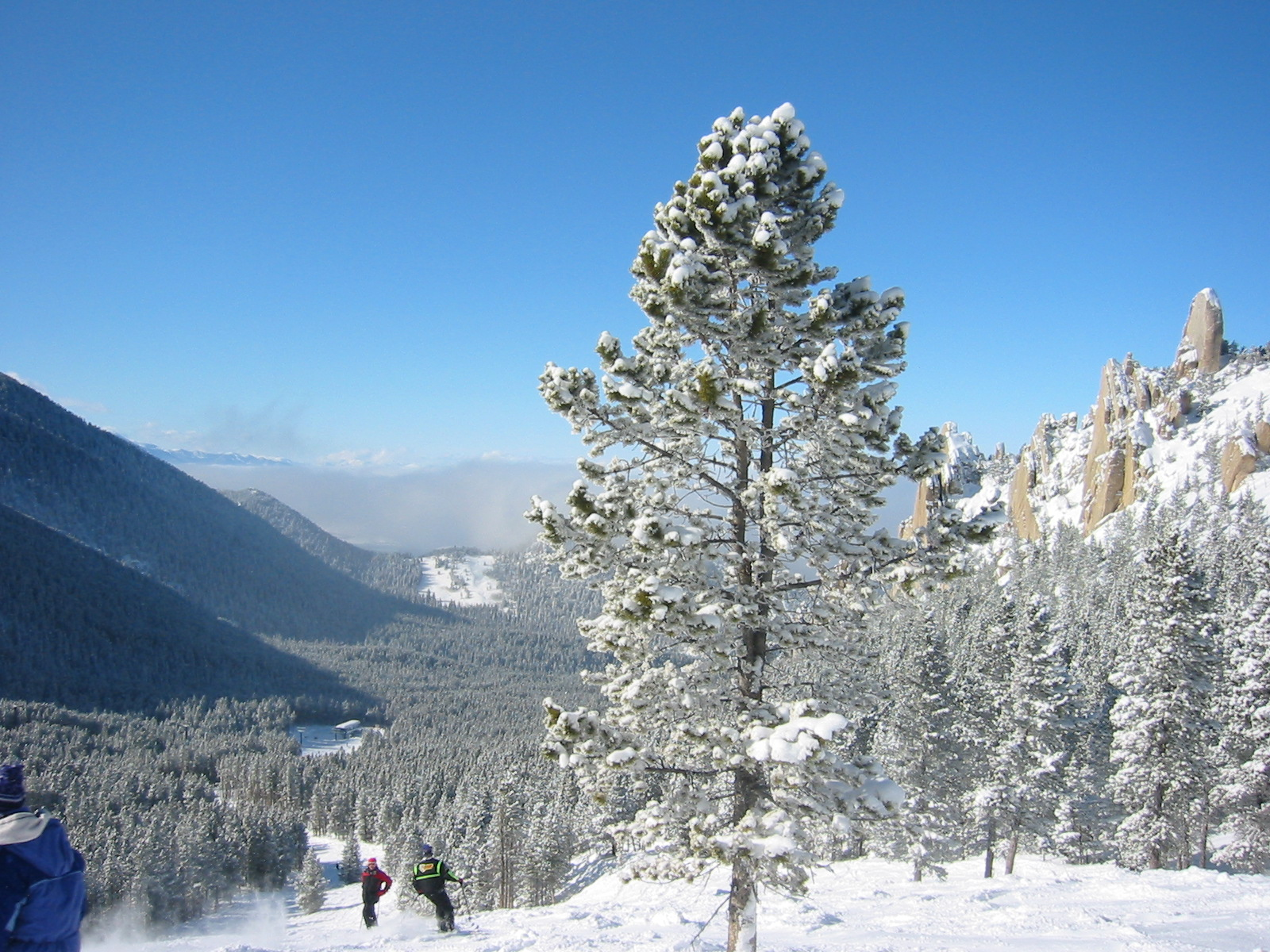
The Palisades area on the north end of the ski area at Red Lodge Mountain Resort

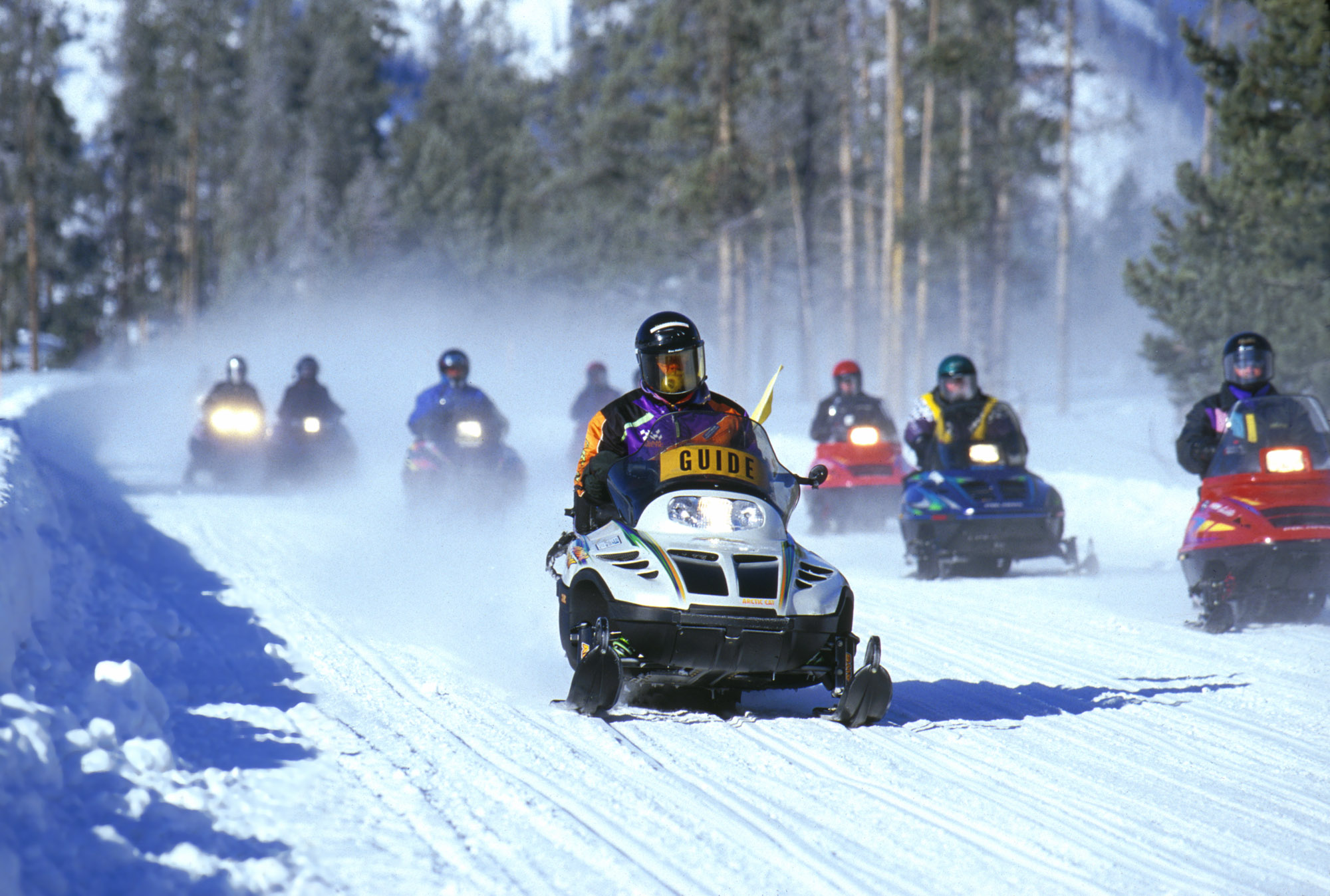
Guided snowmobile tours in Yellowstone Park

Both downhill skiing and cross-country skiing are popular in Montana, and there are 15 developed downhill ski areas open to the public, including:

- Bear Paw Ski Bowl near Havre
- Big Sky Resort in Big Sky
- Blacktail Mountain Ski Area near Lakeside
- Bridger Bowl Ski Area near Bozeman
- Discovery Ski Area near Philipsburg
- Great Divide Ski Area near Helena
- Lookout Pass Ski and Recreation Area off Interstate 90 at the Montana-Idaho border
- Lost Trail Powder Mountain near Darby
- Maverick Mountain Ski Area near Dillon
- Montana Snowbowl near Missoula
- Red Lodge Mountain Resort near Red Lodge
- Showdown Ski Area near White Sulphur Springs
- Teton Pass Ski Area near Choteau
- Turner Mountain Ski Resort near Libby
- Whitefish Mountain Resort near Whitefish

Big Sky Resort and Whitefish Mountain Resort are destination resorts, while the remaining areas do not have overnight lodging at the ski area, though several host restaurants and other amenities.

Montana also has millions of acres open to cross-country skiing on nine of its national forests and in Glacier National Park. In addition to cross-country trails at most of the downhill ski areas, there are also 13 private cross-country skiing resorts. Yellowstone National Park also allows cross-country skiing.

Snowmobiling is popular in Montana, which boasts over 4,000 miles of trails and frozen lakes available in winter. There are 24 areas where snowmobile trails are maintained, most also offering ungroomed trails. West Yellowstone offers a large selection of trails and is the primary starting point for snowmobile trips into Yellowstone National Park, where "oversnow" vehicle use is strictly limited, usually to guided tours, and regulations are in considerable flux.

Snow coach tours are offered at Big Sky, Whitefish, West Yellowstone and into Yellowstone National Park. Equestrian skijoring has a niche in Montana, which hosts the World Skijoring Championships in Whitefish as part of the annual Whitefish Winter Carnival.

== Health ==
Montana has two Trauma I hospitals, both in Billings. The Billings Clinic hospital became the first in Montana and neighboring Wyoming. In 2024, Intermountain Health's St. Vincent Regional Hospital also received verification. There are Trauma II hospitals in Missoula and Great Falls. In 2013, AARP The Magazine named the Billings Clinic one of the safest hospitals in the United States. In 2023, Billings Clinic united with Kalispell-based Logan Health Medical Center to form the largest Montana-based health system in the state, with coverage in all corners of the state and into Wyoming.

Montana is ranked as the least obese state in the U.S., at 19.6%, according to the 2014 Gallup Poll.

Montana had a suicide rate of 26.6 per 100,000 in 2023, which is the second highest of all the states in the U.S., only falling behind Alaska. High suicide rates are common among sparsely populated states in the United States.

== Media ==
As of 2010, Missoula is the 166th largest media market in the United States as ranked by Nielsen Media Research, while Billings is 170th, Great Falls is 190th, the Butte/Bozeman area is 191st, and Helena is 206th. There are 25 television stations in Montana, representing each major U.S. network. As of August 2013, there are 527 FCC-licensed FM radio stations broadcast in Montana, with 114 such AM stations.

During the age of the Copper Kings, each Montana copper company had its own newspaper. This changed in 1959 when Lee Enterprises bought several Montana newspapers. Montana's largest circulating daily city newspapers are the Billings Gazette (circulation 39,405), Great Falls Tribune (26,733), and Missoulian (25,439).

In May 2023, Montana became the first US state to ban the social media app TikTok and online marketplace Temu.

== Transportation ==
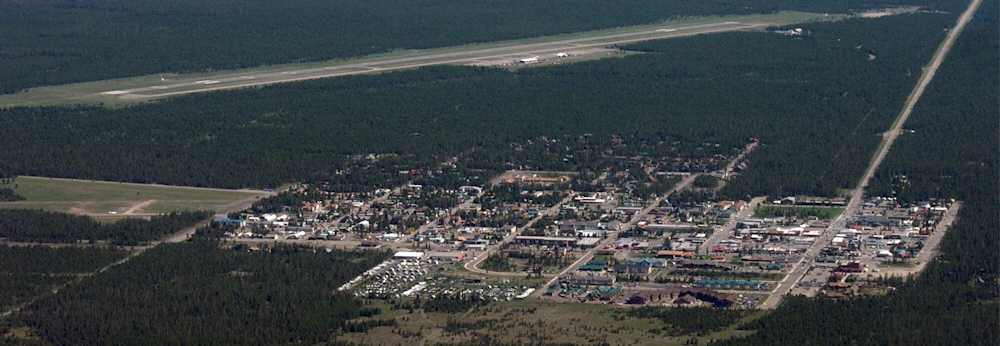
Yellowstone Airport, West Yellowstone, Montana

Railroads have been an important method of transportation in Montana since the 1880s. Historically, the state was traversed by the main lines of three east–west transcontinental routes: the Milwaukee Road, the Great Northern, and the Northern Pacific. Today, the BNSF Railway is the state's largest railroad, its main transcontinental route incorporating the former Great Northern main line across the state. Montana RailLink, a privately held Class II railroad, operated former Northern Pacific trackage in western Montana before being bought out by BNSF.

In addition, Amtrak's Empire Builder train runs through the north of the state, stopping in Libby, Whitefish, West Glacier, Essex, East Glacier Park, Browning, Cut Bank, Shelby, Havre, Malta, Glasgow, and Wolf Point.

Intercity bus service in Montana is provided by Jefferson Lines and Express Arrow.

Bozeman Yellowstone International Airport is the busiest airport in the state of Montana, surpassing Billings Logan International Airport in the spring of 2013. Montana's other major airports include Missoula International Airport, Great Falls International Airport, Glacier Park International Airport, Helena Regional Airport, Bert Mooney Airport, and Yellowstone Airport. Eight smaller communities have airports designated for commercial service under the Essential Air Service program.

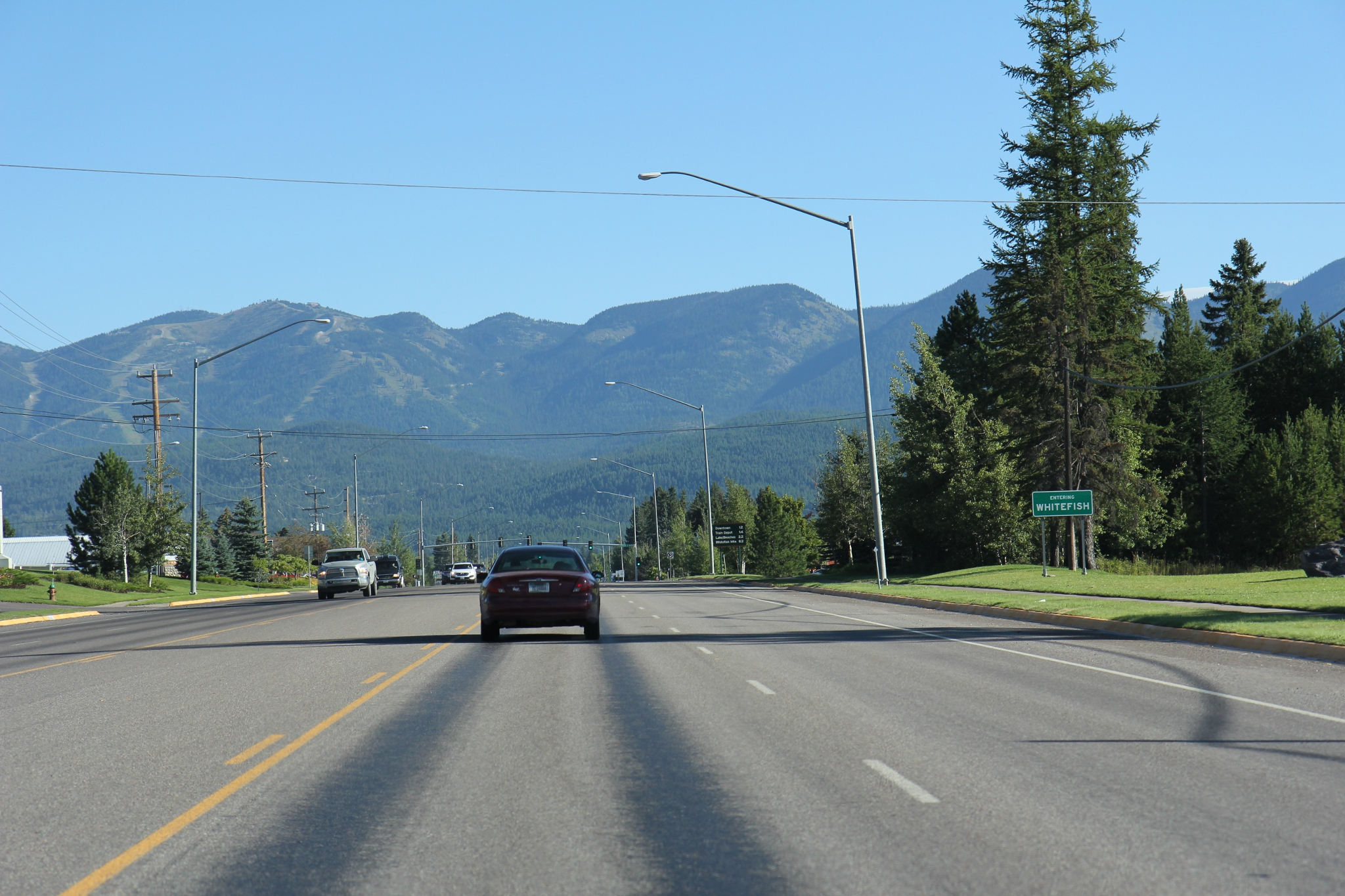
U.S. Route 93 in Montana

Historically, U.S. Route 10 was the primary east–west highway route across Montana, connecting the major cities in the southern half of the state. Still, the state's most important east–west travel corridor, the route is today served by Interstate 90 and Interstate 94 which roughly follow the same route as the Northern Pacific. U.S. Routes 2 and 12 and Montana Highway 200 also traverse the entire state from east to west.

Montana's only north–south Interstate Highway is Interstate 15. Other major north–south highways include U.S. Routes 87, 89, 93, and 191.

Montana and South Dakota are the only states to share a land border that is not traversed by a paved road. Highway 212, the primary paved route between the two, passes through the northeast corner of Wyoming between Montana and South Dakota.

== Law and government ==
=== Constitution ===
Montana is governed by a constitution. The first constitution was drafted by a constitutional convention in 1889, in preparation for statehood. Ninety percent of its language came from an 1884 constitution which was never acted upon by Congress for national political reasons. The 1889 constitution mimicked the structure of the United States Constitution, as well as outlining almost the same civil and political rights for citizens. However, the 1889 Montana constitution significantly restricted the power of state government, the legislature was much more powerful than the executive branch, and the jurisdiction of the District Courts very specifically described. Montana voters amended the 1889 constitution 37 times between 1889 and 1972. In 1914, Montana granted women the vote. In 1916, Montana became the first state to elect a woman, Progressive Republican Jeannette Rankin, to Congress.

In 1971, Montana voters approved the call for a state constitutional convention. A new constitution was drafted, which made the legislative and executive branches much more equal in power and which was much less prescriptive in outlining powers, duties, and jurisdictions. The draft included an expanded, more progressive list of civil and political rights, extended these rights to children for the first time, transferred administration of property taxes to the counties from the state, implemented new water rights, eliminated sovereign immunity, and gave the legislature greater power to spend tax revenues. The constitution was narrowly approved, 116,415 to 113,883, and declared ratified on June 20, 1972. Three issues that the constitutional convention was unable to resolve were submitted to voters simultaneously with the proposed constitution. Voters approved the legalization of gambling, a bicameral legislature, and retention of the death penalty.

The 1972 constitution has been amended 31 times as of 2015. Major amendments include establishment of a reclamation trust (funded by taxes on natural resource extraction) to restore mined land (1974); restoration of sovereign immunity, when such immunity has been approved by a two-thirds vote in each house (1974); establishment of a 90-day biennial (rather than annual) legislative session (1974); establishment of a coal tax trust fund, funded by a tax on coal extraction (1976); conversion of the mandatory decennial review of county government into a voluntary one, to be approved or disallowed by residents in each county (1978); conversion of the provision of public assistance from a mandatory civil right to a non-fundamental legislative prerogative (1988); a new constitutional right to hunt and fish (2004); a now-defunct prohibition on same-sex marriage (2004); a prohibition on new taxes on the sale or transfer of real property (2010), and a constitutional provision codifying abortion rights (2024). In 1992, voters approved a constitutional amendment implementing term limits for certain statewide elected executive branch offices (governor, lieutenant governor, secretary of state, state auditor, attorney general, superintendent of public instruction) and for members of the Montana Legislature. Extensive new constitutional rights for victims of crime were approved in 2016.

The 1972 constitution requires that voters determine every 20 years whether to hold a new constitutional convention. Voters turned down a new convention in 1990 (84 percent no) and again in 2010 (58.6 percent no).

=== Executive ===
Montana has three branches of state government: legislative, executive, and judicial. The executive branch is headed by an elected governor. The governor is Greg Gianforte, a Republican elected in 2020. There are also nine other statewide elected offices in the executive branch: Lieutenant Governor, Attorney General, Secretary of State, State Auditor (who also serves as Commissioner of Securities and Insurance), and Superintendent of Public Instruction. There are five public service commissioners, who are elected on a regional basis. (The Public Service Commission's jurisdiction is statewide.)

There are 18 departments and offices which make up the executive branch: Administration; Agriculture; Auditor (securities and insurance); Commerce; Corrections; Environmental Quality; Fish, Wildlife & Parks; Justice; Labor and Industry; Livestock; Military Affairs; Natural Resources and Conservation; Public Health and Human Services; Revenue; State; and Transportation. Elementary and secondary education are overseen by the Office of Public Instruction (led by the elected superintendent of public instruction), in cooperation with the governor-appointed Board of Public Education. Higher education is overseen by a governor-appointed Board of Regents, which in turn appoints a commissioner of higher education. The Office of the Commissioner of Higher Education acts in an executive capacity on behalf of the regents and oversees the state-run Montana University System.

Independent state agencies not within a department or office include the Montana Arts Council, Montana Board of Crime Control, Montana Historical Society, Montana Public Employees Retirement Administration, Commissioner of Political Practices, the Montana Lottery, Office of the State Public Defender, Public Service Commission, the Montana School for the Deaf and Blind, the Montana State Fund (which operates the state's unemployment insurance, worker compensation, and self-insurance operations), the Montana State Library, and the Montana Teachers Retirement System.

Montana is an alcoholic beverage control state. It is an equitable distribution and no-fault divorce state. It is one of five states to have no sales tax.

=== Legislative ===
The Montana Legislature is bicameral and consists of the 50-member Montana Senate and the 100-member Montana House of Representatives. The legislature meets in the Montana State Capitol in Helena in odd-numbered years for 90 days, beginning the first weekday of the year. The deadline for a legislator to introduce a general bill is the 40th legislative day. The deadline for a legislator to introduce an appropriations, revenue, or referendum bill is the 62nd legislative day. Senators serve four-year terms, while Representatives serve two-year terms. All members are limited to serving no more than eight years in a single 16-year period.

=== Judicial ===
The Courts of Montana are established by the Constitution of Montana. The constitution requires the establishment of a Montana Supreme Court and Montana District Courts, and permits the legislature to establish Justice Courts, City Courts, Municipal Courts, and other inferior courts such as the legislature sees fit to establish.

The Montana Supreme Court is the court of last resort in the Montana court system. The constitution of 1889 provided for the election of no fewer than three Supreme Court justices, and one chief justice. Each court member served a six-year term. The legislature increased the number of justices to five in 1919. The 1972 constitution lengthened the term of office to eight years and established the minimum number of justices at five. It allowed the legislature to increase the number of justices by two, which the legislature did in 1979. The Montana Supreme Court has the authority to declare acts of the legislature and executive unconstitutional under either the Montana or U.S. constitutions. Its decisions may be appealed directly to the U.S. Supreme Court. The Clerk of the Montana Supreme Court is also an elected position and serves a six-year term. Neither justices nor the clerk is term-limited.

Montana District Courts are the courts of general jurisdiction in Montana. There are no intermediate appellate courts. District Courts have jurisdiction primarily over most civil cases, cases involving a monetary claim against the state, felony criminal cases, probate, and cases at law and in equity. When so authorized by the legislature, actions of executive branch agencies may be appealed directly to a District Court. The District Courts also have de novo appellate jurisdiction from inferior courts (city courts, justice courts, and municipal courts), and oversee naturalization proceedings. District Court judges are elected and serve six-year terms. They are not term-limited. There are 22 judicial districts in Montana, served by 56 District Courts and 46 District Court judges. The District Courts suffer from excessive workload, and the legislature has struggled to find a solution to the problem.

Montana Youth Courts were established by the Montana Youth Court Act of 1974. They are overseen by District Court judges. They consist of a chief probation officer, one or more juvenile probation officers, and support staff. Youth Courts have jurisdiction over misdemeanor and felony acts committed by those charged as a juvenile under the law. There is a Youth Court in every judicial district, and decisions of the Youth Court are appealable directly to the Montana Supreme Court.

The Montana Worker's Compensation Court was established by the Montana Workers' Compensation Act in 1975. There is a single Workers' Compensation Court. It has a single judge, appointed by the governor. The Worker's Compensation Court has statewide jurisdiction and holds trials in Billings, Great Falls, Helena, Kalispell, and Missoula. The court hears cases arising under the Montana Workers' Compensation Act and is the court of original jurisdiction for reviews of orders and regulations issued by the Montana Department of Labor and Industry. Decisions of the court are appealable directly to the Montana Supreme Court.

The Montana Water Court was established by the Montana Water Court Act of 1979. The Water Court consists of a chief water judge and four district water judges (Lower Missouri River Basin, Upper Missouri River Basin, Yellowstone River Basin, and Clark Fork River Basin). The court employs 12 permanent special masters. The Montana Judicial Nomination Commission develops short lists of nominees for all five Water Judges, who are then appointed by the Chief justice of the Montana Supreme Court (subject to confirmation by the Montana Senate). The Water Court adjudicates water rights claims under the Montana Water Use Act of 1973 and has statewide jurisdiction. District Courts have the authority to enforce decisions of the Water Court, but only the Montana Supreme Court has the authority to review decisions of the Water Court.

From 1889 to 1909, elections for judicial office in Montana were partisan. Beginning in 1909, these elections became nonpartisan. The Montana Supreme Court struck down the nonpartisan law in 1911 on technical grounds, but a new law was enacted in 1935 which barred political parties from endorsing, making contributions to, or making expenditures on behalf of or against judicial candidates. In 2012, the U.S. Supreme Court struck down Montana's judicial nonpartisan election law in American Tradition Partnership, Inc. v. Bullock, 567 U.S. ____ (Sup.Ct. 2012).Although candidates must remain nonpartisan, spending by partisan entities is now permitted. Spending on state supreme court races exponentially increased to $1.6 million in 2014, and to more than $1.6 million in 2016 (both new records).

=== Federal offices and courts ===
The U.S. Constitution provides each state with two senators. Montana's two U.S. senators are Steve Daines, first elected in 2014 and later reelected in 2020, and Tim Sheehy, elected in 2024. Both are Republicans. The U.S. Constitution provides each state with a single representative, with additional representatives apportioned based on population. From statehood in 1889 until 1913, Montana was represented in the United States House of Representatives by a single representative, elected at-large. Montana received a second representative in 1913, following the 1910 census and reapportionment. Both members, however, were still elected at-large. Beginning in 1919, Montana moved to district, rather than at-large, elections for its two House members. This created Montana's 1st congressional district in the west and Montana's 2nd congressional district in the east.

Montana had only one representative in the U.S. House after having lost its second district in the 1990 census reapportionment. The remaining seat was again elected at-large. Montana's population grew at about the national average during the 2000s, but it had failed to regain its second seat in 2010. In the reapportionment following the 2020 census, Montana regained a House seat, increasing the state's number of representatives in the House to two after a thirty-year break, starting from 2023. Before the 2020 reapportionment, Montana's at-large congressional district held the largest population of any district in the country.

Republicans Troy Downing and Ryan Zinke are the current officeholders.

Montana's Senate district is the fourth largest by area, behind Alaska, Texas, and California. The most notorious of Montana's early senators was William A. Clark, a "Copper King" and one of the 50 richest Americans ever. He is well known for having bribed his way into the U.S. Senate. Among Montana's most historically prominent senators are Thomas J. Walsh (serving from 1913 to 1933), who was President-elect Franklin D. Roosevelt's choice for attorney general when he died; Burton K. Wheeler (serving from 1923 to 1947), an oft-mentioned presidential candidate and strong supporter of isolationism; Mike Mansfield, the longest-serving Senate majority leader in U.S. history; Max Baucus (served 1978 to 2014), longest-serving U.S. senator in Montana history, and the senator who shepherded the Patient Protection and Affordable Care Act through the Senate in 2010; and Lee Metcalf (served 1961 to 1978), a pioneer of the environmental movement.

Montana's House district is the largest congressional district in the United States by population, with just over 1,023,000 constituents. It is the second-largest House district by area, after Alaska's at-large congressional district. Of Montana's House delegates, Jeannette Rankin was the first woman to hold national office in the United States when she was elected to the U.S. House of Representatives in 1916. Also notable is Representative (later Senator) Thomas H. Carter, the first Catholic to serve as chairman of the Republican National Committee (from 1892 to 1896).

Federal courts in Montana include the United States District Court for the District of Montana and the United States Bankruptcy Court for the District of Montana. Three former Montana politicians have been named judges on the U.S. District Court: Charles Nelson Pray (who served in the U.S. House of Representatives from 1907 to 1913), James F. Battin (who served in the U.S. House of Representatives from 1961 to 1969), and Paul G. Hatfield (who served as an appointed U.S. Senator in 1978). Brian Morris, who served as an associate justice of the Montana Supreme Court from 2005 to 2013, currently serves as a judge on the court.

== Politics ==
Treemap of the popular vote by county in the 2016 presidential election. Areas are in proportion to the number of votes cast in each county.

Elections in the state had been historically competitive, particularly for state-level offices. Historically, the Democratic Party's strength in the state was gained from support among unionized miners and railroad workers, while farmers generally voted Republican. Republicans have been strongest in the east, while Democrats have been strongest in the west.

Montana had a history of voters splitting their tickets and filling elected offices with individuals from both parties. Through the mid-20th century, the state had a tradition of "sending the liberals to Washington and the conservatives to Helena". Between 1988 and 2006, the pattern flipped, with voters more likely to elect conservatives to federal offices. There have also been long-term shifts in party control. From 1968 through 1988, the state was dominated by the Democratic Party, with Democratic governors for a 20-year period, and a Democratic majority of both the national congressional delegation and during many sessions of the state legislature. This pattern shifted, beginning with the 1988 election when Montana elected a Republican governor for the first time since 1964 and sent a Republican to the U.S. Senate for the first time since 1948. This shift continued with the reapportionment of the state's legislative districts that took effect in 1994, when the Republican Party took control of both chambers of the state legislature, consolidating a Republican party dominance that lasted until the 2004 reapportionment produced more swing districts and a brief period of Democratic legislative majorities in the mid-2000s.

At the federal level, the pattern of split-ticket voting and divided government endured until Democratic U.S. Senator Jon Tester lost reelection in 2024, subsequently ceding his seat on January 3, 2025, thereby leaving Montana with no Democratic statewide officeholders.

United States presidential election results for Montana
Year	Republican		Democratic		Third party(ies)	
Year	No.	%	No.	%	No.	%
1892	18,871	42.44%	17,690	39.79%	7,900	17.77%
1896	10,509	19.71%	42,628	79.93%	193	0.36%
1900	25,409	39.79%	37,311	58.43%	1,136	1.78%
1904	34,932	54.21%	21,773	33.79%	7,739	12.01%
1908	32,333	46.98%	29,326	42.61%	7,163	10.41%
1912	18,512	23.19%	27,941	35.00%	33,373	41.81%
1916	66,750	37.57%	101,063	56.88%	9,866	5.55%
1920	109,430	61.13%	57,372	32.05%	12,204	6.82%
1924	74,138	42.50%	33,805	19.38%	66,480	38.11%
1928	113,300	58.37%	78,578	40.48%	2,230	1.15%
1932	78,078	36.07%	127,286	58.80%	11,115	5.13%
1936	63,598	27.59%	159,690	69.28%	7,224	3.13%
1940	99,579	40.17%	145,698	58.78%	2,596	1.05%
1944	93,163	44.93%	112,556	54.28%	1,636	0.79%
1948	96,770	43.15%	119,071	53.09%	8,437	3.76%
1952	157,394	59.39%	106,213	40.07%	1,430	0.54%
1956	154,933	57.13%	116,238	42.87%	0	0.00%
1960	141,841	51.10%	134,891	48.60%	847	0.31%
1964	113,032	40.57%	164,246	58.95%	1,350	0.48%
1968	138,835	50.60%	114,117	41.59%	21,452	7.82%
1972	183,976	57.93%	120,197	37.85%	13,430	4.23%
1976	173,703	52.84%	149,259	45.40%	5,772	1.76%
1980	206,814	56.82%	118,032	32.43%	39,106	10.74%
1984	232,450	60.47%	146,742	38.18%	5,185	1.35%
1988	190,412	52.07%	168,936	46.20%	6,326	1.73%
1992	144,207	35.12%	154,507	37.63%	111,897	27.25%
1996	179,652	44.11%	167,922	41.23%	59,687	14.66%
2000	240,178	58.44%	137,126	33.36%	33,693	8.20%
2004	266,063	59.07%	173,710	38.56%	10,672	2.37%
2008	243,882	49.49%	232,159	47.11%	16,709	3.39%
2012	267,928	55.30%	201,839	41.66%	14,717	3.04%
2016	279,240	55.65%	177,709	35.41%	44,873	8.94%
2020	343,602	56.92%	244,786	40.55%	15,286	2.53%
2024	352,079	58.39%	231,906	38.46%	19,005	3.15%

Montana has voted for the Republican nominee in all but two presidential elections since 1952. The state last supported a Democrat for president in 1992, when Bill Clinton won a plurality victory. The state is somewhat less Republican than its neighboring states (Idaho, Wyoming, South Dakota, and North Dakota), all of which last supported a Democratic presidential candidate in 1964.

In the 2008 presidential election, Montana was considered a swing state and was ultimately won by Republican John McCain by a narrow margin of two percent. The two chambers of the state's legislature had split party control from 2004 to 2010, when that year's mid-term elections decisively returned both branches to Republican control.

The state's congressional seats (now two districts, but until 2023, one at-large district) have been Republican since 1996, and its Senate seats have been held by Republicans Steve Daines since 2015 and Tim Sheehy since 2025.

The Montana Senate is controlled by Republicans 32 to 18, and the Montana House of Representatives also holds a 57 to 43 Republican majority following the 2024 Montana elections which saw Democrats break the Republican supermajority in the House aided by independent redistricting.

In a 2020 study, Montana was ranked as the 21st easiest state for citizens to vote in.

== See also ==
- Index of Montana-related articles
- List of the oldest buildings in Montana
- Outline of Montana
- Timeline of Montana history

== Bibliography ==
- Archibald, J. David (1997), "I. Extinction, Cretaceous", in Currie, Philip J.; Padian, Kevin (eds.), Encyclopedia of Dinosaurs, San Diego, Calif.: Academic Press, pp. 221–230, ISBN 978-0-12-226810-6
- Aarstad, Rich; Arguimbau, Ellen; Baumler, Ellen; Porsild, Charlene (2009). Montana Place Names From Alzada to Zortman. Helena, MT: Montana Historical Society Press. ISBN 978-0-9759196-1-3.
- Anderson, Donald (2012). Gathering Noise From My Life: A Camouflaged Memoir. Iowa City, IA: University of Iowa Press. p. 4. ISBN 978-1-60938-111-0.
- Avery, Jonathan E.; Siebeneck, Todd P.; Tate, Robert P. (July 2011). "Gross Domestic Product by State – Advance Statistics for 2010 and Revised Statistics for 2007–2009" (PDF). Bureau of Economic Analysis. Archived from the original (PDF) on September 24, 2012.
- Bacaj, Jason (January 29, 2013). "Billings Logan International Remains Busiest in Montana". Bozeman Daily Chronicle. Archived from the original on January 18, 2017.
- Backus, Perry (July 31, 2005). "Beetles Shaping Montana's Forest Lands". The Missoulian. Archived from the original on January 18, 2017.
- Backus, Perry (February 14, 2007). "Forest Service Finds Varied Beetle Activity". The Missoulan. Archived from the original on January 18, 2017.
- Ballantyne, Keira G.; Rasmussen, Mari B. (February 2011). "Resources for Working With the Indigenous Languages of North America and the Pacific Islands" (PDF). National Clearinghouse for English Language Acquisition, George Washington University.
- Ballard, Jack (2008). Elk Hunting Montana: Finding Success on the Best Public Lands. Guildford, Conn.: Lyons Press. ISBN 978-1-59921-154-1.
- Beaver, Janice Cheryl (2006). "U.S. International Borders: Brief Facts" (PDF). Washington, D.C.: Congressional Research Service. Archived (PDF) from the original on April 1, 2019.
- Bergman, Brian (March 23, 2004). "Bison Back from Brink of Extinction". Maclean's. Archived from the original on September 1, 2007.
- Boswell, Evelyn (October 5, 2006). "New Stegner Professor to Hit the Ground Running". Montana State University News Service. Archived from the original on August 20, 2007.
- Brittingham, Angela; de la Cruz, G. Patricia (June 2004). "Ancestry 2000 (C2KBR-35)" (PDF). United States Bureau of the Census. Archived from the original (PDF) on September 20, 2004.
- Burger, H. Robert (2004). "General Geology and Tectonic Settong of the Tobacco Root Mountains. Special Paper 377.". In John Brady; Charles J. Vitaliano; William S. Cordua (eds.). Precambrian Geology of the Tobacco Root Mountains, Montana. Boulder, Colo.: Geological Society of America. pp. 1–14. ISBN 978-0-8137-2377-8.
- Cooper, Ed (2009). Soul of the Rockies-Portrait of America's Largest Mountain Range. Guilford, CT: Globe Pequot Press. ISBN 978-0-7627-4941-6.
- Cunningham, Bill (1990). Montana Wildlands: From Northwest Peaks to Deadhorse Badlands. Helena, Mont.: Farcountry Press. ISBN 978-0-938314-93-6.
- "Cyaniding at Gilt Edge, Montana". Mining and Scientific Press. October 7, 1899.
- Diamond, Jared (2006). Collapse: How Societies Choose to Fail or Succeed. New York: Penguin Books. ISBN 978-0-670-03337-9.
- Elias, Scott (2002). Rocky Mountains. Washington, D.C.: Smithsonian Institution Press. ISBN 978-1-58834-042-9.
- Elison, Larry M.; Snyder, Fritz (2001). The Montana State Constitution: A Reference Guide. Westport, Conn.: Greenwood Press. ISBN 9780313273469.
- Enright, Kelly (2010). America's Natural Places: Rocky Mountains and Great Plains. Santa Barbara, Calif.: Greenwood Press/ABC-CLIO. ISBN 978-0-313-35314-7.
- Fanselow, Julie (2007). Traveling the Lewis and Clark Trail. Guilford, CT: Falcon Guides. ISBN 978-0-7627-4437-4.
- Finnerty, Jim (2011). A Pleasant Stroll to Everest. Bloomington, Ind.: Xlibris Corp. ISBN 978-1-4628-4928-4.
- Fischer, Hank; Fischer, Carol (2008). Paddling Montana. Guildford, CT: FalconGuides. ISBN 978-0-7627-4352-0.
- Fisher, Cassius A. (1908). Geology and Water Resources of the Great Falls Region, Montana. Water-Supply Paper No. 221. Washington, D.C.: U.S. Geological Survey.
- Fletcher, Robert H.; Bradshaw, Glenda Clay; Axline, Jon; Shope, Irvin (2008). Montana's Historical Highway Markers. Helena, Mont.: Montana Historical Society. ISBN 978-0-917298-31-8.
- Florence, Mason; Nystrom, Andrew Dean; Gierlich, Marisa (2001). Rocky Mountain States. London: Lonely Planet. ISBN 978-1-86450-327-2.
- Foner, Philip S. (1987). Labor and World War I, 1914–1918. Vol. 7. New York: International Publishers. ISBN 978-0-7178-0638-6.
- French, Brett (March–April 2002). "A Good Time in Montana's Badlands". Montana Outdoors. Archived from the original on April 23, 2013.
- French, Brett (July 29, 2009). "Forecast: More Air Pollution, Study Predicts Global Warming Will Increase Fires in Northern Rockies". Billings Gazette. Archived from the original on September 3, 2010.
- Graetz, Rick; Clemenz, Bob (1984). Beautiful Montana. Wilsonville, OR: Beautiful America Publishing. ISBN 978-0-915796-25-0.
- Gravlee, Sarah (January 3, 2012). "Montana Reaches One Million Mark". kulr8.com. KULR-8 Television.
- Hanna, Warren L. (1988). "James Willard Schultz-The Pikuni Storyteller". Stars Over Montana-Men Who Made Glacier National Park History. West Glacier, MT: Glacier Natural History Association. ISBN 978-0-09-167906-4.
- Heilprin, Angelo; Heilprin, Louis, eds. (1900), "Clark's (Clarke's) River, Flathead River", Geographical Dictionary Of The World In The Early 20th Century With Pronouncing Gazetteer, vol. 1, A to L, Philadelphia, Pa.: J. B. Lippincott, p. 423
- Hellman, Paul T. (2013). Historical Gazetteer of the United States. Florence, Ky.: Routledge. ISBN 978-1-135-94859-7.
- Holden, Stephen (March 29, 2002). "The Slaughter Rule (2002)". The New York Times. Archived from the original on May 9, 2022.
- Holmes, Krys (2009). Montana: Stories of the Land. Helena, Montana: Montana Historical Society Press. ISBN 978-0-9759196-3-7. Archived from the original on January 17, 2024.
- Howard, Beth. "Top Hospitals for Safety". AARP the Magazine (April–May 2013).
- Howard, Joseph Kinsey (1959). Montana-High, Wide and Handsome. New Haven, CT: Yale University Press. ISBN 978-0-8032-7339-9
- Horvitz, Andrew H.; Stephens, Scott; Helfert, Michael; Goodge, Grant; Redmond, Kelly T.; Pomeroy, Ken; Purdy, Ed (2002). "A National Temperature Record at Loma, Montana" (PDF). American Meteorological Society. Archived (PDF) from the original on February 25, 2006.
- Hoxie, Frederick E. (1995). Parading Through History. The making of the Crow Nation in America, 1805-1935. New York, New York: Cambridge University Press. ISBN 978-0-521-48057-4.
- Hurlbut, Brian; Davis, Seabring (2009). Insiders' Guide to Yellowstone and Grand Teton. Globe Pequot. ISBN 978-0-7627-5041-2.
- Huser, Verne (2004). On the River With Lewis and Clark. College Station, Tex.: Texas A&M University Press. ISBN 978-1-58544-320-8.
- Jewell, Judy; McRae, Bill (2012). Moon Montana. Berkeley, Calif.: Avalon Travel. ISBN 978-1-61238-262-3.
- Johnson, James W. (Body) (July 4, 1966). "The Fight That Won't Stay Dead". Sports Illustrated.
- Kappler, Charles J. (1904). Indian Affairs. Laws and Treaties. Vol. 2. Washington, D.C.: U.S. Government Printing Office.
- Kaush, Arha; Thompson, Barton H. Jr. (2012). The Endangered Species Act and Federalism: Effective Conservation Through Greater State Commitment (2 ed.). Routledge. ISBN 978-1-58592-042-6.
- Kittredge, William; Krauzer, Steven M. (Autumn 1986). "'Mr. Montana' Revised: Another Look at Granville Stuart". Montana: The Magazine of Western History. 36 (4): 14–23. JSTOR 4519007.
- Kudray, Gregory M.; Cooper, Steven V. (2006). "Montana's Rocky Mountain Front: Vegetation Map and Type Descriptions. Report to the United States Fish and Wildlife Service" (PDF). Helena, MT: Montana Natural Heritage Program.
- Kugler, Eileen Gale (2013). Innovative Voices in Education: What It Takes to Engage Diverse Communities. Lanham, MD: Rowman & Littlefield Education. ISBN 978-1-61048-539-5.
- Lewis, M. Paul; Simons, Gary F.; Fennig, Charles D. (2013). "Ethnologue: Languages of the World". SIL International. Archived from the original on October 13, 2011.
- Libecap, Gary D.; Hansen, Zeynep Kocabiyik (March 2002). ""Rain Follows the Plow" and Dryfarming Doctrine: The Climate Information Problem and Homestead Failure in the Upper Great Plains, 1890–1925". Journal of Economic History. 62 (1): 86–120. JSTOR 2697973.
- Lincoln, Marga (April 19, 2012). "Montana Shakespeare Company Finds New Home at Helena Civic Center". Helena Independent Record. Archived from the original on January 18, 2017.
- Lubetkin, M. John (2006). Jay Cooke's Gamble-The Northern Pacific Railroad, The Sioux, and the Panic of 1873. Norman, OK: University of Oklahoma Press. ISBN 978-0-8061-3740-7.
- Lux, Mabel (1964). "Honyockers of Harlem-Honyockers of Zurich". In Kennedy, Michael S. (ed.). Cowboys and Cattlemen-A Roundup of Montana, The Magazine of Western History. New York: Hastings House. pp. 333–348.
- Madej, Ed; Jones, Cedron (September 14, 2007). "Mountain Ranges of Montana" (PDF). Natural Resource Information System. Montana State Library. Archived from the original (PDF) on May 15, 2013.
- Malone, Michael P.; Roeder, Richard B.; Lang, William L. (1976). "Montana Territory". Montana: A History of Two Centuries. Seattle: University of Washington Press. ISBN 978-0-295-95520-9.
- Malone, Michael P.; Roeder, Richard B.; Lang, William L. (1991). Montana: A History of Two Centuries. Seattle: University of Washington Press. ISBN 978-0-295-97129-2.
- Matzko, John (2001). Reconstructing Fort Union. Lincoln, NE: University of Nebraska Press. ISBN 978-0-8032-3216-7.
- McDean, Harry C. (January 1, 1986). "Dust Bowl Historiography". Great Plains Quarterly. Archived from the original on February 9, 2014.
- McKee, Jennifer (August 27, 2007). "UM Climate Expert Says Triple-digit Julys Will Be Norm". Billings Gazette. Archived from the original on January 18, 2017.
- Merrill-Maker, Andrea (2006). "Natural Treasures". Montana Almanac-The First, Best Source for Information About Big Sky Country. Guildford, CT: Globe Pequot Press. ISBN 978-0-7627-3655-3.
- Milner II, Clyde A.; O'Connor, Carol A. (2009). As Big as the West: The Pioneer Life of Granville Stuart. Oxford: Oxford University Press. ISBN 978-0-19-512709-6.
- Moody, David W.; Chase, Edith B.; Aronson, David A. (1986). National Water Summary—1985: Hydrologic Events and Surface-Water Resources. U.S. Geological Survey Water-Supply Paper 2300. Washington, D.C.: U.S. Government Printing Office.
- Morris, Patrick F. (1997). Anaconda, Montana: Copper Smelting Boom Town on the Western Frontier. Burnet, TX: Swann Publishing. ISBN 978-0-9657209-2-2.
- Murphy, Paul L. (1980). "Montana's Agony: Years of War and Hysteria, 1917–1921". The Journal of American History. 67 (2): 436. doi:10.2307/1890476. JSTOR 1890476.
- Naiman, Robert J.; Décamps, Henri; McClain, Michael E. (2005). Riparia: Ecology, Conservation, and Management of Streamside Communities. Boston: Elsevier Academic. ISBN 978-0-12-663315-3.
- Norris, Tina; Vines, Paula L.; Hoeffel, Elizabeth M. (January 2012). "The American Indian and Alaska Native Population: 2010" (PDF). United States Bureau of the Census. Archived (PDF) from the original on May 5, 2012.
- O'Brien, Mary (2003). Days on the Road: Crossing the Plains in 1865, The Diary of Sarah Raymond Herndon. Morris Books Publishing. ISBN 978-0-7627-2581-6.
- Ottum, Bob (January 29, 1968). "Bold Bourkey For John Misha". Sports Illustrated. Archived from the original on October 12, 2009.
- Palmer, Tim (1998). America By Rivers. Washington, D.C.: Island Press. ISBN 978-1-59726-912-4.
- Parry, Ellis Roberts (2001). Montana Dateline. Guilford, Conn.: TwoDot Press. ISBN 978-1-56044-956-0.
- Peavey, Linda; Smith, Ursula (2008). Full-Court Quest. Norman, OK: University of Oklahoma Press. Reviewed by Nykolaiszyn, Juliana M. (Summer–Fall 2011). "Full-Court Quest". Oral History Review. 38 (2): 420–422. doi:10.1093/ohr/ohr087. S2CID 160257569.
- Peterson, Eric (2012). Frommer's Montana and Wyoming. Hoboken, N.J.: John Wiley & Sons. ISBN 978-0-470-59150-5.
- Robbins, Chuck (2008). Great Places Montana: A Recreational Guide to Montana's Public Lands and Historic Places for Birding, Hiking, Photography, Fishing, Hunting, and Camping. Belgrade, MT: Wilderness Adventures Press. ISBN 978-1-932098-59-4.
- Robbins, Jim (August 17, 2008). "In Montana, a Popular Expression Is Taken Off the Endangered List". The New York Times. Archived from the original on February 9, 2014.
- Ross, Clyde P. (1959). Geology of Glacier National Park and the Flathead Region, Northwestern Montana. Geological Survey Professional Paper 296. Washington, D.C.: U.S. Government Printing Office.
- Sanders, Wilbur Edgerton (1910). "Montana, Organization, Name and Naming: The Word, its Significance, Derivation, and Historical Use". Contributions to the Historical Society of Montana. Vol. 7. Helena, MT: Rocky Mountain Publishing.
- Ruckman, Shannon (May 11, 2007). "Overcast tune named official Montana lullaby". Prairie Star. Archived from the original on January 18, 2017.
- Scandale, Maria (August 18, 2011). "93rd Annual Crow Fair Celebration Under the Big Sky". Indian Country Today Media Network.
- Schontzler, Gail (January 23, 2011). "Nelson Story—Hero, Scoundrel Legend". Bozeman Daily Chronicle. Archived from the original on January 18, 2017.
- Schullery, Paul (2006). "Fly Fishing in Western Culture". Cowboy Trout-Western Fly Fishing As If It Matters. Helena, MT: Montana Historical Society Press. ISBN 978-0-9721522-7-3.
- Schullery, Paul (2006). "A River Runs Through It as Folklore and History". Cowboy Trout-Western Fly Fishing As If It Matters. Helena, MT: Montana Historical Society Press. ISBN 978-0-9721522-7-3.
- Sites, Phillip (January 19, 2012). "Most Remote State Borders". The Weekend Roady. Archived from the original on February 2, 2014.
- Spracklen, D. V.; Mickley, L. J.; Logan, J. A; Hudman, R. C.; Yevich, R.; Flannigan, M. D.; Westerling, A. L. (October 27, 2009). "Impacts of Climate Change From 2000 to 2050 on Wildfire Activity and Carbonaceous Aerosol Concentrations in the Western United States" (PDF). Journal of Geophysical Research. 114 (D20): D20301. Bibcode:2009JGRD..11420301S. doi:10.1029/2008JD010966. Archived from the original (PDF) on July 19, 2011.
- Stephens, Patia. "When Speech Wasn't Free". Montanan (Fall 2006). Archived from the original on April 24, 2013.
- Stuart, Mabel Lewis (July 17, 1913). "The Lady Honyocker-How Girls Take Up Claim and Make Their Homes on the Prairie". The Independent. LXXV (3372).
- Temple, Robert D. (2006). Edge Effects: The Border-Name Places. New York: iUniverse. ISBN 978-0-595-50433-6.
- Therriault, Ednor (2010). Montana Curiosities: Quirky Characters, Roadside Oddities & Other Offbeat Stuff. Guildford, CT: Globe Pequot Press. ISBN 978-0-7627-6572-0.
- Tode, Laura (March 7, 2004). "Amish Call Montana Home". Independent Record. Archived from the original on January 18, 2017.
- Toole, K. Ross (1959). Montana: An Uncommon Land. Norman: University of Oklahoma Press. ISBN 978-0-8061-1890-1
- Swanson, Larry (December 2004). "Economics". Montana Fish, Wildlife and Parks. Archived from the original on April 29, 2013.
- Thackeray, Lorna (October 17, 2009). "National-park visitors boost Montana's tourism stats". Billings Gazette. Archived from the original on September 8, 2011.
- United States Forest Service (2007). Final Environmental Impact Statement: Little Belt, Castle, and North Half Crazy Mountains Travel Management Plan. Washington, D.C.: U.S. Department of the Interior.
- Vasapolli, Salvatore (2003). Montana. Portland, Ore.: Graphic Arts Center Pub. ISBN 978-1-55868-696-0.
- Werner, Bret; Welply, Michael (2006). First Special Service Force 1942–44. Oxford: Osprey Publishing. ISBN 978-1-84176-968-4.
- Work, Clemens P. (2005). Darkest Before Dawn: Sedition and Free Speech in the American West. Albuquerque: University of New Mexico Press. ISBN 978-0-8263-3793-1.
- "1889 Spokane Wins!". Kentucky Derby. Archived from the original on May 3, 2013.
- "2008 Election Results". CNN. 2008. Archived from the original on November 7, 2008.
- "2010 Census Redistricting Data Summary File, Table P1" (CSV). United States Bureau of the Census. March 15, 2011. Archived from the original on October 6, 2015.
- "2012/2013 Hunting Regulations". Montana Fish, Wildlife and Parks. Archived from the original on April 24, 2013.
- "About Shakespeare in the Parks". Montana Shakespeare in the Parks. Archived from the original on June 9, 2013.
- "About the State Seal". Montana Secretary of State. Archived from the original on February 5, 2009.
- "AM Query Results". Federal Communications Commission. Archived from the original on May 9, 2022.
- "Annual Estimates of the Population for the United States, Regions, States, and Puerto Rico: April 1, 2010 to July 1, 2012". 2012 Population Estimates. Census Bureau. December 2012. Archived from the original (CSV) on February 5, 2009.
- "Annual Estimates of the Resident Population by Sex, Race, and Hispanic Origin for the United States, States, and Counties: April 1, 2010 to July 1, 2012". United States Bureau of the Census. 2012.
- "About Liquor Licensing". Montana Department of Revenue. April 19, 2013. Archived from the original on April 28, 2013.
- "Antipodes: The Other Side of the World". Peakbagger. Archived from the original on April 12, 2013.
- "Biography of Governor Judy Martz". Montana Governor. Archived from the original on May 3, 2013.
- "Bozeman Airport now the Busiest in Montana". KTVQ. June 17, 2013. Archived from the original on July 22, 2013.
- "Bozeman Cemetery". Ultimate Montana — New Times Media. Archived from the original on May 22, 2013.
- "Bridger Bowl, Bozeman Montana ~ Vacation Planning". Bridger Bowl. 2011. Archived from the original on April 17, 2013.
- "Brief History of Montana". State of Montana. Archived from the original on December 27, 2013.
- "Butte-Anaconda Historic District" (PDF). National Park Service. March 21, 2006. Archived from the original (PDF) on November 11, 2013.
- "Census 2010–20 Largest Montana Cities, Counties". KRTV. December 21, 2010. Archived from the original on May 29, 2013.
- "Climate in Montana". Animal Range and Sciences Extension Service, Montana State University. Archived from the original on February 6, 2012.
- "Climate of 2007—July in Historical Perspective". National Climatic Data Center. National Oceanic and Atmospheric Administration. August 15, 2007. Archived from the original on April 24, 2013.
- "Climate Information". Montana Department of Tourism. 2007. Archived from the original on October 29, 2013.
- "Climate of Montana". Desert Research Institute, Western Regional Climate Center. Archived from the original on September 26, 2007.
- "Congressional Delegation". State of Montana. Archived from the original on May 3, 2013.
- "Congressional Globe, 38th Congress, 1st session". Library of Congress. March 17, 1864. Archived from the original on December 6, 2013.
- "Continental Divides in North Dakota and North America". National Atlas, Department of the Interior. January 14, 2013. Archived from the original on May 13, 2008.
- "Council Grove" (PDF). Montana Office of Public Instruction. January 2010. Archived from the original (PDF) on December 29, 2013.
- "Cross-Country Skiing in Montana". Winter Montana. Montana Office of Tourism. 2010. Archived from the original on April 24, 2013.
- "Cross Country Skiing and Snowshoeing in Yellowstone — Yellowstone National Park". National Park Service. March 28, 2013. Archived from the original on December 21, 2012.
- "Current List of Eligible EAS Communities". Department of Transportation. Archived from the original on January 1, 2014.
- "Davis Finds Joy, Value in Being Technical Specialist". Ice Network. January 20, 2012. Archived from the original on January 14, 2014.
- "Daily Newspapers". Archived from the original on August 17, 2014.
- "Demographic and Economic Profile: Montana" (PDF). Rural Policy Research Institute. 2006. Archived from the original (PDF) on August 19, 2016.
- "Detailed Waterbody Report-Bighorn River". Montana Fish, Wildlife and Parks. Archived from the original on March 29, 2013.
- "Detailed Waterbody Report-Boulder River". Montana Fish, Wildlife and Parks. Archived from the original on March 29, 2013.
- "Detailed Waterbody Report-Clark Fork River". Montana Fish, Wildlife and Parks. Archived from the original on March 29, 2013.
- "Detailed Waterbody Report-Clarks Fork of the Yellowstone". Montana Fish, Wildlife and Parks. Archived from the original on March 29, 2013.
- "Detailed Waterbody Report-Judith River". Montana Fish, Wildlife and Parks. Archived from the original on February 10, 2014.
- "Detailed Waterbody Report-Kootenai River". Montana Fish, Wildlife and Parks. Archived from the original on February 10, 2014.
- "Detailed Waterbody Report-Marias River". Montana Fish, Wildlife and Parks. Archived from the original on March 29, 2013.
- "Detailed Waterbody Report-Milk River". Montana Fish, Wildlife and Parks. Archived from the original on March 29, 2013.
- "Detailed Waterbody Report-Musselshell River". Montana Fish, Wildlife and Parks. Archived from the original on March 29, 2013.
- "Detailed Waterbody Report-Powder River". Montana Fish, Wildlife and Parks. Archived from the original on March 29, 2013.
- "Detailed Waterbody Report-Smith River". Montana Fish, Wildlife and Parks. Archived from the original on March 29, 2013.
- "Detailed Waterbody Report-Stillwater River". Montana Fish, Wildlife and Parks. Archived from the original on March 29, 2013.
- "Detailed Waterbody Report-Tongue River". Montana Fish, Wildlife and Parks. Archived from the original on March 29, 2013.
- "Dry Farming in the North Central Montana "Triangle"". Montana State University Extension Service. Archived from the original on December 24, 2013.
- "Economic Sectors". Governor's Office of Economic Development. Archived from the original on April 1, 2013.
- "Elevations and Distances in the United States". United States Geological Survey. 2001. Archived from the original on October 15, 2011.
- "FAQ". Montana Office of Tourism. Archived from the original on July 1, 2013.
- "FM Query Results". Federal Communications Commission.
- "Football" (PDF). Montana High School Association.
- "Fort Benton". National Historic Landmark Program. November 5, 1961. Archived from the original on April 13, 2008.
- "Fort Peck Today". Fort Peck. Archived from the original on January 21, 2013.
- "Frontier Conference Members". Frontier Conference. Archived from the original on May 9, 2013.
- "Glacier Monitoring Research". Monitoring and Assessing Glacier Changes and Their Associated Hydrologic and Ecologic Effects in Glacier National Park. United States Geological Survey. Archived from the original on February 18, 2013.
- "Granite Peak". National Geodetic Survey. 2008. Archived from the original on December 6, 2013.
- "Grant-Kohrs Ranch National Historic Site — Cowboys and Cattlemen". National Park Service. April 9, 2013. Archived from the original on December 14, 2013.
- "Grant-Kohrs Ranch — People". National Park Service. March 22, 2013. Archived from the original on December 14, 2013.
- "Granville Stuart" (PDF). Montana Historical Society. Archived (PDF) from the original on December 16, 2013.
- "GNAC Permanent Members". Great Northwest Athletic Conference. 2013. Archived from the original on March 6, 2013.
- "Great Seal, Montana Code Annotated: 1-1-501". Montana Legislative Services. 2011. Archived from the original on May 7, 2013.
- "Hellgate Treaty" (PDF). Confederate Salish Kootenai Tribes. 1855. Archived from the original (PDF) on September 3, 2013.
- "Highest Circulation Montana Newspapers". Mondo Times. Archived from the original on May 9, 2022.
- "History and Preservation — The Montana Historical Society: Montana's Museum". Montana Department of Tourism. Archived from the original on May 30, 2013.
- "History of Lee".
- "History of Malmstrom Air Force Base". Malmstrom Air Force Base. Archived from the original on February 21, 2013.
- "Hmong Qeej Music: Tou Yang — Mai K. Moua, Missoula". From the Heart and Hand. Montana Arts Council. Archived from the original on October 1, 2013.
- "Hunting-Season Dates". Montana Fish, Wildlife and Parks. Archived from the original on March 28, 2013.
- "Indian Education for All – Montana Indians: Their History and Location" (PDF). Montana Office of Public Instruction. April 2009. Archived from the original (PDF) on February 2, 2013.
- "I.W.W. Strike Chief Lynched At Butt" (PDF). The New York Times. August 2, 1917. Archived (PDF) from the original on February 24, 2021.
- "Jack Horner". Great Falls Tribune. Archived from the original on January 24, 2012.
- "Jeannette Rankin". Women's Hall of Fame. Great Women. 2011. Archived from the original on October 29, 2013.
- "John Misha Petkevich Bio, Stats, and Results". Sports Reference. 2013. Archived from the original on April 18, 2020.
- "Language Map Data Center". Modern Language Association. July 17, 2007. Archived from the original on May 24, 2013.
- "Local Television Market Universe Estimates" (PDF). September 25, 2010. Archived from the original (PDF) on August 9, 2013.
- "Montana". National Park Service. March 15, 2013. Archived from the original on March 30, 2013.
- "Montana". United States Department of Labor—Bureau of Labor Statistics. December 30, 2014. Archived from the original on January 11, 2015.
- "Montana". Census Bureau. October 18, 2012. Archived from the original on April 12, 2013.
- "Montana 2012 Election". 270towin. 2013. Archived from the original on April 25, 2013.
- "Montana Access Guide to State and Federal Lands" (PDF). Montana Interagency Access Council. August 1, 2001. Archived from the original (PDF) on October 19, 2013.
- "Montana and World War I 1914–1918" (PDF). Montana Historical Society. Archived from the original (PDF) on December 28, 2013.
- "Montana Core Based Statistical Areas (CBSA) Metropolitan and Micropolitan Statistical Areas" (PDF). Montana Department of Commerce-Census and Economic Information Center. Archived from the original (PDF) on August 26, 2010.
- "Montana Field Guide-Fish". Montana Fish, Wildlife and Parks. Archived from the original on March 25, 2013.
- "Montana Field Guide-Lichens". Montana Fish, Wildlife and Parks. Archived from the original on March 28, 2013.
- "Montana Field Guide-Mammals". Montana Fish, Wildlife and Parks. Archived from the original on March 13, 2013.
- "Montana Field Guide-Reptiles". Montana Fish, Wildlife and Parks. Archived from the original on April 7, 2013.
- "Montana Fishing Regulations". Montana Fish, Wildlife and Parks. 2013. Archived from the original on April 30, 2013.
- "Montana Field Guide-Amphibians". Montana Fish, Wildlife and Parks. Archived from the original on April 7, 2013.
- "Montana Highway Map" (PDF). Montana Department of Transportation. Archived (PDF) from the original on January 17, 2013.
- "Montana Legislature 63rd Session—Majority and Minority Party Numbers 1889–Present". Montana Legislature. December 17, 2012. Archived from the original on May 3, 2013.
- "Montana Mountain Ranges" (PDF). Natural Resource Information System. Montana State Library. Archived (PDF) from the original on February 27, 2012.
- "Montana Official State Bird List". Montana Audubon. 2008. Archived from the original on July 25, 2011.
- "Montana Sedition Project". University of Montana School of Journalism. Archived from the original on November 3, 2013.
- "Montana Television Stations". Station Index. 2013. Archived from the original on September 26, 2013.
- "North American Indian Days". Browning, Montana. 2013. Archived from the original on July 15, 2013.
- "Paddling Montana: Yellowstone River ~~ Excerpted from Paddling Montana by Hank Fisher". Montana Office of Tourism. 2011. Archived from the original on March 14, 2013.
- "Plants & Animals- Maiasaura". Montana Department of Tourism. 2007. Archived from the original on March 15, 2013.
- "Population and Population Centers by State: 2000". Census Bureau. 2000. Archived from the original on September 18, 2008.
- "Population of Gallatin County, Montana: Census 2010 and 2000 Interactive Map". Census Viewer. Archived from the original on June 15, 2013.
- "Profile of General Population and Housing Characteristics: 2010". Census Bureau. October 5, 2010.
- "Property Tax Liability, Billing and Collection". Montana Department of Revenue. January 31, 2012. Archived from the original on July 28, 2013.
- "Recreation". Montana Fish, Wildlife and Parks. Archived from the original on April 24, 2013.
- Resident Population Data (2010). "Resident Population Data (Text Version)". Census Bureau. Archived from the original on July 19, 2018.
- Dippie, Brian W. (2005). "Russell, Charles Marion". In Cook, Ramsay; Bélanger, Réal (eds.). Dictionary of Canadian Biography. Vol. XV (1921–1930) (online ed.). University of Toronto Press.
- "Saskatchewan River-From Glaciers to Grasslands". Canadian Council for Geographic Education. Archived from the original on March 17, 2013.
- "Schweitzer Could Win Sen. nom in '14 but Maybe not MT in '16" (PDF). December 7, 2011. Archived (PDF) from the original on November 27, 2013.
- "Selected Social Characteristics in the United States. 2007–2011 American Community Survey 5-Year Estimates". United States Bureau of the Census. 2012.
- "Setting". Historical Society. Archived from the original on February 28, 2013.
- "Shaped by Winter". Winter Montana. Montana Office of Tourism. 2010. Archived from the original on April 24, 2013.
- "Ski & Stay Packages". Discovery Ski Area. Archived from the original on April 7, 2013.
- "Snowcoaches". Winter Montana. 2010. Archived from the original on April 24, 2013.
- "Snowmobiling". Montana Fish, Wildlife and Parks. Archived from the original on April 28, 2013.
- "Snowmobiling in Montana". Winter Montana. 2010. Archived from the original on April 25, 2013.
- "Snowmobiling in West Yellowstone". Winter Montana. 2010. Archived from the original on April 24, 2013.
- Soil Conservation Service (February 1953). Soil Survey (Reconnaissance): Central Montana. Series 1940, No. 9. Washington, D.C.: U.S. Department of Agriculture.
- "Some Shifts In 2010 Census Numbers Due to Boundary Changes, Not All Growth". Bureau of Business and Economic Research, University of Montana. April 11, 2011. Archived from the original on May 6, 2013.
- "Spokane, Montana's Kentucky Derby Winner". Montana Cowboy Hall of Fame. Archived from the original on May 9, 2013.
- "State Animal Grizzly Bear". Montana Department of Tourism. 2007. Archived from the original on March 15, 2013.
- "State Bird Western Meadowlark". Montana Department of Tourism. 2007. Archived from the original on March 15, 2013.
- "State Fish Blackspotted Cutthroat Trout". Montana Department of Tourism. 2007. Archived from the original on March 15, 2013.
- "State Fish, Montana Code Annotated: 1-1-507". Montana Legislative Services. 2011. Archived from the original on January 17, 2013.
- "State Flower Bitterroot". Montana Department of Tourism. 2007. Archived from the original on February 8, 2013.
- "State Gemstones Sapphire and Agate". Montana Department of Tourism. 2007. Archived from the original on May 30, 2013.
- "State Grass Bluebunch Wheatgrass". Montana Department of Tourism. 2007. Archived from the original on April 21, 2013.
- "State Membership Reports-Montana". Association of Religion Data Archives. Archived from the original on January 25, 2012.
- "TITLE 1. GENERAL LAWS AND DEFINITIONS – CHAPTER 1. GENERAL PROVISIONS – Part 5. State Symbols – Official Designations". Montana Code Annotated 2019. Archived from the original on October 18, 2020.
- "State Song". Montana Department of Tourism. 2007. Archived from the original on January 1, 2014.
- "State Songs". Welcome to America. Archived from the original on November 11, 2020.
- "State Symbols". Montana Department of Tourism. 2007. Archived from the original on March 17, 2013.
- "State Tree Ponderosa Pine". Montana Department of Tourism. 2007. Archived from the original on March 15, 2013.
- "Statewide Fisheries Management Plan". Montana Fish, Wildlife and Parks. Archived from the original on April 24, 2013.
- "St. Mary's Mission in Stevensville designated National Historic District". Montana Catholic. 26 (9). September 27, 2010. Archived from the original on March 22, 2012.
- "Terry". Montana Office of Tourism. 2010. Archived from the original on July 17, 2011.
- "Tester Asks Navy to Christen Submarine USS Montana". Tester Senate. August 20, 2007. Archived from the original on August 29, 2007.
- "Threatened, Endangered and Candidate Species in Montana-Endangered Species Act" (PDF). United States Fish and Wildlife Service. February 2013. Archived from the original (PDF) on June 2, 2013.
- "Time Line of the American Bison". United States Fish and Wildlife Service. Archived from the original on February 11, 2021.
- "Tourism in Montana". Montana Department of Tourism. 2007. Archived from the original on July 1, 2013.
- "Trapping and Furbearer Management in Montana". Montana Fish, Wildlife and Parks. Archived from the original on April 24, 2013.
- "Upper Yellowstone River Mapping Project" (PDF). United States Fish and Wildlife Service. July 2001. Archived from the original (PDF) on March 9, 2012.
- "Union Pacific in Montana" (PDF). Union Pacific Railroad. March 2013. Archived from the original (PDF) on December 15, 2013.
- "U.S. Congress Passes Espionage Act". History Channel. June 15, 1917. Archived from the original on March 13, 2013.
- "USGS Geonames Search Result-Montana+Stream". United States Geological Survey. Archived from the original on May 9, 2022.
- "Verified Trauma Centers". American College of Surgeons. March 20, 2013. Archived from the original on July 7, 2014.
- "Vermont Remains Top State in Capita per Brewery". Brewers Association. Archived from the original on March 17, 2012.
- "Welcome to the Montana High School Association". Montana High School Association. Archived from the original on June 13, 2013.
- "Welcome to the World Ski Joring Championships". Whitefish Skijoring. Archived from the original on June 2, 2013.
- "What was the Great Northern Railway?". Great Northern Railway Historical Society. Archived from the original on September 24, 2005.
- "Woman Suffrage Timeline (1840–1920)". National Women's History Museum. Archived from the original on April 24, 2013.
- Wood, Raymond W.; Thiessen, T.D. (1987). Early Fur Trade on the Northern Plains. Canadian traders Among the Mandan and Hidatsa Indians, 1738-1818. Norman and London: University of Oklahoma Press. ISBN 978-0-8061-1899-4.
- "World War II in Montana 1939–1945" (PDF). Montana Historical Society. Archived from the original (PDF) on May 28, 2013.
- "Yellowstone in Winter: Current Management and Planning". National Park Service. Archived from the original on February 14, 2015.

Preceded by South Dakota	List of U.S. states by date of statehood Admitted on November 8, 1889 (41st)	Succeeded by Washington
