= St. Peter's Hospital =

St. Peter's Hospital may refer to:

Canada

- St. Peter's Hospital (Hamilton) in Hamilton, Ontario

United Kingdom

- St Peter's Hospital, Bristol, in Bristol
- St Peter's Hospital, Chertsey, an NHS district general hospital in Chertsey, Surrey, England
- St Peter's Hospital, Covent Garden, a former hospital in London

United States

- St. Peter's Hospital (Albany, New York), a hospital in New York State
- St. Peter's Hospital (Brooklyn), former hospital in New York City
- St. Peter's Hospital (Helena, Montana), a hospital in Montana
- Providence St. Peter Hospital, Olympia, Washington, also known as St. Peter's Hospital
- Saint Peter's University Hospital in New Brunswick, New Jersey
