= Ray Lawrence =

Ray or Raymond Lawrence may refer to:

- Ray Lawrence (film director) (born 1948), Australian film director
- Ray Lawrence (record producer) (born 1927), American record company executive, record producer
- Raymond Douglas Lawrence (born 1943), Australian organist
- Raymond Lawrence (actor) in Silks and Saddles

== See also ==
- Lawrence Ray (born 1976), Dutch presenter, producer and actor
