= Stephen A. Hope =

American music editor (1931–2003)

- Born: September 15, 1931; Hollywood, California, United States
- Died: June 8, 2003 (aged 71); Burbank, California, United States
- Occupation: Music editor
- Years active: 1970s–1998

Stephen Ackerman Hope (September 15, 1931 – June 8, 2003) was an American music editor.

== Biography ==
He was born on September 15, 1931, to Fredric Hope. At age 4 he played violin for the Beverly Hills Baby Orchestra. He became a film editor at Desilu Studios in the 1950s. He married Mary Elizabeth Hughes.

He worked on National Lampoon's Animal House and all of the Karate Kid films.

He died on June 8, 2003, at Providence Saint Joseph Medical Center in Burbank, California of kidney failure.

He was a member of the Academy of Motion Picture Arts and Sciences, the Motion Picture Editors Guild and the American Federation of Musicians.
