= HMR =

HMR may refer to:

- IATA code for Hamar Airport, Stafsberg, in Norway
- Postal code for Ħamrun, Malta
- ISO 639-3 code for the Hmar language, a Tibeto-Burman language in India
- ICAO code for NAC Air, a Canadian airline
- .17 HMR, a rimfire rifle cartridge

== As an abbreviation ==
- Health Management Resources
- High Mountain Rangers, a television series
- Hoboken Manufacturers Railroad
- Hoechst Marion Roussel, an American subsidiary of Hoechst AG
- Hot module replacement, web technology
- Housing Market Renewal Initiative, in the United Kingdom
- Hyderabad Metro Rail
