= One Sky Health =

Healthcare organization in the western United States

- Type: Not-for-profit
- Industry: Healthcare
- Predecessor: Billings Clinic, Logan Health
- Founded: September 1, 2023
- Headquarters: Billings and Kalispell, Montana, United States
- Area served: Montana and Wyoming
- Number of employees: 9,000
- Website: www.billingsclinic.com

One Sky Health is a United States not-for-profit healthcare system with over 25 clinics and hospitals in Montana and Wyoming. It was formed in 2023 through the merger of Logan Health and Billings Clinic, adopting the One Sky Health brand in 2026. The combined system employs more than 9,000 people.

== Hospitals ==
One Sky Health operates more than 25 clinics and hospitals. Its two primary hospitals are Billings Clinic and Logan Health Medical Center.

== See also ==
- List of hospitals in Montana
