= Community Medical Center =

Community Medical Center may refer to:

- Community Medical Center (Montana)
- Adventist Health Hanford, formerly Hanford Community Medical Center
- Community Medical Center (New Jersey) in Toms River
- Community Medical Center Long Beach
- Community Medical Center (Nebraska) in Falls City
- Cordova Community Medical Center in Cordova, Alaska
- Putnam Community Medical Center in Putnam, Florida
- Community Regional Medical Center in Fresno, California

== See also ==
- Community Regional Medical Center
- Community hospital
