= Jeff Lawrence (entrepreneur) =

American businessman

- Born: November 14, 1957 (age 68); Cleveland, Ohio, U.S.
- Occupations: entrepreneur, technologist, philanthropist
- Years active: 1980s - present
- Spouse: Diane Troth (m. 1986–2016)

Jeff Lawrence (born November 14, 1957) is an American entrepreneur, technologist and philanthropist. He founded and ran a number telecommunications systems companies. He sold one of his business to Intel in 2000 and worked for Intel until 2002. As a result, together with his wife he founded The Lawrence Foundation giving out grants to non-profit environmental, human services, and other causes.

== Early life ==
Jeff was born in Cleveland, Ohio. His father was Ray Lawrence and his mother was Grace Lawrence. He has two younger sisters, Connie and Lisa. Jeff was married to Diane Troth, who died on November 30, 2016, and they have two children, Christopher and Kathy. He lived briefly in Northridge, California and New York, New York, and grew up in Van Nuys, California and Studio City, California. He was very interested in science and technology as a child. While going to college Jeff worked at Butterfly Media Dimensions, a company founded by Allen Secher, a rabbi, civil rights activist, radio personality, and television producer. Jeff received a bachelor's degree in electrical engineering from the University of California, Los Angeles, in 1979.

== Career ==
After graduating from UCLA Jeff joined Amdahl Corporation's Communications Systems Division in 1980. Amdahl had just finished acquiring the privately held company Tran Telecommunications which became its Communications Systems Division. At Amdahl, Jeff developed software for high performance packet switching systems designed for large enterprise and public data network infrastructures. Amdahl's circuit and packet switching systems were sold to PTT's and enterprises around the world. Some customers for the circuit and packet switching systems included Pacific Bell, SAPO, the Trans-Canada Telephone System and AT&T. The systems were used to build the Pacific Bell, Datapac and SAPONET public data networks as well as portions of AT&T's enterprise network. Jeff left Amdahl just before it moved its Communications Systems Division from Marina Del Rey, California to Richardson, Texas and went to Doelz Networks in 1985.

At Doelz, Jeff developed software and systems for high availability local area network and wide area network products for large enterprise network infrastructures. After the 1987 stock market crash, Doelz Networks experienced financial difficulties and Jeff was laid off in 1988. Doelz Networks was bought by its management and a group of European investors in 1988.

Jeff co-founded, with Larisa Chistyakov, Trillium Digital Systems in 1988 and served as its President & CEO until its acquisition by Intel Corporation in 2000. Jeff continued at Intel as the Chief Technology Officer for its Communications Group and left Intel in 2002. Trillium Digital Systems developed and licensed communications software to communications equipment manufacturers building the Wireless, Internet, broadband and telephone infrastructure. Trillium software has been developed, licensed and used to build telecommunications equipment for over 30 years.

Jeff sits on the UCLA Samueli School of Engineering Dean's executive board.

Jeff served on the board of directors of Guidance Software (NASDAQ:GUID), a provider of computer forensic, eDiscovery and cybersecurity between 2008 and 2015. Guidance Software was acquired by OpenText (NASDAQ: OTEX) in September 2017.

== Philanthropy ==
Jeff and his wife, Diane Troth, founded The Lawrence Foundation in 2000 after Trillium's acquisition by Intel. The Lawrence Foundation is a family foundation that makes grants to non-profit environmental, human services, and other causes. The Lawrence Foundation has made over $6 million in grants since its inception.

Jeff co-founded, with Lori Mitchell, the Common Grant Application in 2006 and continues to serve as its president. The Common Grant Application offers a Web-based service that serves as a common application to non-profit grantseekers and a grant management system to non-profit grantmakers.

== Achievements ==
- 1997, 1998 - Trillium listed in Inc. 500 for its fast growth as a private company
- 1997 – Co-recipient of the Greater Los Angeles Area Entrepreneur of the Year award
- 2005 – Recipient of the UCLA School of Engineering's Professional Achievement award
