= BMG Rights Management =

International music company

BMG Rights Management GmbH

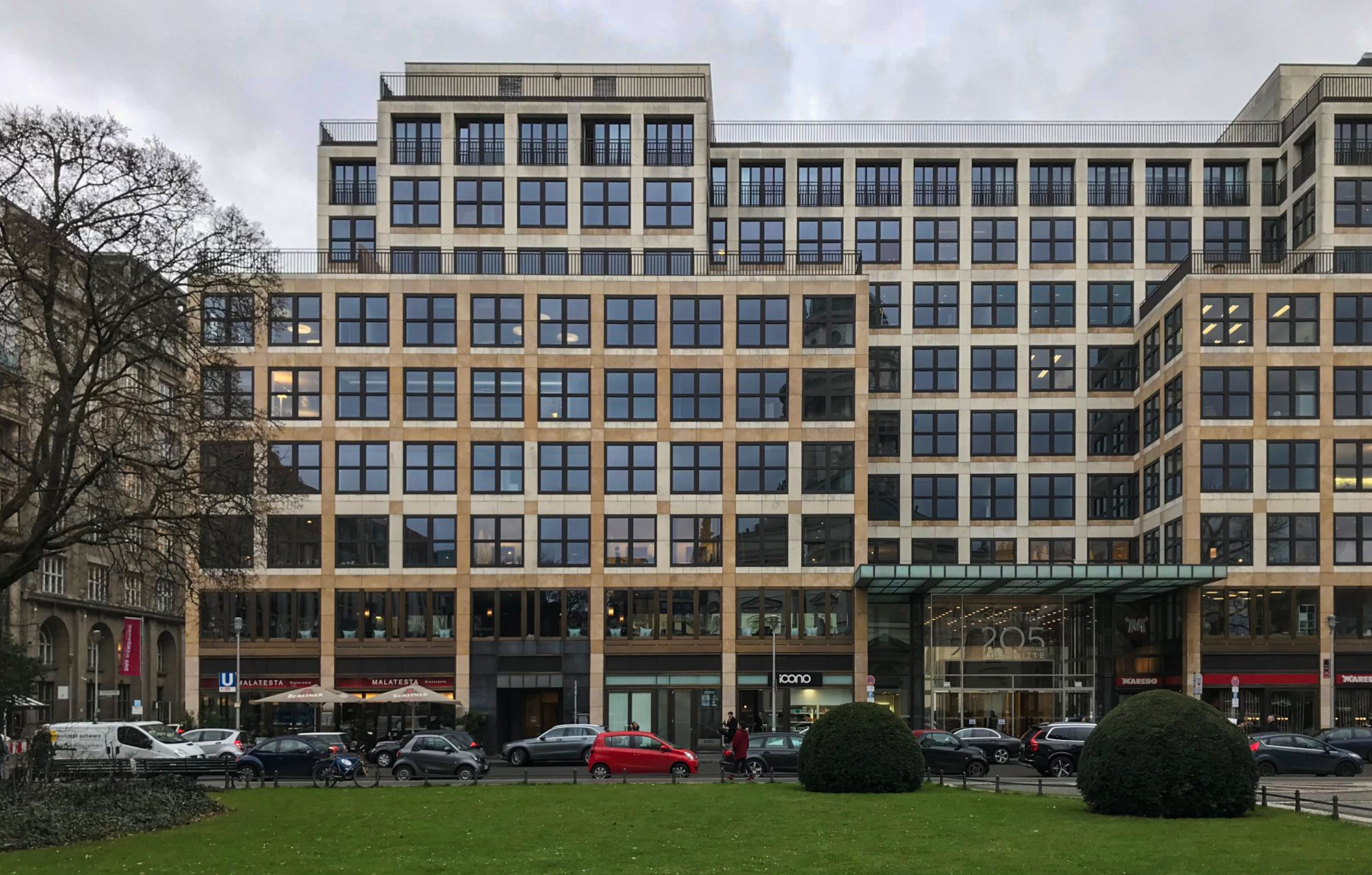
- Quartier 205 in Berlin Mitte, where the headquarters of BMG are located (2018)
- Trade name: BMG
- Type: Subsidiary
- Industry: Music
- Predecessors: Bertelsmann Music Group; Sony BMG Music Entertainment; Concord
- Founded: 1 October 2008; 18 years ago in Berlin, Germany
- Headquarters: Nashville, Tennessee, U.S. (corporate); Berlin, Germany (operational)
- Number of locations: 18 countries (2026)
- Area served: Worldwide
- Key people: Bob Valentine (CEO); Björn Bauer (CFO); Sebastian Hentzschel (COO); Victor Zaraya (CRO)
- Services: Music rights management, Theatrical Licensing and Production, Film and Television
- Revenue: ▲€905 million ($1 billion) (2023)
- Owner: Bertelsmann (67%); Great Mountain Partners (33%)
- Number of employees: 1,143 (2024)
- Divisions: Concord Records; BMG Publishing
- Subsidiaries: Concord Theatricals; Concord Originals; Boosey & Hawkes; Rodgers and Hammerstein; Kidz Bop; RKO Pictures; Stem Disintermedia
- Website: bmg.com
- Footnotes; BMG's main distributor is Universal Music Group for physical media marketing only, with digital distribution duties being transferred to BMG's own systems. Additional distributors, depending on artist and division, are Sony Music, The Orchard, PIAS Group, SPV GmbH, Alternative Distribution Alliance, Good2Go, Demon Music Group, Rough Trade and others.

BMG Rights Management GmbH (also known simply as BMG) is a German-American music company, with its corporate headquarters based in Nashville, Tennessee, United States, located within its BMG Rights Management (US) LLC arm, while its operational headquarters are in Berlin, Germany, located within its now-former main headquarters & newly-declared European headquarters. It combines the activities of a music publisher and a record label.

BMG was originally founded in Germany in 1985 and relaunched in October 2008 after Bertelsmann sold its stake in Sony BMG to Sony. From 2009 to 2013, the investment firm KKR held 51% of the company, which became one of the world's largest music publishers during that time. BMG is 67% owned by Bertelsmann and 33% by Great Mountain Partners following the merger with Concord.

== History ==
=== Music at Bertelsmann ===

The origins of the company can be traced back to the 1950s, when Bertelsmann entered the music business after it added music to its book club. Ariola, a record label, was launched and Sonopress, a pressing plant, was established. In 1975, Ariola opened an office in the United States. Bertelsmann acquired Arista Records in 1979 and half ownership of RCA Records in 1985, thereby becoming one of the world's largest music companies. After the full acquisition of RCA Records in 1987, Bertelsmann's various subsidiaries were brought together to form Bertelsmann Music Group (BMG), which covered a number of genres, including folk, pop, and especially classical music.

In response to declining sales in the overall music market, Bertelsmann agreed to merge its record label interests with Sony in 2003; the company was called Sony BMG. Furthermore, in 2006, Bertelsmann sold its subsidiary BMG Music Publishing to Universal Music Group. Having reached the conclusion that established music publishing companies and record labels were not appropriate for an increasingly digital music business, Bertelsmann sold its stake in the Sony BMG joint venture in 2008. The company was subsequently renamed Sony Music Entertainment.

=== Launch of the new BMG ===
In October 2008, Bertelsmann launched the new BMG with a small portfolio of recorded music rights of around 200 artists it retained from Sony BMG. It declared it would pursue a business model focused on fairness, service and transparency.

The launch of the new BMG came amidst the 2008 financial crisis, and within two weeks of the collapse of Lehman Brothers. Since Bertelsmann could not supply the required funds on its own, a 51% stake was sold to financial investor KKR in 2009. Bertelsmann retained 49% and the right to appoint the company's management. The transaction allowed BMG to increase its equity ratio.

=== International expansion ===
Initially, Bertelsmann had announced that the new BMG would focus on the European broadcast market. After KKR became the majority shareholder, the company set its sights on expanding internationally. A key step towards achieving this goal was acquiring Cherry Lane Music Publishing in 2009, which provided BMG with its first foothold in the United States. BMG made several other purchases in 2010, including Evergreen Copyright Acquisitions (whose catalogs included MC Hammer's catalog, Ryko and Joe Boyd's Warlock Music), and Chrysalis Music.

In 2011, Bug Music was bought by BMG, followed by music publishers R2M Music and Fred Ahlert Music in 2012. Bertelsmann was also reported to be interested in buying EMI, but EMI was ultimately acquired by Universal Music Group and Warner Music Group (record labels) and Sony/ATV Music Publishing (songwriters). The regulatory authorities approved the deal subject to some conditions, including the sale of several labels. BMG was thus able to acquire Mute Records (2012) and Sanctuary Records (2013), as well as the publishing catalogues of EMI Virgin Music and Famous Music UK from Sony/ATV.

=== Becoming a group division ===
In 2013, KKR sold its stake in BMG to Bertelsmann, making it the sole shareholder of the company. Under the leadership of chief executive officer Thomas Rabe, who had been a key driver of BMG's expansion during his time as Chief Financial Officer, Bertelsmann again cited music as one of its strategic growth areas.

In 2013, the company began to represent rights to songs by Robbie Williams and the Rolling Stones. Record labels were also added to the portfolio including Union Square Music (distributor of Universal Music's ZTT Records and Stiff Records), Vagrant Music and Infectious Music (2014), as well as S-Curve Records and Rise Records (2015). Other acquisitions followed in 2016, including the label ARC Music and the catalog of The End Records. By acquiring Basement, BMG entered the market in Brazil, one of Bertelsmann's growth regions. In 2016, the company also signed an agreement with Warner Music's Alternative Distribution Alliance for the physical and digital distribution of music, allowing BMG to consolidate its longstanding sales structures. BMG further expanded by entering the Chinese market in cooperation with Alibaba, allowing the online company to distribute the work of musicians and composers via its web channels while securing copyrights.

In the 2015 financial year, BMG was part of the Corporate Investments division at Bertelsmann. In 2016, the media group turned the subsidiary into a stand-alone division. Today, BMG is considered a prime example of how growth platforms are created and leveraged at Bertelsmann.

=== Acquisition of BBR Music, new labels and the merger with Concord ===
In 2017, BMG announced the purchase of BBR Music Group, including the labels Broken Bow Records, Red Bow Records, Stoney Creek Records, Wheelhouse Records and the music publisher Magic Mustang Music. With a value of more than 100 million dollars, the transaction was the largest recorded music acquisition in the company's history. BMG thus improved its position in the country music segment and ensured its long-term presence in the Nashville music industry and its overall impact on the United States market.

In 2022, BMG announced its first new British record label within the group since 2009, Tag8 Music. This label was set up in association with ex-Bros member Craig Logan and his management company Logan Media Entertainment, with Tag8 Music featuring established acts such as Pixie Lott, Roachford, and Louise Redknapp as part of its roster. On the Official Albums Chart of 4 November 2022, the label charted its first hit album in the form of Blue's Heart & Soul.

In October 2023, BMG signed with Universal Music Group for physical distribution, and started self-distributing its own catalog on digital platforms, thus ending their partnership with Warner Music. The transition of physical distribution to Universal took place over the course of 2024, and the change was completed later in October 2024.

In April 2026, BMG announced that the company will merge with Concord to create the fourth major music company in the world. The new firm is scheduled to operate under the BMG name (with record label operations under the "Concord Records" name & music publishing operations under the "BMG Publishing" name), with Bertelsmann owning a 67% stake in the new company and the remainder owned by Great Mountain Partners, and with its corporate headquarters moving to Nashville in the United States, while the Berlin offices remain as both the European headquarters, as well as its operations headquarters. On June 12, 2026, the merger was approved by the German Federal Cartel Office. On June 17, 2026, the merger was approved by the US competition authorities and the merger was completed on September 1, 2026.

== Corporate structure ==
BMG's parent enterprise is BMG Rights Management GmbH, a limited liability company according to German law. The company's objective is "the marketing of music, as well as its development and delivery" for use in media, at concerts and for other purposes. BMG has numerous subsidiaries and shareholdings, for example, BMG Rights Management (Europe) GmbH. In addition to Germany, BMG is present in Australia, Brazil, China, France, Hong Kong, Italy, Mexico, Spain, the UK, the Benelux countries, the United States, Canada, and Scandinavia.

As of December 2025, BMG's senior management includes Thomas Coesfeld (Chief Executive Officer), Mathis Wolter (Chief Financial Officer), Melanie McAllister (Chief Human Resources Officer) and Sebastian Hentzschel (Chief Operating Officer). Masuch has been a member of Bertelsmann's Group Management Committee since 2013.

In the 2018 financial year, BMG posted revenues of €545 million. Rights and licenses accounted for 91.1% and products and merchandise 8.9%. Almost half of its revenues (44.1%) were generated in the United States. Other important markets were the United Kingdom (24.7%), Germany (6.3%) and France (3.9%).

== Business model ==
BMG offers musicians the services generally provided by music publishers and record labels. Unlike its major competitors, it runs them under the same roof and on the same technology platform. More recently, it has added film, television, and books to its roster of services.

=== Publishing ===
BMG publishing represents the rights of songwriters.

=== Production music ===
BMG has a significant library of production music (library music), for use in films, television, advertising, and other media. These catalogues include MusicDirector (part of Talpa Music), Human Music, Music Beyond, X-Ray Dog, Beds & Beats, Valentino Production Music, Immediate Music, AXS Music, Altitude Music, and Must Save Jane.

== Labels ==
In addition to its 18 worldwide divisions, BMG also owns and/or distributes the following record labels as of September 2026:

- Concord Records
  - Concord Jazz
  - Heads Up International
  - Fantasy Records
  - Telarc International Corporation
- BBR Music Group
  - Broken Bow Records
  - Stoney Creek Records
  - Wheelhouse Records
- Rise Records
- Kidz Bop
- Fearless Records
  - Razor & Tie
  - Washington Square
- Rounder Records
  - Sugar Hill Records (bluegrass label)
  - Zoë Records
  - Music For Little People
- Vagrant Records
- Infectious Music
- Skint Records
  - Loaded Records
- Dark Horse Records
- The End Records
- RAM Records
- RBC Records
- World Circuit Records
- Loma Vista Recordings (joint venture)
- Easy Eye Sound (joint venture)
- Victor Victor Worldwide (joint venture)
- Ninja Tune
- PULSE Records
- Concord Theatricals Recordings
- Stem Disintermedia
- BMG Production Music
- 19 Recordings
- 43B
- Cavalcade Recordings
- Paracadute
- Cheyenne Records
- Intertwine (joint venture with Eshy Gazit)
- Modern Recordings
- Telamo
- Renew Records
- OM Records (joint-venture with Olympique de Marseille)
- Tag8 Music
- Queenie Records

=== Catalogues ===
- Craft Recordings
  - Craft Latino
    - El Cartel Records
    - Fania Records
    - Musart Records
    - Panart
  - Contemporary Records
  - HitCo Music
  - Independiente
  - Nitro Records
  - Milestone Records
  - Prestige Records
  - Savoy Records
  - Specialty Records
  - Stax Records
  - Vanguard Records
  - Varèse Sarabande
  - Vee-Jay Records
  - Victory Records
  - Wind-up Records
- Sanctuary Records Group
  - Castle Communications
  - Pye Records
  - Precision Records and Tapes
  - Transatlantic Records
  - Sugar Hill Records (hip hop label)
  - CMC International
  - Mayan Records
  - Neat Records
  - Noise Records
  - RAS Records
  - Trojan Records
    - Jet Records
    - Upsetter Records
  - Urban Records
- Mute Records (pre-2010 catalogue)
- S-Curve Records (back catalogue)
- Countdown Media
  - Alshire/Somerset
  - Everest Records
  - Mediaphon
  - Dobre Records
  - SRP Records
  - Glove Music
  - Alto Records
- Verse Music Group
  - Golden Records
  - Bethlehem Records
  - Salsoul Records
  - West End Records
- Pete Waterman Entertainment
- BMG Chrysalis (restructured and consolidated in 2016 and 2017 by incorporating BMG 10 Music, BMG FM Music and BMG VM Music)
  - The Echo Label
  - MAM Records
- Union Square Music
  - Salvo
  - Metro
- Disques Dreyfus
- Albert Music
  - Albert Productions
- Strictly Rhythm (back catalogue)

== Awards ==
- 2016, 2017, 2018: "Independent Publisher of the Year" by American Society of Composers, Authors and Publishers
- 2018: "Production Music Awards" for BMG Production Music
- 2018: "Publisher of the Year", A&R Awards, United Kingdom
