= Allen Secher =

- Born: Allen Secher; February 14, 1935 (age 91); Pittsburgh, Pennsylvania, U.S.
- Occupations: Rabbi, civil and human rights activist, radio host, television producer and director, actor, author and public speaker
- Years active: 1960s – present

Rabbi Allen Secher (born February 14, 1935) is a rabbi, civil and human rights activist, radio host, television producer, actor, author and public speaker.

== Early life ==
Allen was born in Pittsburgh, Pennsylvania. His father was Jack Secher, and his mother was Eleanor Steiner. He has one sister, Linda and three children, Judith, Debra and Adam. Allen grew up in Pittsburgh and Butler, Pennsylvania.

Allen's father, Jack, graduated from the University of Pittsburgh in 1925 and from Columbia University in 1927 with a Master of Social Work. While at the University of Pittsburgh, Jack performed social work at the Irene Kaufmann Settlement and, along with his wife, ran a puppet theater there. After graduating from Columbia University, he opened and ran a series of restaurants and delicatessens in Pittsburgh.

Allen received a Bachelor of Philosophy from Brandeis University, was ordained by New York's Hebrew Union College in 1962, and earned his honorary Doctor of Divinity degree from Hebrew Union College in 1987.

While attending Brandeis University, Allen served as Eleanor Roosevelt's driver for five days in June 1955.

== Rabbi ==
Allen Secher served congregations in New York City, Mexico City, Los Angeles, Chicago and Montana between 1962 and 2013. In the 1960s, Secher pioneered multi-media worship services at Temple Ahavat Shalom Northridge in Los Angeles.

After leaving his congregation in Los Angeles and moving to Chicago, Secher started, ran, and closed an audio recording business for conferences and meetings. The company was first named Aviva and then renamed Butterfly Media Dimensions. The name Butterfly was in honor of "I Never Saw Another Butterfly," a collection of Jewish children's art and poetry from the Theresienstadt concentration camp.

In 1991, Rabbi Secher founded Makom Shalom, Chicago's first Jewish Renewal congregation, with his wife, Ina Albert, bringing traditional and holistic paths (mysticism, meditation, gender equality) toward spiritual intimacy. He also served on the board of Aleph, the umbrella organization for Renewal Judaism.

Secher moved to Whitefish, Montana, in 2000. In 2008, there were only about 1,000 self-identified Jews in Montana, a state with a population of about 900,000. For many years, Secher was the only resident rabbi in Montana. He traveled between Whitefish, Missoula, Helena, Bozeman, Billings and Great Falls congregations and was known as the "Lone Rabbi of Montana". Secher retired from congregational life in 2013.

== Civil and human rights activist ==
In the early 1960s, Secher was one of the Freedom Riders during the civil rights movement.

In August 1962, Dr. King called the clergy to join him on a prayer pilgrimage to Albany, Georgia, to support the civil rights movement. Dr. King had three requirements to participate—each person needed to have bail money, they could not have anything on their arrest record that would embarrass the civil rights movement, and they all had to commit non-violence. Secher traveled to Albany and was part of a group of clergy that held a prayer service on August 28, 1962, in front of the Albany city hall. Four hundred onlookers watched as all 75 clergy were arrested and taken to 4 surrounding jails.

Dr. King wrote a "Letter from the St. Augustine Jail" to Rabbi Israel S. Dresner, urging him to recruit rabbis from the Central Conference of American Rabbis to come to St. Augustine, Florida and take part in the demonstrations being held in St. Augustine. Secher responded to the appeal and traveled to St. Augustine to participate in the demonstrations. Sixteen rabbis, including Secher, arrived and attempted to integrate the whites-only pool and restaurant with a group of civil rights organizers at the Monson Motor Lodge on June 18, 1964. The protesters and rabbis were arrested.

While in a segregated holding cell at St. John's County Jail, the clergy wrote a group letter titled "Why We Went: A Joint Letter from the Rabbis Arrested in St. Augustine." The day after the demonstration Congress passed the Civil Rights Act of 1964 on June 19, 1964, after an 83-day filibuster.

The 1964 St. Augustine actions, focusing on Alan Secher's exeperience in the context of his lifetime of civil rights work, was the topic of a one-person play "When the Rabbis Came to Town." In 2026 the play was performed in St Augustine in an event commemorating the anniversary. Secher, the last surviving rabbi from that time, traveled there to read aloud the "Why We Went" letter and to participate in a discussion after the performance.

In January 2005, Montana Governor Brian Schweitzer appointed Secher to the Montana State Human Rights Commission and reappointed him in 2009. In November 2011, Montana Governor Brian Schweitzer appointed Secher to the Montana Arts Council.

In 2008, Secher, his wife, Ina Alpert and two others co-founded Love Lives Here in Whitefish, a non-profit organization dedicated to diversity and equal treatment for all citizens, in response to some white nationalist film showings. Love Lives Here worked with other Whitefish community members to try to get the Whitefish City Council to enact diversity, tolerance and anti-discrimination legislation. In 2015, the Whitefish City Council approved an anti-discrimination ordinance.

In 2015, Richard B. Spencer, a spokesman for the "alt-right," lived part of the year in Whitefish. Richard and his mother, Sherry Spencer, own property in downtown Whitefish. Sherry claimed that a local Jewish realtor attempted to force her to sell her property because Richard was her son.

On December 16, 2016, the website The Daily Stormer asked its readers to unleash "an old-fashioned Troll Storm" on Montana's Jews and provided contact details for five Whitefish residents, including Secher, his wife, two others and a local child. The post also included photographs of some residents, superimposed with a yellow Star of David bearing the word "Jude," the German word for Jew.

The events in Whitefish became part of a larger national dialogue about the alt-right, White nationalism and antisemitism.

Secher also served on committees at North Valley Hospital in Whitefish and Kalispell Regional Medical Center in Kalispell, Montana.

== Radio and film ==
From 1967 to 1997, Allen A could be heard weekly on more than 450 Armed Forces Radio stations worldwide. His internationally syndicated show, East of Eden, featured interviews, poetry, music, and perspectives on various subjects. East of Eden was rated No. 1 in its category and had a weekly audience of millions of listeners. Some guests included Ray Bradbury, Dalton Trumbo, Maya Angelou, John Cassavetes, Elie Wiesel and Rod McKuen. At one point, it was the longest-running show on the Armed Forces Radio Network.

In 2002, Secher hosted a radio show called Nice and Easy featuring Frank Sinatra on KOFI, a local station in Kalispell. In September 2007, Secher hosted a new show called You Must Remember This on Montana Public Radio. The show is a monthly hour-long program featuring performers, compositions, and composers of the Great American Songbook, music from the 1930s to 1950s.

A longtime voice actor, Secher is the voice of The Dude Abides audiobook.

In the early 1970s, Secher served as a consultant for the CBS television sitcom Bridget Loves Bernie. The show depicted an interfaith marriage between a Jewish man and an Irish Catholic woman (played by the actors David Birney and Meredith Baxter, who married in real life after the show ended in 1973).

Secher served as communications director for the Jewish Federation of Chicago between 1980 and 1990. He produced religious and ecumenical programming and independently produced television documentaries, receiving seven Emmy Awards for television production and direction. His Emmy Awards are:

Award	Category	Entry	Role	Year
Chicago Emmy	Outstanding Achievements for Children's Programming: For a Series	The Magic Door	Producer	1981
Chicago Emmy	Series Program for Children's Programming	The Magic Door	Producer	
Chicago Emmy	Series Program for Children's Programming	The Magic Door	Producer	1987
Chicago Emmy	Outstanding Achievements for Children's Programming: For a Series	Nothing Is Simple	Producer	1988
Chicago/Midwest Emmy	Children Programming Single Program	The Odd Potato	Producer	1990
Chicago/Midwest Emmy	Cultural Significance	Choosing One's Way: Resistance in Auschwitz-Birkenau	Producer	1995
Chicago/Midwest Emmy	Non-Performers-Directing/Edited	Choosing One's Way: Resistance in Auschwitz-Birkenau	Directing	1995

Among his Emmy-winning documentaries was the PBS special, "Choosing One’s Way: Resistance in Auschwitz-Birkenau". It was first aired in September 1994 and featured Oscar winner Ellen Burstyn as the narrator. It also won the Hugo Award (for documentary) at the Chicago International Film Festival and was nominated for a Peabody Award.

Secher's acting credits include roles in Brian's Song and Marcus Welby, M.D.

Since 2007, Secher has produced the annual Martin Luther King Jr. program for Northwest Montana in conjunction with Love Lives Here.

Secher is also a former board member of the Whitefish Theatre Company, where he most recently played the title role of Brandeis University professor Morrie Schwartz in a production of Tuesdays with Morrie.

He also lectured throughout the United States on "The Historic Image of the Jew in Film" and taught the psychology of film for several years at the University of California, Los Angeles.

Secher was one of the rabbis featured in the documentary film The Rabbi Goes West, which is about a Chabad house rabbi in Montana.

== Interfaith ==
For 55 years, beginning with his first wedding on the day he was ordained, Rabbi Secher has officiated and co-officiated more than 2,000 weddings and other interfaith life cycle ceremonies. Dedicated to providing information and support to interfaith couples (both Christian and Jewish), he was a founder and longtime advisor to The Dovetail Institute, which at one time was the largest network for interfaith family resources in the nation.

In 1991, Secher and Father John Cusick (of the Roman Catholic Archdiocese of Chicago) co-founded and served as advisors to The Jewish/Catholic Dialogue Group of Chicago, which provided support to interfaith couples who wished to explore a path in their interfaith marriage that permitted individual faith commitments without diminishing each partner's religious identification. In 1996, the organization also founded the Chicago Interfaith Family School, where Secher continues to serve as an advisor. Its mission includes supporting, educating, and offering general information to Jews and Catholics seeking to understand one another better.

During his Chicago years, Rabbi Secher was an active member of the National Conference of Christians and Jews (now known as the National Conference for Community and Justice).

Secher has spoken and written about interfaith issues.

Secher currently lives with his wife in Chicago, Illinois.

== Selected articles, publications and presentations ==
- "The Joy of Failure". TEDxWhitefish. 2014.
- "Working on the Inside: The Spiritual Life Through the Eyes of Actors". Retta Blaney. Sheed & Ward. 2003.
- "Jesus Through Jewish Eyes". Chapter. Edited by Beatrice Bruteau. Orbis. 2001.
- "The Dude Abides: The Gospel According to the Coen Brothers". Foreword. Cathleen Falsani. Zondervan. 2009.
- "Strange Wives: The Paradox of Biblical Intermarriage". Allen Secher and Stanley Ned Rosenbaum, PhD. Mary Rosenbaum. December 2015.
- "Ray Lawrence: The Record Man". As told to Allen Secher. Bohas Books, 2017. ISBN 978-1389802010
