= St. Patrick Hospital and Health Sciences Center =

Providence St. Patrick Hospital
- Providence Health & Services

Geography
- Location: Missoula, Montana, United States
- Coordinates: 46.8755°N 114.0000°W

Services
- Emergency department: Level II trauma center
- Beds: 237

Helipads
- Helipad: Yes

History
- Founded: 1873

Links
- Website: montana.providence.org/locations-directory/s/st-patrick-hospital
- Lists: Hospitals in Montana

Providence St. Patrick Hospital, is a health care facility in Missoula, Montana.

== Overview ==
Providence St. Patrick Hospital is the only level II trauma center in western Montana, northern Idaho, and Southwest Montana. The hospital employs more than 1,600 people and is the second largest employer in the Missoula area. It has 237 beds, and is the only hospital in western Montana other than Community Medical Center that has helicopter facilities.

St. Patrick Hospital also hosts the Providence Heart Institute. The hospital served as one of four original Ebola containment units in the United States, withdrawing from the program in December 2014, at which time there were 35 other such facilities. St. Patrick Hospital is located in the Downtown Missoula district; Missoula a thriving city, and college town that has around 70,000 people in its primary city and around 111,000 people in Missoula County, Montana.

The present facility opened in 1984, and is the fourth on the property, which sits above the Clark Fork River. The name was officially changed from St. Patrick Hospital and Health Sciences Center to St. Patrick Hospital in July 2011.

== Broadway Building ==
Connected to the south end of St. Patrick Hospital is the Broadway Building, which is a six-floor medical building, with two underground parking lots. It was completed in March 2002 and has stood as one of the tallest buildings in Western Montana since its completion. The building replaced the old Broadway Building, and the new building obtained the same name.

- The first floor is occupied by The Learning Center medical library, Broadway Pharmacy, a conference center and a Wellness Center.
- The second floor includes Broadway Imaging and Lab, Western Montana Clinic Lab and Montana Cancer Center.
- The third floor includes a walk way from the hospital at the International Heart Institute of Montana and the floor also offers outpatient services including Providence Medical Group's Women's Care Center, Bariatric Services, Montana Spine & Pain Center and Montana Neurosurgical Specialists.
- The fourth floor is occupied by Providence Medical Group's Broadway Internal Medicine, Providence Nephrology and Western Montana Clinic.
- The fifth floor includes Western Montana Clinic and Missoula Surgical Associates. Finally the sixth floor is also occupied by Western Montana Clinic and Now Care.

== See also ==
- Community Medical Center (Montana)
- List of hospitals in Montana
