= Queen Valley =

Queen Valley may refer to:

- Queen Valley, Arizona
- Queen Valley in Joshua Tree National Park

== See also ==
- Valley of the Queens (or "Queens Valley") in Egypt
- Queen of the Valley Medical Center in Napa, California
