= The Lawrence Foundation =

American foundation

- Formation: 1988
- Type: Nonprofit organization
- Headquarters: Santa Monica, CA, United States
- President: Jeff Lawrence
- Key people: Lori Mitchell
- Revenue: $252,580 (2016)
- Expenses: $316,493 (2016)
- Website: www.thelawrencefoundation.org

The Lawrence Foundation is a private family foundation in the United States focused on making grants to support environmental, education, human services and other causes. It makes both program and operating grants and does not have any geographical restrictions. Nonprofit organizations that qualify for public charity status under section 501(c)(3) of the US Internal Revenue Code or other similar organizations are eligible for grants from The Lawrence Foundation.

== Background ==
The Lawrence Foundation was established in 2000 by Jeff Lawrence and Diane Troth (husband and wife) from the proceeds received from the acquisition of Trillium Digital Systems, Inc. by Intel Corporation. Trillium Digital Systems, Inc. developed and licensed communications software and was founded in 1988 by Jeff Lawrence and Larisa Chistyakov. The founding trustees of the foundation were Jeff and Diane. Diane died in 2016. The current trustees are Jeff and his two children.

== Grant funding ==
Since its founding in 2000, the Foundation has received over 30,000 grant applications and made grants of over US$ 6 million. The Foundation ended 2025 with over US$ 4 million in assets. Statistics of all applications received and grants made in 2025 and earlier can be found here. To apply to The Lawrence Foundation, non-profits must use the Common Grant Application, an online grant application and management system. The Lawrence Foundation does not accept paper-based letter of inquiry and/or grant applications.

== Direct funding ==
In March 2005, The Lawrence Foundation, in conjunction with the Natural Resources Defense Council and Tufts University, organized and hosted a workshop of environmental economists from academia. The purpose of the workshop was to identify, develop and engage a network of economists and others that shared and supported a common vision of developing, delivering and advocating credible and effective economic theories and arguments for environmental protection, stewardship, and investment. In 2006, the economists who attended that meeting started Center for the Applied Study of Economics and Environment (CASE&E), with a year of preliminary programs – launching an online directory of economists open to working with the environmental movement, and offering summer internships with environmental groups, and dissertation support, for economics graduate students. The organization continues to grow and recently changed its name to Economics for Equity and the Environment Network (E3) to more accurately reflect its current focus.

== Other ==
Lawrence is a common name and there are other Lawrence Foundations in the United States with different grantmaking focuses and interests than The Lawrence Foundation in Santa Monica, CA.
