= Billings Clinic =

Billings Clinic Hospital
- Billings Clinic

Geography
- Location: 2800 10th Ave N, Billings, Montana, United States

Organization
- Type: Teaching
- Affiliated university: Mayo Clinic; Rocky Vista University
- Network: One Sky Health

Services
- Standards: Joint Commission
- Emergency department: Level I Trauma Center
- Beds: 336

Helipads
- Helipad: FAA LID: MT55
Number	Length		Surface
Number	ft	m	Surface
H1	20x20	6x6	concrete

Links
- Website: www.billingsclinic.com
- Lists: Hospitals in Montana

Billings Clinic is a regional health care center based in Billings, Montana, and owned by One Sky Health. It provides primary and specialty care at Billings Clinic downtown (its main campus), one of the system's flagship hospitals. Other locations include Billings Clinic Heights, Billings Clinic West, and numerous affiliate locations in Big Timber, Bozeman, Colstrip, Columbus, Glendive, Harlowton, Lewistown, Livingston, Miles City, Red Lodge, Roundup, and Scobey, Montana, as well as Cody, Lovell, and Sheridan, Wyoming.

Located in downtown Billings, Billings Clinic Hospital is a 336-bed hospital which includes a 20-suite family birth center with a Level III NICU, an Inpatient Cancer Care Unit, a Surgery Center, a Level I Emergency & Trauma Center, a Medical Intensive Care Unit & the state's only Surgical Intensive Care Unit. Billings Clinic is the first Level I Trauma Center in Montana & Wyoming.

The hospital operates MedFlight, the most specialized flight program in the region. MedFlight offers both fixed wing & rotor wing flights, and recently started the first mobile ECMO transport program in Montana. MedFlight functions as a mobile ICU/ED, and also has a NICU/High Risk OB Team.

Billings Clinic has nearly 600 physicians and advanced practitioners offering more than 80 specialties.

== History & Recognition ==
The Billings Clinic was founded by Dr. Arthur J. Movius, who started his Billings medical practice in 1911. In 1915, after practicing on his own, Movius had Dr. J.H. Bridenbaugh join him as an assistant. Bridenbaugh operated and managed obstetrics and began working with a ground-breaking device, the x-ray machine. During World War I, Bridenbaugh joined the military, where he received training in radiology. After returning from the war, Bridenbaugh incorporated diagnostic x-rays and radiation therapy into his practice.

By 1930, five other physicians joined Movius and Bridenbaugh, forming the Movius-Bridenbaugh Clinic, which specialized in obstetrics, fractures, and trauma. In 1939, the clinic conceived a plan to recruit new physicians as partners of the hospital, changing the name to The Billings Clinic. Construction began on a new clinic across the street from Billings Deaconess Hospital in 1950.

In 2013, The Billings Clinic joined the Mayo Clinic Care Network, a collaboration between Mayo Clinic and other health organizations to allow those organizations to access Mayo's clinical expertise. In 2009, the Billings Clinic opened a cancer center, at a cost of $31.9-million. The same year, an outpatient surgery center opened.

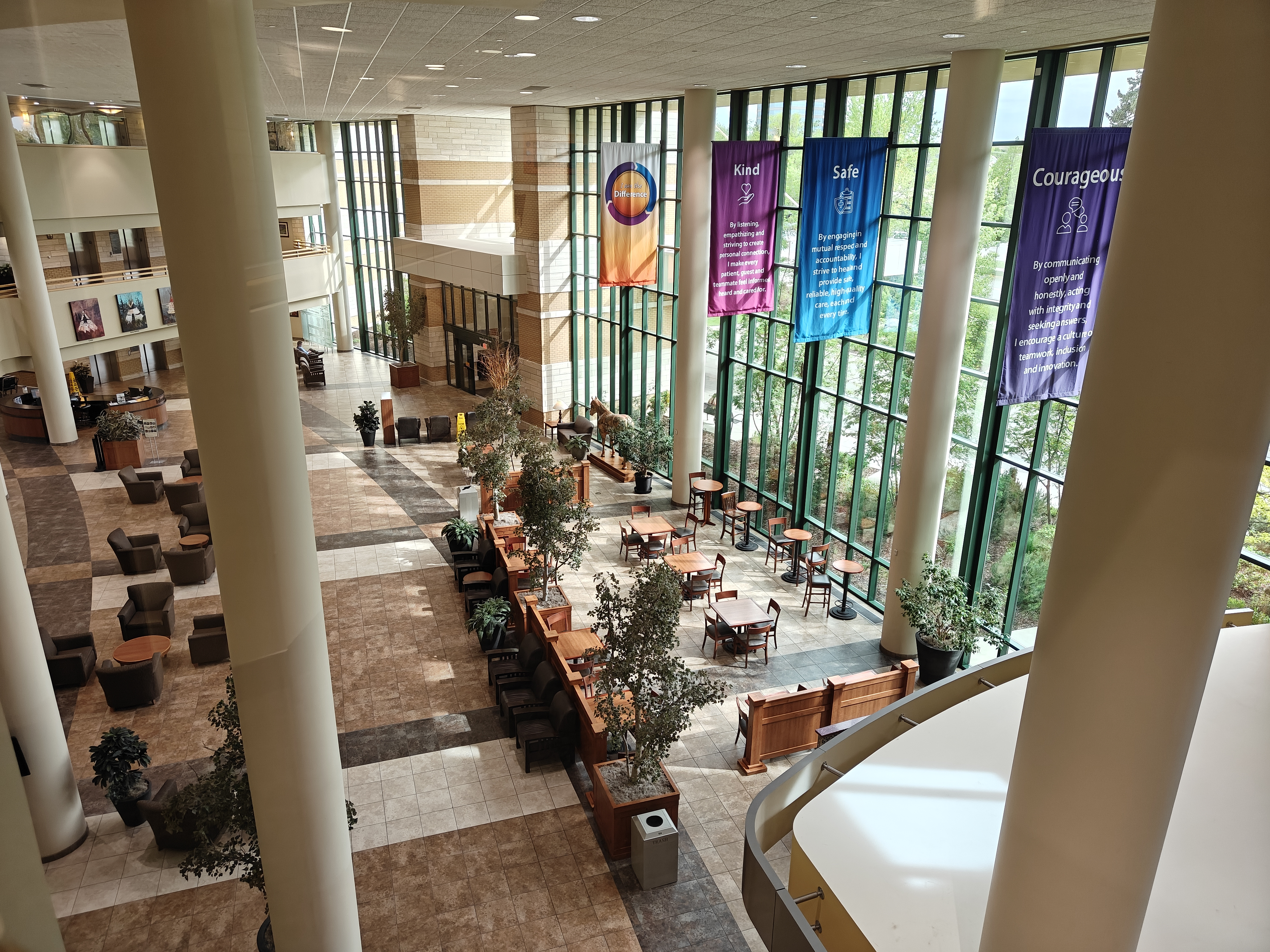
The lobby of the Billings Clinic Commons in downtown Billings, Montana.

In 2021, Billings Clinic was granted their fourth designation as a Magnet Organization. Less than 1% of all hospitals worldwide have earned this designation four times in a row.

In 2023, Billings Clinic was named the Best Hospital in Montana and received its second consecutive 5-star rating from the Center for Medicare and Medicaid (CMS). The hospital was also awarded an "A" safety grade from Leapfrog Group.

Also in 2023, Billings Clinic became the first Level I Trauma Center in Montana & Wyoming and was designated the first ever Comprehensive Trauma Center in Montana.

In 2025, Billings Clinic opened Montana's first & only Surgical Intensive Care Unit to meet the higher-level acute care needs of surgical & trauma patients, along with a Regional Operations Center to enhance communication with the region's rural hospitals & coordinate patient transfers.

Billings Clinic is a DNV-certified Comprehensive Stroke Center, reflecting the highest level of treatment for stroke, and is the region's first accredited Chest Pain Center.

== Residency Programs & Education ==
Billings Clinic is an academic medical center, offering residency programs for nurses, pharmacists & physicians.

In 2014, Billings Clinic established Montana's first internal medicine residency. The program is accredited by the Accreditation Council for Graduate Medical Education.

Beginning July 2021, Billings Clinic began educating psychiatry residents from the University of Washington. The cooperative program has resident physicians begin their first two years of residency in Seattle with the University of Washington and the latter two years of their residency training with the Billings Clinic.

Billings Clinic has long offered a Nurse Residency, a year-long program to support and train new graduate RN's. Billings Clinic also offers two PGY1 Pharmacy Residency Programs.

Billings Clinic operates the largest Community Training Center in Montana, offering medical education for both healthcare employees & members of the public in the surrounding region. Billings Clinic also operates a Simulation & Experiential Learning Lab, using high-fidelity mannequins and medical equipment to simulate real-world medical scenarios.

== See also ==
- List of hospitals in Montana
