= Santa Rosa Memorial Hospital =

Hospital in Santa Rosa, California, United States

- Providence Health & Services

Geography
- Location: Santa Rosa, Sonoma County, California, United States
- Coordinates: 38°26′37″N 122°42′5″W

Organization
- Type: General
- Religious affiliation: Catholic church
- Patron: Sisters of St. Joseph of Orange

Services
- Emergency department: Level II trauma center
- Beds: 338

History
- Opened: 1 January 1950

Links
- Website: www.providence.org/locations/norcal/santa-rosa-memorial-hospital
- Lists: Hospitals in California

Santa Rosa Memorial Hospital is a 338-bed acute care regional hospital located in the city of Santa Rosa, California, which is in Sonoma County. The hospital, known as "Memorial", is part of the Providence Health hospital system. It serves a population of over 500,000 people living in the greater Sonoma County area. Memorial Hospital is the regional Level II Trauma Center for Sonoma County, Lake County, Mendocino County, Napa County, and the Marin County coastal region.

On average Santa Rosa Memorial treats 1,450 patients annually who have suffered serious or life-threatening injuries. In 2009 it had more than 31,000 outpatient emergency department visits and more than 7,200 admissions. Between 1998 and 2010 as a level II trauma center it had treated over 15,000 trauma cases.

== Services ==
The hospital has a 24-hour Emergency Department, and is a Level II Trauma Center. Memorial also has an Intensive Care Nursery affiliated with the UCSF Medical Center.
