= Montana State Hospital =

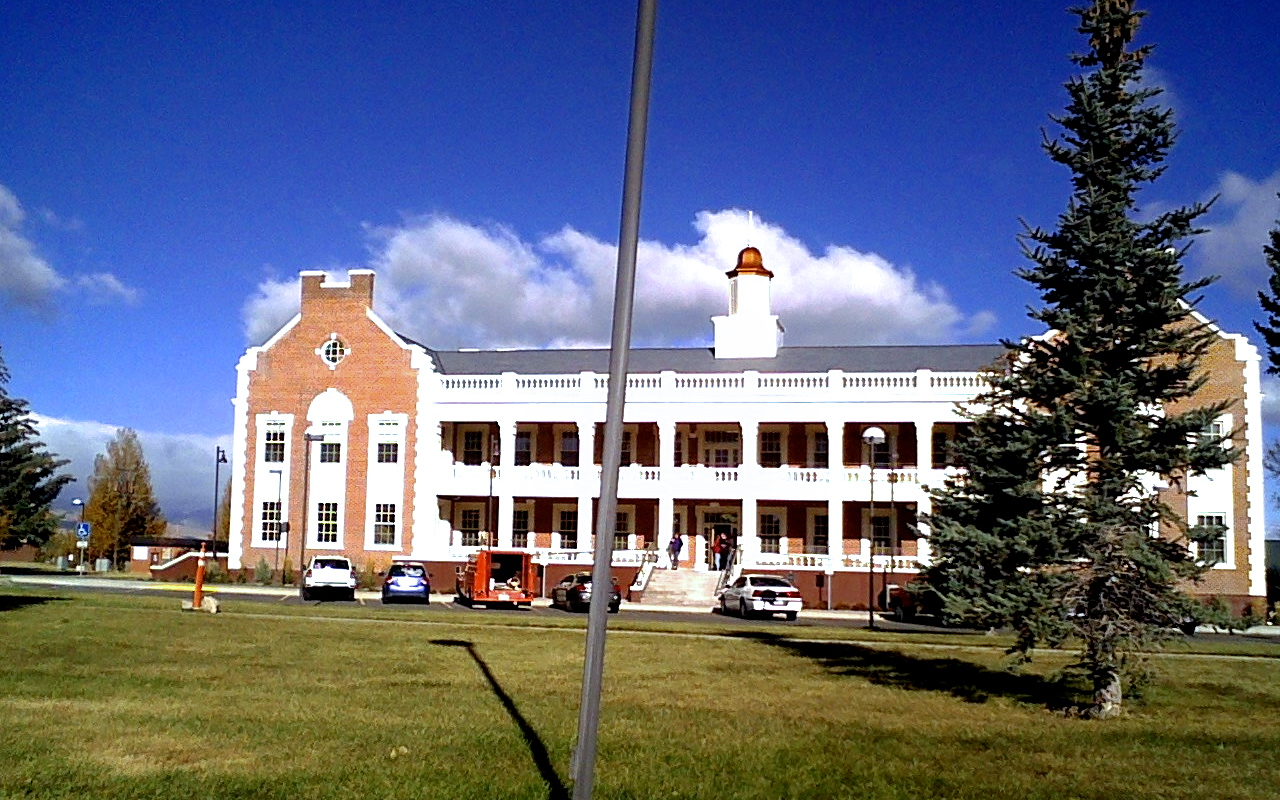
- Montana State Hospital, historic hospital building

Geography
- Location: Warm Springs, Montana, United States
- Coordinates: 46°10′51″N 112°47′28″W

Organization
- Type: Psychiatric hospital

History
- Opened: 1877

Links
- Website: msh.mt.gov
- Lists: Hospitals in Montana

Montana State Hospital is located in Warm Springs, Montana, just off of I-90 near Anaconda, Montana, United States.

The hospital is the only publicly operated psychiatric hospital in the state. It was founded by the territorial government between 1869 and 1877. The hospital was once Montana's largest unincorporated community. Its peak census was in 1954 when the facility housed 1,964 patients.

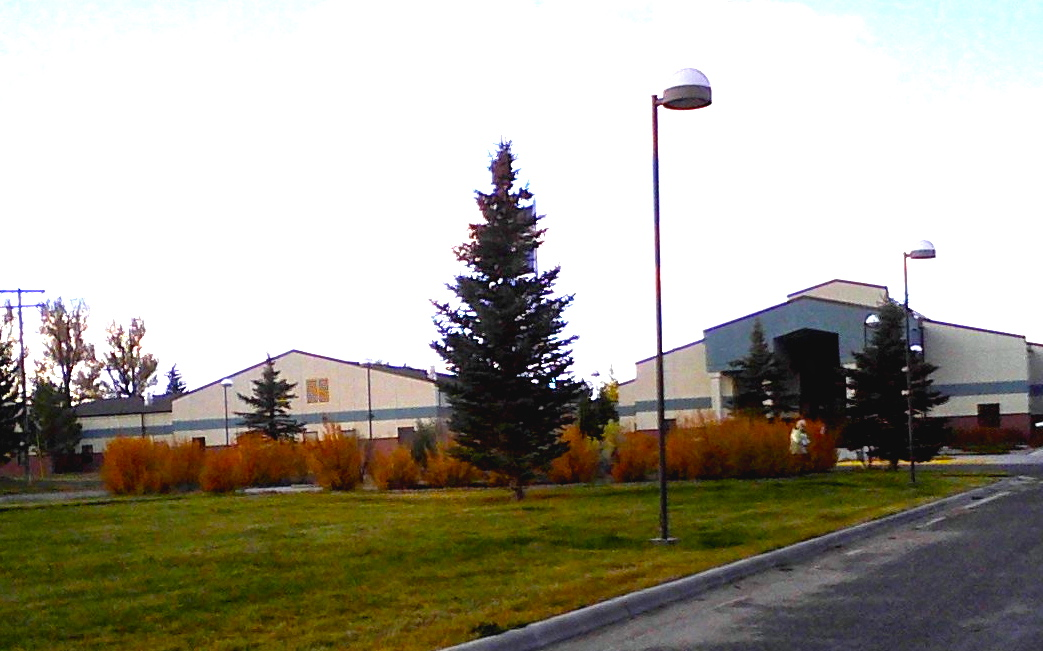
Montana State Hospital, modern facilities

Today, the census averages approximately 200 patients (about 216 in 2023), primarily placed by civil court commitment action. The facility also includes a forensic unit for individuals who have either been found mentally ill or are undergoing evaluation while unfit to proceed. Exceptionally violent patients may also reside on the forensic unit regardless of criminal charges. The hospital is no longer licensed by the State of Montana nor certified for participation in the federal Medicare and Medicaid programs, due to issues with State inspections.

The hospital grounds include a large cemetery, home to at least 3,260 graves. The hospital severely restricts access, so most graves have not been photographed nor completely listed.
