= 2025 Oregon Nurses Association strike =

Health care strike

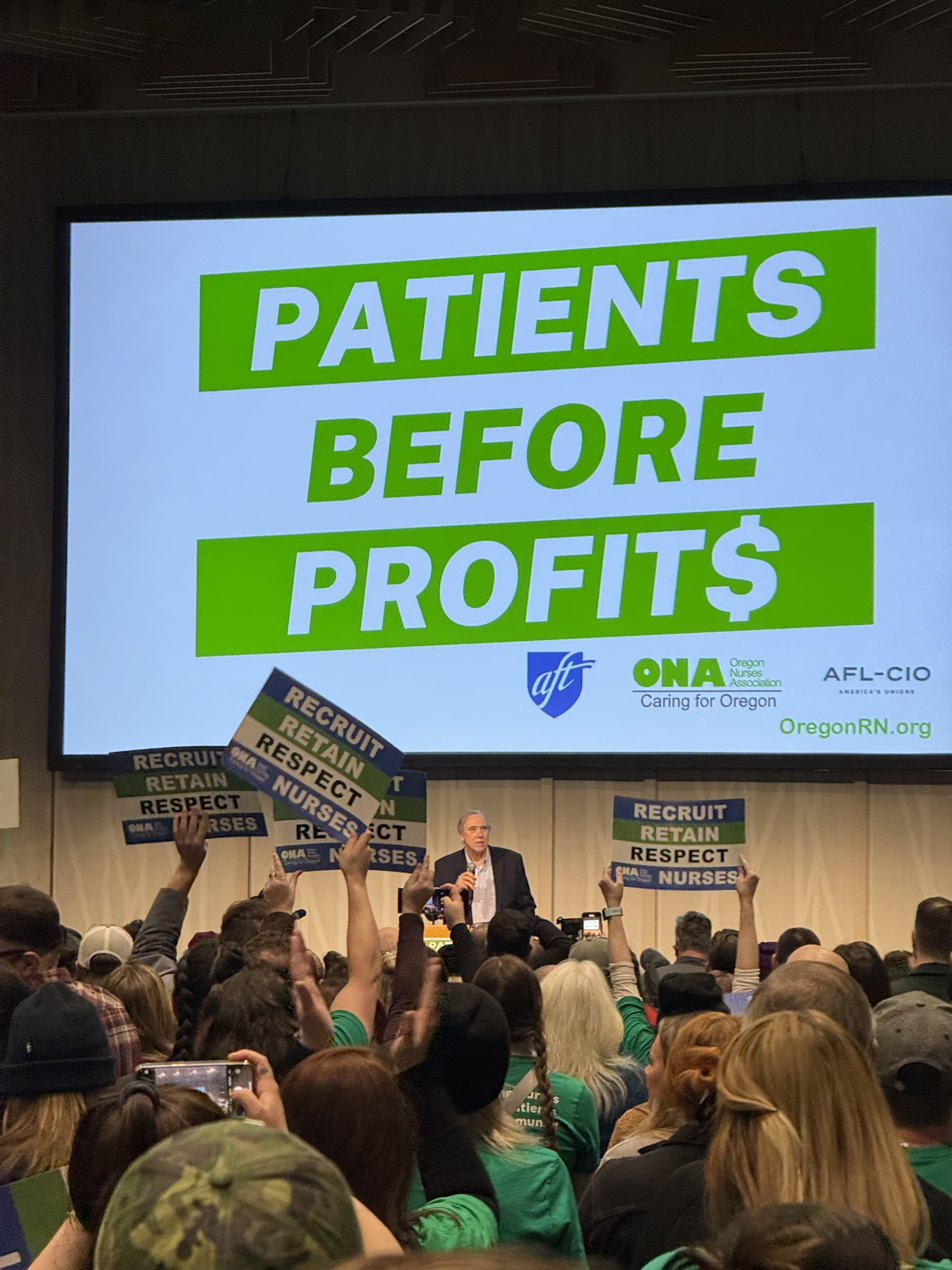
- Senator Jeff Merkley speaking at an Oregon Nurses Association rally on January 11, 2025
- Date: January 10, 2025 - February 24, 2025
- Location: Oregon

In January 2025, health care professionals in the U.S. state of Oregon started a strike against Providence Health & Services. The striking workers are represented by the Oregon Nurses Association The strike was resolved after numerous attempts at negotiation on February 24th, 2025.

The strike lasted 46 days, leaving it the largest healthcare workers' strike in Oregon history. All eight ONA bargaining units agreed to return to ratify the new contract and return to work Thursday, February 26th. Changes to the contract as a result of negotiations included wage increases up to 22%, improved staffing plans, changes to compensation for missed breaks and benefits, and retroactive pay for units with contracts that expired prior to December 2024.
