= North Valley Hospital (Montana) =

Logan Health - Whitefish
- Quorum Health Resources

Geography
- Location: 1600 Hospital Way; Whitefish, Montana 59937, Whitefish, Montana, United States
- Coordinates: 48.38033°N 114.33127°W

Organization
- Type: General medicine; Surgical

Services
- Emergency department: Community trauma center
- Beds: 25

History
- Founded: 1905

Links
- Website: nvhosp.org
- Lists: Hospitals in Montana

Logan Health - Whitefish is a private 501(c)(3) nonprofit general medicine and surgical Critical Access Hospital located in Whitefish, Montana. It is a state-designated community trauma center that serves Whitefish and the broader community of Flathead and Lincoln County. As of 2018, the hospital's chief executive officer is Kevin Abel. The hospital is affiliated with Logan Health, formerly Kalispell Regional Healthcare. It is also a member of the Planetree Alliance. In June 2021, the hospital officially merged with Logan Health and changed its name to Logan Health - Whitefish.

== History ==
Logan Health - Whitefish's history traces back to Whitefish, Montana's first hospital, which opened in 1905. The hospital was owned by Great Northern Railway and Dr. Hugh E. Houston, a Great Northern Railway physician, served as the hospital's first doctor. Its first patients were mostly people injured in railroad accidents. Mr. Peter Gutensohn and Mrs. J.A. Sampson acquired Northern Valley from the railroad in 1912. They operated the hospital until the hospital building was converted into an apartment building in 1923. The town was without a hospital from 1923 until 1936. The building was converted back into a hospital by Mrs. J.A. Earhart.

Dr. Edith Boyd purchased the hospital in 1941 and operated it until 1947. In 1946, the hospital moved locations and was named after Dr. John B. Simons. The hospital was later named North Valley Hospital Auxiliary. Dr. Simons sold his interest in the hospital to a civic board in 1961. North Valley Hospital Auxiliary was renamed Whitefish Memorial Hospital.

A third hospital was planned and broke ground in 1969. That hospital, named North Valley Hospital, opened in July 1974. It was expanded with a 50-bed Extended Care Center in a 1975 renovation, which cost $1.325 million and was funded entirely with bond sales. The hospital was again expanded in 1988. Quorum Health Resources became the hospital's manager in 1990. North Valley Hospital became a member of the Planetree Alliance network of hospitals in 1992. In May 2016, North Valley Hospital became affiliated with the Kalispell Regional Healthcare system.

=== Expansion ===
In 2000, hospital administrators decided to relocate North Valley Hospital. The hospital's new $30 million facility, located on the south end of Whitefish, opened in March 2007. North Valley Hospital built a new facility for North Country Medical Clinic in Eureka, Montana in 2008. That same year, the hospital began operating The Base Lodge Clinic at Whitefish Mountain Resort annually from December until April.

The hospital purchased The Professional Center in Columbia Falls, Montana in August 2010. The center originally opened in 1978 and was renamed North Valley Professional Center following the acquisition. In 2015, the clinic, which offers family medicine and obstetrics, geriatric and pediatric care, reopened at a new 8,700-square-foot location on Talbott Road. North Valley Hospital also opened the West Glacier Clinic in 2010. The clinic is open from June until mid-September. North Valley Hospital acquired Glacier Maternity later that year.

North Valley Embrace Health, a structured outpatient mental health clinic, was opened in 2011. In April 2013, the North Valley Hospital began a $1.7 million expansion, which added a fourth operating room to its main facility. The new operating room included the infrastructure to operate the da Vinci Surgical System. The expansion was completed in October of that year.

North Valley Geriatric Specialty Services opened in January 2014. The hospital also operates North Valley Physical Therapy, a physical therapy and rehabilitation clinic in Columbia Falls, Montana. In September 2014, North Valley Behavioral Health, a division of North Valley Hospital, opened its clinic in Whitefish, Montana, led by J. Douglas Muir, MD, to treat mental health patients. In October 2015, North Valley Hospital announced a collaborative affiliation with Kalispell Regional Healthcare as a result of a joint task force that was launched in July 2013 to explore opportunities for collaboration between the Kalispell and Whitefish hospitals.

== Operations ==
North Valley Hospital has four core departments: emergency department; Center for Minimally Invasive Surgery; Center for Orthopedics; and The Birth Center. North Valley Hospital's emergency department, laboratories and imaging facilities are open 24 hours a day, 7 days a week. The laboratory has been certified by College of American Pathologists certified since 1997. The hospital's Center for Minimally Invasive Surgery utilizes the da Vinci Surgical System and other technologies to make surgical operations as minimally invasive as possible. Doctors at North Valley Hospital began using the da Vinci Surgical System in 2010. The Center for Orthopedics also utilizes computer-assisted surgery and has orthopedic nurse coordinators to assist in patient care. The Birth Center utilizes obstetricians, certified nurse midwives and family practitioners. In 2016, the center underwent an expansion which added 2,730-square feet of new space and upgrades to existing space. North Valley Hospital has a palliative care practice.

The hospital also offers alternative medicine practices such as acupuncture, massage therapy and water birthing.

== Planetree membership ==
North Valley Hospital is a member of the Planetree network of hospitals, which seeks to promote patient-centered care. The network is organized around ten components. Planetree-inspired initiatives at the hospital include a medical library for patients and community members, patient massages, "spiritual care" programs and animal-assisted therapy.

== Recognition ==
- 2013 Becker's Hospital Review—100 Great Places to Work in Healthcare
- 2013 Best Places to Work in the Flathead Valley/Glacier Park Region—First runner-up
- Woman's Choice Award—America's Best Hospitals for Patient Experience in Obstetrics (2013-2014)
- Top 50 Nurse Friendly Hospital (2014)
