= Temple Ahavat Shalom Northridge =

Reform Jewish synagogue in Northridge, California, US

- Location in Los Angeles, California

Religion
- Affiliation: Reform Judaism
- Ecclesiastical or organisational status: Synagogue
- Leadership: Rabbi Becky Hoffman
- Status: Active

Location
- Location: Northridge, Los Angeles, Southern California
- Country: United States
- Coordinates: 34°16′36″N 118°31′45″W

Architecture
- Type: Synagogue architecture
- Established: 1965 (as a congregation)
- Completed: 1973 (Martyrs Building); c. 1980s (Rinaldi Place)

Website
- tasnorthridge.org

Temple Ahavat Shalom Northridge (Hebrew for "Love of peace") is a Reform Jewish congregation and synagogue at 18200 Rinaldi Place, in Northridge, in San Fernando Valley, Southern California, in the United States. The congregation was established in 1965 and is affiliated with the Union for Reform Judaism.

== History ==
Temple Ahavat Shalom Northridge, abbreviated as TAS Northridge, was established in 1965 as the result of a merger between Temple Beth Torah and the North Valley Reform Congregation, both Reform synagogues in the north San Fernando Valley. Land was purchased to the south of the future path of California State Route 118, and a temporary multi-purpose building was erected in 1969. The founding rabbis were Fred Krinsky and Shimon Paskow. They were succeeded by Rabbi Allen Secher, who served from 1967 to 1971 and was the first member of the clergy to introduce multi-media worship to the synagogue experience.

Secher was followed in 1971 by Rabbi Richard Leviton, and in 1973 by Rabbi Solomon F. Kleinman. Among Kleinman's major accomplishments were the establishment of a preschool and the completion of a sanctuary-social hall complex to coincide with Rosh Hashanah and Yom Kippur in 1978. The complex was designed by the architectural firm of Brent, Robbins and Bown. The ark, which contains a Torah rescued from the Holocaust, was designed by artist Joseph Young, who also designed the Triforium in downtown Los Angeles. One of Kleinman's rabbinic interns from Hebrew Union College-Jewish Institute of Religion was Denise Eger. In 2015, Rabbi Eger became the first member of the LGBTQIA+ community to head the Central Conference of American Rabbis, the professional organization of Reform rabbis in the United States and Canada.

After Kleinman retired in 1986, he served as rabbi emeritus until his death in 2015 at age 95. He was succeeded as senior rabbi in 1986 by Jerald M. Brown. Brown inspired the building of an education center, introduced confirmation for 11th graders, and initiated Tuesday morning Torah study. Barry M. Lutz, who became the temple's senior rabbi in 2008 and led congregational trips to Israel and sites of Jewish historical interest in Central Europe, left TAS Northridge in 2017. Two interim rabbis followed: Rabbi Liat Yardeni-Funk from January through June 2018, and Rabbi Arturo Kalfus from July 2018 through June 2020.

On July 1, 2020, Rabbi Rebecca Hoffman became the senior rabbi at TAS Northridge.
