= Clark Fork Valley Hospital =

Coordinates: 47.46852°N 114.88803°W

Geography
- Location: Plains, Montana, United States

Organization
- Care system: Private Non-Profit
- Type: Community
- Affiliated university: None

Services
- Beds: 16

History
- Founded: 1971

Links
- Website: http://www.cfvh.org/
- Lists: Hospitals in Montana

Clark Fork Valley Hospital is a full-service community hospital in Plains, Montana, USA. The hospital features a 24/7 emergency department, Intensive Care Unit, Family Birthing Center, and a complete imaging department anchored by a multi-slice GE lightspeed CT scanner, 3-dimensional ultrasound, echocardiography and all digital imaging. Through a multi-hospital cooperative (MONIDA) a 1.5 tesla GE MRI Unit is on site two days weekly.

Other services include, general surgery, surgical oncology, total joint replacement, orthopedic surgery, cataract surgery, and urology.

The hospital operates three family medicine rural health clinics in Thompson Falls, Plains and Hot Springs. All these sites offer family medicine and physical therapy services on site.
