= Providence Health & Services =

Healthcare system headquartered in Renton, Washington

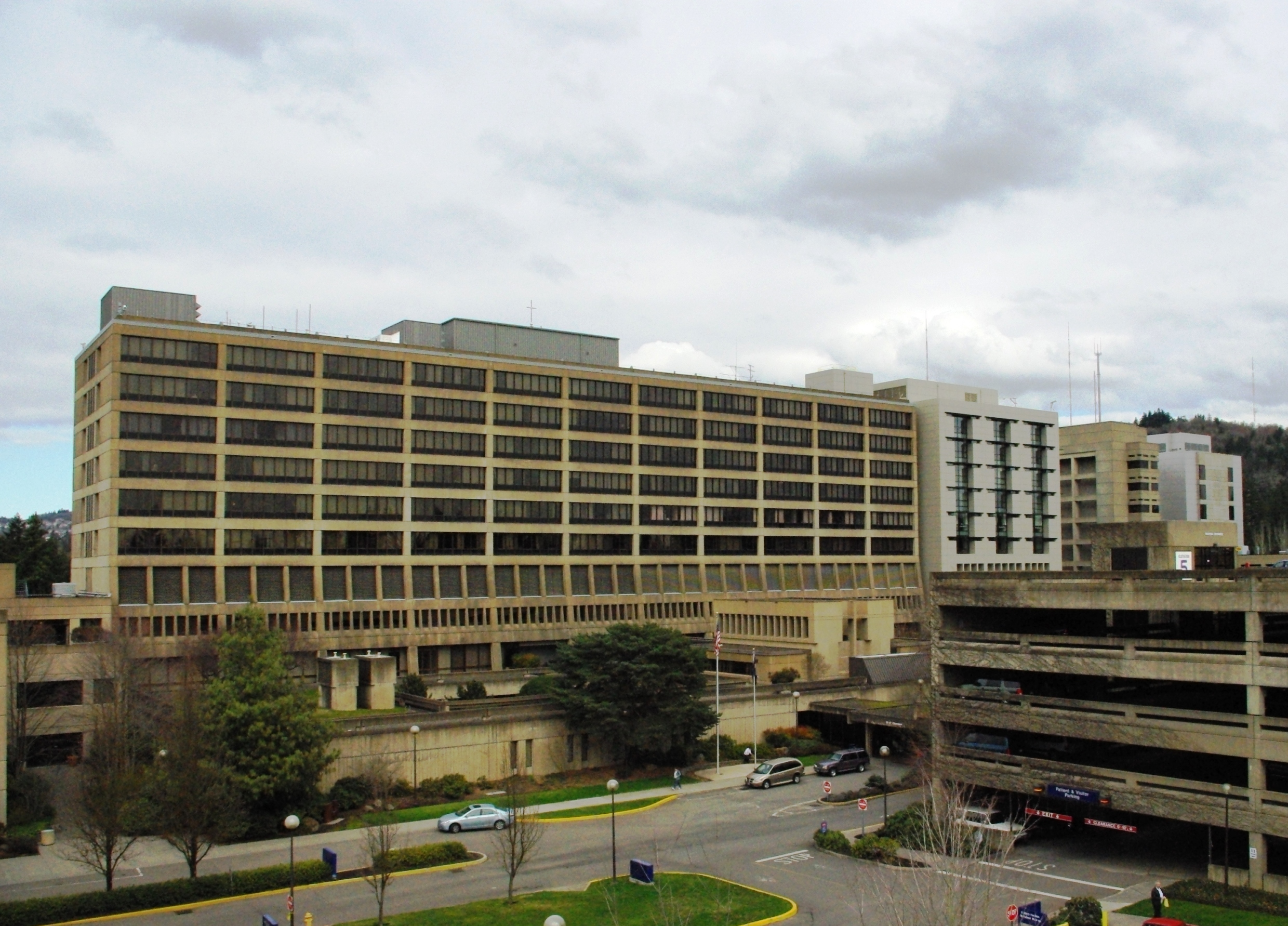
- Providence St. Vincent's Hospital located in Portland, Oregon
- Industry: Healthcare
- Founded: 1859; 167 years ago
- Founder: Sisters of Providence
- Headquarters: Renton, Washington, United States
- Area served: Western United States
- Key people: Erik G. Wexler (president and CEO)
- Services: Acute care, surgical, medical clinics, hospice, home care, nursing homes, assisted living
- Revenue: US$28.7 billion (2023)
- Total assets: 5,566,177,800 United States dollar (2011)
- Number of employees: 120,000
- Website: providence.org

Providence Health & Services is a not-for-profit Catholic healthcare system headquartered in Renton, Washington. The health system includes 51 hospitals, more than 800 non-acute facilities, and numerous assisted living facilities in the western half of the United States (Alaska, Washington, Oregon, California, Montana, New Mexico, and Texas). Providence Health & Services was founded by the Sisters of Providence in 1859 and merged with St. Joseph Health in 2016.

== History ==
Providence Health System was established by the Sisters of Providence, a community of Roman Catholic sisters founded in Montreal, Quebec in the 1850s, who established a mission at Fort Vancouver and a hospital in Portland, Oregon. In 1859, the Sisters incorporated their work, creating the network of health care services known as Providence Health & Services. In 1891, they founded St. Elizabeth Hospital (now PeaceHealth Southwest Medical Center), the Pacific Northwest's first permanent hospital, which opened with 13 beds. The Sisters later established several schools and hospitals in Washington, Montana, Oregon, Alaska, British Columbia, and California.

Dominican Network, a network of hospitals in Washington State, joined Providence Services in 1993. Six Providence Services hospitals incorporated within a single entity, Providence Health Care, in 1998.

In 2003, Health Management Associates purchased Providence Health System's Central Washington properties. These purchases included Providence Yakima Medical Center (formerly St. Elizabeth) and Toppenish Hospital.

Providence Health & Services formed in 2006 as a result of the merger of Providence Health System and Providence Services. Management shifted from the Sisters of Providence to Providence Ministries, a council of sponsors, in 2009.

In 2012, Providence acquired Swedish Health Services in Seattle, Washington, promoting Rod Hochman from C.E.O. of Swedish to President and C.E.O. of Providence in 2013. In 2014, Providence entered a similar partnership with Pacific Medical Centers, which joined Swedish as part of Providence's Western HealthConnect division. In 2016, Providence merged with California-based St. Joseph Health to create Providence St. Joseph Health. In 2019, plans were announced to rebrand assets under the Providence brand, and in 2020, Health Management Resources was acquired from Merck & Co., Inc.

Providence St. Joseph was the first U.S. health system to treat a patient with COVID-19 in Washington state.

== Organization ==
Providence Medical Group, the "physician division" of Providence Health & Services, operates more than 250 clinics in neighborhoods throughout Alaska, California, Montana, Oregon and Washington, and employs over 1,600 physicians with expertise in family medicine, internal medicine, pediatrics, obstetrics/gynecology, dermatology and other specialties.

Providence Health & Services, the parent organization, provides outpatient services, transitional care, home and hospice care, substance abuse programs, mental health treatment, prevention and wellness programs, long-term care, and assisted living and housing. Providence Health Plan provides or administers health coverage to more than 375,000 members nationwide.

Providence has 51 hospitals and over 1,100 clinics in seven U.S. states—Alaska, Washington, Montana, Oregon, California, New Mexico, and Texas—as of 2022. These facilities include the following:

=== Alaska ===
- Providence Alaska Medical Center
- Providence Kodiak Island Medical Center
- Providence Seward Medical and Care Center
- Providence Valdez Medical Center

=== Washington ===
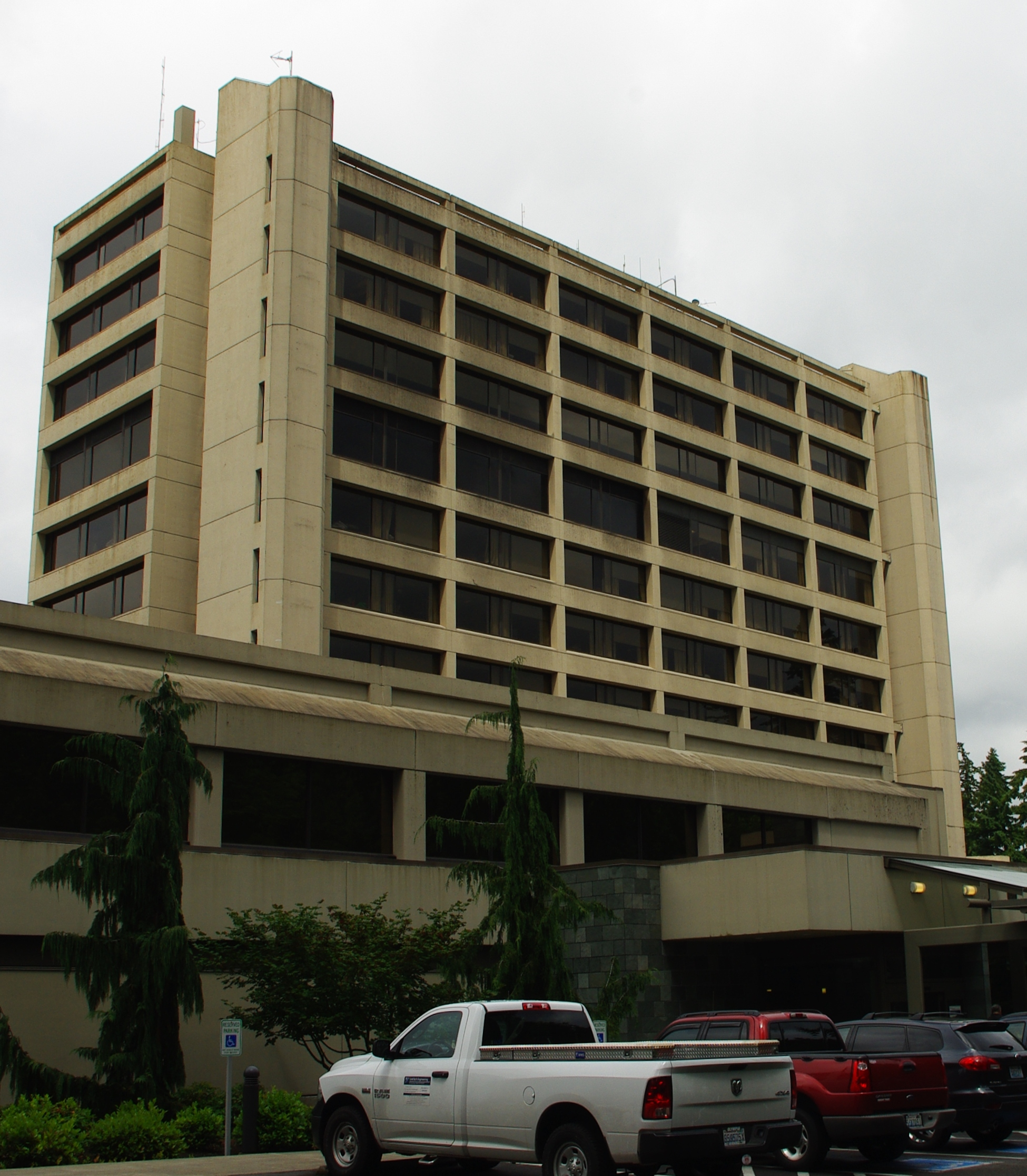
Providence St. Peter Hospital in Olympia

- Providence Centralia Hospital
- Providence Regional Medical Center Everett
- Providence St. Peter Hospital
- Swedish Health Services
- Kadlec Regional Medical Center

The following were originally part of the Dominican Network and came into Providence Health & Services upon its formation in 2006

- Deer Park Health Center & Hospital
- Holy Family Hospital of Spokane
- Mount Carmel Hospital of Colville
- Providence Sacred Heart Medical Center and Children's Hospital (Spokane)
- St. Joseph's Hospital of Chewelah
- St. Mary Medical Center of Walla Walla

=== Montana ===
- St. Joseph Medical Center
- St. Patrick Hospital and Health Sciences Center

=== Oregon ===
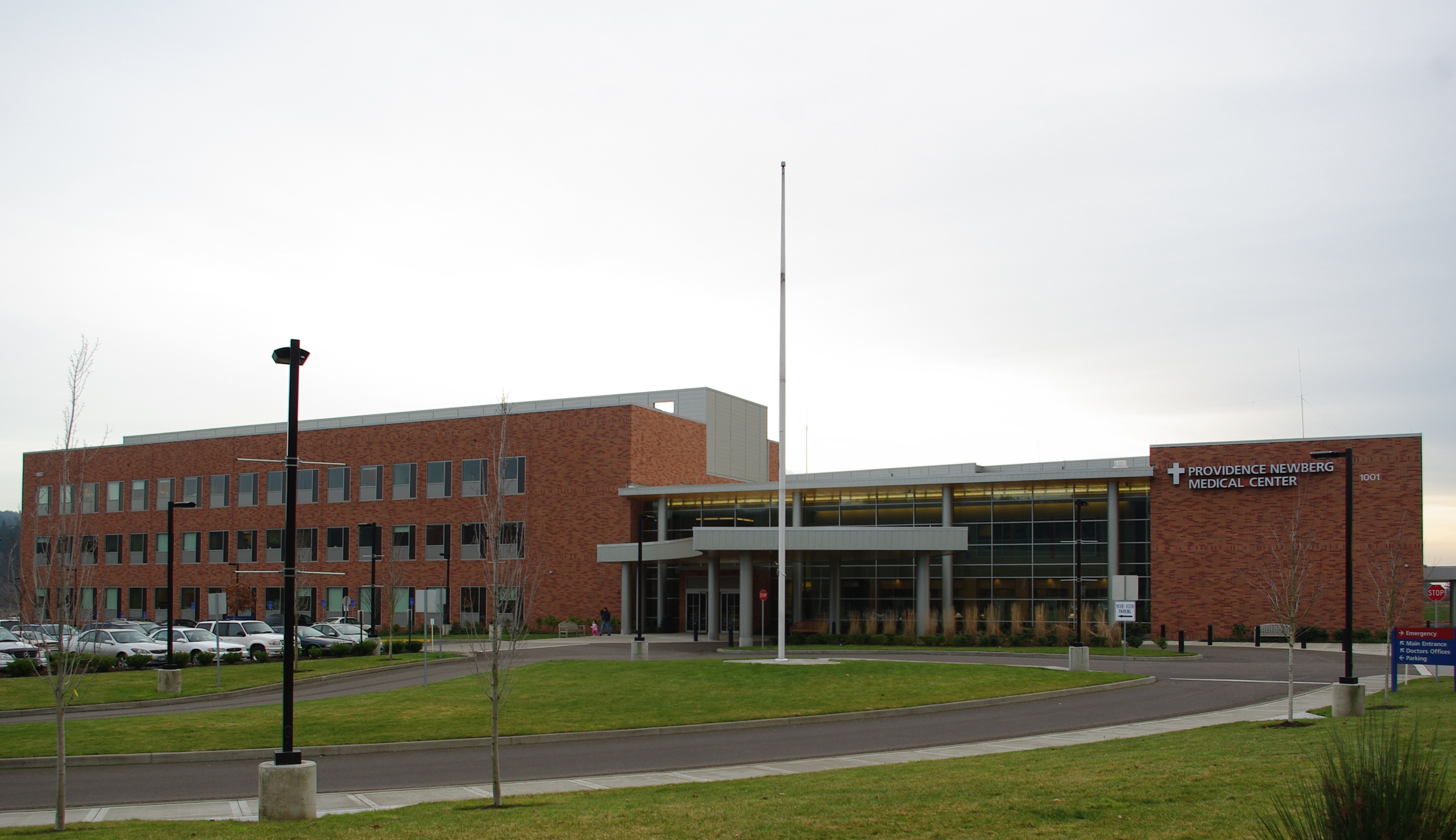
Providence Newberg Medical Center

- Providence Hood River Memorial Hospital
- Providence Medford Medical Center
- Providence Milwaukie Hospital
- Providence Newberg Medical Center
- Providence Portland Medical Center
- Providence Seaside Hospital
- Providence St. Vincent Medical Center
- Providence Willamette Falls Medical Center

=== California ===
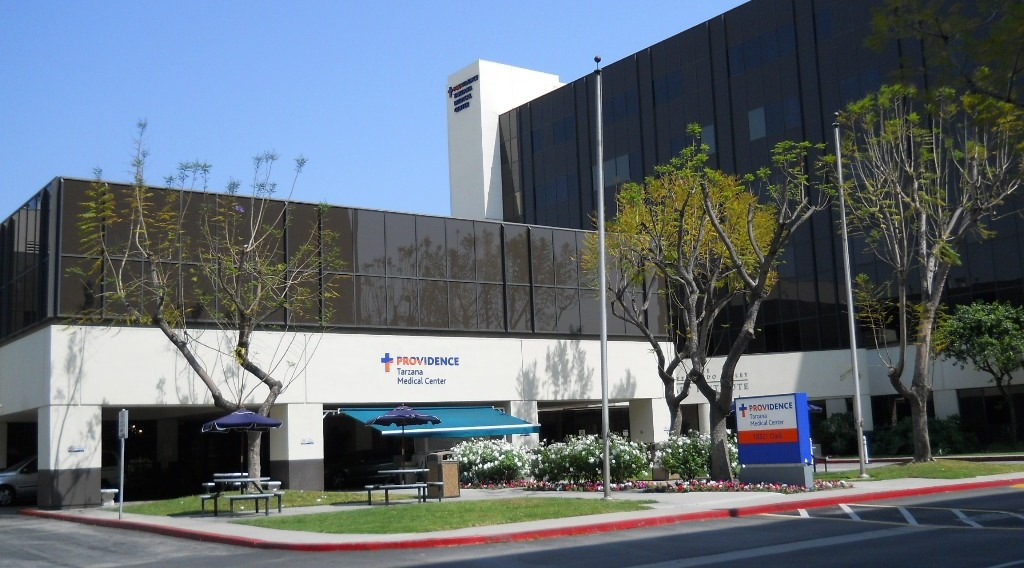
Providence Cedars-Sinai Tarzana Medical Center

- Providence Holy Cross Medical Center
- Providence Little Company of Mary Medical Center (San Pedro)
- Providence Little Company of Mary Medical Center (Torrance)
- Petaluma Valley Hospital
- Providence Saint Joseph Medical Center
- Providence Cedars-Sinai Tarzana Medical Center
- Providence Medical Institute
- Providence Saint John's Health Center
- Providence Redwood Memorial Hospital
- Queen of the Valley Medical Center
- Santa Rosa Memorial Hospital
- St. Mary's Medical Center-Apple Valley
- Providence Mission Hospital Mission Viejo
- Providence Mission Hospital Laguna Beach
- St. Joseph Hospital Orange
- St. Jude Medical Center (Fullerton)
- St. Joseph Hospital – Eureka

=== New Mexico ===
- Hobbs Hospital

=== Texas ===
- Covenant Medical Center – Lubbock
- Covenant Children's Hospital – Lubbock
- Grace Medical Center – Lubbock
- Covenant Health Plainview
- Covenant Health Levelland

=== Hyderabad, India ===
Providence set up its Global Capability Center under the name of Providence India in Hyderabad in 2020. They mainly deal with the development of software tools and services that are used by the broader organization in the operations in the US.

== Controversies ==
In 2020, a Portland, Oregon, area physician assistant who had been barred from seeing female patients of child-bearing age because she refused to offer them contraceptive care went on to refuse to provide a "young" patient with emergency contraception. She was terminated after further refusing to agree to refer patients to other providers for those services which she did not wish to offer herself. Her refusals to provide contraceptive care were based on her interpretation of Catholicism. Providence Medical Group did not respond to the Catholic News Agency's request for comment.

According to a New York Times investigation of multiple health systems published during May 2020, Providence obtained more than half of a billion in government funds which were intended to keep health care providers afloat during the coronavirus pandemic. At that time, Providence Health System had nearly $12 billion in cash reserves. By making investments with that fund, it generated approximately $1 billion in revenue per year.

A second Times investigation found that Providence had instituted a program created by McKinsey & Company to request payments from patients to cover the cost of care left over following Medicare and Medicaid reimbursement. Hospital staff were reportedly instructed to negotiate payment plans, informing patients about financial assistance as a final option. Those who did not pay were sent to debt collection, a practice for which the Attorney General of Washington filed suit, alleging that they were in violation of state laws which entitled low-income patients to care with no copay. Providence countered the lawsuit, but stated they would stop using debt collectors and that they would refund 760 patients and work with credit agencies to “reverse any negative impact on credit.”

On February 1, 2024, Washington State Attorney General Bob Ferguson announced that Providence "must forgive more than $137 million in medical debt and refund more than $20 million to patients the company billed for services despite knowing they likely qualified for free or reduced-cost health care. The $157.8 million resolution will provide full refunds, plus interest, and debt forgiveness for 99,446 individuals. It is the largest resolution of its kind in the country."

On April 18, 2024, a King County Superior Court judge ruled that Providence willfully underpaid over 33,000 hourly employees between September 2018 and May 2023. Providence was ordered to pay a total of approximately $220 million to the impacted employees. In a statement concerning the lawsuit, Providence stated their intention to appeal the ruling.

On September 30, 2024, the Attorney General of California Rob Bonta announced a lawsuit against Providence St. Joseph Hospital for denying patient emergency abortion care. The lawsuit alleged that the hospital was in violation of multiple laws including California’s Emergency Services Law (the state level analogue to the federal EMTALA statute). According to Bonta, Providence St. Joseph Hospital refused to provide an emergency abortion to a patient experiencing a miscarriage and diagnosed with preterm premature rupture of membranes (PPROM), which is a serious life-threatening condition. According to Bonta, the patient, Anna Nusslock, was told she should request a $40,000 medical-helicopter flight to University of California, San Francisco, a facility 271 miles away, to receive treatment because had she undertaken the five-hour drive, she would "hemorrhage and die before you get to a place that could help you." She says she was provided a bucket of towels by Providence St. Joseph's staff, and her husband drove to a local community hospital where she received the procedure.

== See also ==
- 2025 Oregon Nurses Association strike
