= Frank Ackerman =

American economist (1946–2019)

- Born: October 17, 1946; Madison, Wisconsin, U.S.
- Died: July 15, 2019 (aged 72); Cambridge, Massachusetts, U.S.
- Education: Swarthmore College; Harvard University
- Scientific career
- Fields: Economics
- Website: frankackerman.com

Francis Hopkirk Ackerman (October 17, 1946 – July 15, 2019) was an American economist known for his work in environmental economics, particularly in the areas of climate change, social accounting and development. He is also known as a founder of the magazine Dollars & Sense.

== Life ==
Ackerman was born in Madison, Wisconsin, the son of Eugene Ackerman and Dorothy née Hopkirk. He received his bachelor's degree in mathematics and economics at Swarthmore College, followed by a PhD in economics from Harvard University. He lived most of his life in Somerville, Massachusetts and Cambridge, Massachusetts.

== Writings ==
A prominent critic of conventional economic approaches to climate and their use of cost–benefit analysis, he has written for academic and popular presses and directed studies for government agencies and nongovernmental organizations.

Ackerman's last books were NAFTA 2.0: For People or Polluters? A Climate Denier's Trade Deal versus a Clean Energy Economy (2018) and Worst-Case Economics: Extreme Events in Climate and Finance (Anthem Press, 2017). His other books include Can We Afford the Future? Economics for a Warming World (Zed Books, 2009), Poisoned for Pennies: The Economics of Toxics and Precaution (Island Press, 2008), and Priceless: On Knowing the Price of Everything and the Value of Nothing (The New Press, 2004, with Lisa Heinzerling).

== Institutions ==
Ackerman was a senior economist at Synapse Energy Economics, a public interest-oriented consulting firm in Cambridge, MA. Before joining Synapse in 2012, he held research positions at the Stockholm Environment Institute's US Center, at Tufts University's Global Development and Environment Institute, and at the Tellus Institute. He taught at Massachusetts Institute of Technology, Tufts University and the University of Massachusetts.

Ackerman was a co-founder and steering committee member of the Economics for Equity and the Environment Network, and a member scholar of the Center for Progressive Reform. He was a co-founder and editor of the magazine Dollars & Sense.
