= Providence Saint Joseph Medical Center =

Coordinates: 34.1550°N 118.3266°W

- Providence Health & Services
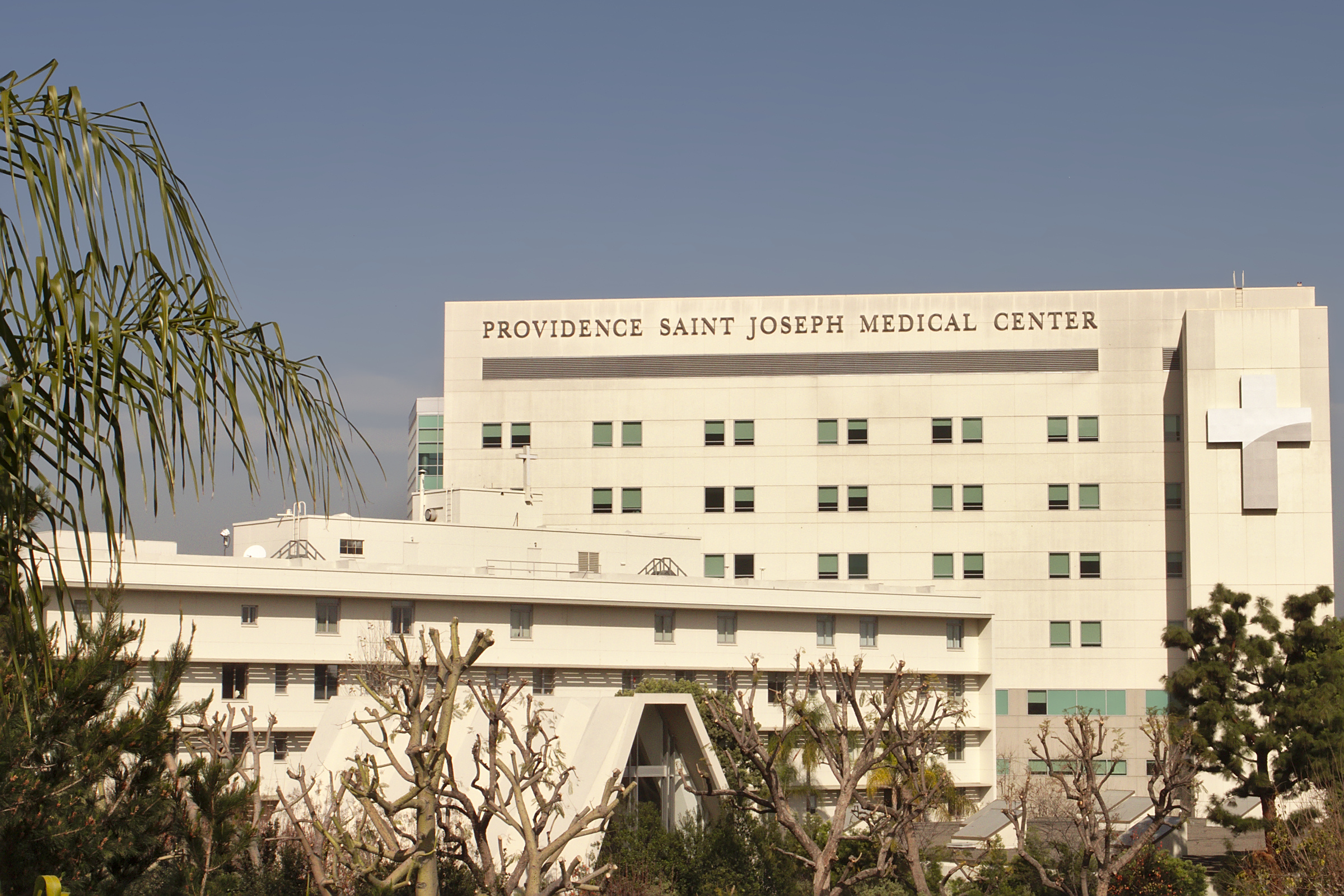

Geography
- Location: Burbank, California, United States

Organization
- Care system: Private
- Type: Community
- Affiliated university: None

Services
- Beds: 446

History
- Founded: 1943

Links
- Website: www.providence.org/saintjoseph
- Lists: Hospitals in California

Providence Saint Joseph Medical Center is a Catholic hospital in Burbank, California. The hospital has 446 beds, and is part of Providence Health & Services. Its address is 501 South Buena Vista Street, Burbank, California 91505. On the opposite side of Buena Vista Street from the hospital is the world headquarters of The Walt Disney Company. The hospital is accredited by the Commission on Accreditation of Rehabilitation Facilities (CARF).

== History ==
Providence Saint Joseph Medical Center in Burbank is affiliated with Providence Health & Services, a large not-for-profit health system based in Renton, Washington. The Burbank location was founded in 1943 by the Sisters of Providence.

PSJMC has more than 400 patient beds, and it offers a wide variety of medical and health services to people in the San Fernando Valley. Providence Saint Joseph is one of the largest employers in the San Fernando Valley, and the hospital has over 650 physicians on staff and close to 2,500 total employees.

Annually, Providence Saint Joseph treats tens of thousands of patients, including those who seek emergency services in its emergency room, special care for medical conditions, and preventative care from its physicians.

Providence Saint Joseph Medical Center also offers a wide variety of classes and special educational events. Classes include yoga, breastfeeding, Pilates, heart care, Lamaze, and a number of other special programs, lectures, and classes held throughout the year.

In 1977, it was the location of The Incredible Hulk 1978-1982 TV series, used for the Culver Institute Radiology Department.

== Leadership ==
Kelly Linden was the Chief Executive at Providence Saint Joseph Medical Center up until May 14, 2021. Linden was responsible for the main medical center, the Roy and Patricia Disney Family Cancer Center, as well as various offsite laboratories.

Eric Wexler is vice president and Chief Executive for Providence Health & Services, Southern California. He is responsible for one of the region's largest health care systems that includes Providence Saint Joseph Medical Center, Burbank; Providence Holy Cross Medical Center, Mission Hills; Providence Tarzana Medical Center, Tarzana; Providence Saint John's Health Center, Santa Monica; Providence Little Company of Mary Medical Center, Torrance; Providence Little Company of Mary Medical Center, San Pedro; Providence Medical Institute; Providence TrinityCare Hospice; Providence High School; as well as several skilled nursing and ambulatory facilities. Providence Health & Services is a not-for-profit Catholic health care system, and has more than 12,000 employees, physicians and volunteers.

From 2002 to 2010, Arnold Schaffer was Chief Executive of Providence Health & Services California. Prior to Schaffer, from 1996 to 1999, Michael Madden was CEO for the Providence Health System LA Service Area. Prior to this, he was chief executive of Providence Saint Joseph Medical Center since 1993. Before coming to Providence, he worked for the Sisters of Mercy Health Corporation in Farmington, Michigan, as executive vice president, Central Michigan Region. He received his M.A. in hospital and health administration from the University of Minnesota in 1968. In 1985, he attended the six-week Advanced Management Program at Harvard Business School.

Madden is immediate-past chairman of the board of the California Healthcare Association and the immediate-past board chair of the Alliance of Catholic Health Care Systems. He is also the former chairman of the board of the Hospital Association of Southern California. He is the board chairman of the Sycamores, a program in Pasadena for disturbed boys, and aboard member of the Providence High School board of regents.

Prior to Madden, James E. Sauer Jr., FACHE was the CEO of Providence Saint Joseph Medical Center from 1979 to 1992. Prior to his retirement, Sauer led a series of expansions of the facility and the establishment of a major cancer center.
