= List of hospitals in Montana =

List of hospitals in Montana (U.S. state), grouped by city and sorted by hospital name.

== Anaconda ==
- Community Hospital of Anaconda

== Baker ==
- Fallon Medical Complex

== Big Sandy ==
- Big Sandy Medical Center

== Big Sky ==
- Big Sky Medical Center

== Big Timber ==
- Pioneer Medical Center

== Billings ==
- Billings Clinic
- St. Vincent Regional Hospital

== Boulder ==
- Montana Developmental Center

== Bozeman ==
- Bozeman Health Deaconess Hospital
- Student Health Service Montana State University

== Butte ==
- St. James Healthcare

== Chester ==
- Liberty County Hospital and Nursing Home

== Choteau ==
- Teton Medical Center

== Circle ==
- McCone County Health Center

== Columbus ==
- Stillwater Billings Clinic

== Conrad ==
- Pondera Medical Center

== Crow Agency ==
- Crow/Northern Cheyenne Hospital

== Culbertson ==
- Roosevelt Memorial Medical Center

== Cut Bank ==
- Northern Rockies Medical Center

== Deer Lodge ==
- Montana State Prison Infirmary
- Powell County Medical Center

== Dillon ==
- Barrett Hospital & HealthCare

== Ekalaka ==
- Dahl Memorial Healthcare Association

== Ennis ==
- Madison Valley Hospital

== Forsyth ==
- Rosebud Health Care Center

== Fort Benton ==
- Missouri River Medical Center

== Fort Harrison ==
- Veterans Affairs Montana Health Care System

== Glasgow ==
- Frances Mahon Deaconess Hospital

== Glendive ==
- Glendive Medical Center

== Great Falls ==
- Benefis Health System
- Central Montana Surgical Hospital

== Hamilton ==
- Bitterroot Health-Daly Hospital

== Hardin ==
- Big Horn County Memorial Hospital

== Harlem ==
- Fort Belknap U. S. Public Health Service Indian Hospital

== Harlowton ==
- Wheatland Memorial Hospital

== Havre ==
- Northern Montana Hospital

== Helena ==
- Shodair Children's Hospital
- St. Peter's Hospital

== Jordan ==
- Garfield County Health Center

== Kalispell ==
- Health Center Northwest
- Kalispell Regional Medical Center

== Lewistown ==
- Central Montana Medical Center

== Libby ==
- Cabinet Peaks Medical Center
- St John's Lutheran Hospital

== Livingston ==
- Livingston Healthcare

== Malta ==
- Phillips County Hospital

== Miles City ==
- Holy Rosary Healthcare

== Missoula ==
- Community Medical Center
- St. Patrick Hospital and Health Sciences Center
- University of Montana Health Service

== Philipsburg ==
- Granite County Medical Center

== Plains ==
- Clark Fork Valley Hospital

== Plentywood ==
- Sheridan Memorial Hospital

== Polson ==
- St. Joseph Medical Center (Montana)

== Poplar ==
- Poplar Community Hospital

== Red Lodge ==
- Beartooth Hospital and Health Center

== Ronan ==
- St. Luke Community Hospital

== Roundup ==
- Roundup Memorial Healthcare

== Saint Mary ==
- U.S. Public Health Service Blackfeet Community Hospital

== Scobey ==
- Daniels Memorial Healthcare Center

== Shelby ==
- Logan Health - Shelby

== Sheridan ==
- Ruby Valley Hospital

== Sidney ==
- Sidney Health Center

== Superior ==
- Mineral Community Hospital

== Terry ==
- Prairie Community Health Center

== Townsend ==
- Broadwater Health Center

== Warmsprings ==
- Montana State Hospital

== White Sulphur Springs ==
- Mountainview Medical Center

== Whitefish ==
- North Valley Hospital

== Wolf Point ==
- Trinity Hospital
