= Providence St. Peter Hospital =

Coordinates: 47°03′09″N 122°50′52″W

- Providence Health & Services
- Providence St. Peter Hospital Tower, 2026

Geography
- Location: 413 Lilly Rd NE, Olympia, Washington, United States

Organization
- Type: Teaching

Services
- Beds: 372

Helipads
- Helipad: (IATA: 8WA4)

History
- Founded: 1887

Links
- Website: Providence St. Peter Hospital
- Lists: Hospitals in Washington state

Providence St. Peter Hospital is located in the Lilly Road Medical District of Olympia, Washington and is Providence Health & Services’s eleventh largest Washington state hospital. The health facility features 372 beds in various units and wings, including a medical and surgical tower, an emergency department with a mental health evaluation unit, a psychiatry building, and a critical care unit. The non-profit hospital was founded by the Sisters of Charity of Providence in 1887.

== History ==
The Sisters of Charity of Providence (SCP) opened a boarding school in Olympia in 1881. Afterwards, residents requested the organization build a hospital in the city. After raising over $2,000 in local subscriptions, construction began in April 1887. The hospital was opened by the SCP on September 23, 1887, at an eight-room building in downtown Olympia on the modern-day grounds of the Washington State Capitol campus. A nursing school was added in 1919; the school closed in 1953 due to a loss of accreditation. The original hospital was replaced in 1923 (Note: The opening year of the new Providence St. Peter Hospital is also reported as 1924.) by a new building located on present-day Capitol Way with a capacity for 100 patients.

By the 1960s, St. Peter Hospital was deemed insufficient for the growing South Sound region and a new hospital was planned under a community board formed in 1965. Constructed at a cost of $6 million, the facility originally contained 150 beds. The current, 12-story hospital building on Lilly Road opened on January 6, 1971<

== Facilities and care ==
Emergency Room entrance, 2026

As of 2025, Providence St. Peter Hospital contains a total of 372 licensed beds between a critical care unit, emergency services, and the medical and surgical tower. The hospital also has observational beds located in a mental health evaluation unit and a psychiatry building.

== Departments and services ==
Emilie Gamelin Pavilion, 2026

- Regional Cancer Center
- Chemical Dependency Center (Off Campus)
- Diagnostic Imaging
- Emergency Department- A Level III trauma center
- Family Birth Center (Located in the Lower Level)
- Regional Heart Program
- Neuroscience Center
- Neurosurgery Clinic
- Orthopaedic Healing Center
- Outpatient Surgery
- Pediatrics
- Physical Medicine and Rehabilitation (Located in the Emilie Gamelin Pavilion)
- Psychiatry Services
- Senior Services
- Sexual Assault Clinic
- Tattoo removal services
- Women's Services
- Superior Medical/Renal

== Medical library ==
Providence St. Peter Hospital's medical library is open for the use of medical staff, residents, medical students, hospital employees, and the general public. The library is located on the Lower Level of the Medical/Surgical Tower but has been closed since the outbreak of COVID-19 in 2020.

Walking trail, 2026

Providence Way, 2026

Grounds and artwork, 2026
