= Queen of the Valley Medical Center =

Coordinates: 38.324095°N 122.295969°W

- Providence Health & Services

Geography
- Location: 1000 Trancas Street; Napa, Napa County, California, United States

Organization
- Type: General

Services
- Emergency department: Level III trauma center
- Beds: 208

History
- Founded: 1958

Links
- Website: www.providence.org/locations/norcal/queen-of-the-valley
- Lists: Hospitals in California

Queen of the Valley Medical Center is a Catholic medical center located in Napa, California operated by Providence Health & Services.

== History ==
The hospital first opened its doors in 1958 when it replaced Parks Victory Memorial Hospital. It is a Level III adult trauma center. The medical center is the largest employer in Napa County.

== Services ==
- Regional Cancer Center
- Regional Heart Center
- Trauma, Emergency
- Imaging Services
- Cancer Center
- Nursing Center of Excellence
- Rehabilitation Services
- Women's Imaging Center
- Maternity & Infant Care
- Workhealth
- Regional Orthopedic Center
