= Health Management Resources =

American weight management company

Health Management Resources (HMR)
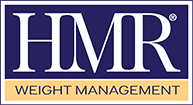
- Industry: Weight Loss, Weight Management
- Founded: 1983
- Founder: Dr. Lawrence Stifler
- Headquarters: Sioux Falls, SD, United States
- Key people: Ryan Niparts, CEO
- Number of employees: unknown
- Parent: Profile Plan
- Website: www.hmrprogram.com

Health Management Resources, also known as HMR, offers weight management programs that combine a structured diet, physical activity, and often some types of life-coaching. As of December 30, 2022 - HMR was purchased by Profile Plan.

== History ==
HMR was founded as a separate company in 1983, and has provided its programs to U.S. hospitals, medical centers, provider groups, and health systems. More recently, HMR introduced a self-directed program that participants can access online with the option of coaching support by phone.

In 2013, HMR became a subsidiary of Merck & Co., Inc. and was part of Merck's Healthcare Services & Solutions, a separate entity from the pharmaceutical business, which focuses on improving the healthcare experience for patients, providers, and payers.

In January 2020, HMR was acquired by Providence St. Joseph Health.

Moreover, HMR has been included on U.S. News & World Report's rankings for 38 Weight-Loss Diets.

== The HMR Program ==
The HMR program's mission is to help participants learn ways to reduce fat in the diet, eat more fruits and vegetables, and increase daily physical activity. The goal is to make lifestyle changes to lose weight, and then maintain the weight loss through the reinforcement of behavioral changes.

=== The HMR Diet ===
All HMR options use a diet of meal replacements (portion-controlled, packaged foods) to reduce food choice decisions.

== Weight-loss plans ==
HMR offers a range of program options with varying degrees of structure. There is a clinical plan that includes medical supervision and face-to-face group coaching. Individuals may also choose less structured options which can be done with or without medical supervision in a clinic setting. HMR also offers several “at home” weight-loss plans.

The Programs are divided into two phases:

1. Phase 1 (weight loss): The goal is to lose weight quickly by replacing current meals and snacks with HMR foods (and fruits and vegetables on some plans) while beginning to incorporate regular physical activity.
2. Phase 2 (weight management): Participants learn more strategies to manage their weight over the long term as they face "real-world" eating challenges such as socializing, dining out, or traveling.

== Program outcomes ==
=== In-clinic outcome data ===
There have been several published studies documenting the outcomes of the HMR Program. The clinic-based Decision-Free Diet has a good number of published weight losses ranging from 43 – 66 pounds in 12 – 26 weeks. Two studies have reported on weight losses of 100 pounds or more with the average weight loss over 130 pounds. The clinic-based Healthy Solutions Diet has reported weight losses ranging from 28 – 37.5 pounds in 12 – 26 weeks.

=== Healthy Solutions at Home weight loss-data ===
Two randomized controlled trials on the Healthy Solutions at Home Program found that participants in the phone-based program (receiving weekly group coaching by phone) lost as much weight as those in a traditional face-to-face clinic. In both studies, participants in the phone coaching program lost an average of 28 pounds at 6 months. Another randomized study found that participants using Healthy Solutions at Home without any additional coaching lost an average of 13 pounds in 12 weeks.
