= Economics for Equity and the Environment Network =

Economics for Equity and the Environment Network (E3) is a network of economists doing applied research on environmental issues with a social equity focus. E3 is based in Portland, Oregon.

== History and mission ==
E3 was founded in 2007 by economists Kristen Sheeran, Frank Ackerman, James Boyce, Eban Goodstein, and Astrid Scholz with the goals of (1) developing better theory and research within the economics profession and (2) involving progressive, environmental economists more actively in policy development.

== Programs and activities ==
E3 maintains a Green Economist Directory, searchable by the state of residence and area of expertise, of over 150 economists who are committed to its vision of "engaged, practical economics". To be included in the directory, economists sign a statement that they agree with the following principles: (1) a clean and safe environment is a birthright of every person; (2) safeguarding the natural environment is inseparable from promoting social justice; and (3) today’s environmental challenges demand an alternative to the anti-regulatory, anti-reform bias that dominates public policy debates.

E3 helps connect its economists with NGOs, media, and decision makers who need economic arguments for environmental protection. E3 economists publish in journals, books, and newspapers. E3 also works with graduate students in economics to get them more involved in applied research on environmental issues through workshops, internships, and dissertation fellowships.

E3’s climate task force has contributed to the debates over the economics of global warming. Climate task force economists have testified before Congress and the European Parliament and presented their research at the American Association for the Advancement of Science (AAAS), the Pew Center on Global Climate Change, the American Economic Association, the United States Society for Ecological Economics (USSEE), and other venues. They have also participated in press conferences on climate policy organized by the NRDC, the Union of Concerned Scientists, the Southern Alliance for Clean Energy, and other organizations. The task force’s more recent project, Real Climate Economics.org, launched in May 2009.

== Associated organizations ==
- Ecotrust
- Stockholm Environment Institute
- Political Economy Research Institute (PERI) at the University of Massachusetts Amherst
