= Logan Health Medical Center =

Logan Health
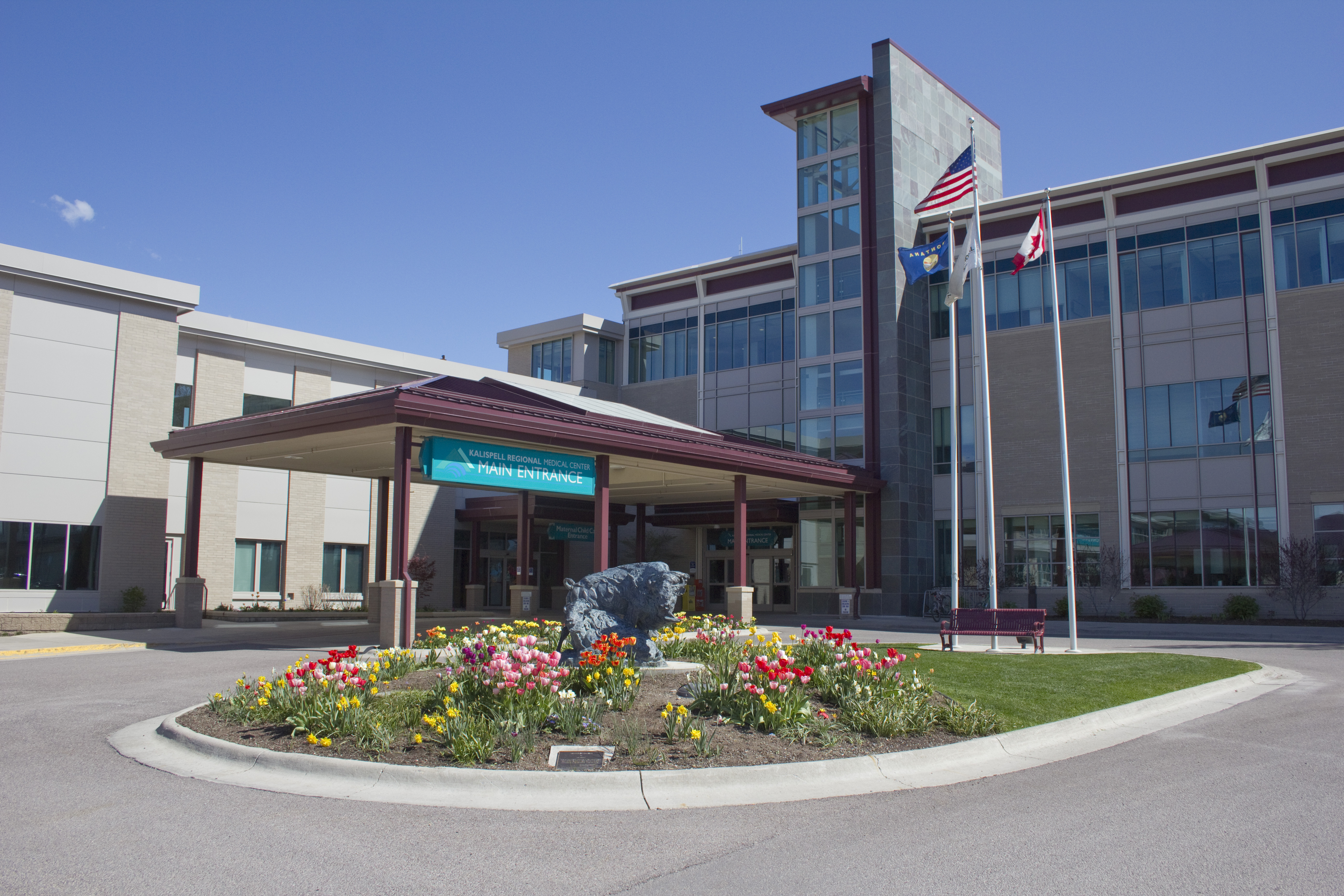

- Location within Montana

Geography
- Location: Flathead County, Montana, Kalispell, Montana, United States
- Coordinates: 48.2145°N 114.3240°W

Organization
- Type: General
- Network: One Sky Health

Services
- Emergency department: Level III trauma center
- Beds: 622

Helipads
- Helipad: Yes

History
- Founded: Kalispell, United States (1910)

Links
- Website: www.logan.org
- Lists: Hospitals in Montana

Logan Health Medical Center is a 622-bed non-profit, tertiary, research and academic medical center located in Kalispell, Montana, servicing the northern Montana region. Formerly Kalispell Regional Medical Center, the hospital is owned by One Sky Health and is one of the flagship hospitals of the system. The hospital is the region's only university-level academic medical center and is affiliated with the University of Montana. The hospital is also an ACS designated level III trauma center and has a helipad to handle medevac patients. Attached to the medical center is the Montana Children's Hospital that treats infants, children, adolescents, and young adults up to the age of 21. The hospital is also accredited by the Commission on Accreditation of Rehabilitation Facilities (CARF)

== History ==
In 1973, the ownership of the Kalispell General Hospital was transferred from the Sisters of Mercy to the community and the name was then changed to the Kalispell Regional Hospital. On January 17, 1976, the Kalispell Regional Hospital was completed and ready to render patient care. The old hospital (Kalispell General Hospital) became "Courthouse East" and was used by the county for various offices until a new courthouse building could be constructed. In 1975, A.L.E.R.T., helicopter ambulance service, flew its first patient. In 1981, a medical/surgical Intensive Care Unit was added. In 1985, Brendan House, an extended care facility, was opened. In 1987, the Kalispell Regional Hospital became the first in the state of Montana to install an MRI, a cancer treatment center was added, and a new freestanding Obstetrics Department was opened. In 1989, Dialysis and Inpatient Rehabilitation facilities were added. In 1994, Kalispell Regional Healthcare purchased nearly 50 acres adjacent to the hospital. In 1996, the Kalispell Regional Healthcare opened "The Summit Community Center for Health Promotion and Fitness", combining the services of Second Wind (fitness) and the Health Promotion Center (community health education and rehabilitation) into one 84,000 square foot building. KRH was the largest employer in Northwest Montana, employing upwards of 2900 people In 1997, Kalispell Regional Hospital changed their name to "Kalispell Regional Medical Center". In 2021, Kalispell Regional Healthcare's hospital system rebranded as "Logan Health", in reference to Logan Pass, the highest point along the Going-to-the-Sun Road in Glacier National Park.

== Kalispell Medical Equipment ==
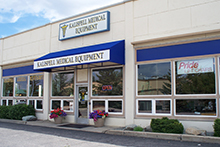
Kalispell Medical Equipment

Kalispell Medical Equipment is a durable medical equipment formed as a division of Kalispell Regional Healthcare in 1994. It provides rehab mobility products such as wheelchairs and scooters, oxygen concentrators, and ambulatory aids such as walkers. Kalispell Medical Equipment services nearly 20,000 square miles and 170,000 people around the Flathead Valley, including Flathead County, Lake County, and Lincoln County.

KME is a member of the Kalispell Chamber of Commerce. It is fully accredited as a Durable Medical Equipment Company by the Healthcare Quality Association on Accreditation. Kalispell Regional Healthcare has received an A− rating with the Better Business Bureau.

== Rankings ==
Kalispell Regional Medical Center was rated in 28 conditions and procedures by Healthgrades in 2015. Kalispell Regional Medical Center has received an A− Rating with the Better Business Bureau.

In Spring 2016 The Leapfrog Group's "Hospital Safety Score" page scored Kalispell Regional Medical Center as a B.

== See also ==
- List of hospitals in Montana
