= St. Peter's Hospital (Helena, Montana) =

Hospital in Montana, United States

Coordinates: 46.5822°N 111.9967°W

St. Peter's Hospital is a healthcare facility in Helena, Montana. The hospital was founded in 1883. The facility has a 24-bed behavioral center and a 99-bed acute care facility. It is accredited by DNV.

The facility was the subject of controversy due to Dr Thomas C Weiner's practice there. Weiner was fired in 2020.

St Peter's paid a fine of more than $10 million in response to a federal investigation over charges for procedures that were never actually performed.
