= Community Medical Center (Montana) =

- Location within Montana

Geography
- Location: Missoula, Montana, United States
- Coordinates: 46.847°N 114.048°W

Organization
- Type: Community

Services
- Beds: 146

Helipads
- Helipad: Yes

History
- Founded: 1922

Links
- Website: http://communitymed.org
- Lists: Hospitals in Montana

Community Medical Center, is an integrated health care facility based in Missoula, Montana.

== Overview ==
Community Medical Center is on a 45-acre (18 ha) campus located near the center of the Missoula valley.

== Services ==
Community Medical Center is the only facility providing obstetrical and newborn care in Missoula County, Montana, and is one of the largest such programs in the state of Montana. It also offers residential and transitional living and day treatment program for brain injury survivors, and the elderly. It is also the only hospital in western Montana that has a separate Pediatric Intensive Care Unit.

== New Women's and Newborn Center ==
As of 2011, the Community Medical Center is constructing a brand new Women's and Newborn Center, which is supposed to add 22,000 square feet (2,000 m^{2}) to the existing 15,000-square-foot (1,400 m^{2}) obstetrical and newborn care unit. The total estimated cost of this project is 17.8 million dollars.

== See also ==
- List of hospitals in Montana
