= Ray Lawrence (music producer) =

American record producer (1927–2017)

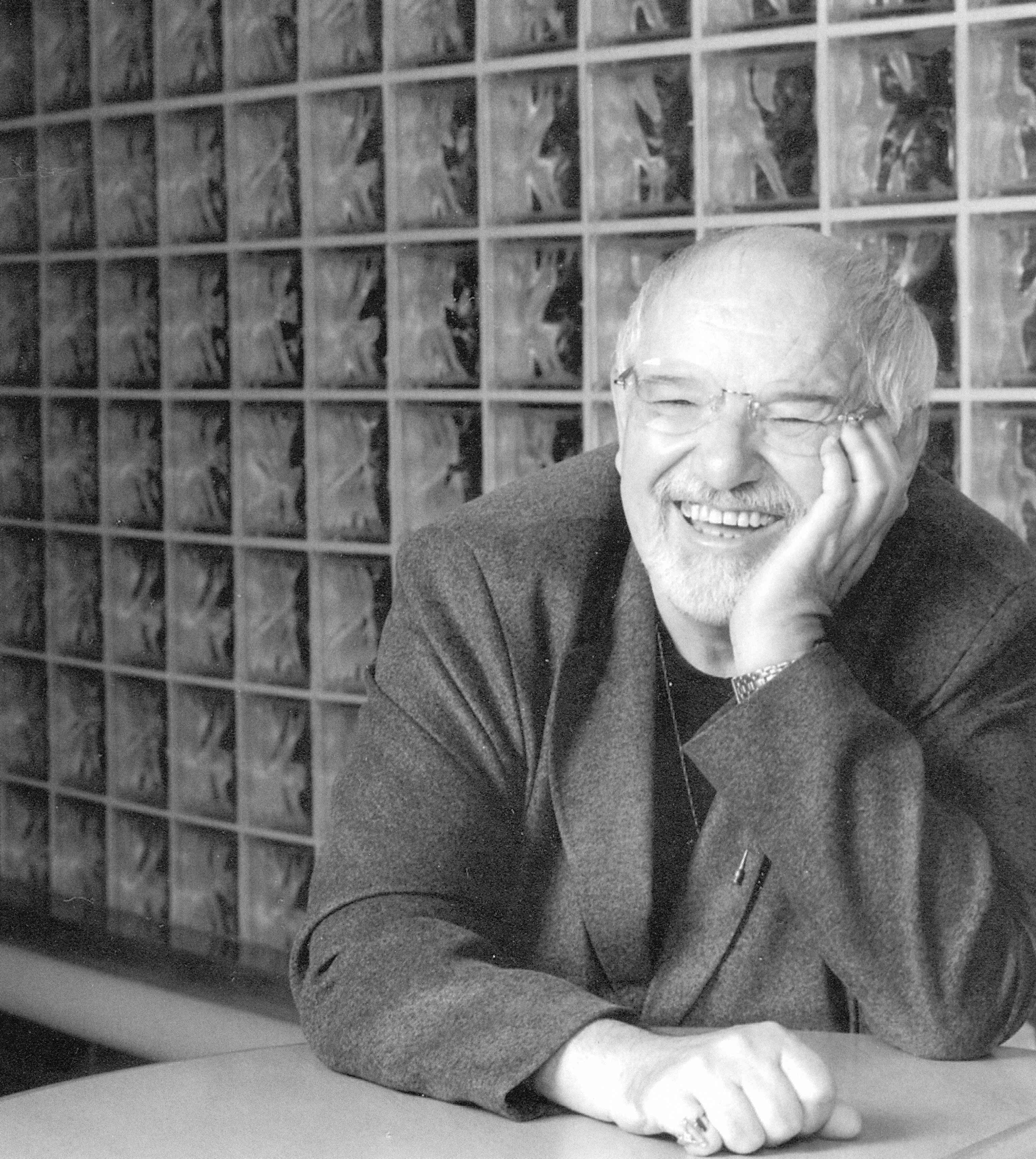
- Lawrence in the early 2000s
- Born: Ray Skrepich; August 19, 1927; Lorain, Ohio, U.S.
- Died: August 27, 2017 (aged 90); Studio City, California, U.S.
- Occupations: bandleader, record company executive, record producer, personal manager
- Years active: 1950s–2017

Ray M. Lawrence (born Ray Skreprich; August 19, 1927 – August 27, 2017) was an American bandleader, record company executive and producer and personal manager.

== Biography ==
Lawrence's father was born in Wickhaven, Pennsylvania and his mother was born in Uzhorod, Bohemia. Ray's grandfather died in the Darr Mine Disaster of 1907 in Wickhaven. After the disaster Ray's grandmother moved her children back to Uzhorod. While in Uzhorod and during World War I, Lawrence's father, although he was a United States citizen, was drafted at the age of 16 into the Austrian Army. He served as a runner in the trenches. After his service he met his wife in Uzhorod, married and moved to Lorain, Ohio, an industrial city 30 miles west of Cleveland, Ohio on the shore of Lake Erie settled by many Eastern European immigrants. Two of the largest employers in Lorain during the early to mid 1900s were the American Ship Building Company and U.S. Steel.

Lawrence was born the middle of three children in Lorain, Ohio. He was in elementary school during the Great Depression. When he was 8 or 9 years old he worked at the carnival, carrying water. During summer vacations to visit his cousin's in Lyndora, Pennsylvania, he'd play together with Andy Warhol. While in high school on weekends and during the summer Ray worked in the fields picking beans and strawberries, washing cars, delivering women's clothing and at the Lorain Works of U.S. Steel, a large steel mill on the shore of Lake Erie, as a laborer, burner and clerk. He would listen to his favorite big bands on the radio, from records and by attending live performances at the many ballrooms (including the Cedar Point Grand Ballroom, Crystal Beach Ballroom and others) that lined the Lake Erie shoreline.

Ray Lawrence at Great Lakes Naval Training Center.

On his 17th birthday, before finishing high school, and after his brother told him to do so, Lawrence enlisted in the United States Navy. This was towards the end of World War II. He wanted to be a dive bomber gunner, but because of dental problems he wasn't offered that choice. He served in the Pacific Theatre on the escort aircraft carrier USS Point Cruz (CVE-119). The USS Point Cruz hosted a Marine Corps air squadron. He was on the crew that commissioned the ship and was a plank owner. He served as a 20 mm anti-aircraft gun gunner, 40 mm anti-aircraft gun trainer and storekeeper. Because of his background he was simply known as "Russian" on the ship. During his service the ship had missions to Guam, the Marshall Islands, Okinawa, Iwo Jima, Tokyo and other locations. The ship transported some survivors from the dive bomber attack on the USS Franklin (CV-13), was at Buckner Bay in Okinawa during Typhoon Louise in 1945 and at Bikini Atoll during preparations for the atomic bomb testing of Operation Crossroads in 1946. While in the Navy Ray was paid $21 per month. After serving in the Navy 2 1/2 years he returned to Lorain and finished high school. Lawrence was originally a member of his high school class of 1945, but because of his enlistment, graduated as a member of his high school class of 1947. On his return to Lorain, he did not become a member of the 5220 "club" (52 weeks of work for $20 per week) but instead he worked checking train cars for the terminal railroad at U.S. Steel. He then went to Ohio University in Athens, Ohio.

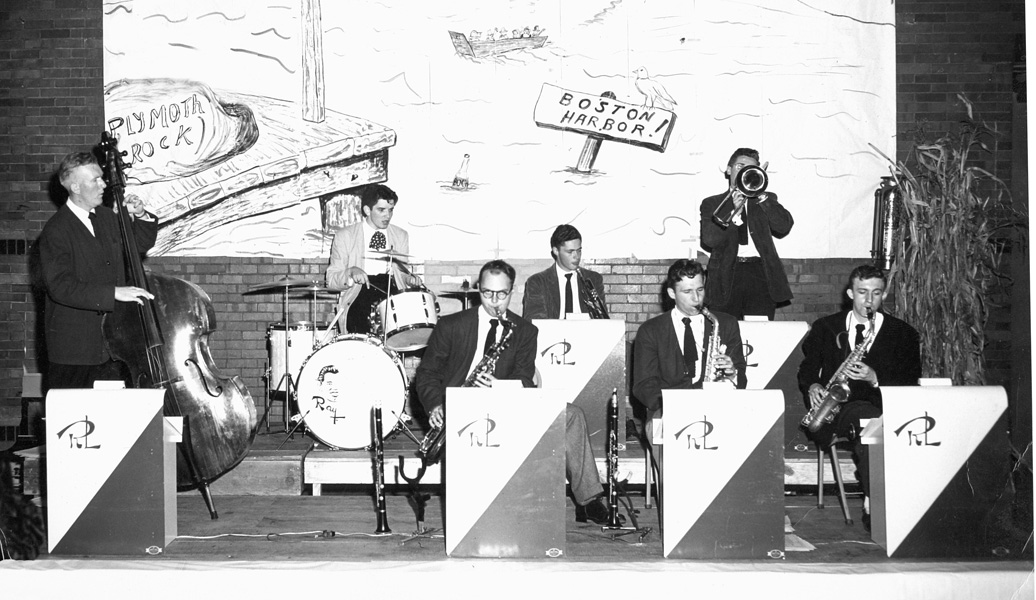
Ray Lawrence and his Orchestra.

In 1948 while at Ohio University he started his own big band consisting of 3 saxophones, 1 trumpet, 1 trombone and 3 rhythm players. He was a drummer. He was born Ray Skrepich, but when it came time to name his band he thought his name was too hard to remember and pronounce, so his father suggested he use his mother's maiden name of Lawrence. As a result, the band was named "Ray Lawrence and his Orchestra". After a couple of years his big band disbanded and he formed a rhythm and blues quartet named "Rockin Ray and his Rocket Rhythm". His quartet played race music on the Chitlin' Circuit and shared the bill with groups such as Bo Diddley, Fats Domino and Otis Williams and the Charms.

In the spring of 1953 Lawrence stopped performing and was a salesman for American Tobacco Company, Johnson Wax and then a reporter for F. W. Dodge Corporation. He then started his own theatrical booking agency in Cleveland, Ohio named Artistry and Promotion. He booked musical combos and some variety acts across the United States and Canada. He was married in February 1954, and subsequently he and his wife Grace had three children, Jeff, Connie and Lisa. He also has four grandchildren, Christopher, Kathy, Matthew and Jenna.

Ray Lawrence Opening Cosnat West Coast office.

In the fall of 1960 Lawrence joined Cosnat Distributing, a record distributor, in Cleveland, Ohio as a salesman. Jerry Blaine founded Cosnat and it was a “leader in its field on the Eastern Seaboard “. In the fall of 1961 he moved to Los Angeles, California and was instrumental in setting up Cosnat's West Coast operations as a salesman and then branch manager.

In the fall of 1962 Lawrence became the general sales manager for Colpix Records and Dimension Records, which were divisions of Columbia Pictures, in New York, New York. After a year, he was promoted to General Manager of Colpix Records and worked directly for Don Kirshner after Kirshner sold Aldon Music to Columbia Pictures in 1963 and became head of Columbia's newly expanded record division. While at Colpix Records Ray signed and produced Woody Allen’s first comedy album and also signed John Davidson and Davy Jones before he became a member of “The Monkees”.

Ray Lawrence "The Record Man".

In April 1965 Lawrence started his own business, Ray Lawrence, Ltd. to specialize in promoting phonograph records and servicing rack jobbers, one stops and retail record outlets. His first client was Madman Muntz and some of his other clients included Johnny Mathis, Robert Goulet, Bill Cosby, [Farley Parkenfarker], [Okie Duke], Woody Allen, Barbra Streisand, Chet Atkins, Jerry Reed, Floyd Cramer, Three Dog Night, Steppenwolf, Ray Price, the North Texas State One O'Clock Lab Band under Leon Breeden, World's Greatest Jazz Band and others. He was known in the record business for his moniker, "The Record Man".

In the late 1970s he started Dobre Records, a jazz record label. He produced and released over 50 albums of jazz musicians including Milcho Leviev, Cannonball Adderley, Ruth Brown and others. A detailed discography is available below. Most of the records were recorded at Gold Star Studios in Hollywood, California. Five of the albums he produced were nominated for Grammy Awards. Lawrence was also involved in starting at least two other record labels, including Black Jazz Records and Jazzz Records.

In 1979 Lawrence attended the 11th Annual Cultural Awards dinner at the White House hosted by President Jimmy Carter.

In May 1980, because of changes in the record industry business model Lawrence stopped promoting phonograph records and started acting as a personal manager for musical artists, variety acts and others. Some of his clients included Trini Lopez, Al Martino and Buzz Aldrin.

Lawrence died in Studio City, California on August 27, 2017, at the age of 90.

== Discography ==
Some albums that Ray has produced.

Dobre Number	Artist	Title	Year released
1000	Laurindo Almeida	Latin Guitar	1976
1001	Chuck Flores Quintet	Flores Azules	1976
1003	Elliott Fisher	Land of Make Believe	1976
1004	Bobby Hackett Quartet	Thanks Bobby	1976
1005	The Vigs	Somebody Loves Me	1976
1006	Stanley Behrens Trio	Jazz Harmonica De Luxe	1976
1007	Mundell Lowe Trio	Guitar Player	1977
1008	Cannonball Adderley Quintet	Volume 1: Montreal 1975	1977
1009	Della Griffin with Trio	Sings	1977
1010	H. Ray Crawford Quartet	It's About Time	1977
1011	Harry Bluestone Duo	Artistry in Jazz	1977
1012	Bobby Forrester Trio	Organist	1977
1013	Floyd Huddleston and His Family Singers	Happy Birthday Jesus	1977
1014	Anita O’Day with Trio	Anita O’Day	1977
1015	Tommy Vig Quintet	Tommy Vig 1978	1978
1016	Sonny Til and The Orioles	Sonny Til and The Orioles Today	1978
1017	Johnny Guarnieri Trio	Makin’ Whopee	1978
1018	Mundell Lowe Trio	The Incomparable Mundell Lowe	1978
1019	Ray Cooper & Group	Everybody's Cup of Tea	1977
1020	Les Demerle	Transfusion	1978
1021	H. Ray Crawford Quartet	Piano Lesson	1978
1022	John Tirabasso Quintet	Diamond Cufflinks and Mink	1978
1023	Pete Candoli Quartet	From the Top	1978
1024	Laurindo Almeida Trio	Laurindo Almeida Trio	1978
1025	Milcho Leviev Quartet	Piano Lesson	1978
1026	Sonny Til with Band	Back to the Chapel	1978
1027	Roger Kellaway	Solo Piano	1978
1028	Billy Perkins	Sings for Jesus	1978
1029	Anita O’Day with Trio	There's Only One	1978
1030	Jay Orlando Quartet	In a Mello-Tone	1978
1031	Mel Henke Trio	Love Touch	1977
1032	Farley Parkenfarker	Plays Elvis	1978
1033	Nat McCoy with Group	Soul	1978
1034	Bill Farrell with Trio	Lush Life	1978
1035	Dave & Larry Koonse Quartet	Father & Son Jazz Guitar	1978
1036	Smokey Stover and the Magnificent 7	Anyone for Country Hoe-Down	1978
1037	Joe Conley & Eric Scott	Of the Waltons	1978
1038	Page Cavanaugh Trio	Is Alive	1978
1039	Milcho Leviev Quartet	Blue Levis	1978
1040	Jay Orlando Quartet	Jay Orlando Loves Earl Bostic	1978
1041	Ruth Brown with Trio	You Don't Know Me	1978
1042	Lou Levy Trio	A Touch of Class	1978
1043	Frankie Ortega Trio	Smokin’	1978
1044	Edie Miller Quartet	Legend	
1045	Roger Kellaway	Say That Again	1978
1046	Page Cavanaugh Trio	Next Page	1978
1047	Herb Jeffries with Trio	I Remember the Bing	1978
1048	Dave & Larry Koonse Quartet	Son of Jazz Guitar	1978
1049	Linda Guymon with Quartet	Steve Allen Presents Linda Guymon	1978
1050	Pete & Conte Candoli Sextet	The Candoli Brothers	1978
1051	Abe Most Quartet	The Most-Abe, That Is	1978
1052	Laurie Loman with Orchestra	Country Weepers	1978
1053	Laurindo Almeida and Herb Jeffries	Play and Sing the Duke	1978
1054	Gene Townsel	Time Wounds All Heels	1978
1055	Mike Warren	Survival Kit	1978
1056	Eddie Joe Downs	Hard Times	1978
1057	Monty Budwig	Dig	1978
1058	George Russell with Orchestra	George Russell in London	
1059	Herb Jeffries with Trio	The King and Me	1978
1060	Don Randi & Quest	Bermuda Triangle	1978
1061	George Smith	Harmonica Blues King	1978
1062	Dick Whittinghill	The Romance of Helen Trump	1978
1063	Jay Orlando	Horn Aplenty	1978
1064	Bill Farrell	Maybe this Time	1978
1065	Bill Farrell	Sings Favorite Concertos	
1066	Joe Venuti and Tony Romano	Never Before...Never Again	1978
