= Whitefish =

Whitefish or white fish may refer to:

== Fish ==
- Whitefish (fisheries term), referring to species commercially caught in the North Atlantic
- Freshwater whitefish, members of the subfamily Coregoninae in the family Salmonidae, including:
  - Atlantic whitefish, Coregonus huntsmani in the genus Coregonus
  - Common whitefish, Coregonus lavaretus in the genus Coregonus
  - Lake whitefish, Coregonus clupeaformis in the genus Coregonus
  - Mountain whitefish, Prosopium williamsoni, in the genus Prosopium
- Cape whitefish, Pseudobarbus capensis, a cyprinid
- Beluga sturgeon, Huso huso
- Caspian kutum, also called "White Fish" or "Caspian White Fish"
- The chimaerae species:
  - Australian ghost shark
  - Ogilby's ghostshark
- Some tilefishes, including
  - Ocean whitefish (Caulolatilus princeps)
- White steenbras, (Lithognathus lithognathus), a sparid

== Places ==
- Whitefish Bay, a bay in Lake Superior between the United States and Canada
- Whitefish Range, Montana and British Columbia

=== Canada ===
- Whitefish, Ontario
- Whitefish Falls, Ontario
- Whitefish Lake First Nation, Ontario

=== United States ===
- Whitefish, Montana
  - Whitefish Mountain Resort, a ski resort on Big Mountain in Whitefish, Montana
- Whitefish Bay, Wisconsin
- Whitefish Township, Michigan

== Other uses ==
- Whitefish salad, a food made from fish
- "Whitefish", an instrumental by the rock band Yes, first released on the 1985 live album 9012Live: The Solos

== See also ==
- Whitefish Bay (disambiguation)
- Whitefish Lake (disambiguation)
- Whiting
- Whitefish Energy
