= Michael Goguen =

American engineer and businessman (born 1964)

- Born: March 8, 1964 (age 62)
- Education: Cornell University, Stanford University
- Occupations: philanthropist, venture capitalist, engineer and businessman
- Spouse: Jamie Goguen

Michael Lewis Goguen (born March 8, 1964) is an American engineer and businessman. He is a former partner at the venture capital firm Sequoia Capital, and as of 2015 was ranked at number 52 on Forbes magazine's annual Midas List of the best dealmakers in technology and life science venture capital.

== Career ==
Goguen graduated with a Bachelor of Arts / Science from Cornell University, then proceeded to gain his Masters of Science from Stanford University.

Goguen was employed by Sequoia from 1996 to 2016, during which time was a board member of startups including OpenDNS, Quantenna Communications, Versa Networks, vIPtela, and Infoblox. He led Sequoia's investments in Ardent (CSCO), Avanex (AVNX), LitePoint (TER), LogLogic (TIBX), MaxComm (CSCO), Monterey Networks (CSCO), Navini (CSCO), Netiverse (CSCO), NetScreen (JNPR), Pipelinks (CSCO), Redback Networks (RBAK), Spatial Wireless (ALU), Springbank (CacheFlow), Versatile (VTSS), Virident (WDC), VitalSigns (ALU), and Yago Systems (Cabletron), among others. He was fired from Sequoia immediately after being sued by his longtime mistress Amber Baptiste for sexual abuse and breach of contract. The lawsuit was dismissed in March 2019 for "Baptiste’s failure to provide documents, undergo medical exams and appear at hearings".

In 2019, Goguen founded Two Bear Capital, a venture capital firm based in Whitefish, Montana. Two Bear Capital invested $22 million to Inimmune, a biotech company, in July 2020; this investment was part of the largest Series A investment in Montana history.

== Personal life ==
Goguen has been married four times; his wife is Jamie Stephenson Goguen.

Goguen's primary residence is a 75,000 sq ft mansion that overlooks Whitefish Lake.

== Philanthropy ==
Goguen funds a nonprofit air rescue service, Two Bear Air Rescue, based at Glacier Park International Airport. The nonprofit also helps wildlife researchers track grizzly bear movements.

In 2017, Goguen founded Two Bear Therapeutic Riding Center, a nonprofit organization providing equine-assisted development programs for those with special needs.

== Matthew Marshall fraud and allegations ==
A civil lawsuit filed by four former employees led by Matthew Anthony Marshall in February 2021 accused Goguen of racketeering and made wild accusations about Goguen's relationships with women. The case was declared to lack merit by Judge Donald Molloy and dismissed with prejudice in May 2022. Marshall is currently serving jail time in federal prison for money laundering, income tax evasion, and defrauding Goguen in their joint venture.

In November 2022, New York published a piece by investigative journalist Ken Silverstein that was researched over 18 months. Silverstein examined Marshall's con and his claims against Goguen. Silverstein discovered that while Goguen gave cash gifts worth millions of dollars to over 30 women and frequently sent Marshall text messages about having casual sex with women he met in strip clubs, interviews with witnesses and alleged victims undermined Marshall’s outlandish claims. Silverstein then went on to write about Marshall's campaign to weaponize the media against Goguen. “One of the strategies Marshall seemed to have in mind was to recruit a credulous journalist -- that would later be me [Silverstein], apparently -- who would faithfully repeat the claims from the civil lawsuit against Goguen."
