= Bruck (vehicle) =

Bus built to combine goods and passenger transport

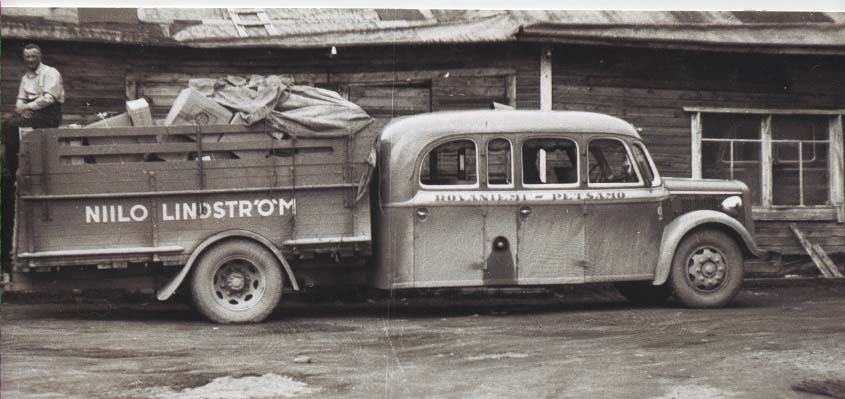
A bus in Finland in the early 20th century with the cargo area totally separated from the bus body

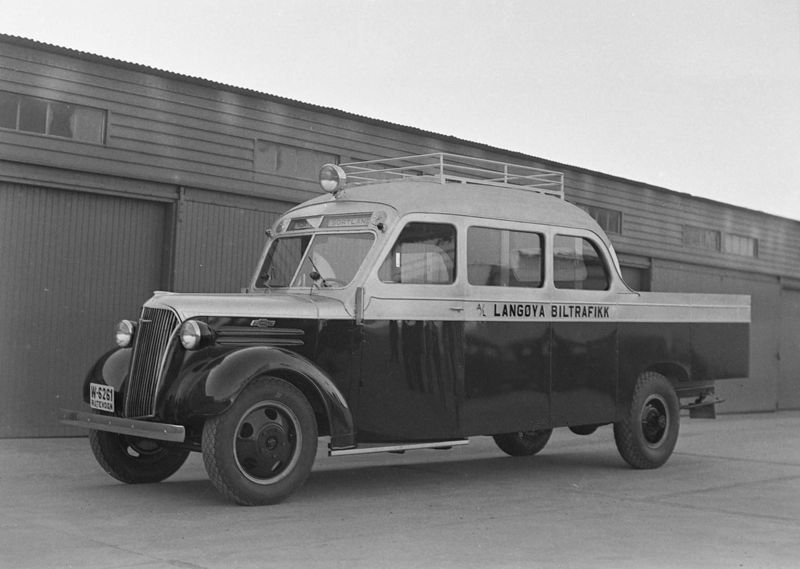
1937 Chevrolet bodied by Anco in Trondheim with an open cargo area integrated with the body

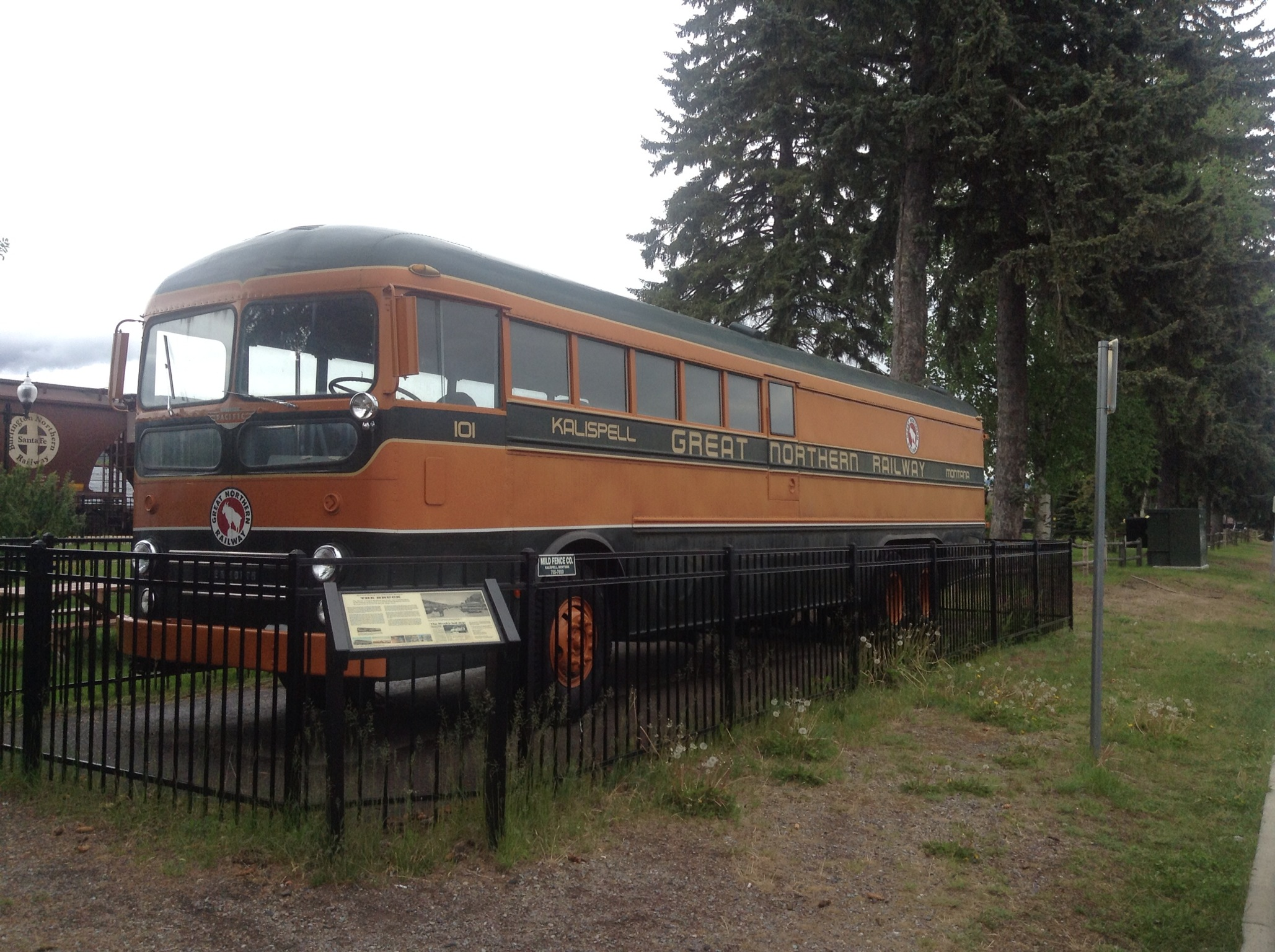
A preserved 1951 Kenworth bruck displayed at the Whitefish Depot

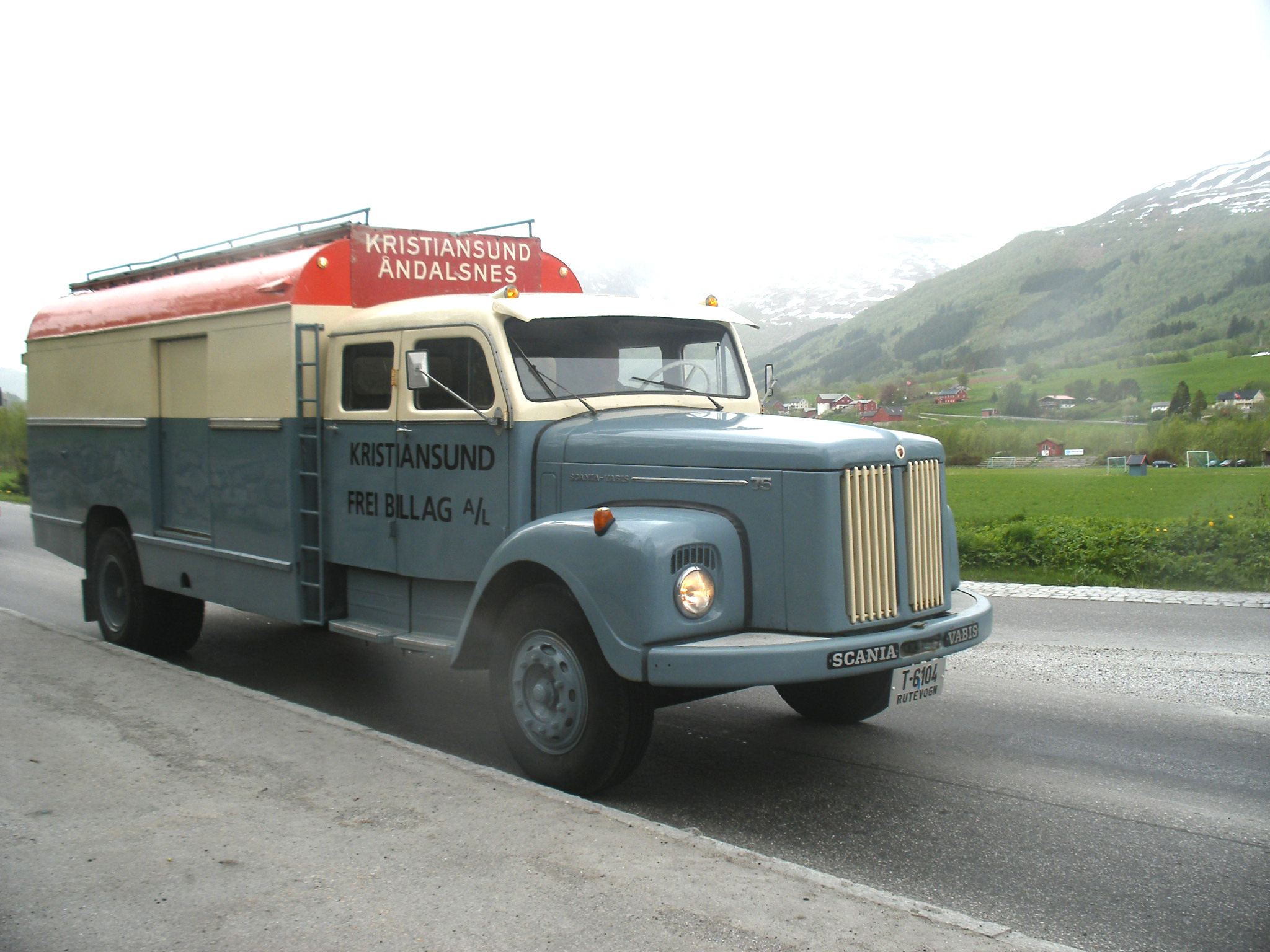
1960 Scania-Vabis L75 bodied by Kristiansund Lettmetall, carrying six passengers

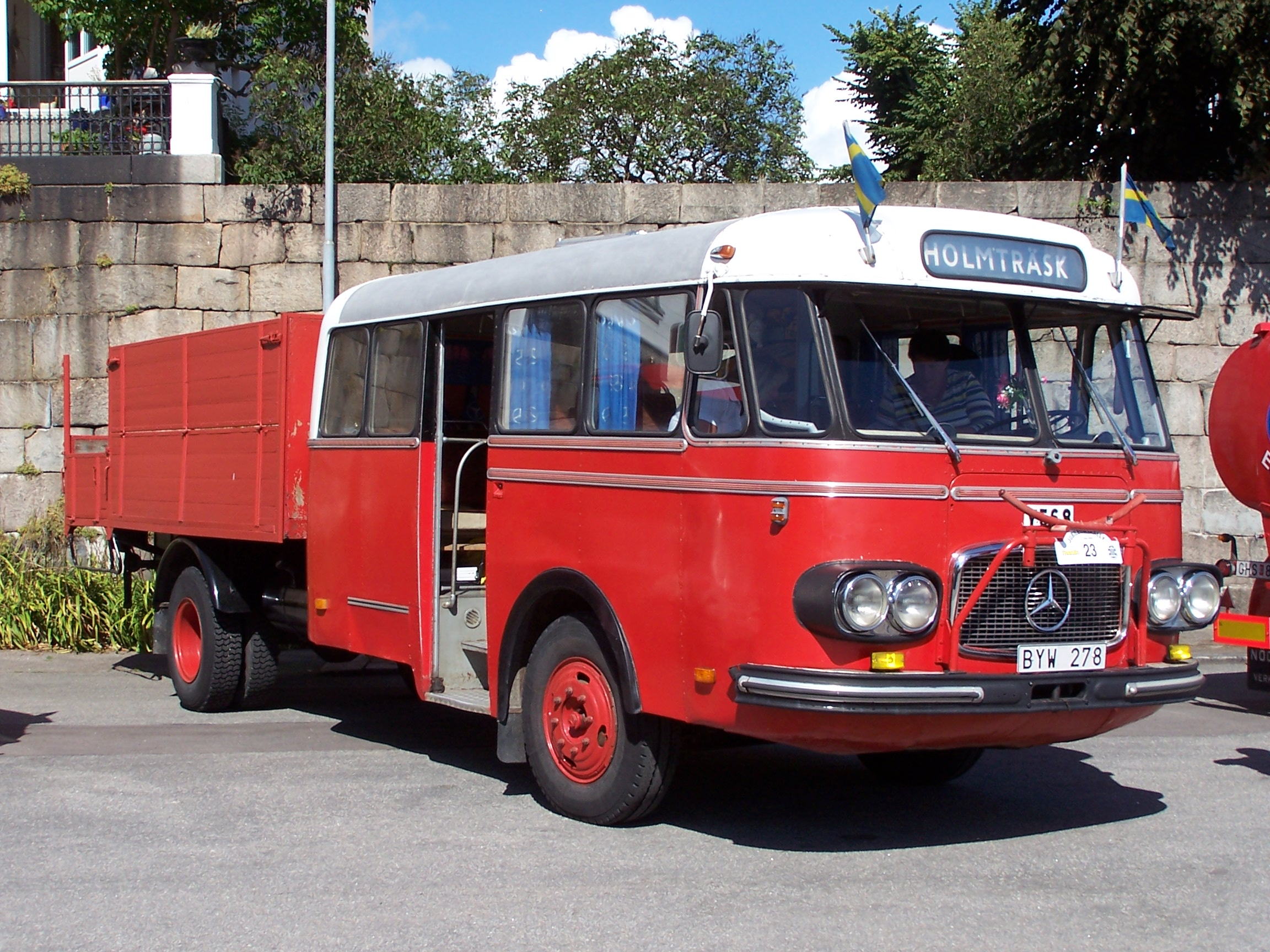
1965 Mercedes-Benz LPO322 from Sweden, a typical "skvader"

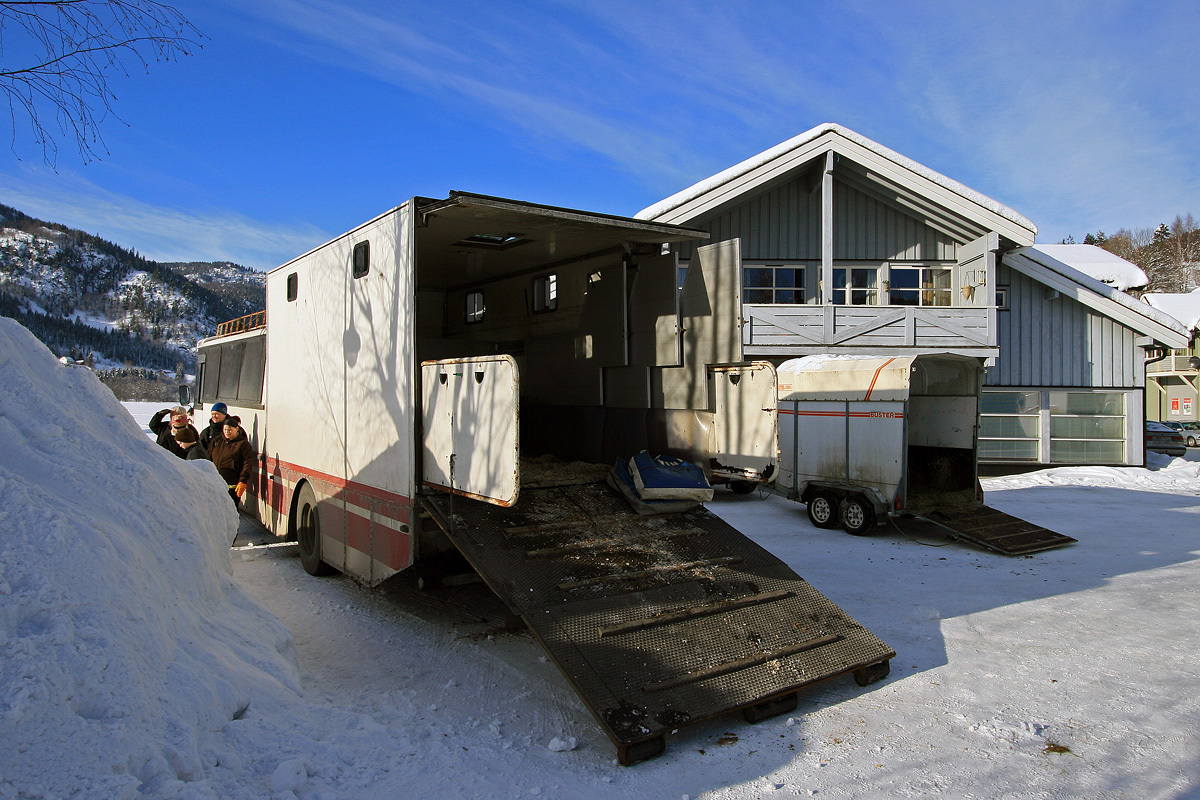
1983 Repstad-bodied Volvo B10M, converted for transport of racing horses

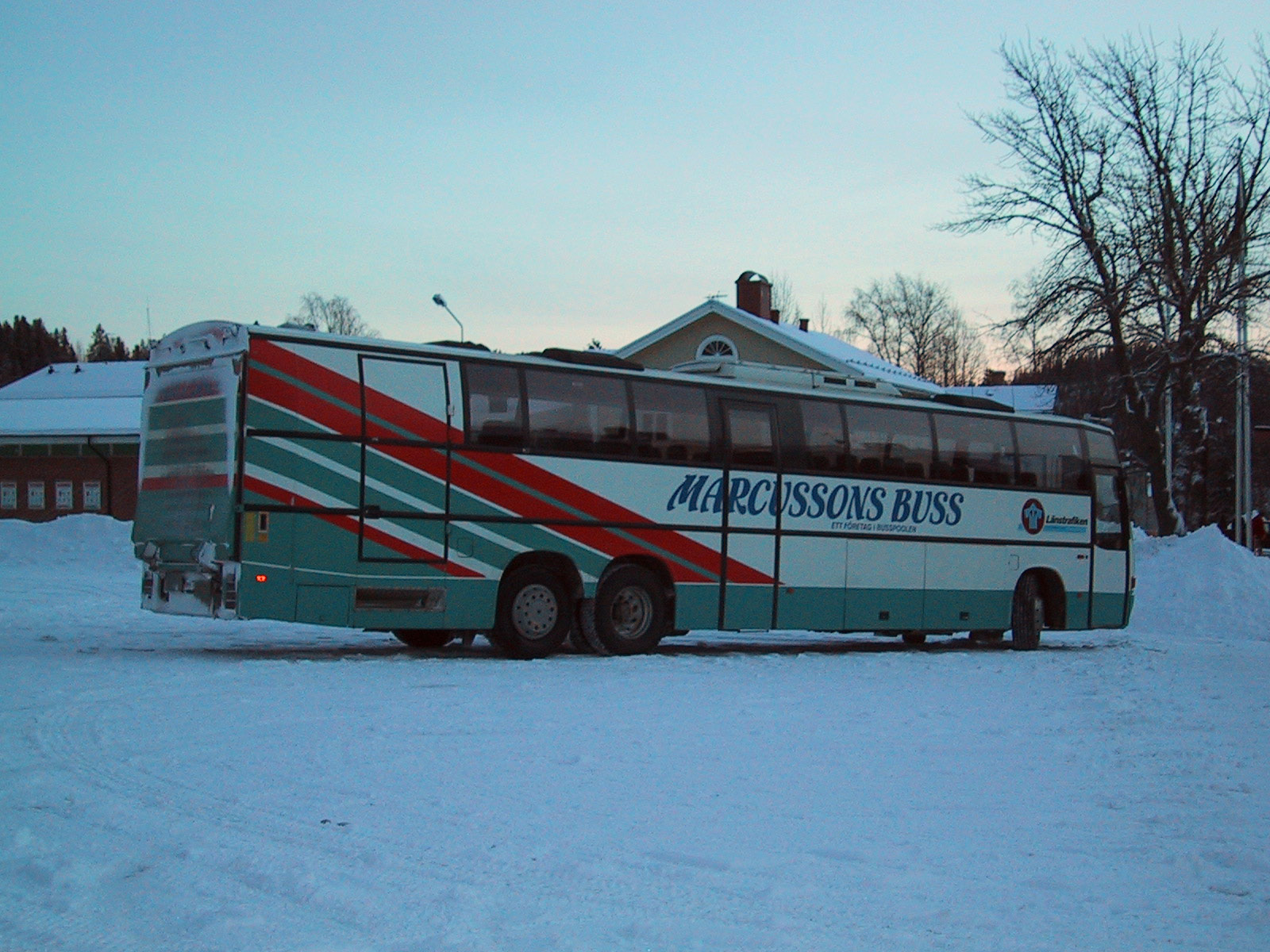
14.5-metre 1991 Delta Star 501 on Volvo B10M with cantilever tail lift

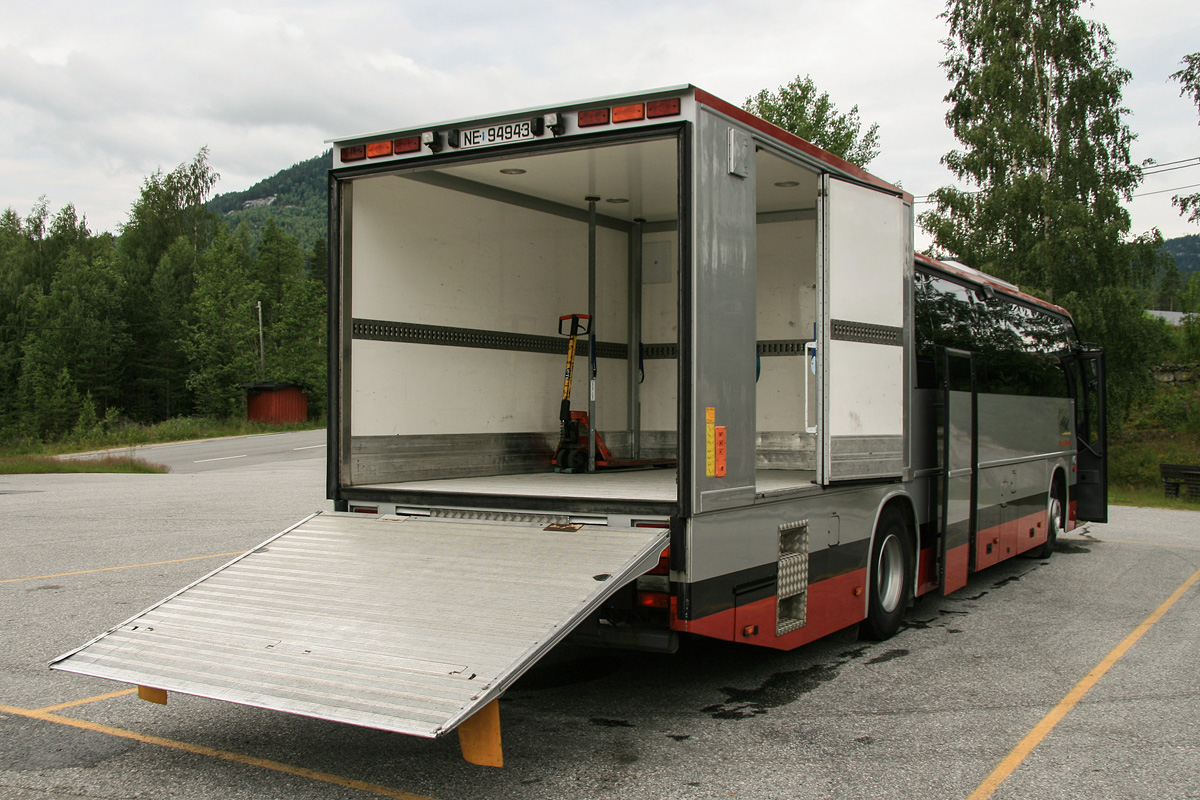
2003 Volvo 9700S on B12M from Telemark Bilruter, with all doors open. Manual pallet jack is standard equipment for single-person operation.

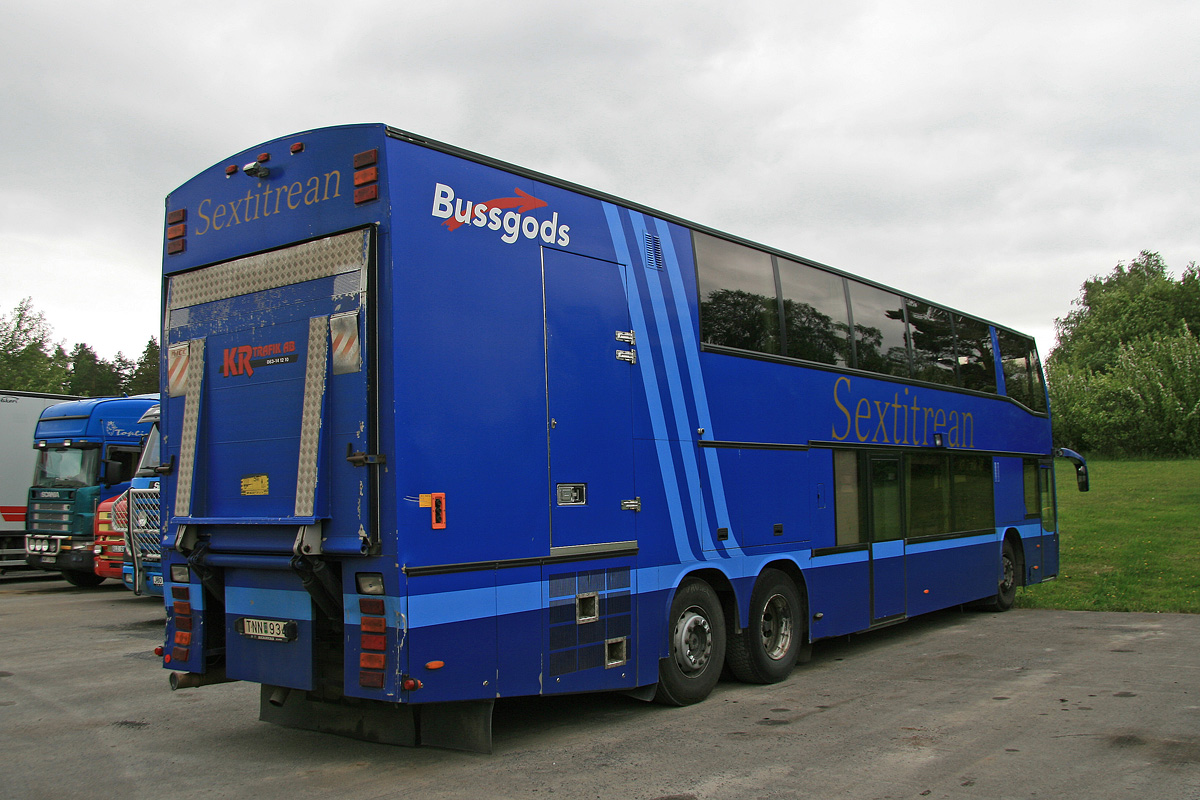
2003 Helmark-bodied Scania K124EB double-decker bruck in Östersund

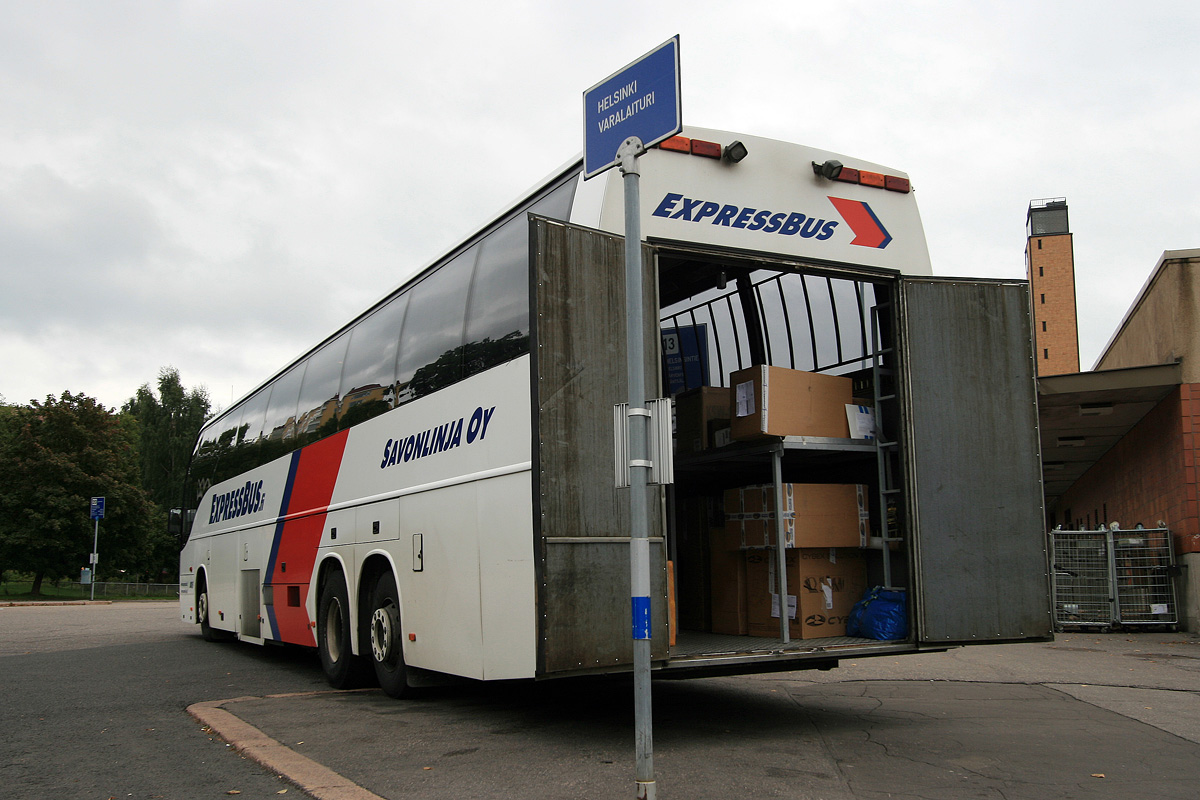
2006 Volvo 9700HD with walk-in cargo compartment from Savonlinja in Lahti

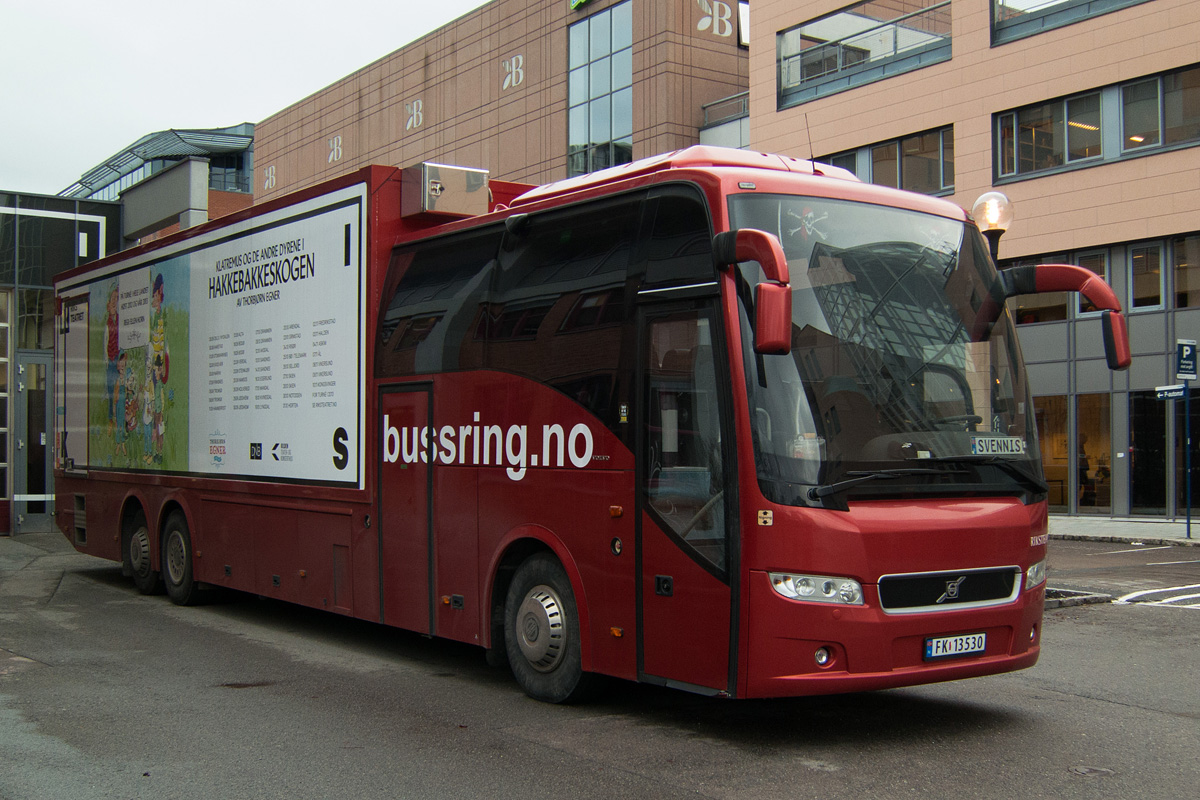
2009 Volvo 9700HD NG bruck coach from Bussring. In service for Riksteatret, outside their headquarters in Nydalen, Oslo.

A bruck (blended from the words bus and truck) is a type of bus or coach built to combine goods and passenger transport where it is most profitable or most convenient compared to separate vehicles. The word bruck was used in North America. In Australia they were known as passenger-freighters. In Europe they are known as Kombinationsbus (German), seka-auto (Finnish), kombibuss (Norwegian) and godsbuss (Swedish), with even the nickname skvader. They have for practical reasons mostly been built on front- or mid-engined chassis. In North America and Australia this type of bus was introduced in the late 1940s as a replacement for unprofitable railway lines, while in Europe they have been around since the first buses.

== Concept ==
A bus of this type is different from an ordinary bus, in that it has a separate cargo compartment that can be either closed or open air, and is by specification built for carrying goods in route traffic.

When the first automobiles were put into route traffic in rural areas, in many places they often took both passengers and cargo, including the mail. Many routes differentiated into separate routes using separate vehicles for every purpose, but some remained multi-purpose routes. Very few are still operating this way. As buses started to be built on truck chassis and later on purpose-built bus chassis, this type of route needed a vehicle with the characteristics of a bruck. The first ones had open air cargo compartments for easy loading and unloading. Later models would feature a canvas roof, wooden cargo boxes, or have the cargo compartment integrated into the bus body. As demands for cargo and passenger transport varied, some buses had only a small cargo compartment, while others were more or less built as a crew-cab truck offering only a few passenger seats. From the early 1980s, cantilever tail lifts have become standard equipment on brucks, making loading and unloading a one-man operation. From the 1990s the cargo compartments have gradually become more boxy and taller than the rest of the bus for maximum capacity.

In general, most brucks have been front- or mid-engined to make best possible use of the cargo space in the rear end, and to make loading height as low as possible, in addition to a better weight distribution. In the Nordic countries front-engined chassis from Volvo and Scania were the most common, while many were built on Mercedes-Benz and DAF chassis too. When the front-engined chassis models disappeared from the European market in the early 1980s, mid-engined chassis from Volvo and DAF became the usual choice. A few were also built on rear-engined chassis from Scania, including some 4.2-metre (14 ft) tall doubledeckers in Sweden being bodied by Helmark Carosseri and Van Hool. DAF stopped making mid-engined chassis in mid-1990s, so from then on brucks were almost exclusively built on Volvo chassis. With bus manufacturers taking over manufacturing of both chassis and body, the Volvo 9700 became the most common bruck model in the 2000s. Since Volvo also stopped making mid-engined chassis in late 2009, the production of brucks has dropped. Only around 40 rear-engined brucks have been delivered to Sweden since then. As of March 2015, the last known brucks were delivered to Swedish operator Bergvalls Busstrafik in June 2014.

=== Reuse ===
Brucks are often quite popular on the second hand market, as their unique construction is handy for many different uses. In unconverted form, they can be used by charitable organizations, as band buses, for touring theatre troops, or any group of people needing space for heavy and voluminous luggage. In converted form they are popular for motorsports, where one can use it as a mobile garage. They are also popular to convert to mobile homes, with enough luggage space for most people. They can also be converted to transport horses.

== History ==
=== North America ===
==== Canada ====
The first brucks in North America were introduced in Canada by Western Flyer Coach in 1943. This is also where the word bruck comes from. The company built both new brucks, and some were rebuilt from other buses, for Canadian Coachways, who operated a number of these in the far north. They had a storage compartment accessible from the outside by a rear door, replacing the last rows of seats.

==== United States ====
In the United States, the brucks were introduced in 1951, when Kenworth built a tri-axle one for Northern Pacific Railroad, which had a front part for 17 passengers and a taller, 18 ft long cargo compartment and a 136 hp Hall-Scott engine. Brucks were also available from Crown Coach, both as a 40 ft tri-axle carrying 20 passengers and with a 20 ft cargo compartment, or as a shorter 35 ft two-axle with 12 seats.

Kenworth also delivered a batch of twelve tri-axle brucks to Great Northern Railway in Montana, where the front half was based on the Kenworth Model T-126 SchoolCoach body, while the second half was custom built. They were fitted with a Hall-Scott under-floor "pancake" engine. One of these, that had been doing the local route from Kalispell to Whitefish and Columbia Falls between 1951 and 1971, have been preserved and is exhibited at the Whitefish Depot.

=== Australia ===
In Australia they were known as passenger-freighters, and were introduced by Western Australian Government Railways in 1949, as a substitute to railway lines that had been closed. The first ones were built on Foden PVSC6 chassis with Gardner six-cylinder diesel engines. They were green and cream in livery. Later they were built on rear-engined Hino RC320P chassis.

=== Germany ===
In 1907, Karl Kässbohrer Fahrzeugwerke in Ulm built the first "Kombinationsbus". It had a wooden bodywork built on a Saurer truck chassis. Unlike other types of brucks, it had sideways-mounted folding seats so that the same space could be used for either cargo or passengers, and probably a combination too. Kässbohrer received a patent for this in 1910. It could accommodate 18 seated and ten standing passengers. It was used by a guest house for carrying beer kegs and also passengers.

Since 2011, a cargo service by bus is offered in the Uckermark district, named kombiBUS. The service is however operated with conventional buses with underfloor luggage compartments and with trailers, so they have technically little in common with actual brucks.

=== Nordic countries ===
In Finland, Norway and Sweden, brucks were quite common in the rural parts at the beginning of the 20th century. They were a good option not only where building a railway was not economically feasible, but also where the railwaybuilders had yet to arrive or where the landscape didn't allow for any railway line. For many years the transport of milk churns between farms and dairies was one of the major uses, but as milk tank trucks became common, this was no longer needed. The manual loading and unloading of milk churns was one of the main reasons for an open air compartment, and when this was not a factor anymore, brucks started to become more like the modern versions.

==== Finland ====
Today only one Finnish bus operator, the Rovaniemi-based Gold Line (subsidiary of Koiviston Auto), use modern type brucks with tail lift in route traffic. However some other operators also use buses and coaches where the rearmost metre or two is a walk-in cargo compartment with shelves. This compartment can be entered by a large door either on the door side or from the rear side.

Finnish logistics corporation Matkahuolto operates parcel transportation in cooperation with Finnish bus corporations whose buses have an aforementioned cargo compartment.

==== Norway ====
In Norway, brucks are known as "kombibuss", or alternatively "kombinertbuss". With the exception of highly populated areas around Oslo, including areas where railway lines had been built in the late 19th century, brucks could be found in most of the country up to the 1980s, when standardised buses started to become more common, and the costly brucks were considered ineffective.

Norway's national touring theatre, Riksteatret, has for many years used brucks when touring the country, and for a long time it was Førde-based operator Firda Billag who operated the buses. However, from 1 January 2009 they have been operated by Nordreisa/Tromsø-based coach operator Bussring. Bussring bought one brucks second hand and ordered four new bruck coaches for the assignment. Contrary to all other brucks, these four that they ordered were never intended for use in route traffic, yet they are built to the same specifications. In 2014 they also bought one second hand from Firda Billag.

Firda Billag used to be one of the major bruck operators in Norway with over a dozen brucks in service, but in 2010/2011 they decided to sell the brucks and instead buy mini- and midibuses for the passenger traffic and trucks for the cargo. The passenger and cargo operations were also split into separate subsidiaries.

As of May 2015, brucks can mostly be found in the far north and along the west coast. In addition, two operators in Telemark operate brucks; Drangedal Bilruter operate one bruck between Tørdal and Drangedal Station, while Telemark Bilruter operate three bruck lines with a total of five bruck. The three lines are Åmot-Haukeli, Fyresdal-Vrådal-Seljord and Vrådal-Arendal.

==== Sweden ====
In the 1950s and 1960s, the brucks in Sweden received the nickname skvader, because of their unlikely appearance as two widely different things put together as one, just as the origin of the word "skvader". In more recent years the brucks in Sweden are known exclusively by the word "godsbuss".

The largest population of brucks in the world has most likely always been and still is in Sweden, where they are still used on many long-distance routes in the northern parts of the country. Sweden has also seen some special bruck construction. The largest are the nearly 15 metres long and 4.2 metres tall double-decker brucks that have been bodied by Helmark Carosseri and Van Hool. Earlier Van Hool have also bodied some quad-axle articulated brucks, where the passenger compartment and the cargo compartment were separated by the articulation joint. Some of these were later exported to Russia.

Sending of packets and goods with brucks in Sweden is organised through the brand Bussgods, where both private customers and business customers can send different types of letters and packets or larger types of cargo by bus throughout the entire country. This includes both routes run with brucks and routes run with conventional buses and coaches or with trucks. The Bussgods logo is visible on the majority of Swedish brucks in operation today.
