= Whitefish Lake =

Whitefish Lake may refer to:

== Settlements ==
- Whitefish Lake 6, Ontario, a reserve in Ontario, Canada inhabited by the Ojibwa Whitefish Lake First Nation.

== Lakes ==
=== Canada ===
- Whitefish Lake (British Columbia), a lake in northern British Columbia
- Whitefish Lake (Merrill Creek), a lake in the Moira River and Lake Ontario drainage basins, in Ontario
- Whitefish Lake (Cataraqui River), a lake on the Cataraqui River, Ontario
- Whitefish Lake (Thunder Bay District), a lake in Thunder Bay District in northwestern Ontario
- Whitefish Lake (Manitoba), a lake in Manitoba

=== United States ===
- Whitefish Lake (Minnesota), a lake in Crow Wing County, Minnesota
- Whitefish Lake (Montana), a lake in Flathead County, Montana
- Whitefish Lake or maar, part of the Espenberg volcanic field in Alaska

== See also ==
- Whitefish (disambiguation)
- Lake whitefish
