= Whitefish Lake State Park =

Park in Montana, USA

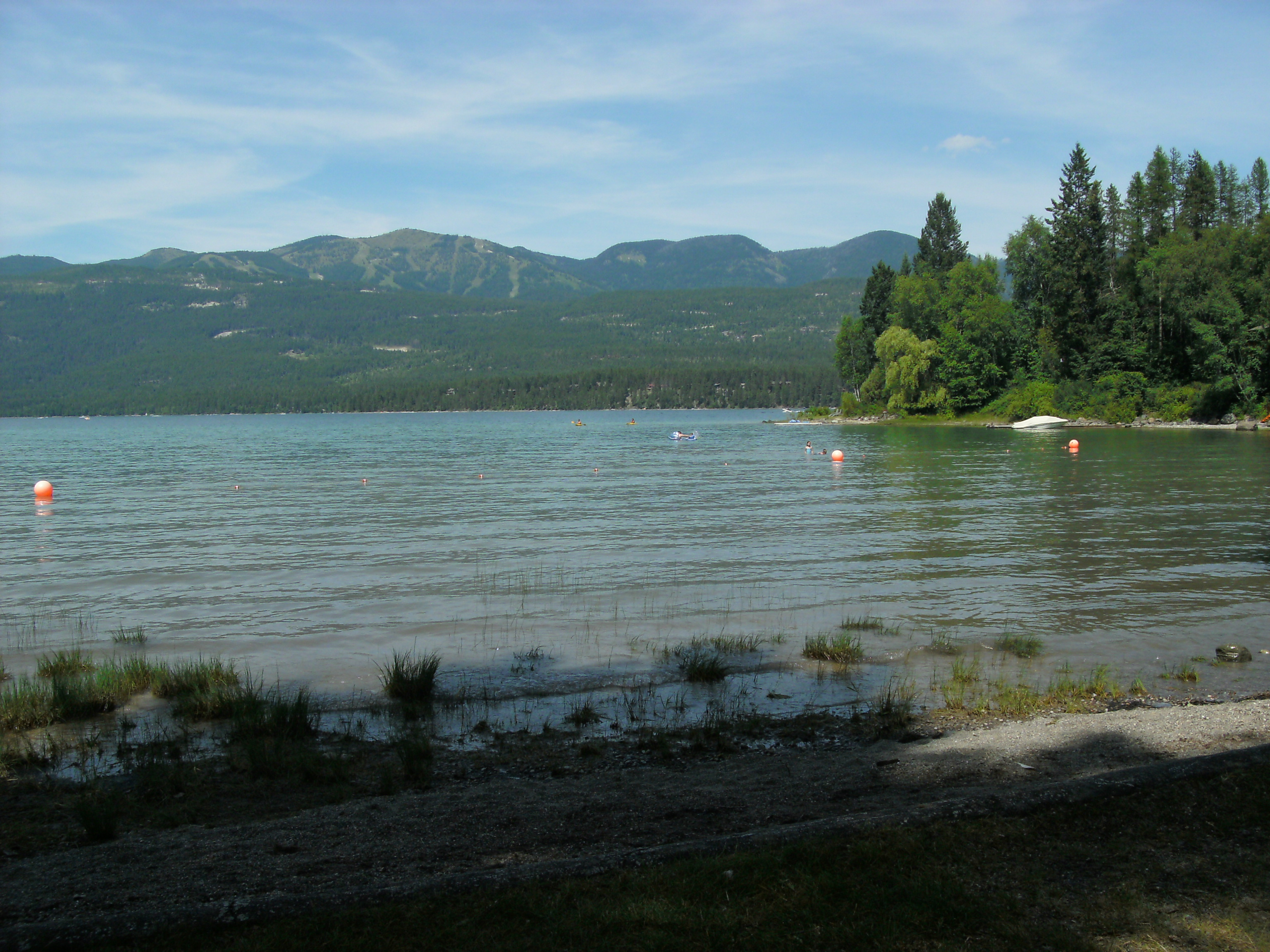

- Location within Montana
- Location: Flathead County, Montana, United States
- Nearest city: Whitefish, Montana
- Coordinates: 48°25′30″N 114°22′13″W
- Area: 10 acres (4.0 ha)
- Elevation: 3,031 ft (924 m)
- Designation: Montana state park
- Established: 1960
- Administrator: Montana Fish, Wildlife & Parks
- Website: Whitefish Lake State Park

Whitefish Lake State Park is a 10-acre (4.0 ha) public recreation area on Whitefish Lake off of U.S. Highway 93, two miles northwest of Whitefish, Montana. It offers boating, swimming, tent and RV camping, and fishing. Sites for hike-in and bike-in camping were added in 2016.
