= Whitefish Theatre Company =

Non-profit performing arts company

Coordinates: 48°24′44″N 114°20′12″W

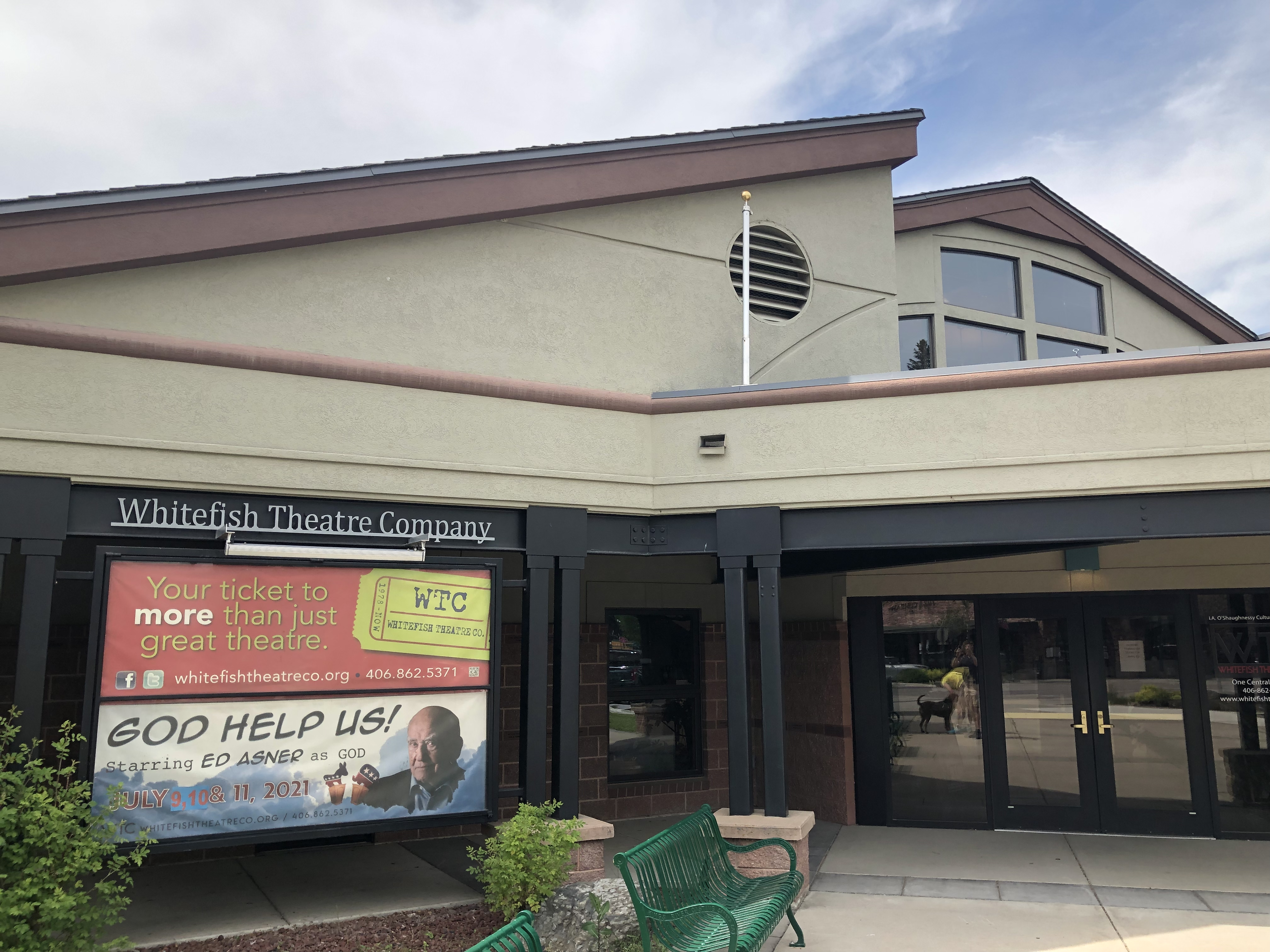
Main entrance go Whitefish theater company

The Whitefish Theatre Company (WTC) is a non-profit, community-based performing arts company that performs in the 326-seat I.A. O'Shaughnessy Cultural Arts Center located at 1 Central Avenue in Whitefish, Montana. The company, now in its 40th year, presents plays, concerts, music, dance and summer camps for local schools in the region.

WTC events are supported by grants from the National Endowment for the Arts, the Western States Arts Federation, and the Whitefish Community Foundation.
