= Libby station =

Station stop in Libby, Montana

Libby, MT
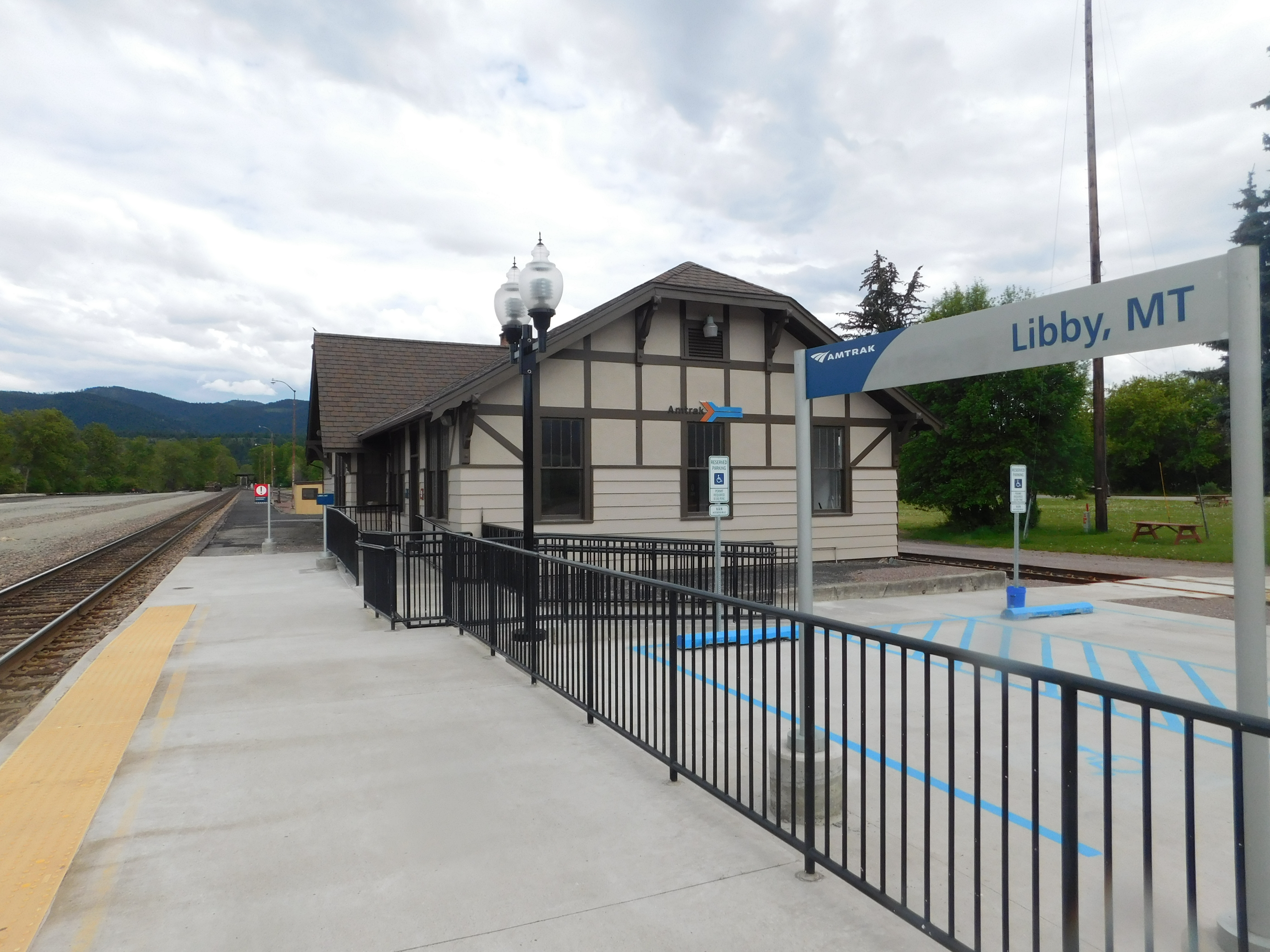
- Libby station in May 2017

General information
- Location: 100 Mineral Avenue; Libby, Montana; United States
- Coordinates: 48.3949°N 115.5488°W
- Owner: BNSF Railway
- Line: BNSF Kootenai River Subdivision
- Platforms: 1 side platform
- Tracks: 1

Construction
- Parking: Yes
- Accessible: Yes

Other information
- Station code: Amtrak: LIB

History
- Opened: June 18, 1893
- Rebuilt: October 15, 1940–January 24, 1941

Passengers
- FY 2025: 4,285 (Amtrak)

Services
Preceding station	Amtrak	Following station
Sandpoint toward Seattle or Portland	Empire Builder	Whitefish toward Chicago
Former services
Preceding station	Great Northern Railway	Following station
Kootenai Falls toward Seattle	Main Line	Ripley toward St. Paul
Location

Libby station is an Amtrak station in Libby, Montana, served by the Empire Builder. The station property, including the platform and parking area, is owned by BNSF Railway.

== History ==
In 1890, the Great Northern Railway established a station in Libby along its main line. The first train service arrived at the station on May 3, 1892, carrying passengers and freight. In 1970, the station became part of the Burlington Northern Railway following the merger of Great Northern into the company. In 1996, Burlington Northern merged with the Atchison, Topeka and Santa Fe Railway to form BNSF Railway, the current owner of the station property.

== Station ==
The station platform is uncovered and is adjacent to a small Swiss chalet style building used as a passenger waiting room. The station formerly had a second platform on the opposite side of the waiting room. The southern platform is no longer used, but the tracks remain in place.
