= Whitefish Lake (Montana) =

Lake in the American state of Montana

- epɫx̣ʷy̓u (Kalispel-Pend d'Oreille)
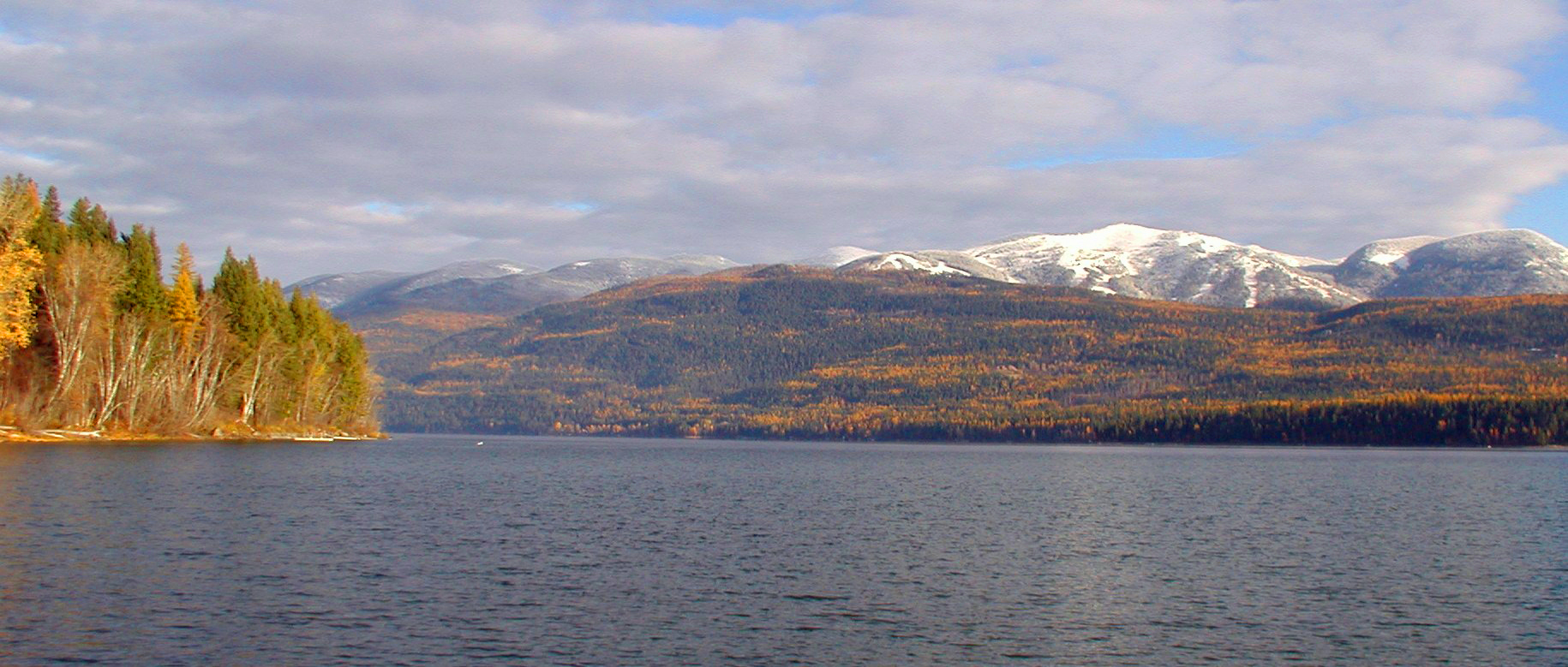
- View from Whitefish Lake State Park beach looking north to Whitefish Mountain Resort in autumn

- Location within Montana Location within the United States
- Location: Flathead County, Montana
- Coordinates: 48°27′04″N 114°22′53″W
- Primary outflows: Whitefish River
- Basin countries: United States
- Max. length: 5.8 miles (9.3 km)
- Max. width: 1.4 miles (2.3 km)
- Surface area: 5.2 square miles (13 km^{2})
- Average depth: 82 feet (25 m)
- Max. depth: 233 feet (71 m)
- Residence time: 2.6 years
- Shore length^{1}: 15.9 miles (25.6 km)
- Surface elevation: 2,999 feet (914 m)
- Settlements: Whitefish, Montana
- ^{1} Shore length is not a well-defined measure.

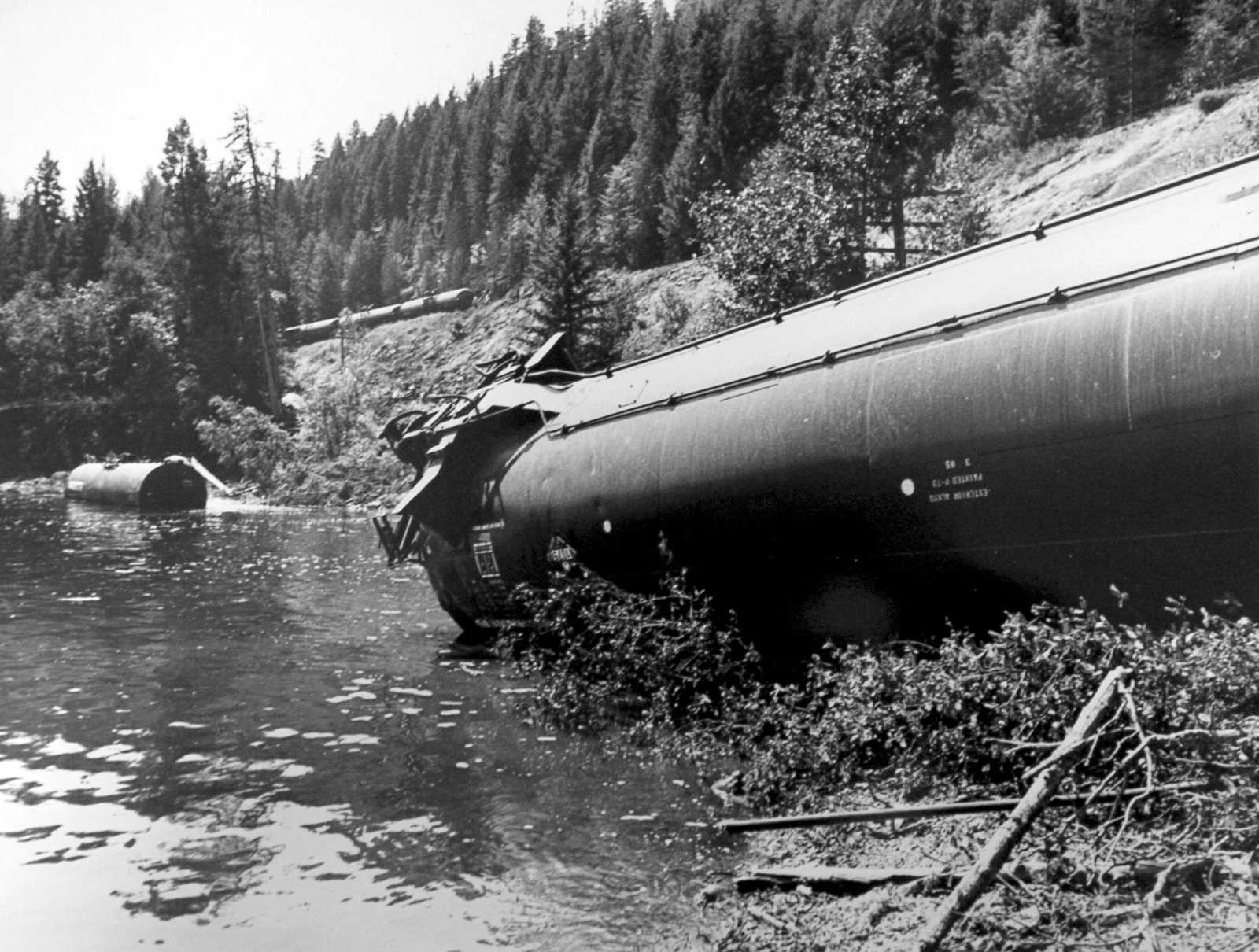
Burlington Northern Train Wreck and Oil Spill into Whitefish Lake (Montana) on July 31, 1989

Whitefish Lake (Salish: epɫx̣ʷy̓u) is a natural oligotrophic freshwater lake in Flathead County, Montana, United States.

== History ==
Whitefish Lake was named in the 1850s for the abundant mountain whitefish (Prosopium williamsoni) harvested there. The Salish refer to the lake as epɫx̣ʷy̓u, "has whitefish".

== Geography ==
Whitefish Lake is located northwest of the city of Whitefish, Montana, at an elevation of 2,999 feet (914 m). It lies between the southwest flank of the Whitefish Range and the northeast flank of Lion Mountain in Flathead County. This natural 5.2 square miles (13 km^{2}) lake has a maximum length of 5.8 miles (9.3 km) and width of 1.4 miles (2.3 km), and is 233 feet (71 m) at its deepest. Whitefish Lake has a surface elevation of 2,999 feet (914 m) and occupies a surface area of approximately 5.2 sq mi (13 km^{2}).

Tributaries to the lake include Swift Creek, which originates in Upper Whitefish Lake, and Lazy Creek, which enter at the northwestern head of the lake, and Hellroaring Creek on the eastern shore, and Beaver Creek which begins in Beaver Lake on the western shore. The lake has approximately 15.9 miles (25.6 km) of shoreline.

The lake's outflow is the Whitefish River, which is a tributary to the Stillwater River, which flows into the Flathead River about 1 mile (1.6 km) east of Kalispell.

== Ecology ==
Bull trout (Salvelinus confluentus) and westslope cutthroat trout (Oncorhynchus clarki lewisi) were the apex predator and pelagic surface feeder, historically, in Whitefish Lake. They persist in the lake but in greatly diminished numbers. The primary threat to native cutthroat trout is hybridization with non-native rainbow trout (Oncorhynchus mykiss). Other native fish species include the river's namesake mountain whitefish, largescale sucker (Catostomus macrocheilus), longnose sucker (Catostomus catostomus), northern pikeminnow (Ptychocheilus oregonensis), peamouth chub (Mylocheilus caurinus,), redside shiner (Richardsonius balteatus), fathead minnow (Pimephales promelas), and mottled sculpin (Cottus bondi) slimy sculpin (Cottus cognatus), and shorthead sculpin (Cottus confusus).

The lake's fish assemblage has been almost completely disrupted by twentieth-century introductions of non-native fishes and mysis shrimp (Mysida). Introduced non-native fish species include northern pike (Esox lucius) which preys on native trout species. Kokanee salmon, the landlocked form of sockeye salmon (Oncorhynchus nerka), were introduced to the lake in 1945 and spawned successfully for 35 years until competition for forage with introduced Mysis shrimp and predation from lake trout extirpated the kokanee. The rise in Mysida populations led to an increase in non-native lake trout (Salvelinus namaycush) numbers, the latter competing with bull trout and a predator of almost every native fish species in the lake. Non-native rainbow trout (Oncorhynchus mykiss) and brook trout (Salvelinus fontinalis) have also been introduced and compete with native bull and cutthroat trout. Introduced lake whitefish (Coregonus clupeaformis) are now abundant in the lake.

== Recreation ==
Fishing, kayaking, and boating are major recreational activities on the lake. Whitefish Lake State Park provides opportunities for camping, boating, and swimming, as does Whitefish City Beach, a sandy beach at the lake's outlet in the city of Whitefish.

The Whitefish Lake Triathlon, an annual summer event, draws in hundreds of athletes to the swim, bike, and run the lake and surrounding areas.

== See also ==
- List of lakes in Flathead County, Montana (M-Z)
- Whitefish River
- Whitefish Lake State Park
