= Whitefish station =

Railway station in Whitefish, Montana, US

Whitefish, MT
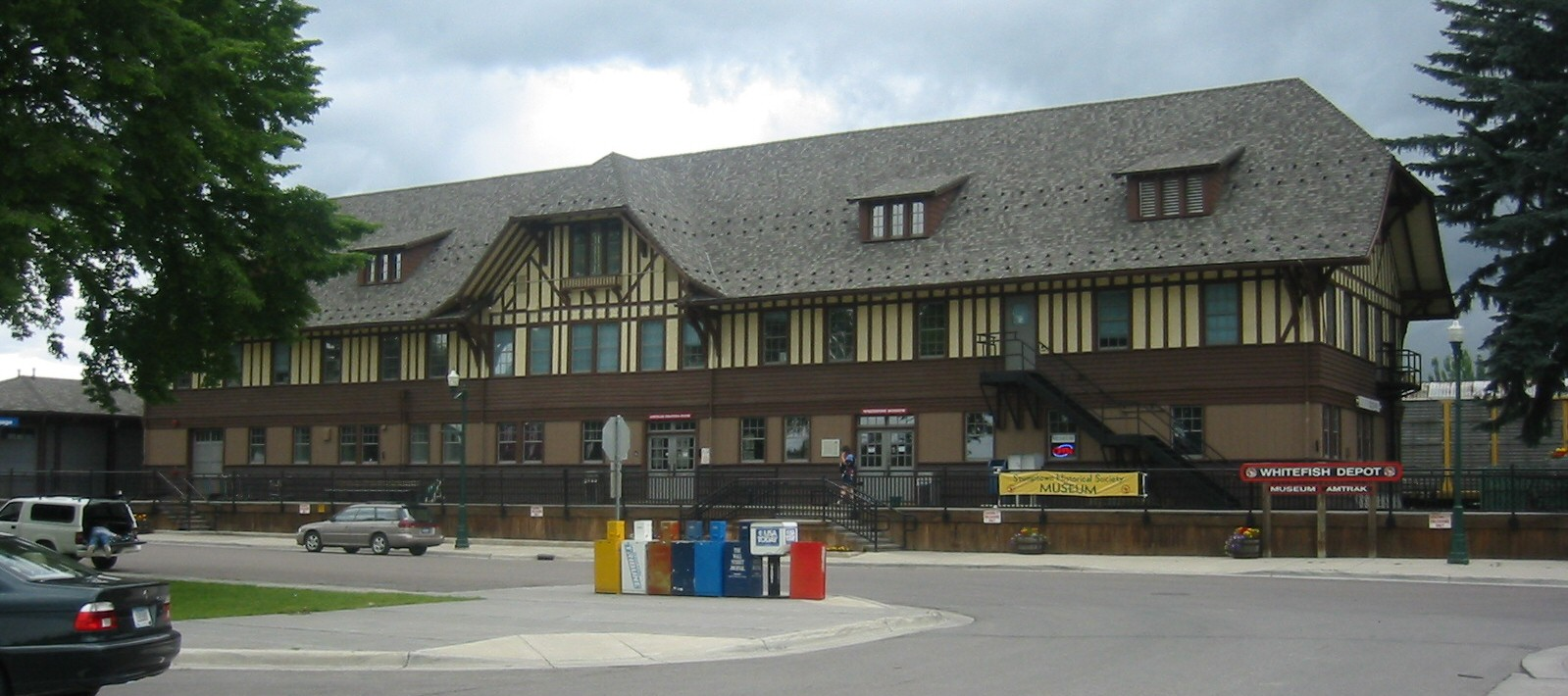

General information
- Location: 500 Depot Street; Whitefish, Montana; United States
- Coordinates: 48°24′49″N 114°20′08″W
- Owner: Stumptown Historical Society
- Line: BNSF Hi Line Subdivision
- Platforms: 1 side platform
- Tracks: 2
- Connections: Greyhound Lines

Construction
- Parking: 20 short term, 40 long term spaces
- Accessible: Yes

Other information
- Station code: Amtrak: WFH

History
- Opened: June 22, 1928

Passengers
- FY 2025: 42,767 (Amtrak)

Services
| Preceding station | Amtrak | Following station |
|---|---|---|
| Libby toward Seattle or Portland | Empire Builder | West Glacier toward Chicago |
Former services
| Preceding station | Great Northern Railway | Following station |
|---|---|---|
| Vista toward Seattle | Main Line | Half Moon toward St. Paul |
- Great Northern Railway Passenger and Freight Depot and Division Office
- U.S. National Register of Historic Places
- Location: Whitefish, Montana
- Area: 2.2 acres (0.89 ha)
- Architect: Thomas D'Arcy McMahon
- Architectural style: Tudor Revival
- NRHP reference No.: 02000766
- Added to NRHP: July 11, 2002
Location

Whitefish station is a stop on Amtrak's Empire Builder in Whitefish, Montana. In addition to the Empire Builder, a once-daily Greyhound Lines bus service also links the station to Kalispell and Missoula. A car rental agency operates a window within the station. The station and parking lot are owned by the Stumptown Historical Society. BNSF Railway leases office space on the upper floors of the station and owns the platform and track.

The Tudor Revival station building was listed on the National Register of Historic Places in 2002 and is known therein as the Great Northern Railway Passenger and Freight Depot and Division Office or as the Whitefish Depot.

Of the 12 Montana stations served by Amtrak, Whitefish is by far the busiest, boarding or detraining an average of about 170 passengers daily. Whitefish typically handles more than four times as many passengers as the next-busiest Montana station, which varies from year to year between East Glacier Park, Havre, and Shelby. It is the busiest station stop between the Pacific Ocean and St. Paul Union Depot on the Empire Builder route.

As of 2012, the Empire Builder stops at the station for 20 minutes. Whitefish marks the western end of the BNSF's Hi Line Subdivision and the eastern end of the Kootenai River Subdivision.

== History ==
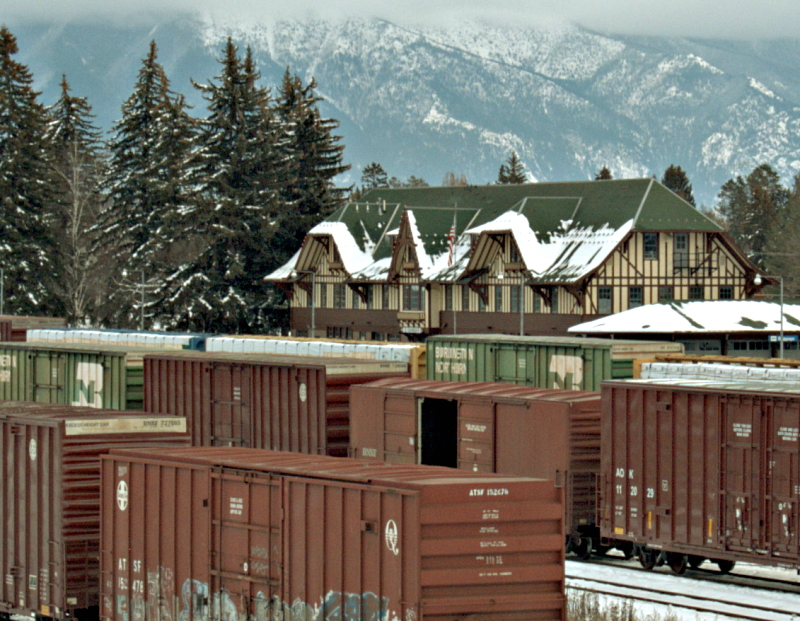
A trackside view of the depot.

The Great Northern Railway built the present Whitefish depot between September 10, 1927 and June 22, 1928. Architect Thomas D'Arcy McMahon designed the structure in a Tudor Revival style reminiscent of the Alpine resort hotels built by the railroad in nearby Glacier National Park and Waterton Lakes National Park during that same era, some of which were also designed by McMahon. The upper floors of the depot housed the railway's division offices.

By the 1980s the structure was deteriorating and the Burlington Northern Railroad (successor to the Great Northern) decided to vacate station in favor of a new building. After hearing the plan, Stumptown Historical Society approached the railroad and asked that the station be transferred for restoration. The transfer was completed in 1990 and Burlington Northern also donated money it had allocated for a new building to help fund the depot’s rehabilitation.

The station was closed between June 24 and July 17, 1992 due to a mold outbreak.

Stumptown started by renovating the upper stories of the depot and leased that space back to the BNSF Railway (successor to the Burlington Northern). Additional funding and the lease payments provided the money needed to renovate the first floor which is now leased to Amtrak and local vendors. The Historical Society also maintains a local history museum on the first floor adjacent to the waiting room. A Kenworth-Pacific bruck serving the local route from Kalispell between 1951 and 1971 is on display. The building was added to the National Register of Historic Places in 2002.

Recent additions include a baggage facility built in 1997 on the side of the station to better serve the large number of visitors during ski season. In 2011, Amtrak designed and constructed a new 1,200 foot long concrete platform, which includes an electric snow-melting system and better lighting.

== See also ==
- Great Northern Railway Passenger and Freight Depot
- National Register of Historic Places listings in Flathead County, Montana
