= Alpine Theatre Project =

- Address: PO Box 1959, Whitefish, Montana, 59937; Whitefish, Montana; United States
- Capacity: 454 seated
- Type: Regional

Construction
- Opened: 2007

Website
- https://atpwhitefish.org

Alpine Theatre Project is a 501(c)(3) nonprofit professional theatre company based in Whitefish, Montana. It presents musicals, plays, and concerts. It also provides education and outreach to students in Montana's Flathead Valley.

== About the Company ==
=== History ===
ATP was formed in December 2004, by actors David Ackroyd, Betsi Morrison, and Luke Walrath. All three actors moved to Montana's Flathead Valley after sustaining successful careers on stage, in film and on television. Alpine Theatre Project was formed with the vision of creating a professional regional theatre within the outdoor recreational environment of Northwest Montana. Its mission is "to imagine without boundaries, to create vibrant professional entertainment and transformative arts education, to inspire the audience, artists, and next generation." Its artists have performed in over 190 Broadway productions, won 4 Tony Awards, 7 Emmy Awards, 4 Golden Globe Awards, and 1 Academy Award.

=== Structure ===
Alpine Theatre Project is governed by a 11-member honorary board and a 12-member board of directors. It is managed by a full-time staff of 2. It hires full-time seasonal staff for its operations throughout the year.

=== Performance Space ===
Alpine Theatre Project (ATP) mounts its major productions in the Whitefish Performing Art Center, a 454 seat auditorium that is housed in the Whitefish Middle School and is owned by the Whitefish School District. The $5.5 million renovation of the space was funded through private community donations.

ATP's base of operations is in "The Garage," a converted auto shop at 6464 Highway 93 South in Whitefish. Here, the company conducts its Academy classes and mounts smaller cabaret style shows. The Garage is also home to ATP's annual Giving Tuesday Live Stream Thank-a-thon, in which the company thanks donors, displays examples of its work, and raises funds.

=== Union Affiliations ===
ATP operates under contract agreements with the following professional theatrical unions:

- Actors Equity Association - the national labor union for professional stage actors and managers
- United Scenic Artists - the national labor union for theatrical designers and scenic artists
- Society of Stage Directors and Choreographers

== Programs ==
=== Summer Season ===
Alpine Theatre Project produces the bulk of its shows during the summer months. It features book musicals, concerts, original productions, plays and its unique "Outside the Box," lightly staged play readings performed in a locale that is consistent with the content of the play.

=== Yuletide Affair ===
ATP produces the Yuletide Affair every December. This annual holiday concert changes format from year to year and features holiday songs and skits with a roster of ATP recurring artists. Beginning with the first "Yuletide Affair" in 2004 and continuing through 2019, every performance of the show has been sold out.

=== Onstage with the Glacier Symphony and Chorale ===
In January 2007, ATP began collaborating with the Glacier Symphony and Chorale in presenting classic musicals in concert with a full symphony orchestra.

=== Other programs ===
Alpine Theatre Project also produces other concerts and fundraisers throughout the year. These concerts vary in content and format and take place in various communities around the Flathead Valley. ATP was the birthplace of two world-premiere plays—"Another Side of the Island, “created by and starring Academy Award winner Olympia Dukakis and “Stories by Heart,” created by and starring Emmy, Tony, and Golden Globe Award winner, John Lithgow.

== Education & Outreach ==
=== Alpine Theatre Project Kids! (ATP Kids!) ===
The comedy troupe consists of six core members: Brian Colonna, Hannah Duggan, Erik Edborg, Erin Rollman, Samantha Schmitz, and Evan Weissman. The group employs a non-hierarchical organizational structure to facilitate collaborative involvement across all aspects of creating and producing their sketches and web series. Rather than fixed roles, the six performers all contribute to writing, acting, set design, directing, producing, and providing technical support for their video content.

=== Internships ===
The ATP Internship program began in 2005, to offer theatre students in high-school and college a practical arts education. Interns work alongside ATP professionals during the summer season in every production department, including administrative. Students are eligible for college credit.

== Production history ==
2004

- Yuletide Affair 1

2005

- My Fair Lady
- K2
- Yuletide Affair 2

2006

- Camelot
- Picasso at the Lapin Agile
- Yuletide Affair 3

2007

- The Sound of Music with the Glacier Symphony & Chorale
- Godspell
- I Love You, You're, Perfect, Now Change
- Moonlight & Magnolias
- Dracula
- Yuletide Affair 4

2008

- West Side Story with the Glacier Symphony & Chorale
- The Full Monty
- Pete 'n' Keely
- Another Side of the Island starring Olympia Dukakis
- Yuletide Affair 5

2023

- Million Dollar Quartet
- Cats the musical
- Rocky Horror Picture Show, performed via a shadow-cast, where the movie is projected on a screen and actors mimic what happens in front of it to a live audience
- Yuletide Affair Kids
- Yultide Affair 20

2024

- Broadway Concert Series
- ATP Kids: The Wizard Of Oz
- Yuletide Affair 21
