= Whitefish Bay (disambiguation) =

Whitefish Bay is a large bay on the eastern end of Lake Superior.

It can also refer to:

== Places ==
- Whitefish Bay, Wisconsin, a village in the United States
  - Whitefish Bay High School
- Whitefish Bay, Door County, Wisconsin, a community in the United States
- Whitefish Bay, Ontario, a community in the Lac Seul 28 Indian reserve of the Lac Seul First Nation
- First Nations reserves in northwestern Ontario, Canada:
  - Whitefish Bay 32A
  - Whitefish Bay 33A
  - Whitefish Bay 34A

== Other ==
- Whitefish Bay (2012 ship), a lake freighter operating on the North American Great Lakes
- Naotkamegwanning First Nation, formerly known as Whitefish Bay First Nation, an Ojibwa First Nation in Kenora District, Ontario, Canada

== See also ==
- Whitefish (disambiguation)
