= Whitefish River (Montana) =

River in Montana, United States

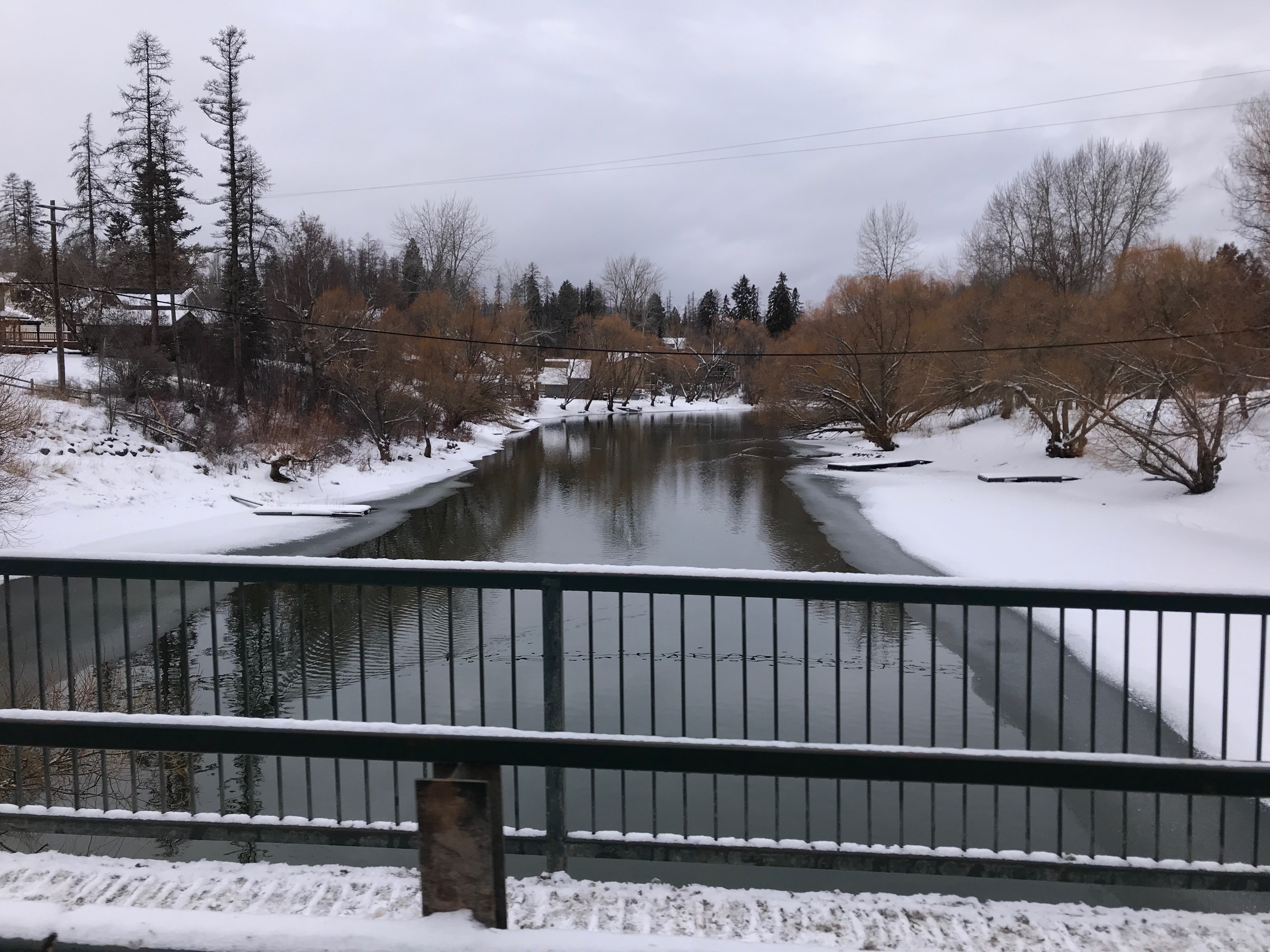
- Whitefish River looking west from Baker Avenue Bridge in Whitefish
- Native name: epɫx̣ʷy̓u (Kalispel-Pend d'Oreille)

Location
- Country: Flathead County, Montana

Physical characteristics
- Source
  - location: Outlet of Whitefish Lake
  - coordinates: 48°24′55″N 114°21′12″W
  - elevation: 2,999 feet (914 m)
- Mouth
  - location: Confluence with Stillwater River just before the Flathead River
  - coordinates: 48°12′44″N 114°17′13″W
  - elevation: 2,910 feet (890 m)
- Length: 24.8-mile-long (39.9 km)
- Discharge
  - average: 233 cuft/s

Basin features
- River system: Columbia River
- Tributaries
  - left: Cow Creek, Haskill Creek, Walker Creek

The Whitefish River is a 24.8-mile-long (39.9 km) southward-flowing stream originating at the outlet of Whitefish Lake. The river is a tributary of the Stillwater River just before it reaches the Flathead River in Flathead County, in the U.S. state of Montana. The Whitefish River is part of the Columbia River basin, as the Flathead River is a tributary of Clark Fork, which is a tributary to the Pend Oreille River, which is a tributary to the Columbia River.

== History ==
Whitefish River and Whitefish Lake were named in the 1850s for the abundant whitefish harvested there. The Salish call them epɫx̣ʷy̓u, "has whitefish".

== Course ==
The Whitefish River originates in Whitefish Lake and flows generally south until it joins the Stillwater River just before the Flathead River about 1 mile (1.6 km) east of Kalispell. The river's uppermost reach leaves the lake and flows through the city of Whitefish for 2.5 miles (4.0 km). The Whitefish River has three tributaries of significance. Small Cow Creek flows southwest 4.5 miles (7.2 km) and discharges into the river 2 miles (3.2 km) downstream from Whitefish Lake. Next, several headwater tributaries beginning in the Whitefish Mountain Resort form Haskill Creek which flows 11 miles (18 km) south to the Whitefish River 4.5 miles (7.2 km) downstream from Whitefish Lake. The third tributary to Whitefish River is Walker Creek which begins in the southern flank of the Whitefish Range and joins the river 5 miles (8.0 km) below the Whitefish Lake outlet.

== Ecology ==
The Montana Department of Environmental Quality (DEQ) determined in 2014 that the Whitefish River was temperature-impaired, meaning that high temperature impairs aquatic life and that a reduction in water temperature of 0.99 °F was recommended.

Bull trout (Salvelinus confluentus) and westslope cutthroat trout (Oncorhynchus clarki lewisi) are considers indicator species of stream health, and are present in the Whitefish River, although in greatly diminished numbers. The primary threat to native cutthroat trout is hybridization with non-native rainbow trout (Oncorhynchus mykiss). A 2001 genetics study of cutthroat trout in the river showed 98.2% rainbow trout and 1.8% westslope cutthroat trout genetics in a sample of 15 fish. Other native fish species include the river's namesake mountain whitefish (Prosopium williamsoni), largescale sucker ((Catostomus macrocheilus)), longnose sucker ((Catostomus catostomus)), northern pikeminnow ((Ptychocheilus oregonensis)), peamouth chub (Mylocheilus caurinus,), redside shiner ((Richardsonius balteatus)), and slimy sculpin (Cottus cognatus). Non-native fish species include northern pike (Esox lucius) which preys on native trout species.

== See also ==
- Whitefish Lake
- Montana Stream Access Law
- List of rivers of Montana
- Tributaries of the Columbia River
