= MT 40 =

MT40 or MT-40 may refer to:

- Montana Highway 40
- Casio MT-40, an electronic keyboard
