= Whitefish Range =

Mountain range in Canada and the United States

- Whitefish-MacDonald Range
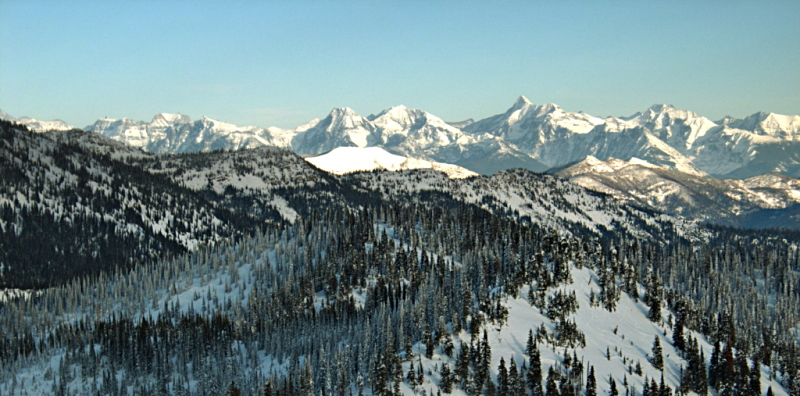
- Whitefish Range from Whitefish, Montana

Highest point
- Peak: Mount Doupe, British Columbia, Canada
- Elevation: 8,740 ft (2,660 m)
- Coordinates: 48°51′N 114°37′W

Dimensions
- Length: 76 mi (122 km) North-south
- Width: 58 mi (93 km) East-west
- Area: 1,726 mi^{2} (4,470 km^{2})

Geography
- Location within Montana
- Countries: United States and Canada
- States: Montana and British Columbia
- Settlements: Columbia Falls, Montana and Eureka, Montana
- Parent range: Border Ranges
- Borders on: North Fork Flathead River and Kootenay River

The Whitefish Range is a mountain range stretching north-south from British Columbia, Canada to Montana, United States. It is about 76 miles (122 km) long and 58 miles (93 km) wide. Water flowing from its east side drains down the North Fork Flathead River and its west side drains into the Whitefish River, both part of the Columbia River drainage basin.

The mountain range is located north of Columbia Falls and Whitefish in the Flathead Valley, and east of Eureka. The Flathead River separates it from the Swan Range, which would otherwise continue the mountain range southwards.

The Whitefish Range, however, is not particularly high. The highest peaks in the U.S. are Nasukoin Mountain, 8,086 feet (2,465 m), and Lake Mountain, 7,814 feet (2,382 m). In Canada, the highest peak is Mount Doupe, 8,740 feet (2,660 m).

The Whitefish Range is located west of Glacier National Park and consists mostly of wilderness. It supports a variety of conifers including western red cedar, Douglas fir, lodgepole pine and western larch, but much of the region has been devastated by forest fires. The area also supports large mammals including black bears, grizzly bears, mountain lions, and other species of fish, small mammals, and amphibians.

In the U.S., a large portion of the range has been removed from multiple use designation, including the 34,000-acre Ten Lakes Wilderness Study Area on the Kootenai National Forest. Ten Lakes WSA contains more than 89 miles of trails, many mountain lakes, alpine peaks, and views into Canada and Glacier National Park.

In Canada, the Whitefish Range is referred to as the Galton and MacDonald ranges.

== Climate ==
Poorman Mountain (Montana) is a mountain peak in Montana within the Whitefish Range. Poorman Mountain has a subarctic climate (Köppen Dfc).

There is no weather station, but this climate table contains interpolated data.

Climate data for Poorman Mountain 48.9599 N, 114.9349 W, Elevation: 7,382 ft (2,250 m) (1991–2020 normals)
Month	Jan	Feb	Mar	Apr	May	Jun	Jul	Aug	Sep	Oct	Nov	Dec	Year
Mean daily maximum °F (°C)	22.6 (−5.2)	24.1 (−4.4)	30.0 (−1.1)	37.2 (2.9)	46.3 (7.9)	52.5 (11.4)	62.8 (17.1)	63.2 (17.3)	53.2 (11.8)	38.8 (3.8)	27.3 (−2.6)	21.2 (−6.0)	39.9 (4.4)
Daily mean °F (°C)	17.1 (−8.3)	17.4 (−8.1)	21.8 (−5.7)	28.0 (−2.2)	36.3 (2.4)	42.3 (5.7)	51.3 (10.7)	51.5 (10.8)	43.1 (6.2)	31.6 (−0.2)	22.0 (−5.6)	16.1 (−8.8)	31.5 (−0.3)
Mean daily minimum °F (°C)	11.7 (−11.3)	10.6 (−11.9)	13.7 (−10.2)	18.9 (−7.3)	26.3 (−3.2)	32.2 (0.1)	39.7 (4.3)	39.8 (4.3)	33.0 (0.6)	24.4 (−4.2)	16.6 (−8.6)	11.0 (−11.7)	23.2 (−4.9)
Average precipitation inches (mm)	8.18 (208)	6.58 (167)	7.45 (189)	6.66 (169)	6.29 (160)	8.06 (205)	2.57 (65)	2.00 (51)	3.31 (84)	5.38 (137)	7.95 (202)	7.59 (193)	72.02 (1,830)
Source: PRISM Climate Group

There is a SNOTEL weather station below Stahl Peak (Montana). Stahl Peak also has a subarctic climate (Köppen Dfc) but has an overall warmer climate, due to its lower elevation.

Climate data for Stahl Peak, Montana, 1991–2020 normals: 6030ft (1838m)
Month	Jan	Feb	Mar	Apr	May	Jun	Jul	Aug	Sep	Oct	Nov	Dec	Year
Mean daily maximum °F (°C)	25.1 (−3.8)	27.8 (−2.3)	34.8 (1.6)	43.0 (6.1)	51.7 (10.9)	56.5 (13.6)	66.5 (19.2)	66.1 (18.9)	55.9 (13.3)	41.6 (5.3)	29.9 (−1.2)	23.5 (−4.7)	43.5 (6.4)
Daily mean °F (°C)	20.2 (−6.6)	21.4 (−5.9)	26.9 (−2.8)	33.8 (1.0)	41.9 (5.5)	46.8 (8.2)	55.0 (12.8)	54.8 (12.7)	46.6 (8.1)	35.2 (1.8)	25.1 (−3.8)	18.9 (−7.3)	35.6 (2.0)
Mean daily minimum °F (°C)	15.3 (−9.3)	15.1 (−9.4)	19.1 (−7.2)	24.5 (−4.2)	32.0 (0.0)	37.0 (2.8)	43.6 (6.4)	43.5 (6.4)	37.2 (2.9)	28.7 (−1.8)	20.3 (−6.5)	14.2 (−9.9)	27.5 (−2.5)
Average precipitation inches (mm)	7.11 (181)	5.49 (139)	6.45 (164)	5.44 (138)	5.72 (145)	6.47 (164)	2.27 (58)	1.97 (50)	3.25 (83)	5.38 (137)	6.98 (177)	6.39 (162)	62.92 (1,598)
Source 1: XMACIS2
Source 2: NOAA (Precipitation)

== See also ==
- List of mountain ranges in Montana
