= Stillwater River (Flathead County, Montana) =

River in Montana, United States

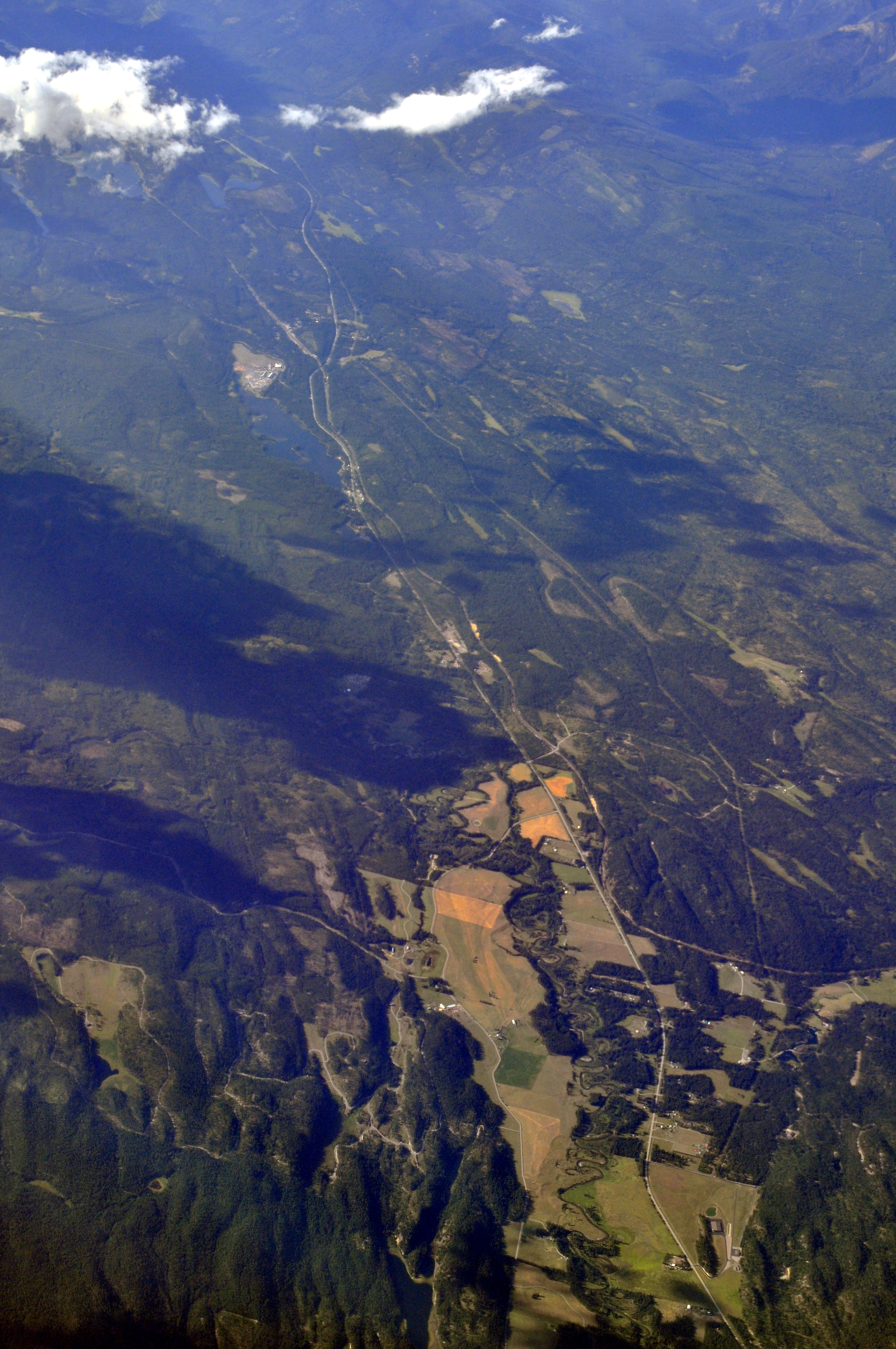
- Aerial view of Stillwater River valley from the south (August 2013) with Lower Stillwater Lake slightly above the center of the image

Location
- Country: Flathead and Lincoln County, Montana

Physical characteristics
- Source
  - coordinates: 48°48′06″N 114°42′43″W
- Mouth
  - coordinates: 48°09′54″N 114°15′39″W
  - elevation: 2,897 feet (883 m)
- Discharge
  - average: 360 cuft/s

Basin features
- River system: Columbia River
- Tributaries
  - left: Evers Creek; Good Creek; Bowen Creek; Robertson Creek; Plume Creek; Daggett Creek; Alder Creek; Gregg Creek; Miller Creek; Potter Creek; Gergen Creek

The Stillwater River rises 15 miles south of the border between Montana (United States) and Alberta (Canada), west of Glacier National Park in the Kootenai National Forest. It runs mainly south to Duck Lake, then Upper Stillwater Lake, Lagoni Lake and on to Lower Stillwater Lake. It then flows south to Kalispell where it joins the Whitefish River, very near where that river enters the Flathead River.

== See also ==
- List of rivers of Montana
- Montana Stream Access Law
