= Whitefish, Montana =

City in Montana, United States

- City
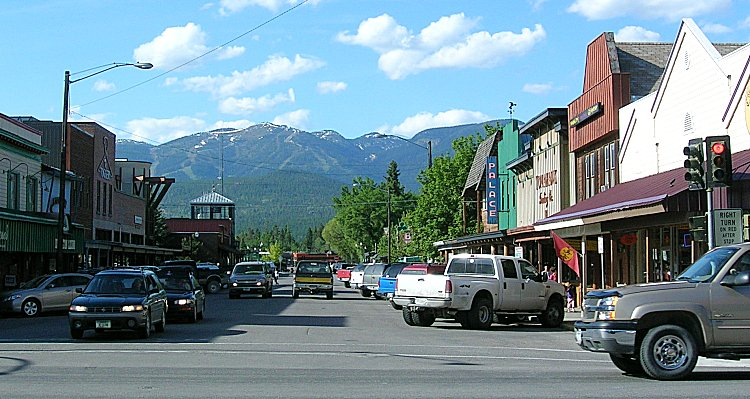
- Looking north from downtown Whitefish

- Seal
- Motto: "Montana's outdoor recreation playground"
- Location of Whitefish, Montana
- Coordinates: 48°25′22″N 114°21′24″W
- Country: United States
- State: Montana
- County: Flathead

Government
  - Mayor: John Muhlfeld

Area
  - Total: 12.36 sq mi (32.00 km^{2})
  - Land: 6.98 sq mi (18.09 km^{2})
  - Water: 5.37 sq mi (13.91 km^{2})
- Elevation: 2,999 ft (914 m)

Population (2020)
  - Total: 7,751
  - Density: 1,110/sq mi (428.4/km^{2})
- Time zone: UTC−7 (Mountain (MST))
  - Summer (DST): UTC−6 (MDT)
- ZIP code: 59937
- Area code: 406
- FIPS code: 30-79825
- GNIS feature ID: 2412257
- Website: Official website

Whitefish (Salish: epɫx̣ʷy̓u, "has whitefish") is a city in Flathead County, Montana, United States. According to the 2020 United States census, the city had a population of 7,751.

== History ==
Archaeological records indicate that native American tribes shared hunting grounds in the area, most notably the Kutenai, the Pend d'Oreilles, and the Bitterroot Salish. The Kootenai lived in the area for more than 14,000 years, inhabiting the mountainous terrain west of the Continental Divide, and traveled east of the divide for occasional buffalo hunts. Though trappers, traders, and waves of westward immigrants passed through the area during the second half of the century, and a group of Métis (mixed race descendants of fur traders, trappers and Native Americans) lived around the site of Whitefish (later largely moving south to the Flathead Indian Reservation), the first permanent settler is identified as John Morton who built a cabin on the shore of Whitefish Lake, just west of the mouth of the Whitefish River. Morton was joined by the local logging industry forefathers—including the Baker and Hutchinson brothers—in the early 1890s. Logging crews "boomed-up" their logs behind a dam built at the river mouth by the Boston & Montana Commercial Company, which, when opened, created a rush of water that helped float the logs down the river to Kalispell.

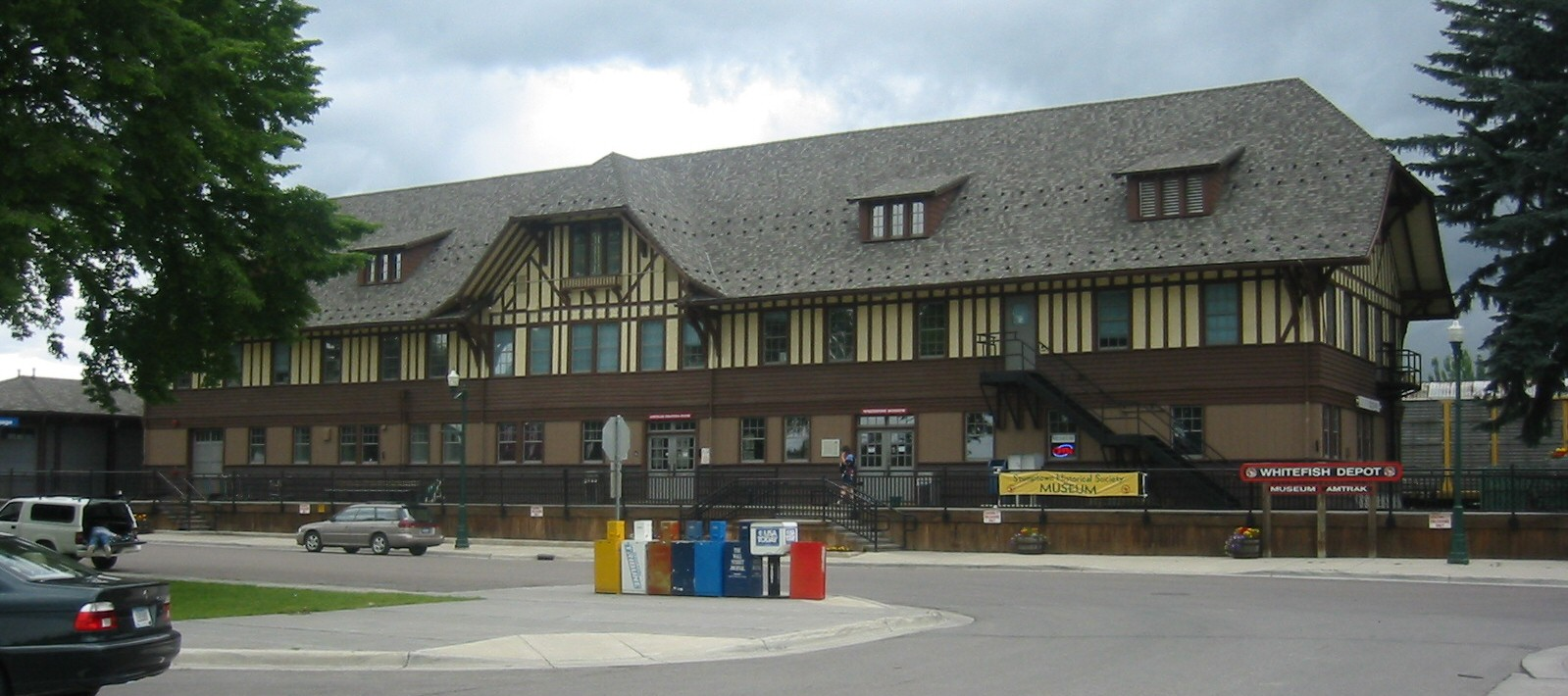
Whitefish Depot

The Great Northern Railway originally built its main line south of Whitefish. When the Great Northern rerouted the road in 1904 to avoid the steep Haskell Pass between Kalispell and Libby, preferring a longer but more gentle grade via Eureka, the development of what is now Whitefish was sparked. The town incorporated in 1905 and automatically became a city when its population reached 1,000 residents by 1910. The area was originally known as Stumptown due to the abundant amount of timber that had to be cleared to build the railroad and town, and because tree stumps were left in the streets throughout downtown. Early residents of the town worked in nearby logging industries and for the railroad. Some of the city's railroad workers were injured and two died in the 1966 Great Northern Buelow collision, an accident that affected many in the area. In 2006, more than 68,000 passengers embarked and disembarked through the historic Whitefish Depot, a major stop on Amtrak's Empire Builder line, with many of those passengers headed to the ski resort on Big Mountain and Glacier National Park.

Skiing has been part of the Whitefish area for more than 50 years. In 1937, the Whitefish Lake Ski Club obtained a special permit from the U.S. Forest Service that enabled them to build cabins and trails in the Hell Roaring Creek area. Great Falls businessmen Ed Schenck and George Prentice recognized the area's potential and, after World War II, began efforts to develop a full-fledged ski resort on the mountain with local people donating labor, preparing the slopes, even giving up free time to help push through an all-weather mountain road. On December 14, 1947, Schenck, Prentice, and a thousand townsfolk stood on the newly christened ski resort's slopes to watch the brand new T-Bar lift bring their community vision to life. The Whitefish Mountain Resort, built with community effort, attracted visitors.

The city started a curfew siren in 1919 that they called the "ding-dong ordinance". The historic siren was restored to the new city hall in 2017.

== Geography ==
The town is located on the western side of the continental divide, near Glacier National Park. Whitefish Lake is a 5.2 square miles (13 km^{2}) natural lake with maximum length 5.8 miles (9.3 km) and width 1.4 miles (2.3 km) and is 233 feet (71 m) at its deepest. The Whitefish River bisects the town of Whitefish as it courses south by southeast to briefly join the Stillwater River before its flows enter the Flathead River.

The historic district of Whitefish is a neighborhood called "The Avenues". This neighborhood is bordered by East 2nd Street to the north, Kalispell Avenue to the west, East 7th Street to the south, and Pine Avenue to the east. It is next to downtown, with many of its houses on the historic registry.

=== Climate ===
According to the Köppen Climate Classification system, Whitefish has a humid continental climate, abbreviated "Dfb" on climate maps. Large seasonal temperature differences typify this climatic region, with warm to hot (and often humid) summers and cold (sometimes severely cold) winters.

Climate data for Whitefish, Montana, 1991–2020 normals, extremes 1941–2014
| Month | Jan | Feb | Mar | Apr | May | Jun | Jul | Aug | Sep | Oct | Nov | Dec | Year |
|---|---|---|---|---|---|---|---|---|---|---|---|---|---|
| Record high °F (°C) | 50 (10) | 63 (17) | 74 (23) | 79 (26) | 89 (32) | 95 (35) | 103 (39) | 100 (38) | 94 (34) | 80 (27) | 69 (21) | 47 (8) | 103 (39) |
| Mean maximum °F (°C) | 43.1 (6.2) | 46.8 (8.2) | 59.4 (15.2) | 73.5 (23.1) | 82.6 (28.1) | 87.8 (31.0) | 94.0 (34.4) | 92.8 (33.8) | 84.9 (29.4) | 71.4 (21.9) | 52.2 (11.2) | 41.7 (5.4) | 95.3 (35.2) |
| Mean daily maximum °F (°C) | 29.0 (−1.7) | 33.9 (1.1) | 42.8 (6.0) | 53.2 (11.8) | 63.5 (17.5) | 69.8 (21.0) | 80.6 (27.0) | 80.0 (26.7) | 68.7 (20.4) | 52.6 (11.4) | 37.5 (3.1) | 28.9 (−1.7) | 53.4 (11.9) |
| Daily mean °F (°C) | 22.4 (−5.3) | 25.1 (−3.8) | 32.8 (0.4) | 41.6 (5.3) | 51.2 (10.7) | 57.4 (14.1) | 65.4 (18.6) | 64.1 (17.8) | 54.4 (12.4) | 41.7 (5.4) | 30.8 (−0.7) | 23.4 (−4.8) | 42.5 (5.8) |
| Mean daily minimum °F (°C) | 15.9 (−8.9) | 16.4 (−8.7) | 22.7 (−5.2) | 29.9 (−1.2) | 38.9 (3.8) | 45.0 (7.2) | 50.2 (10.1) | 48.2 (9.0) | 40.2 (4.6) | 30.9 (−0.6) | 24.0 (−4.4) | 17.9 (−7.8) | 31.7 (−0.2) |
| Mean minimum °F (°C) | −7.2 (−21.8) | −3.4 (−19.7) | 6.8 (−14.0) | 19.6 (−6.9) | 27.2 (−2.7) | 34.0 (1.1) | 40.3 (4.6) | 37.8 (3.2) | 29.4 (−1.4) | 17.5 (−8.1) | 7.0 (−13.9) | −2.7 (−19.3) | −14.9 (−26.1) |
| Record low °F (°C) | −26 (−32) | −27 (−33) | −15 (−26) | 11 (−12) | 19 (−7) | 28 (−2) | 32 (0) | 30 (−1) | 19 (−7) | −2 (−19) | −13 (−25) | −33 (−36) | −33 (−36) |
| Average precipitation inches (mm) | 1.84 (47) | 1.26 (32) | 1.27 (32) | 1.61 (41) | 1.99 (51) | 3.20 (81) | 1.40 (36) | 0.89 (23) | 1.25 (32) | 1.45 (37) | 1.70 (43) | 2.07 (53) | 19.93 (508) |
| Average snowfall inches (cm) | 16.5 (42) | 7.0 (18) | 8.0 (20) | 1.6 (4.1) | 0.1 (0.25) | 0.0 (0.0) | 0.0 (0.0) | 0.0 (0.0) | 0.0 (0.0) | 0.4 (1.0) | 8.3 (21) | 21.2 (54) | 63.1 (160.35) |
| Average extreme snow depth inches (cm) | 16.3 (41) | 15.6 (40) | 13.4 (34) | 3.6 (9.1) | 0.0 (0.0) | 0.0 (0.0) | 0.0 (0.0) | 0.0 (0.0) | 0.0 (0.0) | 0.6 (1.5) | 4.3 (11) | 12.1 (31) | 18.9 (48) |
| Average precipitation days (≥ 0.01 in) | 13.3 | 8.8 | 10.2 | 10.0 | 12.2 | 14.2 | 7.5 | 6.3 | 7.5 | 9.2 | 10.3 | 12.5 | 112.0 |
| Average snowy days (≥ 0.1 in) | 9.7 | 5.8 | 4.4 | 1.3 | 0.1 | 0.0 | 0.0 | 0.0 | 0.0 | 0.4 | 4.3 | 9.1 | 35.1 |
Source 1: NOAA
Source 2: National Weather Service (mean maxima/minima, snow depth 1981–2010)

== Demographics ==
Historical population
| Census | Pop. | Note | %± |
|---|---|---|---|
| 1890 | 640 | | — |
| 1900 | 446 | | −30.3% |
| 1910 | 417 | | −6.5% |
| 1920 | 574 | | 37.6% |
| 1930 | 575 | | 0.2% |
| 1940 | 858 | | 49.2% |
| 1950 | 1,025 | | 19.5% |
| 1960 | 1,519 | | 48.2% |
| 1970 | 3,349 | | 120.5% |
| 1980 | 3,703 | | 10.6% |
| 1990 | 4,368 | | 18.0% |
| 2000 | 5,032 | | 15.2% |
| 2010 | 6,357 | | 26.3% |
| 2020 | 7,751 | | 21.9% |
U.S. Decennial Census

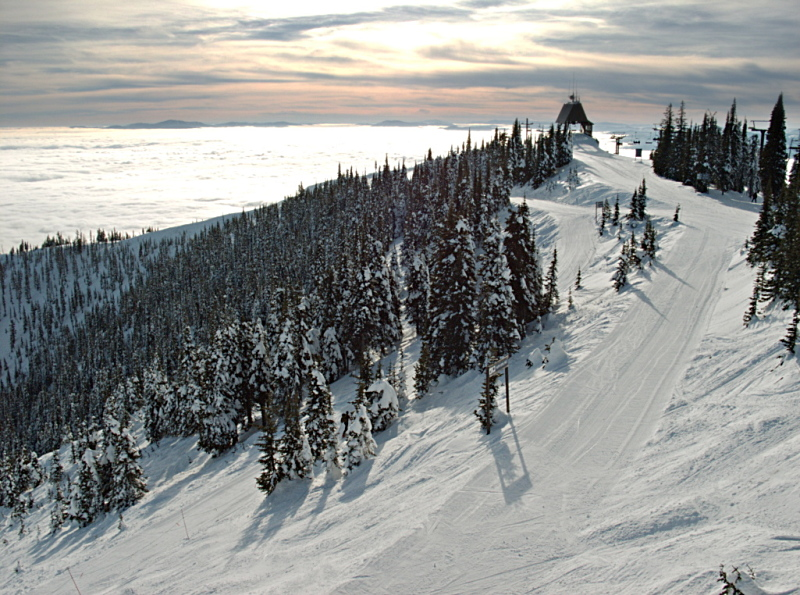
View from the top of Big Mountain, near Whitefish, in winter

=== 2020 census ===
As of the 2020 census, Whitefish had a population of 7,751. The median age was 43.0 years. 18.2% of residents were under the age of 18 and 21.1% of residents were 65 years of age or older. For every 100 females there were 98.7 males, and for every 100 females age 18 and over there were 95.8 males age 18 and over.

98.6% of residents lived in urban areas, while 1.4% lived in rural areas.

There were 3,620 households in Whitefish, of which 23.1% had children under the age of 18 living in them. Of all households, 42.1% were married-couple households, 22.5% were households with a male householder and no spouse or partner present, and 27.6% were households with a female householder and no spouse or partner present. About 35.9% of all households were made up of individuals and 14.5% had someone living alone who was 65 years of age or older.

There were 4,650 housing units, of which 22.2% were vacant. The homeowner vacancy rate was 3.0% and the rental vacancy rate was 7.8%.

Racial composition as of the 2020 census
| Race | Number | Percent |
|---|---|---|
| White | 7,113 | 91.8% |
| Black or African American | 25 | 0.3% |
| American Indian and Alaska Native | 45 | 0.6% |
| Asian | 59 | 0.8% |
| Native Hawaiian and Other Pacific Islander | 6 | 0.1% |
| Some other race | 77 | 1.0% |
| Two or more races | 426 | 5.5% |
| Hispanic or Latino (of any race) | 221 | 2.9% |

=== 2010 census ===
As of the census of 2010, there were 6,357 people, 2,982 households, and 1,562 families living in the city. The population density was 988.6 inhabitants per square mile (381.7/km^{2}). There were 4,086 housing units at an average density of 635.5 per square mile (245.4/km^{2}). The racial makeup of the city was 95.8% White, 0.5% African American, 0.8% Native American, 0.8% Asian, 0.1% Pacific Islander, 0.3% from other races, and 1.7% from two or more races. Hispanic or Latino of any race were 2.8% of the population.

There were 2,982 households, of which 24.5% had children under the age of 18 living with them, 40.1% were married couples living together, 8.5% had a female householder with no husband present, 3.8% had a male householder with no wife present, and 47.6% were non-families. 36.7% of all households were made up of individuals, and 11.4% had someone living alone who was 65 years of age or older. The average household size was 2.10, and the average family size was 2.77.

The median age in the city was 40.1 years. 19.6% of residents were under 18; 7.1% were between the ages of 18 and 24; 30.2% were from 25 to 44; 28.9% were from 45 to 64, and 14.3% were 65 years of age or older. The gender makeup of the city was 50.3% male and 49.7% female.

=== 2000 census ===
As of the census of 2000, there were 5,032 people, 2,229 households, and 1,203 families living in the city. The population density was 1,138.5 inhabitants per square mile (439.6/km^{2}). There were 2,652 housing units at an average density of 600.0 per square mile (231.7/km^{2}). The racial makeup of the city was 95.97% White, 0.14% African American, 1.11% Native American, 0.58% Asian, 0.06% Pacific Islander, 0.72% from other races, and 1.43% from two or more races. Hispanic or Latino of any race were 1.93% of the population.

There were 2,229 households, out of which 26.2% had children under the age of 18 living with them, 41.2% were married couples living together, 9.8% had a female householder with no male present, and 46.0% were non-families. 34.4% of all households were made up of individuals, and 10.9% had someone living alone who was 65 years of age or older. The average household size was 2.20, and the average family size was 2.86.

The population was spread out in the city, with 21.6% under 18, 8.6% from 18 to 24, 32.9% from 25 to 44, 22.5% from 45 to 64, and 14.4% 65. The median age was 37 years. For every 100 females, there were 92.4 males. For every 100 females age 18 and over, there were 91.7 males.

The median income for a household in the city was $33,038, and the median income for a family was $41,009. Males had a median income of $36,298 versus $19,583 for females. The per capita income for the city was $24,098. About 13.8% of families and 18.2% of the population were below the poverty line, including 32.9% of those under age 18 and 12.7% of those age 65 or over.

== Arts and culture ==
Whitefish is known for its environmentalism, with an extensive system of protected trails and forests designed to purify the town's water. It has been ranked one of the top places for skiing in the United States. The town has been labeled as a "model of resistance" against hate and racism.

=== Annual cultural events ===
Huckleberry Days Arts Festival is an annual arts festival featuring 100 artists and food vendors. The event includes a huckleberry dessert bake-off contest.

The Taste of Whitefish is an annual event that has been held for more than twenty-five years. The event features over twenty-five restaurants, caterers and beverage companies offering samples of their specialties.

The Whitefish Winter Carnival is an annual winter festival celebrating winter topics with a parade, "penguin plunge" into Whitefish Lake, and snow sculptures. It is held the first weekend in February each year.

Under the Big Sky Music Festival takes place annually in Whitefish. The festival explores the breadth and legacy of America, with both traditional and contemporary takes on America's rich musical traditions, across two stages in naturally formed amphitheaters on a local ranch.

The Whitefish Arts Festival (WAF) occurs over the 4th of July weekend and is a tradition going back over forty years. It is a favorite throughout the Northwest and maintains a long tradition of high-quality arts and fine crafts. Artists from across the country are represented in the WAF. Metal sculptures, paintings and photography, woodworking, pottery, jewelry, clothing, and home decorations are just some of the featured fine arts. All of the art is handmade.

The annual Whitefish Trail Hootenanny occurs in downtown Whitefish to celebrate and support the public land and trails that ring the town. It includes live music and local culinary specialties to raise funds to protect public land.

Every year Whitefish hosts a songwriter retreat called Nashville Heads West. This retreat brings Nashville-based songwriters to Whitefish to River Meadow Ranch for one week of writing songs with the added inspiration "of being under Montana's big sky."

== Sports ==
The Whitefish Trail Legacy Run is an annual ultra trail race to celebrate the unique public trail system. It includes a 50-kilometer (31-mile) ultra-marathon and a 1/2 marathon, a 10-kilometer, and a 5-kilometer (3.1-mile) race. It takes place in the first week of October in conjunction with the Oktoberfest celebration.

The World Indoor Golf Championship has been held in Whitefish for over sixteen years and is a 9-hole "miniature golf" tournament in downtown Whitefish.

The Glacier Challenge is a six-leg, multi-sport relay covering 50 miles (80 km) of Montana. The race features six legs of running, biking, canoeing, and kayaking covering almost 50 miles (80 km) in and around Whitefish. A triathlon has recently been added to include the first three legs of the Glacier Challenge. Participants enter as a solo team, partner duo, or group team. The 50 miles (80 km) race consists of an 8-mile (13 km) run, kayak, road bike, mountain bike, canoe, and 3.1-mile (5.0 km) run. There are also food vendors, activities for children, and music.

== Government and politics ==
Whitefish's government system consists of a city council with six council members and a mayor and city manager. As of July 2024, the mayor was John Muhlfeld and the city manager was Dana Smith.

== Education ==
The Whitefish School District serves Whitefish. Schools in the district include Muldown Elementary School, Whitefish Middle School. Whitefish High School and Whitefish Independent High School. Whitefish School District offers students K-12 a wide range of academic supplements, for example, online Virtual High School and dual credit opportunity through Flathead Valley Community College. Whitefish High School is known as the Bulldogs.

Whitefish High School is home to numerous state championship teams; the most recent is the girls' cross country team. They have won four consecutive titles. Other state athletic accomplishments have been made in football, girls' and boys' golf, volleyball, boys' and girls' basketball, boys' and girls' track and field, girls' softball, boys' and girls' tennis, speech, and debate.

Whitefish Community Library is a public library in the town.

== Media ==
Whitefish is part of the Missoula media market, which covers a seven-county area of northwestern Montana. The city's main newspaper is The Whitefish Pilot, while the Flathead Beacon, a regional newspaper for the Flathead Valley based in Kalispell, publishes Whitefish Area News. Three radio stations are licensed to Whitefish, all owned by Bee Broadcasting, Inc.: KJJR 880 AM, KHNK 1240 AM, and KWOL-FM 105.1.

== Infrastructure ==
=== Medical ===
The Logan Health Medical Center is the county's largest hospital with clinics and other facilities serving the area under Logan Health.

=== Transportation ===
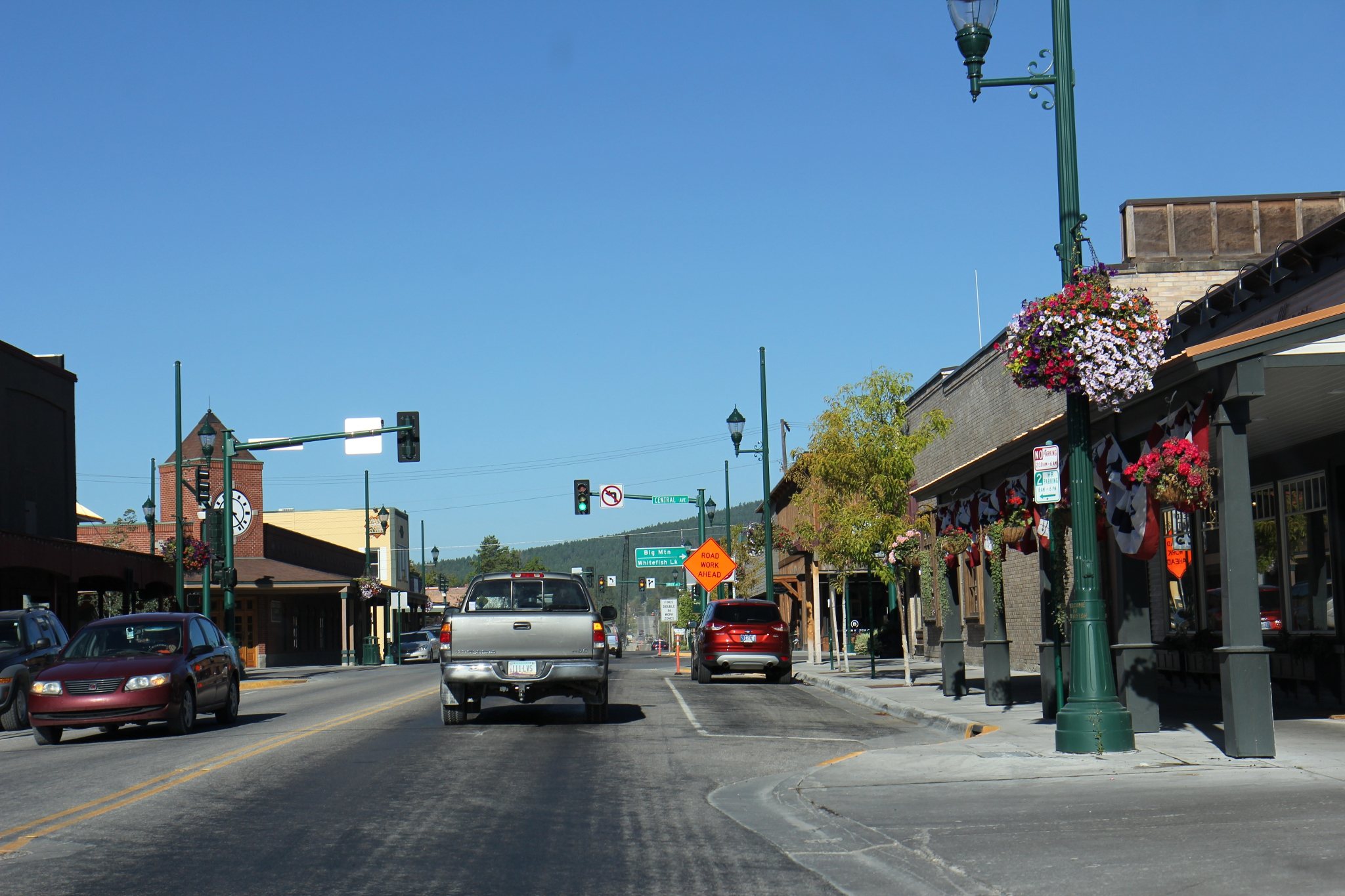
US 93 through Whitefish

U.S. Route 93 and MT 40 run through Whitefish. Commercial airline service is available at Glacier Park International Airport along U.S. Route 2.

The Whitefish Amtrak station is served by Amtrak's Chicago–Portland/Seattle Empire Builder, as well as intercity buses to Kalispell and Missoula. The station is Amtrak's busiest in Montana. The Whitefish Amtrak station is owned by Stumptown Historical Society and was listed on the National Register of Historic Places in 2002.

== Museums and other points of interest ==
- Alpine Theatre Project
- Great Northern Brewing Company
- Whitefish Museum, found in the classic depot building in the center of town
- Whitefish Theatre Company

== Notable people ==
- David Booth, professional hockey player, now lives in Whitefish, originally from Washington, Michigan
- Lyn Bennet, state legislator
- Bob Brown, Montana Secretary of State
- Murray Craven, former NHL player
- Adrianne Curry-Rhode, former model, first season winner of America's Next Top Model in 2003
- Edward J. DeBartolo Jr., former owner of the San Francisco 49ers
- Pat Donovan, former Dallas Cowboys offensive lineman, now lives in Whitefish
- Kaitlyn Farrington, professional snowboarder, 2014 gold-medal Women's Half Pipe
- David Graham, retired professional golfer
- Nicole Heavirland, U.S. rugby Olympian
- Steve Howe, former MLB pitcher
- Kyle Aaron Huff, mass murderer
- Dorothy M. Johnson, Western author
- Paula Koch, member of the Montana House of Representatives
- Gary Knopp, member of the Alaska House of Representatives
- Ross M. Lence, political scientist and author
- Braxton Mitchell, politician
- Frank B. Morrison, Jr., Montana Supreme Court justice
- John Morrison, Montana state auditor
- Terry Moulton, Wisconsin politician
- Jake Sanderson, professional hockey player
- Brian Schweitzer, Governor of Montana
- Richard B. Spencer, white supremacist
- Constance Towers, singer and actress
- Maggie Voisin, freestyle skier
- Ryan Zinke, U.S. representative, former United States Secretary of the Interior
