= Two-Way Mirror (book) =

Book by Fiona Sampson

- Hardcover edition
- Author: Fiona Sampson
- Language: English
- Subject: Elizabeth Barrett Browning
- Publisher: Profile Books
- Publication date: 18 February 2021
- Publication place: United Kingdom
- Pages: 336
- ISBN: 9781788162074

Two-Way Mirror: The Life of Elizabeth Barrett Browning is a 2021 book by British writer Fiona Sampson. The book examines the life of Victorian poet Elizabeth Barrett Browning, and is the first full biography of the poet in over 30 years. Sampson's analysis explores the personal life and political awakening of Barrett Browning.

Upon release, the book was met with a positive reception from critics, with praise towards Sampson's complex portrayal of Barrett Browning's life and voicing her importance as one of the leading Victorian poets.

== Background ==
According to Kathryn Hughes in her Guardian review, Two-Way Mirror explores Barrett Browning's "personal and political entanglements with empire and race". Incorporating recent archival discoveries, it portrays the poet as a daring Victorian sensation and dismisses her delicately "invalid" image. New Statesman described the biography as an insightful account that disregards the previous studies that overshadowed the poet in relation to her father or husband.

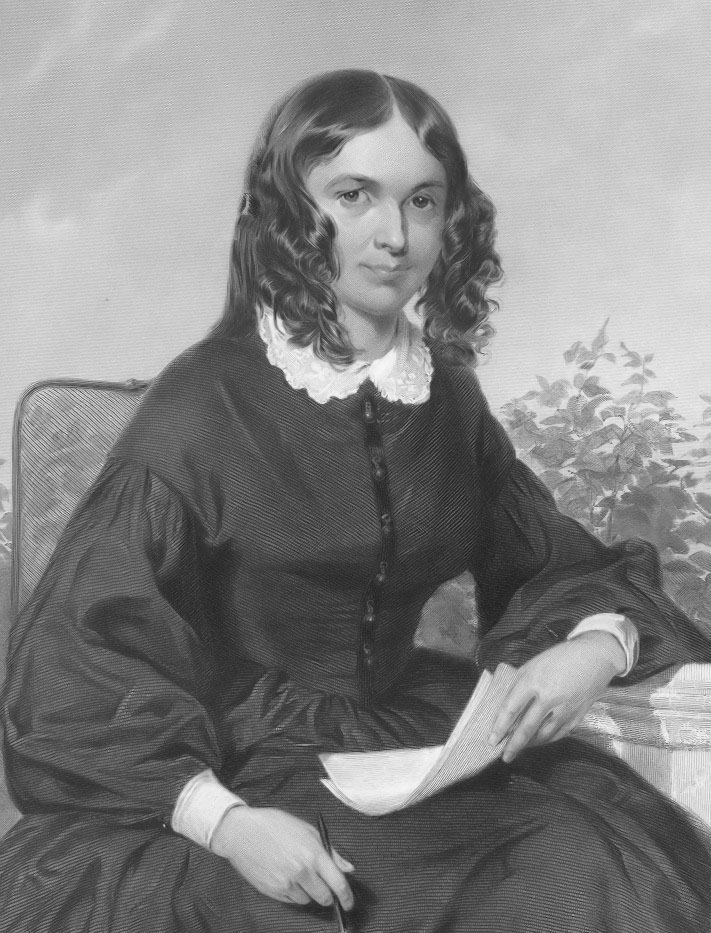
19th-century English poet Elizabeth Barrett Browning

Sampson's analysis uses the poet's 1856 epic poem Aurora Leigh as a reference to argue about her reputation in the literary canon. According to Hughes, Barrett Browning is represented as "publicly engaged" in the biography, in which Aurora Leigh provides the readers with "a map and model for how Barrett Browning forged a new relationship between female subjectivity and public utterance."

== Reception ==
The book received positive reviews from critics. English journalist Lucasta Miller gave the book four out of five stars in her review for The Daily Telegraph, saying that it "restores [Barrett Browning] to her proper place as one of the leading voices of the Victorian era". Miller further wrote that the book is "an empathetic- and much-needed reassessment which tells a fascinating story". She praised the use of present tense signalling "the sense that the biographer is her subject back to life". While referring to Two-Way Mirror as a "page-turner", The Irish Times's critic Martina Evans described the biography as "passionate and exacting" and wrote that it is a "surprisingly compact volume, a bristling lyrical sandwich of philosophy and action".

In his review for The Spectator, Robert Douglas Fairhurst lauded Sampson for "breath[ing] vigour into a poet generally represented as a delicate invalid without any inner life at all". Similarly, Brian Morton of The Herald raved about Sampson's portrayal of Barrett Browning's life as a "complex portrait, with its multiple frames and mirror effects". Writing for The Times, Daisy Goodwin commended the biography as "intriguing" and "timely" which makes "the convincing claim that [Barrett Browning] was the first female lyric poet" and shows the poet "put[ting] the work before the life, and that surely is the right way around." Literary Review's Claudia Fitzherbert praised Sampson for crafting an "absorbing study of [Barrett Browning]'s risk-taking and originality as a poet, covering ground missing from Margaret Forster's biography published in 1988."
