= Hugh Boyd =

Hugh Boyd may refer to:

- Hugh Boyd (footballer) (1886–1960), Australian rules footballer
- Hugh Boyd (writer) (1746–1794), Irish essayist
- Hugh Boyd (politician) (1765–1795), Irish politician
- Hugh Stuart Boyd (1781–1848), English Greek scholar

== See also ==
- Hugh Boyd Secondary School, Richmond, British Columbia, Canada
- Hugh Boyd Casey (1925–1952), United States Army officer
