= Elizabeth Barrett Browning: A Biography =

1988 book by Margaret Forster

- American edition
- Author: Margaret Forster
- Language: English
- Subject: Elizabeth Barrett Browning
- Genre: Biography
- Publisher: Chatto & Windus (UK); Doubleday (US)
- Publication date: 1988
- Publication place: United Kingdom
- Pages: 400 pp

Elizabeth Barrett Browning: A Biography by Margaret Forster, first published in 1988, is a biography of the English poet Elizabeth Barrett Browning, which won the Heinemann Award in 1989. Forster draws on newly discovered letters and papers that shed light on the poet's life before she met and eloped with Robert Browning, and rewrites the myth of the invalid poet guarded by an ogre-like father, to give a more-nuanced picture of an active, difficult woman who was complicit in her own virtual imprisonment. It remained the most-detailed published biography of the poet in 2003, and was one of the best known of Forster's biographies in 2016.

== Description ==
Elizabeth Barrett Browning is the first full biography of the poet to be published since Gardner Taplin's life of 1957, and reviews substantial material uncovered during the intervening thirty years, including letters, diaries, papers and juvenilia collected by Philip Kelley and others. Forster draws on the new material to expand on Barrett Browning's life before she met Robert Browning in 1845, at the age of almost forty. She stresses the importance of Barrett Browning's rural childhood at Hope End in Herefordshire, and discusses the nature of her mysterious childhood illness, demonstrating that no diagnosis was made at the time by the doctors attending her. She points out the central role that Barrett Browning's mother, Mary Barrett, played in guiding her daughter's education and earliest literary development. Forster is sympathetic towards Barrett Browning's father, Edward Barrett – who was frequently demonised for "imprisoning" his daughter in their London home on Wimpole Street – highlighting their positive relationship during her childhood. She emphasises the similarities in character between father and daughter, and the fact that Barrett Browning actively maintained their intimate relationship before the split over her wish to marry Browning. She asserts that Barrett Browning "created her own prison and it was one, moreover, in which she had wanted the warder on constant duty". She was also among the first to suggest that Barrett Browning's relationship in the early 1830s with the married scholar Hugh Stuart Boyd, who tutored her in Greek, might have had an element of romantic attraction on her side.

The second part of the book deals with the Brownings' marriage and life together in Italy. Forster documents a series of miscarriages that Barrett Browning experienced. The biography is also innovative in its investigation of Barrett Browning's relationships with her female servants, whom she underpaid and in some cases abandoned when they had difficulties. Forster particularly highlights her poor treatment of her maid Elizabeth Wilson when she became pregnant. Forster subsequently examined the relationship between Barrett Browning and Wilson from a fictional perspective in her novel Lady's Maid (1990).

== Reception and awards ==
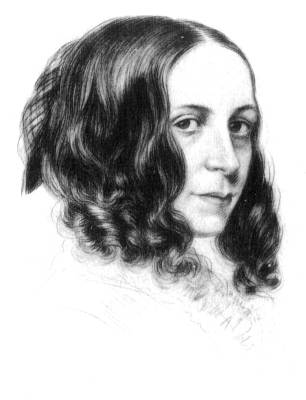
Elizabeth Barrett Browning as a young woman

The journalist Ruth Gorb, writing in The Guardian in 2016, describes the biography as "brilliant". Academics Simon Avery and Rebecca Stott consider the biography to interrogate the picture of Barrett Browning that was mainstream at the time of its publication, presenting "a far more active and intellectual woman than the myths had previously allowed for". The academic Deborah Byrd describes Forster's accounts of Barrett Browning's relationships with each of her parents as "illuminating", and praises her "for reminding us that the poet was as capable of creating complex fictions about her own life as she was of constructing interesting narratives about imaginary characters." The academic Deirdre David describes the book as "an exemplary biography, eminently readable and packed with fascinating detail", which takes a "fair-minded, never sensational approach", and praises the moving way that Forster handles the love story between the Brownings. The academic Glennis Stephenson considers that mainstream critical opinion had already moved away from the passive victim view of Barrett Browning's character that Forster challenges. She praises the book for its lively depiction of Barrett Browning's childhood and its insight into a "fussy, self-important" side of the poet. Byrd and Stephenson also praise the way the biography highlights how far Barrett Browning fell short of her own ideals of compassion and sisterhood in her treatment of her female servants.

Forster's biography has been criticised by some reviewers for neglecting Barrett Browning's poetry and her literary development. Stephenson writes that the biography contains "disappointingly little that is surprising", given all the new material Forster had to draw on. She also criticises its popular approach and its novelistic treatment of some events, its use of "Elizabeth" to refer to the subject, as well as a perceived lack of scholarly rigour.

The book won the Heinemann Award of the Royal Society of Literature in 1989.
