= Casa Guidi =

Writer's house museum in Florence, Italy

Coordinates: 43°45′55.11″N 11°14′52.73″E

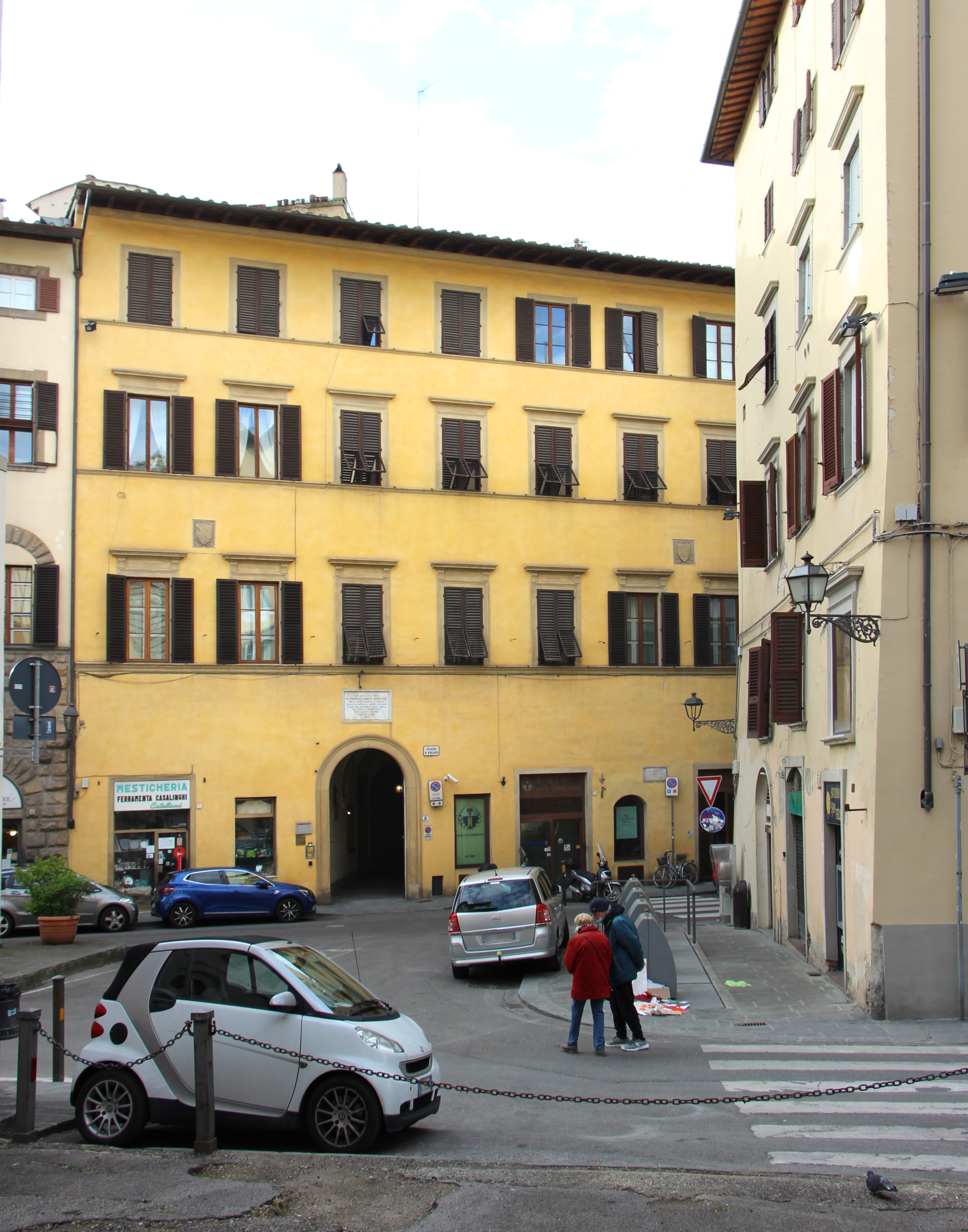
- Location: Piazza San Felice 8, Florence, Italy
- Website: The Landmark Trust – Holiday at Casa Guidi

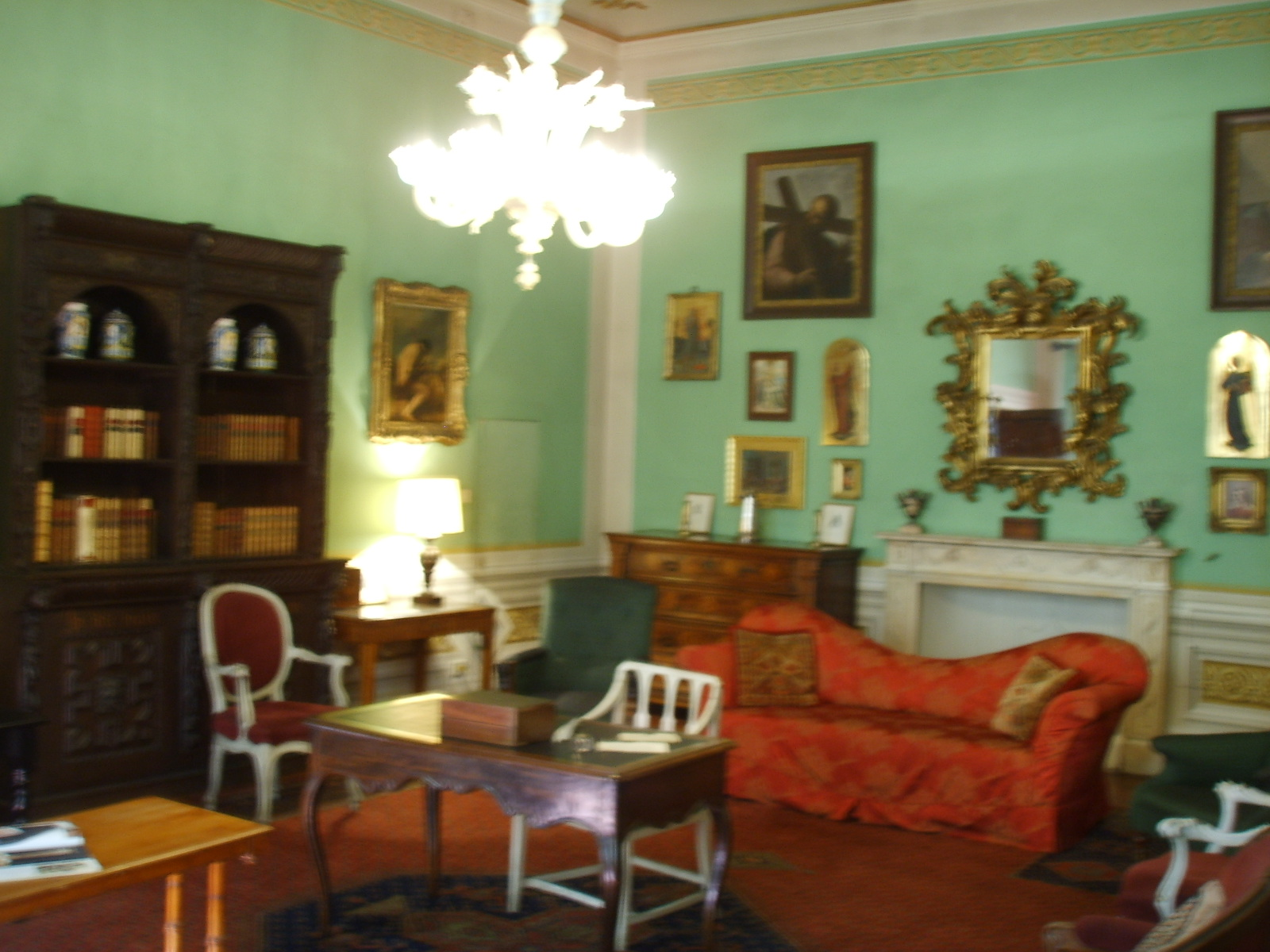
Casa Guidi Drawing Room

Casa Guidi is a writer's house museum in the 15th-century patrician house in Piazza San Felice, 8, near the south end of the Pitti Palace in Florence, Italy. The piano nobile apartment was inhabited by Robert and Elizabeth Barrett Browning between 1847 and Mrs. Browning's death in 1861. Their only child, Robert Barrett Browning (known as Pen), was born there in 1849.

Casa Guidi was the subject of her 1851 poem "Casa Guidi Windows".

== Overview ==
Originally called the Palazzo Guidi, the structure was built in the 15th century at what became the intersection of the Via Maggio and the Via Mazzetta.

After their marriage, the Brownings left England to escape family judgment about their pairing. They moved into the home on 20 July 1847 and stayed through the death of Elizabeth in 1861, though they moved out briefly between 19 October 1847 and 9 May 1848 due to disagreement about rent. The Brownings negotiated to rent their apartment on the piano nobile (second floor) for 25 guineas a year in exchange for the landlord removing the furniture he provided, and habitation included access to the nearby Boboli Gardens.

The couple used about £70 for furnishings, mostly from Elizabeth's recent royalty payments. Their purchases included two chests of drawers, eight sofas, three armchairs, and two large bookcases, including one that was a dark rococo style with carved angels and demons, which houses their book collections which were shipped from England. After settling here, Elizabeth wrote in a letter about their home, "In fact we have really done it magnificently... We have six beautiful rooms and a kitchen, three of them quite palace rooms and opening on a terrace".

During their first years in Florence, Italian states were organizing for political freedom. Elizabeth was moved by her neighbours' struggles and wrote the long political poem "Casa Guidi Windows" in response; the first part was written in 1848 and a second part added in 1850. The poem marked the beginning of a radicalization in Elizabeth throughout the 1850s, a result partly of her experience within the community of republican patriot artists and writers in Florence. The poem had a positive response in Italy, despite some censorship in Tuscany, especially in a review by James Montgomery Stuart calling it a poema stupenda, which Elizabeth noted was "lifting to the skies my 'politics and poetry'" in 1853.

The Browning household was a centre of British society in Florence although it was said that Theodosia Trollope's house was more care free. There was no animosity, however, and the Trollope's daughter played with the Browning's son Robert, known as Pen.

It was here that the couple befriended American transcendentalist Margaret Fuller, particularly the two women. Elizabeth wrote of Fuller that they spent "hours upon" hours together and that "I like her much", though she also admitted, "I disagree with her perhaps on every serious point—and have avoided two or three different subjects, in talking to her, because I felt there was a gulf betwixt us, even while our hands leant over to clasp". Another visitor in 1858 was American author Nathaniel Hawthorne after completing his job as Consul in Liverpool. He reflected on Elizabeth as being "of that quickly appreciative and responsible order of women, with whom I can talk more freely than with any men" and that "I like her very much — a great deal better than her poetry". Of Robert, he wrote he was "very efficient in keeping up conversation with everybody; he seemed to be in all parts of the room and in every group at the same moment; a most vivid and quick-thoughted person".

The Brownings briefly lived in Paris in the spring of 1851 and subleased Casa Guidi for a small profit during that time.

Elizabeth died in 1861 and the distraught widower Robert left Florence and never returned.

After Pen's death in 1912 the apartment was bought by several Browning enthusiasts. By that time, Casa Guidi was in poor shape, and the apartment retained hardly any furniture or paintings.

== Modern history ==
Plaque above the entrance to Casa Guidi honouring Elizabeth Barrett Browning

The Browning Society in New York City restored the home before giving it to Eton College, which undertook further work so that the building could be used as a study centre. Today, it is part of The Eton College Collections, but is administered by the Landmark Trust, who also look after the apartment above the one where John Keats died in Rome. When not being used by Eton boys, the property is available for holiday lets booked through the Landmark Trust.

Four of Casa Guidi's rooms have been restored to appear as they did during the Brownings' time there, while a modern kitchen and bathrooms have since been installed in former servants' quarters. A plaque outside the doorway of the building honors Elizabeth Barrett Browning for her poetry which "made a golden ring between Italy and England".

Casa Guidi is open to the public for 3:00–6:00 p.m. on Mondays, Wednesdays and Fridays from April to November. There is no admission fee, but donations are welcome.
