= John Kenyon (patron) =

English patron of Robert Browning

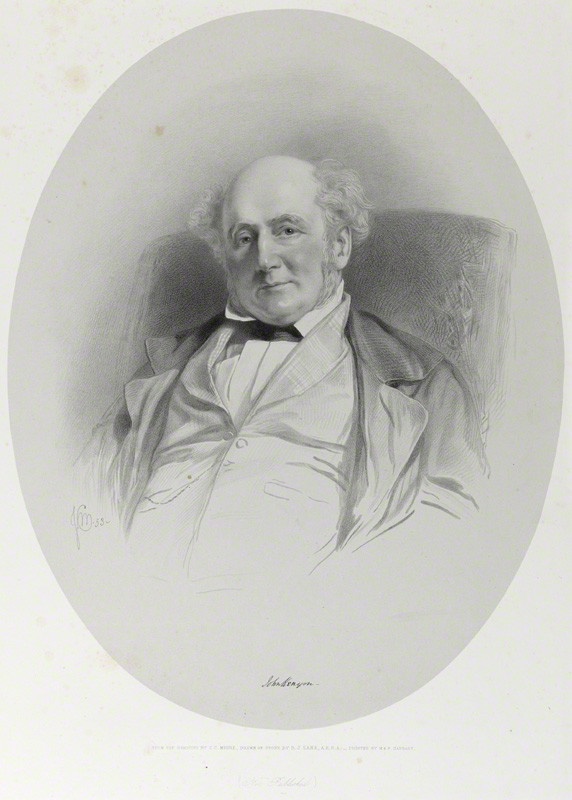
John Kenyon

John Kenyon (1784–1856) was an English verse-writer and philanthropist, now known as a patron of Robert Browning.

== Life ==
He was born in Trelawny Parish, Jamaica, where his father owned extensive sugar plantations; his mother was a daughter of John Simpson of Bounty Hall in the same parish, also a sugar planter. Both parents died while Kenyon was a boy at Fort Bristol School, Bristol. Thence he went for a time to Charterhouse School, and after some dabbling in experimental science at William Nicholson's Philosophical Institute, in London's Soho, went in 1802 to Peterhouse, Cambridge. He left Cambridge without a degree in 1808, married, and settled at Woodlands, between Alfoxden and Nether Stowey in Somerset.

Rich and unmotivated, Kenyon spent his life in society, as a "wealthy and generous dilettante", and a gastronome friend of Philip Courtenay the reputed epicure. He received money under the Slave Compensation Act 1837 for the Chester Estate, Trelawny Parish, Jamaica, inherited from his brother-in-law, and left £180,000 at his death. He died after a long illness at Cowes on 3 December 1856, and was buried in the vault belonging to his wife's family in Lewisham churchyard.

== Works ==
Kenyon published:

- A Rhymed Plea for Tolerance, London, 1833, dialogue in heroic couplets;
- Poems, for the most part occasional, London, 1838; and
- A Day at Tivoli, with other Verses, London, 1849.

== Associations ==
In Somerset, Kenyon made the acquaintance of Thomas Poole. Through Poole he encountered Samuel Taylor Coleridge, William Wordsworth, Robert Southey, and Charles Lamb. His life became an ever-widening circle of men of letters.

In Paris during 1817 Kenyon met George Ticknor, the historian of Spanish literature, who corresponded with him for years, and introduced to him many Americans. Among them were Bayard Taylor and James T. Fields.

Other friends of Kenyon about this period were Bryan Waller Procter, Augustus William Hare, Julius Charles Hare, and Henry Crabb Robinson. At Fiesole in 1830 he met Walter Savage Landor, who when in England was frequently his guest, and wrote part of Orestes at Delpho under his roof. Kenyon was one of Southey's travelling companions on his French tour in 1838.

== The Brownings ==
Meeting Browning at a dinner-party, Kenyon discovered that Robert Browning senior, his father, had been at school with him in Bristol; this was the beginning of a lifelong friendship. Kenyon first introduced Browning, at the house of her parents, to Elizabeth Barrett, a relative if not a close one, who became Browning's wife.

To Kenyon Browning dedicated his Dramatic Romances and Lyrics. Failing to obtain for Kenyon a copy of the picture Andrea del Sarto and his wife in the Pitti Palace, Browning wrote and sent to him from Florence the poem Andrea del Sarto. When the Brownings visited England, Kenyon's house was their home, and here in 1856 Elizabeth Browning finished Aurora Leigh, and dedicated it to Kenyon.

== Philanthropy ==
Among the first to profit by Kenyon's philanthropy were Coleridge's family. In later life he distributed money in a systematic manner through intermediaries, who investigated each case.

== Legacy ==
By his will Kenyon divided his property between friends and charities, the largest legacy of £10,000 being taken by Browning. There were 80 individual bequests to friends.

== Family ==
Kenyon married first in 1808, and was left a widower when his wife died in Naples in 1818. and in 1823 married Caroline, sister of John Curteis, a wealthy bachelor, whose residence, 39 Devonshire Place, he shared when in London. He had also a villa at Torquay, and others in later life at Wimbledon (Lime Cottage) and Cowes. His second wife died on 7 August 1835, and her brother on 27 April 1849, leaving Kenyon the bulk of his property.
