= Eton College Collections =

Collection of items kept by Eton College

Coordinates: 51.49187°N 0.60792°W

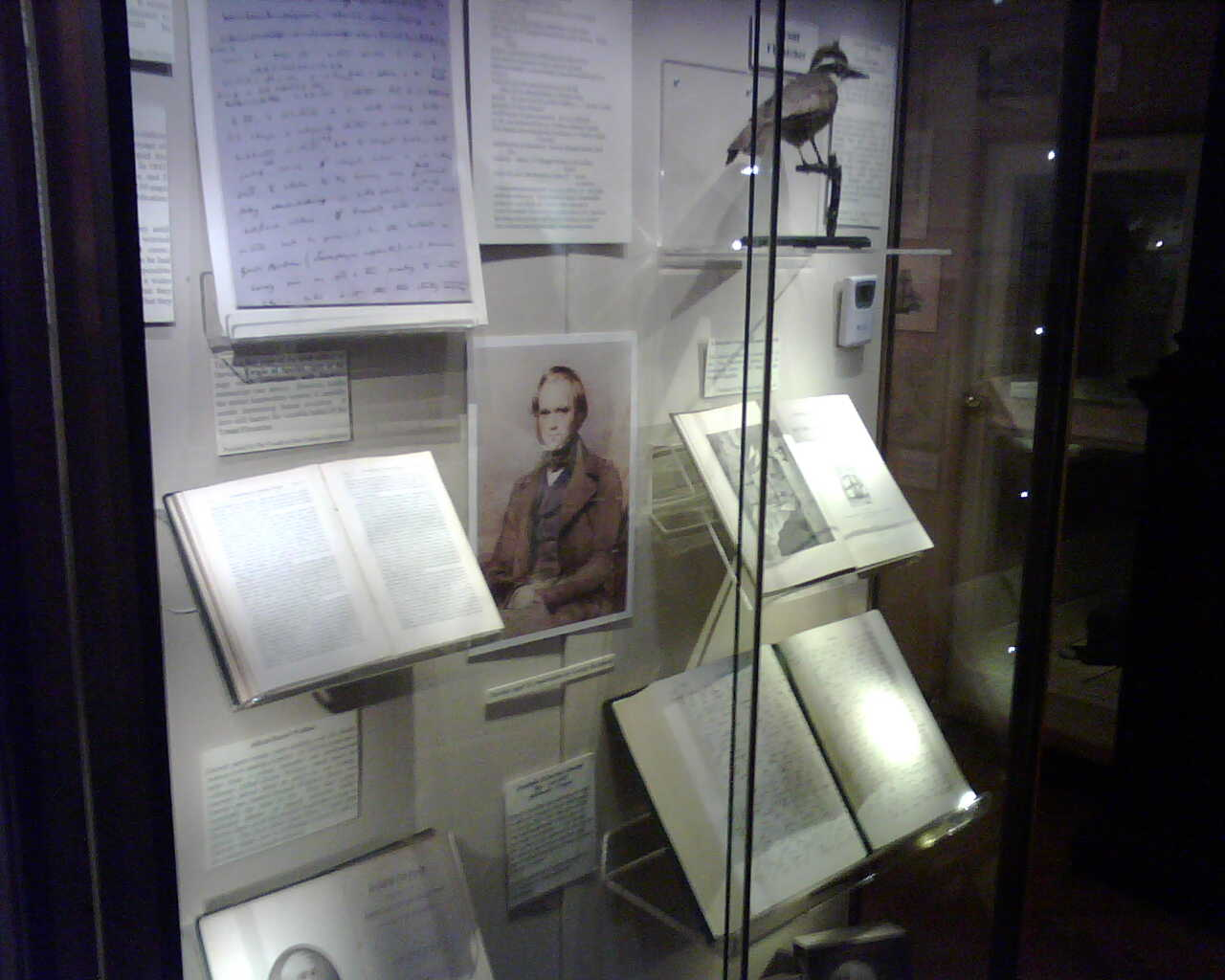
Part of the Darwin Section of the Eton College Natural History Museum.

The Eton College Collections are a collection of items of significant cultural or scientific value kept by Eton College in England. They include College Library, College Archives, Eton College Natural History Museum, Casa Guidi, Eton College Antiquities Collection and the Museum of Eton Life. The Collection also has hundreds of photographs, paintings, drawings and prints. Many items in the Collection are lent to exhibitions around the world.

== College Library ==
College Library is located in the cloisters of Eton College and is separate from School Library. College Library is open to members of the Eton community and to outside researchers (the latter by appointment only). It houses rare books and manuscripts of immense cultural value, including a Gutenberg Bible and pages from the manuscript of Darwin's Origin of Species. Facilities include: a readers' room for researchers, on-site and remote reference services, teaching support for the college, specialist group and school visits, regularly changing exhibitions and imaging services.

== College Archives ==
The College Archives contain many of Eton College's important documents made about it since it was founded. They also include a list of the boys who have attended Eton (although until the late nineteenth century, only the King's Scholars are listed).

== Fine & Decorative Art ==
The Fine & Decorative Art collection at Eton College dates back to the first century of the school's history. In this early period, the magnificent wall paintings were first painted within the interior of Eton College Chapel and a pair of benches, carved with the emblem of the Tudor rose and still in use today, were first constructed. The collection includes paintings, drawings, prints, sculpture, ceramics, furniture, stained glass and textiles. Particular strengths are the oil portraits, most of which are Leaving Portraits. These are painted by some of the most significant portraitists of the 18th and 19th centuries, including Sir Joshua Reynolds, Benjamin West and Sir Thomas Lawrence. There are 20th-century examples by Derek Hill and Andrew Festing. Also, the drawings and watercolours: the collection includes some 1,500 such works, depicting a wide variety of subjects and painted by some of the best-known artists in the medium, including Thomas Gainsborough, Thomas Girtin, J. M. W. Turner and Samuel Palmer.

== Eton College Natural History Museum ==
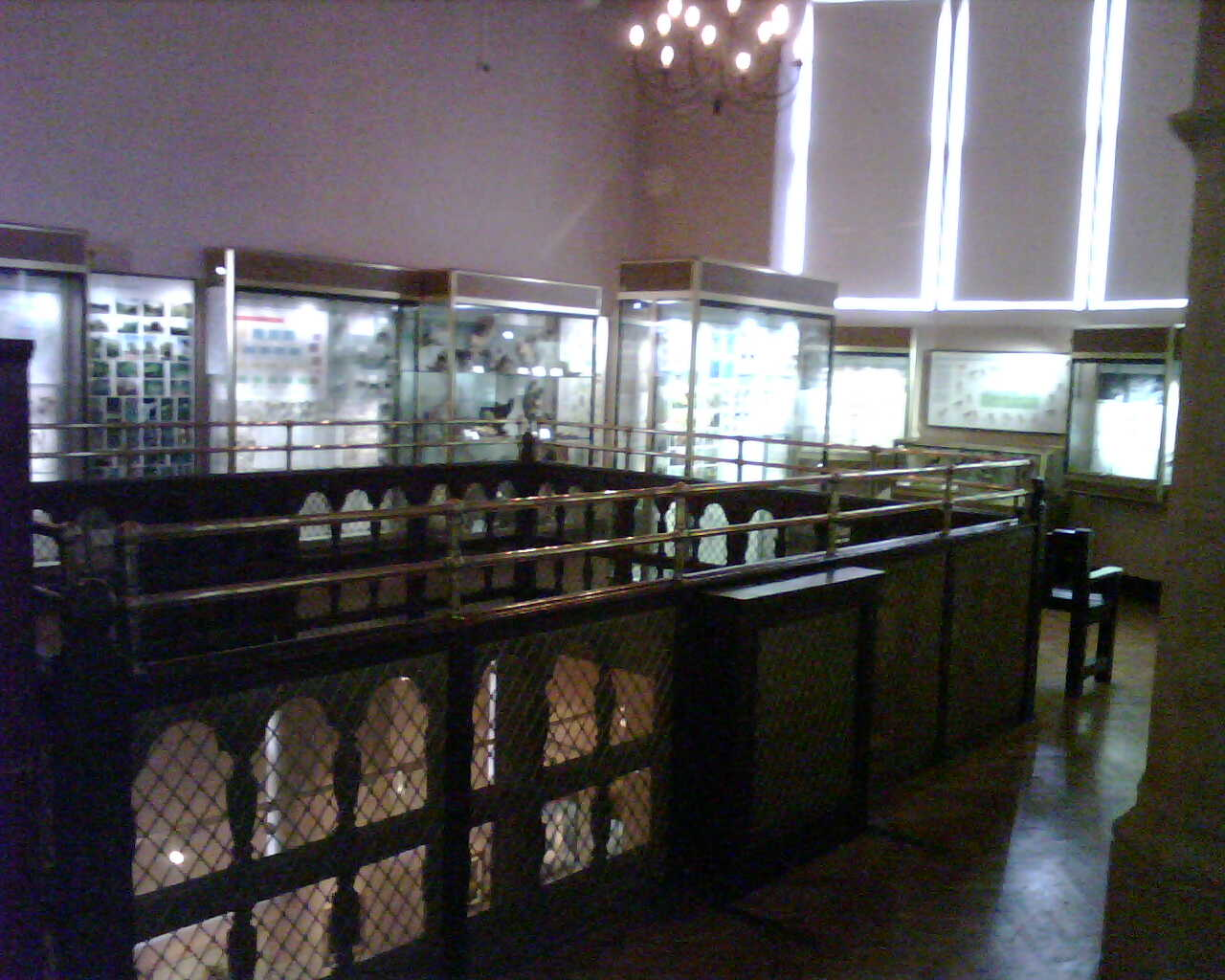
The first floor of the Eton College Natural History Museum.

The Eton College Natural History Museum is run by Eton College. It contains thousands of stuffed animals, plants, fossils and insects. Located at the archway into the Queens Quad, beside Lower Chapel it is open free of charge all year round.

== Museum of Eton Life ==
The Museum of Eton Life features artifacts and memorabilia about the history and traditions of Eton College and its students since the school's founding in 1440. Displays include famous Etonians, studies, games including the Eton Wall Game, punishment, uniforms and other customs. It was founded by a former housemaster, Peter Lawrence.

== Casa Guidi ==
Casa Guidi is a small house in Florence which was owned and inhabited by Robert and Elizabeth Barrett Browning.
