= Caitlin Davies =

English writer

- Born: 6 March 1964 (age 62); England
- Occupations: Writer, teacher
- Relatives: Margaret Forster (mother); Hunter Davies (father)

Caitlin Davies (born 6 March 1964) is an English author, historian, journalist and teacher. She has written several books about social history and women's history. Her historical works have focused on swimmers, female prisoners, female criminals, and female private investigators.

== Family and early life ==
Caitlin Davies was born on 6 March 1964, the daughter of Hunter Davies and Margaret Forster, both well-known writers. Hunter Davies wrote regularly about Caitlin and her brother Jake and sister Flora in a weekly Punch magazine column which ran in the 1970s, giving a broad insight into their upbringing. In her youth she was also frequently referred to by Auberon Waugh in his Private Eye diary, where he ran a persistent campaign to have her marry Prince Charles.

== Life in Botswana ==
Davies was associated with Botswana from 1990 when she met her husband, the former Botswana MP Ronald Ridge, while studying for a Master's degree in English at Clark University, Worcester, Massachusetts. Relocating to Botswana and working as a teacher, and then a freelance journalist, she wrote for Botswana's first tabloid newspaper The Voice and then as editor of The Okavango Newspaper. She was twice arrested as a journalist, once for "causing fear and alarm", and acquitted. In 2000, she received an award from the Media Institute of Southern Africa (MISA) "in recognition for consistent and outstanding journalistic work".

While living in Botswana, Davies wrote the novel Jamestown Blues and the historical work The Return of El Negro. The victim of a brutal assault and rape, she was active in research concerning domestic violence in Botswana. She was a founder member of Women Against Rape (WAR) in Maun.

== Return to England ==
Davies returned to England with her daughter after divorcing her husband and published a memoir about her experiences, called Place of Reeds (2005) . For several years she wrote education and careers features for The Independent. Davies is the author of six novels; Jamestown Blues (1996), Black Mulberries (2008), Friends Like Us (2009), The Ghost of Lily Painter (2011), Family Likeness (2013), and Daisy Belle: Swimming Champion of the World (2018).

Davies wrote an illustrated non-fiction book on the bathing ponds and lido on Hampstead Heath, Taking the Waters: a swim around Hampstead Heath, and a social history of Camden Lock (2013). Her work has appeared in The Sunday Times, The Daily Telegraph, The Mail on Sunday, Town and Country and Tate Etc.

In 2015, Davies' non-fiction book Downstream: a history and celebration of swimming the River Thames was published. It was described by The Independent as "a fascinating cultural history". It resulted in a three-week Thames swimming showcase at the Museum of London. Davies' non-fiction book, Bad Girls, is a history of Holloway Prison in north London, formerly the largest women's prison in Western Europe. It was longlisted for the Orwell Prize for Political Writing 2019.

Davies' book Queens of the Underworld: a journey into the lives of female crooks was published in October 2021. She received a grant from The Author's Foundation, administered by the Society of Authors, to research the book. Her latest book is Private Inquiries: The Secret History of Female Sleuths, published by The History Press in 2023.

From 2014 to 2017, Davies worked as a Royal Literary Fund Fellow at the University of Westminster. She worked as an RLF Fellow at the Victoria & Albert Museum and the Science Museum from 2019-2020. She is currently a Writing Fellow at Kent & Medway NHS and Social Care Partnership Trust.

== Bibliography ==
- Jamestown Blues. London; New York: Penguin, 1996.
- The Return of El Negro: the compelling story of Africa's unknown soldier. Penguin Books (South Africa), 2003. Thorold's Africana Books [distributor]
- Summer Magic. London: Bloomsbury, 2003. (short story contributor)
- Place of Reeds. London: Simon & Schuster, 2005.
- Black Mulberries. London: Pocket, 2008.
- Friends like us. London: Pocket, 2009.
- Grandparents. London: Ebury, 2009. (short story contributor)
- The Ghost of Lily Painter. London: Hutchinson, 2011. London : Windmill, 2012.
- Taking the Waters: a Swim around Hampstead Heath. London: Frances Lincoln, 2012.
- Camden Lock and the Market. London: Frances Lincoln, 2013
- Family Likeness. London: Hutchinson, 2013. London: Windmill, 2014, inspired in part by the life of Dido Elizabeth Belle.
- Downstream: a history and celebration of swimming the River Thames. London: Aurum, 2015.
- Bad Girls: a History of Rebels and Renegades. London: John Murray, March 2018.
- Daisy Belle: Swimming Champion of the World. London: Unbound, September 2018.
- Botswana Women Write. South Africa: University of KwaZulu-Natal Press, January 2020.
- Queens of the Underworld. London: The History Press, October 2021.
