= The Unknown Bridesmaid =

2013 novel by Margaret Forster

- First edition
- Author: Margaret Forster
- Language: English
- Publisher: Chatto & Windus
- Publication date: 2013
- Publication place: United Kingdom
- Pages: 240
- ISBN: 978-0-701-18805-4

The Unknown Bridesmaid is a 2013 novel by English novelist Margaret Forster published by Chatto & Windus.

== Plot introduction ==
Julia is now a child psychologist specialising in young girls with behaviour issues. The story alternates between her present job and her childhood from when she was an eight-years old bridesmaid. Julia was an only child and lives Lydia with mother in Cumbria, she was chosen to be the bridesmaid at her cousin Iris' wedding in Manchester. Iris's husband Reginald was a soldier and was then killed by the IRA in Northern Ireland when Iris was pregnant. Julia and her mother moved from Cumbria to Manchester to help Iris with her baby Reggie. Julia often looks after Reggie then she has a secret trip with him in his pram. From there her vindictive behaviour increases as she becomes a teenager...

== Reception ==
- Elizabeth Day in the Observer is praises it: "her latest novel is one of her best...Forster plants a seed of doubt in the reader's mind. It's a gripping read without being a thriller because we are drawn ineluctably into something darker that we sense is always floating just beneath the surface of what Julia chooses to tell us. Forster pulls this off with expert restraint, never allowing the story to pitch into melodrama and gently nudging us, page by page, into re-examining our own comfortable assumptions about reliable narrators."
- Penelope Lively from The Spectator has some misgivings: "Margaret Forster has a deft and idiosyncratic touch in this story of child psychologist Julia...she knows what it is to have been herself a child defined as difficult. So Julia's behaviour was not her fault? And her patients' behaviour is not theirs? I can imagine the kind of discussion that The Unknown Bridesmaid will provoke. But I don’t know where the author stands, which is to her credit...The imaginative structure and the energy of the story give it a greater distinction and make you entirely interested in Julia, even if you don’t much care for her, while her child patients are nicely varied, and for the most part persuasive, with just the occasional turn of phrase that sounds too adult for a nine- or ten-year-old.' Lively then concludes that 'A twist at the end shines new light on past events, but makes no difference to what had happened, and Julia remained, for me, sombre and distinctly humourless."
- Michelle Wildgen of The New York Times also has reservations: "Forster does a stunning job of shaping each layer of Julia’s psychological perspective into a dark, prismatic whole, but if there’s one disappointment in this book, it’s the abrupt ending. The novel has gathered such tension, and our experience of Julia is so intimate, that the closing passages seem poised to open one final door. But the conclusion fails to offer new insight. Then again, perhaps that’s Forster’s point, given how well she has explored her characters’ penchants for rationalization and self-deception. But a final reiteration of previous ideas isn’t enough to satisfy. That doesn’t prevent The Unknown Bridesmaid from being a mesmerizing, unsettling novel. What is the truth of Julia’s childhood within her tangled family, and what are its effects on her as an adult? Is it a success if a child becomes a respected professional instead of an outright criminal? The view from inside Julia’s head suggests otherwise."
- The Times reviewer Julie Myerson writes 'This is an odd - and oddly unsatisfying - novel which, though skilfully wrought and emotionally intelligent, is never quite as bitingly forceful as it seems to want to be'. Myerson concludes 'I found myself wishing that Forster would let go of the all-too-tempting didacticism and simply trust her readers. Her prose - at its best, admirably stark and edgy, honest and forthright - speaks for itself. We just don't need the psychological insights. And never more so in the novel's final paragraph when, having ended on a succinct note, and almost Victorian voice comes sweeping in and hammers the message home'
- Kirkus Reviews regards the Forster's narrative as being a patchwork, "in a sense weigh it down and limit its scope. The accomplished author reaches deep to explore hidden truths and raises issues about resolving past conflicts, but in contending with these topics, somewhat heavy-handedly, she doesn't cover much territory. Thin on plot, the book may be best regarded as a character study carrying lessons about facing one's past, righting one's wrongs and using one's experience to help others. That message alone may resonate with some readers. A carefully considered character study that digs deep to explore the ways the past can shade and shape the present."
