= Eton College Natural History Museum =

Museum in Eton College, Berkshire, England

Coordinates: 51.49187°N 0.60792°W

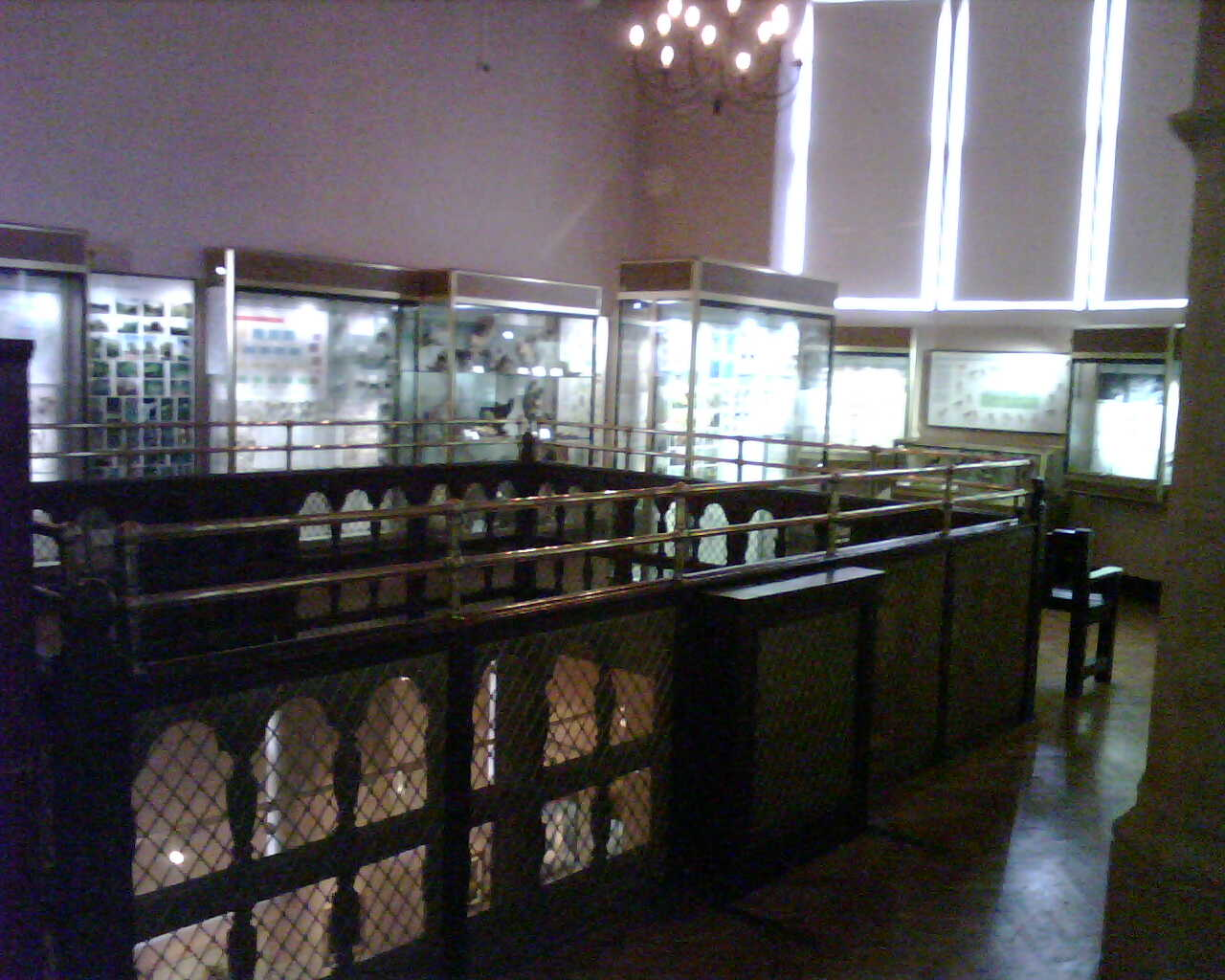
The first floor of the Eton College Natural History Museum.

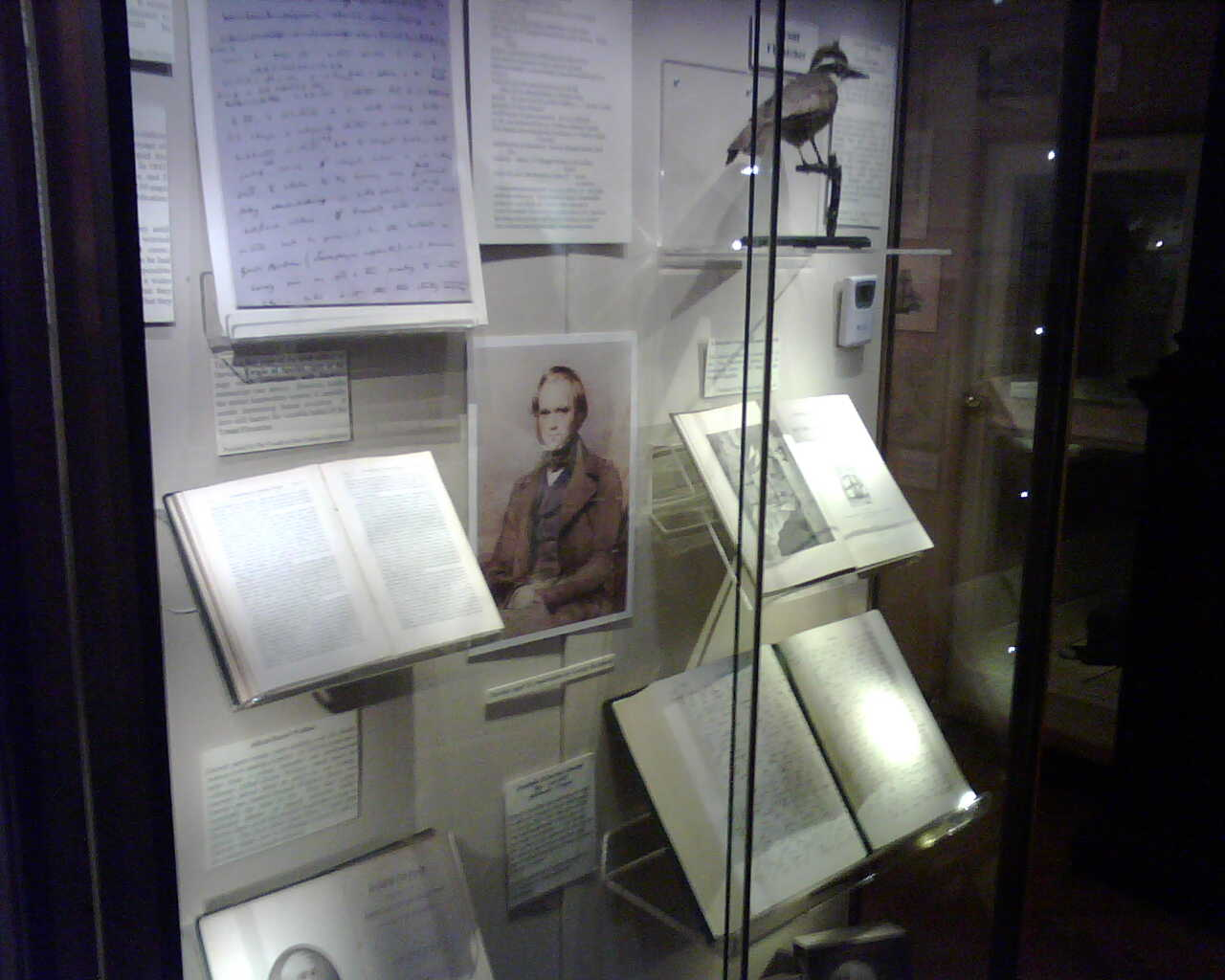
Part of the Darwin section of the museum.

The Eton College Natural History Museum is a museum of natural history that is part of Eton College, a public school at Eton, Berkshire near Windsor in England.

The museum contains many stuffed animals, plants, fossils and insects. It is located by the archway into the Queens Quad, beside Lower Chapel at the school. It is the only dedicated natural history museum in the county of Berkshire.

The museum opened in 1875 to house the Thackeray Collection of British Birds and other collections. It has been located at its current site since 1895. It houses over 16,000 specimens that have been donated since the 19th century. The 70+ displays date from 2000. The museum is used for teaching purposes, specifically for biology and geology. It is also open to the public and is visited by other schools and groups. The museum is open 1:30pm – 4:00pm on Sundays during term-time and it has free entrance.

== See also ==
- Eton College Collections
