= Shadow Baby =

1996 novel by Margaret Forster

- First edition
- Author: Margaret Forster
- Language: English
- Publisher: Chatto & Windus
- Publication date: 6 June 1996
- Publication place: United Kingdom
- Media type: Print
- Pages: 346
- ISBN: 0-7011-6564-2

Shadow Baby is a 1996 novel by British author Margaret Forster.

== Plot introduction ==
Evie was born in 1887 in Carlisle and brought up in a children's home by reluctant relatives, with her wild hair and unassuming ways, she seems a quiet, undemanding child. But is determined to find her mother.

Shona, born 1956 seventy years later, is headstrong and striking. She is born in Bergen, Norway and grows up in comfort and security in Scotland, the only child of doting parents. But there are, as she discovers, unanswered questions about her past.

== Reception ==
Christina Hardyment writes in The Independent and praises Margaret Forster as having "an extraordinary talent for handling an illuminating deeply sensitive issues of family life. Shadow Baby is a superbly constructed cross-cut tale of parallel lives Two girls are adopted as babies. Both search, when they are old enough, for the mothers who abandoned them. They find very different receptions - not just because of social changes but because of the characters and experiences of the "real" mothers they belatedly discover. Forster brilliantly conveys the contrasting times, both in attitudes to women and the options on offer for girls who find themselves pregnant outside wedlock. She also achieves a totally unexpected twist which knits together all the story's elements. The book's only weakness is the girls' absence of interest in their fathers."
