= Armstrong Browning Library & Museum =

Academic library at Baylor University in Waco, Texas, U.S.

Coordinates: 31°32′38″N 97°07′13″W

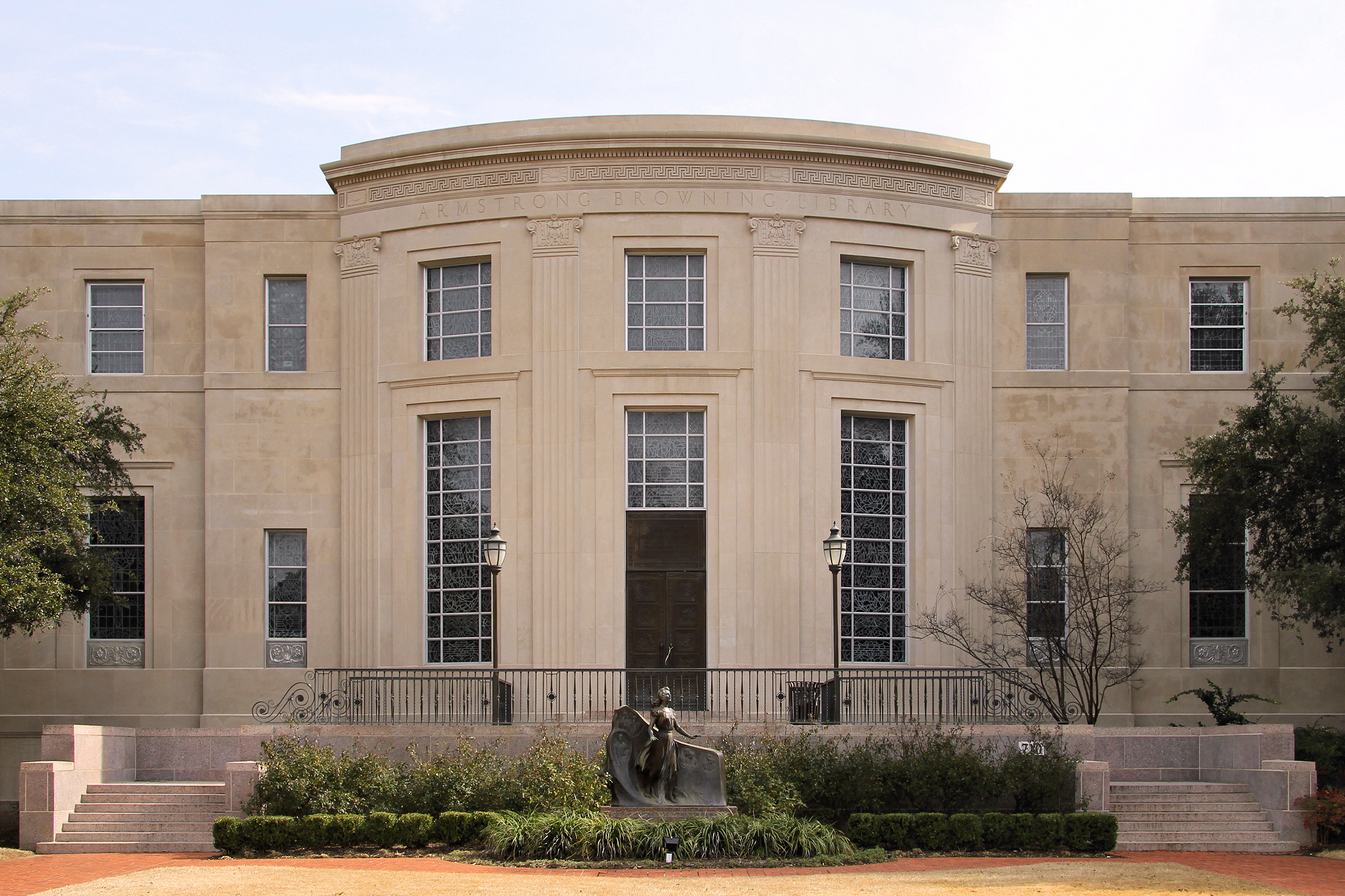
- Location: 8th Street and Speight Avenue; Waco, Texas, United States
- Type: Academic
- Established: 1918 (collection), 1951 (building)
- Branch of: Baylor University

Collection
- Items collected: World's largest collection of work by poets Robert Browning and Elizabeth Barrett Browning

Other information
- Website: www.baylor.edu/library

The Armstrong Browning Library & Museum, formerly known as the Armstrong Browning Library, is located on the campus of Baylor University in Waco, Texas, United States. It is the home of the largest collections of works by English poets Robert Browning and Elizabeth Barrett Browning. Additionally it is thought to house the largest collection of secular stained glass in the world.

== History ==
The original collection of Browning works were donated to Baylor in 1918 by Dr. A.J. Armstrong. After the death of the Browning's only son Robert Barrett Browning and subsequent sale of their collection, Dr. Armstrong obtained a list of the items sold and their purchasers, and attempted to acquire the memorabilia via donation or purchase.

Dr. Armstrong's collection was originally housed in the Carroll Library. The Carroll Library was heavily damaged in a 1922 fire; none of the Browning works were lost, and a special room was subsequently built to house them.

However, by 1925 the collection had outgrown the space. In 1943, Baylor President Pat Neff donated US$100,000 toward a new library. Construction on the library (which would also house the English department) began in 1948 and the finished structure (costing US$1.75 million) was dedicated in 1951. The building was significantly renovated in 1995 to house an even larger collection (by then the English department had relocated) and refurbished in 2012.
