= Robert Barrett Browning =

English painter

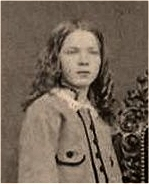
- "Pen" Browning as a boy
- Born: Robert Wiedeman Barrett Browning; 9 March 1849; Casa Guidi, Grand Duchy of Tuscany
- Died: 8 July 1912 (aged 63); Asolo, Kingdom of Italy
- Spouse: Fannie Coddington (m. 1887)
- Parents: Robert Browning; Elizabeth Barrett Browning

Robert Wiedeman Barrett Browning, known as Pen Browning, (9 March 1849 – 8 July 1912) was an English painter. His career was moderately successful, but he is better known as the son and heir of the celebrated English poets Robert Browning and Elizabeth Barrett Browning, of whose manuscripts and memorabilia he built up a substantial collection. He also bought and restored the Baroque palace Ca' Rezzonico in Venice.

== Childhood and education ==
Browning was the only child of the poets Robert Browning and Elizabeth Barrett Browning. The Brownings had lived in Italy for three years when their son was born at Casa Guidi in Florence. His mother, who had miscarried three earlier pregnancies, described him as "so fat and rosy and strong that almost I am sceptical of his being my child." His nickname Pen derived from his infant attempts to pronounce his given name Wiedeman (after his paternal grandmother's maiden name). As a cherished only child, he was, some felt, over-protected. Visiting the Brownings, the novelist Nathaniel Hawthorne wrote of Pen:

I never saw such a boy as this before; so slender, fragile, and spirit-like, – not as if he were actually in ill health, but as if he had little or nothing to do with human flesh and blood. His face is very pretty and most intelligent, and exceedingly like his mother's. He is nine years old, and seems at once less childlike and less manly than would befit that age. I should not quite like to be the father of such a boy, and should fear to stake so much interest and affection on him as he cannot fail to inspire. I wonder what is to become of him, – whether he will ever grow to be a man, – whether it is desirable that he should. His parents ought to turn their whole attention to making him robust and earthly, and to giving him a thicker scabbard to sheathe his spirit in.

Browning was educated "with anxious care" by his father and private tutors at the Brownings' home in Florence, and, after his mother died in 1861, in London. Robert was anxious that his son should attend a university, and sought the help of Benjamin Jowett, Master of Balliol College, the leading Oxford academic of the day. With Jowett's help, Pen's Greek and Latin were brought up to the requisite standard, but Jowett was obliged to tell the poet that his son's command of English left much to be desired. Because Balliol was too demanding for Pen, he went to Christ Church, Oxford, where he much enjoyed the sporting side of college life: he delighted in swimming, rowing, fencing, riding and boxing. He did not, however, take to academic study and left without taking a degree. Encouraged by Robert Browning's friend the painter John Everett Millais, Browning studied painting and sculpture in Antwerp and Paris. Among his teachers was Auguste Rodin; among his fellow-students was John Singer Sargent.

== Adulthood ==
1906 bust of Robert Browning by Pen Browning

As a painter, Browning was proficient, but his penchant for painting voluptuous female nudes did not encourage sales in Victorian England. Despite this, he achieved reasonable success, partly because of his father's continual efforts to promote his work. He exhibited at the Royal Academy, the Grosvenor Gallery, the Paris Salon and the Brussels Salon. The Times wrote that his works "showed considerable ability and force. Some of them are still well remembered…including busts of his father."

In October 1887, Browning married an American heiress, Fannie Coddington (1853–1935). They bought and restored Ca' Rezzonico, one of the great palaces on the Grand Canal in Venice. With no need to earn an income from painting, Browning continued to paint for pleasure for the rest of his life until failing eyesight finally prevented it. In October 1889, Robert Browning visited his son and daughter-in-law at Ca' Rezzonico. He wrote, "The Palazzo excites the wonder of everybody, so great is Pen's cleverness... There was a desecrated chapel, which he has restored in honour of his mother." During this stay, Robert became ill, and died there in December 1889. Browning and Fannie took care of Robert's dependents, including his sister Sarianna and old family servants, who came to live with them in Venice.

Browning and Fannie, who had no children, gradually drifted apart, although they never divorced. Their marriage was not helped by the rumoured relationship between Browning and a beautiful blonde Italian by the name of Ginevra, housekeeper at Ca' Rezzonico, who also modelled for Browning's paintings. Fannie eventually left him. They later made an attempt to revive their marriage, but it was short-lived. Browning sold Ca' Rezzonico in 1906 and thereafter divided his time between two other homes in Italy, the Torre all' Antella, near Florence, and Asolo, a location closely associated with his father, who set his poem "Pippa Passes" there and wrote his last book, Asolando, while living there. Browning grew old contentedly, despite failing eyesight. In May 1912, a street in Asolo was named Via Browning in honour of his father's centenary, and Browning, who was unwell, left his bed to attend the celebration. It was his last public appearance.

On 8 July 1912, he died of a heart attack at the age of 63. He was given a splendid funeral and was buried in Asolo, but ten years later Fannie had his body moved to Florence. Browning died intestate, and the collection of manuscripts and memorabilia of his parents that he had carefully built up over many years was auctioned and dispersed. Shortly thereafter, Dr A J Armstrong, a professor of English at Baylor University in the United States, obtained a listing of the items sold and the purchasers, and attempted to acquire the collection by donation or purchase. Armstrong's collection was the foundation for Baylor's Browning collection, now housed at the Armstrong Browning Library on the Baylor campus.
