= How to Measure a Cow =

2016 novel by Margaret Forster

- First edition
- Author: Margaret Forster
- Cover artist: Annie Griffiths/Getty Images; Ilina Simeonova/Arcangel Images
- Language: English
- Publisher: Chatto and Windus
- Publication date: 2016
- Publication place: United Kingdom
- Media type: Print
- Pages: 250
- ISBN: 1784740667

How to Measure a Cow is the last novel published by British author Margaret Forster who died in 2016.

== Plot introduction ==
Tara Fraser spent 11 years in prison then moved to Workington to escape from her violent past in London and changes her name to Sarah Scott. She befriends her neighbour Nancy Armstrong, a widow who keeps herself to herself, Nancy slowly makes friends with Sarah. Tara later makes contact with her three London school friends and tries to make up with them with mixed results...

== Reception ==
- Stevie Davies writes in The Guardian about Tara's character in How to Measure a Cow and reveals her "impetuous, self-willed energies, its vindictive capacity to lash out and stage a scene. She declares to the flabbergasted Nancy: “I’m full of lies, and I’m sorry.” Spying and revenging herself on her three middle-class London friends, Claire, Liz and Molly, Tara reverts to a version of her true self. I found the gossiping friends and their spouses rather an allegorical bunch, but we never fully grasp Tara's character. She remains at once vulnerable and predatory, even as, in its closing moments, the narrative sheds light on her unmothered childhood."
- Rebecca Abrams concludes in the Financial Times about Forster's How to Measure A Cow being "about the ordinary and extraordinary ways in which we disappoint ourselves and others, and our tremendous capacity to survive disappointment. A fine last novel by an outstanding writer, it will disappoint neither longstanding admirers nor newcomers to Forster’s work. Above all, it is a novel about the abiding human need to love and to be loved, a need that Forster makes clear is beyond measurement."
