= Have the Men Had Enough? =

1989 novel by Margaret Forster

Have The Men Had Enough?
- First edition
- Author: Margaret Forster
- Language: English
- Publisher: Chatto & Windus
- Publication date: 1989
- Publication place: England
- Media type: Print
- Pages: 256
- ISBN: 0-701134-00-3

Have The Men Had Enough? is a 1989 novel by English writer Margaret Forster about the dementia of octogenarian 'grandma', alternating between the perspectives of Jenny (daughter-in-law) and Hannah (granddaughter).

== Background ==
As described by Winifred Robinson on BBC Radio 4's You and Yours about Margaret Forster:

'dementia was only just beginning to register as a subject for public debate. Her vivid account of the once tough and self-relying grandma gradually falling apart as dementia takes hold was instantly recognised as so true to life that it was quickly being used as a teaching tool in universities and at nursing colleges. It's closely based on the experience of Margaret Forster's own family. It was Marion Davies, the mother of Margaret Forster's husband, Hunter Davies who had dementia. Margaret Forster began the novel three weeks after her mother-in-law died.'

== Characters ==
- Three children of Grandma:
  - Stuart, is a policeman and has the attitude that his mother should be in a home and he will have nothing to do with her care.
    - Paula is his wife and she has two young children, Alastair and Jamie
  - Bridget is forty-three years old, unmarried and a nurse and Grandma's primary carer. Fiercely independent herself, she's determined that her mother will not go into a home.
  - Charlie is a successful stockbroker and his money pays the rent of Grandma's flat and for the helpers who look after her.
    - Jenny is his wife and they have two children Adrian and Hannah (17)
- Carers: Susan, Lola, Mildred, Cynthia and Mary

== Plot ==
Grandma is deteriorating with dementia as Bridget and her carers struggle to cope with her. Jenny and Hannah try and help but Charlie and Stuart also have different viewpoints. Then Bridget has a holiday to Germany while Grandma's condition takes a turn for the worse...

== Reception ==
Anita Brookner from The Spectator writes that "Margaret Forster has written an extremely skilful and angry novel, and one which, although beautiful written, is not easy to read...The punishing narrative, which carries one helplessly and unwillingly, veers cleverly into fiction in the last couple of chapters...It is Margaret Forsters's contention that the women shoulder the burden, while the men write the cheques. Hence the satirical edge to the question that forms the title. One can only applaud the author's indignation, and hope that it will not go unnoticed and unrewarded."

Michael Irwin writing in the London Review of Books has some criticism that the novel "seems to provide a complete if depressing answer to such questions, but its comprehensiveness depends on the sympathy-shrivelling datum that the family are sufficiently well-heeled to be able to choose from the full spectrum of available possibilities, private as well as public. Charlie thinks nothing of shelling out £20,000 a year on his mother. Many a reader would envy his plight. What is admirable in the book nonetheless is the scrupulous exposition of a widespread and formidable problem that doesn't obviously lend itself to literary presentation. Aspect after aspect is considered: arthritis, bad feet, falls, clothes, incontinence, the arguments for and against euthanasia. There is a prevailing honesty that makes one trust the detailed accounts of the ‘homes’ that are visited. But to say so is virtually to admit that the book seems rooted in documentary rather than imaginative truth. There is a whiff of the notebook about much of the description."

Jonathan Coe writing in The Guardian says that "the novel sets out to investigate, with humour and anger the play of loyalties that such a situation sets in motion...The choice would have to be made because men and women it is argued, respond to the crises and deadlocks of family life in different ways. Forster is razor sharp when it comes to the part which gender plays in determining moral attitudes...If there was a prize for the most useful novel of the year, Margaret Forster would be a clear favourite; and since there are already the best and most entertaining, I sincerely hope she wins one."
