= Casa Guidi Windows =

1851 poem by Elizabeth Barrett Browning

"Casa Guidi Windows" is a long poem by English poet Elizabeth Barrett Browning, published in 1851.

Casa Guidi is a 15th-century house in Florence, Italy, where Barrett Browning and her husband, Robert Browning, rented an apartment from 1847 until her death in 1861.

George Eliot noted in her diary on 19 February 1862 that:

I have lately read again with great delight Mrs. Browning's Casa Guidi Windows. It contains amongst other admirable things a very noble expression of what I believe to be the true relation of the religious mind to the Past.

== Selected editions ==
- Browning, Elizabeth Barrett (1851). Casa Guidi Windows: A Poem. Chapman & Hall. 1st edition
- Browning, Elizabeth Barrett (1851). Casa Guidi Windows: A Poem. Cambridge: Cambridge University Press. ISBN 9781108060387. 2013 republication
