= Diary of an Ordinary Woman =

2003 novel by Margaret Forster

- First edition
- Author: Margaret Forster
- Language: English
- Genre: Novel
- Publisher: Chatto & Windus
- Publication date: 6 March 2003
- Publication place: United Kingdom
- Media type: Print (Hardback)
- Pages: 420 pp
- ISBN: 0-7011-7412-9
- OCLC: 51914252

Diary of an Ordinary Woman is a novel by Margaret Forster, framed as an "edited" diary of a fictional woman who lives through most of the major events of the 20th century, covering the years 1914 to 1995. So realistic that many readers believed it to be an authentic diary, it is one of Forster's best-known novels.

Martin Chilton, writing in The Daily Telegraph, describes it as an "intermittent record of a quiet life dominated by the fact, the threat and the fear of war" and considers its main theme to be the cost of war.

== Plot ==
From the age of thirteen, on the eve of the Great War, Millicent King keeps her journals in a series of exercise books. The diary records the dramas of everyday life in an ordinary English family touched by war, tragedy, and money troubles in the early decades of the century. She struggles to become a teacher, but wants more out of life. From bohemian literary London to Rome in the twenties, her story moves on to social work and the build-up to another war, in which she drives ambulances through the bombed streets of London. She has proposals of marriage and secret lovers, ambition and optimism, but then her life is turned upside down once more by wartime deaths.

== Reception ==
Helen Falconer writing in The Guardian concludes "Millicent never lived, this diary is an authentic record of how a century of English women were shaped - or, rather, distorted - by war. Anyone who cannot understand their mother or grandmother's generation can discover here what caused their emotional restraint, their passion for collecting short pieces of string, their chronic inability to cook, and above all their commitment to us, our families and our children's futures. This is fiction; yet this is true".
