= The Battle of Marathon (poem) =

Narrative poem by Elizabeth Barrett (1820)

The Battle of Marathon is a rhymed, dramatic, narrative poem by Elizabeth Barrett (later Browning). Written in 1820, when Barrett was aged 14, it retells the Battle of Marathon, during which the Athenians defeated a much larger invading force during the first Persian invasion of Greece.

When Darius the Great orders his immense army to march west to annex additional territories, no one in the Persian court predicted that some fractious, independent Greek city-states stood any chance against the Persian super-power. And yet at Marathon in 490 BC, Darius' plans received a decisive check in the brilliant Athenian offensive overseen by the aged but hardy Miltiades, who overran the Persian army just landed upon their coasts, cutting their opponents down to the last man.

Some of the Greeks' enemies are more than mortal; Aphrodite herself swears vengeance for the actions of their forebears in destroying her beloved Troy generations earlier.

The poem is written in heroic couplets; that is, in iambic pentameter rhymed AABBCCDD...
