= Margaret Forster =

English novelist and biographer (1938–2016)

- Born: 25 May 1938; Carlisle, England
- Died: 8 February 2016 (aged 77); London, England
- Occupations: Novelist; biographer; literary critic
- Spouse: Hunter Davies (m. 1960)
- Writing career
- Language: English
- Years active: 1961−2015
- Genre: Fiction

Margaret Forster (25 May 1938 – 8 February 2016) was an English novelist, biographer, memoirist, historian and critic, best known for the 1965 novel Georgy Girl, made into a successful film of the same name, which inspired a hit song by The Seekers. Other successes were a 2003 novel, Diary of an Ordinary Woman, biographies of Daphne du Maurier and Elizabeth Barrett Browning, and her memoirs Hidden Lives and Precious Lives.

== Early life and education ==
Forster was born in the Raffles council estate in Carlisle, England. Her father, Arthur Forster, was a mechanic or factory fitter, her mother, Lilian (née Hind), a housewife who had worked as a clerk or secretary before her marriage.

Forster attended Carlisle and County High School for Girls (1949–1956), a grammar school. She went on to win an open scholarship to study history at Somerville College, Oxford, graduating in 1960. Her first job was two years (1961–1963) of teaching English at Barnsbury Girls' School in Islington, north London. During that time she started to write, but her first draft novel was rejected.

== Writing ==
=== Novels ===
Forster's first published novel Dames' Delight, loosely based on her experiences at Oxford, launched her writing career in 1964. Her second, published the following year, was a bestseller: Georgy Girl describes the choices open to a young working-class woman in London in the Swinging Sixties. It was adapted as a successful 1966 film starring Lynn Redgrave as Georgy, with Charlotte Rampling, Alan Bates and James Mason, for which Forster co-wrote the screenplay with Peter Nichols. The book was also adapted as a short-lived Broadway musical, Georgy, in 1970.

Forster wrote prolifically in the 1960s and 1970s while bringing up three children, but later criticised many of her own early novels as "skittery", feeling she had not found a voice until her 1974 novel The Seduction of Mrs Pendlebury. Those early novels are mainly light and humorous, driven by a strong plot. An exception was The Travels of Maudie Tipstaff (1967), which presents the difference in values between generations in a Glaswegian family.

The theme of family relations became prominent in her later works. Mother, Can You Hear Me? (1979) and Private Papers (1986) are darker in tone. She tackled subjects such as single mothers and young offenders. Have the Men Had Enough? (1989) scours care of the elderly and the problem of Alzheimer's disease, inspired by her mother-in-law's decline and death from the disease. In 1991, she and her husband, Hunter Davies, contributed to a BBC2 First Sight episode "When Love Isn't Enough", telling Marion Davies's story; Forster sharply criticised government policies on care for the elderly.

The publisher Carmen Callil sees as Forster's best work Lady's Maid (1990), a historical novel about Elizabeth Barrett Browning viewed through the eyes of her maid. Diary of an Ordinary Woman (2003), narrated as the diary of a fictional woman who lives through the major events of the 20th century, is so realistic that many readers believed it was an authentic diary. Other later novels include The Memory Box (1999) and Is There Anything You Want? (2005). Her final novel, How to Measure a Cow, was published in March 2016.

Forster published over 25 novels. A lifelong feminist and socialist, most of her works address these themes. Callil ascribes to Forster a world view "shaped by her sense of her working-class origins: most of her stories were about women's lives." Author Valerie Grove places her novels as being about "women's lives and the deceit within families".

=== Biographies, memoirs and other non-fiction ===
Forster's non-fiction included 14 biographies, historical works and memoirs. Her best-known biographies are those of the novelist Daphne du Maurier (1993) and the poet Elizabeth Barrett Browning (1988). The former was a groundbreaking exploration of the author's sexuality and her association with Gertrude Lawrence, filmed by the BBC as Daphne in 2007. In her biography of Barrett Browning, Forster draws on recently found letters and papers that shed light on the poet's life before she met and eloped with Robert Browning, replacing the myth of an invalid poet guarded by an ogre-like father with a more nuanced picture of an active, difficult woman, complicit in her virtual imprisonment.

Forster also wrote fictionalised biographies of the novelist William Makepeace Thackeray (1978) and the artist Gwen John (2006). Significant Sisters (1984) chronicled the growing feminist movement through the lives of eight pioneering British and American women: Caroline Norton, Elizabeth Blackwell, Florence Nightingale, Emily Davies, Josephine Butler, Elizabeth Cady Stanton, Margaret Sanger and Emma Goldman. Good Wives (2001) surveyed contemporary and historical women married to famous men, including Mary Livingstone, Fanny Stevenson, Jennie Lee and herself. Her other historical writings include Rich Desserts and Captain's Thin (1997), an account of the Carr's biscuit factory in Carlisle.

Forster's two memoirs based on her family background, Hidden Lives: A Family Memoir (1995) and Precious Lives (1998) join an autobiographical My Life in Houses (2014). Hidden Lives, drawing on the life of her grandmother, a servant with a secret illegitimate daughter, was praised by the historian and critic Claire Tomalin as "a slice of history to be recalled whenever people lament the lovely world we have lost." Frances Osborne cites it as her own inspiration for becoming a biographer: "It opened my eyes to how riveting the history of real girl-next-door women could be." The sequel, Precious Lives, tackled Forster's father, whom she reportedly disliked.

== Broadcasting, journalism and other roles ==
Forster joined the BBC Advisory Committee on the Social Effects of Television (1975–1977) and the Arts Council Literary Panel (1978–1981). She served as a Booker Prize judge in 1980. She was the main non-fiction reviewer for the Evening Standard (1977–1980). She contributed often to literature programmes on television and BBC Radio 4, and to newspapers and magazines. She was interviewed by Sue Lawley for Radio 4's Desert Island Discs in 1994.

== Awards ==
Forster was elected a Fellow of the Royal Society of Literature in 1975. She gained several awards for non-fiction. Elizabeth Barrett Browning: A Biography won the Heinemann Award of the Royal Society of Literature (1988), Daphne du Maurier the Writers' Guild Award for Best Non-Fiction (1993) and the Fawcett Society Book Prize (1994). Rich Desserts and Captain's Thin: A Family and Their Times 1831–1931 won the Lex Prize of The Global Business Book Award (1998). Precious Lives won the J. R. Ackerley Prize for Autobiography (1999).

== Personal life ==
Forster met the writer, journalist and broadcaster Hunter Davies when they were both living in Carlisle as teenagers. They married in 1960, immediately after she had completed her finals. The marriage lasted until Forster's death.

They moved to London, where Davies had a job in journalism, at first living in rented accommodation in Hampstead, then buying and renovating a Victorian house in Boscastle Road, Dartmouth Park, north London, which remained their main home.

After the success of Georgy Girl in the mid-1960s, Forster bought a house for her mother. The couple had three children, a son and two daughters; Caitlin Davies is an author and journalist. The family lived for some time in the Algarve in Portugal, before returning to London. They also had homes in Caldbeck and Loweswater in the Lake District.

She led a somewhat reclusive life, often refusing to attend book signings and other publicity events. Her friends included Carlisle-born broadcaster Melvyn Bragg and playwright Dennis Potter. Forster contracted breast cancer in the 1970s and had two mastectomies. A further cancer diagnosis ensued in 2007. By 2014, the cancer had metastasized, and she died in February 2016, aged 77.

== Legacy ==
The British Library acquired the Margaret Forster Archive in March 2018, which consists of material relating to her works, professional and private correspondence, and personal papers. It includes manuscripts and typescript drafts of most of her published work, and some personal diaries.

== Selected works ==
Novels

- Dames' Delight (Jonathan Cape, 1964)
- The Bogeyman (Secker & Warburg, 1965)
- Georgy Girl (Secker & Warburg, 1965)
- The Travels of Maudie Tipstaff (Secker & Warburg, 1967)
- The Park (Secker & Warburg, 1968)
- Miss Owen-Owen is at Home (Secker & Warburg, 1969)
- Fenella Phizackerley (Secker & Warburg, 1970)
- Mr Bone's Retreat (Secker & Warburg, 1971)
- The Seduction of Mrs Pendlebury (Secker & Warburg, 1974)
- Mother Can You Hear Me? (Secker & Warburg, 1979)
- The Bride of Lowther Fell: a Romance (Secker & Warburg, 1980)
- Marital Rites (Secker & Warburg, 1981)
- Private Papers (Chatto & Windus, 1986)
- Have the Men Had Enough? (Chatto & Windus, 1989)
- Lady's Maid (Chatto & Windus, 1990)
- The Battle for Christabel (Chatto & Windus, 1991)
- Mother's Boys (Chatto & Windus, 1994)
- Shadow Baby (Chatto & Windus, 1996)
- The Memory Box (Chatto & Windus, 1999)
- Diary of an Ordinary Woman 1914–1995 (Chatto & Windus, 2003)
- Is There Anything You Want? (Chatto & Windus, 2005)
- Keeping the World Away (Chatto & Windus, 2006)
- Over (Chatto & Windus, 2007)
- Isa and May (Chatto & Windus, 2010)
- The Unknown Bridesmaid (Chatto & Windus, 2013)
- How to Measure a Cow (Chatto & Windus, 2016)

Biography and history

- The Rash Adventurer: The Rise and Fall of Charles Edward Stuart (Secker & Warburg, 1973)
- Memoirs of a Victorian Gentleman: William Makepeace Thackeray (Secker & Warburg, 1978)
- Significant Sisters: The Grassroots of Active Feminism 1839–1939 (Secker & Warburg, 1984)
- Elizabeth Barrett Browning: A Biography (Chatto & Windus, 1988)
- Daphne du Maurier (Chatto & Windus, 1993)
- Rich Desserts and Captain's Thin: A Family and Their Times 1831–1931 (Chatto & Windus, 1997)
- Good Wives?: Mary, Fanny, Jennie & Me 1845–2001 (Chatto & Windus, 2001)
- Keeping the World Away (Chatto & Windus, 2006)

Family memoirs and autobiography

- Hidden Lives: A Family Memoir (Viking, 1995)
- Precious Lives (Chatto & Windus, 1998)
- My Life in Houses (Chatto & Windus, 2014)
- Diary of an Ordinary Schoolgirl (Chatto & Windus, 2017)

Literary editions

- Drawn from Life: The Journalism of William Makepeace Thackeray (editor) (Folio Society, 1984)
- Elizabeth Barrett Browning, Selected Poems (editor) (Chatto & Windus, 1988)
- Virginia Woolf, Flush: A Biography (1933) New intro. by Margaret Forster (Hogarth Press, 1991)
