= Hugh Stuart Boyd =

Hugh Stuart Boyd (1781–1848), was an English scholar of Greek, who taught Elizabeth Barrett Browning.

== Life ==
Boyd was born at Edgware. Before his birth his father, Hugh McAuley, took his wife's family name of Boyd. She was the daughter of Hugh Boyd of Ballycastle, Ireland, one of the supposed authors of the Letters of Junius. His mother's maiden name was Murphy.

Boyd was admitted a pensioner of Pembroke Hall, Cambridge, on 24 July 1799, and matriculated on 17 December of the following year. He left the university without taking a degree. He was able to live on the income from his Irish estates. He had a good memory, and once made a curious calculation that he could repeat 3,280 'lines' of Greek prose and 4,770 lines of Greek verse. In 1833 he appears to have spent some time at Bath. During the last twenty years of his life he was blind. While blind he taught Greek to Elizabeth Barrett Browning, who was very attached to him. One of her poems, the "Wine of Cyprus", is dedicated to Boyd. She also wrote a sonnet on his blindness and another on his death.

In 1805 he married Ann Lowry, daughter of the engraver Wilson Lowry. They had one daughter, Ann Henrietta, who married Henry Hayes. Boyd lived chiefly at Hampstead, and died at Kentish Town on 10 May 1848.

== Works ==
His published works are:

- Luceria, a Tragedy, 1806.
- Select Passages from the Works of St. Chrysostom, St. Gregory Nazianzen, &c., translated 1810.
- Select Poems of Synesius, translated with original poems, 1814.
- Thoughts on the Atoning Sacrifice 1817.
- Agamemnon of Æschylus translated, 1823.
- An Essay on the Greek Article, included in Clarke's Commentary on the Epistle to the Ephesians second edition, 1835.
- The Catholic Faith a sermon of St. Basil, translated, 1825.
- Thoughts on an illustrious Exile 1825.
- 'Tributes to the Dead translation from St. Gregory Nazianzen, 1826.
- A Malvern Tale, and other Poems 1827.
- The Fathers not Papists, with Select Passages and Tributes to the Dead 1834.

== Sources ==
This article incorporates text from a publication now in the public domain: "Boyd, Hugh Stuart". Dictionary of National Biography. London: Smith, Elder & Co. 1885–1900.
