= Aurora Leigh =

1856 epic poem by Elizabeth Barrett Browning

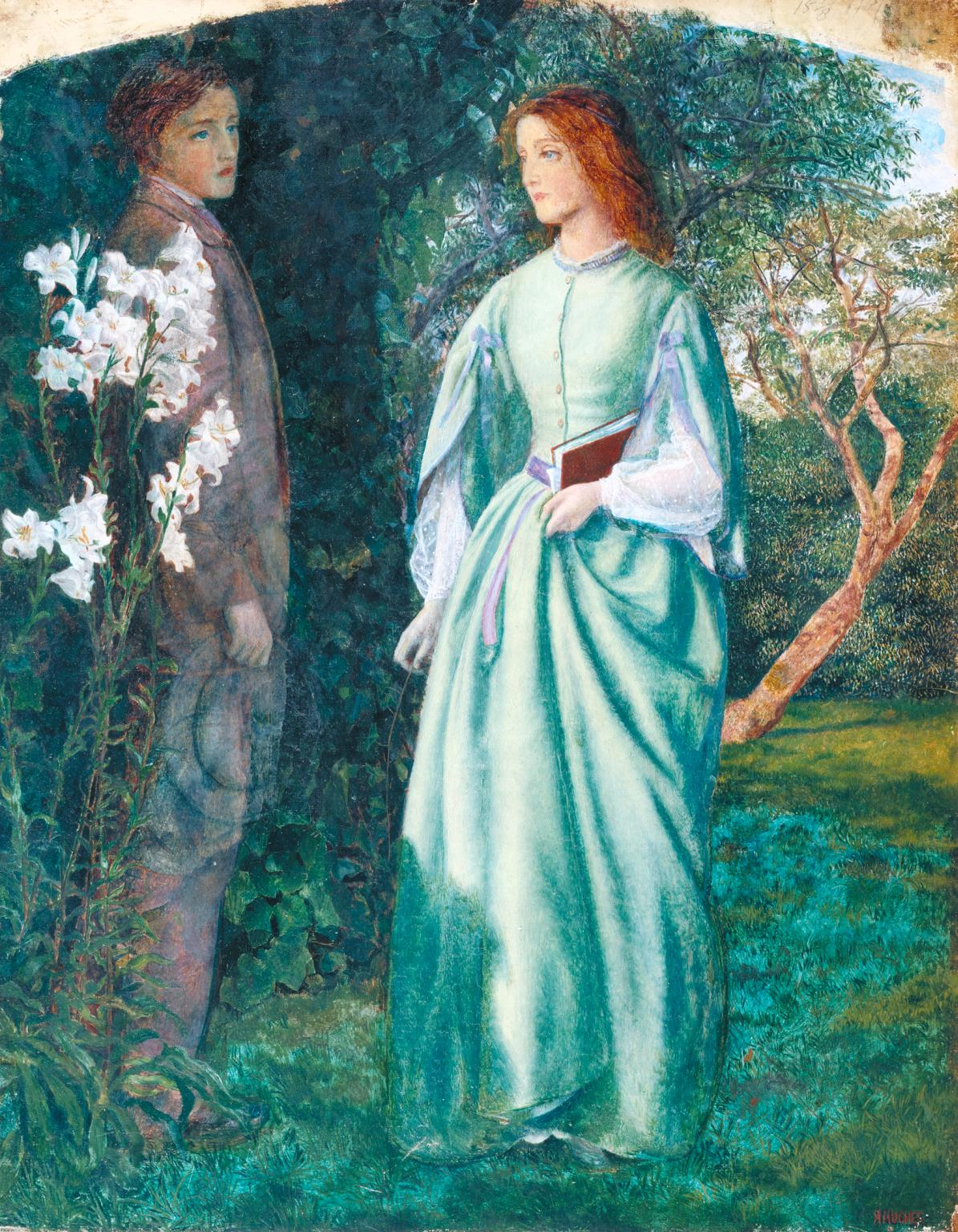
Aurora Leigh's Dismissal of Romney ("The Tryst") by Arthur Hughes (circa 1860)

Aurora Leigh is an 1856 verse novel by Elizabeth Barrett Browning. The poem is written in blank verse and encompasses nine books (the woman's number, the number of the Sibylline Books). It is a first-person narration, from the point of view of Aurora; its other heroine, Marian Erle, is an abused self-taught child of itinerant parents. The poem is set in Florence, Malvern, London and Paris. The work references Biblical and classical history and mythology, as well as modern novels, such as Corinne ou l'Italie by Anne Louise Germaine de Staël and the novels of George Sand. In Books 1–5, Aurora narrates her past, from her childhood to the age of about 27; in Books 6–9, the narrative has caught up with her, and she reports events in diary form. The author styled the poem "a novel in verse", and referred to it as "the most mature of my works, and the one into which my highest convictions upon Life and Art have entered". The scholar Deirdre David asserts that Barrett Browning's work in Aurora Leigh renders her "a major figure in any consideration of the nineteenth-century woman writer and of Victorian poetry in general". John Ruskin called it the greatest long poem of the nineteenth century.

== Plot summary ==
=== First Book ===
Aurora describes her childhood in Florence, growing up as the daughter of a Tuscan mother and an English father. Her mother died when she was four, leaving her father to raise her. He was a scholar and imparted to her knowledge of Greek and Latin and a love of learning. Her father died when she was thirteen, and she was sent to England to live with his sister, her aunt, in Leigh Hall, her family's ancestral home. Her aunt tried to educate her in what she considered a ladylike manner, but Aurora discovered her father's old library and read scholarly books on her own.

She read many of Shakespeare's famous works and fell in love with his writing style, and aspired to be a great writer like him one day in her life.

=== Second Book ===
This book starts on Aurora's twentieth birthday. Her cousin, Romney Leigh, proposes marriage to her. He is skeptical about her poetic ability, telling her that women do not have the passion, intellectual capacity, or redemptive qualities to be true artists. Because of this, and because she feels that he is too wrapped up in his social work and ideals to be a good husband, she angrily rejects him. Aurora's aunt chastises her for refusing him, telling her that because he is the male heir, he will inherit all of the estate and Aurora will be left with nothing. Shortly afterwards, her aunt dies. Romney attempts to give Aurora money, but she refuses it, deciding to go to London to make her living as a poet.

=== Third Book ===
This book opens in Aurora's London apartment. She has been writing small popular poems for magazines, which have earned her an enthusiastic following among romantic young men and women, but she is dissatisfied. The great works of art of which she felt she was capable have arrived stillborn – she has the inspiration, but somehow cannot get it onto the page. While she works, frustrated, a visitor arrives for her, a Lady Waldemar. She is beautiful but sharp and sarcastic, and Aurora does not like her. Lady Waldemar explains to Aurora that she is in love with Romney, so much so that she lowers herself to do charity work with him, but Romney has decided to marry instead one of his lower-class "projects", Marian Erle (whose name is a pun). She wants Aurora to speak to Marian and then to Romney and convince them of their foolishness. Aurora, partly out of curiosity and partly concern for Romney, goes to visit Marian and hears her life story: Marian's drunken mother tried to sell her into prostitution, and to escape it she ran away and became ill, eventually being taken into a poor hospital. There Romney found her and assisted her in getting work as a seamstress.

=== Fourth Book ===
Marian continues her story, relating how Romney continued to aid her and ultimately proposed marriage to her. Aurora asks her if she is sure he truly loves her, to which Marian replies that Romney loves everything. She assures Aurora that despite her lower-class status, she will be a loving and devoted wife to him. Before Aurora can answer, Romney enters Marian's room. He and Aurora awkwardly trade words, and she tells him she approves of Marian. He walks her home, and during their conversation she becomes confused about her own feelings for him. A month passes, and it is time for Romney and Marian's wedding – but Marian sends a letter in her place to the ceremony, telling Romney that she is not good enough for him. The crowd at the wedding assume that Romney has seduced and abandoned her, and attack him. Romney is devastated, and searches for Marian for days, but cannot find her. He and Aurora have a conversation about their respective disappointments with their missions; Romney can neither make a dent in the poverty he sees all around him nor gain the respect of the people he tries to help, while Aurora still has not succeeded in writing a real work of Art.

=== Fifth Book ===
Aurora discusses her further attempts to write. She tells how she is determined not to be constricted by her woman's role but is doubtful that the modern age presents opportunities for epic poetry, writing, "Ay, but every age / Appears to souls who live in't (ask Carlyle) / Most unheroic". As the book continues, she grows more and more desperate, crying out to her muses and gods for inspiration. She confides that she has not seen Romney Leigh for almost two years, but she has heard that he has turned Leigh Hall into a refuge for the poor. At a stifling, insipid evening party at one of her well-born friend's houses, she learns that Romney is engaged to marry Lady Waldemar, and bitterly reflects that "He loved not Marian, more than once he loved/Aurora." She decides that to find inspiration, she must travel to Italy, her mother's land, and in order to get the money sells some of her father's old books, as well as her own unfinished manuscript.

=== Sixth Book ===
This book begins with Aurora in France, presumably on a stop-over on the way to Italy. She wanders Paris with her head in the clouds, enjoying the atmosphere of history and the beauty that surrounds her. Suddenly, she catches a glimpse of a familiar face – it is Marian Erle. Frantically, Aurora follows her, losing her in the crowd eventually, but not before seeing that Marian is carrying a child. She is shocked, but resolves not to judge her harshly and tries for a week to find her, finally running into her by chance at a flower market. Marian takes her to her poor room, where she shows Aurora her baby boy. Aurora reproaches Marian for being promiscuous, but Marian angrily replies that far from it, she was attacked and raped and left pregnant. She explains to Aurora that Lady Waldemar convinced her that Romney did not truly love her, and sent her to France with her lady's maid. The lady's maid left her in a brothel, where she was raped and almost driven insane, but she managed to escape.

=== Seventh Book ===
Marian continues to tell Aurora her story: she was taken in by a kind lady as a maid, but was summarily fired when her pregnancy became apparent. Despite this, she could not bring herself to be unhappy: she was overjoyed that out of her dreadful experience, she could have the wonderful experience of motherhood. Aurora, after hearing Marian's story, apologizes profusely to her for misjudging her and offers her a "marriage" of sorts – she will protect Marian and her son and take them to Italy with her. Marian gratefully accepts. Aurora decides not to inform Romney that she has found Marian, but writes an angry letter to Lady Waldemar, telling her she knows of her disgraceful conduct towards Marian. Marian's presence, however, constantly brings Romney to Aurora's thoughts. She is surprised when a friend writes to her to congratulate her on her book – the manuscript she sold to get to Italy. She decides that perhaps it was better than she thought. She finds no particular inspiration in Italy, however, finding instead constant bittersweet memories of her childhood.

=== Eighth Book ===
Several years have passed. Aurora, Marian, and the boy are living in a villa in Florence. Suddenly, Romney Leigh arrives, having discovered their whereabouts through a friend of Aurora's. Aurora, believing him to be married to Lady Waldemar, is cold with him. He tells her that he has read her book and believes it to be good and true Art, and tells her that he has reconsidered the judgmental strictures he passed on her previously. He relates to her the story of his failed attempts at social reform: after he converted Leigh Hall into a refuge, stories went around the village that it was a prison and a mob burned the whole thing to the ground. Aurora expresses her sympathy, but tells him she still cannot think well of his wife. Romney is surprised, and tells her that he is not married to Lady Waldemar, although he has a message from her to Aurora. Aurora tears it open, and reads it.

=== Ninth Book ===
Aurora reads Lady Waldemar's letter, which claims that she did not intend to hurt Marian, only to remove her. Her scheme did not work; even after Marian was gone, Romney did not love her. She tells Aurora, in a vitriolic tone, that she, by her letter forcing Lady Waldemar to tell Romney that Marian lived, has doomed him to a loveless life with her, when he is truly in love with Aurora. Aurora, somewhat shocked both by the letter's contents and the angry rhetoric, dazedly asks Romney what he will do now, and he answers that he will marry Marian and raise her child as his own. Marian refuses him, however, stating that she prefers to remain as her child's only guardian and devote her life to him, rather than a husband, and that she has realized that what she thought was love for Romney was rather hero-worship. She leaves, urging Romney to talk to Aurora. They converse, and forgive each other for any wrongs they have done to each other over the years. Romney admits to Aurora that he is blind. Aurora, in tears, confesses to Romney that she loves him, and has finally realized it; and also realizes that, in loving him, she will be able to complete herself and find her poetic muse once more. The poem ends with Aurora and Romney in a loving embrace, as she describes the landscape for his unseeing eyes in Biblical metaphors.
