= Hugh Boyd (writer) =

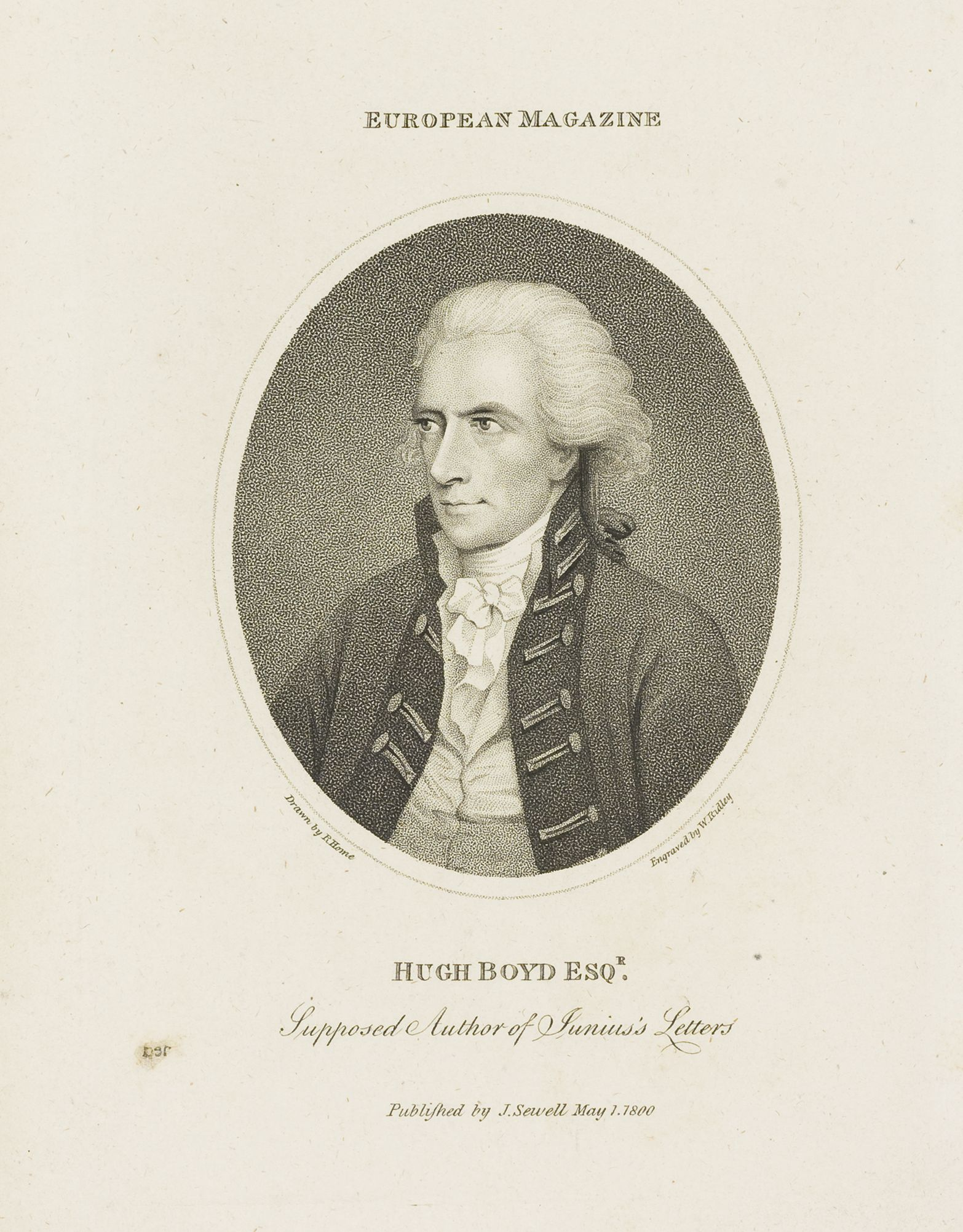
Hugh Boyd

Hugh Boyd (1746–1794) was an Irish essayist.

== Biography ==
Boyd was the second son of Alexander Macauley of County Antrim, Ireland, and Miss Boyd of Ballycastle in the same county. He was born at Ballycastle in October 1746, and showed precocious talents. He was sent to Dr. Ball's celebrated school at Dublin, and at the age of fourteen entered Trinity College, Dublin. He became M.A. in 1765, and would have entered the army, but his father's somewhat sudden death left him unprovided for. He accordingly chose the law for a profession, and went to London. There he became acquainted with Goldsmith and with Garrick. His wit and talents and his reputed skill at chess soon brought him into the best society. In 1767 he married Frances Morphy, and on the death of his maternal grandfather he took the name of Boyd.

After a visit to Ireland in 1768, during which he wrote some political letters in the Dublin journals, he lived at various places in and near London, his time and talents being devoted to literature, politics, and legal studies. During these years in London Boyd was a frequent contributor to the Public Advertiser and other journals, and was in close intimacy with the circle of Burke and Reynolds. In 1774 he began to work harder at the law, and also attended the commons' debates, which he wrote down from memory with extraordinary accuracy. In 1775 he was admitted to St John's College, Cambridge. Another visit to Ireland took place in 1776, on the occasion of an election for Antrim, the candidate for which he supported by a series of able letters under the signature of "A Freeholder".

Financial pressures eventually forced him to seek paid employment, and in 1781 he accepted the appointment of secretary to Lord Macartney, when that officer was nominated governor of Madras. Boyd now applied himself sedulously to the study of Indian affairs. Not long after his arrival at Madras he conducted a mission from the governor to the king of Kandy in Ceylon, requiring that potentate's assistance against the Dutch. On his return the vessel in which he sailed was captured by the French, and he became a prisoner for some months at the isle of Bourbon. Returning at length to India he lived for some time at Calcutta, and eventually was appointed master-attendant at Madras. In 1792 Boyd conducted a paper called the Madras Courier, and the following year projected the Indian Observer, being papers on morals and literature; and started a weekly paper, Hircarrah (i.e. messenger), as a vehicle for the essays. In 1794, he proposed to publish by subscription an account of his embassy to Kandy, and had actually begun the work when he was carried off by an attack of fever. He died on 19 October 1794.

== Bibliography ==
Boyd is represented as possessed of very high social and intellectual qualities. His claims to a place in the history of English literature rest very much on the assumption — maintained by John Almon and by George Chalmers — that he was the author of the Letters of Junius. Boyd's writings were collected and republished after his death by one of his friends in India, under the title of The Miscellaneous Works of Hugh Boyd, the author of the Letters of Junius, with an Account of his Life and Writings, by Lawrence Dundas Campbell (2 volumes, London, 1800). They comprise the Freeholder Letters; Democraticus, a series of letters printed in the Public Advertiser (1779); The Whig, a series of letters contributed to the London Courant, (1779–80); Abstracts of Two Speeches of the Earl of Chatham; Miscellaneous Poems; Journal of Embassy to the King of Candy; and the Indian Observer.
