= Elizabeth Barrett Browning =

English poet (1806–1861)

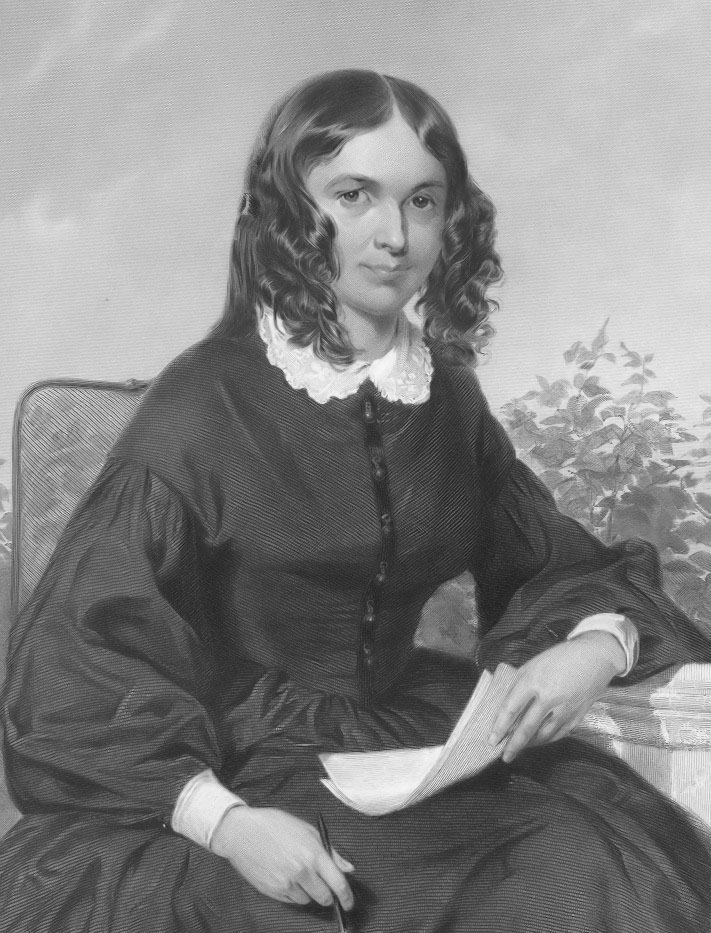
- Born: Elizabeth Barrett Moulton-Barrett; 6 March 1806 (Note: Exact date of birth may not be correct. See Early life for more information.); Coxhoe, County Durham, England
- Died: 29 June 1861 (aged 55); Florence, Italy
- Occupation: Poet
- Spouse: Robert Browning (m. 1846)
- Children: Robert Barrett ("Pen")
- Writing career
- Movement: Romanticism

Elizabeth Barrett Browning (née Moulton-Barrett; 6 March 1806 – 29 June 1861) was an English poet of the Victorian era, popular in Britain and the United States during her lifetime and frequently anthologised after her death. Her work received renewed attention following the feminist scholarship of the 1970s and 1980s, and greater recognition of women writers in English. Born in County Durham, the eldest of 12 children, Elizabeth Barrett wrote poetry from the age of eleven. Her mother's collection of her poems forms one of the largest extant collections of juvenilia by any English writer. At 15, she became ill, suffering intense head and spinal pain for the rest of her life. Later in life, she also developed lung problems, possibly tuberculosis. She took laudanum for the pain from an early age, which is likely to have contributed to her frail health.

In the 1840s, Elizabeth was introduced to literary society through her distant cousin and patron John Kenyon. Her first adult collection of poems was published in 1838, and she wrote prolifically from 1841 to 1844, producing poetry, translation, and prose. She campaigned for the abolition of slavery, and her work helped influence reform in child labour legislation. Her prolific output made her a rival to Tennyson as a candidate for poet laureate on the death of Wordsworth. Elizabeth's volume Poems (1844) brought her great success, attracting the admiration of the writer Robert Browning. Their correspondence, courtship, and marriage were carried out in secret, for fear of her father's disapproval. Following the wedding, she was indeed disinherited by her father. In 1846, the couple moved to Italy, where she lived for the rest of her life. Elizabeth died in Florence in 1861. A collection of her later poems was published by her husband shortly after her death.

They had a son, known as "Pen" (Robert Barrett, 1849–1912). Pen devoted himself to painting until his eyesight began to fail later in life. He also built a large collection of manuscripts and memorabilia of his parents, but because he died intestate, it was sold by public auction to various bidders and then scattered upon his death. The Armstrong Browning Library in Waco, Texas has recovered some of his collection, and it houses the world's largest collection of Browning memorabilia. Elizabeth's work had a major influence on prominent writers of the day, including the American poets Edgar Allan Poe and Emily Dickinson. She is remembered for such poems as "How Do I Love Thee?" (Sonnet 43, 1845) and Aurora Leigh (1856).

== Life and career ==
=== Family background ===
Elizabeth Barrett had both maternal and paternal family who profited from slavery. Her father's family had lived in the colony of Jamaica since 1655, though her father chose to raise his family in England, while his business enterprises remained in Jamaica. Their wealth derived primarily from the ownership of slave plantations in the British West Indies. Edward Barrett owned 10,000 acres (40 km^{2}) of land in the estates of Cinnamon Hill, Cornwall, Cambridge, and Oxford in northern Jamaica.

Elizabeth's maternal grandfather owned sugar plantations, sugar cane mills, glassworks and merchant ships, which traded between Jamaica and Newcastle upon Tyne.

The family wished to hand down their name, stipulating that Barrett always should be held as a surname. In some cases, inheritance was given on condition that the name be used by the beneficiary; the British upper class had long encouraged this sort of name changing. Given this strong tradition, Elizabeth used "Elizabeth Barrett Moulton Barrett" on legal documents, and before she was married, she often signed herself "Elizabeth Barrett Barrett" or "EBB" (initials which she was able to keep after her wedding).

=== Early life ===
Elizabeth Barrett Moulton-Barrett was born on (it is supposed) 6 March 1806 in Coxhoe Hall, between the villages of Coxhoe and Kelloe in County Durham, England. Her parents were Edward Barrett Moulton-Barrett and Mary Graham Clarke. However, biographers have suggested that, when she was christened on 9 March, she was already three or four months old, and that this was concealed because her parents had married only on 14 May 1805. Although she had already been baptised by a family friend in that first week of her life, she was baptised again, more publicly, on 10 February 1808 at Kelloe parish church, at the same time as her younger brother, Edward (known as Bro). He had been born in June 1807, 15 months after Elizabeth's stated date of birth. A private christening might seem unlikely for a family of standing, and while Bro's birth was celebrated with a holiday on the family's Caribbean plantations, Elizabeth's was not.

Elizabeth was the eldest of 12 children (eight boys and four girls). Eleven lived to adulthood; one daughter died at the age of 3, when Elizabeth was 8. The children all had nicknames: Elizabeth was Ba. She rode her pony, went for family walks and picnics, socialised with other county families, and participated in home theatrical productions. Unlike her siblings, she immersed herself in books as often as she could get away from the social rituals of her family.

In 1809, the family moved to Hope End, a 500-acre (200 ha) estate near the Malvern Hills in Ledbury, Herefordshire. Her father converted the Georgian house into stables and built a mansion of opulent Turkish design, which his wife described as something from the Arabian Nights' Entertainments.

The interior's brass balustrades, mahogany doors inlaid with mother-of-pearl, and finely carved fireplaces were eventually complemented by lavish landscaping: ponds, grottos, kiosks, an ice house, a hothouse, and a subterranean passage from house to gardens. Her time at Hope End inspired her in later life to write Aurora Leigh (1856), her most ambitious work, which went through more than 20 editions by 1900, but none from 1905 to 1978.

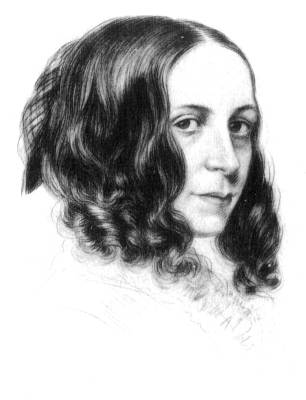
Portrait of Elizabeth Barrett Browning in 1859

She was educated at home and tutored by Daniel McSwiney with her oldest brother. She began writing verses at the age of four. During the Hope End period, she was an intensely studious, precocious child. She claimed that she was reading novels at age 6, having been entranced by Pope's translations of Homer at age 8, studying Greek at age 10, and writing her own Homeric epic The Battle of Marathon: A Poem at age 14.

In 1820, Mr Barrett privately published The Battle of Marathon, an epic-style poem, but all copies remained within the family. Her mother compiled the child's poetry into collections of "Poems by Elizabeth B. Barrett". Her father called her the "Poet Laureate of Hope End" and encouraged her work. The result is one of the larger collections of juvenilia of any English writer. Mary Russell Mitford described the young Elizabeth at this time as having "a slight, delicate figure, with a shower of dark curls falling on each side of a most expressive face; large, tender eyes, richly fringed by dark eyelashes, and a smile like a sunbeam."

At about this time, Elizabeth began to battle an illness, which the medical science of the time was unable to diagnose. All three sisters came down with the syndrome, but it lasted only with Elizabeth. She had intense head and spinal pain with loss of mobility. Various biographies link this to a riding accident at the time (she fell while trying to dismount a horse), but there is no evidence to support the link. Sent to recover at the Gloucester spa, she was treated – in the absence of symptoms supporting another diagnosis – for a spinal problem. This illness continued for the rest of her life, and it is believed to be unrelated to the lung disease that she developed in 1837.

She began to take opiates for the pain, laudanum (an opium concoction) followed by morphine, then commonly prescribed. She became dependent on them for much of her adulthood; the use from an early age may well have contributed to her frail health. Biographers such as Alethea Hayter have suggested this dependency contributed to the wild vividness of her imagination and the poetry that it produced.

By 1821, after reading Mary Wollstonecraft's A Vindication of the Rights of Woman (1792), she had become a passionate supporter of Wollstonecraft's political ideas. The child's intellectual fascination with the classics and metaphysics was reflected in a religious intensity that she later described as "not the deep persuasion of the mild Christian but the wild visions of an enthusiast." The Barretts attended services at the nearest Dissenting chapel, and Edward was active in Bible and missionary societies.

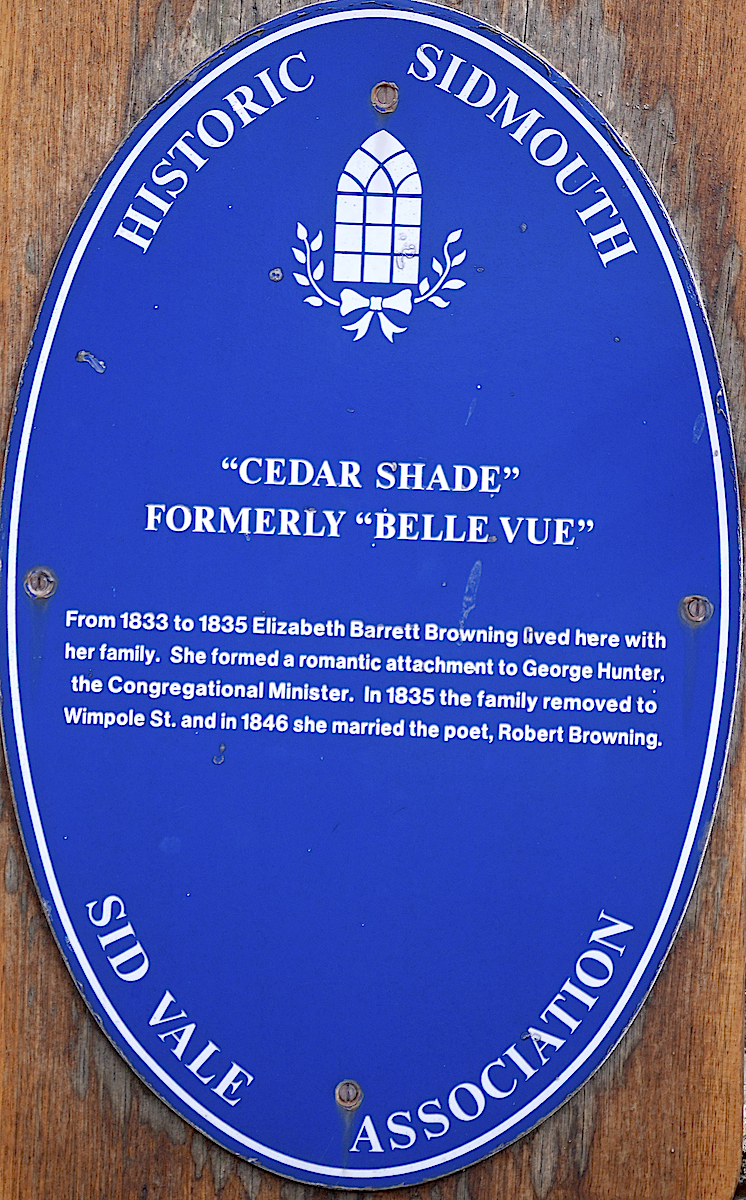
Blue plaque outside "Belle Vue" in Sidmouth, Devon, where Elizabeth Barrett lived with her family from 1833 to 1835

Elizabeth's mother died in 1828, and is buried at St Michael's Church, Ledbury, next to her daughter Mary. Sarah Graham-Clarke, Elizabeth's aunt, helped to care for the children, and she had clashes with Elizabeth's strong will. In 1831, Elizabeth's grandmother, Elizabeth Moulton, died. Following lawsuits and the abolition of slavery, Mr Barrett incurred great financial and investment losses that forced him to sell Hope End. Although the family was never poor, the place was seized and sold to satisfy creditors. Always secretive in his financial dealings, he would not discuss his situation, and the family was haunted by the idea that they might have to move to Jamaica.

From 1833 to 1835, she was living with her family at Belle Vue in Sidmouth. The site has been renamed Cedar Shade and redeveloped. A blue plaque at the entrance to the site attests to its previous existence. In 1838, some years after the sale of Hope End, the family settled at 50 Wimpole Street, Marylebone, London.

During 1837–1838, the poet was struck with illness again, with symptoms suggesting tuberculous ulceration of the lungs. The same year, at her physician's insistence, she moved from London to Torquay on the Devonshire coast. Her former home forms part of the Regina Hotel. Two tragedies then struck. In February 1840, her brother Samuel died of a fever in Jamaica, then her favourite brother Edward (Bro) was drowned in a sailing accident in Torquay in July. These events had a serious effect on her already fragile health. She felt guilty as her father had disapproved of Edward's trip to Torquay. She wrote to Mitford, "That was a very near escape from madness, absolute hopeless madness". The family returned to Wimpole Street in 1841.

=== Success ===
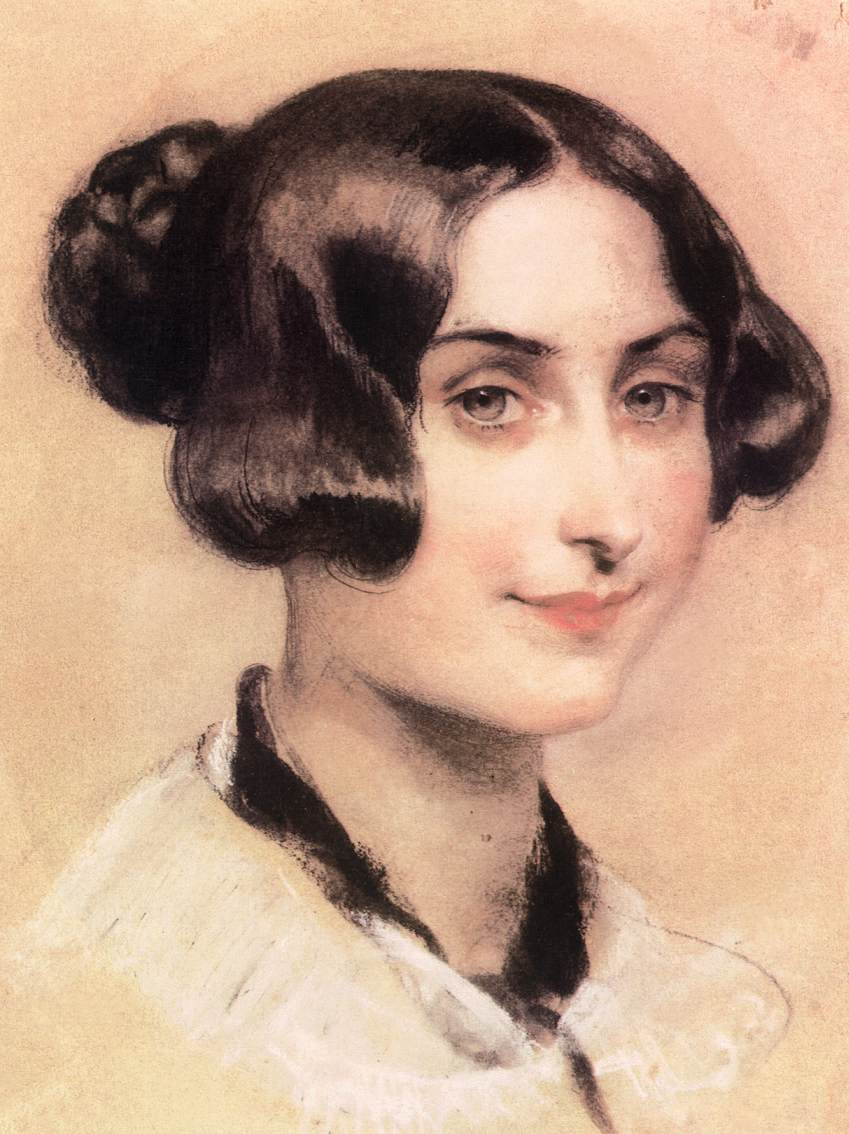
Portrait of Elizabeth Barrett by Károly Brocky, c. 1839–1844

At Wimpole Street, Elizabeth spent most of her time in her upstairs room. Her health began to improve, but she saw few people other than her immediate family. One of those was John Kenyon, a wealthy friend and distant cousin of the family and patron of the arts. She received comfort from a spaniel named Flush, a gift from Mary Mitford. (Virginia Woolf later fictionalised the life of the dog, making him the protagonist of her 1933 novel Flush: A Biography).

From 1841 to 1844, Elizabeth was prolific in poetry, translation, and prose. The poem The Cry of the Children, published in 1843 in Blackwood's, condemned child labour and helped bring about child-labour reforms by raising support for Lord Shaftesbury's Ten Hours Bill (1844). About the same time, she contributed critical prose pieces to Richard Henry Horne's A New Spirit of the Age, including a laudatory essay on Thomas Carlyle.

In 1844, she published the two-volume Poems, which included "A Drama of Exile", "A Vision of Poets", and "Lady Geraldine's Courtship", and two substantial critical essays for 1842 issues of The Athenaeum. A self-proclaimed "adorer of Carlyle", she sent a copy to him as "a tribute of admiration & respect", which began a correspondence between them. "Since she was not burdened with any domestic duties expected of her sisters, Barrett Browning could now devote herself entirely to the life of the mind, cultivating an enormous correspondence, reading widely". Her prolific output made her a rival to Tennyson as a candidate for poet laureate in 1850 on the death of Wordsworth.

A Royal Society of Arts blue plaque commemorates Elizabeth at 50 Wimpole Street.

=== Robert Browning and Italy ===
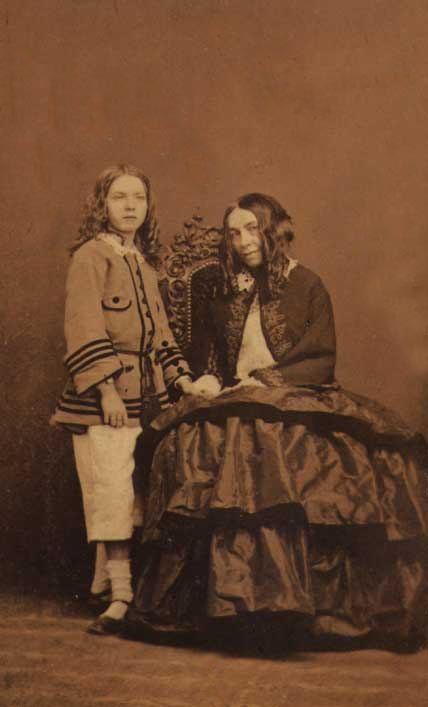
Elizabeth Barrett Browning with her son Pen, 1860

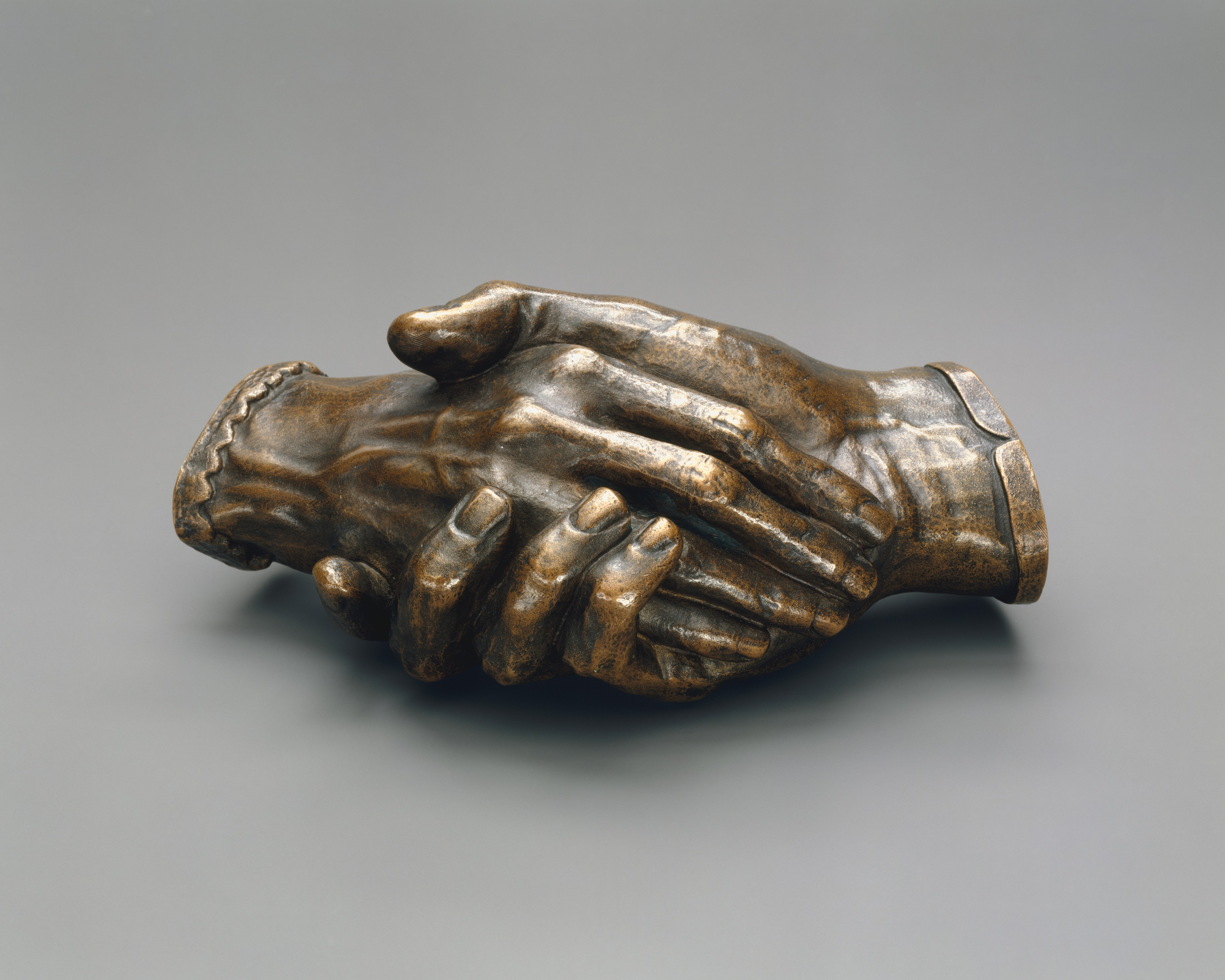
Clasped Hands of Robert and Elizabeth Barrett Browning, 1853 by Harriet Hosmer.

Her 1844 volume Poems made her one of the more popular writers in the country and inspired Robert Browning to write to her. He wrote "I love your verses with all my heart, dear Miss Barrett," praising their "fresh strange music, the affluent language, the exquisite pathos and true new brave thought."

Kenyon arranged for Browning to meet Elizabeth on 20 May 1845, in her rooms, and so began one of the most famous courtships in literature. Elizabeth had produced a large amount of work, but Browning had a great influence on her subsequent writing as did she on his: two of Barrett's most famous pieces were written after she met Browning, Sonnets from the Portuguese and Aurora Leigh. Robert's Men and Women is also a product of that time.

Some critics state that her activity was, in some ways, in decay before she met Browning: "Until her relationship with Robert Browning began in 1845, Barrett's willingness to engage in public discourse about social issues and about aesthetic issues in poetry, which had been so strong in her youth, gradually diminished, as did her physical health. As an intellectual presence and a physical being, she was becoming a shadow of herself."

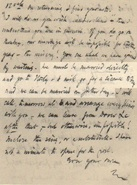
Letter from Robert Browning to Elizabeth Barrett, 10 September 1846

The courtship and marriage between Robert Browning and Elizabeth were conducted secretly as she knew her father would disapprove. After a private marriage at St Marylebone Parish Church, they honeymooned in Paris and then moved to Italy in September 1846, which became their home almost continuously until her death. Elizabeth's loyal lady's maid Elizabeth Wilson witnessed the marriage and accompanied the couple to Italy.

Mr Barrett disinherited Elizabeth as he did each of his children who married. Elizabeth had foreseen her father's anger but had not anticipated her brothers' rejection. As Elizabeth had some money of her own, the couple were reasonably comfortable in Italy. The Brownings were well respected and even famous. Elizabeth grew stronger, and in 1849, at the age of 43, between four miscarriages, she gave birth to a son, Robert Wiedeman Barrett Browning, whom they called Pen. Their son later married, but had no legitimate children.

At her husband's insistence, Elizabeth's second edition of Poems included her love sonnets; as a result, her popularity increased (as did critical regard), and her artistic position was confirmed. During the years of her marriage, her literary reputation far surpassed that of her poet-husband; when visitors came to their home in Florence, she was invariably the greater attraction.

The couple came to know a wide circle of artists and writers, including William Makepeace Thackeray, sculptor Harriet Hosmer (who, she wrote, seemed to be the "perfectly emancipated female") and Harriet Beecher Stowe. In 1849, she met Margaret Fuller; Carlyle in 1851; French novelist George Sand in 1852, whom she had long admired. Among her intimate friends in Florence was the writer Isa Blagden, whom she encouraged to write novels. They met Alfred Tennyson in Paris, and John Forster, Samuel Rogers and the Carlyles in London, later befriending Charles Kingsley and John Ruskin.

=== Decline and death ===
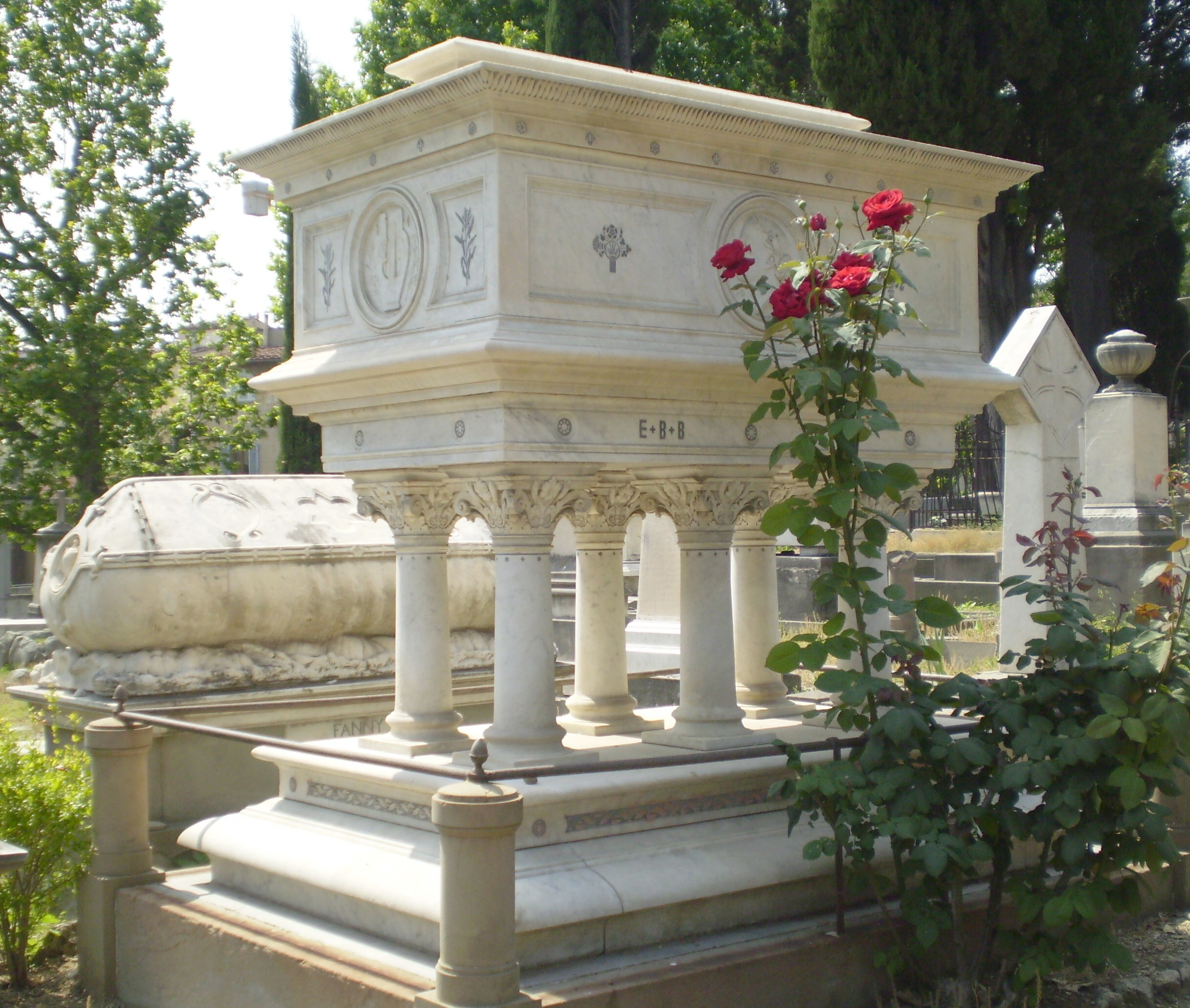
Elizabeth Barrett Browning's tomb, English Cemetery, Florence. 2007

After the death of an old friend, G. B. Hunter, and then of her father, Barrett Browning's health started to deteriorate. The Brownings moved from Florence to Siena, residing at the Villa Alberti. Engrossed in Italian politics, she issued a small volume of political poems titled Poems before Congress (1860) "most of which were written to express her sympathy with the Italian cause after the outbreak of fighting in 1859". They caused a furore in Britain, and the conservative magazines Blackwood's and the Saturday Review labelled her a fanatic. She dedicated this book to her husband. Her last work was A Musical Instrument, published posthumously.

Barrett Browning's sister Henrietta died in November 1860. The couple spent the winter of 1860–1861 in Rome where Barrett Browning's health deteriorated, and they returned to Florence in early June 1861. She became gradually weaker, using morphine to ease her pain. She died on 29 June 1861 in her husband's arms. Browning said that she died "smilingly, happily, and with a face like a girl's...Her last word was...'Beautiful' ". She was buried in the Protestant English Cemetery of Florence. "On Monday July 1 the shops in the area around Casa Guidi were closed, while Elizabeth was mourned with unusual demonstrations." The nature of her illness is still unclear. Some modern scientists speculate her illness may have been hypokalemic periodic paralysis, a genetic disorder that causes weakness and many of the other symptoms she described.

=== Publications ===
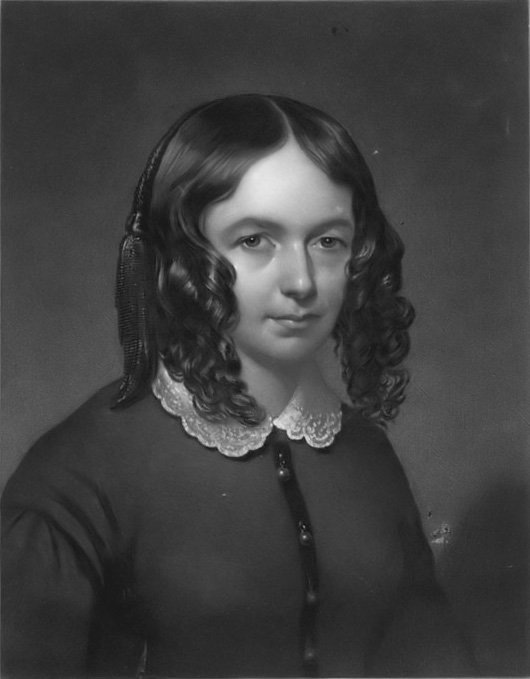
An engraving of Elizabeth Barrett Browning, published in Eclectic Magazine

Barrett Browning's first known poem "On the Cruelty of Forcement to Man" was written at the age of 6 or 8. The manuscript, which protests against impressment, is in the Berg Collection of the New York Public Library; the exact date is controversial because the "2" in the date 1812 is written over something else that is scratched out.

Her first independent publication was "Stanzas Excited by Reflections on the Present State of Greece" in The New Monthly Magazine of May 1821; followed two months later by "Thoughts Awakened by Contemplating a Piece of the Palm which Grows on the Summit of the Acropolis at Athens".

Her first collection of poems, An Essay on Mind, with Other Poems, was published in 1826 and reflected her passion for Byron and Greek politics. Its publication drew the attention of Hugh Stuart Boyd, a blind scholar of the Greek language, and of Uvedale Price, another Greek scholar, with whom she maintained sustained correspondence. Among other neighbours was Mrs James Martin from Colwall, with whom she corresponded throughout her life. Later, at Boyd's suggestion, she translated Aeschylus' Prometheus Bound (published in 1833; retranslated in 1850). During their friendship, Barrett studied Greek literature, including Homer, Pindar and Aristophanes.

Elizabeth opposed slavery and published two poems highlighting the barbarity of the institution and her support for the abolitionist cause: "The Runaway Slave at Pilgrim's Point" and "A Curse for a Nation". The first depicts an enslaved woman whipped, raped, and made pregnant cursing her enslavers. Elizabeth declared herself glad that the slaves were "virtually free" when the Slavery Abolition Act passed in the British Parliament despite the fact that her father believed that abolition would ruin his business.

The date of publication of these poems is in dispute, but her position on slavery in the poems is clear and may have led to a rift between Elizabeth and her father. She wrote to John Ruskin in 1855 "I belong to a family of West Indian slaveholders, and if I believed in curses, I should be afraid". Her father and uncle were unaffected by the Baptist War (1831–1832) and continued to own slaves until passage of the Slavery Abolition Act.

In London, John Kenyon introduced Elizabeth to literary figures including William Wordsworth, Mary Russell Mitford, Samuel Taylor Coleridge, Alfred Tennyson and Thomas Carlyle. Elizabeth continued to write, contributing "The Romaunt of Margaret", "The Romaunt of the Page", "The Poet's Vow" and other pieces to various periodicals. She corresponded with other writers, including Mary Russell Mitford, who became a close friend and who supported Elizabeth's literary ambitions.

In 1838 The Seraphim and Other Poems appeared, the first volume of Elizabeth's mature poetry to appear under her own name.

Sonnets from the Portuguese was published in 1850. There is debate about the origin of the title. Some say it refers to the series of sonnets of the 16th-century Portuguese poet Luís de Camões. However, "my little Portuguese" was a pet name that Browning had adopted for Elizabeth and this may have some connection.

The verse-novel Aurora Leigh, her most ambitious and perhaps the most popular of her longer poems, appeared in 1856. It is the story of a female writer making her way in life, balancing work and love, and based on Elizabeth's own experiences. Aurora Leigh was an important influence on American social reformer and women's rights activist Susan B. Anthony's thinking about the traditional roles of women, with regard to marriage versus independent individuality. The North American Review praised Elizabeth's poem: "Mrs. Browning's poems are, in all respects, the utterance of a woman – of a woman of great learning, rich experience, and powerful genius, uniting to her woman's nature the strength which is sometimes thought peculiar to a man."

== Spiritual influence ==
Much of Barrett Browning's work carries a religious theme. She had read and studied such works as Milton's Paradise Lost and Dante's Inferno. She says in her writing, "We want the sense of the saturation of Christ's blood upon the souls of our poets, that it may cry through them in answer to the ceaseless wail of the Sphinx of our humanity, expounding agony into renovation. Something of this has been perceived in art when its glory was at the fullest. Something of a yearning after this may be seen among the Greek Christian poets, something which would have been much with a stronger faculty". She believed that "Christ's religion is essentially poetry – poetry glorified". She explored the religious aspect in many of her poems, especially in her early work, such as the sonnets.

She was interested in theological debate, had learned Hebrew and read the Hebrew Bible. Her seminal Aurora Leigh, for example, features religious imagery and allusion to the apocalypse. The critic Cynthia Scheinberg notes that female characters in Aurora Leigh and her earlier work "The Virgin Mary to the Child Jesus" allude to Miriam, sister and caregiver to Moses. These allusions to Miriam in both poems mirror the way in which Barrett Browning herself drew from Jewish history, while distancing herself from it, in order to maintain the cultural norms of a Christian woman poet of the Victorian Age.

In the correspondence Barrett Browning kept with the Reverend William Merry from 1843 to 1844 on predestination and salvation by works, she identifies herself as a Congregationalist: "I am not a Baptist — but a Congregational Christian, — in the holding of my private opinions."

== Barrett Browning Institute ==
In 1892, Ledbury, Herefordshire, held a design competition to build an Institute in honour of Barrett Browning. Brightwen Binyon beat 44 other designs. It was based on the timber-framed Market House, which was opposite the site, and was completed in 1896. However, Nikolaus Pevsner was not impressed by its style. It was used as a public library from 1938 to 2021, when new library facilities were provided for the town, and it became the headquarters of the Ledbury Poetry Festival. It has been Grade II-listed since 2007.

== Critical reception ==
How Do I Love Thee?

How do I love thee? Let me count the ways.
I love thee to the depth and breadth and height
My soul can reach, when feeling out of sight
For the ends of being and ideal grace.
I love thee to the level of every day's
Most quiet need, by sun and candle-light.
I love thee freely, as men strive for right.
I love thee purely, as they turn from praise.
I love thee with the passion put to use
In my old griefs, and with my childhood's faith.
I love thee with a love I seemed to lose
With my lost saints. I love thee with the breath,
Smiles, tears, of all my life; and, if God choose,
I shall but love thee better after death.

— Sonnet XLIII
from Sonnets from the Portuguese, 1845 (published 1850)

Barrett Browning was widely popular in the United Kingdom and the United States during her lifetime. Edgar Allan Poe was inspired by her poem Lady Geraldine's Courtship and specifically borrowed the poem's metre for his poem The Raven. Poe had reviewed Barrett Browning's work in the January 1845 issue of the Broadway Journal, writing that "her poetic inspiration is the highest – we can conceive of nothing more august. Her sense of Art is pure in itself." In return, she praised The Raven, and Poe dedicated his 1845 collection The Raven and Other Poems to her, referring to her as "the noblest of her sex".

Barrett Browning's poetry greatly influenced Emily Dickinson, who admired her as a woman of achievement. Her popularity in the United States and Britain was advanced by her stands against social injustice, including slavery in the United States, injustice toward Italians from their foreign rulers, and child labour.

Lilian Whiting published a biography of Barrett Browning (1899), which describes her as "the most philosophical poet" and depicts her life as "a Gospel of applied Christianity". To Whiting, the term "art for art's sake" did not apply to Barrett Browning's work, as each poem, distinctively purposeful, was borne of a more "honest vision". In this critical analysis, Whiting portrays Barrett Browning as a poet who uses knowledge of Classical literature with an "intuitive gift of spiritual divination". In Elizabeth Barrett Browning, Angela Leighton suggests that the portrayal of Barrett Browning as the "pious iconography of womanhood" has distracted us from her poetic achievements. Leighton cites the 1931 play by Rudolf Besier The Barretts of Wimpole Street as evidence that 20th-century literary criticism of Barrett Browning's work has suffered more as a result of her popularity than poetic ineptitude. The play was popularized by actress Katharine Cornell, for whom it became a signature role. It was an enormous success, both artistically and commercially, and was revived several times and adapted twice into movies. Sampson, however, considers the play to have been the most damaging cause of false myths about Elizabeth, and particularly the relationship with her, allegedly 'tyrannical', father.

Throughout the 20th century, literary criticism of Barrett Browning's poetry remained sparse until her poems were discovered by the women's movement. She once described herself as being inclined to reject several women's rights principles, suggesting in letters to Mary Russell Mitford and her husband that she believed that there was an inferiority of intellect in women. In Aurora Leigh, however, she created a strong and independent woman who embraces both work and love. Leighton writes that because Elizabeth participates in the literary world, where voice and diction are dominated by perceived masculine superiority, she "is defined only in mysterious opposition to everything that distinguishes the male subject who writes..." A five-volume scholarly edition of her works was published in 2010, the first in over a century.

== Collections ==
Material relating to the Brownings is found in many institutions across the world:

- The Armstrong Browning Library and Museum at Baylor University, Texas houses the world's largest collection of material relating to the Brownings, spanning books, correspondence, memorabilia and manuscripts. It was established in 1918 by A.J. Armstrong, who had become interested in the Brownings from 1905 - 1909 when he met their son Robert Barrett Browning.
- Balliol College, Oxford holds a collection of 'Browningiana' which was initially started by Browning himself after he met the master of Balliol, Benjamin Jowett, whilst seeking to send his son to the college. Balliol's collection contains manuscript material, relics, and published works.
- The Harry Ransom Center in Austin, Texas holds 8 boxes of correspondence and works relating to the Browning family.
- The Beinecke Rare Book and Manuscript Library at Yale University holds a mixed-provenance collection relating to both Robert Browning and Elizabeth Barrett Browning, which includes correspondence and manuscripts.

== Works ==
=== Collections ===
- 1820: The Battle of Marathon: A Poem. Privately printed
- 1826: An Essay on Mind, with Other Poems. London: James Duncan
- 1833: Prometheus Bound, Translated from the Greek of Aeschylus, and Miscellaneous Poems. London: A.J. Valpy
- 1838: The Seraphim, and Other Poems. London: Saunders and Otley
- 1844: Poems (UK) / A Drama of Exile, and other Poems (US). London: Edward Moxon. New York: Henry G. Langley
- 1850: Poems ("New Edition", 2 vols.) Revision of 1844 edition adding Sonnets from the Portuguese and others. London: Chapman & Hall
- 1851: Casa Guidi Windows. London: Chapman & Hall
- 1853: Poems (3d ed.). London: Chapman & Hall
- 1854: Two Poems: "A Plea for the Ragged Schools of London" (by Elizabeth Barrett Browning) and "The Twins" (by Robert Browning). London: Chapman & Hall
- 1856: Poems (4th ed.). London: Chapman & Hall
- 1856: Aurora Leigh. London: Chapman & Hall
- 1860: Poems Before Congress. London: Chapman & Hall
- 1862: Last Poems. London: Chapman & Hall

=== Posthumous publications ===
- 1863: The Greek Christian Poets and the English Poets. London: Chapman & Hall
- 1877: The Earlier Poems of Elizabeth Barrett Browning, 1826–1833, ed. Richard Herne Shepherd. London: Bartholomew Robson
- 1877: Letters of Elizabeth Barrett Browning Addressed to Richard Hengist Horne, with comments on contemporaries, 2 vols., ed. S.R.T. Mayer. London: Richard Bentley & Son
- 1897: Letters of Elizabeth Barrett Browning, 2 vols., ed. Frederic G. Kenyon. London:Smith, Elder,& Co.
- 1899: Letters of Robert Browning and Elizabeth Barrett Barrett 1845–1846, 2 vol., ed Robert W. Barrett Browning. London: Smith, Elder & Co.
- 1914: New Poems by Robert Browning and Elizabeth Barrett Browning, ed. Frederic G Kenyon. London: Smith, Elder & Co.
- 1929: Elizabeth Barrett Browning: Letters to Her Sister, 1846–1859, ed. Leonard Huxley. London: John Murray
- 1935: Twenty-Two Unpublished Letters of Elizabeth Barrett Browning and Robert Browning to Henrietta and Arabella Moulton Barrett. New York: United Feature Syndicate
- 1939: Letters from Elizabeth Barrett to B.R. Haydon, ed. Martha Hale Shackford. New York: Oxford University Press
- 1954: Elizabeth Barrett to Miss Mitford, ed. Betty Miller. London: John Murray
- 1955: Unpublished Letters of Elizabeth Barrett Browning to Hugh Stuart Boyd, ed. Barbara P. McCarthy. New Heaven, Conn.: Yale University Press
- 1958: Letters of the Brownings to George Barrett, ed. Paul Landis with Ronald E. Freeman. Urbana: University of Illinois Press
- 1974: Elizabeth Barrett Browning's Letters to Mrs. David Ogilvy, 1849–1861, ed. P. Heydon and P. Kelley. New York: Quadrangle, New York Times Book Co., and Browning Institute
- 1984: The Brownings' Correspondence, ed. Phillip Kelley, Ronald Hudson, and Scott Lewis. Winfield, Kansas: Wedgestone Press
