= Hosmer (surname) =

Hosmer is a surname. Notable people with the surname include:

- Andrew Hosmer (born 1964), New Hampshire state senator
- Bradley C. Hosmer (born 1937), twelfth Superintendent of the United States Air Force Academy
- Craig Hosmer (1915–1982), United States Representative from California
- Dorothy Hosmer (1911–2008), American photographer and travel writer
- Eric Hosmer (born 1989), American professional baseball player
- Frederick Lucian Hosmer (1840–1929), American Unitarian hymnist
- George Hosmer (1781–1861), U.S. lawyer and politician
- George Washington Hosmer (1804–1881), American educator
- Harriet Goodhue Hosmer (1830–1908), American sculptor
- Henry J. Hosmer (1832–1902), American politician and businessman
- Hezekiah L. Hosmer (1765–1814), U.S. Representative from New York
- Hezekiah Lord Hosmer (judge) (1814–1893), American lawyer, judge, journalist, and author
- James Kendall Hosmer (1834–1927), American educator, historian and writer
- Jean Hosmer (1842–1890), American actress
- Ralph Hosmer (1874–1963), Hawaii's First Forester
- Sasha Hosmer (born 1998), frontperson of New York City slowcore band Heaviness Fell
- Stephen Hosmer (1763–1834), Connecticut jurist
- Titus Hosmer (1736–1780), Continental Congressman from Connecticut and father of Stephen Hosmer
- Thomas Hosmer Shepherd (1793–1864), English watercolor artist
- Trina Hosmer (born 1945), American cross-country skier
- William Hosmer (1810–1889), American anti-slavery author and editor
- William Howe Cuyler Hosmer (1814–1877), American poet
