= Hosker =

Hosker is a surname. Notable people with the surname include:

- Bobby Hosker (born 1955), British footballer
- Gerald Hosker (1933–2024), British lawyer and public servant

== See also ==
- Hosmer (surname)
