= Senator Hosmer =

Senator Hosmer may refer to:

- Andrew Hosmer (born 1964), New Hampshire State Senate
- Stephen Hosmer (1763–1834), Connecticut State Senate
