= Chestnut Street Theatre =

Former theater in Philadelphia, Pennsylvania

Coordinates: 39.9494°N 75.1511°W

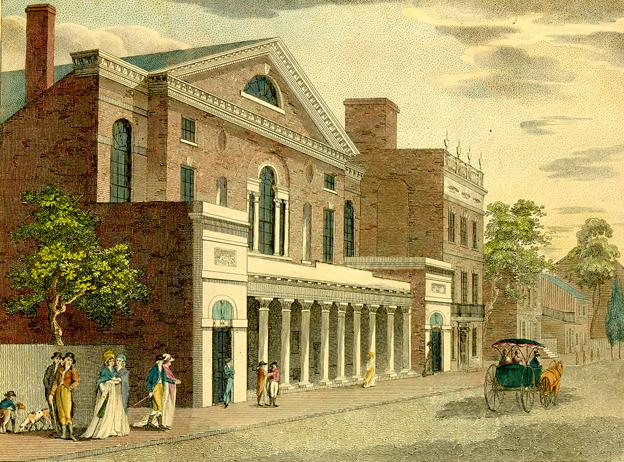
The New Theatre (c.1820)

The Chestnut Street Theatre in Philadelphia, Pennsylvania was the first theater in the United States built by entrepreneurs solely as a venue for paying audiences.

== The New Theatre (First Chestnut Street Theatre) ==
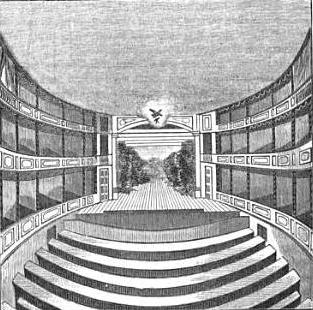
The interior of the theatre

The Chestnut Street Theatre (originally named the New Theatre) was the brainchild of Thomas Wignell and Alexander Reinagle who in 1791 convinced a group of Philadelphia investors to build a theater suitable for Wignell's company to perform in. Wignell had not yet formed his company when the New Theatre was being set up to be built, but as the New Theater was being built, Wignell was in England recruiting actors to be a part of his company. The New Theater's design, modeled after the Theatre Royal, Bath, was made possible by John Inigo Richards, Wignell's brother-in-law, who obtained architect Thomas Greenway's original plans.

The New Theatre was built on Chestnut Street near the corner of Sixth Street across from Congress Hall, and opened its doors on February 2, 1793. $30,000 was raised for the construction of the building and the final touches were not completed until 1805 under architect Benjamin Henry Latrobe.

The stage ran with a depth of seventy-one feet and had a width of thirty feet. The three tiers of boxes could hold nine hundred people; the theatre itself was able to hold an audience of two thousand. There were multiple dressing rooms, two green rooms, and for the first time in America a large well-stocked wardrobe. There were two different entrances from the street for the theatre patrons, those going to the pit and those headed to the boxes. The entryway to the pit was only eighteen inches wide, a death trap in the event of a fire. Like English theatres the New Theatre on Chestnut Street had all the essentials. A proscenium with proscenium doors in the proscenium walls with a balcony overhead. Not long after its construction the New Theatre was often referred to as one of the Seven Wonders of America.

A yellow fever epidemic spoiled the theater's debut in 1793, and its first regular season did not begin until the following year when the inaugural night's entertainment offered a double feature, John O'Keeffe's Castle of Andalusia and Hannah Cowley's Who's the Dupe? Over the following twenty-seven years the theater would become a showcase for works by local and national dramatist of the day. Hail to the Chief, the anthem that introduces and plays out the President of the United States debuted at this theatre.

In 1816 the New Theatre became the first American theater to be illuminated by gas fixtures rather than candlelight or oil lamps. Four years later a suspicious fire destroyed the theater along with its library, music, scenery and costumes. The cause of the fire remained a mystery since the building had been vacant for several days while the company was engaged in Baltimore.

== Second Chestnut Street Theatre ==
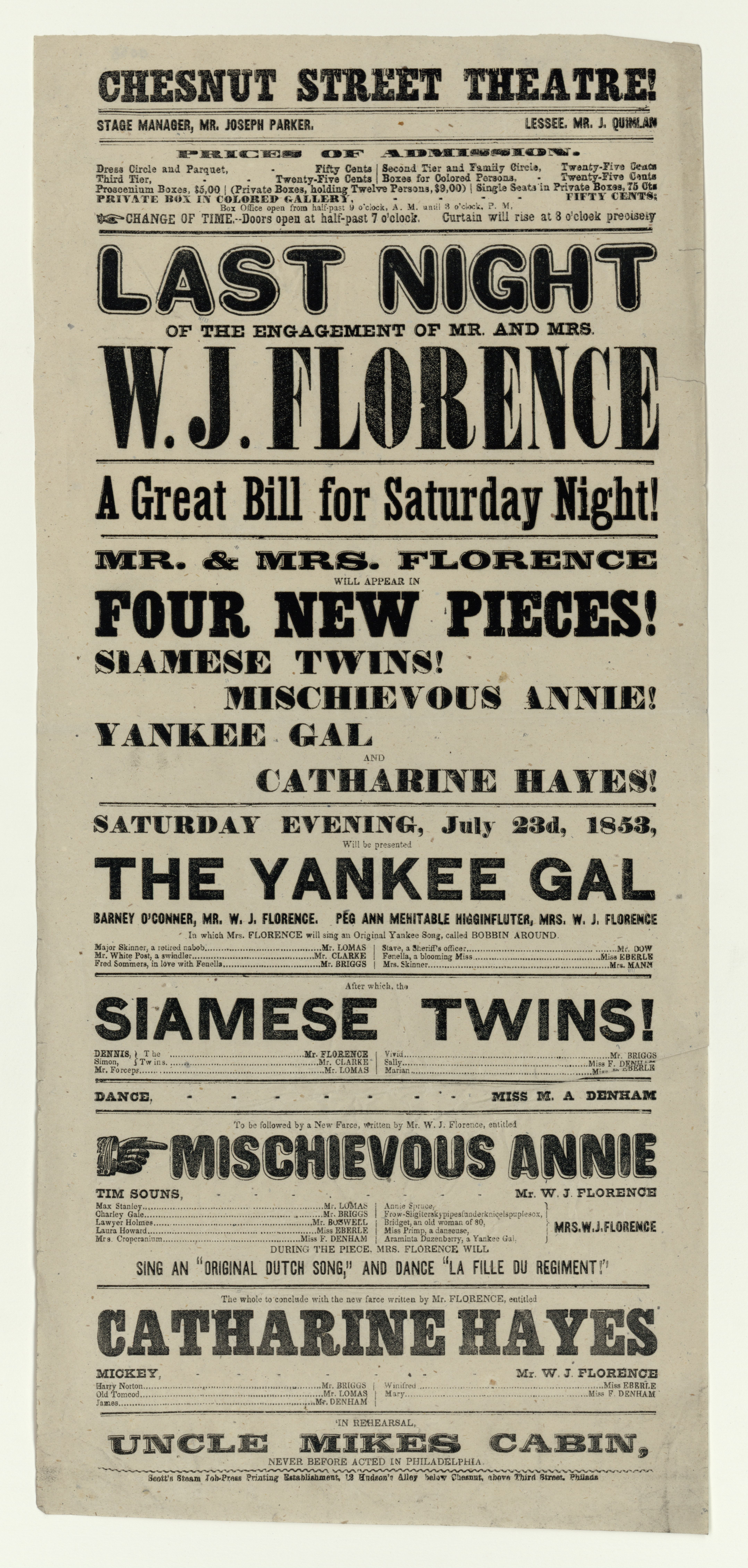
Advertisement for plays at the Chestnut Street Theatre, July 1853

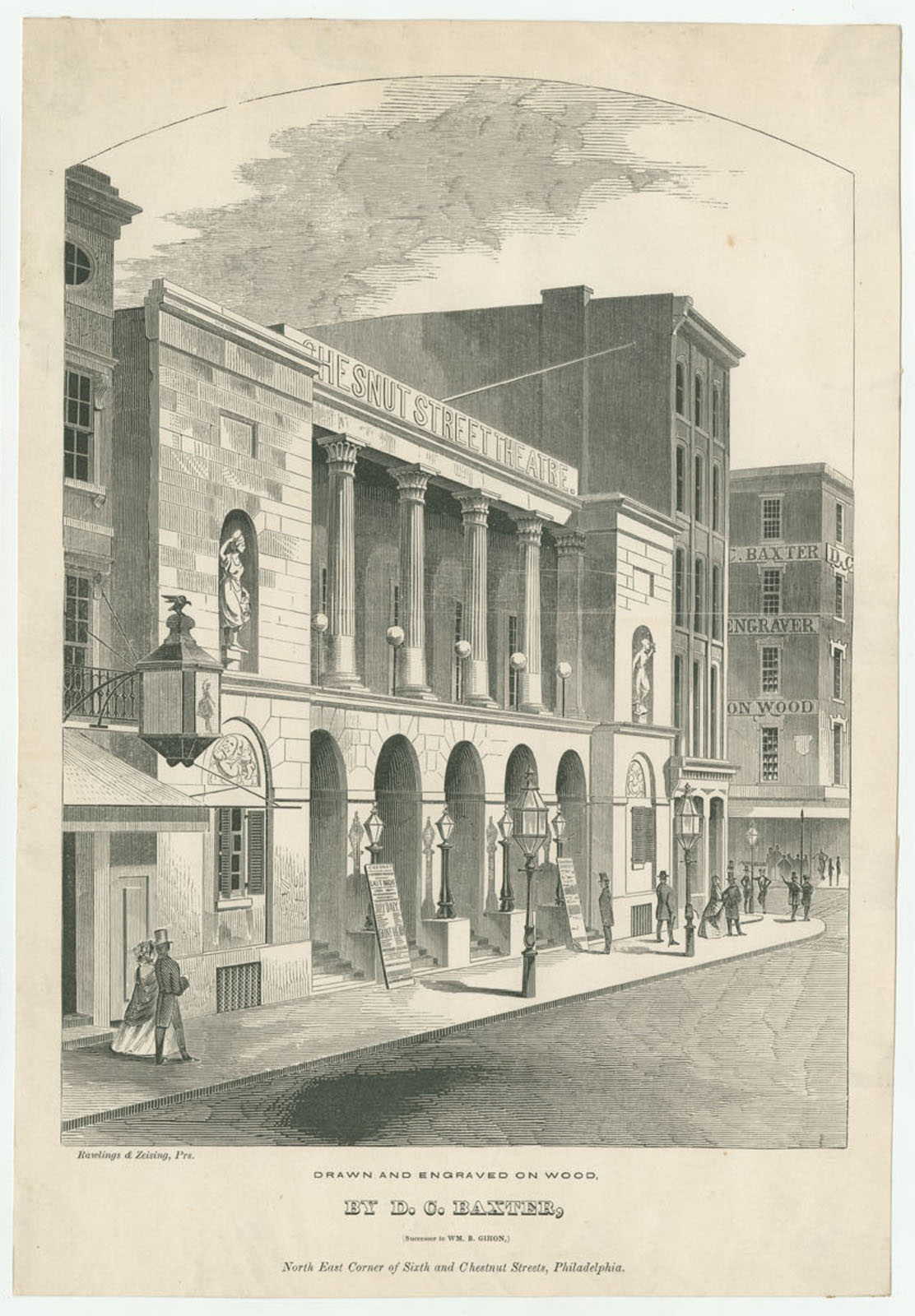
The Second Chestnut Street Theatre in 1855

Two years later, the second Chestnut Street Theatre was built in the same area as the first. It was built in the customary design of the day by architect William Strickland with triple tiers of boxes making a horseshoe around the orchestra and apron of the stage that accommodated about 2,000 theatergoers. The façade was made of Italian-style marble with an arcade supported by a row of composite columns with a plain entablature. The entrance stood between two wings whose niches held statues of Tragedy and Comedy by William Rush. Below the statues were semi-circular recesses containing basso relievos of tragic and comic muses. (Note: During this period in American orthography, it became usual to spell the street name "Chesnut", which is why the inscription on the facade of the building does not include the internal T. This particular spelling was abandoned in later years.)

The second Chestnut Street Theatre was demolished in 1855. The neighborhood around Chestnut and Sixth had become increasingly unfashionable and the narrow streets were often congested by business traffic. In addition, The Chestnut Street Theatre, which had been a home to opera performances in Philadelphia for many years, was now regarded as too small and cramped for the Grand Opera performances of the era. In 1854, a committee of prominent Philadelphians funded and ordered construction of the much larger and grander American Academy of Music on Broad Street, which was completed and opened in early 1857. Some of the traditions of "Old Drury" were imported to the academy, including the bell that announced the rising of the opening curtain.

== Third Chestnut Street Theatre ==
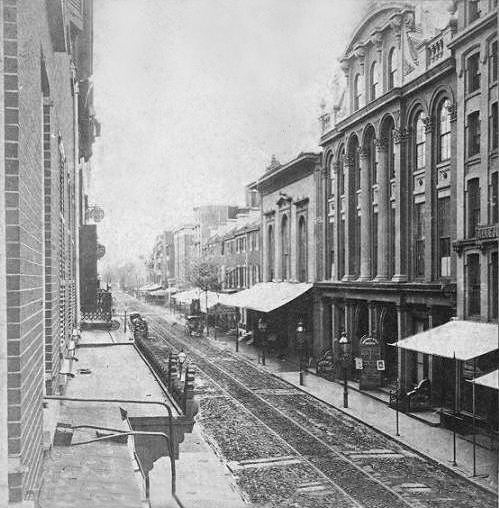
Third Chestnut Street Theatre on the right (c.1860s)

The third Chestnut Street Theatre was built in 1862, seven blocks to the west of its original location, where once again it found favor with Philadelphia audiences as a fashionable night spot. Tragic actress Jean Hosmer was among those who starred at the debut of the third theater.

It closed its doors for the last time in 1913 after the curtain fell on the final act of Arthur Wing Pinero's The Second Mrs Tanqueray. The building was demolished in 1917.

== Notable performers ==
- Ann Brunton Merry
- Ann Maria Thorne (a/k/a "Mrs. French"; 1813—1881)
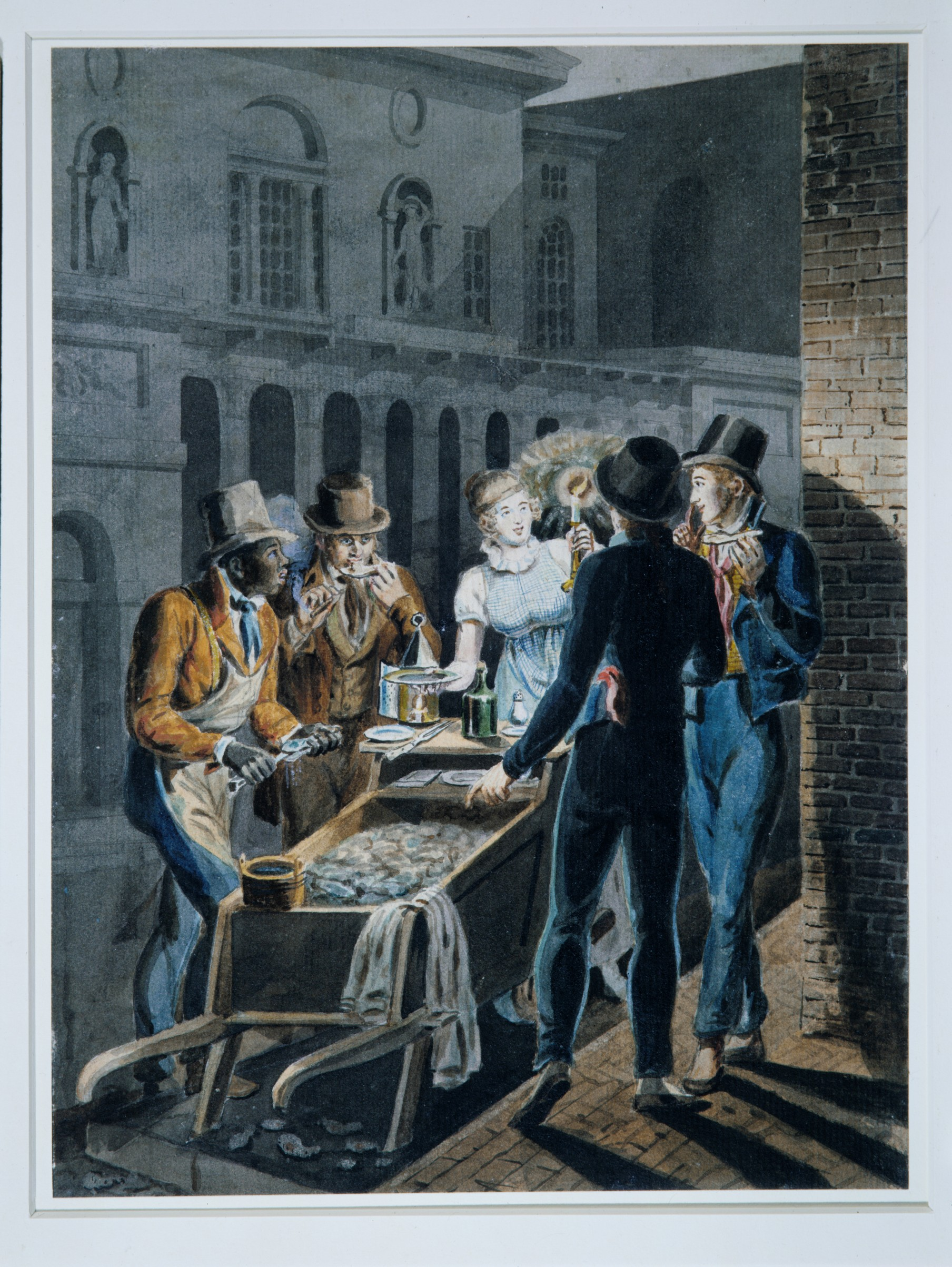
John Lewis Krimmel, An Oyster Barrow in front of the Chestnut Street Theater (ca.1813)
