= Hezekiah Lord Hosmer (judge) =

American lawyer, judge, and writer (1814–1893)

Hezekiah Lord Hosmer II (December 10, 1814 – October 31, 1893) was an American lawyer, judge, journalist, and author.

== Biography ==
Hosmer was born into a prominent family. His grandfather Titus Hosmer signed the Articles of Confederation for Connecticut; his uncle Stephen Hosmer was chief justice of the Connecticut Supreme Court; and his father, Hezekiah Lord Hosmer, was a U. S. Representative from New York who died six months before Hosmer's birth.

Hosmer started studying law in Cleveland, Ohio, at the age of 16. At 22 he moved west to the Maumee Valley of Ohio. From 1848 to 1854 he was the editor of the Toledo Blade newspaper. After serving as secretary to the Committee of Territories of the U. S. House of Representatives, Hosmer was appointed first chief justice of the Montana Territory Supreme Court in 1864 by President Abraham Lincoln, serving until 1868. From 1869 to 1872 he was the postmaster in Virginia City. He then moved to San Francisco, California, where he had obtained a position in the Customs House, and remained there until his death.

Hosmer was active in Freemasonry for most of his life. While in Toledo he was Master of a lodge and held offices on the state level, serving as Deputy Grand Master of the Grand Lodge of Ohio. In Montana he was the first Master of Montana Lodge #2 and served several terms as the Grand Secretary of the Montana Grand Lodge. At his death he had for ten years been the Grand Prelate of the Grand Commandery of California.

Hosmer was one of the original incorporators of the Montana Historical Society and was its first Historian.

== Works ==
Hosmer authored a number of works on various subjects: a history, Early History of the Maumee Valley (1858); an anti-slavery novel, Adela, the Octoroon (1860); and Bacon and Shakespeare in the Sonnets (1887).

== Family ==
He was married four times: to Sarah E. Seward (died July 8, 1839), Jane Eliza Thompson (died March 4, 1848; their only child, Richard Alsop Hosmer, died April 16, 1848, aged less than six months), and Mary Daniels (Stower) born July 8, 1818, in Abergavenny, Monmouth, Wales (sister of New York Supreme Court Justice Charles Daniels), married September 12, 1849, with whom he had three children. His son John Allen Hosmer (1850–1907) self-published a travel narrative A Trip to the States, By Way of the Yellowstone and Missouri in Virginia City in 1867; it was the first such book published in the Montana Territory. Hosmer's third wife died on April 30, 1858, and is buried in Collingwood cemetery in Toledo, Ohio. In August 1864, in Philadelphia, he married his fourth wife, Sallie Cotney (marriage license has it hand-written as Cottney), born May 22, 1842, who survived him.

Hosmer died in San Francisco, California in 1893, aged 78, and was interred at Cypress Lawn Memorial Park in Colma, California.
