= Clasped Hands of Robert and Elizabeth Barrett Browning =

1853 sculpture by Harriet Hosner

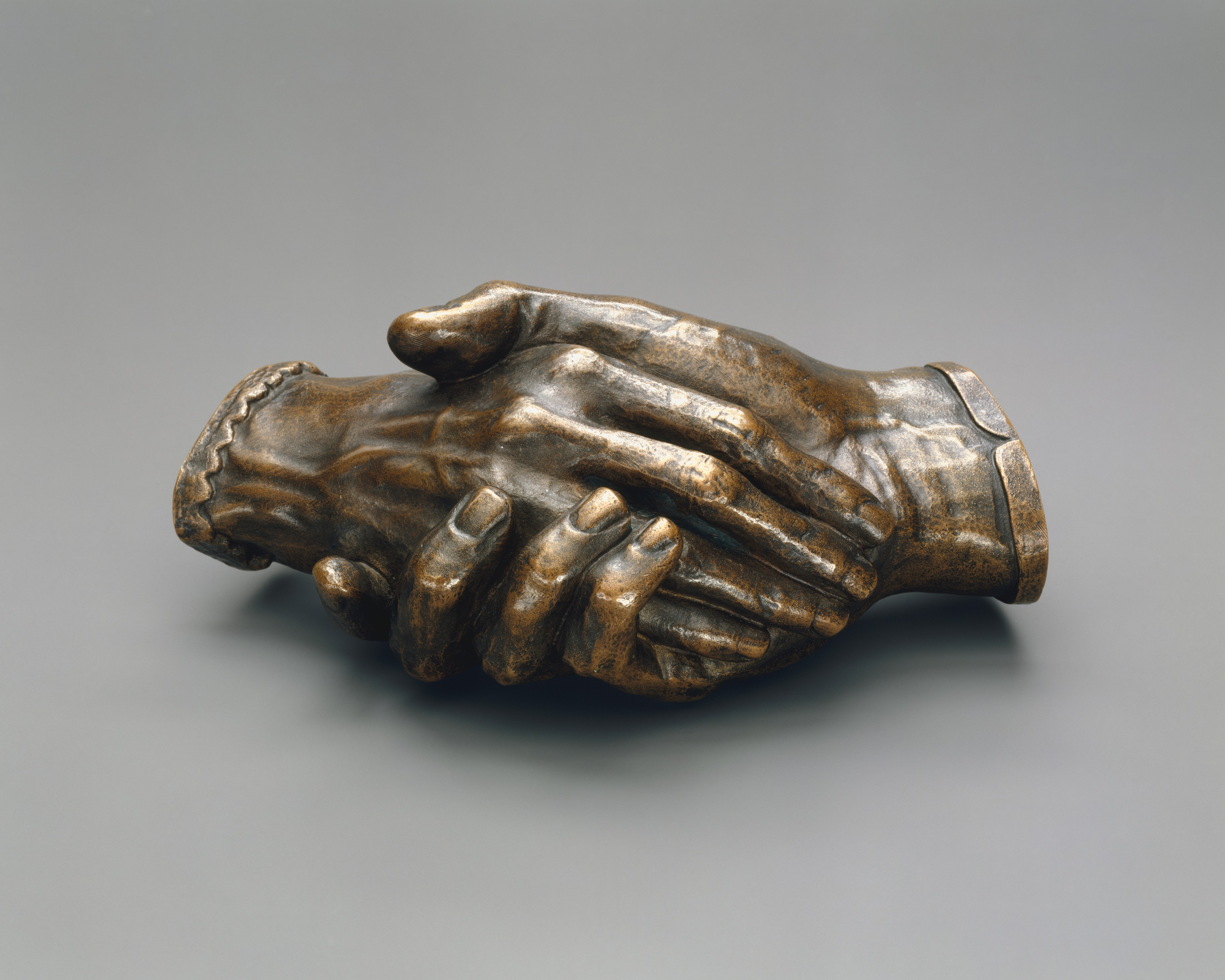
- Artist: Harriet Hosmer
- Year: 1853
- Collection: Metropolitan Museum of Art
- Identifiers: The Met object ID: 11156

Clasped Hands of Robert and Elizabeth Barrett Browning is an 1853 sculpture by Harriet Hosmer. Plaster casts are in the Schlesinger Library at Harvard University, and at the National Museum of Women in the Arts in Washington, D.C. As a bronze sculpture, versions are in the collection of the Metropolitan Museum of Art and in the "Cloister of the Clasped Hands" at Armstrong Browning Library, Baylor University.

== Early history and creation ==
Hosmer described the work's creation thus:

The history of the hands is very brief. In the winter of 1853, my second winter in Rome, I made the personal acquaintance of Mr and Mrs Browning. I then conceived the idea of casting their hands and asked Mrs Browning if she would consent. "Yes," she said "provided you will cast them but I will not sit for the formatore." Consequently I did the casting myself.

It was one of earliest works created that Hosmer created in Rome. First created in plaster, the work was only cast in bronze years later.

== Description and interpretation ==
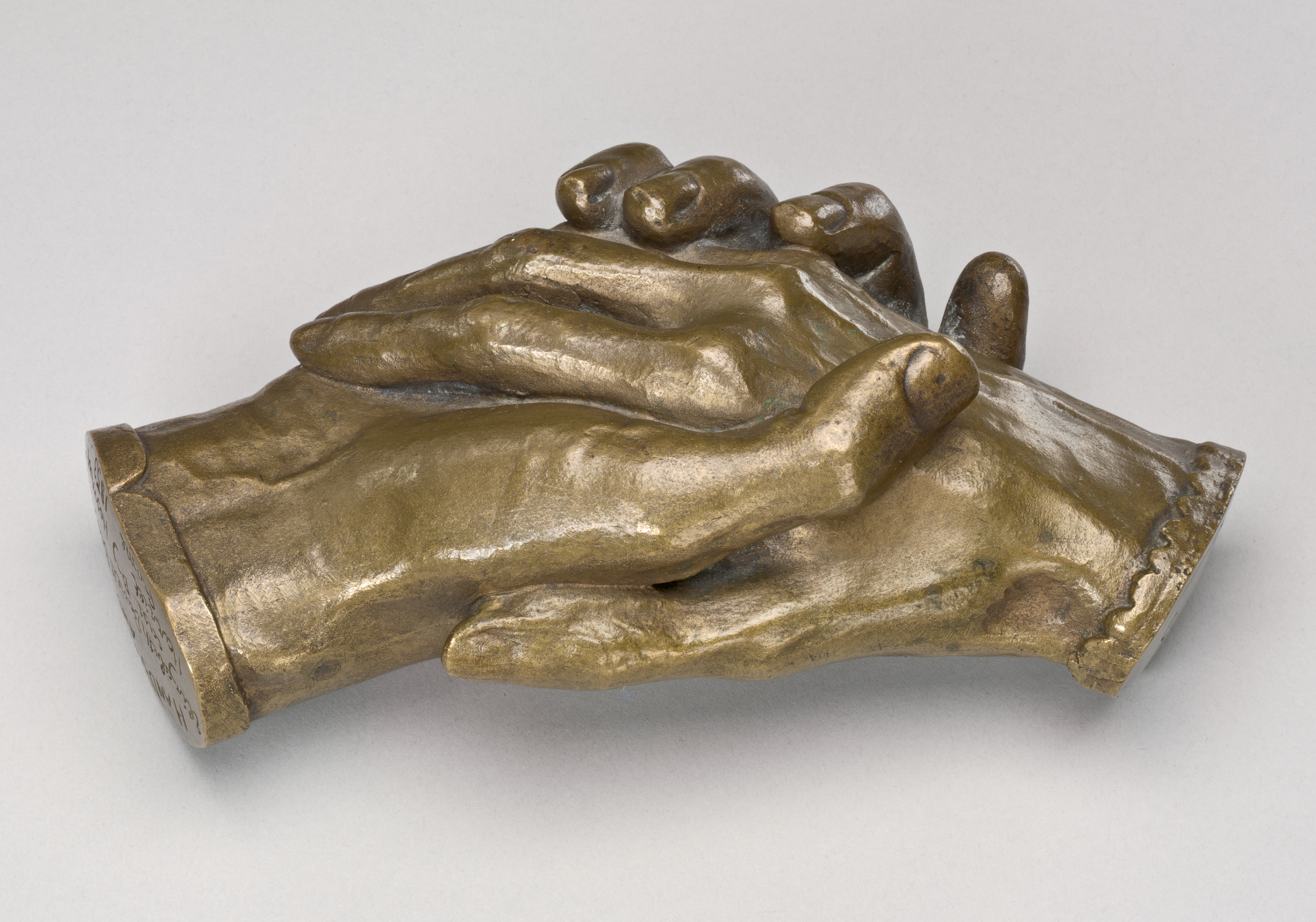
View from a different angle

The work directly depicts the clasped hands of Elizabeth Barrett Browning and Robert Browning, without other parts of the body. The artist Harriet Hosmer cast the hands of the poets herself at the request of Elizabeth Barrett Browning. The artist left the casting exactly as it came from the mold to preserve the textural quality of the casting and the lovers' sensitive physiognomy. The difference in size of the hands, as well as the cuff at each wrist, indicate the identity of each hand; and, although her hand is inside of his, hers is more visible, and there is a sense of equal partnership in the representation.

The signature of the artist is on end of Robert Barrett Browning's wrist and reads: HANDS - OF - ROBERT / AND / Elizabeth Barrett Browning / cast By / Harriet Hosmer / Rome 1853.

The work was in the same tradition as Hiram Powers' Loulie's Hand, and they were both inspired by contemporary Spiritualism.

== Later history and influence ==
Nathaniel Hawthorne alludes to the work in the 1860 novel The Marble Faun, as "Harriet Hosmer's Clasped Hands of Browning and his wife symbolize the individuality and heroic union of two highly poetic lives". Later in life, Hosmer commemorated the Brownings in some lines of poetry, "Parted by death we say... Yet hand in hand they hold their eternal way".
