= Hezekiah L. Hosmer =

American politician

Hezekiah Lord Hosmer
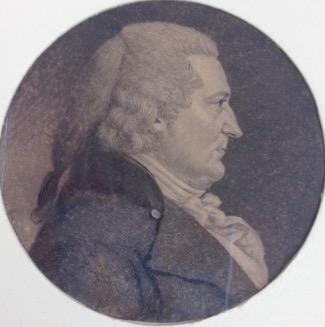

Personal details
- Born: June 7, 1765
- Died: June 9, 1814
- Profession: Lawyer, U.S. House Representative

Hezekiah Lord Hosmer (June 7, 1765 – June 9, 1814) was an American politician who was a United States representative from New York. Hosmer came from a prominent family; his father Titus Hosmer signed the Articles of Confederation for Connecticut, and Hosmer's brother Stephen became the Chief Justice of the Connecticut Supreme Court. Hezekiah studied law and was admitted to practice in the mayor's court of Hudson, New York. He was recorder of Hudson in 1793 and 1794, and was elected as a Federalist to the Fifth Congress, serving from March 4, 1797, to March 3, 1799. He was one of the impeachment managers appointed by the House of Representatives in 1798 to conduct the impeachment proceedings against Tennessee U.S. Senator William Blount.

Hosmer again served as recorder of Hudson in 1810, 1811, 1813, and 1814, and died in Hudson in 1814.

Hosmer married Susan Throop on November 30, 1805; they had 5 children including several who died in infancy. His posthumous son Hezekiah Lord Hosmer (1814–1893) was an author and the first Chief Justice of the Montana Territorial Court.

U.S. House of Representatives
Preceded by Ezekiel Gilbert	Member of the U.S. House of Representatives from New York's 6th congressional district 1797–1799	Succeeded by John Bird
