= USS Luna =

Liberty ship of WWII

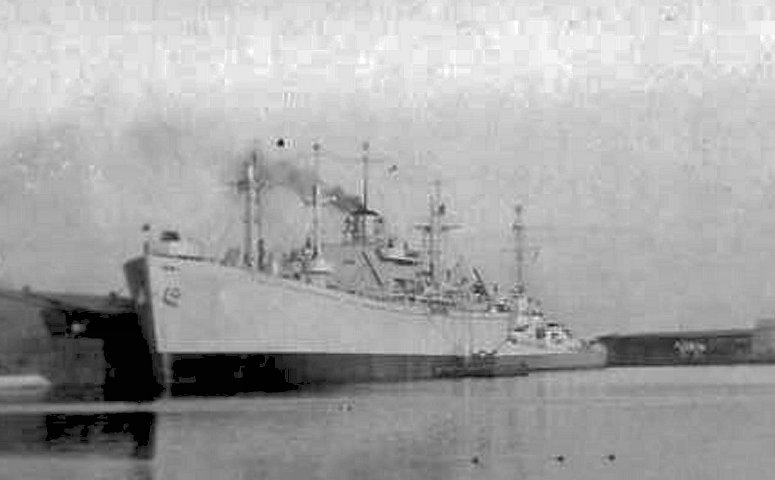
- USS Luna (AKS-7)

History

United States
- Name: Harriet Hosmer
- Namesake: Harriet Hosmer
- Owner: War Shipping Administration (WSA)
- Operator: Standard Fruit & Steamship Company
- Ordered: as type (EC2-S-C1) hull, MC hull 1528
- Builder: J.A. Jones Construction, Panama City, Florida
- Cost: $2,204,181
- Yard number: 10
- Way number: 4
- Laid down: 23 April 1943
- Launched: 30 September 1943
- Acquired: 25 October 1943
- Identification: Call Signal: KXLX
- Fate: Transferred to US Navy, 2 November 1943

United States
- Name: Luna
- Namesake: Luna
- Acquired: 2 November 1943
- Commissioned: 31 January 1944
- Decommissioned: 28 April 1946
- Reclassified: General Stores Issue Ship, AKS
- Identification: Hull symbol: AKS-7; Code letters: NAZB
- Fate: Laid up in National Defense Reserve Fleet, Suisun Bay Group, 21 May 1947; Sold for scrapping, 23 October 1964
- Notes: Name reverted to Harriet Hosmer when laid up in Reserve Fleet

General characteristics
- Class & type: Acubens-class General Stores Issue Ship
- Tonnage: 10,865 LT DWT; 7,176 GRT
- Displacement: 3,380 long tons (3,434 t) (light); 14,245 long tons (14,474 t) (max)
- Length: 441 feet 6 inches (135 m) oa; 416 feet (127 m) pp; 427 feet (130 m) lwl
- Beam: 57 feet (17 m)
- Draft: 27 ft 9.25 in (8.4646 m)
- Installed power: 2 × Oil fired 450 °F (232 °C) boilers, operating at 220 psi (1,500 kPa); 2,500 hp (1,900 kW)
- Propulsion: 1 × triple-expansion steam engine, (manufactured by Filer and Stowell, Milwaukee, Wisconsin); 1 × screw propeller
- Speed: 11.5 knots (21.3 km/h; 13.2 mph)
- Capacity: 562,608 cubic feet (15,931 m^{3}) (grain); 499,573 cubic feet (14,146 m^{3}) (bale)
- Complement: 195
- Armament: 1 × 5 in (127 mm) dual-purpose gun; 1 × 3 in (76 mm) dual-purpose; 8 × 20 mm (0.8 in) Oerlikon cannons

USS Luna (AKS-7) was a Liberty ship built in the United States during World War II. She was originally named for Harriet Hosmer, a neoclassical sculptor, considered the first female professional sculptor. She was converted shortly after completion to an Acubens-class general stores issue ship and renamed Luna, the Latin name for the Moon. She was responsible for delivering and disbursing goods and equipment to locations in the war zone.

== Construction ==
Harriet Hosmer was laid down 23 April 1943, under a Maritime Commission (MARCOM) contract, MC hull 1528, by J.A. Jones Construction, Panama City, Florida; she was launched 30 September 1943.

== Service history ==
Harriet Hosmer was allocated to the Standard Fruit & Steamship Company, on 25 October 1943, for transport to Tampa, Florida. Acquired by the Navy, 2 November 1943, she was converted by Tampa Shipbuilding Co.; renamed Luna 13 November 1943; and commissioned 31 January 1944.

Luna departed Norfolk, Virginia, 19 March 1944, passed through the Panama Canal, and arrived Pearl Harbor 15 April. After being assigned to ServRon 10, she sailed for her first issue area 19 April, and arrived Majuro Atoll, Marshall Islands, 27 April, to service units of the U.S. 5th Fleet. After a short voyage to Kwajalein, she proceeded to Eniwetok 3 June, and returned Pearl Harbor 8 July. She then steamed to Oakland, California, the 6th to reload at the Naval Supply Depot; this was to be her only return to the United States until after the war.

From 1944 to 1946, the ship continued servicing the U.S. 3rd Fleet and the U.S. 5th Fleet in the South Pacific. While at Ulithi, Caroline Islands, 24 October 1945, she assisted Viburnum who had struck a mine. After successfully completing seven issuing voyages and servicing 1,121 different ships, Luna was ordered to Tokyo Bay 25 September 1945, to load for the final voyage home.

== Post-war decommissioning ==
She arrived San Francisco, California, 28 December, and returned to Pearl Harbor, where she was decommissioned 28 April 1946. She was then towed back to San Francisco, and delivered back to MARCOM on 21 May 1947, and laid up in the National Defense Reserve Fleet, in the Suisun Bay Group. On 23 October 1964, she was sold, along with another ship, for $111,226 to Nicolai Joffe Corp., for scrapping. She was removed from the fleet on 2 November 1964.

== Military awards and honors ==
Luna's crew was eligible for the following medals:

- American Campaign Medal
- Asiatic-Pacific Campaign Medal
- World War II Victory Medal
- Navy Occupation Service Medal (with Asia clasp)

== Bibliography ==
- "Luna". Dictionary of American Naval Fighting Ships. Naval History and Heritage Command. This article incorporates text from this source, which is in the public domain.
- "Jones Construction, Panama City FL". www.ShipbuildingHistory.com. 13 October 2010.
- Maritime Administration. "Harriet Hosmer". Ship History Database Vessel Status Card. U.S. Department of Transportation, Maritime Administration.
- "SS Harriet Hosmer".
- "USS Luna (AKS-7)". NavSource. 21 November 2014.
