= George Hosmer =

American politician

George Hosmer (August 30, 1781 – March 6, 1861) was a American lawyer and politician.

== Biography ==
He was a son of surgeon Timothy Hosmer (born in Middletown, Connecticut, in 1740; died in Canandaigua, New York, in 1820). Timothy was a brother of Connecticut politician Titus Hosmer, and an officer in the Continental Army, serving throughout the American Revolutionary War, for two years and a half surgeon on Washington's staff. Timothy moved to Ontario County, New York, where his was one of the first two settlements in the wilderness. In 1798 he was appointed first judge of the county.

George Hosmer received a classical education, studied law, and, after practising a year in Canandaigua, moved to Avon, New York. During the War of 1812, he served on the western frontier.

George was elected district attorney of Livingston County in 1820. A member of the New York State Legislature in 1823-1825, he declined renomination, and resumed his legal practice.

His wife spoke several dialects of the Native Americans in the United States. Their son William Howe Cuyler Hosmer was a noted poet.
