= William Howe Cuyler Hosmer =

American poet

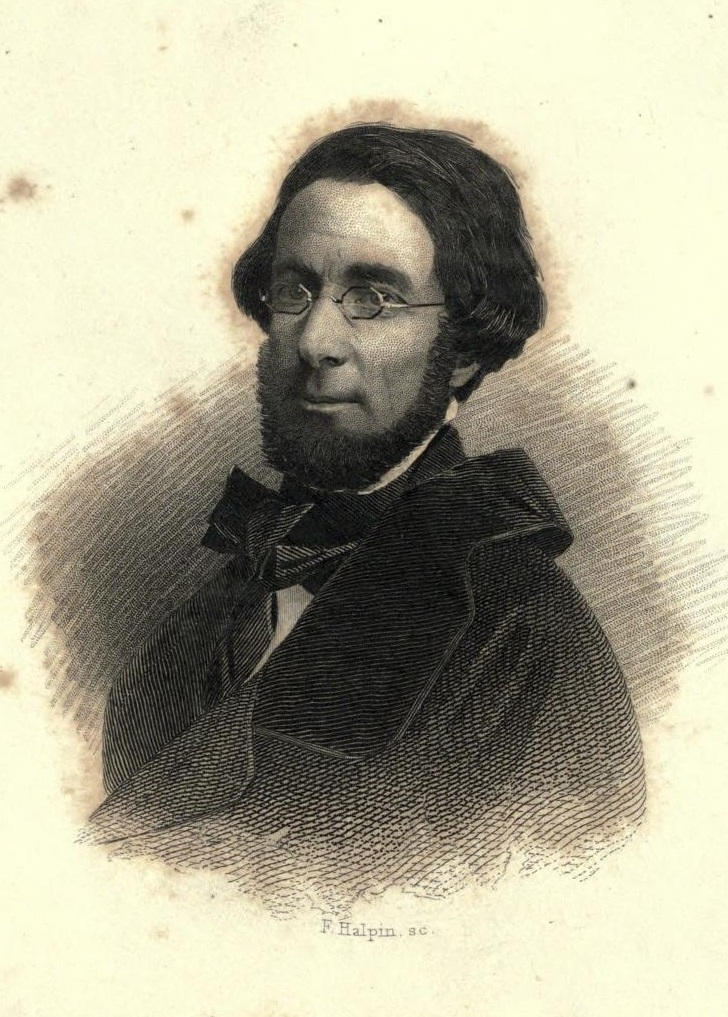
Circa 1855

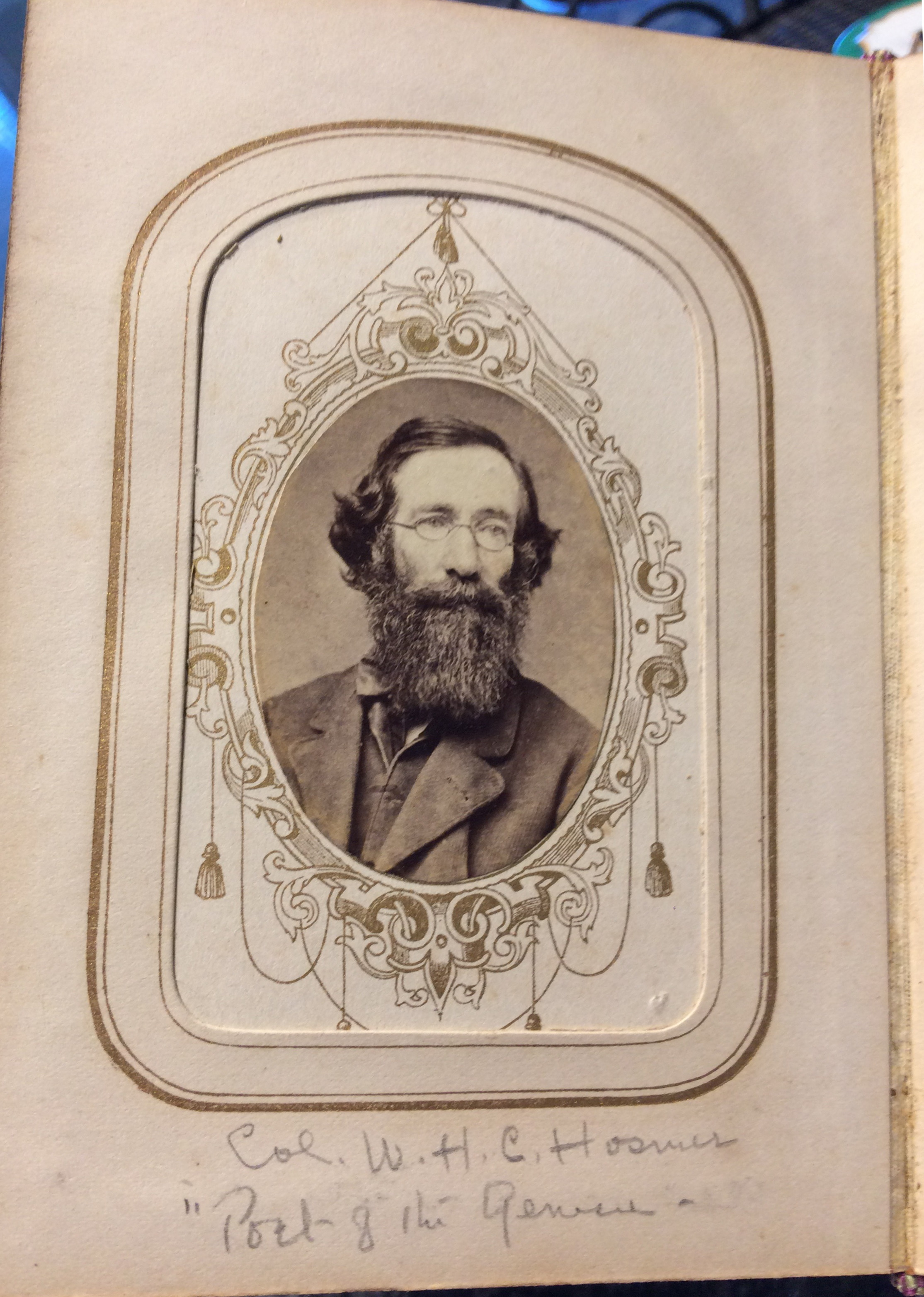
Portrait photo- Poet of the Genesee

William Howe Cuyler Hosmer or William H. C. Hosmer (May 25, 1814 – May 23, 1877) was an American poet.

He was a cousin of sculptor Harriet Hosmer and tragic actress Jean Hosmer.

== Biography ==
Hosmer was born in Avon, New York, as the son of lawyer George Hosmer. He graduated at the University of Vermont in 1841, studied law, and became a master in chancery at Avon. In 1854, he was appointed clerk in the New York City Custom House. He was a student of the character and lore of the Native Americans in the United States, and traveled extensively among the tribes of Florida and Wisconsin.

Hosmer's lengthy narrative poem Yonnondio, or the Warriors of Genesee may have inspired or informed a short poem of the same name by Walt Whitman.

== Literary works ==
- The Fall of Tecumseh, a drama (Avon, 1830)
- The Themes of Song (Rochester, 1834)
- The Pioneers of Western New York (Boston, 1838)
- The Months (1847)
- Yonnondio, or the Warriors of Genesee (New York, 1844)
- Bird-Notes (1850)
- Indian Traditions and Songs (1850)
- Legend of the Senecas (1850)
- Poetical Works, a collection of the above-listed works (2 vols., 1854)
