= Jean Hosmer =

American actress

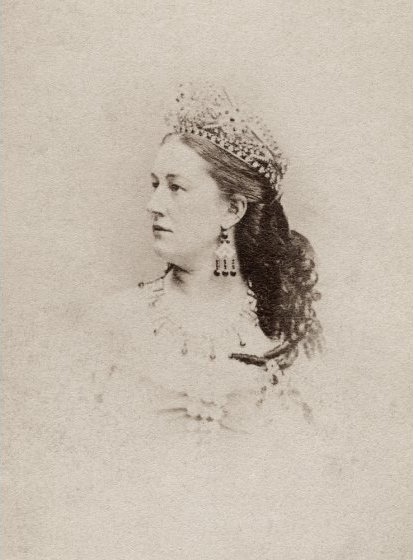
- Carte-de-visite, circa 1865
- Born: January 29, 1842 near Boston, Massachusetts, United States
- Died: January 29, 1890 (aged 48); Buffalo, New York, United States
- Occupation: Actress

Jean Haskell Hosmer (January 29, 1842 – January 29, 1890) was an American actress and tragedienne who reached the zenith of her career directly following the American Civil War, and is associated through her career with actor and Lincoln assassin John Wilkes Booth along his brother Edwin Booth.

Hosmer was a cousin of sculptor Harriet Hosmer and of poet William H. C. Hosmer.

== Early life ==
Born in 1842, near Boston, Massachusetts, Hosmer and her family moved to near Buffalo, New York, when she was four years old. At the age of eight, Hosmer's desire to act was stimulated by witnessing a performance of Douglas Jerrold's play Black-Eyed Susan. Hosmer soon after fell ill with an unknown disease which was attributed to her intense excitement for the production. Upon her recovery she continued to visit the theatre despite her parents' objections, often dressed in boys' clothes. She attended the Genesee and Wyoming Seminary in Alexander, New York, for a short time but remained committed to having a career on the stage. Her parents, influenced by her father's failings in business, eventually gave their consent so long as she performed under a stage name.

== Career ==
=== Early career ===
Under the stage name "Miss Jennie Stanley," Hosmer began her career in Buffalo doing ballet at the age of 15. At the age of 16, under the tutelage of actor Barton Hill, she gained her first speaking role at the Metropolitan Theatre and was soon promoted to member of the theater's stock company. In 1860, while a leading actress, the young Hosmer was noticed by McVicker's Theater in Chicago and was recruited by the playhouse for its company. She performed with the company there under the name "Miss Jean Stanley" for two years supporting the Booth brothers.

=== Rise to stardom ===
After leaving McVicker's, Hosmer moved on her own to Philadelphia to star at the Chestnut Street Theatre in Philadelphia, Pennsylvania, under her own name. In 1863, she made her mark at the Chestnut playing strong, tragic female characters in plays such as Macbeth, Camille, and Romeo and Juliet. The death of one of her sisters in that same year prompted Hosmer to take a break from acting, but after two years reappeared for her starring tour. On May 29, 1865, she opened in New York at the Winter Garden Theatre on Broadway as Camille in Camille to glowing reviews, and stayed in New York until July 7. In announcing her farewell week there, the Spirit of the Times wrote:

The current is the sixth and positively last week of the brilliantly successful engagement of Miss Hosmer at this house. I say brilliant both in an artistic and financial point of view, for rarely, if ever, has an artiste achieved a more legitimate and well-merited artistic success or been rewarded with a more substantial one as soon as her unqestionable genius became known to the play-going public. I regard Miss Hosmer's engagement as one of the most extraordinary in every way that has been played in this city for many years. She came among us unheralded and unpuffed; content, it would seem, to rely on her own intrinsic merits, and stand or fall by the freely-expressed opinion of her auditors and the critical acumen of the press. To triumph over the former was an easy task; to win the good opinion of the latter, one of great difficulty.

=== Decline ===
Following the close of the New York show in 1865, Hosmer's career began to decline. In 1866, she returned to Philadelphia to play at Arch Street Theatre with McKee Rankin, but left after a short while. Bad personal habits began to affect her work, and she likely suffered from alcoholism which became more noticeable in her acting as she aged. This was noted by English theater critic Clement Scott during an 1878 production of Lucrezia Borgia:

There were moments when I felt almost paralyzed by her acting. I never saw the spirit of such intense tragedy in a woman. But as the performance wore on she became indistinct, reckless and uncertain, and when the curtain went down she was thoroughly drunk.

During the 1870s and 1880s, Hosmer was considered semi-retired from the stage and now taught acting and elocution. However, in order to further sustain herself, she continued to irregularly act in productions with small-town and amateur companies across the country.

== Death ==
In the winter of 1889–90, Hosmer took a job acting with the small Ramage's Standard Theatre company playing in Midwestern towns. While at a production in a small town near Cleveland, Ohio, she suddenly began to severely hemorrhage. Hosmer was quickly sent to her sister's home in Buffalo, where she died in obscurity on her birthday of January 29. She was 48 years old.

== Legacy ==
=== Association with the Booths ===
At McVicker's, Hosmer appeared in supporting roles to John Wilkes Booth and his brother Edwin. Of John, Hosmer later remarked:

I consider him a greater actor than his brother. He better represented the genius of his father, the first Junius Brutus Booth, and he played with such fire and vigor that he made us in his company actually fear him. But he did not have the refinement, grace, and crystal clearness of elocution possessed by Edwin.

While supporting Wilkes Booth, Hosmer kept a lock of his hair and held onto it following her departure from Chicago. Following his death, Hosmer sent the lock of hair to his mother, Mary Ann Holmes Booth.
