= Harriet Hosmer =

American sculptor (1830–1908)

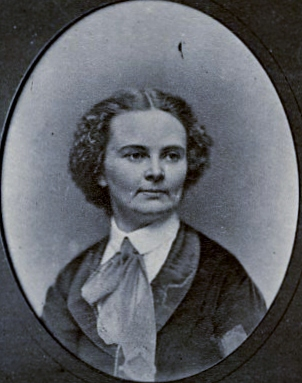
- Born: October 9, 1830; Watertown, Massachusetts, U.S.
- Died: February 21, 1908 (aged 77); Watertown, Massachusetts, U.S.
- Known for: Sculpture
- Movement: Neoclassicism
- Partner: Louisa Baring

Signature
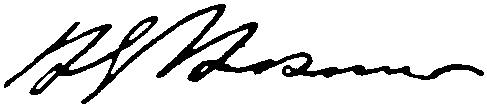

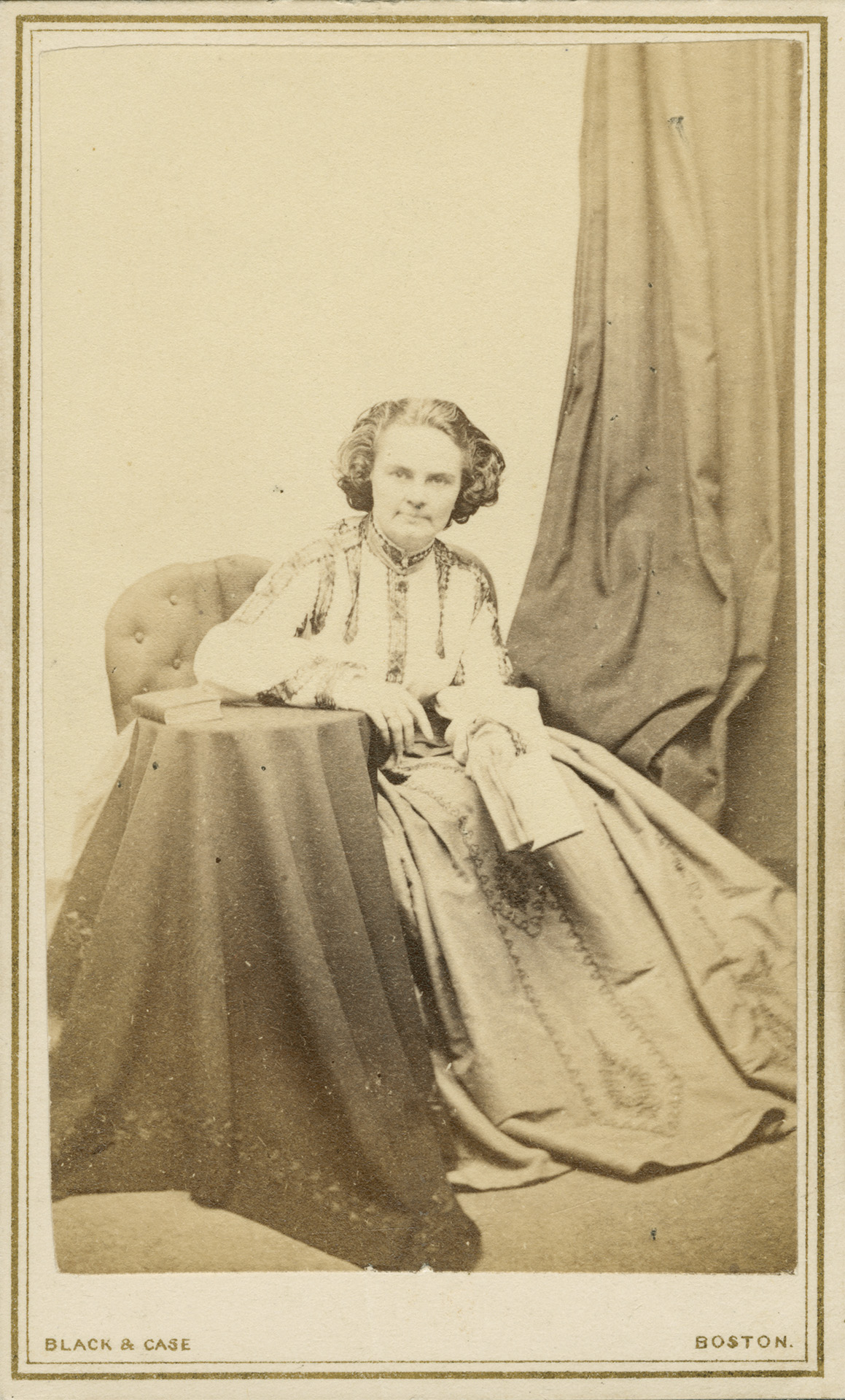
Harriet Goodhue Hosmer, 1865, albumen print (carte-de-visite) by Black & Case

Harriet Goodhue Hosmer (October 9, 1830 – February 21, 1908) was an American neoclassical sculptor, considered the most distinguished female sculptor in America during the 19th century. She is known as the first female professional sculptor. Among other technical innovations, she pioneered a process for turning limestone into marble. Hosmer once lived in an expatriate colony in Rome, befriending many prominent writers and artists.

She was a cousin of poet William H. C. Hosmer and tragic actress Jean Hosmer.

== Biography ==
=== Early life and education ===
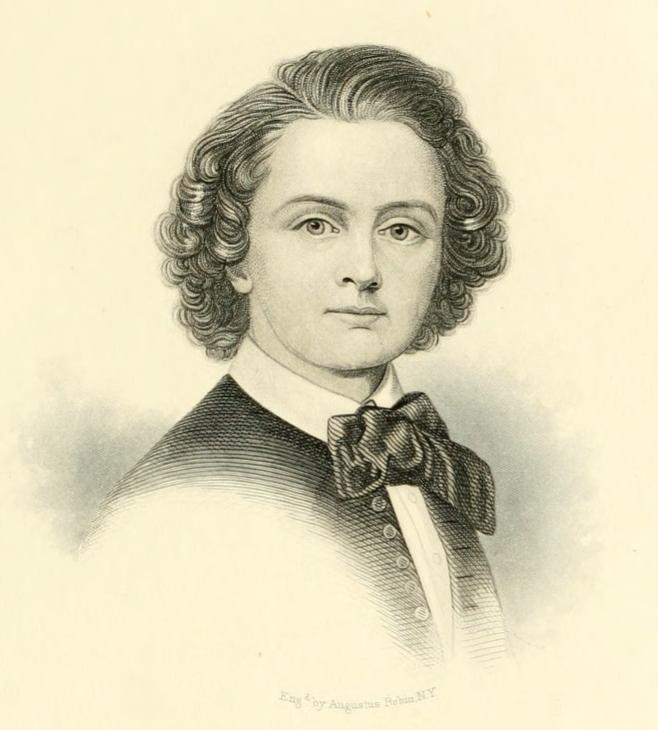
Harriet Hosmer, engraving by Augustus Robin (1873)

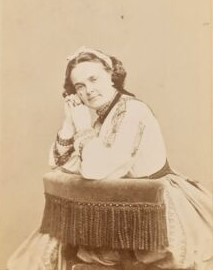
Harriet Hosmer, sculpturer, carte de visite c.1865

Harriet Hosmer was born on October 9, 1830, at Watertown, Massachusetts, and completed a course of study at Sedgewick School in Lenox, Massachusetts. Her mother, Sarah Grant Hosmer, and three siblings died during her childhood. As a child, she was encouraged by her father, physician Hiram Hosmer, to pursue a course of physical training by which she became expert in rowing, skating, and riding. He also encouraged her artistic passion. She traveled alone in the wilderness of the western United States, and visited the Dakota Indians.

She showed an early aptitude for modeling, and studied anatomy with her father. Through the influence of family friend Wayman Crow she attended the anatomical instruction of Dr. Joseph Nash McDowell at the Missouri Medical College (then the medical department of the state university). She then studied in Boston and practiced modeling at home until November 1852, when, with her father and her lover Charlotte Cushman, she went to Rome, where from 1853 to 1860 she was the pupil of the Welsh sculptor John Gibson, and she was finally allowed to study live models.

When Hosmer knew herself to be a sculptor, she knew also that in America was no school for her. She must leave home, she must live where art could live. She might model her busts in clay of her own soil, but who should follow out in marble the delicate thought which the clay expressed? The workmen of Massachusetts tended the looms, built the railroads, and read the newspapers. The hard-handed men of Italy worked in marble from the designs put before them; one copied the leaves which the sculptor threw into the wreaths around the brows of his heroes; another turned with the tool the folds of the drapery; another wrought up the delicate tissues of the flesh; none of them dreamed of ideas - they were copyists - the very hand-work that her head needed. And to Italy she went...

— Maria Mitchell, c. 1857

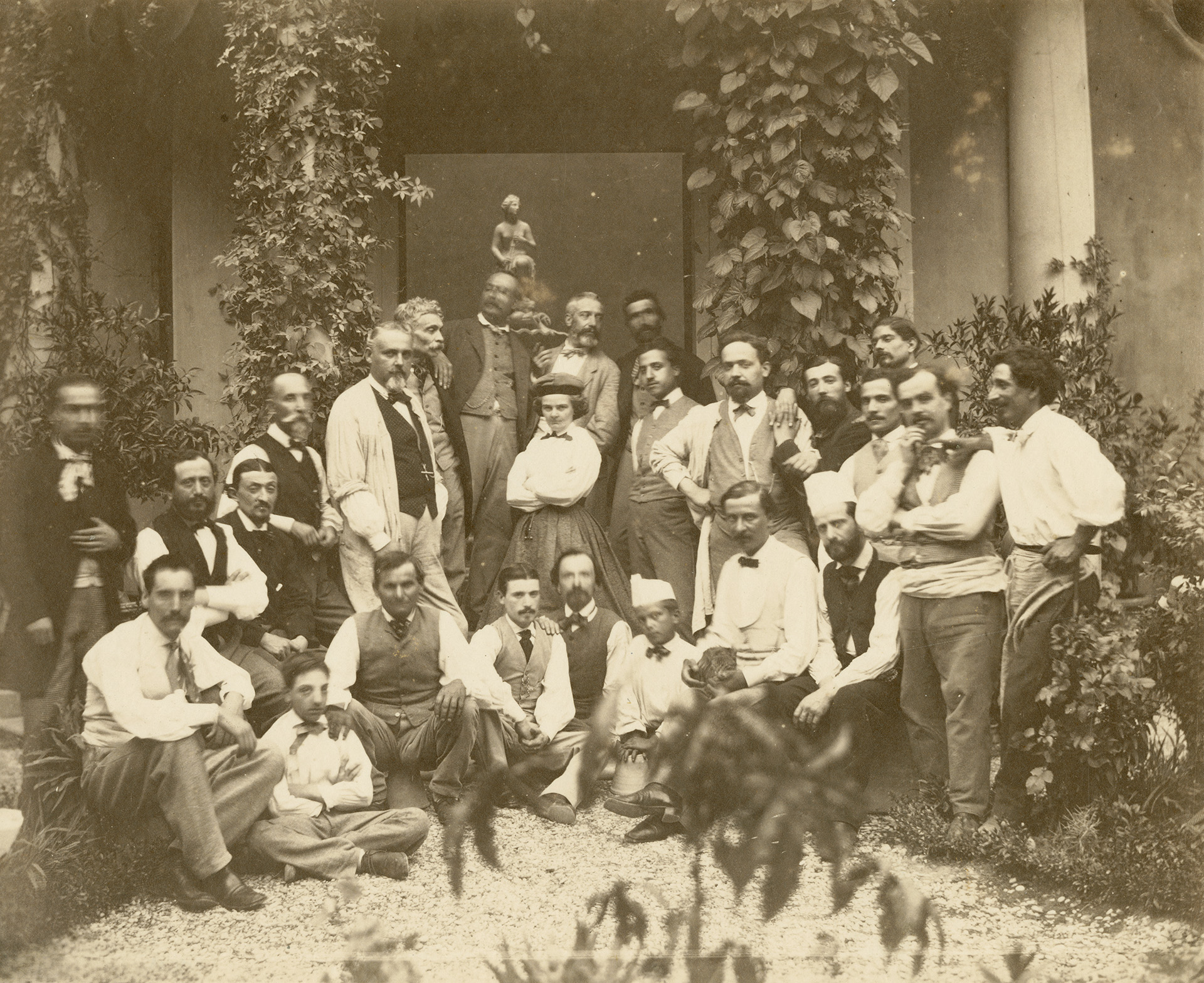
Harriet Goodhue Hosmer with her assistants and carvers in the courtyard of her studio in Rome (1867)

=== Rome ===
While living in Rome, she associated with a colony of artists and writers that included Nathaniel Hawthorne, William Makepeace Thackeray, the philosopher and feminist Frances Power Cobbe and the two female Georges, Eliot and Sand. When in Florence, she was frequently the guest of Elizabeth Barrett and Robert Browning at Casa Guidi.

She was very peculiar, but she seemed to be her actual self, and nothing affected or made up; so that, for my part, I gave her full leave to wear what may suit her best, and to behave as her inner woman prompts.

— Nathaniel Hawthorne, c. 1858

The artists included Anne Whitney, Emma Stebbins, Edmonia Lewis, Louisa Lander, Margaret Foley, Florence Freeman, and Vinnie Ream. Hawthorne was clearly describing these in his novel The Marble Faun, and Henry James called them a "sisterhood of American ‘lady sculptors'." Hosmer is credited with having 'led the flock' of other female sculptors. Frances Power Cobbe argued that the case of Hosmer showed that women could be creative artistic geniuses, just as much as men, and that Hosmer's work was pioneering a new women's art that celebrated female strength and power.

=== Artistic style ===
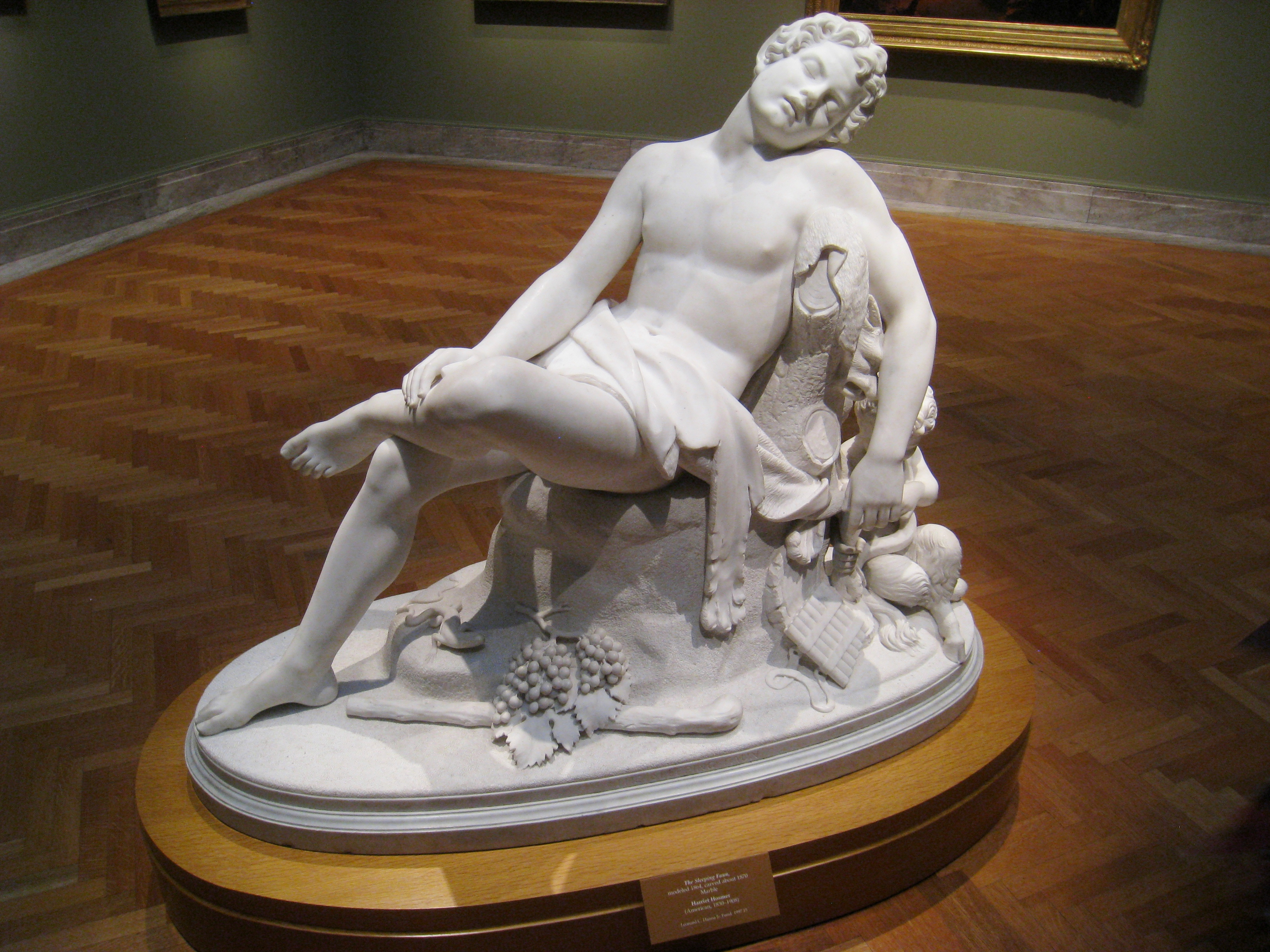
The Sleeping Faun was created in 1865 in Rome, and was one of Hosmer's most celebrated works.

Hosmer was drawn to the Neoclassical style, which was easy to study given her presence in Rome. She enjoyed studying mythology, and she created various representations of mythological icons, such as the sculpture of The Sleeping Faun, which includes intricate details of elements such as his hair, the grapes, and the cloth draped over him.

=== Later life ===
She also designed and constructed machinery, and devised new processes, especially in connection with sculpture, such as a method of converting the ordinary limestone of Italy into marble, and a process of modeling in which the rough shape of a statue is first made in plaster, on which a coating of wax is laid for working out the finer forms.

Hosmer later lived in Chicago and Terre Haute, Indiana.

Hosmer exhibited her sculpture of Queen Isabella, commissioned by the Queen Isabella Association, in the California State Building at the 1893 World's Columbian Exposition in Chicago, Illinois. The statue was exhibited again in 1894 at the California Midwinter International Exposition.

For 25 years she was romantically involved with Louisa, Lady Ashburton, widow of Bingham Baring, 2nd Baron Ashburton (died 1864). Lady Ashburton provided Harriet a studio close to the Ashburton home in Knightsbridge, London.

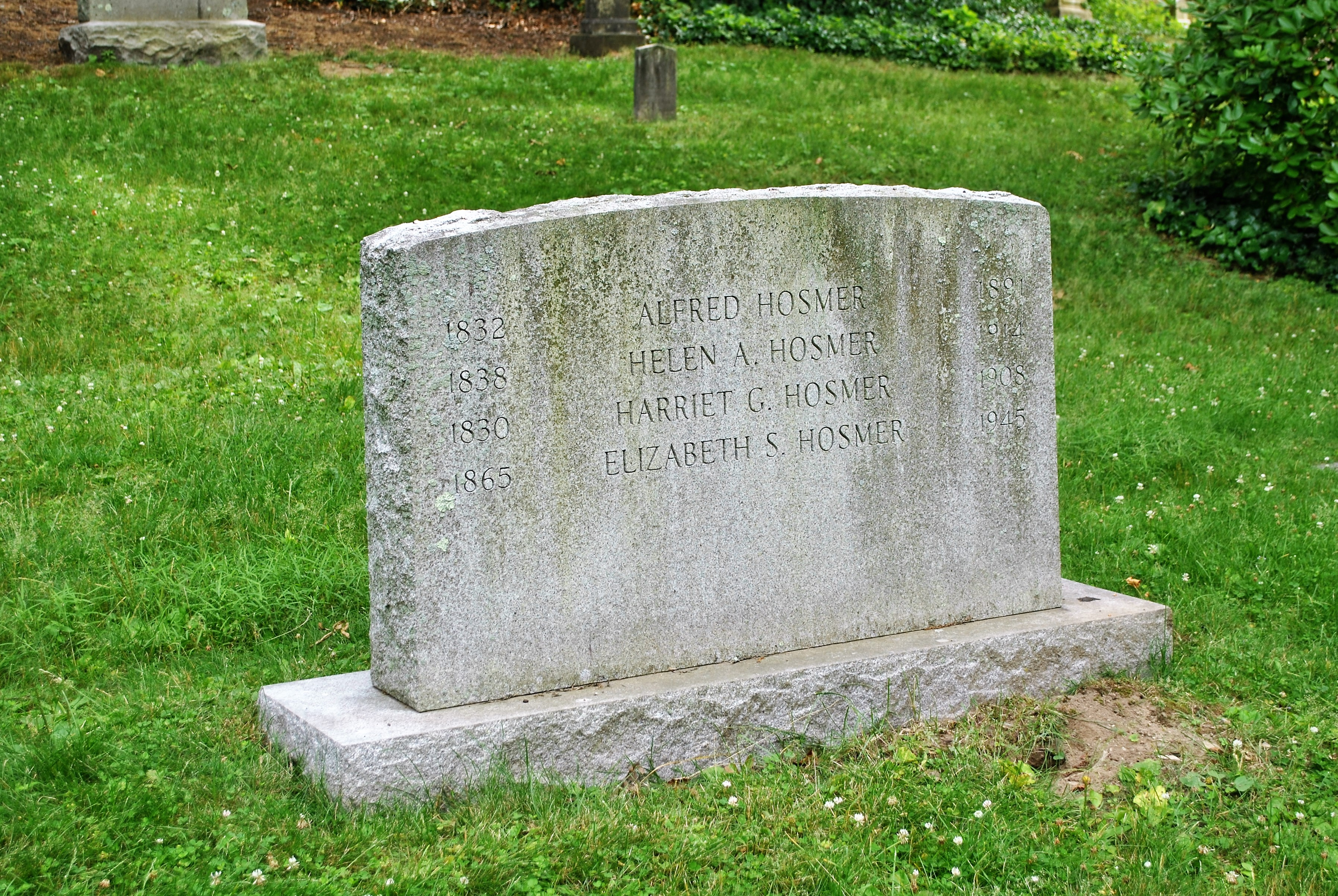
Mount Auburn Cemetery, Cambridge, MA

Hosmer died at Watertown, Massachusetts, on February 21, 1908, and is buried in the family plot at Mount Auburn Cemetery, Cambridge. Aside from the work she produced, Harriet Hosmer made her mark on art history and feminist and gender studies. As the National Museum of Women in the Arts put it, "Harriet Goodhue Hosmer defied 19th-century social convention by becoming a successful sculptor of large scale, Neoclassical works in marble."

== Context ==
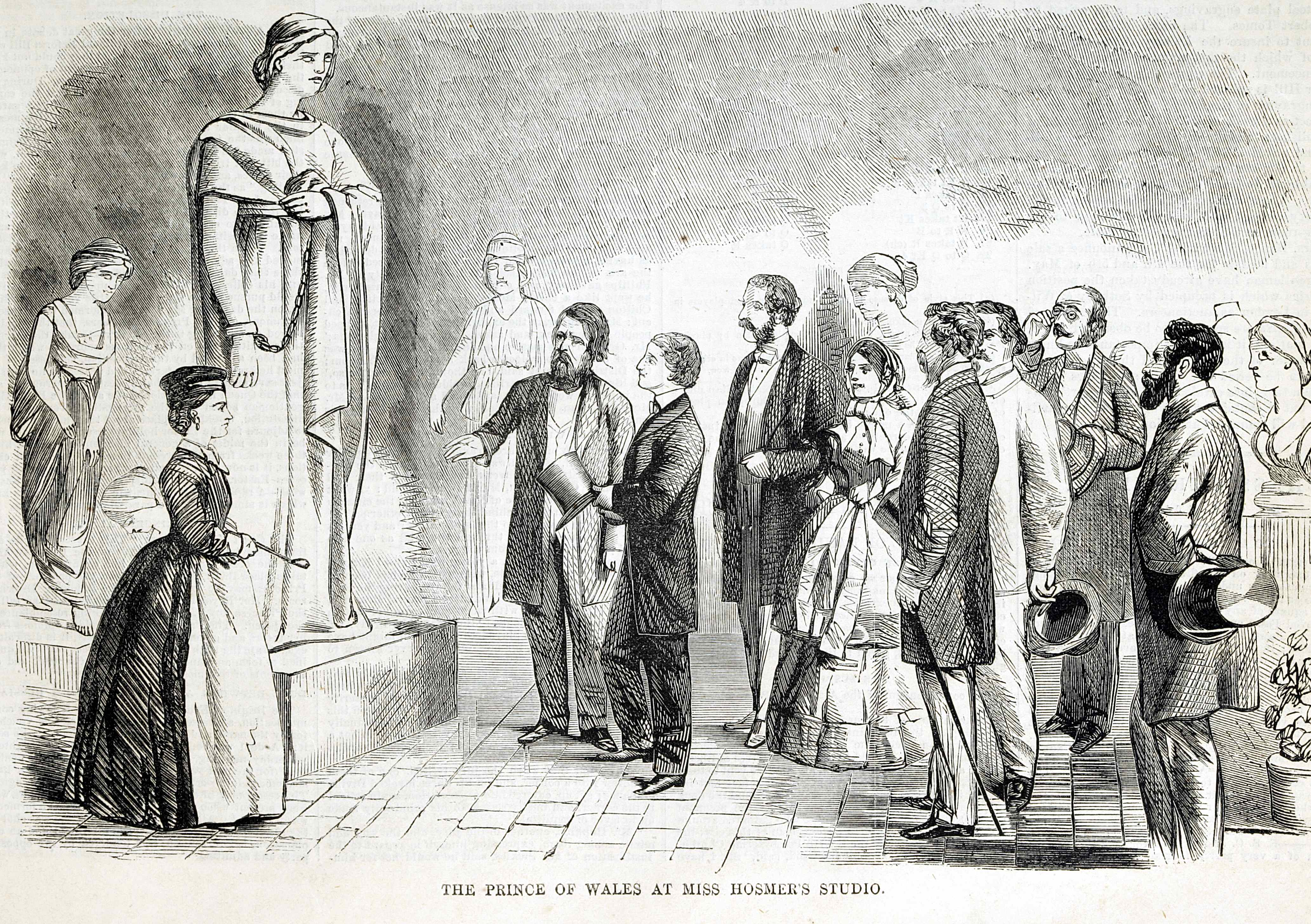
Illustration of the Prince of Wales visiting Hosmer's studio

In the 19th century women did not usually have careers, especially careers as sculptors. Women were not allowed to have the same art education as men, they were not trained in the making "great" art such as large history paintings, mythological and biblical scenes, modeling of figure. Women usually produced artwork that could be done in their home, such as still lives, portraits, landscapes, and small scale carvings, although even Queen Victoria allowed her daughter, the Princess Louise, to study sculpture.

Hosmer was not allowed to attend art classes because working from a live model was forbidden for women, but she took classes in anatomy to learn the human form and paid for private sculpture lessons. The biggest career move she made was moving to Rome to study art. Hosmer owned her own studio and ran her own business. She became a well-known artist in Rome, and received several commissions.

Hosmer commented on her break from tradition by saying "I honor every woman who has strength enough to step outside the beaten path when she feels that her walk lies in another; strength enough to stand up and be laughed at, if necessary."

== Legacy ==
Mount Hosmer, near Lansing, Iowa is named after Hosmer; she won a footrace to the summit of the hill during a steamboat layover during the 1850s.

During World War II the Liberty ship SS Harriet Hosmer was built in Panama City, Florida, and named in her honor.

A book of poetry, Waking Stone: Inventions on the Life Of Harriet Hosmer, by Carole Simmons Oles, was published in 2006.

Her sculpture, Puck and Owl, is featured on the Boston Women's Heritage Trail.

The Hosmer School in Watertown, Massachusetts is a public elementary school. It was built on land donated by Harriet's father, Dr. Hiram Hosmer. The school was originally dedicated to both Hiram and Harriet's cousin Dr. Alfred Hosmer in honor of their years of service to the community. On February 1, 2022, to mark the occasion of the opening of the newly renovated school, the town of Watertown rededicated the building to include Harriet. From the rededication ceremony; "This change is not to exclude, demote, nor snub the Doctors Hiram and Alfred Hosmer, rightly honored for their combined decades of service to the town, but rather to include Harriet, internationally famous even in her own time when women had fewer outlets for publicly acknowledged accomplishments. Harriet was present for the dedication of the first building, named for her father and her cousin. It is time she is equally recognized."

== Selected works ==
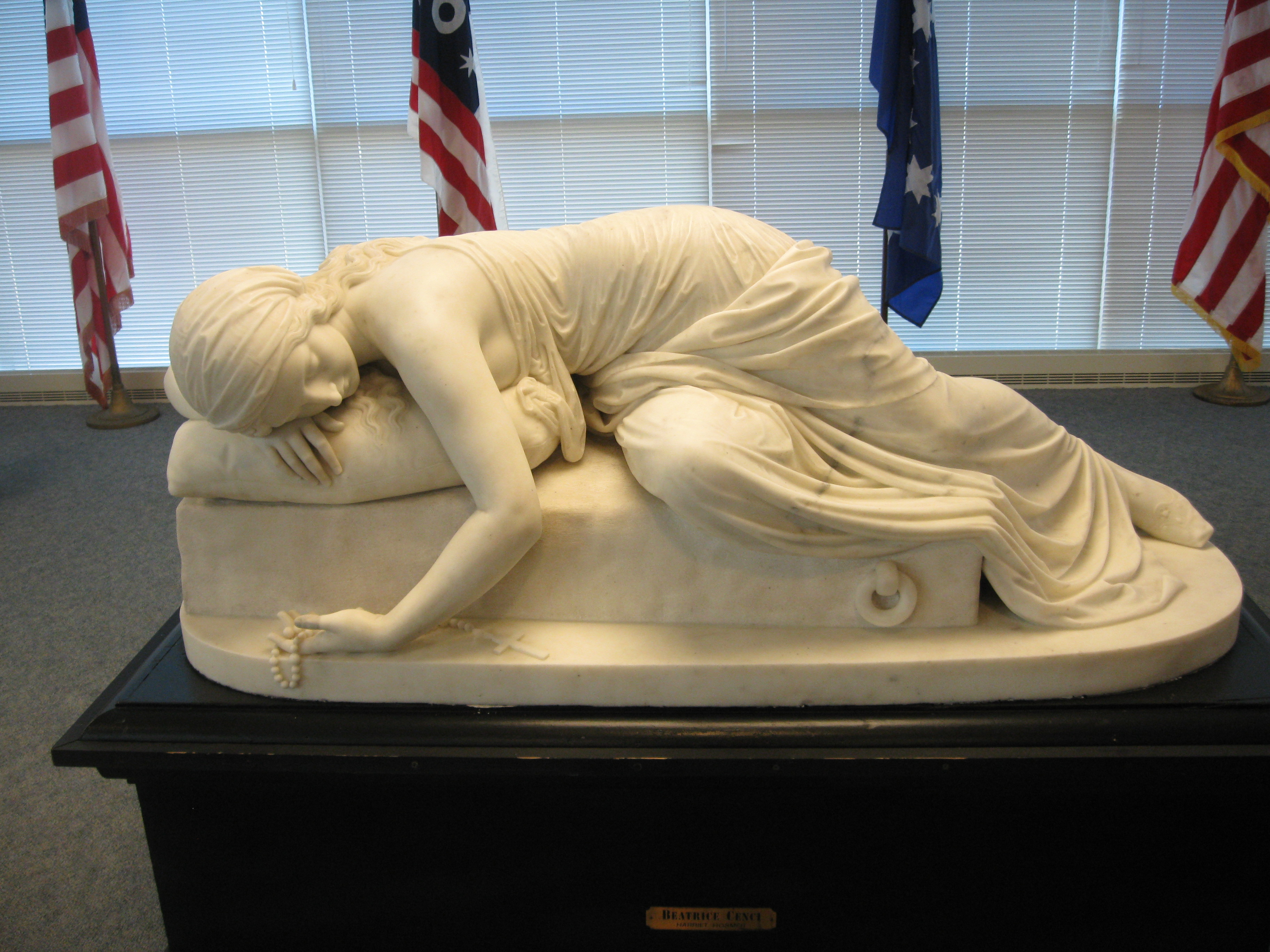
Beatrice Cenci, 1857, Saint Louis Mercantile Library

Hosmer made both large and small scale works and also produced work to specific order. Her smaller works were frequently issued in multiples to accommodate demand. Among her most popular were 'Beatrice Cenci', which exists in several versions.

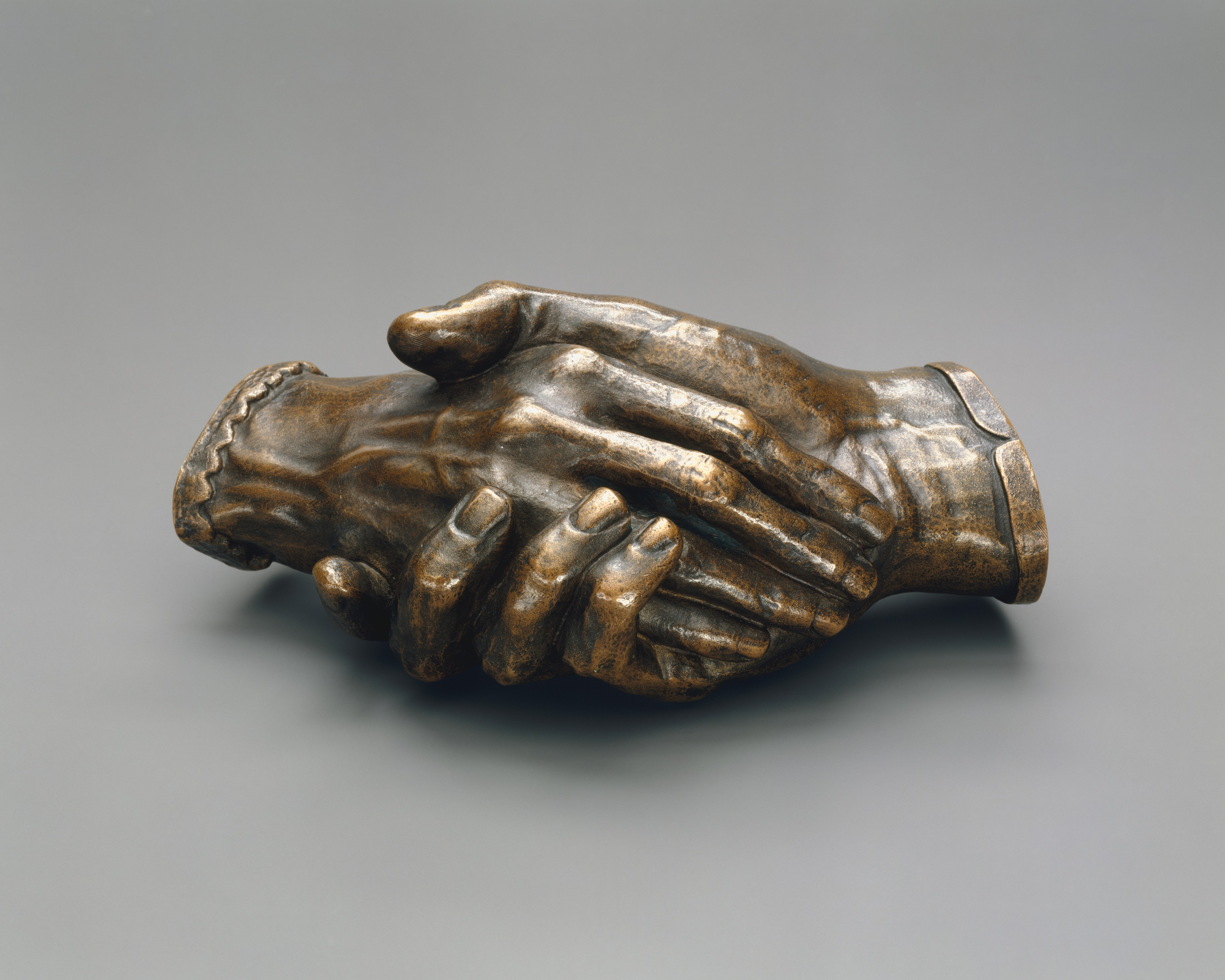
Clasped Hands of Robert and Elizabeth Barrett Browning, 1853, Metropolitan Museum of Art, New York

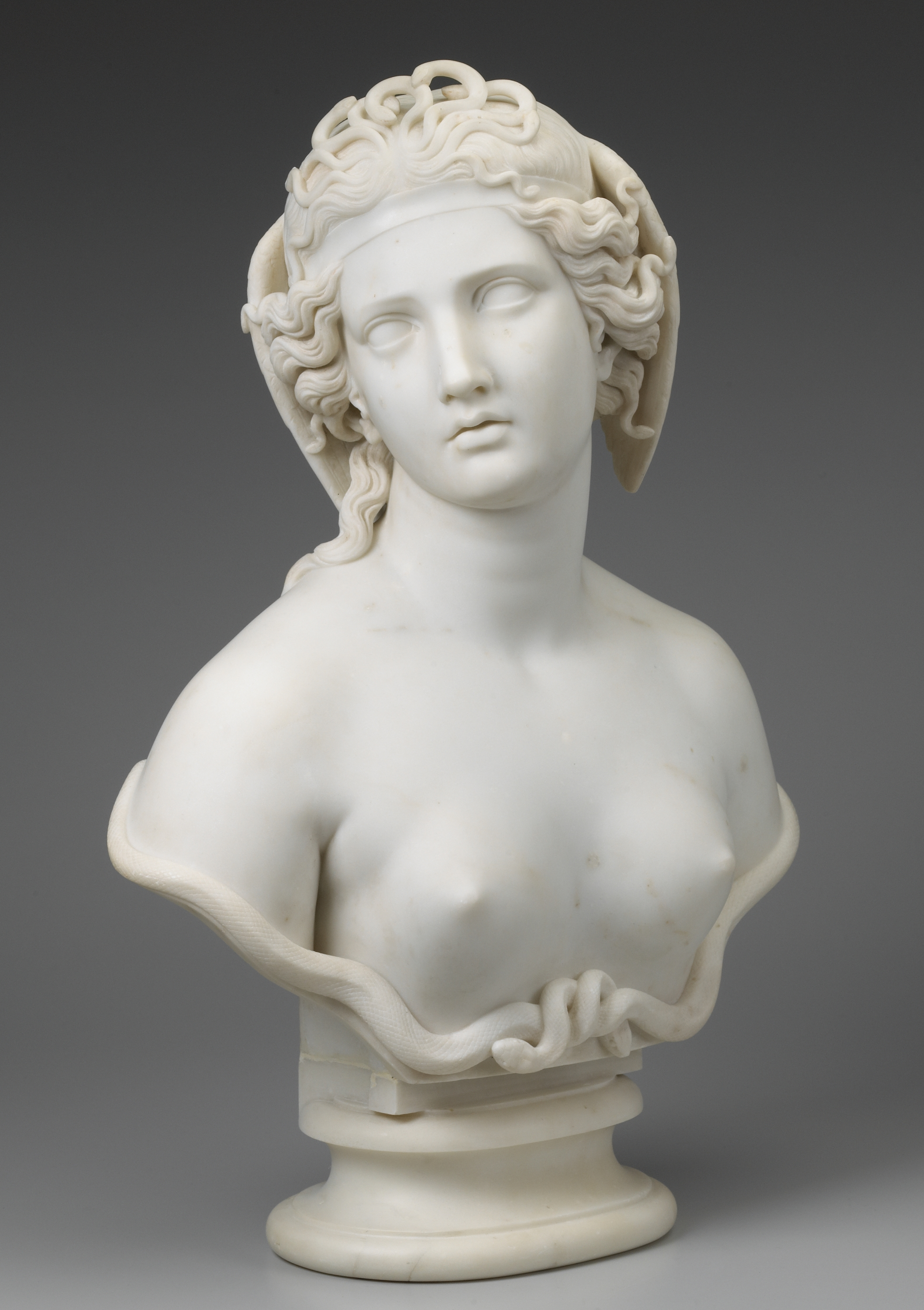
Medusa, c. 1854, Minneapolis Institute of Art

- Hesper, The Evening Star, her first original sculpture (1852)
- Doctor McDowell, a portrait of a man who had a great impact on Hosmer's professional life (1852)
- Clasped Hands of Robert and Elizabeth Barrett Browning (1853)
- Daphne and Medusa, ideal heads (1853)
- Puck (1855), a spirited and graceful conception which she copied for the Prince of Wales, the Duke of Hamilton and others
- Oenone (1855), her first life-sized figure, now in the Saint Louis Art Museum
- Will-O-The-Wisp, three known variations (1856, 1858, 1864)
- Beatrice Cenci (1857), which exists in several versions, including one in the St. Louis Mercantile Library and one in the Art Gallery of New South Wales
- Lady Constance Talbot, "the only known Hosmer medallion that is a bas relief portrait of a woman" (1857)
- Tomb of Judith Faconnet, the first American-made artwork that is now permanently installed in Sant'Andrea della Fratte (1857 - 1858)
- The Fountain of the Hylas and the Water Nymphs (1858)
- Zenobia in Chains (1859), which exists in several versions, full-sized, reduced, and in bust
- The Fountain of the Siren, her most well known fountain design (1861)
- Thomas Hart Benton, the first public monument in the state of Missouri (1862)
- Gate for an Art Gallery (1864)
- A Sleeping Faun (1865) is now being displayed at the Museum of Fine Arts, Boston. Another version is in Iveagh House, Dublin, see Homan Potterton, 'An American Sculpture at the Dublin Exhibition of 1865: Hariet Hosmer's Sleeping Faun', The Arts in Ireland Autumn 1973.
- Portrait of Wayman Crow (1866), John Gibson (1866)
- A Waking Faun; a bronze statue of Thomas H. Benton (1866 - 1867) for Lafayette Park, St. Louis. It was created as a companion to "The Sleeping Faun".
- Lincoln Memorial, sometimes known as "Freedmen's Monument" (1867 - 1868)
- Queen of Naples, "the second of the three full size statues of celebrated female sovereigns Hosmer chose to represent over the course of her career" (1868)
- Sentinel of Pompeii (1878)
- Crerar Lincoln Memorial - The African Sibyl, made in attempt to win a Lincoln Memorial competition (1888 - 1896)
- Bronze gates for the Earl of Brownlow's art gallery at Ashridge Hall.
- The Staghound, commissioned by the Empress of Austria
- Dolphin Fountain (1892), the male companion to Hosmer's The Mermaid's Cradle, Hosmer's only remaining complete fountain (1892 - 1893)
- Queen Isabella of Castile, Hosmer's last known completed work that was commissioned by the Daughters of Isabella (1893)
- An alternate Emancipation Memorial—designed but not constructed
- Statues of the queen of Naples as the heroine of Gaeta, and of Queen Isabella of Spain for the Columbian Exposition, Chicago, 1893.

== Gallery ==
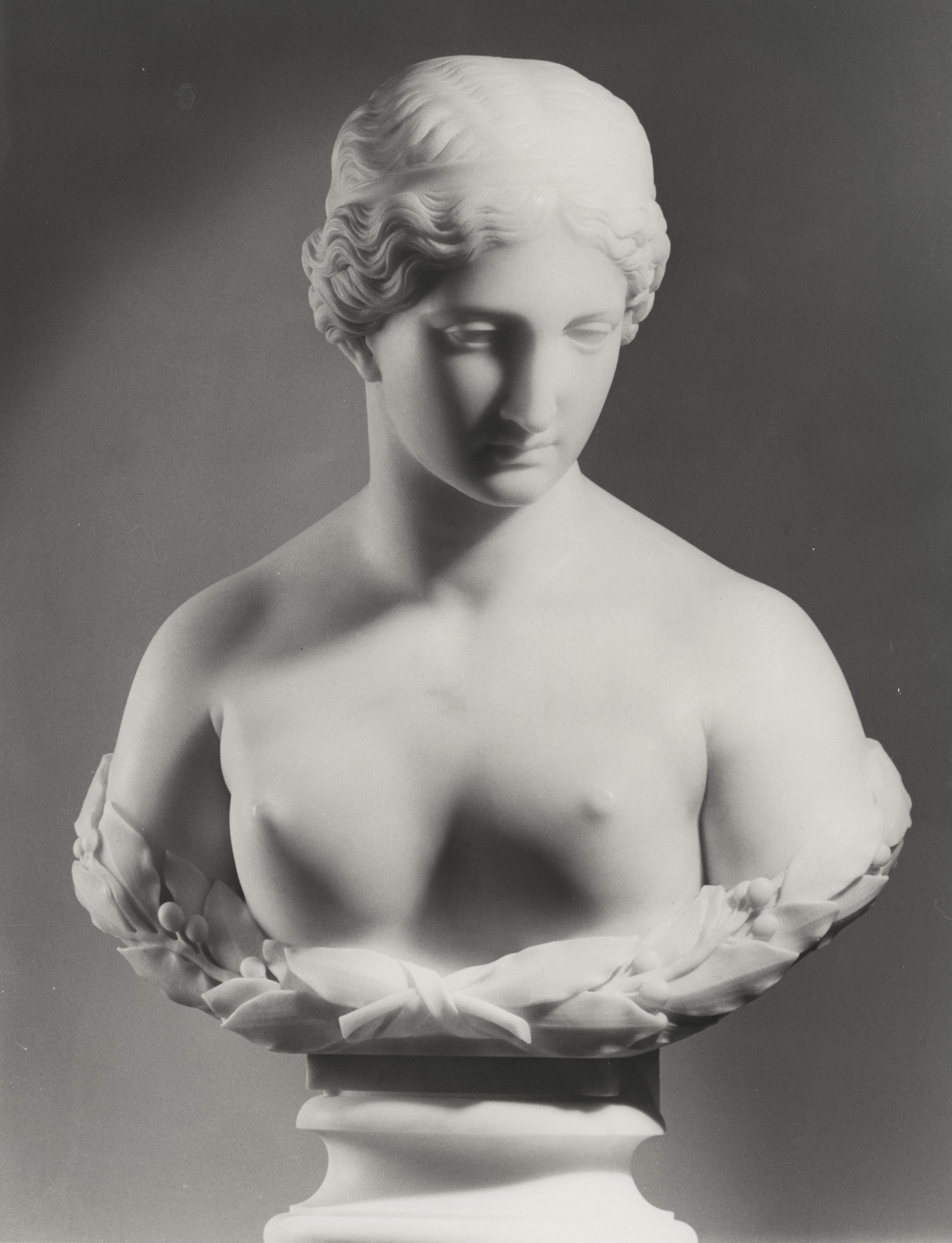
Daphne, modeled 1853

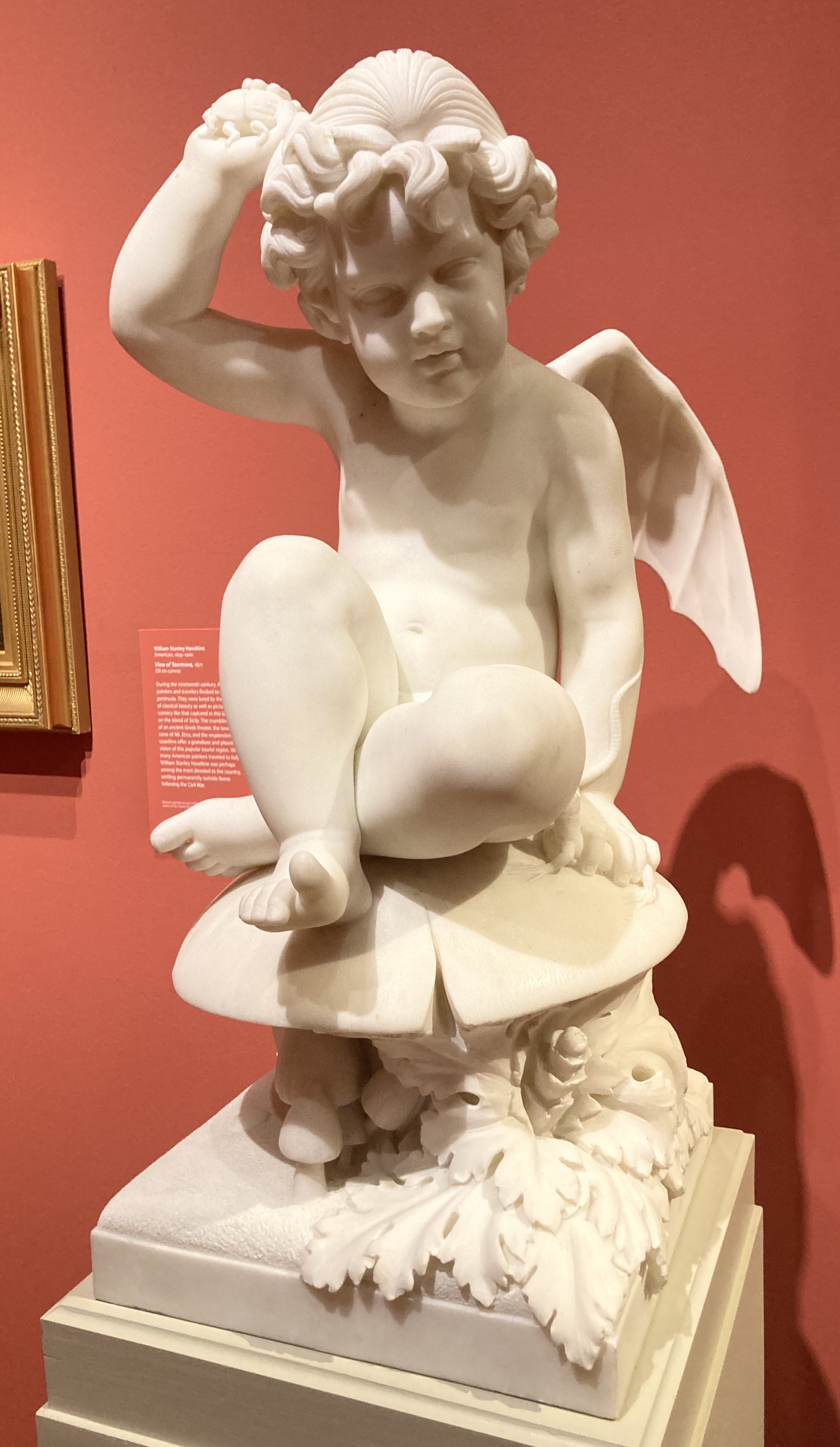
Puck, c. 1855–56

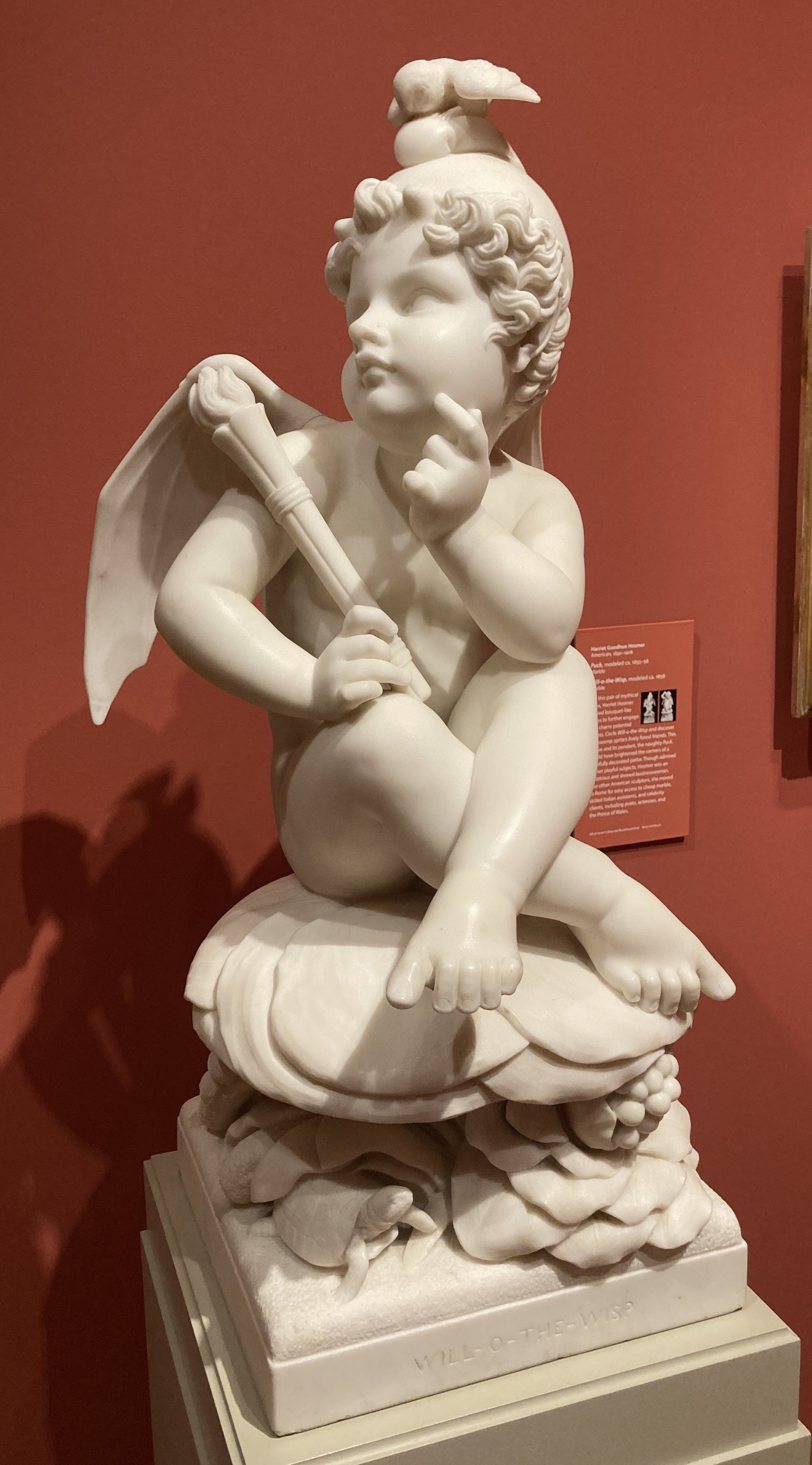
Will-o-the-Wisp, c. 1858

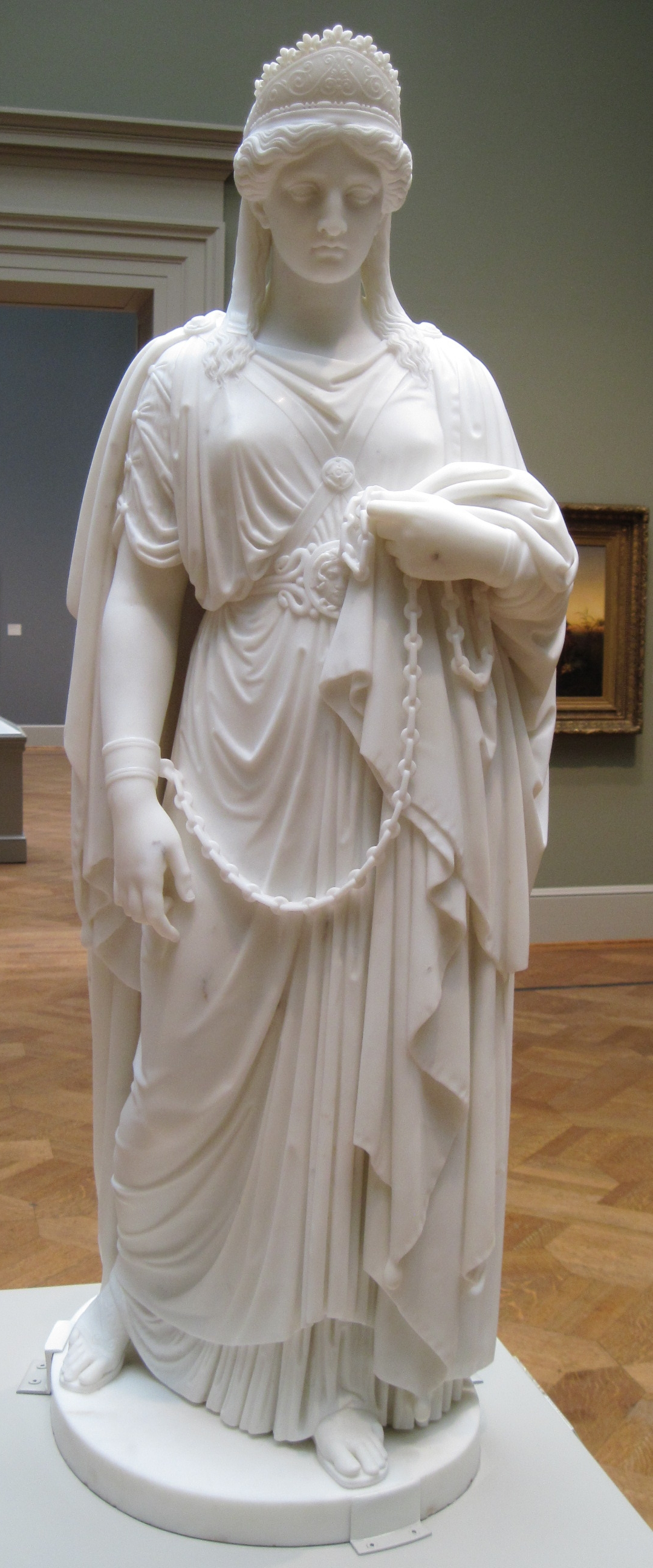
Zenobia in Chains, c. 1859, Saint Louis Art Museum

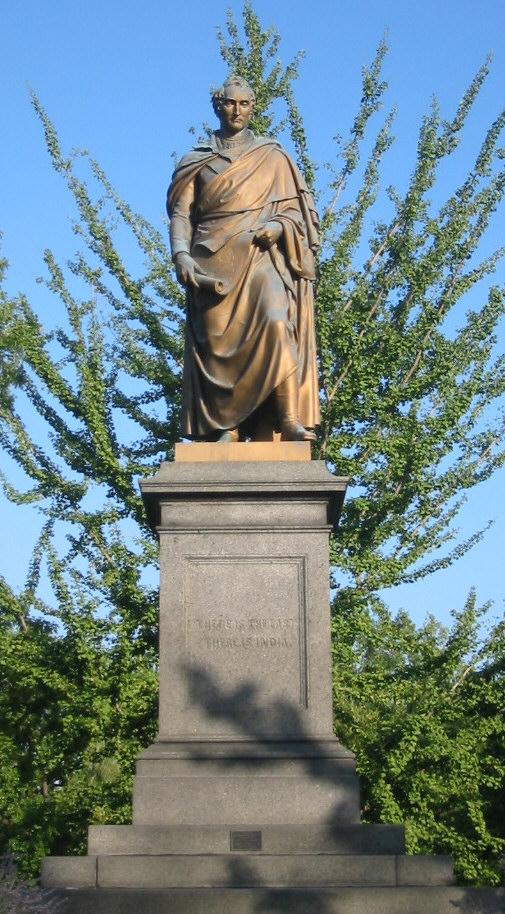
Thomas Hart Benton, c. 1868, Lafayette Square Park. St. Louis

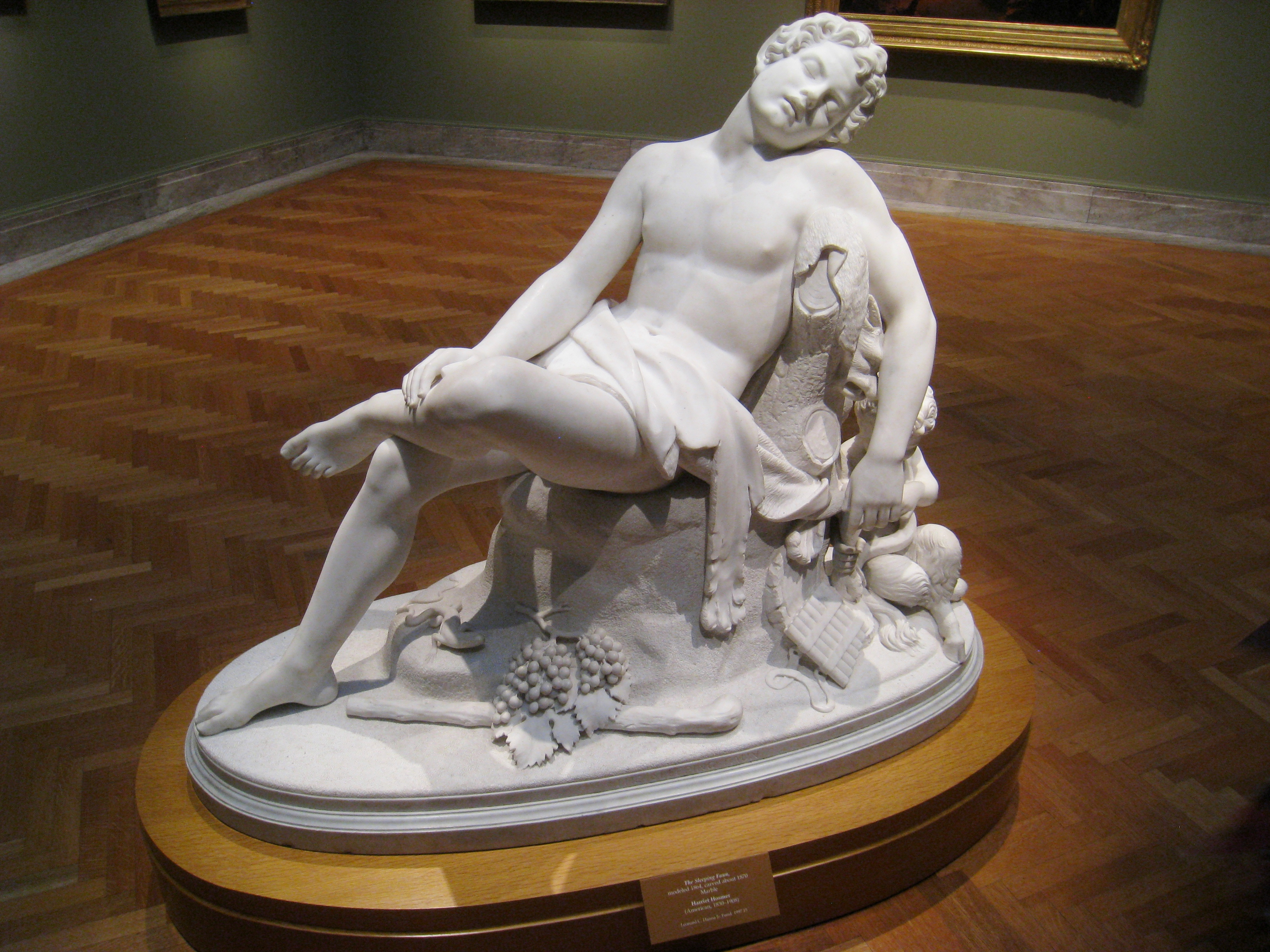
The Sleeping Faun, c. 1870, Cleveland Museum of Art

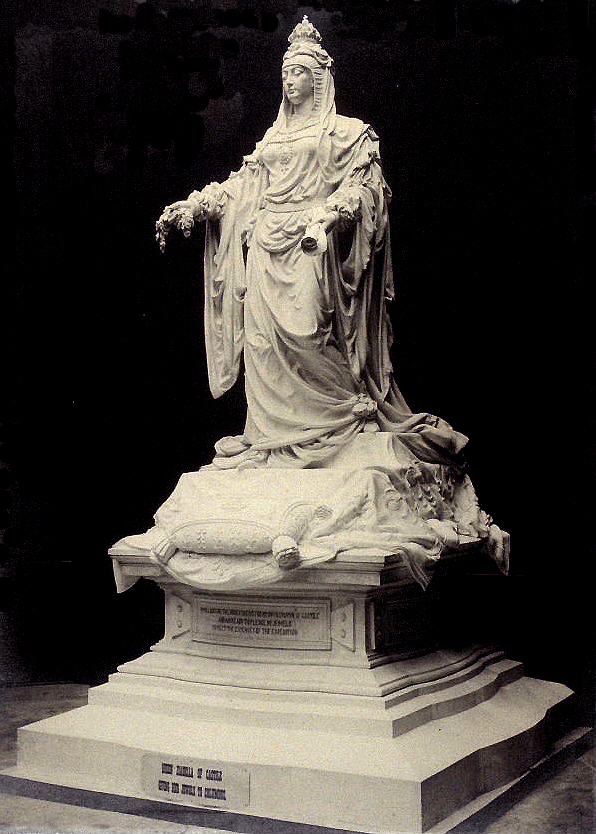
Queen Isabella c. 1893

== Sources ==
- Chisholm, Hugh, ed. (1911). "Hosmer, Harriet Goodhue" . Encyclopædia Britannica. Vol. 13 (11th ed.). Cambridge University Press. p. 791.
- Culkin, Kate. Harriet Hosmer: A Cultural Biography. Amherst: University of Massachusetts Press, 2010.
- Maclean, Maggie (August 9, 2012). "Harriet Hosmer: One of the First Women Artists in the United States". Civil War Women.
- "Harriet Goodhue Hosmer". Encyclopædia Britannica.
- "Harriet Hosmer and the Triumph over Captivity". Radford University.
