= Titus Hosmer =

American Founding Father and politician

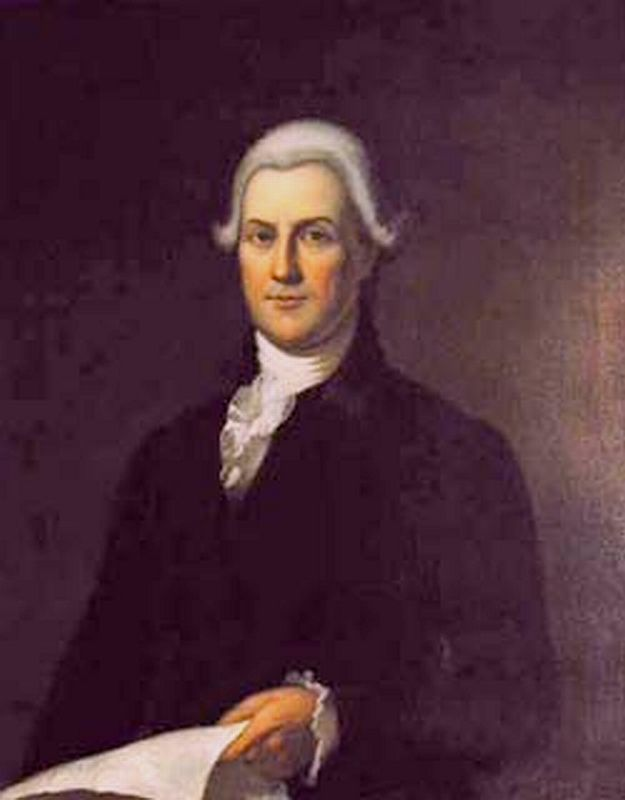

Delegate from Connecticut to the Continental Congress
- In office 1778–1780
- Preceded by: Office established
- Succeeded by: James Wadsworth

Personal details
- Born: 1736 West Hartford, Connecticut Colony, British America
- Died: August 4, 1780 (aged 43–44) Middletown, Connecticut, U.S.
- Resting place: Mortimer Cemetery, Middletown
- Education: Yale College (B.A., 1757)
- Profession: Lawyer, jurist, politician

Titus Hosmer (1736 – August 4, 1780) was an American Founding Father, lawyer, and jurist from Middletown, Connecticut. He was a delegate for Connecticut to the Continental Congress in 1778, when he signed the Articles of Confederation.

== Biography ==
Titus was born in West Hartford, Connecticut, attended Yale and graduated in 1757. He read for the law, was admitted to the bar, and began a practice in Middletown, Connecticut. Hosmer was elected to the Connecticut State Assembly annually from 1773 to 1778 and served as their speaker in 1777. In May 1778, he became a member of the State Senate and remained in that office until he died. Later in 1778, the joint state legislature sent him as one of their delegates to the Second Continental Congress. He was subsequently elected by the Continental Congress on January 22, 1780, to serve as a federal judge on the Court of Appeals in Cases of Capture.

Titus died at Middletown on August 4, 1780, of undisclosed causes, and is buried in the Mortimer Cemetery there. Joel Barlow, who received Hosmer's patronage, wrote a much-admired elegy on his death.

== Family ==
Hosmer married Lydia Lord on November 29, 1761, in Middletown. One son, Stephen Hosmer, became a lawyer and was the chief justice of the Connecticut Supreme Court. The other son, Hezekiah Lord Hosmer, became a U.S. representative for New York. A grandson, also named Hezekiah Lord Hosmer, became the first chief justice of the Montana Territory and authored several books.

The Hosmer family is traced to Rotherfield in Sussex (and much earlier to Otterhampton, Somerset), where Alexander Hosmer was native before a marian martyr in nearby Lewes and the family consequently moved to Kent in the following generations. His colonial ancestor, Colonel Thomas Titus, was a Roundhead in the New Model Army, who left Hawkhurst in Kent for Boston upon the English Restoration. Thomas Titus later settled in Middletown.

Hosmer had a Whig relative who fought and was mortally wounded in the Battles of Lexington and Concord against Hugh Percy, 2nd Duke of Northumberland. There is a Hosmer Corner in Hampden County, Massachusetts named for the family although the Hosmer's are more renowned as founders of Hartford Connecticut.
