= Stephen Hosmer =

American judge

Stephen Titus Hosmer (January 10, 1763 – August 5, 1834) was an American lawyer and jurist who was the chief justice of the Connecticut Supreme Court from 1815 to 1833.

== Biography ==
He was born in Middletown, Connecticut and lived there all his life. He was the son of Titus Hosmer, a member of the Continental Congress. He attended Yale University, graduating in 1782, and began his law practice in 1785. He was a member of the Connecticut Council for ten years.

Hosmer married Lucia Parsons, a daughter of General Samuel Holden Parsons; they had 11 children, of which only 3 were alive in 1834 when Hosmer died (and his daughter Sarah Mehetable died of cholera eight days after her father.)
