= 2018 Montana Senate election =

- November 6, 2018

25 seats in the Montana Senate 26 seats needed for a majority
	Majority party	Minority party
Leader	Scott Sales	Jon Sesso
Party	Republican	Democratic
Leader since	January 2, 2017	January 5, 2015
Leader's seat	35th – Bozeman	37th – Butte
Last election	32	18
Seats won	30	20
Seat change	▼2	▲2
Popular vote	128,760	99,828
Percentage	54.76%	42.45%
- Results: Democratic gain Republican hold Democratic hold No election
Senate President before election
Scott Sales
Republican
Elected Senate President
Scott Sales
Republican

An election was held on November 6, 2018, to elect 25 members to Montana's Senate. The election coincided with elections for other offices, including the U.S Senate, U.S. House of Representatives, and state house. The primary election was held on June 2, 2018.

== Results summary ==
Party	Candi- dates	Votes		Seats		
Party	Candi- dates	No.	%	No.	+/–	%
Republican Party	23	128,760	54.76%	30	▼2	60
Democratic Party	21	99,828	42.45%	20	▲2	40
Independent	1	4,274	1.82%	0	Steady	0
Libertarian Party	5	2,292	0.97%	0	Steady	0
Total	50	235,154	100%	50	Steady	100

Senate seats
Republican	60%
Democratic	40%

Popular vote
Republican	54.756%
Democratic	42.452%
Independent	1.818%
Libertarian	0.975%

=== Close races ===
Districts where the margin of victory was under 10%:

1. District 14, 1.48%
2. District 12, 2.9%
3. District 49, 3.18%
4. District 32, 3.59% gain
5. District 24, 7.98%
6. District 30, 8.84%
7. District 13, 9.26%

=== Incumbents defeated in the primary election ===
- Pat Connell (R-District 43), defeated by Jason Ellsworth (R)

=== Incumbents defeated in the general election ===
- Jedediah Hinkle (R-District 32), defeated by Pat Flowers (D)

=== Open seats that changed parties ===
- Edward Buttrey (R-District 11) was term-limited, seat won by Tom Jacobson (D)

== Predictions ==
Source	Ranking	As of
Governing	Safe R	October 8, 2018

== Summary of results by state senate district ==
State senate district	Incumbent	Party	Elected senator	Party
Montana 1	Chas Vincent	Rep	Mike Cuffe	Rep
Montana 4	Mark Blasdel	Rep	Mark Blasdel	Rep
Montana 5	Bob Keenan	Rep	Bob Keenan	Rep
Montana 8	Lea Whitford	Dem	Susan Webber	Dem
Montana 9	Llew Jones	Rep	Bruce Gillespie	Rep
Montana 11	Edward Buttrey	Rep	Tom Jacobson	Dem
Montana 12	Carlie Boland	Dem	Carlie Boland	Dem
Montana 13	Brian Hoven	Rep	Brian Hoven	Rep
Montana 14	Russel Tempel	Rep	Russel Tempel	Rep
Montana 19	Eric Moore	Rep	Kenneth Bogner	Rep
Montana 20	Duane Ankney	Rep	Duane Ankney	Rep
Montana 22	Douglas Kary	Rep	Douglas Kary	Rep
Montana 24	Mary McNally	Dem	Mary McNally	Dem
Montana 27	Cary Smith	Rep	Cary Smith	Rep
Montana 29	David Howard	Rep	David Howard	Rep
Montana 30	Nels Swandal	Rep	John Esp	Rep
Montana 32	Jedediah Hinkle	Rep	Pat Flowers	Dem
Montana 33	Jennifer Pomnichowski	Dem	Jennifer Pomnichowski	Dem
Montana 34	Gordon Vance	Rep	Gordon Vance	Rep
Montana 41	Mary Caferro	Dem	Janet Ellis	Dem
Montana 42	Jill Cohenour	Dem	Jill Cohenour	Dem
Montana 43	Pat Connell	Rep	Jason Ellsworth	Rep
Montana 48	Nate McConnell	Dem	Nate McConnell	Dem
Montana 49	Diane Sands	Dem	Diane Sands	Dem
Montana 50	Tom Facey	Dem	Bryce Bennett	Dem

== Detailed results ==
=== Districts 1–22 ===
==== District 1 ====
Incumbent Republican Chas Vincent had represented the 1st district since 2011. Vincent was term-limited and could not seek re-election.

Montana Senate 1st district general election, 2018
Party	Candidate	Votes	%
Republican	Mike Cuffe	7,333	83.17%
Libertarian	Austen Lee Nelson	1,484	16.83%
Total votes		8,817	100%
Republican hold			

==== District 4 ====
Incumbent Republican Mark Blasdel had represented the 4th district since 2014.

Montana Senate 4th district general election, 2018
Party	Candidate	Votes	%
Republican	Mark Blasdel (incumbent)	5,626	64.50%
Democratic	Diane Taylor-Manhke	3,097	35.50%
Total votes		8,723	100%
Republican hold			

==== District 5 ====
Incumbent Republican Bob Keenan had represented the 4th district since 2015.

Montana Senate 5th district general election, 2018
Party	Candidate	Votes	%
Republican	Bob Keenan (incumbent)	8,048	100%
Total votes		8,048	100%
Republican hold			

==== District 8 ====
Incumbent Democrat Lea Whitford had represented the 8th district since 2015. Whitford did not seek re-election.

Montana Senate 8th district general election, 2018
Party	Candidate	Votes	%
Democratic	Susan Webber	5,443	100%
Total votes		5,443	100%
Democratic hold			

==== District 9 ====
Incumbent Republican Llew Jones had represented the 9th district since 2011. Jones was term-limited and successfully ran for a seat in the state house.

Montana Senate 9th district general election, 2018
Party	Candidate	Votes	%
Republican	Bruce Gillespie	6,347	73.25%
Democratic	Kurt J. Dyer	2,318	26.75%
Total votes		8,665	100%
Republican hold			

==== District 11 ====
Incumbent Republican Edward Buttrey had represented the 11th district and its predecessors since 2011. Buttrey was term-limited and successfully ran for a seat in the state house. State Representative Tom Jacobson, a Democrat, won the open seat.

Montana Senate 11th district general election, 2018
Party	Candidate	Votes	%
Democratic	Tom Jacobson	4,706	57.50%
Republican	Adam Rosendale	3,478	42.50%
Total votes		8,184	100%
Democratic gain from Republican			

==== District 12 ====
Incumbent Democrat Carlie Boland had represented the 12th district since 2017.

Montana Senate 12th district general election, 2018
Party	Candidate	Votes	%
Democratic	Carlie Boland (incumbent)	3,680	51.45%
Republican	Steven Galloway	3,472	48.55%
Total votes		7,152	100%
Democratic hold			

==== District 13 ====
Incumbent Republican Brian Hoven had represented the 13th district since 2015.

Montana Senate 13th district general election, 2018
Party	Candidate	Votes	%
Republican	Brian Hoven (incumbent)	3,315	53.22%
Democratic	Bob Moretti	2,738	43.96%
Libertarian	Kevin Vincent Leatherbar Row	176	2.83%
Total votes		6,229	100%
Republican hold			

==== District 14 ====
Incumbent Republican Russel Tempel had represented the 14th district since 2017.

Montana Senate 14th district general election, 2018
Party	Candidate	Votes	%
Republican	Russel Tempel (incumbent)	4,526	50.74%
Democratic	Paul Tuss	4,394	49.26%
Total votes		8,920	100%
Republican hold			

==== District 19 ====
Incumbent Republican Eric Moore had represented the 19th district and its predecessors since 2011. Moore was term-limited and successfully ran for a seat in the state house.

Montana Senate 19th district general election, 2018
Party	Candidate	Votes	%
Republican	Kenneth Bogner	7,334	80.85%
Democratic	Mary Zeiss Stange	1,737	19.15%
Total votes		9,071	100%
Republican hold			

==== District 20 ====
Incumbent Republican Duane Ankney had represented the 20th district since 2015.

Montana Senate 20th district general election, 2018
Party	Candidate	Votes	%
Republican	Duane Ankney (incumbent)	8,226	100%
Total votes		8,226	100%
Republican hold			

==== District 22 ====
Incumbent Republican Douglas Kary had represented the 22nd district since 2015.

Montana Senate 22nd district general election, 2018
Party	Candidate	Votes	%
Republican	Douglas Kary (incumbent)	5,120	60.46%
Democratic	Jennifer Merecki	3,349	39.54%
Total votes		8,469	100%
Republican hold			

=== Districts 24–50 ===
==== District 24 ====
Incumbent Democrat Mary McNally had represented the 24th district since 2015.

Montana Senate 24th district general election, 2018
Party	Candidate	Votes	%
Democratic	Mary McNally (incumbent)	4,608	53.99%
Republican	Tom McGillvray	3,927	46.01%
Total votes		8,535	100%
Democratic hold			

==== District 27 ====
Incumbent Republican Cary Smith had represented the 27th district since 2015.

Montana Senate 27th district general election, 2018
Party	Candidate	Votes	%
Republican	Cary Smith (incumbent)	8,671	68.11%
Democratic	Bryan Stafford	4,060	31.89%
Total votes		12,731	100%
Republican hold			

==== District 29 ====
Incumbent Republican David Howard had represented the 29th district since 2015.

Montana Senate 29th district general election, 2018
Party	Candidate	Votes	%
Republican	David Howard (incumbent)	7,351	66.83%
Democratic	Elizabeth (Betsy) Scanlin	3,649	33.17%
Total votes		11,000	100%
Republican hold			

==== District 30 ====
Incumbent Republican Nels Swandal had represented the 30th district since 2015. Swandal did not seek re-election.

Montana Senate 30th district general election, 2018
Party	Candidate	Votes	%
Republican	John Esp	6,254	53.16%
Democratic	Dan Vermillion	5,214	44.32%
Libertarian	Frank McClain	296	2.52%
Total votes		11,764	100%
Republican hold			

==== District 32 ====
Incumbent Republican Jedediah Hinkle had represented the 32nd district since 2014. He lost re-election to Democrat Pat Flowers.

Montana Senate 32nd district general election, 2018
Party	Candidate	Votes	%
Democratic	Pat Flowers	5,979	50.38%
Republican	Jedediah Hinkle (incumbent)	5,552	46.79%
Libertarian	Francis Wendt	336	2.83%
Total votes		11,867	100%
Democratic gain from Republican			

==== District 33 ====
Incumbent Democrat Jennifer Pomnichowski had represented the 33rd district since 2015.

Montana Senate 33rd district general election, 2018
Party	Candidate	Votes	%
Democratic	Jennifer Pomnichowski (incumbent)	9,627	100%
Total votes		9,627	100%
Democratic hold			

==== District 34 ====
Incumbent Republican Gordon Vance had represented the 34th district since 2015.

Montana Senate 34th district general election, 2018
Party	Candidate	Votes	%
Republican	Gordon Vance (incumbent)	6,395	64.79%
Democratic	Sam Newville	3,475	35.21%
Total votes		9,870	100%
Republican hold			

==== District 41 ====
Incumbent Democrat Mary Caferro had represented the 41st district and its predecessors since 2011. Caferro was term-limited and successfully ran for a seat in the state house. State representative Janet Ellis won the open seat.

Montana Senate 41st district general election, 2018
Party	Candidate	Votes	%
Democratic	Janet Ellis	6,065	57.76%
Republican	John Schmidt	4,436	42.24%
Total votes		10,501	100%
Democratic hold			

==== District 42 ====
Incumbent Democrat Jill Cohenour had represented the 43rd district since 2015.

Montana Senate 42nd district general election, 2018
Party	Candidate	Votes	%
Democratic	Jill Cohenour (incumbent)	5,556	57.07%
Republican	Bob Leach	4,180	42.93%
Total votes		9,736	100%
Democratic hold			

==== District 43 ====
Incumbent Republican Pat Connell had represented the 43rd district since 2015. Connell lost re-nomination to fellow Republican Jason Ellsworth.

Montana Senate 43rd district general election, 2018
Party	Candidate	Votes	%
Republican	Jason Ellsworth	6,990	62.06%
Independent	Laura Garber	4,274	37.94%
Total votes		11,264	100%
Republican hold			

==== District 48 ====
Incumbent Democrat Nate McConnell had represented the 48th district since 2018.

Montana Senate 48th district general election, 2018
Party	Candidate	Votes	%
Democratic	Nate McConnell (incumbent)	6,427	62.76%
Republican	Adam S. Pummill	3,813	37.24%
Total votes		10,240	100%
Democratic hold			

==== District 49 ====
Incumbent Democrat Diane Sands had represented the 49th district since 2015.

Montana Senate 49th district general election, 2018
Party	Candidate	Votes	%
Democratic	Diane Sands (incumbent)	5,579	51.59%
Republican	Chase Reynolds	5,236	48.41%
Total votes		10,815	100%
Democratic hold			

==== District 50 ====
Incumbent Democrat Tom Facey had represented the 50th district and its predecessors since 2011. Facey was term-limited and could not seek re-election. State Representative Bryce Bennett won the open seat.

Montana Senate 50th district general election, 2018
Party	Candidate	Votes	%
Democratic	Bryce Bennett	8,127	72.20%
Republican	Niki Sardot	3,130	27.80%
Total votes		11,257	100%
Democratic hold			
