= 2022 Montana Senate election =

- November 8, 2022

27 of 50 seats in the Montana Senate 26 seats needed for a majority
| | Majority party | Minority party |
|---|---|---|
| Leader | Mark Blasdel (term-limited) | Jill Cohenour (term-limited) |
| Party | Republican | Democratic |
| Leader since | January 4, 2021 | January 4, 2021 |
| Leader's seat | 4th – Kalispell | 42nd – Helena |
| Last election | 31 | 19 |
| Seats won | 34 | 16 |
| Seat change | ▲3 | ▼3 |
| Popular vote | 147,211 | 84,414 |
| Percentage | 63.56% | 36.44% |
- Results: Republican gain Republican hold Democratic hold No election
Senate President before election
Mark Blasdel
Republican
Elected Senate President
Jason Ellsworth
Republican

An election was held on November 8, 2022, to elect 25 members to Montana's Senate. The election coincided with elections for other offices, including the U.S. House of Representatives, and state house. The primary election was held on June 7, 2022. Republicans expanded their supermajority in the chamber as they did in the house.

== Retirements ==
=== Democrats ===
- District 12: Carlie Boland retired.
- District 24: Mary McNally retired due to term limits.
- District 33: Jennifer Pomnichowski retired due to term limits.
- District 42: Jill Cohenour retired due to term limits.
- District 49: Diane Sands retired due to term limits.

=== Republicans ===
- District 4: Mark Blasdel retired due to term limits.
- District 5: Bob Keenan retired due to term limits.
- District 13: Brian Hoven retired due to term limits.
- District 20: Duane Ankney retired due to term limits.
- District 22: Douglas Kary retired due to term limits.
- District 27: Cary Smith retired due to term limits.
- District 29: David Howard retired due to term limits.
- District 34: Gordon Vance retired due to term limits.

== Incumbents defeated ==
=== In primaries ===
==== Democrats ====
- District 50: Tom Steenberg lost renomination to Andrea Olsen.

=== In general ===
==== Democrats ====
- District 11: Tom Jacobson defeated by Daniel Emrich.

== Open seats that changed parties ==
=== Democrats ===
- District 12: Carlie Boland (D) was term-limited and could not seek re-election, seat won by Wendy McKamey (R)

== Predictions ==
| Source | Ranking | As of |
|---|---|---|
| Sabato's Crystal Ball | Safe R | May 19, 2022 |

== Results summary ==
| Party | Candi- dates | Votes | | Seats | | |
| Party | Candi- dates | No. | % | No. | +/– | % |
|---|---|---|---|---|---|---|
| Republican Party | 26 | 147,211 | 63.56 | 34 | ▲3 | 68 |
| Democratic Party | 19 | 84,414 | 36.44 | 16 | ▼3 | 32 |
| Total | 55 | 231,625 | 100 | 50 | Steady | 100 |

Senate seats
| Republican | 68.00% |
| Democratic | 32.00% |

Popular vote
| Republican | 63.56% |
| Democratic | 36.44% |

=== Close races ===
Districts where the margin of victory was under 10%:

1. District 13, 3.33%
2. District 32, 4.6%
3. District 11, 5.84% gain
4. District 49, 8.85%
5. District 39 (unexpired), 9.32% gain

== Summary of results by State Senate district ==
| State Senate district | Incumbent | Party | Elected Senator | Party |
|---|---|---|---|---|
| Montana 1 | Mike Cuffe | Rep | Mike Cuffe | Rep |
| Montana 4 | Mark Blasdel | Rep | John Fuller | Rep |
| Montana 5 | Bob Keenan | Rep | Mark Noland | Rep |
| Montana 8 | Susan Webber | Dem | Susan Webber | Dem |
| Montana 9 | Bruce Gillespie | Rep | Bruce Gillespie | Rep |
| Montana 11 | Tom Jacobson | Dem | Daniel Emrich | Rep |
| Montana 12 | Carlie Boland | Dem | Wendy McKamey | Rep |
| Montana 13 | Brian Hoven | Rep | Jeremy Trebas | Rep |
| Montana 14 | Russel Tempel | Rep | Russel Tempel | Rep |
| Montana 15 (special) | Dan Bartel | Rep | Dan Bartel | Rep |
| Montana 19 | Kenneth Bogner | Rep | Kenneth Bogner | Rep |
| Montana 20 | Duane Ankney | Rep | Barry Usher | Rep |
| Montana 22 | Douglas Kary | Rep | Daniel Zolnikov | Rep |
| Montana 24 | Mary McNally | Dem | Kathy Kelker | Dem |
| Montana 27 | Cary Smith | Rep | Dennis Lenz | Rep |
| Montana 29 | David Howard | Rep | Forrest Mandeville | Rep |
| Montana 30 | John Esp | Rep | John Esp | Rep |
| Montana 32 | Pat Flowers | Dem | Pat Flowers | Dem |
| Montana 33 | Jennifer Pomnichowski | Dem | Denise Hayman | Dem |
| Montana 34 | Gordon Vance | Rep | Shelley Vance | Rep |
| Montana 39 (special) | Mark Sweeney | Dem | Terry Vermeire | Rep |
| Montana 41 | Janet Ellis | Dem | Janet Ellis | Dem |
| Montana 42 | Jill Cohenour | Dem | Mary Ann Dunwell | Dem |
| Montana 43 | Jason Ellsworth | Rep | Jason Ellsworth | Rep |
| Montana 48 | Shane Morigeau | Dem | Shane Morigeau | Dem |
| Montana 49 | Diane Sands | Dem | Willis Curdy | Dem |
| Montana 50 | Tom Steenberg | Dem | Andrea Olsen | Dem |

== Detailed results ==
=== Districts 1–22 ===
==== District 1 ====
Incumbent Republican Mike Cuffe had represented the 1st district since 2019.

Montana Senate 1st district general election, 2022
| Party | Candidate | Votes | % |
|---|---|---|---|
| Republican | Mike Cuffe (incumbent) | 7,586 | 100% |
| Total votes | | 7,586 | 100% |
| Republican hold | | | |

==== District 4 ====
Incumbent Republican Senate President Mark Blasdel hds represented the 4th district since 2015. Blasdel was term-limited and could not seek re-election. State Representative John Fuller and Lee Huestis were seeking the Republican nomination.

Montana Senate 4th district general election, 2022
| Party | Candidate | Votes | % |
|---|---|---|---|
| Republican | John Fuller | 5,180 | 62.19% |
| Democratic | Kyle Waterman | 3,149 | 37.81% |
| Total votes | | 8,329 | 100% |
| Republican hold | | | |

==== District 5 ====
Incumbent Republican Bob Keenan had represented the 4th district since 2015. Keenan was term-limited and could not seek re-election. Mark Noland and Rob Tracy were seeking the Republican nomination.

Montana Senate 5th district general election, 2022
| Party | Candidate | Votes | % |
|---|---|---|---|
| Republican | Mark Noland | 7,995 | 100% |
| Total votes | | 7,995 | 100% |
| Republican hold | | | |

==== District 8 ====
Incumbent Democrat Susan Webber had represented the 8th district since 2019.

Montana Senate 8th district general election, 2022
| Party | Candidate | Votes | % |
|---|---|---|---|
| Democratic | Susan Webber (incumbent) | 2,675 | 57.27% |
| Republican | Rick Jennison | 1,996 | 42.73% |
| Total votes | | 4,671 | 100% |
| Democratic hold | | | |

==== District 9 ====
Incumbent Republican Bruce Gillespie had represented the 9th district since 2019.

Montana Senate 9th district general election, 2022
| Party | Candidate | Votes | % |
|---|---|---|---|
| Republican | Bruce Gillespie (incumbent) | 6,780 | 100% |
| Total votes | | 6,780 | 100% |
| Republican hold | | | |

==== District 11 ====
Incumbent Democrat Tom Jacobson had represented the 11th district since 2019.

Montana Senate 11th district general election, 2022
| Party | Candidate | Votes | % |
|---|---|---|---|
| Republican | Daniel Emrich | 3,683 | 52.92% |
| Democratic | Tom Jacobson (incumbent) | 3,276 | 47.08% |
| Total votes | | 6,959 | 100% |
| Republican gain from Democratic | | | |

==== District 12 ====
Incumbent Democrat Carlie Boland had represented the 12th district since 2017. Boland did not seek re-election.

Montana Senate 12th district general election, 2022
| Party | Candidate | Votes | % |
|---|---|---|---|
| Republican | Wendy McKamey | 3,358 | 55.98% |
| Democratic | Jacob Bachmeier | 2,641 | 44.02% |
| Total votes | | 5,999 | 100% |
| Republican gain from Democratic | | | |

==== District 13 ====
Incumbent Republican Brian Hoven had represented the 13th district since 2015. Hoven was term-limited and could not seek re-election.

Montana Senate 13th district general election, 2022
| Party | Candidate | Votes | % |
|---|---|---|---|
| Republican | Jeremy Trebas | 2,681 | 51.67% |
| Democratic | Casey Schreiner | 2,508 | 48.33% |
| Total votes | | 5,189 | 100% |
| Republican hold | | | |

==== District 14 ====
Incumbent Republican Russel Tempel had represented the 14th district since 2017. Steven Chivilicek challenged Tempel for the Republican nomination.

Montana Senate 14th district general election, 2022
| Party | Candidate | Votes | % |
|---|---|---|---|
| Republican | Russel Tempel (incumbent) | 5,624 | 71.60% |
| Democratic | David H. Brewer | 2,231 | 28.40% |
| Total votes | | 7,855 | 100% |
| Republican hold | | | |

==== District 15 (special) ====
Incumbent Republican Dan Bartel had represented the 15th district since his appointment on November 8, 2021.

Montana Senate 15th district special general election, 2022
| Party | Candidate | Votes | % |
|---|---|---|---|
| Republican | Dan Bartel (incumbent) | 7,504 | 79.94% |
| Democratic | Cindy Palmer | 1,883 | 20.06% |
| Total votes | | 9,387 | 100% |
| Republican hold | | | |

==== District 19 ====
Incumbent Republican Kenneth Bogner had represented the 19th district since 2019.

Montana Senate 19th district general election, 2022
| Party | Candidate | Votes | % |
|---|---|---|---|
| Republican | Kenneth Bogner (incumbent) | 7,643 | 100% |
| Total votes | | 7,643 | 100% |
| Republican hold | | | |

==== District 20 ====
Incumbent Republican Duane Ankney had represented the 20th district since 2015. Ankney was term-limited and could not seek re-election. Geraldine Custer and Barry Usher were seeking the Republican nomination.

Montana Senate 20th district general election, 2022
| Party | Candidate | Votes | % |
|---|---|---|---|
| Republican | Barry Usher | 7,739 | 100% |
| Total votes | | 7,739 | 100% |
| Republican hold | | | |

==== District 22 ====
Incumbent Republican Douglas Kary had represented the 22nd district since 2015. Kary was term-limited and could not seek re-election.

Montana Senate 22nd district general election, 2022
| Party | Candidate | Votes | % |
|---|---|---|---|
| Republican | Daniel Zolnikov | 4,853 | 65.74% |
| Democratic | Terry Dennis | 2,529 | 34.26% |
| Total votes | | 7,382 | 100% |
| Republican hold | | | |

=== Districts 24–50 ===
==== District 24 ====
Incumbent Democrat Mary McNally had represented the 24th district since 2015. McNally was term-limited and could not seek re-election.

Montana Senate 24th district general election, 2022
| Party | Candidate | Votes | % |
|---|---|---|---|
| Democratic | Kathy Kelker | 3,950 | 55.96% |
| Republican | Elijah Tidswell | 3,109 | 44.04% |
| Total votes | | 7,059 | 100% |
| Democratic hold | | | |

==== District 27 ====
Incumbent Republican Cary Smith had represented the 27th district since 2015. Smith was term-limited and could not seek re-election.

Montana Senate 27th district general election, 2022
| Party | Candidate | Votes | % |
|---|---|---|---|
| Republican | Dennis Lenz | 9,670 | 100% |
| Total votes | | 9,670 | 100% |
| Republican hold | | | |

==== District 29 ====
Incumbent Republican David Howard had represented the 29th district since 2015. Howard was term-limited and could not seek re-election.

Montana Senate 29th district general election, 2022
| Party | Candidate | Votes | % |
|---|---|---|---|
| Republican | Forrest Mandeville | 8,437 | 100% |
| Total votes | | 8,437 | 100% |
| Republican hold | | | |

==== District 30 ====
Incumbent Republican John Esp had represented the 30th district since 2019.

Montana Senate 30th district general election, 2022
| Party | Candidate | Votes | % |
|---|---|---|---|
| Republican | John Esp (incumbent) | 6,041 | 55.32% |
| Democratic | Jamie L. Isaly | 4,879 | 44.68% |
| Total votes | | 10,920 | 100% |
| Republican hold | | | |

==== District 32 ====
Incumbent Democrat Pat Flowers had represented the 32nd district since 2019.

Montana Senate 32nd district general election, 2022
| Party | Candidate | Votes | % |
|---|---|---|---|
| Democratic | Pat Flowers (incumbent) | 5,572 | 52.30% |
| Republican | Randy Chamberlin | 5,082 | 47.70% |
| Total votes | | 10,654 | 100% |
| Democratic hold | | | |

==== District 33 ====
Incumbent Democrat Jennifer Pomnichowski had represented the 33rd district since 2015. Pomnichowski was term-limited and could not seek re-election.

Montana Senate 33rd district general election, 2022
| Party | Candidate | Votes | % |
|---|---|---|---|
| Democratic | Denise Hayman | 8,039 | 67.91% |
| Republican | Adam Dewis | 3,799 | 32.09% |
| Total votes | | 11,838 | 100% |
| Democratic hold | | | |

==== District 34 ====
Incumbent Republican Gordon Vance had represented the 34th district since 2015. Vance was term-limited and could not seek re-election. Shelley Vance and Bryan Donald Haysom were seeking the Republican nomination.

Montana Senate 34th district general election, 2022
| Party | Candidate | Votes | % |
|---|---|---|---|
| Republican | Shelley Vance | 6,516 | 63.89% |
| Democratic | Damion Lynn | 3,683 | 36.11% |
| Total votes | | 10,199 | 100% |
| Republican hold | | | |

==== District 39 (special) ====
Incumbent Democrat Mark Sweeney was a candidate in the Democratic primary for the Second Congressional District of Montana, but died on May 6, 2022.

Montana Senate 39th district special general election, 2022
| Party | Candidate | Votes | % |
|---|---|---|---|
| Republican | Terry Vermeire | 4,491 | 54.66% |
| Democratic | Jesse James Mullen | 3,725 | 45.33% |
| Total votes | | 8,216 | 100% |
| Republican gain from Democratic | | | |

==== District 41 ====
Incumbent Democrat Janet Ellis had represented the 41st district since 2019.

Montana Senate 41st district general election, 2022
| Party | Candidate | Votes | % |
|---|---|---|---|
| Democratic | Janet Ellis (incumbent) | 5,423 | 55.36% |
| Republican | Dave Galt | 4,372 | 44.64% |
| Total votes | | 9,795 | 100% |
| Democratic hold | | | |

==== District 42 ====
Incumbent Democrat Jill Cohenour had represented the 43rd district since 2015. Cohenour was term-limited and could not seek re-election.

Montana Senate 42nd district general election, 2022
| Party | Candidate | Votes | % |
|---|---|---|---|
| Democratic | Mary Ann Dunwell | 5,071 | 55.28% |
| Republican | Matt Olson | 4,103 | 44.72% |
| Total votes | | 9,174 | 100% |
| Democratic hold | | | |

==== District 43 ====
Incumbent Republican Jason Ellsworth had represented the 43rd district since 2019. Joede Vanek challenged Ellsworth in the Republican primary.

Montana Senate 43rd district general election, 2022
| Party | Candidate | Votes | % |
|---|---|---|---|
| Republican | Jason Ellsworth (incumbent) | 7,868 | 67.63% |
| Democratic | John F. Schneeberger | 3,766 | 32.37% |
| Total votes | | 11,634 | 100% |
| Republican hold | | | |

==== District 48 ====
Incumbent Democrat Shane Morigeau had represented the 48th district since 2020.

Montana Senate 48th district general election, 2022
| Party | Candidate | Votes | % |
|---|---|---|---|
| Democratic | Shane Morigeau (incumbent) | 6,329 | 63.88% |
| Republican | Jacob Van Horn | 3,579 | 36.12% |
| Total votes | | 9,908 | 100% |
| Democratic hold | | | |

==== District 49 ====
Incumbent Democrat Diane Sands had represented the 49th district since 2015. Sands was term-limited and could not seek re-election. Brad Tschida and Nancy Burgoyne were seeking the Republican nomination.

Montana Senate 49th district general election, 2022
| Party | Candidate | Votes | % |
|---|---|---|---|
| Democratic | Willis Curdy | 5,630 | 54.43% |
| Republican | Brad Tschida | 4,714 | 45.57% |
| Total votes | | 10,344 | 100% |
| Democratic hold | | | |

==== District 50 ====
Incumbent Democrat Tom Steenberg had represented the 50th district and its predecessors since his appointment in September 2021. State Representative Andrea Olsen challenged Steenberg for the Democratic nomination.

Montana Senate 50th district general election, 2022
| Party | Candidate | Votes | % |
|---|---|---|---|
| Democratic | Andrea Olsen | 7,455 | 72.64% |
| Republican | Nick Knowles | 2,808 | 27.36% |
| Total votes | | 10,263 | 100% |
| Democratic hold | | | |

== See also ==
- List of Montana state legislatures
