= 2026 Montana Senate election =

- November 3, 2026

25 of 50 seats in the Montana Senate 26 seats needed for a majority
	Majority party	Minority party
Leader	Matt Regier	Pat Flowers (term-limited)
Party	Republican	Democratic
Leader since	January 6, 2025	January 2, 2023
Leader's seat	5th	31st
Last election	32	18
Seats won	30	20
Seat change	▼2	▲2
- Republican hold Democratic hold Democratic gain No election
Senate President before election
Matt Regier
Republican
Elected Senate President
Matt Regier
Republican

The 2026 Montana Senate election was held on November 3, 2026, to elect half of the members of the Montana Senate.

== Retirements ==
=== Republicans ===
1. District 1: Mike Cuffe is term-limited.
2. District 4: John Fuller did not file for re-election.
3. District 9: Bruce Gillespie is term-limited.
4. District 10: Jeremy Trebas is running for Public Service Commission.
5. District 11: Daniel Emrich did not file for re-election.
6. District 12: Wendy McKamey did not file for re-election.
7. District 14: Russel Tempel is term-limited.
8. District 18: Kenneth Bogner is term-limited.
9. District 29: John Esp is term-limited.
10. District 43: Jason Ellsworth is term-limited.

=== Democrats ===
1. District 8: Susan Webber is term-limited.
2. District 31: Pat Flowers is term-limited.
3. District 32: Denise Hayman did not file for re-election.
4. District 41: Janet Ellis is term-limited.

== Predictions ==
Source	Ranking	As of
Sabato's Crystal Ball	Safe R	January 22, 2026
State Navigate	Safe R	October 23, 2026

== Summary of results by district ==
District	2024 Pres.	Incumbent	Party	Elected Senator	Outcome
1st	R+54.9	Mike Cuffe	Rep	TBD	
4th	R+32.2	John Fuller	Rep	TBD	
6th	R+42.8	Mark Noland	Rep	TBD	
8th	D+9.1	Susan Webber	Dem	TBD	
9th	R+47.7	Bruce Gillespie	Rep	TBD	
10th	R+5.6	Jeremy Trebas	Rep	TBD	
11th	R+20.0	Daniel Emrich	Rep	TBD	
12th	R+15.4	Wendy McKamey	Rep	TBD	
14th	R+39.7	Russel Tempel	Rep	TBD	
18th	R+55.7	Kenneth Bogner	Rep	TBD	
19th	R+59.6	Barry Usher	Rep	TBD	
22nd	R+30.5	Daniel Zolnikov	Rep	TBD	
23rd	D+1.1	Emma Kerr-Carpenter	Dem	TBD	
25th	R+24.1	Dennis Lenz	Rep	TBD	
28th	R+46.5	Forrest Mandeville	Rep	TBD	
29th	D+2.2	John Esp	Rep	TBD	
31st	D+18.0	Pat Flowers	Dem	TBD	
32nd	D+8.6	Denise Hayman	Dem	TBD	
34th	R+34.2	Shelley Vance	Rep	TBD	
41st	D+6.5	Janet Ellis	Dem	TBD	
42nd	R+13.1	Mary Ann Dunwell	Dem	TBD	
43rd	R+38.9	Jason Ellsworth	Rep	TBD	
48th	D+40.5	Andrea Olsen	Dem	TBD	
49th	D+17.1	Willis Curdy	Dem	TBD	
50th	D+31.1	Shane Morigeau	Dem	TBD	

== District 1 ==
The 1st district includes all of Lincoln County and a portion of Flathead County. The incumbent is Republican Mike Cuffe, who is term-limited and cannot run for re-election to another term.

=== Republican primary ===
==== Candidates ====
===== Nominee =====
- Steve Gunderson, former state representative from the 1st district (2017–2025)

===== Eliminated in primary =====
- Vincent Backen
- Neil Duram, state representative from the 1st district (2025–present)

===== Term-limited =====
- Mike Cuffe, incumbent senator

=== Democratic primary ===
==== Candidates ====
===== Nominee =====
- Jonathan Russell Jameson

== District 4 ==
The 4th district encompasses the city of Kalispell. The incumbent is Republican John Fuller, who was elected in 2022 with 62.2% of the vote.

=== Republican primary ===
==== Candidates ====
===== Presumptive nominee =====
- Amy Regier, state representative from the 6th district (2021–present)

===== Declined =====
- John Fuller, incumbent senator

=== Democratic primary ===
==== Candidates ====
===== Nominee =====
- Kyle Waterman, nominee for this district in 2022 and for the second senate district in 2020

== District 6 ==
The 6th district includes portions of Flathead, Glacier, and Lake counties. The incumbent is Republican Mark Noland, who was elected to the 5th district in 2022 with 100% of the vote.

=== Republican primary ===
==== Candidates ====
===== Nominee =====
- Mark Noland, incumbent senator

=== Democratic primary ===
==== Candidates ====
===== Nominee =====
- Patrick Fitzpatrick

== District 8 ==
The 6th district includes all or portions of Flathead and Lake counties. The incumbent is Democrat Susan Webber, who is term-limited and cannot run for re-election to another term.

=== Democratic primary ===
==== Candidates ====
===== Nominee =====
- Tyson Running Wolf, state representative from the 16th district (2021–present)

===== Eliminated in primary =====
- Jade-Heather Ackerman

===== Term-limited =====
- Susan Webber, incumbent senator

=== Republican primary ===
==== Candidates ====
===== Nominee =====
- Christopher Paul Buckles, nominee for the 100th state representative district in 2024

== District 9 ==
The 9th district includes all of Teton and Toole counties, and most of Pondera and Lewis and Clark counties, excluding Heart Butte and Helena. The incumbent is Republican Bruce Gillespie, who is term-limited and cannot run for re-election to another term.

=== Republican primary ===
==== Candidates ====
===== Nominee =====
- Llew Jones, state representative from the 18th district (2019–present), former state senator (2011–2019) from the 9th (2015–2019) and 14th districts (2011–2015)

===== Eliminated in primary =====
- Zachary Wirth, state representative (2023–present) from the 17th (2025–present) and 80th districts (2023–2025)

===== Term-limited =====
- Bruce Gillespie, incumbent senator

=== Democratic primary ===
==== Candidates ====
===== Nominee =====
- Noy Holland

== District 10 ==
The 10th district encompasses the city of Great Falls. The incumbent is Republican Jeremy Trebas, who was elected to the 13th district in 2022 with 51.7% of the vote.

=== Republican primary ===
==== Candidates ====
===== Nominee =====
- Jessica Dyrdahl

===== Eliminated in primary =====
- Maximus Dascoulias

===== Declined =====
- Jeremy Trebas, incumbent senator (running for Public Service Commission)

=== Democratic primary ===
==== Candidates ====
===== Nominee =====
- Margaret Mitchell

== District 11 ==
The 11th district encompasses the northern outskirts of the city of Great Falls. The incumbent is Republican Daniel Emrich, who was elected in 2022 with 52.9% of the vote.

=== Republican primary ===
==== Candidates ====
===== Nominee =====
- Steven Galloway, former state representative from the 24th district (2021–2025)

===== Eliminated in primary =====
- Ed Buttrey

===== Declined =====
- Daniel Emrich, incumbent senator

=== Democratic primary ===
==== Candidates ====
===== Nominee =====
- Valynda Holland

===== Eliminated in primary =====
- Mark Winters

===== Withdrawn =====
- Brooke Winters

== District 12 ==
The 12th district encompasses the southern outskirts of the city of Great Falls. The incumbent is Republican Wendy McKamey, who was elected in 2022 with 56.0% of the vote.

=== Republican primary ===
==== Candidates ====
===== Nominee =====
- George Nikolakakos, state representative from the 26th district (2023–present)

===== Eliminated in primary =====
- Randy Pinocci, state public service commissioner from the 1st district (2019–present)

===== Declined =====
- Wendy McKamey, incumbent senator

=== Democratic primary ===
==== Candidates ====
===== Nominee =====
- Mindy Leach, optometrist

===== Eliminated in primary =====
- James G. Whitaker, Republican candidate for the 22nd state representative district in 2024 and the 11th state senate district in 2010

===== Withdrawn =====
- Mark Winters (running in the 11th district)

== District 14 ==
The 14th district includes all of Liberty County and the northern portions of Blaine, Hill, Phillips, and Valley counties. The incumbent is Republican Russel Tempel, who is term-limited and cannot run for re-election to another term.

=== Republican primary ===
==== Candidates ====
===== Nominee =====
- Eric Albus, state representative from the 28th district (2025–present)

===== Eliminated in primary =====
- Mark L. Wicks

===== Term-limited =====
- Russel Tempel, incumbent senator

=== Democratic primary ===
==== Candidates ====
===== Nominee =====
- Blake Borst, nominee for the 28th state representative district in 2024

== District 18 ==
The 18th district includes all or portions of Big Horn, Custer, Garfield, Rosebud, Treasure, and Yellowstone counties. The incumbent is Republican Kenneth Bogner, who is term-limited and cannot run for re-election to another term.

=== Republican primary ===
==== Candidates ====
===== Nominee =====
- Greg Kmetz, state representative (2023–present) from the 36th (2025–present) and 38th districts (2023–2025)

===== Eliminated in primary =====
- Doug Martens

===== Term-limited =====
- Kenneth Bogner, incumbent senator

=== Democratic primary ===
==== Candidates ====
===== Nominee =====
- Stan Taylor, nominee for the 36th state representative district in 2024

== District 19 ==
The 19th district includes all or portions of Fergus, Golden Valley, Musselshell, Petroleum, and Yellowstone counties. The incumbent is Republican Barry Usher, who was elected to the 20th district in 2022 with 100% of the vote.

=== Republican primary ===
==== Candidates ====
===== Nominee =====
- Chris Rindal

===== Eliminated in primary =====
- Barry Usher, incumbent senator

=== Democratic primary ===
==== Candidates ====
===== Nominee =====
- Deanna Daigrepont

== District 22 ==
The 22nd district encompasses the northern outskirts of Billings. The incumbent is Republican Daniel Zolnikov, who was elected in 2022 with 65.7% of the vote.

=== Republican primary ===
==== Candidates ====
===== Nominee =====
- Daniel Zolnikov, incumbent senator

=== Democratic primary ===
==== Candidates ====
===== Removed from ballot =====
- Lyle Hedin

== District 23 ==
The 23rd district encompasses the city of Billings. The incumbent is Democrat Emma Kerr-Carpenter, who was appointed to the seat in December 2024, following the resignation of Katharin Kelker. Kelker was elected in 2022 with 56.0% of the vote.

=== Democratic primary ===
==== Candidates ====
===== Nominee =====
- Emma Kerr-Carpenter, incumbent senator

===== Removed from ballot =====
- Justin Kucera

=== Republican primary ===
==== Candidates ====
===== Nominee =====
- JoAnna Oblander

== District 25 ==
The 25th district encompasses the western outskirts of Billings. The incumbent is Republican Dennis Lenz, who was elected to the 27th district in 2022 with 100% of the vote.

=== Republican primary ===
==== Candidates ====
===== Nominee =====
- Dennis Lenz, incumbent senator

===== Eliminated in primary =====
- Tom Bick

=== Democratic primary ===
==== Candidates ====
===== Nominee =====
- Julie Hippler, educator

== District 28 ==
The 28th district includes all or portions of Carbon, Stillwater, and Sweet Grass counties. The incumbent is Republican Forrest Mandeville, who was elected to the 29th district in 2022 with 100% of the vote.

=== Republican primary ===
==== Candidates ====
===== Nominee =====
- Forrest Mandeville, incumbent senator

=== Democratic primary ===
==== Candidates ====
===== Nominee =====
- Kelly Hale

== District 29 ==
The 29th district includes all of Park County and a portion of Gallatin County, including the eastern outskirts of Bozeman. The incumbent is Republican John Esp, who is term-limited and cannot seek re-election to another term.

=== Republican primary ===
==== Candidates ====
===== Nominee =====
- Jason Gunderson, nominee for the 58th state representative district in 2024

===== Term-limited =====
- John Esp, incumbent senator

=== Democratic primary ===
==== Candidates ====
===== Nominee =====
- Scott Rosenzweig, state representative from the 57th district (2025–present)

== District 31 ==
The 31st district encompasses the city of Bozeman. The incumbent is Democrat Pat Flowers, the minority leader of the Montana Senate, who is term-limited and cannot seek re-election to another term.

=== Democratic primary ===
==== Candidates ====
===== Nominee =====
- Kathleen Williams, former state representative (2011–2017) from the 61st (2011–2015) and 65th districts (2015–2017)

===== Term-limited =====
- Pat Flowers, incumbent senator

=== Republican primary ===
==== Candidates ====
===== Nominee =====
- Richard Aungier

== District 32 ==
The 32nd district encompasses the northwestern outskirts of the city of Bozeman. The incumbent is Democrat Denise Hayman, who was elected to the 33rd district in 2022 with 67.9% of the vote.

=== Democratic primary ===
==== Candidates ====
===== Nominee =====
- Kelly Kortum, state representative from the 65th district (2021–present)

===== Eliminated in primary =====
- Becky Edwards, state representative from the 61st district (2025–present)

===== Removed from ballot =====
- Wes Siler

===== Declined =====
- Denise Hayman, incumbent senator

=== Republican primary ===
==== Candidates ====
===== Nominee =====
- Neal Ganser, businessowner and nominee for the 33rd state senate district in 2024 and the 61st state representative district in 2016

== District 34 ==
The 34th district includes a portion of Gallatin County, including the city of Belgrade. The incumbent is Republican Shelley Vance, who was elected in 2022 with 63.9% of the vote.

=== Republican primary ===
==== Candidates ====
===== Nominee =====
- Caleb Hinkle, state representative from the 68th district (2021–present)

===== Eliminated in primary =====
- Shelley Vance, incumbent senator

===== Withdrawn =====
- Randy Chamberlin

=== Democratic primary ===
==== Candidates ====
===== Nominee =====
- Carl Anderson

== District 41 ==
The 41st district encompasses the city of Helena. The incumbent is Democrat Janet Ellis, who is term-limited and cannot seek re-election to another term.

=== Democratic primary ===
==== Candidates ====
===== Nominee =====
- Erin Farris-Olsen, consultant and nominee for the Clerk of the Montana Supreme Court in 2024

===== Eliminated in primary =====
- Dana Toole, former member of the Helena School Board

===== Term-limited =====
- Janet Ellis, incumbent senator

=== Libertarian primary ===
==== Candidates ====
===== Nominee =====
- Dru Koester, businessowner

== District 42 ==
The 42nd district includes an eastern portion of Lewis and Clark County, including East Helena. The incumbent is Democrat Mary Ann Dunwell, who was elected in 2022 with 55.3% of the vote.

=== Democratic primary ===
==== Candidates ====
===== Nominee =====
- Mary Ann Dunwell, incumbent senator

=== Republican primary ===
==== Candidates ====
===== Nominee =====
- Stephen Lapraim

===== Eliminated in primary =====
- Nicholas Lancette
- Mike Talia

===== Withdrawn =====
- Kevin Kleinworth

== District 43 ==
The 43rd district encompasses most of Ravalli County, including the city of Hamilton. The incumbent is Republican Jason Ellsworth, who is term-limited and cannot run for re-election to another term.

=== Republican primary ===
==== Candidates ====
===== Nominee =====
- David Bedey, state representative from the 86th district (2019–present)

===== Eliminated in primary =====
- Kathy Love, state representative from the 85th district (2025–present)

===== Term-limited =====
- Jason Ellsworth, incumbent senator

=== Democratic primary ===
==== Candidates ====
===== Nominee =====
- Stephen Leuchtman

== District 48 ==
The 48th district encompasses the city of Missoula. The incumbent is Democrat Andrea Olsen, who was elected to the 50th district in 2022 with 72.6% of the vote.

=== Democratic primary ===
==== Candidates ====
===== Nominee =====
- Andrea Olsen, incumbent senator

== District 49 ==
The 49th district encompasses the western outskirts of Missoula. The incumbent is Democrat Willis Curdy, who was elected in 2022 with 54.4% of the vote.

=== Democratic primary ===
==== Candidates ====
===== Nominee =====
- Willis Curdy, incumbent senator

=== Republican primary ===
==== Candidates ====
===== Nominee =====
- Brad Tschida, state representative from the 97th district (2015–present)

== District 50 ==
The 50th district encompasses the northern outskirts of Missoula. The incumbent is Democrat Shane Morigeau, who was elected in 2022 with 63.9% of the vote.

=== Democratic primary ===
==== Candidates ====
===== Nominee =====
- Shane Morigeau, incumbent senator
