= 2014 Montana Senate election =

- November 4, 2014

25 out of 50 seats in the Montana Senate 26 seats needed for a majority
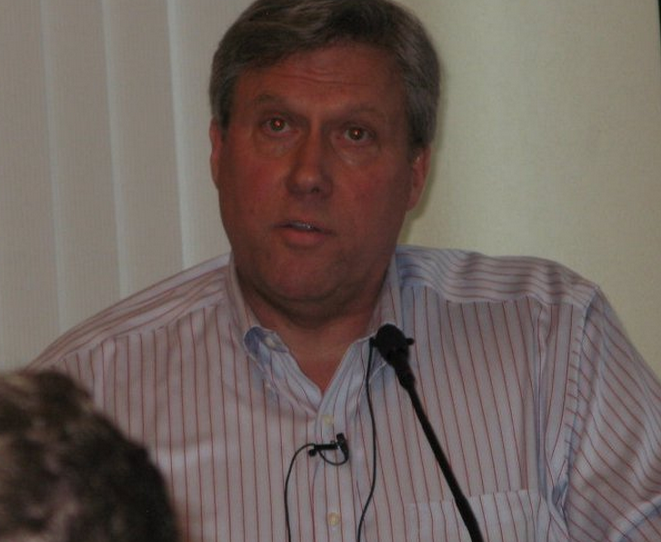

	Majority party	Minority party
Leader	Jeff Essmann (term-limited)	Jon Sesso
Party	Republican	Democratic
Leader since	January 7, 2013	January 5, 2013
Leader's seat	District 28	District 37
Last election	29	21
Seats after	29	21
Seat change	Steady	Steady
President before election
Jeff Essmann
Republican
Elected President
Debby Barrett
Republican

The 2014 Montana Senate election was held on November 4, 2014, to determine which party would control the Montana Senate for the following two years in the 64th Montana legislature. Twenty five out of 50 seats in the Montana Senate were up for election and the primary was held on June 3, 2014. Prior to the election, 29 seats were held by Republicans and 21 seats were held by Democrats. The general election saw neither party gain nor lose any seats, meaning Republicans maintained their majority in the State Senate.

== Predictions ==
Source	Ranking	As of
Governing	Likely R	October 20, 2014

== Retirements ==
=== Democrats ===
1. District 8: Shannon Augare retired.
2. District 11: Anders Blewett retired.
3. District 12: Mitch Tropila was term-limited.
4. District 32: Larry Jent was term-limited.
5. District 49: David Wanzenried was term-limited.

=== Republicans ===
1. District 4: Jon Sonju retired.
2. District 5: Verdell Jackson was term-limited.
3. District 29: Edward Walker retired.
4. District 30: Jason Priest retired.
5. District 34: Art Wittich retired.
6. District 42: Dave Lewis was term-limited.

== Closest races ==
Seats where the margin of victory was under 10%:

1. District 49, 0.40%
2. District 13, 2.18%
3. District 11, 6.20%
4. District 12, 7.38%
5. District 42, 7.72% (gain)
6. District 24, 8.02% (gain)

== Results ==
=== District 1 ===
District 1 election, 2014
Party	Candidate	Votes	%
Republican	Chas Vincent (incumbent)	5,583	77.02%
Democratic	Terence Gill	1,666	22.98%
Total votes		7,249	100.0%
Republican hold			

=== District 4 ===
District 4 election, 2014
Party	Candidate	Votes	%
Republican	Mark Blasdel	3,960	68.32%
Democratic	Diane Taylor	1,836	31.68%
Total votes		5,796	100.0%
Republican hold			

=== District 5 ===
District 5 election, 2014
Party	Candidate	Votes	%
Republican	Bob Keenan	5,129	73.93%
Democratic	Daniel King	1,809	26.07%
Total votes		6,938	100.0%
Republican hold			

=== District 8 ===
District 8 election, 2014
Party	Candidate	Votes	%
Democratic	Lea Whitford	2,713	67.69%
Republican	Liane Johnson	1,295	32.31%
Total votes		4,008	100.0%
Democratic hold			

=== District 9 ===
District 9 election, 2014
Party	Candidate	Votes	%
Republican	Llew Jones (incumbent)	5,647	75.82%
Democratic	David Brownell	1,801	24.18%
Total votes		7,448	100.0%
Republican hold			

=== District 11 ===
District 11 election, 2014
Party	Candidate	Votes	%
Republican	Edward Buttrey (incumbent)	3,494	53.90%
Democratic	Vonnie Brown	2,988	46.10%
Total votes		6,482	100.0%
Republican hold			

=== District 12 ===
District 12 election, 2014
Party	Candidate	Votes	%
Democratic	Mary Sheehy Moe	3,010	53.69%
Republican	Sheridan Buck	2,596	46.31%
Total votes		5,606	100.0%
Democratic hold			

=== District 13 ===
District 13 election, 2014
Party	Candidate	Votes	%
Republican	Brian Hoven	2,385	51.09%
Democratic	Carlie Boland	2,283	48.91%
Total votes		4,668	100.0%
Republican hold			

=== District 14 ===
District 14 election, 2014
Party	Candidate	Votes	%
Republican	Kris Hansen	4,080	56.07%
Democratic	Greg Jergeson (incumbent)	3,196	43.93%
Total votes		7,276	100.0%
Republican gain from Democratic			

=== District 19 ===
District 19 election, 2014
Party	Candidate	Votes	%
Republican	Frederick Moore (incumbent)	5,222	68.17%
Democratic	Bill McChesney	2,438	31.83%
Total votes		7,660	100.0%
Republican hold			

=== District 20 ===
District 20 election, 2014
Party	Candidate	Votes	%
Republican	Duane Ankney	6,279	81.27%
Democratic	Hod O'Donnell	1,447	18.73%
Total votes		7,726	100.0%
Republican hold			

=== District 22 ===
District 22 election, 2014
Party	Candidate	Votes	%
Republican	Doug Kary	4,106	64.30%
Democratic	Steven Fugate	2,280	35.70%
Total votes		6,386	100.0%
Republican hold			

=== District 24 ===
District 24 election, 2014
Party	Candidate	Votes	%
Democratic	Mary McNally	3,581	54.01%
Republican	Tonya Shellnutt	3,049	45.99%
Total votes		6,630	100.0%
Democratic gain from Republican			

=== District 27 ===
District 27 election, 2014
Party	Candidate	Votes	%
Republican	Cary Smith	6,351	71.71%
Democratic	Eric Johnson	2,506	28.29%
Total votes		8,857	100.0%
Republican hold			

=== District 29 ===
District 29 election, 2014
Party	Candidate	Votes	%
Republican	David Howard	5,605	66.06%
Democratic	Elli Elliott	2,879	33.94%
Total votes		8,484	100.0%
Republican hold			

=== District 30 ===
District 30 election, 2014
Party	Candidate	Votes	%
Republican	Nels Swandal	5,861	68.59%
Democratic	Mary Murphy	2,684	31.41%
Total votes		8,545	100.0%
Republican hold			

=== District 32 ===
District 32 election, 2014
Party	Candidate	Votes	%
Republican	Jedediah Hinkle	3,840	55.89%
Democratic	Franke Wilmer	3,030	44.11%
Total votes		6,870	100.0%
Republican gain from Democratic			

=== District 33 ===
District 33 election, 2014
Party	Candidate	Votes	%
Democratic	Jennifer Pomnichowski	4,012	57.84%
Republican	Bryan Rogan	2,474	35.66%
Libertarian	Joan Stanley	451	6.50%
Total votes		6,937	100.0%
Democratic hold			

=== District 34 ===
District 34 election, 2014
Party	Candidate	Votes	%
Republican	Gordon Vance	4,518	69.71%
Democratic	April Buonamici	1,963	30.29%
Total votes		6,481	100.0%
Republican hold			

=== District 41 ===
District 41 election, 2014
Party	Candidate	Votes	%
Democratic	Mary Caferro (incumbent)	5,888	100.0%
Total votes		5,888	100.0%
Democratic hold			

=== District 42 ===
District 42 election, 2014
Party	Candidate	Votes	%
Democratic	Jill Cohenour	4,028	53.86%
Republican	Joe Dooling	3,451	46.14%
Total votes		7,479	100.0%
Democratic gain from Republican			

=== District 43 ===
District 43 election, 2014
Party	Candidate	Votes	%
Republican	Pat Connell	5,929	70.80%
Democratic	Robert Schumacher	2,445	29.20%
Total votes		8,374	100.0%
Republican hold			

=== District 48 ===
District 48 election, 2014
Party	Candidate	Votes	%
Democratic	Cynthia Wolken	3,528	57.67%
Republican	Mike Hopkins	2,590	42.33%
Total votes		6,118	100.0%
Democratic hold			

=== District 49 ===
District 49 election, 2014
Party	Candidate	Votes	%
Democratic	Diane Sands	3,933	50.20%
Republican	Dick Haines	3,902	49.80%
Total votes		7,835	100.0%
Democratic hold			

=== District 50 ===
District 50 election, 2014
Party	Candidate	Votes	%
Democratic	Tom Facey (incumbent)	6,020	100.0%
Total votes		6,020	100.0%
Democratic hold			
