= Paul Tuss =

American politician

Member of the Montana House of Representatives from the 27th district
- Incumbent
- Assumed office January 6, 2025
- Preceded by: Joshua Kassmier

Member of the Montana House of Representatives from the 28th district
- In office January 2, 2023 – January 6, 2025
- Preceded by: Ed Hill
- Succeeded by: Eric Albus

Personal details
- Born: 1964 or 1965 (age 60–61) Anaconda, Montana, U.S.
- Party: Democratic
- Spouse: Pam Hillery
- Children: 2
- Education: University of Montana

Paul Tuss (born 1964/1965) is an American Democratic politician serving as a member of the Montana House of Representatives for the 27th district. Elected in November 2022, he assumed office on January 2, 2023.

== Personal life ==
Tuss, the youngest of five children of Mary Jane and Walter Tuss, was born in Anaconda, Montana, and grew up in nearby Opportunity. He graduated from Anaconda High School and received his bachelor's degree in political science from the University of Montana (UM) in 1988. Tuss was a member of Alpha Tau Omega, UM Advocates, and the College Democrats, and was named one of the 1986 Outstanding Young Men of America.

Tuss met his wife, Pam Hillery, while studying at UM. They were married for 27 years before her death in 2016. The couple had a son named Dolan and a daughter named Caroline.

== Career ==
Tuss worked in economic development in rural northern Montana. He was the executive director of the Bear Paw Development Corporation for over 20 years and chaired organizations like the Montana Board of Regents of Higher Education and the Montana Economic Developers Association. Tuss also served on boards for the Havre Area Chamber of Commerce, the Northern Montana Hospital, the Montana Cooperative Development Center and the Evergreen Chapter of the ALS Association.

Tuss ran for Secretary of State of Montana in 2000, losing in the Democratic primary to Hal Harper. During the 2000 presidential election, Tuss was a Montana state co-chair of GoreNet. GoreNet was a group that supported the Al Gore campaign with a focus on grassroots and online organizing as well as hosting small dollar donor events.

In 2018, Tuss challenged Republican incumbent Russel Tempel for his Montana Senate seat representing the 14th district, losing the race by 132 votes. After conceding the race, Tuss said he "certainly [did not] have any interest in running in the near future."

In February 2022, Tuss announced his candidacy in the 2022 election to represent the 28th district in the Montana House of Representatives. Tuss was elected to the seat in November, defeating Republican incumbent Ed Hill by ten points. Arren Kimbel-Sannit of the Montana Free Press called his win the "biggest surprise victory for Democrats" in the House.

In 2024, Tuss campaigned for his reelection to a second term in the House. Due to redistricting, Tuss ran to represent the 27th district, rather than the 28th. He defeated Ed Hill in an electoral rematch.

Tuss is running unchallenged in his 2026 reelection campaign after no Republican or primary-election opponents declared their candidacy before the Montana filing deadline.

== Electoral history ==
=== 2000 ===
2000 Montana Secretary of State election
Primary election
Party	Candidate	Votes	%
Democratic	Hal Harper	51,969	63.02
Democratic	Paul Tuss	30,494	36.98
Total votes		82,463	100.0

=== 2018 ===
2018 Montana's 14th State Senate district election
Primary election
Party	Candidate	Votes	%
Democratic	Paul Tuss	1,987	100.0
Total votes		1,987	100.0
General election
Republican	Russel Tempel (incumbent)	4,526	50.74%
Democratic	Paul Tuss	4,394	49.26%
Total votes		8,920	100%
Republican hold			

=== 2022 ===
2022 Montana's 28th House district election
Primary election
Party	Candidate	Votes	%
Democratic	Paul Tuss	755	100.0
Total votes		755	100.0
General election
Democratic	Paul Tuss	1,793	54.53%
Republican	Ed Hill (incumbent)	1,495	45.47%
Total votes		3,288	100%
Democratic gain from Republican			

=== 2024 ===
2024 Montana's 27th House district election
Primary election
Party	Candidate	Votes	%
Democratic	Paul Tuss	870	100.0
Total votes		870	100.0
General election
Democratic	Paul Tuss	2,635	52.7%
Republican	Ed Hill	2,361	47.3%
Total votes		3,288	100%
Democratic gain from Republican			
