= Scott Sales =

American politician

President of the Montana Senate
- In office January 2, 2017 – January 4, 2021
- Preceded by: Debby Barrett
- Succeeded by: Mark Blasdel

Member of the Montana Senate
- In office January 5, 2015 – January 4, 2021
- Preceded by: Art Wittich
- Succeeded by: Walt Sales
- Constituency: 35th District
- In office January 7, 2013 – January 5, 2015
- Preceded by: Joe Balyeat
- Succeeded by: Gordon Vance
- Constituency: 34th District

Speaker of the Montana House of Representatives
- In office January 3, 2007 – January 5, 2009
- Preceded by: Gary Matthews
- Succeeded by: Bob Bergren

Member of the Montana House of Representatives from the 68th district
- In office January 6, 2003 – January 3, 2011
- Preceded by: David Wanzenried
- Succeeded by: Kelly Flynn

Personal details
- Born: July 26, 1960 (age 65) Douglas, Wyoming, U.S.
- Party: Republican
- Children: 3
- Education: Boise State University (BA)

Scott Sales (born July 26, 1960) is an American politician of the Republican Party. He is a state senator in the Montana Senate and also serves as the president of that body. He previously served in the Montana House of Representatives, including a term as minority leader and as speaker of the House. Sales is the first person, to be elected by his peers, to serve as the presiding officer of both bodies of the Montana Legislature. Sales is from Douglas, Wyoming.

== Life and career before politics ==
Sales was born in Douglas, Wyoming, in 1960, and grew up near Boise, Idaho. He graduated from Boise State University in 1982, with a bachelor's degree in industrial business. He then worked for Hewlett-Packard and then a technology start-up, Extended Systems. Sales moved to Bozeman, Montana, in 1992, when Extended Systems established an office in the city. When the company was in the process of being acquired in 2001, by a larger public company, Sales sold his stock in the company and remained in Bozeman. As of 2007, Sales raised a small number of cattle and grew about 60 acres of hay near Bozeman, although he did not "consider himself a farmer or rancher." In 2012, his occupation was given in the Helena Independent Record as "private investor." As of 2016, Sales was "more or less retired."

== Political career ==
Sales has been described as an "outspoken conservative" and an "ultraconservative." At the time Sales was selected by his Republican colleagues in 2006 to serve as speaker of the House, the Billings Gazette described him as "easily one of the body's most conservative members." He is a supporter of the Tea Party movement, favors budget cuts and tax cuts, supports "right-to-work" legislation, and expanded gun rights. Sales praised Sarah Palin in 2009, saying: "I think she should be part of the discourse and part of the process." Sales criticized the Affordable Care Act and in the Montana Legislature voted against accepting the act's Medicaid expansion, stating, "There is no constitutional guarantee to healthcare."

=== State House of Representatives ===
Sales spent three terms in the Montana House of Representatives; his district, State House District 68, covered the northern part of Gallatin County and most of Broadwater County. In his first term, Sales introduced 10 pieces of legislation, only one of which became law. Among the measures introduced by Sales as a freshman legislator was H.B. 281, a bill to eliminate the office of the commissioner of higher education; the bill died.

Sales was elected speaker of the Montana House of Representatives in 2007. At the time Sales became House speaker, he was relatively inexperienced; he assumed leadership of the chamber in just his second term and had never served as a committee chair. As speaker, Sales clashed with Governor Brian Schweitzer, opposing his budget proposal. Sales presided over a House controlled by Republicans by the thinnest of margins: during his term, there were 50 Republican representatives, one Constitution Party representative (Rick Jore) who was mostly allied with Republicans, and 49 Democratic representatives. The highly contentious legislative session ended in disarray, as the Legislature failed to pass a state budget, as required by the state constitution. In the ensuing special session, the budget was approved after Governor Schweitzer negotiated a compromise with several moderate House Republicans, effectively circumventing Sales.

Sales was House minority leader in 2009, during a session when the House was evenly divided between Democrats and Republicans. During his opening speech in 2009, Sales read out eight quotations and attributed them to Abraham Lincoln, although Lincoln in fact never said them. Once the spurious origin of the quotations were brought to light, Sales said that he had "got them off the Internet" and had no intention to mislead. Sales raised a point of personal privilege in the House to apologize.

=== Unsuccessful campaign for Gallatin County Commission ===
He was ineligible to run for a fourth House term in 2010 due to term limits. He unsuccessfully ran for Gallatin County Commission in 2010, being defeated by incumbent commissioner Joe Skinner in the Republican primary election.

=== Americans for Prosperity ===
In 2011 Sales was formerly the Montana state director for Americans for Prosperity, a Koch brothers-founded advocacy group. In an op-ed, Sales criticized U.S. Environmental Protection Agency regulations to combat climate change (calling them a "power grab") and expressed strong opposition to a cap-and-trade system for carbon emissions.

=== State Senate ===
In 2015, Sales successfully introduced legislation, which he co-drafted the year before, to raise the speed limit on highways such as Interstate 90 to 80 mph.

Also in 2015, Sales voted against privacy legislation introduced by Senator Daniel Zolnikov to restrict the state government's digital collection and use of individuals' data. The bills specifically would have prohibited the state or local governments from using automatic license-plate readers and would have required authorities to obtain a search warrants in order to obtain electronic communications held on electronic devices or by Internet service providers. Sales stated that the bill would "encumber law enforcement from some activities that I don't think are abusive at this time" and were "solutions to problems that don't exist in Montana at this point."

==== State Senate president ====
In November 2016, Sales won an internal election among state Senate Republicans to be the president of the Montana Senate in the 2017 election. His opponent was Senator Eric Moore of Miles City. Although the vote was by secret ballot, it was described as a close case. He assumed office in January 2017. Sales broke with tradition in January 2017 by deciding to not sit with the state House in the customary beginning-of-session joint sitting to hear speeches from members of Montana's congressional delegation, the chief justice of the Montana Supreme Court, the Montana Superintendent of Public Instruction, and a Native American leader. Sales' choice to break from tradition was publicly criticized by former State Senate president Jon Tester.

After Republican U.S. Representative Ryan Zinke was appointed U.S. Secretary of the Interior in 2017, Sales considered running for the open seat in the special election to fill the vacancy, but decided not to run. During his brief exploration of a candidacy, Sales said that if elected he would take a hard line on illegal immigration and would be "certainly more fiscally conservative than Ryan Zinke," saying that he would not vote for continuing resolutions as Zinke did.

As Senate president, Sales took the leading role in supporting legislation to give state lawmakers the right to carry concealed firearms in the state Capitol and on other state property and allowing restaurant customers to carry concealed firearms to restaurants. Both bills were passed by the Senate on mostly party lines, with Republicans in favor and Democrats opposed.

As Senate president, Sales opposed legislation to fund infrastructure projects in Montana, saying that he generally opposed bond issues and preferred to spend cash on state building projects.

In March 2017, Sales said that he generally support privatizing the Montana State Fund (a semi-public entity that is the state's largest provider of workers' compensation insurance), but also said that he would consider supporting legislation to eliminate the fund entirely.

In 2017, Sales opposed legislation to require motorists to maintain a distance of 3 feet from bicyclists at 35 mph or less, and 5 feet at faster speeds. In debate, Sales harshly attacked cyclists, calling them "some of the most self-centered, rude people navigating on the highways and county roads I’ve seen" and saying that there were "too many of them" in Montana. Sales' remarks prompted Derek Bouchard-Hall, the president and CEO of USA Cycling, to write an open letter to Sales expressing disappointment.

== Ethics complaint and settlement ==
In 2014, a political practice complaint against Sales was filed in Montana state court by the Montana Commissioner of Political Practices, who "alleged illegal coordination with a pro-industry, anti-environmental group that used unreported 'dark money' to influence Montana elections." The complaint was filed one month before the statute of limitation expired and Sales was investigated and exonerated in 2013 by former Commissioner Murray on the same complaint. In late December 2014, Sales negotiated a settlement with COPP, in which he agreed to pay a $500 fine and expressed "regret" for "lack of judgment regarding my association with, and campaign use of," the group. In 2017, Sales and other Republican leaders in the state legislature sought to withhold the salary of Commissioner of Political Practices Jonathan Motl, who had pursued the case against Sales; the maneuver came "amid a legal dispute over the commissioner's term of office."

== Electoral history ==
2016 General Election for Montana's 34th State Senate District
Party	Candidate	Votes	%
Republican	Scott Sales (incumbent)	9,408	100.00
Total votes		9,408	100

2012 General Election for Montana's 34th State Senate District
Party	Candidate	Votes	%
Republican	Scott Sales	7,994	64.27
Democratic	Michael B Comstock	4,444	35.73
Total votes		12,438	100

2008 General Election for Montana's 68th House of Representatives District
Party	Candidate	Votes	%
Republican	Scott Sales (incumbent)	2,644	61.35
Democratic	Robert Brastrup	1,666	38.65
Total votes		4,310	100

2006 General Election for Montana's 68th House of Representatives District
Party	Candidate	Votes	%
Republican	Scott Sales (incumbent)	2,915	60.00
Democratic	Laura Obert	1,943	40.00
Total votes		4,858	100

2004 General Election for Montana's 68th House of Representatives District
Party	Candidate	Votes	%
Republican	Scott Sales (incumbent)	3,309	64.65
Democratic	David Tyler	1,809	35.35
Total votes		5,118	100

2002 General Election for Montana's 27th House of Representatives District
Party	Candidate	Votes	%
Republican	Scott Sales	3,135	54.01
Democratic	Art Carlson	2,670	45.99
Total votes		5,805	100

== See also ==
- Montana State Legislature
- Montana United States Senate election, 2008

Political offices
Preceded by Gary Matthews	Speaker of the Montana House of Representatives; 2007–2009	Succeeded by Bob Bergren
Preceded by Debby Barrett	President of the Montana Senate; 2017–2021	Succeeded by Mark Blasdel
