= Anders Blewett =

American politician and attorney

Member of the Montana Senate from the 11th district
- In office January 3, 2011 – January 5, 2015
- Preceded by: Trudi Schmidt
- Succeeded by: Edward Buttrey

Member of the Montana House of Representatives from the 21st district
- In office January 5, 2009 – January 3, 2011
- Succeeded by: Jean Price

Personal details
- Born: August 18, 1980 (age 46) Great Falls, Montana
- Party: Democratic Party
- Education: Harvard University, University of Montana School of Law
- Profession: Attorney

Anders Blewett (born August 18, 1980 in Great Falls, Montana) is an attorney and a Montana Democratic politician. He was elected to the Montana House of Representatives in 2008 and the Montana Senate in 2010.

Blewett is an associate attorney at the law firm of Hoyt and Blewett PLLC, where he specializes in representing injured individuals in cases involving railroad FELA, railroad crossings, insurance bad faith, safe place to work, insurance, nuisances, environmental pollution, medical malpractice, and wrongful death. He is currently a resident of Great Falls, Montana.

== Legislation ==
Among the bills Blewett sponsored which have passed into law include House Bill 315 which reduces taxes for low income retirees on pensions and “The Fair Arbitrators Act” which reforms Montana’s arbitration process by requiring arbitrators to make enhanced disclosures relating to conflicts of interest and prior arbitrations. Blewett was also a co-sponsor of the 2009 Montana Stream Access Law. The law, which protects the public's right to access Montana's rivers and streams from public bridges, was widely viewed as one of the most important bills passed in the 2009 legislature.

Since his election in 2008, Blewett has advocated for the removal of BNSF railcars from Montana's Missouri River corridor. His efforts have been supported by the editorial board of the Great Falls Tribune. In April 2010, BNSF indicated it would remove half of the stored railcars from the Missouri River Corridor.

Blewett has also introduced legislation which would impose stricter penalties on owners of vicious dogs in rural areas.

== Football career ==
Blewett played football at Harvard University where he lettered two years and started at placekicker on Harvard’s 2001 Ivy League Championship team. He also played arena football for the Billings Outlaws helping the Outlaws win the 2006 National Indoor Football League Championship.

== Family politics ==
Anders Blewett is the fourth member of his family to serve in the Montana House of Representatives. Blewett’s grandfather, Alex Blewett Jr., a Republican from Great Falls, served in the Montana House of Representatives as a Republican in 1961 and 1963. In 1963, he served as Republican Majority Leader of the State House. In 1964, he unsuccessfully challenged Democratic incumbent Mike Mansfield for the U.S. Senate. Blewett’s great grandfather, Alexander Blewett Sr., a Republican from Butte, served in the Montana House of Representatives in 1931, 1943, 1945, 1947, and 1951. Blewett’s great uncle, Paul Friedl, a Democrat from Glasgow, served in the Montana House of Representatives in 1939 and 1941.
