= Steve Gibson (politician) =

American politician

Member of the Montana House of Representatives from the 78th district
- In office January 3, 2011 – January 5, 2015
- Preceded by: Jill Cohenour
- Succeeded by: Gordon Pierson

Personal details
- Party: Republican

Steve Gibson

Mayor, Stevensville MT
- Preceded by: Brandon E. Dewey
- Succeeded by: Bob Michelson

Steve Gibson is a Republican member of the Montana Legislature. He was elected to House District 78 which represents the East Helena area.
