= 2014 Montana House of Representatives election =

- November 4, 2014

All 100 seats of the Montana House of Representatives 51 seats needed for a majority
- Registered: 674,264 ▼1.08%
- Turnout: 55.44% ▼16.74%
	Majority party	Minority party
Leader	Austin Knudsen	Chuck Hunter
Party	Republican	Democratic
Leader's seat	34th district	83rd district
Last election	61	39
Seats won	59	41
Seat change	▼2	▲2
Popular vote	186,488	156,894
Percentage	53.62%	45.12%
Swing	▼3.96%	▲4.58%
- Results: Republican gain Democratic gain Republican hold Democratic hold
Speaker before election
Mark Blasdel
Republican
Elected Speaker
Austin Knudsen
Republican

An election was held on November 4, 2014 to elect all 100 members to Montana's House of Representatives. The election coincided with elections for other offices, including U.S. Senate, U.S. House of Representatives and State Senate. The primary election was held on June 3, 2014.

Republicans retained control of the House despite a net loss of two seats, winning 59 seats compared to 41 seats for the Democrats.

== Predictions ==
Source	Ranking	As of
Governing	Safe R	October 20, 2014

== Results ==
=== Statewide ===
Statewide results of the 2014 Montana House of Representatives election:

Party	Candi- dates	Votes			Seats		
Party	Candi- dates	No.	%	+/–	No.	+/–	%
Republican Party	83	186,488	53.62%	▼3.96%	59	▼2	59.00%
Democratic Party	99	156,894	45.12%	▲4.58%	41	▲2	41.00%
Independent	2	2,974	0.86%	▼0.12%	0	Steady	0.00%
Constitution Party	1	775	0.22%	New	0	Steady	0.00%
Libertarian Party	4	633	0.18%	▼0.72%	0	Steady	0.00%
Total	189	347,764	100.00%	Steady	100	Steady	100.00%

=== District ===
Results of the 2014 Montana House of Representatives election by district:

District	Democratic		Republican		Others		Total votes	Result
District	Votes	%	Votes	%	Votes	%	Total votes	Result
1st district	847	24.32%	2,636	75.68%	—	—	3,483	Republican hold
2nd district	867	23.10%	2,887	76.90%	—	—	3,754	Republican hold
3rd district	1,558	48.60%	1,510	47.10%	138	4.30%	3,206	Democratic gain
4th district	916	25.63%	2,658	74.37%	—	—	3,574	Republican gain
5th district	2,160	54.93%	1,772	45.07%	—	—	3,932	Democratic gain
6th district	1,170	29.51%	2,795	70.49%	—	—	3,965	Republican hold
7th district	849	33.24%	1,705	66.76%	—	—	2,554	Republican hold
8th district	945	29.36%	2,274	70.64%	—	—	3,219	Republican hold
9th district	774	28.84%	1,910	71.16%	—	—	2,684	Republican hold
10th district	1,153	27.99%	2,966	72.01%	—	—	4,119	Republican hold
11th district	774	21.93%	2,755	78.07%	—	—	3,529	Republican hold
12th district	1,367	33.65%	2,695	66.35%	—	—	4,062	Republican hold
13th district	1,143	29.20%	2,772	70.80%	—	—	3,915	Republican hold
14th district	1,009	28.45%	2,537	71.55%	—	—	3,546	Republican hold
15th district	1,043	57.37%	—	—	775	42.63%	1,818	Democratic hold
16th district	1,183	55.10%	964	44.90%	—	—	2,147	Democratic hold
17th district	1,310	31.54%	2,844	68.46%	—	—	4,154	Republican hold
18th district	—	—	2,789	100.00%	—	—	2,789	Republican hold
19th district	1,251	35.26%	2,297	64.74%	—	—	3,548	Republican hold
20th district	1,532	34.23%	2,944	65.77%	—	—	4,476	Republican hold
21st district	1,898	53.87%	1,625	46.13%	—	—	3,523	Democratic hold
22nd district	2,316	100.00%	—	—	—	—	2,316	Democratic hold
23rd district	1,259	49.68%	1,275	50.32%	—	—	2,534	Republican gain
24th district	1,577	50.37%	1,554	49.63%	—	—	3,131	Democratic gain
25th district	1,435	51.97%	1,326	48.03%	—	—	2,761	Democratic hold
26th district	1,115	58.84%	780	41.16%	—	—	1,895	Democratic hold
27th district	1,116	28.03%	2,866	71.97%	—	—	3,982	Republican hold
28th district	1,498	47.78%	1,637	52.22%	—	—	3,135	Republican hold
29th district	1,309	31.87%	2,798	68.13%	—	—	4,107	Republican hold
30th district	1,067	25.86%	3,059	74.14%	—	—	4,126	Republican hold
31st district	1,818	100.00%	—	—	—	—	1,818	Democratic hold
32nd district	1,041	46.18%	1,213	53.82%	—	—	2,254	Republican gain
33rd district	894	24.47%	2,759	75.53%	—	—	3,653	Republican hold
34th district	1,022	23.76%	3,279	76.24%	—	—	4,301	Republican hold
35th district	674	20.51%	2,612	79.49%	—	—	3,286	Republican hold
36th district	1,039	28.03%	2,668	71.97%	—	—	3,707	Republican hold
37th district	902	19.91%	3,629	80.09%	—	—	4,531	Republican hold
38th district	1,497	46.69%	1,709	53.31%	—	—	3,206	Republican hold
39th district	893	23.08%	2,976	76.92%	—	—	3,869	Republican hold
40th district	881	22.67%	3,006	77.33%	—	—	3,887	Republican gain
41st district	1,512	100.00%	—	—	—	—	1,512	Democratic hold
42nd district	2,391	100.00%	—	—	—	—	2,391	Democratic hold
43rd district	1,366	43.74%	1,757	56.26%	—	—	3,123	Republican hold
44th district	1,479	43.99%	1,883	56.01%	—	—	3,362	Republican hold
45th district	971	28.02%	2,494	71.98%	—	—	3,465	Republican hold
46th district	1,515	33.95%	2,948	66.05%	—	—	4,463	Republican hold
47th district	1,701	56.16%	1,328	43.84%	—	—	3,029	Democratic gain
48th district	1,889	52.34%	1,720	47.66%	—	—	3,609	Democratic gain
49th district	1,289	55.70%	1,025	44.30%	—	—	2,314	Democratic hold
50th district	1,657	57.02%	1,249	42.98%	—	—	2,906	Democratic gain
51st district	1,324	50.25%	1,311	49.75%	—	—	2,635	Democratic hold
52nd district	1,322	46.85%	1,500	53.15%	—	—	2,822	Republican gain
53rd district	1,177	23.74%	3,781	76.26%	—	—	4,958	Republican hold
54th district	1,195	29.88%	2,598	64.95%	207	5.18%	4,000	Republican gain
55th district	1,304	38.72%	2,064	61.28%	—	—	3,368	Republican hold
56th district	1,084	34.47%	2,061	65.53%	—	—	3,145	Republican hold
57th district	819	21.17%	3,049	78.83%	—	—	3,868	Republican hold
58th district	1,871	40.28%	2,774	59.72%	—	—	4,645	Republican hold
59th district	1,319	28.84%	3,255	71.16%	—	—	4,574	Republican hold
60th district	1,894	48.27%	2,030	51.73%	—	—	3,924	Republican hold
61st district	2,975	57.63%	2,187	42.37%	—	—	5,162	Democratic gain
62nd district	2,890	63.27%	1,678	36.73%	—	—	4,568	Democratic hold
63rd district	1,522	60.64%	988	39.36%	—	—	2,510	Democratic hold
64th district	1,635	38.68%	2,592	61.32%	—	—	4,227	Republican gain
65th district	1,944	56.64%	1,488	43.36%	—	—	3,432	Democratic hold
66th district	2,186	64.48%	1,204	35.52%	—	—	3,390	Democratic hold
67th district	1,027	32.32%	2,151	67.68%	—	—	3,178	Republican hold
68th district	1,003	30.78%	2,256	69.22%	—	—	3,259	Republican hold
69th district	1,127	27.22%	3,014	72.78%	—	—	4,141	Republican hold
70th district	1,210	27.25%	3,231	72.75%	—	—	4,441	Republican hold
71st district	1,196	26.11%	3,385	73.89%	—	—	4,581	Republican hold
72nd district	886	20.48%	3,440	79.52%	—	—	4,326	Republican hold
73rd district	2,861	100.00%	—	—	—	—	2,861	Democratic hold
74th district	1,623	56.02%	—	—	1,274	43.98%	2,897	Democratic hold
75th district	1,762	39.58%	2,690	60.42%	—	—	4,452	Republican gain
76th district	3,614	100.00%	—	—	—	—	3,614	Democratic hold
77th district	3,145	100.00%	—	—	—	—	3,145	Democratic gain
78th district	1,857	64.73%	1,012	35.27%	—	—	2,869	Democratic gain
79th district	2,712	61.18%	1,721	38.82%	—	—	4,433	Democratic hold
80th district	1,135	27.51%	2,794	67.72%	197	4.77%	4,126	Republican hold
81st district	2,207	58.48%	1,567	41.52%	—	—	3,774	Democratic hold
82nd district	2,179	52.48%	1,973	47.52%	—	—	4,152	Democratic hold
83rd district	2,861	100.00%	—	—	—	—	2,861	Democratic gain
84th district	1,885	50.31%	1,862	49.69%	—	—	3,747	Democratic gain
85th district	1,431	31.93%	3,051	68.07%	—	—	4,482	Republican gain
86th district	1,601	39.55%	2,447	60.45%	—	—	4,048	Republican gain
87th district	1,120	28.34%	2,832	71.66%	—	—	3,952	Republican hold
88th district	1,400	36.38%	2,448	63.62%	—	—	3,848	Republican hold
89th district	2,455	100.00%	—	—	—	—	2,455	Democratic gain
90th district	2,779	100.00%	—	—	—	—	2,779	Democratic gain
91st district	3,703	100.00%	—	—	—	—	3,703	Democratic gain
92nd district	1,714	46.97%	1,935	53.03%	—	—	3,649	Republican gain
93rd district	1,323	41.80%	1,842	58.20%	—	—	3,165	Republican gain
94th district	1,748	50.70%	—	—	1,700	49.30%	3,448	Democratic hold
95th district	2,226	100.00%	—	—	—	—	2,226	Democratic hold
96th district	1,819	52.02%	1,678	47.98%	—	—	3,497	Democratic hold
97th district	1,749	43.20%	2,209	54.56%	91	2.25%	4,049	Republican gain
98th district	2,266	60.09%	1,505	39.91%	—	—	3,771	Democratic hold
99th district	2,685	100.00%	—	—	—	—	2,685	Democratic hold
100th district	3,252	100.00%	—	—	—	—	3,252	Democratic gain
Total	156,894	45.12%	186,488	53.62%	4,382	1.26%	347,764	
