= Tom L. Burnett =

American politician (born 1954)

Member of the Montana House of Representatives
- In office January 5, 2015 – January 4, 2021
- Preceded by: Gordon Vance
- Succeeded by: Jedediah Hinkle
- Constituency: 67th District

Member of the Montana House of Representatives 63rd District
- In office January 7, 2013 – January 5, 2015
- Preceded by: Jennifer Pomnichowski

Personal details
- Born: January 1, 1954 (age 72) Sheridan, Montana
- Party: Republican
- Education: Montana State University
- Occupation: Business owner

Tom L. Burnett (born January 1, 1954) is an American politician and a Republican Party former member of the Montana House of Representatives. He represented District 63 from 2013 to 2015, and District 67 from 2015 to 2021.

Born in Sheridan, Montana, Burnett is a graduate of Montana State University. Burnett owned and operated a small business, Marathon Seat Covers, from 1978 until March 2007.

== Early life, education, and career ==
Burnett was born in Sheridan, Montana and raised in Bozeman, Montana. He is the son of Darwin Burnett, a school teacher, and Barbara Burnett, a full-time homemaker. He graduated from Bozeman Senior High School. Burnett received his undergraduate degree in agriculture from Montana State University, where he graduated with honors.

He was unsuccessful in his first race for Montana District 63, losing in 2008 to Jennifer Pomnichowski. He ran again in 2010 against Jennifer Pomnichowski and was elected. In 2012 he was defeated by Franke Wilmer.

In 2014 he was elected as Representative of District 67, beating Jeannie Brown. He ran again in 2016 beating Mike Houghton.
