= 2026 Montana Public Service Commission election =

- November 3, 2026

2 of 5 seats on the Montana Public Service Commission 3 seats needed for a majority
Party	Republican	Democratic
Current seats	5	0

The 2026 Montana Public Service Commission election was held on November 3, 2026, to elect two members to the Montana Public Service Commission. Primary elections were held on June 2.

== District 1 ==
=== Republican primary ===
==== Candidates ====
===== Nominee =====
- Jeff Pattison, former state representative (2001–2003)

===== Eliminated in primary =====
- Jeremy Trebas, state senator from the 10th district (2023–present)

===== Declined =====
- Randy Pinocci, incumbent commissioner (running for state senate)

==== Results ====
Republican primary results
Party	Candidate	Votes	%
Republican	Jeff Pattison	22,077	66.6
Republican	Jeremy Trebas	11,076	33.4
Total votes		33,153	100.0

=== Democratic primary ===
==== Candidates ====
===== Nominee =====
- Angeline Cheek

==== Results ====
Democratic primary results
Party	Candidate	Votes	%
Democratic	Angeline Cheek	12,294	100.0
Total votes		12,294	100.0

=== General election ===
==== Results ====
2026 Montana Public Service Commission election, district 1
Party	Candidate	Votes	%
Republican	Jeff Pattison		
Democratic	Angeline Creek		
Total votes			100.00

== District 5 ==
=== Republican primary ===
==== Candidates ====
===== Nominee =====
- Ann Bukacek, incumbent commissioner

===== Eliminated in primary =====
- Joe Dooling, perennial candidate
- David Sanders, former executive director of the commission

==== Results ====
Republican primary results
Party	Candidate	Votes	%
Republican	Ann Bukacek (incumbent)	10,925	35.5
Republican	Joe Dooling	10,149	33.0
Republican	David Sanders	9,677	31.5
Total votes		30,751	100.0

=== Democratic primary ===
==== Candidates ====
===== Nominee =====
- Kevin Hamm, candidate for district 2 in 2024

==== Results ====
Democratic primary results
Party	Candidate	Votes	%
Democratic	Kevin Hamm	22,014	100.0
Total votes		22,014	100.0

=== General election ===
==== Results ====
2026 Montana Public Service Commission election, district 5
Party	Candidate	Votes	%
Republican	Ann Bukacek (incumbent)		
Democratic	Kevin Hamm		
Total votes			100.00
