= Rob Cook (politician) =

American politician

Member of the Montana House of Representatives from the 27th district
- Succeeded by: Llew Jones

Personal details
- Born: December 30, 1965 (age 60) Choteau, Montana
- Party: Republican
- Education: Montana State University
- Profession: Managing partner

Rob Cook (born December 30, 1965) is a Republican member of the Montana Legislature. He was elected to House District 27 which represents the Conrad area.
