= Cleve Loney =

American politician (1950–2020)

Member of the Montana House of Representatives from the 25th district
- In office January 3, 2011 – January 7, 2013
- Preceded by: Sue Dickenson
- Succeeded by: Tom Jacobson

Personal details
- Born: November 5, 1950 Great Falls, Montana
- Died: August 22, 2020 (aged 69) Great Falls, Montana
- Party: Republican
- Education: Montana State University
- Profession: Realtor

Cleve Loney (November 5, 1950 – August 22, 2020) was an American politician who served as a Republican member of the Montana House of Representatives from 2011 to 2013. He was elected to House District 25 which represents part of the Great Falls area.

== Biography ==
Cleve Loney was born in Great Falls on November 5, 1950, and raised on a ranch. He attended high school in Highwood, Montana. After graduating in 1969, he went to Sheridan Junior College on a rodeo scholarship. During this time, he won a Regional Championship in Saddle Bronc Riding. Lonny later transferred to Montana State University, where he was part of the National Championship Rodeo Team in 1972, graduating in 1976 with a B.S. Degree in Agricultural Production. In 1990, he was inducted into the MSU Athletics Hall of Fame.

Loney died on August 22, 2020, in Great Falls, Montana, at age 69. He drowned in the Missouri River after his kayak tipped over.
