= Llew Jones =

American politician

Member of the Montana House of Representatives from the 18th district
- Incumbent
- Assumed office January 7, 2019
- Preceded by: Rob Cook

Member of the Montana Senate from the 9th district
- In office January 5, 2015 – January 7, 2019
- Preceded by: Rick Ripley
- Succeeded by: Bruce Gillespie

Member of the Montana Senate from the 14th district
- In office January 3, 2011 – January 5, 2015
- Preceded by: Jerry Black
- Succeeded by: Kris Hansen

Member of the Montana House of Representatives from the 27th district
- In office January 3, 2005 – January 3, 2011
- Preceded by: Scott Sales
- Succeeded by: Rob Cook

Personal details
- Born: December 2, 1962 (age 63) Helena, Montana
- Party: Republican
- Spouse: Carole
- Education: Montana State University
- Occupation: Business owner

Llewelyn E. Jones (born December 2, 1962) is a Republican member of the Montana Legislature. He has served four terms in the Montana Senate and seven in the Montana House of Representatives.

Jones was first elected in 2004 to House District 27 which covers Pondera County and surrounding area. He narrowly defeated Democrat Norman Ballantyne with 52% of the vote. In 2006 and 2008 he ran unopposed.

In 2010 he was elected to Senate District 14, which included five counties: Chouteau, Glacier, Liberty, Pondera, and Toole. Redistricting caused roughly the same area to be represented by Senate District 9 in the 2014 election. Jones contested the seat against David Brownell winning with 5,647 votes to 1,801 votes.

Due to term limits in Montana, Jones was unable to seek Senate re-election in 2018. However he was eligible to run for the Montana House of Representatives. Redistricting caused him to seek the position in House District 18. He ran unopposed in 2018, 2020 and 2022. In 2024 he was challenged by David Arends. Jones won 73% of the vote. Jones was appointed Chair of the House Appropriations Committee in 2025. Due to term limits, Jones will not be able to seek re-election to the House in the 2026 elections.

Jones holds an MS in Economics from Montana State University.
