= Pat Flowers =

Pat Flowers may refer to:

- Pat Flowers (musician)
- Pat Flowers (politician)

== See also ==
- Pat Flower (Patricia Mary Byson Flower), English Australian writer
