= Joshua Kassmier =

American politician

Member of the Montana Senate from the 13th district
- Incumbent
- Assumed office January 6, 2025
- Preceded by: Jeremy Trebas

Member of the Montana House of Representatives from the 27th district
- In office January 7, 2019 – January 6, 2025
- Preceded by: Jim O'Hara
- Succeeded by: Paul Tuss

Personal details
- Born: 1981 (age 44–45) Fort Benton, Montana, U.S.
- Party: Republican
- Spouse: Chelsey Johnston
- Children: 3 CoraLynn, Joshua Banks, Regina
- Education: Carroll College (BA)
- Profession: Crop adjuster

Joshua J. Kassmier is an American politician and a Republican member of the Montana House of Representatives. Kassmier was a part of a moderate coalition of 9 Republicans formed with Democrats in the 69th Montana Legislature, dubbed the "nasty nine" by opponents and was censured on March 27 for his efforts.
