= Matt Regier =

American businessman and politician

President of the Montana Senate
- Incumbent
- Assumed office January 6, 2025
- Preceded by: Jason Ellsworth

Member of the Montana Senate from the 5th district
- Incumbent
- Assumed office January 6, 2025
- Preceded by: Mark Noland

56th Speaker of the Montana House of Representatives
- In office January 2, 2023 – January 6, 2025
- Preceded by: Wylie Galt
- Succeeded by: Brandon Ler

Member of the Montana House of Representatives from the 4th district
- In office January 2, 2017 – January 6, 2025
- Preceded by: Keith Regier
- Succeeded by: Lyn Bennet

Personal details
- Born: 1980 (age 45–46) Kalispell, Montana, U.S.
- Party: Republican
- Relatives: Keith Regier (father); Amy Regier (sister)
- Education: University of Montana (BS)

Matt Regier (born 1980) is an American businessman and politician who serves as the President of the Montana Senate. He is a member of the Republican party. Regier was Speaker of the Montana House of Representatives from 2023 to 2025. Prior to that he represented the 4th district in the Montana House of Representatives from 2017 to 2023.

== Early life and education ==
Regier was born in Kalispell, Montana. Regier's father is Keith Regier, a member of the Montana Legislature. Regier's mother is Jolene Regier. In 2005, Regier earned a Bachelor of Science degree in business from University of Montana.

== Career ==
As a businessman, Regier is the owner of Stillwater Sod Corporation. Regier is also a real estate investor.

On November 8, 2016, Regier won the election and became a Republican member of Montana House of Representatives for District 4. Regier defeated Deborah Gentry with 77.17% of the vote. On November 6, 2018, as an incumbent, Regier won the election and continued serving District 4. Regier defeated Kwen Shirley with 75.80% of the vote. In 2023 he was elected Speaker of the Montana House of Representatives. The 2023 Legislative Session was marked by the fact that Republicans occupied a supermajority in both houses.

On April 18, 2023, Democratic representative Zooey Zephyr, the only transgender member in the House, criticized supporters of Senate Bill 99, saying, "I hope the next time there’s an invocation when you bow your heads in prayer, you see the blood on your hands.” Senate Bill 99 prohibits gender-affirming medical care for trans minors. Regier, as House Speaker, refused to let her speak on any subsequent bills even though she had not been censured, saying that it was "up to [him] to maintain decorum here on the House floor" and "to protect the dignity and integrity". He said he would not allow her to speak until she apologized; she rejected the offer. On April 26, Zephyr was barred from the House floor for the remainder of the 2023 session. Four days later, Zephyr filed a lawsuit against Regier and the state of Montana with legal support from the Montana ACLU.

== Personal life ==
Regier and his family lived in Kalispell, Montana. Regier resides in Columbia Falls, Montana.

== See also ==
- Montana House of Representatives, District 4

Political offices
Preceded by Wylie Galt	Speaker of the Montana House of Representatives; 2023–2025	Succeeded by Brandon Ler
Preceded by Jason Ellsworth	President of the Montana Senate; 2025–present	Incumbent
