= Bob Keenan =

American politician (born 1952)

President pro tempore of the Montana Senate
- In office January 2, 2017 – January 7, 2019
- Preceded by: Eric Moore
- Succeeded by: Mark Blasdel

Member of the Montana Senate from the 5th district
- In office January 5, 2015 – January 2, 2023
- Preceded by: Verdell Jackson
- Succeeded by: Mark Noland

Member of the Montana Senate from the 5th district
- In office January 1999 – January 2007
- Succeeded by: Verdell Jackson

Member of the Montana House of Representatives from the 10th district
- Incumbent
- Assumed office January 2023

Member of the Montana House of Representatives from the 75th district
- In office January 1995 – January 1999

Personal details
- Born: March 11, 1952 (age 74) Salem, Massachusetts, U.S.
- Party: Republican
- Spouse: Suzie
- Children: 5
- Education: University of Massachusetts, Amherst (BA)

Bob Keenan (born March 11, 1952) is a Republican member of the Montana Legislature. He was elected on November 4, 2014, to Senate District 5, and assumed that office on January 5, 2015, serving in the 2015 legislative session. Keenan represents District 19, which encompasses parts of Flathead and Lake Counties, Montana. Keenan served as president pro tempore from 2017 to 2018, and as the Senate Minority Leader from 2005 to 2007. Keenan previously served in the Montana House of Representatives from 1995 to 1999 and in the Montana Senate from 1999 to 2007, where he was president of the senate.

Montana Senate
Preceded by Verdell Jackson	Member of the Montana Senate from the 5th district 2015–present	Incumbent
Preceded by Eric Moore	President pro tempore of the Montana Senate; 2017–2019	Succeeded by Mark Blasdel
