= Edward Buttrey =

American politician

Member of the Montana House of Representatives from the 21st district
- Incumbent
- Assumed office January 4, 2019
- Preceded by: Tom Jacobson

Member of the Montana Senate from the 11th district
- In office January 5, 2015 – January 4, 2019
- Preceded by: Anders Blewett
- Succeeded by: Tom Jacobson

Member of the Montana Senate from the 13th district
- In office January 3, 2011 – January 5, 2015
- Preceded by: Joseph Tropila
- Succeeded by: Brian Hoven

Personal details
- Born: Francis Edward Buttrey; December 14, 1965 (age 60) Helena, Montana, U.S.
- Party: Republican
- Education: Montana State University

Francis "Ed" Edward Buttrey (born December 14, 1965) is a Republican member of the Montana Legislature. He served in the Montana Senate from 2011 to 2019 and then served in the Montana House of Representatives. Since 2019 he has served as a Representative for House District 21 which covers northwest Great Falls and Black Eagle. Due to Montana term limits he will be unable to seek re-election for this seat in 2026.

== Legislative history ==
Buttrey served as Majority Whip in the Senate during the 2015-2016 session.

Buttrey has garnered a mixed reputation in regards to policy during his tenure in both Montana legislative bodies. Though Buttrey was lauded by centrist Republicans and Democrats alike for working on Medicaid expansion in Montana, he was criticized by the Center for Budget and Policy Priorities for his legislation which the Center said "would likely cause coverage losses similar to or even higher than those of Arkansas, the first state with a Medicaid work requirement. That state ended coverage for more than 18,000 people.”

In 2013, Buttrey voted for SB 405 which repealed same-day voter registration. Then-AARP President Jeannine English described the bill and other measures like it as "...a form of voter suppression."

In 2019, Buttrey voted against Montana HB 547 which prohibits employers from stopping employees from discussing wages.

== Campaign for U.S House ==
On December 18, 2016, Buttrey announced his candidacy for the special election to fill Montana's at-large U.S. House seat vacated by United States Secretary of the Interior appointee Ryan Zinke.

At the Republican party convention on March 3, 2017, Buttrey and multiple other GOP candidates were eliminated in favor of businessman Greg Gianforte who would go on to win the general election as well.

== Election history ==
Buttrey first ran for the Montana legislature in 2010. For Senate District 13 he defeated former state Rep. Kathleen Galvin-Halcro with 58% of the vote. A complaint was lodged against Buttrey for illegally coordinating with a dark money group during the campaign. The charges against Buttrey were dismissed, though nine others were found culpable. During the legislative session Buttrey was appointed Chair of both the Local Government and Legislative Administration committees.

Due to redistricting following the US census Buttrey ran for Senate District 13 in the 2014 elections. The new district still covered Cascade County. His opponent was Democrat Vonnie Brown. Buttrey received 3,494 votes compared to 2,988 for Brown. He was appointed Chair of the Business, Labor, and Economic Affairs committee. Because of Montana term limits, he was unable to seek re-election.

In 2018 he ran for Montana House District 21. He won a three-way primary with 75% of the vote. In the general election he defeated Democrat Leesha Ford with 54% of the vote. For the 2020 election he won against Sally Tucker in the primary. He then defeated opponent Jaime Horn with 66% of the vote to retain his House seat. During the campaign Horn submitted a picture to MTN News showing Buttrey in a room with a swastika. It was quickly shown to be a captured flag hanging at the VFW.

Buttrey ran for re-election in 2022. He faced no challengers in the primaries. He contested the general election against Lela Graham, Executive Director of Independence Rock Coalition and Army Veteran. Buttrey received 65% of the vote securing his seat for another term. For the 2023 session he was appointed Chair of the Business and Labor committee. In 2024 Graham ran again. Buttrey won with 67% of the vote. He was again assigned as Chair to the Business and Labor committee.

== Personal life ==
Buttrey received a degree in electrical engineering from Montana State University. He owns several business in Great Falls. He is a volunteer firefighter and volunteer football coach.
