= Tom Jacobson =

American politician

Member of the Montana Senate from the 11th district
- In office January 7, 2019 – January 2, 2023
- Preceded by: Edward Buttrey
- Succeeded by: Daniel Emrich

Member of the Montana House of Representatives from the 21st district
- In office January 5, 2015 – January 7, 2019
- Preceded by: Jean Price
- Succeeded by: Edward Buttrey

Member of the Montana House of Representatives from the 25th district
- In office January 7, 2013 – January 5, 2015
- Preceded by: Cleve Loney
- Succeeded by: Casey Schreiner

Personal details
- Born: February 1, 1967 (age 59)
- Party: Democratic
- Spouse: none
- Children: Two
- Education: University of Providence (BA); University of Wyoming (MPA)

Tom Jacobson (born February 1, 1967) is an American politician. A Democrat, he represents District 11 in the Montana State Senate.

== Political career ==
In 2012, Jacobson ran for election to represent District 25 in the Montana House of Representatives, and defeated Republican incumbent Cleve Loney with 50.7% of the vote. After redistricting, Jacobson ran for, and won, election to represent District 21 in 2014. In 2016, he ran for re-election to the District 21 seat and was unopposed in both the Democratic primary and the general election.

In 2018, the incumbent State Senator for the 11th district, Republican Edward Buttrey, was unable to run for re-election due to term limits. Jacobson ran for the open seat, and faced Adam Rosendale, a former state representative from District 51, in the general election. Jacobson won with 57.5% of the vote.

As of June 2020, Jacobson sits on the following committees:

- Natural Resources
- Fish and Game
- Health and Human Services
- Finance and Claims

=== Electoral record ===
2012 general election: Montana House of Representatives, District 25
Party	Candidate	Votes	%
Democratic	Tom Jacobson	2,571	50.7%
Republican	Cleve Loney	2,497	49.3%

2014 general election: Montana House of Representatives, District 21
Party	Candidate	Votes	%
Democratic	Tom Jacobson	1,898	53.9%
Republican	Cleve Loney	1,625	46.1%

In 2016, Jacobson won the District 21 Montana House seat unopposed.

2018 general election: Montana State Senate, District 11
Party	Candidate	Votes	%
Democratic	Tom Jacobson	4,706	57.5%
Republican	Adam Rosendale	3,478	42.5%

== Personal life ==
Jacobson holds a Bachelor of Arts degree in Business Administration and Management from the University of Providence, and a Master of Public Administration degree from the University of Wyoming. He is single, has two children, and lives in Great Falls, Montana.
