= Erin Farris-Olsen =

American politician

Member of the Montana Senate from the 41st district
- Preceded by: Janet Ellis

Personal details
- Party: Democratic Party

Erin Farris-Olsen is a member of the Montana Senate for the 41st district. She is a member of the Brothertown Indian Nation.

== See also ==
- List of Native American politicians
- Native American women in politics
