= Gordon Vance =

American politician (1951–2024)

Member of the Montana Senate from the 34th district
- In office January 5, 2015 – January 2, 2023
- Preceded by: Scott Sales
- Succeeded by: Shelley Vance

Member of the Montana House of Representatives from the 67th district
- In office January 5, 2009 – January 5, 2015
- Preceded by: John Sinrud
- Succeeded by: Tom Burnett

Personal details
- Born: December 17, 1951 Great Falls, Montana, U.S.
- Died: March 15, 2024 (aged 72) Bozeman, Montana, U.S.
- Party: Republican

Gordon Vance (December 17, 1951 – March 15, 2024) was an American politician who was a Republican member of the Montana Legislature. He was elected to House District 67 in 2008 which represents a portion of the Gallatin County area. He was re-elected twice, serving in the 2009, 2011, and 2013 legislative sessions. He later represented the same area as a State Senator for District 34. He served in the Senate during the 2015, 2017, 2019, and 2021 sessions. He left office on January 2, 2023.

Vance died on March 15, 2024, at the age of 72.
