= Edward Walker (politician) =

American politician (born 1970)

Ed Walker

Member of the Montana Senate from the 29th district
- In office January 3, 2011 – January 5, 2015

Personal details
- Born: December 30, 1970 (age 55) Butte, Montana
- Party: Republican
- Spouse: Kathleen
- Education: Montana State University (BS) University of Denver (MPP)

Ed Walker (born 1970) is a Republican member of the Montana Legislature. He was elected for Senate District 29, representing Billings, Montana, in 2010. Walker received a Bachelor's in Economics from Montana State University and a Master's in Public Policy from the University of Denver.

In October 2023, Walker announced that he would run for the U.S. House of Representatives in Montana's 2nd congressional district. He withdrew from the race in April 2024, but remained on the ballot in the Republican primary election.
