= John Sinrud =

American politician (born 1967)

Member of the Montana House of Representatives
- In office 2002–2008

Personal details
- Born: John M. Sinrud; August 30, 1967 (age 58) Edmonds, Washington, U.S.
- Party: Republican
- Spouse: Kim
- Children: 2
- Education: Montana State University (BS)
- Profession: Politician

John Sinrud (born August 30, 1967) is an American politician and a former Republican member of the Montana House of Representatives. Sinrud was the Chair of the House Committee on Appropriations. He resides in Belgrade, Montana. Sinrud graduated with a bachelor's degree in political science from Montana State University in 1998. During his final year in college, he was the president of the College Republicans.
