= Pat Connell =

American politician

Pat Connell is a former American politician. He served as a Republican member of the Montana Senate from 2011 to 2018, where he represented District 43, including Hamilton, Montana. In the state senate, he sought unsuccessfully to make it easier for firefighters to claim worker's compensation. After completing his legislative service, he returned to representing the timber industry.
