= Sue Dickenson =

American politician

Member of the Montana House of Representatives from the 25th district
- In office 2002 - 2010

Personal details
- Born: August 24, 1945 (age 80) Billings, Montana
- Party: Democratic Party
- Spouse: Bob
- Education: University of Montana
- Profession: Educator

Sue M. Dickenson is a Democratic Party member of the Montana House of Representatives, representing District 25 since 2002.
