= Forrest Mandeville =

American politician from Montana

Member of the Montana House of Representatives from the 57th district
- In office January 5, 2015 – January 4, 2021
- Preceded by: Sarah Laszloffy
- Succeeded by: Fiona Nave

Member of the Montana Senate from the 28th district
- Incumbent
- Assumed office January 6, 2025
- Preceded by: David Howard (29th district)

Personal details
- Born: April 29, 1984 (age 42) Columbus, Montana, U.S.
- Party: Republican

Forrest Mandeville (born April 29, 1984) is an American politician in the Montana Senate. He previously served in the Montana House of Representatives for the 57th district from 2015 to 2021.
