= Nels Swandal =

American politician

Nels Swandal is an American politician. He is a former Republican member of the Montana Senate, where he represented District 30, including Wilsall, Montana.
