= Jedediah Hinkle =

American politician

Member of the Montana House of Representatives from the 67th district
- Incumbent
- Assumed office January 4, 2021
- Preceded by: Tom Burnett

Member of the Montana Senate from the 32nd district
- In office January 5, 2015 – January 7, 2019
- Preceded by: Larry Jent
- Succeeded by: Pat Flowers

Personal details
- Born: 1980 (age 45–46) Sitka, Alaska
- Party: Republican
- Relatives: Caleb Hinkle (brother)
- Education: Montana State University (BS)
- Occupation: Taxidermist

Jedediah Hinkle is an American politician and taxidermist. A Republican, he is a member of the Montana House of Representatives. He previously served in the Montana Senate from 2015 to 2019.

In 2021, he supported moving same-day voter registration back one day, to relieve pressure on elections offices while they counted ballots.

== Personal life ==
Hinkle is the brother of Montana State Representative Caleb Hinkle.
