= Brian Hoven =

American politician

Member of the Montana Senate from the 13th district
- In office January 5, 2015 – January 2, 2023
- Preceded by: Edward Buttrey
- Succeeded by: Jeremy Trebas

Member of the Montana House of Representatives from the 24th district
- In office January 5, 2009 – January 5, 2015
- Succeeded by: Jean Price

Personal details
- Born: November 28, 1941 (age 84) Great Falls, Montana
- Party: Republican
- Spouse: Barbara
- Education: Princeton University, (BS)
- Profession: Business owner

Military service
- Allegiance: United States
- Branch/service: United States Army

Brian Hoven (born November 28, 1941) is a Republican member of the Montana Senate. He was elected to House District 24 which represents the Great Falls area.

Hoven earned a Bachelor of Science degree from Princeton University. He is a United States Army Reserve veteran. Hoven owns his own business and resides in Great Falls, Montana.
