= Duane Ankney =

American politician (1946–2025)

Member of the Montana Senate from the 20th district
- In office January 5, 2015 – January 2, 2023
- Preceded by: Eric Moore

Member of the Montana House of Representatives from the 43rd district
- In office January 3, 2007 – January 5, 2015
- Preceded by: Monica Lindeen
- Succeeded by: Clayton Fiscus

Personal details
- Born: April 14, 1946 Lewiston, Idaho, U.S.
- Died: September 6, 2025 (aged 79)
- Party: Republican
- Spouse: Carol Schillinger Ankney
- Children: 5

Military service
- Allegiance: United States
- Branch: United States Navy
- Service years: 1964–1969

Duane Ankney (April 14, 1946 – September 6, 2025) was an American politician in the state of Montana. He was a Republican member of the Montana Senate representing District 20 from 2015 until his death, and a member of Montana House of Representatives for District 43, which includes a portion of the Yellowstone County area, from 2007 to 2015.

Ankney died on September 6, 2025, at the age of 79.

== Political positions ==
=== Energy ===
Ankney was a supporter of coal usage. In 2015, Ankney introduced Senate Bill 402, which would have required utilities to pay an impact fee to close a power plant before 2025. Portions of the revenue made from the fee would have gone to school districts and the Montana Department of Commerce. The bill failed on a 49–49 vote in the Montana House of Representatives. While debating with senators from Washington state on whether to shut down the Colstrip Power Plant, Ankney argued that the electricity helped build the state in the 1970s.
