= Daniel Zolnikov =

American politician (born 1987)

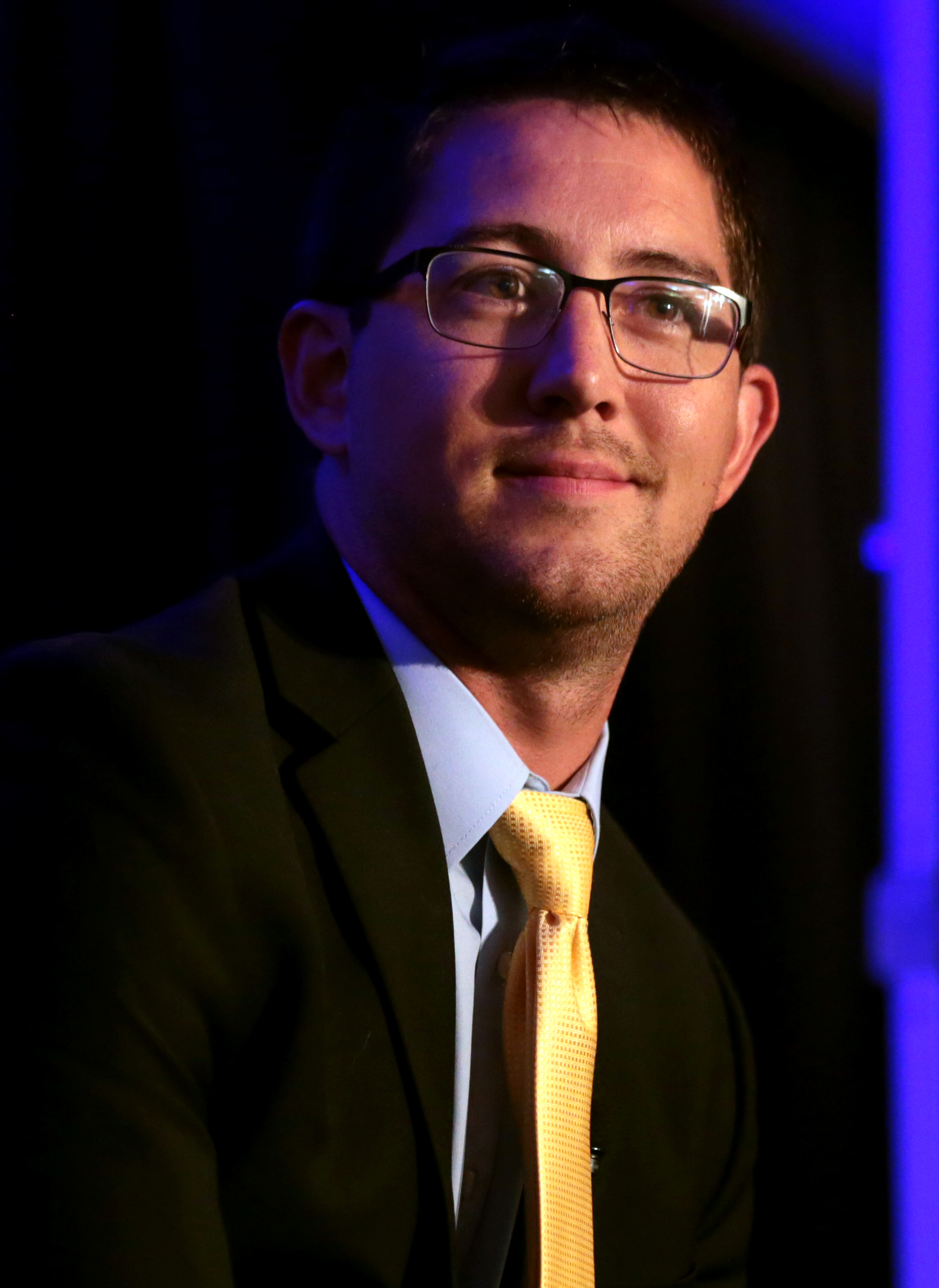

Member of the Montana Senate from the 22nd district
- Incumbent
- Assumed office January 2, 2023
- Succeeded by: Douglas Kary

Member of the Montana House of Representatives from the 45th district
- In office January 7, 2013 – September 2020
- Preceded by: Tom Berry
- Succeeded by: Katie Zolnikov

Personal details
- Born: January 29, 1987 (age 39) Roundup, Montana, U.S.
- Party: Republican
- Spouse: Katie Zolnikov
- Education: University of Montana
- Website: https://danielzolnikov.com/serving-you

Daniel Zolnikov (born January 29, 1987) is an American politician who is currently serving in the Montana Senate representing Senate District (SD) 22. He previously served as a member of the Montana House of Representatives from 2013 to 2020. Zolnikov is noted for pursuing pro-privacy legislation. Zolnikov is a Republican.

== Career ==
In 2013, Zolnikov was elected to the Montana House from House District 47, which represents Billings, Montana. He was chairman of the House Federal Relations, Energy and Telecommunications Committee.

In June 2020, he was defeated in a race for a seat on the Montana Public Service Commission.

In September 2020, he resigned from the House to accept a position with an energy company. Subsequently, the Yellowstone County Commission appointed his wife Katie Zolnikov to replace him. Zolnikov successfully ran for District 22 in the 2022 Montana Senate election.
