= Frederick Moore (politician) =

American politician

Frederick "Eric" Moore

Member of the Montana House of Representatives from the 37th district
- In office January 7, 2019 – January 4, 2021
- Preceded by: Bill Harris
- Succeeded by: Jerry Schillinger

Member of the Montana Senate from the 20th into 19th district
- In office January 3, 2011 – January 7, 2019
- Preceded by: Keith Bales
- Succeeded by: Kenneth Bogner

Personal details
- Born: Colorado, U.S.
- Party: Republican
- Spouse: Lea Moore
- Education: Montana State University (BS)

Frederick "Eric" Moore is an American politician who served as a member of the Montana Legislature. He was first elected on November 2, 2010 to Senate District 20.

== Early life and education ==
Moore, originally from Colorado, Moore earned a Bachelor of Science degree in agriculture science from Montana State University.

== Career ==
In the 2011 session, Moore was appointed to the Business & Labor, Education, and Agriculture committees. In 2013, he served as a majority whip. Moore served District 20 until being redistricted in 2015, and now represents District 37, which includes all of Carter, Garfield, McCone, and Prairie Counties, and parts of Fallon, Powder River and Wibaux Counties, Montana. Moore has also served as president pro tempore of the Senate.

== Personal life ==
He lives in Custer County, Montana with his wife Lea and their two children.

== Montana State Legislature ==
=== 2010 Montana Senate election ===
Montana's 20th District Senate Primary Election, 2010
Party	Candidate	Votes	%
Republican	Frederick "Eric" Moore	2,284	56.59
Republican	John J. Laney	755	18.71
Republican	Carol Lambert	642	15.91
Republican	Ray Roerick	355	8.79
Total votes		4,036	100

Moore was uncontested in the general election, having received 5,828 votes.

=== 2014 Montana Senate election ===
Moore was uncontested in the primary election, having received 3,159 votes.

Montana's 19th District Senate General Election, 2014
Party	Candidate	Votes	%
Republican	Frederick "Eric" Moore	5,222	68.17
Democratic	Bill McChesney	2,438	31.83
Total votes		7,660	100

=== 2018 Montana House of Representatives election ===
Moore was uncontested in the primary election, having received 2,693 votes.

Moore was also uncontested in the general election, having received 4,746 votes.

=== 2020 Montana House of Representatives election ===
Montana's 37th District House of Representatives Primary Election, 2020
Party	Candidate	Votes	%
Republican	Jerry Schillinger	2,658	64.08
Republican	Frederick "Eric" Moore	1,490	35.92
Total votes		4,148	100

Montana Senate
Preceded by Matthew Rosendale	Member of the Montana Senate from the 19th district 2015-2019	Succeeded by Kenneth Bogner
Montana Senate
Preceded by Keith Bales	Member of the Montana Senate from the 20th district 2011-2015	Succeeded by Duane Ankney
