= Jill Cohenour =

American politician

Member of the Montana House of Representatives
- Incumbent
- Assumed office January 2, 2023
- Preceded by: Mary Ann Dunwell
- Constituency: 84th district (2023–2025); 83rd district (2025–present)
- In office January 6, 2003 – January 3, 2011
- Preceded by: Gilda Clancy
- Succeeded by: Steve Gibson
- Constituency: 51st district (2003–2005); 78th district (2005–2011)

Minority Leader of the Montana Senate
- In office January 4, 2021 – January 2, 2023
- Preceded by: Jon Sesso
- Succeeded by: Pat Flowers

Member of the Montana Senate from the 42nd district
- In office January 5, 2015 – January 2, 2023
- Preceded by: Dave Lewis
- Succeeded by: Mary Ann Dunwell

Personal details
- Born: Havre, Montana, U.S.
- Party: Democratic
- Spouse: Joe
- Education: University of Montana (BS)

Jill Cohenour is a Democratic Party member of the Montana House of Representatives. Representing the East Helena area, she has represented the 51st district from 2003 to 2005, the 78th from 2005 to 2011, the 84th from 2023 to 2025, and the 83rd since 2025. She also represented the 42nd district in the Montana Senate from 2015 to 2023, rising to minority leader from 2021 to 2023.

Montana Senate
Preceded by Jon Sesso	Minority Leader of the Montana Senate; 2021–2023	Succeeded by Pat Flowers
