= John Esp =

American politician

Member of the Montana Senate
- Incumbent
- Assumed office January 7, 2019
- Constituency: 30th
- In office January 6, 2003 – January 3, 2010
- Constituency: 31st

Member of the Montana House of Representatives
- In office January 3, 2001 – January 6, 2003
- Constituency: 25th
- In office January 3, 2011 – January 7, 2013
- Constituency: 61st

Personal details
- Born: 1952 (age 73–74) Bozeman, Montana
- Party: Republican
- Spouse: Stoney Esp
- Children: 2
- Education: Montana State University
- Profession: Carpenter

John Esp is a Republican member of the Montana Legislature. He was elected to the Montana Senate in 2018 to represent Senate District 30, which includes the Big Timber area. Esp previously served in the Montana House of Representatives from 2001–2003 and again from 2011–2013. Before serving his current term in the Montana Senate he served in the senate from 2003–2010.
