= Denise Hayman =

American politician (born 1951)

Member of the Montana Senate
- Incumbent
- Assumed office January 2, 2023
- Preceded by: Jennifer Pomnichowski
- Constituency: 33rd district (2023–2025); 32nd district (2025–present)

Member of the Montana House of Representatives from the 66th district
- In office January 5, 2015 – January 2, 2023
- Preceded by: Jennifer Pomnichowski
- Succeeded by: Eric Matthews

Personal details
- Born: 1951 (age 74–75) Winnipeg, Canada
- Party: Democratic

Denise Hayman (born January 1, 1951) is an American politician who is currently serving in the Montana Senate as the senator from the 33rd District in Bozeman. She previously served as a member of the Montana House of Representatives for the 66th district from 2015 to 2023.

Prior to her legislative tenure, she spent fifteen years as a member of the Bozeman School Board.
