= Daniel Emrich =

American politician

Member of the Montana Senate from the 11th district
- Incumbent
- Assumed office January 2, 2023
- Preceded by: Tom Jacobson

Personal details
- Party: Republican
- Spouse: Ashley

Daniel Emrich is an American politician from Montana. He has served as a Republican member of the Montana Senate since 2023.

In February 2023, Emrich introduced House Bill 235, which would have prohibited science educators from teaching "subject matter that is not scientific fact." It designated facts as "observable and repeatable," defining all scientific theories as "speculation." It received heavy opposition from students, educators, and representatives of the Board of Public Education, who argued that this mischaracterization of scientific theory would inhibit the instruction of climate change, gravity, and cell theory.
