= David Howard (Montana politician) =

American politician

Member of the Montana Senate from the 29th district
- Incumbent
- Assumed office January 5, 2015
- Preceded by: Edward Walker

Member of the Montana House of Representatives from the 60th district
- In office January 5, 2009 – January 5, 2015
- Preceded by: Jack Ross
- Succeeded by: Debra Lamm

Personal details
- Born: October 19, 1946 (age 79)
- Party: Republican

David Howard (born October 19, 1946) is an American politician and a Republican member of the Montana Senate, representing District 29 since 2015. Previously, he served in the Montana House of Representatives and represented District 60, which represents the Stillwater County and part of the Sweet Grass County area, from 2009 to 2015.
