= Mary McNally =

American politician

Member of the Montana Senate from the 24th district
- In office January 5, 2015 – January 2, 2023
- Preceded by: Kendall Van Dyk
- Succeeded by: Katharin Kelker

Member of the Montana House of Representatives from the 49th district
- In office January 3, 2011 – January 5, 2015
- Preceded by: Kendall Van Dyk
- Succeeded by: Katharin Kelker

Personal details
- Born: Mary R. McNally; March 1955 (age 71) Springfield, Massachusetts, United States
- Party: Democratic
- Spouse: Monte Smith
- Education: Worcester State University; Indiana University School of Business; University of Chicago
- Website: www.mary-mcnally.com

Mary R. McNally (born March 1955) is an American educator and politician, who served as a Democratic member of the Montana Senate from the 24th District after previously representing the 47th District of the Montana House of Representatives.

== Early life and education ==
McNally received a Bachelor of Arts in Urban Studies from Worcester State College in 1978, and then went on to Indiana University School of Business to complete a Master of Business Administration in 1980. She returned to school to the University of Chicago, where she completed a Doctor of Philosophy in Economic Geography in 1991. McNally's dissertation was titled: "Developing American Indian Water Rights in Montana: Law and Local Context."

== Education career ==
In September 1987, while enrolled at the University of Chicago, McNally began her teaching career as a fixed-term instructor at Eastern Montana College in Billings. Four years later, she was hired as an assistant professor. McNally received promotions to associate professor (1994) and full professor (2000). Administrative roles included being named chair of the Management and Economics Department (1996–1998) and interim dean of the College of Business (2005-2006). In 2017, McNally retired from teaching and was given the title of professor emeritus of management.

Prior to McNally's tenure at Eastern Montana, she served as dean at Sinte Gleska College in Mission, South Dakota. During that time, the school began the first of the tribal colleges and universities to receive a four-year accreditation.

== Political career ==
McNally began her political career in 2010, while still a faculty member at Eastern Montana. She was elected to the Montana House of Representatives, representing the 49th District, which included part of Billings. McNally succeeded Kendall Van Dyk, and was reelected in 2012 for a second term.

In 2014, McNally once again sought reelection to the House. During the midst of the election, Van Dyk announced his campaign suspension because he was expecting a child. Though Van Dyk appeared on the primary ballot, he endorsed McNally to replace him as the Democratic nominee for the 24th District. Subsequently, McNally was appointed by the Yellowstone County Democratic Central Committee as the Montana Democratic Party nominee for the Senate. Additionally, the committee appointed Katharin Kelker to replace McNally for the House. Both won their races, and McNally was reelected in 2018.

== Personal life ==
McNally is married to Monte Smith, a geologist. The couple reside in Billings.
