= Douglas Kary =

American politician

Member of the Montana Senate from the 22nd district
- Incumbent
- Assumed office January 5, 2015
- Preceded by: Taylor Brown

Member of the Montana House of Representatives from the 48th district
- In office January 3, 2011 – January 5, 2015
- Succeeded by: Jessica Karjala

Personal details
- Born: December 29, 1951 (age 74) Dickinson, North Dakota
- Party: Republican
- Spouse: Paulette
- Education: Minot State University, (AA)

Douglas Kary (born December 29, 1951) is a Republican member of the Montana Senate. He is whip for the Republican Senate. He was elected to the Montana Senate in 2015. From 2011 to 2015, Kary served in the Montana House of Representatives.
