= Mark Blasdel =

American politician from Montana

President of the Montana Senate
- In office January 4, 2021 – January 2, 2023
- Preceded by: Scott Sales
- Succeeded by: Jason Ellsworth

President pro tempore of the Montana Senate
- In office January 7, 2019 – January 4, 2021
- Preceded by: Bob Keenan
- Succeeded by: Jason Ellsworth

Member of the Montana Senate from the 4th district
- In office January 5, 2015 – January 2, 2023
- Preceded by: Jon Sonju
- Succeeded by: John Fuller (Redistricted)

52nd Speaker of the Montana House of Representatives
- In office January 7, 2013 – January 5, 2015
- Preceded by: Mike Milburn
- Succeeded by: Austin Knudsen

Member of the Montana House of Representatives from the 10th district
- In office January 3, 2007 – January 5, 2015
- Preceded by: Bernie Olson
- Succeeded by: Mark Noland

Personal details
- Born: June 21, 1976 (age 50) Kalispell, Montana, U.S.
- Party: Republican
- Spouse: Renae
- Education: Flathead Valley Community College; University of Nevada, Reno (BA)

Mark Blasdel (born June 21, 1976) is an American politician who was a Republican member of the Montana Legislature from 2007 to 2023. For eight years he served in the Montana House of Representatives, where he served as the speaker of the House from 2013 to 2015. Following his term in the Montana House, Blasdel was elected to the Montana Senate for eight years. He served as president pro tempore of the Montana Senate from 2019 to 2021 and president of the Montana Senate from 2021 to 2023.

During his legislative career, he represented the Somers area.

== Early life ==
He graduated from Flathead High School, attended Flathead Valley Community College, and received a Bachelor of Arts degree in hospitality and business administration from the University of Nevada, Reno.

Political offices
Preceded by Mike Milburn	Speaker of the Montana House of Representatives; 2013–2015	Succeeded by Austin Knudsen
Preceded by Scott Sales	President of the Montana Senate; 2021–2023	Succeeded by Jason Ellsworth
Montana Senate
Preceded by Bob Keenan	President pro tempore of the Montana Senate; 2019–2021	Succeeded by Jason Ellsworth
