= Mark Noland =

American politician

Member of the Montana Senate from the 5th district
- Incumbent
- Assumed office January 2, 2023
- Preceded by: Bob Keenan

Member of the Montana House of Representatives from the 10th district
- In office January 5, 2015 – January 2, 2023
- Preceded by: Mark Blasdel
- Succeeded by: Bob Keenan

Personal details
- Born: 1959 (age 66–67) Whitefish, Montana
- Party: Republican
- Spouse: Kathy
- Children: 6
- Education: University of Montana
- Occupation: Business owner

Mark R. Noland is an American politician and a Republican member of the Montana House of Representatives, where he represents District 10, including Bigfork, Montana.

== Political career ==
Noland was first elected to represent District 10 in the Montana House of Representatives in 2014, and is running for his third re-election in 2020.

Noland sits on the following committees:

- Business and Labor (chair)
- Natural Resources
- Legislative Administration

=== Electoral record ===
2014 general election: Montana House of Representatives, District 10
Party	Candidate	Votes	%
Republican	Mark Noland	2,966	72%
Democratic	James Swanson	1,153	28%

2016 general election: Montana House of Representatives, District 10
Party	Candidate	Votes	%
Republican	Mark Noland	4,102	73.02%
Independent	Ruby Dynneson	1,516	26.98%

2018 general election: Montana House of Representatives, District 10
Party	Candidate	Votes	%
Republican	Mark Noland	4,324	79.7%
Libertarian	Bill Jones	1,100	20.3%

2020 Republican primary: Montana House of Representatives, District 10
Party	Candidate	Votes	%
Republican	Mark Noland	1,811	55.9%
Republican	Doug Mahlum	1,431	44.1%

2020 general election: Montana House of Representatives, District 10
Party	Candidate	Votes	%
Republican	Mark Noland	5,371	71.15%
Democratic	Jennifer Allen	2,178	28.85%

== See also ==
- Montana House of Representatives, District 10
