= Jean Price =

American politician (1943–2019)

Member of the Montana House of Representatives
- In office 2011–2019
- Constituency: 24th district (2015–2019); 21st district (2011–2015)

Personal details
- Born: Jean Louise Langenheder; September 13, 1943 Grand Island, Nebraska, U.S.
- Died: March 25, 2019 (aged 75) Great Falls, Montana, U.S.
- Party: Democratic
- Education: Hastings College, Kansas State University, Southern Illinois University Carbondale
- Occupation: art teacher, artist

Jean Louise Langenheder Price (September 13, 1943 – March 25, 2019) was a Democratic Party member of the Montana House of Representatives, representing District 20 from 2011 to 2019.

Price was an artist and retired art teacher. Price received her bachelor's degree in art and education from Hastings College. She also received her master's degrees, in sculpture and fibers, from Kansas State University and Southern Illinois University Carbondale. Price was also the director of the Urban Art Project of 2008, Great Falls, Montana.

She died of cancer in Great Falls Montana on March 25, 2019.

Her works include:

- Three Thousand and Counting – A tribute to U.S. Troops killed in Iraq. Medium – metal foil.
