= Kenneth Bogner =

American politician (born 1987)

President pro tempore of the Montana Senate
- Incumbent
- Assumed office January 2, 2023
- Preceded by: Jason Ellsworth

Member of the Montana Senate from the 18th district
- Incumbent
- Assumed office January 6, 2025

Member of the Montana Senate from the 19th district
- In office January 7, 2019 – January 6, 2025
- Preceded by: Eric Moore

Personal details
- Born: 1987 (age 38–39) Miles City, Montana, U.S.
- Party: Republican
- Education: Columbia University (BA); Middlesex University (MPP)

Military service
- Allegiance: United States
- Branch/service: United States Marine Corps
- Battles/wars: Iraq War

Kenneth Bogner is an American politician from the state of Montana. He is a Republican member and President Pro Tempore of the Montana Senate, representing the 18th district.

== Early life and career ==
Bogner served in the United States Marine Corps as a combat engineer. He completed two tours of duty in the Middle East during the Iraq War. After he completed his military service, Bogner utilized the G.I. Bill to earn his bachelor's degree in political science from Columbia University. He also earned a Master of Public Policy from Middlesex University. He returned to Montana and served as chief of staff for the majority leader of the Montana Senate and then as a field representative for Steve Daines.

== Montana State Legislature ==
Bogner was elected to the Montana Senate in 2018 and has served as President Pro Tempore since 2023. Albert Olszewski selected Bogner as his running mate in the 2020 Montana gubernatorial election.

During the 2021 legislative session, Bogner sponsored legislation to submit a constitutional amendment to explicitly include electronic data and communications in search and seizure protections. A majority of Montana voters approved the constitutional amendment in 2022.

In 2023, Montana Governor Greg Gianforte signed a bill sponsored by Bogner and passed by the state legislature, which prohibits U.S. foreign adversaries from purchasing critical infrastructure or agricultural land in Montana.

=== 2018 Montana Senate election ===
Montana's 19th District Senate Primary Election, 2018
Party	Candidate	Votes	%
Republican	Kenneth Bogner	1,970	42.92
Republican	Jerry Schillinger	1,829	39.85
Republican	Bill Harris	791	17.23
Total votes		4,590	100

Montana's 19th District Senate General Election, 2018
Party	Candidate	Votes	%
Republican	Kenneth Bogner	7,334	80.85
Democratic	Mary Zeiss Stange	1,737	19.15
Total votes		9,071	100

Montana Senate
Preceded by Jason Ellsworth	President pro tempore of the Montana Senate; 2023–present	Incumbent
