= Bruce Gillespie (politician) =

American politician (born 1946)

Member of the Montana Senate from the 9th district
- Incumbent
- Assumed office January 7, 2019
- Preceded by: Llew Jones

Personal details
- Born: 1946 (age 79–80) Kevin, Montana
- Party: Republican
- Spouse: Doreen
- Children: Kisten and Kent
- Education: Montana State University, (BA)
- Occupation: Rancher

Bruce "Butch" Gillespie (born 1946) is an American politician. He is a Republican representing the 9th district in the Montana State Senate. Gillespie was a part of a moderate coalition of 9 Republicans formed with Democrats in the 69th Montana Legislature, dubbed the "nasty nine" by opponents and was censured on March 27 for his efforts.

== Political career ==
In 2018, former 9th district Montana State Senator, Llew Jones, was unable to run for re-election due to term limits. Gillespie ran for the open seat, won the Republican primary with 68.7% of the vote, and went on to win the general election with 73.2% of the vote.

As of June 2020, Gillespie sits on the following committees:

- Natural Resources
- Taxation
- Agriculture, Livestock, and Irrigation

=== Electoral record ===
2018 Republican primary: Montana State Senate, District 9
| Party | Candidate | Votes | % |
|---|---|---|---|
| Republican | Bruce Gillespie | 2,550 | 68.7% |
| Republican | Charlie Brown | 1,161 | 31.3% |

2018 general election: Montana State Senate, District 9
| Party | Candidate | Votes | % |
|---|---|---|---|
| Republican | Bruce Gillespie | 6,347 | 73.2% |
| Democratic | Kurt Dyer | 2,318 | 26.8% |

== Personal life ==
Gillespie was born in Kevin, Montana in 1946. He went to high school in Sunburst, Montana, and holds a Bachelor of Arts in Agriculture Business and Range Management from Montana State University. Gillespie served two years in the Peace Corps in Ecuador.
