= Susan Webber (politician) =

American politician

Susan Webber is an American politician. She currently serves as a Democratic member of the Montana Senate for District 8. Previously, she was a member of the Montana House of Representatives for District 16. She is a member of the Blackfeet Nation.

== See also ==
- List of Native American politicians
- Native American women in politics
