= Jeremy Trebas =

American politician

Member of the Montana Senate
- Incumbent
- Assumed office January 6, 2025
- Preceded by: Steve Fitzpatrick
- Constituency: 10th district
- In office January 2, 2023 – January 6, 2025
- Preceded by: Brian Hoven
- Succeeded by: Joshua Kassmier
- Constituency: 13th district

Member of the Montana House of Representatives
- In office January 4, 2021 – January 2, 2023
- Preceded by: Casey Schreiner
- Succeeded by: Russ Miner
- Constituency: 26th district
- In office January 2, 2017 – January 7, 2019
- Preceded by: Casey Schreiner
- Succeeded by: Jasmine Krotkov
- Constituency: 25th district

Personal details
- Born: June 3, 1984 (age 41) Missoula, Montana, U.S.
- Party: Republican
- Education: Great Falls College (AS); Montana State University (BS)

Jeremy Trebas (born June 3, 1984) is an American politician who is serving in the Montana Senate from the 10th district since 2025 and previously in the 13th district from 2023 to 2025 and in the Montana House of Representatives from the 26th district from 2021 to 2023 and previously in the 25th district from 2017 to 2019.
