= Jason Ellsworth =

American politician

President of the Montana Senate
- In office January 2, 2023 – January 6, 2025
- Preceded by: Mark Blasdel
- Succeeded by: Matt Regier

President pro tempore of the Montana Senate
- In office January 4, 2021 – January 2, 2023
- Preceded by: Mark Blasdel
- Succeeded by: Kenneth Bogner

Member of the Montana Senate from the 43rd district
- Incumbent
- Assumed office January 7, 2019
- Preceded by: Patrick Connell
- Succeeded by: David Bedey

Personal details
- Born: 1973 (age 52–53) Laconia, New Hampshire, U.S.
- Party: Republican
- Children: 4
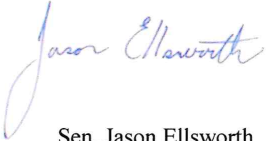
- Signature

Jason Ellsworth is an American politician serving as a Republican member of the Montana Senate. First elected in 2019, Ellsworth serves as the President pro Tempore of the Montana Senate.

== Political career ==
After being selected President Pro Tempore of the Montana Senate around December 2022, Ellsworth gave a speech in which he said, "We're going to have an opportunity next session, because we're going to have a supermajority, to potentially pass constitutional initiatives, and give those votes to the people." When asked by a journalist what type of constitutional amendments were being considered, Ellsworth said he did not know any specifics, and that the only reason he made the above statement was because he felt people "needed to be cognizant of that (the opportunity to pass amendments)..." It was later revealed that 38 constitutional amendments were being drafted at the time, according to the state legislature's own website.

=== 2025 ===
Ellsworth was a part of a moderate coalition of 9 Republicans formed with Democrats in the 69th Montana Legislature, dubbed the "nasty nine" by opponents and was censured on March 27 for his efforts.

== Legal issues ==
In January 2021, Ellsworth was stopped for speeding on the interstate near Helena and told the trooper that he was late to a meeting with Governor Greg Gianforte. The trooper let him go without issuing a ticket.

In May 2021, Ellsworth was stopped again by a highway patrol trooper en route to Helena on suspicion of speeding, having been clocked doing 88 mph. In the encounter, Ellsworth threatened to contact the state's attorney general on the officer and claimed he couldn't be arrested because he was a lawmaker on his way to legislative work. Ellsworth was subsequently charged for speeding through a construction zone or an alternative charge of reckless driving and obstructing a peace officer.

In 2026, he was convicted of misconduct in public office.

Montana Senate
| Preceded by Mark Blasdel | President pro tempore of the Montana Senate; 2021–2023 | Succeeded by Kenneth Bogner |
Political offices
| Preceded by Mark Blasdel | President of the Montana Senate; 2023–2025 | Succeeded by Matt Regier |
