= Jennifer Pomnichowski =

American politician

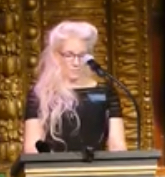
- Pomnichowski in 2015

Member of the Montana Senate from the 33rd district
- In office January 5, 2015 – January 2, 2023
- Preceded by: Mike Phillips
- Succeeded by: Denise Hayman

Member of the Montana House of Representatives
- Preceded by: Pat Wagman
- Succeeded by: Denise Hayman
- Constituency: 66th District (2013-2015); 63rd District (2007-2013)

Personal details
- Born: January 26, 1967 (age 59) Great Falls, Montana
- Party: Democratic
- Education: Montana State University (BS)

Jennifer "JP" Pomnichowski (born January 26, 1967) is an American politician and a Democratic member of the Montana Senate. Pomnichowski served as a member of the Montana House of Representatives from 2007 to 2011 and from 2013 to 2015.
