= Pat Flowers (politician) =

American politician

Minority Leader of the Montana Senate
- Incumbent
- Assumed office January 2, 2023
- Preceded by: Jill Cohenour

Member of the Montana Senate from the 32nd district
- Incumbent
- Assumed office January 7, 2019
- Preceded by: Jedediah Hinkle

Personal details
- Born: Patrick Joseph Flowers; March 2, 1956 (age 70) Akron, Ohio, U.S.
- Party: Democratic
- Spouse(s): Hedvig Rappe-Flowers (died 2007); Melissa Blessing
- Children: 4 (including 2 stepchildren)
- Education: University of Montana (BS, MS)

Patrick Joseph Flowers (born March 2, 1956) is an American politician who has served in the Montana Senate representing District 32 since 2019. He is a member of the Montana Democratic Party and has served as Minority Leader of the Senate since 2023.

== Early life and career ==
Flowers was born in Akron, Ohio and graduated from the University of Montana with a Bachelor of Science in forestry as well as a Master of Science in forest economics. After graduating, he worked at the Montana Department of Natural Resources and Conservation including as chief of the Forestry Management Bureau. He then worked as the Region 3 supervisor of the Montana Department of Fish, Wildlife and Parks for 31 years before retiring in August 2014.

== Electoral history ==
=== 2018 ===
Montana Senate 32nd district general election, 2018
Party	Candidate	Votes	%
Democratic	Pat Flowers	5,979	50.38%
Republican	Jedediah Hinkle (incumbent)	5,552	46.79%
Libertarian	Francis Wendt	336	2.83%
Total votes		11,867	100%
Democratic gain from Republican			

=== 2022 ===
Montana Senate 32nd district general election, 2022
Party	Candidate	Votes	%
Democratic	Pat Flowers (incumbent)	5,572	52.30%
Republican	Randy Chamberlin	5,082	47.70%
Total votes		10,654	100%
Democratic hold			

== Personal life ==
Flowers was married to Hedvig Rappe-Flowers, a Nordic skier and artist who immigrated to Montana from Sweden as a teenager, until her death from cancer in 2007. They have two daughters, Erika and Nicole. He currently resides in Belgrade, Montana, with his wife Melissa Blessing and has two stepdaughters.

Montana Senate
Preceded by Jill Cohenour	Minority Leader of the Montana Senate; 2023–present	Incumbent
