= Russel Tempel =

American politician (born 1947)

Member of the Montana Senate from the 14th district
- Incumbent
- Assumed office 2017

Personal details
- Born: Russel E. Tempel; 1947 (age 78–79) Havre, Montana, U.S.
- Party: Republican
- Spouse: Judy
- Children: 4
- Profession: Politician

Military service
- Allegiance: United States
- Branch/service: United States Army

Russel E. Tempel (born 1947) is an American politician. He serves as a Republican member of the Montana Senate, where he represents District 14, including Chester, Montana. Tempel was a part of a moderate coalition of nine Republicans formed with Democrats in the 69th Montana Legislature, dubbed the "nasty nine" by opponents and was censured on March 27 for his efforts.
