= Montana Legislature =

Legislative branch of the state government of Montana

Montana State Legislature

Type
- Type: Bicameral
- Houses: Senate; House of Representatives
- Term limits: Senate: 2 terms (8 years); House: 4 terms (8 years)

Leadership
- Senate President: Matt Regier (R) since January 6, 2025
- House Speaker: Brandon Ler (R) since January 6, 2025

Structure
- Seats: 150: 50 senators; 100 representatives
- Senate political groups: Republican (32); Democratic (18)
- House of Representatives political groups: Republican (58); Democratic (42)
- Length of term: Senate: 4 years House: 2 years
- Salary: $90.64/day + per diem

Elections
- Last Senate election: November 5, 2024
- Last House of Representatives election: November 5, 2024
- Next Senate election: November 3, 2026
- Next House of Representatives election: November 3, 2026
- Redistricting: Montana Districting and Apportionment Commission

Meeting place
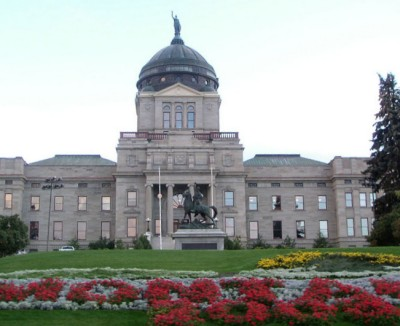
- Montana State Capitol; Helena

Website
- www.leg.mt.gov

The Montana State Legislature is the state legislature of the U.S. state of Montana. It is composed of the 100-member Montana House of Representatives and the 50-member Montana Senate.

The Montana Constitution dictates that the legislature meet in regular session for no longer than 90 days in each odd-numbered year. The primary work of the legislature is to pass a balanced biennial budget which must then be approved by the governor. If the governor vetoes a bill, the legislature may override the veto by a two-thirds vote.

Since the beginning of statehood for Montana, the legislature has been split along party lines fairly consistently and evenly. Since adoption of the current state constitution in 1972, which mandated single-member legislative districts for the first time in the state's history, the Montana Senate has been controlled by Democrats in 9 sessions and Republicans in 16 sessions. During the same period, the Montana House has been controlled by Democrats in 8 sessions and Republicans in 15 sessions, with two ties. According to state law, in the instance of a tie, control goes to the party of the sitting governor. The 67th Legislature (2021–2022) was controlled by the Republican Party with the House having 67 Republican members and 33 Democratic members; the Senate has 31 Republican and 19 Democratic members.

The 68th Legislature (2023-2024) was controlled by a Republican "supermajority," meaning that Republicans controlled two-thirds of the seats in both the House of Representatives and the Senate, allowing them to override gubernatorial vetoes and potentially pass proposals for amendments to the Montana Constitution.

Members are limited to serving no more than eight years in either chamber, but the term limit is consecutive, not lifetime.

Legislative districts are redrawn every ten years, after each census. The new boundaries, after the 2020 census, became effective starting with the 2024 elections.

The Montana State Legislature meets in the state capitol in Helena.

== See also ==
- Montana State Capitol
- Montana State Government
- List of Montana state legislatures
