= Montana Senate =

Upper house of the Montana Legislature

Coordinates: 46°35′09″N 112°01′06″W

Montana State Senate
- Montana Legislature

Type
- Type: Upper house
- Term limits: 2 terms (8 years)

History
- New session started: January 6, 2025

Leadership
- President: Matt Regier (R) since January 6, 2025
- President pro tempore: Kenneth Bogner (R) since January 2, 2023
- Majority Leader: Tom McGillvray (R) since January 6, 2025
- Minority Leader: Pat Flowers (D) since January 2, 2023

Structure
- Seats: 50
- Political groups: Majority: Republican (32) (Note: An effective working majority of 9 Republicans and all 18 Democrats governs the chamber.); Minority: Democratic (18)
- Length of term: 4 years
- Authority: Article V, Section 2, Montana Constitution
- Salary: $128.88/day + per diem

Elections
- Last election: November 5, 2024 (25 seats)
- Next election: November 3, 2026 (25 seats)
- Redistricting: Montana Districting and Apportionment Commission

Meeting place
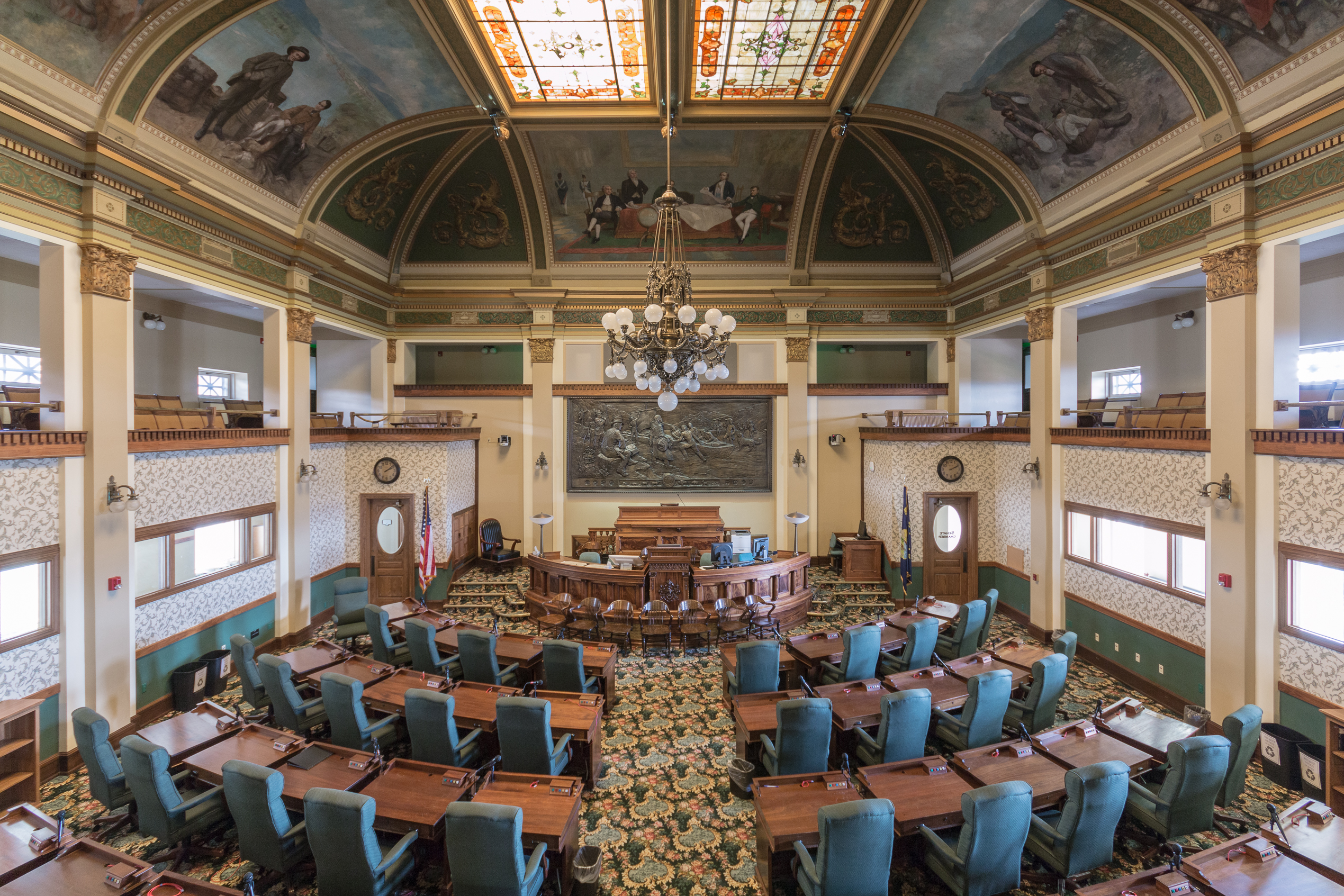
- Senate Chamber; Montana State Capitol; Helena, Montana

Website
- Montana Senate

The Montana State Senate is, along with the Montana House of Representatives, one of the two houses that composes the Montana Legislature, the state legislative branch of the U.S. state of Montana. The body is composed of 50 senators elected for four years. Half of the Senate is up for election every two years.

== Composition of the Senate ==
69th Legislature – 2025–2026

Affiliation	Party (Shading indicates majority caucus)		Total	Vacant
Affiliation	Republican	Democratic	Total	Vacant
65th Legislature (2019–2020)	30	20	50	0
67th Legislature (2021–2022)	31	19	50	0
68th Legislature (2023–2024)	34	16	50	0
69th Legislature (2025–2026)	32	18	50	0
Latest voting share	64%	36%		

=== Members of the Montana Senate ===
Montana limits its State Senators to two four-year terms (8 years) in any 16-year period.

=== Senate members ===
District	Name	Party	Residence	Start	Term Limited
1	Mike Cuffe	Rep	Eureka	2018	Yes
2	Dave Fern	Dem	Whitefish	2024	No
3	Carl Glimm	Rep	Kila	2020	No
4	John Fuller	Rep	Kalispell	2022	No
5	Matt Regier	Rep	Kalispell	2024	No
6	Mark Noland	Rep	Bigfork	2022	No
7	Greg Hertz	Rep	Polson	2020	No
8	Susan Webber	Dem	Browning	2018	Yes
9	Bruce Gillespie	Rep	Ethridge	2018	Yes
10	Jeremy Trebas	Rep	Great Falls	2022	No
11	Daniel Emrich	Rep	Great Falls	2022	No
12	Wendy McKamey	Rep	Great Falls	2022	No
13	Joshua Kassmier	Rep	Fort Benton	2024	No
14	Russel Tempel	Rep	Chester	2018	Yes
15	Gregg Hunter	Rep	Glasgow	2024	No
16	Jonathan Windy Boy	Dem	Box Elder	2024	No
17	Bob Phalen	Rep	Lindsay	2024	No
18	Kenneth Bogner	Rep	Miles City	2018	Yes
19	Barry Usher	Rep	Billings	2022	No
20	Sue Vinton	Rep	Billings	2024	No
21	Gayle Lammers	Rep	Hardin	2024	No
22	Daniel Zolnikov	Rep	Billings	2022	No
23	Emma Kerr-Carpenter	Dem	Billings	2024 (Note: Appointed.)	No
24	Mike Yakawich	Rep	Billings	2024	No
25	Dennis Lenz	Rep	Billings	2022	No
26	Tom McGillvray	Rep	Billings	2020	No
27	Vince Ricci	Rep	Billings	2024	No
28	Forrest Mandeville	Rep	Columbus	2022	No
29	John Esp	Rep	Big Timber	2018	Yes
30	Cora Neumann	Dem	Helena	2024	No
31	Pat Flowers	Dem	Belgrade	2018	Yes
32	Denise Hayman	Dem	Bozeman	2022	No
33	Christopher Pope	Dem	Bozeman	2020	No
34	Shelley Vance	Rep	Belgrade	2022	No
35	Tony Tezak	Rep	Ennis	2024	No
36	Sara Novak	Dem	Anaconda	2024	No
37	Derek J. Harvey	Dem	Butte	2024	No
38	Becky Beard	Rep	Elliston	2024	No
39	Wylie Galt	Rep	Martinsdale	2024	No
40	Laura Smith	Dem	Helena	2024	No
41	Janet Ellis	Dem	Helena	2018	Yes
42	Mary Ann Dunwell	Dem	Helena	2022	No
43	Jason Ellsworth	Rep	Hamilton	2018	Yes
44	Theresa Manzella	Rep	Hamilton	2020	No
45	Denley Loge	Rep	St. Regis	2024	No
46	Jacinda Morigeau	Dem	Arlee	2024	No
47	Ellie Boldman	Dem	Missoula	2020	No
48	Andrea Olsen	Dem	Missoula	2022	No
49	Willis Curdy	Dem	Missoula	2022	No
50	Shane Morigeau	Dem	Missoula	2022	No

== See also ==
- Montana Legislature
- Montana House of Representatives
- List of Montana state legislatures
