= 2020 Montana Senate election =

- November 3, 2020

50 seats in the Montana Senate 26 seats needed for a majority
- Turnout: 38.07%
	Majority party	Minority party
Leader	Scott Sales (term-limited)	Jon Sesso (term-limited)
Party	Republican	Democratic
Leader since	January 2, 2017	January 5, 2015
Leader's seat	35th – Bozeman	37th – Butte
Last election	30	20
Seats won	31	19
Seat change	▲1	▼1
Popular vote	184,066	97,474
Percentage	64.24%	34.02%
- Results: Republican gain Democratic gain Republican hold Democratic hold No election
Senate President before election
Scott Sales
Republican
Elected Senate President
Mark Blasdel
Republican

An election was held November 3, 2020, to elect 25 members to Montana's Senate. The election coincided with elections for other offices, including the presidency, U.S Senate, U.S. House of Representatives, governorship, and state house. The primary election was held on June 2, 2020.

== Predictions ==
Source	Ranking	As of
The Cook Political Report	Safe R	October 21, 2020

== Results summary ==
Summary of the November 3, 2020 Montana Senate election results

Party	Votes		Seats		
Party	No.	%	No.	+/−	%
Republican	184,066	64.24	31	+1	62.00
Democratic	97,474	34.02	19	−1	38.00
Libertarian	3,722	1.30	0	0	0.00
Write-in	1,261	0.44	0	0	0.00
Total	286,523	100.00	50	±0	100.00
Registered voters	752,538	100.00			
Turnout	286,523	38.07			
Source: Montana Elections Results, Montana Secretary of State

Popular vote
Republican	64.24%
Democratic	34.02%
Libertarian	1.30%

Senate seats
Republican	62.00%
Democratic	38.00%

=== Close races ===
Districts where the margin of victory was under 10%:

1. District 38, 0.44%
2. District 39, 1.64%
3. District 25, 3.27%
4. District 26, 5.1% gain
5. District 47, 9.28%

=== Incumbents defeated in the primary election ===
- Tom Richmond (R-District 28), defeated by Brad Molnar (R)

=== Incumbents defeated in the general election ===
- Margaret MacDonald (D-District 26), defeated by Chris Friedel (R)

== Summary of results by State Senate district ==
State Senate district	Incumbent	Party	Elected Senator	Party
Montana 2	Dee Brown	Rep	Carl Glimm	Rep
Montana 3	Keith Regier	Rep	Keith Regier	Rep
Montana 6	Albert Olszewski	Rep	Greg Hertz	Rep
Montana 7	Jennifer Fielder	Rep	Bob Brown	Rep
Montana 10	Steve Fitzpatrick	Rep	Steve Fitzpatrick	Rep
Montana 15	Ryan Osmundson	Rep	Ryan Osmundson	Rep
Montana 16	Frank Smith	Dem	Mike Fox	Dem
Montana 17	Mike Lang	Rep	Mike Lang	Rep
Montana 18	Steve Hinebauch	Rep	Steve Hinebauch	Rep
Montana 21	Jason Small	Rep	Jason Small	Rep
Montana 23	Roger Webb	Rep	Tom McGillvray	Rep
Montana 25	Jen Gross	Dem	Jen Gross	Dem
Montana 26	Margaret MacDonald	Dem	Chris Friedel	Rep
Montana 28	Tom Richmond*	Rep	Brad Molnar	Rep
Montana 31	Mike Phillips	Dem	Christopher Pope	Dem
Montana 35	Scott Sales	Rep	Walt Sales	Rep
Montana 36	Jeffrey Welborn	Rep	Jeffrey Welborn	Rep
Montana 37	Jon Sesso	Dem	Ryan Lynch	Dem
Montana 38	Edith McClafferty	Dem	Edith McClafferty	Dem
Montana 39	Gene Vuckovich	Dem	Mark Sweeney	Dem
Montana 40	Terry Gauthier	Rep	Terry Gauthier	Rep
Montana 44	Fred Thomas	Rep	Theresa Manzella	Rep
Montana 45	Dick Barrett	Dem	Ellie Boldman	Dem
Montana 46	Sue Malek	Dem	Shannon O'Brien	Dem
Montana 47	Dan Salomon	Rep	Daniel Salomon	Rep

== Detailed results ==
=== Districts 2–25 ===
==== District 2 ====
Incumbent Republican Dee Brown had represented the 2nd district since 2013. Brown was term-limited and could not seek re-election. State Representative Carl Glimm won the open seat.

Montana Senate 2nd district general election, 2020
Party	Candidate	Votes	%
Republican	Carl Glimm	8,760	68.30%
Democratic	Kyle Waterman	4,066	31.70%
Total votes		12,826	100%
Republican hold			

==== District 3 ====
Incumbent Republican Keith Regier had represented the 3rd district since 2017.

Montana Senate 3rd district general election, 2020
Party	Candidate	Votes	%
Republican	Keith Regier (incumbent)	8,334	55.85%
Democratic	Guthrie Quist	6,588	44.15%
Total votes		14,922	100%
Republican hold			

==== District 6 ====
Incumbent Republican Albert Olszewski had represented the 6th district since 2017. Olszewski unsuccessfully sought the Republican nomination for Governor. Term-limited state representative and state House Speaker Greg Hertz won the open seat.

Montana Senate 6th district general election, 2020
Party	Candidate	Votes	%
Republican	Greg Hertz	10,305	100%
Total votes		10,305	100%
Republican hold			

==== District 7 ====
Incumbent Republican Jennifer Fielder had represented the 7th district since 2013. Fielder was term-limited and ran successfully for a seat on the Montana Public Service Commission.

Montana Senate 7th district general election, 2020
Party	Candidate	Votes	%
Republican	Bob Brown	9,560	75.00%
Democratic	Diane L. Magone	3,187	25.00%
Total votes		12,747	100%
Republican hold			

==== District 10 ====
Incumbent Steve Fitzpatrick had represented the 10th district since 2017.

Montana Senate 10th district general election, 2020
Party	Candidate	Votes	%
Republican	Steve Fitzpatrick (incumbent)	10,018	100%
Total votes		10,018	100%
Republican hold			

==== District 15 ====
Incumbent Republican Ryan Osmundson had represented the 15th district since 2017.

Montana Senate district general election, 2020
Party	Candidate	Votes	%
Republican	Ryan Osmundson (incumbent)	9,511	100%
Total votes		9,511	100%
Republican hold			

==== District 16 ====
Incumbent Democrat Frank Smith had represented the 16th district since 2017. Smith chose not to seek re-election, and instead successfully ran for a seat in the Montana House.

Montana Senate 16th district general election, 2020
Party	Candidate	Votes	%
Democratic	Mike Fox	5,718	100%
Total votes		5,718	100%
Democratic hold			

==== District 17 ====
Incumbent Republican Mike Lang had represented the 17th district since 2017.

Montana Senate 17th district general election, 2020
Party	Candidate	Votes	%
Republican	Mike Lang (incumbent)	9,385	100%
Total votes		9,385	100%
Republican hold			

==== District 18 ====
Incumbent Republican Steve Hinebauch had represented the 18th district since 2017.

Montana Senate 18th district general election, 2020
Party	Candidate	Votes	%
Republican	Steve Hinebauch (incumbent)	8,618	78.37%
Democratic	Pat Mischel	2,378	21.63%
Total votes		10,996	100%
Republican hold			

==== District 21 ====
Incumbent Republican Jason Small had represented the 21st district since 2017.

Montana Senate 21st district general election, 2020
Party	Candidate	Votes	%
Republican	Jason Small (incumbent)	4,023	57.80%
Democratic	Rae Peppers	2,937	42.20%
Total votes		6,960	100%
Republican hold			

==== District 23 ====
Incumbent Republican Roger Webb had represented the 23rd district since 2013. Webb was term-limited and could not seek re-election. Former state representative Tom McGillvray won the open seat.

Montana Senate 23rd district general election, 2020
Party	Candidate	Votes	%
Republican	Tom McGillvray	9,893	100%
Total votes		9,893	100%
Republican hold			

==== District 25 ====
Incumbent Democrat Jen Gross had represented the 25th district since 2017.

Montana Senate 25th district general election, 2020
Party	Candidate	Votes	%
Democratic	Jen Gross (incumbent)	4,146	51.45%
Republican	Scott Price	3,912	48.55%
Total votes		8,058	100%
Democratic hold			

=== Districts 26–47 ===
==== District 26 ====
Incumbent Democrat Margaret MacDonald had represented the 26th district since 2017. She ran for re-election to a 2nd term, but was defeated by Republican Chris Friedel.

Montana Senate 26th district general election, 2020
Party	Candidate	Votes	%
Republican	Chris Friedel	4,823	52.55%
Democratic	Margaret MacDonald (incumbent)	4,355	47.45%
Total votes		9,178	100%
Republican gain from Democratic			

==== District 28 ====
Incumbent Republican Tom Richmond had represented the 28th district since 2017. Former Public Service Commissioner and state representative Brad Molnar defeated Richmond in the Republican primary.

Montana Senate 28th district general election, 2020
Party	Candidate	Votes	%
Republican	Brad Molnar	8,659	100%
Total votes		8,659	100%
Republican hold			

==== District 31 ====
Incumbent Democrat Mike Phillips had represented the 31st district since 2013. Phillips was term-limited and could not seek re-election. State Representative Christopher Pope won the open seat.

Montana Senate 31st district general election, 2020
Party	Candidate	Votes	%
Democratic	Christopher Pope	11,018	66.32%
Republican	Nicolas Allevato	5,596	33.68%
Total votes		16,614	100%
Democratic hold			

==== District 35 ====
Incumbent Republican Scott Sales had represented the 35th district and its predecessors since 2013. Sales was term-limited and could not seek re-election, he instead ran Secretary of State.

Montana Senate 35th district general election, 2020
Party	Candidate	Votes	%
Republican	Walt Sales	12,191	100%
Total votes		12,191	100%
Republican hold			

==== District 36 ====
Incumbent Republican Jeffrey Welborn had represented the 36th district since 2017.

Montana Senate 36th district general election, 2020
Party	Candidate	Votes	%
Republican	Jeffrey Welborn (incumbent)	10,526	79.55%
Libertarian	John Lamb	2,706	20.45%
Total votes		13,232	100%
Republican hold			

==== District 37 ====
Incumbent Democrat Minority Leader Jon Sesso had represented the 37th district since 2013. Sesso was term-limited and could not seek re-election.

Montana Senate 37th district general election, 2020
Party	Candidate	Votes	%
Democratic	Ryan Lynch	6,141	64.79%
Republican	Aaron Meaders	3,337	35.21%
Total votes		9,478	100%
Democratic hold			

==== District 38 ====
Incumbent Democrat Edith McClafferty had represented the 38th district since 2017.

Montana Senate 38th district general election, 2020
Party	Candidate	Votes	%
Democratic	Edith McClafferty (incumbent)	6,643	50.22%
Republican	Jim Butterbaugh	6,586	49.78%
Total votes		13,229	100%
Democratic hold			

==== District 39 ====
Incumbent Democrat Gene Vuckovich had represented the 39th district since 2011. Vuckovich was term-limited and could not seek re-election.

Montana Senate 39th district general election, 2020
Party	Candidate	Votes	%
Democratic	Mark Sweeney	4,450	44.42%
Republican	Suzzann Nordwick	4,306	42.99%
Independent	Gordon Pierson (write-in)	1,261	12.59%
Total votes		10,017	100%
Democratic hold			

==== District 40 ====
Incumbent Republican Terry Gauthier had represented the 40th district since 2017.

Montana Senate 40th district general election, 2020
Party	Candidate	Votes	%
Republican	Terry Gauthier (incumbent)	8,504	60.47%
Democratic	Catherine Scott	5,560	39.53%
Total votes		14,064	100%
Republican hold			

==== District 44 ====
Incumbent Republican Majority Leader Fred Thomas had represented the 44th district since 2013. Thomas was term-limited and could not seek re-election. Representative Theresa Manzella won the open seat.

Montana Senate 44th district general election, 2020
Party	Candidate	Votes	%
Republican	Theresa Manzella	9,485	67.22%
Democratic	Margaret Gorski	4,626	32.78%
Total votes		14,111	100%
Republican hold			

==== District 45 ====
Incumbent Democrat Dick Barrett had represented the 45th district and its predecessors since 2013. Barrett was term-limited and could not seek re-election.

Montana Senate 45th district general election, 2020
Party	Candidate	Votes	%
Democratic	Ellie Boldman	7,045	61.13%
Republican	Susan Campbell Reneau	4,045	35.10%
Libertarian	Nolen W. Skime	435	3.77%
Total votes		11,525	100%
Democratic hold			

==== District 46 ====
Incumbent Democrat Sue Malek had represented the 46th district since 2013. Malek was term-limited and could not seek re-election.

Montana Senate 46th district general election, 2020
Party	Candidate	Votes	%
Democratic	Shannon O'Brien	8,362	66.06%
Republican	Niki Sardot	4,296	33.94%
Total votes		12,658	100%
Democratic hold			

==== District 47 ====
Incumbent Republican Dan Salomon had represented the 47th district since 2017.

Montana Senate 47th district general election, 2020
Party	Candidate	Votes	%
Republican	Dan Salomon (incumbent)	5,983	52.11%
Democratic	Chase Porter Gray	4,918	42.83%
Libertarian	Devin Braaten	581	5.06%
Total votes		11,482	100%
Republican hold			
