= 2016 Montana Senate election =

- November 8, 2016

25 seats in the Montana Senate 26 seats needed for a majority
	Majority party	Minority party
Leader	Debby Barrett (term-limited)	Jon Sesso
Party	Republican	Democratic
Leader since	January 5, 2015	January 5, 2015
Leader's seat	36th – Dillon	37th – Butte
Last election	29	21
Seats won	32	18
Seat change	▲3	▼3
Popular vote	143,936	97,280
Percentage	59.52%	40.22%
- Results: Republican gain Democratic gain Republican hold Democratic hold No election
Senate President before election
Debby Barrett
Republican
Elected Senate President
Scott Sales
Republican

An election was held on November 8, 2016, to elect 25 members to Montana's Senate. The election coincided with elections for other offices, including the Presidency, U.S. House of Representatives, Governorship, and state house. The primary election was held on June 7, 2016.

== Results summary ==
Party	Candi- dates	Votes		Seats		
Party	Candi- dates	No.	%	No.	+/–	%
Republican Party	23	143,936	59.52%	32	▲3	64
Democratic Party	21	97,280	40.22%	18	▼3	36
Libertarian Party	1	623	0.26%	0	Steady	0
Write-in	1	2	0.001%	0	Steady	0
Total	46	241,841	100%	50	Steady	100

Popular vote
Republican	59.517%
Democratic	40.225%
Libertarian	0.258%
Write-in	0.001%

Senate seats
Republican	64%
Democratic	36%

== Predictions ==
Source	Ranking	As of
Governing	Safe R	October 12, 2016

== Summary of results by State Senate District ==
State Senate District	Incumbent	Party	Elected Senator	Party
Montana 2	Dee Brown	Rep	Dee Brown	Rep
Montana 3	Bruce Tutvedt	Rep	Keith Regier	Rep
Montana 6	Janna Taylor	Rep	Albert Olszewski	Rep
Montana 7	Jennifer Fielder	Rep	Jennifer Fielder	Rep
Montana 10	Rick Ripley	Rep	Steve Fitzpatrick	Rep
Montana 15	Brad Hamlett	Dem	Ryan Osmundson	Rep
Montana 16	Jonathan Windy Boy	Dem	Frank Smith	Dem
Montana 17	John Brenden	Rep	Mike Lang	Rep
Montana 18	Matt Rosendale	Rep	Steve Hinebauch	Rep
Montana 21	Sharon Stewart-Peregoy	Dem	Jason Small	Rep
Montana 23	Roger Webb	Rep	Roger Webb	Rep
Montana 25	Robyn Driscoll	Dem	Jen Gross	Dem
Montana 26	Elsie Arntzen	Rep	Margaret MacDonald	Dem
Montana 28	Taylor Brown	Rep	Tom Richmond	Rep
Montana 31	Mike Phillips	Dem	Mike Phillips	Dem
Montana 35	Scott Sales	Rep	Scott Sales	Rep
Montana 36	Debby Barrett	Rep	Jeff Welborn	Rep
Montana 37	Jon Sesso	Dem	Jon Sesso	Dem
Montana 38	Jim Keane	Dem	Edith McClafferty	Dem
Montana 39	Gene Vuckovich	Dem	Gene Vuckovich	Dem
Montana 40	Christine Kaufmann	Dem	Terry Gauthier	Rep
Montana 44	Fred Thomas	Rep	Fred Thomas	Rep
Montana 45	Dick Barrett	Dem	Dick Barrett	Dem
Montana 46	Sue Malek	Dem	Sue Malek	Dem
Montana 47	Cliff Larsen	Dem	Dan Salomon	Rep

== Detailed Results ==
=== Districts 2–25 ===
==== District 2 ====
Incumbent Republican Dee Brown has represented the 2nd district since 2013.

Montana Senate 2nd district general election, 2016
Party	Candidate	Votes	%
Republican	Dee Brown (incumbent)	7,961	100%
Total votes		7,961	100%
Republican hold			

==== District 3 ====
Incumbent Republican Bruce Tutvedt has represented the 3rd district since 2009. Tutvedt was term-limited and could not seek re-election. State Representative Keith Regier won the open seat.

Montana Senate 3rd district general election, 2016
Party	Candidate	Votes	%
Republican	Keith Regier	6,511	56.83%
Democratic	Melissa L. Hartman	4,946	43.17%
Total votes		11,457	100%
Republican hold			

==== District 6 ====
Incumbent Republican Janna Taylor has represented the 6th district since 2013. Taylor didn't seek re-election. State Representative Albert Olszewski won the open seat.

Montana Senate 6th district general election, 2016
Party	Candidate	Votes	%
Republican	Albert Olszewski	7,370	72.03%
Democratic	Rolf Harmsen	2,862	27.97%
Total votes		10,232	100%
Republican hold			

==== District 7 ====
Incumbent Republican Jennifer Fielder has represented the 7th district since 2013.

Montana Senate 7th district general election, 2016
Party	Candidate	Votes	%
Republican	Jennifer Fielder (incumbent)	6,761	67.19%
Democratic	Mark Sheets	3,300	32.79%
Independent	Glenn Ferren (write-in)	2	0.02%
Total votes		10,063	100%
Republican hold			

==== District 10 ====
Incumbent Rick Ripley has represented the 10th district since 2009. Ripley was term-limited and could not seek re-election.

Montana Senate 10th district general election, 2016
Party	Candidate	Votes	%
Republican	Steve Fitzpatrick	7,851	76.95%
Democratic	Deborah L. Magin	2,352	23.05%
Total votes		10,203	100%
Republican hold			

==== District 15 ====
Incumbent Democrat Brad Hamlett has represented the 15th district since 2009. Hamlett was term-limited and he successfully ran for the Montana house. Republican state representative Ryan Osmundson won the open seat.

Montana Senate district general election, 2016
Party	Candidate	Votes	%
Republican	Ryan Osmundson	7,806	76.85%
Democratic	Sean McConnaha	2,351	23.15%
Total votes		10,157	100%
Republican gain from Democratic			

==== District 16 ====
Incumbent Democrat Jonathan Windy Boy has represented the 16th district since 2009. Windy Boy was term-limited and he successfully ran for the Montana house. Former state Senator Frank Smith won the open seat.

Montana Senate 16th district general election, 2016
Party	Candidate	Votes	%
Democratic	Frank Smith	3,752	57.41%
Republican	G. Bruce Meyers	2,783	42.59%
Total votes		6,535	100%
Democratic hold			

==== District 17 ====
Incumbent Republican John Brenden has represented the 17th district since 2009. Brenden was term-limited and could not seek re-election.

Montana Senate 17th district general election, 2016
Party	Candidate	Votes	%
Republican	Mike Lang	7,732	77.73%
Democratic	Douglas Adolphson	2,215	22.27%
Total votes		9,947	100%
Republican hold			

==== District 18 ====
Incumbent Republican Matt Rosendale has represented the 18th district since 2013. Rosendale retired and successfully ran for state auditor.

Montana Senate 18th district general election, 2016
Party	Candidate	Votes	%
Republican	Steve Hinebauch	8,531	100%
Total votes		8,531	100%
Republican hold			

==== District 21 ====
Incumbent Democrat Sharon Stewart-Peregoy has represented the 21st district since 2009. Stewart-Peregoy was term-limited and she successfully ran for the Montana house.

Montana Senate 21st district general election, 2016
Party	Candidate	Votes	%
Republican	Jason Small	3,277	51.49%
Democratic	Carolyn Pease-Lopez	3,087	48.51%
Total votes		6,364	100%
Republican gain from Democratic			

==== District 23 ====
Incumbent Republican Roger Webb has represented the 23rd district since 2013.

Montana Senate 23rd district general election, 2016
Party	Candidate	Votes	%
Republican	Roger Webb (incumbent)	6,652	66.15%
Democratic	Paul J. Van Tricht	3,404	33.85%
Total votes		10,056	100%
Republican hold			

==== District 25 ====
Incumbent Democrat Robyn Driscoll has represented the 25th district and its predecessors since 2013. Driscoll didn't seek re-election.

Montana Senate 25th district general election, 2016
Party	Candidate	Votes	%
Democratic	Jen Gross	3,591	50.68%
Republican	Donna Huston	3,495	49.32%
Total votes		7,086	100%
Democratic hold			

=== Districts 26–47 ===
==== District 26 ====
Incumbent Republican Elsie Arntzen has represented the 26th district and its predecessors since 2013. Arntzen retired to run for Montana Superintendent of Public Instruction. Democratic state representative Margaret MacDonald won the open seat.

Montana Senate 26th district general election, 2016
Party	Candidate	Votes	%
Democratic	Margaret MacDonald	7,658	50.14%
Republican	Donald Roberts	7,614	49.86%
Total votes		15,272	100%
Democratic gain from Republican			

==== District 28 ====
Incumbent Republican Taylor Brown has represented the 28th district since 2009. Brown was term-limited and could not seek re-election.

Montana Senate 28th district general election, 2016
Party	Candidate	Votes	%
Republican	Tom Richmond	5,743	66.92%
Democratic	Deborah Abbey	2,839	33.08%
Total votes		8,582	100%
Republican hold			

==== District 31 ====
Incumbent Democrat Mike Phillips has represented the 31st district since 2013.

Montana Senate 31st district general election, 2016
Party	Candidate	Votes	%
Democratic	Mike Phillips (incumbent)	10,295	100%
Total votes		10,295	100%
Democratic hold			

==== District 35 ====
Incumbent Republican Scott Sales has represented the 35th district and its predecessors since 2013.

Montana Senate 35th district general election, 2016
Party	Candidate	Votes	%
Republican	Scott Sales (incumbent)	9,408	100%
Total votes		9,408	100%
Republican hold			

==== District 36 ====
Incumbent Republican Senate President Debby Barrett has represented the 36th district since 2009. Barrett was term-limited and could not seek re-election.

Montana Senate 36th district general election, 2016
Party	Candidate	Votes	%
Republican	Jeff Welborn	9,785	100%
Total votes		9,785	100%
Republican hold			

==== District 37 ====
Incumbent Democrat Minority Leader Jon Sesso has represented the 37th district since 2013.

Montana Senate 37th district general election, 2016
Party	Candidate	Votes	%
Democratic	Jon Sesso (incumbent)	7,244	100%
Total votes		7,244	100%
Democratic hold			

==== District 38 ====
Incumbent Democrat Jim Keane has represented the 38th district since 2009. Keane was term-limited and he successfully ran for the Montana house. State representative Edith McClafferty won the open seat.

Montana Senate 38th district general election, 2016
Party	Candidate	Votes	%
Democratic	Edith McClafferty	6,113	53.50%
Republican	Glenn J. Rosenbaum	5,314	46.50%
Total votes		11,427	100%
Democratic hold			

==== District 39 ====
Incumbent Democrat Gene Vuckovich has represented the 39th district since 2011.

Montana Senate 39th district general election, 2016
Party	Candidate	Votes	%
Democratic	Gene Vuckovich (incumbent)	4,686	53.23%
Republican	Suzzann Nordwick	3,494	39.69%
Libertarian	Dick Motta	623	7.08%
Total votes		8,803	100%
Democratic hold			

==== District 40 ====
Incumbent Democrat Christine Kaufmann has represented the 40th district since 2007. Kaufmann was term-limited and could not seek re-election.

Montana Senate 40th district general election, 2016
Party	Candidate	Votes	%
Republican	Terry Gauthier	6,135	52.69%
Democratic	Hal Jacobson	5,509	47.31%
Total votes		11,644	100%
Republican gain from Democratic			

==== District 44 ====
Incumbent Republican Majority Leader Fred Thomas has represented the 44th district since 2013.

Montana Senate 44th district general election, 2016
Party	Candidate	Votes	%
Republican	Fred Thomas (incumbent)	7,614	70.03%
Democratic	James R. Olsen	3,258	29.97%
Total votes		10,872	100%
Republican hold			

==== District 45 ====
Incumbent Democrat Dick Barrett has represented the 45th district and its predecessors since 2013.

Montana Senate 45th district general election, 2016
Party	Candidate	Votes	%
Democratic	Dick Barrett (incumbent)	6,372	64.82%
Republican	Sashin Hume	3,459	35.18%
Total votes		9,831	100%
Democratic hold			

==== District 46 ====
Incumbent Democrat Sue Malek has represented the 46th district since 2013.

Montana Senate 46th district general election, 2016
Party	Candidate	Votes	%
Democratic	Sue Malek (incumbent)	7,003	64.80%
Republican	Adam S. Pummill	3,804	35.20%
Total votes		10,807	100%
Democratic hold			

==== District 47 ====
Incumbent Democrat Cliff Larsen has represented the 47th district since 2009. Larsen was term-limited and could not seek re-election. Republican state representative Dan Salomon won the open seat.

Montana Senate 47th district general election, 2016
Party	Candidate	Votes	%
Republican	Dan Salomon	4,836	52.12%
Democratic	Tom France	4,443	47.88%
Total votes		9,279	100%
Republican gain from Democratic			
