= 2024 Montana Senate election =

Montana state election

- November 5, 2024

25 of 50 seats in the Montana Senate 26 seats needed for a majority
- Turnout: 76.57%
| | Majority party | Minority party |
|---|---|---|
| Leader | Jason Ellsworth | Pat Flowers |
| Party | Republican | Democratic |
| Leader since | January 2, 2023 | January 2, 2023 |
| Leader's seat | 43rd | 32nd |
| Last election | 34 | 16 |
| Seats won | 32 | 18 |
| Seat change | ▼2 | ▲2 |
| Popular vote | 168,148 | 103,422 |
| Percentage | 61.68% | 37.94% |
| Swing | ▼1.88 | ▲1.50 |
- Results: Republican gain Democratic gain Republican hold Democratic hold No election
Senate President before election
Jason Ellsworth
Republican
Elected Senate President
Matt Regier
Republican

The 2024 Montana Senate election was held on November 5, 2024, alongside the 2024 United States elections.

This was the first election under new legislative lines adopted by an independent, bipartisan commission in 2023.

Although Republicans maintained their majority, Democrats won new seats and ended Republicans' veto-proof supermajority.

== Retirements ==
Fifteen incumbents did not seek re-election.

=== Democrats ===
1. District 16: Mike Fox retired to run for State House.
2. District 25: Jen Gross was term-limited.
3. District 37: Ryan Lynch retired.
4. District 38: Edith McClafferty was term-limited.
5. District 46: Shannon O'Brien retired to run for Superintendent of Public Instruction.

=== Republicans ===
1. District 3: Keith Regier was term-limited.
2. District 7: Greg Hinkle retired.
3. District 10: Steve Fitzpatrick was term-limited (run for State House).
4. District 17: Mike Lang was term-limited.
5. District 18: Steve Hinebauch was term-limited.
6. District 21: Jason Small was term-limited.
7. District 28: Brad Molnar retired to run for Public Service Commission.
8. District 35: Walt Sales retired.
9. District 36: Jeffrey Welborn was term-limited (ran for Public Service Commission).
10. District 47: Daniel Salomon was term-limited.

== Incumbents defeated ==
=== In primary election ===
One incumbent senator, a Republican, was defeated in the June 4 primary election.

==== Republicans ====
1. District 26: Chris Friedel lost renomination to Vince Ricci.

== Predictions ==
| Source | Ranking | As of |
|---|---|---|
| CNalysis | Solid R | June 13, 2024 |

== Results summary ==
Summary of the November 5, 2024 Montana Senate election results

| Party | Votes | | Seats | | |
| Party | No. | % | No. | +/− | % |
|---|---|---|---|---|---|
| Republican | 184,066 | 64.24 | 32 | −2 | 62.00 |
| Democratic | 97,474 | 34.02 | 18 | +2 | 38.00 |
| Libertarian | 3,722 | 1.30 | 0 | 0 | 0.00 |
| Write-in | 1,261 | 0.44 | 0 | 0 | 0.00 |
| Total | 612,309 | 100.00 | 50 | ±0 | 100.00 |
| Registered voters | 802,206 | 100.00 | | | |
| Turnout | 612,309 | 76.33 | | | |
Source: Montana Elections Results, Montana Secretary of State

Popular vote
| Republican | 64.24% |
| Democratic | 34.02% |
| Libertarian | 1.30% |

Senate seats
| Republican | 64.00% |
| Democratic | 36.00% |

=== Close races ===
Districts where the margin of victory was under 10%:

1. District 2, 4.0%
2. District 24, 8.0%
3. District 40, 8.0%

== Summary of results by State Senate district ==
| State Senate district | Incumbent | Party | Elected Senator | Party |
|---|---|---|---|---|
| Montana 2 | Carl Glimm | Rep | Dave Fern | Dem |
| Montana 3 | Keith Regier | Rep | Carl Glimm | Rep |
| Montana 5 | Mark Noland | Rep | Matt Reiger | Rep |
| Montana 7 | Greg Hinkle | Rep | Greg Hertz | Rep |
| Montana 13 | Jeremy Trebas | Rep | Joshua Kassmier | Rep |
| Montana 15 | Dan Bartel | Rep | Gregg Hunter | Rep |
| Montana 16 | Mike Fox | Dem | Jonathan Windy Boy | Dem |
| Montana 17 | Mike Lang | Rep | Bob Phalen | Rep |
| Montana 20 | Barry Usher | Rep | Sue Vinton | Rep |
| Montana 21 | Jason Small | Rep | Gayle Lammers | Rep |
| Montana 24 | Kathy Kelker | Dem | Mike Yakawich | Rep |
| Montana 26 | Chris Friedel | Rep | Tom McGillvray | Rep |
| Montana 27 | Dennis Lenz | Rep | Vince Ricci | Rep |
| Montana 30 | John Esp | Rep | Cora Neumann | Dem |
| Montana 33 | Denise Hayman | Dem | Christopher Pope | Dem |
| Montana 35 | Walt Sales | Rep | Tony Tezak | Rep |
| Montana 36 | Jeffrey Welborn | Rep | Sara Novak | Dem |
| Montana 37 | Ryan Lynch | Dem | Derek J. Harvey | Dem |
| Montana 38 | Edith McClafferty | Dem | Becky Beard | Rep |
| Montana 39 | Terry Vermeire | Rep | Wylie Galt | Rep |
| Montana 40 | Becky Beard | Rep | Laura Smith | Dem |
| Montana 44 | Theresa Manzella | Rep | Theresa Manzella | Rep |
| Montana 45 | Ellie Boldman | Dem | Denley Loge | Rep |
| Montana 46 | Shannon O'Brien | Dem | Jacinda Morigeau | Dem |
| Montana 47 | Dan Salomon | Rep | Ellie Boldman | Dem |

== Detailed results ==
=== District 2 ===
Incumbent Republican Carl Glimm had represented the 2nd district since 2021. Due to redistricting, Glimm decided to run in the 3rd district.

Montana Senate 2nd district general election, 2024
| Party | Candidate | Votes | % |
|---|---|---|---|
| Democratic | Dave Fern | 6,860 | 52% |
| Republican | Doug Adams | 6,227 | 48% |
| Total votes | | 13,087 | 100% |
| Democratic gain from Republican | | | |

=== District 3 ===
Incumbent Republican Keith Regier had represented the 3rd district since 2017. Regier was term-limited and could not seek re-election.

Montana Senate 3rd district general election, 2024
| Party | Candidate | Votes | % |
|---|---|---|---|
| Republican | Carl Glimm | 9,590 | 70% |
| Democratic | Angela Kennedy | 4,100 | 30% |
| Total votes | | 13,690 | 100% |

=== District 5 ===
Incumbent Republican Mark Noland had represented the 6th district since 2023.

Montana Senate 5th district general election, 2024
| Party | Candidate | Votes | % |
|---|---|---|---|
| Republican | Matt Regier | 9,157 | 74% |
| Democratic | Link Neimark | 3,162 | 26% |
| Total votes | | 12,319 | 100% |

=== District 7 ===
Incumbent Republican Greg Hinkle had represented the 7th district since 2024. He is now retiring.

Montana Senate 7th district general election, 2024
| Party | Candidate | Votes | % |
|---|---|---|---|
| Republican | Greg Hertz | 9,271 | 73% |
| Democratic | Craig Pablo | 3,472 | 27% |
| Total votes | | 12,743 | 100% |

=== District 13 ===
The Secretary of State does not specify who received the other 2% of the vote or how many votes for candidates other than Kassmier there were.

Montana Senate 13th district general election, 2024
| Party | Candidate | Votes | % |
|---|---|---|---|
| Republican | Josh Kassmier | 9,676 | 98% |
| Total votes | | 9,676 | 98% |

=== District 15 ===
Montana Senate 15th district general election, 2024
| Party | Candidate | Votes | % |
|---|---|---|---|
| Republican | Gregg Hunter | 9,311 | 100% |
| Total votes | | 9,311 | 100% |

=== District 16 ===
Montana Senate 16th district general election, 2024
| Party | Candidate | Votes | % |
|---|---|---|---|
| Democratic | Jonathan Windy Boy | 4,554 | 61% |
| Republican | Perri Jacobs | 2,902 | 39% |
| Total votes | | 7,456 | 100% |

=== District 17 ===
Montana Senate 17th district general election, 2024
| Party | Candidate | Votes | % |
|---|---|---|---|
| Republican | Bob Phalen | 10,096 | 100% |
| Total votes | | 10,096 | 100% |

=== District 20 ===
Montana Senate 20th district general election, 2024
| Party | Candidate | Votes | % |
|---|---|---|---|
| Republican | Sue Vinton | 6,820 | 70% |
| Democratic | Linda Auch | 2,841 | 29% |
| Total votes | | 9,661 | 100% |

=== District 21 ===
Montana Senate 21st district general election, 2024
| Party | Candidate | Votes | % |
|---|---|---|---|
| Republican | Gayle Lammers | 3,796 | 57% |
| Democratic | Sharon Peregoy | 2,885 | 43% |
| Total votes | | 6,681 | 100% |

=== District 24 ===
Montana Senate 24th district general election, 2024
| Party | Candidate | Votes | % |
|---|---|---|---|
| Republican | Mike Yakawich | 4,283 | 54% |
| Democratic | Mark Nicholson | 3,675 | 46% |
| Total votes | | 7,958 | 100% |
| Republican gain from Democratic | | | |

=== District 26 ===
Montana Senate 26th district general election, 2024
| Party | Candidate | Votes | % |
|---|---|---|---|
| Republican | Tom McGillvray | 7,696 | 64% |
| Democratic | Karen Lyncoln | 4,347 | 36% |
| Total votes | | 12,043 | 100% |

=== District 27 ===
Montana Senate 27th district general election, 2024
| Party | Candidate | Votes | % |
|---|---|---|---|
| Republican | Vince Ricci | 8,446 | 74% |
| Democratic | Kathleen Gilluly | 2,942 | 26% |
| Total votes | | 11,388 | 100% |

=== District 30 ===
Incumbent Republican John Esp had represented the 30th district since 2019.

Montana Senate 30th district general election, 2024
| Party | Candidate | Votes | % |
|---|---|---|---|
| Democratic | Cora Neumann | 8,221 | 58% |
| Republican | Tyler Rogers | 5,853 | 42% |
| Total votes | | 14,074 | 100% |
| Democratic gain from Republican | | | |

=== District 33 ===
Montana Senate 33rd district general election, 2024
| Party | Candidate | Votes | % |
|---|---|---|---|
| Democratic | Christopher Pope | 7,534 | 57% |
| Republican | Neal Ganser | 5,772 | 43% |
| Total votes | | 13,306 | 100% |

=== District 35 ===
Montana Senate 35th district general election, 2024
| Party | Candidate | Votes | % |
|---|---|---|---|
| Republican | Tony Tezak | 11,666 | 100% |
| Total votes | | 11,666 | 100% |

=== District 36 ===
Montana Senate 36th district general election, 2024
| Party | Candidate | Votes | % |
|---|---|---|---|
| Democratic | Sara Novak | 6,549 | 62% |
| Republican | Darlean Newman | 3,948 | 38% |
| Total votes | | 10,497 | 100% |
| Democratic gain from Republican | | | |

=== District 37 ===
Montana Senate 37th district general election, 2024
| Party | Candidate | Votes | % |
|---|---|---|---|
| Democratic | Derek J. Harvey | 6,291 | 60% |
| Republican | Jim Kephart | 4,226 | 40% |
| Total votes | | 10,517 | 100% |

=== District 38 ===
Montana Senate 38th district general election, 2024
| Party | Candidate | Votes | % |
|---|---|---|---|
| Republican | Becky Beard | 10,056 | 72% |
| Democratic | Jeffrey Benson | 3,819 | 28% |
| Total votes | | 13,875 | 100% |

=== District 39 ===
Montana Senate 39th district general election, 2024
| Party | Candidate | Votes | % |
|---|---|---|---|
| Republican | Wylie Galt | 10,302 | 78% |
| Democratic | Bruce Shultz | 2,896 | 22% |
| Total votes | | 13,198 | 100% |

=== District 40 ===
Montana Senate 40th district general election, 2024
| Party | Candidate | Votes | % |
|---|---|---|---|
| Democratic | Laura Smith | 6,633 | 54% |
| Republican | Greg Guthrie | 5,713 | 46% |
| Total votes | | 12,346 | 100% |
| Democratic gain from Republican | | | |

=== District 44 ===
Montana Senate 44th district general election, 2024
| Party | Candidate | Votes | % |
|---|---|---|---|
| Republican | Theresa Manzella | 10,349 | 71% |
| Democratic | Cade Scatolini | 4,054 | 28% |
| Total votes | | 14,403 | 100% |

=== District 45 ===
Montana Senate 45th district general election, 2024
| Party | Candidate | Votes | % |
|---|---|---|---|
| Republican | Denley Loge | 7,714 | 59% |
| Democratic | Devin Jackson | 4,321 | 33% |
| Independent | Kelley Durbin-Williams | 1,029 | 8% |
| Total votes | | 13,064 | 100% |
| Republican gain from Democratic | | | |

=== District 46 ===
Montana Senate 46th district general election, 2024
| Party | Candidate | Votes | % |
|---|---|---|---|
| Democratic | Jacinda Morigeau | 7,328 | 58% |
| Republican | Charles Headley | 5,252 | 42% |
| Total votes | | 12,580 | 100% |

=== District 47 ===
Montana Senate 47th district general election, 2024
| Party | Candidate | Votes | % |
|---|---|---|---|
| Democratic | Ellie Boldman | 7,858 | 59% |
| Republican | Abigail Maki | 5,486 | 41% |
| Total votes | | 13,344 | 100% |
| Democratic gain from Republican | | | |

== See also ==
- List of Montana state legislatures
