= Montana Republican Party =

Montana affiliate of the Republican Party

- Chairperson: Art Wittich
- House Majority Leader: Steve Fitzpatrick
- Senate Majority Leader: Tom McGillvray
- Headquarters: Helena, Montana
- Ideology: Conservatism
- National affiliation: Republican Party
- Colors: Red
- Seats in the U.S. Senate: 2 / 2
- Seats in the U.S. House: 2 / 2
- Seats in the Montana Senate: 32 / 50
- Seats in the Montana House: 58 / 100
- Statewide Executive Offices: 6 / 6

Election symbol

Website
- mtgop.org

The Montana Republican Party (MTGOP) is the affiliate of the Republican Party in Montana. It is headquartered in Helena. It is the dominant ruling party of the state.

The party is chaired by Art Wittich. Republican officials control both of Montana's U.S. House seats, both of its U.S. Senate seats, both chambers of the state legislature, and all of the statewide executive offices, including the governorship.

== Current party officers ==
Office	Name
Chair	Art Wittich
Vice chair	Stacy Zinn
Secretary	Lola Sheldon-Galloway
Treasurer	Bill Lussenheide
National committeeman	Tanner Smith
National committeewoman	Debbie Churchill

== Current elected officials ==
The Montana Republican party controls all the six statewide offices and holds majorities in the Montana House of Representatives and Senate. They also hold both U.S. Senate seats and both congressional districts.

=== Members of Congress ===
==== U.S. Senate ====
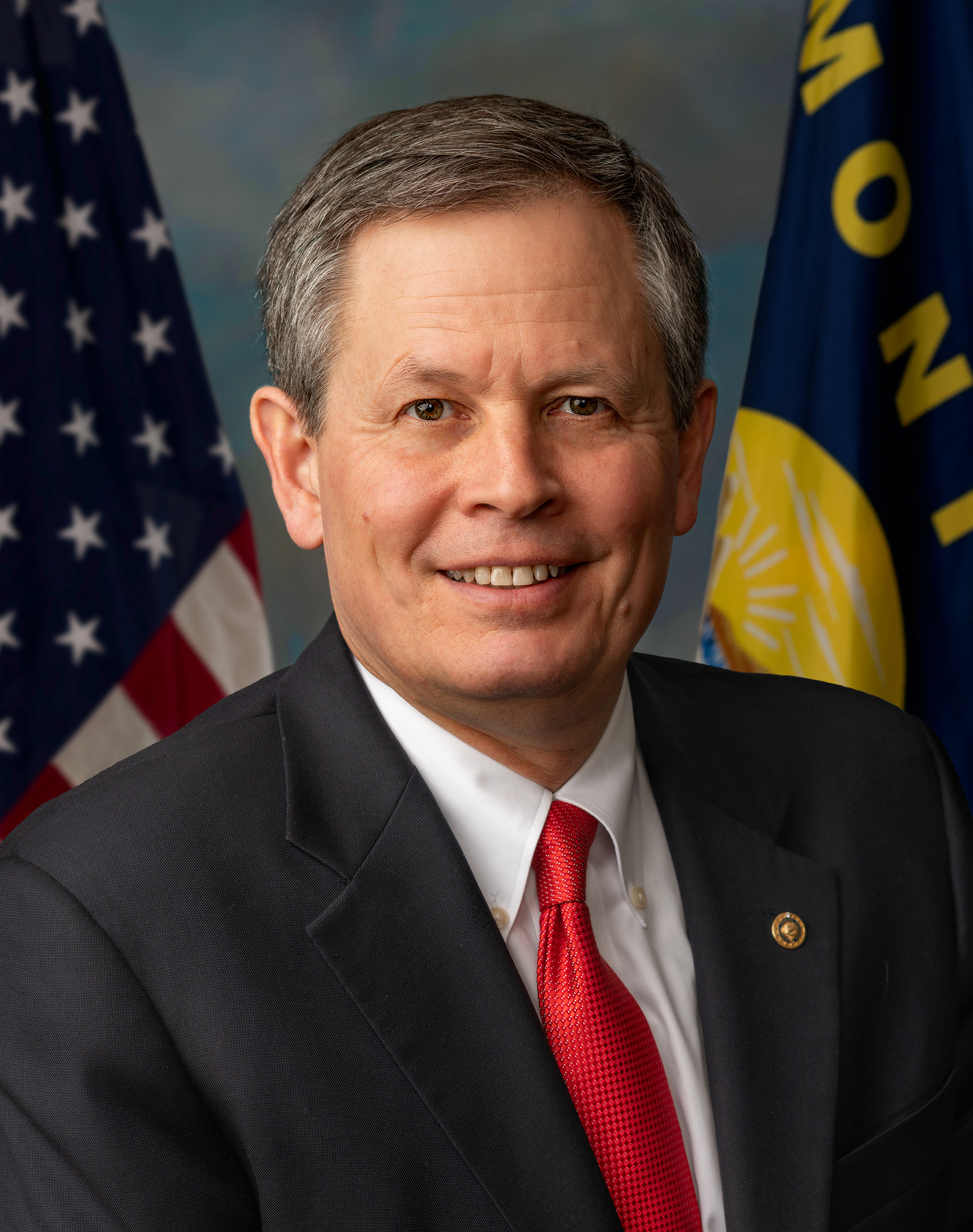
Senior U.S. Senator Steve Daines

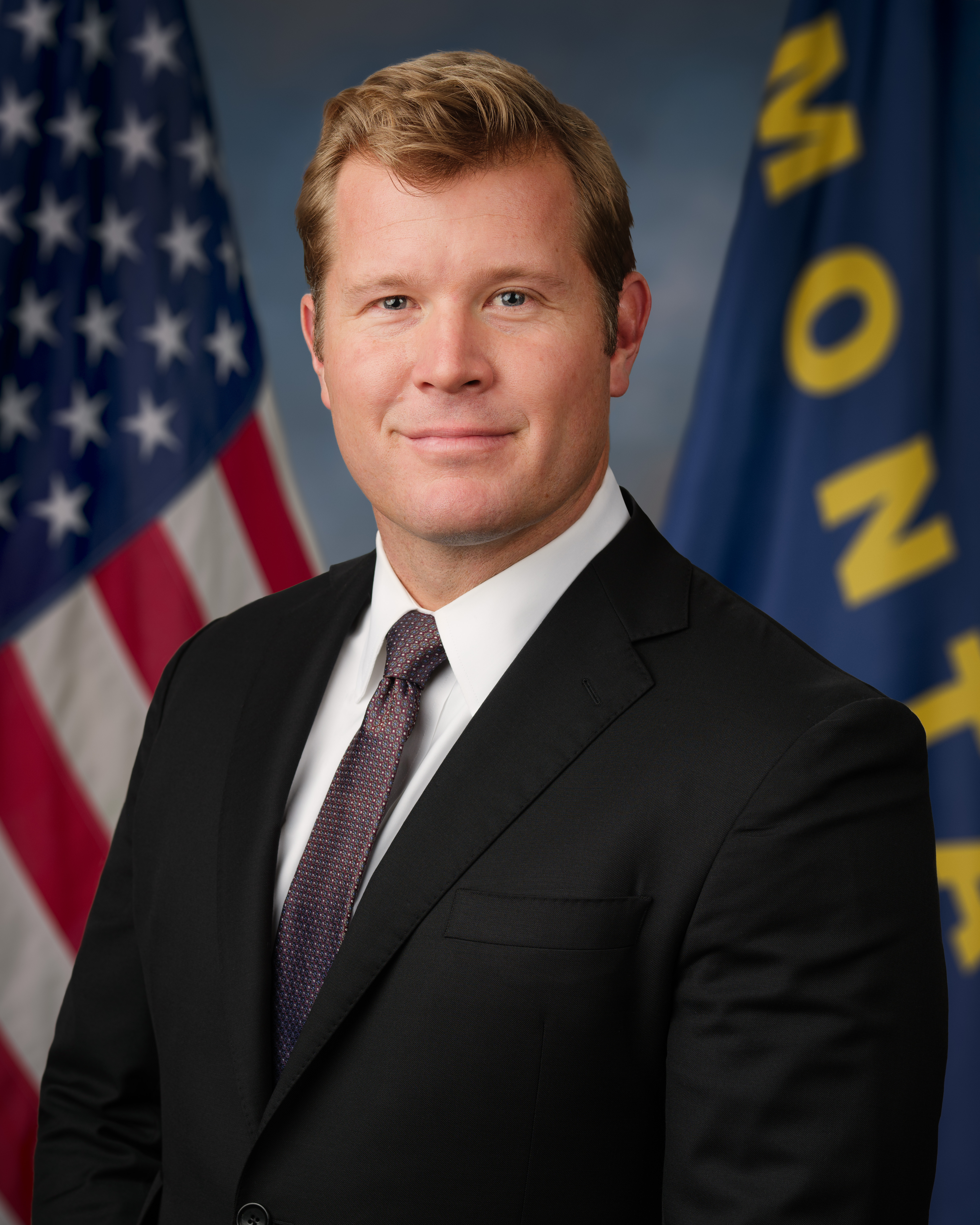
Junior (Pre-senior) U.S. Senator Tim Sheehy

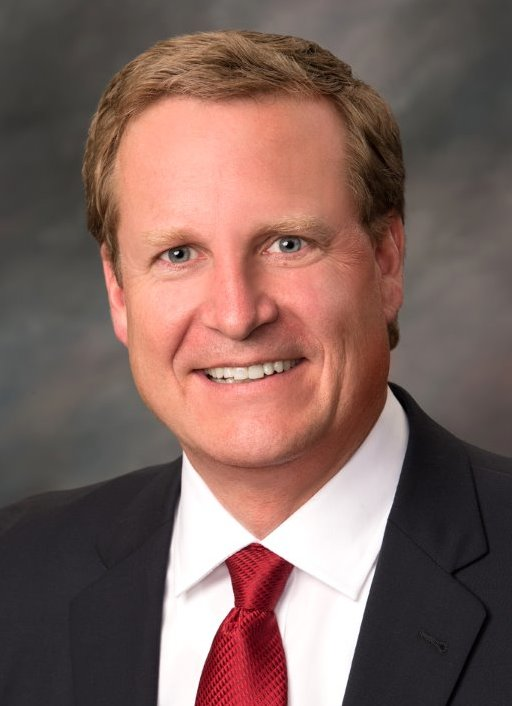
Pre-junior U.S. Senator-elect Kurt Alme

==== U.S. House of Representatives ====
District	Member	Photo
1st	Ryan Zinke	
2nd	Troy Downing	

=== Statewide offices ===
Office	Officeholder
Governor	Greg Gianforte
Lieutenant Governor	Kristen Juras
Supt. of Public Instruction	Susie Hedalen
Attorney General	Austin Knudsen
State Auditor	James Brown
Secretary of State	Christi Jacobsen

=== Legislative leaders ===
Office	Representative
President of the Senate	Matt Regier
Senate Majority Leader	Tom McGillvray
Speaker of the House	Brandon Ler
House Majority Leader	Steve Fitzpatrick

=== 32 Members of the Montana Senate ===
District	Senator	Residence
1	Mike Cuffe	Eureka
3	Keith Regier	Kalispell
4	Mark Blasdel	Kalispell
5	Bob Keenan	Bigfork
6	Greg Hertz	Polson
7	Bob Brown	Thompson Falls
9	Bruce Gillespie	Ethridge
10	Jeremy Trebas	Great Falls
11	Daniel Emrich	Great Falls
12	Wendy McKamey	Great Falls
13	Joshua Kassmier	Fort Benton
14	Russel Tempel	Chester
15	Dan Bartel	Lewistown
17	Mike Lang	Malta
18	Steve Hinebauch	Wibaux
19	Kenneth Bogner	Miles City
20	Duane Ankney	Colstrip
21	Jason Small	Busby
22	Douglas Kary	Billings
23	Chris Friedel	Billings
24	Mike Yakawich	Billings
26	Tom McGillvray	Billings
27	Vince Ricci	Billings
28	Brad Molnar	Laurel
29	David Howard	Park City
30	John Esp	Big Timber
34	Gordon Vance	Bozeman
35	Walt Sales	Manhattan
36	Jeffrey Welborn	Dillon
40	Terry Gauthier	Helena
43	Jason Ellsworth	Hamilton
44	Theresa Manzella	Hamilton
47	Daniel Salomon	Ronan

=== 58 Members of the Montana House of Representatives ===
District	Representative	Residence
1	Steve Gunderson	Libby
2	Neil Duram	Eureka
4	Lyn Bennett	Kalispell
6	Amy Regier	Kalispell
7	Frank Garner	Kalispell
8	John Fuller	Kalispell
9	Brian Putnam	Kalispell
10	Mark Noland	Bigfork
11	Derek Skees	Kalispell
12	Linda Reksten	Polson
13	Paul Fielder	Thompson Falls
14	Denley Loge	St. Regis
17	Ross Fitzgerald	Fairfield
18	Llew Jones	Conrad
20	Fred Anderson	Great Falls
21	Edward Buttrey	Great Falls
22	Lola Sheldon-Galloway	Great Falls
23	Scot Kerns	Great Falls
24	Steve Fitzpatrick	Great Falls
25	Steve Gist	Cascade
26	Jeremy Trebas	Great Falls
28	Eric Albus	Glasgow
29	Dan Bartel	Lewistown
30	Wylie Galt	Martinsdale
33	Casey Knudsen	Malta
34	Rhonda Knudsen	Culbertson
35	Brandon Ler	Savage
36	Bob Phalen	Lindsay
37	Jerry Schillinger	Circle
38	Kenneth Holmlund	Miles City
39	Geraldine Custer	Forsyth
40	Mike Vinton	Billings
43	Kerri Seekins-Crowe	Billings
44	Larry Brewster	Billings
48	Curtis Schomer	Billings
49	Sherry Essmann	Billings
50	Naarah Hastings	Billings
51	Jodee Etchart	Billings
52	Bill Mercer	Billings
53	Dennis Lenz	Billings
54	Lee Deming	Helena
55	Brad Barker	Luther
56	Fiona Nave	Billings
67	Jedediah Hinkle	Bozeman
68	Caleb Hinkle	Belgrade
69	Jennifer Carlson	Manhattan
70	Julie Dooling	Helena
75	Marta Bertoglio	Clancy
76	John Fitzpatrick	Anaconda
77	Jane Gillette	Three Forks
78	Randynn Gregg	White Sulphur Springs
84	Julie Dooling	Helena
85	Michele Binkley	Hamilton
86	David Bedey	Hamilton
87	Ron Marshall	Hamilton
88	Sharon Greef	Florence

== Platform ==
The Montana Republican Party's most recent platform was adopted June 29, 2024 and can be viewed in its entirety on the Montana Republican Party's official website.

== Conventions ==
Party conventions are held regularly in the state, per party bylaws. The State Platform convention, which meets once every even-numbered year between the primary and general elections, is used to adopt a state platform. There is a State Delegate Convention, which meets every presidential year prior to the Republican National Committee; during this convention, delegates and alternate delegates are elected to the Republican National Convention. The State Officer's Convention, which meets in June each odd-numbered year, is used to elect party leadership, including Chairman, Vice Chairman, Secretary, and Treasurer. The party provides notice for meetings and conventions. The Parliamentary practice is Roberts' Rules of Order, which governs all conventions and meetings and allows the state chairman to appoint a parliamentarian for any State Central Committee meeting or convention.

=== Committees ===
The State Central Committee is made up by the county chairman, state committeemen and committee women, and finance chairman for each county. This committee is the governing body the MTGOP and makes up all the rules and policies for the state party.

The State Executive Board is made up of the state chairman, vice chairman, secretary, treasurer, finance chair, the national committeeman and committeewoman, and five regional chairs, who are elected by county chairmen. The main purpose of this committee is to execute the policies and programs of the MTGOP between meetings of the State Central Committee. The terms of these members last as long as the chairman's term and can also end by resignation.

County Central Committees are found in each county in Montana and consist of elected or appointed committeemen and committeewomen from each precinct of the county, who hold office for two years. The committee elects county chairman and vice chairman, secretary and treasurer, state and Congressional committeeman and committee woman, finance chairman, and anything else that seems important. It can adopt its own rules and come up with a county executive committee that executes the counties rules and policies.

There are also other committees such as the Rules Committee, for which members are appointed by the chairman to consider or recommend rules and rule changes. Any other special committee such as the Rules Committee can be appointed by the chairman if needed.

=== Elected officers ===
The chairman is the leader of the party and is responsible of the hiring and firing of any employees. The chairman can appoint all committees except the executive committee. The chairman has the power of supervision and management. The chairman also works with the treasurer to make sure the right resources are provided. Vice chairman performs all the duties assigned by the chairman. Secretary keeps the minutes for all meetings and anything assigned by the chairman. Treasurer controls the financial record keeping and practices of the party. Assistant treasurer is there to become familiar with the responsibilities of the treasurer and will perform any duties assigned by the chairman and treasurer.

=== Appointed officers ===
Executive director is appointed by the chairman after approval from the executive committee. The main duty is to preserve all permanent records of the State Central Committee and any other duty assigned by the chairman. finance chairman is appointed exactly like the executive director. The main duty of this officer is to raise funds for the Republican Party.

General Counsel is also appointed the same way as the first two officers. The main duty of the General Counsel is to advise the chairman, State Central Committee, and all other officers and committees on all legal matters. The General Counsel is licensed to practice law within the state.

There can be other types of officers that are appointed by the chairman. These types are only appointed if needed for a particular purpose.

=== Nominations ===
The State Central Committee will appoint a nominee to fill a vacancy for a party candidate and the person who receives the most votes is the nominee. If one or two Congressional Districts for the state need to be filled, a committee appointed by the County Central Committee will make the appointment and the person with the most votes wins the nomination. The votes entitled to the certain members shall be weighted by comparing the Republican primary vote in each county and the Republican primary vote for the office being voted for. For each two percent or less of the total vote, there are four votes awarded to the county. Anything higher than two percent will be awarded an extra vote. The delegates at the meetings will divide the votes to each county and then the delegates will individually cast their votes.

== Voting trends ==

Montana is considered to be a moderately Republican state. There is a small percentage of Hispanic and African American votes. There is a significant number of votes from the Native American population as well. Montana has voted Republican in almost every single presidential election after the national Democratic landslide of 1964, with the sole exception of Bill Clinton's narrow plurality victory in 1992. Republican presidential candidate Donald Trump won Montana in 2020 with 56.9% of the total statewide vote over Democrat Joe Biden, who received 40.5%.

During the 2022 midterms, the Republicans gained super-majority status in the state legislature, capturing 34 of 50 senate seats and 68 of 100 house seats.

== Historical figures ==
=== Benjamin Potts ===
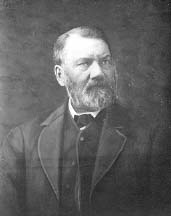
Benjamin F Potts

Potts was a Republican governor of Montana Territory who worked with Democrat political and business leaders to sustain a successful program of financial responsibility and economy of government during a boom period in Montana's territorial era. He was the longest-serving territorial governor in U.S. history.

=== Wilbur F. Sanders ===
Sanders was a lawyer, Civil War veteran that was considered to be known as the essence of Montana Republicanism.

=== Jeannette Rankin ===
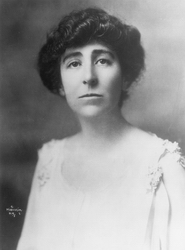
Jeannette Rankin

Rankin was a Republican from Montana and was also an important figure with the women's suffrage movement. Her efforts were rewarded when Montana gave women the right to vote in 1914. In 1916 she was the first woman to be elected to Congress. During her term in Congress she voted against U.S. entry in World War I. She left Congress in 1919 but was reelected in 1940. Once again she voted for peace and opposed U.S. entry in World War II.

== Election results ==
=== Presidential ===
Montana Republican Party presidential election results
Election	Presidential ticket	Votes	Vote %	Electoral votes	Result
1892	Benjamin Harrison/Whitelaw Reid	18,871	42.44%	3 / 3	Lost
1896	William McKinley/Garret Hobart	10,509	19.71%	0 / 3	Won
1900	William McKinley/Theodore Roosevelt	25,409	39.79%	0 / 3	Won
1904	Theodore Roosevelt/Charles W. Fairbanks	34,932	54.21%	3 / 3	Won
1908	William Howard Taft/James S. Sherman	32,333	46.98%	3 / 3	Won
1912	William Howard Taft/Nicholas M. Butler	18,512	23.19%	0 / 4	Lost
1916	Charles E. Hughes/Charles W. Fairbanks	66,750	37.57%	0 / 4	Lost
1920	Warren G. Harding/Calvin Coolidge	109,430	61.13%	4 / 4	Won
1924	Calvin Coolidge/Charles G. Dawes	74,138	42.50%	4 / 4	Won
1928	Herbert Hoover/Charles Curtis	113,300	58.37%	4 / 4	Won
1932	Herbert Hoover/Charles Curtis	78,078	36.07%	0 / 4	Lost
1936	Alf Landon/Frank Knox	63,598	27.59%	0 / 4	Lost
1940	Wendell Willkie/Charles L. McNary	99,579	40.17%	0 / 4	Lost
1944	Thomas E. Dewey/John W. Bricker	93,163	44.93%	0 / 4	Lost
1948	Thomas E. Dewey/Earl Warren	96,770	43.15%	0 / 4	Lost
1952	Dwight D. Eisenhower/Richard Nixon	157,394	59.39%	4 / 4	Won
1956	Dwight D. Eisenhower/Richard Nixon	154,933	57.13%	4 / 4	Won
1960	Richard Nixon/Henry Cabot Lodge Jr.	141,841	51.10%	4 / 4	Lost
1964	Barry Goldwater/William E. Miller	113,032	40.57%	0 / 4	Lost
1968	Richard Nixon/Spiro Agnew	138,835	50.60%	4 / 4	Won
1972	Richard Nixon/Spiro Agnew	183,976	57.93%	4 / 4	Won
1976	Gerald Ford/Bob Dole	173,703	52.84%	4 / 4	Lost
1980	Ronald Reagan/George H. W. Bush	206,814	56.82%	4 / 4	Won
1984	Ronald Reagan/George H. W. Bush	232,450	60.47%	4 / 4	Won
1988	George H. W. Bush/Dan Quayle	190,412	52.07%	4 / 4	Won
1992	George H. W. Bush/Dan Quayle	144,207	35.12%	0 / 3	Lost
1996	Bob Dole/Jack Kemp	179,652	44.11%	3 / 3	Lost
2000	George W. Bush/Dick Cheney	240,178	58.4%	3 / 3	Won
2004	George W. Bush/Dick Cheney	266,063	59.07%	3 / 3	Won
2008	John McCain/Sarah Palin	243,882	49.49%	3 / 3	Lost
2012	Mitt Romney/Paul Ryan	267,928	55.35%	3 / 3	Lost
2016	Donald Trump/Mike Pence	279,240	56.17%	3 / 3	Won
2020	Donald Trump/Mike Pence	343,602	56.92%	3 / 3	Lost
2024	Donald Trump/JD Vance	352,079	58.39%	4 / 4	Won

=== Gubernatorial ===
Montana Republican Party gubernatorial election results
Election	Gubernatorial candidate/ticket	Votes	Vote %	Result
1889	Thomas C. Power	18,991	49.04%	Lost ✗
1892	John E. Rickards	18,187	41.17%	Won ✓
1896	Alexander C. Botkin	14,993	29.01%	Lost ✗
1900	David S. Folsom	22,691	35.56%	Lost ✗
1904	William Lindsay	26,957	40.99%	Lost ✗
1908	Edward Donlan	30,792	45.16%	Lost ✗
1912	Harry L. Wilson	22,950	28.77%	Lost ✗
1916	Frank J. Edwards	76,547	44.10%	Lost ✗
1920	Joseph M. Dixon	111,113	59.74%	Won ✓
1924	Joseph M. Dixon	74,126	42.59%	Lost ✗
1928	Wellington D. Rankin	79,777	41.08%	Lost ✗
1932	Frank A. Hazelbaker	101,105	46.73%	Lost ✗
1936	Frank A. Hazelbaker	108,914	48.12%	Lost ✗
1940	Sam C. Ford	124,435	50.67%	Won ✓
1944	Sam C. Ford	116,461	56.36%	Won ✓
1948	Sam C. Ford	97,792	43.86%	Lost ✗
1952	J. Hugo Aronson	134,423	50.96%	Won ✓
1956	J. Hugo Aronson	138,878	51.37%	Won ✓
1960	Donald Grant Nutter	154,230	55.11%	Won ✓
1964	Tim Babcock	144,113	51.29%	Won ✓
1968	Tim Babcock	116,432	41.87%	Lost ✗
1972	Ed Smith	146,231	45.88%	Lost ✗
1976	Bob Woodahl/Antoinette Fraser Rosell	115,848	36.58%	Lost ✗
1980	Jack Ramirez/Walt Johnson	160,892	44.63%	Lost ✗
1984	Pat M. Goodover/Don Allen	100,070	26.41%	Lost ✗
1988	Stan Stephens/Allen Kolstad	190,604	51.93%	Won ✓
1992	Marc Racicot/Denny Rehberg	209,401	51.35%	Won ✓
1996	Marc Racicot/Judy Martz	320,768	79.17%	Won ✓
2000	Judy Martz/Karl Ohs	209,135	50.98%	Won ✓
2004	Bob Brown/Dave Lewis	205,313	46.02%	Lost ✗
2008	Roy Brown/Steve Daines	158,268	32.52%	Lost ✗
2012	Rick Hill/Jon Sonju	228,879	47.34%	Lost ✗
2016	Greg Gianforte/Lesley Robinson	236,115	46.35%	Lost ✗
2020	Greg Gianforte/Kristen Juras	328,548	54.43%	Won ✓
2024	Greg Gianforte/Kristen Juras	354,569	58.86%	Won ✓

== See also ==
- Political party strength in Montana
- United States presidential election in Montana, 2008
- Montana Democratic Party
- Montana Libertarian Party
- Republican Party of Alberta
