= Derek J. Harvey =

American politician

Member of the Montana House of Representatives from the 74th district
- In office January 7, 2019 – January 6, 2025
- Preceded by: Pat Noonan

Member of the Montana Senate from the 37th district
- Incumbent
- Assumed office January 6, 2025
- Preceded by: Ryan Lynch

Personal details
- Party: Democratic
- Education: Missoula College University of Montana (AAS)

Derek J. Harvey is an American politician in the Montana Senate. He previously served as a member of the Montana House of Representatives from the 74th district.

== Education ==
Harvery earned an associate of applied sciences degree in fire science from Missoula College University of Montana.

== Career ==
Harvey was elected to the Montana House of Representatives in November 2018 and assumed office on January 7, 2019.

In the 2024 Montana Senate election, he was elected in District 37.
