= 2016 Montana House of Representatives election =

- November 8, 2016

All 100 seats of the Montana House of Representatives 51 seats needed for a majority
- Registered: 694,370 ▲2.98%
- Turnout: 74.44% ▲19.00%
	Majority party	Minority party
Leader	Austin Knudsen	Jenny Eck
Party	Republican	Democratic
Leader's seat	34th district	79th district
Last election	59	41
Seats won	59	41
Seat change	Steady	Steady
Popular vote	258,412	205,981
Percentage	55.18%	43.99%
Swing	▲1.56%	▼1.13%
- Results: Republican gain Democratic gain Republican hold Democratic hold
Speaker before election
Austin Knudsen
Republican
Elected Speaker
Austin Knudsen
Republican

An election was held on November 8, 2016 to elect all 100 members to Montana's House of Representatives. The election coincided with elections for other offices, including U.S. president, U.S. House of Representatives, governor, and state senate. The primary election was held on June 7, 2016.

There was no change in the composition of the House, with the Republicans winning 59 seats and the Democrats 41 seats.

== Predictions ==
Source	Ranking	As of
Governing	Safe R	October 12, 2016

== Results ==
=== Statewide ===
Statewide results of the 2016 Montana House of Representatives election:

Party	Candi- dates	Votes			Seats		
Party	Candi- dates	No.	%	+/–	No.	+/–	%
Republican Party	84	258,412	55.18%	▲1.56%	59	Steady	59.00%
Democratic Party	94	205,981	43.99%	▼1.13%	41	Steady	41.00%
Independent	2	2,019	0.43%	▼0.43%	0	Steady	0.00%
Libertarian Party	5	1,861	0.40%	▲0.22%	0	Steady	0.00%
Total	185	468,273	100.00%	Steady	100	Steady	100.00%

=== District ===
Results of the 2016 Montana House of Representatives election by district:

District	Democratic		Republican		Others		Total votes	Result
District	Votes	%	Votes	%	Votes	%	Total votes	Result
1st district	1,155	27.50%	3,045	72.50%	—	—	4,200	Republican hold
2nd district	1,035	21.28%	3,829	78.72%	—	—	4,864	Republican hold
3rd district	2,474	52.90%	2,203	47.10%	—	—	4,677	Democratic hold
4th district	1,170	22.83%	3,955	77.17%	—	—	5,125	Republican hold
5th district	3,257	56.74%	2,483	43.26%	—	—	5,740	Democratic hold
6th district	1,612	28.31%	3,770	66.20%	313	5.50%	5,695	Republican hold
7th district	1,392	34.83%	2,604	65.17%	—	—	3,996	Republican hold
8th district	1,115	23.33%	3,665	76.67%	—	—	4,780	Republican hold
9th district	1,052	27.28%	2,804	72.72%	—	—	3,856	Republican hold
10th district	—	—	4,102	73.02%	1,516	26.98%	5,618	Republican hold
11th district	1,305	25.81%	3,752	74.19%	—	—	5,057	Republican hold
12th district	1,883	35.62%	3,403	64.38%	—	—	5,286	Republican hold
13th district	1,293	24.70%	3,942	75.30%	—	—	5,235	Republican hold
14th district	1,054	22.26%	3,681	77.74%	—	—	4,735	Republican hold
15th district	2,453	100.00%	—	—	—	—	2,453	Democratic hold
16th district	2,983	100.00%	—	—	—	—	2,983	Democratic hold
17th district	1,275	25.63%	3,700	74.37%	—	—	4,975	Republican hold
18th district	—	—	3,670	100.00%	—	—	3,670	Republican hold
19th district	1,243	27.19%	3,328	72.81%	—	—	4,571	Republican hold
20th district	1,625	28.97%	3,985	71.03%	—	—	5,610	Republican hold
21st district	3,448	100.00%	—	—	—	—	3,448	Democratic hold
22nd district	1,801	46.17%	2,100	53.83%	—	—	3,901	Republican gain
23rd district	1,817	50.83%	1,758	49.17%	—	—	3,575	Democratic gain
24th district	2,292	58.51%	1,625	41.49%	—	—	3,917	Democratic hold
25th district	1,861	48.56%	1,971	51.44%	—	—	3,832	Republican gain
26th district	1,375	50.78%	1,333	49.22%	—	—	2,708	Democratic hold
27th district	1,406	28.27%	3,568	71.73%	—	—	4,974	Republican hold
28th district	2,231	53.45%	1,943	46.55%	—	—	4,174	Democratic gain
29th district	994	19.78%	4,032	80.22%	—	—	5,026	Republican hold
30th district	1,274	24.76%	3,871	75.24%	—	—	5,145	Republican hold
31st district	2,608	100.00%	—	—	—	—	2,608	Democratic hold
32nd district	2,499	100.00%	—	—	—	—	2,499	Democratic gain
33rd district	1,058	22.90%	3,562	77.10%	—	—	4,620	Republican hold
34th district	1,243	22.51%	4,278	77.49%	—	—	5,521	Republican hold
35th district	882	18.74%	3,825	81.26%	—	—	4,707	Republican hold
36th district	1,177	23.99%	3,730	76.01%	—	—	4,907	Republican hold
37th district	834	14.72%	4,831	85.28%	—	—	5,665	Republican hold
38th district	1,916	45.94%	2,255	54.06%	—	—	4,171	Republican hold
39th district	922	19.09%	3,908	80.91%	—	—	4,830	Republican hold
40th district	1,654	33.60%	3,269	66.40%	—	—	4,923	Republican hold
41st district	2,054	100.00%	—	—	—	—	2,054	Democratic hold
42nd district	2,496	100.00%	—	—	—	—	2,496	Democratic hold
43rd district	1,523	35.05%	2,488	57.26%	334	7.69%	4,345	Republican hold
44th district	1,606	37.11%	2,722	62.89%	—	—	4,328	Republican hold
45th district	1,453	30.54%	3,305	69.46%	—	—	4,758	Republican hold
46th district	1,939	35.31%	3,553	64.69%	—	—	5,492	Republican hold
47th district	2,272	58.51%	1,611	41.49%	—	—	3,883	Democratic hold
48th district	2,551	55.12%	2,077	44.88%	—	—	4,628	Democratic hold
49th district	1,856	56.72%	1,416	43.28%	—	—	3,272	Democratic hold
50th district	2,117	55.29%	1,712	44.71%	—	—	3,829	Democratic hold
51st district	1,759	46.19%	2,049	53.81%	—	—	3,808	Republican gain
52nd district	1,801	47.95%	1,955	52.05%	—	—	3,756	Republican hold
53rd district	1,543	22.83%	5,216	77.17%	—	—	6,759	Republican hold
54th district	—	—	4,335	100.00%	—	—	4,335	Republican hold
55th district	1,149	25.33%	3,387	74.67%	—	—	4,536	Republican hold
56th district	1,247	29.78%	2,940	70.22%	—	—	4,187	Republican hold
57th district	—	—	4,247	85.03%	748	14.97%	4,995	Republican hold
58th district	2,180	36.79%	3,746	63.21%	—	—	5,926	Republican hold
59th district	1,735	29.11%	4,225	70.89%	—	—	5,960	Republican hold
60th district	2,858	52.30%	2,607	47.70%	—	—	5,465	Democratic gain
61st district	3,787	55.06%	2,804	40.77%	287	4.17%	6,878	Democratic hold
62nd district	5,251	100.00%	—	—	—	—	5,251	Democratic hold
63rd district	2,885	59.56%	1,959	40.44%	—	—	4,844	Democratic hold
64th district	2,510	39.32%	3,873	60.68%	—	—	6,383	Republican hold
65th district	3,093	49.55%	3,149	50.45%	—	—	6,242	Republican gain
66th district	4,425	100.00%	—	—	—	—	4,425	Democratic hold
67th district	1,491	31.19%	3,290	68.81%	—	—	4,781	Republican hold
68th district	1,275	25.63%	3,700	74.37%	—	—	4,975	Republican hold
69th district	1,291	23.23%	4,266	76.77%	—	—	5,557	Republican hold
70th district	1,793	30.75%	4,038	69.25%	—	—	5,831	Republican hold
71st district	—	—	5,088	100.00%	—	—	5,088	Republican hold
72nd district	1,002	18.79%	4,331	81.21%	—	—	5,333	Republican hold
73rd district	3,950	100.00%	—	—	—	—	3,950	Democratic hold
74th district	3,461	100.00%	—	—	—	—	3,461	Democratic hold
75th district	2,390	41.36%	3,389	58.64%	—	—	5,779	Republican hold
76th district	4,798	100.00%	—	—	—	—	4,798	Democratic hold
77th district	2,977	57.35%	2,214	42.65%	—	—	5,191	Democratic hold
78th district	2,153	59.94%	1,439	40.06%	—	—	3,592	Democratic hold
79th district	4,358	100.00%	—	—	—	—	4,358	Democratic hold
80th district	1,161	20.35%	4,040	70.83%	503	8.82%	5,704	Republican hold
81st district	3,933	100.00%	—	—	—	—	3,933	Democratic hold
82nd district	4,013	100.00%	—	—	—	—	4,013	Democratic hold
83rd district	2,573	54.54%	2,145	45.46%	—	—	4,718	Democratic hold
84th district	2,462	49.40%	2,343	47.01%	179	3.59%	4,984	Democratic hold
85th district	1,593	26.94%	4,321	73.06%	—	—	5,914	Republican hold
86th district	1,889	34.52%	3,583	65.48%	—	—	5,472	Republican hold
87th district	—	—	4,487	100.00%	—	—	4,487	Republican hold
88th district	1,818	33.32%	3,639	66.68%	—	—	5,457	Republican hold
89th district	2,801	59.32%	1,921	40.68%	—	—	4,722	Democratic hold
90th district	3,113	60.72%	2,014	39.28%	—	—	5,127	Democratic hold
91st district	5,142	100.00%	—	—	—	—	5,142	Democratic hold
92nd district	2,416	49.01%	2,514	50.99%	—	—	4,930	Republican hold
93rd district	2,392	54.33%	2,011	45.67%	—	—	4,403	Democratic gain
94th district	2,703	54.50%	2,257	45.50%	—	—	4,960	Democratic hold
95th district	3,178	74.03%	1,115	25.97%	—	—	4,293	Democratic hold
96th district	2,532	47.99%	2,744	52.01%	—	—	5,276	Republican gain
97th district	2,096	40.32%	3,103	59.68%	—	—	5,199	Republican hold
98th district	2,989	59.65%	2,022	40.35%	—	—	5,011	Democratic hold
99th district	3,101	59.69%	2,094	40.31%	—	—	5,195	Democratic hold
100th district	4,379	79.23%	1,148	20.77%	—	—	5,527	Democratic hold
Total	205,981	43.99%	258,412	55.18%	3,880	0.83%	468,273	
