= Roger Webb (disambiguation) =

Roger Webb (1934–2002), was a British jazz pianist and composer. Roger Webb may also refer to:

- Roger Webb (politician) (fl. 2010s), American politician from Montana
- W. Roger Webb (born 1941), American university president
- Roger Webb, fictional character on Footballers' Wives
