= Senator Kean =

Senator Kean or Keane may refer to:

== Members of the United States Senate ==
- Hamilton Fish Kean (1862–1941), U.S. Senator from New Jersey from 1929 to 1935
- John Kean (New Jersey politician) (1852–1914), U.S. Senator from New Jersey from 1899 to 1911

== United States state senate members ==
- Sean T. Kean (born 1963), New Jersey State Senate
- Thomas Kean Jr. (born 1968), New Jersey State Senate
- Jim Keane (politician), Montana State Senate
- Thomas E. Keane (1905–1996), Illinois State Senate

== See also ==
- John David Keene Sr., fictional U.S. Senator from Watchmen
