= Senator Small =

Senator Small may refer to:

- Arthur A. Small (1933–2015), Iowa State Senate
- Jason Small (politician) (born 1978), Montana State Senate
- Len Small (1862–1936), Illinois State Senate
- Mary E. Small (born 1954), Maine State Senate
- William B. Small (politician) (1817–1878), New Hampshire State Senate

== See also ==
- Robert Smalls (1839–1915), South Carolina State Senate
