= Senator Kaufman (disambiguation) =

Ted Kaufman (born 1939) was a United States Senator from Delaware from 2009 to 2010. Senator Kaufman, Kaufmann, or Kauffman may also refer to:

- David S. Kaufman (1813–1851), Republic of Texas State Senate
- Claudia Kauffman (born 1959), Washington State Senate
- Christine Kaufmann (politician) (born 1951), Montana State Senate
- James D. Kaufman (born 1958), Alaska State Senate
