= Lee Randall =

American politician

Member of the Montana House of Representatives from the 37th district
- In office January 5, 2015 – January 2, 2017
- Preceded by: Scott Staffeson
- Succeeded by: Bill Harris

Member of the Montana House of Representatives from the 39th district
- In office January 5, 2009 – January 5, 2015
- Preceded by: Carol Lambert
- Succeeded by: Geraldine Custer

Personal details
- Party: Republican

Lee Randall is a former Republican member of the Montana Legislature. He was first elected to District 39 of the House of Representatives in 2008, after which he assumed that office on January 5, 2009. Randall served District 39 in the 2009, 2011, and 2013 legislative sessions until being redistricted in 2015, and represented District 37, which encompassed all of Carter, Garfield, McCone, and Prairie Counties, and parts of Fallon, Powder River and Wibaux Counties until January 2, 2017.

Randall served as Speaker Pro Tempore during the 2015-2016 session.

Montana House of Representatives
Preceded by Scott Staffanson	Member of the Montana House of Representatives from the 37th district 2015–2017	Succeeded by Bill Harris
Montana House of Representatives
Preceded by Carol Lambert	Member of the Montana House of Representatives from the 39th district 2009–2015	Succeeded by Geraldine Custer
