= Roger Koopman =

American politician

Member of Montana House of Representatives
- In office 2005–2008

Member of the Montana Public Service Commission from the 3rd district
- In office 2013–2021
- Preceded by: John Vincent
- Succeeded by: Jeffrey Welborn

Personal details
- Party: Republican
- Education: University of Idaho

Roger Koopman is an American politician. He was a member of the Montana House of Representatives from 2005 to 2008. He is president of Montana Conservative Alliance. He served two terms on the Montana Public Service Commission. He served as a congressional staffer for Steve Symms and Ron Paul.
