= Daniel Salomon =

Daniel Salomon may refer to:

- Daniel Salomon (musician) (born 1973), Israeli pop rock singer and musician
- Daniel Salomon (politician) (born 1957), Republican member of the Montana Legislature

== See also ==
- Daniel Solomon (born 1945), Canadian abstract painter
