= Jennifer Gross =

Jennifer Gross may refer to:

- Jennifer Gross (basketball) (born c. 1975), American basketball coach
- Jennifer Gross (politician), member of the Ohio House of Representatives
- Jenny Gross, a fictional character from the Australian drama series Winners & Losers

== See also ==
- Jen Gross, member of the Montana Senate
