= Jason Small =

Jason Small may refer to:

- Jason Small (racing driver)
- Jason Small (politician)
