= Lane Larson =

American politician (born 1957)

Member of the Montana Senate from the 22nd district
- In office 2004 - 2008
- Succeeded by: Taylor Brown

Personal details
- Born: May 21, 1957 (age 69) Seattle, Washington, U.S.
- Party: Democratic
- Spouse: Lynn
- Occupation: Electrician

Lane L. Larson was a Democratic member of the Montana Senate, representing District 22 from 2004 to 2008. He served as Majority Whip.
