= Fred A. Thomas =

American politician

Fred A. Thomas (May 26, 1865 – June 12, 1958) was a politician in the state of Montana.

== Biography ==
Thomas was born on May 26, 1865, in Potosi, Wisconsin, and died on June 12, 1958, in Stevensville, Montana. His grandson, also named Fred, served in the Montana State Senate.

== Career ==
Thomas served as a member of the Montana House of Representatives from 1947 to 1949. He was a Republican. Thomas publicly opposed Mike Mansfield's candidacy for the U.S. Senate in 1952, accusing Mansfield of communist sympathies.
