= Sue Vinton =

American politician from Montana

Majority Leader of the Montana House of Representatives
- In office January 4, 2021 – January 6, 2025
- Preceded by: Brad Tschida
- Succeeded by: Steve Fitzpatrick

Member of the Montana House of Representatives from the 56th district
- Incumbent
- Assumed office January 2, 2017
- Preceded by: Tom Richmond

Personal details
- Born: November 26, 1956 (age 69) Boston, Massachusetts, U.S.
- Party: Republican
- Spouse: Mike Vinton
- Children: 4
- Education: Alfred University (BS)

Sue Vinton (born November 26, 1956) is an American politician in the Montana Senate. She served in the Montana House of Representatives from the 56th district since 2017.

== Career ==
Vinton started her career as a litigation paralegal. Vinton is a business owner and a general contractor in Montana.

On November 8, 2016, Vinton won the election and became a Republican member of Montana House of Representatives for District 56. On November 6, 2018, as an incumbent, Vinton won the election and continued serving as the Montana House of Representatives for District 56. On November 3, 2020, as an incumbent, Vinton won the election and continued serving as the Montana House of Representatives for District 56.

== Personal life ==
Vinton's husband is Mike Vinton. They have four children. Vinton and her family live in Lockwood, Montana.

Montana House of Representatives
Preceded by Brad Tschida	Majority Leader of the Montana House of Representatives; 2021–2025	Succeeded by Steve Fitzpatrick
