= Ron Arthun =

American politician

Member of the Montana Senate from the 31st district
- In office 2011–2017
- Preceded by: John Esp
- Succeeded by: Mike Phillips

Personal details
- Party: Republican
- Spouse: Kayl
- Education: Montana State University
- Occupation: Rancher, businessman

Ron Arthun was a Republican member of the Montana Legislature. He was elected for Senate District 31, representing the Wilsall, Montana area, in 2010. Arthun graduated from Montana State University with an agriculture degree. Besides maintaining a ranch, Arthun performs with the Ringling 5 travelling group. He retired in 2016.
