= Dennis Lenz =

American politician

Member of the Montana Senate
- Incumbent
- Assumed office January 6, 2025
- Preceded by: Jen Gross
- Constituency: 25th
- In office January 2, 2023 – January 6, 2025
- Preceded by: Cary Smith
- Succeeded by: Vince Ricci
- Constituency: 27th

Member of the Montana House of Representatives
- In office January 2, 2017 – January 2, 2023
- Preceded by: Sarah Laszloffy
- Succeeded by: Nelly Nicol
- Constituency: 53rd
- In office January 7, 2013 – January 5, 2015
- Preceded by: Tom McGillvray
- Succeeded by: Virginia Court
- Constituency: 50th

Personal details
- Born: Dennis Robert Lenz
- Party: Republican
- Spouse: Deanna
- Children: 2

Dennis Robert Lenz is an American politician serving as a member of the Montana House of Representatives from the 53rd district. Elected in November 2016, he assumed office in January 2017. Lenz had previously served in the House from 2013 to 2015.

== Education ==
Lenz earned a certificate in pastoral ministry from the Yellowstone Valley Bible Institute and another in ranch management from Texas Christian University.

== Career ==
Since 1984, Lenz has worked as a self-employed farmer. From 1984 to 2016, he was a captain in the Billings Fire Department. Lenz was a candidate for the Montana House of Representatives in 2010, losing to incumbent Democrat Margaret MacDonald. He ran again in 2013, defeating Democratic nominee Deborah Willis. He served for one term and was defeated by Democrat Jessica Karjala in 2014. Lenz was re-elected to his old seat in 2016, defeating Jordan Matney.

== Personal life ==
Lenz and his wife, Deanna, have two children.
