= Taylor Brown (Montana politician) =

American politician

Member of the Montana Senate from the 28th district
- In office January 2009 – 2016
- Preceded by: Lane Larson
- Succeeded by: Tom Richmond

Personal details
- Born: Sand Springs, Montana, U.S.
- Party: Republican
- Spouse: Shannon Brown
- Education: Montana State University, Bozeman

William Taylor Brown was a Republican member of the Montana Legislature. He served Senate District 22, representing Huntley, Montana, since 2009. Due to redistricting he also served District 28. Brown is widely known as an on-air farm broadcaster. He was mentioned as a possible candidate for the 2012 Montana Governor's race, but did not run.
