= Cary Smith (politician) =

American politician

Majority Leader of the Montana Senate
- In office January 4, 2021 – January 2, 2023
- Preceded by: Fred Thomas
- Succeeded by: Steve Fitzpatrick

Member of the Montana Senate from the 27th district
- In office January 5, 2015 – January 2, 2023
- Preceded by: Elsie Arntzen
- Succeeded by: Dennis Lenz

Member of the Montana House of Representatives from the 55th district
- In office January 5, 2009 – January 5, 2015
- Preceded by: Michael Lange
- Succeeded by: Vince Ricci

Personal details
- Born: December 8, 1950 (age 75) Salt Lake City, Utah, U.S.
- Party: Republican
- Spouse: Susan
- Children: 6
- Education: University of Utah (BS)

Cary Smith (born December 8, 1950) is an American politician and former Republican member of the Montana Legislature. He was elected to the Montana House of Representatives and the Montana Senate from the Billings area. He served as the Senate Majority Leader from 2021 to 2023.

Montana Senate
Preceded by Fred Thomas	Majority Leader of the Montana Senate; 2021–2023	Succeeded by Steve Fitzpatrick
