= Debby Barrett =

American politician

President of the Montana Senate
- In office January 5, 2015 – January 2, 2017
- Preceded by: Jeff Essmann
- Succeeded by: Scott Sales

Member of the Montana Senate from the 36th district
- In office January 2008 – January 2017
- Preceded by: Bill Tash
- Succeeded by: Jeffrey Welborn

Personal details
- Party: Republican
- Spouse: Mike

Debby Barrett is a former Republican member of the Montana Legislature. She was elected for Senate District 36, representing the Dillon, Montana area, in 2008. She previously served 4 terms in the House of Representatives.

Barrett served as President of the Senate during the 2015-2016 session.
