= Margarett Campbell =

American politician

Member of the Montana House of Representatives from the 31st district
- In office 2004 - 2010
- Succeeded by: Frank Smith

Personal details
- Born: 1955 (age 70–71)
- Party: Democratic Party
- Education: Northern Montana College, University of Montana
- Occupation: Vice President for Community Services, Fort Peck Community College

Margarett H. Campbell was a Democratic Party member of the Montana House of Representatives representing District 31. She served from 2004 to 2010. She was Minority Whip in 2008.
