= Bill Harris (Montana politician) =

American politician

Member of the Montana House of Representatives from the 37th district
- In office January 2, 2017 – January 2019
- Preceded by: Lee Randall
- Succeeded by: Eric Moore

Member of the Montana House of Representatives from the 30th into 29th district
- In office January 3, 2011 – January 2, 2017
- Preceded by: Dave Kasten
- Succeeded by: Dan Bartel

Personal details
- Born: Lewistown, Montana
- Party: Republican
- Education: Eastern Montana College
- Profession: rancher, business owner

Bill Harris is a Republican member of the Montana House of Representatives. As of 2017 he represents District 37.

He previously represented the 29th and 30th Districts. He has served in the 2011, 2013 and 2015 legislative sessions. He was first elected to District 30 of the House of Representatives in 2010, after which he assumed that office on January 3, 2011. Harris served District 30 until being redistricted in 2015. Bill Harris then represented District 29, which encompasses all of Petroleum County and most of Fergus County, Montana. Harris served in the army in the Vietnam War with the 1st Military Intelligence Battalion.

== Montana State Legislature ==
=== 2010 State House of Representatives election ===
Harris was uncontested in the primary election, having received 1,642 votes.

Harris was also uncontested in the general election, having received 3,527 votes.
