= Mike Fox (politician) =

American politician

Member of the Montana House of Representatives from the 32nd district
- Incumbent
- Assumed office January 6, 2025
- Preceded by: Jonathan Windy Boy

Member of the Montana Senate from the 16th district
- In office January 4, 2021 – January 6, 2025
- Preceded by: Frank Smith
- Succeeded by: Jonathan Windy Boy

Personal details
- Party: Democratic

Military service
- Allegiance: United States
- Branch/service: United States Coast Guard

Michael Fox is an American politician from Montana. Fox is a Democratic member of Montana House of Representatives representing District 32.

He previously served in the Montana Senate for Montana's 16th district from 2021 to 2024. He was elected to the seat after incumbent Democrat Frank Smith decided to run for a seat in the Montana House of Representatives instead of re–election. He defeated several Democratic candidates in the primary election, advancing to and winning the general election by default. A senate term in Montana is four years so he did not need to seek election in 2022.

In 2024 Fox contested the general election with Republican Jason Ulrich. He won with 60% of the vote.

Fox is a member of the American Indian Caucus. He is of Assiniboine and Chippewa Cree descent.
