= Holly Raser =

American politician

Member of the Montana House of Representatives from the 98th district
- In office 2001–2009

Personal details
- Party: Democratic Party
- Profession: educator

Holly Raser is a former Democratic Party member of the Montana House of Representatives who represented the 98th district from 2001 to 2009. She ran for Montana Superintendent of Public Instruction in 2008, losing in the Democratic primary.
