= Jacinda Morigeau =

American politician

Member of the Montana Senate from the 46th district
- Incumbent
- Assumed office January 6, 2025
- Succeeded by: Shannon O'Brien

Personal details
- Born: 1987 (age 38–39) Missoula, Montana
- Citizenship: United States; Confederated Salish and Kootenai Tribes
- Party: Democratic
- Domestic partner: Michael Johnson
- Relatives: Shane Morigeau (cousin)
- Education: University of Montana (BA)

Jacinda Morigeau is an American politician serving in the Montana Senate from the 46th district. First elected in 2024, she is a member of the Democratic Party. Morigeau is Bitterroot Salish and a citizen of the Confederated Salish and Kootenai Tribes.

Morigeau received a Bachelor of Arts in psychology and Native American Studies from the University of Montana. She operates a senior dog retirement home. She serves on the board for the All Nations Health Center.

== Electoral history ==
Montana Senate 46th district general election, 2024
Party	Candidate	Votes	%
Democratic	Jacinda Morigeau	7,328	58%
Republican	Charles Headley	5,252	42%
Total votes		12,580	100%

== See also ==
- List of Native American politicians
- Native American women in politics
