= Tom McGillvray =

American politician

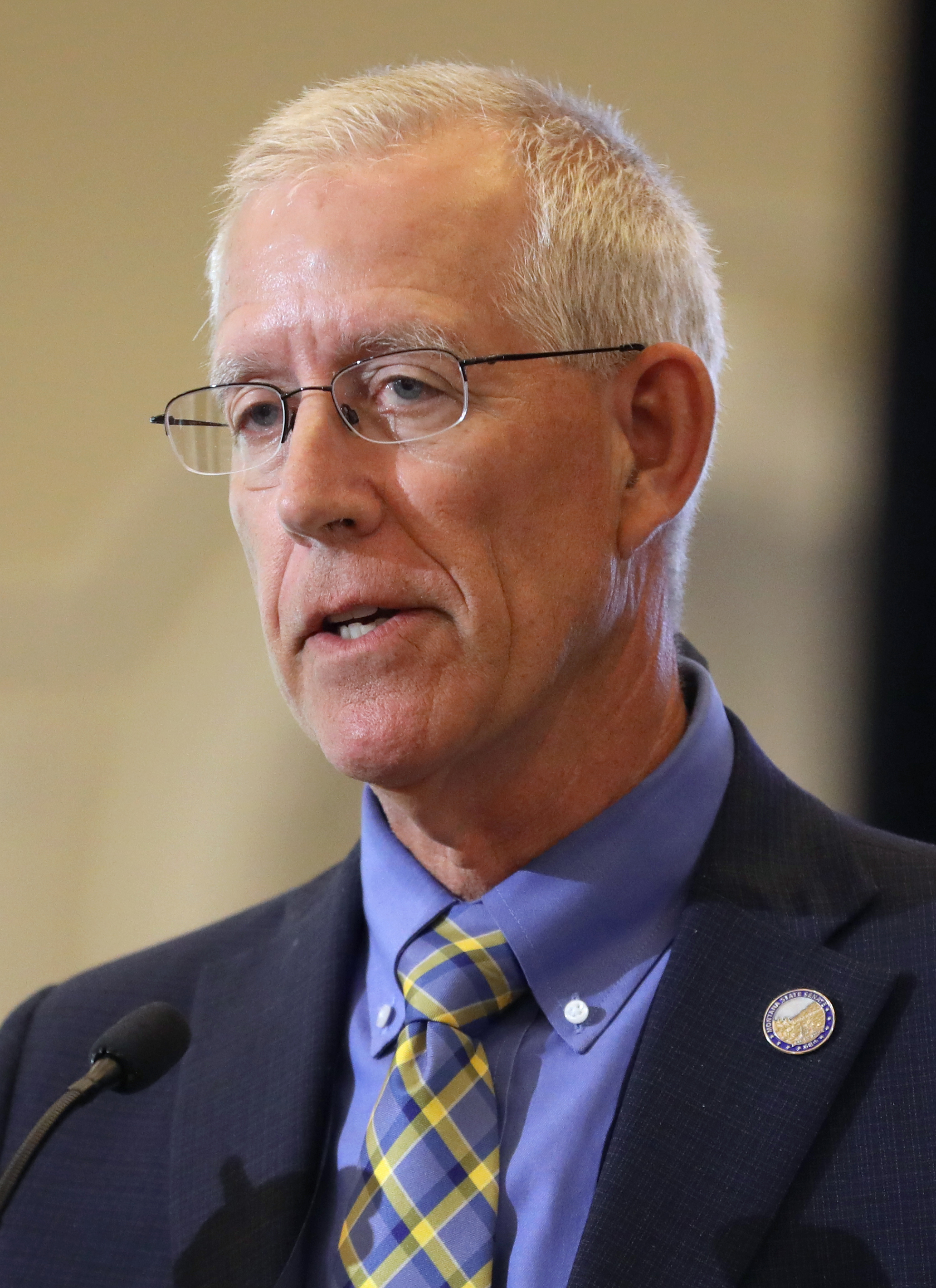

Majority Leader of the Montana Senate
- Incumbent
- Assumed office January 6, 2025
- Preceded by: Steve Fitzpatrick

Member of the Montana Senate
- Incumbent
- Assumed office January 6, 2025
- Preceded by: Chris Friedel
- Constituency: 26th
- In office January 4, 2021 – January 6, 2025
- Preceded by: Roger Webb
- Succeeded by: Emma Kerr-Carpenter
- Constituency: 23rd

Member of the Montana House of Representatives from the 50th district
- In office January 3, 2005 – January 7, 2013
- Preceded by: Rick Ripley
- Succeeded by: Dennis Lenz

Personal details
- Born: 1957 (age 68–69) Helena, Montana, U.S.
- Party: Republican
- Spouse: Margaret
- Children: 3
- Education: Montana State University (BS)

Tom McGillvray is an American politician and a Republican member of the Montana Senate. He was a member of the Montana House of Representatives from 2005 to 2013, where he represented House District 50. He currently represents the Billings, Montana, area. He served as House Majority Leader in 2011 legislative session, Assistant Republican leader in the 2009 legislative session and as Majority Whip during the 2007 legislative session.

McGillvray served as Chairman of the Republican Legislative Campaign Committee from 2005 to 2009 and as Vice Chairman from 2009 to 2011.

In the 2023 legislative session Sen. McGillvray served as Chairman of Senate Committee on Committees, Public Health, Ethics and Vice Chair of Senate Finance and Claims-Section D.

== Personal life ==
McGillvray received a Bachelor of Science degree from Montana State University. He served as an Ameriprise Financial advisor from 1990 to 2017 and retired in 2017 to run for the Montana State Senate.

McGillvray and his wife Margaret reside in Billings, Montana, and have three children.

Montana Senate
| Preceded by Steve Fitzpatrick | Majority Leader of the Montana Senate; 2025–present | Incumbent |
