= Dick Barrett (politician) =

American politician

Member of the Montana Senate from the 45th district
- In office January 5, 2015 – January 4, 2021
- Preceded by: Fred Thomas
- Succeeded by: Ellie Boldman

Member of the Montana Senate from the 47th district
- In office January 7, 2013 – January 5, 2015
- Preceded by: Ron Erickson
- Succeeded by: Cliff Larsen

Member of the Montana House of Representatives from the 93rd district
- In office January 5, 2009 – January 7, 2013
- Succeeded by: Douglas Coffin

Personal details
- Born: July 23, 1942 (age 84) Upland, California
- Party: Democratic
- Education: University of Wisconsin–Madison Swarthmore College

Dick Barrett (born July 23, 1942) is a former Democratic member of the Montana Legislature. He was elected to House District 93 which represents a portion of the Missoula area and was the State Senator of District 45 before his retirement in 2021, with his last official session occurring in 2019. During his farewell remarks to the Montana Senate Chamber on April 25, 2019 at the Montana Capitol Building in Helena, Montana, Senator Barrett serenaded his fellow members with his rendition of Arthur Sullivan's and W. S. Gilbert's "When all night long a chap remains" from their 19th century comedic opera, Iolanthe. His rendition was recorded by the Montana Public Affairs Network and can be enjoyed here.
