= Robyn Driscoll =

American politician and current Chair of the Montana Democratic Party

Chair of the Montana Democratic Party
- In office July 14, 2019 – September 14, 2025
- Preceded by: Mary Sexton
- Succeeded by: Shannon O'Brien

Member of the Montana Senate from the 26th district
- In office January 7, 2013 – January 2, 2017
- Preceded by: Lynda Moss
- Succeeded by: Margaret MacDonald

Member of the Montana House of Representatives from the 51st district
- In office January 3, 2005 – January 7, 2013
- Preceded by: Dave Gallik
- Succeeded by: Kelly McCarthy

Personal details
- Born: July 16, 1962 (age 64) Billings, Montana, U.S.
- Party: Democratic
- Education: Rocky Mountain College (BA)

Robyn Driscoll is an American politician and member of the Democratic Party. She was the chair of the Montana Democratic Party from 2019 until 2025, during which time the Party lost control of all statewide and federal elected seats and the Montana Republican Party won a supermajority in both chambers of the state legislature. She was a member of the Montana State Senate. She represented District 26 and then District 25. She was first elected to the Senate in 2012. Robyn Driscoll was formerly a member of the Montana House of Representatives, representing District 51 from 2005 to 2013. She has served in the 2005, 2007, 2009, 2011, 2013, and 2015 legislative sessions.

Driscoll served as a Minority Whip in the Senate during the 2015-2016 session.

Party political offices
Preceded by Mary Sexton	Chair of the Montana Democratic Party; 2019–2025	Succeeded by Shannon O'Brien
