= Dave McAlpin =

American politician

Member of the Montana House of Representatives from the 94th district
- In office 2005 - 2010

Personal details
- Born: Polson, Montana
- Party: Democratic Party
- Education: Carleton College (MN), University of Montana, Missoula
- Occupation: court administrator

Dave McAlpin was appointed by the Montana Supreme Court to serve as the Court Administrator of the Judicial Branch of State Government in October 2024. Prior to that he was an Administrative Law Judge in Helena, Montana.

As a member of the Montana Tax Appeal Board from 2013-2024, he was confirmed to both six-year terms by unanimous votes of the Montana State Senate. He was designated Chairman and presiding Judge in 2015. He is responsible for advocating that the name of the Board be changed from State Tax Appeal Board (STAB) to the Montana Tax Appeal Board (MTAB) 47 years after the Board was created by the 1972 Constitutional Convention delegates. During his tenure he presided over numerous hearings and authored dozens of opinions.

Prior to that McAlpin was appointed by the MT Attorney General to direct the Montana State Crime Laboratory in Missoula from 2009 to 2012. He is the only Montana Director elected by his peers to the National Board of Directors of the American Society of Crime Lab Directors.

A former Democratic member of the Montana House of Representatives, he represented House District 94 in Missoula during the 2005, 2007, and 2009 legislative sessions until his appointment as Director of the Crime Lab. In 2006 he was selected to join the Arthur S. Flemming Fellowship of the Institute of Progressive Leadership. While serving in the Montana Legislature, he served on the Taxation committee and was elected to House Leadership as Minority Whip.

He managed the Smokeless States Initiative in Montana for the Robert Wood Johnson Foundation from 2001 to 2003 securing smoke free policies in Montana bars and restaurants for the first time in history. He was Executive Director of Court Appointed Special Advocates (CASA) in Missoula. McAlpin also served as a congressional aide to Rep. Pat Williams (D-MT) and Sen. Max Baucus (D-MT) in Washington, DC and Montana.

He was the Chief Deputy Clerk of the Montana Supreme Court from 1995 to 1998.
