= Greg Hinkle =

American politician

Greg W. Hinkle

Member of the Montana Senate from the 7th district
- Incumbent
- Assumed office May 1, 2024
- Preceded by: Bob Brown
- In office 2009–2012
- Succeeded by: Jennifer Fielder

Personal details
- Born: November 12, 1946 (age 79) Bellingham, Washington
- Party: Republican
- Spouse: Gail
- Occupation: Custom woodworking

Greg W. Hinkle is a Republican member of the Montana Legislature. He was elected to Senate District 9, representing Thompson Falls, Montana, in 2008 and 2012. Hinkle served in the Army National Guard from 1966 to 1972. He owns Hinkle's Hardwood Furniture.

In May 2024, Hinkle returned to the Montana Senate after he was appointed to replace senator Bob Brown.
