= Shannon O'Brien (Montana politician) =

American politician

Chair of the Montana Democratic Party
- In office September 14, 2025 – October 12, 2026
- Preceded by: Robyn Driscoll
- Succeeded by: Bruce Knutson

Member of the Montana Senate from the 46th district
- In office January 4, 2021 – January 6, 2025
- Preceded by: Sue Malek
- Succeeded by: Jacinda Morigeau

Personal details
- Born: 1968 or 1969 (age 57–58) Portland, Oregon, U.S.
- Party: Democratic
- Spouse: Chuck
- Children: 1
- Education: University of Washington (BA); Gonzaga University (MEd); University of Montana (EdD)

Shannon O'Brien (born 1968/1969) is an American educator and politician who has served as the chair of the Montana Democratic Party from 2025 to 2026. A member of the Democratic Party, she was a member of the Montana Senate from the 46th district from 2021 to 2025, and ran unsuccessfully for Montana Superintendent of Public Instruction in 2024.

== Early life and education ==
O'Brien was born in Portland, Oregon. Raised on Orcas Island, Washington, she graduated from Orcas Island High School. She earned a Bachelor of Arts degree in political science from the University of Washington in 1991, a Master of Education from Gonzaga University, and an EdD from the University of Montana.

== Career ==
From 1994 to 1998, O'Brien was a history teacher at Stanwood High School in Stanwood, Washington. She was later an administrator at the Early College for Native Youth. From 2013 to 2015, she was an education policy advisor for Governor Steve Bullock. She was the dean of the Missoula College–University of Montana from 2015 to 2017 before accepting a "voluntary buyout" to step down as dean due to "budget concerns." O'Brien was elected to the Montana Senate in November 2020 and assumed office on January 4, 2021. She did not run for re-election in 2024, opting instead to run unsuccessfully for Montana Superintendent of Public Instruction.

In September 2025, O'Brien was elected chair of the Montana Democratic Party. She stepped down from chair on October 12, 2026 in order to endorse independent Seth Bodnar for US Senate, who is running against a Democrat, Republican, and Libertarian for the open Montana US Senate seat.

Party political offices
Preceded by Robyn Driscoll	Chair of the Montana Democratic Party; 2025–2026	Succeeded by Bruce Knutson
