= Cliff Larsen =

American politician

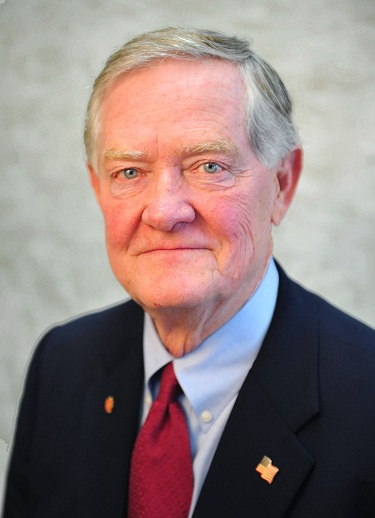

Member of the Montana Senate from the 47th district
- In office January 5, 2009 – January 5, 2015
- Preceded by: Dick Barrett
- Succeeded by: Daniel Salomon

Member of the Montana Senate from the 50th district
- In office January 5, 2015 – January 2, 2017
- Succeeded by: Tom Facey

Personal details
- Born: 1942 or 1943 (age 82–83)
- Party: Democratic
- Spouse: Trish
- Occupation: Rancher, politician

Cliff Larsen is a Democratic member of the Montana Legislature. He was elected for Senate District 50, representing the Missoula, Montana, area, in 2008.
