= Mark Sweeney (politician) =

American politician (1959–2022)

Member of the Montana Senate from the 39th district
- In office January 4, 2021 – May 6, 2022
- Preceded by: Gene Vuckovich
- Succeeded by: Jessica Wicks

Personal details
- Born: Mark Allen Sweeney; May 27, 1959 Butte, Montana, U.S.
- Died: May 6, 2022 (aged 62) Philipsburg, Montana, U.S.
- Party: Democratic
- Spouse: Sue
- Children: 2
- Education: University of Montana Western (BS)

Mark Allen Sweeney (May 27, 1959 – May 6, 2022) was an American politician and businessman who served as a member of the Montana Senate for the 39th district from January 4, 2021, until his death.

== Early life and education ==
Sweeney was born in Butte, Montana on May 27, 1959. He earned a Bachelor of Science degree in natural resource management from the University of Montana Western.

== Career ==
Sweeney served as a manager in the Montana Department of Fish, Wildlife and Parks from 1980 to 2012. He has also worked as the broker and owner of Montana Blue Ribbon Real Estate. Since 2010, he has operated a natural resources management consulting firm.

Sweeney was an unsuccessful candidate for the Montana Public Service Commission in 2012 and won a seat in the Montana House of Representatives in 2018. He was elected to the Montana Senate in November 2020, after winning a three-way race with 44.4-percent of the vote, defeating Republican candidate Suzzann Nordwick, and former Montana House Representative Gordon Pierson who received 12.6-percent of the vote with an Independent write-in campaign. Sweeney assumed office on January 4, 2021.

At the time of Sweeney's death, he was running for the Democratic nomination in Montana's 2nd congressional district for the 2022 election.

== Personal life ==
Sweeney lived in Philipsburg, Montana. He died at his home on May 6, 2022, aged 62.
