= Jon Ellingson =

American politician (born 1948)

Member of the Montana Senate from the 49th district
- In office 1998–2006

Personal details
- Born: August 21, 1948 (age 78) Rochester, New York, U.S.
- Party: Democratic
- Education: Harvard College (BA) Hastings College of Law (JD); University of Montana (MA)

Jon Ellingson is a Democratic member of the Montana Senate. He represented District 49 from 1998 to 2006 and was a member of the Montana House of Representatives from 1993 to 1996. In 2005, he was the Majority Leader of the Senate.
