= Ryan Osmundson =

American politician

Director of the Montana Governor's Office of Budget and Program Planning
- Incumbent
- Assumed office October 1, 2021
- Governor: Greg Gianforte
- Preceded by: Kurt Alme

Member of the Montana Senate from the 15th district
- In office January 2, 2017 – October 1, 2021
- Preceded by: Brad Hamlett
- Succeeded by: Dan Bartel

Member of the Montana House of Representatives from the 30th district
- In office January 3, 2011 – January 2, 2017
- Preceded by: Bill Harris
- Succeeded by: Wylie Galt

Personal details
- Born: 1979 (age 46–47) Oelwein, Iowa, U.S.
- Party: Republican
- Spouse: Jessica
- Children: 10

Ryan Osmundson is an American politician who served member of the Montana Senate for the 15th district from 2017 to 2021. He was previously a member of the Montana House of Representatives, representing the Buffalo, Montana area from 2011 to 2017.

In September 2021, it was announced that Osmundson would succeed Kurt Alme as director of the Montana Governor's Office of Budget and Program Planning.
