= Frank Smith (Montana politician) =

American politician

Member of the Montana House of Representatives from the 31st district
- Incumbent
- Assumed office January 4, 2021
- Preceded by: Bridget Smith

Member of the Montana Senate from the 16th district
- In office January 2, 2017 – January 4, 2021
- Preceded by: Jonathan Windy Boy
- Succeeded by: Mike Fox

Member of the Montana House of Representatives from the 31st district
- In office January 4, 2011 – January 7, 2013
- Preceded by: Margarett Campbell
- Succeeded by: Bridget Smith

Member of the Montana Senate from the 16th district
- In office January 3, 2005 – January 5, 2009
- Preceded by: Gary Perry
- Succeeded by: Jonathan Windy Boy

Member of the Montana House of Representatives from the 98th district
- In office January 4, 1999 – January 3, 2005
- Succeeded by: Holly Raser

Personal details
- Born: September 27, 1942 (age 83) Poplar, Montana, U.S.
- Party: Democratic
- Education: Dawson College

Frank J. Smith (born September 27, 1942) is an American politician. He is a Democratic member for the 31st district of the Montana House of Representatives. He has served four sessions for the Montana Senate and seven for the House of Representatives.

Smith first ran for office in 1998 for the 98th district of the House of Representatives. He worked three terms in that position. In 2004 he ran unopposed for Senate District 16. He ended his four year term in 2008. Smith ran unopposed for House District 31 in 2010 and served one session. During the 2016 elections he was a candidate again for the 16th senate district. He defeated G. Bruce Meyers and served another four year term.

After that he ran unopposed for the 31st house district in 2020. He faced challenger Arlie W. Gordon in 2022 and won with only 54% of the vote. In 2024 he defeated challenger Kevin Taylor with 60% of the vote, successfully keeping his seat.

Smith is a member of the American Indian Caucus. He is of Assiniboine and Sioux descent.
