= John Brenden =

Montana legislator

Member of the Montana Senate from the 17th district
- In office 1993 to 1994 and 2009 to 2016
- Preceded by: Sam Kitzenberg
- Succeeded by: Mike Lang

Personal details
- Born: 1941 (age 84–85)
- Party: Republican
- Spouse: Carol
- Education: Concordia College
- Occupation: Farmer

John C. Brenden was a Republican member of the Montana Legislature. He was elected for Senate District 18, representing Scobey, Montana in the 2009 and 2011 sessions. Due to redistricting he served District 17 from 2013 to 2016. He had previously served in 1993. Brenden received a BA from Concordia College in Political Science/Philosophy. He currently owns Brenden Farms.
