= Dan Bartel =

American politician

Member of the Montana Senate from the 15th district
- Incumbent
- Assumed office November 8, 2021
- Preceded by: Ryan Osmundson

Member of the Montana House of Representatives from the 29th district
- In office January 2, 2017 – November 8, 2021
- Preceded by: Bill Harris
- Succeeded by: Doug Flament

Personal details
- Born: 1957 (age 68–69) Lewistown, Montana
- Party: Republican
- Spouse: Danielle Bartel
- Children: 3

Dan Bartel is an American politician from Montana. He is a Republican who represented District 29 in the Montana House of Representatives, and now serves District 15 in the Montana Senate.

== Political career ==
Bartel was first elected to represent District 29 in the Montana House of Representatives in 2016. He was re-elected in 2018 and again in 2020.

Bartel currently sits on the following committees:

- General Government (Chair)
- Appropriations

=== Electoral record ===
2016 Republican primary: Montana House of Representatives, District 29
Party	Candidate	Votes	%
Republican	Dan Bartel	1,897	83.46%
Republican	Jeannie Walter	376	16.54%

2016 general election: Montana House of Representatives, District 29
Party	Candidate	Votes	%
Republican	Dan Bartel	4,032	80.22%
Democratic	Dryn Durley	994	19.78%

2018 general election: Montana House of Representatives, District 29
Party	Candidate	Votes	%
Republican	Dan Bartel	3,497	71.3%
Democratic	Rachel Stansberry	1,406	28.7%
