= Fred Thomas (American politician) =

American politician

Majority Leader of the Montana Senate
- In office January 2, 2017 – January 4, 2021
- Preceded by: Matt Rosendale
- Succeeded by: Cary Smith
- In office January 1, 2001 – January 3, 2005
- Preceded by: John Harp
- Succeeded by: Jon Ellingson

Member of the Montana Senate from the 44th district
- In office January 7, 2013 – January 2021
- Preceded by: Bob Lake
- Succeeded by: Theresa Manzella
- In office January 6, 1997 – January 1, 2007
- Preceded by: ???
- Succeeded by: ???

Member of the Montana House of Representatives from the 44th district
- In office January 7, 1985 – January 4, 1993
- Preceded by: ???
- Succeeded by: ???

Personal details
- Born: June 27, 1958 (age 68) Hamilton, Montana, U.S.
- Party: Republican
- Education: Montana State University, Bozeman (BS)

Fred Thomas (born June 27, 1958) is an American politician. He served in the Montana Senate and was majority leader from 2017 to 2021.

== Biography ==
Thomas was born on June 27, 1958, in Hamilton, Montana. His grandfather, Fred A. Thomas, was a member of the Montana House of Representatives. In 2009, Thomas became vice president of the National Association of Professional Insurance Agents.

== Political career ==
Thomas was a member of the House of Representatives from 1985 to 1992. He became a member of the Senate in 1997 and served as the Senate Majority Leader from 2000 to 2004. Thomas returned to the Senate in 2012 and was elected Senate Majority Leader in 2017.

Montana Senate
Preceded by John Harp	Majority Leader of the Montana Senate; 2001–2005	Succeeded by Jon Ellingson
Preceded by Matt Rosendale	Majority Leader of the Montana Senate; 2017–2021	Succeeded by Cary Smith
