= Mike Phillips (Montana politician) =

American politician

Member of the Montana Senate from the 31st district
- In office January 7, 2013 – January 4, 2021
- Preceded by: Ron Arthun
- Succeeded by: Christopher Pope

Member of the Montana House of Representatives from the 66th district
- In office January 1, 2007 – January 7, 2013
- Preceded by: Christopher Harris
- Succeeded by: Jennifer Pomnichowski

Personal details
- Born: March 24, 1958 (age 68) Charleston, Illinois
- Party: Democratic
- Spouse: Linda
- Education: University of Illinois; University of Alaska
- Profession: Biologist

Mike Phillips (born March 24, 1958) is an American politician and a former Democratic Party member of the Montana State Senate, representing District 31 from 2013 to 2021.
