= Christopher Pope (politician) =

American politician

Member of the Montana Senate from the 31st district
- Incumbent
- Assumed office January 4, 2021
- Preceded by: Mike Phillips

Member of the Montana House of Representatives from the 65th district
- In office January 6, 2019 – January 4, 2021
- Preceded by: Jon Knokey
- Succeeded by: Kelly Kortum
- In office January 5, 2015 – January 2, 2017
- Preceded by: Kathleen Williams
- Succeeded by: Jon Knokey

Personal details
- Born: December 4, 1952 (age 73) Biloxi, Mississippi, U.S.
- Party: Democratic
- Spouse: Maddy Pope
- Children: 2
- Education: Yale University; University of Oregon

Christopher Pope is an American politician serving as a member of the Montana Senate from the 31st district. He was previously a member of the Montana House of Representatives from 2015 to 2017 and again from 2019 to 2021.
