= Jim Keane (politician) =

American politician

Member of the Montana House of Representatives from the 73rd district
- In office January 2, 2017 – January 2, 2023
- Preceded by: Edith McClafferty
- Succeeded by: Jennifer Lynch
- In office 2001–2007

Member of the Montana Senate from the 38th district
- In office January 5, 2009 – January 5, 2015
- Preceded by: Dan Harrington
- Succeeded by: Edith McClafferty

Personal details
- Born: 1941 (age 84–85) Butte, Montana, U.S.
- Party: Democratic
- Spouse: Dolores Keane
- Children: 3

Jim Keane (born 1941) is an American politician who served as a Democratic member of the Montana House of Representatives for the 73rd district from 2017 to 2023.

== Early life and education ==
Keane was born in 1941 in Butte, Montana. He graduated from Butte Central High School and studied at the University of Hawaiʻi, Montana Technological University, Western Montana College, and the University of Wyoming.

== Career ==
Keane served in the Montana House from 2017 to 2023 and previously served from 2001 to 2007. He is also former member of the Montana Senate and represented the 38th district from 2009 to 2015.
