= Christine Kaufmann (politician) =

American politician

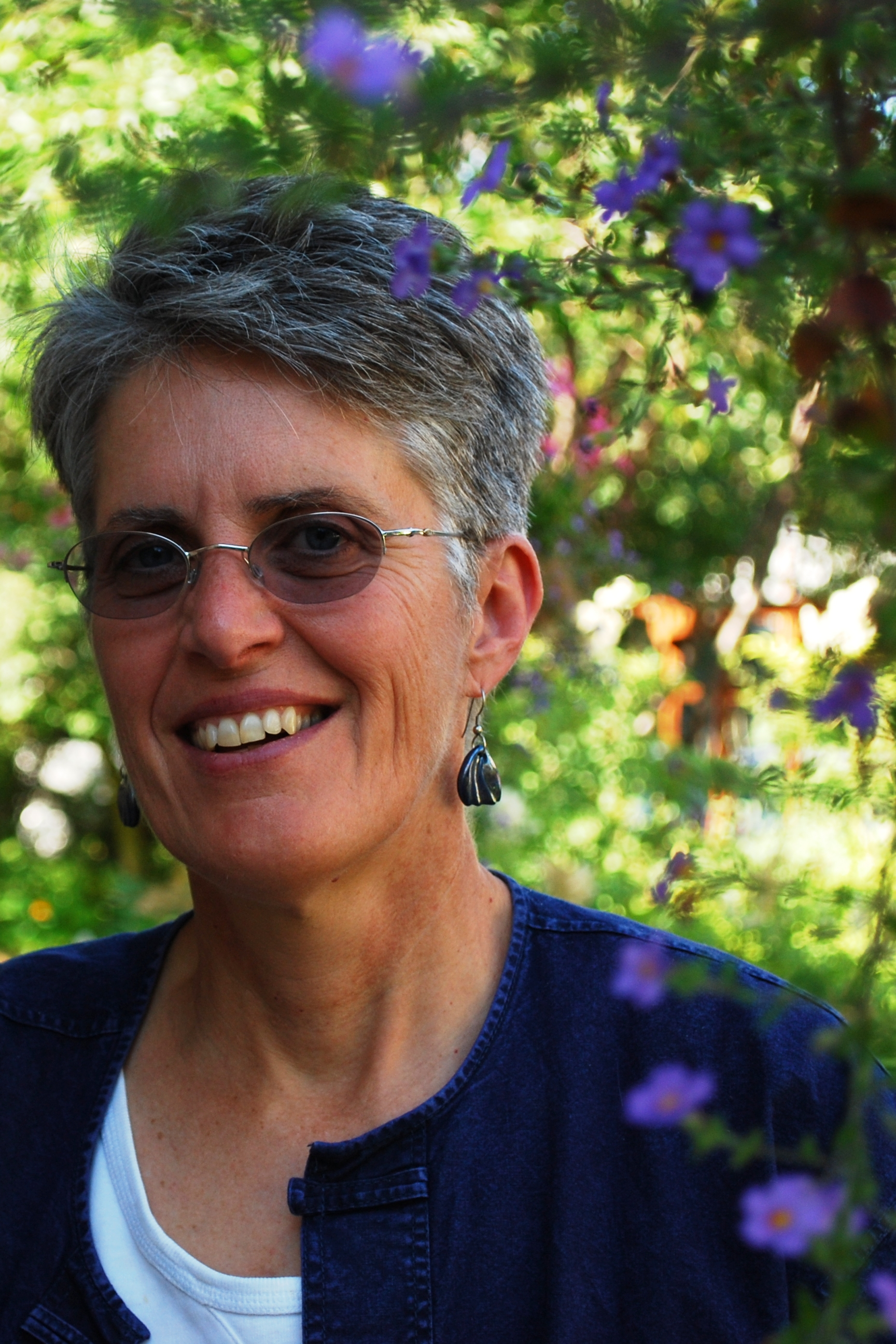
- Kaufmann in 2009.

Member of the Montana Senate from the 40th district
- In office January 3, 2007 – January 2, 2017
- Preceded by: Ken Toole
- Succeeded by: Terry Gauthier

Member of the Montana House of Representatives from the 81st district
- In office 2000 – January 3, 2007
- Preceded by: David Ewer
- Succeeded by: Galen Hollenbaugh

Personal details
- Born: December 25, 1951 (age 74)
- Party: Democratic
- Education: Goshen College (BA); University of Montana (MA)
- Website: ckaufmann.com

Christine Kaufmann (born December 25, 1951) is a Montana politician. A member of the Montana Senate from January 2007 to 2016, she previously served three terms in the Montana House of Representatives. She last represented the 41st senate district, based in Helena, Montana.

== Biography ==
Kaufmann was raised on a small Mennonite family farm in Illinois with 11 siblings. She earned a Bachelor's degree from Goshen College and a Master's degree from the University of Montana.

A Democrat, she was first elected to the State House of Representatives in 2000 from the state's 53rd district in Helena, winning a four-way primary election with 49% of the vote. She was elected after having received more roughly two-thirds of the votes cast in the general election.

As a result of the 2006 general election, Senator Ken Toole resigned from the Montana Senate, as he was elected to the Montana Public Service Commission. The following month, Kaufmann, was appointed by the Lewis and Clark County commissioners to replace him in the senate. The seat was up for election in 2008 and, on June 3, 2008, she faced a primary challenge from termed out State Representative Hal Jacobson. Kaufmann was elected, having received 54% of the vote.

A lesbian, she is the first ever openly gay Montana state senator. She was one of three LGBT members of the Montana legislature in 2015, serving alongside Diane Sands and Bryce Bennett. Her election campaigns have received endorsements from the Gay & Lesbian Victory Fund.
