= Chris Friedel =

American politician

Member of the Montana Senate from the 26th district
- In office January 4, 2021 – January 6, 2025
- Preceded by: Margaret MacDonald
- Succeeded by: Tom McGillvray

Personal details
- Born: December 8, 1979 (age 46)
- Party: Republican
- Spouse: Leslie
- Children: 2
- Education: Montana Technological University (BA)

Christopher Friedel (born December 8, 1979) is an American Republican politician who serves as a member of the Montana Senate for Senate District 26. After defeating Republican state representative Rodney Garcia in the district's primary election, Friedel won the general election in 2020 against incumbent Democrat Margaret MacDonald, the lone Senate seat that switched parties in that year's elections. Prior to serving in the Montana Senate, Friedel was a member of the Billings City Council from 2015 to 2019.
