= Missoula College =

Public junior college in Missoula, Montana, US

Coordinates: 46°50′52″N 114°00′43″W

- Type: Public junior college
- Established: 1956; Became part of the University of Montana in 1994
- Parent institution: University of Montana
- Academic affiliations: Space-grant
- Dean: Tom Gallagher
- Location: Missoula, Montana, United States
- Website: www.umt.edu/missoula-college

Missoula College is the junior college of the University of Montana in Missoula, Montana. The college was founded in 1956 and became part of the University of Montana in 1994. It offers 35 programs including career, transfer, and technical programs. The five academic departments include the Department of Applied Computing and Electronics, Department of Industrial Technology, Department of Applied Arts and Sciences, Department of Business Technology, and Department of Health Professions. The college also provides workforce development for the region as well as dual credit courses for hundreds of high school students in the area, and works to support adults seeking new career opportunities or professional development. During the Fall 2010 semester, 2,444 students were enrolled at Missoula College.

== Facilities and location ==
Missoula College is composed of a brand new River Campus located across the river from the main university campus and a second, trades-oriented campus, located next to Fort Missoula Park. As a unit of the University of Montana, incoming freshmen are exposed to the same services and expectations as students who primarily attend UM's main campus. The River campus is home to a library, the culinary program with a student-run cafe, health sciences with cadaver labs, study areas on every floor and administration. The West Campus is the home of the Department of Industrial Technology with ample acreage for student-built modular homes and a large excavation/heavy equipment test area. As a whole, the Missoula College consists of 200.4 acres of land. Missoula College is one of Montana's two-year colleges. In addition to dining options on UM's main, or Mountain Campus, students can eat breakfast and lunch at the college's West Campus Cafeteria or the East Campus Hunter Dining Room and Cafeteria.

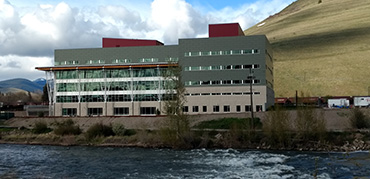
Missoula College River Campus

== History ==
Missoula College was previously known as the University of Montana College of Technology and the Missoula Vocational Technical Center until it became a college within the University of Montana in the fall of 1994. The name change was a sign of the school's expanding responsibilities as it became an integral part of the university while still providing a wide variety of professional and technical programs. The school was governed by Missoula County High Schools until July 1989, when the Montana Board of Regents took over that responsibility.

== Academic departments and programs ==
=== Department of Applied Arts and Sciences ===
This department focuses on instruction in communication, science, writing, mathematics, and social science, and oversees the Associate of Arts Degree.

=== Department of Applied Computing and Engineering Technology ===
The Department of Applied Computing and Engineering Technology is a member of several organizations, including Cisco Regional Networking Academy and North American Board of Certified Energy Practitioners. The department offers Certificate of Applied Science programs in Computer-Aided Design and Computer Support, as well as Associate of Applied Science Degrees in Computer Technology, Electronics Technology and Energy Technology. A Bachelor of Applied Science Degree is also available to students who have completed an Associate of Applied Science Degree.

=== Department of Business Technology ===
The Business Department is the largest within the college, covering six academic areas: Accounting Technology, Administrative Management, Culinary Arts, Management, Medical Information Technology, and Paralegal Studies. Each respective program offers an Associate of Applied Science Degree or certificate upon completion.

=== Department of Health Professions ===
The department offers Associate of Applied Science Degrees in Medical Assisting, Practical Nursing, Radiologic Technology, Respiratory Care, and Surgical Technology. The department also offers an Associate of Science Degree in Registered Nursing and a certificate in Pharmacy Technology. The Medical Assisting program is currently under review, however, and is not accepting new students at this time.

=== Department of Industrial Technology ===
The Department of Industrial Technology is located on the college's West campus. The department encompasses six programs: Building Maintenance Engineering, Sustainable Construction, Diesel Equipment Technology, Heavy Equipment Operation, Machining, and Welding Technology. The Building Maintenance Engineering, Heavy Equipment Operation, and Milling and Machining programs are one-year programs that offer a Certificate of Applied Science upon completion. The Sustainable Construction and Welding Technology programs both offer either a one-year Certificate of Applied Science or a two-year Associate of Applied Science Degree upon completion, while the Diesel Equipment Technology is a two-year program that offers only an Associate of Applied Science Degree.

=== Outreach Program ===
A notable feature of Missoula College is its Outreach Program, a program that offers individuals who are unable to attend daytime or structured classes an opportunity to fulfill requirements despite a busy schedule. Online courses, evening and weekend classes, short courses, summer programs and other options are available.

== Achievements and recognition ==
The college is the only higher education institution in Montana to be designated as a National Center of Academic Excellence in Cyber Defense.
