= Ellie Boldman =

American attorney and politician

Member of the Montana Senate from the 45th district
- Incumbent
- Assumed office January 4, 2021
- Preceded by: Dick Barrett

Member of the Montana House of Representatives
- In office January 5, 2015 – January 7, 2019
- Preceded by: Ed Greef
- Succeeded by: Marilyn Marler
- Constituency: 90th District
- In office January 3, 2011 – January 5, 2015
- Preceded by: Dave McAlpin
- Succeeded by: Kimberly Dudik
- Constituency: 94th District

Personal details
- Born: June 30, 1975 (age 51) Scottsdale, Arizona
- Party: Democratic
- Spouse: Tyler Smith
- Education: Boise State University (BS), University of Idaho College of Law, (JD)
- Profession: Lawyer

Ellie Boldman (née Hill Smith; born June 30, 1975) is an American attorney and politician serving as a Democratic member of the Montana Senate, representing District 45. Previously, she served in the Montana House of Representatives, representing District 90, which includes central Missoula, Montana, from 2011 through 2019. Due to state constitutional term limits, Boldman was unable to file for re-election to the Montana House of Representatives and subsequently filed for election to the Montana Senate Seat 45 in 2020.

== Private life and education ==
Boldman attended the College of Idaho on a soccer scholarship and after suffering a knee injury, transferred to Boise State University, where she graduated with a bachelor's degree in psychology and a minor in English in 1997. Later, she attended the University of Idaho, College of Law, where she earned a Juris Doctor degree in 2001. In law school, she was the president of the student chapter of the Idaho Trial Lawyers Association. She interned for the Nez Perce Tribal Count in Lapwai, Idaho, and also for Dave Bieter.

Upon graduation, Boldman worked at the Ada County Prosecutor's Office, and the Garden City, Idaho Attorney's Office. She also became active with the Idaho Democratic Party, where she worked for the campaigns for Keith Roark for Idaho Attorney General in 2002 and Dave Bieter for Boise Mayor in 2004.

In 2025, Boldman pled guilty to a DUI.

Boldman lives in Missoula with her husband, Tyler Smith, and their three children.

== Political career ==
Boldman was appointed by Montana House and Senate Democratic leadership to co-chair the Montana Democratic Legislative Campaign Committee ("MDLCC") for the 2013-2014 election cycle.

She is a former member of the national board of directors of National Conference of State Legislatures, and served as the Western Region Democratic Representative on the executive board of the Women's Legislative Network of National Conference of State Legislatures in 2014. She also served on the national board of directors of the American Association of University Women, and was elected in 2012 as National Vice President for the Young Democrats of America. Other organizations she has led include: the Montana State Director of Young Elected Officials Network, Women's Legislator's Lobby, and the National Conference of Environmental Legislators.

Boldman was elected as a Montana state delegate to the Democratic National Convention for both presidential nominations for President Obama in 2008 in Denver, Colorado, and 2012 in Charlotte, North Carolina.

Boldman was named by Time magazine as one of the "40 Under 40 Political Rising Stars in the Nation". In 2015, she was also named by The Washington Post as one of the state's "Best Political Tweeters".

=== Policy positions ===
In 2015, Boldman sponsored House Bill 318, which expanded mandatory insurance coverage for kids with Down syndrome in Montana. The bill was signed by Governor Steve Bullock.

For several sessions, she sponsored a bill that would have required residential adolescent youth programs to be regulated like other schools for vulnerable youth. Montana currently has an exemption to regulation if the programs are religiously affiliated. There were several schools in Montana with allegations of significant abuse and neglect and the state was limited in its ability to intervene.

Boldman is an advocate for gun violence prevention.

Boldman supported Senate Bill 396 in 2015, which amended state motor carrier laws and created a separate Class E classification for transportation network carrier services like Uber and Lyft. Later that year Uber named Boldman officially "Passenger Zero" in Montana for her work to bring Uber to Montana, and was invited to take Montana's first Uber ride in Missoula.

She served as the vice chair of the House Human Services Committee, and supported Medicaid expansion under the Affordable Care Act.
