= Sue Malek =

American politician from Montana

Member of the Montana Senate from the 46th district
- In office January 7, 2013 – January 4, 2021
- Preceded by: Carol Williams
- Succeeded by: Shannon O'Brien

Member of the Montana House of Representatives from the 98th district
- In office 2009 – January 7, 2013
- Succeeded by: Jenifer Gursky

Personal details
- Born: October 29, 1951 (age 74) Minot, North Dakota
- Party: Democratic

Sue Malek (born October 29, 1951) is an American politician who served as a member of the Montana Senate for the 46th district from 2013 to 2021. Malek previously served as a member of the Montana House of Representatives for the 98th district from 2009 to 2013.
