= Rick Ripley =

American politician

Member of the Montana Senate from the 10th district 9th (2009-2011)
- In office 2009 – January 2, 2017
- Preceded by: John Cobb
- Succeeded by: Steve Fitzpatrick

Member of the Montana House of Representatives from Montana

Personal details
- Party: Republican

Rick Ripley was a Republican member of the Montana Legislature. He was elected to Senate District 9, representing Wolf Creek, Montana, in 2009 and 2011. In 2013 and 2015, he represented District 10. He previously served 4 terms in the House of Representatives.
