= Brad Molnar =

American politician

Member of the Montana Public Service Commission from the 2nd district
- Incumbent
- Assumed office January 6, 2025; Suspended: July 9, 2026 – present
- Preceded by: Tony O'Donnell
- In office January 2005 – January 2013
- Preceded by: Jay Stovall
- Succeeded by: Kirk Bushman

Member of the Montana Senate from the 28th district
- In office January 4, 2021 – January 6, 2025
- Preceded by: Tom Richmond
- Succeeded by: Forrest Mandeville

Personal details
- Born: April 14, 1950 (age 76) Walkerton, Indiana, U.S.
- Party: Republican
- Children: 3
- Education: University of Montana (attended)

Brad A. Molnar (born April 14, 1950) is an American politician and former businessman serving as a member of the Montana Public Service Commission, representing the 2nd district since January 2025. He previously served on the commission from 2005 to 2013 and in the Montana Senate, representing the 28th district from 2021 to 2025.

== Early life and education ==
Molnar was born in Walkerton, Indiana and raised in Laurel, Montana. He studied forestry and journalism at the University of Montana, but did not earn a degree.

== Career ==
Molnar owned and operated a building construction company for 33 years. He previously served as a member of the Montana House of Representatives from 1993 to 1999 and the Montana Public Service Commission from 2005 to 2011. He was elected to the Montana Senate in November 2020 and assumed office on January 4, 2021.

Molnar was elected to new term on the Montana Public Service Commission in 2024. In July 2026 he was suspended from his position for one year by Governor Greg Gianforte following accusations of misconduct.
