= Jonathan Windy Boy =

American politician

Member of the Montana Senate
- Incumbent
- Assumed office January 6, 2025
- Preceded by: Mike Fox
- Constituency: 16th district
- In office January 5, 2009 – January 2, 2017
- Preceded by: Frank Smith
- Succeeded by: Frank Smith

Member of the Montana House of Representatives
- In office January 2, 2017 – January 6, 2025
- Preceded by: Bruce Meyers
- Succeeded by: Mike Fox
- Constituency: 32nd district
- In office January 6, 2003 – January 5, 2009
- Constituency: 92nd district

Personal details
- Born: August 28, 1958 (age 67) Fort Belknap, Montana, U.S.
- Citizenship: American; Chippewa Cree
- Party: Democratic
- Children: 2
- Education: Northern Montana University (attended); Southwestern Indian Polytechnic Institute (AA)

Jonathan Windy Boy (born August 28, 1958) is an American politician, currently serving as a member of the Montana Senate, and previously served in the Montana House of Representatives. From 2008 to 2016, he served in the Montana Senate. In 2019, he stepped down from legislative duties. The sexual misconduct stemmed from inappropriate texts he sent in 2017 to female colleagues between mid-August and October. Allegations and anecdotes began circulating of his history sexual misconduct on the reservation. He ran for re-election as Representative of District 32 and served in the 2021 session.

== Career ==
In 2002, Windy Boy was elected to the Montana House of Representatives, representing House District 32. He has been a member of the Tribal Council of the Chippewa Cree Tribe since 1999. He was elected Chippewa Cree Tribe Vice-chairman from 2008 to 2010. In 2011, he opposed changing Montana law to revoke the drivers license of any teenager caught in possession of alcohol, but agreed that any teenager with a DUI should be banned from holding a driver's license until age 18. In 2012, he endorsed a Republican candidate, Sandy Welch, for State Superintendent of Education.

In 2013, he introduced Montana Senate bill 342, which allocates $2 million for a Montana Indian Language Preservation Pilot Program, which will "provide funding to Montana’s eight tribes to develop materials to keep their languages alive for future generations." He serves as a full-time THPO for the Chippewa-Cree Tribe of Rocky Boy where he works with a private business on section 106 consultation process.

In February 2026, Windy Boy announced his candidacy for Montana's 2nd congressional district in the 2026 election.

== Personal life ==
Born and raised in Box Elder, Montana, he is divorced and has two children. He is known as a traditional dancer, and has worked in oil field exploration, and as a drug and alcohol prevention speaker.
