= Gene Vuckovich =

American politician (1936–2022)

Member of the Montana Senate from the 39th district
- In office January 3, 2011 – January 2021
- Preceded by: Jesse Laslovich
- Succeeded by: Mark Sweeney

Personal details
- Born: March 9, 1936 Anaconda, Montana, U.S.
- Died: July 12, 2022 (aged 86) Anaconda, Montana, U.S.
- Party: Democratic
- Spouse: Noreen Vuckovich (m. 1957-2016)

William Eugene Vuckovich (March 9, 1936 – July 12, 2022) was an American politician who served as a member of the Montana Senate for the 39th district from 2011 to 2019. He was elected for Senate District 39, representing the Anaconda, Montana area, in 2010. Vuckovich was a former city-county manager of Anaconda-Deer Lodge County. He could not run for re-election because of term limits. Vuckovich died in Anaconda, Montana on July 12, 2022, at the age of 86.
