= Carl Glimm =

American politician from Montana

Member of the Montana Senate from the 2nd district
- Incumbent
- Assumed office January 4, 2021
- Preceded by: Dee Brown

Member of the Montana House of Representatives from the 6th district
- In office January 7, 2013 – January 4, 2021
- Preceded by: Bill Beck
- Succeeded by: Amy Regier

Personal details
- Born: Conrad, Montana
- Party: Republican
- Spouse: Amy Glimm
- Children: 2
- Education: Montana State University (BS)
- Occupation: General contractor

Carl Glimm is an American politician serving as a member of Montana Senate from the 2nd district. He was previously a member of the Montana House of Representatives for the 6th district from 2013 to 2021. He is a member of the Montana Freedom Caucus.

== Early life and education ==
Glimm was born in Conrad, Montana. In 1997, Glimm earned a Bachelor of Science degree in construction engineering technology from Montana State University.

== Career ==
Glimm is a general contractor. On November 6, 2012, Glimm won the election and became a Republican member of Montana House of Representatives for District 6, defeating Brenda Talbert with 66.87% of the votes. He was re-elected in 2014, 2016, and 2018.

== Personal life ==
Glimm and his wife, Amy, have three children. Glimm and his family live in Kila, Montana.

== See also ==
- Montana House of Representatives, District 6
