= Margaret MacDonald (politician) =

American politician (born 1951)

Member of the Montana Senate from the 26th district
- In office January 2, 2017 – January 4, 2021
- Preceded by: Robyn Driscoll
- Succeeded by: Chris Friedel

Member of the Montana House of Representatives from the 54th and 51st district
- In office January 5, 2009 – January 2, 2017
- Preceded by: Gary Branae
- Succeeded by: Adam Rosendale

Personal details
- Born: August 31, 1951 (age 75) Glendive, Montana, U.S.
- Party: Democratic
- Spouse: John Smillie
- Children: 2
- Education: University of Montana (BA)

Margaret "Margie" MacDonald (born August 31, 1951) is an American politician who served as a member of the Montana Senate for the 26th district from 2017 to 2021. She previously served four terms in the Montana House of Representatives, representing the 54th and 51st district. She also served as Democratic minority whip in both chambers of the legislature.

== Early life and education ==
Born in Glendive, Montana, MacDonald earned a Bachelor of Arts degree in journalism from the University of Montana.

== Career ==
For 14 years, she was director of the Montana Association of Churches, among other actions organizing the Not In Our Town campaign against racism and white supremacy. She also served as a staff director of the Northern Plains Resource Council. She then worked for a year as head of the Office of Community Service under Democratic Governor Brian Schweitzer, before resigning in 2006 to run for office. As of 2016, when she was a candidate for the state senate, she was a regional organizer for the Western Organization of Resource Councils.

In 2006, MacDonald ran unsuccessfully for the Montana Senate to succeed Brent Cromley in District 26; she was narrowly defeated by Republican Roy Brown, who had termed out of the state House.

In 2008 MacDonald was elected to the Montana House of Representatives from District 54, south Billings, defeating Republican Debra Bonogofsky. She was re-elected three times; from 2013, as a result of redistricting, she represented House District 51. She served as minority whip.

She was elected to the State Senate from district 26 in 2016, defeating Republican Don Roberts. She ran unopposed in the Democratic primary for reelection in the 2020 general election, but was defeated by Republican Chris Friedel.

== Personal life ==
MacDonald is married to John Smillie and has two children.
