= Vince Ricci =

American politician

Member of the Montana House of Representatives from the 55th district
- Incumbent
- Assumed office January 5, 2015
- Preceded by: Cary Smith

Personal details
- Born: 1953 (age 72–73) Livingston, Montana
- Party: Republican
- Spouse: Debbie
- Children: Three

Vince Ricci (born 1953) is an American politician in the Montana Senate. He was a Republican member of the Montana House of Representatives, representing District 55. He was first elected in 2014 and sworn in in January 2015.
