= Ryan Lynch (politician) =

American politician

Ryan Lynch is an American politician and a Democratic member of the Montana Senate. He previously served in the Montana House of Representatives.
