= Theresa Manzella =

American politician (born 1964)

Member of the Montana Senate from the 44th district
- Incumbent
- Assumed office January 4, 2021
- Preceded by: Fred Thomas

Member of the Montana House of Representatives from the 85th district
- In office January 5, 2015 – January 4, 2021
- Preceded by: Gordon Pierson
- Succeeded by: Michele Binkley

Personal details
- Born: November 26, 1964 (age 61) Pontiac, Michigan, U.S.
- Party: Republican
- Spouse: Ken

Theresa Manzella (born November 26, 1964) is an American politician. She serves as a Republican member of the Montana Senate, representing District 44 since January 2021. From 2015 to 2021, she served in the Montana House of Representatives, representing District 85, which included parts of Hamilton, Montana.

== Career ==
According to her official biography, Theresa Manzella was formerly employed at Pontiac Motors headquarters and from 1985 to 1990 as a supervisor at Electronic Data Systems. She has also been the owner of TNT Paints & Performance Horses since 1992 and was the founder of Willing Servants, Inc.

In the 2016 Republican Party presidential primaries, Manzella supported Ted Cruz and, after Ted Cruz dropped out of the race, Donald Trump. Manzella ran for the Montana Senate in 2020. In the Republican primary, she faced fellow representative Nancy Ballance, with Manzella reported to be the more conservative of two candidates. Manzella won the primary, earning 63% of the vote in the primary and subsequently won the general election.

In the Montana Legislature, Manzella has been aligned with the right-wing faction of the state Republican Party (who called themselves "38 Specials" in reference to the bullet cartridge of that name), which has clashed with comparatively moderate Republicans (the "Solutions Caucus") who joined with Democrats on some issues. Manzella opposed the 2018 Medicaid expansion bill in Montana, and accused Republicans who supported it of betrayal because the citizens had voted Medicaid Expansion down as a ballot initiative in 2018.

In the 2019 Montana Legislature, Manzella sponsored a bill (HB 575) that would have eliminated almost all childhood vaccine requirements for day care centers for those who claimed a religious objection.

In a 2018 post on the Ravalli County Republicans' Facebook group, Manzella claimed that the local schoolteachers' union, MEA-MFT, was, "working against our constitution and for socialism and communism." The co-president of the local union responded that Manzella's claims were false and slanderous. State Senate candidate Jason Ellsworth, a fellow Republican, also criticized Manzella's remarks.

In 2023, Manzella was elected as Chair of the Montana Freedom Caucus.
