= Jen Gross =

American politician

Member of the Montana Senate from the 25th district
- In office January 2, 2017 – January 6, 2025
- Preceded by: Robyn Driscoll
- Succeeded by: Dennis Lenz

Personal details
- Born: Billings, Montana
- Party: Democratic
- Education: Montana State University Billings

Jen Gross is a Democratic member of the Montana Senate, where she represents District 25. She was first elected in 2016. Gross was re-elected to the state senate in 2020.

== Career ==
Gross has worked as a community organizer and on political campaigns since 2008. She was the manager of field operations at Planned Parenthood of Montana when she was appointed as the replacement candidate for SD 25 in August 2016.

In December 2019, The Washington Post detailed how an editorial in the Billings Gazette against Medicare-for-all by Gross was drafted with the help of a lobbying group, Partnership for America's Health Care Future. Gross said she writes less than half of her op-eds.
