= Edith McClafferty =

American politician (born 1960)

Member of the Montana Senate from the 38th district
- Incumbent
- Assumed office January 2, 2017
- Preceded by: Jim Keane

Member of the Montana House of Representatives from the 73rd district
- In office January 5, 2015 – January 2, 2017
- Preceded by: Pat Noonan
- Succeeded by: Jim Keane

Member of the Montana House of Representatives from the 75th district
- In office January 5, 2009 – January 5, 2015
- Succeeded by: Kirk Wagoner

Personal details
- Born: 1960 (age 65–66) Butte, Montana
- Party: Democratic
- Education: University of Montana Western (BA)

Edith McClafferty (born 1960) is a Democratic member of the Montana Senate district 38 and has served in this capacity since 2017. Previously, she served as a member of the Montana Legislature from 2009 to 2016 for the 75th district. She currently serves as the Vice Chair of the Montana Senate Education Committee.
