= Terry Gauthier =

American politician (born 1957)

Member of the Montana Senate from the 40th district
- Incumbent
- Assumed office January 2, 2017
- Preceded by: Christine Kaufmann

Personal details
- Born: 1957 (age 68–69) Spokane, Washington
- Party: Republican
- Spouse: Somer
- Children: 2

Terry Gauthier (born 1957) is an American politician serving as a Republican member of the Montana Senate from District 40, which includes Helena, Montana.

Gauthier sponsored the Montana Museums Act of 2020, which funded the restoration of historical sites and museums statewide. The bill was signed into law in December 2019.

Gauthier is married to his spouse Somer; they have two children and reside in Helena.
