= Walt Sales =

American politician from Montana

Member of the Montana Senate from the 35th district
- In office January 4, 2021 – January 6, 2025
- Preceded by: Scott Sales
- Succeeded by: Tony Tezak

Member of the Montana House of Representatives from the 69th district
- In office January 2, 2017 – January 4, 2021
- Preceded by: Matthew Monforton
- Succeeded by: Jennifer Carlson

Personal details
- Born: Manhattan, Montana, U.S.
- Party: Republican
- Spouse: LaRae Sales
- Children: 3
- Education: Montana State University

Walt Sales is an American politician who served as a member of Montana House of Representatives for District 69 from 2017 to 2021.

== Personal life ==
Sales' wife is LaRae Sales. They have three children.
