= Mike Lang (Montana politician) =

American politician

Member of the Montana Senate from the 17th district
- Incumbent
- Assumed office January 2, 2017
- Preceded by: John Brenden

Personal details
- Born: 1949 (age 76–77) Fort Belknap, Montana
- Party: Republican
- Spouse: Lorna
- Children: 3
- Education: Eastern Montana College (BS)
- Website: www.MikeLangforMontana.com

Mike Lang is an American politician serving as a Republican member of the Montana Senate, where he represents District 17, including Malta, Montana. He chairs the Senate Agriculture, Livestock and Irrigation Committee.
