= Steve Fitzpatrick =

American politician (born 1978)

Majority Leader of the Montana House of Representatives
- Incumbent
- Assumed office January 6, 2025
- Preceded by: Sue Vinton

Majority Leader of the Montana Senate
- In office January 2, 2023 – January 6, 2025
- Preceded by: Cary Smith
- Succeeded by: Tom McGillvray

Member of the Montana House of Representatives
- Incumbent
- Assumed office January 6, 2025
- Preceded by: Steven Galloway
- Constituency: 24th district
- In office January 3, 2011 – January 2, 2017
- Preceded by: Deborah Kottel
- Succeeded by: Fred Anderson
- Constituency: 20th district

Member of the Montana Senate from the 10th district
- In office January 2, 2017 – January 6, 2025
- Preceded by: Rick Ripley
- Succeeded by: Jeremy Trebas

Personal details
- Born: December 2, 1978 (age 47) Helena, Montana, U.S.
- Party: Republican
- Education: Montana State University, Bozeman (BA); Arizona State University, Tempe (JD)
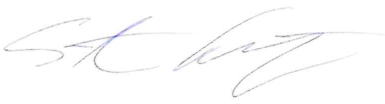
- Signature

Steven J. Fitzpatrick (born December 2, 1978) is an American politician of the Republican party in the Montana Senate. Before being elected to the Senate, Fitzpatrick served in the Montana House of Representatives for the 20th district from 2011 to 2017.

== Personal life ==
Fitzpatrick was born and raised in Helena, Montana. He earned his bachelor's degree in biology from Montana State University. He then went to law school at Arizona State University. He was a law clerk for Judge Thomas Honzel of the Montana First Judicial District Court.

Fitzpatrick is a lawyer with the law firm of Browning, Kaleczyc, Berry & Hoven, P.C. Fitzpatrick and his wife Julia are the parents of three daughters.

Montana Senate
Preceded by Cary Smith	Majority Leader of the Montana Senate; 2023–2025	Succeeded by Tom McGillvray
Montana House of Representatives
Preceded by Sue Vinton	Majority Leader of the Montana House of Representatives; 2025–present	Incumbent
