= Daniel Salomon (politician) =

American politician

Member of the Montana Senate from the 47th district
- In office January 2, 2017 – January 6, 2025
- Preceded by: Cliff Larsen
- Succeeded by: Ellie Boldman

Member of the Montana House of Representatives from the 93rd district
- In office January 5, 2015 – January 2, 2017
- Preceded by: Douglas Coffin
- Succeeded by: John Fleming

Member of the Montana House of Representatives from the 12th district
- In office January 3, 2011 – January 5, 2015
- Preceded by: John Fleming
- Succeeded by: Greg Hertz

Personal details
- Born: January 27, 1957 (age 69) Ronan, Montana
- Party: Republican
- Education: Montana State University
- Profession: Farmer, dairyman

Daniel Salomon (born January 27, 1957) was a Republican member of the Montana Senate, where he represented Senate District 47 which represents the Ronan, Montana, area. He also served in the Montana House of Representatives from 2011 to 2017.

== See also ==
- Montana House of Representatives, District 12
