= Roger Webb (politician) =

American politician

Roger Webb is an American politician. He served as a Republican member of the Montana Senate, where he represented District 23, including parts of Billings, Montana, in the 2013, 2015, and 2017 sessions.

== Personal life ==
Webb's wife is Peggy Webb, a politician. They have two daughters. Webb and his family live in Billings, Montana.
