= Steve Hinebauch =

American politician

Member of the Montana Senate from the 18th district
- Incumbent
- Assumed office 2017
- Preceded by: Matt Rosendale

Personal details
- Born: Havre, Montana
- Party: Republican
- Spouse: Beth
- Children: 6

Steve Hinebauch is an American politician. He serves as a Republican member of the Montana Senate, where he represents District 18, including Wibaux, Montana.

== Political career ==
In 2016, Hinebauch ran for election to represent District 18 in the Montana State Senate, which was an open seat as incumbent Matt Rosendale was not running for re-election. Hinebauch won a three-way Republican primary with 51.15% of the vote, and was unopposed in the general election. He is running for re-election in 2020.

As of June 2020, Hinebauch sits on the following committees:

- Fish and Game (Vice Chair)
- Public Health, Welfare, and Safety
- Judiciary
