= Tom Richmond (Montana politician) =

American politician

Tom Richmond is an American politician and former Republican member of the Montana Senate, where he represented District 28, including parts of Billings, Montana.
