= Jeffrey Welborn =

American politician

Jeff Welborn

Member of the Montana Public Service Commission from the 3rd district
- Incumbent
- Assumed office January 6, 2025
- Preceded by: Roger Koopman

Personal details
- Born: Dillon, Montana, U.S.
- Party: Republican
- Education: May Technical College (attended); Montana State University, Billings (attended)

Jeffrey W. "Jeff" Welborn is a Republican member of the Montana Senate. He was elected to House District 72 which represents the Dillon area and now serves as a State Senator of District 36. In 2022, he supported the state of Montana's proposed purchase of a 5,600-acre ranch from Shodair Children's Hospital in order to open up 100,000 acres of public land for easier access by the public.
