= Jason Small (politician) =

American politician

Member of the Montana Senate from the 21st district
- Incumbent
- Assumed office 2017
- Preceded by: Sharon Stewart-Peregoy

Personal details
- Born: July 1, 1978 (age 48) Hardin, Montana, U.S.
- Party: Republican
- Children: 2
- Education: Sheridan College (AAS)

Jason D. Small (born July 1, 1978) is an American politician serving as a member of the Montana Senate from the 21st district, which includes Busby, Montana. He is a member of the Northern Cheyenne Nation.

Small earned an Associate of Applied Science degree in welding and metallurgy from Sheridan College. Outside of politics, he has worked as a boilermaker.
