= 2024 Montana House of Representatives election =

- November 5, 2024

All 100 seats in the Montana House of Representatives 51 seats needed for a majority
| | Majority party | Minority party |
|---|---|---|
| Leader | Matt Regier (term-limited) | Kim Abbott (term-limited) |
| Party | Republican | Democratic |
| Leader since | January 2, 2023 | January 4, 2021 |
| Leader's seat | 5th (Note: Redistricted from the 4th district.)–Columbia Falls | 82nd (Note: Redistricted from the 83rd district.)–Helena |
| Last election | 68 | 32 |
| Seats won | 58 | 42 |
| Seat change | ▼10 | ▲10 |
| Popular vote | 355,586 | 208,871 |
| Percentage | 62.29% | 36.59% |
| Swing | ▼1.53% | ▲1.42% |
- Results: Democratic gain Republican hold Democratic hold
Speaker before election
Matt Regier
Republican
Elected Speaker
Brandon Ler
Republican

The 2024 Montana House of Representatives election was held on November 5, 2024, alongside the 2024 United States elections.

This was the first election under new legislative lines adopted by an independent, bipartisan commission in 2023.

Although Republicans maintained the majority, Democrats had a 10-seat net gain, ending the Republicans' supermajority.

== Partisan background ==
In Montana's 2020 Presidential Election, Donald Trump won the 61 House districts, while Joe Biden won 39. Going into the 2024 House elections, Democrats held District 27 in Havre (Trump +16%) and Majority-Minority District 42 in Big Horn County (Trump +2%). Republicans held Districts 41, 46, 57, 60, 91, and 92, where Biden won in 2020. Redistricting created two new competitive districts, 65 and 66 in Gallatin County, both favoring Biden.

2020 Presidential data by House district: Trump: 40–50% 50–60%; 60–70%; 70–80%; 80–90%; Biden: 40–50%; 50–60%; 60–70%; 70–80%; 80–90%

== Retirements ==
Thirty-four incumbents did not seek re-election.

=== Democrats ===
1. District 5: Dave Fern was term-limited (ran for State Senate).
2. District 15: Marvin Weatherwax Jr. retired.
3. District 32: Jonathan Windy Boy was term-limited (ran for State Senate).
4. District 42: Sharon Stewart-Peregoy was term-limited (ran for State Senate).
5. District 60: Laurie Bishop was term-limited.
6. District 61: Jim Hamilton was term-limited.
7. District 63: Alice Buckley retired.
8. District 74: Derek Harvey retired to run for State Senate.
9. District 79: Laura Smith retired to run for State Senate.
10. District 83: Kim Abbott was term-limited.

=== Republicans ===
1. District 1: Steve Gunderson was term-limited.
2. District 4: Matt Regier was term-limited (ran for State Senate).
3. District 10: Bob Keenan retired.
4. District 11: Tanner Smith retired to run for Governor.
5. District 14: Denley Loge was term-limited (ran for State Senate).
6. District 17: Ross Fitzgerald was term-limited.
7. District 20: Fred Anderson was term-limited.
8. District 22: Lola Sheldon-Galloway was term-limited (ran for State Senate).
9. District 27: Joshua Kassmier retired to run for State Senate.
10. District 29: Edward Butcher retired.
11. District 33: Casey Knudsen was term-limited.
12. District 34: Rhonda Knudsen retired to run for State Senate.
13. District 36: Bob Phalen retired to run for State Senate.
14. District 41: Gayle Lammers retired to run for State Senate.
15. District 50: Naarah Hastings retired.
16. District 51: Mike Yakawich retired to run for State Senate.
17. District 54: Terry Moore retired.
18. District 56: Sue Vinton was term-limited (ran for State Senate).
19. District 72: Tom Welch was term-limited.
20. District 78: Gregory Frazer retired to run for State Senate.
21. District 88: Wayne Rusk retired to run for State Senate.
22. District 92: Mike Hopkins was term-limited.
23. District 93: Joe Read was term-limited.

== Predictions ==
| Source | Ranking | As of |
|---|---|---|
| CNalysis | Solid R | June 13, 2024 |

== Incumbents defeated ==
=== In primary election ===
Five incumbent representatives, all Republicans, were defeated in the June 4 primary election.

==== Republicans ====
1. District 8: Tony Brockman lost re-nomination to Lukas Schubert.
2. District 20: Steven Galloway lost re-nomination to Melissa Nikolakakos.
3. District 68: Jennifer Carlson lost a redistricting race to Caleb Hinkle.
4. District 78: James Bergstrom lost re-nomination to Randyn Gregg.
5. District 85: Michele Binkley lost re-nomination to Kathy Love.

== Results summary ==
2024 Montana House of Representatives election General election — November 5, 2024
| Party | Votes | Percentage | Seats | +/– |
|---|---|---|---|---|
| Republican | 355,586 | 62.29 | 58 | ▼10 |
| Democratic | 208,871 | 36.59 | 42 | ▲10 |
| Libertarian | 4,057 | 0.71 | 0 | 0 |
| Independents | 2,320 | 0.41 | 0 | 0 |
| Totals | 570,834 | 100 | 100 | — |

| District | Incumbent | Party | Elected | Party |
|---|---|---|---|---|
| 1st | Neil Duram (Note: Redistricted from the 2nd district.) | Rep | Neil Duram | Rep |
| 2nd | Steve Gunderson† (Note: Redistricted from the 1st district.) | Rep | Tom Millett | Rep |
| 3rd | Dave Fern† (Note: Redistricted from the 5th district.) | Dem | Debo Powers | Dem |
| 4th | New Seat | | Lyn Bennett | Rep |
| 5th | Braxton Mitchell (Note: Redistricted from the 3rd district.) | Rep | Braxton Mitchell | Rep |
| 5th | Matt Regier† (Note: Redistricted from the 4th district.) | Rep | Braxton Mitchell | Rep |
| 6th | Amy Regier | Rep | Amy Regier | Rep |
| 7th | Courtenay Sprunger | Rep | Courtenay Sprunger | Rep |
| 8th | Tony Brockman (Note: Redistricted from the 9th district.) | Rep | Lukas Schubert | Rep |
| 9th | Tanner Smith† (Note: Redistricted from the 11th district.) | Rep | Steven Kelly | Rep |
| 10th | Terry Falk (Note: Redistricted from the 8th district.) | Rep | Terry Falk | Rep |
| 11th | New Seat | | Ed Byrne | Rep |
| 12th | Bob Keenan† (Note: Redistricted from the 10th district.) | Rep | Tracy Sharp | Rep |
| 13th | Linda Reksten (Note: Redistricted from the 12th district.) | Rep | Linda Reksten | Rep |
| 14th | Paul Fielder (Note: Redistricted from the 13th district.) | Rep | Paul Fielder | Rep |
| 15th | Marvin Weatherwax Jr.† | Dem | Thedis Crowe | Dem |
| 16th | Tyson Running Wolf | Dem | Tyson Running Wolf | Dem |
| 17th | Ross Fitzgerald† | Rep | Zachary Wirth | Rep |
| 17th | Zachary Wirth (Note: Redistricted from the 80th district.) | Rep | Zachary Wirth | Rep |
| 18th | Llew Jones | Rep | Llew Jones | Rep |
| 19th | New Seat | | Jane Weber | Dem |
| 20th | Steven Galloway (Note: Redistricted from the 24th district.) | Rep | Melissa Nikolakakos | Rep |
| 21st | Ed Buttrey | Rep | Ed Buttrey | Rep |
| 22nd | George Nikolakakos (Note: Redistricted from the 26th district.) | Rep | George Nikolakakos | Rep |
| 23rd | Eric Tilleman | Rep | Eric Tilleman | Rep |
| 23rd | Fred Anderson† (Note: Redistricted from the 20th district.) | Rep | Eric Tilleman | Rep |
| 24th | New Seat | | Steve Fitzpatrick | Rep |
| 25th | Steve Gist | Rep | Steve Gist | Rep |
| 25th | Lola Sheldon-Galloway† (Note: Redistricted from the 22nd district.) | Rep | Steve Gist | Rep |
| 26th | Russ Miner (Note: Redistricted from the 19th district.) | Rep | Russ Miner | Rep |
| 26th | Joshua Kassmier† (Note: Redistricted from the 27th district.) | Rep | Russ Miner | Rep |
| 27th | Paul Tuss (Note: Redistricted from the 28th district.) | Dem | Paul Tuss | Dem |
| 28th | Casey Knudsen† (Note: Redistricted from the 33rd district.) | Rep | Eric Albus | Rep |
| 29th | Rhonda Knudsen† (Note: Redistricted from the 34th district.) | Rep | Valerie Moore | Rep |
| 30th | New Seat | | Morgan Thiel | Rep |
| 31st | Frank Smith | Dem | Frank Smith | Dem |
| 32nd | Jonathan Windy Boy† | Dem | Mike Fox | Dem |
| 33rd | Brandon Ler (Note: Redistricted from the 35th district.) | Rep | Brandon Ler | Rep |
| 33rd | Bob Phalen† (Note: Redistricted from the 36th district.) | Rep | Brandon Ler | Rep |
| 34th | Jerry Schillinger (Note: Redistricted from the 37th district.) | Rep | Jerry Schillinger | Rep |
| 35th | Gary Parry (Note: Redistricted from the 39th district.) | Rep | Gary Parry | Rep |
| 36th | Greg Kmetz (Note: Redistricted from the 38th district.) | Rep | Greg Kmetz | Rep |
| 37th | Edward Butcher† (Note: Redistricted from the 29th district.) | Rep | Shane Klakken | Rep |
| 38th | Greg Oblander (Note: Redistricted from the 40th district.) | Rep | Greg Oblander | Rep |
| 39th | Kerri Seekins-Crowe (Note: Redistricted from the 43rd district.) | Rep | Kerri Seekins-Crowe | Rep |
| 40th | Sue Vinton† (Note: Redistricted from the 56th district.) | Rep | Mike Vinton | Rep |
| 41st | Gayle Lammers† | Rep | Jade Sooktis | Dem |
| 42nd | Sharon Stewart-Peregoy† | Dem | Sidney Fitzpatrick | Dem |
| 43rd | Larry Brewster (Note: Redistricted from the 44th district.) | Rep | Larry Brewster | Rep |
| 44th | Katie Zolnikov (Note: Redistricted from the 45th district.) | Rep | Katie Zolnikov | Rep |
| 45th | Denise Baum (Note: Redistricted from the 47th district.) | Dem | Denise Baum | Dem |
| 46th | Emma Kerr-Carpenter (Note: Redistricted from the 49th district.) | Dem | Emma Kerr-Carpenter | Dem |
| 47th | Naarah Hastings† (Note: Redistricted from the 50th district.) | Rep | James Reavis | Dem |
| 48th | Mike Yakawich† (Note: Redistricted from the 51st district.) | Rep | Curtis Schomer | Rep |
| 49th | Sherry Essmann (Note: Redistricted from the 52nd district.) | Rep | Sherry Essmann | Rep |
| 50th | Terry Moore† (Note: Redistricted from the 54th district.) | Rep | Anthony Nicastro | Rep |
| 51st | Jodee Etchart (Note: Redistricted from the 48th district.) | Rep | Jodee Etchart | Rep |
| 52nd | Bill Mercer (Note: Redistricted from the 46th district.) | Rep | Bill Mercer | Rep |
| 53rd | Nelly Nicol | Rep | Nelly Nicol | Rep |
| 54th | Lee Deming (Note: Redistricted from the 55th district.) | Rep | Lee Deming | Rep |
| 55th | Brad Barker (Note: Redistricted from the 58th district.) | Rep | Brad Barker | Rep |
| 56th | Fiona Nave (Note: Redistricted from the 57th district.) | Rep | Fiona Nave | Rep |
| 57th | Marty Malone (Note: Redistricted from the 59th district.) | Rep | Scott Rosenzweig | Dem |
| 58th | Laurie Bishop† (Note: Redistricted from the 60th district.) | Dem | Jamie Isaly | Dem |
| 59th | Ed Stafman (Note: Redistricted from the 62nd district.) | Dem | Ed Stafman | Dem |
| 59th | Jim Hamilton† (Note: Redistricted from the 61st district.) | Dem | Ed Stafman | Dem |
| 60th | New Seat | | Alanah Griffith | Dem |
| 61st | Alice Buckley† (Note: Redistricted from the 63rd district.) | Dem | Becky Edwards | Dem |
| 62nd | New Seat | | Josh Seckinger | Dem |
| 63rd | New Seat | | Peter Strand | Dem |
| 64th | Kelly Kortum (Note: Redistricted from the 65th district.) | Dem | Kelly Kortum | Dem |
| 65th | New Seat | | Brian Close | Dem |
| 66th | Eric Matthews | Dem | Eric Matthews | Dem |
| 67th | Jedediah Hinkle | Rep | Jedediah Hinkle | Rep |
| 68th | Caleb Hinkle | Rep | Caleb Hinkle | Rep |
| 68th | Jennifer Carlson (Note: Redistricted from the 69th district.) | Rep | Caleb Hinkle | Rep |
| 69th | Ken Walsh (Note: Redistricted from the 71st district.) | Rep | Ken Walsh | Rep |
| 70th | Tom Welch† (Note: Redistricted from the 72nd district.) | Rep | Shannon Maness | Rep |
| 71st | New Seat | | Scott DeMarois | Dem |
| 72nd | Donavon Hawk (Note: Redistricted from the 76th district.) | Dem | Donavon Hawk | Dem |
| 73rd | Jennifer Lynch | Dem | Jennifer Lynch | Dem |
| 73rd | Derek Harvey† (Note: Redistricted from the 74th district.) | Dem | Jennifer Lynch | Dem |
| 74th | New Seat | | Marc Lee | Dem |
| 75th | Marta Bertoglio | Rep | Marta Bertoglio | Rep |
| 76th | John Fitzpatrick (Note: Redistricted from the 77th district.) | Rep | John Fitzpatrick | Rep |
| 76th | Gregory Frazer† (Note: Redistricted from the 78th district.) | Rep | John Fitzpatrick | Rep |
| 77th | Jane Gillette (Note: Redistricted from the 64th district.) | Rep | Jane Gillette | Rep |
| 78th | James Bergstrom (Note: Redistricted from the 84th district.) | Rep | Randyn Gregg | Rep |
| 79th | Laura Smith† | Dem | Luke Muszkiewicz | Dem |
| 80th | Melissa Romano (Note: Redistricted from the 81st district.) | Dem | Melissa Romano | Dem |
| 81st | Mary Caferro (Note: Redistricted from the 82nd district.) | Dem | Mary Caferro | Dem |
| 82nd | Kim Abbott† (Note: Redistricted from the 83rd district.) | Dem | Pete Elverum | Dem |
| 83rd | Jill Cohenour (Note: Redistricted from the 84th district.) | Dem | Jill Cohenour | Dem |
| 84th | Julie Dooling (Note: Redistricted from the 70th district.) | Rep | Julie Dooling | Rep |
| 85th | Michele Binkley | Rep | Kathy Love | Rep |
| 86th | David Bedey | Rep | David Bedey | Rep |
| 87th | Ron Marshall | Rep | Ron Marshall | Rep |
| 88th | Wayne Rusk† | Rep | Greg Overstreet | Rep |
| 89th | Mark Thane (Note: Redistricted from the 99th district.) | Dem | Mark Thane | Dem |
| 89th | Lyn Hellegaard (Note: Redistricted from the 97th district.) | Rep | Mark Thane | Dem |
| 90th | Denley Loge† (Note: Redistricted from the 14th district.) | Rep | Curtis Cochran | Rep |
| 91st | Joe Read† (Note: Redistricted from the 93rd district.) | Rep | Shelly Fyant | Dem |
| 92nd | Connie Keogh (Note: Redistricted from the 91st district.) | Dem | Connie Keogh | Dem |
| 92nd | Mike Hopkins† | Rep | Connie Keogh | Dem |
| 93rd | Katie Sullivan (Note: Redistricted from the 89th district.) | Dem | Katie Sullivan | Dem |
| 94th | Marilyn Marler (Note: Redistricted from the 90th district.) | Dem | Marilyn Marler | Dem |
| 95th | Zooey Zephyr (Note: Redistricted from the 100th district.) | Dem | Zooey Zephyr | Dem |
| 96th | Bob Carter (Note: Redistricted from the 98th district.) | Dem | Bob Carter | Dem |
| 97th | New Seat | | Melody Cunningham | Dem |
| 98th | Jonathan Karlen (Note: Redistricted from the 96th district.) | Dem | Jonathan Karlen | Dem |
| 99th | Tom France (Note: Redistricted from the 94th district.) | Dem | Tom France | Dem |
| 100th | SJ Howell (Note: Redistricted from the 95th district.) | Dem | SJ Howell | Dem |

† - Incumbent not seeking re-election

=== Close races ===
Districts where the margin of victory was under 10%:

1. District 57, 0.26% gain
2. District 62, 2.42% gain
3. District 15, 2.73%
4. District 3, 3.66%
5. District 4, 4.03% gain
6. District 42, 4.34%
7. District 60, 4.82% gain
8. District 27, 5.22%
9. District 47, 5.74% gain
10. District 45, 5.84%
11. District 46, 5.96%
12. District 20, 7%
13. District 63, 7.24% gain
14. District 80, 7.57%
15. District 58, 7.96%
16. District 91, 8.25% gain
17. District 19, 9.21% gain

== Detailed results ==
=== Districts 1–19 ===
==== District 1 ====
The new 1st district includes the home of incumbent Republican Neil Duram, who has represented the 2nd district since 2019, will now represent the 1st district due to redistricting.

Montana House of Representatives 1st district general election, 2024
| Party | Candidate | Votes | % |
|---|---|---|---|
| Republican | Neil Duram (incumbent) | 5,541 | 79.97% |
| Democratic | Dakota Adams | 1,388 | 20.03% |
| Total votes | | 6,929 | 100% |
| Republican hold | | | |

==== District 2 ====
The new 2nd district includes the home of incumbent Republican Steve Gunderson, who has represented the 1st district since 2017, was ineligible to run for re-election due to term limits. He originally intended to run in the Republican primary for Montana State Auditor, but later withdrew. Republican Tom Millett won the open seat.

Montana House of Representatives 2nd district Republican primary election, 2024
| Party | Candidate | Votes | % |
|---|---|---|---|
| Republican | Tom Millett | 1,283 | 57.12% |
| Republican | Thomas Jenkins | 963 | 42.88% |
| Total votes | | 2,246 | 100% |

Montana House of Representatives 2nd district general election, 2024
| Party | Candidate | Votes | % |
|---|---|---|---|
| Republican | Tom Millett | 4,600 | 78.70% |
| Democratic | Brad Simonis | 1,245 | 21.30% |
| Total votes | | 5,845 | 100% |
| Republican hold | | | |

==== District 3 ====
The new 3rd district includes the home of incumbent Democrat Dave Fern, who has represented the 5th district since 2017. Fern was ineligible to run for re-election due to term limits and ran for State Senate District 2. Former Representative Debo Powers won the open seat.

Montana House of Representatives 3rd district Democratic primary election, 2024
| Party | Candidate | Votes | % |
|---|---|---|---|
| Democratic | Debo Powers | 1,005 | 73.25% |
| Democratic | Guthrie Quist | 367 | 26.75% |
| Total votes | | 1,372 | 100% |

Montana House of Representatives 3rd district general election, 2024
| Party | Candidate | Votes | % |
|---|---|---|---|
| Democratic | Debo Powers | 3,554 | 51.78% |
| Republican | Cathy Mitchell | 3,310 | 48.22% |
| Total votes | | 6,864 | 100% |
| Democratic hold | | | |

==== District 4 ====
The new 4th district includes parts of Whitefish and Columbia Falls. It has no incumbent. Republican Lyn Bennett won the open seat.

Montana House of Representatives 4th district general election, 2024
| Party | Candidate | Votes | % |
|---|---|---|---|
| Republican | Lyn Bennett | 3,171 | 52.04% |
| Democratic | Lindsey Jordan | 2,922 | 47.96% |
| Total votes | | 6,093 | 100% |
| Republican win (new seat) | | | |

==== District 5 ====
The new 5th district includes the homes of incumbent Republican Braxton Mitchell, who has represented the 3rd district since 2021, and incumbent Republican and House Speaker Matt Regier, who has represented the 4th district since 2017. Reiger was ineligible to seek re-election due to term limits and ran for State Senate District 5, while Mitchell was re-elected here.

Montana House of Representatives 5th district general election, 2024
| Party | Candidate | Votes | % |
|---|---|---|---|
| Republican | Braxton Mitchell (incumbent) | 4,671 | 73.85% |
| Democratic | Steve Paugh | 1,654 | 26.15% |
| Total votes | | 6,325 | 100% |
| Republican hold | | | |

==== District 6 ====
Incumbent Republican Amy Regier has represented the 6th district since 2021.

Montana House of Representatives 6th district general election, 2024
| Party | Candidate | Votes | % |
|---|---|---|---|
| Republican | Amy Regier (incumbent) | 5,131 | 69.52% |
| Democratic | Velvet Phillips-Sullivan | 2,250 | 30.48% |
| Total votes | | 7,381 | 100% |
| Republican hold | | | |

==== District 7 ====
Incumbent Republican Courtenay Sprunger has represented the 7th district since 2023.

Montana House of Representatives 7th district Republican primary election, 2024
| Party | Candidate | Votes | % |
|---|---|---|---|
| Republican | Courtenay Sprunger (incumbent) | 854 | 62.75% |
| Republican | Shaun Pandina | 507 | 37.25% |
| Total votes | | 1,361 | 100% |

Montana House of Representatives 7th district general election, 2024
| Party | Candidate | Votes | % |
|---|---|---|---|
| Republican | Courtenay Sprunger (incumbent) | 3,081 | 65.36% |
| Democratic | Arthur Fretheim | 1,633 | 34.64% |
| Total votes | | 4,714 | 100% |
| Republican hold | | | |

==== District 8 ====
The new 8th district includes the home of incumbent Republican Tony Brockman, who has represented the 9th district since 2023. Brockman lost re-nomination to Lukas Schubert, who went on to win the general election.

Montana House of Representatives 8th district Republican primary election, 2024
| Party | Candidate | Votes | % |
|---|---|---|---|
| Republican | Lukas Schubert | 1,516 | 59.61% |
| Republican | Tony Brockman (incumbent) | 1,027 | 40.39% |
| Total votes | | 2,543 | 100% |

Montana House of Representatives 8th district general election, 2024
| Party | Candidate | Votes | % |
|---|---|---|---|
| Republican | Lukas Schubert | 4,030 | 70.69% |
| Democratic | Beth Sibert | 1,671 | 29.31% |
| Total votes | | 5,701 | 100% |
| Republican hold | | | |

==== District 9 ====
The new 9th district includes the home of incumbent Republican Tanner Smith, who has represented the 11th district since 2023. Smith unsuccessfully ran in the Republican primary for Governor of Montana. Republican Steven Kelly won the open seat.

Montana House of Representatives 9th district Republican primary election, 2024
| Party | Candidate | Votes | % |
|---|---|---|---|
| Republican | Steven Kelly | 1,235 | 55.43% |
| Republican | Lee Huestis | 993 | 44.57% |
| Total votes | | 2,228 | 100% |

Montana House of Representatives 9th district general election, 2024
| Party | Candidate | Votes | % |
|---|---|---|---|
| Republican | Steven Kelly | 4,807 | 74.55% |
| Democratic | Joanne Morrow | 1,641 | 25.45% |
| Total votes | | 6,448 | 100% |
| Republican hold | | | |

==== District 10 ====
The new 10th district includes the home of incumbent Republican Terry Falk, who has represented the 8th district since 2023.

Montana House of Representatives 10th district general election, 2024
| Party | Candidate | Votes | % |
|---|---|---|---|
| Republican | Terry Falk (incumbent) | 4,350 | 74.96% |
| Democratic | Devin Marconi | 1,453 | 25.04% |
| Total votes | | 5,803 | 100% |
| Republican hold | | | |

==== District 11 ====
The new 11th district includes parts of Flathead County and has no incumbent. Republican Ed Byrne won the open seat.

Montana House of Representatives 11th district Republican primary election, 2024
| Party | Candidate | Votes | % |
|---|---|---|---|
| Republican | Ed Byrne | 1,650 | 62.98% |
| Republican | Rob Tracy | 970 | 37.02% |
| Total votes | | 2,620 | 100% |

Montana House of Representatives 11th district general election, 2024
| Party | Candidate | Votes | % |
|---|---|---|---|
| Republican | Ed Byrne | 5,214 | 75.80% |
| Democratic | Jennifer Allen | 1,665 | 24.20% |
| Total votes | | 6,879 | 100% |
| Republican win (new seat) | | | |

==== District 12 ====
The new 12th district includes the homes of incumbent Republican Bob Keenan, who has represented the 10th district since 2023. Keenan didn't seek re-election and fellow Republican Tracy Sharp won the open seat.

Montana House of Representatives 12th district general election, 2024
| Party | Candidate | Votes | % |
|---|---|---|---|
| Republican | Tracy Sharp | 5,117 | 70.83% |
| Democratic | Barry Olson | 2,107 | 29.17% |
| Total votes | | 7,224 | 100% |
| Republican hold | | | |

==== District 13 ====
The new 13th district includes the homes of incumbent Republican Linda Reksten, who has represented the 12th district since 2021.

Montana House of Representatives 13th district general election, 2024
| Party | Candidate | Votes | % |
|---|---|---|---|
| Republican | Linda Reksten (incumbent) | 3,589 | 60.72% |
| Democratic | Shirley Azzopardi | 2,322 | 39.28% |
| Total votes | | 5,911 | 100% |
| Republican hold | | | |

==== District 14 ====
The new 14th district includes the homes of incumbent Republican Paul Fielder, who has represented the 13th district since 2021.

Montana House of Representatives 14th district general election, 2024
| Party | Candidate | Votes | % |
|---|---|---|---|
| Republican | Paul Fielder (incumbent) | 5,133 | 75.01% |
| Democratic | Colleen Hinds | 1,710 | 24.99% |
| Total votes | | 6,843 | 100% |
| Republican hold | | | |

==== District 15 ====
Incumbent Democrat Marvin Weatherwax Jr. has represented the 15th district since 2019. Weatherwax didn't seek re-election and fellow Democrat Thedis Crowe won the open seat.

Montana House of Representatives 15th district general election, 2024
| Party | Candidate | Votes | % |
|---|---|---|---|
| Democratic | Thedis Crowe | 2,087 | 51.84% |
| Republican | Ralph Foster | 1,939 | 48.16% |
| Total votes | | 4,026 | 100% |
| Democratic hold | | | |

==== District 16 ====
Incumbent Democrat Tyson Running Wolf has represented the 16th district since 2019.

Montana House of Representatives 16th district Republican primary election, 2024
| Party | Candidate | Votes | % |
|---|---|---|---|
| Republican | Elaine Utterback Mitchell | 594 | 70.46% |
| Republican | Rolland Heagy | 249 | 29.54% |
| Total votes | | 843 | 100% |

Montana House of Representatives 16th district general election, 2024
| Party | Candidate | Votes | % |
|---|---|---|---|
| Democratic | Tyson Running Wolf (incumbent) | 2,455 | 59.34% |
| Republican | Elaine Utterback Mitchell | 1,682 | 40.66% |
| Total votes | | 4,137 | 100% |
| Democratic hold | | | |

==== District 17 ====
The new 17th district includes the homes of incumbent Republican Ross Fitzgerald, who has represented the 17th district since 2017, and incumbent Republican Zachary Wirth, who has represented the 80th district since 2023. Fitzgerald was term-limited while Wirth was re-elected here.

Montana House of Representatives 17th district general election, 2024
| Party | Candidate | Votes | % |
|---|---|---|---|
| Republican | Zachary Wirth (incumbent) | 4,807 | 75.30% |
| Democratic | Leonard Bates | 1,577 | 24.70% |
| Total votes | | 6,384 | 100% |
| Republican hold | | | |

==== District 18 ====
Incumbent Republican Llew Jones has represented the 18th district since 2019.

Montana House of Representatives 18th district Republican primary election, 2024
| Party | Candidate | Votes | % |
|---|---|---|---|
| Republican | Llew Jones (incumbent) | 1,911 | 71.17% |
| Republican | James Coombs | 774 | 28.83% |
| Total votes | | 2,685 | 100% |

Montana House of Representatives 18th district general election, 2024
| Party | Candidate | Votes | % |
|---|---|---|---|
| Republican | Llew Jones (incumbent) | 3,982 | 73.43% |
| Democratic | David Arends | 1,441 | 26.57% |
| Total votes | | 5,423 | 100% |
| Republican hold | | | |

==== District 19 ====
The new 19th district includes parts of downtown Great Falls and has no incumbent. Democrat Jane Weber won the open seat.

Montana House of Representatives 19th district Republican primary election, 2024
| Party | Candidate | Votes | % |
|---|---|---|---|
| Republican | Hannah Trebas | 432 | 62.16% |
| Republican | Derren Auger | 263 | 37.84% |
| Total votes | | 695 | 100% |

Montana House of Representatives 19th district general election, 2024
| Party | Candidate | Votes | % |
|---|---|---|---|
| Democratic | Jane Weber | 1,798 | 54.67% |
| Republican | Hannah Trebas | 1,491 | 45.33% |
| Total votes | | 3,289 | 100% |
| Democratic win (new seat) | | | |

=== Districts 20–39 ===
==== District 20 ====
The new 20th district includes the homes of incumbent Republican Steven Galloway, who has represented the 24th district since 2021. Galloway lost re-nomination here to Melissa Nikolakakos, who went on to win the general election.

Montana House of Representatives th district Republican primary election, 2024
| Party | Candidate | Votes | % |
|---|---|---|---|
| Republican | Melissa Nikolakakos | 766 | 51.20% |
| Republican | Steven Galloway (incumbent) | 730 | 48.80% |
| Total votes | | 1,496 | 100% |

Montana House of Representatives 20th district general election, 2024
| Party | Candidate | Votes | % |
|---|---|---|---|
| Republican | Melissa Nikolakakos | 2,686 | 53.58% |
| Democratic | Rina Fontana Moore | 2,327 | 46.42% |
| Total votes | | 5,013 | 100% |
| Republican hold | | | |

==== District 21 ====
Incumbent Republican Ed Buttrey has represented the 21st district since 2019.

Montana House of Representatives 21st district Republican primary election, 2024
| Party | Candidate | Votes | % |
|---|---|---|---|
| Republican | Ed Buttrey (incumbent) | 1,327 | 72.59% |
| Republican | James Osterman | 501 | 27.41% |
| Total votes | | 1,828 | 100% |

Montana House of Representatives 21st district general election, 2024
| Party | Candidate | Votes | % |
|---|---|---|---|
| Republican | Ed Buttrey (incumbent) | 3,662 | 67.56% |
| Democratic | Lela Graham | 1,758 | 32.44% |
| Total votes | | 5,420 | 100% |
| Republican hold | | | |

==== District 22 ====
The new 22nd district includes the homes of incumbent Republican George Nikolakakos, who has represented the 26th district since 2023.

Montana House of Representatives 22nd district Republican primary election, 2024
| Party | Candidate | Votes | % |
|---|---|---|---|
| Republican | George Nikolakakos (incumbent) | 687 | 71.94% |
| Republican | James Whitaker | 268 | 28.06% |
| Total votes | | 955 | 100% |

Montana House of Representatives 22nd district general election, 2024
| Party | Candidate | Votes | % |
|---|---|---|---|
| Republican | George Nikolakakos (incumbent) | 2,017 | 61.57% |
| Democratic | Ronald K. Paulick | 1,225 | 37.39% |
| Republican | James Whitaker (write-in) | 34 | 1.04% |
| Total votes | | 3,276 | 100% |
| Republican hold | | | |

==== District 23 ====
The new 23rd district includes the homes of incumbent Republican Eric Tilleman, who has represented the 23rd district since 2024, and incumbent Republican Fred Anderson, who has represented the 20th district since 2017. Anderson was ineligible to run for re-election due to term limits while Tilleman was re-elected here.

Montana House of Representatives 23rd district Republican primary election, 2024
| Party | Candidate | Votes | % |
|---|---|---|---|
| Republican | Eric Tilleman | 822 | 60.98% |
| Republican | Pete Anderson | 293 | 21.74% |
| Republican | John Proud | 185 | 13.72% |
| Republican | Josh Denully | 48 | 3.56% |
| Total votes | | 1,348 | 100% |

Montana House of Representatives 23rd district general election, 2024
| Party | Candidate | Votes | % |
|---|---|---|---|
| Republican | Eric Tilleman (incumbent) | 2,504 | 56.24% |
| Democratic | Sandor R. Hopkins | 1,811 | 40.68% |
| Libertarian | Kevin Leatherbarrow | 137 | 3.08% |
| Total votes | | 4,452 | 100% |
| Republican hold | | | |

==== District 24 ====
The new 24th district includes parts of western Great Falls and has no incumbent. State Senator Steve Fitzpatrick won the open seat.

Montana House of Representatives 24th district general election, 2024
| Party | Candidate | Votes | % |
|---|---|---|---|
| Republican | Steve Fitzpatrick | 4,019 | 100% |
| Total votes | | 4,019 | 100% |
| Republican win (new seat) | | | |

==== District 25 ====
The new 25th district includes the homes of incumbent Republican Steve Gist, who has represented the 25th district since 2021, and incumbent Republican Lola Sheldon-Galloway, who has represented the 22nd district since 2017. Sheldon-Galloway was ineligible to run for re-election due to term limits and she ran for State Senate District 13. Gist was re-elected here.

Montana House of Representatives 25th district general election, 2024
| Party | Candidate | Votes | % |
|---|---|---|---|
| Republican | Steve Gist (incumbent) | 4,088 | 75.34% |
| Democratic | James Rickley | 1,338 | 24.66% |
| Total votes | | 5,426 | 100% |
| Republican hold | | | |

==== District 26 ====
The new 26th district includes the homes of incumbent Republican Russ Miner, who has represented the 19th district since 2023, and incumbent Republican Joshua Kassmier, who has represented the 27th district since 2019. Kassmier ran for State Senate District 13 while Miner was re-elected here.

Montana House of Representatives 26th district Republican primary election, 2024
| Party | Candidate | Votes | % |
|---|---|---|---|
| Republican | Russ Miner (incumbent) | 1,449 | 52.84% |
| Republican | Dana Darlington | 1,293 | 47.16% |
| Total votes | | 2,742 | 100% |

Montana House of Representatives 26th district general election, 2024
| Party | Candidate | Votes | % |
|---|---|---|---|
| Republican | Russ Miner (incumbent) | 5,054 | 100% |
| Total votes | | 5,054 | 100% |
| Republican hold | | | |

==== District 27 ====
The new 27th district includes the home of incumbent Democrat Paul Tuss, who has represented the 28th district since 2023. Former Representative Ed Hill was the Republican nominee.

Montana House of Representatives 27th district general election, 2024
| Party | Candidate | Votes | % |
|---|---|---|---|
| Democratic | Paul Tuss (incumbent) | 2,329 | 52.47% |
| Republican | Ed Hill | 2,110 | 47.53% |
| Total votes | | 4,439 | 100% |
| Democratic hold | | | |

==== District 28 ====
The new 28th district includes the home of incumbent Republican Casey Knudsen, who has represented the 33rd district since 2017. Knudsen was ineligible to run for re-election due to term limits. Republican Eric Albus won the open seat.

Montana House of Representatives 28th district Republican primary election, 2024
| Party | Candidate | Votes | % |
|---|---|---|---|
| Republican | Eric Albus | 1,120 | 40.62% |
| Republican | Mark Wicks | 915 | 33.19% |
| Republican | Wayne Stahl | 722 | 26.19% |
| Total votes | | 2,757 | 100% |

Montana House of Representatives 28th district general election, 2024
| Party | Candidate | Votes | % |
|---|---|---|---|
| Republican | Eric Albus | 4,118 | 77.07% |
| Democratic | Blake Borst | 1,225 | 22.93% |
| Total votes | | 5,343 | 100% |
| Republican hold | | | |

==== District 29 ====
The new 29th district includes the home of incumbent Republican Rhonda Knudsen, who has represented the 34th district since 2019. Knudsen ran for State Senate District 15. Republican Valerie Moore won the open seat.

Montana House of Representatives 29th district Republican primary election, 2024
| Party | Candidate | Votes | % |
|---|---|---|---|
| Republican | Valerie Moore | 2,019 | 68.74% |
| Republican | Miles Knudsen | 918 | 31.26% |
| Total votes | | 2,937 | 100% |

Montana House of Representatives 29th district general election, 2024
| Party | Candidate | Votes | % |
|---|---|---|---|
| Republican | Valerie Moore | 5,026 | 100% |
| Total votes | | 5,026 | 100% |
| Republican hold | | | |

==== District 30 ====
The new 30th district includes parts of Richland County and southern Roosevelt County, such as Sidney, Fairview, and Culbertson. The new district has no incumbent. Republican Morgan Thiel won the open seat.

Montana House of Representatives 30th district general election, 2024
| Party | Candidate | Votes | % |
|---|---|---|---|
| Republican | Morgan Thiel | 4,281 | 100% |
| Total votes | | 4,281 | 100% |
| Republican win (new seat) | | | |

==== District 31 ====
Incumbent Democrat Frank Smith has represented the 31st district since 2021.

Montana House of Representatives 31st district Democratic primary election, 2024
| Party | Candidate | Votes | % |
|---|---|---|---|
| Democratic | Frank Smith (incumbent) | 315 | 61.05% |
| Democratic | Lance Fourstar | 201 | 38.95% |
| Total votes | | 516 | 100% |

Montana House of Representatives 31st district general election, 2024
| Party | Candidate | Votes | % |
|---|---|---|---|
| Democratic | Frank Smith (incumbent) | 2,182 | 59.90% |
| Republican | Kevin Taylor | 1,461 | 40.10% |
| Total votes | | 3,643 | 100% |
| Democratic hold | | | |

==== District 32 ====
Incumbent Democrat Jonathan Windy Boy has represented the 32nd district since 2017. Windy Boy was ineligible to run for re-election due to term limits and ran for State Senate District 16. State Senator Mike Fox won the open seat.

Montana House of Representatives 32nd district general election, 2024
| Party | Candidate | Votes | % |
|---|---|---|---|
| Democratic | Mike Fox | 2,240 | 59.78% |
| Republican | Jason Ulrich | 1,507 | 40.22% |
| Total votes | | 3,747 | 100% |
| Democratic hold | | | |

==== District 33 ====
The new 33rd district includes the homes of incumbent Republican Brandon Ler, who has represented the 35th district since 2021, and incumbent Republican Bob Phalen, who has represented the 36th district since 2021. Phalen ran for State Senate District 17 while Ler was re-elected here.

Montana House of Representatives 33rd district Republican primary election, 2024
| Party | Candidate | Votes | % |
|---|---|---|---|
| Republican | Brandon Ler (incumbent) | 1,586 | 63.14% |
| Republican | Kathy Hoiland | 926 | 36.86% |
| Total votes | | 2,512 | 100% |

Montana House of Representatives 33rd district general election, 2024
| Party | Candidate | Votes | % |
|---|---|---|---|
| Republican | Brandon Ler (incumbent) | 4,576 | 94.56% |
| Republican | Kathy Hoiland (write-in) | 263 | 5.44% |
| Total votes | | 4,839 | 100% |
| Republican hold | | | |

==== District 34 ====
The new 34th district includes the home of incumbent Republican Jerry Schillinger, who has represented the 37th district since 2021.

Montana House of Representatives 34th district general election, 2024
| Party | Candidate | Votes | % |
|---|---|---|---|
| Republican | Jerry Schillinger (incumbent) | 5,554 | 100% |
| Total votes | | 5,554 | 100% |
| Republican hold | | | |

==== District 35 ====
The new 35th district includes the home of incumbent Republican Gary Parry, who has represented the 39th district since 2023.

Montana House of Representatives 35th district general election, 2024
| Party | Candidate | Votes | % |
|---|---|---|---|
| Republican | Gary Parry (incumbent) | 4,780 | 80.69% |
| Democratic | Kim Kreider | 1,144 | 19.31% |
| Total votes | | 5,924 | 100% |
| Republican hold | | | |

==== District 36 ====
The new 36th district includes the home of incumbent Republican Greg Kmetz, who has represented the 38th district since 2023.

Montana House of Representatives 36th district general election, 2024
| Party | Candidate | Votes | % |
|---|---|---|---|
| Republican | Greg Kmetz (incumbent) | 3,558 | 70.08% |
| Democratic | Stan Taylor | 1,519 | 29.92% |
| Total votes | | 5,077 | 100% |
| Republican hold | | | |

==== District 37 ====
The new 37th district includes the homes of incumbent Republican Edward Butcher, who has represented the 29th district since 2023. Butcher didn't seek re-election. Republican Shane Klakken won the open seat.

Montana House of Representatives 37th district general election, 2024
| Party | Candidate | Votes | % |
|---|---|---|---|
| Republican | Shane Klakken | 4,684 | 74.37% |
| Democratic | Andrea Payne | 1,614 | 25.63% |
| Total votes | | 6,298 | 100% |
| Republican hold | | | |

==== District 38 ====
The new 38th district includes the home of incumbent Republican Greg Oblander, who has represented the 40th district since 2023.

Montana House of Representatives 38th district Republican primary election, 2024
| Party | Candidate | Votes | % |
|---|---|---|---|
| Republican | Greg Oblander (incumbent) | 2,288 | 82.12% |
| Republican | Nancy Kemler | 498 | 17.88% |
| Total votes | | 2,786 | 100% |

Montana House of Representatives 38th district general election, 2024
| Party | Candidate | Votes | % |
|---|---|---|---|
| Republican | Greg Oblander (incumbent) | 5,894 | 100% |
| Total votes | | 5,894 | 100% |
| Republican hold | | | |

==== District 39 ====
The new 39th district includes the home of incumbent Republican Kerri Seekins-Crowe, who has represented the 43rd district since 2021.

Montana House of Representatives 39th district general election, 2024
| Party | Candidate | Votes | % |
|---|---|---|---|
| Republican | Kerri Seekins-Crowe (incumbent) | 3,151 | 65.99% |
| Democratic | Melissa Smith | 1,624 | 34.01% |
| Total votes | | 4,775 | 100% |
| Republican hold | | | |

=== Districts 40–59 ===
==== District 40 ====
The new 40th district includes the home of incumbent Republican Sue Vinton, who has represented the 56th district since 2017. Vinton was ineligible for re-election due to term limits ran for State Senate District 20. Republican Mike Vinton was elected to the open seat.

Montana House of Representatives 40th district Republican primary election, 2024
| Party | Candidate | Votes | % |
|---|---|---|---|
| Republican | Mike Vinton | 1,197 | 66.57% |
| Republican | Josh Visocan | 601 | 33.43% |
| Total votes | | 1,798 | 100% |

Montana House of Representatives 40th district general election, 2024
| Party | Candidate | Votes | % |
|---|---|---|---|
| Republican | Mike Vinton | 3,679 | 74.47% |
| Democratic | Bob Auch | 1,261 | 25.53% |
| Total votes | | 4,940 | 100% |
| Republican hold | | | |

==== District 41 ====
Incumbent Republican Gayle Lammers has represented the 41st district since 2024. Lammers ran for State Senate District 21. Democrat Jade Sooktis won the open seat.

Montana House of Representatives 41st district general election, 2024
| Party | Candidate | Votes | % |
|---|---|---|---|
| Democratic | Jade Sooktis | 1,839 | 63.81% |
| Republican | Dean Wallowing Bull | 1,042 | 36.16% |
| Democratic | Rae Peppers (write-in) | 1 | 0.03% |
| Total votes | | 2,882 | 100% |
| Democratic gain from Republican | | | |

==== District 42 ====
Incumbent Democrat Sharon Stewart-Peregoy has represented the 42nd district since 2017. Stewart-Peregoy was ineligible for re-election due to term limits and ran for State Senate District 21, but lost. Fellow Democrat Sidney Fitzpatrick won the open seat.

Montana House of Representatives 42nd district general election, 2024
| Party | Candidate | Votes | % |
|---|---|---|---|
| Democratic | Sidney Fitzpatrick | 1,922 | 52.56% |
| Republican | Bill Hodges | 1,735 | 47.44% |
| Total votes | | 3,657 | 100% |
| Democratic hold | | | |

==== District 43 ====
The new 43rd district includes the home of incumbent Republican Larry Brewster, who has represented the 44th district since 2020.

Montana House of Representatives 43rd district general election, 2024
| Party | Candidate | Votes | % |
|---|---|---|---|
| Republican | Larry Brewster (incumbent) | 2,965 | 64.26% |
| Democratic | Alexander Clark | 1,649 | 35.74% |
| Total votes | | 4,614 | 100% |
| Republican hold | | | |

==== District 44 ====
The new 44th district includes the home of incumbent Republican Katie Zolnikov, who has represented the 45th district since 2021.

Montana House of Representatives 44th district general election, 2024
| Party | Candidate | Votes | % |
|---|---|---|---|
| Republican | Katie Zolnikov (incumbent) | 4,508 | 100% |
| Total votes | | 4,508 | 100% |
| Republican hold | | | |

==== District 45 ====
The new 45th district includes the home of incumbent Democrat Denise Baum, who has represented the 47th district since 2023.

Montana House of Representatives 45th district general election, 2024
| Party | Candidate | Votes | % |
|---|---|---|---|
| Democratic | Denise Baum (incumbent) | 2,603 | 52.94% |
| Republican | Kassidy Olson | 2,314 | 47.06% |
| Total votes | | 4,917 | 100% |
| Democratic hold | | | |

==== District 46 ====
The new 46th district includes the home of incumbent Democrat Emma Kerr-Carpenter, who has represented the 49th district since 2018.

Montana House of Representatives 46th district general election, 2024
| Party | Candidate | Votes | % |
|---|---|---|---|
| Democratic | Emma Kerr-Carpenter (incumbent) | 2,507 | 52.91% |
| Republican | Starr Emery | 2,231 | 47.09% |
| Total votes | | 4,738 | 100% |
| Democratic hold | | | |

==== District 47 ====
The new 47th district includes the home of incumbent Republican Naarah Hastings, who has represented the 50th district since 2023. Hastings didn't seek re-election and Democrat James Reavis won the open seat.

Montana House of Representatives 47th district Republican primary election, 2024
| Party | Candidate | Votes | % |
|---|---|---|---|
| Republican | Stephanie Moncada | 346 | 52.34% |
| Republican | Thomas Mahon | 315 | 47.66% |
| Total votes | | 661 | 100% |

Montana House of Representatives 47th district general election, 2024
| Party | Candidate | Votes | % |
|---|---|---|---|
| Democratic | James Reavis | 1,819 | 52.88% |
| Republican | Stephanie Moncada | 1,621 | 47.12% |
| Total votes | | 3,440 | 100% |
| Democratic gain from Republican | | | |

==== District 48 ====
The new 48th district includes the home of incumbent Republican Mike Yakawich, who has represented the 51st district since 2022. Yakawich ran for State Senate District 24. Republican Curtis Schomer won the open seat.

Montana House of Representatives 48th district general election, 2024
| Party | Candidate | Votes | % |
|---|---|---|---|
| Republican | Curtis Schomer | 2,565 | 57.14% |
| Democratic | Anne Ross | 1,924 | 42.86% |
| Total votes | | 4,489 | 100% |
| Republican hold | | | |

==== District 49 ====
The new 49th district includes the home of incumbent Republican Sherry Essmann, who has represented the 52nd district since 2021.

Montana House of Representatives 49th district general election, 2024
| Party | Candidate | Votes | % |
|---|---|---|---|
| Republican | Sherry Essmann (incumbent) | 3,063 | 62.46% |
| Democratic | Rudolf Haden | 1,841 | 37.54% |
| Total votes | | 4,904 | 100% |
| Republican hold | | | |

==== District 50 ====
The new 50th district includes the home of incumbent Republican Terry Moore, who has represented the 54th district since 2019. Moore didn't seek re-election. Republican Anthony Nicastro won the open seat.

Montana House of Representatives 50th district general election, 2024
| Party | Candidate | Votes | % |
|---|---|---|---|
| Republican | Anthony Nicastro | 4,019 | 66.19% |
| Democratic | Shawn C. Giesick | 2,053 | 33.81% |
| Total votes | | 6,072 | 100% |
| Republican hold | | | |

==== District 51 ====
The new 51st district includes the home of incumbent Republican Jodee Etchart, who has represented the 48th district since 2023.

Montana House of Representatives 51st district general election, 2024
| Party | Candidate | Votes | % |
|---|---|---|---|
| Republican | Jodee Etchart (incumbent) | 3,124 | 57.38% |
| Nonpartisan | Janna Hafer | 2,320 | 42.62% |
| Total votes | | 5,444 | 100% |
| Republican hold | | | |

==== District 52 ====
The new 52nd district includes the home of incumbent Republican Bill Mercer, who has represented the 46th district since 2019.

Montana House of Representatives 52nd district general election, 2024
| Party | Candidate | Votes | % |
|---|---|---|---|
| Republican | Bill Mercer (incumbent) | 4,522 | 67.65% |
| Democratic | Carole Boerner | 2,162 | 32.35% |
| Total votes | | 6,684 | 100% |
| Republican hold | | | |

==== District 53 ====
Incumbent Republican Nelly Nicol has represented the 53rd district since 2023.

Montana House of Representatives 53rd district Republican primary election, 2024
| Party | Candidate | Votes | % |
|---|---|---|---|
| Republican | Nelly Nicol (incumbent) | 1,174 | 52.43% |
| Republican | David Austin | 1,065 | 47.57% |
| Total votes | | 2,239 | 100% |

Montana House of Representatives 53rd district general election, 2024
| Party | Candidate | Votes | % |
|---|---|---|---|
| Republican | Nelly Nicol (incumbent) | 4,838 | 75.90% |
| Democratic | Ellie Kerns | 1,536 | 24.10% |
| Total votes | | 6,374 | 100% |
| Republican hold | | | |

==== District 54 ====
The new 54th district includes the home of incumbent Republican Lee Deming, who has represented the 55th district since 2023.

Montana House of Representatives 54th district general election, 2024
| Party | Candidate | Votes | % |
|---|---|---|---|
| Republican | Lee Deming (incumbent) | 4,247 | 66.23% |
| Total votes | | 4,247 | 100% |
| Republican hold | | | |

==== District 55 ====
The new 55th district includes the home of incumbent Republican Brad Barker, who has represented the 58th district since 2023. Former Representative and State Senator Kim Gillan was the Democratic nominee.

Montana House of Representatives 55th district Republican primary election, 2024
| Party | Candidate | Votes | % |
|---|---|---|---|
| Republican | Brad Barker (incumbent) | 1,527 | 52.12% |
| Republican | Mary Horman | 736 | 25.12% |
| Republican | Lisa Bennett | 667 | 22.76% |
| Total votes | | 2,930 | 100% |

Montana House of Representatives 55th district general election, 2024
| Party | Candidate | Votes | % |
|---|---|---|---|
| Republican | Brad Barker (incumbent) | 4,931 | 65.95% |
| Democratic | Kim Gillan | 2,546 | 34.05% |
| Total votes | | 7,477 | 100% |
| Republican hold | | | |

==== District 56 ====
The new 56th district includes the home of incumbent Republican Fiona Nave, who has represented the 57th district since 2021.

Montana House of Representatives 56th district general election, 2024
| Party | Candidate | Votes | % |
|---|---|---|---|
| Republican | Fiona Nave (incumbent) | 6,005 | 100% |
| Total votes | | 6,005 | 100% |
| Republican hold | | | |

==== District 57 ====
The new 57th district includes the home of incumbent Republican Marty Malone, who has represented the 59th district since 2021. Malone lost re-election here to Democrat Scott Rosenzweig.

(Note: Republican candidate Marty Malone raised enough money for a recount, but the recount result upheld Scott Rosenzweig's victory. The original tally was 3,803 votes for Rosenzweig and 3,783 for Malone.)

Montana House of Representatives 57th district general election, 2024
| Party | Candidate | Votes | % |
|---|---|---|---|
| Democratic | Scott Rosenzweig | 3,802 | 50.11% |
| Republican | Marty Malone (incumbent) | 3,785 | 49.89% |
| Total votes | | 7,587 | 100% |
| Democratic gain from Republican | | | |

==== District 58 ====
The new 58th district includes the home of incumbent Democrat Laurie Bishop, who has represented the 60th district since 2017. Bishop was ineligible to run for re-election due to term limits. Democrat Jamie Isaly won the open seat.

Montana House of Representatives 58th district Demoratic primary election, 2024
| Party | Candidate | Votes | % |
|---|---|---|---|
| Democratic | Jamie Isaly | 1,374 | 91.11% |
| Democratic | Dean Williamson | 134 | 8.89% |
| Total votes | | 1,508 | 100% |

Montana House of Representatives 58th district general election, 2024
| Party | Candidate | Votes | % |
|---|---|---|---|
| Democratic | Jamie Isaly | 3,690 | 53.59% |
| Republican | Jason Gunderson | 3,196 | 46.41% |
| Total votes | | 6,886 | 100% |
| Democratic hold | | | |

==== District 59 ====
The new 59th district includes the homes of incumbent Democrat Ed Stafman, who has represented the 62nd district since 2021, and incumbent Democrat Jim Hamilton, who had represented the 61st district since 2017. Hamilton was ineligible to run for re-election due to term limits while Stafman was re-elected here.

Montana House of Representatives 59th district general election, 2024
| Party | Candidate | Votes | % |
|---|---|---|---|
| Democratic | Ed Stafman (incumbent) | 4,851 | 62.82% |
| Republican | Marc Greendorfer | 2,871 | 37.18% |
| Total votes | | 7,722 | 100% |
| Democratic hold | | | |

=== Districts 60–79 ===
==== District 60 ====
The new 60th district includes parts of southern Gallatin County, such as West Yellowstone and Big Sky. The new district has no incumbent. Democrat Alanah Griffith won the open seat.

Montana House of Representatives 60th district general election, 2024
| Party | Candidate | Votes | % |
|---|---|---|---|
| Democratic | Alanah Griffith | 3,338 | 52.16% |
| Republican | Jerry Johnson | 3,062 | 47.84% |
| Total votes | | 6,400 | 100% |
| Democratic win (new seat) | | | |

==== District 61 ====
The new 61st district includes the home of incumbent Democrat Alice Buckley, who has represented the 63rd district since 2021. Buckley didn't seek re-election. Democrat Becky Edwards won the open seat.

Montana House of Representatives 61st district general election, 2024
| Party | Candidate | Votes | % |
|---|---|---|---|
| Democratic | Becky Edwards | 2,695 | 71.35% |
| Republican | Thomas Carlson | 1,082 | 28.65% |
| Total votes | | 3,777 | 100% |
| Democratic hold | | | |

==== District 62 ====
The new 62nd district includes parts of southwestern Bozeman and has no incumbent. Democrat Josh Seckinger won the open seat.

Montana House of Representatives 62nd district Republican primary election, 2024
| Party | Candidate | Votes | % |
|---|---|---|---|
| Democratic | Josh Seckinger | 504 | 52.94% |
| Democratic | Rio Roland | 448 | 47.06% |
| Total votes | | 952 | 100% |

Montana House of Representatives 62nd district general election, 2024
| Party | Candidate | Votes | % |
|---|---|---|---|
| Democratic | Josh Seckinger | 2,926 | 51.06% |
| Republican | Owen Lang | 2,804 | 48.94% |
| Total votes | | 5,730 | 100% |
| Democratic win (new seat) | | | |

==== District 63 ====
The new 63rd district includes parts of northwestern Bozeman and has no incumbent. Democrat Peter Strand won the open seat.

Montana House of Representatives 63rd district Democratic primary election, 2024
| Party | Candidate | Votes | % |
|---|---|---|---|
| Democratic | Peter Strand | 818 | 79.19% |
| Democratic | John Hansen | 215 | 20.81% |
| Total votes | | 1,033 | 100% |

Montana House of Representatives 63rd district Republican primary election, 2024
| Party | Candidate | Votes | % |
|---|---|---|---|
| Republican | Mark Lewis | 534 | 66.92% |
| Republican | Joe Flynn | 264 | 33.08% |
| Total votes | | 798 | 100% |

Montana House of Representatives 63rd district general election, 2024
| Party | Candidate | Votes | % |
|---|---|---|---|
| Democratic | Peter Strand | 3,255 | 53.42% |
| Republican | Mark Lewis | 2,838 | 46.58% |
| Total votes | | 6,093 | 100% |
| Democratic win (new seat) | | | |

==== District 64 ====
The new 64th district includes the home of incumbent Democrat Kelly Kortum, who has represented the 65th district since 2021.

Montana House of Representatives 64th district general election, 2024
| Party | Candidate | Votes | % |
|---|---|---|---|
| Democratic | Kelly Kortum (incumbent) | 3,177 | 54.31% |
| Republican | Jolene Crum | 2,673 | 45.69% |
| Total votes | | 5,850 | 100% |
| Democratic hold | | | |

==== District 65 ====
The new 65th district includes parts of downtown and northeastern Bozeman as well as Springhill and has no incumbent. Democrat Brian Close won the open seat.

Montana House of Representatives 65th district Democratic primary election, 2024
| Party | Candidate | Votes | % |
|---|---|---|---|
| Democratic | Brian Close | 860 | 61.30% |
| Democratic | Anja Wookey-Huffman | 543 | 38.70% |
| Total votes | | 1,403 | 100% |

Montana House of Representatives 65th district general election, 2024
| Party | Candidate | Votes | % |
|---|---|---|---|
| Democratic | Brian Close | 3,456 | 55.72% |
| Republican | Esther Fishbaugh | 2,746 | 44.28% |
| Total votes | | 6,202 | 100% |
| Democratic win (new seat) | | | |

==== District 66 ====
Incumbent Democrat Eric Matthews has represented the 66th district since 2023.

Montana House of Representatives 66th district general election, 2024
| Party | Candidate | Votes | % |
|---|---|---|---|
| Democratic | Eric Matthews (incumbent) | 4,009 | 56.74% |
| Republican | Marla Davis | 3,057 | 43.26% |
| Total votes | | 7,066 | 100% |
| Democratic hold | | | |

==== District 67 ====
Incumbent Republican Jedediah Hinkle has represented the 67th district since 2021.

Montana House of Representatives 67th district general election, 2024
| Party | Candidate | Votes | % |
|---|---|---|---|
| Republican | Jedediah Hinkle (incumbent) | 3,757 | 63.39% |
| Democratic | Carl Anderson | 2,170 | 36.61% |
| Total votes | | 5,927 | 100% |
| Republican hold | | | |

==== District 68 ====
The new 68th district includes the homes of incumbent Republican Caleb Hinkle, who has represented the 68th district since 2021, and incumbent Republican Jennifer Carlson, who has represented the 69th district since 2021. Hinkle defeated Carlson for the Republican nomination and went on to win the general election.

Montana House of Representatives 68th district Republican primary election, 2024
| Party | Candidate | Votes | % |
|---|---|---|---|
| Republican | Caleb Hinkle (incumbent) | 1,001 | 49.24% |
| Republican | Jennifer Carlson (incumbent) | 699 | 34.38% |
| Republican | Scott Sales | 333 | 16.38% |
| Total votes | | 2,033 | 100% |

Montana House of Representatives 68th district general election, 2024
| Party | Candidate | Votes | % |
|---|---|---|---|
| Republican | Caleb Hinkle (incumbent) | 4,283 | 74.06% |
| Democratic | Alexander Colafrancesco | 1,500 | 25.94% |
| Total votes | | 5,783 | 100% |
| Republican hold | | | |

==== District 69 ====
The new 69th district includes the home of incumbent Republican Ken Walsh, who has represented the 71st district since 2021.

Montana House of Representatives 69th district general election, 2024
| Party | Candidate | Votes | % |
|---|---|---|---|
| Republican | Ken Walsh (incumbent) | 6,222 | 100% |
| Total votes | | 6,222 | 100% |
| Republican hold | | | |

==== District 70 ====
The new 70th district includes the home of incumbent Republican Tom Welch, who has represented the 72nd district since 2017. Welch was ineligible to run for re-election due to term limits. Republican Shannon Maness won the open seat.

Montana House of Representatives 70th district Republican primary election, 2024
| Party | Candidate | Votes | % |
|---|---|---|---|
| Republican | Shannon Maness | 1,465 | 49.01% |
| Republican | Mary Ann Nicholas | 1,157 | 38.71% |
| Republican | Mike Klakken | 367 | 12.28% |
| Total votes | | 2,989 | 100% |

Montana House of Representatives 70th district general election, 2024
| Party | Candidate | Votes | % |
|---|---|---|---|
| Republican | Shannon Maness | 5,384 | 100% |
| Total votes | | 5,384 | 100% |
| Republican hold | | | |

==== District 71 ====
The new 71st district includes most of Deer Lodge County as well as parts of northern Silver Bow County. The district has no incumbent. Democrat Scott DeMarois won the open seat.

Montana House of Representatives 71st district general election, 2024
| Party | Candidate | Votes | % |
|---|---|---|---|
| Democratic | Scott DeMarois | 3,375 | 61.84% |
| Republican | H. Steiger | 2,083 | 38.16% |
| Total votes | | 5,458 | 100% |
| Democratic win (new seat) | | | |

==== District 72 ====
The new 72nd district includes the home of incumbent Democrat Donavon Hawk, who has represented the 76th district since 2021.

Montana House of Representatives 72nd district general election, 2024
| Party | Candidate | Votes | % |
|---|---|---|---|
| Democratic | Donavon Hawk (incumbent) | 3,081 | 62.37% |
| Republican | Andy Johnson | 1,859 | 37.63% |
| Total votes | | 4,940 | 100% |
| Democratic hold | | | |

==== District 73 ====
The new 73rd district includes the homes of incumbent Democrat Jennifer Lynch, who has represented the 73rd district since 2023, and incumbent Democrat Derek Harvey, who has represented the 74th district since 2019. Harvey retired to run for State Senate District 37 while Lynch was re-elected here.

Montana House of Representatives 73rd district general election, 2024
| Party | Candidate | Votes | % |
|---|---|---|---|
| Democratic | Jennifer Lynch (incumbent) | 2,766 | 61.71% |
| Republican | Zach Tomaszewski | 1,716 | 38.29% |
| Total votes | | 4,482 | 100% |
| Democratic hold | | | |

==== District 74 ====
The new 74th district includes parts of eastern Silver Bow County and has no incumbent. Democrat Marc Lee won the open seat.

Montana House of Representatives 74th district general election, 2024
| Party | Candidate | Votes | % |
|---|---|---|---|
| Democratic | Marc Lee | 3,744 | 61.30% |
| Republican | Trenin Bayless | 2,364 | 38.70% |
| Total votes | | 6,108 | 100% |
| Democratic win (new seat) | | | |

==== District 75 ====
Incumbent Republican Marta Bertoglio has represented the 75th district since 2021.

Montana House of Representatives 75th district general election, 2024
| Party | Candidate | Votes | % |
|---|---|---|---|
| Republican | Marta Bertoglio (incumbent) | 5,166 | 71.13% |
| Democratic | Nancy Jane Lien | 2,097 | 28.87% |
| Total votes | | 7,263 | 100% |
| Republican hold | | | |

==== District 76 ====
The new 76th district includes the homes of incumbent Republican John Fitzpatrick, who has represented the 77th district since 2023, and incumbent Republican Gregory Frazer, who has represented the 78th district since 2021. Frazer retired to run for State Senate District 38 while Fitzpatrick was re-elected here.

Montana House of Representatives 76th district Republican primary election, 2024
| Party | Candidate | Votes | % |
|---|---|---|---|
| Republican | John Fitzpatrick (incumbent) | 1,466 | 51.71% |
| Republican | Dave Kessler III | 1,369 | 48.29% |
| Total votes | | 2,835 | 100% |

Montana House of Representatives 76th district general election, 2024
| Party | Candidate | Votes | % |
|---|---|---|---|
| Republican | John Fitzpatrick (incumbent) | 4,957 | 78.46% |
| Libertarian | Elena Gagliano | 1,361 | 21.54% |
| Total votes | | 6,318 | 100% |
| Republican hold | | | |

==== District 77 ====
The new 77th district includes the home of incumbent Republican Jane Gillette, who has represented the 64th district since 2021.

Montana House of Representatives 77th district Republican primary election, 2024
| Party | Candidate | Votes | % |
|---|---|---|---|
| Republican | Jane Gillette (incumbent) | 1,565 | 50.98% |
| Republican | Kyle McMurray | 1,505 | 49.02% |
| Total votes | | 3,070 | 100% |

Montana House of Representatives 77th district general election, 2024
| Party | Candidate | Votes | % |
|---|---|---|---|
| Republican | Jane Gillette (incumbent) | 5,458 | 78.53% |
| Democratic | Jeremiah Dawson | 1,492 | 21.47% |
| Total votes | | 6,950 | 100% |
| Republican hold | | | |

==== District 78 ====
The new 78th district includes the homes of incumbent Republican James Bergstrom, who has represented the 30th district since 2023. Bergstrom lost re-nomination to Republican Randyn Gregg, who went on to win the general election.

Montana House of Representatives 78th district Republican primary election, 2024
| Party | Candidate | Votes | % |
|---|---|---|---|
| Republican | Randyn Gregg | 1,581 | 52.86% |
| Republican | James Bergstrom (incumbent) | 1,410 | 47.14% |
| Total votes | | 2,991 | 100% |

Montana House of Representatives 78th district general election, 2024
| Party | Candidate | Votes | % |
|---|---|---|---|
| Republican | Randyn Gregg | 4,877 | 78.23% |
| Democratic | Glenn Lambert | 1,357 | 21.77% |
| Total votes | | 6,234 | 100% |
| Republican hold | | | |

==== District 79 ====
Incumbent Democrat Laura Smith has represented the 79th district since 2023. Smith retired to run for State Senate District 40 and fellow Democrat Luke Muszkiewicz won the open seat.

Montana House of Representatives 79th district Democratic primary election, 2024
| Party | Candidate | Votes | % |
|---|---|---|---|
| Democratic | Luke Muszkiewicz | 1,217 | 56.87% |
| Democratic | Emily Harris | 786 | 36.73% |
| Democratic | Anne Woodland | 137 | 6.40% |
| Total votes | | 2,140 | 100% |

Montana House of Representatives 79th district Republican primary election, 2024
| Party | Candidate | Votes | % |
|---|---|---|---|
| Republican | Jill Sark | 1,026 | 66.07% |
| Republican | Demetri Joslin | 527 | 33.93% |
| Total votes | | 1,553 | 100% |

Montana House of Representatives 79th district general election, 2024
| Party | Candidate | Votes | % |
|---|---|---|---|
| Democratic | Luke Muszkiewicz | 3,678 | 53.52% |
| Republican | Jill Sark | 3,194 | 46.48% |
| Total votes | | 6,872 | 100% |
| Democratic hold | | | |

=== Districts 80–100 ===
==== District 80 ====
The new 80th district includes the home of incumbent Democrat Melissa Romano, who has represented the 81st district since 2023.

Montana House of Representatives 80th district general election, 2024
| Party | Candidate | Votes | % |
|---|---|---|---|
| Democratic | Melissa Romano (incumbent) | 2,937 | 53.82% |
| Republican | Rachel Burright | 2,520 | 46.18% |
| Total votes | | 5,457 | 100% |
| Democratic hold | | | |

==== District 81 ====
The new 81st district includes the home of incumbent Democrat Mary Caferro, who has represented the 82nd district since 2023.

Montana House of Representatives 81st district general election, 2024
| Party | Candidate | Votes | % |
|---|---|---|---|
| Democratic | Mary Caferro (incumbent) | 3,498 | 55.53% |
| Republican | Dustin Scott | 2,801 | 44.47% |
| Total votes | | 6,299 | 100% |
| Democratic hold | | | |

==== District 82 ====
The new 82nd district includes the home of incumbent Democrat and House Minority Leader Kim Abbott, who has represented the 83rd district since 2017. Abbott was ineligible to run for re-election due to term limits. Democrat Pete Elverum won the open seat.

Montana House of Representatives 82nd district Democratic primary election, 2024
| Party | Candidate | Votes | % |
|---|---|---|---|
| Democratic | Pete Elverum | 926 | 53.99% |
| Democratic | SK Rossi | 789 | 46.01% |
| Total votes | | 1,715 | 100% |

Montana House of Representatives 82nd district general election, 2024
| Party | Candidate | Votes | % |
|---|---|---|---|
| Democratic | Pete Elverum | 2,990 | 54.87% |
| Republican | John Looney Sr. | 2,459 | 45.13% |
| Total votes | | 5,449 | 100% |
| Democratic hold | | | |

==== District 83 ====
The new 83rd district includes the home of incumbent Democrat Jill Cohenour, who has represented the 84th district since 2023.

Montana House of Representatives 83rd district Republican primary election, 2024
| Party | Candidate | Votes | % |
|---|---|---|---|
| Republican | Wes Feist | 826 | 65.82% |
| Republican | Christopher St. Jean | 429 | 34.18% |
| Total votes | | 1,255 | 100% |

Montana House of Representatives 83rd district general election, 2024
| Party | Candidate | Votes | % |
|---|---|---|---|
| Democratic | Jill Cohenour (incumbent) | 3,549 | 55.64% |
| Republican | Wes Feist | 2,830 | 44.36% |
| Total votes | | 6,379 | 100% |
| Democratic hold | | | |

==== District 84 ====
The new 84th district includes the home of incumbent Republican Julie Dooling, who has represented the 70th district since 2019.

Montana House of Representatives 84th district Democratic primary election, 2024
| Party | Candidate | Votes | % |
|---|---|---|---|
| Democratic | Michele Crepeau | 816 | 80.71% |
| Democratic | David Williams | 195 | 19.29% |
| Total votes | | 1,011 | 100% |

Montana House of Representatives 84th district Republican primary election, 2024
| Party | Candidate | Votes | % |
|---|---|---|---|
| Republican | Julie Dooling (incumbent) | 1,903 | 78.41% |
| Republican | Jon Jackson | 524 | 21.59% |
| Total votes | | 2,427 | 100% |

Montana House of Representatives 84th district general election, 2024
| Party | Candidate | Votes | % |
|---|---|---|---|
| Republican | Julie Dooling (incumbent) | 4,770 | 67.35% |
| Democratic | Michele Crepeau | 2,312 | 32.65% |
| Total votes | | 7,082 | 100% |
| Republican hold | | | |

==== District 85 ====
Incumbent Republican Michele Binkley has represented the 85th district since 2021. She lost re-nomination in the Republican primary to Kathy Love, who went on to win the general election.

Montana House of Representatives 85th district Republican primary election, 2024
| Party | Candidate | Votes | % |
|---|---|---|---|
| Republican | Kathy Love | 1,636 | 52.81% |
| Republican | Michele Binkley (incumbent) | 1,462 | 47.19% |
| Total votes | | 3,098 | 100% |

Montana House of Representatives 85th district general election, 2024
| Party | Candidate | Votes | % |
|---|---|---|---|
| Republican | Kathy Love | 5,716 | 77.16% |
| Democratic | Laura Mae Jackson | 1,692 | 22.84% |
| Total votes | | 7,408 | 100% |
| Republican hold | | | |

==== District 86 ====
Incumbent Republican David Bedey has represented the 86th district since 2019.

Montana House of Representatives 86th district Republican primary election, 2024
| Party | Candidate | Votes | % |
|---|---|---|---|
| Republican | David Bedey (incumbent) | 1,883 | 75.50% |
| Republican | Robert Wallace | 611 | 24.50% |
| Total votes | | 2,494 | 100% |

Montana House of Representatives 86th district general election, 2024
| Party | Candidate | Votes | % |
|---|---|---|---|
| Republican | David Bedey (incumbent) | 4,798 | 71.73% |
| Democratic | Jeff Kempka | 1,891 | 28.27% |
| Total votes | | 6,689 | 100% |
| Republican hold | | | |

==== District 87 ====
Incumbent Republican Ron Marshall has represented the 87th district since 2021.

Montana House of Representatives 87th district general election, 2024
| Party | Candidate | Votes | % |
|---|---|---|---|
| Republican | Ron Marshall (incumbent) | 5,457 | 74.72% |
| Democratic | Tammie Milligan | 1,846 | 25.28% |
| Total votes | | 7,303 | 100% |
| Republican hold | | | |

==== District 88 ====
Incumbent Republican Wayne Rusk has represented the 88th district since 2023. Rusk ran for State Senate District 44. Republican Greg Overstreet won the open seat.

Montana House of Representatives 88th district Republican primary election, 2024
| Party | Candidate | Votes | % |
|---|---|---|---|
| Republican | Greg Overstreet | 1,571 | 54.19% |
| Republican | Kim Dailey | 1,328 | 45.81% |
| Total votes | | 2,899 | 100% |

Montana House of Representatives 88th district general election, 2024
| Party | Candidate | Votes | % |
|---|---|---|---|
| Republican | Greg Overstreet | 5,086 | 69.97% |
| Democratic | Evan Schroedel | 2,183 | 30.03% |
| Total votes | | 7,269 | 100% |
| Republican hold | | | |

==== District 89 ====
The new 89th district includes the homes of incumbent Democrat Mark Thane, who has represented the 99th district since 2021, and incumbent Republican Lyn Hellegaard, who has represented the 97th district since 2023. Thane defeated Hellegaard in the general election.

Montana House of Representatives 89th district general election, 2024
| Party | Candidate | Votes | % |
|---|---|---|---|
| Democratic | Mark Thane (incumbent) | 3,590 | 55.59% |
| Republican | Lyn Hellegaard (incumbent) | 2,868 | 44.41% |
| Total votes | | 6,458 | 100% |
| Democratic hold | | | |

==== District 90 ====
The new 90th district includes the home of incumbent Republican Denley Loge, who has represented the 14th district since 2017. Loge was ineligible to run for re-election due to term limits and ran for State Senate District 45. Republican Curtis Cochran won the open seat.

Montana House of Representatives 90th district Republican primary election, 2024
| Party | Candidate | Votes | % |
|---|---|---|---|
| Republican | Curtis Cochran | 1,034 | 38.68% |
| Republican | Jeff Stanek | 907 | 33.93% |
| Republican | Steven Delisle | 732 | 27.38% |
| Total votes | | 2,673 | 100% |

Montana House of Representatives 90th district general election, 2024
| Party | Candidate | Votes | % |
|---|---|---|---|
| Republican | Curtis Cochran | 5,381 | 100% |
| Total votes | | 5,381 | 100% |
| Republican hold | | | |

==== District 91 ====
The new 91st district includes the home of incumbent Republican Joe Read, who has represented the 93rd district since 2019. Read didn't seek re-election. Democrat Shelly Fyant won the open seat.

Montana House of Representatives 91st district general election, 2024
| Party | Candidate | Votes | % |
|---|---|---|---|
| Democratic | Shelly Fyant | 3,249 | 54.20% |
| Republican | David Passieri | 2,745 | 45.80% |
| Total votes | | 5,994 | 100% |
| Democratic gain from Republican | | | |

==== District 92 ====
The new 92nd district includes the homes of incumbent Republican Mike Hopkins, who has represented the 92nd district since 2017, and incumbent Democrat Connie Keogh, who has represented the 91st district since 2019. Hopkins was ineligible to run for re-election due to term limits while Keogh was re-elected here.

Montana House of Representatives 92nd district general election, 2024
| Party | Candidate | Votes | % |
|---|---|---|---|
| Democratic | Connie Keogh (incumbent) | 4,059 | 61.07% |
| Republican | Ted Morgan | 2,587 | 38.93% |
| Total votes | | 6,646 | 100% |
| Democratic hold | | | |

==== District 93 ====
The new 93rd district includes the home of incumbent Democrat Katie Sullivan, who has represented the 89th district since 2019.

Montana House of Representatives 93rd district general election, 2024
| Party | Candidate | Votes | % |
|---|---|---|---|
| Democratic | Katie Sullivan (incumbent) | 4,024 | 61.95% |
| Republican | Roy Handley | 2,472 | 38.05% |
| Total votes | | 6,496 | 100% |
| Democratic hold | | | |

==== District 94 ====
The new 94th district includes the home of incumbent Democrat Marilyn Marler, who has represented the 90th district since 2019.

Montana House of Representatives 94th district general election, 2024
| Party | Candidate | Votes | % |
|---|---|---|---|
| Democratic | Marilyn Marler (incumbent) | 4,076 | 58.88% |
| Republican | Adam Henson | 2,846 | 41.12% |
| Total votes | | 6,922 | 100% |
| Democratic hold | | | |

==== District 95 ====
The new 95th district includes the home of incumbent Democrat Zooey Zephyr, who has represented the 100th district since 2023.

Montana House of Representatives 95th district general election, 2024
| Party | Candidate | Votes | % |
|---|---|---|---|
| Democratic | Zooey Zephyr (incumbent) | 5,189 | 79.86% |
| Republican | Barbara Starmer | 1,309 | 20.14% |
| Total votes | | 6,498 | 100% |
| Democratic hold | | | |

==== District 96 ====
The new 96th district includes the home of incumbent Democrat Bob Carter, who has represented the 98th district since 2023.

Montana House of Representatives 96th district general election, 2024
| Party | Candidate | Votes | % |
|---|---|---|---|
| Democratic | Bob Carter (incumbent) | 3,684 | 60.61% |
| Republican | Robert Labair | 2,394 | 39.39% |
| Total votes | | 6,078 | 100% |
| Democratic hold | | | |

==== District 97 ====
The new 97th district includes parts of western Missoula and has no incumbent. Democrat Melody Cunningham won the open seat.

Montana House of Representatives 97th district Democratic primary election, 2024
| Party | Candidate | Votes | % |
|---|---|---|---|
| Democratic | Melody Cunningham | 1,348 | 82.90% |
| Democratic | Lisa Verlanic | 278 | 17.10% |
| Total votes | | 1,626 | 100% |

Montana House of Representatives 97th district general election, 2024
| Party | Candidate | Votes | % |
|---|---|---|---|
| Democratic | Melody Cunningham | 3,651 | 60.35% |
| Republican | Nick Knowles | 2,152 | 35.57% |
| Libertarian | Richard Armerding | 247 | 4.08% |
| Total votes | | 6,050 | 100% |
| Democratic win (new seat) | | | |

==== District 98 ====
The new 98th district includes the home of incumbent Democrat Jonathan Karlen, who has represented the 96th district since 2023.

Montana House of Representatives 98th district general election, 2024
| Party | Candidate | Votes | % |
|---|---|---|---|
| Democratic | Jonathan Karlen (incumbent) | 3,684 | 57.71% |
| Republican | Jace Beard | 2,700 | 42.29% |
| Total votes | | 6,384 | 100% |
| Democratic hold | | | |

==== District 99 ====
The new 99th district includes the home of incumbent Democrat Tom France, who has represented the 94th district since 2021.

Montana House of Representatives 99th district general election, 2024
| Party | Candidate | Votes | % |
|---|---|---|---|
| Democratic | Tom France (incumbent) | 3,757 | 55.95% |
| Republican | Ryan Darling | 2,958 | 44.05% |
| Total votes | | 6,715 | 100% |
| Democratic hold | | | |

==== District 100 ====
The new 100th district includes the home of incumbent Democrat SJ Howell, who has represented the 95th district since 2023.

Montana House of Representatives 100th district Democratic primary election, 2024
| Party | Candidate | Votes | % |
|---|---|---|---|
| Democratic | SJ Howell (incumbent) | 1,230 | 72.06% |
| Democratic | Tim Garrison | 477 | 27.94% |
| Total votes | | 1,707 | 100% |

Montana House of Representatives 100th district general election, 2024
| Party | Candidate | Votes | % |
|---|---|---|---|
| Democratic | SJ Howell (incumbent) | 4,440 | 77.70% |
| Republican | Christopher Paul Buckles | 1,274 | 22.30% |
| Total votes | | 5,714 | 100% |
| Democratic hold | | | |

== See also ==
- List of Montana state legislatures
