= Montana Freedom Caucus =

US ultra-conservative political group

- Chair: Jerry Schillinger
- Vice Chair: Caleb Hinkle
- Founded: January 20, 2023; 3 years ago
- Ideology: Limited government; Right-wing populism
- Political position: Right-wing to far-right
- National affiliation: State Freedom Caucus Network
- Seats in the House Republican Conference: 13 / 58
- Seats in the House: 13 / 100
- Seats in the Senate Republican Conference: 8 / 32
- Seats in the Senate: 8 / 50

Website
- Montana Freedom Caucus

The Montana Freedom Caucus is a legislative caucus in the Montana legislature that seeks to advance conservative policies such as limited governance and a traditional social agenda on issues such as crime, immigration, public welfare, and abortion. It is affiliated with the State Freedom Caucus Network. Its members all belong to the Republican Party.

== History ==
In an effort to promote ultra-conservative policies in state legislatures, the Conservative Partnership Institute launched the State Freedom Caucus Network, which provides training and resources to state lawmakers who launch or join a Freedom Caucus in their state legislature. In January 2023, a group of 14 Montana lawmakers announced the creation of the Montana chapter.

The founding chairwoman, Senator Theresa Manzella, said the Caucus will "stand on the founding principles of the supremacy of individual rights, limited government, and personal responsibility" and seek to "rein in federal overreach". The group also listed election reform, blocking foreign ownership of land, advancing parental rights, judicial reform, tax reform, and school choice as core initiatives. Montana U.S. representative Matt Rosendale, a member of the House Freedom Caucus in the United States House of Representatives backed the group, calling it the "tip of the spear" in the state's conservative agenda and fight against "the radical left".

== Political positions and involvement ==
=== Intra-party relationship ===
Republicans have a supermajority in the state legislature, though Caucus members are said to be the "most conservative" in the Republican Caucus.

The Caucus publicly criticizes Republican lawmakers it views as not sufficiently conservative. The Caucus published a list of Representatives that it believes are insufficiently conservative, labelling them the "Dirty Dozen." In another instance, the caucus reposted recordings of robocalls that targeted Rep. Llew Jones, a member of the "Dirty Dozen", telling voters in his district that he was "gobbling up tax dollars to pay for more public spending." Caucus Chairman Rep. Jerry Schillinger said Jones and other lawmakers that worked with Democrats "disrespected what their voters thought they were getting in a conservative majority in the Senate to carry out a conservative agenda." and that Jones advocated a "big government agenda". Jones defended his actions, primarily his vote for a billion-dollar state trust, as advantageous for his district and in-line with conservative values.

Following Governor Greg Gianforte's 2025 "state of the state" address, the caucus gave a rebuttal speech arguing in favor of spending reductions, a policy it claims the governor and Senate Republicans fail to advance. Rep. Brad Barker accused the Freedom Caucus of advancing out-of-state interests and being disinterested in "good governance", but rather "controlling" the state's legislative process and attacking "Republicans who prioritize fiscal responsibility" in the process.

Manzella said the primary leading up to the 2024 general elections for the state legislature was "the ugliest primary season" she'd experienced. She defended her seat against a more mainstream opponent. The 2026 primary elections have seen many contested seats pitting Caucus members or Caucus-backed candidates challenging more mainstream Republicans, or Republican challengers who have worked with campaign groups the Caucus accuses of being "progressive".

==== Opposition to "the Nine" ====
The Caucus criticized several Republican lawmakers for voting alongside Democratic members. These Republicans have been called "the Nine", and have been accused of undermining the Republican Party's majority in the state Senate by establishing a working majority with the Chamber's 18 Democratic members. This working majority rejected the Senate's Republican leadership's rules package, a result the caucus said handed control of the Senate to Democrats.

One member of "the Nine", Sen. Shelley Vance, said the Caucus is generating "loud noise" about her beliefs, but that she supports much of what the caucus does. Vance has denied the Caucus' claims that "the Nine" made a backroom deal with Democrats to seize control of the Chamber, but that she is only aligning with Democrats on an issue-by-issue basis and according to her values.

During the state Party's June 2025 convention, the Caucus encouraged delegates to prohibit "the Nine" from voting in the party's leadership elections. The effort passed in a 136-to-97 vote. Vance and other Senators of "the Nine", sued the state Party, arguing they were disenfranchised because the Party's rules authorize a vote for all state legislators. The Party's leadership argued the Party has a First Amendment right "to manage its affairs as it sees fit, including censuring and expelling members".

In the lead-up to the 2026 primary elections, the Caucus has supported challengers to "the Nine" and other legislators it considers to have insufficiently advanced conservative policies.

==== County party disputes ====
The caucus has been accused of seeking to take power of the state party, local county parties and their central committees. Following changes in the Party's by-laws made during the June 2025 convention, local central committees were told to postpone local conventions and officer elections until December 2026. A non-freedom caucus Republican sued his local county's committee that enforced the postponement, saying it violated state law. A state court agreed and ordered the Committee to hold an election for its officers.

=== Election reform ===
The caucus opposed Citizen Initiative 127, which would have required candidates for state and federal office to receive a majority share of votes, rather than a plurality. The Initiative was rejected, with 60% of voters voting "no".

=== Medicaid expansion ===
Members of the caucus have opposed expansion of Medicaid in the state, an effort supported by mainline Republicans. Manzella identified this issue as a splitting point between caucus members and other Republicans.

=== Tax reform ===
In April 2025, the caucus opposed Gov. Gianforte's property tax reform, which aimed to lower property taxes for owner-occupied and long-term rentals, claiming that the bill would result in increased rates for businesses and second homes. The Caucus blamed Democrats and "the Nine" for the bill's passage, which a majority of Republican opposed.

=== Transgender issues ===
During the 2023–24 legislative session, Caucus member Sen. Carl Glimm introduced a bill that would define "sex" as male and female in state law. In opposition, transgender state lawmaker Rep. Zooey Zephyr accused supporters of the law, mostly Republicans, as having "blood on [their] hands". In response, the speaker of the House barred Zephyr from speaking in the chamber until an apology was given. The caucus expressed support for the speaker's decision.

== Membership ==
Caucus membership is on the Freedom Caucus Network website, but some members do not disclose their association. It claimed to have fourteen members at the time of its launch in January 2023.

=== House ===
Representative	Party	District
Tom Millett	Republican	2nd
Kathy Love	Republican	85th
Lee Deming	Republican	55th
Nelly Nicol	Republican	53rd
Jane Gillette	Republican	64th
Braxton Mitchell	Republican	5th
Fiona Nave	Republican	57th
Paul Fielder	Republican	14th
Jedediah Hinkle	Republican	67th
Bob Phalen	Republican	36th
Jerry Schillinger	Republican	34th
Caleb Hinkle	Republican	68th
Greg Kmetz	Republican	36th

=== Senate ===
Senator	Party	District
Tony Tezak	Republican	35th
Daniel Emrich	Republican	11th
Vince Ricci	Republican	55th
John Fuller	Republican	8th
Carl Glimm	Republican	2nd
Mark Noland	Republican	5th
Barry Usher	Republican	40th
Theresa Manzella	Republican	44th

=== Former members ===
- Rep. Steven Galloway
