= Sartell High School =

Public high school in Sartell, Minnesota

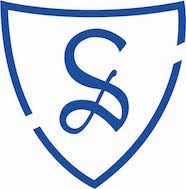

Location
- 3101 Pinecone Rd North; Sartell, Minnesota 56377; United States; 45°39′39″N 94°13′31″W

Information
- Type: Public
- Motto: “Future Minded, Student Focused”
- Established: 1993
- School district: Sartell - St. Stephen Schools
- Principal: Shayne Kusler
- Teaching staff: 77.11 (FTE)
- Enrollment: 1,269 (2024-2025)
- Student to teacher ratio: 16.46
- Colors: Blue and White
- Athletics conference: Central Lakes Conference
- Nickname: Sabres
- Website: School website

Sartell High School is a public high school in Sartell, Minnesota, United States.

The original high school was constructed in 1969 and was the middle school prior to the 2020-2021 school year. It is now Riverview Intermediate School.

The old high school was constructed in 1993 and was remodeled to become the new Sartell Middle School. The new Sartell High School opened to the public fall of 2019.

It also includes a Student-Run Coffee Shop combined with the School Spirit Shop

== Demographics ==
The demographic breakdown of the 1,032 students enrolled for the 2012–2013 school year was:

- Male - 52.5%
- Female - 47.5%
- Asian/Pacific islander - 1.3%
- Black - 0.9%
- Hispanic - 1.3%
- White - 96.4%
- Multiracial - 0.1%

In addition, 13.2% of the students were eligible for free or reduced lunch.

== Athletics ==
Sartell's team name is the Sabres and their colors are royal blue and white. The following sports are offered:

- Baseball
- Basketball - Boys
- Basketball - Girls
- Cross Country
- Dance Team
- Football
- Golf - Boys
- Golf - Girls
- Gymnastics
- Hockey - Boys
- Hockey - Girls
- Knowledge Bowl
- Lacrosse - Boys
- Lacrosse - Girls
- Soccer - Boys
- Soccer - Girls
- Softball
- Swimming & Diving - Boys
- Swimming & Diving - Girls
- Tennis - Boys
- Tennis - Girls
- Track and Field - Boys and Girls
- Volleyball
- Wrestling

== Alumni ==
- Naarah Hastings (class of 1998) — politician
- For All Those Sleeping (class of 2007) — metalcore band
