= Alice Buckley =

Alice Buckley may refer to:

- Alice Buckley (politician) (born 1992/93), American member of the Montana House of Representatives
- Alice Buckley (racing driver) (born 2007), Australian racing driver
