= Greg Oblander =

American politician

Member of the Montana House of Representatives from the 38th district
- Incumbent
- Assumed office January 6, 2025
- Preceded by: Greg Kmetz

Member of the Montana House of Representatives from the 40th district
- In office January 4, 2023 – January 6, 2025
- Preceded by: Barry Usher
- Succeeded by: Mike Vinton

Personal details
- Party: Republican
- Education: Logan University

Greg Oblander is an American politician from Montana. He is a Republican member of the Montana House of Representatives for District 38. The district is primarily Musselshell and Golden Valley counties and eastern parts of Yellowstone County.

== Elections ==
Oblander first ran for office in 2022. House District 40 incumbent Barry Usher did not seek re-election in order to run for Montana State Senate. Oblander won the primary and ran unopposed in the general election.

Due to redistricting following the US census Oblander ran for District 38 in the 2024 elections. He was once again uncontested.

=== 2022 State House of Representatives Election ===
Montana House of Representatives 40th district general election, 2022
Party	Candidate	Votes	%
Republican	Greg Oblander	4,029	100%
Total votes		4,029	100%
Republican hold			
