= Lukas Schubert =

Lukas Schubert may refer to:

- Lukas Schubert (footballer)
- Lukas Schubert (politician)
