= Zach Brown (disambiguation) =

Zach Brown (born 1989) is an American former professional football player.

Zach Brown or similar names may also refer to:

- Zach Brown (politician) (born 1990), American politician
- Zac Brown (born 1978), American singer and musician
- Zak Brown (born 1971), American businessman, CEO of McLaren Racing and former racing driver
- Zak Brown (footballer, born 2000) (born 2000), English footballer see 2022–23 National League
- Zak Brown (footballer) (born 2002), English footballer
- Zack Brown of Black Swan (film) § Costume design

== See also ==
- Zac Brown Band
- Zachary Browne, American actor
