= Tom Berry (Montana politician) =

American republican

Member of the Montana House of Representatives from the 40th district
- In office 2009–2017
- Succeeded by: Barry Usher

Personal details
- Party: Republican
- Profession: Business owner, rancher

Tom Berry is an American politician who served as a member of the Montana House of Representatives from the 40th district. Elected in 2008, Berry represented the Roundup, Montana area until January 2017.
