= Kelly Flynn =

American politician (1954–2021)

Member of the Montana House of Representatives from the 68th district
- In office January 3, 2011 – January 7, 2019
- Preceded by: Scott Sales
- Succeeded by: Julie Dooling

Personal details
- Born: October 4, 1954 Townsend, Montana
- Died: March 3, 2021 (aged 66) Helena, Montana
- Party: Republican

Kelly Flynn (October 4, 1954 – March 3, 2021) was an American politician who served as a Republican member of the Montana House of Representatives from 2011 to 2019. He was elected to House District 68 which represents the Townsend area.

He died of kidney and lung cancer on March 3, 2021, in Helena, Montana, at age 66.
