= Senator Hinkle =

Senator Hinkle may refer to:

- Greg Hinkle (born 1946), Montana State Senate
- James F. Hinkle (1862–1951), New Mexico State Senate
- Jedediah Hinkle (born 1980), Montana State Senate
