= Becky Edwards (Montana politician) =

American politician

Member of the Montana House of Representatives from the 61st district
- Incumbent
- Assumed office January 6, 2025
- Succeeded by: Jim Hamilton

Personal details
- Party: Democratic
- Education: Montana State University
- Website: https://www.beckyformontana.com/

Becky Edwards is an American politician who was elected member of the Montana House of Representatives for the 61st district in 2024.

In 2002, Edwards graduated from Montana State University. She has lived in Bozeman for 26 years.
