= Katharin Kelker =

American politician (born 1943)

Member of the Montana Senate from the 24th district
- In office January 2, 2023 – November 13, 2024
- Preceded by: Mary McNally
- Succeeded by: Emma Kerr-Carpenter

Member of the Montana House of Representatives from the 47th district
- In office January 5, 2015 – January 2, 2023
- Preceded by: Mary McNally
- Succeeded by: Denise Baum

Personal details
- Born: May 7, 1943 (age 83) Cleveland, Ohio
- Party: Democratic
- Spouse: Paul
- Children: 4
- Education: Hiram College, Montana State University

Katharin "Kathy" Kelker (born May 7, 1943) is an American politician who served as a Democratic member of the Montana Senate. She previously served in the Montana House of Representatives from 2015 to 2023 before being termed out. She resigned from the Montana Senate in November 2024.

== 2014 election ==
In the 2014 election, Mary McNally ran unopposed in the primary until she withdrew to become the replacement nominee for Montana Senate district 24. Kelker took her place and defeated Republican opponent Joshua Sizemore.

2014 Montana House of Representatives 47th District election
Party	Candidate	Votes	%
Democratic	Katharin Kelker	1,701	56.2
Republican	Joshua Sizemore	1,328	43.8

== 2016 election ==
Kelker ran unopposed in the primary and defeated Republican Jason Thomas.

2016 Montana House of Representatives 47th District election
Party	Candidate	Votes	%
Democratic	Katharin Kelker	2,272	58.51
Republican	Jason Thomas	1,611	41.49

== 2018 election ==
Kelker ran unopposed in the primary and defeated Republican Colton Zaugg.

2018 Montana House of Representatives 47th District election
Party	Candidate	Votes	%
Democratic	Katharin Kelker	2,352	59.7
Republican	Colton Zaugg	1,586	40.3

== 2020 election ==
Kelker ran unopposed in the primary and defeated Republican TJ Smith.

2020 Montana House of Representatives 47th District election
Party	Candidate	Votes	%
Democratic	Katharin Kelker	2,485	55.5
Republican	TJ Smith	1,992	44.5

== 2022 election ==
After being term limited in the House of Representatives, Kelker ran for the 24th Senate District. Kelker ran unopposed in the primary and defeated Republican Elijah Tidswell.

2022 Montana Senate 24th District election
Party	Candidate	Votes	%
Democratic	Katharin Kelker	3,804	55.9
Republican	Elijah Tidswell	3,003	41.1
