= Denise Baum =

Montana politician

Member of the Montana House of Representatives from the 45th district
- Incumbent
- Assumed office January 6, 2025
- Preceded by: Katie Zolnikov

Member of the Montana House of Representatives from the 47th district
- In office January 2, 2023 – January 6, 2025
- Preceded by: Kathy Kelker
- Succeeded by: James Reavis

Personal details
- Born: West Allis, Wisconsin
- Party: Democratic Party

Denise Baum is an American politician from Montana. She is a Democratic member of the Montana House of Representatives representing District 45. The district roughly covers the north-central area of Billings, Montana.

Baum first ran for office in the 2022 elections. The incumbent for the 47th district, Kathy Kelker, could not run due to term limits. Baum faced Republican challenger Thomas J. Madigan and won with 58% of the vote.

Due to redistricting following the US census Baum ran for District 45 in the 2024 elections. The 47th district was expanded and renamed the 45th district. She defeated Republican Kassidy Olson with 53% of the vote.

== 2023 Legislature ==
Baum represented the 47th district from Billings, Montana in the 68th Montana Legislature. She served on three committees: State Administration and Veterans Affairs; Transportation; and Fish, Wildlife, and Parks. She also served as the vice chair of the Interim Transportation Committee that worked to bring the passenger rail to Montana. She sponsored and passed HB362, which expanded crisis intervention team training. She also sponsored HB301, which would add a penalty enhancement for those in possession of a firearm while committing felony drug trafficking offenses.

== 2025 Legislature ==
In the 69th Montana Legislature Baum represented the 45th district. She served on the Judiciary, Agriculture, and Transportation committees. Additionally, she served on the Transportation Interim Committee.

== Personal life ==
Baum was born in West Allis, Wisconsin. She received a bachelor's degree in Criminal Justice Administration from Mount Senario College. Baum is a retired detective from the Billings, Montana police department. She serves as a member of the Salvation Army advisory board and as a committee chair and adult leader for Boy Scouts of America Troop 77 in Billings. She and her spouse, Craig, have one son.

== Electoral history ==
Montana House of Representatives 47th district general election, 2022
Party	Candidate	Votes	%
Democratic	Denise Baum	1,897	58.64%
Republican	Thomas J. Madigan	1,338	41.36%
Total votes		3,235	100%

Montana House of Representatives 47th district general election, 2024
Party	Candidate	Votes	%
Democratic	Denise Baum	2,603	52.9%
Republican	Kassidy Olson	2,314	47.1%
Total votes		4,917	100%
