= Marty Malone =

American politician (born 1948)

Member of the Montana House of Representatives from the 59th district
- In office January 4, 2021 – January 4, 2025
- Preceded by: Alan Redfield
- Succeeded by: Scott Rosenzweig

Personal details
- Born: 1948 (age 77–78) Appleton, Wisconsin, U.S.
- Party: Republican
- Spouse: Gayleen
- Children: 2
- Education: Montana State University (BS)

Marty Malone is an American politician who served as a member of the Montana House of Representatives from the 59th district. Elected in November 2020, he assumed office on January 4, 2021 and served until January 4, 2025.

== Early life and education ==
Malone was born in Appleton, Wisconsin. He attended Pacific Lutheran University for one year and earned a Bachelor of Science degree in agricultural economics from Montana State University.

== Career ==
Prior to entering politics, Malone worked as a fleet sales manager and for the government of Montana. Malone was elected to the Montana House of Representatives in November 2020 and assumed office on January 4, 2021, succeeding Alan Redfield. Malone lives in Park County, Montana, where he operates a ranch. Representative Malone was defeated by Democrat Scott Rosenzweig in the 2024 Montana House of Representatives election for House District 57.
