= Shelly Fyant =

American politician

Member of the Montana House of Representatives from the 91st district
- Incumbent
- Assumed office January 2025

Personal details
- Born: St. Ignatius, Montana
- Party: Democratic
- Education: University of Montana

Shelly Fyant is an American politician elected to the Montana House of Representatives from the 91st district in the 2024 election, as a member of the Democratic Party.

== Career ==
Fyant earned a BS in Business Administration from the University of Montana. She served two terms on the Confederated Salish and Kootenai Tribes Tribal Council including as chairwoman in 2020 and 2021. She has also worked as a food sovereignty consultant in Arlee.

== See also ==
- List of Native American politicians
- Native American women in politics
