= Zachary Wirth =

American politician

Member of the Montana House of Representatives from the 17th district
- Incumbent
- Assumed office January 6, 2025
- Preceded by: Ross Fitzgerald

Member of the Montana House of Representatives from the 80th district
- In office January 3, 2023 – January 6, 2025
- Preceded by: Becky Beard
- Succeeded by: Melissa Romano

Personal details
- Born: June 9, 1951 (age 75) Great Falls, Montana
- Party: Republican
- Children: 6
- Profession: Rancher

Zachary Eric Wirth (born June 9, 1951) is an American politician who has served as a member of the Montana House of Representatives since January 2, 2023. He represents the 17th district which includes Lewis and Clark and Powell counties.

In 2023 Wirth was appointed to represent District 80 due to a vacancy. The previous Representative, Becky Beard, was appointed to the Montana Senate. Wirth previously lost to Beard in the 2016 primary.

Due to redistricting following the US census Wirth ran for District 17 in the 2024 elections. He obtained 75% of the vote against challenger Leonard Bates. For the 2025 legislative session he was appointed Vice Chair of the House Transportation committee and also serves on the House State Administration and House Agriculture committees.

== Personal life ==
Wirth is the owner of Rocking Z Guest Ranch which is near Wolf Creek.
