= Alan Redfield =

American politician

Member of the Montana House of Representatives from the 59th district
- In office January 7, 2013 – January 4, 2021
- Preceded by: Joanne Blyton
- Succeeded by: Marty Malone

Member of the Montana House of Representatives from the 61st district
- In office January 3, 2011 – January 7, 2013

Personal details
- Born: 1953 (age 72–73)
- Party: Republican
- Occupation: Politician

Alan Redfield (born c. 1953) is an American politician. He was a member of the Montana House of Representatives from the 59th District, from 2013 to 2021. He is a member of the Republican party.

== Awards ==
- 2019 Friend of Farm Bureau Award. Presented by Montana Farm Bureau Federation.

== Personal life ==
Redfield's wife is Laurie Redfield. They have two children. Redfield and his family live in Livingston, Montana.
