= Mallerie Stromswold =

American politician (born 2001)

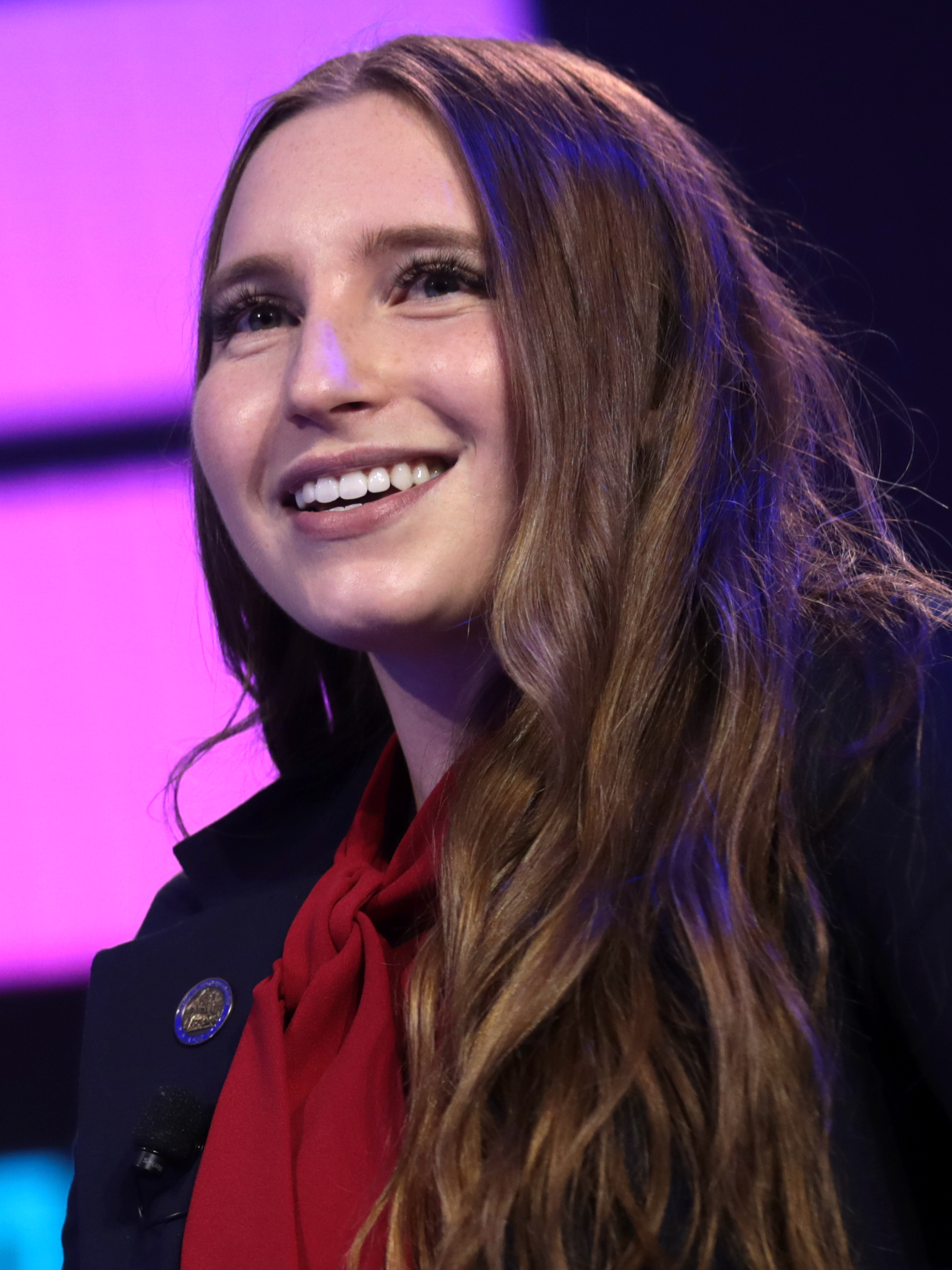

Member of the Montana House of Representatives from the 50th district
- In office January 4, 2021 – January 17, 2023
- Preceded by: Jade Bahr
- Succeeded by: Naarah Hastings

Personal details
- Born: October 29, 2001 (age 24) Billings, Montana
- Party: Republican

Mallerie Stromswold is a former American politician who was a member of the Montana Legislature from District 50. In 2023, she resigned after citing mental health challenges and backlash for consistently voting against the Republican Party.

She was elected in 2020.

== Electoral history ==
=== 2020 ===
Montana House of Representatives 50th district Republican primary, 2020
Party	Candidate	Votes	%
Republican	Mallerie Stromswold	1,180	100.00%

Montana House of Representatives 50th district general election, 2020
Party	Candidate	Votes	%
Republican	Mallerie Stromswold	2,229	52.81%
Democratic	Jade Bahr (incumbent)	1,992	47.19%
Total votes		4,221	100%
Republican gain from Democratic			

=== 2022 ===
Montana House of Representatives 50th district Republican primary, 2022
Party	Candidate	Votes	%
Republican	Mallerie Stromswold	1,028	100.00%

Montana House of Representatives 50th district general election, 2022
Party	Candidate	Votes	%
Republican	Mallerie Stromswold (incumbent)	1,468	51.82%
Democratic	James Reavis	1,365	48.18%
Total votes		2,833	100%
Republican hold			
