= Christy Clark (Montana politician) =

American politician (born 1966)

Member of the Montana House of Representatives from the 17 district
- In office January 3, 2011 – January 2, 2017
- Preceded by: Russel S. Bean
- Succeeded by: Ross Fitzgerald

Personal details
- Born: March 1, 1966 (age 60) Choteau, Montana
- Party: Republican
- Education: California State University, Sacramento
- Profession: Rancher, business owner

Christy Clark (born March 1, 1966) is a former Republican member of the Montana Legislature. She served as vice-chair of the Montana Republican Party. She was elected to House District 17 which represents Teton County, Augusta, and part of Lincoln.
