= Jade Bahr =

American educator and politician

Member of the Montana House of Representatives from the 50th district
- In office January 7, 2019 – January 4, 2021
- Preceded by: Virginia Court
- Succeeded by: Mallerie Stromswold

Personal details
- Born: December 28, 1988 (age 37) Crow Agency, Montana
- Party: Democratic Party
- Other political affiliations: Democratic Socialists of America
- Education: University of Montana

Jade Bahr (born December 28, 1988) is a Democratic Party politician and was a member Montana House of Representatives from District 50 who has served between 2019 and 2021.

== Early life and education ==
Bahr was born in Crow Agency, Montana, and was raised in Billings, Montana. She graduated from Billings Senior High School, and spent her summers living on the Crow Indian Reservation with her grandparents. After high school, Bahr earned a bachelor's degree in sociology with an emphasis in inequalities and social justice from the University of Montana at Missoula.

She is an enrolled member of the Northern Cheyenne tribe.

== Career ==
She began her interest in social services after working as a receptionist at a foster-care network for Native American youth. She continued to work for programs targeted toward at-risk youth at organizations like Big Brothers Big Sisters, New Day Youth Group home and Day Treatment, and also Missoula Parks and Recreation summer camps & after-school programs.

She also worked as a mental health support worker for the Urban Indian Health and Wellness Center. She has worked with adults with disabilities in supported living and supported employment services as a vocational specialist and community coordinator.

=== Political career ===
Bahr's committee assignments for the 2019-20 legislative session included: Human Services, Legislative Administration, and State Administration.

=== Electoral history ===
In the 2018 general election, Bahr was endorsed by the Democratic Socialists of America, AFL–CIO, the Montana Conservation Voters, Carol's List and others.

Bahr lost her bid for re-election to Mallerie Stromswold in the 2020 general election.

Montana House of Representatives District 50 General Election, 2018
| Party | Candidate | Votes | % |
|---|---|---|---|
| Democratic | Jade Bahr | 1,778 | 53.8 |
| Republican | Quentin Eggart | 1,437 | 40.8 |
| Libertarian | Nathan McKenty | 190 | 5.4 |

Montana House of Representatives District 50 Democratic Primary Election, 2018
| Party | Candidate | Votes | % |
|---|---|---|---|
| Democratic | Jade Bahr | 622 | 68.2 |
| Democratic | Joshua Bradshaw | 290 | 31.8 |

=== Sponsored legislation ===
Bahr sponsored five bills during the 2019 legislative session and three of which were signed into law:

- HB 466: Fund a Native American language and culture online course through the MT Digital Academy.
- HB 468: To require state agencies to coordinate for disability integrated employment programs.
- HB 498: Allow probationers and parolees to use medical marijuana.
- HB 632: To require economic impact reports for reservations.
- HB 748: Establish the Minnie Spotted-Wolf memorial highway.

== See also ==
- List of Democratic Socialists of America public officeholders
- List of Native American politicians
- Native American women in politics
