= James Bergstrom (politician) =

American politician

The Honorable

Member of the Montana House of Representatives from the 30th district
- Incumbent
- Assumed office January 2, 2023
- Preceded by: Wylie Galt

Personal details
- Party: Republican
- Education: Great Falls College Montana State University
- Profession: Farmer

James Bergstrom is an American politician who has served as a member of the Montana House of Representatives since January 2, 2023. He represents Montana's 30th House district.

== Electoral history ==
He was elected on November 8, 2022, in the 2022 Montana House of Representatives election against Democratic opponent Wendy Palmer. He assumed office on January 2, 2023. He ran for reelection but lost to Randyn Gregg in the 2024 Montana House of Representatives election.

== Biography ==
Bergstrom earned an associate degree in computer science and a bachelor's degree in business administration and accounting from Great Falls College Montana State University in 1994.

Montana House of Representatives
Preceded by Wylie Galt	Member of the Montana House of Representatives; 2023–present	Succeeded by incumbent
