= Doug Flament =

American politician

Member of the Montana House of Representatives from the 29th District
- In office December 14, 2021 – January 10, 2023
- Preceded by: Dan Bartel
- Succeeded by: Ed Butcher

Personal details
- Party: Republican

Doug Flament is an American politician who served in the Montana House of Representatives from Montana's 29th district. He was appointed to the seat after incumbent Republican Dan Bartel was appointed to the Montana Senate. He was selected to replace Bartel and was sworn in on December 14, 2021. He resigned on January 10, 2023 due to health issues.
