= Jerry Schillinger =

American politician from Montana

Member of the Montana House of Representatives from the 34th district
- Incumbent
- Assumed office January 6, 2025
- Preceded by: Rhonda Knudsen

Member of the Montana House of Representatives from the 37th district
- In office January 4, 2021 – January 6, 2025
- Preceded by: Eric Moore
- Succeeded by: Shane Klakken

Personal details
- Party: Republican
- Education: University of Montana
- Occupation: Farmer

Jerry Schillinger is an American politician from Montana. He is a Republican member of the Montana House of Representatives for District 34.

Schillinger previously represented the 37th district. Due to redistricting following the US census he ran for District 34 in the 2024 elections.

He is the Chairman of the Montana Freedom Caucus.

== Montana State Legislature ==
=== 2020 State House of Representatives ===
Montana's 37th District House of Representatives Primary Election, 2020
Party	Candidate	Votes	%
Republican	Jerry Schillinger	2,658	64.08
Republican	Frederick "Eric" Moore (incumbent)	1,490	35.92
Total votes		4,148	100

Montana's 37th District House of Representatives General Election, 2020
Party	Candidate	Votes	%
Republican	Jerry Schillinger	5,457	90.05
Libertarian	Jacob Kitson	603	9.95
Total votes		6,060	100

During the legislative session he served on the Joint Natural Resources and Transportation committee and the House Appropriations committee.

=== 2022 State House of Representatives ===
Schillinger ran uncontested in the primary and received 3,045 votes. He also ran uncontested in the general election, receiving 4,654 votes.

During the legislative session he was assigned to six committees. He was Chair for House Ethics and a joint Appropriations subcommittee on Natural Resources and Transportation.

=== 2024 State House of Representatives ===
Schillinger ran uncontested in the general election.

For the 69th Montana Legislature he was again Chair for the joint Appropriations subcommittee on Natural Resources and Transportation. He was also assigned Vice-Chair for House Rules and as a member to House Appropriations.
