= Russ Miner =

American politician from Montana

Member of the Montana House of Representatives from the 26th district
- Incumbent
- Assumed office January 4, 2025
- Preceded by: George Nikolakakos

Member of the Montana House of Representatives from the 19th district
- In office January 2, 2023 – January 4, 2025
- Preceded by: Wendy McKamey
- Succeeded by: Jane Weber

Personal details
- Party: Republican

Russ Miner is an American politician. He serves as a Republican member for the 26th district of the Montana House of Representatives.

Miner first ran for office in 2022. He was the only candidate for District 19. Due to redistricting following the US census Miner ran for District 26 in the 2024 elections. He was once again unopposed.

During the 2023 legislative session Miner served on five committees. He was on both the House and Joint Fish, Wildlife and Parks, both the House and Joint Natural Resources, and the Taxation committees. In 2025 he was Vice-chair for the Agriculture committee and a member of the Taxation committee.
