= Mike Vinton =

American politician

Member of the Montana House of Representatives from the 40th district
- Incumbent
- Assumed office January 6, 2025
- Preceded by: Greg Oblander

Personal details
- Born: 1966 (age 59–60) Whitefish, Montana
- Party: Republican

Mike Vinton is an American politician. He serves as a Republican member for the 40th district of the Montana House of Representatives. District 40 roughly covers Lockwood, Montana.

Vinton first ran for office in the 2024 Montana House of Representatives election. Due to redistricting following the US census incumbent Greg Oblander ran for District 38. Vinton defeated Democratic challenger Bob Auch with 74% of the vote. He was assigned to the Appropriations committee and the Long-Range Planning subcommittee.

== Personal life ==
Vinton was born in Whitefish, Montana. He is self-employed as a General Contractor. He has served as Board President for the Home Builders Association of Billings.
