= Kelly McCarthy =

American politician (born 1966)

Member of the Montana House of Representatives from the 49th district
- In office January 5, 2015 – June 2018
- Preceded by: Mary McNally
- Succeeded by: Emma Kerr-Carpenter

Member of the Montana House of Representatives from the 51st district
- In office January 7, 2013 – January 5, 2015
- Preceded by: Robyn Driscoll
- Succeeded by: Margaret MacDonald

Personal details
- Born: March 28, 1966 (age 60) Billings, Montana, U.S.
- Party: Democratic

Kelly McCarthy (born March 28, 1966) is an American politician who served as a member of the Montana House of Representatives from 2013 to 2015 and again from 2015 to 2018.

== Career ==
He was first elected to District 51 of the House of Representatives in 2012, after which he assumed that office on January 7, 2013. McCarthy served District 51 until being redistricted in 2015. Kelly McCarthy now represents District 49, which encompasses part of Billings in Yellowstone County, Montana.

In 2017, McCarthy ran for Montana's at-large United States House of Representatives district in a special election caused by Ryan Zinke's elevation to Secretary of the Interior. McCarthy failed to secure the nomination at the Democratic convention.

McCarthy resigned from office in 2018 after announcing that he would join his wife in Australia. Emma Kerr-Carpenter was selected to succeed him in the House.

Montana House of Representatives
Preceded by Mary McNally	Member of the Montana House of Representatives from the 49th district 2015–2018	Succeeded by Emma Kerr-Carpenter
Preceded by Robyn Driscoll	Member of the Montana House of Representatives from the 51st district 2013–2015	Succeeded by Margaret McDonald
