= Joanne Blyton =

American politician

Member of the Montana House of Representatives from the 59th district
- In office January 3, 2011 – January 7, 2013
- Succeeded by: Alan Redfield

Personal details
- Born: December 7, 1947 (age 78) Laurel, Maryland
- Party: Republican

Joanne Blyton (born December 7, 1947) is a Republican member of the Montana Legislature. She was elected to House District 59 which represents the Carbon County area.
