= Ross Fitzgerald (politician) =

American politician

Member of the Montana House of Representatives from the 17th district
- In office January 2, 2017 – January 6, 2025
- Preceded by: Christy Clark
- Succeeded by: Zachary Wirth

Personal details
- Born: 1949 (age 76–77) Great Falls, Montana
- Party: Republican

Ross Fitzgerald is an American politician who was a Republican member of the Montana House of Representatives. He represented the 17th district from 2017 to 2025.
