= Michele Binkley =

American politician (born 1968)

Member of the Montana House of Representatives from the 85th district
- In office January 4, 2021 – January 6, 2025
- Preceded by: Theresa Manzella
- Succeeded by: Kathy Love

Personal details
- Born: 1968 (age 57–58) Browning, Montana
- Party: Republican
- Spouse: Dwayne
- Children: 2

Michele Binkley is an American politician who served as a member of the Montana House of Representatives from the 85th district. Elected in 2020, she assumed office on January 4, 2021. Prior to entering politics, Binkley was an escrow officer at First American Title. She lost re-nomination to Kathy Love in 2025.
