= Greg Kmetz =

American politician

Member of the Montana House of Representatives from the 36th district
- Incumbent
- Assumed office January 6, 2025
- Preceded by: Bob Phalen

Member of the Montana House of Representatives from the 38th district
- In office January 2, 2023 – January 6, 2025
- Preceded by: Kenneth Holmlund
- Succeeded by: Greg Oblander

Personal details
- Party: Republican
- Spouse: Alice
- Children: 3
- Education: University of Wyoming

Greg Kmetz is an American politician from Montana. He is a Republican member of the Montana House of Representatives for the 36th district.

== Career ==
Kmetz was elected to District 38 of the Montana House of Representatives in 2022. He won 65% of the popular vote against Democrat Steve Muggli.

Due to redistricting following the US census Kmetz ran for District 36 in the 2024 elections. He defeated Democratic challenger Stan Taylor with 70% of the vote.

=== 2023 legislative session ===
In February 2023, Kmetz introduced House Bill 645, which would have made it a misdemeanor for those vaccinated against COVID-19 to donate blood. The bill was killed in the House Human Services committee.

=== 2025 Legislative session ===
In 2025, Kmetz introduced House Bill 371, which was designed to ban mRNA vaccines in the state of Montana. The bill did not pass the House, with 66 voting against.

== Personal life ==
Kmetz married his wife, Alice, on February 3, 1979. They have three children and reside in Miles City, Montana.

Prior to being elected, Kmetz owned a welding and machine shop.
