= Jonathan Karlen =

American Democratic politician

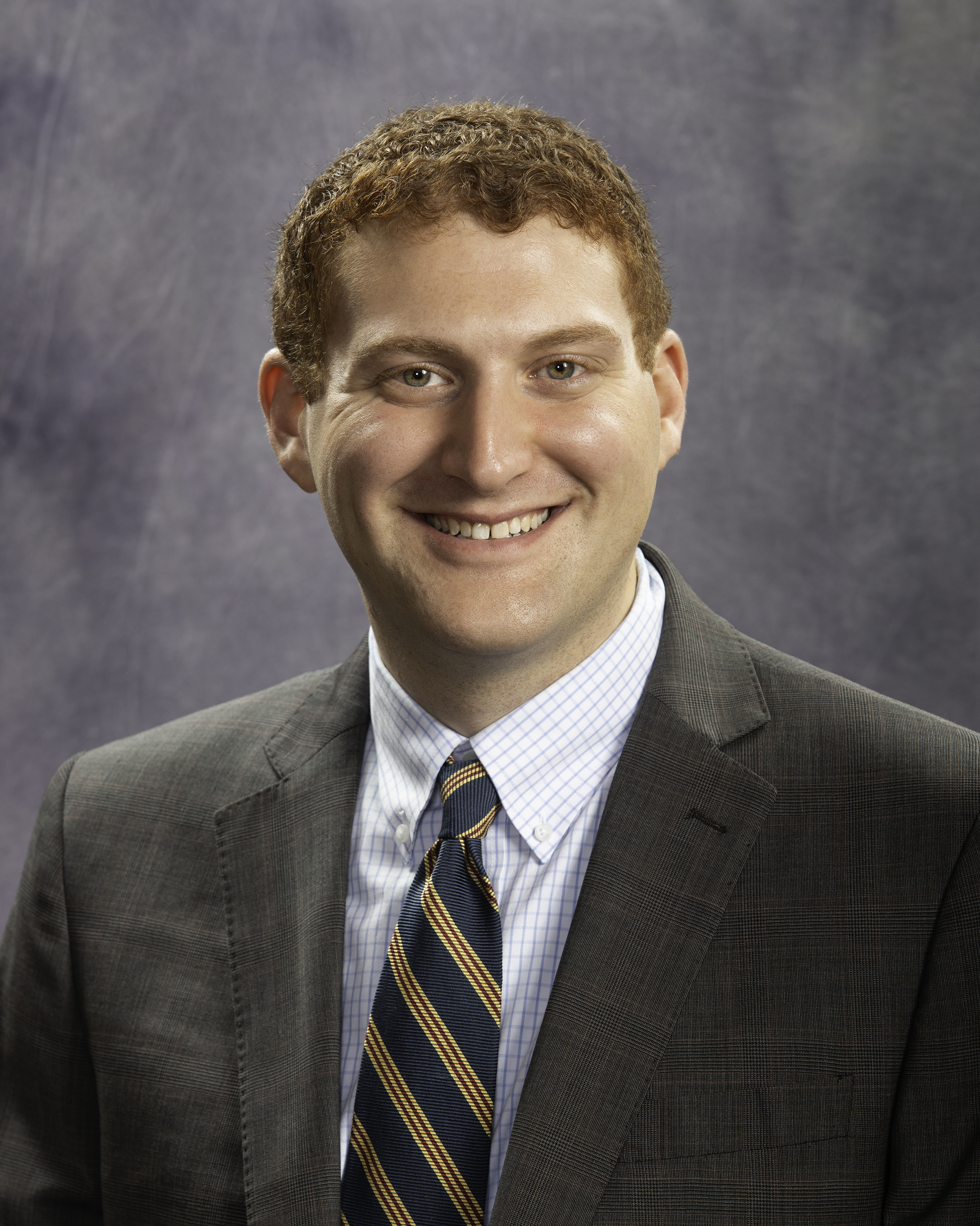
- Official Portrait

Member of the Montana House of Representatives from the 98th district
- Incumbent
- Assumed office January 2, 2023
- Preceded by: Kathy Whitman

Personal details
- Born: Jonathan Karlen; August 27, 1999 (age 27)
- Party: Democratic
- Education: University of Montana (BS); University of Montana (MPA)
- Occupation: Research Associate, University of Montana
- Website: Official website

Jonathan G. Karlen (born August 27, 1999) is an American politician. He currently serves as a Democratic member of the Montana House of Representatives for District 98, which encompasses Missoula, since 2023. Karlen is among the youngest state legislators in the United States.

== Education ==
Karlen was born August 27, 1999. Karlen graduated from the University of Montana with a Bachelor of Science in wildlife biology with a minor in climate change studies. He also completed a Master of Public Administration with a public policy focus from the University of Montana.

== Career ==
Karlen has interned for various government agencies including the Arizona Game and Fish Department in Seligman, Arizona, and the Montana Fish, Wildlife and Parks Department in the Bob Marshall Wilderness. In 2020, Karlen was a legislative affairs intern at the U.S. Forest Service, Office of the Chief in Washington, D.C. Karlen is an alumnus of the Max Baucus Leaders Program serving as a legislative intern for the U.S. Senate majority leader. He is currently a board member of the Climate and Energy Board of Missoula, Montana and works as a wildlife research associate of the Boone and Crockett Club based at the University of Montana, and coaches youth ski racing.

== Politics ==
In January 2022, he announced that he will run for office. He defeated Democrat Linda Swanson in the primary election (67%-33%).

In the 2022 Montana House of Representative election, he was elected into the house, defeating incumbent Kathy Whitman (R). He assumed office on January 2, 2023, with his current term ending January 6, 2025. He is a member of the Natural Resources, Business and Labor, Legislative Administration, and Fish, Wildlife and Parks committees.
