= Wayne Rusk =

American politician

Member of the Montana House of Representatives from the 88th district
- In office January 2, 2023 – January 6, 2025
- Preceded by: Sharon Greef
- Succeeded by: Greg Overstreet

Personal details
- Party: Republican

Wayne Rusk is an American politician. He served as a Republican member for the 88th district of the Montana House of Representatives from 2023 to 2025.
