= Lukas Schubert (politician) =

American politician (born 2005)

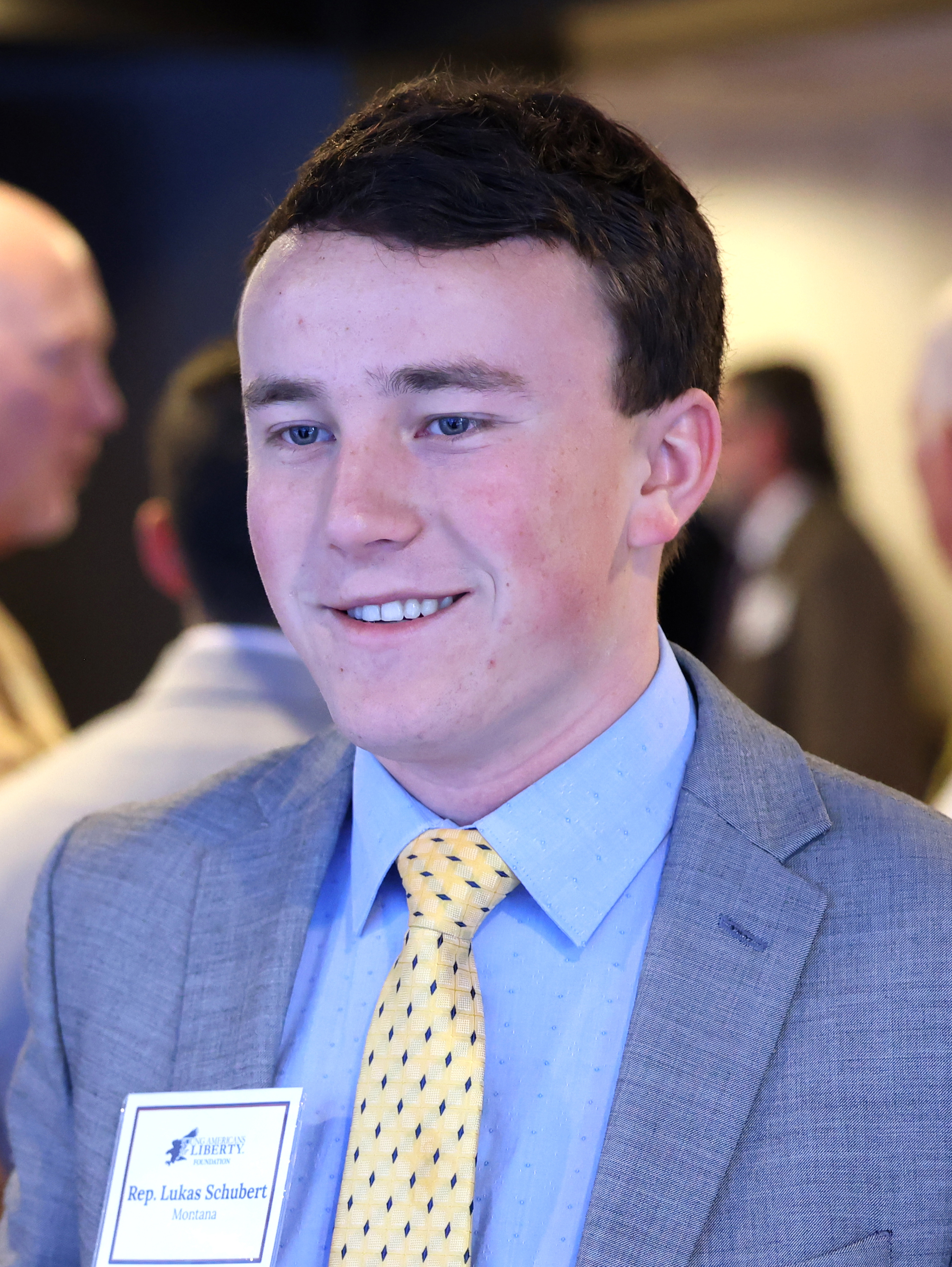
- Schubert at the 2024 Hazlitt Summit

Member of the Montana House of Representatives from the 8th district
- Incumbent
- Assumed office January 6, 2025
- Preceded by: Terry Falk

Personal details
- Born: July 20, 2005 (age 21)
- Party: Republican

Lukas Schubert (born July 20, 2005) is an American politician in the Montana House of Representatives. He was elected to represent the 8th district in 2024.

A member of the Republican Party, he defeated Rep.Tony Brockman in the primary. Due to redistricting following the US census, the general geographic area represented by District 8 was previously covered by District 9. Brockman was the incumbent for District 9. In the general election Schubert won 70% of the vote against challenger Beth Sibert.

== Montana House of Representatives, 2025 ==
On January 15, 2025, Schubert introduced a bill (HB222) to expand the wolf hunting season. On January 30, 2025, the bill failed to pass on the house floor, in a 40–60 vote.

On February 25, 2025, Schubert introduced a bill (HB754) to require the emergency removal of a child who is transitioning gender with the support of a parent or guardian—considering them in immediate or apparent danger of harm. On March 6, 2025, the bill failed to pass on the house floor, in a 27-71 vote.

Schubert successfully passed legislation (HB752) that creates a legal framework that allows victims of child sexual abuse (or their parents/guardians) to bring civil actions against content providers (websites and social media platforms) who make child sexual abuse material reasonably accessible in Montana. The legislation went into effect on October 1, 2025.

== Personal life ==
Schubert moved to Montana from Los Angeles with his mother in 2021 because of the restrictive Covid laws and liberal policies. He is a student at Flathead Valley Community College and graduated from Glacier High School in 2023. He converted to Catholicism before being elected to the Montana House of Representatives.
