= Donavon Hawk =

American politician and activist

Member of the Montana House of Representatives from the 76th district
- Incumbent
- Assumed office January 4, 2021
- Preceded by: Ryan Lynch

Personal details
- Born: 1981 (age 44–45) Hardin, Montana, U.S.
- Party: Democratic
- Education: Montana Technological University
- Website: www.hawkforhouse.com

Donavon Hawk is an American politician and activist serving as a member of the Montana House of Representatives from the 76th district. Elected in November 2020, he assumed office on January 4, 2021.

== Education ==
Hawk spent one year studying fashion and apparel design at the Academy of Art University in San Francisco. He then aimed to earn certificates in surgical technology and occupational safety from Montana Technological University before getting involved in political activism. Hawk spent one year studying fashion and apparel design at the Academy of Art University in San Francisco. He then aimed to earn certificates in surgical technology and occupational safety from Montana Technological University before getting involved in political activism.

== Career ==
After working as a retail manager in Washington, D.C., Hawk returned to his hometown of Butte, Montana, where he became active in local politics and activism. He worked with the Silver Bow County Democratic Party and currently serves as the treasurer of the Montana Democratic Party. Since August 2018, he has worked as the marketing and public relations coordinator for the Butte Family YMCA. Hawk was elected to the Montana House of Representatives in November 2020 and assumed office on January 4, 2021.

During the 2021 session, Hawk served as a member of the House Judiciary, Education, Local Government, and Legislative Administration Committees.

== Personal ==
Of Crow and Lakota heritage, Hawk is a member of the legislature’s Indigenous Caucus. Hawk is also openly gay.
