= Julie Darling (politician) =

American politician

Member of the Montana House of Representatives from the 70th district
- Incumbent
- Assumed office January 7, 2019
- Preceded by: Kelly Flynn

Personal details
- Born: 1971 (age 54–55) Kalispell, Montana
- Party: Republican
- Children: 1
- Occupation: Financial planner

Julie Darling (née Dooling) is a Republican member of the Montana House of Representatives who represents the 70th district. She assumed office on January 7, 2019, and her current term ends on January 1, 2023.

Darling sponsored legislation known as the Montana Museums Act of 2020, which funded the restoration of several historical sites, museums, as well as the Montana Heritage Center. The bill was signed into law in December 2019.
