= Terry Falk =

American politician

Member of the Montana House of Representatives from the 10th district
- Incumbent
- Assumed office January 6, 2025
- Preceded by: Bob Keenan

Member of the Montana House of Representatives from the 8th district
- In office January 2, 2023 – January 6, 2025
- Preceded by: John Fuller
- Succeeded by: Lukas Schubert

Personal details
- Party: Republican

Terry Falk is an American politician in the Montana House of Representatives. He was elected in 2024 to the 10th district, representing the west Kalispell area. Republican Falk defeated the Democratic candidate Devin T. Marconi with 75% of the vote. He was assigned as Chair for the Joint Appropriations Section A - General Government committee for the 2025 session.

Falk was elected to the 8th district in 2022. Redistricting following the US census caused a shift in the area representing the 8th district.
