= Tony Tezak =

Montana Senate member

Member of the Montana Senate from the 35th district
- Incumbent
- Assumed office January 6, 2025
- Preceded by: Walt Sales

Personal details
- Born: 1966 (age 59–60) Sheridan, Montana, U.S.
- Party: Republican
- Spouse: Connie
- Children: 5
- Education: Montana State University (no degree)

Tony Tezak (born 1966) is an American businessman and politician serving as a member of the Montana Senate from the 35th district. A Republican, he was elected in the 2024 election to succeed Walt Sales.

== Montana Senate ==
Tezak ran for the Montana Senate in the 2024 election, facing Mark McGinley and former state representative Ray Shaw in the Republican primary election.

Tezak introduced SB 209, which would have limited the terms of perpetual conservation easements to 40 years, but tabled the bill after strong opposition and testimony from opponents.

== Personal life ==
Tezak and his wife, Connie, were born and raised in Sheridan, Montana. He graduated from Sheridan High School and attended Montana State University, but did not graduate. They have five sons and nine grandchildren.

== Electoral history ==
=== 2024 ===
2024 Montana Senate 35th district Republican primary
Party	Candidate	Votes	%
Republican	Tony Tezak	2,260	39.38%
Republican	Ray Shaw	2,223	38.73%
Republican	Mark McGinley	1,256	21.86%
Total votes		5,739	100.00%

2024 Montana Senate 35th district general election
Party	Candidate	Votes	%
Republican	Tony Tezak	11,666	100%
Total votes		11,666	100%
Republican hold			
