= Zach Brown (politician) =

American politician (born 1990)

House of Representatives

Member of the Montana House of Representatives from the 63rd district
- In office January 6, 2015 – January 4, 2021
- Succeeded by: Alice Buckley

Personal details
- Born: Zachary James Brown; September 18, 1990 (age 35) Bozeman, Montana, U.S.
- Party: Democratic
- Spouse: Alice Buckley
- Education: University of Montana (BA)

Zachary James "Zach" Brown (born September 18, 1990) is an American politician who served as a member of the Montana House of Representatives from 2015 to 2021. He was elected to a six-year term as a Gallatin County Commissioner in 2020.

== Early life and education ==
Brown was born in Bozeman, Montana, on September 18, 1990. After graduating from Bozeman High School as a class valedictorian, he earned a Bachelor of Arts degree in environmental studies from University of Montana. As an undergraduate, he was awarded two Udall Scholarships (2011 & 2012) and a Harry S. Truman Scholarship in 2012. After graduating, he moved to Washington, D.C., for a year, working as a Madeleine Albright Fellow, which included stints at the Office of the U.S. Trade Representative and Georgetown University's Institute for the Study of International Migration.

== Career ==
Brown was elected to the Montana House of Representatives in November 2014 and assumed office in January 2015. In the 2017 legislative session, Brown was the vice chair of the House Natural Resources Committee. In the 2019–2020 session, he was vice chair of the House Taxation Committee. In 2019-20, he served as Chair of the Water Policy Interim Committee.

Brown did not seek re-election to the Montana House in 2020, instead running for a seat on the Gallatin County Commission. He was elected in November 2020. He was succeeded by his wife Alice Buckley.

Brown worked in the nonprofit sector prior to his election to the Gallatin County Commission. He has worked for One Montana, the Human Resource Development Council of Southwest Montana, and the Montana Nonprofit Association. He is also a Montana Officials Association certified basketball official.
