= John Fitzpatrick (American politician) =

American politician

Member of the Montana House of Representatives from the 77th district
- Incumbent
- Assumed office January 2, 2023
- Preceded by: Sara Novak

Personal details
- Born: Anaconda, Montana, U.S.
- Party: Republican
- Spouse: Connie
- Children: 2
- Education: University of Montana(BA); Ohio State University(MA)(PhD)

John Fitzpatrick is an American politician and author from Anaconda, Montana.

== Early life and education ==
John Fitzpatrick is a graduate of Anaconda High School. He attended the University of Montana to earn a BA in sociology. John then attended Ohio State University to earn a MA and PhD in governmental affairs and business development.

== Politics ==
John Fitzpatrick won a tight race against incumbent Sara Novak in the 2022 election for the 77th district. Fitzpatrick served on the Appropriations Committee during 2023 legislative session. He and his son Steve Fitzpatrick both served during the 2023 Montana Legislative session.

== Books ==
John Fitzpatrick is a published author. His works include:

- Fitzpatrick, John S. (2008). Sherlock Holmes: The Montana Chronicles. Riverbend. ISBN 978-1931832960.
- Fitzpatrick, John S. (2019). Sherlock Holmes: Adventures in the Wild West. Riverbend. ISBN 978-1606391136.
