= Jim Hamilton (politician) =

American politician

Member of the Montana House of Representatives from the 61st district
- In office January 2, 2017 – 2025
- Succeeded by: Becky Edwards

Personal details
- Born: August 29, 1959 (age 66) Albuquerque, New Mexico
- Party: Democratic
- Children: 2
- Education: Eastern Michigan University

Jim Hamilton is an American politician, serving in the Montana House of Representatives since 2017. A member of the Democratic Party, Hamilton represents District 61.

Hamilton ran for re-election to a fourth term in the 2022 Montana House of Representatives election.

== Montana House of Representatives ==
=== Tenure ===
Early in 2017, Hamilton supported increasing the tobacco tax by $1.50 per pack of cigarettes. The bill failed to pass out of the tax committee.

Hamilton opposed the tax plan put forward by national members of the Republican Party in 2017, arguing that these would worsen the state's deficit. This came after legislators from the Montana Republican Party dramatically curbed spending in the state to make up for budget shortfalls.

In 2021, Hamilton co-sponsored a "move over, slow down" bill to strengthen laws protecting first responders directing traffic, after two tow truck operators were killed in an accident. He also opposed a push by Republican state legislators to impose a strict dress code in the House of Representatives, which would have mandated suits and ties.

=== Committee assignments ===
- Appropriations Committee
- Joint Interim Committee on Revenue
- Joint Legislative Finance Committee
- Joint Subcommittee on Long-Range Planning
- Legislative Administration Committee (Vice Chair)
- Rules Committee

== Personal life ==
Hamilton resides in Bozeman, Montana. He is married, and has two children.

== Electoral history ==
=== 2016 ===
Montana House of Representatives 61st district general election, 2016
Party	Candidate	Votes	%
Democratic	Jim Hamilton	3,787	55.06%
Republican	Neal Ganser	2,804	40.77%
Libertarian	Francis Wendt	287	4.17%
Total votes		6,878	100%
Democratic hold			

=== 2018 ===
Montana House of Representatives 61st district general election, 2016
Party	Candidate	Votes	%
Democratic	Jim Hamilton (incumbent)	4,906	74.9%
Libertarian	A. Alexander Fetto	1,648	25.1%
Total votes		6,554	100%
Democratic hold			

=== 2020 ===
Montana House of Representatives 61st district general election, 2020
Party	Candidate	Votes	%
Democratic	Jim Hamilton (incumbent)	6,200	100%
Total votes		6,200	100%
Democratic hold			
