= Dave Fern =

American politician from Montana

Member of the Montana Senate from the 2nd district
- Incumbent
- Assumed office January 6, 2025
- Preceded by: Carl Glimm

Member of the Montana House of Representatives from the 5th district
- In office January 2, 2017 – January 6, 2025
- Preceded by: Ed Lieser
- Succeeded by: Debo Powers (redistricted)

Personal details
- Party: Democratic
- Spouse: Heather Fern
- Children: 3

Dave B. Fern is an American politician from Montana who has served as a member of the Montana Senate from 2025 to the present, representing the 2nd district. He previously served in the Montana House of Representatives from the 5th district from 2017 to 2025.

== Career ==
Fern has served on the Whitefish School District board of trustees.

On November 8, 2016, Fern won the election and became a Democratic member of Montana House of Representatives for District 5. Fern defeated Chet Billi with 56.74% of the votes. On November 6, 2018, as an incumbent, Fern won the election and continued serving District 5. Fern defeated Cindy Dyson with 69.12% of the votes.

== Personal life ==
Fern's wife is Heather Fern. They have three children. Fern and his family live in Whitefish, Montana.
