= Edward Butcher =

American politician

The Honorable

Member of the Montana House of Representatives from the 29th district
- Incumbent
- Assumed office January 14, 2023
- Preceded by: Doug Flament

Member of the Montana House of Representatives from the 29th district
- In office 2005–2009

Member of the Montana Senate from the 47th district
- In office 2001–2003

Personal details
- Party: Republican
- Education: Graduate degree
- Alma mater: Eastern Montana College, University of Montana
- Profession: Rancher

Edward Butcher is an American politician who has served as a member of the Montana House of Representatives since January 2, 2023. He previously served in the senate from 2001 to 2003, and the house from 2005 to 2009. He was appointed to his current seat after his predecessor Doug Flament resigned. He was a delegate in the 2016 United States presidential election for Montana and supported Donald Trump.

== Biography ==
Butcher earned a degree from Eastern Montana College in 1965 and a graduate degree from the University of Montana in 1967.

== Controversy ==
Butcher runs a website known as legislatorloyalty.com, which ranks members of the Montana Legislature by how they vote with or against the Montana Republican Party. He has made disparaging comments towards Native American legislators, receiving criticism from Native American Rep. Margarett Campbell.

“I won’t mention the other names that are room-temperature IQs, the reservation doesn’t necessarily always send their best and brightest.”

— Edward Butcher
