= Curtis Cochran =

American politician

Member of the Montana House of Representatives from the 90 district
- Incumbent
- Assumed office January 6, 2025
- Preceded by: Marilyn Marler

Personal details
- Born: 1955 or 1956 (age 69–70) Thompson Falls, Montana
- Party: Republican

Curtis Cochran is an American politician. He is a member of the Montana House of Representatives for the 90th district.

== Life ==
Cochran graduated from Helena High School. He also attended University of Montana and Green River College. He worked in the timber industry as a forester for Tri-Con Timber. He worked in family businesses in mining, construction, and tourism. He is a volunteer high school football coach.
