= Randyn Gregg =

American politician (born 1991)

Member of the Montana House of Representatives from the 78th district
- Incumbent
- Assumed office January 6, 2025
- Preceded by: Gregory Frazer

Personal details
- Born: 1991 (age 34–35)
- Party: Republican

Randyn Gregg (born 1991) is an American politician who was elected member of the Montana House of Representatives for the 78th district in 2024. A member of the Republican Party, he defeated incumbent James Bergstrom in the primary. He previously ran in the 2022 election and was defeated by Bergstrom in the primary.
