= Luke Muszkiewicz =

American politician

Member of the Montana House of Representatives from the 79th district
- Incumbent
- Assumed office January 6, 2025
- Preceded by: Laura Smith

Personal details
- Born: 1978 (age 47–48) Helena, Montana
- Party: Democratic
- Spouse: Virginia Reeves
- Children: 2
- Education: Carroll College
- Website: Campaign website Legislative website

Luke Muszkiewicz (born is an American politician who is serving as a member of the Montana House of Representatives.

== Career ==
Muszkiewicz graduated from Helena High School in 1996 and earned a bachelor's degree in Computer Science from Carroll College in 2000. He has worked as a software engineer and data analyst. He served on the Helena Public Schools Board of Trustees from 2017 to 2023.

== Personal life ==
Muszkiewicz is married to Virginia Reeves and has two children. He resides in Helena.
