= Greg Overstreet =

American lawyer and politician

Member of the Montana House of Representatives from the 88th district
- Incumbent
- Assumed office January 6, 2025
- Preceded by: Wayne Rusk

Personal details
- Born: 1967 (age 58–59) Vancouver
- Party: Republican
- Spouse: Anne Marie Gurney
- Children: 2
- Website: Campaign website

Greg Overstreet is an American politician who is a member of the Montana House of Representatives for the 88th district.

== Early life ==
Overstreet is an enrolled member of the Muscogee nation; his great grandfather Rev. Noah Gregory was an early 20th century member of the Creek Legislature. Overstreet earned a Bachelor of Arts in Russian and Eastern European regional studies from the University of Washington in 1989, and a Juris Doctor degree from the Seattle University School of Law in 1993.

He worked as an attorney for 30 years. He wrote laws for a former Republican Attorney General. He announces high school football at Stevensville High School. He is the Stevensville town attorney.

== Personal life ==
Overstreet is married to Anne Gurney and has two children.
