= Emma Kerr-Carpenter =

American politician

Member of the Montana Senate
- Incumbent
- Assumed office January 6, 2025
- Preceded by: Tom McGillvray
- Constituency: 23rd
- In office December 3, 2024 – January 6, 2025
- Preceded by: Kathy Kelker
- Succeeded by: Mike Yakawich
- Constituency: 24th

Member of the Montana House of Representatives from the 49th district
- In office July 10, 2018 – December 3, 2024
- Preceded by: Kelly McCarthy
- Succeeded by: Denise Joy

Personal details
- Born: Watertown, New York, U.S.
- Party: Democratic
- Education: Boston University (BA)

Emma Kerr-Carpenter is an American politician serving as a member of the Montana Senate from the 23rd district. She was appointed in December 2024 to succeed Kathy Kelker in the 24th district before a successor came in January 2025. She previously served in the Montana House of Representatives, representing the 49th district following her appointment on July 10, 2018 to succeed Kelly McCarthy.

== Early life and education ==
Kerr-Carpenter was born in Watertown, New York. She earned a Bachelor of Arts degree in international relations and religion from Boston University.

== Career ==
After graduating from college, Kerr-Carpenter taught English in Belo Horizonte, Brazil. She then relocated to Billings, Montana, where she became a family support specialist for the Family Support Network. She joined Youth Dynamics of Montana in 2015 as a youth case manager and has since worked as the organization's marketing and education coordinator. In 2018, when incumbent representative Kelly McCarthy announced that he was moving to Australia, Kerr-Carpenter was appointed to fill his vacant seat in the Montana House of Representatives. She won a full term in November 2018 and was re-elected in 2020.

== Personal life ==
Kerr-Carpenter lives in Billings, Montana with her husband, Dan.
