= Naarah Hastings =

Montana state representative

Member of the Montana House of Representatives from the 50th district
- In office January 24, 2023 – January 5, 2025
- Preceded by: Mallerie Stromswold
- Succeeded by: Anthony Nicastro

Personal details
- Born: Naarah Nethanieh Hanson; May 6, 1975 (age 51) Hennepin County, Minnesota, United States
- Party: Republican

Naarah Nethanieh Hastings (née Hanson) is an American business owner and politician who is currently serving as a Member of the Montana House of Representatives from the 50th district. She is a member of the Republican Party.

== Political career ==
The previous representative of the 50th district, Representative Mallerie Stromswold, resigned from her position on January 17, 2023, citing logistical challenges and backlash from her party. After a week of vacancy, Hastings was interviewed by the Yellowstone County Republican Central Committee alongside two other candidates – local attorney Anthony Nicastro as well as former Yellowstone County commissioner and city councilman Denis Pitman. After a close competition between herself and Nicastro, she received votes from all three county commissioners, being appointed as the new Representative from the 50th district for the Montana House of Representatives. She was sworn into office on January 24, 2023, by District Court Judge Ashley Harada at Helena.

== Personal life ==
Hastings lives with her husband, Jason, and their four children in Billings. Together, Hastings and her husband co-own Proof Donuts & Coffee, while Hastings herself is a founder of 6H Talent, a talent acquisition firm. She is an alumna of the University of Phoenix, graduating with a Bachelor of Business Administration in 2002. After the birth of their children, the Hastings family moved from Washington to Billings due to the political climate of Washington, which Hastings stated "would not allow her to raise her four children with the values her family espouses".
