= Tony Brockman =

American politician

Member of the Montana House of Representatives from the 9th district
- Incumbent
- Assumed office January 2, 2023

Personal details
- Party: Republican

Tony Brockman is an American politician. He serves as a Republican member for the 9th district of the Montana House of Representatives.
