= Alice Buckley (politician) =

American politician

Member of the Montana House of Representatives from the 63rd district
- Incumbent
- Assumed office January 4, 2021
- Preceded by: Zach Brown

Personal details
- Born: 1992 or 1993 (age 32–33)
- Party: Democratic
- Spouse: Zach Brown
- Education: Yale University (BA)

Alice Buckley is an American politician serving as a member of the Montana House of Representatives from the 63rd district. Elected in November 2020, she assumed office on January 4, 2021. During her tenure, Buckley has sponsored legislation to allow candidates to use campaign funds for childcare expenses.

== Early life and education ==
Buckley was raised in California. After graduating from The College Preparatory School in Oakland, California, she earned a Bachelor of Arts degree in environmental studies from Yale University.

== Career ==
After graduating from Yale in 2015, Buckley moved to Bozeman, Montana, where she first worked as a program manager at Future West, a non-profit organization. In 2016 and 2017, she worked as the managing director of Yellowstone Grassfed Beef. Since 2017, she has worked as the associate director of Profitable Ideas Exchange, a consultancy firm. Buckley was elected to the Montana House of Representatives in November 2020 and assumed office on January 4, 2021. During her tenure, Buckley has sponsored legislation to allow candidates to use campaign funds for childcare expenses.

== Personal life ==
Buckley's husband is Zach Brown, who she succeeded in the Montana House.
