= Nelly Nicol =

American politician

Member of the Montana House of Representatives from the 53rd district
- Incumbent
- Assumed office January 2, 2023
- Preceded by: Dennis Lenz

Personal details
- Party: Republican
- Education: Montana State University Billings (BS)
- Profession: Insurance

Nelly Nicol is an American politician. She serves as a Republican member for the 53rd district of the Montana House of Representatives from Billings, Montana. She unsuccessfully ran for state auditor in 2020.

Nicol currently works for Victory Insurance Company, Inc.

== Early life ==
Nicol attended Billings West High School and received a Bachelor of Science in public relations, advertising, and applied communicaiton from Montana State University Billings.

== Personal life ==
She and her husband Bill have four children.
