= Anthony Nicastro =

American politician

Member of the Montana House of Representatives from the 50th district
- Incumbent
- Assumed office June 6, 2025

Personal details
- Born: Winston-Salem, North Carolina
- Party: Republican
- Spouse: Jaime
- Children: 3
- Education: Wake Forest University (BA), (JD)
- Occupation: Attorney

Anthony Nicastro is an American politician serving as a Republican member of the Montana House of Representatives representing the 50th district. He is an attorney.

== Early life ==
Nicastro attended Wake Forest University and earned a Bachelor of Arts in politics in 2001, and a Juris Doctor in 2005.

== Personal life ==
Nicastro and his wife Jamie have three children and reside in Billings, Montana.
