= Kathy Love (politician) =

American politician

Member of the Montana House of Representatives from the 85th district
- Incumbent
- Assumed office January 6, 2025
- Preceded by: Michele Binkley

Personal details
- Born: 1958 (age 67–68)
- Party: Republican

Kathy Love (born 1958) is an American politician and former dental hygienist serving as a member of the Montana House of Representatives from the 85th district since 2025. Elected in 2024, she defeated incumbent representative Michele Binkley in the Republican primary.

== Career ==
Love founded Love2Shoot, a firearms training program geared towards women.

=== Montana House of Representatives ===
Love defeated incumbent representative Michele Binkley in the Republican primary in 2024. She had the backing of the Montana Freedom Caucus's political action committee.

Love sponsored House Bill 82, which passed the house in 2025 and would revise and clarify laws concerning sex crimes against children to include sexual grooming.

She supported legislation to restrict bathroom use to defined male or female.

She spoke in support of legislation that would have banned the use of COVID-19 vaccines and other mRNA vaccines.
