= Barry Usher =

American politician

Majority Whip of the Montana House of Representatives
- Incumbent
- Assumed office January 4, 2021

Member of the Montana House of Representatives from the 40th district
- Incumbent
- Assumed office January 2, 2017
- Preceded by: Tom Berry

Personal details
- Born: 1965 (age 60–61) Chambersburg, Pennsylvania, U.S.
- Party: Republican
- Spouse: Ann Marie
- Children: 4
- Education: University of Maryland University College
- Occupation: Business owner

Military service
- Branch/service: United States Coast Guard
- Rank: Boatswain's Mate 2nd Class

Barry M. Usher is an American politician in the Montana Senate. He served as a member of the Montana House of Representatives from the 40th district. Elected in November 2016, he assumed office in January 2017. Since January 2021, Usher has served as the majority whip of the House.

== Career ==
Usher previously served in the United States Coast Guard on the USCGC Steadfast (WMEC-623) and became a Boatswain Mate 2nd Class. He also worked in law enforcement before establishing a small business. Usher and his wife, Ann Marie Murphy Usher, have four children. Usher lives in Yellowstone County, Montana.
