= 2026 Montana House of Representatives election =

- November 3, 2026

All 100 seats in the Montana House of Representatives 51 seats needed for a majority
- Turnout: 57.8%
	Majority party	Minority party
Leader	Brandon Ler	Katie Sullivan (term-limited)
Party	Republican	Democratic
Leader since	January 6, 2025	January 6, 2025
Leader's seat	33rd	89th
Last election	58	42
Seats won	56	44
Seat change	▼2	▲2
Popular vote	256,118	208,509
Percentage	54.74%	44.56%
Swing	▼7.55%	▲7.97%
- Results: Democratic gain Republican hold Democratic hold
Speaker before election
Brandon Ler
Republican
Elected Speaker
Katie Zolnikov
Republican

The 2026 Montana House of Representatives election was held on November 3, 2026, alongside the other 2026 United States elections. Voters elected members of the Montana House of Representatives in all 100 of the U.S. state of Montana's legislative districts to serve a two-year term.

== Retirements ==
=== Republican ===
1. District 1: Neil Duram is term-limited.
2. District 18: Llew Jones is term-limited.
3. District 21: Edward Buttrey is term-limited.
4. District 52: Bill Mercer is term-limited.
5. District 84: Julie Darling is term-limited.
6. District 86: David Bedey is term-limited.

=== Democratic ===
1. District 16: Tyson Running Wolf is term-limited.
2. District 81: Mary Caferro is term-limited.
3. District 83: Jill Cohenour is term-limited.
4. District 92: Connie Keogh is term-limited.
5. District 93: Katie Sullivan is term-limited.
6. District 94: Marilyn Marler is term-limited.

== Predictions ==
Source	Ranking	As of
Sabato's Crystal Ball	Safe R	January 22, 2026
State Navigate	Safe R	October 24, 2026

== Crossover seats ==
This is a list of seats that voted for one party in the 2024 presidential election and another in the 2024 house election.

=== Democratic ===
This lists the districts which Donald Trump won in 2024 that are represented by Democrats:

District		Incumbent				
#	Trump margin of victory in 2024	Member	Party	First elected	Incumbent margin of victory in 2024	Incumbent status
19	R+0.6	Jane Weber	Democratic	2024	D+9.3	Running
27	R+20.2	Paul Tuss	Democratic	2022	D+5.2	Running
42	R+7.7	Sidney Fitzpatrick	Democratic	2024	D+4.3	Running
46	R+1.8	Denise Joy	Democratic	2024 (Note: Originally appointed)	D+6.0	Running
71	R+0.02	Scott DeMarois	Democratic	2024	D+23.7	Running
80	R+0.2	Melissa Romano	Democratic	2022	D+7.6	Running

== Primary election summary ==
Primary results sourced from the Montana Secretary of State Web site. Results are unofficial with more than 99% of precincts fully reported.

=== Republican primaries ===
==== Contested primaries ====
District	Nominee			Runners-up						Total		
District	Candidate	Votes	%	Candidate	Votes	%	Candidate	Votes	%	Votes	Maj.	Mrg.
3rd	Derek Peachey	817	53.82%	Cathy Mitchell	701	46.18%	—	—	—	1,518	116	7.64%
4th	Shaun Pandina	877	64.96%	Lyn Bennett (inc.)	306	22.67%	Nathan Purdy	167	12.37%	1,350	571	42.30%
6th	Jim Riley	1,557	67.03%	Arthur Dunn	766	32.97%	—	—	—	2,323	791	34.05%
7th	Courtenay Sprunger (inc.)	819	64.18%	Luke Maxwell	457	35.82%	—	—	—	1,276	362	28.37%
13th	Finley Warden	1,611	64.62%	Linda Reksten (inc.)	882	35.38%	—	—	—	2,493	729	29.24%
17th	Justin W. Cleveland	1,781	57.60%	Susan Geise	730	23.61%	Michael J. Fasbender	581	18.79%	3,092	1,051	33.99%
19th	Hannah Trebas	455	64.72%	Derren Auger	248	35.28%	—	—	—	703	207	29.45%
20th	Melissa Nikolakakos (inc.)	841	58.00%	Tony Rosales	609	42.00%	—	—	—	1,450	232	16.00%
21st	Trevor P. Funseth	1,152	59.66%	Eric Peterson	779	40.34%	—	—	—	1,931	373	19.32%
22nd	Jason Lorang	640	68.30%	Kevin Leatherbarrow	297	31.70%	—	—	—	937	343	36.61%
23rd	Eric Tilleman (inc.)	839	64.34%	Brett Mills	465	35.66%	—	—	—	1,304	374	28.68%
28th	Chisholm Christensen	2,029	72.31%	John South	777	27.69%	—	—	—	2,806	1,252	44.62%
29th	Valerie Moore (inc.)	1,744	61.73%	Linda Harmon	1,081	38.27%	—	—	—	2,825	663	23.47%
33rd	Brandon Ler (inc.)	1,673	56.46%	Ric Holden	1,290	43.54%	—	—	—	2,963	383	12.93%
34th	Jerry Schillinger (inc.)	2,952	85.94%	Jason Ellsworth	483	14.06%	—	—	—	3,435	2,469	71.88%
36th	Ty Linger	1,596	81.64%	Loren Hinebauch	359	18.36%	—	—	—	1,955	1,237	63.27%
40th	Mike Vinton (inc.)	1,021	67.80%	Gunner Cesnik	485	32.20%	—	—	—	1,506	536	35.59%
47th	John Maxwell	284	58.92%	Ron J. Stevens	198	41.08%	—	—	—	482	86	17.84%
49th	Charlie Loveridge	951	71.77%	Ole Hedstrom	374	28.23%	—	—	—	1,325	577	43.55%
51st	Jodee Etchart (inc.)	1,146	72.39%	Lana Marie Tibbetts	437	27.61%	—	—	—	1,583	709	44.79%
52nd	Stacy Zinn (inc.)	1,504	61.31%	Ed Walker	949	38.69%	—	—	—	2,453	555	22.63%
53rd	Troy Charbonneau	1,145	56.91%	Nelly Nicol (inc.)	867	43.09%	—	—	—	2,012	278	13.82%
55th	Brad Barker (inc.)	1,932	63.68%	Mary Horman	1,102	36.32%	—	—	—	3,034	830	27.36%
67th	Jedediah Hinkle (inc.)	1,073	70.55%	Russell C. Nelson	448	29.45%	—	—	—	1,521	625	41.09%
68th	Randy Chamberlin	1,111	59.06%	Jennifer Carlson	770	40.94%	—	—	—	1,881	341	18.13%
69th	Trevor Walter	1,657	53.11%	Ken Walsh (inc.)	1,463	46.89%	—	—	—	3,120	194	6.22%
76th	Trish Schreiber	1,816	60.51%	John Fitzpatrick (inc.)	1,185	39.49%	—	—	—	3,001	631	21.03%
84th	Roy Caldwell	1,374	61.98%	James Marshal	843	38.02%	—	—	—	2,217	531	23.95%
85th	Kim Dailey	1,877	56.93%	Michele Binkley	1,420	43.07%	—	—	—	3,297	457	13.86%
86th	Wayne Rusk	1,636	61.37%	Kenneth E. Allen	1,030	38.63%	—	—	—	2,666	606	22.73%
90th	Jeff Stanek	1,686	61.92%	Curtis Cochran (inc.)	1,037	38.08%	—	—	—	2,723	649	23.83%

==== Nominated without opposition ====
- District 1: Michelle Bianco received 2,397 votes.
- District 2: Tom Millett (inc.) received 2,217 votes.
- District 5: Braxton Mitchell (inc.) received 1,932 votes.
- District 8: Lukas Schubert (inc.) received 1,869 votes.
- District 9: Steven Kelly (inc.) received 1,925 votes.
- District 10: Terry Falk (inc.) received 1,719 votes.
- District 11: Ed Byrne (inc.) received 2,390 votes.
- District 12: Tracy Sharp (inc.) received 2,118 votes.
- District 14: Paul Fielder (inc.) received 2,387 votes.
- District 15: Ralph Foster received 604 votes.
- District 18: Butch Gillespie received 2,769 votes.
- District 24: Steve Fitzpatrick (inc.) received 1,441 votes.
- District 25: Steve Gist (inc.) received 1,749 votes.
- District 26: Russ Miner (inc.) received 2,420 votes.
- District 30: Morgan Thiel (inc.) received 1,961 votes.
- District 35: Gary Parry (inc.) received 2,447 votes.
- District 37: Shane Klakken (inc.) received 2,699 votes.
- District 38: Greg Oblander (inc.) received 2,676 votes.
- District 39: Kerri Seekins-Crowe (inc.) received 1,195 votes.
- District 42: Jeremiah Jabs received 623 votes.
- District 43: Larry Brewster received 1,138 votes.
- District 44: Katie Zolnikov received 1,434 votes.
- District 45: Bryce Walston received 947 votes.
- District 46: Kim Welzenbach received 819 votes.
- District 48: Curtis Schomer (inc.) received 801 votes.
- District 50: Stewart Harris received 1,661 votes.
- District 54: Lee Deming (inc.) received 1,318 votes.
- District 56: Fiona Nave (inc.) received 2,553 votes.
- District 57: Bob Crank received 1,422 votes.
- District 58: Joshua Congleton received 967 votes.
- District 59: Marc Greendorfer received 1,070 votes.
- District 60: Greg Leman received 1,078 votes.
- District 61: Eric Jacobs received 117 votes.
- District 62: Esther Fishbaugh received 792 votes.
- District 63: Lawrence R. Moore received 664 votes.
- District 64: Daniel Ricardo Martinez received 721 votes.
- District 65: Joe Flynn received 953 votes.
- District 66: Owen Lang received 1,073 votes.
- District 70: Shannon Maness (inc.) received 2123 votes.
- District 71: Suzzann Nordwick received 851 votes.
- District 72: Michael Saul received 583 votes.
- District 73: Gerry Kennedy received 493 votes.
- District 74: Trenin Bayless received 912 votes.
- District 75: Mark Reinschmidt (inc.) received 1,881 votes.
- District 77: Jane Gillette (inc.) received 2,046 votes.
- District 78: Randyn Gregg (inc.) received 2,347 votes.
- District 79: Chiko Olson received 1,158 votes.
- District 80: Katie Fruits received 963 votes.
- District 81: John J. Looney Sr. received 1,042 votes.
- District 82: Clinton Mckay received 874 votes.
- District 83: Aaron J. Leas received 1,098 votes.
- District 87: Terry Nelson (inc.) received 2,113 votes.
- District 88: Greg Overstreet (inc.) received 2,038 votes.
- District 89: Lyn Hellegaard received 1,040 votes.
- District 91: Charles Headley received 981 votes.
- District 93: Roy Handley received 873 votes.
- District 94: Greg Woodward received 1,037 votes.
- District 97: Michael P Hagestad received 790 votes.
- District 98: Bryan Muzzana received 713 votes.
- District 99: Ryan Darling received 820 votes.
- District 100: Michael Daniel Bowles received 286 votes.

=== Democratic primaries ===
==== Contested primaries ====
District	Nominee			Runners-up						Total		
District	Candidate	Votes	%	Candidate	Votes	%	Candidate	Votes	%	Votes	Maj.	Mrg.
1st	Dakota V. Adams	501	62.31%	Roberta McCanse	303	37.69%	—	—	—	804	198	24.63%
15th	Thedis Crowe (inc.)	568	62.62%	Adrien Owen Wagner	339	37.38%	—	—	—	907	229	25.25%
29th	Tess Fahlgren	197	53.10%	Rachel Sundheim	174	46.90%	—	—	—	371	23	6.20%
31st	Natalie Oneal	402	59.91%	Lance Elliot Fourstar	269	40.09%	—	—	—	671	133	19.82%
46th	Denise Joy (inc.)	677	60.07%	Erin R. Tate	450	39.93%	—	—	—	1,127	227	20.14%
61st	Rio Roland	540	62.36%	Chris Gray	326	37.64%	—	—	—	866	214	24.71%
80th	Megan Lane	898	61.68%	Qasim W. Abdul-Baki	558	38.32%	—	—	—	1,456	340	23.35%
81st	Janet Ellis	1,237	63.37%	Benjamin Kuiper	715	36.63%	—	—	—	1,952	522	26.74%
84th	Tia Nelson	596	52.05%	Jamie Van Valkenburg	549	47.95%	—	—	—	1,145	47	4.10%
92nd	Monica Tranel	1,461	60.82%	Reggie Spaulding	941	39.18%	—	—	—	2,402	520	21.65%
93rd	Ben Davis	1,029	41.24%	Nick Kujawa	845	33.87%	Sam Kulla	621	24.89%	2,495	184	7.37%
94th	Robin Kendall	1,173	50.47%	Lisa Verlanic Fowler	1,151	49.53%	—	—	—	2,324	22	0.95%

==== Nominated without opposition ====
- District 2: Jane Maahs received 576 votes.
- District 3: Debo Powers (inc.) received 1,506 votes.
- District 4: Paula Koch received 1,076 votes.
- District 5: Luca Welle received 646 votes.
- District 6: Darren Fix received 924 votes.
- District 7: Madison Evans received 780 votes.
- District 8: Calvin Lime received 650 votes.
- District 9: Kate Mclaughlin received 721 votes.
- District 10: Catherine C. Allen received 549 votes.
- District 11: Maeve Kintzler received 674 votes.
- District 12: Cindy L Bruckner received 1,059 votes.
- District 13: Dalton Bradford received 910 votes.
- District 14: Colleen Hinds received 800 votes.
- District 16: Lona Running Wolf received 1,112 votes.
- District 17: Chris Bechtold received 627 votes.
- District 19: Jane Weber (inc.) received 742 votes.
- District 20: Steve Keller received 1,070 votes.
- District 21: Lela Graham received 915 votes.
- District 22: Neal Miller received 587 votes.
- District 23: Rebecca Bogden-Richards received 930 votes.
- District 24: Pam Carroll received 919 votes.
- District 25: Jerry Ferderer received 640 votes.
- District 26: Paul Jefferson received 754 votes.
- District 27: Paul Tuss (inc.) received 1,032 votes.
- District 30: Jason Boeshore received 215 votes.
- District 32: Mike Fox (inc.) received 599 votes.
- District 33: Tristan Veverka received 330 votes.
- District 34: Jasmine Erickson received 189 votes.
- District 35: Natalie Parker received 391 votes.
- District 36: Benjamin Keyes received 540 votes.
- District 37: Tracey Miller Karcher received 599 votes.
- District 39: Melissa Smith received 674 votes.
- District 40: Gabriel Bradshaw received 494 votes.
- District 41: Jade Sooktis (inc.) received 527 votes.
- District 42: Sidney Fitzpatrick (inc.) received 688 votes.
- District 43: Rudolf Haden received 738 votes.
- District 44: Mike Eaton received 705 votes.
- District 45: Denise Baum (inc.) received 1,073 votes.
- District 47: James Reavis (inc.) received 617 votes.
- District 48: Tucker Colvin received 795 votes.
- District 49: Rebecca Noell received 908 votes.
- District 50: Mark Peters received 839 votes.
- District 51: Precious Mckenzie received 906 votes.
- District 52: Elizabeth Heald received 1,045 votes.
- District 53: Matthew J Hankins received 621 votes.
- District 54: Janine Coole received 598 votes.
- District 55: Richard Gessling received 827 votes.
- District 57: Jordan Viegut received 1,574 votes.
- District 58: Jamie Isaly (inc.) received 1,598 votes.
- District 59: Katie Fire Thunder (inc.) received 2,120 votes.
- District 60: Alanah Griffith (inc.) received 1,237 votes.
- District 62: Josh Seckinger (inc.) received 1,090 votes.
- District 63: Peter Strand (inc.) received 1,248 votes.
- District 64: Brady Bremer received 1,212 votes.
- District 65: Brian Close (inc.) received 1,408 votes.
- District 66: Eric Matthews (inc.) received 1,814 votes.
- District 67: Logan Henke received 714 votes.
- District 68: Jocelyn Kent received 588 votes.
- District 70: Kobi Craddock received 656 votes.
- District 71: Scott DeMarois (inc.) received 1,651 votes.
- District 72: Donavon Hawk (inc.) received 1,587 votes.
- District 73: Jennifer Lynch (inc.) received 1,315 votes.
- District 74: Marc Lee (inc.) received 1,941 votes.
- District 75: Patrick Sullivan received 1,080 votes.
- District 77: Deborah Anne Hansen received 621 votes.
- District 78: Mark White received 577 votes.
- District 79: Luke Muszkiewicz (inc.) received 1,961 votes.
- District 82: Pete Elverum (inc.) received 1,563 votes.
- District 83: Joe Cohenour received 1,797 votes.
- District 85: Laura Jackson received 679 votes.
- District 86: Archie Thomas received 877 votes.
- District 87: Bill Jones received 791 votes.
- District 88: Evan Schroedel received 1,043 votes.
- District 89: Mark Thane (inc.) received 1,691 votes.
- District 91: Shelly Fyant (inc.) received 1,495 votes.
- District 95: Zooey Zephyr (inc.) received 2,665 votes.
- District 96: Bob Carter (inc.) received 1,804 votes.
- District 97: Melody Cunningham (inc.) received 1,800 votes.
- District 98: Jonathan Karlen (inc.) received 1,623 votes.
- District 99: Tom France (inc.) received 1,737 votes.
- District 100: SJ Howell (inc.) received 2,070 votes.

=== Libertarian primaries ===
==== Nominated without opposition ====
- District 22: Dave Von Eschen received 20 votes.
- District 27: Jordan Ophus received 24 votes.
- District 75: Greg DeVries received 103 votes.
- District 100: JC Windmueller received 18 votes.

== Results summary ==
2026 Montana House of Representatives election General election — November 3, 2026
Party	Votes	Percentage	Seats	+/–
Republican	256,118	54.74	56	▼2
Democratic	208,509	44.56	44	▲2
Independents	1,816	0.39	0	0
Libertarian	1,465	0.31	0	0
Totals	467,908	100	100	—

== District 1 ==
The 1st district is represented by Republican Neil Duram, who is term-limited and cannot run for re-election to another term. Instead he ran in the Republican primary for Senate District 1, but lost.

Montana House of Representatives 1st district general election, 2026
Party	Candidate	Votes	%
Republican	Michelle Bianco	4,476	76.12%
Democratic	Dakota Adams	1,404	23.88%
Total votes		5,880	100%
Republican hold			

== District 2 ==
The 2nd district is represented by Republican Tom Millett, who has represented the district since 2025.

Montana House of Representatives 2nd district general election, 2026
Party	Candidate	Votes	%
Republican	Tom Millett (incumbent)	3,763	75.32%
Democratic	Jane Maahs	1,233	24.68%
Total votes		4,996	100%
Republican hold			

== District 3 ==
The 3rd district is represented by Democrat Debo Powers, who has represented the district since 2025 and who previously represented the district from 2019 to 2021.

Montana House of Representatives 3rd district general election, 2026
Party	Candidate	Votes	%
Democratic	Debo Powers (incumbent)	3,431	54.63%
Republican	Derek Peachey	2,849	45.37%
Total votes		6,280	100%
Democratic hold			

== District 4 ==
The 4th district was represented by Republican Lyn Bennett, who was defeated in the June primary by Shaun Pandina. She had represented the district from 2025 to 2027.

Montana House of Representatives 4th district general election, 2026
Party	Candidate	Votes	%
Democratic	Paula Koch	2,797	54.50%
Republican	Shaun Pandina	2,335	45.50%
Total votes		5,132	100%
Democratic gain from Republican			

== District 5 ==
The 5th district is represented by Republican Braxton Mitchell, who has represented the district since 2025 and who previously represented District 3 from 2021 to 2025.

Montana House of Representatives 5th district general election, 2026
Party	Candidate	Votes	%
Republican	Braxton Mitchell (incumbent)	3,790	70.74%
Democratic	Luca Welle	1,568	29.26%
Total votes		5,358	100%
Republican hold			

== District 6 ==
The 6th district was represented by Republican Amy Regier, who ran for election in Senate District 4.

Montana House of Representatives 6th district general election, 2026
Party	Candidate	Votes	%
Republican	Jim Riley	4,091	63.32%
Democratic	Darren Fix	2,370	36.68%
Total votes		6,461	100%
Republican hold			

== District 7 ==
The 7th district is represented by Republican Courtenay Sprunger, who has represented the district since 2023.

Montana House of Representatives 7th district general election, 2026
Party	Candidate	Votes	%
Republican	Courtenay Sprunger (incumbent)	2,195	55.77%
Democratic	Madison Evans	1,741	44.23%
Total votes		3,936	100%
Republican hold			

== District 8 ==
The 8th district is represented by Republican Lukas Schubert, who has represented the district since 2025.

Montana House of Representatives 8th district general election, 2026
Party	Candidate	Votes	%
Republican	Lukas Schubert (incumbent)	3,135	67.14%
Democratic	Calvin Lime	1,534	32.86%
Total votes		4,669	100%
Republican hold			

== District 9 ==
The 9th district is represented by Republican Steven Kelly, who has represented the district since 2025.

Montana House of Representatives 9th district general election, 2026
Party	Candidate	Votes	%
Republican	Steven Kelly (incumbent)	3,730	69.29%
Democratic	Kate McLaughlin	1,653	30.71%
Total votes		5,383	100%
Republican hold			

== District 10 ==
The 10th district is represented by Republican Terry Falk, who has represented the district since 2025, and who represented the 8th District from 2023 to 2025.

Montana House of Representatives 10th district general election, 2026
Party	Candidate	Votes	%
Republican	Terry Falk (incumbent)	3,288	68.54%
Democratic	Catherine Allen	1,509	31.46%
Total votes		4,797	100%
Republican hold			

== District 11 ==
The 11th district is represented by Republican Ed Byrne, who has represented the district since 2025.

Montana House of Representatives 11th district general election, 2026
Party	Candidate	Votes	%
Republican	Ed Byrne (incumbent)	4,510	75.35%
Democratic	Maeve Kintzler	1,475	24.64%
Total votes		5,985	100%
Republican hold			

== District 12 ==
The 12th district is represented by Republican Tracy Sharp, who has represented the district since 2025.

Montana House of Representatives 12th district general election, 2026
Party	Candidate	Votes	%
Republican	Tracy Sharp (incumbent)	4,200	66.00%
Democratic	Cindy Bruckner	2,164	34.00%
Total votes		6,364	100%
Republican hold			

== District 13 ==
The 13th district was represented by Republican Linda Reksten, who had represented the district since 2025. She lost the June primary to Finley Warden.

Montana House of Representatives 13th district general election, 2026
Party	Candidate	Votes	%
Republican	Finley Warden	2,780	54.64%
Democratic	Dalton Bradford	2,308	45.36%
Total votes		5,088	100%
Republican hold			

== District 14 ==
The 14th district is represented by Republican Paul Fielder, who has represented the district since 2025 and who represented the 13th District 2021 to 2025.

Montana House of Representatives 14th district general election, 2026
Party	Candidate	Votes	%
Republican	Paul Fielder (incumbent)	4,225	73.61%
Democratic	Colleen Hinds	1,515	26.39%
Total votes		5,740	100%
Republican hold			

== District 15 ==
The 15th district is represented by Democrat Thedis Crowe, who has represented the district since 2025.

Montana House of Representatives 15th district general election, 2026
Party	Candidate	Votes	%
Democratic	Thedis Crowe (incumbent)	1,910	59.32%
Republican	Ralph Foster	1,310	40.68%
Total votes		3,220	100%
Democratic hold			

== District 16 ==
The 16th district was represented by Democrat Tyson Running Wolf 2019-2027. He was term-limited and could not run for re-election to another term, and ran for Senate District 8 instead.

Montana House of Representatives 16th district general election, 2026
Party	Candidate	Votes	%
Democratic	Lona Running Wolf	2,546	100%
Total votes		2,546	100%
Democratic hold			

== District 17 ==
The 17th district was represented by Republican Zachary Wirth, who represented the district since 2025. He ran in the Republican primary for Senate District 9, but lost.

Montana House of Representatives 17th district general election, 2026
Party	Candidate	Votes	%
Republican	Justin Cleveland	3,751	70.03%
Democratic	Chris Bechtold	1,605	29.97%
Total votes		5,356	100%
Republican hold			

== District 18 ==
The 18th district was represented by Republican Llew Jones, who was term-limited and could not run for re-election to another term. He ran for Senate District 9 instead. Bruce Gillespie had previously represented Senate District 9 2019-2025.

Montana House of Representatives 18th district general election, 2026
Party	Candidate	Votes	%
Republican	Bruce Gillespie	3,708	100%
Total votes		3,708	100%
Republican hold			

== District 19 ==
The 19th district is represented by Democrat Jane Weber, who has represented the district since 2025.

Montana House of Representatives 19th district general election, 2026
Party	Candidate	Votes	%
Democratic	Jane Weber (incumbent)	1,657	64.18%
Republican	Hannah Trebas	925	35.82%
Total votes		2,582	100%
Democratic hold			

== District 20 ==
The 20th district was represented by Republican Melissa Nikolakakos, who had represented the district since 2025.

Montana House of Representatives 20th district general election, 2026
Party	Candidate	Votes	%
Democratic	Steve Keller	1,988	50.61%
Republican	Melissa Nikolakakos (incumbent)	1,940	49.39%
Total votes		3,928	100%
Democratic gain from Republican			

== District 21 ==
The 21st district was represented by Republican Edward Buttrey, who was term-limited and could not run for re-election to another term. Instead he ran in the Republican primary for Senate District 11, but lost.

Montana House of Representatives 21st district general election, 2026
Party	Candidate	Votes	%
Republican	Trevor Funseth	2,511	58.27%
Democratic	Lela Graham	1,798	41.73%
Total votes		4,309	100%
Republican hold			

== District 22 ==
The 22nd district was represented by Republican George Nikolakakos, who represented the district from 2025 to 2027. He ran for Senate District 12.

Montana House of Representatives 22nd district general election, 2026
Party	Candidate	Votes	%
Republican	Jason Lorang	1,325	53.62%
Democratic	Neal Miller	1,146	46.38%
Total votes		2,471	100%
Republican hold			

== District 23 ==
The 23rd district is represented by Republican Eric Tilleman, who has represented the district since 2024.

Montana House of Representatives 23rd district general election, 2026
Party	Candidate	Votes	%
Republican	Eric Tilleman (incumbent)	1,848	51.42%
Democratic	Rebecca Bogden-Richards	1,746	48.58%
Total votes		3,594	100%
Republican hold			

== District 24 ==
The 24th district is represented by Republican Steve Fitzpatrick, who has represented the district since 2025. He previously represented District 20 2011-2017 and Senate District 10 2017-2025.

Montana House of Representatives 24th district general election, 2026
Party	Candidate	Votes	%
Republican	Steve Fitzpatrick (incumbent)	2,355	58.29%
Democratic	Pam Carroll	1,685	41.71%
Total votes		4,040	100%
Republican hold			

== District 25 ==
The 25th district is represented by Republican Steve Gist, who has represented the district since 2021.

Montana House of Representatives 25th district general election, 2026
Party	Candidate	Votes	%
Republican	Steve Gist (incumbent)	3,017	70.72%
Democratic	Jerry Ferderer	1,249	29.28%
Total votes		4,266	100%
Republican hold			

== District 26 ==
The 26th district is represented by Republican Russ Miner, who has represented the district since 2025 and who previously represented District 19 from 2023 to 2025.

Montana House of Representatives 26th district general election, 2026
Party	Candidate	Votes	%
Republican	Russ Miner (incumbent)	3,579	69.47%
Democratic	Paul Jefferson	1,573	30.53%
Total votes		5,152	100%
Republican hold			

== District 27 ==
The 27th district is represented by Democrat Paul Tuss, who has represented the district since 2025 and who previously represented District 28 from 2023 to 2025.

Montana House of Representatives 27th district general election, 2026
Party	Candidate	Votes	%
Democratic	Paul Tuss (incumbent)	2,157	66.90%
Libertarian	Jordan Ophus	1,067	33.10%
Total votes		3,224	100%
Democratic hold			

== District 28 ==
The 28th district was represented by Republican Eric Albus, who had represented the district since 2025. He ran for Senate District 14.

Montana House of Representatives 28th district general election, 2026
Party	Candidate	Votes	%
Republican	Chisholm Christensen	3,649	100%
Total votes		3,649	100%
Republican hold			

== District 29 ==
The 29th district is represented by Republican Valerie Moore, who has represented the district since 2025.

Montana House of Representatives 29th district general election, 2026
Party	Candidate	Votes	%
Republican	Valerie Moore (incumbent)	3,661	79.29%
Democratic	Tess Fahlgren	956	20.71%
Total votes		4,617	100%
Republican hold			

== District 30 ==
The 30th district is represented by Republican Morgan Thiel, who has represented the district since 2025.

Montana House of Representatives 30th district general election, 2026
Party	Candidate	Votes	%
Republican	Morgan Thiel (incumbent)	2,769	81.95%
Democratic	Jason Boeshore	610	18.05%
Total votes		3,379	100%
Republican hold			

== District 31 ==
The 31st district was represented by Democrat Frank Smith, who had represented the district since 2021; he was eligible to run for re-election, but chose not to.

Montana House of Representatives 31st district general election, 2026
Party	Candidate	Votes	%
Democratic	Natalie O'Neal	1,724	100%
Total votes		1,724	100%
Democratic hold			

== District 32 ==
The 32nd district is represented by Democrat Mike Fox, who has represented the district since 2025 and who previously represented Senate District 16 from 2021 to 2025.

Montana House of Representatives 32nd district general election, 2026
Party	Candidate	Votes	%
Democratic	Mike Fox (incumbent)	1,941	100%
Total votes		1,941	100%
Democratic hold			

== District 33 ==
The 33rd district is represented by Republican Brandon Ler, who has represented the district since 2025 and who previously represented District 35 from 2021 to 2025.

Montana House of Representatives 33rd district general election, 2026
Party	Candidate	Votes	%
Republican	Brandon Ler (incumbent)	3,109	77.13%
Democratic	Tristan Veverka	922	22.87%
Total votes		4,031	100%
Republican hold			

== District 34 ==
The 34th district is represented by Republican Jerry Schillinger, who has represented the district since 2025 and who previously represented District 37 from 2021 to 2025.

Montana House of Representatives 34th district general election, 2026
Party	Candidate	Votes	%
Republican	Jerry Schillinger (incumbent)	4,391	86.88%
Democratic	Jasmine Erickson	663	13.12%
Total votes		5,054	100%
Republican hold			

== District 35 ==
The 35th district is represented by Republican Gary Parry, who has represented the district since 2025 and who previously represented District 39 from 2023 to 2025.

Montana House of Representatives 35th district general election, 2026
Party	Candidate	Votes	%
Republican	Gary Parry (incumbent)	3,823	80.60%
Democratic	Natalie Parker	920	19.40%
Total votes		4,743	100%
Republican hold			

== District 36 ==
The 36th district was represented by Republican Greg Kmetz, who had represented the district since 2025. He ran for Senate District 18.

Montana House of Representatives 36th district general election, 2026
Party	Candidate	Votes	%
Republican	Ty Linger	2,766	73.06%
Democratic	Benjamin Keyes	1,020	26.94%
Total votes		3,786	100%
Republican hold			

== District 37 ==
The 37th district is represented by Republican Shane Klakken, who has represented the district since 2025.

Montana House of Representatives 37th district general election, 2026
Party	Candidate	Votes	%
Republican	Shane Klakken (incumbent)	3,810	74.28%
Democratic	Tracey Miller Karcher	1,319	25.72%
Total votes		5,129	100%
Republican hold			

== District 38 ==
The 38th district is represented by Republican Greg Oblander, who has represented the district since 2025 and who previously represented District 40 from 2023 to 2025.

Montana House of Representatives 38th district general election, 2026
Party	Candidate	Votes	%
Republican	Greg Oblander (incumbent)	4,604	100%
Total votes		4,604	100%
Republican hold			

== District 39 ==
The 39th district is represented by Republican Kerri Seekins-Crowe, who has represented the district since 2025 and who previously represented District 43 from 2021 to 2025.

Montana House of Representatives 39th district general election, 2026
Party	Candidate	Votes	%
Republican	Kerri Seekins-Crowe (incumbent)	2,269	61.08%
Democratic	Melissa Smith	1,446	38.92%
Total votes		3,715	100%
Republican hold			

== District 40 ==
The 40th district is represented by Republican Mike Vinton, who has represented the district since 2025.

Montana House of Representatives 40th district general election, 2026
Party	Candidate	Votes	%
Republican	Mike Vinton (incumbent)	2,631	69.81%
Democratic	Gabriel Bradshaw	1,138	30.19%
Total votes		3,769	100%
Republican hold			

== District 41 ==
The 41st district is represented by Democrat Jade Sooktis, who has represented the district since 2025.

Montana House of Representatives 41st district general election, 2026
Party	Candidate	Votes	%
Democratic	Jade Sooktis (incumbent)	1,674	100%
Total votes		1,674	100%
Democratic hold			

== District 42 ==
The 42nd district is represented by Democrat Sidney Fitzpatrick, who has represented the district since 2025.

Montana House of Representatives 42nd district general election, 2026
Party	Candidate	Votes	%
Democratic	Sidney Fitzpatrick (incumbent)	1,622	54.72%
Republican	Jeremiah Jabs	1,342	45.28%
Total votes		2,964	100%
Democratic hold			

== District 43 ==
The 43rd district is represented by Republican Larry Brewster, who has represented the district since 2025 and who previously represented District 44 from 2020 to 2025.

Montana House of Representatives 43rd district general election, 2026
Party	Candidate	Votes	%
Republican	Larry Brewster (incumbent)	2,119	58.68%
Democratic	Rudolf Haden	1,492	41.32%
Total votes		3,611	100%
Republican hold			

== District 44 ==
The 44th district is represented by Republican Katie Zolnikov, who has represented the district since 2025 and who previously represented District 45 from 2020 to 2025.

Montana House of Representatives 44th district general election, 2026
Party	Candidate	Votes	%
Republican	Katie Zolnikov (incumbent)	2,782	62.59%
Democratic	Mike Eaton	1,663	37.41%
Total votes		4,445	100%
Republican hold			

== District 45 ==
The 45th district is represented by Democrat Denise Baum, who has represented the district since 2025 and who previously represented District 47 from 2023 to 2025.

Montana House of Representatives 45th district general election, 2026
Party	Candidate	Votes	%
Democratic	Denise Baum (incumbent)	2,406	58.99%
Republican	Bryce Walston	1,673	41.01%
Total votes		4,079	100%
Democratic hold			

== District 46 ==
The 46th district is represented by Democrat Denise Joy, who has represented the district since 2025 after previous incumbent Emma Kerr-Carpenter was nominated to succeed Kathy Kelker following Kelker's resignation from the Montana Senate.

Montana House of Representatives 46th district general election, 2026
Party	Candidate	Votes	%
Democratic	Denise Joy (incumbent)	2,163	57.45%
Republican	Kim Welzenbach	1,602	42.55%
Total votes		3,765	100%
Democratic hold			

== District 47 ==
The 47th district is represented by Democrat James Reavis, who has represented the district since 2025.

Montana House of Representatives 47th district general election, 2026
Party	Candidate	Votes	%
Democratic	James Reavis (incumbent)	1,605	60.77%
Republican	John Maxwell	1,036	39.23%
Total votes		2,641	100%
Democratic hold			

== District 48 ==
The 48th district is represented by Republican Curtis Schomer, who has represented the district since 2025.

Montana House of Representatives 48th district general election, 2026
Party	Candidate	Votes	%
Republican	Curtis Schomer (incumbent)	1,760	50.26%
Democratic	Tucker Colvin	1,742	49.74%
Total votes		3,502	100%
Republican hold			

== District 49 ==
The 49th district was represented by Republican Sherry Essmann from 2021 to 2027, but she ultimately decided to withdraw from the Republican primary after initially filing for re-election.

Montana House of Representatives 49th district general election, 2026
Party	Candidate	Votes	%
Republican	Charlie Loveridge	2,088	54.40%
Democratic	Rebecca Noell	1,750	45.60%
Total votes		3,838	100%
Republican hold			

== District 50 ==
The 50th district was represented by Republican Anthony Nicastro from 2025 to 2027; he was eligible to run for re-election but chose not to.

Montana House of Representatives 50th district general election, 2026
Party	Candidate	Votes	%
Republican	Stewart Harris	3,003	61.79%
Democratic	Mark Peters	1,857	38.21%
Total votes		4,860	100%
Republican hold			

== District 51 ==
The 51st district is represented by Republican Jodee Etchart, who has represented the district since 2025 and who previously represented District 48 from 2023 to 2025.

Montana House of Representatives 51st district general election, 2026
Party	Candidate	Votes	%
Republican	Jodee Etchart (incumbent)	2,544	57.53%
Democratic	Precious McKenzie	1,878	42.47%
Total votes		4,422	100%
Republican hold			

== District 52 ==
The 52nd district is represented by Republican Stacy Zinn, who has represented the district since 2025 after previous incumbent Bill Mercer was nominated and confirmed to the United States District Court for the District of Montana.

Montana House of Representatives 52nd district general election, 2026
Party	Candidate	Votes	%
Republican	Stacy Zinn (incumbent)	3,519	61.70%
Democratic	Elizabeth Heald	2,184	38.30%
Total votes		5,703	100%
Republican hold			

== District 53 ==
The 53rd district was represented by Republican Nelly Nicol, who had represented the district since 2023. She was defeated in the Republican primary by Troy Charbonneau.

Montana House of Representatives 53rd district general election, 2026
Party	Candidate	Votes	%
Republican	Troy Charbonneau	3,664	72.10%
Democratic	Matthew Hankins	1,418	27.90%
Total votes		5,082	100%
Republican hold			

== District 54 ==
The 54th district is represented by Republican Lee Deming, who has represented the district since 2025 and who previously represented District 55 from 2023 to 2025.

Montana House of Representatives 54th district general election, 2026
Party	Candidate	Votes	%
Republican	Lee Deming (incumbent)	2,610	68.43%
Democratic	Janine Coole	1,204	31.57%
Total votes		3,814	100%
Republican hold			

== District 55 ==
The 55th district is represented by Republican Brad Barker, who has represented the district since 2025 and who previously represented District 58 from 2023 to 2025.

Montana House of Representatives 55th district general election, 2026
Party	Candidate	Votes	%
Republican	Brad Barker (incumbent)	4,169	69.09%
Democratic	Richard Gessling	1,865	30.91%
Total votes		6,034	100%
Republican hold			

== District 56 ==
The 56th district is represented by Republican Fiona Nave, who has represented the district since 2025 and who previously represented District 57 from 2021 to 2025.

Montana House of Representatives 56th district general election, 2026
Party	Candidate	Votes	%
Republican	Fiona Nave (incumbent)	4,576	100%
Total votes		4,576	100%
Republican hold			

== District 57 ==
The 57th district was represented by Democrat Scott Rosenzweig, who had represented the district since 2025. He ran for Senate District 29. Becky Edwards previously represented District 61 from 2025 to 2027.

Montana House of Representatives 57th district general election, 2026
Party	Candidate	Votes	%
Democratic	Becky Edwards	3,654	55.41%
Republican	Bob Crank	2,941	44.59%
Total votes		6,595	100%
Democratic hold			

== District 58 ==
The 58th district is represented by Democrat Jamie Isaly, who has represented the district since 2025.

Montana House of Representatives 58th district general election, 2026
Party	Candidate	Votes	%
Democratic	Jamie Isaly (incumbent)	3,515	61.56%
Republican	Joshua Congleton	2,195	38.44%
Total votes		5,710	100%
Democratic hold			

== District 59 ==
The 59th district is represented by Democrat Katie Fire Thunder, who was appointed to the seat by the Gallatin County Commission in December 2025 to finish the term of Democrat Ed Stafman after Stafman resigned.

Montana House of Representatives 59th district general election, 2026
Party	Candidate	Votes	%
Democratic	Katie Fire Thunder (incumbent)	4,630	64.84%
Republican	Marc Greendorfer	2,511	35.16%
Total votes		7,141	100%
Democratic hold			

== District 60 ==
The 60th district is represented by Democrat Alanah Griffith, who has represented the district since 2025.

Montana House of Representatives 60th district general election, 2026
Party	Candidate	Votes	%
Democratic	Alanah Griffith (incumbent)	3,035	56.22%
Republican	Greg Leman	2,363	43.78%
Total votes		5,398	100%
Democratic hold			

== District 61 ==
The 61st district was represented by Democrat Becky Edwards, who represented the district since 2025. She ran in District 57.

Montana House of Representatives 61st district general election, 2026
Party	Candidate	Votes	%
Democratic	Rio Roland	2,421	85.82%
Republican	Eric Jacobs	400	14.18%
Total votes		2,821	100%
Democratic hold			

== District 62 ==
The 62nd district is represented by Democrat Josh Seckinger, who has represented the district since 2025.

Montana House of Representatives 62nd district general election, 2026
Party	Candidate	Votes	%
Democratic	Josh Seckinger (incumbent)	2,868	59.74%
Republican	Esther Fishbaugh	1,933	40.26%
Total votes		4,801	100%
Democratic hold			

== District 63 ==
The 63rd district is represented by Democrat Peter Strand, who has represented the district since 2025.

Montana House of Representatives 63rd district general election, 2026
Party	Candidate	Votes	%
Democratic	Peter Strand (incumbent)	3,330	65.02%
Republican	Lawrence Moore	1,791	34.97%
Total votes		5,121	100%
Democratic hold			

== District 64 ==
The 64th district was represented by Democrat Kelly Kortum, who had represented the district since 2025. He ran for Senate District 32.

Montana House of Representatives 64th district general election, 2026
Party	Candidate	Votes	%
Democratic	Brady Bremer	3,114	61.51%
Republican	Daniel Martinez	1,949	38.49%
Total votes		5,063	100%
Democratic hold			

== District 65 ==
The 65th district is represented by Democrat Brian Close, who has represented the district since 2025.

Montana House of Representatives 65th district general election, 2026
Party	Candidate	Votes	%
Democratic	Brian Close (incumbent)	3,333	62.79%
Republican	Joe Flynn	1,975	37.21%
Total votes		5,308	100%
Democratic hold			

== District 66 ==
The 66th district is represented by Democrat Eric Matthews, who has represented the district since 2023.

Montana House of Representatives 66th district general election, 2026
Party	Candidate	Votes	%
Democratic	Eric Matthews (incumbent)	4,090	63.31%
Republican	Owen Lang	2,370	36.69%
Total votes		6,460	100%
Democratic hold			

== District 67 ==
The 67th district is represented by Republican Jedediah Hinkle, who has represented the district since 2021.

Montana House of Representatives 67th district general election, 2026
Party	Candidate	Votes	%
Republican	Jedediah Hinkle (incumbent)	2,457	53.25%
Democratic	Logan Henke	2,157	46.75%
Total votes		4,614	100%
Republican hold			

== District 68 ==
The 68th district was represented by Republican Caleb Hinkle, who had represented the district since 2021. He ran for Senate District 34.

Montana House of Representatives 68th district general election, 2026
Party	Candidate	Votes	%
Republican	Randy Chamberlin	3,120	67.34%
Democratic	Jocelyn Kent	1,513	32.66%
Total votes		4,633	100%
Republican hold			

== District 69 ==
The 69th district was represented by Republican Kenneth Walsh, who had represented the district since 2025. He was defeated in the Republican primary by Trevor Walter.

Montana House of Representatives 69th district general election, 2026
Party	Candidate	Votes	%
Republican	Trevor Walter	4,532	100%
Total votes		4,532	100%
Republican hold			

== District 70 ==
The 70th district is represented by Republican Shannon Maness, who has represented the district since 2025.

Montana House of Representatives 70th district general election, 2026
Party	Candidate	Votes	%
Republican	Shannon Maness (incumbent)	3,592	68.83%
Democratic	Kobi Craddock	1,627	31.17%
Total votes		5,219	100%
Republican hold			

== District 71 ==
The 71st district is represented by Democrat Scott DeMarois, who has represented the district since 2025.

Montana House of Representatives 71st district general election, 2026
Party	Candidate	Votes	%
Democratic	Scott DeMarois (incumbent)	2,898	63.19%
Republican	Suzzann Nordwick	1,688	36.81%
Total votes		4,586	100%
Democratic hold			

== District 72 ==
The 72nd district is represented by Democrat Donavon Hawk, who has represented the district since 2025 and who previously represented District 76 from 2021 to 2025.

Montana House of Representatives 72nd district general election, 2026
Party	Candidate	Votes	%
Democratic	Donavon Hawk (incumbent)	2,932	69.58%
Republican	Michael Saul	1,282	30.42%
Total votes		4,214	100%
Democratic hold			

== District 73 ==
The 73rd district is represented by Democrat Jennifer Lynch, who has represented the district since 2023.

Montana House of Representatives 73rd district general election, 2026
Party	Candidate	Votes	%
Democratic	Jennifer Lynch (incumbent)	2,425	66.93%
Republican	Gerry Kennedy	1,198	33.07%
Total votes		3,623	100%
Democratic hold			

== District 74 ==
The 74th district is represented by Democrat Marc Lee, who has represented the district since 2025.

Montana House of Representatives 74th district general election, 2026
Party	Candidate	Votes	%
Democratic	Marc Lee (incumbent)	3,478	66.13%
Republican	Trenin Bayless	1,781	33.87%
Total votes		5,259	100%
Democratic hold			

== District 75 ==
The 75th district is represented by Republican Mark Reinschmidt, who has represented the district since 2025 following previous incumbent Marta Bertoglio's resignation to serve as the Director of the Montana Department of Commerce; her appointment was later ruled to have been illegal. Greg DeVries previously represented the district from 2019 to 2021 as a Republican.

Montana House of Representatives 75th district general election, 2026
Party	Candidate	Votes	%
Republican	Mark Reinschmidt (incumbent)	3,754	62.05%
Democratic	Patrick Sullivan	2,046	33.82%
Libertarian	Greg DeVries	250	4.13%
Total votes		6,050	100%
Republican hold			

== District 76 ==
The 76th district was represented by Republican John Fitzpatrick, who had represented the district since 2025. He lost the Republican primary to Trish Schreiber.

Montana House of Representatives 76th district general election, 2026
Party	Candidate	Votes	%
Republican	Trish Schreiber	3,632	66.67%
Nonpartisan	Shayne Morgan	1,816	33.33%
Total votes		5,448	100%
Republican hold			

== District 77 ==
The 77th district is represented by Republican Jane Gillette, who has represented the district since 2025 and who previously represented District 64 from 2021 to 2025.

Montana House of Representatives 77th district general election, 2026
Party	Candidate	Votes	%
Republican	Jane Gillette (incumbent)	4,582	100%
Total votes		4,582	100%
Republican hold			

== District 78 ==
The 78th district is represented by Republican Randyn Gregg, who has represented the district since 2025.

Montana House of Representatives 78th district general election, 2026
Party	Candidate	Votes	%
Republican	Randyn Gregg (incumbent)	3,957	77.42%
Democratic	Mark White	1,154	22.58%
Total votes		5,111	100%
Republican hold			

== District 79 ==
The 79th district is represented by Democrat Luke Muszkiewicz, who has represented the district since 2025.

Montana House of Representatives 79th district general election, 2026
Party	Candidate	Votes	%
Democratic	Luke Muszkiewicz (incumbent)	3,593	60.19%
Republican	Chiko Olson	2,376	39.81%
Total votes		5,969	100%
Democratic hold			

== District 80 ==
The 80th district was represented by Democrat Melissa Romano, who had represented the district since 2025. She withdrew from the Democratic primary to serve as president of the Montana Federation of Public Employees.

Montana House of Representatives 80th district general election, 2026
Party	Candidate	Votes	%
Democratic	Megan Lane	2,603	57.82%
Republican	Katie Fruits	1,899	42.18%
Total votes		4,502	100%
Democratic hold			

== District 81 ==
The 81st district was represented by Democrat Mary Caferro, who was term-limited and could not run for re-election to another term. Janet Ellis previously represented the district from 2015 to 2019 and Senate District 41 from 2019 to 2027.

Montana House of Representatives 81st district general election, 2026
Party	Candidate	Votes	%
Democratic	Janet Ellis	3,182	60.71%
Republican	John Looney, Sr.	2,059	39.29%
Total votes		5,241	100%
Democratic hold			

== District 82 ==
The 82nd district is represented by Democrat Pete Elverum, who has represented the district since 2025.

Montana House of Representatives 82nd district general election, 2026
Party	Candidate	Votes	%
Democratic	Pete Elverum (incumbent)	2,695	60.43%
Republican	Clinton McKay	1,765	39.57%
Total votes		4,460	100%
Democratic hold			

== District 83 ==
The 83rd district was represented by Democrat Jill Cohenour, who had represented the district since 2025. She was term-limited and could not run for re-election to another term.

Montana House of Representatives 83rd district general election, 2026
Party	Candidate	Votes	%
Democratic	Joe Cohenour	3,376	62.20%
Republican	Aaron Leas	2,052	37.80%
Total votes		5,428	100%
Democratic hold			

== District 84 ==
The 84th district is represented by Republican Julie Darling, who had represented the district since 2025. She was term-limited and could not run for re-election to another term.

Montana House of Representatives 84th district general election, 2026
Party	Candidate	Votes	%
Republican	Roy Caldwell	3,815	63.19%
Democratic	Tia Nelson	2,222	36.81%
Total votes		6,037	100%
Republican hold			

== District 85 ==
The 85th district was represented by Republican Kathy Love, who had represented the district since 2025. She ran in the Republican primary for Senate District 43, but lost.

Montana House of Representatives 85th district general election, 2026
Party	Candidate	Votes	%
Republican	Kim Dailey	4,411	72.36%
Democratic	Laura Jackson	1,685	27.64%
Total votes		6,096	100%
Republican hold			

== District 86 ==
The 86th district was represented by Republican David Bedey, who had represented the district since 2019. He was term-limited and ran for Senate District 43. Wayne Rusk previously represented District 88 from 2023 to 2025.

Montana House of Representatives 86th district general election, 2026
Party	Candidate	Votes	%
Republican	Wayne Rusk	3,314	59.99%
Democratic	Archie Thomas	2,210	40.01%
Total votes		5,524	100%
Republican hold			

== District 87 ==
The 87th district is represented by Republican Terry Nelson, who has represented the district since 2025 following previous incumbent Ron Marshall's March resignation.

Montana House of Representatives 87th district general election, 2026
Party	Candidate	Votes	%
Republican	Terry Nelson (incumbent)	4,251	70.98%
Democratic	Bill Jones	1,738	29.02%
Total votes		5,989	100%
Republican hold			

== District 88 ==
The 88th district is represented by Republican Greg Overstreet, who has represented the district since 2025.

Montana House of Representatives 88th district general election, 2026
Party	Candidate	Votes	%
Republican	Greg Overstreet (incumbent)	4,028	65.21%
Democratic	Evan Schroedel	2,149	34.79%
Total votes		6,177	100%
Republican hold			

== District 89 ==
The 89th district is represented by Democrat Mark Thane, who has represented the district since 2025 and who previously represented District 99 from 2021 to 2025. Lyn Hellegaard previously represented District 97 from 2023 to 2025.

Montana House of Representatives 89th district general election, 2026
Party	Candidate	Votes	%
Democratic	Mark Thane (incumbent)	3,412	62.17%
Republican	Lyn Hellegaard	2,076	37.83%
Total votes		5,488	100%
Democratic hold			

== District 90 ==
The 90th district was represented by Republican Curtis Cochran, who had represented the district since 2025. He was defeated in the Republican primary by Jeff Stanek.

Montana House of Representatives 90th district general election, 2026
Party	Candidate	Votes	%
Republican	Jeff Stanek	4,301	100%
Total votes		4,301	100%
Republican hold			

== District 91 ==
The 91st district is represented by Democrat Shelly Fyant, who has represented the district since 2025.

Montana House of Representatives 91st district general election, 2026
Party	Candidate	Votes	%
Democratic	Shelly Fyant (incumbent)	2,992	59.17%
Republican	Charles Headley	2,065	40.83%
Total votes		5,057	100%
Democratic hold			

== District 92 ==
The 92nd district was represented by Democrat Connie Keogh, who had represented the district since 2025. She was term-limited and could not run for re-election to another term.

Montana House of Representatives 92nd district general election, 2026
Party	Candidate	Votes	%
Democratic	Monica Tranel	4,107	100%
Total votes		4,107	100%
Democratic hold			

== District 93 ==
The 93rd district was represented by Democrat Katie Sullivan, who had represented the district since 2025. She was term-limited and could not run for re-election to another term.

Montana House of Representatives 93rd district general election, 2026
Party	Candidate	Votes	%
Democratic	Ben Davis	3,918	68.09%
Republican	Roy Handley	1,836	31.91%
Total votes		5,754	100%
Democratic hold			

== District 94 ==
The 94th district was represented by Democrat Marilyn Marler, who had represented the district since 2025. She was term-limited and could not run for re-election to another term.

Montana House of Representatives 94th district general election, 2026
Party	Candidate	Votes	%
Democratic	Robin Kendall	4,104	65.45%
Republican	Greg Woodward	2,166	34.55%
Total votes		6,270	100%
Democratic hold			

== District 95 ==
The 95th district is represented by Democrat Zooey Zephyr, who has represented the district since 2025 and who previously represented District 100 from 2023 to 2025.

Montana House of Representatives 95th district general election, 2026
Party	Candidate	Votes	%
Democratic	Zooey Zephyr (incumbent)	4,951	100%
Total votes		4,951	100%
Democratic hold			

== District 96 ==
The 96th district is represented by Democrat Bob Carter, who has represented the district since 2025 and who previously represented District 98 from 2023 to 2025.

Montana House of Representatives 96th district general election, 2026
Party	Candidate	Votes	%
Democratic	Bob Carter (incumbent)	3,723	100%
Total votes		3,723	100%
Democratic hold			

== District 97 ==
The 97th district is represented by Democrat Melody Cunningham, who has represented the district since 2025.

Montana House of Representatives 97th district general election, 2026
Party	Candidate	Votes	%
Democratic	Melody Cunningham (incumbent)	3,440	66.87%
Republican	Michael Hagestad	1,704	33.13%
Total votes		5,144	100%
Democratic hold			

== District 98 ==
The 98th district is represented by Democrat Jonathan Karlen, who has represented the district since 2025 and who previously represented District 96 from 2023 to 2025.

Montana House of Representatives 98th district general election, 2026
Party	Candidate	Votes	%
Democratic	Jonathan Karlen (incumbent)	3,518	67.45%
Republican	Bryan Muzzana	1,698	32.55%
Total votes		5,216	100%
Democratic hold			

== District 99 ==
The 99th district is represented by Democrat Tom France, who has represented the district since 2025 and who previously represented District 94 from 2021 to 2025.

Montana House of Representatives 99th district general election, 2026
Party	Candidate	Votes	%
Democratic	Tom France (incumbent)	3,632	64.00%
Republican	Ryan Darling	2,043	36.00%
Total votes		5,675	100%
Democratic hold			

== District 100 ==
The 100th district is represented by Democrat SJ Howell, who has represented the district since 2025 and who previously represented District 95 from 2023 to 2025.

Montana House of Representatives 100th district general election, 2026
Party	Candidate	Votes	%
Democratic	SJ Howell (incumbent)	4,095	83.67%
Republican	Michael Bowles	651	13.30%
Libertarian	JC Windmueller	148	3.02%
Total votes		4,894	100%
Democratic hold			
