= 69th Montana Legislature =

←	68th Legislature

Overview
- Legislative body: Montana Legislature
- Jurisdiction: Montana, United States
- Meeting place: Montana State Capitol
- Term: 2025
- Website: legmt.gov

Montana State Senate
- Members: 50 Senators
- Senate President: Matt Regier (R)
- Majority Leader: Tom McGillvray (R)
- Minority Leader: Pat Flowers (D)
- Party control: Republican Party of Montana

Montana House of Representatives
- Members: 100 Representatives
- Speaker of the House: Brandon Ler (R)
- Majority Leader: Steve Fitzpatrick (R)
- Minority Leader: Katie Sullivan (D)
- Party control: Republican Party of Montana

The 69th Montana Legislature was the legislative session of the Montana Legislature that convened on January 6, 2025, and adjourned sine die April 30, 2025. While there was a Republican majority in both chambers, the session was notable for a Senate coalition of 18 Democrats and 9 moderate Republicans, dubbed "the nine", which created a 27–23 working majority in the Senate that blocked a number of Republican efforts.

The Montana Republican party censured the nine Republican senators, Jason Ellsworth, Butch Gillespie, Gregg Hunter, Joshua Kassmier, Gayle Lammers, Denley Loge, Wendy McKamey, Russel Tempel, and Shelley Vance. In response, eight of the nine (excepting Ellsworth) wrote an open letter to the citizens of Montana, stating "We were elected to serve you, not to follow orders from political insiders".

== Events ==
On March 3, Representative Ron Marshall resigned, citing critiques over the influence of lobbyists on the Legislature. Former county commissioner Terry Nelson was appointed March 10 to replace him.

On June 16, Representative Marta Bertoglio resigned after being appointed to lead the state's commerce department. Contractor Mark Reinschmidt was appointed July 22 to replace her.

== Senate ==
=== Leaders ===
Position	Name	Party
President of the Senate	Matt Regier	Republican
President pro tempore	Kenneth Bogner	Republican
Majority Leader	Tom McGillvray	Republican
Majority Whips	Dennis Lenz	Republican
Majority Whips	Barry Usher	Republican
Majority Whips	Sue Vinton	Republican
Majority Whips	Daniel Zolnikov	Republican
Minority Leader	Pat Flowers	Democratic
Minority Whips	Shane Morigeau	Democratic
Minority Whips	Laura Smith	Democratic
Minority Whips	Susan Webber	Democratic

=== Senate Members ===
District	Senator	Party	Residence	First elected
1	Mike Cuffe	Rep	Eureka	2018
2	Dave Fern	Dem	Whitefish	2024
3	Carl Glimm	Rep	Kila	2020
4	John Fuller	Rep	Kalispell	2022
5	Matt Regier	Rep	Kalispell	2024
6	Mark Noland	Rep	Bigfork	2022
7	Greg Hertz	Rep	Polson	2020
8	Susan Webber	Dem	Browning	2018
9	Bruce Gillespie	Rep	Ethridge	2018
10	Jeremy Trebas	Rep	Great Falls	2022
11	Daniel Emrich	Rep	Great Falls	2022
12	Wendy McKamey	Rep	Great Falls	2022
13	Joshua Kassmier	Rep	Fort Benton	2024
14	Russel Tempel	Rep	Chester	2018
15	Gregg Hunter	Rep	Glasgow	2024
16	Jonathan Windy Boy	Dem	Box Elder	2024
17	Bob Phalen	Rep	Lindsay	2024
18	Kenneth Bogner	Rep	Miles City	2018
19	Barry Usher	Rep	Billings	2022
20	Sue Vinton	Rep	Billings	2024
21	Gayle Lammers	Rep	Hardin	2024
22	Daniel Zolnikov	Rep	Billings	2022
23	Emma Kerr-Carpenter	Dem	Billings	2024*
24	Mike Yakawich	Rep	Billings	2024
25	Dennis Lenz	Rep	Billings	2022
26	Tom McGillvray	Rep	Billings	2020
27	Vince Ricci	Rep	Billings	2024
28	Forrest Mandeville	Rep	Columbus	2022
29	John Esp	Rep	Big Timber	2018
30	Cora Neumann	Dem	Helena	2024
31	Pat Flowers	Dem	Belgrade	2018
32	Denise Hayman	Dem	Bozeman	2022
33	Christopher Pope	Dem	Bozeman	2020
34	Shelley Vance	Rep	Belgrade	2022
35	Tony Tezak	Rep	Ennis	2024
36	Sara Novak	Dem	Anaconda	2024
37	Derek Harvey	Dem	Butte	2024
38	Becky Beard	Rep	Elliston	2024
39	Wylie Galt	Rep	Martinsdale	2024
40	Laura Smith	Dem	Helena	2024
41	Janet Ellis	Dem	Helena	2018
42	Mary Ann Dunwell	Dem	Helena	2022
43	Jason Ellsworth	Rep	Hamilton	2018
44	Theresa Manzella	Rep	Hamilton	2020
45	Denley Loge	Rep	St. Regis	2024
46	Jacinda Morigeau	Dem	Arlee	2024
47	Ellie Boldman	Dem	Missoula	2020
48	Andrea Olsen	Dem	Missoula	2022
49	Willis Curdy	Dem	Missoula	2022
50	Shane Morigeau	Dem	Missoula	2022

*Senator was originally appointed before the start of the 69th session

== House ==
=== Leaders ===
Office	Representative	Party
Speaker of the House	Brandon Ler	Republican
Speaker pro tempore	Katie Zolnikov	Republican
Majority Leader	Steve Fitzpatrick	Republican
Majority Whips	Marta Bertoglio	Republican
Majority Whips	Jed Hinkle	Republican
Majority Whips	Braxton Mitchell	Republican
Majority Whips	Amy Regier	Republican
Minority Leader	Katie Sullivan	Democratic
Minority Whips	SJ Howell	Democratic
Minority Whips	Jonathan Karlen	Democratic
Minority Whips	Melissa Romano	Democratic
Minority Whips	Tyson Running Wolf	Democratic

=== House Members ===
District	Representative	Party	Residence	First elected
1	Neil Duram	Republican	Libby	2018
2	Tom Millett	Republican	Marion	2024
3	Debo Powers	Democratic	Whitefish	2024
4	Lyn Bennett	Republican	Columbia Falls	2024
5	Braxton Mitchell	Republican	Columbia Falls	2020
6	Amy Regier	Republican	Kalispell	2020
7	Courtenay Sprunger	Republican	Kalispell	2022
8	Lukas Schubert	Republican	Kalispell	2024
9	Steven Kelly	Republican	Kalispell	2024
10	Terry Falk	Republican	Kalispell	2022
11	Ed Byrne	Republican	Bigfork	2024
12	Tracy Sharp	Republican	Polson	2024
13	Linda Reksten	Republican	Polson	2020
14	Paul Fielder	Republican	Thompson Falls	2020
15	Thedis Crowe	Democratic	Browning	2024
16	Tyson Running Wolf	Democratic	Browning	2018
17	Zachary Wirth	Republican	Wolf Creek	2024
18	Llew Jones	Republican	Conrad	2018
19	Jane Weber	Democratic	Great Falls	2024
20	Melissa Nikolakakos	Republican	Great Falls	2024
21	Edward Buttrey	Republican	Great Falls	2018
22	George Nikolakakos	Republican	Great Falls	2022
23	Eric Tilleman	Republican	Cascade	2024
24	Steve Fitzpatrick	Republican	Great Falls	2024
25	Steve Gist	Republican	Cascade	2020
26	Russ Miner	Republican	Great Falls	2022
27	Paul Tuss	Democratic	Havre	2022
28	Eric Albus	Republican	Glasgow	2024
29	Valerie Moore	Republican	Plentywood	2024
30	Morgan Thiel	Republican	Sidney	2024
31	Frank Smith	Democratic	Poplar	2020
32	Mike Fox	Democratic	Hays	2024
33	Brandon Ler	Republican	Savage	2020
34	Jerry Schillinger	Republican	Circle	2020
35	Gary Parry	Republican	Colstrip	2022
36	Greg Kmetz	Republican	Miles City	2022
37	Shane Klakken	Republican	Grass Range	2024
38	Greg Oblander	Republican	Billings	2022
39	Kerri Seekins-Crowe	Republican	Billings	2020
40	Mike Vinton	Republican	Billings	2024
41	Jade Sooktis	Democratic	Lame Deer	2024
42	Sidney “Chip” Fitzpatrick	Democratic	Crow Agency	2024
43	Larry Brewster	Republican	Billings	2020
44	Katie Zolnikov	Republican	Billings	2020
45	Denise Baum	Democratic	Billings	2022
46	Denise Joy	Democratic	Billings	2024*
47	James Reavis	Democratic	Billings	2024
48	Curtis Schomer	Republican	Billings	2024
49	Sherry Essmann	Republican	Billings	2022
50	Anthony Nicastro	Republican	Billings	2024
51	Jodee Etchart	Republican	Billings	2022
52	Bill Mercer	Republican	Billings	2018
52	Stacy Zinn	Republican	Billings	2025*
53	Nelly Nicol	Republican	Billings	2022
54	Lee Deming	Republican	Laurel	2022
55	Brad Barker	Republican	Red Lodge	2022
56	Fiona Nave	Republican	Columbus	2020
57	Scott Rosenzweig	Democratic	Bozeman	2024
58	Jamie Isaly	Democratic	Bozeman	2024
59	Ed Stafman	Democratic	Bozeman	2020
59	Katie Fire Thunder	Democratic	Bozeman	2025*
60	Alanah Griffith	Democratic	Big Sky	2024
61	Becky Edwards	Democratic	Bozeman	2024
62	Joshua Seckinger	Democratic	Bozeman	2024
63	Peter Strand	Democratic	Bozeman	2024
64	Kelly Kortum	Democratic	Bozeman	2020
65	Brian Close	Democratic	Bozeman	2024
66	Eric Matthews	Democratic	Bozeman	2022
67	Jedediah Hinkle	Republican	Belgrade	2020
68	Caleb Hinkle	Republican	Belgrade	2020
69	Kenneth Walsh	Republican	Twin Bridges	2020
70	Shannon Maness	Republican	Dillon	2024
71	Scott DeMarois	Democratic	Anaconda	2024
72	Donavon Hawk	Democratic	Butte	2020
73	Jennifer Lynch	Democratic	Butte	2022
74	Marc Lee	Democratic	Butte	2024
75	Marta Bertoglio	Republican	Clancy	2020
75	Mark Reinschmidt	Republican	Whitehall	2025*
76	John Fitzpatrick	Republican	Anaconda	2022
77	Jane Gillette	Republican	Three Forks	2020
78	Randyn Gregg	Republican	White Sulphur Springs	2024
79	Luke Muszkiewicz	Democratic	Helena	2024
80	Melissa Romano	Democratic	Helena	2022
81	Mary Caferro	Democratic	Helena	2022
82	Pete Elverum	Democratic	Helena	2024
83	Jill Cohenour	Democratic	Helena	2022
84	Julie Dooling	Republican	Helena	2024
85	Kathy Love	Republican	Hamilton	2024
86	David Bedey	Republican	Hamilton	2018
87	Ron Marshall	Republican	Stevensville	2021
87	Terry Nelson	Republican	Stevensville	2025*
88	Greg Overstreet	Republican	Stevensville	2024
89	Mark Thane	Democratic	Missoula	2020
90	Curtis Cochran	Republican	St. Regis	2024
91	Shelly Fyant	Democratic	Arlee	2024
92	Connie Keogh	Democratic	Missoula	2018
93	Katie Sullivan	Democratic	Missoula	2018
94	Marilyn Marler	Democratic	Missoula	2018
95	Zooey Zephyr	Democratic	Missoula	2022
96	Bob Carter	Democratic	Missoula	2022
97	Melody Cunningham	Democratic	Missoula	2024
98	Jonathan Karlen	Democratic	Missoula	2022
99	Tom France	Democratic	Missoula	2020
100	SJ Howell	Democratic	Missoula	2022

*Representative was appointed

== See also ==
- List of Montana state Legislatures
