= Montana Democratic Party =

Montana affiliate of the Democratic Party

- Chairperson: Bruce Knutson
- Senate Minority Leader: Pat Flowers
- House Minority Leader: Katie Sullivan
- Headquarters: Helena, Montana
- National affiliation: Democratic Party
- Seats in the U.S. Senate: 0 / 2
- Seats in the U.S. House: 0 / 2
- Seats in the Montana Senate: 19 / 50
- Seats in the Montana House: 42 / 100
- Statewide Executive Offices: 0 / 6

Election symbol

Website
- www.montanademocrats.org

Montana Democratic Party (MDP) is the affiliate of the Democratic Party in the U.S. state of Montana and one of the two major political parties in the state. The current chair is Bruce Knutson The National Committeeman is Donavon Hawk, and the National Committeewoman is Mary Sheehy Moe.

== History ==
=== Recent years ===
In August 2025, the Montana Democratic Party came under renewed scrutiny following reports that a party financial controller with close links to party leadership, Abbey Lee Cook, had been embezzling donations from Democratic candidates and affiliated organizations. Cook, entered pleas of guilty to three federal charges of wire fraud.

In November 2024, all Montana Democrats running in statewide or federal races lost to GOP candidates, continuing a trend of declining fortune for the Democratic Party in Montana. Before 2024, Montana's federal delegation continuously included at least one Democrat from 1911 until Sen. Jon Tester's 2024 loss to Republican Tim Sheehy, and as recently as 2013, Democrats held all statewide elected offices. In state legislative races, Democrats overturned the GOP supermajority following beneficial redistricting that reduced the total number of competitive districts favoring safer Democratic and Republican districts.

In November 2022, Montana Republicans secured a supermajority in both legislative houses.

In June 2022, NPR reported that Montana had two U.S. House districts for the first time since 1992, and while the Montana Democratic Party had three candidates in that month's primary, it hadn't had representation in the U.S. House since 1994. In August 2022, Montana Democrats meeting in Butte announced a new platform, largely statements of principal, such as supporting abortion rights and declaring a "state of climate emergency." New policy objectives included restoring the Judicial Nominating Commission, recently eliminated by Republicans, and establishing a panel to examine atrocities at the state's former boarding schools for Native Americans. Sheila Hogan remained the state party's executive director; the only Democrat in statewide or federal office at the time was Senator Jon Tester.

In February 2022, Democratic senator Jon Tester criticized the larger state party for not doing more to appeal to and engage with "Middle America," clarifying he meant the area between the Appalachians the Rocky Mountains.

In January 2020, Sandi Luckey, previously the state party treasurer for the Democratic party, was elected executive director of the Montana Democratic Party. Robyn Driscoll was party chair at that time. The state party announced in May 2020 that it was creating a Steering Committee for the Blue Bench Program, and that it would have three of those positions dedicated permanently for Native American leaders. The Blue Bench Program recruited and developed local candidates to run for office. At that time, the state party's voting delegates largely consisted of legislative leadership, Democrats in statewide elected office, and leaders in Democratic Central Committees for state countries. The party had no delegate votes assigned specifically for Native Americans, and three voting delegates at state conventions who were Native Americans. The Associated Press reported in June 2020 that the state party voted to establish tribal committees to represent the Crow, Northern Cheyenne, Fort Peck, Fort Belknap, Rocky Boy's, Blackfeet and Flathead reservations and the Little Shell-Chippewa tribes, and the committees would operate "like county central committees, whose delegates vote on the party's platform, rules and officers and nominate candidates for special elections." Luckey, still the state party executive director, said the move made the Montana Democratic Party the first US state country to formally create a formal role based on population for Native Americans.

During a special election for a Congressional seat in 2017, state party officials "grew frustrated" according to The New York Times when national Democratic Party leaders were implored by Democratic Senator Jon Tester to spend national party money on their candidate Rob Quist, but declined. Quist ultimately lost the seat to Republican Greg Gianforte.

== Elected officers ==
Office	Officeholder in 2022
Chair	Shannon O'Brien
Vice Chair	Max Johansen
Secretary	Melody Cunningham
Treasurer	Lance Four Star
National Committeeman	Laurie Bishop
National Committeewoman	Donavon Hawk

== Current elected officials ==
The Montana Democratic Party currently hold none of the six statewide offices and a minority of the seats in both the Montana Senate and Montana House of Representatives.

=== U.S. House of Representatives ===
District	Member	Photo
1st	Sam Forstag (elect)	

=== Statewide offices ===
- None

=== Legislative leaders ===
Office	Representative
Senate Minority Leader	Pat Flowers
Senate Minority Whips	Shane Morigeau
Senate Minority Whips	Laura Smith
Senate Minority Whips	Susan Webber
House Minority Leader	Katie Sullivan
House Minority Whips	Tyson Runningwolf
House Minority Whips	SJ Howell
House Minority Whips	Melissa Romano

=== 18 Members of the Montana Senate ===
District	Senator	Residence
2	Carl Glimm	Kila
8	Susan Webber	Browning
16	Mike Fox	Hays
25	Jen Gross	Billings
31	Christopher Pope	Bozeman
32	Pat Flowers	Belgrade
33	Jennifer Pomnichowski	Bozeman
37	Ryan Lynch	Butte
38	Edith McClafferty	Butte
39	Mark Sweeney	Helena
41	Janet Ellis	Helena
42	Jill Cohenour	East Helena
45	Ellie Boldman	Missoula
46	Shannon O'Brien	Helena
48	Nate McConnell	Missoula
49	Diane Sands	Missoula
50	Bryce Bennett	Missoula

=== 42 Members of the Montana House of Representatives ===
District	Representative	Residence
3	Debo Powers	Polebridge
5	Dave Fern	Whitefish
15	Marvin Weatherwax Jr.	Browning
16	Tyson Runningwolf	Browning
19	Jane Weber	Great Falls
27	Paul Tuss	Havre
31	Frank Smith	Poplar
32	Mike Fox	Hays
41	Jade Sooktis	Lame Deer
42	Sharon Stewart-Peregoy	Crow Agency
45	Denise Baum	Billings
46	Emma Kerr-Carpenter	Billings
47	James Reavis	Billings
57	Scott Rosenzweig	Bozeman
58	Jamie Isaly	Livingston
59	Ed Stafman	Bozeman
60	Alanah Griffith	Livingston
61	Jim Hamilton	Bozeman
62	Ed Stafman	Bozeman
63	Alice Buckley	Bozeman
64	Kelly Kortum	Bozeman
65	Brian Close	Bozeman
66	Denise Hayman	Bozeman
71	Scott DeMarois	Anaconda
72	Donavon Hawk	Butte
73	Jennifer Lynch	Butte
74	Donavon Hawk	Butte
79	Luke Muszkiewicz	Helena
80	Melissa Romano	Helena
81	Mary Caferro	Helena
82	Pete Elverum	Helena
83	Jill Cohenour	Helena
89	Katie Sullivan	Missoula
90	Marilyn Marler	Missoula
91	Connie Keogh	Missoula
92	Katie Sullivan	Missoula
93	Joe Read	Ronan
94	Tom France	Missoula
95	Zooey Zephyr	Missoula
96	Willis Curdy	Missoula
97	Melody Cunningham	Missoula
98	Jonathan Karlen	Missoula
99	Tom France	Missoula
100	SJ Howell	Missoula

=== Mayors ===
- Missoula: Andrea Davis
- Helena: Wilmot Collins

== Election results ==
=== Federal ===
==== Presidential ====
Montana Democratic Party presidential election results
Election	Presidential ticket	Votes	Vote %	Electoral votes	Result
1892	Grover Cleveland/Adlai E. Stevenson	17,690	39.79%	0 / 3	Won
1896	William Jennings Bryan/Arthur Sewall	42,628	79.93%	3 / 3	Lost
1900	William Jennings Bryan/Adlai E. Stevenson	37,311	58.43%	3 / 3	Lost
1904	Alton B. Parker/Henry G. Davis	21,773	33.79%	0 / 3	Lost
1908	William Jennings Bryan/John W. Kern	29,326	42.61%	0 / 3	Lost
1912	Woodrow Wilson/Thomas R. Marshall	27,941	35.00%	4 / 4	Won
1916	Woodrow Wilson/Thomas R. Marshall	101,063	56.88%	4 / 4	Won
1920	James M. Cox/Franklin D. Roosevelt	57,372	32.05%	0 / 4	Lost
1924	John W. Davis/Charles W. Bryan	33,805	19.38%	0 / 4	Lost
1928	Al Smith/Joseph T. Robinson	78,578	40.48%	0 / 4	Lost
1932	Franklin D. Roosevelt/John N. Garner	127,286	58.80%	4 / 4	Won
1936	Franklin D. Roosevelt/John N. Garner	159,690	69.28%	4 / 4	Won
1940	Franklin D. Roosevelt/Henry A. Wallace	145,698	58.78%	4 / 4	Won
1944	Franklin D. Roosevelt/Harry S. Truman	112,556	54.28%	4 / 4	Won
1948	Harry S. Truman/Alben W. Barkley	119,071	53.09%	4 / 4	Won
1952	Adlai Stevenson/John Sparkman	106,213	40.07%	0 / 4	Lost
1956	Adlai Stevenson/Estes Kefauver	116,238	42.87%	0 / 4	Lost
1960	John F. Kennedy/Lyndon B. Johnson	134,891	48.60%	0 / 4	Won
1964	Lyndon B. Johnson/Hubert Humphrey	164,246	58.95%	4 / 4	Won
1968	Hubert Humphrey/Edmund Muskie	114,117	41.59%	0 / 4	Lost
1972	George McGovern/Sargent Shriver	120,197	37.85%	0 / 4	Lost
1976	Jimmy Carter/Walter Mondale	149,259	45.40%	0 / 4	Won
1980	Jimmy Carter/Walter Mondale	118,032	32.43%	0 / 4	Lost
1984	Walter Mondale/Geraldine Ferraro	146,742	38.18%	0 / 4	Lost
1988	Michael Dukakis/Lloyd Bentsen	168,936	46.20%	0 / 4	Lost
1992	Bill Clinton/Al Gore	154,507	37.63%	3 / 3	Won
1996	Bill Clinton/Al Gore	167,922	41.23%	0 / 3	Won
2000	Al Gore/Joe Lieberman	137,126	33.4%	0 / 3	Lost
2004	John Kerry/John Edwards	173,710	38.56%	0 / 3	Lost
2008	Barack Obama/Joe Biden	232,159	47.11%	0 / 3	Won
2012	Barack Obama/Joe Biden	201,839	41.70%	0 / 3	Won
2016	Hillary Clinton/Tim Kaine	177,709	35.75%	0 / 3	Lost
2020	Joe Biden/Kamala Harris	244,786	40.55%	0 / 3	Won
2024	Kamala Harris/Tim Walz	231,906	38.46%	0 / 4	Lost

==== U.S. Senate ====
Class 1
Year	Candidate	Votes	%	Result
1970	Mike Mansfield	150,060	60.54%	Won ✓
1976	John Melcher	206,232	64.16%	Won ✓
1982	John Melcher	174,861	54.46%	Won ✓
1988	John Melcher	175,809	48.13%	Lost ✗
1994	Jack Mudd	131,845	37.63%	Lost ✗
2000	Brian Schweitzer	194,430	41.27%	Lost ✗
2006	Jon Tester	199,845	49.16%	Won ✓
2012	Jon Tester	236,123	48.58%	Won ✓
2018	Jon Tester	253,876	50.33%	Won ✓
2024	Jon Tester	276,305	45.50%	Lost ✗

Class 2
Year	Candidate	Votes	%	Result
1972	Lee Metcalf	163,609	51.95%	Won ✓
1978	Max Baucus	160,353	55.69%	Won ✓
1984	Max Baucus	215,704	56.89%	Won ✓
1990	Max Baucus	217,563	68.13%	Won ✓
1996	Max Baucus	201,935	49.56%	Won ✓
2002	Max Baucus	204,853	62.74%	Won ✓
2008	Max Baucus	348,289	72.92%	Won ✓
2014	Amanda Curtis	148,184	40.07%	Lost ✗
2020	Steve Bullock	272,463	44.99%	Lost ✗
2026	Endorsed Seth Bodnar (Independent)			Lost ✗
2026	Alani Bankhead	59,950	12.26	Lost ✗

==== U.S. House ====
Election	Votes	%	Seats (MT)	±	%
2016	205,919	40.55	0 / 1	0	N/A
2017 (sp.)	169,214	44.37	0 / 1	0	N/A
2018	233,284	46.25	0 / 1	0	N/A
2020	262,340	43.61	0 / 1	0	N/A
2022	158,745	34.24	0 / 2	0	9.37
2024	237,496	39.65	0 / 2	0	5.41
2026	206,275	42.25	1 / 2	▲1	2.60

=== State ===
Governor
Election	Candidate/ticket	Votes	%	Result
1889	Joseph Toole	19,735	50.96%	Won ✓
1892	Timothy E. Collins	17,650	39.96%	Lost ✗
1896	Robert Burns Smith	36,688	70.99%	Won ✓
1900	Joseph Toole	31,419	49.24%	Won ✓
1904	Joseph Toole	35,377	53.79%	Won ✓
1908	Edwin L. Norris	32,282	47.34%	Won ✓
1912	Sam V. Stewart	25,381	31.81%	Won ✓
1916	Sam V. Stewart	85,683	49.36%	Won ✓
1920	Burton K. Wheeler	74,875	40.26%	Lost ✗
1924	John E. Erickson	88,801	51.02%	Won ✓
1928	John E. Erickson	113,635	58.52%	Won ✓
1932	John E. Erickson	104,949	48.50%	Won ✓
1936	Roy E. Ayers	115,310	50.94%	Won ✓
1940	Roy E. Ayers	119,453	48.64%	Lost ✗
1944	Leif Erickson	89,224	43.18%	Lost ✗
1948	John W. Bonner	124,267	55.73%	Won ✓
1952	John W. Bonner	129,369	49.04%	Lost ✗
1956	Arnold Olsen	131,488	48.63%	Lost ✗
1960	Paul Cannon	125,651	44.89%	Lost ✗
1964	Roland Renne	136,862	48.71%	Lost ✗
1968	Forrest H. Anderson	150,481	54.11%	Won ✓
1972	Thomas Lee Judge	172,523	54.12%	Won ✓
1976	Thomas Lee Judge/Ted Schwinden	195,420	61.70%	Won ✓
1980	Ted Schwinden/George Turman	199,574	55.37%	Won ✓
1984	Ted Schwinden/George Turman	266,578	70.34%	Won ✓
1988	Thomas Lee Judge/Barbara B. Skelton	169,313	46.13%	Lost ✗
1992	Dorothy Bradley/Mike Halligan	198,421	48.65%	Lost ✗
1996	Judy Jacobson	84,407	20.83%	Lost ✗
2000	Mark O'Keefe/Carol Williams	193,131	47.08%	Lost ✗
2004	Brian Schweitzer/John Bohlinger	225,016	50.44%	Won ✓
2008	Brian Schweitzer/John Bohlinger	318,670	65.47%	Won ✓
2012	Steve Bullock/John Walsh	236,450	48.90%	Won ✓
2016	Steve Bullock/Mike Cooney	255,933	50.25%	Won ✓
2020	Mike Cooney/Casey Schreiner	250,860	41.56%	Lost ✗
2024	Ryan Busse/Raph Graybill	232,644	38.62%	Lost ✗

== See also ==
- Political party strength in Montana
- Montana Libertarian Party
- Montana Republican Party
