= Paula Koch =

American politician

Member-elect of the Montana House of Representatives from the 4th district
- Assuming office January 2027
- Succeeding: Lyn Bennett

Personal details
- Party: Democratic

Paula Koch is an American politician. She is a member-elect of the Montana House of Representatives from the 4th district, having defeated Republican opponent Shaun Pandina in the 2026 election. Outside of politics, Koch worked in orphanages in Guatemala for several years, and currently works as a Spanish language teacher in Columbia Falls, Montana.
