= Greg DeVries =

Greg DeVries may refer to:

- Greg de Vries (born 1973), Canadian ice hockey player
- Greg DeVries (politician), member of the Montana House of Representatives
