= Brian Close (disambiguation) =

Brian Close (1931–2015) was an English cricketer and footballer.

Brian Close may also refer to:

- Brian Close (footballer, born 1982), Northern Irish footballer
- Brian Close (politician) (born 1958), American politician
