= Paul Green (American politician) =

American politician

Member of the Montana House of Representatives from the 41st district
- In office January 3, 2023 – January 10, 2024
- Preceded by: Rynalea Whiteman Pena
- Succeeded by: Gayle Lammers

Personal details
- Party: Republican

Paul Green is an American politician. He served as a Republican member for the 41st district of the Montana House of Representatives. Green resigned from the House to become the director of the Montana Department of Commerce which left the seat open.
