= Lona Running Wolf =

American politician

Member of the Montana House of Representatives from the 16th district
- Preceded by: Tyson Running Wolf

Personal details
- Party: Democratic
- Spouse: Tyson Running Wolf
- Children: 7

Lona Running Wolf is a member of the Montana House of Representatives for the 16th district. She succeeds her husband, Tyson Running Wolf.

== See also ==
- List of Native American politicians
- Native American women in politics
