= Finley Warden =

American politician

Member-elect of the Montana House of Representatives from the 13th district
- Assuming office January 2027
- Succeeding: Linda Reksten

Personal details
- Born: October 2005 (age 21)
- Party: Republican

Finley Warden (born October 2005) is an American politician. A member of the Republican Party, he is the member-elect for the 13th district of the Montana House of Representatives.
