= Shelley Vance =

American politician from Montana

Member of the Montana Senate from the 34th district
- Incumbent
- Assumed office January 2, 2023
- Preceded by: Gordon Vance

Personal details
- Party: Republican

Shelley Vance is an American politician who has served in the Montana Senate from the 34th district since 2022. Vance was a part of a moderate coalition of 9 Republicans formed with Democrats in the 69th Montana Legislature, dubbed the "nasty nine" by opponents and was censured on March 27, 2025 for her efforts. Despite this affiliation, Vance considers herself a conservative Republican and noted her votes on more conservative topics, such as restricting abortion, transgender bathroom access, and placing the Ten Commandments in schools. She posits that her "nasty nine" affiliation is policy, and not ideologically based, and that it is what her constituents want, a rebuke of the far-right wing of the Republican party.
