= Gayle Lammers =

American politician

Member of the Montana Senate from the 21st district
- Incumbent
- Assumed office January 6, 2025

Member of the Montana House of Representatives from the 41st district
- In office February 22, 2024 – January 6, 2025
- Preceded by: Paul Green

Personal details
- Party: Republican

Gayle Lammers is an American politician from Montana. He serves as a Republican member for District 21 in the Montana State Senate.

Lammers previously was in the Montana House of Representatives for the 41st. His predecessor, Paul Green, resigned from the House to become the director of the Montana Department of Commerce which left the seat open.

Lammers was a part of a moderate coalition of 9 Republicans formed with Democrats in the 69th Montana Legislature, dubbed the "nasty nine" by opponents and was censured on March 27 for his efforts.
