= Lyn Hellegaard =

American politician

Member of the Montana House of Representatives from the 97th district
- In office January 2, 2023 – January 6, 2025
- Preceded by: Brad Tschida
- Succeeded by: Melody Cunningham

Personal details
- Born: Darrellyn Bingham; March 29, 1958 (age 68) Moab, Utah, United States
- Party: Republican
- Spouse: Steve Hellegaard
- Children: 2

Darrellyn "Lyn" Hellegaard (née Bingham; born March 29, 1958) is an American politician who is currently serving as a member of the Montana House of Representatives from the 97th district. She is a member of the Republican Party.

== Biography ==
Hellegaard was born Darrellyn Bingham on March 29, 1958, in the city of Moab, Utah, to Darrell Albert Bingham (1924–2011) and Sarah Leman. She married Steven Charles "Steve" Hellegaard on April 21, 1979, in Ravalli, Montana. They have two children.
