= Gregg Hunter =

American politician

Member of the Montana Senate from the 15th district
- Incumbent
- Assumed office January 2025

Personal details
- Party: Republican

Gregg Hunter is an American politician elected to the Montana Senate from the 15th district in the 2024 election, as a member of the Republican Party. Hunter was a part of a moderate coalition of 9 Republicans formed with Democrats in the 69th Montana Legislature, dubbed the "nasty nine" by opponents and was censured on March 27 for his efforts.
