= Natalie Weeks-O'Neal =

American politician

Member of the Montana House of Representatives from the 31st district
- Preceded by: Frank Smith

Natalie Weeks-O'Neal is a member of the Montana House of Representatives for the 31st district. She is a member of the Fort Peck Assiniboine and Sioux tribe.

== See also ==
- List of Native American politicians
- Native American women in politics
