= Ron Marshall (politician) =

American politician

Member of the Montana House of Representatives from the 87th district
- In office January 4, 2021 – March 3, 2025
- Preceded by: Nancy Ballance
- Succeeded by: Terry Nelson

Personal details
- Born: 1962 (age 63–64) McClellan Air Force Base, California
- Party: Republican
- Spouse: Deanna Marshall
- Children: Two

Military service
- Allegiance: United States
- Branch/service: United States Army
- Years of service: 1982–1996

Ron Marshall is an American politician and a former Republican member of the Montana House of Representatives from the 87th district. Elected in November 2020, he assumed office on January 4, 2021.

== Career ==
Marshall served in the United States Army from 1982-1996. He has since owned and operated small businesses in Victor, Montana. Marshall is the vice president of the Montana Smoke Free Association and vice-chair for public relations the Ravalli County, Montana, Republican Central Committee. Marshall was elected to the Montana House of Representatives in November 2020 and assumed office on January 4, 2021, succeeding Nancy Ballance.

Marshall resigned on March 3, 2025, citing opposition to corruption and lobbyist dominance.

Ron Marshall
(@MarshallMT87)
tweeted:

I will be resigning from my position as representative for Montana House District 87, effective @ 12 noon today. The corruption is more than I can stand. Lobbyists run this country. They [sic] people have no voice.

Mar 3, 2025
