= Linda Reksten =

American politician

Member of the Montana House of Representatives from the 13th district
- Incumbent
- Assumed office January 6, 2025
- Preceded by: Paul Fielder
- Succeeded by: Finley Warden (elect)

Member of the Montana House of Representatives from the 12th district
- In office January 4, 2021 – January 6, 2025
- Preceded by: Greg Hertz
- Succeeded by: Tracy Sharp

Personal details
- Born: 1951 (age 74–75) Polson, Montana, U.S.
- Party: Republican
- Education: Eastern Montana College (BS); Point Loma Nazarene University (MA); University of California Los Angeles (EdD)
- Occupation: School district superintendent

Linda Reksten is an American politician from Montana. She is a Republican member of the Montana House of Representatives. In 2024 she was elected to the 13th district which covers the Polson area. Previously she was elected to the 12th district in 2020 and 2022.

Reksten worked for more than 30 years in education prior to her election. In 1982 she began her teaching career in California, working for the Burbank Unified School District. From 1986 to 2003 Reksten was the principal of Disney Elementary School. During her time as principal Disney Elementary School became the most ethnically diverse school in Burbank Unified School District, with 44% of the student population speaking limited English. She also was a college professor at Point Loma Nazarene University. Reksten published two books with Corwin Press.

Reksten first ran for election in 2020, defeating Gerry Browning. She took the seat of Greg Hertz who had reached his term limit. In 2022 she faced challenger Sterling Laudon, an attorney in Polson. She won with 62% of the vote.

Due to redistricting following the US census Reksten ran for District 13 in the 2024 elections. The Democratic candidate, Shirley Azzopardi, also spent her career as an educator. Reksten won 61% of the vote, securing her third term in the House of Representatives. She was appointed chair to the House Education Committee.
