= Greg DeVries (politician) =

American politician

Member of the Montana House of Representatives from the 75th district
- In office January 7, 2019 – January 4, 2021
- Preceded by: Kirk Wagoner
- Succeeded by: Marta Bertoglio

Personal details
- Born: 1969 or 1970 (age 56–57)
- Party: Republican

Greg DeVries (born 1969/1970) is an American politician who served as a member of the Montana House of Representatives from 2019 to 2021.

He studied at Kendall College of Art and Design, where he earned a Bachelor's degree in Science between 1985 and 1988. During the same period, he also attended South Christian High School and received his high school diploma there.
