= Gary Parry =

American politician

Member of the Montana House of Representatives from the 35th district
- Incumbent
- Assumed office January 6, 2025
- Preceded by: Brandon Ler

Member of the Montana House of Representatives from the 39th district
- In office January 2, 2023 – January 6, 2025
- Preceded by: Geraldine Custer
- Succeeded by: Kerri Seekings-Crowe

Personal details
- Party: Republican

Gary Parry is an American politician. He serves as a Republican member for the 35th district of the Montana House of Representatives. The district includes parts of five counties with the bulk of voters coming from Rosebud and Yellowstone counties.

Parry first ran for election in 2022 for House District 39 and was uncontested. The incumbent, Geraldine Custer, sought election to the Montana State Senate. During the legislative session Parry was a member of six committees. He was assigned to both the House and the Joint committees for State Administration, Natural Resources, and Fish, Wildlife and Parks.

Due to redistricting following the US census Parry ran for District 35 in the 2024 elections. He faced Democratic challenger Kim Kreider and won with 81% of the vote. During the legislative session he was assigned Chair for the Energy, Technology and Federal Relations committee. He was also a member of the State Administration, Legislative Administration, and Fish, Wildlife and Parks committees.
