= Morgan Thiel =

American politician

Member of the Montana House of Representatives from the 30th district
- Incumbent
- Assumed office January 6, 2025
- Preceded by: James H. Bergstrom

Personal details
- Party: Republican

Morgan Thiel is an American politician. She serves as a Republican member for the 30th district of the Montana House of Representatives. The 30th district includes parts of Roosevelt and Richland counties.

Thiel first ran for election in 2024. She ran unopposed during the general election. She was assigned to the Business and Labor, Natural Resources, and Agriculture committees for the 2025 legislative session.

== Personal life ==
Thiel works for the family owned Thiel Brothers Roofing in Sidney.
