= Jade Sooktis =

American politician

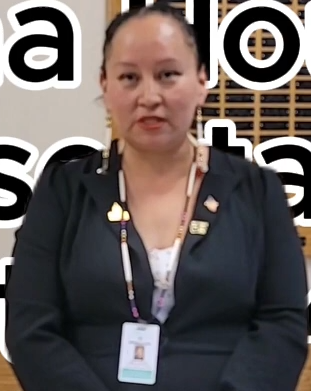
- Sooktis in 2025

Member of the Montana House of Representatives from the 41st district
- Incumbent
- Assumed office January 6, 2025
- Preceded by: Gayle Lammers

Personal details
- Party: Democratic

Jade Sooktis is an American politician from Montana. She is a Democratic Party member of the Montana House of Representatives for District 41. The district includes Big Horn County and part of Rosebud County.

== Career ==
Sooktis first ran for office in the 2024 election. Incumbent Gayle Lammers sought a position in the Montana State Senate. She defeated Republican challenger Da Wallowing Bull with 56% of the vote. For the legislative session she was assigned to the State Administration and Human Services committees.

She is a member of the American Indian Caucus.

In February 2025, she was one of three Native American legislators to walk out of a speech by Senator Tim Sheehy. Sooktis, along with Senator Jacinda Morigeau and Representative Shelly Fyant, walked out in response to Sheehy's refusal to apologize for disparaging comments he made about Indigenous people.

== See also ==
- List of Native American politicians
- Native American women in politics
