= Sidney Fitzpatrick =

American politician

Member of the Montana House of Representatives from the 42nd district
- Incumbent
- Assumed office January 6, 2025
- Preceded by: Sharon Stewart-Peregoy

Personal details
- Party: Democrat

Sidney "Chip" Fitzpatrick is an American politician. He serves as a Democratic member for the 42nd district of the Montana House of Representatives. The district includes Big Horn County and a section of Yellowstone County.

Fitzpatrick first ran for office in the 2024 Montana House of Representatives election. Incumbent Sharon Stewart-Peregoy was ineligible to run due to term limits. The Democratic Legislative Campaign Committee chose Fitzpatrick, along with two other Montana candidates, to support in the election. Fitzpatrick was the only one to win his seat. He narrowly defeated Republican opponent Bill Hodges with 52% of the vote. During the legislative session he was assigned to the Business and Labor, Transportation, and Fish, Wildlife and Parks committees.

He is a member of the American Indian Caucus.
