= Eric Albus =

American politician

Member of the Montana House of Representatives from the 28th district
- Incumbent
- Assumed office January 6, 2025
- Preceded by: Paul Tuss

Personal details
- Party: Republican

Eric Albus is an American politician. He serves as a Republican member for the 28th district of the Montana House of Representatives. The district includes parts of Cascade and Chouteau counties.

Albus first ran for election in 2024. He defeated Democrat Blake Borst with 77% of the vote. During the 2025 legislative session he was assigned to the House Appropriations committee and the Joint appropriations committee for Natural Resources and Transportation.

== Personal life ==
Albus is a rancher/farmer and works on fourth generation land. He co-owns Milk River Outfitters where he also guides archery and rifle hunting trips.
