= Valerie Moore =

American politician and businesswomen

Member of the Montana House of Representatives from the 29th district
- Incumbent
- Assumed office January 6, 2025
- Preceded by: Edward Butcher

Personal details
- Born: 1956 (age 69–70)
- Party: Republican
- Spouse: Danny
- Education: College of Great Falls

Valerie Moore is an American politician and businesswoman serving as a member of the Montana House of Representatives. A Republican, she was elected in 2024 to represent the 29th district.

Moore received an Associate of Arts from College of Great Falls.

Prior to running for the Montana House of Representatives, Moore served as a member of the Westby, Montana School Board and owned a grocery store.

During the 2024 primary she faced opposition from Republican Miles Knudsen. With 68% of the vote she advanced to the general election. Running uncontested, she won 100% of the vote. Moore took office on January 6 of 2025, succeeding Edward Butcher in representing the district. She was assigned to the Taxation and Human Services committees for the legislative session.

Moore has declared opposition to property taxation.

== Personal life ==
Moore has been married to her husband Danny for fifty years. They have two children and four grandchildren. Moore resides in Plentywood, Montana.
