= Melissa Romano =

American politician

Member of the Montana House of Representatives from the 81st district
- Incumbent
- Assumed office January 2, 2023
- Preceded by: Mary Caferro

Personal details
- Born: Spokane, Washington
- Party: Democratic
- Children: 4
- Education: Northwest College (AS); University of Bridgeport (BS, MS)

Melissa Romano is an American politician and educator serving as a member of the Montana House of Representatives for the 81st district. Elected in November 2022, she assumed office on January 2, 2023.

== Early life and education ==
Melissa Romano was born in Spokane, Washington and raised in Helena, Montana. Romano earned an associate of science degree in photography from Northwest College, a Bachelor of Science in social science from the University of Bridgeport, and a Master of Science in elementary education and teaching from the University of Bridgeport.

== Career ==
Since 2004, Romano has worked as an elementary math teacher in the Helena Public School District. In 2016 and 2020 she was a Democratic nominee for Montana Superintendent of Public Instruction. She was elected to the Montana House of Representatives in November 2022.
