= Eric Tilleman =

American politician

Member of the Montana House of Representatives from the 23rd district
- Incumbent
- Assumed office July 2024
- Preceded by: Scot Kerns

Personal details
- Party: Republican
- Education: Montana State University (BS)

Eric Tilleman is an American politician serving as a member of the Montana House of Representatives. He represents the 23rd district which covers the southern area of Great Falls and nearby towns. He was appointed to the House in July 2024, succeeding Scot Kerns who resigned. He was elected to a full term in November 2024.

== Early life and education ==
Tilleman is a native of Chinook, Montana. He earned a Bachelor of Science degree in agricultural education from Montana State University.

== Career ==
Tilleman taught agriculture at Cascade High School for 16 years. In 2014 Tilleman was awarded the Montana Career and Technical Education Teacher of the Year by the Montana Association for Career and Technical Education. He was the winner of the Ideas Unlimited award from Montana Association of Agricultural Educators in 2014.

In 2020, Tilleman began working as an agricultural education specialist in the Montana Office of Public Instruction. In 2022 he was selected as President-elect for the National Association of Agricultural Educators, then served as president for 2023–2024. Tilleman was also the fire chief in Cascade for the volunteer fire department.

Tilleman ran for Montana House District 22 in the 2014 election. While he won the primary, he dropped out prior to the general election.

Tilleman was appointed to the Montana House of Representatives in July 2024. The county commissioners selected Tilleman as he won the Republican primary in June. In the general election he defeated Democrat Sandor Hopkins and Libertarian Kevin Leatherbarrow with 56% of the vote. He was assigned to three committees for the 2025 legislative session: State Administration, Education, and Agriculture.
