= Curtis Schomer =

American politician

Member of the Montana House of Representatives from the 48th district
- Incumbent
- Assumed office January 6, 2025
- Preceded by: Jodee Etchart

Personal details
- Born: 1984 (age 41–42) Montana, U.S.
- Party: Republican
- Spouse: Haley
- Children: 3
- Occupation: Politician

Curtis Schomer (born 1984) is an American politician. He serves as a Republican member of the Montana House of Representatives representing the 48th district. He previously worked as a miner, but now works at Billings Clinic.

== Personal life ==
Schomer and his wife Haley have three children and reside in Billings, Montana.
