= Lee Deming =

American politician

Member of the Montana House of Representatives from the 55th district
- Incumbent
- Assumed office January 2, 2023

Personal details
- Born: Helena, Montana, U.S.
- Party: Republican

Lee Deming is an American politician. He serves as a Republican member for the 55th district of the Montana House of Representatives.

In February 2026, Deming introduced legislation to confer fetal personhood rights to embryos; the bill failed to pass.
