= Mark Reinschmidt =

American politician (born 1965)

Member of the Montana House of Representatives from the 75th district
- Incumbent
- Assumed office July 2025
- Preceded by: Marta Bertoglio

Personal details
- Born: 1960 (age 65–66)
- Party: Republican
- Education: Montana State University
- Occupation: artist, school board trustee

Mark Reinschmidt (born 1960), is an American politician who is serving as a member of the Montana House of Representatives from the 75th district. A Republican, Reinschmidt succeeded Marta Bertoglio who resigned in June 2025. He won reelection in 2026.

== Early life and education ==
Growing up on a ranch near Whitehall, Montana, in Jefferson County, he attended Whitehall High School. He graduated from Montana State University.

== Career ==
Reinschmidt has lived in Jefferson County for thirty years. He worked as a artist, specializing in metal sculptures and runs two businesses. Prior to his political career, he was also a trustee on the Whitehall School Board.

In June 2025, 75th district Republican incumbent Marta Bertoglio resigned to be named Montana Commerce Director. On July 16, he was interviewed by the Jefferson County Commission as one of the three candidates on the Republican shortlist. On July 22, Reinschmidt defeated more experienced politicians Terry Churchill and Kirk Wagoner and was selected to succeed Bertoglio. Reinschmidt has stated that he will seek election to the Montana Legislature in 2026. He won reelection against Democrat Patrick Sullivan.
