= Katie Fire Thunder =

American politician

Member of the Montana House of Representatives from the 59th district
- Incumbent
- Assumed office December 22, 2025
- Preceded by: Ed Stafman

Personal details
- Party: Democratic
- Education: Montana State University

Katie Fire Thunder (born 2000) is an American politician who was appointed a member of the Montana House of Representatives for the 59th district in 2025. She was appointed to replace Ed Stafman. She is a Montana State University graduate. She is a member of the Oglala Lakota Nation.

== See also ==
- List of Native American politicians
- Native American women in politics
