= Melissa Nikolakakos =

Member of the Montana House of Representatives from the 20th district
- Incumbent
- Assumed office January 6, 2025
- Preceded by: Fred Anderson

Personal details
- Born: Melissa Lynn Durden; 1982 (age 43–44) Miles City, Montana, U.S.
- Party: Republican
- Spouse: George Nikolakakos (m. 2003)
- Children: 4
- Education: Great Falls College Montana State University (AA); University of Montana Western (BA)

Melissa Lynn Nikolakakos (née Durden; born 1982) is an American politician and educator serving as a member of the Montana House of Representatives since 2025. A Republican, she represents District 20 which includes parts of Great Falls.

== Montana House of Representatives ==
Nikolakakos ran for the Montana House of Representatives in the 2024 election in the 20th district. She defeated Steven Galloway, the representative from the 24th district who switched districts due to redistricting, in the Republican primary. She won the general election against Democratic candidate Rina Fontana Moore with 53% of the vote.

== Personal life ==
Nikolakakos is married to George Nikolakakos, who has served as a state representative for the neighboring 22nd district since 2023. The couple has four children, including two that they home school.
