= Terry Nelson (politician) =

American politician

Member of the Montana House of Representatives from the 87th district
- Incumbent
- Assumed office March 10, 2025
- Preceded by: Ron Marshall

Personal details
- Party: Republican

Terry Nelson is an American politician and a Republican member of the Montana House of Representatives from the 87th district. He was unanimously appointed by Ravalli County commissioners in March 2025 to fill the seat of his predecessor Ron Marshall, who resigned the week prior. Nelson, who previously served as the chair of the Ravalli County Republican Party, has been involved in county Republican politics for two decades.
