= Denise Joy =

American politician

Member of the Montana House of Representatives from the 46th district
- Incumbent
- Assumed office January 6, 2025
- Preceded by: Katie Zolnikov

Personal details
- Party: Democratic

Denise Joy is an American politician, serving as a member of the Montana House of Representatives for the 46th district since 2025. A member of the Democratic Party, she previously served on the Billings City Council, where she became the first member of the Democratic Socialists of America to ever be elected to public office in Montana.

During the 2024 elections, Emma Kerr-Carpenter won the seat for House District 46. However, Kerr-Carpenter was selected to replace Kathy Kelker in the state Senate due to her resignation. Joy was selected by the Yellowstone county commission to replace Kerr-Carpenter.

== Personal life ==
Joy currently lives in Billings but grew up in Hardin, Montana. Joy is a special needs assistant for Billings Public Schools.
