= Shannon Maness =

American politician

Member of the Montana House of Representatives from the 70 district
- Incumbent
- Assumed office January 2024
- Preceded by: Julie Dooling

Personal details
- Born: Nashville, Tennessee
- Education: University of Georgia

Shannon Maness is an American politician elected to the Montana House of Representatives from the 70th district in the 2024 election, as a member of the Republican Party.
