= Jennifer Lynch (politician) =

American politician

Member of the Montana House of Representatives from the 73rd district
- Incumbent
- Assumed office January 2, 2023
- Preceded by: Jim Keane

Personal details
- Born: Butte, Montana, U.S.
- Party: Democratic
- Relations: J. D. Lynch (father)

Jennifer Lynch is an American politician serving as a member of the Montana House of Representatives for the 73rd district. Elected in November 2022, she assumed office on January 2, 2023. She is the daughter of J. D. Lynch.

== Career ==
Outside of politics, Lynch is a teacher and the negotiating chairperson of the Butte Teachers' Union. She was elected to the Montana House of Representatives in November 2022 and assumed office on January 2, 2023.
