= Mark Thane =

American politician

Member of the Montana House of Representatives from the 99th district
- Incumbent
- Assumed office January 4, 2021
- Preceded by: Marilyn Ryan

Personal details
- Born: Missoula, Montana, U.S.
- Party: Democratic
- Spouse: Mary Hensleigh Thane
- Children: 2
- Education: University of Montana (BA, MEd)

Mark Thane is an American politician serving as a member of the Montana House of Representatives from the 99th district. Elected in November 2020, he assumed office on January 4, 2021.

== Early life and education ==
Thane was born and raised in Missoula, Montana. He earned a Bachelor of Arts degree and Master of Education from the University of Montana.

== Career ==
Prior to entering politics, Thane worked as a teacher and administrator in the Missoula County Public Schools for 39 years. From 2013 to 2015, he served as director of human resources and labor relations for the school district and later served as superintendent until his retirement in 2019.
