= Sherry Essmann =

American politician

Member of the Montana House of Representatives from the 52nd district
- Incumbent
- Assumed office June 11, 2021
- Preceded by: Jimmy Patelis

Personal details
- Party: Republican

Sherry Essmann is an American politician. She serves as a Republican member for the 52nd district of the Montana House of Representatives. She was appointed in June 2021 to replace resigned representative Jimmy Patelis.
