= James Reavis (Montana politician) =

American politician

Member of the Montana House of Representatives from the 47th district
- Incumbent
- Assumed office January 6, 2025
- Preceded by: Denise Baum

Personal details
- Born: 1983 (age 42–43) Butte, Montana
- Party: Democratic

James Reavis is an American politician from Montana. He serves as a Democratic member for the 47th district of the Montana House of Representatives. The district roughly includes downtown and south Billings, Montana.

Reavis first ran for office in the 2022 Montana House of Representatives election for House District 50. He lost to Mallerie Stromswold with 48% of the vote.

Reavis ran again in 2024 for the 47th district. Montana districts had changed beginning with the 2024 election. He defeated Republican Stephanie Moncada with 53% of the vote. During the legislative session he was assigned to the Taxation, Human Services, and Rules committees.

== Personal life ==
Reavis was born in Butte, Montana. He received his J.D. degree from the University of Montana and worked as a public defender for eleven years. He is now in private practice.
