= Jamie Isaly =

American politician (born 1960)

Member of the Montana House of Representatives from the 58th district
- Incumbent
- Assumed office January 2025
- Preceded by: Brad Baker

Personal details
- Born: 1960 (age 65–66) Pittsburgh, Pennsylvania, United States
- Party: Democratic
- Spouse: Traci Isaly
- Education: Montana State University

Jamie Isaly (born 1960) is an American politician elected to the Montana House of Representatives from the 58th district in the 2024 election, as a member of the Democratic Party. He is a retired teacher.

== Electoral history ==
Montana House of Representatives 58th district general election, 2024
Party	Candidate	Votes	%
Democratic	Jamie Isaly	3,690	53.59
Republican	Jason Gunderson	3,196	46.41
Total votes		6,886	100%
