= Shane Klakken =

American politician

Member of the Montana House of Representatives from the 37th district
- Incumbent
- Assumed office January 6, 2025
- Preceded by: Jerry Schillinger

Personal details
- Party: Republican

Shane Klakken is an American politician. He serves as a Republican member for the 37th district of the Montana House of Representatives. The district covers Fergus and Petroleum counties.

Klakken first ran for election in 2024. Due to redistricting following the US census incumbent Jerry Schillinger ran for District 34. Klakken defeated Democratic challenger Andrea Payne with 74% of the votes.

== Personal life ==
Klakken was born in Lewistown, Montana. He attended the University of Montana where he joined the Army Reserve Officers' Training Corps. After active service he joined the Montana Army National Guard. He also worked as a law enforcement pilot for U.S. Customs and Border Protection.
