= Josh Seckinger =

American politician

Member of the Montana House of Representatives from the 62nd district
- Incumbent
- Assumed office January 2025
- Preceded by: Ed Stafman

Personal details
- Born: 1985 (age 40–41) Florida, U.S
- Party: Democratic
- Education: University of Wisconsin

Josh Seckinger is an American politician elected to the Montana House of Representatives from the 62nd district in the 2024 election, as a member of the Democratic Party. Josh Seckinger previously was a candidate for U.S. Senate in Montana in 2020, he dropped out before the Democratic Primary and endorsed eventual nominee Governor Steve Bullock.

== Electoral history ==
Montana House of Representatives 62nd district general election, 2024
Party	Candidate	Votes	%
Democratic	Josh Seckinger	2,926	51.06
Republican	Owen Lang	2,804	48.94
Total votes		5,730	100%
