= Stacy Zinn =

American politician

Member of the Montana House of Representatives from the 52nd district
- Incumbent
- Assumed office December 9, 2025
- Succeeded by: William W. Mercer

Personal details
- Party: Republican

Stacy Zinn is an American politician who was appointed a member of the Montana House of Representatives for the 52nd district in 2025. She was appointed to replace William W. Mercer. She was a candidate in the Republican primary in the 2024 Montana House of Representatives election.
