= Steven Kelly (politician) =

American politician

Member of the Montana House of Representatives from the 9th district
- Incumbent
- Assumed office January 6, 2025
- Preceded by: Tony Brockman

Personal details
- Born: San Luis Obispo, California
- Party: Republican

Steven Kelly is an American politician and law enforcement officer. A Republican, he was elected in the 2024 Montana House of Representatives election to represent the 9th district. In the general election, he defeated Democratic candidate Joanne Morrow with 74% of the vote. He is assigned to the House Judiciary and House Human Services committees.

Prior to his election, Kelly was a police officer. Kelly has described himself as a conservative Republican, and has declared opposition to property taxes, described illegal immigration as a federal threat, and has declared opposition to political bias in the Montana Supreme Court.

== Personal ==
Kelly retired as a Sheriff's Deputy from Washoe County, Nevada. He has a Master's degree in Management.
