= Ed Byrne (American politician) =

American politician

Member of the Montana House of Representatives from the 11th district
- Incumbent
- Assumed office January 6, 2025
- Preceded by: Tanner Smith

Personal details
- Born: 1965 (age 60–61) Spokane, Washington

Ed Byrne is an American politician. The Republican was elected in 2024 to represent the 11th district, an area east of Kalispell. He defeated Democratic candidate Jennifer Allen with 76% of the vote.

== Personal life ==
Prior to his election, Byrne was a colonel in the United States Army. He obtained his undergraduate degree from the University of Montana then received post-graduate education from three universities. He was in the MPA program at George Mason University, obtained a Masters in Science and Administration from Central Michigan University, and a Masters in Strategic Studies at the US Army War College.
