= George Nikolakakos =

American politician

Member of the Montana House of Representatives from the 26th district
- Incumbent
- Assumed office January 2, 2023
- Preceded by: Jeremy Trebas

Personal details
- Born: November 24, 1979 (age 46) Albrightsville, Pennsylvania, U.S.
- Spouse: Melissa Nikolakakos
- Children: 4

Military service
- Allegiance: United States
- Branch/service: United States Air Force
- Years of service: 2002–2022
- Rank: Senior Master Sergeant
- Battles/wars: War in Afghanistan Iraq War Syrian Civil War

George Peter Nikolakakos (born November 24, 1979) is an American politician who is currently serving as a member of the Montana House of Representatives from District 26. He is a member of the Republican Party.

Nikolakakos first ran for the Montana legislature in 2022. He ran for House District 22 which covers eastern Great Falls and Malmstrom Air Force Base. He defeated Marci Marceau in the primaries with 58% of the vote. He then faced Kari Rosenleaf in the general election, winning with 57% of the vote. In 2024 James Whitaker challenged him in the primaries. Nikolakakos took 72% of the vote. For the general election he defeated Democrat Ronald Paulick with 61% of the vote. He was appointed Chair of the Legislative Administration committee in the 2025 session.

== Biography ==
Nikolakakos was born on November 24, 1979, in Albrightsville, Pennsylvania, to Peter and Debra Jean Nikolakakos, the oldest of two children. He married Melissa Lynn Durden on November 22, 2003, in Reno, Nevada. They live with their four children in Great Falls, Montana. His wife became the Representative for Montana House District 20 in 2025.

== Military service ==
Shortly after the September 11 attacks, Nikolakakos enlisted into the United States Air Force, serving 20 years from 2001 to 2021 before leaving with the rank of Senior Master Sergeant. During his time in the Air Force, Nikolakakos served in the War in Afghanistan, the Iraq War, and the Syrian Civil War. He also spent some of his time in the military with the Montana Air National Guard, where he was Superintendent of Intelligence for the 120th Air Wing and a Nuclear Accountability Officer at Malmstrom Air Force Base. Nikolakakos claims to have maintained fluency in five different languages due to his time in the Air Force.

== Personal life ==
Nikolakakos is married to Melissa Nikolakakos who has served as a state representative since 2025. The couple has four children, including two that they home school.
