= Kila, Montana =

Unincorporated community in Montana, United States

- Census-designated place
- Location within Montana Location within the United States
- Coordinates: 48°07′28″N 114°28′50″W
- Country: United States
- State: Montana
- County: Flathead

Area
  - Total: 3.98 sq mi (10.30 km^{2})
  - Land: 3.98 sq mi (10.30 km^{2})
  - Water: 0 sq mi (0.00 km^{2})
- Elevation: 3,570 ft (1,090 m)

Population (2020)
  - Total: 424
  - Density: 106.6/sq mi (41.17/km^{2})
- Time zone: UTC-7 (Mountain (MST))
  - Summer (DST): UTC-6 (MDT)
- ZIP code: 59920
- Area code: 406
- GNIS feature ID: 2583819

Kila is a census-designated place and unincorporated community in Flathead County, Montana, United States. Its population was 424 as of the 2020 census. Kila has a post office with ZIP code 59920, which opened on May 27, 1901. The community is located along U.S. Route 2, 10 miles from Kalispell.

Originally called Sedan by the Great Northern Railway when homesteaders settled the area in 1892, the name was changed after William Kiley when Kiley filed for a post office in 1901. The town was platted in 1914.

== Climate ==
This climatic region is typified by large seasonal temperature differences, with warm to hot (and often humid) summers and cold (sometimes severely cold) winters. According to the Köppen Climate Classification system, Kila has a humid continental climate, abbreviated "Dfb" on climate maps.

== Demographics ==
Historical population
Census	Pop.	Note	%±
2010	392		—
2020	424		8.2%
U.S. Decennial Census

== Education ==
The Kila School District educates students in the area.
