= Pete Elverum =

American politician

Member of the Montana House of Representatives
- Incumbent
- Assumed office January 6, 2025
- Preceded by: Mary Caferro
- Constituency: 82nd District

Personal details
- Born: Salem, Oregon
- Party: Democratic
- Website: Official website

Pete Elverum is a member of the Montana House of Representatives, representing the 82nd district.

== Career ==
Elverum has been East Helena city attorney since 2015. He served in the Montana National Guard for 14 years.

== Personal life ==
Elverum is a Lutheran, and has 4 children.
