= Peter Strand =

American politician

Member of the Montana House of Representatives from the 63rd district
- Incumbent
- Assumed office January 2025
- Preceded by: Alice Buckley

Personal details
- Born: 1965 (age 60–61) San Francisco, California, U.S
- Party: Democratic
- Education: Occidental College (BA) Lesley University (M.ED.)

Peter Strand is an American politician elected to the Montana House of Representatives from the 63rd district in the 2024 election, as a member of the Democratic Party. He is a retired public schools teacher.

== Electoral history ==
Montana House of Representatives 63rd district general election, 2024
Party	Candidate	Votes	%
Democratic	Peter Strand	3,255	53.42
Republican	Mark Lewis	2,838	46.58
Total votes		6,093	100%
