= Courtenay Sprunger =

American politician and public relations executive

Member of the Montana House of Representatives from the 7th district
- Incumbent
- Assumed office January 2, 2023
- Preceded by: Frank Garner

Personal details
- Born: 1981 (age 44–45)
- Occupation: Owner and CEO of Big Sky Public Relations

Courtenay Sprunger is an American politician and public relations executive, serving in the Montana House of Representatives for District 7 since 2023. A member of the Republican Party, Sprunger is the owner of Big Sky Public Relations in Kalispell. She was elected in 2022, after defeating Democratic nominee Angela Kennedy in the general election. Sprunger was one of four Republicans that voted against an amendment to the 2025 Montana legislature's joint rules that would have prohibited transgender individuals from entering certain Capitol bathrooms. Later, Sprunger voted in favor of HB121 (2025), a bill which more broadly provided privacy in certain restrooms, changing rooms, and sleeping quarters according to their biological gender.

Sprunger ran for re-election in 2024. She defeated Arthur Fretheim with 65% of the vote. Public education and housing affordability were a major focus of the election.

Sprunger is a graduate of Vanguard University.
