= Eric Matthews (politician) =

American politician (born 1974)

Member of the Montana House of Representatives from the 66th district
- Incumbent
- Assumed office January 2, 2023
- Preceded by: Denise Hayman

Personal details
- Born: 1974 (age 51–52) Bozeman, Montana
- Party: Democratic

Eric Matthews (born 1974) is an American politician. He is a Democrat representing the 66th District in the Montana House of Representatives.

== Political career ==
In 2022, former District 66 Representative Denise Hayman did not run for re-election. Matthews ran for the seat and was unopposed in both the Democratic primary and the general election.

Matthews ran for re-election in the 2024 Montana House of Representatives election, winning with 56% of the vote.

== Electoral history ==
2022 Montana House of Representatives 66th district general election
Party	Candidate	Votes	%
Democratic	Eric Matthews	3,739	100%
Total votes		3,739	100%
Democratic hold			
