= Scott Rosenzweig =

American politician (born 1963)

Member of the Montana House of Representatives from the 57th district
- Incumbent
- Assumed office January 6, 2025
- Preceded by: Fiona Nave

Personal details
- Born: 1963 (age 62–63) Tucson, Arizona, United States
- Party: Democratic
- Education: Wesleyan University (BA) Cornell University (MBA)

Scott Rosenzweig (born 1963) is an American politician elected to the Montana House of Representatives from the 57th district in the 2024 election, as a member of the Democratic Party. Representative Rosenzweig's race was the closest in the Montana State House of Representatives in 2024, and was the only to have a recount. In the recount the margin shrunk from 20 votes in Rosenzweig's favor to 17 votes.

Representative Rosenzweig was elected to Montana State Senate District 29 in the November 2026 election.

== Electoral history ==
Montana House of Representatives 57th district general election, 2024
Party	Candidate	Votes	%
Democratic	Scott Rosenzweig	3,802	50.11%
Republican	Marty Malone	3,785	49.89%
Total votes		7,587	100%
