= Thedis Crowe =

American politician

Member of the Montana House of Representatives from the 15th district
- Incumbent
- Assumed office January 2025
- Preceded by: Marvin Weatherwax Jr.

Personal details
- Party: Democratic
- Education: Montana State University

Thedis Crowe is an American politician elected to the Montana House of Representatives in the 2024 election She is a member of the Democratic Party. Crowe represents the 15th district which covers a significant area. It includes parts of Glacier, Pondera, Flathead, and Lake counties. Major towns include South Browning, Heart Butte, and St. Ignatius. Also notable for the district is that two reservations are represented - the Blackfeet Indian Reservation and the Flathead Indian Reservation.

Crowe's opponent in 2024 was Ralph Foster. She won with 52% of the vote.

== Personal life ==
Crowe was born in Browning, Montana. She worked in the Federal government at both the USDA Natural Resources Conservation Service and the Bureau of Indian Affairs. She received both her bachelor's and master's degrees at Montana State University.

== See also ==
- List of Native American politicians
- Native American women in politics
