= Tom Millett =

American politician

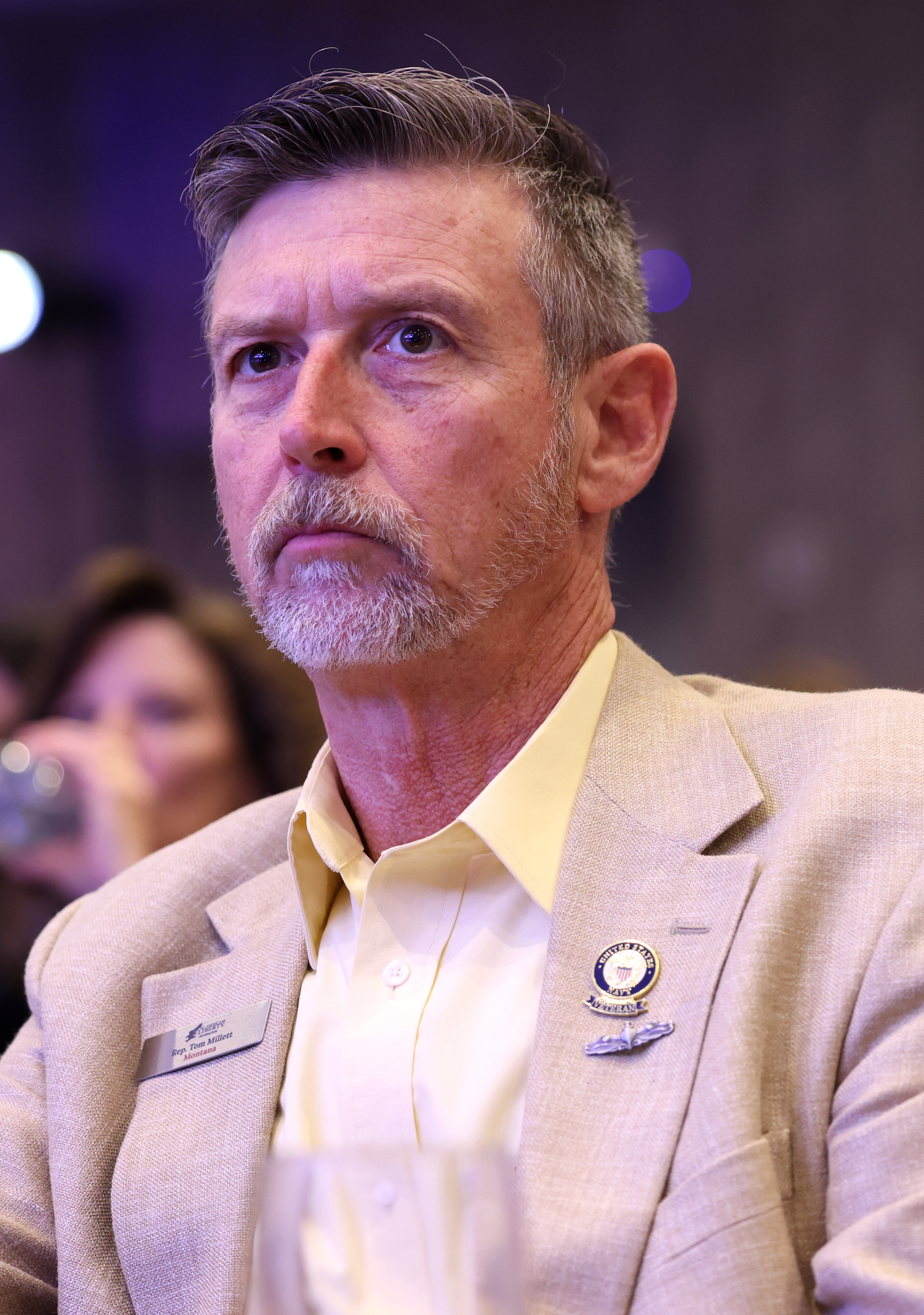
- Millett at the 2024 Hazlitt Summit hosted by Young Americans for Liberty Foundation

Member of the Montana House of Representatives from the 2nd district
- Incumbent
- Assumed office January 6, 2025
- Preceded by: Neil Duram

Personal details
- Party: Republican
- Children: 2

Tom Millett is an American politician. He is a Republican member of the Montana House of Representatives. He represents District 2, covering most of Lincoln County as well as some of the surrounding area.

Due to redistricting, which happens every 10 years in Montana, the general area District 1 covered became covered by District 2. So while technically Millett succeeds Neil Duram for District 2, the area was previously represented by Steve Gunderson. Gunderson officially endorsed Millett in May 2024.

Millett was elected in 2024, defeating Brad Simonis with 4,600 votes to 1,245. He has been assigned to four committees: House Judiciary, House Energy, Technology and Federal Relations, House Fish, Wildlife and Parks, and House Rules.

== Personal life ==
Millett served in the US Navy and is a Persian Gulf War veteran.
