= Bob Carter (American politician) =

American politician

Member of the Montana House of Representatives from the 98th district
- Incumbent
- Assumed office January 2, 2023
- Preceded by: Willis Curdy

Personal details
- Born: Great Falls, Montana
- Party: Democratic
- Spouse: Laurie
- Children: 3
- Education: University of Montana

Bob Carter is an American politician representing the 98th district in the Montana House of Representatives. A Democrat, he has represented the district since 2023.

== Political career ==
Carter previously served four terms on the school board of Target Range School District. Carter was elected to the Montana House of Representatives in 2022.

=== Committee assignments ===
During the 68th Legislative session

- Agriculture
- Business and Labor
- Transportation

During the 69th Legislative session

- Agriculture
- Business and Labor
- Energy and Technology

== Personal life ==
Carter lives in Missoula, Montana with his wife, Laurie, and their three children. Carter is an atheist.
