= Marc Lee (politician) =

American politician

Member of the Montana House of Representatives from the 74th district
- Incumbent
- Assumed office January 6, 2025

Personal details
- Party: Democratic

Marc Lee is an American politician who has been a member of the Montana House of Representatives for the 74th district in 2025.
