= Tracy Sharp =

American politician

Member of the Montana House of Representatives from the 12 district
- Incumbent
- Assumed office January 6, 2025

Personal details
- Born: Stanley, Wisconsin
- Party: Republican
- Education: Purdue University (BS)

Military service
- Branch/service: United States Air Force

Tracy Sharp is an American politician and Air Force veteran, serving as a member of the Montana House of Representatives since 2025. A member of the Republican Party, Sharp represents the 12th district, including Bigfork, Flathead Lake, and Polson.
