= Melody Cunningham =

American politician

Member of the Montana House of Representatives from the 97 district
- Incumbent
- Assumed office January 6, 2025
- Preceded by: Lyn Hellegaard

Personal details
- Born: 1958 (age 67–68) Augusta, Maine
- Party: Democratic
- Spouse: Michael Rohrer
- Children: 1
- Education: Wesley College (BA), University of Massachusetts (MD)

Melody Cunningham is an American politician elected to the Montana House of Representatives from the 97th district in the 2024 election, as a member of the Democratic Party.
