= Alanah Griffith =

American politician

Member of the Montana House of Representatives from the 60th district
- Incumbent
- Assumed office January 6, 2025
- Preceded by: Laurie Bishop

Personal details
- Born: 1963 (age 62–63) Bozeman, Montana, United States
- Party: Democratic
- Education: University of Montana (JD)

Alanah Griffith is an American politician elected to the Montana House of Representatives from the 60th district in the 2024 election, as a member of the Democratic Party. Representative Griffith previously ran for the Montana House of Representatives and lost to incumbent Jane Gillette in 2022.

== Electoral history ==
=== District 64 ===
Montana House of Representatives 64th district election, 2022
Primary election
Party	Candidate	Votes	%
Democratic	Alanah Griffith	905	73.94%
Democratic	Michelle Vered	319	26.06%
Total votes		1,224	100.00%
General election
Republican	Jane Gillette (incumbent)	3,551	53.80%
Democratic	Alanah Griffith	2,871	43.50%
Libertarian	Doug Campbell	178	2.70%
Total votes		6,600	100.00%
Republican hold			

=== District 60 ===
Montana House of Representatives 60th district election, 2024
Primary election
Party	Candidate	Votes	%
Democratic	Alanah Griffith	1,119	100.00%
Total votes		1,119	100.00%
General election
Democratic	Alanah Griffith	3,338	52.16%
Republican	Jerry Johnson	3,062	47.84%
Total votes		6,400	100.00%
Democratic hold			
