= Jane Weber =

American politician

Member of the Montana House of Representatives from the 19th district
- Incumbent
- Assumed office January 6, 2025
- Preceded by: Russ Miner

Personal details
- Party: Democratic
- Education: University of Montana; Clemson University

Jane Weber is an American politician in the Montana House of Representatives. She was elected to the 19th district in the 2024 election, as a member of the Democratic Party. District 19 covers downtown Great Falls.

In the 2024 elections, Weber defeated Hannah Trebas with 55% of the vote. Redistricting caused the incumbent, Russ Miner, to seek election in District 26. She was assigned to the House Taxation and House Human Services committees in the 2025 legislative session.

== Personal life ==
Weber holds two bachelor's degrees: one in art education and the other in forest science. She completed post-graduate studies in outdoor recreation. She was a Cascade County commissioner for ten years. She also worked in the Forest Service. She was instrumental in developing the Lewis and Clark Interpretive Center in Great Falls. She then served ten years managing the Center. She has been on several non-profit boards including the Black Eagle Superfund Cleanup committee, Mental Health Local Advisory Council, and City-County Library Board.

== Electoral history ==
Montana House of Representatives 19th district general election, 2024
Party	Candidate	Votes	%
Democratic	Jane Weber	1,787	54.61%
Republican	Hannah Trebas	1,485	45.39%
Total votes		3,272	100%
