= Fiona Nave =

American politician (born 1954)

Member of the Montana House of Representatives from the 57th district
- Incumbent
- Assumed office January 4, 2021
- Preceded by: Forrest Mandeville

Personal details
- Born: 1954 (age 71–72) Manitowoc, Wisconsin, U.S.
- Party: Republican
- Spouse: Brent
- Children: 2
- Education: California State Polytechnic University, Pomona (BS)

Military service
- Branch/service: United States Navy

Fiona Nave is an American politician serving as a member of the Montana House of Representatives from the 57th district. Elected in November 2020, she assumed office on January 4, 2021. In November 2022 she was re-elected to a second term. In April 2023 she was inducted into the Freedom Caucus of Montana.

== Early life and education ==
Nave was raised in Laurel, Montana. She earned a Bachelor of Science degree in applied mathematics from California State Polytechnic University, Pomona.

== Career ==
Nave served as an operations research analyst and computer specialist for the United States Navy for 26 years. She has served as the chair of the Stillwater County, Montana Republican Central Committee since 2015 and was also a member of her local ambulance district. Nave was elected to the Montana House of Representatives in November 2020 and assumed office on January 4, 2021.

== Personal life ==
Nave's husband, Brent Nave, worked as an engineer for the Navy. They have two children.
