= Brad Barker =

American politician

Member of the Montana House of Representatives from the 58th district
- Incumbent
- Assumed office January 2, 2023
- Preceded by: Seth Berglee

Personal details
- Born: 1972 (age 53–54) Altus, Oklahoma, U.S.
- Party: Republican
- Spouse: Carla Barker
- Education: Georgetown University Masters in Public Policy, 2004, Marine Corps University, Masters in Military Studies, 2006
- Alma mater: U.S. Military Academy at West Point, Bachelor of Science in Mathematical Economics, 1994
- Occupation: Businessman, public servant and retired US Army aviation officer

Brad Barker is an American public servant from the state of Montana who has served as a member of the Montana House of Representatives from the 58th district since 2023.

== Early life and career ==
Barker was born in Altus, Oklahoma, raised on a farm and ranch near Snyder, Oklahoma, and graduated from high-school in Snyder. He left Oklahoma for the United States Military Academy at West Point at 17 years old and graduated in 1994. Upon graduation, he received his commission as a second lieutenant in the United States Army as an aviation officer.

Brad served over 20 years in multiple command and staff assignments up through Aviation Battalion Task Force Command in Afghanistan with over 600 personnel and 49 aircraft. Over the course of his career, he served in South Korea, Germany, the Balkans, Iraq, and Afghanistan. In addition, he served as a military advisor to the Deputy Secretary of Defense for Military Personnel Policy at the Pentagon in 2005. Brad is a master army aviator rated in the UH-1 (Huey), OH-58 A/C (Kiowa), AH-64A (Apache) and AH-64D (Longbow) with multiple deployments to Afghanistan, Iraq, the Balkans and Korea. He also received four Bronze Star Medals and three Air Medals for leadership in combat.

He moved to Jackson, Wyoming, after his retirement from the US Army and was selected as the chief operating officer of Teton County School District Number 1. He served from 2014 until 2016.

== Montana House of Representatives ==
Barker serves on the Agriculture, Taxation, Transport, and is the chairman of the Interim Legislative Consumer committees.

He helped author legislation to increase literacy rates among children in 2023 and held a press conference alongside Governor Greg Gianforte on the issue of education.

== Electoral history ==
Montana House of Representatives 58th district general election, 2022
Party	Candidate	Votes	%
Republican	Brad Barker	3,841	66.44%
Democratic	Judith P. Gregory	1,940	33.56%
Total votes		5,781	100%
Republican hold			
