= Scott DeMarois =

American politician

Member of the Montana House of Representatives from the 71st district
- Incumbent
- Assumed office January 6, 2025
- Preceded by: Ken Walsh

Personal details
- Party: Democratic

Scott DeMarois is an American politician elected to the Montana House of Representatives from the 71st district in the 2024 election, as a member of the Democratic Party.
