= Lyn Bennett =

American politician

Lyn Bennet

Member of the Montana House of Representatives from the 4th district
- Incumbent
- Assumed office January 6, 2025
- Preceded by: Matt Regier

Personal details
- Party: Republican
- Children: 3
- Website: https://www.lynbennettformontanahd4.com/

Lyn Bennett is an American politician. A Republican, she is a member of the Montana House of Representatives representing the 4th district. Prior to her election in 2024, Bennett sought membership in the house for the 6th district in the 2022 Montana House of Representatives election, though she was defeated by incumbent Democrat Dave Fern.

Bennett has voiced her opposition to property taxation, support for the Second Amendment to the United States Constitution, and considers herself a conservative Republican.

== Life ==
Bennett earned a bachelor's degree in nursing, and worked as a nurse for 20 years. She serves as the director of Glacier County Pachyderm, which supports Republican candidates.
