= Brian Close (politician) =

American politician (born 1958)

Member of the Montana House of Representatives from the 65th district
- Incumbent
- Assumed office January 1, 2025
- Preceded by: Kelly Kortum

Personal details
- Born: 1958 (age 67–68) Northbrook, Illinois
- Party: Democratic Party
- Spouse: Beth Boyson
- Education: University of Chicago, New York University School of Law, Montana State University
- Website: brianclose4montana.net

Brian Close (born 1958) is an American politician who is a Democratic member of the Montana House of Representatives, representing the 65th district. He was first elected in 2024, defeating Republican nominee Esther Fishbaugh with 56% of the vote.

== Personal life and career ==
Close was born in Northbrook, Illinois, in 1958, and moved to Montana in 1994. He attended the University of Chicago, New York University Law School, and earned a master's degree at Montana State University.

== Political views ==
=== Lab-grown meat ===
Close voted against a bill in April 2025 to criminalize the sale of lab-grown meat.

=== Public transportation ===
Close authored a bill in March 2025 to allow public transportation in cities such as Billings to serve areas outside of immediate city limits, which was previously banned.

=== Vaccines ===
Close was one of the main opponents of legislation that would have banned mRNA vaccines in Montana.

== See also ==
- Montana House of Representatives
