= Tyson Running Wolf =

American politician

Member of the Montana House of Representatives from the 16th district
- Incumbent
- Assumed office January 7, 2019
- Preceded by: Susan Webber

Personal details
- Born: Browning, Montana, U.S.
- Party: Democratic
- Spouse: Lona
- Children: 7
- Education: University of Montana (BS)

Tyson T. Running Wolf is an American politician, serving as a member of the Montana House of Representatives from the 16th district since 2019. A member of the Democratic Party, his district is located in Glacier County and includes North Browning, East Glacier, and Cut Bank. Running Wolf is a Minority Whip in the 2025 legislative session.

== Career ==
Running Wolf first ran for the Montana House of Representatives in 2018. He defeated K. Webb Galbreath with 61% of the vote. In 2020 and 2022, he was unopposed. He faced challenger Elaine Utterback Mitchell during the 2024 election. Running Wolf received 59% of the vote.

Running Wolf was assigned to the same three committees in 2019, 2021, and 2023:

- Education
- Fish, Wildlife, and Parks
- State Administration

In 2025 he was again assigned to Fish, Wildlife and Parks and State Administration. He was also on the House Rules committee.

One important issue for Running Wolf is protecting the Badger-Two Medicine, an area of the Lewis and Clark National Forest sacred to the Blackfeet Nation.

In 2025, he successfully brought a bill to create a special revenue account for the Montana Missing Indigenous Persons Task Force. Montana's rate for Missing and Murdered Indigenous Women is one of the worst in the country.

== Personal life ==
At age 21, Running Wolf became a professional outdoor guide. He worked for Smoke Elser, owner of Wilderness Outfitters, and later created his own guide business. He earned a Bachelor of Science degree in forest research management from the University of Montana in 2001. Running Wolf and his wife are co-founders of Blackfeet Eco Knowledge, where he is CEO.

Running Wolf is a member of the Blackfeet Nation.

== Electoral history ==
2018 general election: Montana House of Representatives, District 16
Party	Candidate	Votes	%
Democratic	Tyson Running Wolf	2,039	61.4%
Republican	K. Webb Galbreath	1,280	38.6%

2020 general election: Montana House of Representatives, District 16
Party	Candidate	Votes	%
Democratic	Tyson Running Wolf	3,237	100.0%

2022 general election: Montana House of Representatives, District 16
Party	Candidate	Votes	%
Democratic	Tyson Running Wolf	1,605	100.0%

2024 general election: Montana House of Representatives, District 16
Party	Candidate	Votes	%
Democratic	Tyson Running Wolf	2,455	59.3%
Republican	Elaine Utterback Mitchell	1,682	40.7%
