= Mary Caferro =

American politician

Member of the Montana House of Representatives
- Incumbent
- Assumed office January 7, 2019
- Preceded by: Janet Ellis
- Constituency: 81st District
- In office January 3, 2005 – January 3, 2011
- Succeeded by: Liz Bangerter
- Constituency: 80th District

Member of the Montana Senate
- In office January 5, 2015 – January 7, 2019
- Preceded by: Christine Kaufmann
- Succeeded by: Janet Ellis
- Constituency: 41st District
- In office January 3, 2011 – January 5, 2015
- Preceded by: Mike Cooney
- Succeeded by: Christine Kaufmann
- Constituency: 40th District

Personal details
- Born: 1959 (age 66–67) Whitefish, Montana
- Party: Democratic
- Children: 4
- Education: Helena College
- Occupation: Organizer, advocate
- Website: MaryCaferro.com

Mary M. Caferro is a Democratic member of the Montana House of Representatives, having first served between 2005 and 2011, and again starting in 2019. From 2011 to 2019 she served as a Democratic member of the Montana Senate.

== Personal life ==
Caferro was born and raised in Whitefish, Montana. She has lived in Helena, Montana since 1984.

She is the mother of four children. Caferro is currently the director of The Arc Montana, a disability rights organization.
