= Montana House of Representatives =

Lower house of the Montana Legislature

Coordinates: 46°35′09″N 112°01′06″W

- Montana State Legislature

Type
- Type: Lower house
- Term limits: 4 terms (8 years)

History
- New session started: January 6, 2025

Leadership
- Speaker: Brandon Ler (R) since January 6, 2025
- Speaker pro tempore: Katie Zolnikov (R) since January 6, 2025
- Majority Leader: Steve Fitzpatrick (R) since January 6, 2025
- Minority Leader: Katie Sullivan (D) since January 6, 2025

Structure
- Seats: 100
- Political groups: Majority: Republican (58); Minority: Democratic (42)
- Length of term: 2 years
- Authority: Article V, Montana Constitution
- Salary: $128.88/day + per diem

Elections
- Last election: November 5, 2024 (100 seats)
- Next election: November 3, 2026 (100 seats)
- Redistricting: Montana Districting and Apportionment Commission

Meeting place
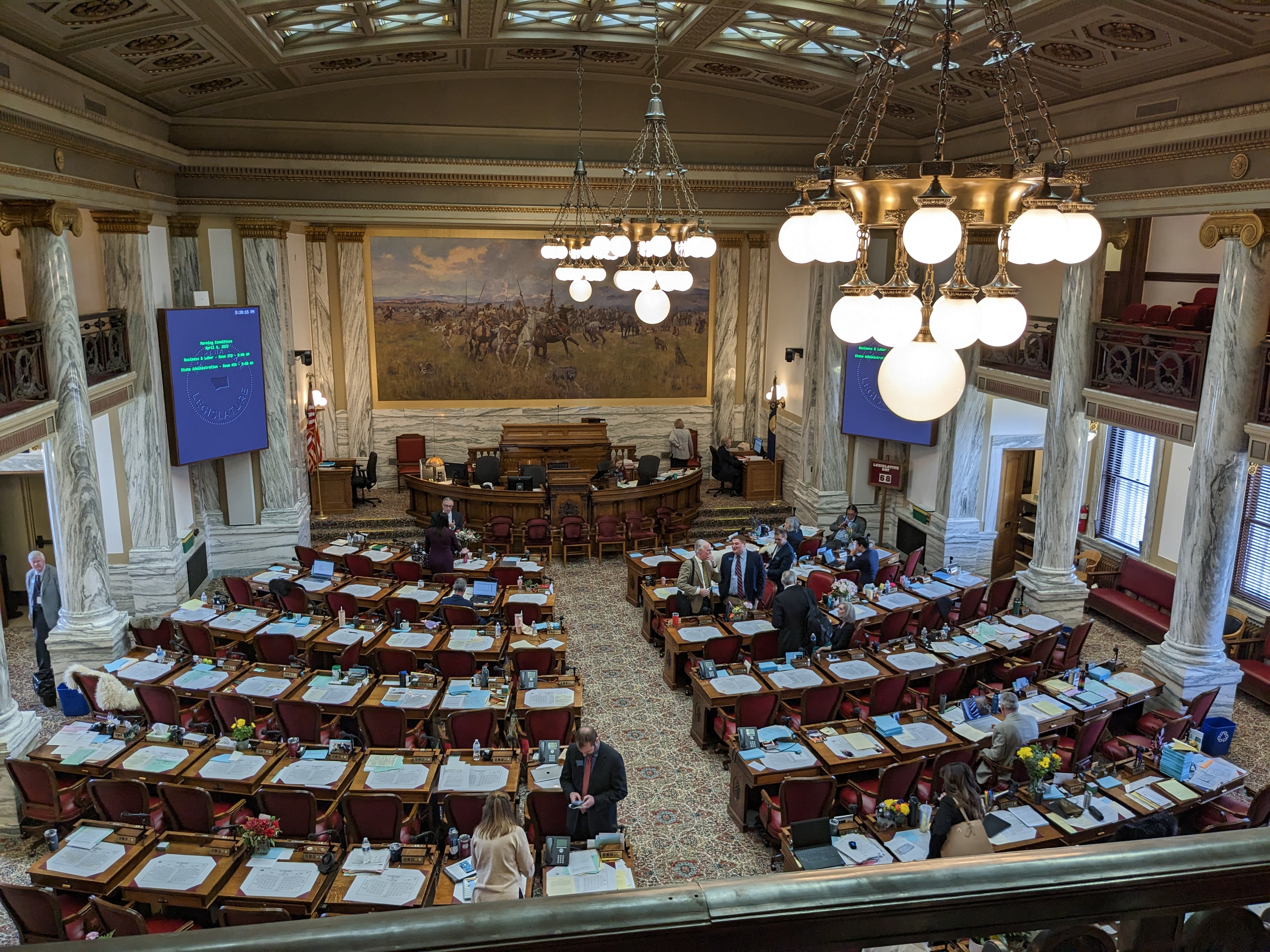
- House of Representatives Chamber; Montana State Capitol; Helena, Montana

Website
- Montana House of Representatives

The Montana House of Representatives is, with the Montana Senate, one of the two houses of the Montana Legislature. Composed of 100 members, the House elects its leadership every two years.

== Composition of the House ==
Affiliation	Party (Shading indicates majority caucus)		Total	Vacant
Affiliation	Republican	Democratic	Total	Vacant
66th Legislature (2019-2020)	58	42	100	0
67th Legislature (2021-2022)	67	33	100	0
68th Legislature (2023-2024)	68	32	100	0
69th Legislature (2025-2026)	58	42	100	0
Latest voting share	58%	42%		

In the event that the parties have a tie in number of members, the speaker and other officers are elected from the party who holds the governor's office. Thus, during the 61st legislature from 2007 to 2009, the Montana Democratic Party led the tied legislature as a result of the victory of Democratic Governor Brian Schweitzer in the 2004 election.

=== House Members ===
District	Representative	Party	Residence	First elected
1st district	Neil Duram	Republican	Libby	2018
2nd district	Tom Millett	Republican	Marion	2024
3rd district	Debo Powers	Democratic	Whitefish	2024
4th district	Lyn Bennet	Republican	Columbia Falls	2024
5th district	Braxton Mitchell	Republican	Columbia Falls	2020
6th district	Amy Regier	Republican	Kalispell	2020
7th district	Courtenay Sprunger	Republican	Kalispell	2022
8th district	Lukas Schubert	Republican	Kalispell	2024
9th district	Steven Kelly	Republican	Kalispell	2024
10th district	Terry Falk	Republican	Kalispell	2022
11th district	Ed Byrne	Republican	Bigfork	2024
12th district	Tracy Sharp	Republican	Polson	2024
13th district	Linda Reksten	Republican	Polson	2020
14th district	Paul Fielder	Republican	Thompson Falls	2020
15th district	Thedis Crowe	Democratic	Browning	2024
16th district	Tyson Running Wolf	Democratic	Browning	2018
17th district	Zachary Wirth	Republican	Wolf Creek	2024
18th district	Llew Jones	Republican	Conrad	2018
19th district	Jane Weber	Democratic	Great Falls	2024
20th district	Melissa Nikolakakos	Republican	Great Falls	2024
21st district	Edward Buttrey	Republican	Great Falls	2018
22nd district	George Nikolakakos	Republican	Great Falls	2022
23rd district	Eric Tilleman	Republican	Cascade	2024
24th district	Steve Fitzpatrick	Republican	Great Falls	2024
25th district	Steve Gist	Republican	Cascade	2020
26th district	Russ Miner	Republican	Great Falls	2022
27th district	Paul Tuss	Democratic	Havre	2022
28th district	Eric Albus	Republican	Glasgow	2024
29th district	Valerie Moore	Republican	Plentywood	2024
30th district	Morgan Thiel	Republican	Sidney	2024
31st district	Frank Smith	Democratic	Poplar	2020
32nd district	Mike Fox	Democratic	Hays	2024
33rd district	Brandon Ler	Republican	Savage	2020
34th district	Jerry Schillinger	Republican	Circle	2020
35th district	Gary Parry	Republican	Colstrip	2022
36th district	Greg Kmetz	Republican	Miles City	2022
37th district	Shane Klakken	Republican	Grass Range	2024
38th district	Greg Oblander	Republican	Billings	2022
39th district	Kerri Seekins-Crowe	Republican	Billings	2020
40th district	Mike Vinton	Republican	Billings	2024
41st district	Jade Sooktis	Democratic	Lame Deer	2024
42nd district	Sidney "Chip" Fitzpatrick	Democratic	Crow Agency	2024
43rd district	Larry Brewster	Republican	Billings	2020
44th district	Katie Zolnikov	Republican	Billings	2020
45th district	Denise Baum	Democratic	Billings	2022
46th district	Denise Joy	Democratic	Billings	2024*
47th district	James Reavis	Democratic	Billings	2024
48th district	Curtis Schomer	Republican	Billings	2024
49th district	Sherry Essmann	Republican	Billings	2022
50th district	Anthony Nicastro	Republican	Billings	2024
51st district	Jodee Etchart	Republican	Billings	2022
52nd district	Stacy Zinn	Republican	Billings	2025*
53rd district	Nelly Nicol	Republican	Billings	2022
54th district	Lee Deming	Republican	Laurel	2022
55th district	Brad Barker	Republican	Red Lodge	2022
56th district	Fiona Nave	Republican	Columbus	2020
57th district	Scott Rosenzweig	Democratic	Bozeman	2024
58th district	Jamie Isaly	Democratic	Bozeman	2024
59th district	Katie Fire Thunder	Democratic	Bozeman	2025*
60th district	Alanah Griffith	Democratic	Big Sky	2024
61st district	Becky Edwards	Democratic	Bozeman	2024
62nd district	Joshua Seckinger	Democratic	Bozeman	2024
63rd district	Peter Strand	Democratic	Bozeman	2024
64th district	Kelly Kortum	Democratic	Bozeman	2020
65th district	Brian Close	Democratic	Bozeman	2024
66th district	Eric Matthews	Democratic	Bozeman	2022
67th district	Jedediah Hinkle	Republican	Belgrade	2020
68th district	Caleb Hinkle	Republican	Belgrade	2020
69th district	Kenneth Walsh	Republican	Twin Bridges	2020
70th district	Shannon Maness	Republican	Dillon	2024
71st district	Scott DeMarois	Democratic	Anaconda	2024
72nd district	Donavon Hawk	Democratic	Butte	2020
73rd district	Jennifer Lynch	Democratic	Butte	2022
74th district	Marc Lee	Democratic	Butte	2024
75th district	Mark Reinschmidt	Republican	Whitehall	2025*
76th district	John Fitzpatrick	Republican	Anaconda	2022
77th district	Jane Gillette	Republican	Three Forks	2020
78th district	Randyn Gregg	Republican	White Sulphur Springs	2024
79th district	Luke Muszkiewicz	Democratic	Helena	2024
80th district	Melissa Romano	Democratic	Helena	2022
81st district	Mary Caferro	Democratic	Helena	2022
82nd district	Pete Elverum	Democratic	Helena	2024
83rd district	Jill Cohenour	Democratic	Helena	2022
84th district	Julie Dooling	Republican	Helena	2024
85th district	Kathy Love	Republican	Hamilton	2024
86th district	David Bedey	Republican	Hamilton	2018
87th district	Terry Nelson	Republican	Stevensville	2025*
88th district	Greg Overstreet	Republican	Stevensville	2024
89th district	Mark Thane	Democratic	Missoula	2020
90th district	Curtis Cochran	Republican	St. Regis	2024
91st district	Shelly Fyant	Democratic	Arlee	2024
92nd district	Connie Keogh	Democratic	Missoula	2018
93rd district	Katie Sullivan	Democratic	Missoula	2018
94th district	Marilyn Marler	Democratic	Missoula	2018
95th district	Zooey Zephyr	Democratic	Missoula	2022
96th district	Bob Carter	Democratic	Missoula	2022
97th district	Melody Cunningham	Democratic	Missoula	2024
98th district	Jonathan Karlen	Democratic	Missoula	2022
99th district	Tom France	Democratic	Missoula	2020
100th district	SJ Howell	Democratic	Missoula	2022

*Representative was appointed

== Committees ==
Four administrative committees were created by state law to manage the administrative functions of the legislative branch. These committees are Audit Committee, Finance Committee, Legislative Council, and Consumer Committee.

The Montana House of Representatives has 16 standing committees. These are:

- Agriculture
- Appropriations
- Business and Labor
- Education
- Ethics
- Energy, Technology, and Federal Relations
- Fish, Wildlife, and Parks
- Human Services
- Judiciary
- Legislative Administration
- Local Government
- Natural Resources
- Rules
- State Administration
- Taxation
- Transportation

In addition, Interim Committees may be appointed each legislative session.

== See also ==
- Category:Elections in Montana
- Montana Legislature
- Montana Senate
- List of Montana state legislatures
