= 2014 United States House of Representatives election in Montana =

- November 4, 2014
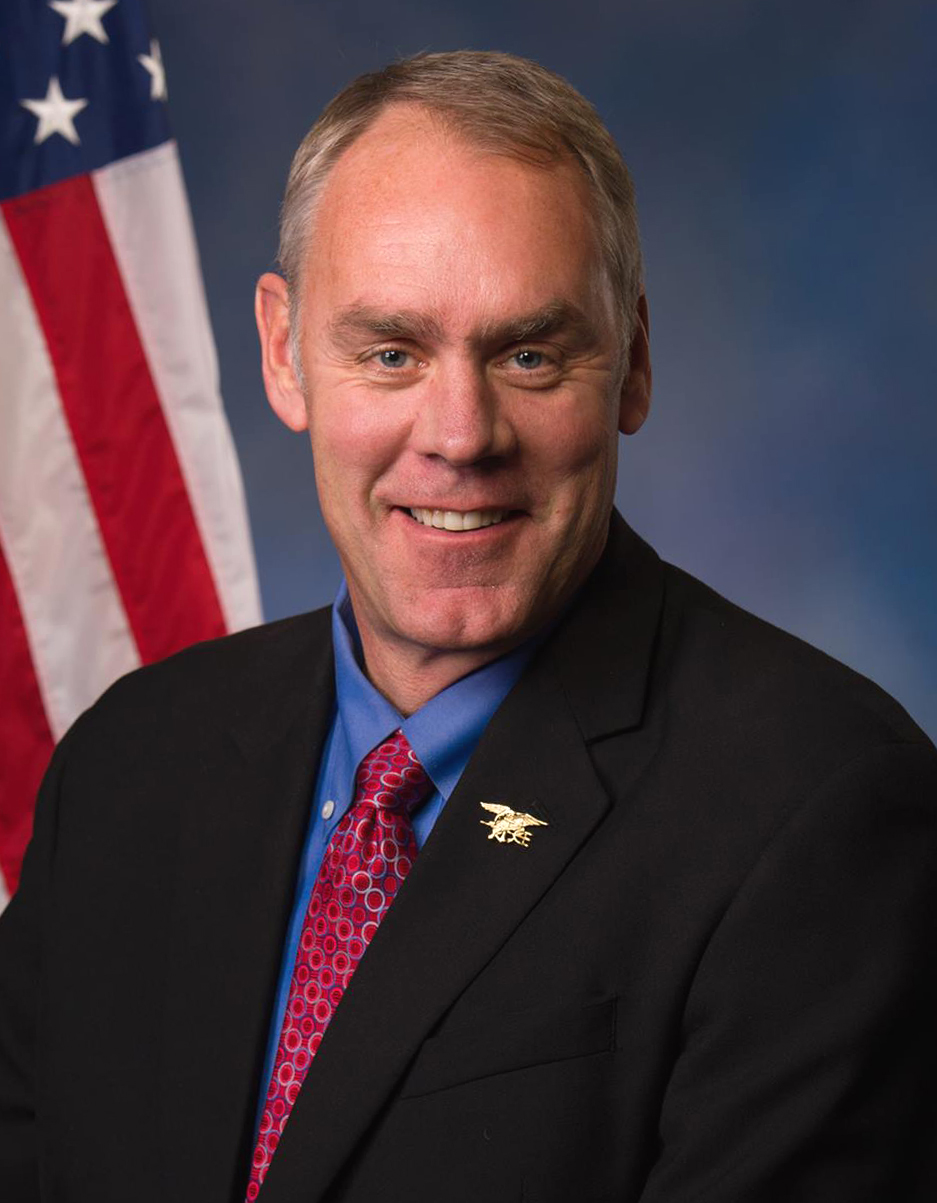

Nominee	Ryan Zinke	John Lewis
Party	Republican	Democratic
Popular vote	203,871	148,690
Percentage	55.41%	40.41%
- County results Zinke: 40–50% 50–60% 60–70% 70–80% 80–90% Lewis: 40–50% 50–60% 60–70%
U.S. Representative before election
Steve Daines
Republican
Elected U.S. Representative
Ryan Zinke
Republican

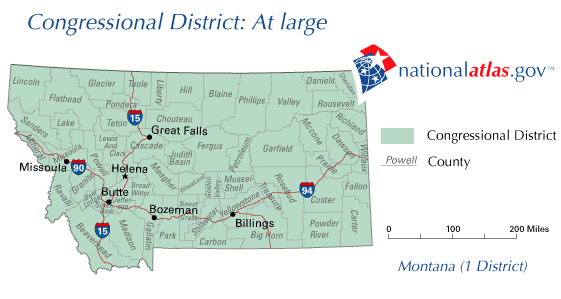
Montana's at-large congressional district

The 2014 congressional election in Montana was held on November 4, 2014, to elect the U.S. representative from Montana's at-large congressional district. Between 1993 and 2023, Montana had one at-large seat in the House.

Incumbent Republican Congressman Steve Daines was first elected in 2012. Instead of running for re-election, he successfully ran for the U.S. Senate election in 2014. Representatives are elected for two-year terms; the elected will serve in the 114th United States Congress from January 3, 2015, until January 3, 2017.

== Republican primary ==
=== Candidates ===
==== Declared ====
- Elsie Arntzen, state representative
- Matt Rosendale, state senator
- Corey Stapleton, former state senator and candidate for governor in 2012
- Drew Turiano, real estate investor and candidate for Secretary of State of Montana in 2012
- Ryan Zinke, former state senator and candidate for lieutenant governor in 2012

==== Withdrew ====
- Brad Johnson, former Secretary of State of Montana (running for Montana Public Service Commission)

==== Declined ====
- Steve Daines, incumbent U.S. Representative (running for the U.S. Senate)
- Champ Edmunds, state representative (running for the U.S. Senate)
- Denny Rehberg, former U.S. Representative, former lieutenant governor and nominee for the U.S. Senate in 1996 and 2012
- Scott Reichner, state representative
- Jon Sonju, state senator and nominee for lieutenant governor in 2012

=== Polling ===
Poll source	Date(s) administered	Sample size	Margin of error	Brad Johnson	Matthew Rosendale	Corey Stapleton	Ryan Zinke	Other	Undecided
PPP	November 15–17, 2013	469	±4.5%	20%	9%	32%	9%	—	31%

=== Primary results ===
Republican primary results
Party	Candidate	Votes	%
Republican	Ryan Zinke	43,766	33.25
Republican	Corey Stapleton	38,591	29.32
Republican	Matt Rosendale	37,965	28.84
Republican	Elsie Arntzen	9,011	6.85
Republican	Drew Turiano	2,290	1.74
Total votes		131,623	100

== Democratic primary ==
=== Candidates ===
==== Declared ====
- John Driscoll, former Public Service Commissioner, former Speaker of the Montana House of Representatives and nominee for the seat in 2008
- John Lewis, former state director for U.S. Senator Max Baucus

==== Withdrew ====
- Melinda Gopher, writer and candidate for the seat in 2010

==== Declined ====
- Pam Bucy, Montana Commissioner of Labor and Industry and nominee for Attorney General of Montana in 2012
- Shane Colton, attorney and former commissioner of the Montana Department of Fish, Wildlife and Parks
- Amanda Curtis, state representative
- John Engen, Mayor of Missoula
- Kim Gillan, state senator and nominee for the seat in 2012
- Denise Juneau, Montana Superintendent of Public Instruction
- Jesse Laslovich, former state senator, Chief Legal Counsel to Montana State Auditor Monica Lindeen and candidate for Attorney General of Montana in 2012
- Monica Lindeen, Montana State Auditor
- Kendall Van Dyk, state senator
- John Walsh, United States Senator former Lieutenant Governor of Montana and former Adjutant General of the Montana National Guard (running for the U.S. Senate)
- Carol Williams, former Majority Leader of the Montana State Senate
- John Patrick Williams, former U.S. Representative
- Whitney Williams, former director of operations for Hillary Clinton
- Franke Wilmer, state representative

=== Endorsements ===
John Lewis
- Max Baucus, former U.S. Senator (D-MT)
- Steve Bullock, Governor of Montana
- Jon Tester, U.S. Senator (D-MT)

=== Primary results ===
Democratic primary results
Party	Candidate	Votes	%
Democratic	John Lewis	42,588	59.84
Democratic	John Driscoll	28,580	40.16
Total votes		71,168	100

== Libertarian nomination ==
=== Candidates ===
==== Declared ====
- Mike Fellows, businessman and chair of the Libertarian Party of Montana

== Independents ==
=== Candidates ===
==== Withdrawn ====
- Shawn White Wolf, counselor for the Montana United Indian Association and candidate for the Montana House of Representatives in 2010

== General election ==
=== Polling ===
Poll source	Date(s) administered	Sample size	Margin of error	Ryan Zinke (R)	John Lewis (D)	Mike Fellows (L)	Undecided
Gravis Marketing	October 23–24, 2014	604	± 4%	53%	41%	—	6%
The MSU-Billings Poll	October 6–11, 2014	410	± 5%	40%	33%	2%	25%
Gravis Marketing	September 29–30, 2014	535	± 4%	51%	41%	—	8%
Vox Populi Polling	August 3–4, 2014	798	± 3.5%	44%	37%	—	19%
Gravis Marketing	July 20–22, 2014	741	± 4%	47%	35%	6%	11%
Public Policy Polling	November 15–17, 2013	952	± 3.2%	37%	32%	—	30%

Hypothetical polling

Poll source	Date(s) administered	Sample size	Margin of error	Brad Johnson (R)	John Lewis (D)	Other	Undecided
Public Policy Polling	November 15–17, 2013	952	± 3.2%	43%	32%	—	26%

Poll source	Date(s) administered	Sample size	Margin of error	Matthew Rosendale (R)	John Lewis (D)	Other	Undecided
Public Policy Polling	November 15–17, 2013	952	± 3.2%	37%	32%	—	31%

Poll source	Date(s) administered	Sample size	Margin of error	Corey Stapleton (R)	John Lewis (D)	Other	Undecided
Public Policy Polling	November 15–17, 2013	952	± 3.2%	44%	31%	—	25%

==== Predictions ====
Source	Ranking	As of
The Cook Political Report	Likely R	November 3, 2014
Rothenberg	Safe R	October 24, 2014
Sabato's Crystal Ball	Likely R	October 30, 2014
RCP	Likely R	November 2, 2014
Daily Kos Elections	Safe R	November 4, 2014

=== Results ===
Montana's at-large congressional district, 2014
Party	Candidate	Votes	%	±%
Republican	Ryan Zinke	203,871	55.41%	+2.16%
Democratic	John Lewis	148,690	40.41%	−2.13%
Libertarian	Mike Fellows	15,402	4.18%	+0.15%
Total votes		367,963	100.00%	N/A
Republican hold				

==== Counties that flipped from Democratic to Republican ====
- Hill (largest city: Havre)

== See also ==
- United States Senate election in Montana, 2014
- 2014 United States House of Representatives elections
- 2014 United States elections
