= Montana's at-large congressional district =

At-large U.S. House district for Montana

- Obsolete district
- Created: 1889; 1990
- Eliminated: 1918; 2020
- Years active: 1889–1919; 1993–2023

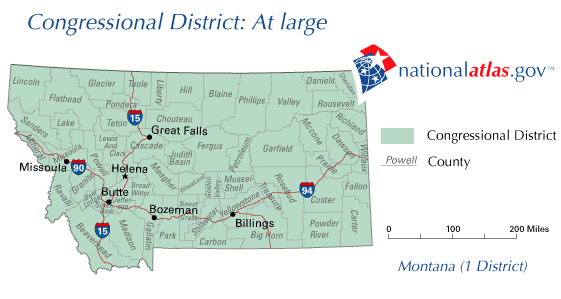
The district from 1993 to 2023

From 1889 to 1918 and again from 1993 to 2023, Montana was represented in the United States House of Representatives by one at-large congressional district in the United States Congress. The district was the most populous U.S. congressional district at the time, with just over 1 million constituents, and the second-largest by land area, after Alaska's at-large congressional district.

The district was last represented by Republican Matt Rosendale. It had previously been represented by Republican Greg Gianforte, who did not seek re-election in 2020. Instead, he opted to run for Governor of Montana.

Starting in the 2022 midterm elections, per the 2020 United States census, Montana regained the congressional seat that it lost after the 1990 census. Thus, the current at-large statewide district was dissolved, and the new districts were the 1st district in the west and the 2nd district in the east, restoring a configuration that had existed from 1919 to 1993. Rosendale sought re-election in the 2nd district and was elected.

== Politics ==
President George W. Bush won Montana in the 2004 presidential election with 59.1% of the vote, beating John Kerry by 20 percentage points, which indicates that the district leans Republican. However, four years later John McCain won the state by only 2.5% over Barack Obama, and there is a significant Democratic presence in the state: as late as 2025, one U.S. Senate seat was held by a Democrat, which suggested at the time that the district could be competitive in future elections. In 2016, Donald Trump won by over 20%, while Ryan Zinke won Montana's single congressional seat by over 16%. Incumbent Democratic Governor Steve Bullock, however, was also reelected by 4%. The seat was left vacant when Zinke was appointed Secretary of the Interior. In a special election held on May 25, 2017, Republican Greg Gianforte won with a margin of 6% and would be reelected by a margin of 5% in 2018.

== Early at-large district ==
From statehood in 1889, until the creation of geographic districts in 1919, Montana was represented in the United States House of Representatives by members elected at-large, that is, requiring voting by all the state population. From 1913 to 1919, there were two seats, still elected at-large; the top two finishers were awarded the seats. After that time, two representatives were elected from two geographic districts of roughly equal population, from the east and the west of the state.

In the reapportionment following the 1990 census, Montana lost one of its two seats. Its remaining member was again elected at-large.

== List of members representing the district ==
=== 1889–1919: one, then two seats ===
Years	Cong ress	Seat A			Seat B		
Years	Cong ress	Member	Party	Electoral history	Member	Party	Electoral history
March 4, 1889 – November 8, 1889	51st	Seat created upon statehood			A second seat was added in 1913.		
November 8, 1889 – March 3, 1891	51st	Thomas H. Carter (Helena)	Republican	Elected in 1889. Lost re-election.	A second seat was added in 1913.		
March 4, 1891 – March 3, 1893	52nd	William W. Dixon (Butte)	Democratic	Elected in 1890. Lost re-election.	A second seat was added in 1913.		
March 4, 1893 – March 3, 1897	53rd 54th 55th	Charles S. Hartman (Bozeman)	Republican	Elected in 1892. Re-elected in 1894. Re-elected in 1896. Retired.	A second seat was added in 1913.		
March 4, 1897 – March 3, 1899	53rd 54th 55th	Charles S. Hartman (Bozeman)	Silver; Republican	Elected in 1892. Re-elected in 1894. Re-elected in 1896. Retired.	A second seat was added in 1913.		
March 4, 1899 – March 3, 1901	56th	Albert J. Campbell (Butte)	Democratic	Elected in 1898. Retired.	A second seat was added in 1913.		
March 4, 1901 – March 3, 1903	57th	Caldwell Edwards (Bozeman)	Populist	Elected in 1900. Retired.	A second seat was added in 1913.		
March 4, 1903 – March 3, 1907	58th 59th	Joseph M. Dixon (Missoula)	Republican	Elected in 1902. Re-elected in 1904. Retired to run for U.S. senator.	A second seat was added in 1913.		
March 4, 1907 – March 3, 1913	60th 61st 62nd	Charles N. Pray (Fort Benton)	Republican	Elected in 1906. Re-elected in 1908. Re-elected in 1910. Lost re-election.	A second seat was added in 1913.		
March 4, 1913 – March 3, 1917	63rd 64th	John M. Evans (Missoula)	Democratic	Elected in 1912. Re-elected in 1914. Re-elected in 1916. Redistricted to the 1st district.	Tom Stout (Lewistown)	Democratic	Elected in 1912. Re-elected in 1914. Retired.
March 4, 1917 – March 3, 1919	65th	John M. Evans (Missoula)	Democratic	Elected in 1912. Re-elected in 1914. Re-elected in 1916. Redistricted to the 1st district.	Jeannette Rankin(Missoula)	Republican	Elected in 1916. Redistricted to the 1st district and retired to run for U.S. senator.

The two at-large seats were moved to district representation in 1919, and remained until 1993, when Montana lost a seat due to redistricting from the 1990 U.S. census, re-establishing the single seat at-large district.

=== 1993–2023: one seat ===
Member	Party	Years	Cong ress	Electoral history
District re-established January 3, 1993
Pat Williams (Helena)	Democratic	January 3, 1993 – January 3, 1997	103rd 104th	Redistricted from the 1st district and re-elected in 1992. Re-elected in 1994. Retired.
Rick Hill (Helena)	Republican	January 3, 1997 – January 3, 2001	105th 106th	Elected in 1996. Re-elected in 1998. Retired.
Denny Rehberg (Billings)	Republican	January 3, 2001 – January 3, 2013	107th 108th 109th 110th 111th 112th	Elected in 2000. Re-elected in 2002. Re-elected in 2004. Re-elected in 2006. Re-elected in 2008. Re-elected in 2010. Retired to run for U.S. senator.
Steve Daines (Bozeman)	Republican	January 3, 2013 – January 3, 2015	113th	Elected in 2012. Retired to run for the U.S. senator.
Ryan Zinke (Whitefish)	Republican	January 3, 2015 – March 1, 2017	114th 115th	Elected in 2014. Re-elected in 2016. Resigned to become U.S. Secretary of the Interior.
Vacant		March 1, 2017 – June 21, 2017	115th	
Greg Gianforte (Bozeman)	Republican	June 21, 2017 – January 3, 2021	115th 116th	Elected to finish Zinke's term. Re-elected in 2018. Retired to run for Governor of Montana.
Matt Rosendale (Glendive)	Republican	January 3, 2021 – January 3, 2023	117th	Elected in 2020. Redistricted to the 2nd district.
District eliminated January 3, 2023

== Recent election results ==
The following are official results from the general elections.

1998 United States House of Representatives election in Montana
Party	Candidate	Votes	%
Republican	Rick Hill (incumbent)	175,748	53.01
Democratic	Dusty Deschamps	147,073	44.36
Libertarian	Mike Fellows	5,652	1.70
Reform	Webb Sullivan	3,078	0.93
Majority		28,675	8.65
Turnout		338,733	52.99
Republican hold			

2000 United States House of Representatives election in Montana
Party	Candidate	Votes	%	±%
Republican	Denny Rehberg	211,418	51.50	−1.51%
Democratic	Nancy Keenan	189,971	46.28	+1.92%
Libertarian	James Tikalsky	9,132	2.22	+0.52%
Majority		21,447	5.22	−3.43%
Turnout		417,916	59.85	+6.86%
Republican hold		Swing		

2002 United States House of Representatives election in Montana
Party	Candidate	Votes	%	±%
Republican	Denny Rehberg (incumbent)	214,100	64.62	+13.12%
Democratic	Steve Kelly	108,233	32.67	−13.61%
Libertarian	Mike Fellows	8,988	2.71	+0.49%
Majority		105,867	31.95	+26.73%
Turnout		340,272	54.48	−5.37%
Republican hold		Swing		

2004 United States House of Representatives election in Montana
Party	Candidate	Votes	%	±%
Republican	Denny Rehberg (incumbent)	286,076	64.40	−0.22%
Democratic	Tracy Velazquez	145,606	32.78	+0.11%
Libertarian	Mike Fellows	12,548	2.82	+0.11%
Majority		140,470	31.62	−0.33%
Turnout		456,096	71.44	+16.96%
Republican hold		Swing		

2006 United States House of Representatives election in Montana
Party	Candidate	Votes	%	±%
Republican	Denny Rehberg (incumbent)	239,124	58.88	−5.52%
Democratic	Monica Lindeen	158,916	39.13	+6.35%
Libertarian	Mike Fellows	8,085	1.99	−0.83%
Majority		80,208	19.75	−11.87%
Turnout		411,061	63.30	−8.14%
Republican hold		Swing		

2008 United States House of Representatives election in Montana
Party	Candidate	Votes	%	±%
Republican	Denny Rehberg (incumbent)	308,470	64.14	+5.26%
Democratic	John Driscoll	155,930	32.42	−6.71%
Libertarian	Mike Fellows	16,500	3.43	+1.44%
Majority		152,540	31.72	+11.97%
Turnout		497,599	74.48	+11.18%
Republican hold		Swing		

2010 United States House of Representatives election in Montana
Party	Candidate	Votes	%	±%
Republican	Denny Rehberg (incumbent)	217,696	60.41	−3.73%
Democratic	Dennis McDonald	121,954	33.84	+1.42%
Libertarian	Mike Fellows	20,691	5.74	+2.31%
Majority		95,742	26.57	−5.15%
Turnout		367,096	56.36	−18.12%
Republican hold		Swing		

2012 United States House of Representatives election in Montana
Party	Candidate	Votes	%	±%
Republican	Steve Daines	255,468	53.25	−7.16%
Democratic	Kim Gillan	204,939	42.72	+8.88%
Libertarian	David Kaiser	19,333	4.03	−1.71%
Majority		50,529	10.53	−16.04%
Turnout		491,966	72.18	+15.82%
Republican hold		Swing		

2014 United States House of Representatives election in Montana
Party	Candidate	Votes	%	±%
Republican	Ryan Zinke	201,436	55.47	+2.22%
Democratic	John Lewis	146,474	40.34	−2.38%
Libertarian	Mike Fellows	15,105	4.16	+0.13%
Majority		54,962	15.13	+4.6%
Turnout		369,047	54.73	−17.45%
Republican hold		Swing		

2016 United States House of Representatives election in Montana
Party	Candidate	Votes	%	±%
Republican	Ryan Zinke (incumbent)	285,358	56.19	+0.78%
Democratic	Denise Juneau	205,919	40.55	+0.14%
Libertarian	Rick Breckenridge	16,554	3.26	−0.92%
Majority		79,439	15.64	−0.09%
Turnout		507,831	74.44	+19.71%
Republican hold		Swing		

2017 Montana's at-large congressional district special election: Montana's at-large District
Party	Candidate	Votes	%	±%
Republican	Greg Gianforte	189,473	50.19	−6.00%
Democratic	Rob Quist	166,483	44.11	+3.46%
Libertarian	Mark L Wicks	21,509	5.70	+2.44%
Majority		22,990	6.10	−7.54%
Turnout		377,465	54.22	−20.22%
Republican hold		Swing		

2018 United States House of Representatives election in Montana
Party	Candidate	Votes	%	±%
Republican	Greg Gianforte (incumbent)	256,661	50.88	+0.93%
Democratic	Kathleen Williams	233,284	46.25	+1.88%
Libertarian	Elinor Swanson	14,476	2.87	−2.81%
Majority		23,377	4.63	−1.47%
Turnout		504,421	71.43	+17.21%
Republican hold		Swing		

2020 United States House of Representatives election in Montana
Party	Candidate	Votes	%	±%
Republican	Matt Rosendale	339,169	56.39%	+5.51%
Democratic	Kathleen Williams	262,340	43.61%	−2.64%
Majority		76,829	12.78%	+8.15%
Turnout		601,509	79.93%	+8.50%
Republican hold		Swing		
