= 2020 United States House of Representatives election in Montana =

- November 3, 2020
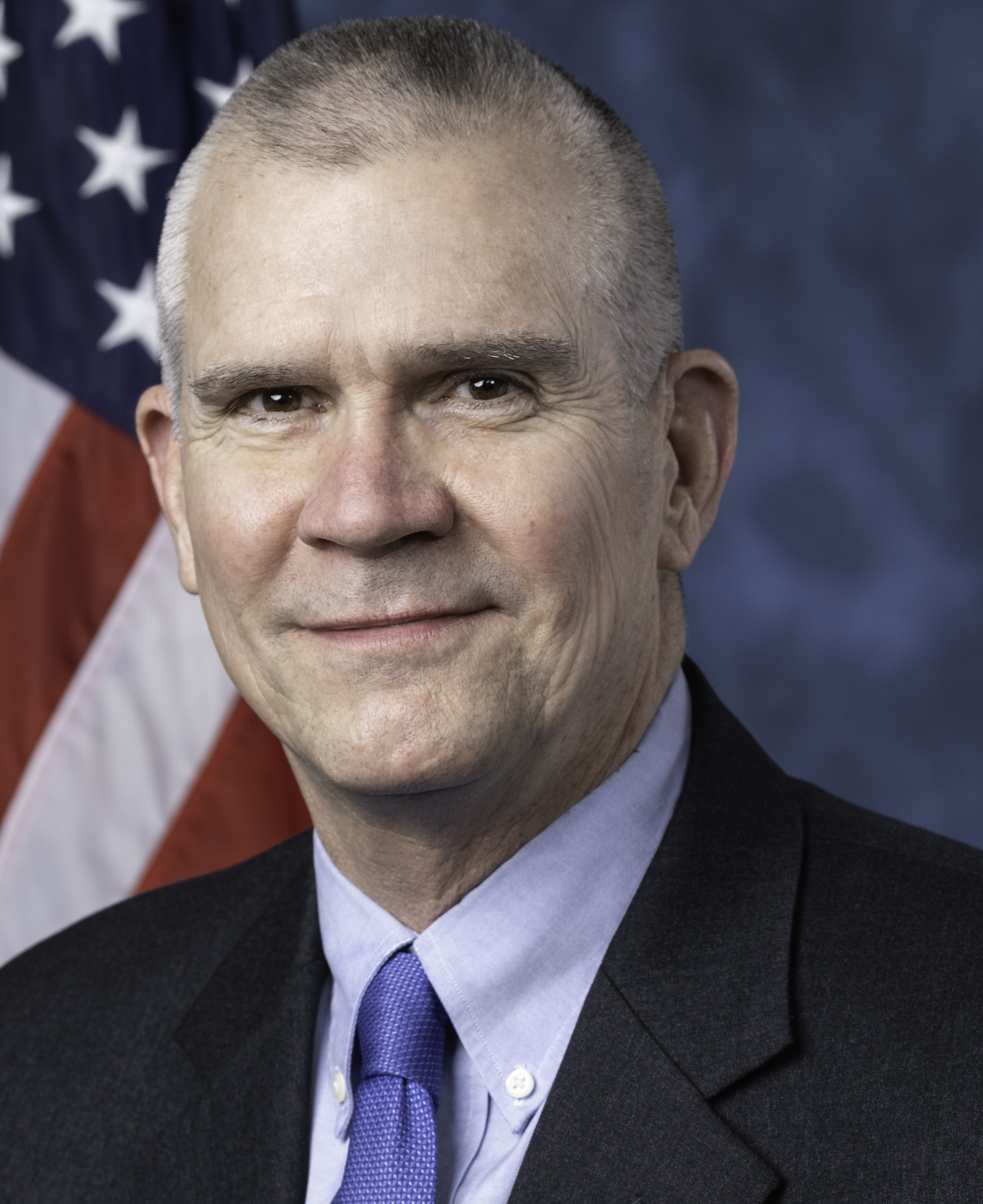

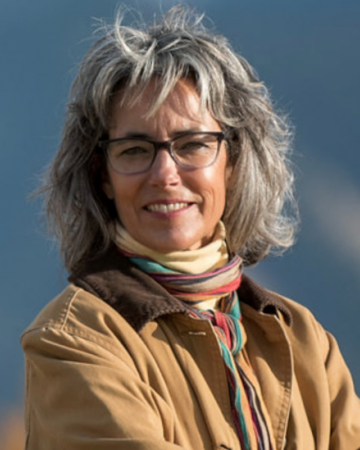
Nominee	Matt Rosendale	Kathleen Williams
Party	Republican	Democratic
Popular vote	339,169	262,340
Percentage	56.39%	43.61%
- Rosendale: 50–60% 60–70% 70–80% 80–90% >90% Williams: 50–60% 60–70% 70–80% 80–90% >90% Tie: 50% No data
U.S. Representative before election
Greg Gianforte
Republican
Elected U.S. Representative
Matt Rosendale
Republican

The 2020 United States House of Representatives election in Montana was held on November 3, 2020, to elect the U.S. representative from Montana's at-large congressional district. The election coincided with the 2020 U.S. presidential election, as well as other elections to the House of Representatives, elections to the United States Senate, and various state and local elections.

The incumbent, Republican Greg Gianforte, who was reelected with 50.9% of the vote in 2018, declined to run for reelection and instead ran successfully for Governor of Montana, after having lost the 2016 election to incumbent Democrat Steve Bullock.

As the Green Party was removed from the ballot, this was the first time since 1988 that there were no non-Republican or Democratic candidates running for either United States House of Representatives or United States Senate in Montana.

In the general election, Republican State Auditor Matt Rosendale defeated former state representative Kathleen Williams.

As of a result of the 2020 redistricting cycle, Montana regained its 2nd congressional district that it lost in 1993, therefore making the 2020 election the last election for the at-large district before it was eliminated.

== Republican primary ==
=== Candidates ===
==== Nominee ====
- Matt Rosendale, Montana state auditor, nominee for the U.S. Senate in 2018, candidate for Montana's at-large congressional district in 2014

==== Eliminated in primary ====
- Joe Dooling, rancher and chair of the Lewis and Clark County Republican Party
- John Evankovich, electrical contractor
- Debra Lamm, former chair of the Montana Republican Party and former state representative
- Mark McGinley, youth counselor and retired Montana National Guard veteran
- Corey Stapleton, secretary of state of Montana, former state senator, candidate for governor of Montana in 2012, candidate for the U.S. House in 2014

==== Declined ====
- Greg Gianforte, incumbent U.S. representative (running for governor)
- Albert Olszewski, state senator (running for governor)
- Denny Rehberg, former U.S. representative, nominee for U.S. Senate in 1996 and 2012, and former lieutenant governor of Montana

==== Endorsements ====
Matt Rosendale

Executive officials

- Donald Trump, 45th president of the United States

Individuals

- Mark Levin, conservative talk radio host
- Donald Trump Jr., businessman, son of President Donald Trump

Organizations

- Club for Growth
- Crow Tribe of Montana

=== Polling ===
Polls with a sample size of <100 have their sample size entries marked in red to indicate a lack of reliability.

Poll source	Date(s) administered	Sample size (Note: Key: A – all adults RV – registered voters LV – likely voters V – unclear)	Margin of error	Russell Fagg	Joe Dooling	Timothy Johnson	Al Olszewski	Denny Rehberg	Matt Rosendale	Corey Stapleton	Undecided
Montana State University Billings	October 7–16, 2019	99 (LV)	–	–	1%	<1%	–	–	32%	22%	44%
WPA Intelligence (R) (Note: Poll sponsored by Club for Growth Action)	February 24–26, 2019	501 (V)	± 4.4%	24%	–	–	–	–	57%	–	15%
WPA Intelligence (R)	February 24–26, 2019	501 (V)	± 4.4%	–	–	–	–	39%	46%	–	13%
WPA Intelligence (R)	February 24–26, 2019	501 (V)	± 4.4%	18%	–	–	10%	–	51%	–	18%
WPA Intelligence (R)	February 24–26, 2019	501 (V)	± 4.4%	15%	–	–	–	31%	37%	–	16%
WPA Intelligence (R)	February 24–26, 2019	501 (V)	± 4.4%	17%	–	–	–	–	48%	19%	16%

=== Results ===
Republican primary results
Party	Candidate	Votes	%
Republican	Matt Rosendale	104,575	48.31%
Republican	Corey Stapleton	71,902	33.21%
Republican	Debra Lamm	14,462	6.68%
Republican	Joe Dooling	13,726	6.34%
Republican	Mark McGinley	7,818	3.61%
Republican	John Evankovich	3,983	1.84%
Total votes		216,466	100.0%

== Democratic primary ==
=== Candidates ===
==== Nominee ====
- Kathleen Williams, former state representative and nominee for Montana's at-large congressional district in 2018

==== Eliminated in primary ====
- Tom Winter, state representative

==== Withdrew ====
- Matt Rains, rancher and army veteran (endorsed Williams)

==== Declined ====
- Wilmot Collins, mayor of Helena and former 2020 candidate for U.S. Senate
- Rob Quist, musician, member of the Montana Arts Council, nominee for Montana's at-large congressional district in 2017

==== Endorsements ====
Kathleen Williams

State politicians

- Dick Barrett, state representative
- Willis Curdy, state representative
- Ann Mary Dussault, former state representative and former House Majority Leader
- Jen Gross, state senator
- Tom Jacobson, state senator
- Jessica Karjala, state representative
- Kathy Kelker, state representative
- Emma Kerr-Carpenter, state representative
- Jasmine Krotkov, state representative
- Margaret McDonald, state senator, Senate minority whip, and former state representative
- Mary McNally, state senator
- Diane Sands, state senator and former state representative

Local politicians

- Mike Kadas, former mayor of Missoula (1996–2006)

Individuals

- Matt Rains, rancher, Army veteran, former 2020 candidate for U.S. House of Representatives from Montana's at-large district

Local unions

- American Federation of State, County and Municipal Employees Montana Council 9
- International Brotherhood of Teamsters Local 190
- Montana Federation of Public Employees

Organizations

- EMILY's List
- End Citizens United
- League of Conservation Voters
- Montana Conservation Voters
- Montana Sportsmen Alliance PAC
- National Committee to Preserve Social Security and Medicare
- National Organization for Women
- New Democrat Coalition Action Fund
Tom Winter

Individuals

- Marianne Williamson, former 2020 Democratic presidential candidate

Organizations

- Blue America
- DUH! Demand Universal Healthcare
- Montana Progressive Democrats
- Our Revolution
- Progressive Rising
- Sunrise Movement - Montana chapter

=== Polling ===
Polls with a sample size of <100 have their sample size entries marked in red to indicate a lack of reliability.

Poll source	Date(s) administered	Sample size	Margin of error	Matt Rains	Kathleen Williams	Undecided
Montana State University Billings	October 7–16, 2019	40 (LV)	–	6%	69%	25%

=== Results ===
Democratic primary results
Party	Candidate	Votes	%
Democratic	Kathleen Williams	133,436	89.47%
Democratic	Tom Winter	15,698	10.53%
Total votes		149,134	100.0%

== Other candidates ==
=== Green Party ===
==== Disqualified ====
- John Gibney, anti-immigration activist

==== Results ====
Green primary results
Party	Candidate	Votes	%
Green	John Gibney	690	100.0%
Total votes		690	100.0%

== General election ==
=== Predictions ===
Source	Ranking	As of
The Cook Political Report	Lean R	October 2, 2020
Inside Elections	Lean R	October 1, 2020
Sabato's Crystal Ball	Lean R	October 1, 2020
Politico	Lean R	September 9, 2020
Daily Kos	Lean R	September 25, 2020
RCP	Tossup	October 26, 2020
Niskanen	Lean R	July 26, 2020
The Economist	Tossup	October 2, 2020

=== Polling ===
View source data.

Poll source	Date(s) administered	Sample size	Margin of error	Matt Rosendale (R)	Kathleen Williams (D)	Other / Undecided
Montana State University Billings	October 19–24, 2020	546 (LV)	± 4.2%	47%	46%	6% (Note: Undecided with 6%)
Siena College/NYT Upshot	October 18–20, 2020	758 (LV)	± 4.4%	50%	46%	4% (Note: Would not vote with 1%; "Someone else" with 0%; Undecided with 3%)
Strategies 360	October 15–20, 2020	500 (LV)	± 4.4%	46%	46%	9% (Note: Undecided with 9%)
RMG Research/PoliticalIQ	October 15–18, 2020	800 (LV)	± 3.5%	47% (Note: Standard VI response)	47%	6% (Note: "Someone else" with 2%; Undecided with 4%)
RMG Research/PoliticalIQ	October 15–18, 2020	800 (LV)	± 3.5%	45% (Note: Results generated with high Democratic turnout model)	49%	6% (Note: "Someone else" with 2%; Undecided with 4%)
RMG Research/PoliticalIQ	October 15–18, 2020	800 (LV)	± 3.5%	49% (Note: Results generated with high Republican turnout model)	45%	6% (Note: "Someone else" with 2%; Undecided with 4%)
Montana State University Bozeman	September 14 – October 2, 2020	1,609 (LV)	± 3.9%	48%	46%	6% (Note: "Other" with 1%; Undecided with 5%)
Siena College/NYT Upshot	September 14–16, 2020	625 (LV)	± 4.8%	41%	44%	13% (Note: Gibney (G) with 2%; would not vote with 1%; "someone else" with 0%; "Undecided/Refused" with 10%)
Expedition Strategies (D) (Note: Poll conducted for The House Majority PAC, which endorsed Williams prior to this poll's sampling period.)	August 22–27, 2020	400 (LV)	± 4.9%	48%	51%	1% (Note: Undecided with 1%)
WPA Intelligence (R)	August 9–11, 2020	500 (LV)	± 4.4%	51%	45%	4% (Note: Undecided with 4%)
Civiqs/Daily Kos	July 11–13, 2020	873 (RV)	± 4.2%	49%	47%	5% (Note: Undecided with 3%; "Someone else" with 2%)
Public Policy Polling	July 9–10, 2020	1,224 (V)	± 2.8%	44%	44%	13% (Note: Undecided with 13%)
Global Strategy Group (D) (Note: Poll sponsored by Kathleen Williams' campaign)	June 24–28, 2020	500 (LV)	± 4.4%	47%	47%	6%
University of Montana	June 17–26, 2020	517 (RV)	± 4.3%	45%	37%	18% (Note: Undecided with 18.4%)
Public Policy Polling (Note: Poll sponsored by End Citizens United, which has exclusively endorsed Democratic candidates)	March 12–13, 2020	903 (V)	± 3.3%	45%	45%	9%

Hypothetical polling

University of Montana polls did not account for certain presumed withdrawals of major party candidates after their primaries in the following polls.

with Joe Dooling (R), John Evankovich (R), Timothy Johnson (R), Corey Stapleton (R) and Tom Winter (D)

Poll source	Date(s) administered	Sample size	Margin of error	Matt Rosendale (R)	Corey Stapleton (R)	Kathleen Williams (D)	Other
University of Montana	February 12–22, 2020	498 (LV)	± 4.4%	35.7%	19.4%	35.8%	9.1% (Note: Dooling (R) with 2.9%; Winter (D) with 2.7%; Johnson (R) with 1.8%; Evankovich (R) with 1.7%)

with Joe Dooling (R), Timothy Johnson (R), Matt Rains (D), Corey Stapleton (R) and Tom Winter (D)

Poll source	Date(s) administered	Sample size	Margin of error	Matt Rosendale (R)	Corey Stapleton (R)	Kathleen Williams (D)	Other
University of Montana	September 26 – October 3, 2019	303 (RV)	± 5.6%	35.3%	19.8%	36.1%	8.8% (Note: Dooling (R) with 2.5%; Rains (D) with 2.4%; Winter (D) with 2.1%; Johnson (R) with 1.8%)

=== Results ===
2020 Montana's at-large congressional district election
Party	Candidate	Votes	%	±%
Republican	Matt Rosendale	339,169	56.39%	+5.51%
Democratic	Kathleen Williams	262,340	43.61%	−2.64%
Total votes		601,509	100.00%	
Republican hold				

==== By county ====
County	Matt Rosendale Republican		Kathleen Williams Democratic		Margin		Total
County	Votes	%	Votes	%	Votes	%	Total
Beaverhead	3,811	67.71%	1,817	32.29%	1,994	35.43%	5,628
Big Horn	2,103	43.96%	2,681	56.04%	-578	-12.08%	4,784
Blaine	1,391	44.90%	1,707	55.10%	-316	-10.20%	3,098
Broadwater	3,150	77.11%	935	22.89%	2,215	54.22%	4,085
Carbon	4,465	63.29%	2,590	36.71%	1,875	26.58%	7,055
Carter	758	88.76%	96	11.24%	662	77.52%	854
Cascade	22,724	57.14%	17,043	42.86%	5,681	14.29%	39,767
Chouteau	1,820	61.49%	1,140	38.51%	680	22.97%	2,960
Custer	4,072	69.67%	1,773	30.33%	2,299	39.33%	5,845
Daniels	786	77.44%	229	22.56%	557	54.88%	1,015
Dawson	3,639	75.81%	1,161	24.19%	2,478	51.63%	4,800
Deer Lodge	2,036	41.83%	2,831	58.17%	-795	-16.33%	4,867
Fallon	1,312	83.94%	251	16.06%	1,061	67.88%	1,563
Fergus	4,715	72.90%	1,753	27.10%	2,962	45.79%	6,468
Flathead	38,426	64.37%	21,271	35.63%	17,155	28.74%	59,697
Gallatin	32,217	45.56%	38,501	54.44%	-6,284	-8.89%	70,718
Garfield	738	92.13%	63	7.87%	675	84.27%	801
Glacier	1,783	31.46%	3,885	68.54%	-2,102	-37.09%	5,668
Golden Valley	412	89.76%	47	10.24%	365	79.52%	459
Granite	1,388	66.48%	700	33.52%	688	32.95%	2,088
Hill	3,807	53.11%	3,361	46.89%	446	6.22%	7,168
Jefferson	5,288	65.10%	2,835	34.90%	2,453	30.20%	8,123
Judith Basin	998	74.26%	346	25.74%	652	48.51%	1,344
Lake	9,239	56.03%	7,250	43.97%	1,989	12.06%	16,489
Lewis and Clark	21,045	49.99%	21,050	50.01%	-5	-0.01%	42,095
Liberty	776	71.85%	304	28.15%	472	43.70%	1,080
Lincoln	8,587	73.40%	3,112	26.60%	5,475	46.80%	11,699
Madison	4,113	67.92%	1,943	32.08%	2,170	35.83%	6,056
McCone	932	83.29%	187	16.71%	745	66.58%	1,119
Meagher	834	75.34%	273	24.66%	561	50.68%	1,107
Mineral	1,647	70.81%	679	29.19%	968	41.62%	2,326
Missoula	26,662	37.34%	44,749	62.66%	-18,087	-25.33%	71,411
Musselshell	2,341	81.85%	519	18.15%	1,822	63.71%	2,860
Park	5,933	51.52%	5,582	48.48%	351	3.05%	11,515
Petroleum	298	85.39%	51	14.61%	247	70.77%	349
Phillips	1,860	79.18%	489	20.82%	1,371	58.37%	2,349
Pondera	1,963	65.83%	1,019	34.17%	944	31.66%	2,982
Powder River	953	83.74%	185	16.26%	768	67.49%	1,138
Powell	2,278	71.70%	899	28.30%	1,379	43.41%	3,177
Prairie	568	79.33%	148	20.67%	420	58.66%	716
Ravalli	19,114	67.15%	9,350	32.85%	9,764	34.30%	28,464
Richland	4,694	81.66%	1,054	18.34%	3,640	63.33%	5,748
Roosevelt	1,927	48.33%	2,060	51.67%	-133	-3.34%	3,987
Rosebud	2,426	64.68%	1,325	35.32%	1,101	29.35%	3,751
Sanders	5,574	73.51%	2,009	26.49%	3,565	47.01%	7,583
Sheridan	1,328	66.10%	681	33.90%	647	32.21%	2,009
Silver Bow	7,175	38.40%	11,511	61.60%	-4,336	-23.20%	18,686
Stillwater	4,366	76.48%	1,343	23.52%	3,023	52.95%	5,709
Sweet Grass	1,843	75.26%	606	24.74%	1,237	50.51%	2,449
Teton	2,557	69.41%	1,127	30.59%	1,430	38.82%	3,684
Toole	1,546	73.72%	551	26.28%	995	47.45%	2,097
Treasure	356	77.39%	104	22.61%	252	54.78%	460
Valley	2,966	70.65%	1,232	29.35%	1,734	41.31%	4,198
Wheatland	792	74.51%	271	25.49%	521	49.01%	1,063
Wibaux	492	83.39%	98	16.61%	394	66.78%	590
Yellowstone	50,145	59.90%	33,563	40.10%	16,582	19.81%	83,708
Totals	339,169	56.39%	262,340	43.61%	76,829	12.77%	601,509

Counties that flipped from Democratic to Republican

- Park (largest city: Livingston)
- Hill (largest city: Havre)

== Notes ==
Partisan clients
