= 2006 United States House of Representatives election in Montana =

- November 7, 2006
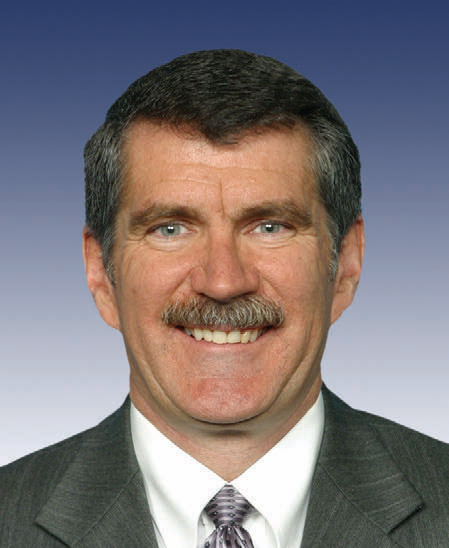

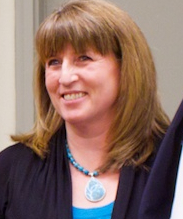
Nominee	Denny Rehberg	Monica Lindeen
Party	Republican	Democratic
Popular vote	239,124	158,916
Percentage	58.88%	39.13%
- County results Rehberg: 50–60% 60–70% 70–80% 80–90% Lindeen: 50–60%
U.S. Representative before election
Denny Rehberg
Republican
Elected U.S. Representative
Denny Rehberg
Republican

The 2006 United States House of Representatives election in Montana was held on November 7, 2006 to determine who would represent the state of Montana in the United States House of Representatives. Montana had one, at-large district in the House, apportioned according to the 2000 United States census, due to its low population. Representatives are elected for two-year terms.

== Democratic primary ==
=== Candidates ===
- Eric Jon Gunderson
- Monica Lindeen, Montana state representative

=== Results ===
Democratic Party primary results
Party	Candidate	Votes	%
Democratic	Monica Lindeen	66,364	71.09
Democratic	Eric Jon Gunderson	26,990	28.91
Total votes		93,354	100.00

== Republican primary ==
=== Candidates ===
- Denny Rehberg, incumbent U.S. congressman

=== Results ===
Republican Party primary results
Party	Candidate	Votes	%
Republican	Denny Rehberg (incumbent)	91,836	100.00
Total votes		91,836	100.00

== General election ==
=== Predictions ===
Source	Ranking	As of
The Cook Political Report	Safe R	November 6, 2006
Rothenberg	Safe R	November 6, 2006
Sabato's Crystal Ball	Safe R	November 6, 2006
Real Clear Politics	Safe R	November 7, 2006
CQ Politics	Safe R	November 7, 2006

=== Results ===
Montana's at-large congressional district election, 2006
Party	Candidate	Votes	%
Republican	Denny Rehberg (incumbent)	239,124	58.88
Democratic	Monica Lindeen	158,916	39.13
Libertarian	Mike Fellows	8,085	1.99
Total votes		406,125	100.00
Republican hold			

==== Counties that flipped from Republican to Democratic ====
- Silver Bow (largest city: Butte)
- Missoula (largest city: Missoula)
- Rosebud (largest city: Colstrip)
- Roosevelt (largest city: Wolf Point)

Preceded by 2004 elections	United States House elections in Montana; 2006	Succeeded by 2008 elections
