= John Driscoll (Montana politician) =

American politician (born 1946)

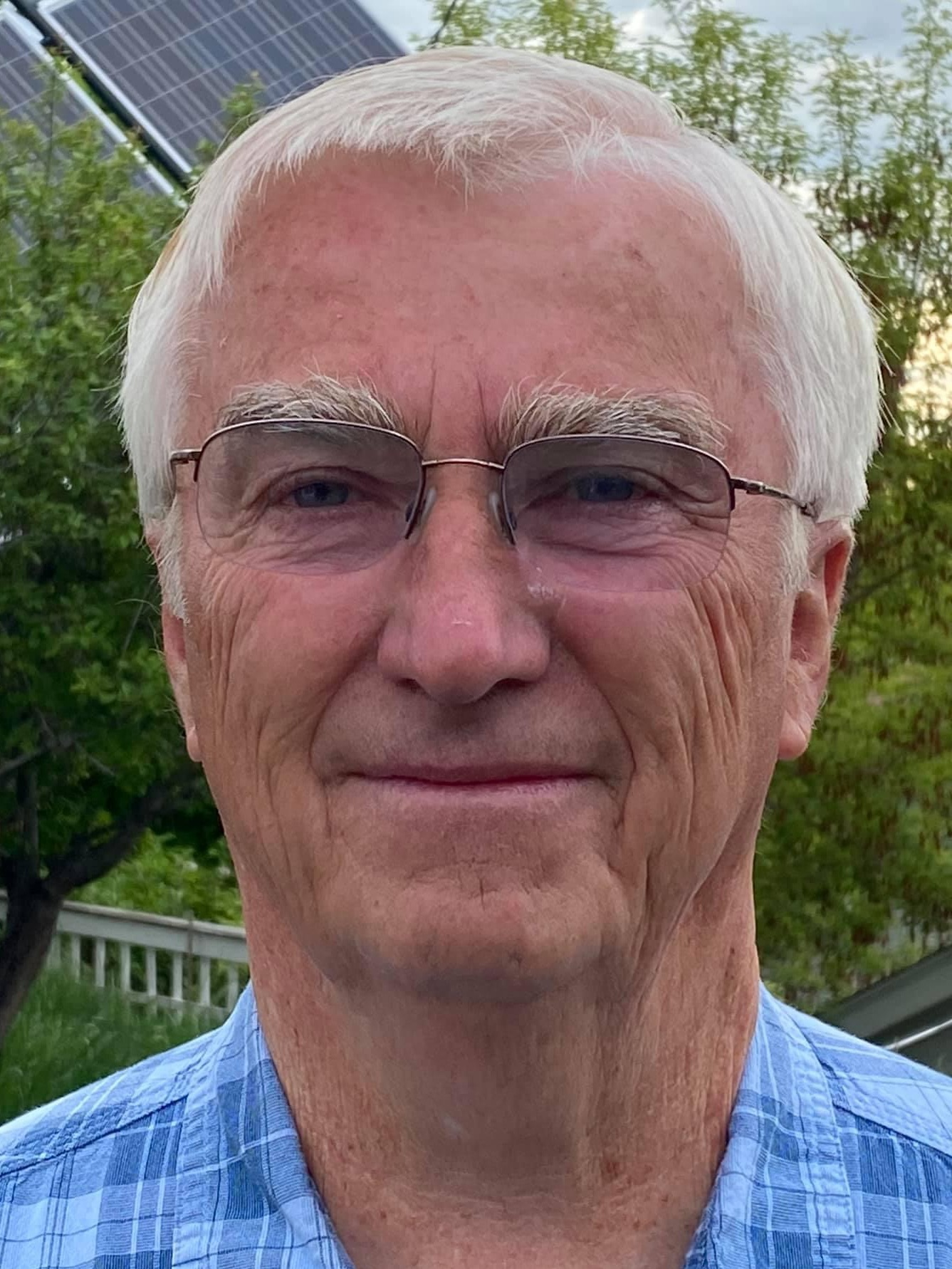
- Driscoll in 2023

Member of the Montana Public Service Commission for the 5th district
- In office January 3, 1981 – January 2, 1993

40th Speaker of the Montana House of Representatives
- In office January 3, 1977 – January 3, 1979
- Preceded by: Pat McKittrick
- Succeeded by: Harold Gerke

Member of the Montana House of Representatives
- In office January 3, 1973 – January 3, 1979
- Succeeded by: Bob Thoft
- Constituency: 22nd district (1973–1975); 91st district (1975–1979)

Personal details
- Born: John Brian Driscoll; July 17, 1946 (age 80) Los Angeles, California, U.S.
- Party: Democratic (1972–2020, 2024–present); Republican (2020–2024)
- Spouse: Kathryn
- Education: Gonzaga University (BA); Columbia University (MA); Harvard University (MPA); University of Montana (MBA)

Military service
- Branch/service: United States Army
- Years of service: 1970–2002
- Rank: Colonel
- Unit: Montana National Guard

John Brian Driscoll (born July 17, 1946) is an American writer and politician who served in the Montana House of Representatives from 1973 to 1979.

== Early life and education ==
Driscoll was born in Los Angeles, California. He was raised in Montana and attended Hamilton High School. Driscoll earned a Bachelor of Arts degree in political science from Gonzaga University, Master of Arts in international affairs from Columbia University, Master of Public Administration from Harvard University, and Master of Business Administration from the University of Montana.

== Career ==
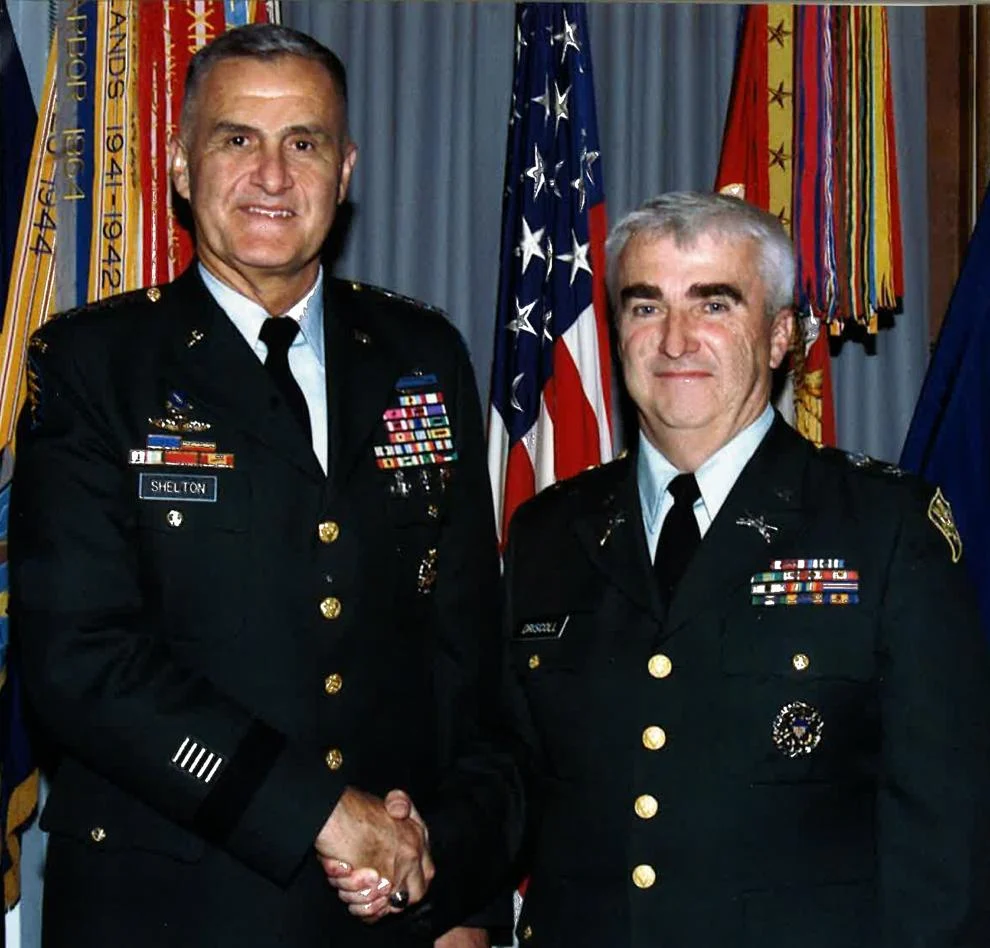
Driscoll with the Chairman of the Joint Chiefs of Staff September 2001

Driscoll served in the Army National Guard for 28 years, including strategic intelligence missions in the West Indies and Africa.

Driscoll was elected to the Montana House of Representatives in 1972 and served as House Majority Leader from 1975 to 1977. He served as Speaker from 1977 to 1979. In 1978, at the age of 32, he ran for the United States Senate, but finished a distant third in the Democratic primary to Max Baucus and Paul G. Hatfield. From 1981 to 1993, Driscoll served as a member of the Montana Public Service Commission.

He later served as a joint education planner for the Joint Chiefs of Staff in the 1990s. Eventually returning to Montana, Driscoll operated a small book-selling business out of his home in Helena.

In the 2008 election, Driscoll won the Democratic nomination for Montana's at-large congressional district. He subsequently lost to incumbent Denny Rehberg in the general election. In the 2014 election, he ran to succeed Steve Daines in Montana's at-large congressional district but lost the Democratic nomination to John Lewis. He was a candidate for U.S. Senate in the 2020 election, losing to incumbent Steve Daines in the Republican primary. In the 2024 election, Driscoll won the Democratic nomination for eastern Montana's 2nd congressional district. He faced Republican nominee Troy Downing in the general election, losing with 33.9% to Troy Downing's 65.7%.
