= Debra Lamm =

American politician

Chair of the Montana Republican Party
- In office June 10, 2017 – June 17, 2019
- Preceded by: Jeff Essmann
- Succeeded by: Don Kaltschmidt

Member of the Montana House of Representatives from the 60th district
- In office January 5, 2015 – January 2, 2017
- Preceded by: David Howard
- Succeeded by: Laurie Bishop

Personal details
- Born: 1951 or 1952 (age 73–74)
- Party: Republican
- Education: Northern Illinois University (BS); Lake Forest Graduate School of Management (MBA); Stetson University (JD)

Debra A. Lamm is an American politician from the state of Montana. She is a former chair of the Montana Republican Party and a former member of the Montana House of Representatives.

Lamm defeated Reilly Neill in the 2014 elections, 2,030 votes to 1,894. She served for one term. Lamm was elected chair of the Montana Republican Party in 2017, and served in the role until 2019. Lamm ran for the Montana's at-large congressional district of the United States House of Representatives in the 2020 election. She lost the nomination to Matt Rosendale.

Party political offices
Preceded by Jeff Essmann	Chair of the Montana Republican Party; 2017–2019	Succeeded by Don Kaltschmidt
