= 2010 United States House of Representatives election in Montana =

- November 2, 2010
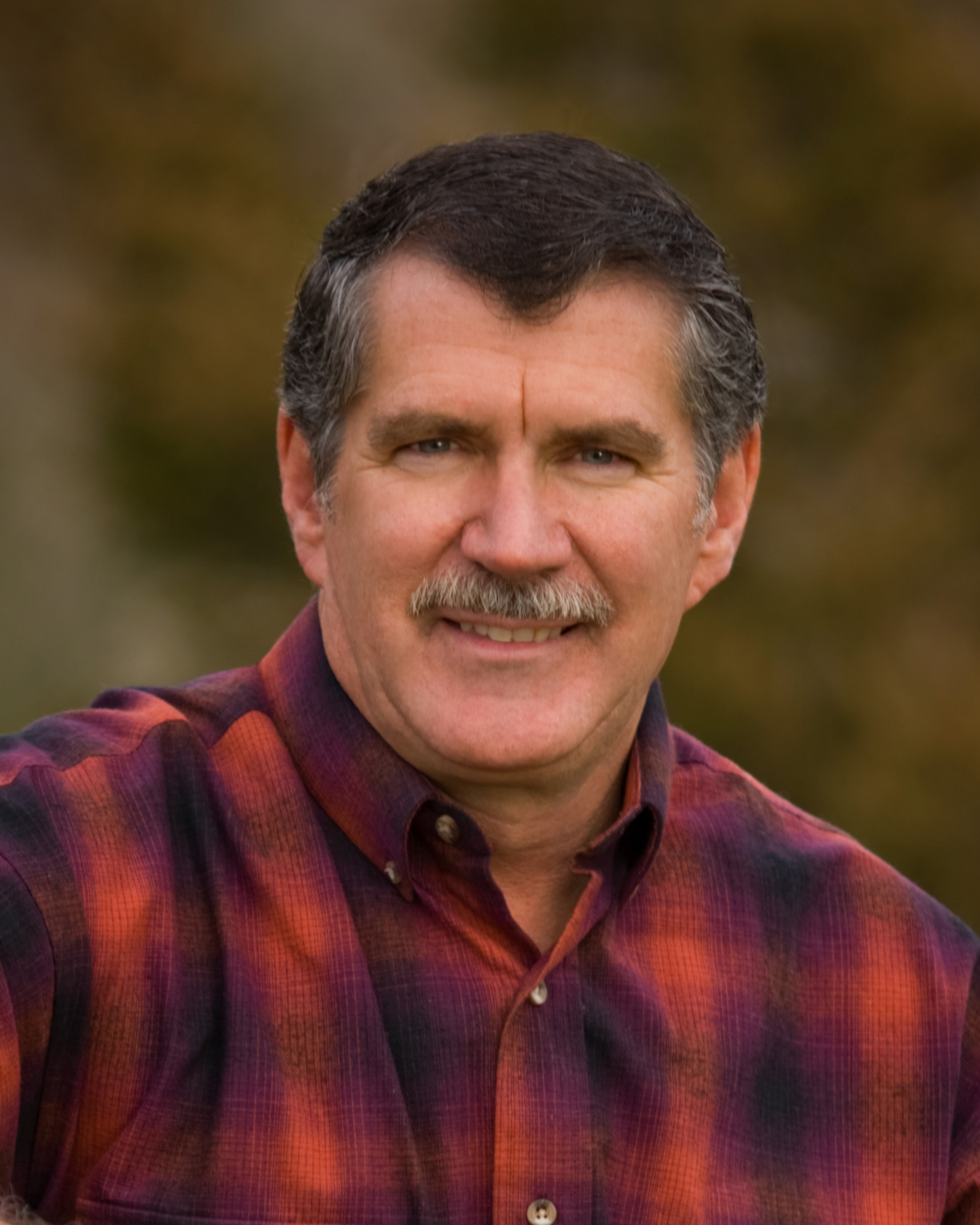

Nominee	Denny Rehberg	Dennis McDonald	Mike Fellows
Party	Republican	Democratic	Libertarian
Popular vote	217,696	121,954	20,691
Percentage	60.41%	33.84%	5.74%
- County results Rehberg: 40–50% 50–60% 60–70% 70–80% 80–90% McDonald: 50–60%
U.S. Representative before election
Denny Rehberg
Republican
Elected U.S. Representative
Denny Rehberg
Republican

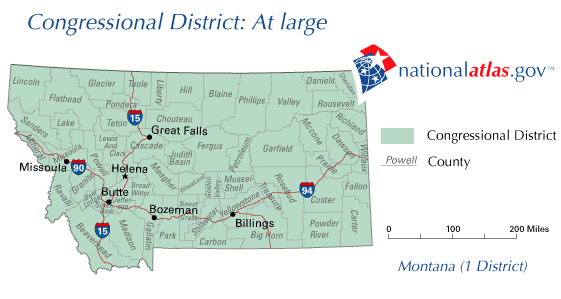
Montana's 1st congressional district

The 2010 congressional elections in Montana was held on November 2, 2010, and determined who would represent the state of Montana in the United States House of Representatives. Montana has one seat in the House, apportioned according to the 2000 United States census. Representatives are elected for two-year terms; the elected will serve in the 112th Congress from January 3, 2011, until January 3, 2013.

== Democratic primary ==
=== Candidates ===
- Dennis McDonald, former chairman of the Montana Democratic Party
- Tyler Gernant, attorney
- Melinda Gopher, Native American activist
- Sam Rankin

=== Results ===
Democratic Party primary results
Party	Candidate	Votes	%
Democratic	Dennis McDonald	24,014	38.42
Democratic	Tyler Gernant	15,177	24.28
Democratic	Melinda Gopher	13,170	21.07
Democratic	Sam Rankin	10,138	16.22
Total votes		62,499	100.00

== Republican primary ==
=== Candidates ===
- Denny Rehberg, incumbent U.S. Congressman
- Mark T. French, Clark Fork Valley Hospital scientist
- A. J. Otjen, Montana State University Billings professor

=== Results ===
Republican Party primary results
Party	Candidate	Votes	%
Republican	Denny Rehberg (inc.)	96,796	74.69
Republican	Mark T. French	25,344	19.56
Republican	A. J. Otjen	7,461	5.76
Total votes		129,601	100.00

== General election ==
=== Predictions ===
Source	Ranking	As of
The Cook Political Report	Safe R	November 1, 2010
Rothenberg	Safe R	November 1, 2010
Sabato's Crystal Ball	Safe R	November 1, 2010
RCP	Safe R	November 1, 2010
CQ Politics	Safe R	October 28, 2010
New York Times	Safe R	November 1, 2010
FiveThirtyEight	Safe R	November 1, 2010

=== Results ===
Montana At-large congressional district election, 2010
Party	Candidate	Votes	%
Republican	Denny Rehberg (inc.)	217,696	60.41
Democratic	Dennis McDonald	121,954	33.84
Libertarian	Mike Fellows	20,691	5.74
Total votes		360,341	100.00
Republican hold			

=== County results ===
	Denny Rehberg Republican		Dennis McDonald Democratic		Mike Fellows Libertarian		Margin		Total
County	Votes	%	Votes	%	Votes	%	Votes	%	Votes
Beaverhead	2,716	72.82%	840	22.52%	174	4.66%	984	26.38%	3,730
Big Horn	1,600	40.73%	2,152	54.79%	176	4.48%	552	14.05%	3,928
Blaine	1,165	63.77%	613	33.55%	49	2.68%	552	30.21%	1,827
Broadwater	1,895	73.25%	551	21.30%	141	5.45%	1,344	51.95%	2,587
Carbon	2,837	58.87%	1,667	34.59%	315	6.54%	1,170	24.28%	4,819
Carter	613	89.49%	54	7.88%	18	2.63%	559	81.61%	685
Cascade	16,241	62.05%	8,867	33.88%	1,064	4.07%	7,374	28.18%	26,172
Chouteau	1,703	73.98%	509	22.11%	90	3.91%	1,194	51.87%	2,302
Custer	2,699	66.54%	1,163	28.67%	194	4.78%	1,536	37.87%	4,056
Daniels	629	70.99%	202	22.80%	55	6.21%	427	48.19%	886
Dawson	2,459	67.83%'	1,007	27.78%	159	4.39%	1,452	40.06%	3,625
Deer Lodge	1,347	40.13%	1,828	54.45%	182	5.42%	481	14.33%	3,357
Fallon	864	78.76%	202	18.41%	31	2.83%	662	60.35%	1,097
Fergus	3,795	73.50%	1,130	21.89%	238	4.61%	2,665	51.62%	5,163
Flathead	21,153	67.68%	8,127	26.00%	1,975	6.32%	13,026	41.68	31,255
Gallatin	18,221	58.56%	11,125	35.75%	1,769	5.69%	7,096	22.81%	31,115
Garfield	569	84.05%	75	11.08%	33	4.87%	494	72.97%	677
Glacier	1,316	49.46%	1,246	46.82%	99	3.72%	70	2.63%	2,661
Golden Valley	278	68.64%	108	26.67%	19	4.69%	170	41.98%	405
Granite	985	68.45%	348	24.18%	106	7.37%	637	44.27%	1,439
Hill	3,142	60.70%	1,787	34.52%	247	4.77%	1,355	26.18%	5,176
Jefferson	3,430	65.25%	1,529	29.09%	298	5.67%	1,901	36.16%	5,257
Judith Basin	794	75.05%	229	21.64%	35	3.31%	565	53.40%	1,058
Lake	6,014	58.66%	3,517	34.31%	721	7.03%	2,497	24.36%	10,252
Lewis and Clark	14,221	56.54%	9,684	38.50%	1,246	4.95%	4,537	18.04%	25,151
Liberty	706	76.81%	178	19.28%	39	4.22%	528	57.20%	923
Lincoln	4,926	69.16%	1,688	23.70%	509	7.15%	3,238	45.46%	7,123
Madison	2,541	70.04%	847	23.35%	240	6.62%	1,694	46.69%	3,628
McCone	631	71.62%	220	24.97%	30	3.41%	411	46.65%	881
Meagher	610	74.66%	152	18.60%	55	6.73%	458	56.06%	817
Mineral	1,135	62.67%	530	29.27%	146	8.06%	605	33.41%	1,811
Missoula	17,789	47.14%	17,637	46.73%	2,314	6.13%	152	0.40%	37,740
Musselshell	1,356	72.40%	385	20.56%	132	7.05%	971	51.84%	1,873
Park	4,148	60.28%	2,355	34.22%	378	5.49%	1,793	26.06%	6,881
Petroleum	194	78.23%	40	16.13%	14	5.65%	154	62.10%	248
Phillips	1,490	80.76%	274	14.85%	81	4.39%	1,216	65.91%	1,845
Pondera	1,513	72.22%	516	24.63%	66	3.15%	997	47.59%	2,095
Powder River	708	80.18%	139	15.74%	36	4.08%	569	64.44%	883
Powell	1,513	68.90%	538	24.50%	145	6.60%	975	44.40%	2,196
Prairie	434	71.93%	138	22.89%	31	5.14%	296	49.09%	603
Ravalli	11,506	65.07%	4,887	27.64%	1,290	7.30%	6,619	37.43%	17,683
Richland	2,767	74.52%	791	21.30%	155	4.17%	1,976	53.22%	3,713
Roosevelt	1,559	54.30%	1,211	42.18%	101	3.52%	338	11.77%	2,871
Rosebud	1,507	56.76%	990	37.29%	158	5.95%	517	19.47%	2,655
Sanders	3,386	65.99%	1,324	25.80%	421	8.21%	2,062	40.19%	5,131
Sheridan	1,052	63.72%	523	31.68%	76	4.60%	529	32.04%	1,651
Silver Bow	5,133	43.71%	6,044	51.47%	586	4.99%	911	7.76%	11,743
Stillwater	2,549	68.01%	984	26.25%	215	5.74%	1,565	41.76%	3,748
Sweet Grass	1,250	72.55%	394	22.87%	79	4.59%	856	49.68%	1,723
Teton	1,932	70.80%	654	23.96%	143	5.24%	1,278	46.83%	2,729
Toole	1,293	73.97%	366	20.94%	89	5.09%	927	53.03%	1,748
Treasure	272	70.83%	93	24.22%	19	4.95%	179	46.61%	384
Valley	2,300	68.23%	944	28.00%	127	3.77%	1,356	40.23%	3,371
Wheatland	713	71.09%	250	24.93%	40	3.99%	463	46.16%	1,003
Wibaux	349	72.56%	110	22.87%	22	4.57%	239	49.69%	481
Yellowstone	29,768	57.82%	18,192	35.34%	3,520	6.84%	11,576	22.49%	51,480

==== Counties that flipped from Democratic to Republican ====
- Glacier (largest city: Cut Bank)

== See also ==
- 2010 Montana elections

Preceded by 2008 elections	United States House elections in Montana; 2010	Succeeded by 2012 elections
