= 2008 United States House of Representatives election in Montana =

- November 4, 2008
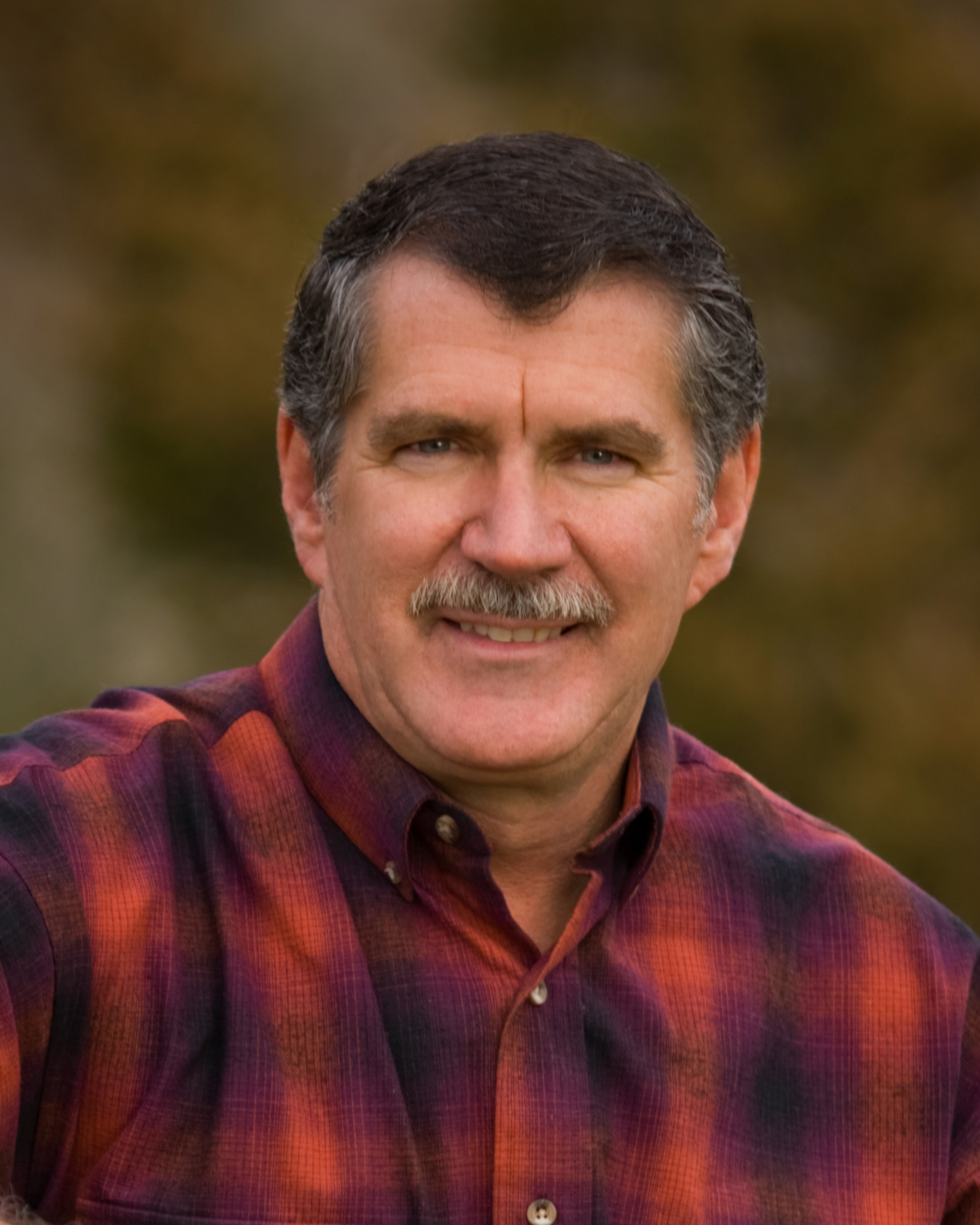

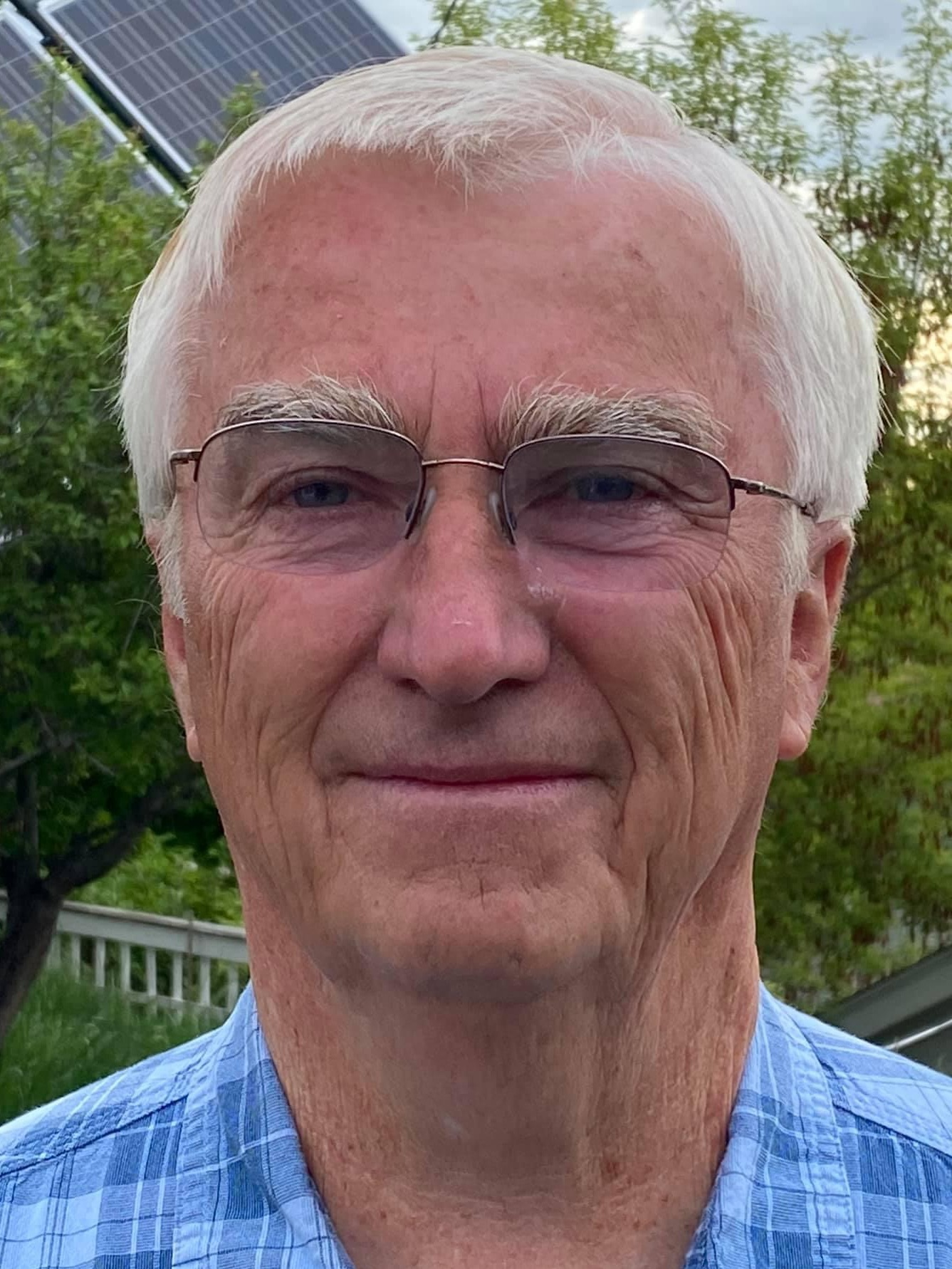
Nominee	Denny Rehberg	John Driscoll
Party	Republican	Democratic
Popular vote	308,470	155,930
Percentage	64.14%	32.42%
- County results Rehberg: 40–50% 50–60% 60–70% 70–80% 80–90% >90% Driscoll: 40–50% 50–60%
U.S. Representative before election
Denny Rehberg
Republican
Elected U.S. Representative
Denny Rehberg
Republican

The 2008 United States House of Representatives election in Montana took place on Tuesday, November 4, 2008. Voters selected a single representative for the at-large district (map), who ran on a statewide ballot. Incumbent Representative Denny Rehberg sought re-election; he was originally elected in 2000 with 52% of the vote. He was formerly a Billings area rancher, state legislator (1984–90) and Montana lieutenant governor (1991–97).

Concurrently, Democrats won all elections for statewide elected offices, including incumbent Governor Brian Schweitzer who won a landslide 65.47% of the vote. In other federal races, incumbent Senator Max Baucus won a landslide victory in the concurrent senate election against perennial candidate Bob Kelleher; while Barack Obama lost the state in the concurrent presidential election, he lost by a narrow 2.48% margin, winning 47.11% of the vote, the highest since Lyndon B. Johnson in 1964. However, Rehberg bucked the trend and comfortably won re-election with 64.1% of the vote.

== Democratic primary ==
=== Candidates ===
- Robert Candee, perennial candidate
- John Driscoll, former speaker of the Montana House of Representatives and candidate for U.S. Senate in 1978
- Jim Hunt, attorney

=== Results ===
Democratic Party primary results
Party	Candidate	Votes	%
Democratic	John Driscoll	70,176	49.23
Democratic	Jim Hunt	59,768	41.93
Democratic	Robert Candee	12,598	8.84
Total votes		142,542	100.00

== Republican primary ==
=== Candidates ===
- Denny Rehberg, incumbent U.S. congressman

=== Results ===
Republican Party primary results
Party	Candidate	Votes	%
Republican	Denny Rehberg (incumbent)	90,492	100.00
Total votes		90,492	100.00

== General election ==
=== Predictions ===
Source	Ranking	As of
The Cook Political Report	Safe R	November 6, 2008
Rothenberg	Safe R	November 2, 2008
Sabato's Crystal Ball	Safe R	November 6, 2008
Real Clear Politics	Safe R	November 7, 2008
CQ Politics	Safe R	November 6, 2008

=== Results ===
Montana at-large congressional district election, 2008
Party	Candidate	Votes	%
Republican	Denny Rehberg (incumbent)	308,470	64.14
Democratic	John Driscoll	155,930	32.42
Libertarian	Mike Fellows	16,500	3.43
Total votes		480,900	100.00
Republican hold			

==== Counties that flipped from Democratic to Republican ====
- Missoula (largest city: Missoula)
- Rosebud (largest city: Colstrip)
- Roosevelt (largest city: Wolf Point)

Preceded by 2006 elections	United States House elections in Montana; 2008	Succeeded by 2010 elections
