= 2010 Montana elections =

- November 2, 2010

Elections were held in Montana on November 2, 2010. Primary elections took place on June 8, 2010.

== Federal ==
=== United States House ===
Denny Rehberg, Montana's current at-large Congressman, ran for re-election. He defeated Libertarian Mike Fellows and Democrat Dennis McDonald.

== State ==
Many state offices in Montana, including Governor, Lieutenant Governor, Secretary of State, Attorney General, Auditor, and Superintendent of Public Instruction, were not up for re-election in 2010.

=== Supreme Court Justice ===
On the Montana Supreme Court, Supreme Court Justice No. 2 and Supreme Court Justice No. 4 were up for election.

=== District Court Judge ===
Six seats were available in: District 1, Department 4; District 4, Department 4; District 11, Department 4; District 13, Department 6; District 19, Department 1; and District 21, Department 1.

=== Public Service Commissioner ===
Two Public Service Commissioners, representing District 1 and District 5, were elected in 2010.

=== State senator ===
Twenty-five seats in the Montana Senate were up for election in 2010.

=== State representative ===
All one hundred seats of the Montana House of Representatives were up for election in 2010.

=== Judicial positions ===
Multiple judicial positions were up for election in 2010.

- Montana judicial elections, 2010 at Judgepedia

=== Ballot measures ===
Three statewide initiatives were voted on and all passed.
