= 2004 United States House of Representatives election in Montana =

- November 2, 2004
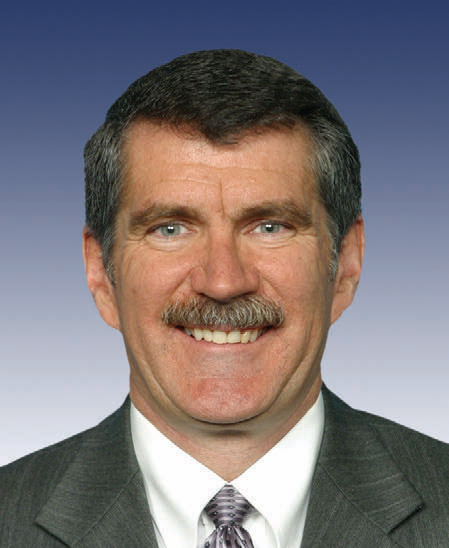

Nominee	Denny Rehberg	Tracy Velazquez
Party	Republican	Democratic
Popular vote	286,076	145,606
Percentage	64.40%	32.78%
- County results Rehberg: 40–50% 50–60% 60–70% 70–80% 80–90% >90% Velazquez: 40–50% 50–60%
U.S. Representative before election
Denny Rehberg
Republican
Elected U.S. Representative
Denny Rehberg
Republican

The 2004 United States House of Representatives election in Montana were held on November 2, 2004, to determine who would represent the state of Montana in the United States House of Representatives. Montana had one, at-large district in the House, apportioned according to the 2000 United States census, due to its low population. Representatives are elected for two-year terms.

== General election ==
=== Predictions ===
Source	Ranking	As of
The Cook Political Report	Safe R	October 29, 2004
Sabato's Crystal Ball	Safe R	November 1, 2004

=== Results ===
Montana At-large congressional district election, 2004
Party	Candidate	Votes	%
Republican	Denny Rehberg (inc.)	286,076	64.40
Democratic	Tracy Velazquez	145,606	32.78
Libertarian	Mike Fellows	12,548	2.82
Total votes		444,230	100.00
Republican hold			

==== Counties that flipped from Democratic to Republican ====
- Silver Bow (largest city: Butte)

Preceded by 2002 elections	United States House elections in Montana; 2004	Succeeded by 2006 elections
