= Nancy Keenan =

American politician

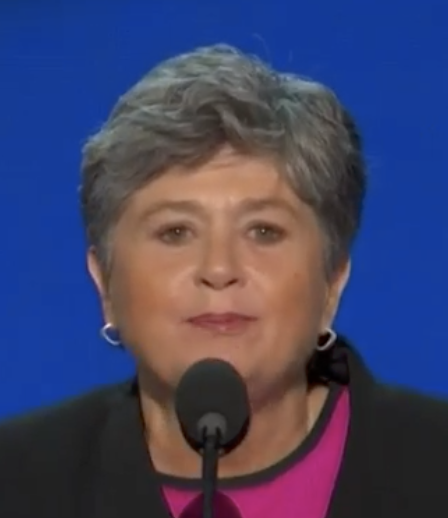
- Keenan at the 2012 DNC

14th Montana Superintendent of Public Education
- In office January 2, 1989 – January 1, 2001
- Preceded by: Ed Argenbright
- Succeeded by: Linda McCulloch

Member of the Montana House of Representatives from the 66th district
- In office January 7, 1985 – January 2, 1989
- Preceded by: Jim Jensen
- Succeeded by: Rob Blotkamp

Member of the Montana House of Representatives from the 89th district
- In office January 3, 1983 – January 7, 1985
- Preceded by: Joe Kanduch, Sr.
- Succeeded by: Cal Winslow

Personal details
- Born: February 14, 1952 (age 74) Anaconda, Montana, U.S.
- Party: Democratic
- Education: Montana State University, Bozeman; University of Montana, Missoula

Nancy Keenan (born February 14, 1952) is an American politician, and was from 2015 until 2019 the executive director of the Montana Democratic Party. Prior to that, she was elected to several terms in the Montana House of Representatives (1983–1989) and as superintendent of the Montana Office of Public Instruction (1989–2001). She also served as president of the abortion rights organization NARAL Pro-Choice America from 2004 to 2013.

== Biography ==
Keenan was born in Anaconda, Montana to Ann and P. J. Keenan. She earned an undergraduate degree in education from Montana State University and a master's degree from the University of Montana. Keenan began her career as a special-education teacher before winning election to the Montana House of Representatives. In 1988 she won the first of three terms as the statewide elected Superintendent of the Montana Office of Public Instruction. She served until 2000. In 2000, Keenan ran for Montana's at-large congressional district seat in the U.S. House of Representatives as a Democrat. She was defeated by Republican Denny Rehberg. From 2003-2004, Keenan worked as the Education Policy Director of the organization People For the American Way (PFAW).

Keenan became president of NARAL Pro-Choice America in 2004. As president, Keenan advocated for access to abortion, but she has also attempted to change the nature of the debate around abortion rights issues in the United States. For example, in 2006, she said that while abortion rights and anti-abortion people don't agree on abortion "we should be able to agree that we can reduce unintended pregnancies" by (as a NARAL ad stated) "guaranteeing women's access to birth control, including the 'morning-after' pill, making sure our kids receive honest, realistic sex education, and increasing support for family-planning services." In a speech presented on the 35th anniversary of Roe v. Wade, Keenan asked supporters to acknowledge "a woman's right to choose is a morally complex issue, and a lot less black and white than it's been made out to be." She discussed the pro-choice position in terms of moral values. She reiterated the position that reducing unintended pregnancy is a "core moral value" in her speech at the 2008 Democratic National Convention. On August 22, 2012, it was announced that she would be a speaker at the Democratic National Convention in Charlotte, North Carolina. In April 2015, it was announced that Keenan would take over as executive director of the Montana Democratic Party, effective April 20, 2015.

Washingtonian Magazine named Nancy Keenan as one of the 100 most powerful women in Washington, DC in 2006. She has appeared on MSNBC and other news broadcasts, and is frequently quoted by The Washington Post, The New York Times, Associated Press, and other news services.
