= 2008 Montana State Auditor election =

- November 4, 2008
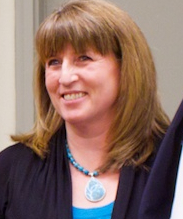

| Nominee | Monica Lindeen | Duane Grimes |
| Party | Democratic | Republican |
| Popular vote | 244,810 | 213,484 |
| Percentage | 53.42% | 46.58% |
- County results Lindeen: 50–60% 60–70% 70–80% Grimes: 50–60% 60–70% 70–80%
State Auditor before election
John Morrison
Democratic
Elected State Auditor
Monica Lindeen
Democratic

The 2008 Montana State Auditor election was held on November 4, 2008, to elect the Montana State Auditor. Democratic incumbent John Morrison was term-limited and ineligible to run for re-election. Democratic former Montana state house representative Monica Lindeen won the election, defeating Republican former Montana state senator and previously unsuccessful 2004 candidate for auditor Duane Grimes by six percentage points.

== Democratic primary ==
=== Candidates ===
- Monica Lindeen, former Montana state representative (1999–2005)

=== Results ===
Democratic primary results
| Party | Candidate | Votes | % |
|---|---|---|---|
| Democratic | Monica Lindeen | 143,408 | 42.04% |
| Total votes | | 143,408 | 100.00% |

== Republican primary ==
=== Candidates ===
- Duane Grimes, former Montana state senator (1999–2005) and 2004 Republican nominee for Montana State Auditor

=== Results ===
Republican primary results
| Party | Candidate | Votes | % |
|---|---|---|---|
| Republican | Duane Grimes | 75,050 | 56.64% |
| Total votes | | 75,050 | 100.00% |

== General election ==
=== Candidates ===
- Monica Lindeen, former Montana state representative (1999–2005) (Democratic)
- Duane Grimes, former Montana state senator (1999–2005) (Republican)

=== Results ===
2008 Montana State Auditor election results
| Party | Candidate | Votes | % | ±% |
|---|---|---|---|---|
| Democratic | Monica Lindeen | 244,810 | 53.42% | −2.45% |
| Republican | Duane Grimes | 213,484 | 46.58% | +2.45% |
| Total votes | | 458,294 | 100.00% | |
| Democratic hold | | | | |
