= Laurie Bishop =

American politician

Member of the Montana House of Representatives from the 60th district
- In office January 2, 2017 – January 6, 2025
- Preceded by: Debra Lamm
- Succeeded by: Alanah Griffith

Personal details
- Born: 1970 (age 55–56) Rochester, New York, U.S.
- Party: Democratic
- Spouse: Storrs Bishop
- Children: 3
- Education: Syracuse University (BA)

Laurie Bishop (born 1970) is an American politician who served in the Montana House of Representatives from the 60th district between 2017 and 2025, as a member of the Democratic Party. During her tenure in the state house she served as chair of the Democratic caucus.

== Early life and education ==
Laurie Bishop was born in 1970, in Rochester, New York, and grew up in Illinois and Virginia. She graduated from high school in Ohio, and graduated from Syracuse University with a Bachelor of Arts in sociology. She moved to Montana in 1996. She has been married to Storrs Bishop, with whom she had three children, for twenty-eight years and reside in Livingston, Montana.

== Political career ==
Bishop ran for a seat in the Montana House of Representatives from the 60th district in the 2016 election with the Democratic nomination and defeated incumbent Republican Representative Debra Lamm. She defeated Republican nominee Dan Skattum in the 2018 election. Bishop defeated Republican nominee Joe Lamm, the husband of former Representative Lamm, in the 2020 election.

Bishop announced on July 1, 2021, that she would seek the Democratic nomination for a seat in the United States House of Representatives from Montana's 2nd congressional district, which had yet to be drawn after being gained in the 2020 census, in 2022. She ended her campaign after redistricting as she was drawn into the more Republican district in eastern Montana.

She served as the chair of the Democratic caucus in the state house during the 2019 session and delivered the Democratic response to Governor Greg Gianforte's State of the State Address in 2021. Bishop retired from the Montana House of Representatives in 2025 due to term limits, which caps House members to 4 terms.

=== LGBTQIA+ rights ===
Bishop supports transgender rights and supports providing gender affirming care to youth that identify as transgender.

== Electoral history ==
2016 Montana House of Representatives 60th district election
Primary election
Party	Candidate	Votes	%
Democratic	Laurie Bishop	1,426	100.00%
Total votes		1,426	100.00%
General election
Democratic	Laurie Bishop	2,858	52.30%
Republican	Debra Lamm (incumbent)	2,607	47.70%
Total votes		5,465	100.00%
Democratic gain from Republican			

2018 Montana House of Representatives 60th district election
Primary election
Party	Candidate	Votes	%
Democratic	Laurie Bishop (incumbent)	1,552	100.00%
Total votes		1,552	100.00%
General election
Democratic	Laurie Bishop (incumbent)	3,232	57.52%
Republican	Dan Skattum	2,387	42.49%
Total votes		5,619	100.00%
Democratic hold			

2020 Montana House of Representatives 60th district election
Primary election
Party	Candidate	Votes	%
Democratic	Laurie Bishop (incumbent)	2,098	100.00%
Total votes		2,098	100.00%
General election
Democratic	Laurie Bishop (incumbent)	3,776	56.33%
Republican	Joe Lamm	2,927	43.67%
Total votes		6,703	100.00%
Democratic hold			

2022 Montana House of Representatives 60th district election
Primary election
Party	Candidate	Votes	%
Democratic	Laurie Bishop (incumbent)	1,265	100.00%
Total votes		1,265	100.00%
General election
Democratic	Laurie Bishop (incumbent)	3,085	57.85%
Republican	Joe Lamm	2,248	42.15%
Total votes		5,333	100.00%
Democratic hold			
