= 2012 United States House of Representatives election in Montana =

- November 6, 2012
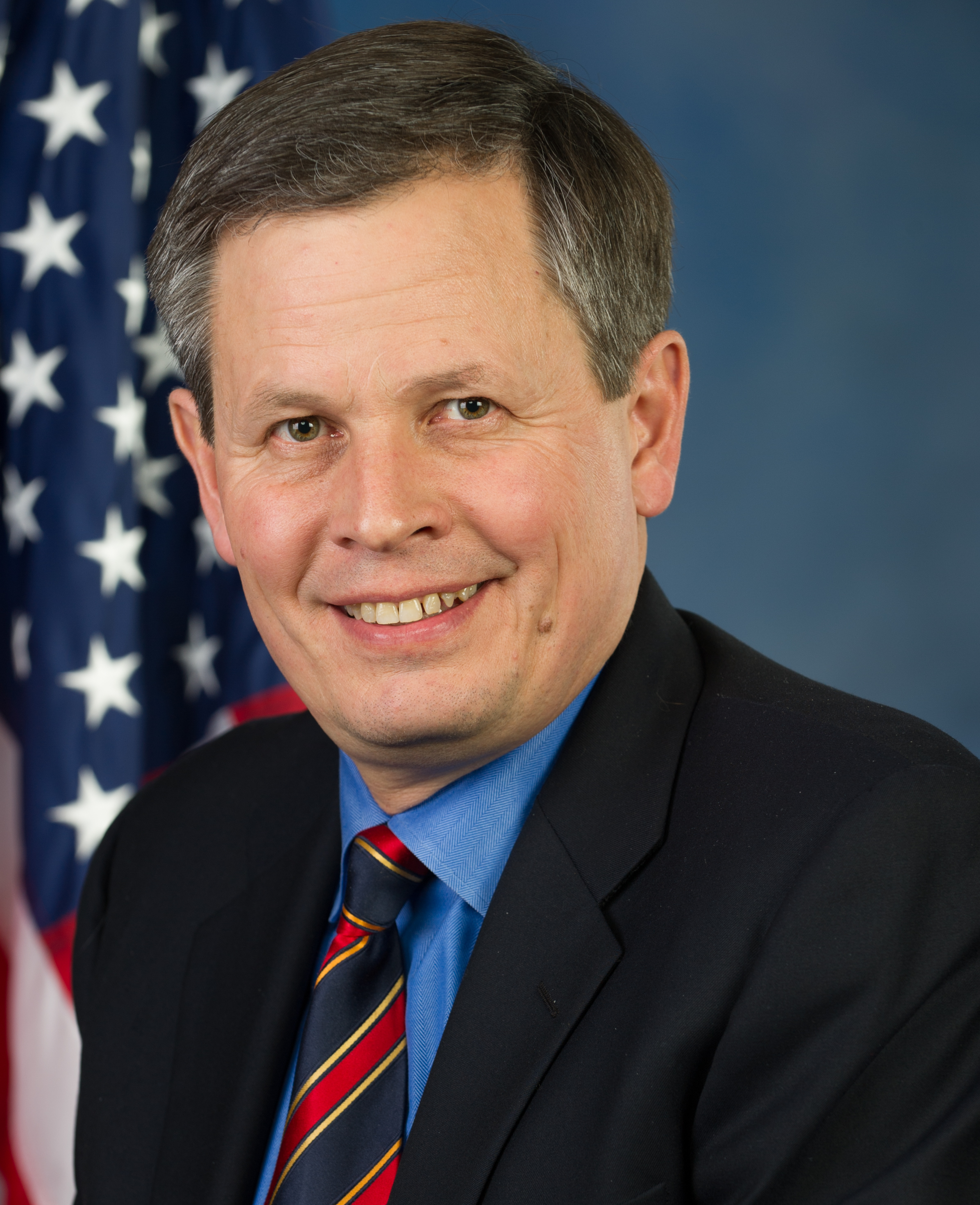

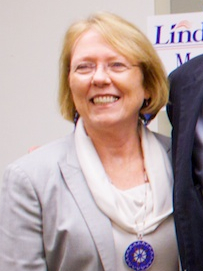
Nominee	Steve Daines	Kim Gillan
Party	Republican	Democratic
Popular vote	255,468	204,939
Percentage	53.25%	42.72%
- County results Daines: 40–50% 50–60% 60–70% 70–80% 80–90% Gillan: 50–60% 60–70%
U.S. Representative before election
Denny Rehberg
Republican
Elected U.S. Representative
Steve Daines
Republican

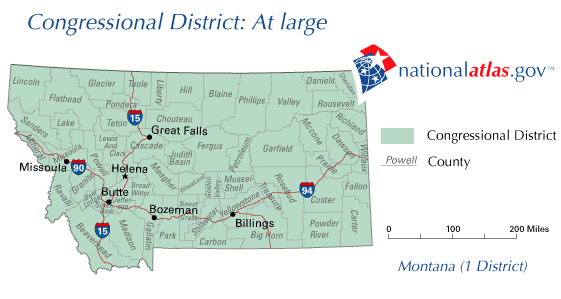
Montana's at-large congressional district

The 2012 congressional election in Montana was held on November 6, 2012, to determine who would represent the state of Montana in the United States House of Representatives. At the time, Montana had one seat in the House. Incumbent Denny Rehberg did not run for reelection, choosing instead to run unsuccessfully for the seat in the U.S. Senate. A primary election was held on June 5, 2012. Republican businessman Steve Daines won the open seat.

== Republican primary ==
=== Candidates ===
==== Nominee ====
- Steve Daines, businessman and nominee for lieutenant governor in 2008

===== Eliminated in primary =====
- Eric Brosten, author and engineer
- Vincent Melkus, student at Colorado Mesa University and former Marine

==== Withdrawn ====
- John Abarr, white supremacist and Ku Klux Klan organizer.

=== Hypothetical polling ===
Poll source	Date(s) administered	Sample size	Margin of error	John Abarr	Steve Daines	Other	Undecided
Public Policy Polling	June 16–19, 2011	382	± 5.0%	14%	22%	—	64%

=== Results ===
Republican primary results
Party	Candidate	Votes	%
Republican	Steve Daines	82,843	71.2
Republican	Eric Brosten	21,012	18.1
Republican	Vincent Melkus	12,420	10.7
Total votes		116,275	100.0

== Democratic primary ==
=== Candidates ===
==== Nominee ====
- Kim Gillan, state senator from Billings

==== Eliminated in primary ====
- Sam Rankin, real estate salesman and candidate for this seat in 2010
- Diane Smith, businesswoman
- Dave Strohmaier, Missoula city council member
- Rob Stutz, attorney
- Jason Ward, farmer and construction manager for the Crow Nation
- Franke Wilmer, state representative from Bozeman

==== Declined ====
- Melinda Gopher, writer and candidate for this seat in 2010
- Brian Schweitzer, Governor of Montana

=== Polling ===
Poll source	Date(s) administered	Sample size	Margin of error	Kim Gillan	Sam Rankin	Diane Smith	Dave Strohmaier	Rob Stutz	Jason Ward	Franke Wilmer	Undecided
Public Policy Polling	April 26–29, 2012	332	± 5.4%	21%	4%	13%	9%	1%	0%	11%	41%

=== Results ===
Democratic primary results
Party	Candidate	Votes	%
Democratic	Kim Gillan	25,077	31.0
Democratic	Franke Wilmer	14,836	18.4
Democratic	Diane Smith	12,618	15.6
Democratic	Dave Strohmaier	11,366	14.1
Democratic	Sam Rankin	9,382	11.6
Democratic	Jason Ward	4,959	6.1
Democratic	Rob Stutz	2,586	3.2
Total votes		80,824	100.0

== Libertarian primary ==
=== Candidates ===
==== Nominee ====
- David Kaiser

== General election ==
=== Endorsements ===
Steve Daines (R)

Organizations

- National Republican Congressional Committee "Vanguard" Program
Kim Gillan (D)

Organizations

- Democratic Congressional Campaign Committee "Red to Blue" Program

=== Polling ===
Poll source	Date(s) administered	Sample size	Margin of error	Steve Daines (R)	Kim Gillan (D)	David Kaiser (L)	Undecided
Public Policy Polling (D)	November 2–3, 2012	737	± 3.6%	48%	44%	3%	4%
Mason-Dixon	October 29–31, 2012	625	± 4.0%	51%	40%	1%	8%
Pharos Research Group	October 26–28, 2012	799	± 4.9%	52%	45%	–	4%
Pharos Research Group	October 19–21, 2012	400	± 4.9%	47%	41%	–	12%
Public Policy Polling (D)	October 8–10, 2012	737	± 3.6%	43%	34%	10%	12%
MSU-Billings	September 27–30, 2012	477	± 4.6%	36%	23%	3%	38%
Mellman (D-Montana JET PAC)	September 23–26, 2012	600	± 4.0%	36%	34%	5%	25%
Mason-Dixon	September 17–19, 2012	625	± 4.0%	46%	38%	2%	14%
Public Policy Polling (D)	September 10–11, 2012	656	± 3.8%	40%	37%	9%	15%
Public Policy Polling (D)	April 26–29, 2012	934	± 3.2%	33%	27%	—	40%
Public Policy Polling (D)	June 16–19, 2011	819	± 3.4%	35%	27%	—	38%

Hypothetical polling

Poll source	Date(s) administered	Sample size	Margin of error	John Abarr (R)	Kim Gillan (D)	Other	Undecided
Public Policy Polling (report)	June 16–19, 2011	819	± 3.4%	30%	26%	—	44%

Poll source	Date(s) administered	Sample size	Margin of error	John Abarr (R)	Franke Wilmer (D)	Other	Undecided
Public Policy Polling (report)	June 16–19, 2011	819	± 3.4%	33%	25%	—	42%

Poll source	Date(s) administered	Sample size	Margin of error	Steve Daines (R)	Franke Wilmer (D)	Other	Undecided
Public Policy Polling	April 26–29, 2012	934	± 3.2%	36%	25%	—	39%
Public Policy Polling	June 16–19, 2011	819	± 3.4%	35%	25%	—	40%

==== Predictions ====
Source	Ranking	As of
The Cook Political Report	Likely R	November 5, 2012
Rothenberg	Safe R	November 2, 2012
Roll Call	Likely R	November 4, 2012
Sabato's Crystal Ball	Likely R	November 5, 2012
NY Times	Safe R	November 4, 2012
RCP	Likely R	November 4, 2012
The Hill	Likely R	November 4, 2012

=== Results ===
Montana's at-large congressional district, 2012
Party	Candidate	Votes	%	±%
Republican	Steve Daines	255,468	53.25%	−7.16%
Democratic	Kim Gillan	204,939	42.72%	+8.88%
Libertarian	David Kaiser	19,333	4.03%	−1.71%
Total votes		479,740	100.0%	N/A
Republican hold				

==== Counties that flipped from Republican to Democratic ====
- Missoula (Largest city: Missoula)
- Glacier (largest city: Cut Bank)
- Roosevelt (largest city: Wolf Point)
- Hill (largest city: Havre)
- Blaine (largest city: Chinooko)
