= Robert Alan Stutz =

American lawyer

Robert Stutz
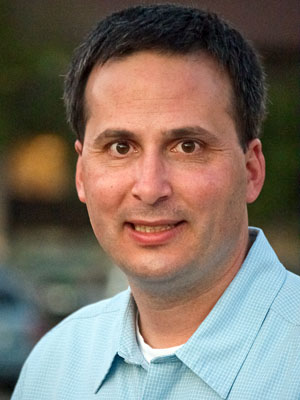
- Born: October 20, 1972 (age 52)
- Occupation: Attorney

Robert Alan Stutz (born October 20, 1972) is the former Chief Legal Counsel to the Montana State Legislature.

== Chief Legal Counsel ==
Stutz served as the Chief Legal Counsel to the Montana legislature for the 2011 session. During this period he managed the Legal Services Office for the legislature, represented the legislature in litigation, provided legal opinions to legislators, and reviewed drafts of legislation.
