= Monica Lindeen =

American politician from Montana

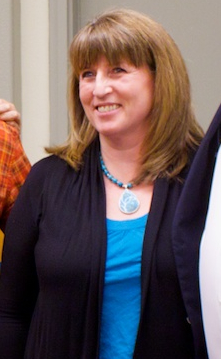

Auditor of Montana
- In office January 5, 2009 – January 2, 2017
- Governor: Brian Schweitzer; Steve Bullock
- Preceded by: John Morrison
- Succeeded by: Matt Rosendale

Member of the Montana House of Representatives from the 7th district
- In office 1999–2004
- Succeeded by: Jon Sonju

Personal details
- Born: May 16, 1962 (age 64) Ogden, Utah, U.S.
- Party: Democratic
- Education: Montana State University, Billings (BS)

Monica Lindeen (born May 16, 1962) is an American politician who served as the Montana State Auditor. She was elected in 2008 and re-elected in 2012. Due to term limits, she was ineligible to run again in 2016, and became a candidate for Montana Secretary of State.

== Early life and education ==
Lindeen was born in Ogden, Utah. She earned a Bachelor of Science degree in education from Montana State University Billings, specializing in English and history.

== Career ==
Lindeen was a Democratic member of the Montana House of Representatives from 1999 to 2006, representing House District 43. Lindeen served as vice chair of the Montana Democratic Party from 1997 to 2000. In 1996, she ran for House District 7 but lost to the incumbent.

Lindeen was a candidate for the United States House of Representatives in 2006, running against Republican incumbent Denny Rehberg and Libertarian Mike Fellows for the lone Montana seat in the U.S. Congress. Lindeen lost the election with 39% of the vote to Rehberg's 59% and Fellows' 2%.

=== State Auditor ===
On February 19, 2007, Lindeen announced her plans to run for State Auditor in the 2008 elections.

Lindeen named Walt Schweitzer as Deputy State Auditor. Schweitzer, the brother of Governor Brian Schweitzer and a campaign consultant, had managed Lindeen's campaign. In the summer of 2009, an employee of the office, Laura McGee, formally complained to Lindeen that Schweitzer improperly "solicited campaign contributions from employees in the State Auditor’s office on state time." McGee was subsequently fired, and Schweitzer claimed to have no recollection of the events. McGee then filed a wrongful discharge lawsuit and an independent investigation was launched. Although the independent investigation did not substantiate McGee's allegation, in part because she did not cooperate with the investigator, the State Auditor's office nonetheless chose to settle the lawsuit. According to the Billings Gazette, "Investigating and settling McGee’s complaint cost the Auditor’s Office about $62,500," and in addition, Lindeen reinstated McGee to employment for a period of 16 months at her previous salary of $45,000 a year and allowed for remote work.

=== National Association of Insurance Commissioners ===
On November 4, 2011, Lindeen was elected Secretary-Treasurer of the National Association of Insurance Commissioners. In 2013, Lindeen received the Excellence in Consumer Advocacy Award, presented by the NAIC's Consumer Representatives. She received the honor in recognition for her work as a strong voice for consumer protection and her dedication in maintaining states’ rights in insurance regulation. She was elected to serve as the president of the NAIC throughout 2015. After serving eight years as the State Commissioner of Securities and Insurance she entered the campaign for US House of Representatives but lost the seat to Republican Denny Rehberg

== Electoral history ==
Montana House of Representatives 7th District Election, 1996
Party	Candidate	Votes	%
Republican	Dan Holland	1,842	53.11
Democratic	Monica Lindeen	1,626	46.89

Montana House of Representatives 7th District Election, 1998
Party	Candidate	Votes	%
Democratic	Monica Lindeen	1,674	52.26
Republican	Dan Holland	1,529	47.74

Montana House of Representatives 7th District Election, 2000
Party	Candidate	Votes	%
Democratic	Monica Lindeen	2,039	58
Republican	Tom Asay	1,489	42

Montana House of Representatives 7th District Election, 2002
Party	Candidate	Votes	%
Democratic	Monica Lindeen	1,672	55.31
Republican	Tom Nansel	1,351	44.69

Montana House of Representatives 43rd District Election, 2004
Party	Candidate	Votes	%
Democratic	Monica Lindeen	2,659	58.78
Republican	Gretchen Schubert	1,865	41.22

Montana At-Large Congressional District Democratic Primary Election, 2006
Party	Candidate	Votes	%
Democratic	Monica Lindeen	66,364	71.09
Democratic	Eric Jon Gunderson	26,990	28.91

Montana At-Large Congressional District Election, 2006
Party	Candidate	Votes	%
Republican	Denny Rehberg	239,124	58.88
Democratic	Monica Lindeen	158,916	39.13
Libertarian	Mike Fellows	8,085	1.99

Montana Auditor Election, 2008
Party	Candidate	Votes	%
Democratic	Monica Lindeen	246,522	53.50
Republican	Duane Grimes	214,241	46.50

Montana Auditor Election, 2012
Party	Candidate	Votes	%
Democratic	Monica Lindeen	248,447	53.52
Republican	Derek Skees	215,743	46.48

Political offices
Preceded by John Morrison	Auditor of Montana; 2009–2017	Succeeded by Matthew Rosendale
