= 2012 United States Senate election in Montana =

- November 6, 2012
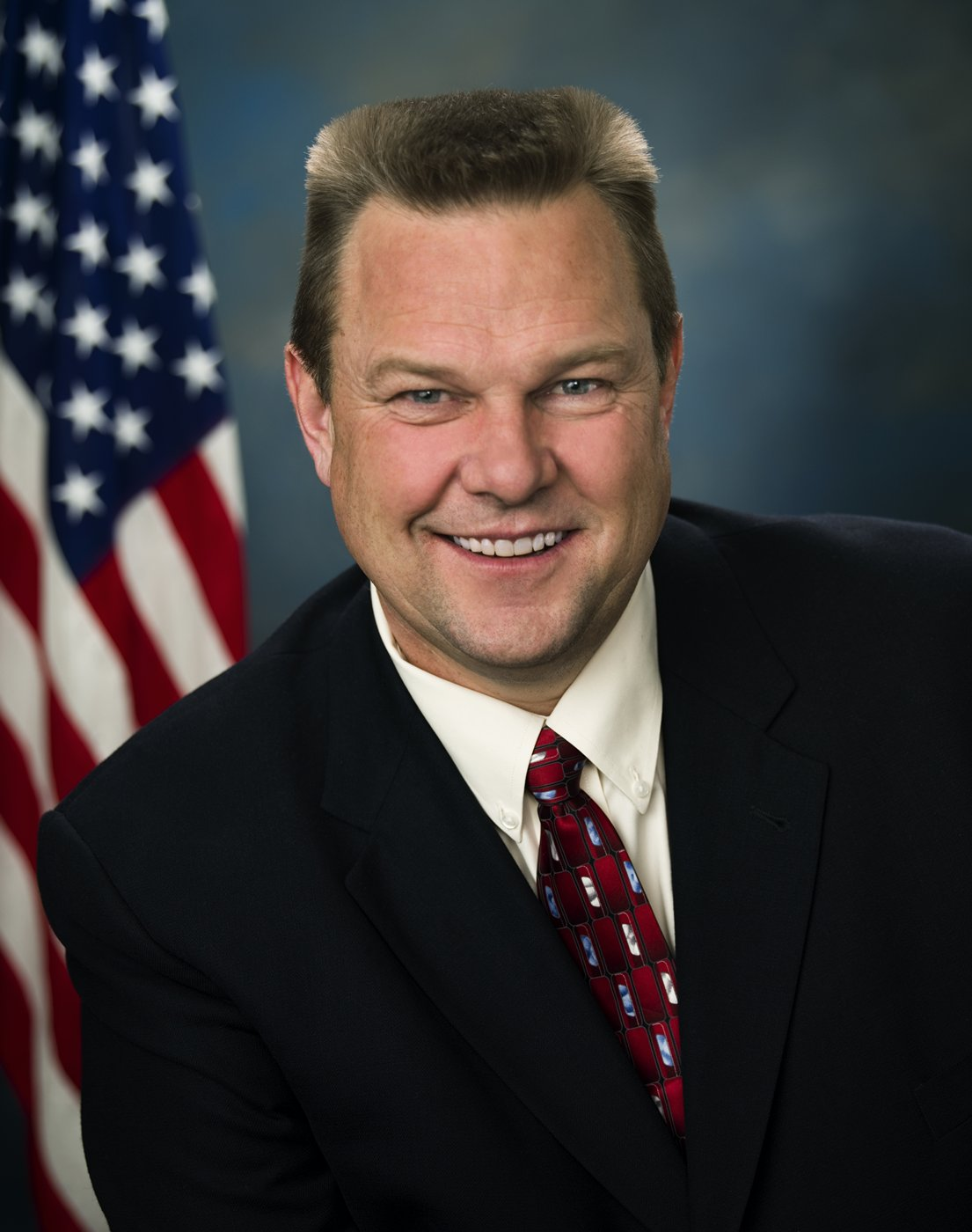

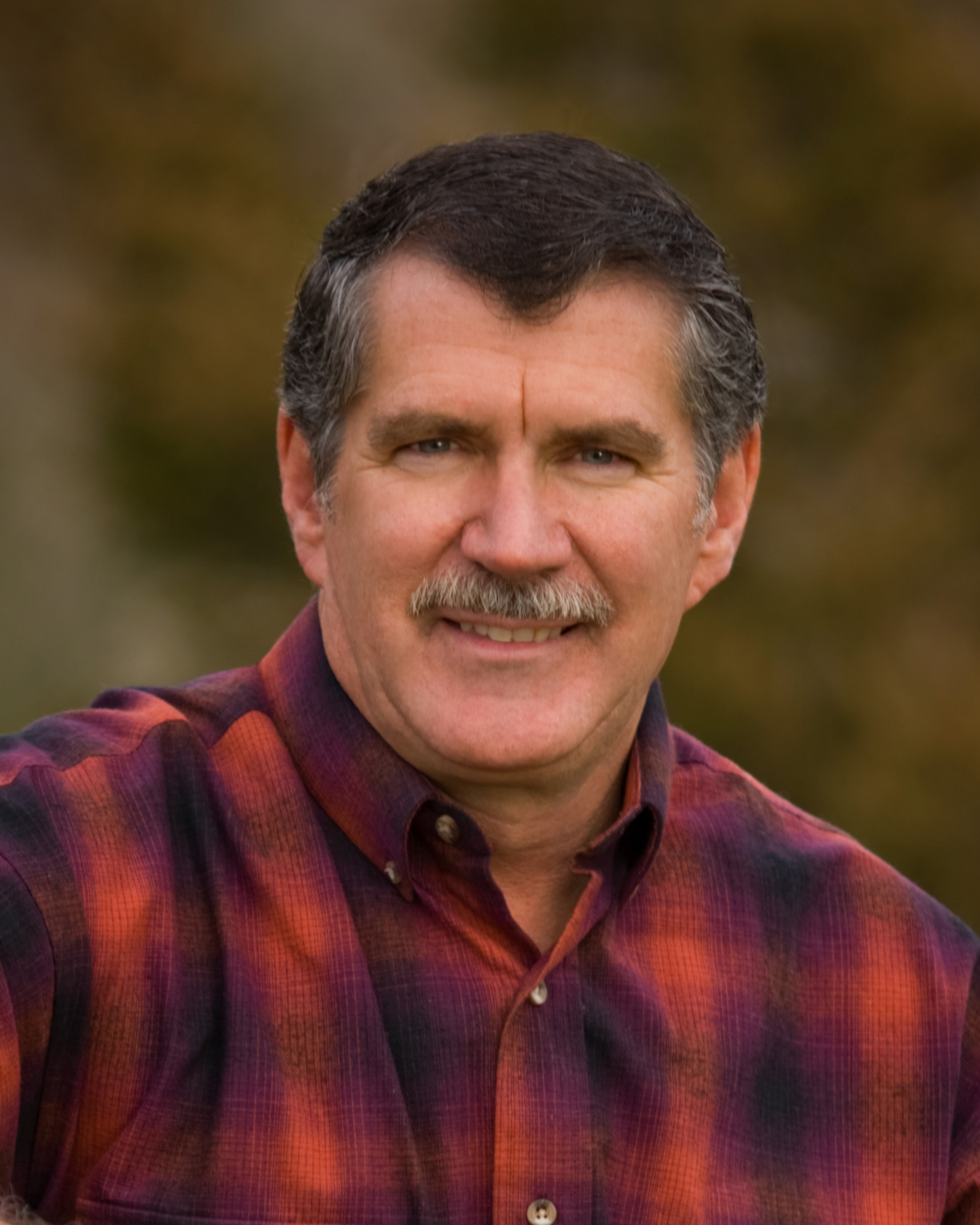

Nominee	Jon Tester	Denny Rehberg	Dan Cox
Party	Democratic	Republican	Libertarian
Popular vote	236,123	218,051	31,892
Percentage	48.58%	44.86%	6.56%
- County results Tester: 40–50% 50–60% 60–70% Rehberg: 40–50% 50–60% 60–70% 70–80%
U.S. senator before election
Jon Tester
Democratic
Elected U.S. Senator
Jon Tester
Democratic

The 2012 United States Senate election in Montana was held on November 6, 2012, alongside a presidential election, other elections to the United States Senate in other states, elections to the United States House of Representatives, and various state and local elections.

Incumbent Democratic Senator Jon Tester successfully ran for reelection to a second term, gaining 48.6% of the vote against Republican U.S. Representative Denny Rehberg, who received 44.9% of the vote, and Libertarian candidate Dan Cox, who received 6.56% of the vote.

== Democratic primary ==
=== Candidate ===
- Jon Tester, incumbent U.S. senator

== Republican primary ==
=== Candidates ===
- Denny Rehberg, U.S. representative, former lieutenant governor, former state representative and nominee in 1996
- Dennis Teske, farmer

=== Withdrew ===
- Steve Daines, businessman and 2008 Republican nominee for lieutenant governor of Montana (ran for the U.S. House of Representatives)

=== Endorsements ===
Denny Rehberg
- Conrad Burns, former U.S. senator from Montana

Organizations

- Gun Owners of America
- National Rifle Association of America

=== Results ===
The Republican primary was held on June 5, 2012.

U.S. Senate election in Montana Republican primary
Party	Candidate	Votes	%
Republican	Denny Rehberg	105,632	76.2
Republican	Dennis Teske	33,079	23.8
Total votes		138,711	100.0

== General election ==
=== Candidates ===
- Dan Cox (Libertarian), retired businessman
- Denny Rehberg (Republican), U.S. representative, former lieutenant governor and former state representative
- Jon Tester (Democratic), incumbent U.S. senator and former state senator

=== Debates ===
Three debates were scheduled, including one with the Libertarian candidate whose ultimate influence on the race remains uncertain. The first, between Rehberg and Tester, was held on October 8, 2012, at 7 p.m. at Petro Theatre at the MSU Billings University campus. The debate was televised live by Montana PBS andbroadcast on KEMC/Yellowstone Public Radio and streamed on the Gazette's website. It was moderated by Steve Prosinski, editor of The Gazette, with questions from a panel of political reporters. Representatives from the Associated Students of Montana State University Billings, the student government, served as timekeepers.

- Complete video of debate, October 8, 2012.
- Complete video of debate, October 20, 2012

=== Campaign ===
Former president of the Montana Senate and farmer Jon Tester was elected with 49.2% of the vote in 2006, defeating incumbent Conrad Burns.

As of June 30, 2011, Jon Tester had saved $2.34 million in campaign funds. Tester has been accused by Republican Denny Rehberg's senate campaign of depending on financial contributions from Wall Street banking executives and movie stars.

On February 5, 2011, U.S. Representative Denny Rehberg announced his intention to run for the U.S. Senate. Steve Daines had announced he would seek the Republican nomination on November 13, 2010, but just before Rehberg's announcement he dropped out of the primary and announced he would instead seek the Republican nomination for Montana's at-large congressional district in 2012. Daines later won Montana’s other U.S. Senate seat in 2014.

As of early July 2010, Denny Rehberg had saved $1.5 million of an original $2 million in campaign funds. Rehberg accused Democrat Jon Tester's senate campaign of depending on financial contributions from Wall Street banking executives and Hollywood while Rehberg's campaign relies primarily on in state donations. Tester's campaign countered that Rehberg has been funded by petroleum special interests and Wall Street.

The National Republican Senatorial Committee aired an attack ad against Jon Tester that mistakenly included a digitally manipulated photo of Tester (who has only two fingers on his left hand) with full sets of fingers. Another ad against Tester, from the Karl Rove group Crossroads GPS, falsely asserted that Tester had voted in favor of Environmental Protection Agency regulation of farm dust. In fact, Tester had praised the EPA for not attempting such a regulation. The vote cited in the anti-Tester ad concerned currency exchange rates.

In early October 2012, Crossroads GPS announced it would launch a $16 million advertising buy in national races, of which four were this and three other Senate elections.

Candidate (party)	Receipts	Disbursements	Cash on hand	Debt
Jon Tester (D)	$11,699,935	$10,377,126	$1,334,858	$0
Denny Rehberg (R)	$8,420,655	$7,249,285	$1,171,369	$0
Source: Federal Election Commission

==== Top contributors ====
- Although organizations are listed here, it is illegal for corporations to contribute to federal campaigns. Only political action committees (PACs) and individuals may contribute to federal candidates and in limited amounts. These lists actually indicate aggregate contributions from the organizations' PACs, their individual members or employees or owners, and those individuals' immediate families.

Jon Tester	Contribution	Denny Rehberg	Contribution
League of Conservation Voters	$82,332	Alliance Resource Partners	$36,500
Visa	$47,400	ExxonMobil	$29,500
JPMorgan Chase	$47,000	Las Vegas Sands	$25,000
Thornton & Naumes	$46,600	Mewbourne Oil Co	$25,000
WPP	$38,350	Murray Energy	$24,068
Blackstone	$34,000	Devon Energy	$20,400
Girardi & Keese	$30,000	Arch Coal	$19,000
Pederson Group	$29,500	Yellowstone Bank	$17,500
Comcast	$28,500	Marathon Oil	$13,750
First Interstate BancSystem	$28,400	Koch Industries	$13,500

==== Top industries ====
Jon Tester	Contribution	Denny Rehberg	Contribution
Lawyers/law firms	$1,084,445	Oil & gas	$327,969
Retired	$534,716	Financial institutions	$277,474
Lobbyists	$506,931	Retired	$268,693
Financial institutions	$438,763	Leadership PACs	$267,000
Leadership PACs	$345,750	Mining	$169,318
Commercial banks	$299,818	Lobbyists	$150,050
Real estate	$280,945	Real estate	$121,080
Insurance	$211,009	Misc. finance	$94,655
Misc. finance	$188,750	Lawyers/law firms	$89,338
Health professionals	$181,483	Republican/Conservative	$76,855

=== Predictions ===
Source	Ranking	As of
The Cook Political Report	Tossup	November 1, 2012
Sabato's Crystal Ball	Lean R (flip)	November 5, 2012
Rothenberg Political Report	Tossup	November 2, 2012
Real Clear Politics	Tossup	November 5, 2012

=== Polling ===
Poll source	Date(s) administered	Sample size	Margin of error	Jon Tester (D)	Denny Rehberg (R)	Other	Undecided
Public Policy Polling	November 10–13, 2010	1,176	±2.9%	46%	48%	—	6%
Mason-Dixon	March 14–16, 2011	625	±4.0%	46%	45%	—	9%
Public Policy Polling	June 16–19, 2011	819	±3.4%	45%	47%	—	8%
Public Policy Polling	November 28–30, 2011	1,625	±2.4%	45%	47%	4%	5%
Rasmussen Reports	February 22, 2012	500	±4.5%	44%	47%	6%	3%
Rasmussen Reports	April 2, 2012	500	±4.5%	44%	47%	—	9%
Public Policy Polling	April 26–29, 2012	934	±3.2%	48%	43%	9%	—
Rasmussen Reports	May 2, 2012	450	±5.0%	43%	53%	2%	2%
Rasmussen Reports	June 18, 2012	450	±5.0%	47%	49%	2%	2%
Rasmussen Reports	August 20, 2012	500	±4.5%	43%	47%	5%	5%
Public Policy Polling	September 10–11, 2012	656	±3.8%	45%	43%	8%	3%
Mason-Dixon	September 17–19, 2012	625	±4.0%	45%	48%	1%	6%
MSU	October 9, 2012	477	±4.6%	40%	43%	5%	12%
Public Policy Polling	October 8–10, 2012	737	±3.6%	45%	43%	8%	4%
Rasmussen Reports	October 14, 2012	500	±4.5%	48%	48%	3%	2%
Public Policy Polling/LCV	October 15–16, 2012	806	±3.5%	46%	44%	7%	3%
Pharos Research	October 19–21, 2012	828	±3.4%	48%	46%	—	5%
Pharos Research	October 26–28, 2012	799	±3.5%	48%	47%	—	5%
Rasmussen Reports	October 29, 2012	500	±4.5%	49%	48%	2%	2%
Mason-Dixon/Gazette State Bureau	October 29–31, 2012	625	4.0%	45%	49%	1%	5%
Public Policy Polling	November 2–3, 2012	836	3.4%	48%	46%	4%	2%

Hypothetical polling

Poll source	Date(s) administered	Sample size	Margin of error	Jon Tester (D)	Steve Daines (R)	Other	Undecided
Public Policy Polling	November 10–13, 2010	1,176	±2.9%	48%	37%	—	14%

Poll source	Date(s) administered	Sample size	Margin of error	Jon Tester (D)	Neil Livingstone (R)	Other	Undecided
Public Policy Polling	November 10–13, 2010	1,176	±2.9%	46%	35%	—	19%

Poll source	Date(s) administered	Sample size	Margin of error	Jon Tester (D)	Marc Racicot (R)	Other	Undecided
Public Policy Polling	November 10–13, 2010	1,176	±2.9%	42%	49%	—	9%

=== Results ===
Tester won re-election to a second term, albeit by a narrow margin. He received about 4% more of the vote than Republican Rehberg, but the difference in Tester and Rehberg's vote totals was less than the vote total of Libertarian Dan Cox, who received 6.6% of the vote.

United States Senate election in Montana, 2012
Party	Candidate	Votes	%	±%
Democratic	Jon Tester (incumbent)	236,123	48.58%	−0.58%
Republican	Denny Rehberg	218,051	44.86%	−3.43%
Libertarian	Dan Cox	31,892	6.56%	+4.01%
Total votes		486,066	100.00%	N/A
Democratic hold				

==== By county ====
County	Tester	Votes	Rehberg	Votes	Cox	Votes	Total
Beaverhead	31.84%	1,532	59.77%	2,876	8.4%	404	4,812
Big Horn	67.39%	3,141	28.08%	1,309	4.53%	211	4,661
Blaine	63.88%	1,834	31.24%	897	4.88%	140	2,871
Broadwater	33.01%	995	57.47%	1,732	9.52%	287	3,014
Carbon	45.9%	2,691	47.55%	2,788	6.55%	384	5,863
Carter	15.74%	125	77.58%	616	6.68%	53	794
Cascade	52.47%	18,246	41.96%	14,589	5.57%	1,936	34,771
Chouteau	48.19%	1,374	46.33%	1,321	5.47%	156	2,851
Custer	43.21%	2,283	49.31%	2,661	8.38%	452	5,396
Daniels	32.6%	327	60.52%	607	6.88%	69	1,003
Dawson	35.46%	1,571	56.52%	2,504	8.01%	355	4,430
Deer Lodge	69.55%	3,122	23.37%	1,049	7.08%	318	4,489
Fallon	29.78%	422	59.28%	840	10.94%	155	1,407
Fergus	33.94%	2,063	58.12%	3,533	7.95%	483	6,709
Flathead	37.17%	16,223	55.38%	24,171	7.45%	3,252	43,646
Gallatin	51.63%	24,781	42.47%	20,386	5.9%	2,834	48,001
Garfield	14.31%	101	79.04%	558	6.66%	47	708
Glacier	69.6%	3,118	24.84%	1,113	5.56%	249	4,480
Golden Valley	36.25%	174	57.5%	275	6.25%	30	480
Granite	38.53%	657	52.49%	895	8.97%	153	1,705
Hill	58.93%	4,060	34.27%	2,361	6.81%	469	6,890
Jefferson	40.92%	2,685	51.65%	3,389	7.42%	487	6,561
Judith Basin	35.94%	441	57.13%	701	6.93%	85	1,227
Lake	49.25%	6,561	42.92%	5,717	7.83%	1,043	13,321
Lewis and Clark	54.34%	18,189	40.17%	13,446	5.49%	1,839	33,474
Liberty	40.48%	1,341	53.12%	1,760	6.09%	61	1,002
Lincoln	34.62%	3,091	56.90%	5,080	8.48%	757	8,928
Madison	33.2%	1,516	58.91%	2,690	7.88%	360	4,566
McCone	32.9%	332	61.05%	616	6.05%	61	1,009
Meagher	34.93%	342	55.57%	544	9.5%	93	979
Mineral	42.66%	866	47.44%	963	9.9%	201	2,030
Missoula	63.49%	36,488	31.64%	18,184	4.87%	2,799	57,471
Musselshell	28.58%	684	61.14%	1,463	10.28%	246	2,393
Park	48.22%	4,260	43.94%	3,882	7.84%	693	8,835
Petroleum	24.41%	73	67.56%	202	8.03%	24	299
Phillips	27.2%	607	65.64%	1,465	7.17%	160	2,232
Pondera	43.53%	1,187	49.69%	1,355	6.78%	185	2,727
Powder River	23.32%	239	70.15%	719	6.54%	67	1,025
Powell	41.75%	1,167	51.2%	1,431	7.05%	197	2,795
Prairie	33.33%	236	59.32%	420	7.34%	52	708
Ravalli	38.65%	8,602	53.87%	11,990	7.48%	1,666	22,258
Richland	30.18%	1,406	62.95%	2,933	6.87%	320	4,659
Roosevelt	61.41%	2,269	33.42%	1,235	5.17%	191	3,695
Rosebud	48.0%	1,704	44.45%	1,578	7.55%	268	3,550
Sanders	34.31%	2,044	54.04%	3,219	11.65%	694	5,957
Sheridan	42.23%	812	51.74%	995	6.03%	116	1,923
Silver Bow	69.29%	11,673	24.62%	4,148	6.09%	1,026	16,847
Stillwater	36.66%	1,732	56.84%	2,684	6.52%	308	4,724
Sweet Grass	31.19%	661	62.67%	1,328	6.13%	130	2,119
Teton	40.48%	1,341	53.12%	1,760	6.4%	212	3,313
Toole	34.01%	721	57.03%	1,209	8.96%	190	2,120
Treasure	33.98%	157	54.55%	252	11.47%	53	462
Valley	44.98%	1,749	46.91%	1,824	8.1%	315	3,888
Wheatland	36.79%	365	56.35%	559	6.85%	68	992
Wibaux	27.39%	149	62.32%	339	10.29%	56	544
Yellowstone	47.15%	32,565	46.44%	32,077	6.42%	4,432	69,074

Counties that flipped from Republican to Democratic

- Chouteau (largest municipality: Fort Benton)
- Gallatin (largest city: Bozeman)
- Yellowstone (largest municipality: Billings)

Counties that flipped from Democratic to Republican

- Mineral (largest city: Superior)
- Sheridan (largest city: Plentywood)

== See also ==
- 2012 United States Senate elections
- 2012 United States House of Representatives election in Montana
- 2012 Montana gubernatorial election
