= Mike Fellows (politician) =

American politician (1957–2016)

Personal details
- Born: Michael Charles Fellows; December 8, 1957 Lewiston, Idaho, U.S.
- Died: September 19, 2016 (aged 58) Missoula County, Montana, U.S.
- Cause of death: Traffic collision
- Party: Libertarian
- Occupation: Activist, politician

Michael Charles Fellows (December 8, 1957 – September 19, 2016) was an American political activist and Army reservist. He was also a state coordinator for the Montana Fully Informed Jury Association. In the 1990s he issued a press release calling for the impeachment of Bill Clinton. Fellows made political history in 2012 by becoming the first Libertarian candidate ever to gather more than 40% of the vote in a partisan statewide race.

== Political ==
Fellows was the state chair of the Montana Libertarian Party. He had an involvement with the party that went back to 1988. In 1998 he was in the race for Montana's lone U.S. house seat with Democrat Robert "Dusty" Deschamps, Reform Party candidate Webb Sullivan and Republican freshman Rick Hill with Hill ending up the winner. In 2006 he was in the race, running against Republican Denny Rehberg and Democrat Monica Lindeen.

In 2012, he secured a place for himself in political history by becoming the first Libertarian Party candidate to achieve passing the 40 percent vote mark in a partisan statewide race. He actually got 43 percent which amounted to 185,419 votes. This carried 27 of Montana's 56 counties in a two-way race for the Supreme Court clerk. The race was against incumbent Democrat Ed Smith, who narrowly won.

In November 2014 he was in the race for Montana's U.S. House seat. He ran against Democrat John Lewis and Republican Ryan Zinke. The three reasons he gave for running were to try to protect Second Amendment gun rights, balance the federal budget and reduction of the federal debt. He pulled 10,654 votes but Republican Zinke won.

He was referred to in the Choteau Acantha by Dylan Chaffin as the real-life political version of the Energizer Bunny. He was also referred to in the Bozeman Daily Chronicle as "Montana's 'godfather of third-party politics'".

== Political views and stances ==
Fellows advocated for the repeal of the 2001 Patriot Act, which was passed by the government in the wake of 9/11. He was critical of the law for violating constitutional provisions, pointing out unreasonable searches and seizures. In an article in the Sidney Herald, he was said to be about is all about the expansion of civil liberties the minimization of government. He was about allowing people to do what they wanted as long as they didn't infringe on the rights of others.

Fellows was opposed to sending more ground troops to the Middle East. He once commented, ... "We're just going to keep at this thing, losing lives and spending money."

On abortion, Fellows stated that while he was personally opposed to it, libertarians do not believe the government should be involved in such matters.

About a bill that would banish third parties from the ballot, Fellows suggested that Republicans didn't believe in free market as they were trying to use the forces of government to their ends.

== Other organizations ==
In addition to the Montana Fully Informed Jury Association, Fellows was a trustee for American Legion Post 27 and on the board of Missoula Community Access Television.

== Accident and death ==
Fellows died at the age of 58 in a car crash near Potomac in Missoula County, Montana, on September 19, 2016, following a campaign event in Seeley Lake. Fellows was involved in a head-on automobile accident on Highway 200. He died at the accident scene. According to an investigation, Fellows had been traveling west while returning from Seeley Lake where he had attended a campaign function. Apparently the Lexus that Fellows was driving had crossed the center line.
