= Denny Rehberg =

American politician (born 1955)

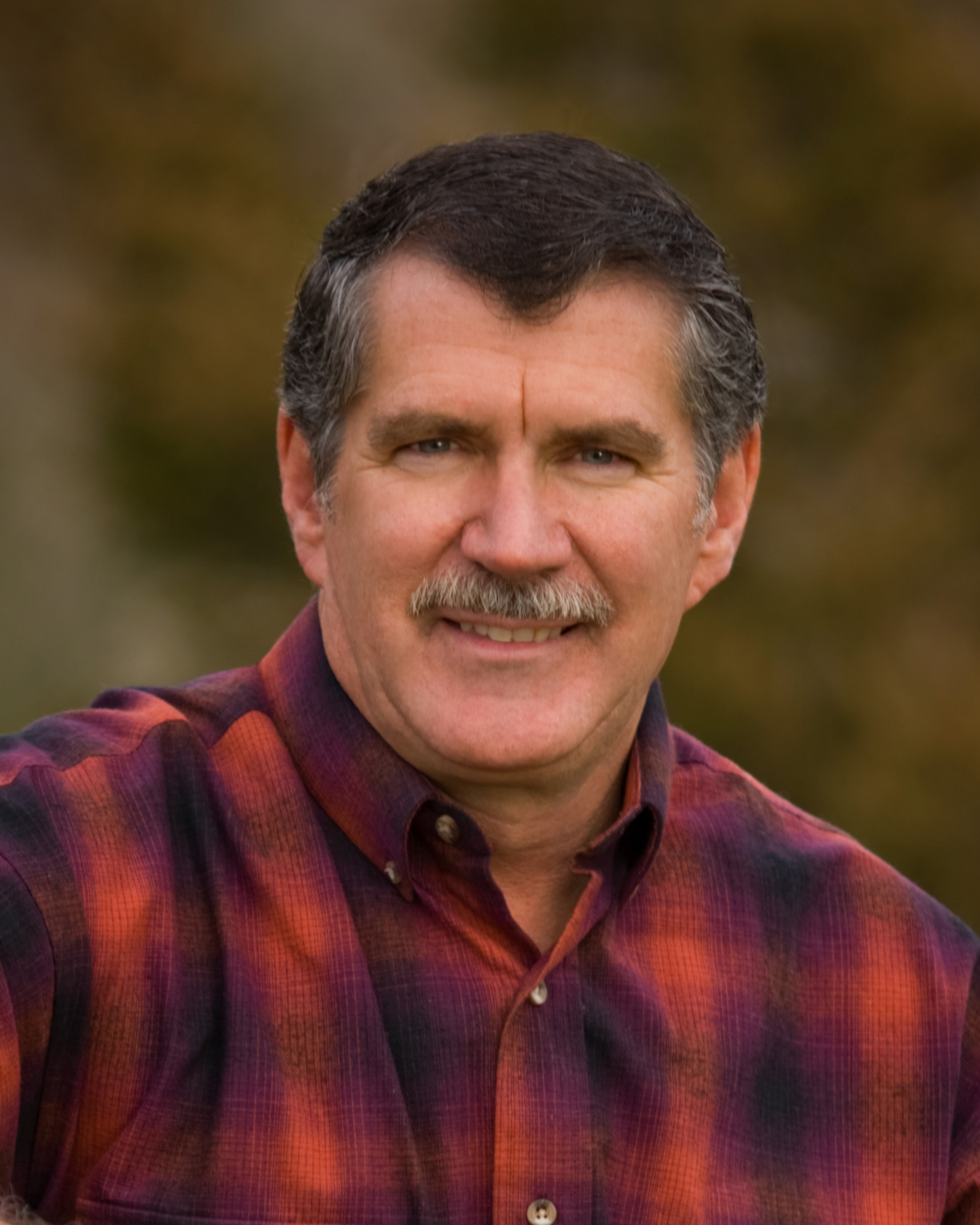
- Official portrait, 2008

Member of the U.S. House of Representatives from Montana's at-large district
- In office January 3, 2001 – January 3, 2013
- Preceded by: Rick Hill
- Succeeded by: Steve Daines

30th Lieutenant Governor of Montana
- In office January 20, 1991 – January 6, 1997
- Governor: Stan Stephens; Marc Racicot
- Preceded by: Allen Kolstad
- Succeeded by: Judy Martz

Member of the Montana House of Representatives from the 88th district
- In office January 1985 – January 7, 1991
- Preceded by: Harrison Fagg
- Succeeded by: Royal Johnson

Personal details
- Born: Dennis Ray Rehberg; October 5, 1955 (age 71) Billings, Montana, U.S.
- Party: Republican
- Spouse: Jan Rehberg (m. 1988)
- Children: 3
- Education: Montana State University; Washington State University (BA)

Dennis Ray Rehberg (born October 5, 1955) is an American rancher, cattle and cashmere farmer, and retired Republican politician. He served as the lieutenant governor of Montana from 1991 to 1997 and as the U.S. representative for Montana's at-large congressional district from 2001 to 2013. Rehberg was the Republican nominee for the United States Senate in 1996 and 2012, losing to Democratic incumbents Max Baucus 50% to 45% and Jon Tester 49% to 45%, respectively. He subsequently became a co-chairman at Mercury, a Washington D.C. lobbying firm. In 2024, Rehberg ran for Congress in Montana's 2nd congressional district, but was defeated in the Republican primary.

== Early life, education, and ranching career ==
Rehberg was born in Billings, Montana, the son of Patricia Rae (née Cooley) and Jack Dennis Rehberg. His ancestry includes German, Irish, and Scottish. He attended Billings West High School and Montana State University before transferring to Washington State University where he earned his Bachelor of Arts in public administration.

From 1996 to 2001, Rehberg managed the Rehberg Ranch near Billings. He oversaw a herd of 500 cattle and 600 cashmere goats. After being elected to Congress, Rehberg gave up ranching, citing the difficulty of managing a herd whilst travelling between Montana and Washington D.C.

== Early political career ==
=== Staffer ===
In 1977 he began working as an intern in the Montana State Senate, and two years later he joined the Washington, D.C. staff of Montana U.S. Congressman Ron Marlenee as a legislative assistant. In 1982, Rehberg returned to farming, until running for the State House in 1984.

=== Montana legislature ===
Rehberg was elected then to the Montana State House of Representatives from 1985 to 1991, where he served three terms for the 88th district. He defeated eight term incumbent Harrison Fagg in the Republican primary. In the legislature, he considered himself to be a fiscal conservative, and he advocated balancing the state budget without any tax increases. He was the only freshman member to serve on the House Appropriations Committee. He declined to run for a fourth term to his state legislative seat in 1990. He was succeeded by Royal C. Johnson in the State House.

=== Lieutenant governor ===
In July 1991, Rehberg was appointed lieutenant governor by Governor Stan Stephens. He was subsequently elected to a full term in 1992.

As lieutenant governor, Rehberg sought to bring government back to the local level by traveling to all 56 counties every year. He chaired the Drought Advisory Committee and the Task Force credited with reforming Worker's Compensation, the Montana Rural Development Council, and several health care initiatives. Rehberg stepped down from his post to run for U.S. Senate. He was succeeded as lieutenant governor by fellow Republican Judy Martz.

=== 1996 U.S. Senate election ===
He ran for a seat in the United States Senate against incumbent Democratic U.S. Senator Max Baucus, but lost, 50% to 45%.

== U.S. House of Representatives ==
=== Elections ===
2000

Incumbent Republican U.S. Congressman Rick Hill of Montana's at-large congressional district decided to retire after two terms in 2000. Rehberg decided to run and won the Republican primary with 74% of the vote. In the general election, he defeated Democratic State School Superintendent Nancy Keenan 52%–46%.

2002

He won re-election to a second term with 65%, against Steven Dickman Kelly.

2004

He won re-election against Tracy Velazquez to a third term with 64%.

2006

He won re-election to a fourth term against Democratic state representative Monica Lindeen 59%–39%.

2008

He won re-election to a fifth term against Democratic state representative John Driscoll 64%–32%.

2010

He won re-election to a sixth term against Democrat Dennis McDonald 60%–33%.He is the longest serving representative from Montana's at-large district.

=== Tenure ===
National Security and Federal Lands Protection Act (H.R. 1505)

In 2012 Rehberg co-sponsored H.R. 1505, which would waive environmental laws that would otherwise prevent the Department of Homeland Security from constructing roads, fences, and forward operating bases in national parks and wilderness areas within 100 miles of the international border. Homeland Security would not have to inform affected parties before pursuing these activities. The bill's dissenters claim that it "employs a manufactured conflict with border security to weaken [environmental laws]." The Department of Homeland Security called the bill "unnecessary and bad policy" since DHS already has a memorandum of understanding allowing them to enter these lands without prior approval.

Economic record

On April 15, 2011, Rehberg was one of four Republican members of Congress to vote against The Path to Prosperity.

Pell grants and school lunches

After having scrutinized the Pell Grant program as one that was 'expanding' too quickly, congressman Rehberg set his sights on the free school lunch program as a program where there was potential of taxpayers being ripped off, although the state Superintendent of Public Instruction Denise Juneau expressed the real concern that not enough families that qualify request the assistance.

Iraq War

Rehberg voted for the Authorization for Use of Military Force Against Iraq Resolution of 2002.

Rehberg served on the Military Quality of Life and Foreign Operations Subcommittees of the powerful House Committee on Appropriations. In 2007, he voted against the Mandatory Troop Rest Periods between Deployments to Iraq bill (creates a mandatory rest period between deployments to Iraq for members of the Armed Forces, passed) and against the Redeployment from Iraq Act (reduces the presence of the U.S. armed forces in Iraq by April 1, 2008, passed).

Environmental record

Rehberg describes himself as "a lifelong steward of the land". He voted against the Renewable Energy and Energy Conservation Tax Act of 2007 and against the Securing America's Future Energy (SAFE) Act of 2001. He is currently one of the foremost critics on keeping the gray wolf on the endangered species list. On environmental issues, Rehberg has also been given low ratings by interest groups. Environment America gave him an 8% rating in 2008, and 27% rating in 2009. Defenders of Wildlife Action Fund gave him a 13% rating. In his position statement on Economic Development, he said "Our [Montana's] coal and natural gas reserves stretch for hundreds of years into the future, and we can turn them into much needed energy." Dennis Rehberg states opposition to the Shays-Meehan bill from 1998, of which he says it "stripped freedom of speech rights from Montana citizens." Aside from the bill, he makes a point to say he supports full and open disclosure laws for campaign finance reform.

LGBT issues

Rehberg opposes same-sex marriage, and supports a constitutional amendment defining marriage as between one man and one woman. He voted against the Local Law Enforcement Hate Crimes Prevention Act of 2007, a bill that amends the Federal definition of a hate crime to include gender identity and sexual orientation. The bill passed, 237 to 180. In the December 26, 1994, issue of Newsweek, p. 83, then lieutenant governor Rehberg was quoted as saying, "The problem with AIDS is: you got it, you die. So why are we spending money on the issue?" when discussing cuts to the state's hospital budget.

=== Committee assignments ===
112th Congress (2011–2012)

- Committee on Appropriations

111th Congress (2009–2010)

- Committee on Appropriations
  - Subcommittee on Energy and Water Development
  - Subcommittee on Labor, Health and Human Services, Education, and Related Agencies (chairman)
  - Subcommittee on the Legislative Branch

110th Congress (2007–2008)

- House Committee on Appropriations
  - Subcommittee on House Committee on House Committee on Financial Services and General Government
  - Subcommittee on Labor, Health and Human Services, and Education

109th Congress (2005–2006)

- House Committee on Appropriations
  - Subcommittee on Energy and Water Development and Related Agencies -
  - Subcommittee on Foreign Operations Export Financing and Related Programs
  - Subcommittee on Military Quality of Life and Veterans Affairs and Related Agencies

=== Caucus memberships ===
- Congressional Rural Caucus
- Co-chair, Small Brewers Caucus
- Co-chair, Congressional Baby Caucus
- Co-chair, Northern Border Caucus
- Former Chair, Drought Advisory Committee
- Firefighter Caucus
- Forest Caucus
- House Vice Chair, Lewis and Clark Bicentennial Congressional Caucus
- Liberty Caucus
- Northwest Energy Caucus
- Republican Study Committee
- Tea Party Caucus
- Sportsmen's Caucus
- Western Caucus
- International Conservation Caucus

== 2012 U.S. Senate election ==
On February 6, 2011, Rehberg announced that he would challenge Senator Jon Tester (D-MT) in 2012. The outcome of the race was expected to have a significant impact on which party controlled the United States Senate during the 113th Congress.

According to Salon, it was a "race that pundits are saying could be a tough challenge for Tester." Political scientist Larry Sabato predicted a narrow Rehberg victory, pointing out that Rehberg had led in 10 of 13 recent polls. However, Tester eventually defeated Rehberg, 48.7% to 44.8%.

=== 2014 U.S. House election ===
When after one term in the U.S. House Steve Daines ran for the U.S. Senate, Rehberg considered running for his old House seat, but ultimately declined. The seat was ultimately won by Republican Ryan Zinke.

=== 2024 U.S. House election ===
Rehberg ran in 2024 in the primary for Montana's 2nd congressional district, which was held by Representative Matt Rosendale. Rehberg was criticized by foreign policy experts and human rights activists over the fact that he previously lobbied as a registered foreign agent at the firm Mercury Public Affairs for Hikvision, a Chinese state-owned video surveillance company that was sanctioned by the U.S. government for aiding China's government in the detainment and surveillance of Uyghur Muslims in the Xinjiang Autonomous Region in China

Rehberg lobbied for Hikvision against U.S. sanctions while working at Mercury, though claimed to the Washington Examiner in May 2024 that he "has no knowledge or idea of what happened” in China with Hikvision, seeking to distance himself from the company's activities. Rushan Abbas, a Uyghur American activist and advocate from the Xinjiang Autonomous Region in China, said it's “extremely disappointing” Rehberg prioritized “profit from China’s blood money over human rights and human dignity."

== Personal life ==
Rehberg married his high school sweetheart, Jan, a water attorney who represents farmers and ranchers. They have been married for over 25 years and have three children, A.J., Katie, and Elsie. He is an Episcopalian.

=== Wealth ===
With a net worth of between $6.5 and $54 million, Rehberg was the fourteenth-richest U.S. Representative in the House in 2008. In an April 2011 town hall meeting video released by the Montana Democratic Party, he told an audience member that he was "land-rich and cash-poor" and "struggling like everyone else."

=== Boating crash ===
On the night of Thursday, August 27, 2009, while in the area for a series of town hall forums on healthcare, Rehberg was a passenger in a boating accident near Bigfork, Montana on Flathead Lake. Montana State Senate Majority Whip Greg Barkus was driving the boat.

Rehberg, Barkus and his wife Kathy, and two Rehberg aides, Dustin Frost and Kristin Smith, were hospitalized in Kalispell following the accident, which took place sometime between 10pm and midnight. Frost, Rehberg's then 27-year-old state director in Montana, suffered a brain injury. Frost was in a coma for more than a week. Rehberg sustained a broken ankle and rib fractures.

Law enforcement agents investigated the cause of the accident, including "how fast the boat was going, who was driving, and 'whether alcohol and drugs were involved.'" Barkus "was found to have a blood alcohol content of .16 two hours after the accident. Despite the fact that, according to a witness quoted in the criminal complaint, Barkus had been drinking scotch and wine at a lakeside restaurant that night, Rehberg later said he 'was surprised to learn the results of Greg's blood alcohol test'." Rehberg released his BAC, measured several hours after the crash, at an alleged 0.05 percent.

Barkus, who had other driving violations and previously had plea bargained a DUI case down, ultimately pleaded no contest to a felony criminal endangerment charge. He was given a four-year deferred sentence, probation, paid $4,000 in restitution and a $25,000 fine.

=== Lawsuit against the City of Billings ===
In July 2010, Rehberg's corporation that has developed a subdivision on his former ranch land sued the City of Billings for calling back firefighters from protecting trees and some scrub brush. The City of Billings had recently annexed a significant amount of undeveloped grass-land, including Rehberg's ranch, and had not developed a firefighting policy for wildfires, which are significantly different from structure fires. When the fire flared again, the city firefighters had to return to put out the fire after significant damage was done. While the suit was filed in July, Rehberg and his wife did not push forward with litigation, given the political pressures of the 2010 Congressional campaign.

The city of Billings spent nearly $21,000 defending itself against the lawsuit before it was dropped by Rehberg.

=== Memberships ===
- Member, Billings Chamber of Commerce
- Member, Billings Downtown Rotary Club
- Former Chair, Montana Rural Development Council
- Member, Montana Stockgrowers Association
- State Chair, Muscular Dystrophy Association
- National Guard and Reserve Components Congressional Members Organization.

== Electoral history ==
Montana's at-large congressional district: Results 2000–2010
Year	Republican	Votes	Pct	Democratic	Votes	Pct	Libertarian	Votes	Pct
2000	Denny Rehberg	211,418	51.5%	Nancy Keenan	180,971	44.1%	James J. Tikalsky	9,132	2.2%
2002	Denny Rehberg (inc.)	214,100	64.6%	Steve Kelly	108,233	32.7%	Mike Fellows	8,988	2.7%
2004	Denny Rehberg (inc.)	286,076	64.4%	Tracy Velazquez	145,606	32.8%	Mike Fellows	12,458	2.8%
2006	Denny Rehberg (inc.)	239,124	58.9%	Monica Lindeen	158,916	39.1%	Mike Fellows	8,085	2%
2008	Denny Rehberg (inc.)	307,132	64.2%	John Driscoll	154,713	32.4%	Mike Fellows	16,282	3.4%
2010	Denny Rehberg (inc.)	217,696	60.4%	Dennis McDonald	121,954	33.8%	Mike Fellows	20,691	7.9%

Political offices
Preceded by Allen Kolstad	Lieutenant Governor of Montana; 1991–1997	Succeeded by Judy Martz
U.S. House of Representatives
Preceded by Rick Hill	Member of the U.S. House of Representatives from Montana's at-large congressional district 2001–2013	Succeeded by Steve Daines
Party political offices
Preceded by Allen Kolstad	Republican nominee for U.S. Senator from Montana (Class 2); 1996	Succeeded by Mike Taylor
Preceded by Conrad Burns	Republican nominee for U.S. Senator from Montana (Class 1); 2012	Succeeded by Matt Rosendale
U.S. order of precedence (ceremonial)
Preceded by Scott McInnis as Former U.S. Representative	Order of precedence of the United States as Former U.S. Representative	Succeeded by Brian Baird as Former U.S. Representative
