= List of Montana state representatives =

Montana House of Representatives
- Montana State Legislature

Type
- Type: Lower house
- Term limits: 4 terms (8 years)

History
- New session started: January 4, 2021

Leadership
- Speaker of the House: Wylie Galt (R) since January 4, 2021
- Speaker pro Tempore: Casey Knudsen (R) since January 4, 2021
- Majority Leader: Sue Vinton (R) since January 4, 2021
- Minority Leader: Kim Abbott (D) since January 4, 2021

Structure
- Seats: 100
- Political groups: Republican Party (67); Democratic Party (33)
- Length of term: 2 years
- Authority: Article V, Montana Constitution
- Salary: $82.64/day + per diem

Elections
- Last election: November 3, 2020 (100 seats)
- Next election: November 8, 2022 (100 seats)
- Redistricting: Montana Districting and Apportionment Commission

Meeting place
- House of Representatives Chamber; Montana State Capitol; Helena, Montana

Website
- Montana House of Representatives

The Montana State Legislature is the state legislature of the U.S. state of Montana. It is composed of the 100-member Montana House of Representatives and the 50-member Montana Senate.

The representatives are distributed as follows:

- Republican Party: 58 seats
- Democratic Party: 42 seats

== List of members by name ==
This is a list of current and former notable members of the Montana House of Representatives by last name.

- Forrest H. Anderson
- LeRoy H. Anderson
- Duane Ankney
- J. Hugo Aronson
- Shannon Augare
- Tim M. Babcock
- Thomas C. Bach
- Joe Balyeat
- Liz Bangerter
- Debby Barrett
- James F. Battin
- Max Baucus
- Arlene Becker
- Bryce Bennett
- Gerald Bennett - District 1
- Bob Bergren
- Norma Bixby
- Mark Blasdel
- Anders Blewett
- John Bohlinger
- Carlie Boland
- Steve Bolstad
- Dorothy Bradley
- Gary Branae
- Bob Brown
- Dee L. Brown
- Roy Brown
- Walter A. Burleigh
- Mary Caferro
- Tim Callahan
- Albert J. Campbell
- Margarett Campbell
- Christy Clark
- Vicki Cocchiarella
- Jill Cohenour
- Mike Cooney
- Douglas Cordier
- Wesley A. D'Ewart
- Steve Daines
- Sue Dickenson
- Robyn Driscoll
- E. Jocob Crull
- Bob Ebinger
- Zales Ecton
- Caldwell Edwards
- Jim Elliott
- Ron Erickson
- Tom Facey
- Steve Fitzpatrick
- Orvin B. Fjare
- Henry Frank
- Eve Franklin
- Julie French
- Kevin Furey
- Dave Gallik
- Steve Gallus
- Kim Gillan
- Wanda Grinde
- George Groesback
- Steve Gunderson - District 1
- Alan Hale
- Robin Hamilton
- Betsy Hands
- Dan Harrington
- Ralph Heinert
- Teresa Henry
- Frank G. Higgins
- Cynthia Hiner
- Galen Hollenbaugh
- Elmer Holt
- Hal Jacobson
- Joey Jayne
- Larry Jent
- Llew Jones
- Mike Jopek
- Rick Jore
- Thomas Lee Judge
- Carol Juneau
- Christine Kaufmann
- Jim Keane
- Nancy Keenan
- Daniel Kemmis
- Allen Kolstad
- Deborah Kottel
- Bob Lake
- Jesse Laslovich
- Ralph Lenhart
- Dave Lewis
- Greg Lind
- Monica Lindeen
- Frank Bird Linderman
- Dave McAlpin
- Bill McChesney
- Washington J. McCormick
- Gary Matthews
- John Melcher
- Lee Metcalf
- Mike Milburn
- Terry Murphy
- John Musgrove
- Art Noonan
- James F. O'Connor
- Mark O'Keefe
- Alan Olson
- John Parker
- Gerald Pease
- François Jean Pelletier
- Arthur L. Peterson
- Ken Peterson
- Mike Phillips
- Jennifer Pomnichowski
- Debo Powers
- Jean Price
- Holly Raser
- Joe Read
- Michele Reinhart
- James A. Rice
- Rick Ripley
- Scott Sales
- Sarah Laszloffy
- Diane Sands
- Jon Sesso
- Jim Shockley
- John Sinrud
- Paul Sliter
- Veronica Small-Eastman
- Frank Smith
- Jon Sonju
- Carolyn Squires
- Donald Steinbeisser
- Sam V. Stewart
- Tom Stout
- Janna Taylor
- Bill Thomas
- Fred A. Thomas
- Joseph Tropila
- Brad Tschida
- George Turman
- Gordon Vance
- Kendall Van Dyk
- Dan Villa
- Frank Comerford Walker
- David Wanzenried
- Wendy Warburton
- Ted Washburn
- Jeffrey Welborn
- Burton K. Wheeler
- Benjamin F. White
- Kerry White
- Lea Whitford
- Carol Williams
- Franke Wilmer
- Bill Wilson
- Jonathan Windy Boy
- Brady Wiseman
- Tom Woods
- Max Yates
- Daniel Zolnikov

== List of members by districts ==
This is a list of current and former notable members of the Montana House of Representatives by term, name, and party.

=== District 1 ===
Term (start)	Term (end)	Representative Name	Party	Notes
2003	2005	Carol Lambert	Republican	
2005	2008	Ralph Heinert	Republican	
2009	2016	Gerald Bennett	Republican	Serving as County Commissioner of Lincoln County
2017	present	Steve Gunderson	Republican	

=== District 2 ===
Term (start)	Term (end)	Representative Name	Party	Notes
2003	2004	Ralph Lenhart	Democrat	
2005	2006	Rick Maedje	Republican	
2007	2010	Chas Vincent	Republican	Also served as a Montana state senator
2011	2018	Mike Cuffe	Republican	Also served as a Montana state senator
2019	present	Neil Duram	Republican	

=== District 3 ===
Term (start)	Term (end)	Representative Name	Party	Notes
2003	2004	Ronald Devlin	Democrat	
2005	2006	Dee Brown	Democrat	
2007	2008	Douglas Cordier	Democrat	
2009	2010	Dee Brown	Republican	
2011	2014	Jerry O'Neil	Republican	Also served as a Montana state senator
2015	2019	Zac Perry	Democrat	Resigned in 2019
2019	present	Debo Powers	Democrat	Appointed in October 2019.

=== District 4 ===
Term (start)	Term (end)	Representative Name	Party	Notes
2004	2010	Mike Jopek	Democratic	
2011	2012	Derek Skees	Republican	
2013	2014	Ed Lieser	Democratic	
2015	2016	Keith Regier	Republican	
2017	2025	Matt Regier	Republican	
2025	present	Lyn Bennett	Republican	

=== District 5 ===
Term (start)	Term (end)	Representative Name	Party	Notes
2005	2006	Norma Bixby	Democratic	
2007	2008	George Everett	Republican	
2009	2013	Keith Regier	Republican	
2015	2016	Ed Lieser	Democratic	
2017	present	Dave Fern	Democratic	

=== District 6 ===
Term (start)	Term (end)	Representative Name	Party	Notes
2003	2004	Veronica Small-Eastman	Democratic	
2005	2006	Verdell Jackson	Republican	Also served as a Montana state senator
2007	2012	William Beck Sr.	Republican	
2013	present	Carl Glimm	Republican	

=== District 7 ===
Term (start)	Term (end)	Representative Name	Party	Notes
1999	2004	Monica Lindeen	Democratic	
2005	2010	Jon Sonju	Republican	
2013	2014	Randy Brodehl	Republican	
2015	present	Frank Garner	Republican	

=== District 8 ===
Term (start)	Term (end)	Representative Name	Party	Notes
2009	2010	Cheryl Steenson	Democratic	
2011	2019	Steve Lavin	Republican	
2019	present	John Fuller	Republican	

=== District 9 ===
Term (start)	Term (end)	Representative Name	Party	Notes
2005	2008	William J. Jones	Republican	
2009	2014	Scott Reichner	Republican	
2015	2018	Randy Brodehl	Republican	
2019	present	David Dunn	Republican	

=== District 10 ===
Term (start)	Term (end)	Representative Name	Party	Notes
2003	2004	Donald Roberts	Republican	
2005	2006	Bernie Olson	Republican	
2007	2015	Mark Blasdel	Republican	
2015	present	Mark Noland	Republican	

=== District 11 ===
Term (start)	Term (end)	Representative Name	Party	Notes
1997	2004	Kim Gillan	Democratic	
2005	2012	Janna Taylor	Republican	
2013	2014	Greg Hertz	Republican	
2015	2016	Albert Olszewski	Republican	
2017	present	Derek Skees	Republican	

=== District 12 ===
Term (start)	Term (end)	Representative Name	Party	Notes
2009	2010	John Fleming	Democratic	
2011	2014	Daniel Salomon	Republican	
2015	present	Greg Hertz	Republican	

=== District 13 ===
Term (start)	Term (end)	Representative Name	Party	Notes
2005	2006	Paul Clark	Democratic	
2007	2014	Pat Ingraham	Republican	
2015	present	Bob Brown	Republican	

== See also ==
- List of people from Montana
- List of Montana state senators
