= List of Montana state senators =

Montana State Senate
- Montana State Legislature

Type
- Type: Upper house
- Term limits: 2 terms (8 years)

History
- New session started: January 2021

Leadership
- President of the Senate: Scott Sales (R) since January 2, 2017
- President pro Tempore: Mark Blasdel (R) since January 7, 2019
- Majority Leader: Fred Thomas (R) since January 2, 2017
- Minority Leader: Jon Sesso (D) since January 5, 2015

Structure
- Seats: 50
- Political groups: Republican Party (30); Democratic Party (20)
- Length of term: 4 years
- Authority: Article V, Section 2, Montana Constitution
- Salary: $92.46/day + per diem

Elections
- Last election: November 6, 2018 (25 seats)
- Next election: November 3, 2020 (25 seats)
- Redistricting: Montana Districting and Apportionment Commission

Meeting place
- Senate Chamber; Montana State Capitol; Helena, Montana

Website
- https://leg.mt.gov/senate/

The Montana State Legislature is the state legislature of the U.S. state of Montana. It is composed of the 100-member Montana House of Representatives and the 50-member Montana Senate.

This is a list of current and former notable members of the Montana Senate.

- LeRoy H. Anderson
- J. Hugo Aronson
- Ron Arthun
- Shannon Augare
- Joe Balyeat
- Debby Barrett
- Chet Blaylock
- Anders Blewett
- John Bohlinger
- Gary Branae
- John Brenden
- Bob Brown (Montana politician)
- Roy Brown (Montana politician)
- Taylor Brown
- Edward Buttrey
- Mary Caferro
- Vicki Cocchiarella
- Mike Cooney
- Bruce Crippen
- Wesley A. D'Ewart
- Steve Daines
- Zales Ecton
- Jim Elliott
- Ron Erickson
- Jeff Essmann
- Tom Facey
- Steve Gallus
- Kim Gillan
- Bradley Maxon Hamlett
- Ken Hansen
- Dan Harrington (politician)
- Bob Hawks
- Greg Hinkle
- Elmer Holt
- Rowlie Hutton
- Verdell Jackson
- Larry Jent
- Greg Jergeson
- Llew Jones
- Thomas Lee Judge
- Carol Juneau
- Christine Kaufmann (Montana politician)
- Jim Keane (politician)
- Ken Miller (Montana politician)
- Allen Kolstad
- Bob Lake
- Cliff Larsen
- Lane Larson
- Jesse Laslovich
- Dave Lewis (politician)
- Greg Lind
- John Melcher
- Frederick Moore (politician)
- Lynda Moss
- Carmine Mowbray
- Terry Murphy (American politician)
- Henry L. Myers
- Edwin L. Norris
- Donald Grant Nutter
- Alan Olson
- Gerald Pease
- Jim Peterson (Montana politician)
- Jason Priest
- Rick Ripley
- Don Ryan
- Trudi Schmidt
- Jim Shockley
- Frank Smith (Montana politician)
- Jon Sonju
- Carolyn Squires
- Corey Stapleton
- Donald Steinbeisser
- Stan Stephens
- Sharon Stewart-Peregoy
- Robert Story
- Tom Stout
- Jon Tester
- Joseph Tropila
- Mitch Tropila
- Bruce Tutvedt
- Kendall Van Dyk
- Chas Vincent
- Gene Vuckovich
- Edward Walker (politician)
- David Wanzenried
- Dan Weinberg
- Benjamin F. White (Montana politician)
- Carol Williams (Montana politician)
- Bill Wilson (Montana politician)
- Jonathan Windy Boy
- Art Wittich
- Bill Yellowtail
- Ryan Zinke

== See also ==
- List of people from Montana
- List of Montana state representatives
