= 2022 United States House of Representatives elections in Montana =

- November 8, 2022

Both Montana seats to the United States House of Representatives
	Majority party	Minority party	Third party
Party	Republican	Democratic	Independent
Last election	1	0	0
Seats won	2	0	0
Seat change	▲1	Steady	Steady
Popular vote	245,081	158,745	47,195
Percentage	52.86%	34.24%	10.18%
Swing	▼3.53%	▼9.37%	New

Republican hold Republican gain
Republican
40–50%
50–60%
60–70%
70–80%
80–90%
Democratic
50–60%
60–70%

The 2022 United States House of Representatives elections in Montana were held on November 8, 2022, to elect two U.S. Representatives from Montana, one from each of its congressional districts. Prior to this election cycle, Montana had one at-large district, represented by Republican Matt Rosendale. However, during the 2020 redistricting cycle, Montana regained the 2nd district that it lost in 1993.

As a result, Montana became the first state relegated from multi-district to at-large status that reclaimed a second representative in the House of Representatives, in which Rosendale ran for re-election.

== Overview ==
=== District ===
District	Republican		Democratic		Others		Total		Result
District	Votes	%	Votes	%	Votes	%	Votes	%	Result
District 1	123,102	49.65%	115,265	46.49%	9,593	3.87%	247,960	100.00%	Republican gain
District 2	121,979	56.56%	43,480	20.16%	50,213	23.28%	215,672	100.00%	Republican hold
Total	245,081	52.86%	158,745	34.24%	59,806	12.90%	463,632	100.00%	

Popular vote
Republican	52.86%
Democratic	34.24%
Independent	10.83%
Libertarian	2.07%

House seats
Republican	100.00%

== District 1 ==
2022 Montana's 1st congressional district election
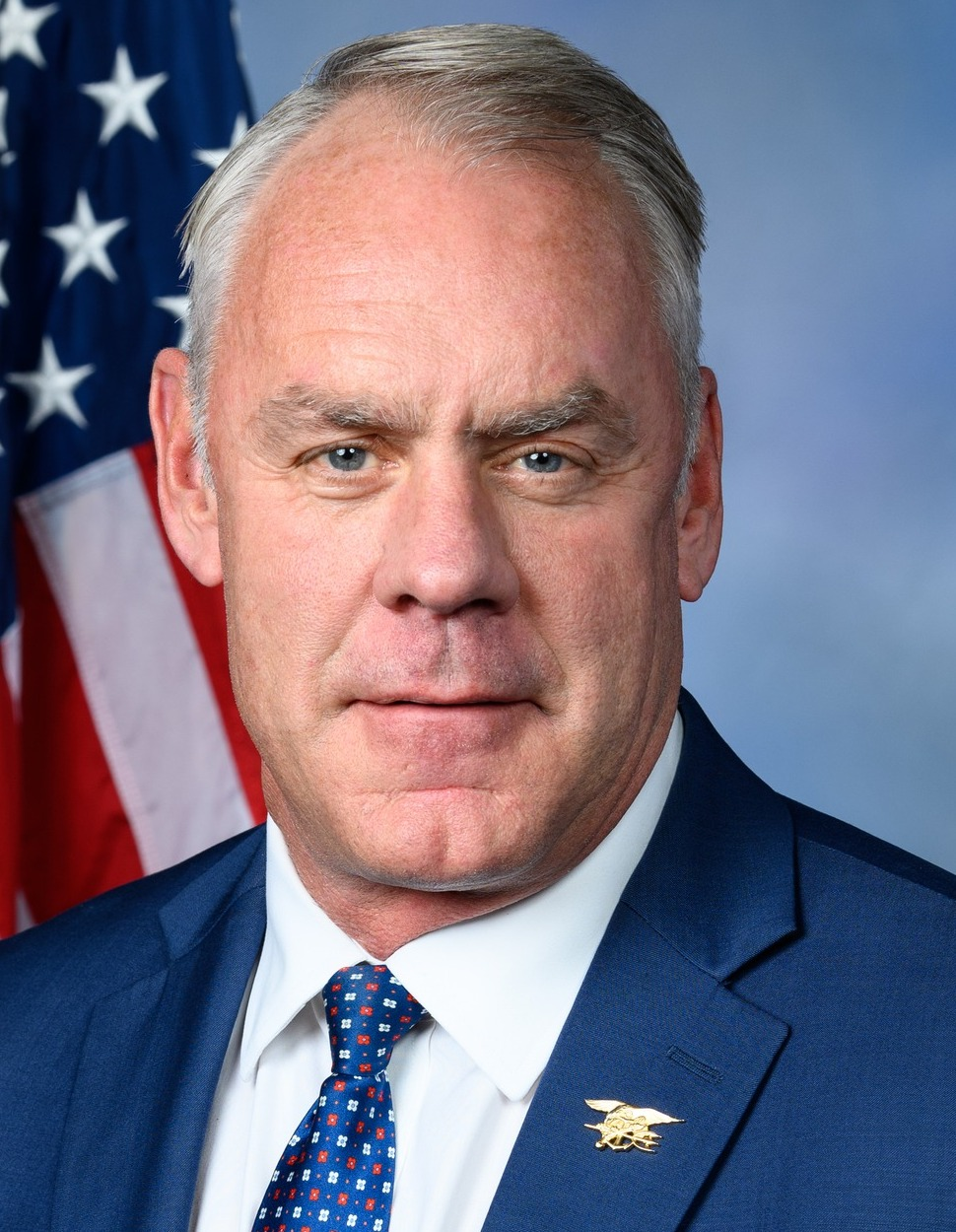

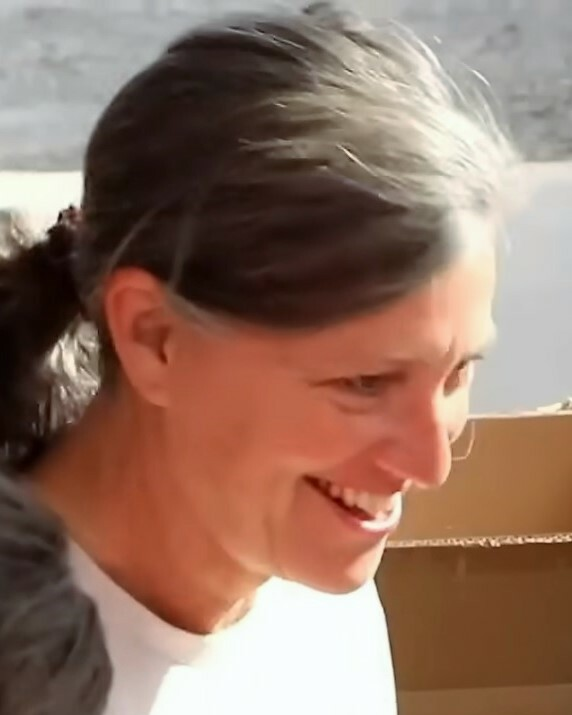
Nominee	Ryan Zinke	Monica Tranel
Party	Republican	Democratic
Popular vote	123,102	115,265
Percentage	49.65%	46.49%
- Zinke: 50−60% 60−70% 70−80% 80−90% Tranel: 40−50% 50−60% 60−70% 70−80% 80−90% >90% No votes
U.S. Representative before election
None
(New district)
Elected U.S. Representative
Ryan Zinke
Republican

The 1st district is based in mountainous Western Montana, including the cities of Missoula, Bozeman and Butte. Prior to redistricting in 2021, it was represented along with the rest of the state by at-large district representative Matt Rosendale. Since Rosendale ran for re-election in the 2nd district, this district was an open seat.

=== Republican primary ===
==== Candidates ====
===== Nominee =====
- Ryan Zinke, former U.S. Secretary of the Interior and former U.S. Representative from Montana's at-large congressional district

===== Eliminated in primary =====
- Mitch Heuer
- Matt Jette, teacher and perennial candidate
- Albert Olszewski, former state senator, candidate for U.S. Senate in 2018 and for Governor of Montana in 2020
- Mary Todd, pastor

==== Endorsements ====
Ryan Zinke

U.S. Executive Branch officials

- Donald Trump, 45th president of the United States (2017–2021)

U.S. Senators

- Marsha Blackburn, U.S. Senator from Tennessee (2019–present)
- Steve Daines, U.S. Senator from Montana (2015–present) and former U.S. Representative for Montana's at-large congressional district (2013–2015)

State officials

- Greg Gianforte, Governor of Montana (2021–present) and former U.S. Representative for Montana's at-large congressional district (2017–2021)

Organizations

- Congressional Leadership Fund
Declined to endorse

U.S. Representative

- Matt Rosendale, U.S. Representative for Montana's at-large congressional district (2021–2025)

==== Results ====
Primary results by county: Zinke: 40–50%; 50–60%; Olszewski: 40–50%

Republican primary results
Party	Candidate	Votes	%
Republican	Ryan Zinke	35,601	41.7
Republican	Albert Olszewski	33,927	39.7
Republican	Mary Todd	8,915	10.4
Republican	Matthew Jette	4,973	5.8
Republican	Mitch Heuer	1,953	2.3
Total votes		85,369	100.0

=== Democratic primary ===
==== Candidates ====
===== Nominee =====
- Monica Tranel, former Olympian and nominee for District 4 of the Montana Public Service Commission in 2020

===== Eliminated in primary =====
- Cora Neumann, public health expert, founder of the Global First Ladies Alliance and candidate for U.S. Senate in 2020
- Tom Winter, former state representative and candidate for Montana's at-large congressional district in 2020

===== Withdrew =====
- Laurie Bishop, state representative

===== Declined =====
- Kimberly Dudik, former state representative and candidate for Montana Attorney General in 2020
- Shane Morigeau, state senator and nominee for Montana State Auditor in 2020 (ran for re-election)
- Whitney Williams, businesswoman, daughter of former U.S. Representative Pat Williams, and candidate for Governor of Montana in 2020

==== Endorsements ====
Monica Tranel

Statewide officials

- Brian Schweitzer, former governor of Montana (2005–2013)

State legislators

- Mike Jopek, former state representative (2004–2010)
- Dan Weinberg, former state senator (2004–2008)

Organizations

- League of Conservation Voters

Labor unions

- Montana Federation of Public Employees

Individuals

- Hank Green, a YouTuber, science communicator, novelist, stand-up comedian, and entrepreneur
Tom Winter

U.S. Representative

- Ro Khanna, U.S. Representative for California's 17th congressional district (2017–present)

Organization

- Brand New Congress
- Progressive Change Campaign Committee

==== Results ====
Democratic primary results
Party	Candidate	Votes	%
Democratic	Monica Tranel	37,138	64.9
Democratic	Cora Neumann	15,396	26.9
Democratic	Tom Winter	4,723	8.2
Total votes		57,257	100.0

=== Libertarian primary ===
==== Candidates ====
===== Nominee =====
- John Lamb, farmer and business owner

=== General election ===
==== Debate ====
2022 Montana's 1st congressional district debate
No.	Date	Host	Moderator	Link	Republican	Democratic	Libertarian
Key: P Participant A Absent N Not invited I Invited W Withdrawn							
Key: P Participant A Absent N Not invited I Invited W Withdrawn					Ryan Zinke	Monica Tranel	John Lamb
1	Oct. 1, 2022	KTVQ	Donna Kelly		P	P	N

==== Predictions ====
Source	Ranking	As of
The Cook Political Report	Lean R (flip)	October 19, 2022
Inside Elections	Lean R (flip)	October 7, 2022
Sabato's Crystal Ball	Lean R (flip)	October 19, 2022
Politico	Likely R (flip)	April 5, 2022
RCP	Likely R (flip)	June 9, 2022
Fox News	Lean R (flip)	October 18, 2022
DDHQ	Likely R (flip)	September 29, 2022
538	Likely R (flip)	November 8, 2022
The Economist	Likely R (flip)	September 28, 2022

==== Polling ====
Poll source	Date(s) administered	Sample size (Note: Key: A – all adults RV – registered voters LV – likely voters V – unclear)	Margin of error	Ryan Zinke (R)	Monica Tranel (D)	John Lamb (L)	Undecided
MSU Billings	October 3–14, 2022	<343 (V) (Note: The poll had 343 total respondents across both congressional districts)	± 5.9%	34%	25%	17%	20%
Victoria Research (D) (Note: This poll was sponsored by the Big Sky Voters PAC, which supports Tranel)	September 14–19, 2022	400 (LV)	± 3.4%	41%	40%	8%	11%
Impact Research (D) (Note: This poll was sponsored by Tranel's campaign)	September 14–19, 2022	400 (LV)	± 4.9%	45%	43%	3%	9%

==== Results ====
2022 Montana's 1st congressional district election
Party	Candidate	Votes	%
Republican	Ryan Zinke	123,102	49.65%
Democratic	Monica Tranel	115,265	46.49%
Libertarian	John Lamb	9,593	3.87%
Total votes		247,960	100.00%
Republican win (new seat)			

===== By county =====
County	Ryan Zinke Republican		Monica Tranel Democratic		John Lamb Libertarian		Margin		Total
County	Votes	%	Votes	%	Votes	%	Votes	%	Votes
Beaverhead	3,004	66.36%	1,330	29.38%	193	4.26%	1,674	36.98%	4,527
Deer Lodge	1,510	37.96%	2,256	56.71%	212	5.33%	-746	-18.75%	3,978
Flathead	29,290	61.37%	16,571	34.72%	1,864	3.91%	12,719	26.65%	47,725
Gallatin	22,288	42.18%	28,747	54.40%	1,810	3.43%	-6,459	-12.22%	52,845
Glacier	1,213	39.49%	1,748	56.90%	111	3.61%	-535	-17.42%	3,072
Granite	1,149	64.48%	533	29.91%	100	5.61%	616	34.57%	1,782
Lake	7,389	55.48%	5,388	40.46%	541	4.06%	2,001	15.02%	13,318
Lincoln	6,687	71.65%	2,200	23.57%	446	4.78%	4,487	48.08%	9,333
Madison	3,290	65.39%	1,483	29.48%	258	5.13%	1,807	35.92%	5,031
Mineral	1,458	66.76%	580	26.56%	146	6.68%	878	40.20%	2,184
Missoula	18,846	33.33%	35,991	63.66%	1,703	3.01%	-17,145	-30.32%	56,540
Pondera (part)	461	64.57%	227	31.79%	26	3.64%	234	32.77%	714
Powell	1,762	68.48%	639	24.83%	172	6.68%	1,123	43.65%	2,573
Ravalli	15,158	64.32%	7,523	31.92%	886	3.76%	7,635	32.40%	23,567
Sanders	4,549	68.67%	1,615	24.38%	460	6.94%	2,934	44.29%	6,624
Silver Bow	5,048	35.68%	8,434	59.62%	665	4.70%	-3,386	-23.93%	14,147
Totals	123,102	49.65%	115,265	46.49%	9,593	3.87%	7,837	3.16%	247,960

== District 2 ==
2022 Montana's 2nd congressional district election
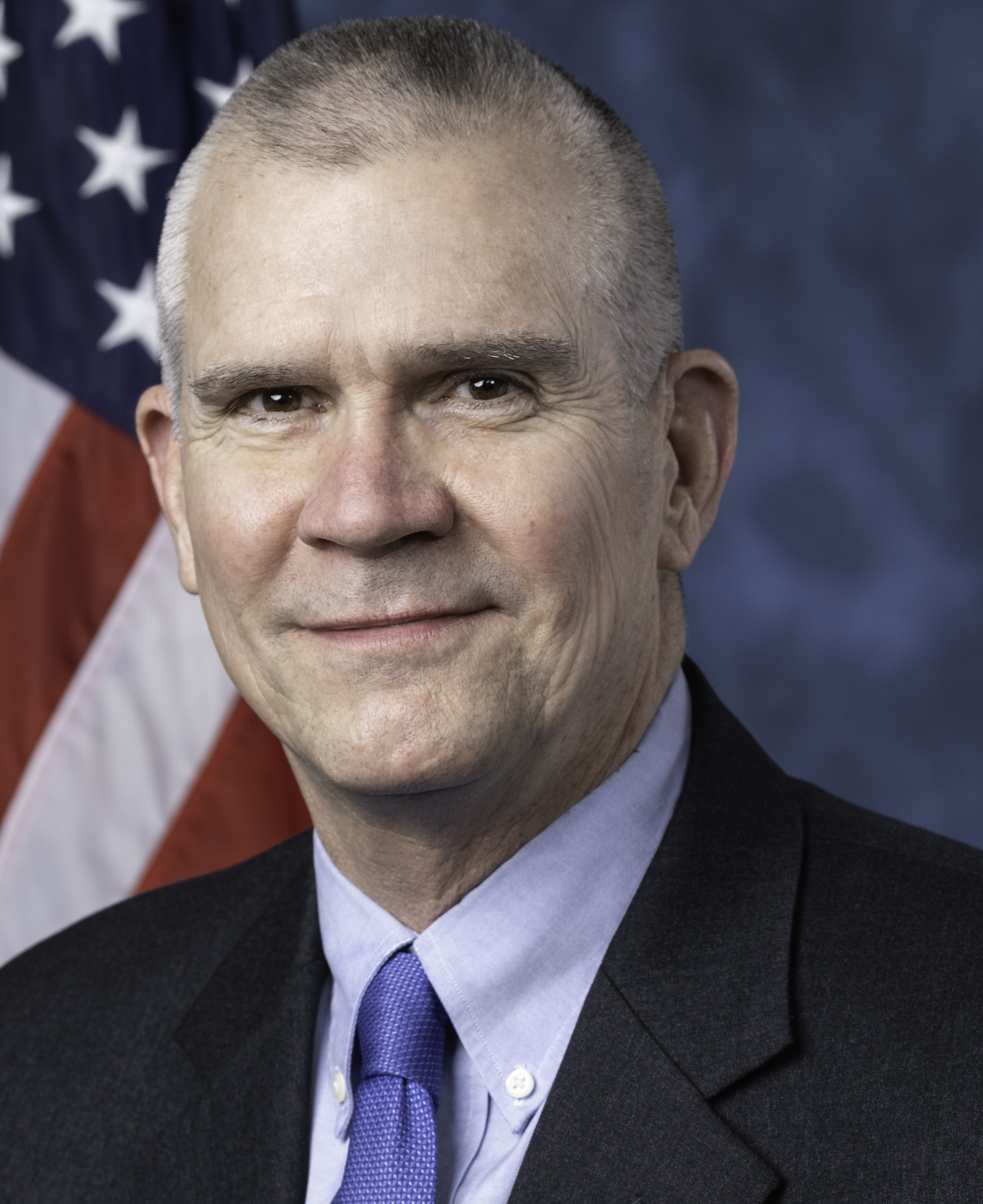

Nominee	Matt Rosendale	Gary Buchanan	Penny Ronning
Party	Republican	Independent	Democratic
Popular vote	121,979	46,915	43,480
Percentage	56.56%	21.88%	20.16%
- Rosendale: 30–40% 40–50% 50–60% 60–70% 70–80% 80–90% >90% Buchanan: 30–40% 40–50% 50–60% 60–70% Ronning: 30–40% 40–50% 50–60% 60–70% 70–80% 80–90% No votes
U.S. Representative before election
Matt Rosendale
Republican
Elected U.S. Representative
Matt Rosendale
Republican

The 2nd district encompasses much of the state east of the Continental Divide, including the cities of Billings, Great Falls and Helena. Incumbent Matt Rosendale, a Republican who was elected in the at-large district with 56.4% of the vote in 2020, sought re-election in this district.

This was the first U.S. congressional election where the Democratic nominee finished third since the 2018 Maine Senate race.

=== Republican primary ===
==== Nominee ====
- Matt Rosendale, incumbent U.S. Representative from Montana's at-large congressional district

==== Eliminated in primary ====
- Kyle Austin, healthcare company owner
- James Boyette, sales manager
- Charles Walking Child, activist

==== Declined ====
- Russell Fagg, former Yellowstone County district judge, former state representative, and candidate for U.S. Senate in 2018
- Tim Fox, former Montana Attorney General and candidate for Governor of Montana in 2020
- Brad Johnson, chair of the Montana Public Service Commission and former Montana Secretary of State

==== Endorsements ====
Matt Rosendale

U.S. Executive Branch officials

- Donald Trump, 45th president of the United States (2017–2021)

Organizations

- Tea Party Express

==== Results ====
Republican primary results
Party	Candidate	Votes	%
Republican	Matt Rosendale (incumbent)	73,453	75.7
Republican	Kyle Austin	11,930	12.3
Republican	Charles Walking Child	5,909	6.1
Republican	James Boyette	5,712	5.9
Total votes		97,004	100.0

=== Democratic primary ===
==== Nominee ====
- Penny Ronning, former Billings city councilor

==== Eliminated in primary ====
- Skylar Williams, student

==== Deceased ====
- Mark Sweeney, state senator (died May 6, 2022; remained on ballot)

==== Withdrawn ====
- Jack Ballard, outdoor writer and candidate for U.S. Senate in 2020

==== Declined ====
- Steve Bullock, former governor of Montana, candidate for President of the United States in 2020, and nominee for U.S. Senate in 2020
- Mike Cooney, former lieutenant governor of Montana and nominee for Governor of Montana in 2020

==== Endorsements ====
Penny Ronning

Organizations

- Vote Common Good

==== Results ====
Democratic primary results
Party	Candidate	Votes	%
Democratic	Penny Ronning	21,983	58.5
Democratic	Mark Sweeney †	8,586	22.8
Democratic	Skylar Williams	7,029	18.7
Total votes		37,598	100.0

=== Libertarian primary ===
==== Nominee ====
- Sam Rankin, lawyer, real estate broker, and perennial candidate

==== Eliminated in primary ====
- Roger Roots, nominee for U.S. Senate in 2014
- Samuel Thomas

==== Results ====
Libertarian primary results
Party	Candidate	Votes	%
Libertarian	Sam Rankin	958	47.0
Libertarian	Samuel Thomas	554	27.2
Libertarian	Roger Roots	526	25.8
Total votes		2,038	100.0

=== Independents ===
==== Declared ====
- Gary Buchanan, financial advisor and former director of the Montana Department of Commerce

==== Disqualified ====
- Curt Zygmond, beer brewing intern

==== Endorsements ====
Gary Buchanan

State officials

- Bob Brown, former Montana Secretary of State (2001–2005) and Republican nominee for governor in 2004
- Monica Lindeen, former Montana State Auditor (2009–2017) (Democratic)
- Marc Racicot, former governor of Montana (1993–2001) (Republican)

State legislators

- Dorothy Bradley, former state representative (1971–1979, 1985–1993) and nominee for governor in 1992 (Democratic)
- Dave Lewis, former state senator and nominee for lieutenant governor in 2004 (Republican)
- Jim Peterson, former majority leader of the Montana Senate and former president of the Montana Stockgrowers Association (Republican)

Local politicians

- Susan Good Geise, former Lewis and Clark County commissioner and former chair of the Montana Republican Party (Libertarian)

Labor unions

- AFL-CIO
- Montana Federation of Public Employees

=== General election ===
==== Debate ====
2022 Montana's 2nd congressional district debate
No.	Date	Host	Moderator	Link	Republican	Democratic	Libertarian	Independent
Key: P Participant A Absent N Not invited I Invited W Withdrawn								
Key: P Participant A Absent N Not invited I Invited W Withdrawn					Matt Rosendale	Penny Ronning	Sam Rankin	Gary Buchanan
1	Oct. 1, 2022	KTVQ			P	P	N	P

==== Predictions ====
Source	Ranking	As of
The Cook Political Report	Solid R	November 16, 2021
Inside Elections	Solid R	November 19, 2021
Sabato's Crystal Ball	Safe R	November 17, 2021
Politico	Solid R	April 5, 2022
RCP	Safe R	June 9, 2022
Fox News	Solid R	July 11, 2022
DDHQ	Solid R	July 20, 2022
538	Solid R	June 30, 2022
The Economist	Safe R	September 28, 2022

==== Polling ====
Poll source	Date(s) administered	Sample size	Margin of error	Matt Rosendale (R)	Penny Ronning (D)	Gary Buchanan (I)	Sam Rankin (L)	Undecided
MSU Billings	October 3–14, 2022	<343 (V)	± 5.9%	35%	17%	21%	5%	17%

==== Results ====
2022 Montana's 2nd congressional district election
Party	Candidate	Votes	%
Republican	Matt Rosendale (incumbent)	121,979	56.56%
Independent	Gary Buchanan	47,195	21.88%
Democratic	Penny Ronning	43,480	20.16%
Libertarian	Sam Rankin	3,018	1.40%
Total votes		215,672	100.00%
Republican hold			

==== By county ====
County	Matt Rosendale Republican		Penny Ronning Democratic		Gary Buchanan Independent		Sam Rankin Libertarian		Margin		Total
County	Votes	%	Votes	%	Votes	%	Votes	%	Votes	%	Votes
Big Horn	1,476	45.47%	1,214	37.40%	505	15.56%	51	1.57%	262	8.07%	3,246
Blaine	1,040	56.06%	587	31.64%	208	11.21%	20	1.08%	453	24.42%	1,855
Broadwater	2,417	70.47%	399	11.63%	559	16.30%	55	1.60%	1,858	54.17%	3,430
Carbon	3,294	56.47%	1,030	17.66%	1,420	24.34%	89	1.53%	1,874	32.13%	5,833
Carter	663	87.35%	37	4.87%	46	6.06%	13	1.71%	617	81.29%	759
Cascade	15,634	53.76%	6,638	22.83%	6,397	22.00%	410	1.41%	8,996	30.94%	29,079
Chouteau	1,463	63.89%	395	17.25%	390	17.03%	42	1.83%	1,068	46.64%	2,290
Custer	2,959	64.88%	848	18.59%	684	15.00%	70	1.53%	2,111	46.28%	4,561
Daniels	601	78.98%	80	10.51%	68	8.94%	12	1.58%	521	68.46%	761
Dawson	2,583	72.68%	524	14.74%	425	11.96%	22	0.62%	2,059	57.93%	3,554
Fallon	1,053	84.85%	94	7.57%	87	7.01%	7	0.56%	959	77.28%	1,241
Fergus	3,808	70.19%	619	11.41%	927	17.09%	71	1.31%	2,881	53.11%	5,425
Garfield	586	89.06%	18	2.74%	46	6.99%	8	1.22%	540	82.07%	658
Golden Valley	348	78.03%	37	8.30%	53	11.88%	8	1.79%	295	66.14%	446
Hill	2,703	52.58%	1,463	28.46%	871	16.94%	104	2.02%	1,240	24.12%	5,141
Jefferson	3,752	57.91%	1,031	15.91%	1,615	24.93%	81	1.25%	2,137	32.98%	6,479
Judith Basin	784	71.66%	127	11.61%	170	15.54%	13	1.19%	614	56.12%	1,094
Lewis and Clark	14,237	42.72%	7,422	22.27%	11,201	33.61%	463	1.39%	3,036	9.11%	33,323
Liberty	660	71.97%	117	12.76%	134	14.61%	6	0.65%	526	57.36%	917
McCone	770	83.06%	92	9.92%	59	6.36%	6	0.65%	678	73.14%	927
Meagher	628	68.78%	89	9.75%	176	19.28%	20	2.19%	452	49.51%	913
Musselshell	1,793	79.37%	183	8.10%	256	11.33%	27	1.20%	1,537	68.04%	2,259
Park	4,236	46.98%	2,487	27.58%	2,146	23.80%	148	1.64%	1,749	19.40%	9,017
Petroleum	235	81.31%	13	4.50%	39	13.49%	2	0.69%	196	67.82%	289
Phillips	1,376	78.40%	203	11.57%	159	9.06%	17	0.97%	1,173	66.84%	1,755
Pondera (part)	1,081	67.31%	215	13.39%	282	17.56%	28	1.74%	799	49.75%	1,606
Powder River	724	80.53%	62	6.90%	108	12.01%	5	0.56%	616	68.52%	899
Prairie	467	76.68%	72	11.82%	62	10.18%	8	1.31%	395	64.86%	609
Richland	2,941	78.34%	530	14.12%	234	6.23%	49	1.31%	2,411	64.22%	3,754
Roosevelt	1,396	54.15%	969	37.59%	166	6.44%	47	1.82%	427	16.56%	2,578
Rosebud	1,747	64.56%	516	19.07%	413	15.26%	30	1.11%	1,231	45.49%	2,706
Sheridan	1,097	68.09%	353	21.91%	130	8.07%	31	1.92%	744	46.18%	1,611
Stillwater	3,214	70.98%	488	10.78%	768	16.96%	58	1.28%	2,446	54.02%	4,528
Sweet Grass	1,276	68.57%	205	11.02%	362	19.45%	18	0.97%	914	49.11%	1,861
Teton	1,917	65.88%	479	16.46%	485	16.67%	29	1.00%	1,432	49.21%	2,910
Toole	1,212	73.14%	194	11.71%	222	13.40%	29	1.75%	990	59.75%	1,657
Treasure	307	72.75%	22	5.21%	91	21.56%	2	0.47%	216	51.18%	422
Valley	2,217	68.85%	512	15.90%	429	13.32%	62	1.93%	1,705	52.95%	3,220
Wheatland	576	68.49%	84	9.99%	168	19.98%	13	1.55%	408	48.51%	841
Wibaux	357	81.32%	33	7.52%	45	10.25%	4	0.91%	312	71.07%	439
Yellowstone	32,351	53.23%	12,999	21.39%	14,589	24.00%	840	1.38%	17,762	29.22%	60,779
Totals	121,979	56.56%	43,480	20.16%	47,195	21.88%	3,018	1.40%	74,784	34.67%	215,672

== See also ==
- 2022 Montana elections
