= Tim Callahan =

Tim Callahan may refer to:

- Tim Callahan (academic), associate professor of geology and environmental geosciences
- Tim Callahan (politician) (born 1955), member of the Montana House of Representatives
- Tim Callahan (American football) (1895–?), American football player
