= Jopek =

Jopek is a surname. Notable people with the surname include:

- Anna Maria Jopek (born 1970), Polish vocalist, songwriter and improviser
- Björn Jopek (born 1993), German footballer
- Mike Jopek (born 1964), American politician
