= Senator Weinberg =

Senator Weinberg may refer to:

- Dan Weinberg (fl. 2010s), Montana State Senate
- Loretta Weinberg (born 1935), New Jersey State Senate
