= Cocchiarella =

Cocchiarella is a surname. Notable people with the surname include:

- Nino Cocchiarella (born 1933), American philosopher
- Vicki Cocchiarella (born 1949), American politician
