= Senator Vincent =

Senator Vincent may refer to:

- Beverly M. Vincent (1890–1980), Kentucky State Senate
- Chas Vincent (born 1977), Montana State Senate
- Edward Vincent Jr. (1934–2012), California State Senate
