= Senator Gallus =

Senator Gallus may refer to:

- John Gallus (politician) (fl. 2000s–2010s), New Hampshire Senate
- Steve Gallus (fl. 1990s–2010s), Montana State Senate
