= Libby High School =

- U.S. National Register of Historic Places
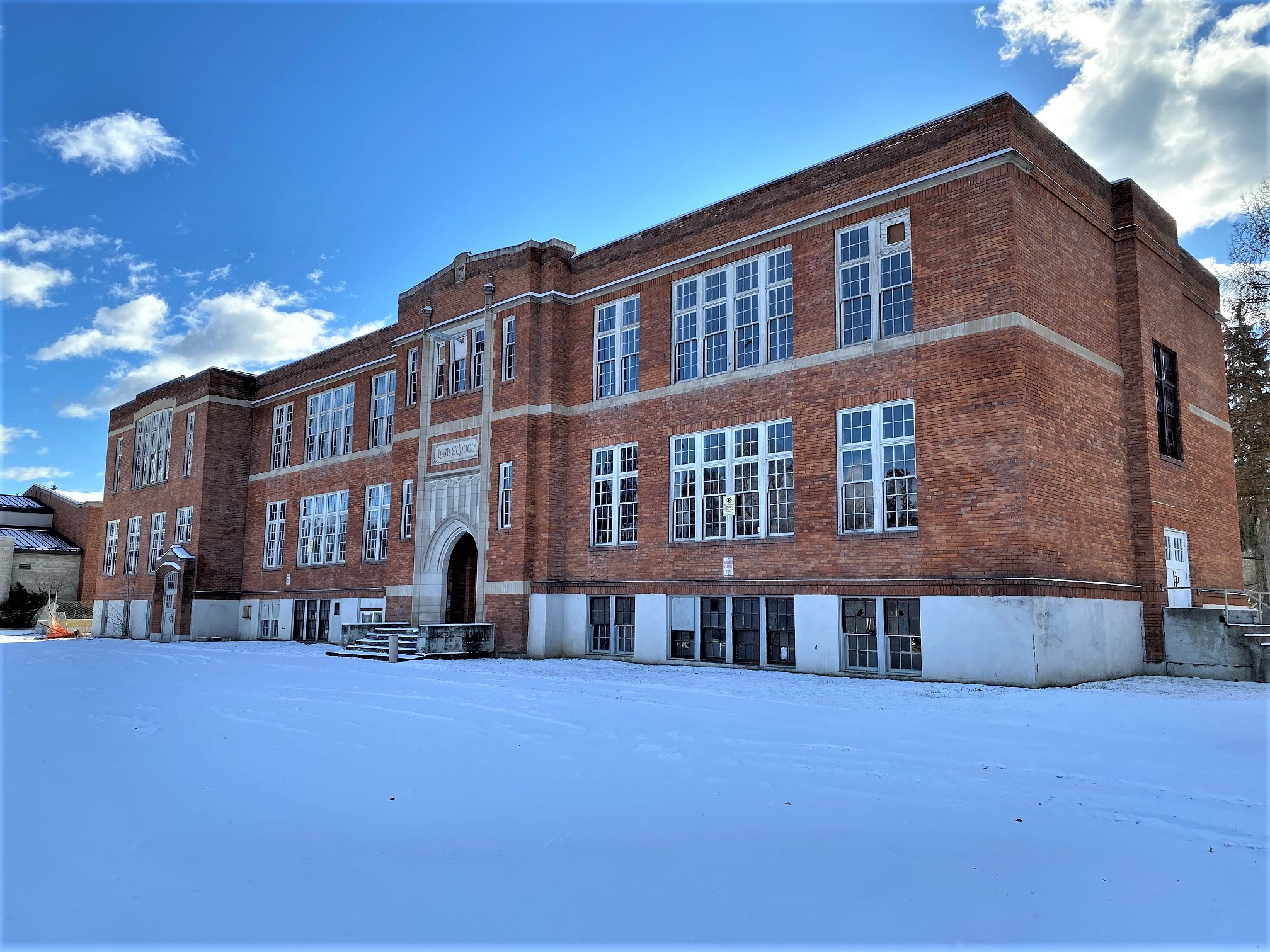

- Location within Montana Location within the United States
- Location: Southeastern corner of the junction of Mineral Ave. and E. Lincoln Boulevard
- Coordinates: 48.38888888°N 115.5527777°W
- NRHP reference No.: 08000823
- Added to NRHP: August 20, 2008

The former Libby High School is a building in Libby, Montana, US added to the National Register of Historic Places on August 20, 2008.

According to the filing documents:

The historic Libby High School stands at the southeast corner of Mineral Avenue and East Lincoln Boulevard, at the entrance to downtown Libby. The school is a stately presence in the heart of the community, the largest and most highstyle building in town. Set perpendicular to the town's main street, the school and its expansive lawn and landscaped boulevard entry is a visual marker that signals the eastern entrance to the downtown heart of the community.

== Notable alumni ==
- Gerald Bennett - Politician in Montana. Class of 1974.
- Steve Gunderson - Politician in Montana. Class of 1975.
- Duane Nellis, former president of Ohio University, Texas Tech University and the University of Idaho, Class of 1972
- Marc Racicot, Governor of Montana (1993–2001), Class of 1966

== Present Libby High School ==
The Libby School District maintains a combined Middle School/High School at 150 Education Way, at the SW corner of the intersection of Education Way and U.S. Highway 2, in Libby, Montana. Its coordinates are N48°23'39.8"/W115°34'16.6".
