= Mike Cuffe =

American politician

Member of the Montana Senate from the 1st district
- Incumbent
- Assumed office January 7, 2019
- Preceded by: Chas Vincent
- Succeeded by: Neil Duram

Member of the Montana House of Representatives from the 2nd district
- In office January 3, 2011 – January 7, 2019
- Preceded by: Chas Vincent
- Succeeded by: Neil Duram

Personal details
- Born: 1946 (age 79–80) Eureka, Montana
- Party: Republican
- Spouse: JoAn
- Education: University of Montana
- Profession: Business owner

Mike Cuffe is a Republican member of the Montana Legislature. He was first elected to House District 2 in 2017. Cuffe now represents Senate District 1 in the Lincoln County area. Cuffe received a Journalism degree from the University of Montana. He previously worked as an editor for Libby Western News and as a press secretary for Dick Shoup.

== See also ==
- Montana House of Representatives, District 2
