= Jerry Bennett =

Jerry Bennett (or similar) may refer to:

== People ==
- Jerry Bennett (politician) (born 1956), American politician in Montana
- Jerry Bennett, musician on Bulletproof Heart

== Fictional characters ==
- Geri Bennett, fictional female character in 2011 film, Abduction
- Gerry Bennett, character in Night of the Lepus

== See also ==
- Gerard Bennett (disambiguation)
