= Rick Maedje =

American logger and politician in Montana

Member of the Montana House of Representatives from the 81st district
- In office January 2003 – December 2004
- Succeeded by: Chas Vincent

Member of the Montana House of Representatives from the 2nd district
- In office January 2005 – December 2006
- Preceded by: Aubyn Curtiss
- Succeeded by: Chas Vincent

Personal details
- Party: Republican
- Education: Harvard University
- Occupation: Logger, politician

Rick Maedje is an American logger, builder, real estate consultant and politician from Montana. Maedje is a former Republican member of Montana House of Representatives. He is a graduate of Harvard University Faculty of Arts & Sciences School with a B.A. in Government.

== Career ==
Maedje is a logger.

On November 5, 2002, Maedje won the election and became a Republican member of Montana House of Representatives for District 81. Maedje defeated Pete Zarnowski with 62.07% of the votes.

On November 2, 2004, Maedje won the election and became a Republican member of Montana House of Representatives for District 2. Maedje defeated Noel E. Williams with 58.24% of the votes.

== Personal life ==
Maedje lives in Fortine, Montana.

In May 2006, Maedje was arrested for partner assault of Kathy Wade, a former girl-friend. The case was dismissed when Wade admitted in writing Maedje did not commit any assault.

== See also ==
- Montana House of Representatives, District 2
