= Tanner Smith (disambiguation) =

Tanner Smith (c. 1887–1919) was an American criminal gang leader

Tanner Smith may also refer to:

- Tanner Smith (basketball) (born 1990), American basketball player
- Tanner Smith (footballer) (born 1994), Australian footballer
- Tanner Smith (politician), American politician
