= Gerard Bennett =

Gerard Bennett may refer to:

- Gerard Bennett, musician in 'O' Level
- Gerard Bennett in Southwark London Borough Council election, 2014

== See also ==
- Gerald Bennett (born 1956), American politician
- Jerry Bennett (disambiguation)
