= Cora Neumann =

American politician

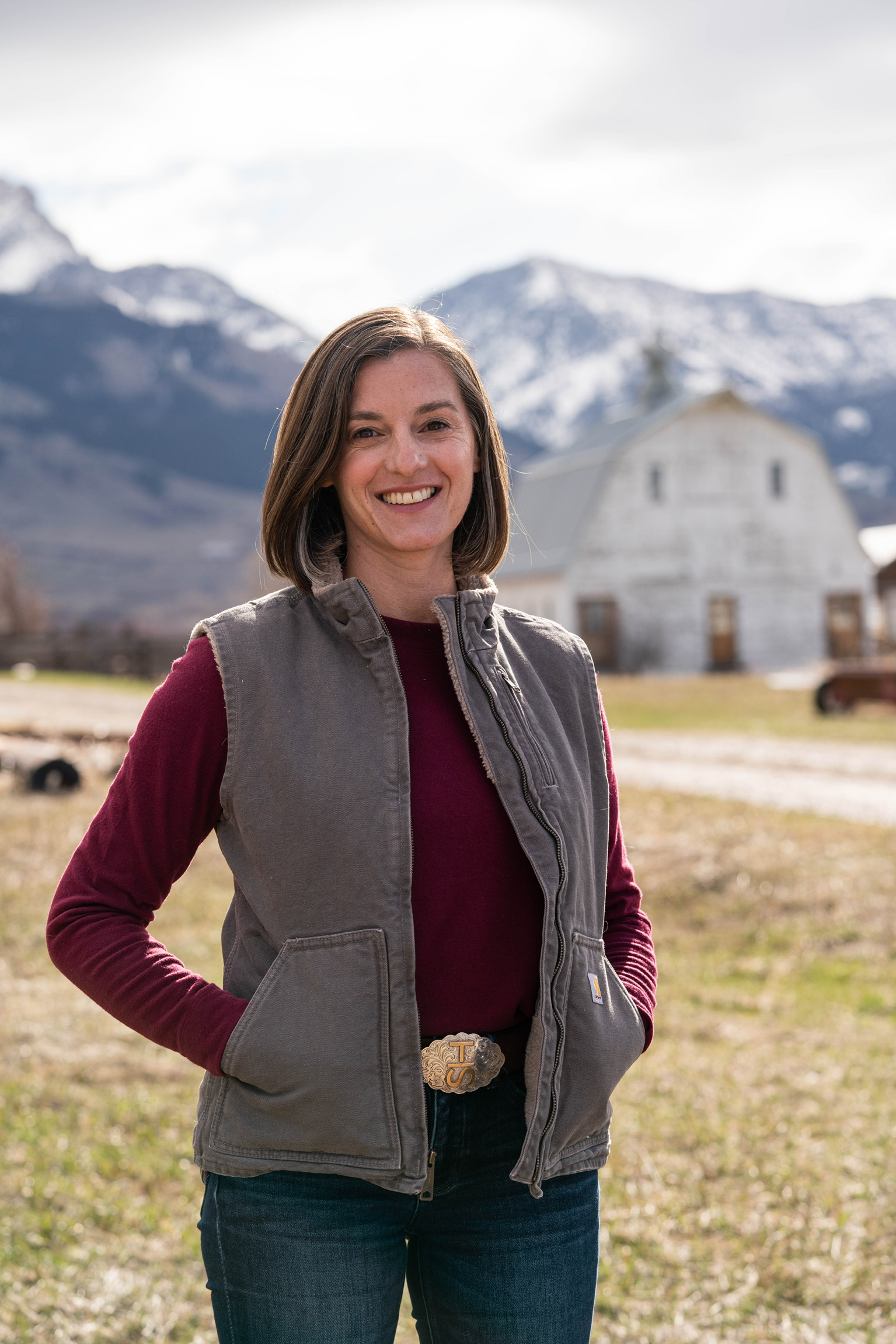

Member of the Montana Senate from the 30th district
- Incumbent
- Assumed office January 2025
- Preceded by: John Esp

Personal details
- Party: Democratic
- Education: Columbia University (MPH); University of Oxford (DrPH)

Dr. Cora Neumann is an American politician elected to the Montana Senate from the 30th district in the 2024 election, as a member of the Democratic Party. Neumann ran for U.S. House of Representatives in Montana's first congressional district in 2022, but was defeated by Monica Tranel in the primary.

Sen. Neumann works in public health and previously was a senior advisor to the State Department's Global Women's Business Initiative.

== Early life and education ==
Neumann was raised in Bozeman, Montana. She is the granddaughter of Holocaust refugees.

She earned a Bachelor of Arts in political science from the University of New Mexico in 1998, a Master of Public Health from the Columbia University Mailman School of Public Health in 2003, and a Doctor of Philosophy (DPhil) in international development from the University of Oxford in 2015. Her doctoral research examined traditional health networks in conflict-affected regions along the Thailand–Myanmar border.

== Career ==
=== Early career and public health work ===
From 1999 to 2001, Neumann worked as a communications coordinator at the American Jewish Committee in New York City. She later served as a research fellow at Columbia University and worked as an editorial assistant at the World Health Organization. She has also held roles at the RAND Corporation and the Montana Public Health Institute.

From 2011 to 2013, Neumann served as a senior advisor and Franklin Fellow at the United States Department of State, where she worked on economic diplomacy and women’s economic empowerment initiatives during the tenure of Secretary of State Hillary Clinton.

She later served as a consultant and senior advisor at the George W. Bush Presidential Center and as Director of Public Policy at Care.com, where she worked on family leave, immigration reform, and labor policy issues.

=== Global First Ladies Alliance ===
In 2009, Neumann founded the Global First Ladies Alliance (GFLA), an organization that convenes and supports spouses of heads of state and government on initiatives related to public health, education, and economic development. The organization has worked with more than 100 First Ladies across multiple regions and has partnered with institutions including Columbia University.

In 2023, GFLA partnered with Columbia University Mailman School of Public Health to launch the Global First Ladies Academy, a leadership and policy training program for First Ladies and their senior advisors.

=== RESET Montana ===
In 2015, Neumann founded RESET, a Montana-based nonprofit organization focused on public health and public lands initiatives across the Rocky Mountain West. During the COVID-19 pandemic, RESET launched community response programs supporting rural and Tribal communities in Montana.

=== Native American Development Corporation ===
Since 2022, Neumann has served as Chief Community Health Officer at the Native American Development Corporation, where she oversees community health programs and the Billings Urban Indian Health and Wellness Center, one of 41 federally recognized Urban Indian Health Organizations in the United States.

== Political career ==
=== 2020 United States Senate campaign ===
In 2019, Neumann announced her candidacy for the United States Senate seat held by Republican Steve Daines. She later withdrew from the race following the entry of former Montana governor Steve Bullock into the Democratic primary.

=== 2022 United States House campaign ===
In 2022, Neumann ran in the Democratic primary for Montana's 1st congressional district. She was defeated by Monica Tranel.

2022 Montana's First Congressional District Democratic primary result
Party	Candidate	Votes	%
Democratic	Monica Tranel	37,138	64.9
Democratic	Cora Neumann	15,396	26.9
Democratic	Tom Winter	4,723	8.2
Total votes		57,257	100.0

=== Montana State Senate ===
Neumann announced her candidacy for Montana Senate District 30 in February 2024. She was elected on November 5, 2024, and assumed office on January 6, 2025. Her term is scheduled to conclude in January 2029.

Montana Senate 30th district general election, 2024
Party	Candidate	Votes	%
Democratic	Cora Neumann	5,868	58.0
Republican	Tyler Rogers	4,245	42.0
Total votes		10,113	100%

She serves on the Judiciary Committee, the Public Health, Welfare and Safety Committee, and the Agriculture, Livestock and Irrigation Committee of the Montana Senate.

== Legislation ==
During the 2025 legislative session, Neumann sponsored several bills, including:

Senate Bill 319 – Established licensure requirements for doulas in Montana and authorized Medicaid reimbursement for doula services. The bill was signed into law by Governor Greg Gianforte and takes effect on January 1, 2026.

Senate Bill 246 – Required state agencies to track and prioritize procurement of Montana-grown food products.

Senate Bill 503 – Authorized the emergency use of expired naloxone for opioid overdose response.

== Boards and affiliations ==
Neumann serves on the board of trustees of the Columbia University Mailman School of Public Health. She is a former regional vice president of the Montana Public Health Association.

== Personal life ==
Neumann lives in Bozeman, Montana, with her family. She is Jewish.
