= William Beck Sr. =

American politician (born 1934)

Member of the Montana House of Representatives from the 6th district
- In office January 3, 2007 – January 7, 2013
- Preceded by: Verdell Jackson
- Succeeded by: Carl Glimm

Personal details
- Born: December 6, 1934 (age 91) Philadelphia, Pennsylvania, U.S.
- Party: Republican

William James Beck Sr. (born December 6, 1934) is an American former politician who was a Republican member of the Montana Legislature. He was elected to House District 6 which includes the Whitefish area. He served in that capacity from 2007 to 2013.

== See also ==
- Members of the Montana House of Representatives, District 6
