= Greg Hertz =

American businessman and politician (born 1957)

Member of the Montana Senate from the 6th district
- Incumbent
- Assumed office January 4, 2021
- Preceded by: Albert Olszewski

54th Speaker of the Montana House of Representatives
- In office January 7, 2019 – January 4, 2021
- Preceded by: Austin Knudsen
- Succeeded by: Wylie Galt

Speaker pro tempore of the Montana House of Representatives
- In office January 2, 2017 – January 7, 2019
- Preceded by: Lee Randall
- Succeeded by: Wylie Galt

Member of the Montana House of Representatives from the 12th district
- In office January 5, 2015 – January 4, 2021
- Preceded by: Daniel Salomon
- Succeeded by: Linda Reksten
- In office January 7, 2013 – January 5, 2015
- Preceded by: Janna Taylor
- Succeeded by: Albert Olszewski

Personal details
- Born: December 30, 1957 (age 68) Malta, Montana, U.S.
- Party: Republican
- Education: University of Montana (BA)
- Website: Official website

Gregory J. Hertz (born December 30, 1957) is an American businessman and politician from Montana. Hertz is a Republican member of the Montana Senate for District 6, which represents the Polson area.

== Early life ==
Hertz was born in Malta, Montana.

== Education ==
Hertz earned a Bachelor of Arts in Business Administration from University of Montana.

== Career ==
In 1998, Hertz became the majority owner, President and CEO of Moody's Market, Incorporated, operator of grocery stores in Polson, Montana.

On November 6, 2012, Hertz won the election and became a Republican member of Montana House of Representatives for District 11. Hertz defeated Bud Koppy with 66.61% of the votes.

On November 4, 2014, Hertz won the election and became a Republican member of Montana House of Representatives for District 12. Hertz defeated William McLaughlin with 66.35% of the votes. On November 8, 2016, as an incumbent, Hertz won the election and continued serving District 12. Hertz defeated Susan T. Evans with 64.38% of the votes. On November 6, 2018, as an incumbent, Hertz won the election and continued serving District 12. Hertz defeated Susan T. Evans with 60.63% of the votes.

Hertz served as a Majority Whip of the House during the 2015-2016 session.

He was elected again in 2017 and 2019 to the House. Due to Montana's rules on term limits, Hertz was unable to run for a 5th term.

He was elected in 2021 to a 4 year term for Senate District 6.

== Personal life ==
Hertz's wife is Kate Hertz. They have 3 children. Hertz and his family live in Polson, Montana.

== See also ==
- Montana House of Representatives, District 11
- Montana House of Representatives, District 12

Montana House of Representatives
Preceded by Lee Randall	Speaker pro tempore of the Montana House of Representatives; 2017–2019	Succeeded by Wylie Galt
Political offices
Preceded by Austin Knudsen	Speaker of the Montana House of Representatives; 2019–2021	Succeeded by Wylie Galt
