= Steve Gunderson (Montana politician) =

American businessman and politician

Member of the Montana House of Representatives from the 1st district
- Incumbent
- Assumed office January 2, 2017
- Preceded by: Gerald Bennett

Personal details
- Born: May 31, 1957 (age 69) Seattle, Washington, U.S.
- Party: Republican
- Spouse: Cherie
- Children: 2
- Occupation: Retired businessman, politician

Steve Gunderson is an American politician from Montana. Gunderson serves as a Republican member of the Montana House of Representatives from District 1, including Libby, Montana.

== Early life ==
On May 31, 1957, Gunderson was born in Seattle, Washington.

In 1975, Gunderson graduated from Libby High School in Libby, Montana.

== Career ==
Gunderson served in the Montana Army National Guard and North Dakota Army National Guard for eight years. He served as a staff sergeant, Combat Engineer Senior NCO.

Gunderson is a retired businessman in Montana. Gunderson owned a RadioShack store, bail bondsman service, and a storage unit business in Libby, Montana. Gunderson is the cofounder of Montanore Positive Action Committee, an advocacy group.

On November 8, 2016, Gunderson won the election and became a Republican member of Montana House of Representatives for District 1. Gunderson defeated Donald Coats with 72.50% of the votes. On November 6, 2018, as an incumbent, Gunderson won the election and continued serving District 1. Gunderson defeated Donald Coats with 72.94% of the votes.

Gunderson is also a member of the Libby Asbestos Superfund Advisory Team.

== Personal life ==
Since 1969, Gunderson has been a resident of Libby, Montana. Gunderson's wife is Cherie Gunderson. They have two sons, Dustin and Jason.

== See also ==
- Montana House of Representatives, District 1
