= Frank Garner =

American police chief and politician

Member of the Montana House of Representatives from the 7th district
- Incumbent
- Assumed office January 5, 2015
- Preceded by: Randy Brodehl

Chief of Police of Kalispell Police Department
- In office 1998–2006

Personal details
- Party: Republican
- Spouse: Teresa Garner
- Children: 3
- Occupation: Chief of Police, security consultant, politician

Frank Garner is an American former Chief of Police, security consultant, and politician from Montana. Garner is a Republican member of the Montana House of Representatives for District 7, which includes parts of Kalispell, Montana.

== Education ==
In 1995, Garner earned a Criminal Justice/Criminology degree from Flathead Valley Community College. Garner attended Montana Law Enforcement Academy and FBI Regional Leadership Training Group.

== Career ==
In 1986, Garner became a police detective. In 1998, Garner became the Chief of Police in Kalispell Police Department, until 2006.

In 2004, Garner was appointed as the interim city manager of Kalispell, Montana.

In 2011, Garner became the Chief of Security at Kalispell Regional Healthcare. In 2017, Garner became a Security and Law Enforcement Consultant.

On November 4, 2014, Garner won the election and became a Republican member of Montana House of Representatives for District 7. On November 8, 2016, as an incumbent, Garner won the election and continued serving District 7. Garner defeated Lynn R. Stanley with 65.17% of the votes. On November 6, 2018, as an incumbent, Garner won the election and continued serving District 7. Garner defeated James H. Cossitt with 65.46% of the votes.

== Awards ==
- 2006 Great Chief Award. Presented by Kalispell Chamber of Commerce.
- 2014 FVCC Distinguished Alumni Award. Presented by Flathead Valley Community College.

== Personal life ==
Garner's wife is Teresa Garner. They have three children.

== See also ==
- Montana House of Representatives, District 7
