= Scott Reichner =

American politician

Member of the Montana House of Representatives from the 9th district
- In office 2009–2014
- Preceded by: William Junis Jones
- Succeeded by: Randy Brodehl

Personal details
- Born: Bigfork, Montana, U.S.
- Party: Republican
- Education: Brigham Young University
- Occupation: Politician

Scott Reichner is a Republican member of the Montana Legislature. He was elected to House District 9 which represents the Bigfork, Montana area.

On November 4, 2008, Reichner won the election and became a Republican member of Montana House of Representatives for District 9.

== See also ==
- Montana House of Representatives, District 9
