= Pat Ingraham =

American politician from Montana

Member of the Montana House of Representatives from the 13th district
- In office January 3, 2007 – January 5, 2015
- Preceded by: Paul Clark
- Succeeded by: Bob Brown

Personal details
- Born: April 29, 1950 (age 76) Derry, New Hampshire
- Party: Republican
- Spouse: Gerald

Pat Ingraham (born April 29, 1950) is a Republican member of the Montana Legislature. She was elected to House District 13 which represents the Thompson Falls area.

== Personal life ==
Ingraham's husband is Gerald. They have four children. Ingraham and her family live in Thompson Falls, Montana.

== See also ==
- Montana House of Representatives, District 13
