= Janna Taylor =

American politician from Montana

Member of the Montana House of Representatives from the 11th district
- In office January 2005 – December 2012
- Preceded by: Kim Gillan
- Succeeded by: Greg Hertz

Personal details
- Born: September 8, 1948 (age 78) Minneapolis, Minnesota
- Party: Republican
- Education: University of Minnesota
- Occupation: Rancher, politician

Janna Taylor (born September 9, 1948) was the Speaker pro Tempore for the Montana House of Representatives in 2011.

She was a Republican for District 11, which represents the Dayton area. She has served in the House from the 2005 session to the 2011 session. In 2012 she was ineligible to run for re-election due to Montana's term limits.

Taylor served as a Majority Whip in the Montana Senate for the 63rd Legislative Assembly. She was succeeded by Albert Olszewski for the 65th session.

Born in Minneapolis, Minnesota, Taylor received her bachelor's degree from the University of Minnesota. Taylor was a homemaker and rancher.

== See also ==
- Montana House of Representatives, District 11
