= Bernie Olson =

American educator, businessman, and politician from Montana

Member of the Montana House of Representatives from the 10th district
- In office January 2005 – December 2006
- Preceded by: Donald Roberts
- Succeeded by: Mark Blasdel

Member of the Montana House of Representatives from the 76th district
- In office January 2003 – December 2004
- Preceded by: Paul Sliter
- Succeeded by: Jon C. Sesso

Personal details
- Born: 1946 (age 79–80) Butte, Montana, U.S.
- Party: Republican
- Children: 2
- Education: University of Montana (BA)

Military service
- Branch/service: United States Army
- Years of service: 1968–1974
- Unit: United States Army Reserve

Bernie Olson is an American educator, businessman, and politician from Montana. Olson is a former Republican member of the Montana House of Representatives.

== Early life ==
Olson was born in Butte, Montana. He earned a Bachelor of Arts degree from the University of Montana.

== Career ==
From 1968 to 1974, Olson served in the United States Army Reserve. From 1970 to 1999, he worked as a teacher. In 1999, he became the president of Willow Creek Farm.

On November 5, 2002, Olson was elected to the Montana House of Representatives for the 76th district. He defeated Robert Dale Beck with 99.60% of the votes. On November 2, 2004, he was elected to the 10th district of the Montana House, defeating Aaron Navin Bouschor with 76.15% of the votes.

Olson was inducted into the MEA-MFT Hall of Fame in 2018.

== Personal life ==
Olson has two children. He and his family live in Lakeside, Montana.

== See also ==
- Montana House of Representatives, District 10
