= Ralph Heinert =

American engineer and politician from Montana

Member of the Montana House of Representatives from the 1st district
- In office January 2, 2005 – January 5, 2009
- Preceded by: Carol Lambert
- Succeeded by: Gerald Bennett

Personal details
- Born: August 26, 1944 (age 81) Belle Fourche, South Dakota
- Party: Republican
- Spouse: Rita Heinert
- Children: 3
- Occupation: Engineer, Politician

Ralph Heinert Jr. is a former American engineer and politician from Montana. Heinert is a former Republican member of Montana House of Representatives.

== Early life ==
On August 26, 1944, Heinert was born in Belle Fourche, South Dakota.

== Education ==
In 1967, Heinert earned a Bachelor of Science degree in Mechanical Engineering from South Dakota School of Mines and Technology in Rapid City, South Dakota.

== Career ==
In 1967, Heinert became an Engineer for American Oil Company, until 1968. In 1968, Heinert was an Engineer for Anaconda Forest Products, until 1972. In 1975, Heinert became a Project Engineer for Champion International Corporation. In 1981, Heinery became a Manager at Champion International Corporation, until 2000.

On November 2, 2004, Heinert won the election and became a Republican member of Montana House of Representatives for District 1. Heinert defeated Eileen J. Carney and Russell D. Brown with 48.71% of the votes. Heinert won by 49 votes. On November 7, 2006, as an incumbent, Heinert won the election and continued serving District 1. Heinert defeated Eileen J. Carney and Russell D. Brown with 47.70% of the votes.

== Personal life ==
Heinert's wife is Rita Heinert. They have three children. Heinert and his family live in Libby, Montana.

== See also ==
- Montana House of Representatives, District 1
