= Ralph Lenhart =

American educator and politician from Montana (1930–2022)

Ralph Lee Lenhart (October 18, 1930 – December 31, 2022) was an American educator and politician from Montana. Lenhart is a former Democratic member of the Montana House of Representatives who served from January 2003 to January 2007.

== Early life ==
On October 18, 1930, Lenhart was born in Durand, Wisconsin.

== Career ==
Lenhart was a mathematics professor at Dawson Community College. Lenhart served as the Interim President of the Montana University System. He was an at-large member for the Dawson Community College Foundation Board.

On November 5, 2002, Lenhart won the election unopposed and became a Democratic member of Montana House of Representatives for District 2.

On November 2, 2004, Lenhart won the election and became a Democratic member of Montana House of Representatives for District 38. Lenhart defeated Larry Heimbuch with 50.96% of the votes.

== Personal life and death ==
Lenhart's wife was Shirley Lenhart (1933–2020), who was a nurse and Family Planning Director for Dawson County, Montana. They had three children, Nan, Ned, Kaia. In 1960, Lenhart and his family moved to Glendive, Montana in 1960.

Ralph Lenhart died from complications of COVID-19 in Chippewa Falls, Wisconsin on December 31, 2022. He was 92.

== See also ==
- Montana House of Representatives, District 2
