= Randy Brodehl =

American politician

Member of the Montana House of Representatives from the 9th district
- In office January 5, 2015 – January 7, 2019
- Preceded by: Scott Reichner
- Succeeded by: David Dunn

Member of the Montana House of Representatives from the 7th district
- In office January 3, 2011 – January 5, 2015
- Preceded by: Jon Sonju
- Succeeded by: Frank Garner

Fire Chief of Kalispell Fire Department
- In office July 2008 – 2011
- Succeeded by: Dan Diehl (Acting Fire Chief)

Personal details
- Born: October 13, 1954 (age 71) Stockton, California
- Party: Republican
- Occupation: Business owner, fire chief

Randy Brodehl (born October 13, 1954) is an American businessman, former fire chief, and politician from Montana. Brodehl is a former Republican member of the Montana House of Representatives and current Commissioner of Flathead County in Montana.

== Early life ==
On October 13, 1954, Brodehl was born in Stockton, California.

== Education ==
In 1987, Brodehl earned a Bachelor of Science degree in Fire Service Management from Western Oregon University.

== Career ==
On 1985, Brodehl became a Battalion Chief of Corvallis Fire Department in Oregon, until 2001. In 1987, Brodehl became the owner of Brodehl Farms, until 2001.

In 2001, Brodehl became the Fire Chief of Kalispell Fire Department in Kalispell, Montana, until July 2008.

In 2008, Brodehl became the owner of R&J Enterprises, a custom cabinet maker.

On November 2, 2010, Brodehl won the election and became a Republican member of Montana House of Representatives for District 7. Brodehl defeated Karen Reeves with 72.38% of the votes. On November 6, 2012, as an incumbent, Brodehl won the election and continued serving District 7. Brodehl defeated Diane Frances Taylor-Mahnke with 68.99% of the votes.

In November 2018, Brodehl won the election and became a Commissioner of Flathead County, Montana for District 3.

== Personal life ==
Brodehl's wife is Joyce Brodehl. They have six children. Brodehl and his family live in Kalispell, Montana.

== See also ==
- Montana House of Representatives, District 7
- Montana House of Representatives, District 9
