= Casey Knudsen =

American politician (born 1990)

Speaker pro tempore of the Montana House of Representatives
- In office January 4, 2021 – January 2, 2023
- Preceded by: Wylie Galt
- Succeeded by: Rhonda Knudsen

Member of the Montana House of Representatives from the 33rd district
- Incumbent
- Assumed office January 2, 2017
- Preceded by: Mike Lang

Personal details
- Born: November 9, 1990 (age 35) Havre, Montana, U.S.
- Party: Republican
- Spouse: Megan Knudsen
- Education: Montana State University (BS)

Casey James Knudsen (born November 9, 1990) is an American politician who has served in the Montana House of Representatives from the 33rd district since 2017.

== Biography ==
Knudsen is from Malta, Montana and graduated from Malta High School in 2009. He earned a bachelor's degree in mechanical engineering technology with a minor in aerospace engineering from Montana State University in 2014. After earning his degree, Knudsen returned to Malta to work on his family ranch. He owns an engineering design company.

Montana House of Representatives
Preceded by Wylie Galt	Speaker pro tempore of the Montana House of Representatives; 2021–2023	Succeeded by Rhonda Knudsen
