= George Groesback =

American politician

Member of the Montana House of Representatives from the 74th district
- In office 2004 -

Personal details
- Born: Racine, Wisconsin
- Party: Democratic Party
- Occupation: human resources, pianist

George G. Groesback is a Democratic Party member of the Montana House of Representatives, representing District 74 since 2004.
