= Paul Sliter =

American politician and businessman (1969–2001)

Member of the Montana House of Representatives from the 76th district
- In office 1994–2001
- Succeeded by: Bernie Olson

Personal details
- Born: May 5, 1969 Kalispell, Montana, U.S.
- Died: August 15, 2001 (aged 32) Marysville, Montana, U.S.
- Party: Republican
- Spouse: Elaine Sliter
- Children: 1
- Education: University of Montana (BA)

Paul Sliter (May 5, 1969 – August 15, 2001) was an American politician and businessman who served as a member of the Montana House of Representatives for the 76th district from 1994 until 2001.

== Early life and education ==
Sliter was born in Kalispell, Montana, and graduated from Flathead County High School in 1987. He received his bachelor's degree in political science from University of Montana in 1996. As a college student, Sliter served as an intern in the office of Senator Conrad Burns.

== Career ==
Sliter worked as the sales and credit manager at the Sliter's Ace Lumber and Building Supply in Bigfork, Montana. Sliter served in the Montana House of Representatives from 1994 until his death in 2001. A Republican, he also served as House majority leader.

== Death ==
On August 15, 2001, Silter was involved in a car accident with Shane Hedges when the latter lost control of his vehicle on a dirt road outside of Helena, Montana. Silter died on the scene, whereas Hedges only suffered minor injuries and was released from hospital shortly afterwards. Hedges later pleaded guilty to the negligent homicide of Silter.

== Personal life ==
Sliter lived with his wife and family in Somers, Montana.
