= Derek Skees =

American politician from Montana

Member of the Montana House of Representatives
- In office January 2, 2017 – January 2023
- Preceded by: Albert Olszewski
- Succeeded by: Tanner Smith
- Constituency: 11th District
- In office January 3, 2011 – January 7, 2013
- Preceded by: Mike Jopek
- Succeeded by: Ed Lieser
- Constituency: 4th District

Personal details
- Born: 1968 (age 57–58) Orlando, Florida, U.S.
- Party: Republican
- Spouse: Ronalee Skees
- Children: 3
- Education: University of Central Florida
- Occupation: Construction consultant

Derek Skees (born 1968) is an American politician serving as a Republican member of the Montana House of Representatives from the 11th district. Skees chairs the House Energy, Technology and Federal Relations Committee.

== Career ==
In November 2011, Skees won the election and became a Republican member of Montana House of Representatives for District 4.

In 2013, Skees ran for Montana Commissioner of Securities and Insurance, State Auditor in 2012, but lost to incumbent Monica Lindeen.

In 2014, Skees ran for Montana's 5th Public Service Commissioner seat, but only secured 34% of the vote in the primary.

Since 2016, Skees has been a member of Montana House of Representatives for District 11.

In April 2021, Skees announced that he will seek election to Montana's Public Service Commission, the agency responsible for regulating Montana utilities. He previously sought election to the commission in 2014, though was defeated in the Republican primary election.

In 2021, Skees was the master of ceremonies for the Red Pill Festival held in St. Regis, Montana, which sought to promote anti-government conspiracy theories.

In 2021 Skees, unhappy with a preliminary injunction that blocked three anti-abortion bills, said “we need to throw out Montana’s socialist rag of a constitution.”

== Personal life ==
Skees is married to Ronalee Skees; they reside in Kalispell, Montana.
