= Wylie Galt =

American politician (born 1984)

55th Speaker of the Montana House of Representatives
- In office January 4, 2021 – January 2, 2023
- Preceded by: Greg Hertz
- Succeeded by: Matt Regier

Speaker pro tempore of the Montana House of Representatives
- In office January 7, 2019 – January 4, 2021
- Preceded by: Greg Hertz
- Succeeded by: Casey Knudsen

Member of the Montana House of Representatives
- In office January 2, 2017 – January 2, 2023
- Preceded by: Ryan Osmundson
- Succeeded by: James Bergstrom
- Constituency: 30th district
- In office January 7, 2013 – January 5, 2015
- Preceded by: Harry Klock
- Succeeded by: Chuck Hunter
- Constituency: 83rd district

Personal details
- Born: Errol Wylie Galt; 1984 (age 41–42) Helena, Montana, U.S.
- Party: Republican
- Education: Montana State University (BS)

Errol Wylie Galt (born 1984) is an American politician in the Montana Senate. He served as the Speaker of the Montana House of Representatives. As a Republican member of the Montana House of Representatives, he represented the 30th district from 2017 until he was term limited in 2023. He previously served in the Montana House of Representatives from the 83rd district from 2013 to 2015.

== Early life ==
Galt was born in 1984 in Helena, Montana. He received a degree in agriculture business from Montana State University.

Montana House of Representatives
Preceded by Greg Hertz	Speaker pro tempore of the Montana House of Representatives; 2019–2021	Succeeded by Casey Knudsen
Political offices
Preceded by Greg Hertz	Speaker of the Montana House of Representatives; 2021–2023	Succeeded by Matt Regier
