= Franke Wilmer =

American politician (born 1950)

Member of the Montana House of Representatives from the 63rd district
- In office January 7, 2013 – January 5, 2015
- Preceded by: Jennifer Pomnichowski
- Succeeded by: Zach Brown

Member of the Montana House of Representatives from the 64th district
- In office January 3, 2007 – January 7, 2013
- Preceded by: Larry Jent
- Succeeded by: Tom Woods

Personal details
- Born: December 2, 1950 (age 75) Washington, D.C., U.S.
- Party: Democratic
- Education: Shepherd University; University of Maryland, College Park

Franke Wilmer (born December 2, 1950) is an American academic and a politician. She was a Democratic member of the Montana House of Representatives, representing Districts 63 and 64 from 2007 to 2015. Before first running for office in 2006, Wilmer was appointed to chair the Montana Human Rights Commission by Governor Schweitzer in 2005. She received both a master's and PhD from the University of Maryland in 1990 and is currently professor emerita of political science at Montana State University.

== Early life, education, and academic career ==
Wilmer was born in 1950 in Washington, D.C., to Marion and Bud Wilmer. Her father was a bricklayer from Baltimore and her mother was a nurse from Terry, Montana, and Denton, Maryland. In the 1970s and 1980s, she was a single mother raising her daughter while working various jobs and earning three college degrees. Her jobs during this decade include waitress, carpenter, middle school substitute teacher, assistant professor, and research assistant. She graduated with a B.S. in political science and economics from Shepherd University in 1981. She got a master's degree in political science, specializing in international relations, from the University of Maryland in 1985 and a PhD in 1990.

After earning her degrees, she became an assistant professor at the University of South Carolina at Spartanburg for a year. In 1991, she was then hired by Montana State University where she was tenured, promoted to full professor and retired in 2021. In 1991, she was a co-founder of the Gallatin Human Rights Task Force. She became an associate professor in 1996 and full professor and head of the political science department in 2001 and again 2018-2021.

== Early political career ==
She has written four books, numerous articles, and been invited to be guest lecturer across the world. She conducted field research in Yugoslavia during the war and Dayton Peace Accords and traveled to Israel and Palestine 6 times between 2016 and 2023 where she interviewed peace activists on both sides. In 2005, Democratic Governor Brian Schweitzer appointed her to become Chair the Montana Human Rights Commission, where she served for one year.

== Montana House of Representatives ==
=== Elections ===
In 2006, incumbent Democratic State Representative Larry Jent, of Montana's 64th House District, decided to retire to run for a seat in the Montana Senate. Wilmer ran for the open House seat and won the June Democratic primary with 72% of the vote. In the general election, she defeated Jim Klug 57%-43%. She won re-election in 2008 with 59% of the vote and 2010 with 55% of the vote.

=== Tenure ===
She was elected to as Speaker Pro Tempore of the legislature in 2009. The Vietnam Veterans of America Foundation-Montana Council selected her as "Legislator of the Year" in 2011. During her tenure as a legislator she served as the Legislative Liaison to the Board of investments and on the Environmental Quality Council.

=== Committee assignments ===
- House Education Committee
- House Legislative Administration Committee
- House State Administration and Veterans Affairs Committee
- House Capital Financial Advisory Committee (2008)
- Legislative Liaison to Montana Board of Investments (2011–2012)
- House Fish, Wildlife, and Parks Committee, Vice Chair 2013

== 2012 congressional election ==
In February 2011, Wilmer was the first candidate from either party to announce her candidacy for Montana's at-large congressional district in the U.S. House of Representatives in 2012. Wilmer was endorsed by the National Women's Political Caucus She finished second of 6 candidates in the Democratic primary, with 14,836 votes (18.4%).

== Personal life ==
Wilmer lived in the city of Bozeman, Montana, from 1991 to 2021. She has one daughter and four grandchildren. After retiring from Montana State University in 2021, she moved to Denver for three years and then to Asheville, North Carolina, where she lives with her husband.

== Publications ==
- The Indigenous Voice in World Politics (Sage 1993)
- The Social Construction of Man, the State and War: Identity, Conflict and Violence in Former Yugoslavia (Routledge 2002)
- Human Rights in International Politics: An Introduction (Lynne Rienner 2015).
- Breaking Cycles of Violence in Israel and Palestine: Empathy and Peacemaking in the Middle East (Rowman and Littlefield 2021).
