= Carmine Mowbray =

American politician

Member of the Montana Senate from the 6th district
- In office 2011 - present

Personal details
- Born: 9 February 1953 (age 73) Seattle, Washington
- Party: Republican
- Occupation: former newspaper owner, politician

Carmine Mowbray is a Republican Senator in the Montana Legislature. She was appointed on January 20, 2011, to Senate District 6, representing Polson, Montana. She was co-owner of Western Publishing Company from 1976 to 1989 and the Lake County Leader from 1981 to 2000.
