= Larry Jent =

American politician (born 1951)

Member of the Montana Senate from the 32nd district
- In office January 3, 2007 – January 5, 2015

Member of the Montana House of Representatives from the 64th district
- In office January 3, 2005 – January 3, 2007
- Preceded by: Ron Erickson
- Succeeded by: Franke Wilmer

Member of the Montana House of Representatives from the 29th district
- In office 2001–2005
- Succeeded by: Edward Butcher

Personal details
- Born: December 20, 1951 (age 74) Nashville, Tennessee
- Party: Democratic Party
- Education: United States Military Academy, University of Colorado Boulder
- Profession: attorney

Larry Jent (born December 20, 1951) is a politician and a former Democratic member of the Montana Legislature. He served in the Montana House of Representatives from 2001 to 2007, and served in the Montana Senate from 2007 to 2015.

== Early life, education, and early career ==
Jent was born in 1951 in Nashville, Tennessee. He earned his BS from United States Military Academy in 1973 and went on to receive his JD from the University of Colorado Law School in 1983. Jent has served in the Montana Army National Guard. He was a Fishing Guide for Bud Lilly's Trout Shop/Ray's Tackle Shop from 1980 to 1983 and then a Sole Practitioner from 1983 to 1987. He has been Partner for Williams and Jent, Limited Liability Partnership since 1987.

== 1996 congressional election ==
In 1996, incumbent Democrat U.S. Congressman Pat Williams of Montana's at-large congressional district decided to retire. Jent was one of four Democrat candidates to run for the seat. Former State Senator Bill Yellowtail won the Democratic primary with 56% of the vote while Jent ranked last with just 10% of the vote.

== Montana legislature ==
=== Elections ===
In 2000, Jent was elected to the Montana House of Representatives to the Bozeman-based 29th House District. He defeated Republican Sandra Lee Smiley 66%-33%. In the 2000 U.S. Senate election, Democrat Brian Schweitzer carried the district with 65% of the vote. In 2002, he was re-elected with 69% against Dustin L. Stewart. After redistricting in 2004, Jent ran in the newly redrawn 64th House District and defeated Republican Page Lutes with 56% of the vote.

In 2006, he decided to retire from his seat to run for the Montana Senate. In the Bozeman-based 32nd Senate District, he defeated Republican Art Wittich 56%-44%. In 2010, he won re-election to a second term defeating Republican Michael B. Comstock 54%-46%.

=== Committee assignments ===
- Fish and Game
- Judiciary
- State Administration

== 2012 gubernatorial election ==
In April 2011, Jent filed paperwork to run for Governor of Montana, but dropped out in March 2012, months before the primary.

== 2016 Attorney General election ==
Jent ran for Attorney General of Montana. He was unopposed in the Democratic primary and lost in a landslide in the general election with 32% of the vote, to the incumbent Tim Fox's 68%.
