= Albert Olszewski =

American politician from Montana

Al Olszewski

Member of the Montana Senate from the 6th district
- In office January 2, 2017 – January 4, 2021
- Preceded by: Janna Taylor
- Succeeded by: Greg Hertz

Member of the Montana House of Representatives from the 11th district
- In office January 5, 2015 – January 2, 2017
- Preceded by: Greg Hertz
- Succeeded by: Derek Skees

Personal details
- Born: August 26, 1962 (age 64) Great Falls, Montana, U.S.
- Party: Republican
- Spouse: Nancee
- Children: 6
- Education: Carroll College (BA); University of Washington (MD)

Military service
- Allegiance: United States
- Branch/service: United States Air Force
- Rank: Major

Albert Olszewski (born August 26, 1962) is an American orthopedic surgeon and former state legislator. He served as a Republican member of both the Montana Senate and Montana House of Representatives. He ran unsuccessful campaigns for the U.S. Senate in 2018, governor in 2020, and U.S. House of Representatives in 2022. In addition, he also was a candidate for lieutenant governor in 2012 on a ticket with Montana transportation director Jim Lynch. He and Lynch lost in all 4 Republican primaries.

== Early life and education ==
He graduated from Charles M. Russell High School in 1980. He received a Bachelor of Arts in biology at Carroll College in 1984 and a Doctor of Medicine from University of Washington School of Medicine in 1988. He served for 13 years in the United States Air Force, becoming a surgeon and rising to the rank of major. While a surgeon in the Air Force, he treated soldiers during the Gulf War.

== Campaigns ==
=== 2018 United States Senate election ===
In 2018, Olszewski sought election to the United States Senate, but he was defeated in the primary election.

=== 2020 Montana gubernatorial election ===
In 2020, Olszewski selected Kenneth Bogner to be his running mate in his bid to become governor of Montana. The two were defeated in the primary election by Greg Gianforte and Kristen Juras.

=== 2022 congressional election ===
On July 1, 2021, Olszewski announced his candidacy for Montana's 2nd congressional district, a new seat created after the 2020 United States census, even though the district's boundaries have yet to be drawn.

== Electoral history ==
=== Montana House of Representatives ===
2014 Montana State House 11th District Republican Primary
Party	Candidate	Votes	%
Republican	Al Olszewski	917	52.01%
Republican	Mike Hebert	846	47.99%
Total votes		1,763	100.00%
Majority		71	4.03%

2014 Montana State House 11th District General Election
Party	Candidate	Votes	%
Republican	Al Olszewski	2,755	78.07%
Democratic	Kim E. Fleming	774	21.93%
Total votes		3,529	100.00%
Majority		1,981	56.13%

=== Montana Senate ===
2016 Montana State Senate District 6 Republican primary
Party	Candidate	Votes	%
Republican	Al Olszewski	3,124	100.00%

2016 Montana State Senate 6th District General Election
Party	Candidate	Votes	%
Republican	Al Olszewski	7,370	72.03%
Democratic	Rolf Harmsen	2,862	27.97%
Total votes		10,232	44.06%
Majority		4,508	56.13%

=== 2018 United States Senate election ===
Results by county Map legend: Rosendale—60–70%; Rosendale—50–60%; Rosendale—40–50%; Rosendale—30–40%; Rosendale—<30%; Rosendale/Fagg tie—30–40%; Fagg—30–40%; Fagg—40–50%; Fagg—50–60%; Olszewski—30–40%; Olszewski—40–50%

Republican primary results
Party	Candidate	Votes	%
Republican	Matt Rosendale	51,859	33.82%
Republican	Russ Fagg	43,465	28.34%
Republican	Troy Downing	29,341	19.13%
Republican	Al Olszewski	28,681	18.70%
Total votes		153,346	100.00%

=== 2020 Montana gubernatorial election ===
Results by county Gianforte: Gianforte—70–80%; Gianforte—60–70%; Gianforte—50–60%; Gianforte—40–50%; Fox: Fox—40–50%; Fox—50–60%

Republican primary results
Party	Candidate	Votes	%
Republican	Greg Gianforte	119,247	53.44%
Republican	Tim Fox	60,823	27.26%
Republican	Albert Olszewski	43,080	19.30%
Total votes		223,150	100.00%

=== 2022 United States House of Representatives election ===
2022 Republican Primary for U.S. Representative of Montana's 1st Congressional District
Party	Candidate	Votes	%
Republican	Ryan Zinke	35,601	41.70%
Republican	Al Olszewski	33,927	39.74%
Republican	Mary Todd	8,915	10.44%
Republican	Matt Jette	4,973	5.83%
Republican	Mitch Heuer	1,953	2.29%
Total votes		85,369	100.00%
