= Kim Gillan =

American politician from Montana

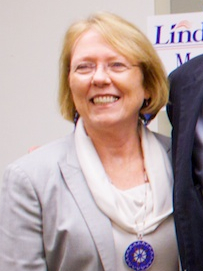
- Kim Gillan in 2012

Member of the Montana House of Representatives from the 11th district
- In office 1997–2004
- Succeeded by: Janna Taylor

Member of the Montana Senate from the 24th district
- In office 2004–2012
- Succeeded by: Roger Webb

Personal details
- Born: December 10, 1951 (age 74) El Cerrito, California, U.S.
- Party: Democratic
- Education: University of California, Los Angeles, Cornell University
- Occupation: business consultant, politician

Kim J. Gillan (born December 10, 1951), is an American politician and former Democratic Party member of the Montana Senate. She represented District 24 from 2004 to 2012. She was unable to run for reelection in 2012 due to Montana's term limits. Earlier she was a member of the Montana House of Representatives from 1996 through 2004. On June 21, 2011, she announced that she would be a candidate for the U.S. House of Representatives for the open seat in Montana's at-large congressional district that was available in the 2012 election due to incumbent Denny Rehberg's decision to run against U.S. Senator Jon Tester. Gillan was defeated by Republican businessman Steve Daines in the November 2012 general election.

== See also ==
- Montana House of Representatives, District 11
