= Jon Sonju =

American politician

Member of the Montana Senate from the 4th district
- In office January 2011 – January 2015
- Preceded by: Gregory D. Barkus
- Succeeded by: Mark Blasdel

Member of the Montana House of Representatives from the 7th district
- In office January 2005 – January 2011
- Preceded by: Monica Lindeen
- Succeeded by: Randy Brodehl

Personal details
- Born: December 26, 1975 (age 50) Kalispell, Montana, U.S.
- Party: Republican
- Spouse: Tania Sonju
- Education: Montana State University, Billings
- Occupation: Politician

Jon Sonju (born December 26, 1975) is a former member of the Montana Senate. He is a Republican from Senate District 4, representing Kalispell, Montana, elected in 2011. He served as a State Senator until 2015. He previously served in the Montana House of Representatives from 2005 to 2010.

== See also ==
- Montana House of Representatives, District 7

Montana House of Representatives
Preceded by Monica Lindeen	Member of the Montana House of Representatives from the 7th district January 2005–January 2011	Succeeded by Randy Brodehl
Montana Senate
Preceded by Gregory D. Barkus	Member of the Montana Senate from the 4th district January 2011–January 2015	Succeeded by Mark Blasdel
Party political offices
Preceded by Steve Daines	Republican nominee for Lieutenant Governor of Montana; 2012	Succeeded by Lesley Robinson
