= Tanner Smith (politician) =

American politician

Member of the Montana House of Representatives from the 11th district
- Incumbent
- Assumed office January 2023
- Preceded by: Derek Skees

Personal details
- Party: Republican

Tanner J. Smith is an American politician. He serves in the Montana House of Representatives for District 11.

Smith is from Stevensville, Montana. He is the owner of Tanner J. Smith Construction and served on the board of trustees for the Somers Lakeside School District.

With Derek Skees, the member of the Montana House of Representatives for District 11, not running for reelection in 2022, Smith ran to succeed him, citing the opening of recreational cannabis dispensaries in his district and his desire to further regulate them as his motivation. Smith defeated Ronalee Skees and Devon Decker in the Republican Party primary election.

In June 2023, Smith announced that he would run for the Republican nomination for governor of Montana in the 2024 election, challenging incumbent Greg Gianforte. One year later, Smith lost the primary to Gianaforte, gaining only 24.8% of the vote.
