= Verdell Jackson =

American politician (born 1911)

Member of the Montana House of Representatives from the 79th district
- In office January 2003 – December 2004
- Succeeded by: Dave Gallik

Member of the Montana House of Representatives from the 6th district
- In office January 2005 – December 2006
- Preceded by: Veronica Small-Eastman
- Succeeded by: William Beck Sr.

Member of the Montana Senate from the 5th district
- In office January 2007 – December 2014
- Succeeded by: Bob Keenan

Personal details
- Born: April 1, 1941 (age 85) Cortez, Colorado
- Party: Republican
- Spouse: Linda Jackson
- Children: 1
- Occupation: Educator, rancher, politician

Verdell Jackson (born April 1, 1941) is an American educator, rancher and politician from Montana. He is a former Republican member of the Montana House of Representatives and the Montana State Senate from District 5, representing Kalispell, Montana.

== Early life and education ==
Jackson was born in Cortez, Colorado.

In 1964, Jackson earned a Bachelor of Science degree from the University of Colorado, followed by a Master of Arts degree from Arizona State University in 1970.

== Career ==
In 1964, Jackson became a high school teacher, a profession he held until 1970. From 1970-72 he worked as an instructor at the University of Alaska. In 1991, he became a superintendent at Flathead Christian School, until 1996. Jackson was also a rancher.

In 1998, Jackson began serving in the Montana House of Representatives.

On November 5, 2002, Jackson won the election unopposed and became a Republican member of Montana House of Representatives for District 79.

On November 2, 2004, Jackson won the election and became a Republican member of Montana House of Representatives for District 6. He defeated Shannon Hanson with 64.71% of the votes.

On November 7, 2006, Jackson won the election and became a Republican member of the Montana Senate for District 5. He defeated Ric Smith with 59.54% of the votes.

== Personal life ==
Jackson's wife is Linda Jackson. They have one child. Jackson and his family live in Kalispell, Montana.

== See also ==
- Montana House of Representatives, District 6
