= Thomas C. Bach =

American politician (1853–1914)

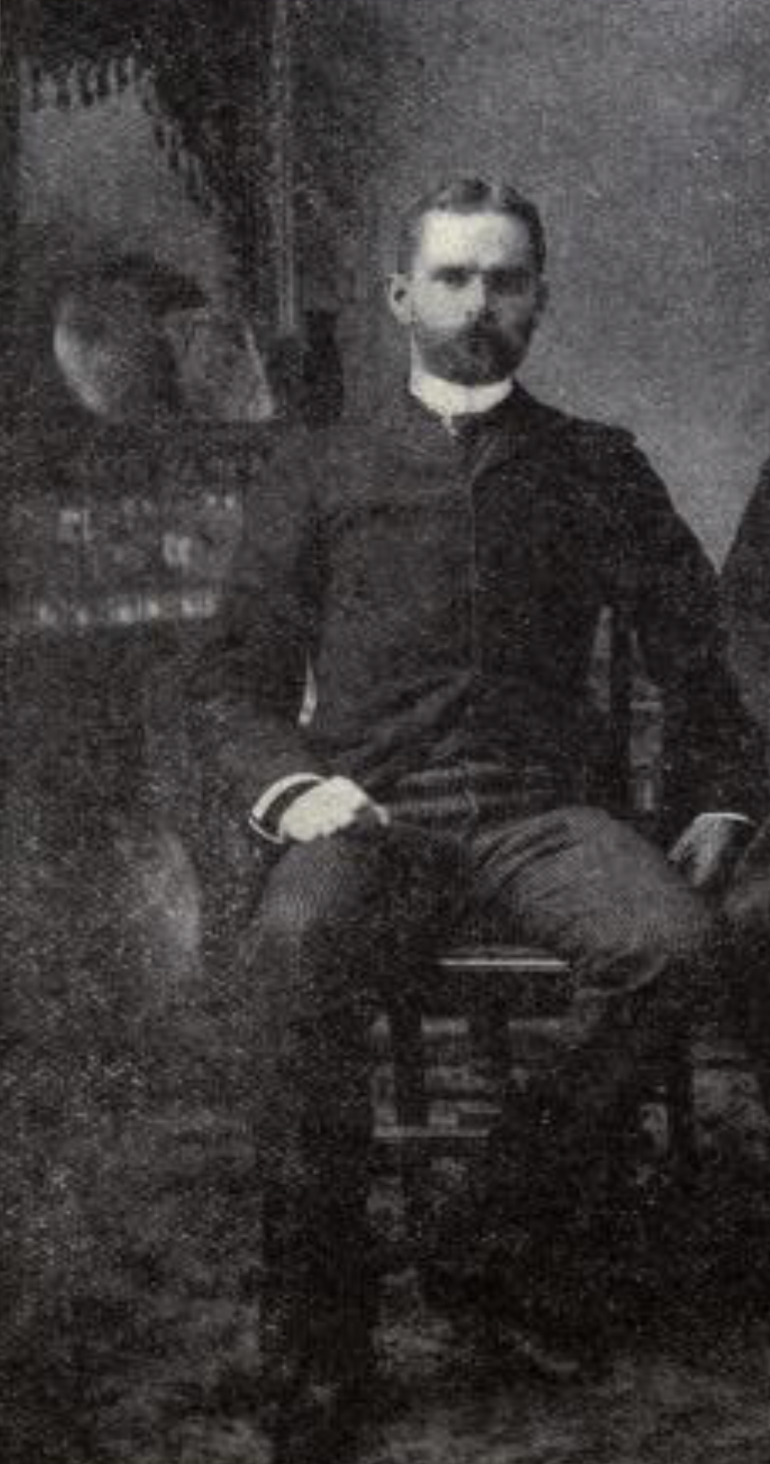
Thomas C. Bach

Thomas Cumming Bach (October 10, 1853 – October 29, 1914) was an associate justice of the Montana Territorial Supreme Court. He was appointed by President Grover Cleveland on August 9, 1887, to become the fourth justice, a role that had been created by the United States Congress one month prior.

== Early life and education ==
Thomas was born to John and Elizabeth Bach in Brooklyn on October 10, 1853, the seventh of 12 children. In the early 1860s, the family moved to Manhattan, where the Bach family's wealth afforded them an opulent lifestyle. Young Bach graduated from Columbia College in 1875 with the degree of A.B. and in 1877 he completed his studies in the law department of the School of Arts graduating with the degrees of A.M. and LL.B.

== Career ==
In 1884, after seven years in the private practice of law in New York, Bach moved to the Montana Territory, where his younger brother, Edmund William Bach, had established a successful accounting practice. After a brief stay in Bozeman, he moved to Butte, Montana. There, he formed a law practice with Judge DeWitte.

On August 9, 1886, President Grover Cleveland appointed Bach as a judge of the Supreme Court of the Territory of Montana to serve in the newly created fourth position on the territorial supreme court. Among the many cases Bach wrote opinions on was Weibold vs. Davis. Bach held the office until 1889, when Montana gained statehood. He then practiced law in Helena, Montana.

In 1892, Bach was elected a member of the Montana State Legislature and was chairman of the Judiciary Committee. He served as a district judge for the First Judicial District from 1907 to 1909.

== Personal life ==
Bach was married to Kathryn Child (1863–1926), a native of San Francisco, California. They had two children, Dorothy (1891–1968) and Marjorie (1892–1972). Thomas Bach died in Pasadena, California on October 29, 1914, at the age of 61.

== Bibliography ==
- History of Montana Joaquin Miller, Chicago: Lewis Publishing Co., 1894.
