= Gerald Bennett =

American politician from Montana

Member of the Montana House of Representatives from the 1st district
- In office January 5, 2009 – January 2, 2017
- Preceded by: Ralph Heinert
- Succeeded by: Steve Gunderson

Personal details
- Born: August 15, 1956 (age 69) Fairbanks, Alaska, U.S.
- Party: Republican
- Spouse: Malia Bennett
- Children: 2
- Other names: Gerald A. Bennett, Jerry Bennett

Gerald 'Jerry' Bennett (born August 15, 1956) was an American politician and businessman who was a member of the Montana House of Representatives for the 1st district from 2009 to 2017.

== Early life ==
Bennett was born in Fairbanks, Alaska. His grandfather and father lived in Lincoln County, Montana. In 1974, Bennett graduated from Libby High School in Libby, Montana.

== Career ==
Bennett has worked for companies including St. Regis Paper Co., W.R. Grace, Taylor Logging, Sunrise Rental, Valley Motor and S.J. Orr Service. As a businessman, he owned and operated a septic service and portable toilet rental business.

On November 4, 2008, Bennett won the election and became a Republican member of Montana house of representatives for District 1, which includes Libby. He defeated Eileen J. Carney and Freeman W. Johnson with 59.65% of the votes. On November 2, 2010, as an incumbent, he won the election and continued representing District 1 by defeating Eileen J. Carney with 71.34% of the votes. On November 6, 2012, as an incumbent, he won the election unopposed. On November 4, 2014, he won the election again and defeated Donald Coats with 75.68% of the votes.

Bennett was a majority whip during the 2015–2016 session.

On November 8, 2016, Bennett was elected as a member of Lincoln County Commission for the 2nd district. He defeated Rhoda Cargill.

== Personal life ==
Bennett's wife is Malia Bennett. They have two children, Coby and Amy. Bennett and his family live in Libby, Montana.

== See also ==
- Montana House of Representatives, District 1
