= Donald Roberts (politician) =

American politician

Member of the Montana House of Representatives from the 10th district
- In office 2003–2004
- Succeeded by: Bernie Olson

Member of the Montana House of Representatives from the 56th district
- In office 2005–2012

Personal details
- Born: July 18, 1948 (age 78)
- Party: Republican

Donald Roberts is a Republican member of the Montana Legislature. He was elected to House District 56 which represents a portion of the Billings area.
