= Veronica Small-Eastman =

American politician

Member of the Montana House of Representatives from the 42nd district
- In office 2002 –

Personal details
- Party: Democratic Party
- Education: Montana State University
- Profession: educator

Veronica Small-Eastman is a Democratic Party member of the Montana House of Representatives, representing District 42 since 2002.

She is a member of the Crow Tribe of Montana.
