= Neil Duram =

American politician

Member of the Montana House of Representatives
- Incumbent
- Assumed office January 6, 2025
- Preceded by: Steve Gunderson
- Constituency: 2nd district (2018–2025); 1st district (2025–present)

Personal details
- Born: 1969 (age 56–57)
- Party: Republican
- Education: University of Montana

Military service
- Allegiance: United States; State of Washington
- Branch/service: Air National Guard

Neil Duram is an American politician from Montana. Duram is a Republican member of Montana House of Representatives representing District 1.

== Career ==
On November 6, 2018, Duram won the election unopposed and became a Republican Representative for District 2. In 2020 he defeated Lori Ramesz to retain his seat. For the 2022 election he again ran unopposed.

Due to redistricting following the US census Duram ran for District 1 in the 2024 elections. He defeated Democratic challenger Dakota Adams 5,541 to 1,388.

== Personal life ==
Duram lives in Eureka, Montana. He previously was a Montana Highway Patrol trooper and is the chief of the Eureka Police Department.

== See also ==
- Montana House of Representatives, District 1
