= Wendy Warburton =

American politician

Member of the Montana House of Representatives from the 34th district
- In office 2011 to present

Personal details
- Born: January 17, 1976 (age 50) Malta, Montana
- Party: Republican

Wendy Warburton (born January 17, 1976) is a Republican member of the Montana Legislature. She was elected to House District 34 which represents the Havre, Montana area.
