= Monica Tranel =

American rower, lawyer, and political candidate

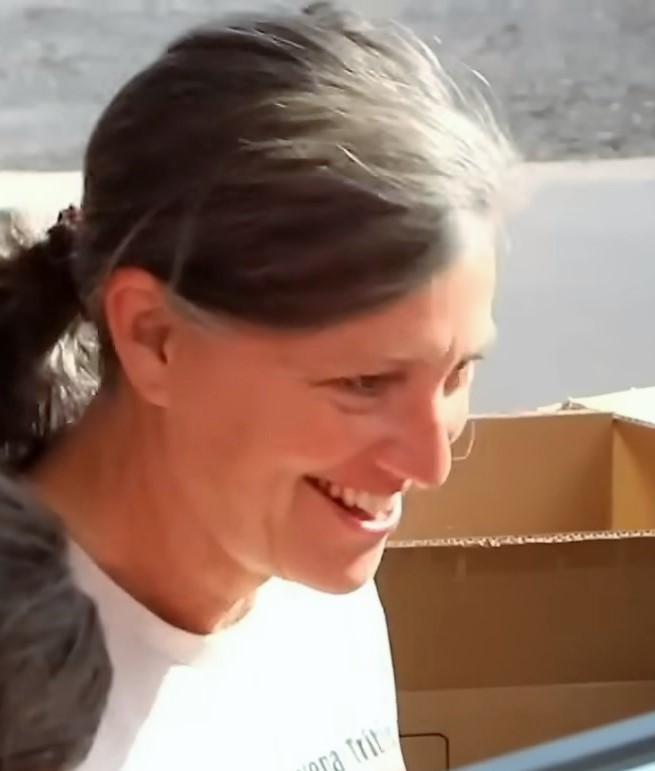
- Tranel on Vlogbrothers, 2022

Personal details
- Born: Monica Joan Tranel; 1966 (age 59–60) Big Horn, Wyoming, U.S.
- Party: Republican (before 2006); Democratic (2006–present)
- Spouse: Greg Lind
- Education: Gonzaga University (BA); Rutgers University, Camden (JD)
- Website: Campaign website
- Sports career
Medal record
Women's rowing
Representing United States
World Rowing Championships
| Bronze medal – third place | 1993 Račice | W4x |
| Silver medal – second place | 1993 Račice | W8+ |
| Silver medal – second place | 1994 Indianapolis | W8+ |
| Silver medal – second place | 1994 Indianapolis | W4- |
| Gold medal – first place | 1995 Tampere | W8+ |
| Silver medal – second place | 1999 St. Catharines | W8+ |

Monica Tranel (born 1966) is an American rower, lawyer, and political candidate. She competed at the 1996 and 2000 Summer Olympics. Tranel ran unsuccessfully for Montana's 1st congressional district as a member of the Democratic Party in 2022 and 2024.

In February 2026, Tranel announced her candidacy for the Montana House of Representatives, seeking to represent the 92nd district in the 2026 election.

== Early life and education ==
Tranel was born in Big Horn, Wyoming, and grew up across Montana, including in Miles City, Ashland, and Billings. She graduated from Billings Central Catholic High School, where she competed in basketball and track.

At Gonzaga University, Tranel joined the school's rowing team. In 1988, Tranel graduated from Gonzaga with a Bachelor of Arts. In 1991, she earned her Juris Doctor from Rutgers University–Camden.

== Athletic career ==
=== Championship achievements ===
Monica Tranel represented the United States at five World Rowing Championships between 1993 and 2000. Tranel won a bronze medal for the quadruple sculls as part of the women's team at the 1993 World Rowing Championships in Račice, along with a silver medal in women's eight. Tranel competed in the two thousand meters rowing at the 1995 World Rowing Championships as part of the US Women's eight Olympic rowing team, who went on to win gold. She finished fourth in the women's eight at the 1996 Summer Olympics.

=== Legacy ===
The University of Montana named one of their 40-foot (12 m) four-seat competition boats "The Tranel" in her honor. In 2025, Tranel was elected to the National Rowing Hall of Fame.

== Political and legal career ==
=== Local and state-level offices ===
In 2004, Tranel unsuccessfully sought election as a Republican to the Montana Public Service Commission while working as a staff attorney at the commission.

After working at the commission for four years, Tranel worked for Republican Senator Conrad Burns in Washington, D.C., for a short time, before returning to Butte, Montana, in 2005 and opening a private practice in 2006. She later left the Republican Party.

From 2010 to 2013, Tranel served as a trustee for the Montana Bar Association. In 2015, Tranel again ran for office, this time for the Helena City Commission, as a Democrat.

In 2020, as a Democrat, Tranel again sought election to the Montana Public Service Commission. She was defeated in the general election by Montana Senator Jennifer Fielder, a Republican.

In February 2026, as a supervisor attorney at the public defender's office in Missoula, Tranel submitted a burglary defense case filing composed with the help of large language model tools. After the county prosecutor flagged the filing as AI-generated without disclosure, Tranel withdrew it. Concerns had been raised in 2025 about insufficient fact-checking of, and possible AI hallucinations contained in such documents, and the county policy subsequently required disclosure.

=== U.S. House of Representatives ===
Tranel was the Democratic candidate for Montana's 1st congressional district, running against Ryan Zinke and John Lamb. During the lead-up to the 2022 United States House of Representatives elections in Montana, American vlogger Hank Green interviewed Tranel in Missoula and Bozeman. Tranel lost to Zinke in the general election, receiving 46.5% of the vote to Zinke's 49.6%.

In July 2023, Tranel announced her bid for Montana's first congressional district in 2024. In a reprise of the 2022 election, she lost to Zinke with 44.6% of the vote to Representative Zinke's 52.3%.

=== Montana Legislature ===
In February 2026, Tranel announced she was running for the Montana state legislature, representing House District 92.

== Personal life ==
Tranel has nine siblings. Starting in 2001, she lived in Helena, Montana, for several years. She currently lives in Missoula with her husband, former state senator Greg Lind.
