= Rowlie Hutton =

American politician

Member of the Montana Senate from the 17th district
- In office 2011 to present
- Preceded by: Bob Bergren

Personal details
- Born: Turner, Montana
- Party: Republican
- Occupation: Pastor

Rowlie Hutton is a Republican member of the Montana Legislature. He was elected for Senate District 17, representing Havre, Montana, for the 2011 term. On February 2, 2011 Hutton resigned effective the end of the current session to take a pastor position in Omaha, Nebraska. Hutton volunteers for the Special Olympics and has participated in the Polar Plunge fundraiser for special needs children.
