= David Wanzenried =

American politician

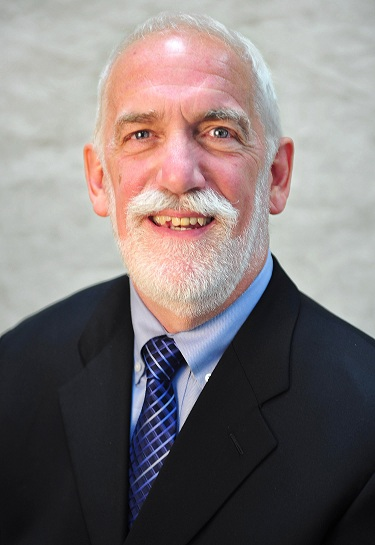

Personal details
- Born: November 20, 1948 (age 77) Upland, California, U.S.
- Party: Democratic
- Education: University of Montana, Missoula

David Wanzenried is a Montana politician and Montana State University Billings instructor. He served as the state senator for the 49th district of Montana, representing parts of the city of Missoula and Missoula County from since 2007 to 2015. He is a member of the Democratic party. Previously, he had been elected to the state House of Representatives for the 92nd district, serving Missoula and also Evergreen, near Kalispell from 1990 to 2004. He served as Montana House Minority leader from 2005 to 2007. Wanzenried ran for the office of governor of Montana in 2012 but withdrew from the race on July 8, 2011.

Wanzenried currently serves as an instructor of political science at Montana State University Billings.
