= Chas Vincent =

American politician

Chas V. Vincent

Member of the Montana Senate from the 1st district
- In office January 3, 2011 – January 7, 2019
- Preceded by: Aubyn Curtiss
- Succeeded by: Mike Cuffe

Member of the Montana House of Representatives from the 2nd district
- In office January 3, 2007 – January 3, 2011
- Succeeded by: Mike Cuffe

Personal details
- Born: July 24, 1977 (age 49) Kalispell, Montana
- Party: Republican
- Education: University of Montana
- Occupation: Logger

Chas V. Vincent (born July 24, 1977) is a Republican State Senator in the Montana Legislature from District 1 representing Libby, Montana. He is a graduate of the University of Montana.

== See also ==
- Montana House of Representatives, District 2
