= Bill Wilson (Montana politician) =

American politician (born 1961)

Member of the Montana Senate
- In office 1993–2001

Member of the Montana House of Representatives
- In office 2003–2011

Personal details
- Born: March 28, 1961 (age 65) Great Falls, Montana, U.S.
- Party: Democratic Party

William F. Wilson (born March 28, 1961) is a politician who was a Democratic member of the Montana House of Representatives from 2003 to 2011. Additionally, he was a member of the Montana Senate from 1993 to 2001.
