= Alan Olson =

American politician

Member of the Montana Senate from the 23rd district
- In office 2011 to present

Personal details
- Born: 24 June 1956 (age 70) Havre, Montana
- Party: Republican
- Spouse: Jean

Alan Olson is a Republican member of the Montana Legislature. He was elected for Senate District 23 in 2010. Previously he served 4 terms in the House of Representatives. Olson previously worked for Halliburton Services and was Chief for Bull Mountain Fire Department.
