= Jon Sesso =

American politician (born 1953)

Minority Leader of the Montana Senate
- In office January 5, 2013 – January 4, 2021
- Preceded by: Carol Williams
- Succeeded by: Jill Cohenour

Member of the Montana Senate from the 37th district
- In office January 2013 – January 4, 2021
- Preceded by: Steve Gallus
- Succeeded by: Ryan Lynch

Minority Leader of the Montana House of Representatives
- In office January 2009 – January 2013
- Preceded by: Chuck Hunter
- Succeeded by: ???

Member of the Montana House of Representatives from the 76th district
- In office 2004–2013
- Preceded by: ???
- Succeeded by: Amanda Curtis

Personal details
- Born: November 15, 1953 (age 72) Racine, Wisconsin, U.S.
- Party: Democratic
- Spouse: Barbara Kornet
- Education: University of Wisconsin, Madison (BA, MA)

Jon C. Sesso (born November 15, 1953) is an American politician of the Democratic Party. He was the Minority Leader of the Montana Senate, representing District 37 from 2013 to 2018. He was previously a member of the Montana House of Representatives, representing District 76, from 2004 to 2013.

== Life and career before politics ==
Jon Sesso was born on November 15, 1953, in Racine, Wisconsin. In 1971, Sesso attended the University of Wisconsin Madison and obtained a bachelor's degree in Communications and a master's degree in Communications and Environmental Studies.

== Political career ==
Since 1991, Sesso has been the Director of the Planning Department in the county of Silver Bow. He is heavily involved with Superfund activities, particularly in regards to the Berkeley Pit.

In 2004, Jon Sesso was elected to the Montana House of Representatives for the state's 76th District. Sesso served on the House Appropriations Committee during his tenure. During the 2011-2012 legislative session, Sesso served as the Minority Leader of the Montana House of Representatives for the Democratic Party.

Sesso was elected to the Montana Senate in 2013 and succeeded Carol Williams as the Minority Leader of the Senate.

Montana Senate
Preceded by Carol Williams	Minority Leader of the Montana Senate; 2013–2021	Succeeded by Jill Cohenour
