= Donald Steinbeisser =

American politician (1935–2020)

Member of the Montana Senate from the 19th district
- In office 2005 to 2012
- Succeeded by: Matthew Rosendale

Personal details
- Born: April 15, 1935 Sidney, Montana, U.S.
- Died: September 12, 2020 (aged 85) Sidney, Montana, U.S.
- Party: Republican
- Spouse(s): Leona, Lia
- Occupation: Rancher, farmer

Donald Steinbeisser (April 15, 1935 – September 12, 2020) was an American politician and Republican member of the Montana Legislature. He served Senate District 19, representing Sidney, Montana from 2005 to 2012. He previously served two terms in the Montana House of Representatives. Due to Montana's term limits, Steinbeisser was ineligible to run in the 2012 election.

Steinbeisser was a farmer, rancher and business owner. He served in the US Army Reserve from 1957 to 1962.
