= Jim Shockley =

American politician

Member of the Montana Senate from the 45th district
- In office 2004 to 2012
- Succeeded by: Fred Thomas

Personal details
- Born: 12 September 1944 (age 82) Mesa, Arizona
- Party: Republican
- Spouse: Marilee
- Education: University of Montana
- Occupation: Lawyer

Jim Shockley was a Republican member of the Montana Legislature. He was elected for Senate District 45, representing the Victor, Montana area, in 2004. Previously he served in the House of Representatives. He was an officer in the US Marine Corps.

In June 2010 Shockley announced his intention to run for Montana Attorney General in the 2012 election. He did not advance past the primaries. He was ineligible to run for re-election for Senate due to Montana's term limits.

== Marine Corps career ==
Shockley joined the Marine Corps in 1968 and retired as a Major in 1990. He served in Vietnam during the Vietnam War and received the Purple Heart for wounds in combat.
