= Tim Callahan (politician) =

American politician

Member of the Montana House of Representatives from the 21st district
- In office 2000 - 2008

Personal details
- Born: February 9, 1955 (age 71) Billings, Montana
- Party: Democratic Party
- Spouse: Ingrid
- Education: University of Montana, Montana State University
- Profession: Juvenile probation officer

Terrence M. "Tim" Callahan was a Democratic Party member of the Montana House of Representatives, representing District 21 from 2000 till 2008. Callahan served as a member of the Appropriations Committee and its Joint Appropriations Subcommittee on Long-Range Planning. A term-limits law prevented him from contesting the 2008 election to the House.
