= Jim Peterson (Montana politician) =

American politician

Jim E. Peterson

Member of the Montana Senate from the 15th district
- In office 2007 - 2015
- Preceded by: Jon Tester
- Succeeded by: Bradley Maxon Hamlett

Personal details
- Born: July 19, 1946 (age 80) Buffalo, Montana
- Party: Republican

Jim E. Peterson is the President of the Senate for the 62nd Montana Legislature. Peterson has served in the Legislature since 2003 as a Republican. He was elected for Senate District 15 in Buffalo, Montana. Peterson is the primary sponsor for a joint bill 21 "Study of eminent domain and just compensation for property."

Peterson has received a varied education. He attended Montana State University to study Animal Science and obtained a Master's in Agriculture from Texas A&M University. He then studied Banking at Southern Methodist University and obtained an MBA in Finance at West Texas State University.
