= Greg Lind =

American politician

Member of the Montana Senate from the 50th district
- In office 2005 - 2008
- Preceded by: Cliff Larsen

Personal details
- Born: March 23, 1957 (age 69) Lawton, Oklahoma
- Party: Democratic
- Spouse: Monica Tranel
- Education: Iowa State University, University of Iowa
- Occupation: Anesthesiologist

Gregor H. Lind is an American anesthesiologist and politician who served as a Democratic member of the Montana Senate, representing District 50 from 2005 through 2008.

Lind currently lives in Missoula, Montana, with his wife Monica Tranel and their three daughters.
