= Mike Jopek =

American politician from Montana

Member of the Montana House of Representatives from the 4th district
- In office 2004–2010
- Succeeded by: Derek Skees

Personal details
- Born: June 9, 1964 (age 62) Missoula, Montana
- Party: Democratic Party
- Spouse: Char
- Occupation: Businessman, farmer, politician

Mike Jopek is a former American politician from Montana. Jopek is a former Democratic Party member of the Montana House of Representatives, representing District 4 since 2004.

== See also ==
- Montana House of Representatives, District 4
