= Vicki Cocchiarella =

American politician

Member of the Montana Senate from the 47th district
- In office 1998 -

Personal details
- Born: December 19, 1949 (age 76) Livingston, Montana
- Party: Democratic Party
- Spouse: Larry
- Education: University of Montana
- Occupation: Business consultant

Vicki J. Cocchiarella is a Democratic Party member of the Montana Senate, representing District 47 since 1998. Earlier she was a member of the Montana House of Representatives from 1989 through 1998, and was House Minority Leader from 1997 through 1998.
