= Dan Weinberg =

American politician

Member of the Montana Senate from the 2nd district
- In office 2005–2009
- Succeeded by: Ryan Zinke

Personal details
- Born: Chicago, Illinois
- Party: Democratic Party
- Education: Hartwick College
- Occupation: Psychologist, farmer, rancher

Dan Weinberg is a former Democratic Party member of the Montana Senate, representing District 2 from 2005 to 2009.

Weinberg is related to Eric Kessler, who founded Arabella Advisors, a for-profit consulting company that advises left-leaning donors and nonprofits about where to give money and serves as the hub of a politically liberal "dark money" network. Weinberg has family money, some of which he used to build a home on a private island on Whitefish Lake and to buy another home within a Kauai luxury community.
