= Libby, Montana =

City in Montana, United States

- City
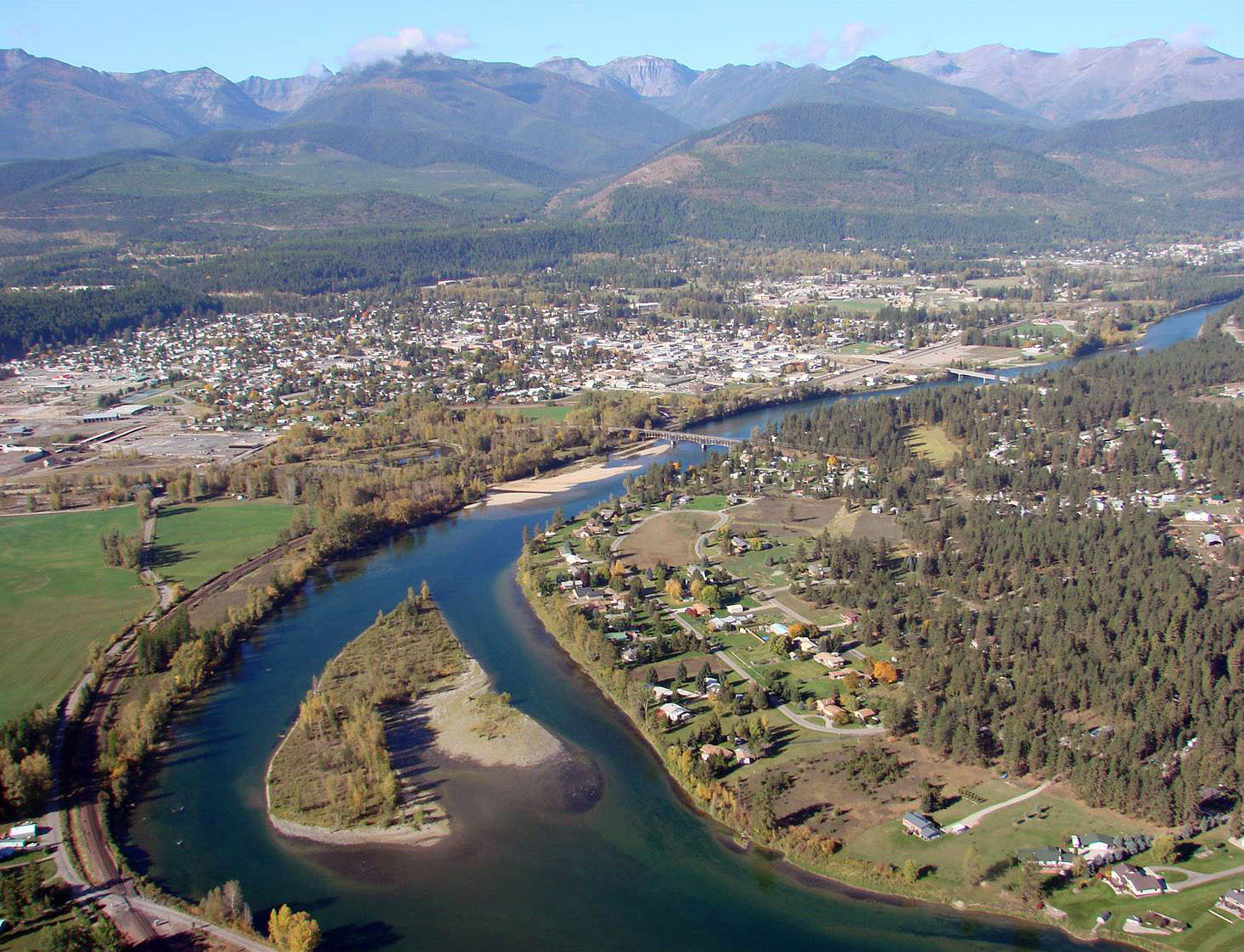
- Looking west-southwest

- Location of Libby, Montana

- Location within Montana Location within the United States
- Coordinates: 48°22′47″N 115°33′17″W
- Country: United States
- State: Montana
- County: Lincoln

Area
  - Total: 1.88 sq mi (4.86 km^{2})
  - Land: 1.84 sq mi (4.77 km^{2})
  - Water: 0.035 sq mi (0.09 km^{2})
- Elevation: 2,103 ft (641 m)

Population (2020)
  - Total: 2,775
  - Density: 1,506.4/sq mi (581.64/km^{2})
- Time zone: UTC-7 (Mountain (MST))
  - Summer (DST): UTC-6 (MDT)
- ZIP code: 59923
- Area code: 406
- FIPS code: 30-43450
- GNIS feature ID: 2410831
- Website: cityoflibby.com

Libby is a city in northwestern Montana, United States and the county seat of Lincoln County. The population was 2,775 at the 2020 census.

Libby suffered from the area's contamination from nearby vermiculite mines contaminated with particularly fragile asbestos, leading to the town's inclusion in the United States Environmental Protection Agency's National Priorities List status in 2002 and Public Health Emergency event in 2009. Most risk was reduced by 2015.

Local natural features, such as the Kootenai Falls, have attracted tourism to the area and have been featured in movies, such as Always (1989), The River Wild (1994) and The Revenant (2015). There is a public school district and a public library, and the town is in-district for Flathead Valley Community College, which operates the Lincoln County Campus there.

== History ==
Continental and alpine glaciers shaped the area's valleys and lakes. The first indigenous peoples arrived at least 8,000 years ago and hunted and gathered for food. The earliest known American settler, David Thompson, arrived in the 1800s, and early American economic activity included "fur trading, railroad construction, mining, and logging." Miners flocked to Libby Creek in 1867. It was deserted by the 1870s. In 1892, with the arrival of the Great Northern Railway, the town moved downstream and the name was shortened from Libbysville to Libby.

== Geography ==
Libby is on U.S. Route 2 at its junction with Montana Highway 37. It is at the confluence of Libby Creek and the Kootenai River.

According to the United States Census Bureau, the city has an area of 1.95 square miles (5.05 km^{2}), of which 1.91 square miles (4.95 km^{2}) is land and 0.04 square miles (0.10 km^{2}) is water. Libby is in the Kootenai National Forest, between the Cabinet Mountains to the south and the Purcell Mountains to the north, the town lies in the heart of the Kootenai Valley along the Kootenai River, and downstream from the Libby Dam. Libby is at an elevation of 2,096 feet (640 m) above sea level.

Libby experiences a continental climate (Köppen Dfb).

Climate data for Libby, Montana, 1991–2020 normals, extremes 1895–2022
Month	Jan	Feb	Mar	Apr	May	Jun	Jul	Aug	Sep	Oct	Nov	Dec	Year
Record high °F (°C)	56 (13)	65 (18)	75 (24)	90 (32)	102 (39)	107 (42)	110 (43)	109 (43)	105 (41)	89 (32)	73 (23)	65 (18)	110 (43)
Mean maximum °F (°C)	45.3 (7.4)	51.6 (10.9)	65.7 (18.7)	78.4 (25.8)	88.2 (31.2)	94.1 (34.5)	99.9 (37.7)	99.3 (37.4)	91.1 (32.8)	75.7 (24.3)	54.6 (12.6)	43.1 (6.2)	101.5 (38.6)
Mean daily maximum °F (°C)	34.4 (1.3)	40.9 (4.9)	51.8 (11.0)	61.5 (16.4)	72.6 (22.6)	79.6 (26.4)	89.3 (31.8)	89.6 (32.0)	77.6 (25.3)	58.5 (14.7)	41.1 (5.1)	32.8 (0.4)	60.8 (16.0)
Daily mean °F (°C)	27.9 (−2.3)	31.5 (−0.3)	39.3 (4.1)	46.6 (8.1)	55.6 (13.1)	62.5 (16.9)	69.2 (20.7)	68.5 (20.3)	59.2 (15.1)	46.2 (7.9)	34.7 (1.5)	27.3 (−2.6)	47.4 (8.5)
Mean daily minimum °F (°C)	21.5 (−5.8)	22.2 (−5.4)	26.8 (−2.9)	31.7 (−0.2)	38.7 (3.7)	45.4 (7.4)	49.2 (9.6)	47.4 (8.6)	40.9 (4.9)	33.8 (1.0)	28.3 (−2.1)	21.8 (−5.7)	34.0 (1.1)
Mean minimum °F (°C)	−0.5 (−18.1)	2.4 (−16.4)	12.8 (−10.7)	21.6 (−5.8)	25.9 (−3.4)	33.3 (0.7)	38.6 (3.7)	36.7 (2.6)	28.6 (−1.9)	20.3 (−6.5)	12.0 (−11.1)	2.9 (−16.2)	−9.7 (−23.2)
Record low °F (°C)	−46 (−43)	−37 (−38)	−20 (−29)	−5 (−21)	12 (−11)	24 (−4)	30 (−1)	26 (−3)	13 (−11)	−7 (−22)	−19 (−28)	−39 (−39)	−46 (−43)
Average precipitation inches (mm)	1.92 (49)	1.29 (33)	1.73 (44)	1.14 (29)	1.66 (42)	2.04 (52)	0.91 (23)	0.74 (19)	1.09 (28)	1.82 (46)	2.29 (58)	2.52 (64)	19.15 (487)
Average snowfall inches (cm)	11.8 (30)	5.4 (14)	3.8 (9.7)	0.2 (0.51)	0.0 (0.0)	0.0 (0.0)	0.0 (0.0)	0.0 (0.0)	0.0 (0.0)	0.3 (0.76)	6.3 (16)	20.4 (52)	48.2 (122.97)
Average extreme snow depth inches (cm)	12.3 (31)	10.3 (26)	6.2 (16)	0.4 (1.0)	0.0 (0.0)	0.0 (0.0)	0.0 (0.0)	0.0 (0.0)	0.0 (0.0)	0.6 (1.5)	3.5 (8.9)	11.2 (28)	14.6 (37)
Average precipitation days (≥ 0.01 in)	14.3	10.0	11.9	9.8	10.4	11.6	6.8	5.3	7.2	10.1	13.4	14.0	124.8
Average snowy days (≥ 0.1 in)	7.2	4.6	2.2	0.1	0.0	0.0	0.0	0.0	0.0	0.1	2.3	7.7	24.2
Source 1: NOAA
Source 2: National Weather Service (mean maxima/minima, snow depth 1981–2010)

== Demographics ==
Historical population
Census	Pop.	Note	%±
1890	260		—
1900	296		13.8%
1910	630		112.8%
1920	1,522		141.6%
1930	1,752		15.1%
1940	1,837		4.9%
1950	2,401		30.7%
1960	2,828		17.8%
1970	3,286		16.2%
1980	2,748		−16.4%
1990	2,532		−7.9%
2000	2,626		3.7%
2010	2,628		0.1%
2020	2,775		5.6%
source: U.S. Decennial Census

=== 2020 census ===
As of the 2020 census, Libby had a population of 2,775. The population density was 1,506.5 inhabitants per square mile (581.7/km^{2}). There were 1,428 housing units at an average density of 775.2 per square mile (299.3/km^{2}).

The median age was 48.7 years. 20.1% of residents were under the age of 18 and 26.5% of residents were 65 years of age or older. For every 100 females, there were 97.1 males, and for every 100 females age 18 and over, there were 95.2 males age 18 and over. 99.9% of residents lived in urban areas, while 0.1% lived in rural areas.

There were 1,297 households and 644 families in Libby. Of all households, 21.7% had children under the age of 18 living in them, 35.0% were married-couple households, 24.0% were households with a male householder and no spouse or partner present, and 33.5% were households with a female householder and no spouse or partner present. About 43.5% of all households were made up of individuals, and 21.7% had someone living alone who was 65 years of age or older.

Of the 1,428 housing units, 9.2% were vacant. The homeowner vacancy rate was 1.9% and the rental vacancy rate was 7.1%.

Racial composition as of the 2020 census
Race	Number	Percent
White	2,512	90.5%
Black or African American	2	0.1%
American Indian and Alaska Native	34	1.2%
Asian	30	1.1%
Native Hawaiian and Other Pacific Islander	5	0.2%
Some other race	24	0.9%
Two or more races	168	6.1%
Hispanic or Latino (of any race)	76	2.7%

The Non-Hispanic White population was 89.6%.

=== Demographic estimates ===
The average household size was 2.1 and the average family size was 3.0. The percent of those with a bachelor's degree or higher was estimated to be 11.5% of the population.

=== Income and poverty ===
The 2016–2020 5-year American Community Survey estimates show that the median household income was $37,434 (with a margin of error of +/- $5,721) and the median family income was $46,905 (+/- $14,298). Males had a median income of $28,533 (+/- $6,664) versus $25,685 (+/- $4,127) for females. The median income for those above 16 years old was $27,188 (+/- $2,184). Approximately 9.7% of families and 16.3% of the population were below the poverty line, including 18.4% of those under the age of 18 and 5.7% of those ages 65 or over.

=== 2010 census ===
As of the census of 2010, there were 2,628 people, 1,252 households, and 647 families residing in the city. The population density was 1,375.9 inhabitants per square mile (531.2/km^{2}). There were 1,416 housing units at an average density of 741.4 per square mile (286.3/km^{2}). The racial makeup of the city was 95.9% White, 0.1% African American, 1.1% Native American, 0.4% Asian, 0.3% from other races, and 2.1% from two or more races. Hispanic or Latino of any race were 2.5% of the population.

There were 1,252 households, of which 23.2% had children under the age of 18 living with them, 36.7% were married couples living together, 11.1% had a female householder with no husband present, 3.9% had a male householder with no wife present, and 48.3% were non-families. 41.9% of all households were made up of individuals, and 19.1% had someone living alone who was 65 years of age or older. The average household size was 2.02 and the average family size was 2.71.

The median age in the city was 45.8 years. 19.1% of residents were under the age of 18; 8.4% were between the ages of 18 and 24; 21.4% were from 25 to 44; 28.6% were from 45 to 64; and 22.5% were 65 years of age or older. The gender makeup of the city was 48.6% male and 51.4% female.

== Economy and environment ==
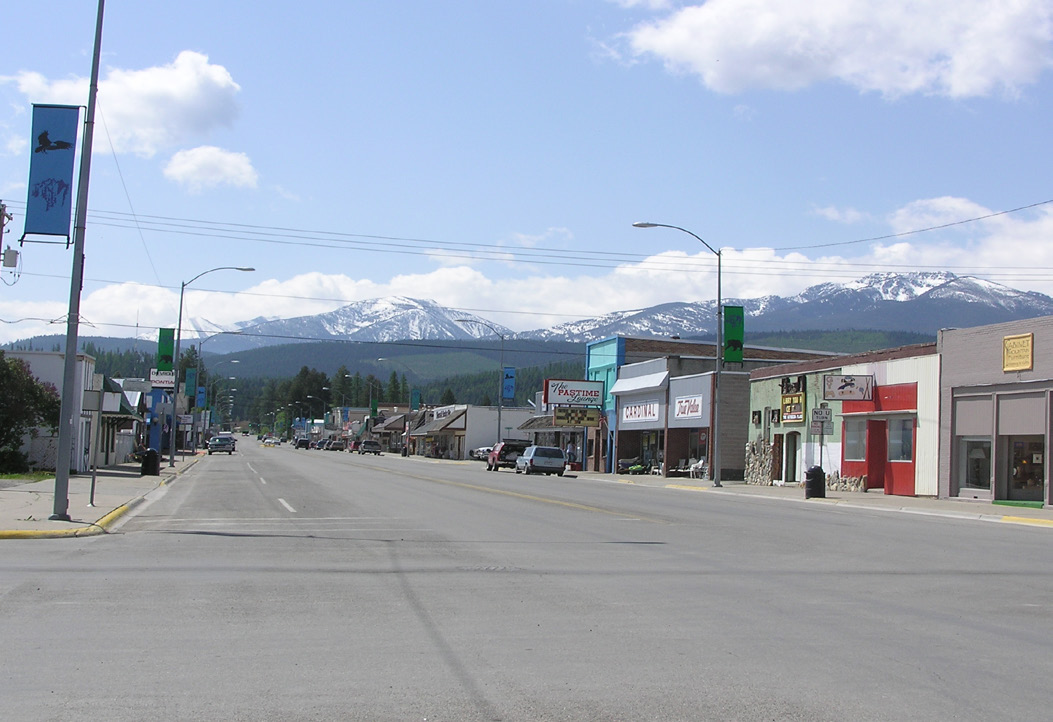
Downtown Libby

Libby's economy had been largely supported in the past by the use of natural resources, such as logging and mining. Mining and timber mills have since closed down. Tourism is playing an increasing role in the local economy. The Libby Dam is 17 miles (27 km) upstream from Libby, one of the Columbia River Treaty Dams, finished in 1975. Libby is known as the "City of Eagles". Several eagle sculptures can be found around town, including a 60-foot (18 m) eagle at both ends of town.

In 1961, area volunteers opened the Turner Ski Area about 20 miles north of Libby. Owned by a nonprofit foundation, the Ski Area served around 4,600 visits per year in 2017/2018 and relies on volunteer hours and donations for most of its services. In the mid-1980s, a major ski resort was proposed for Great Northern Mountain, twenty miles (30 km) south of Libby. Discussions on land usage and wildlife reached the United States Senate Committee on Energy and Natural Resources in the Subcommittee on Public Lands and Reserved Water, and ultimately the ski resort was not built.

Libby's energy usage includes or potentially includes multiple renewable resources: biomass, hydroelectric, and solar. In 2008, a report found that wood pellet waste from nearby lumber mills could be used to produce several megawatts of electricity. The Flathead Electric Co-op began purchasing up to 2.5 megawatts of power from the F.H. Stoltze Land & Lumber Company in 2013 with a twenty year contract, leading to the construction of "a biomass-fueled electric generation facility at their plant near Columbia Falls." The Co-op "receives Renewable Energy Credits." The city also generates and sells hydroelectric energy. In 2020, a statewide appraisal of Montana public schools' solar power potential, the Montana Community Solar Project, assessed Libby's schools and found the buildings had good potential, but installing solar panels would be financially inefficient as the schools' "electric demand charges [were] in the 92nd percentile when compared against the cohort of 25 schools."

=== Vermiculite mine and asbestos contamination ===
In 1919, vermiculite was discovered in the mountains near town. In 1963 W. R. Grace and Company bought the local mine, by which time it was producing 80% of the vermiculite in the world. Because the local vermiculite contains asbestos, and the mine's byproducts were used in local buildings and landscaping, the town suffered from an extremely high rate of asbestosis. Nearly 10% of the population died from asbestos contamination, and the federal government later charged company officials for complicity. On May 8, 2009, W.R. Grace & Co. was acquitted of charges that it knowingly harmed the people of Libby. It was also acquitted of subsequently participating in any cover-up. Fred Festa, chairman, president and CEO said in a statement, "the company worked hard to keep the operations in compliance with the laws and standards of the day." In 2004, Libby, Montana, a documentary on the situation, was released.

On June 17, 2009, the EPA declared its first public health emergency, which covered Libby and nearby Troy. It had provided an additional $130 million in cleanup and medical assistance. The 2010 Patient Protection and Affordable Care Act includes a provision which provided Medicare coverage to individuals of such public health emergencies.

By 2015, the U.S. Environmental Protection Agency (EPA) was concluding the removal of asbestos-contaminated soils and other suspect materials in and near Libby and had spent $425 million in Superfund money on cleanup. That year, an EPA review of toxicity and risks found that the cleanups had managed asbestos exposure risk effectively. By the end of 2018, the EPA had removed "more than one million cubic yards of contaminated soil," and area cleanup was completed that year, except for the location of the former mine, which is the disposal site of the contaminated soil. Contaminated construction materials were disposed of "in a specially designed landfill cell." The remaining contamination is limited to the forests and property in or near the former mine, with cleanup plans pending and with controls for higher exposures during wildfire fighting.

In 2020, the EPA transferred control of the site to the Montana Department of Environmental Quality. The same year, the local Center for Asbestos began offering testing for autoimmune markers for pleural disease, which would act as an early screen for at-risk patients.

=== Ground water contamination ===
A second EPA Superfund site is the Libby Ground Water Contamination site at a former lumber and plywood mill which ceased operations in 1969. The mill's disposal practices and spills contaminated the soil, surface water, and groundwater with chemicals including pentachlorophenol, which the EPA discovered in nearby well water in 1979. Site reviews are held every five years, and as of 2020, several controls are in place to prevent contact with and consumption of contaminated materials.

== Government ==
Libby has a mayor and six city council members. Hugh R. Taylor II was elected mayor in 2025. He defeated incumbent Peggy Williams. Williams had been appointed to the position to fill the remainder of Brent Teske's term. She then won the 2021 election.

== Media ==
Radio

- KHRU-LP FM 93.1 religious
- KLCB AM 1230 country music
- KTNY FM 101.7 adult hits
- KUFL FM 90.5 (local NPR station)

Newspaper

- Kootenai Valley Record - Weekly
- The Western News- biweekly (Lincoln county newspaper of public record)
- The Montanian - Weekly

== Education ==
Public education in Libby is administered by the Libby School District. The district operates Libby Elementary School and Libby Middle-High School.

Libby Adventist Christian School and Kootenai Valley Christian School are private institutions.

Libby has a public library, a branch of the Lincoln County Public Libraries. Established in 1920 after residents petitioned the Board of County Commissioners, the county free library first operated out of the former Libby Woman’s Club building. The Woman's Club had formerly sponsored a small library of two thousand books for Libby citizens, and members of the Woman’s Club voted to donate the collection to kickstart the new library's circulating collection. The library moved buildings for the next few decades until its current building, the Inez R. Herrig building, was built in 1964. Branches were established in other county towns, and from 1956 to 1974, a bookmobile served smaller areas. The library now provides programming for children and adults and online services such as mobile data hotspots for borrowing.

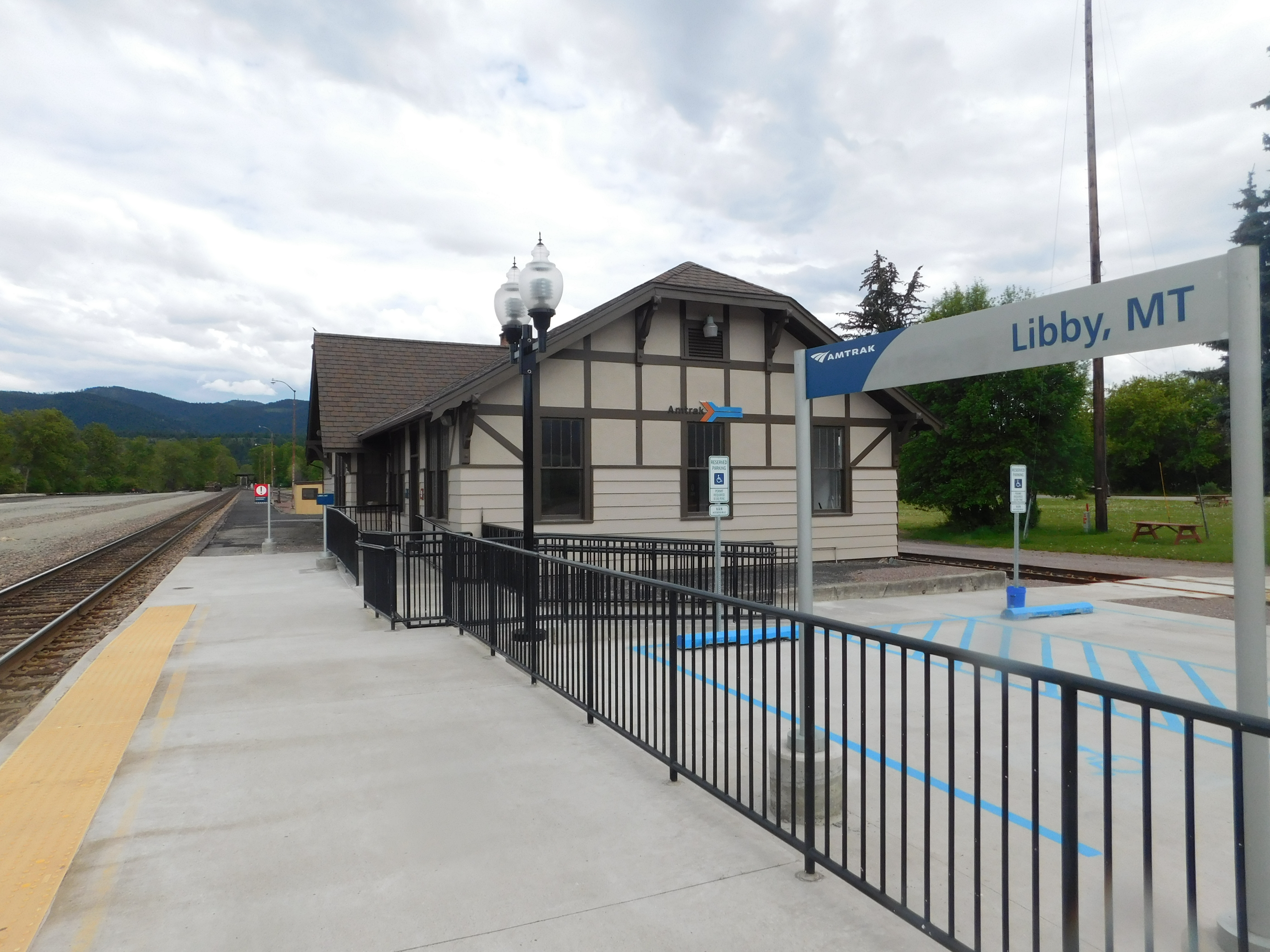
Libby Amtrak station

Flathead Valley Community College offers courses through its Lincoln County Campus in Libby. This campus operates the Glacier Bank Adult Basic Education Learning Center "where students can take free classes in preparation for their GED exams."

== Transportation ==
Libby is located on the BNSF Railway's Northern Transcon. Amtrak serves Libby through a local station.

U.S. Route 2 and Highway 37 meet at a traffic light in the center of town.

Libby Airport is a public use airport seven miles south of town.

== Notable people ==
- Steve Gunderson, politician in Montana, serving Montana House of Representatives for District 1
- Ralph Heinert, engineer and politician in Montana, serving Montana House of Representatives for District 1
- Ryggs Johnston, golfer
- John Lovick, magician
- Scott MacDonald, actor
- Destiney Sue Moore, television personality, best known for her appearance on the second season of Rock of Love
- Duane Nellis, president of Ohio University
- Marc Racicot, Governor of Montana (1993–2001), Chairman of Republican National Committee (2003–2004)
- Keith Tower, NBA player

== Popular culture ==
The nearby Kootenai Falls and the Swinging Bridge were featured in the 1994 movie The River Wild. The original bridge was constructed by the Civilian Conservation Corps during the Great Depression, and the falls are a sacred site to the Kutenai tribes who originally lived in the area.

The Kootenai Falls were featured in the 2015 movie The Revenant.
