= Steve Gallus =

American politician

Member of the Montana Senate from the 37th district
- In office 2004–2012
- Preceded by: Mike Taylor
- Succeeded by: Jon Sesso

Personal details
- Party: Democratic Party
- Education: University of Portland

Steven J. "Steve" Gallus is a Democratic Party member of the Montana Senate. He represented District 37 from 2004 to 2012. He was ineligible to run for re-election due to Montana's term limits.

Earlier he was a member of the Montana House of Representatives from 1998 through 2004.
