= Ron Erickson =

American politician

Member of the Montana Senate from the 47th district
- In office 2009 to 2013

Personal details
- Born: April 20, 1933 Peoria, Illinois
- Died: October 8, 2023 (aged 90)
- Party: Democratic Party
- Spouse: Nancy
- Education: Bradley University, University of Iowa
- Profession: University professor

Ron Erickson (April 20, 1933 – October 8, 2023) was a Democratic Party member of the Montana Senate. In 2009, he was elected for Senate District 47, representing Missoula, Montana. He was a member of the Montana House of Representatives, representing District 93 from 1998 to 2009.

Erickson died on October 8, 2023, at the age of 90.
