= Elections in Montana =

United States presidential election results for Montana
| Year | Republican | | Democratic | | Third party(ies) | |
| Year | No. | % | No. | % | No. | % |
|---|---|---|---|---|---|---|
| 1892 | 18,871 | 42.44% | 17,690 | 39.79% | 7,900 | 17.77% |
| 1896 | 10,509 | 19.71% | 42,628 | 79.93% | 193 | 0.36% |
| 1900 | 25,409 | 39.79% | 37,311 | 58.43% | 1,136 | 1.78% |
| 1904 | 34,932 | 54.21% | 21,773 | 33.79% | 7,739 | 12.01% |
| 1908 | 32,333 | 46.98% | 29,326 | 42.61% | 7,163 | 10.41% |
| 1912 | 18,512 | 23.19% | 27,941 | 35.00% | 33,373 | 41.81% |
| 1916 | 66,750 | 37.57% | 101,063 | 56.88% | 9,866 | 5.55% |
| 1920 | 109,430 | 61.13% | 57,372 | 32.05% | 12,204 | 6.82% |
| 1924 | 74,138 | 42.50% | 33,805 | 19.38% | 66,480 | 38.11% |
| 1928 | 113,300 | 58.37% | 78,578 | 40.48% | 2,230 | 1.15% |
| 1932 | 78,078 | 36.07% | 127,286 | 58.80% | 11,115 | 5.13% |
| 1936 | 63,598 | 27.59% | 159,690 | 69.28% | 7,224 | 3.13% |
| 1940 | 99,579 | 40.17% | 145,698 | 58.78% | 2,596 | 1.05% |
| 1944 | 93,163 | 44.93% | 112,556 | 54.28% | 1,636 | 0.79% |
| 1948 | 96,770 | 43.15% | 119,071 | 53.09% | 8,437 | 3.76% |
| 1952 | 157,394 | 59.39% | 106,213 | 40.07% | 1,430 | 0.54% |
| 1956 | 154,933 | 57.13% | 116,238 | 42.87% | 0 | 0.00% |
| 1960 | 141,841 | 51.10% | 134,891 | 48.60% | 847 | 0.31% |
| 1964 | 113,032 | 40.57% | 164,246 | 58.95% | 1,350 | 0.48% |
| 1968 | 138,835 | 50.60% | 114,117 | 41.59% | 21,452 | 7.82% |
| 1972 | 183,976 | 57.93% | 120,197 | 37.85% | 13,430 | 4.23% |
| 1976 | 173,703 | 52.84% | 149,259 | 45.40% | 5,772 | 1.76% |
| 1980 | 206,814 | 56.82% | 118,032 | 32.43% | 39,106 | 10.74% |
| 1984 | 232,450 | 60.47% | 146,742 | 38.18% | 5,185 | 1.35% |
| 1988 | 190,412 | 52.07% | 168,936 | 46.20% | 6,326 | 1.73% |
| 1992 | 144,207 | 35.12% | 154,507 | 37.63% | 111,897 | 27.25% |
| 1996 | 179,652 | 44.11% | 167,922 | 41.23% | 59,687 | 14.66% |
| 2000 | 240,178 | 58.44% | 137,126 | 33.36% | 33,693 | 8.20% |
| 2004 | 266,063 | 59.07% | 173,710 | 38.56% | 10,672 | 2.37% |
| 2008 | 243,882 | 49.49% | 232,159 | 47.11% | 16,709 | 3.39% |
| 2012 | 267,928 | 55.30% | 201,839 | 41.66% | 14,717 | 3.04% |
| 2016 | 279,240 | 55.65% | 177,709 | 35.41% | 44,873 | 8.94% |
| 2020 | 343,602 | 56.74% | 244,786 | 40.42% | 17,182 | 2.84% |
| 2024 | 352,079 | 58.27% | 231,906 | 38.38% | 20,196 | 3.34% |

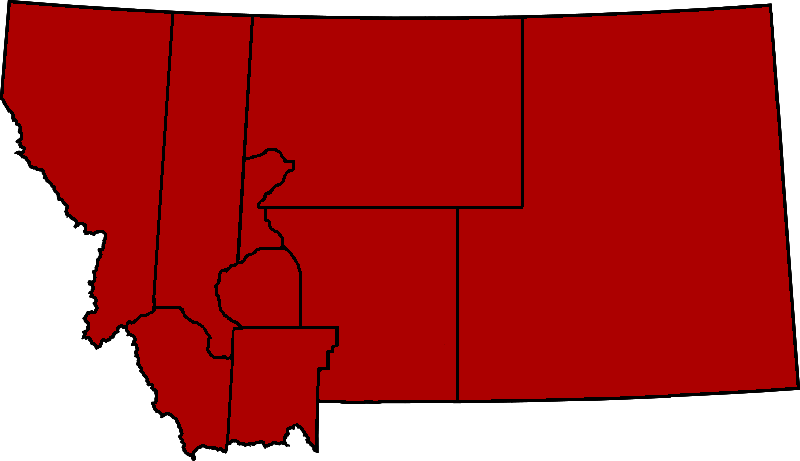
Original 9 Montana counties

Montana became a territory May 28, 1864 and the first delegation created nine counties: Beaverhead, Big Horn (renamed Custer in 1877), Chouteau, Deer Lodge, Gallatin, Jefferson, Edgerton (renamed Lewis and Clark in 1867), Madison, and Missoula. Montana became a state on November 8, 1889.

Montana has a history of voters splitting their tickets and filling elected offices with individuals from both parties. Through the mid-20th century, the state had a tradition of "sending the liberals to Washington and the conservatives to Helena". Between 1988 and 2006, the pattern flipped, with voters more likely to elect conservatives to federal offices. There have also been long-term shifts in party control. From 1968 through 1988, the state was dominated by the Democratic Party, with Democratic governors for a 20-year period, and a Democratic majority of both the national congressional delegation and during many sessions of the state legislature. This pattern shifted, beginning with the 1988 election when Montana elected a Republican governor for the first time since 1964 and sent a Republican to the U.S. Senate for the first time since 1948. This shift continued with the reapportionment of the state's legislative districts that took effect in 1994, when the Republican Party took control of both chambers of the state legislature, consolidating a Republican party dominance that lasted until the 2004 reapportionment produced more swing districts and a brief period of Democratic legislative majorities in the mid-2000s.

Montana has voted for the Republican nominee in all but two presidential elections since 1952. The state last supported a Democrat for president in 1992, when Bill Clinton won a plurality victory. However, since 1889 the state has voted for Democratic governors 60 percent of the time, and Republican governors 40 percent of the time. In the 2008 presidential election, Montana was considered a swing state and was ultimately won by Republican John McCain by a narrow margin of two percent.

In a 2020 study, Montana was ranked as the 21st easiest state for citizens to vote in.

== 1890s ==
Included representatives from additional territorial counties: Meagher (1866), Dawson (1869), Silver Bow (1881), Yellowstone (1883), Fergus (1885), Park (1887), and Cascade (1887)

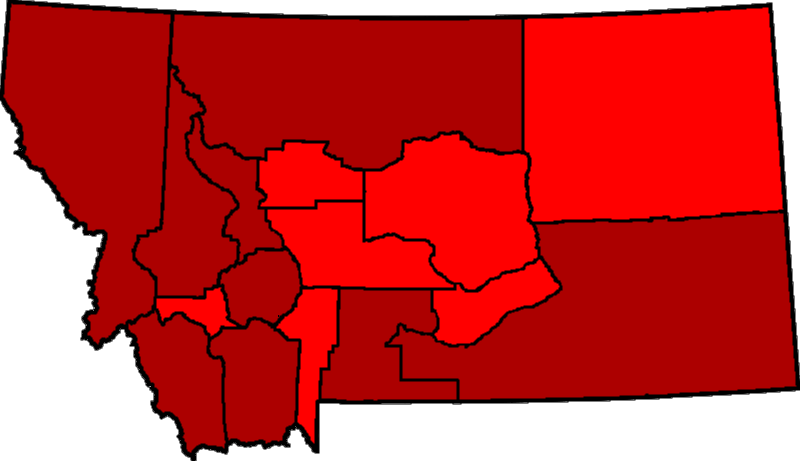
Montana county map 1890

=== 1892 elections ===
- United States presidential election in Montana, 1892

=== 1896 elections ===
First election to include Flathead, Valley, Teton, Ravalli, Granite, Carbon, and Sweet Grass counties.

- United States presidential election in Montana, 1896

== 1900s ==
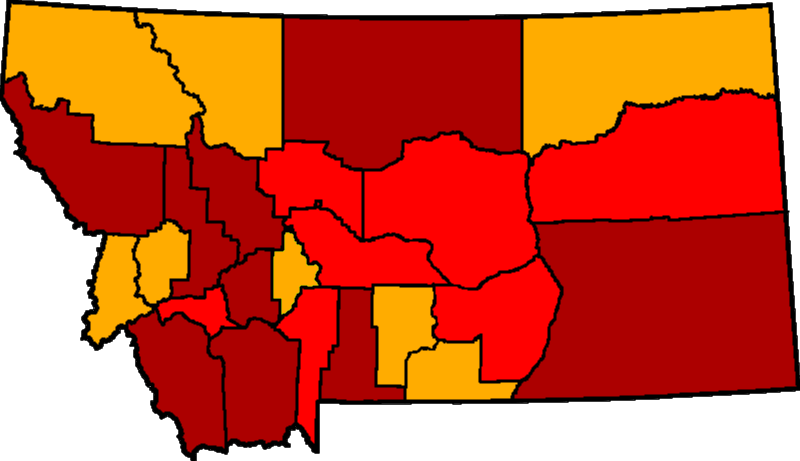
Montana county map 1900

=== 1900 elections ===
First election to include Broadwater County

- United States presidential election in Montana, 1900

=== 1904 elections ===
First election to include Powell and Rosebud counties.

- United States presidential election in Montana, 1904

=== 1908 elections ===
First election to include Sanders County

- United States presidential election in Montana, 1908

== 1910s ==
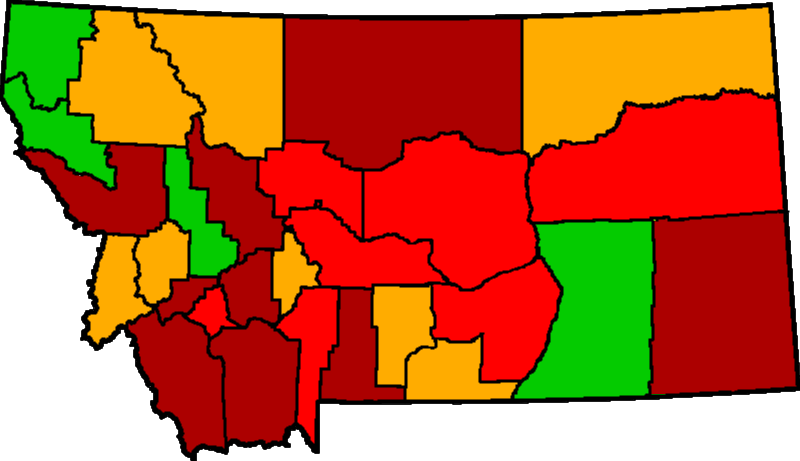
Montana county map 1910

=== 1912 elections ===
First election to include Lincoln, Musselshell, Hill and Blaine counties.

- United States presidential election in Montana, 1912

=== 1916 elections ===
First election to include Big Horn, Stillwater, Sheridan, Fallon, Toole, Richland, Mineral, Wibaux, Phillips, and Prairie counties.

- United States presidential election in Montana, 1916

=== 1918 elections ===
- United States Senate election in Montana, 1918

== 1920s ==
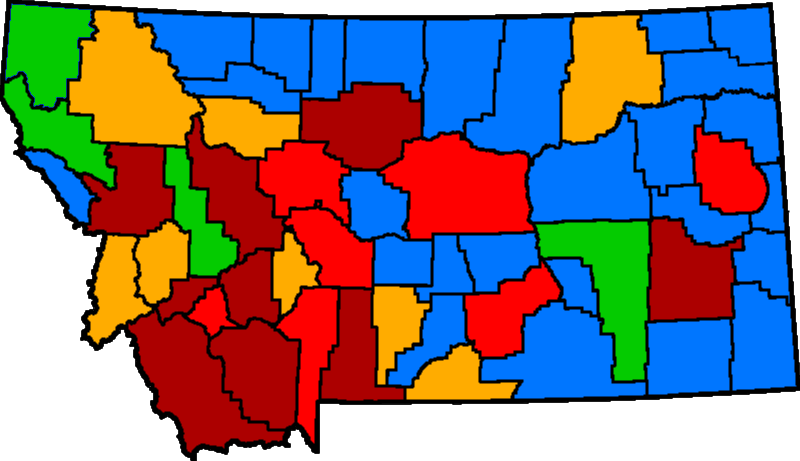
Montana county map 1920

=== 1920 elections ===
First election to include Liberty, Golden Valley, and Daniels counties.

- United States presidential election in Montana, 1920

=== 1922 elections ===
- United States Senate election in Montana, 1922

=== 1924 elections ===
First election to include Judith Basin and Lake counties.

- United States presidential election in Montana, 1924
- United States Senate election in Montana, 1924

=== 1928 elections ===
First election to include Petroleum County.

- United States presidential election in Montana, 1928
- United States Senate election in Montana, 1928

== 1930s ==
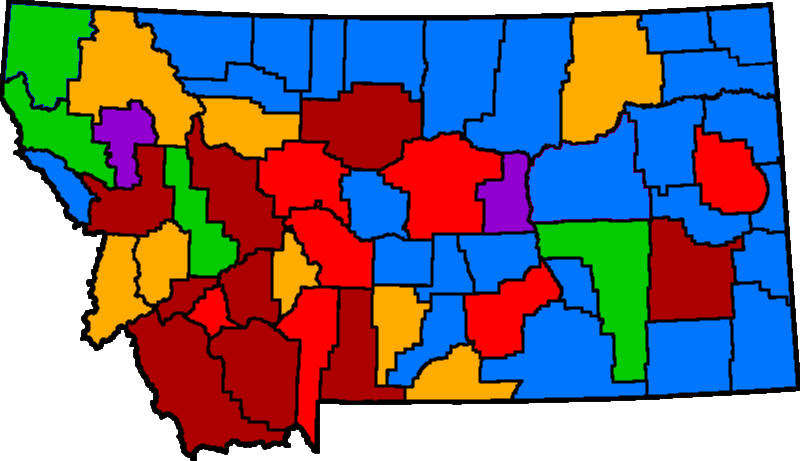
Montana county map 1930 (current)

- United States Senate election in Montana, 1930

=== 1932 elections ===
- United States presidential election in Montana, 1932

=== 1934 elections ===
- United States Senate election in Montana, 1934
- United States Senate special election in Montana, 1934

=== 1936 elections ===
- United States presidential election in Montana, 1936
- United States Senate election in Montana, 1936

== 1940s ==
=== 1940 elections ===
- United States presidential election in Montana, 1940
- United States Senate election in Montana, 1940

=== 1942 elections ===
- United States Senate election in Montana, 1942

=== 1944 elections ===
- United States presidential election in Montana, 1944

=== 1946 elections ===
- United States Senate election in Montana, 1946

=== 1948 elections ===
- United States presidential election in Montana, 1948
- United States Senate election in Montana, 1948

== 1950s ==
=== 1952 elections ===
- United States presidential election in Montana, 1952
- United States Senate election in Montana, 1952

=== 1954 elections ===
- United States Senate election in Montana, 1954

=== 1956 elections ===
- United States presidential election in Montana, 1956

=== 1958 elections ===
- United States Senate election in Montana, 1958

== 1960s ==
=== 1960 elections ===
- 1960 United States presidential election in Montana
- 1960 United States Senate election in Montana
- 1960 United States House of Representatives elections in Montana
- 1960 Montana gubernatorial election

=== 1962 ===
- 1962 United States House of Representatives elections in Montana

=== 1964 elections ===
- 1964 United States presidential election in Montana
- 1964 United States Senate election in Montana
- 1964 United States House of Representatives elections in Montana

=== 1966 elections ===
- 1966 United States Senate election in Montana
- 1966 United States House of Representatives elections in Montana

=== 1968 elections ===
- 1968 United States presidential election in Montana
- 1968 United States House of Representatives elections in Montana
- 1968 Montana gubernatorial election

=== 1969 elections ===
- 1969 Montana's 2nd congressional district special election

== 1970s ==
=== 1970 elections ===
- 1970 United States Senate election in Montana
- 1970 United States House of Representatives elections in Montana

=== 1972 elections ===
- 1972 United States presidential election in Montana
- 1972 United States Senate election in Montana
- 1972 United States House of Representatives elections in Montana
- 1972 Montana gubernatorial election

=== 1974 elections ===
- 1974 United States House of Representatives elections in Montana
- 1974 Montana Senate election
- 1974 Montana House of Representatives election

=== 1976 elections ===
- 1976 United States presidential election in Montana
- 1976 United States Senate election in Montana
- 1976 United States House of Representatives elections in Montana
- 1976 Montana gubernatorial election
- 1976 Montana Senate election
- 1976 Montana House of Representatives election

=== 1978 elections ===
- 1978 United States Senate election in Montana
- 1978 United States House of Representatives elections in Montana
- 1978 Montana Senate election
- 1978 Montana House of Representatives election

== 1980s ==
=== 1980 elections ===
- 1980 United States presidential election in Montana
- 1980 United States House of Representatives elections in Montana
- 1980 Montana gubernatorial election
- 1980 Montana Senate election
- 1980 Montana House of Representatives election

=== 1982 elections ===
- 1982 United States Senate election in Montana
- 1982 United States House of Representatives elections in Montana

=== 1984 elections ===
- 1984 United States presidential election in Montana
- 1984 United States Senate election in Montana
- 1984 Montana gubernatorial election
- 1984 United States House of Representatives elections in Montana

=== 1986 ===
- 1986 United States House of Representatives elections in Montana

=== 1988 elections ===
- 1988 United States presidential election in Montana
- 1988 United States Senate election in Montana
- 1988 Montana gubernatorial election

== 1990s ==
=== 1990 elections ===
- 1990 United States Senate election in Montana
- 1990 United States House of Representatives elections in Montana

=== 1992 elections ===
- 1992 United States presidential election in Montana
- 1992 Montana gubernatorial election

=== 1994 elections ===
- 1994 United States Senate election in Montana
- 1994 United States House of Representatives election in Montana

=== 1996 elections ===
- 1996 United States presidential election in Montana
- 1996 United States Senate election in Montana
- 1996 United States House of Representatives election in Montana
- 1996 Montana gubernatorial election

=== 1998 elections ===
- 1998 United States House of Representatives election in Montana

== 2000s ==
=== 2000 elections ===
- 2000 United States presidential election in Montana
- 2000 United States Senate election in Montana
- 2000 United States House of Representatives election in Montana
- 2000 Montana gubernatorial election
- 2000 Montana House of Representatives election

=== 2002 elections ===
- 2002 United States Senate election in Montana
- 2002 United States House of Representatives election in Montana
- 2002 Montana House of Representatives election

=== 2004 elections ===
- United States presidential election in Montana, 2004
- 2004 United States House of Representatives election in Montana
- Montana gubernatorial election, 2004
- 2004 Montana House of Representatives election

=== 2006 elections ===
- United States Senate election in Montana, 2006
- United States House of Representatives election in Montana, 2006
- 2006 Montana House of Representatives election

=== 2008 elections ===
- United States presidential election in Montana, 2008
- United States Senate election in Montana, 2008
- United States House of Representatives election in Montana, 2008
- Montana Democratic primary, 2008
- Montana Republican caucuses, 2008
- Montana gubernatorial election, 2008
- 2008 Montana House of Representatives election

== 2010s ==
=== 2010 elections ===
- 2010 Montana elections
- 2010 United States House of Representatives election in Montana
- 2010 Montana House of Representatives election

=== 2012 elections ===
- 2012 United States presidential election in Montana
- 2012 United States Senate election in Montana
- 2012 United States House of Representatives election in Montana
- Montana Republican caucuses, 2012
- 2012 Montana gubernatorial election
- 2012 Montana House of Representatives election

=== 2014 elections ===
- 2014 United States Senate election in Montana
- 2014 United States House of Representatives election in Montana
- 2014 Montana judicial elections
- 2014 Montana Senate election
- 2014 Montana House of Representatives election

=== 2016 elections ===
- 2016 Montana elections
- 2016 United States presidential election in Montana
- 2016 United States House of Representatives election in Montana
- 2016 Montana gubernatorial election
- 2016 Montana Senate election
- 2016 Montana House of Representatives election

=== 2017 elections ===
- 2017 Montana's at-large congressional district special election

=== 2018 elections ===
- 2018 Montana elections
- 2018 United States House of Representatives election in Montana
- 2018 United States Senate election in Montana
- 2018 Montana Senate election
- 2018 Montana House of Representatives election

== 2020s ==
=== 2020 elections ===
- 2020 Montana elections
- 2020 United States House of Representatives election in Montana
- 2020 United States Senate election in Montana
- 2020 Montana gubernatorial election
- 2020 United States presidential election in Montana
- 2020 Montana Senate election
- 2020 Montana House of Representatives election

=== 2022 elections ===
- 2022 Montana elections
- 2022 United States House of Representatives elections in Montana
- 2022 Montana Senate election
- 2022 Montana House of Representatives election

=== 2024 elections ===
- 2024 Montana elections
- 2024 United States House of Representatives elections in Montana
- 2024 United States Senate election in Montana
- 2024 Montana gubernatorial election
- 2024 United States presidential election in Montana
- 2024 Montana Senate election
- 2024 Montana House of Representatives election

=== 2026 elections ===
- 2026 Montana elections
- 2026 United States House of Representatives elections in Montana
- 2026 United States Senate election in Montana
- 2026 Montana Senate election
- 2026 Montana House of Representatives election

== See also ==
- Political party strength in Montana
- United States presidential elections in Montana
- Women's suffrage in Montana
