= List of United States representatives from Montana =

The following is an alphabetical list of United States representatives from the state of Montana. For chronological tables of members of both houses of the United States Congress from the state (through the present day), see Montana's congressional delegations. The list of names should be complete (as of May 25, 2017), but other data may be incomplete. It includes members who have represented both the state and the territory, both past and present.

== Current members ==
Updated January 3, 2025.

- 1st district: Ryan Zinke (R) (since 2023, 2015–2017)
- 2nd district: Troy Downing (R) (since 2025)

== List of members and delegates ==
Member/Delegate	Years	Party	District	Notes
LeRoy H. Anderson	January 3, 1957 – January 3, 1961	Democratic	2nd	Elected in 1956. Re-elected in 1958. Retired to run for U.S. senator.
Roy E. Ayers	March 4, 1933 – January 3, 1937	Democratic	2nd	Elected in 1932. Re-elected in 1934. Retired to run for Governor of Montana.
James F. Battin	January 3, 1961 – February 27, 1969	Republican	2nd	Elected in 1960. Re-elected in 1962. Re-elected in 1964. Re-elected in 1966. Re-elected in 1968. Resigned to become judge of the U.S. District Court of Montana.
Max Baucus	January 3, 1975 – December 14, 1978	Democratic	1st	Elected in 1974. Re-elected in 1976. Retired to run for U.S. senator and resigned when appointed to that seat.
Albert J. Campbell	March 4, 1899 – March 3, 1901	Democratic	At-large	Elected in 1898. Retired.
Thomas Henry Carter	March 4, 1889 – November 8, 1889	Republican	Territory	Elected in 1888. Position eliminated upon statehood.
Thomas Henry Carter	November 8, 1889 – March 3, 1891	Republican	At-large	Elected in 1889. Lost re-election to W.W. Dixon.
James M. Cavanaugh	March 4, 1867 – March 3, 1871	Democratic	Territory	Elected in 1866. Re-elected in 1868. Lost renomination to Edwin W. Toole.
William H. Clagett	March 4, 1871 – March 3, 1873	Republican	Territory	Elected in 1871. Lost re-election to Maginnis.
Wesley A. D'Ewart	June 5, 1945 – January 3, 1955	Republican	2nd	Elected to finish O'Connor's term. Re-elected in 1946. Re-elected in 1948. Re-elected in 1950. Re-elected in 1952. Retired to run for U.S. senator.
Steve Daines	January 3, 2013 – January 3, 2015	Republican	At-large	Elected in 2012. Retired to successfully run for U.S. Senate.
Joseph M. Dixon	March 4, 1903 – March 3, 1907	Republican	At-large	Elected in 1902. Re-elected in 1904. Retired to run for U.S. Senate.
William W. Dixon	March 4, 1891 – March 3, 1893	Democratic	At-large	Elected in 1890. Lost re-election to Hartman.
Troy Downing	January 3, 2025 – present	Republican	2nd	Elected in 2024. Incumbent.
Caldwell Edwards	March 4, 1901 – March 3, 1903	Populist	At-large	Elected in 1900. Retired.
John M. Evans	March 4, 1913 – March 3, 1919	Democratic	At-large	Elected in 1912. Re-elected in 1914. Re-elected in 1916. Redistricted to the 1st district.
John M. Evans	March 4, 1919 – March 3, 1921	Democratic	1st	Redistricted from the at-large district and re-elected in 1918. Lost re-election to McCormick.
John M. Evans	March 4, 1923 – March 3, 1933	Democratic	1st	Elected in 1922. Re-elected in 1924. Re-elected in 1926. Re-elected in 1928. Re-elected in 1930. Lost renomination to Monaghan.
Orvin B. Fjare	January 3, 1955 – January 3, 1957	Republican	2nd	Elected in 1954. Lost re-election to Anderson.
Greg Gianforte	May 25, 2017 – January 3, 2021	Republican	At-large	Elected to finish Zinke's term. Re-elected in 2018. Retired to successfully run for Governor of Montana.
Charles S. Hartman	March 4, 1893 – March 3, 1897	Republican	At-large	Elected in 1892. Re-elected in 1894.
Charles S. Hartman	March 4, 1897 – March 3, 1899	Silver Republican	At-large	Re-elected in 1896 as a Silver Republican. Retired.
Rick Hill	January 3, 1997 – January 3, 2001	Republican	At-large	Elected in 1996. Re-elected in 1998. Retired.
Scott Leavitt	March 4, 1923 – March 3, 1933	Republican	2nd	Elected in 1922. Re-elected in 1924. Re-elected in 1926. Re-elected in 1928. Re-elected in 1930. Lost re-election to Ayers.
Martin Maginnis	March 4, 1873 – March 3, 1885	Democratic	Territory	Elected in 1872. Re-elected in 1874. Re-elected in 1876. Re-elected in 1878. Re-elected in 1880. Re-elected in 1882. Retired.
Mike Mansfield	January 3, 1943 – January 3, 1953	Democratic	1st	Elected in 1942. Re-elected in 1944. Re-elected in 1946. Re-elected in 1948. Re-elected in 1950. Retired to run for U.S. senator.
Ron Marlenee	January 3, 1977 – January 3, 1993	Republican	2nd	Elected in 1976. Re-elected in 1978. Re-elected in 1980. Re-elected in 1982. Re-elected in 1984. Re-elected in 1986. Re-elected in 1988. Re-elected in 1990. Redistricted to the at-large district and lost re-election to Williams.
Washington J. McCormick	March 4, 1921 – March 3, 1923	Republican	1st	Elected in 1920. Lost re-election to Evans.
Samuel McLean	January 6, 1865 – March 3, 1867	Democratic	Territory	Elected in 1864. Re-elected in 1865. Retired.
John Melcher	June 24, 1969 – January 3, 1977	Democratic	2nd	Elected to finish Battin's term. Re-elected in 1970. Re-elected in 1972. Re-elected in 1974. Retired to run for U.S. senator.
Lee Metcalf	January 3, 1953 – January 3, 1961	Democratic	1st	Elected in 1952. Re-elected in 1954. Re-elected in 1956. Re-elected in 1958. Retired to run for U.S. senator.
Joseph P. Monaghan	March 4, 1933 – January 3, 1937	Democratic	1st	Elected in 1932. Re-elected in 1934. Retired to run for U.S. senator.
Jerry J. O'Connell	January 3, 1937 – January 3, 1939	Democratic	1st	Elected in 1936. Lost re-election to Thorkelson.
James F. O'Connor	January 3, 1937 – January 15, 1945	Democratic	2nd	Elected in 1936. Re-elected in 1938. Re-elected in 1940. Re-elected in 1942. Re-elected in 1944. Died.
Arnold Olsen	January 3, 1961 – January 3, 1971	Democratic	1st	Elected in 1960. Re-elected in 1962. Re-elected in 1964. Re-elected in 1966. Re-elected in 1968. Lost re-election to Shoup.
Charles Nelson Pray	March 4, 1907 – March 3, 1913	Republican	At-large	Elected in 1906. Re-elected in 1908. Re-elected in 1910. Lost re-election to Evans.
Jeannette Rankin	March 4, 1917 – March 3, 1919	Republican	At-large	Elected in 1916. Retired to run for U.S. Senator.
Jeannette Rankin	January 3, 1941 – January 3, 1943	Republican	1st	Elected in 1940. Retired.
Denny Rehberg	January 3, 2001 – January 3, 2013	Republican	At-large	Elected in 2000. Re-elected in 2002. Re-elected in 2004. Re-elected in 2006. Re-elected in 2008. Re-elected in 2010. Retired to run for U.S. Senator.
Carl W. Riddick	March 4, 1919 – March 3, 1923	Republican	2nd	Elected in 1918. Re-elected in 1920. Retired to run for U.S. senator.
Matt Rosendale	January 3, 2021 – January 3, 2023	Republican	At-large	Elected in 2020. Redistricted to the 2nd district.
Matt Rosendale	January 3, 2023 – January 3, 2025	Republican	2nd	Redistricted from the at-large district and re-elected in 2022. Retired.
Richard G. Shoup	January 3, 1971 – January 3, 1975	Republican	1st	Elected in 1970. Re-elected in 1972. Lost re-election to Baucus.
Tom Stout	March 4, 1913 – March 3, 1917	Democratic	At-large	Elected in 1912. Re-elected in 1914. Retired.
Jacob Thorkelson	January 3, 1939 – January 3, 1941	Republican	1st	Elected in 1938. Lost renomination to Rankin.
Joseph Toole	March 4, 1885 – March 3, 1889	Democratic	Territory	Elected in 1884. Re-elected in 1886. Retired.
Pat Williams	January 3, 1979 – January 3, 1993	Democratic	1st	Elected in 1978. Re-elected in 1980. Re-elected in 1982. Re-elected in 1984. Re-elected in 1986. Re-elected in 1988. Re-elected in 1990. Redistricted to the at-large seat.
Pat Williams	January 3, 1993 – January 3, 1997	Democratic	At-large	Redistricted from the 1st district. and Re-elected in 1992. Re-elected in 1994. Retired.
Ryan Zinke	January 3, 2015 – March 1, 2017	Republican	At-large	Elected in 2014. Re-elected in 2016. Resigned to become U.S. Secretary of the Interior.
Ryan Zinke	January 3, 2023 – present	Republican	1st	Elected in 2022. Incumbent.

== See also ==
- List of United States senators from Montana
- Montana's congressional delegations
- Montana's congressional districts
