= List of Montana state legislatures =

The legislature of the U.S. state of Montana has convened many times since statehood became effective on November 8, 1889.

== Legislatures ==
Name	Start date	End date	Last election
1889 Constitution of Montana (Note: The 1889 Constitution of Montana, Article V, specified that sessions began in January. Legislators' terms of office began the day after election.)
1st Montana legislature	November 23, 1889	February 20, 1890	1889
2nd Montana legislature	1891		
3rd Montana legislature	1893		
4th Montana legislature	1895		
5th Montana legislature	1897		
6th Montana legislature	1899		
7th Montana legislature	1901		
8th Montana legislature	1903		
9th Montana legislature	1905		November 1904
10th Montana legislature	1907		
11th Montana legislature	1909		
12th Montana legislature	1911		
13th Montana legislature	1913		
14th Montana legislature	1915		
15th Montana legislature	1917		
16th Montana legislature	1919		
17th Montana legislature	1921		
18th Montana legislature	1923		
19th Montana legislature	1925		
20th Montana legislature	1927		
21st Montana legislature	1929		
22nd Montana legislature	1931		
23rd Montana legislature	1933		
24th Montana legislature	1935		
25th Montana legislature	1937		
26th Montana legislature	1939		
27th Montana legislature	1941		
28th Montana legislature	1943		
29th Montana legislature	1945		
30th Montana legislature	1947		
31st Montana legislature	1949		
32nd Montana legislature	1951		
33rd Montana legislature	1953		
34th Montana legislature	1955		
35th Montana legislature	1957		
36th Montana legislature	1959		
37th Montana legislature	1961		
38th Montana legislature	1963		
39th Montana legislature	1965		
40th Montana legislature	1967		
41st Montana legislature	1969		
42nd Montana legislature	1971		
1972 Constitution of Montana
43rd Montana legislature	1973		
44th Montana legislature	1975		
45th Montana legislature	1977		
46th Montana legislature	1979		
47th Montana legislature	1981		
48th Montana legislature	1983		
49th Montana legislature	1985		
50th Montana legislature	1987		
51st Montana legislature	1989		November 1988
52nd Montana legislature	1991		
53rd Montana legislature	1993		
54th Montana legislature	1995		
55th Montana legislature	1997		
56th Montana legislature	1999		
57th Montana legislature	2001		November 7, 2000: House
58th Montana legislature	2003		November 2002: House
59th Montana legislature	2005		November 2004: House
60th Montana legislature	2007		November 2006: House
61st Montana legislature	2009		November 2008: House
62nd Montana legislature	2011		November 2, 2010: House
63rd Montana legislature	2013		November 6, 2012: House
64th Montana legislature	2015		November 4, 2014: House
65th Montana legislature	2017		November 8, 2016: House, Senate
66th Montana legislature	2019		November 6, 2018: House, Senate
67th Montana legislature	2021		November 3, 2020: House, Senate
68th Montana legislature	2023		November 8, 2022: House, Senate
69th Montana legislature	January 6, 2025	May 3, 2025	November 5, 2024: House, Senate

== See also ==
- List of speakers of the Montana House of Representatives
- List of governors of Montana
- Politics of Montana
- Elections in Montana
- Montana State Capitol
- Timeline of Montana history
- Lists of United States state legislative sessions
