= 1984 United States presidential election in Montana =

- November 6, 1984
- Turnout: 75.0% (▲0.1 pp)

Nominee	Ronald Reagan	Walter Mondale
Party	Republican	Democratic
Home state	California	Minnesota
Running mate	George H. W. Bush	Geraldine Ferraro
Electoral vote	4	0
Popular vote	232,450	146,742
Percentage	60.47%	38.18%

Reagan
50–60%
60–70%
70–80%
80–90%
Mondale
50–60%
60–70%
President before election
Ronald Reagan
Republican
Elected President
Ronald Reagan
Republican

The 1984 United States presidential election in Montana took place on November 6, 1984, and was part of the 1984 United States presidential election. Voters chose four representatives, or electors to the Electoral College, who voted for president and vice president.

Montana overwhelmingly voted for the Republican nominee, President Ronald Reagan, over the Democratic nominee, former Vice President Walter Mondale. Reagan won Montana by a landslide margin of 22.29%. As of the 2024 presidential election, this is the last election in which Glacier County voted for a Republican presidential candidate and the last time until 2016 that Roosevelt County voted Republican. Reagan became the first ever Republican to win the White House without carrying Big Horn County.

Despite this, Democratic Governor Ted Schwinden won re-election with 70% of the vote on the same ballot.

== Results ==
1984 United States presidential election in Montana
Party	Candidate	Votes	Percentage	Electoral votes
Republican	Ronald Reagan (incumbent)	232,450	60.47%	4
Democratic	Walter Mondale	146,742	38.18%	0
Libertarian	David Bergland	5,185	1.35%	0
Totals		384,377	100.00%	4

=== Results by county ===
County	Ronald Reagan Republican		Walter Mondale Democratic		David Bergland Libertarian		Margin		Total votes cast
County	#	%	#	%	#	%	#	%	Total votes cast
Beaverhead	3,044	75.44%	942	23.35%	49	1.21%	2,102	52.09%	4,035
Big Horn	2,390	46.77%	2,681	52.47%	39	0.76%	-291	-5.70%	5,110
Blaine	1,736	57.92%	1,229	41.01%	32	1.07%	507	16.91%	2,997
Broadwater	1,345	73.50%	458	25.03%	27	1.48%	887	48.47%	1,830
Carbon	2,877	62.72%	1,657	36.12%	53	1.16%	1,220	26.60%	4,587
Carter	823	80.06%	194	18.87%	11	1.07%	629	61.19%	1,028
Cascade	19,846	57.52%	14,252	41.30%	407	1.18%	5,594	16.22%	34,505
Chouteau	2,425	72.17%	896	26.67%	39	1.16%	1,529	45.50%	3,360
Custer	3,879	65.53%	1,982	33.49%	58	0.98%	1,897	32.04%	5,919
Daniels	984	66.62%	473	32.02%	20	1.35%	511	34.60%	1,477
Dawson	3,468	65.26%	1,776	33.42%	70	1.32%	1,692	31.84%	5,314
Deer Lodge	1,901	34.53%	3,539	64.29%	65	1.18%	-1,638	-29.76%	5,505
Fallon	1,237	67.63%	569	31.11%	23	1.26%	668	36.52%	1,829
Fergus	4,585	70.99%	1,804	27.93%	70	1.08%	2,781	43.06%	6,459
Flathead	17,012	65.93%	8,310	32.21%	481	1.86%	8,702	33.72%	25,803
Gallatin	15,643	64.80%	8,163	33.82%	334	1.38%	7,480	30.98%	24,140
Garfield	770	84.52%	134	14.71%	7	0.77%	636	69.81%	911
Glacier	2,228	50.24%	2,167	48.86%	40	0.90%	61	1.38%	4,435
Golden Valley	384	64.00%	211	35.17%	5	0.83%	173	28.83%	600
Granite	880	66.57%	417	31.54%	25	1.89%	463	35.03%	1,322
Hill	4,635	55.24%	3,657	43.59%	98	1.17%	978	11.65%	8,390
Jefferson	2,226	61.53%	1,324	36.59%	68	1.88%	902	24.94%	3,618
Judith Basin	1,050	67.74%	483	31.16%	17	1.10%	567	36.58%	1,550
Lake	5,754	61.55%	3,473	37.15%	121	1.29%	2,281	24.40%	9,348
Lewis and Clark	13,569	59.97%	8,768	38.75%	289	1.28%	4,801	21.22%	22,626
Liberty	895	72.82%	323	26.28%	11	0.90%	572	46.54%	1,229
Lincoln	4,080	56.79%	2,959	41.19%	145	2.02%	1,121	15.60%	7,184
McCone	1,015	67.80%	459	30.66%	23	1.54%	556	37.14%	1,497
Madison	2,308	75.20%	708	23.07%	53	1.73%	1,600	52.13%	3,069
Meagher	771	72.12%	283	26.47%	15	1.40%	488	45.65%	1,069
Mineral	943	55.34%	718	42.14%	43	2.52%	225	13.20%	1,704
Missoula	19,777	53.54%	16,540	44.78%	620	1.68%	3,237	8.76%	36,937
Musselshell	1,541	65.32%	781	33.11%	37	1.57%	760	32.21%	2,359
Park	4,115	62.53%	2,387	36.27%	79	1.20%	1,728	26.26%	6,581
Petroleum	258	74.35%	86	24.78%	3	0.86%	172	49.57%	347
Phillips	1,934	70.35%	787	28.63%	28	1.02%	1,147	41.72%	2,749
Pondera	2,239	67.52%	1,039	31.33%	38	1.15%	1,200	36.19%	3,316
Powder River	1,066	74.60%	346	24.21%	17	1.19%	720	50.39%	1,429
Powell	1,877	62.32%	1,066	35.39%	69	2.29%	811	26.93%	3,012
Prairie	693	69.93%	289	29.16%	9	0.91%	404	40.77%	991
Ravalli	8,161	67.15%	3,825	31.47%	168	1.38%	4,336	35.68%	12,154
Richland	3,847	72.85%	1,382	26.17%	52	0.98%	2,465	46.68%	5,281
Roosevelt	2,431	54.46%	1,962	43.95%	71	1.59%	469	10.51%	4,464
Rosebud	2,413	54.82%	1,920	43.62%	69	1.57%	493	11.20%	4,402
Sanders	2,467	58.68%	1,654	39.34%	83	1.97%	813	19.34%	4,204
Sheridan	1,774	61.62%	1,087	37.76%	18	0.63%	687	23.86%	2,879
Silver Bow	6,637	36.85%	11,095	61.60%	278	1.54%	-4,458	-24.75%	18,010
Stillwater	2,118	65.01%	1,100	33.76%	40	1.23%	1,018	31.25%	3,258
Sweet Grass	1,417	78.59%	378	20.97%	8	0.44%	1,039	57.62%	1,803
Teton	2,257	66.70%	1,102	32.57%	25	0.74%	1,155	34.13%	3,384
Toole	1,949	70.41%	789	28.50%	30	1.08%	1,160	41.91%	2,768
Treasure	353	61.28%	209	36.28%	14	2.43%	144	25.00%	576
Valley	3,123	61.89%	1,849	36.64%	74	1.47%	1,274	25.25%	5,046
Wheatland	753	64.19%	407	34.70%	13	1.11%	346	29.49%	1,173
Wibaux	423	64.98%	216	33.18%	12	1.84%	207	31.80%	651
Yellowstone	34,124	63.01%	19,437	35.89%	592	1.09%	14,687	27.12%	54,153
Totals	232,450	60.47%	146,742	38.18%	5,185	1.35%	85,708	22.29%	384,377

==== Counties that flipped from Republican to Democratic ====
- Big Horn

==== By congressional district ====
Reagan won both congressional districts, including one that elected a Democrat.

District	Reagan	Mondale	Representative
1st	58%	40%	Pat Williams
2nd	63%	36%	Ron Marlenee

== See also ==
- United States presidential elections in Montana
- Presidency of Ronald Reagan
