= 2002 Montana House of Representatives election =

- November 5, 2002

All 100 seats of the Montana House of Representatives 51 seats needed for a majority
- Registered: 624,548 ▼10.56%
- Turnout: 54.48% ▼5.37%

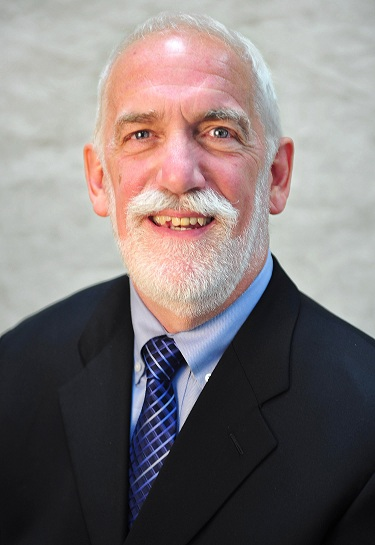
	Majority party	Minority party
Leader	Doug Mood	David Wanzenried
Party	Republican	Democratic
Leader's seat	58th district	68th district
Last election	58	42
Seats won	53	47
Seat change	▼5	▲5
Popular vote	159,141	148,845
Percentage	50.38%	47.12%
Swing	▼2.39%	▲3.31%
- Results: Democratic hold Democratic gain Republican hold Republican gain
Speaker before election
Dan McGee
Republican
Elected Speaker
Doug Mood
Republican

An election was held on November 5, 2002, to elect all 100 members to Montana's House of Representatives. The election coincided with elections for other offices, including U.S. Senate, U.S. House of Representatives and State Senate. The primary election was held on June 4, 2002.

Republicans retained control of the House despite a net loss of five seats, winning 53 seats compared to 48 seats for the Democrats.

== Predictions ==
Source	Ranking	As of
The Cook; Political Report	Likely R	October 4, 2002

== Results ==
=== Statewide ===
Statewide results of the 2002 Montana House of Representatives election:

Party	Candi- dates	Votes			Seats		
Party	Candi- dates	No.	%	+/–	No.	+/–	%
Republican Party	85	159,141	50.38%	▼2.39%	53	▼5	53.00%
Democratic Party	88	148,845	47.12%	▲3.31%	47	▲5	47.00%
Independent	2	3,097	0.98%	▲0.35%	0	Steady	0.00%
Constitution Party	10	2,876	0.91%	▼1.01%	0	Steady	0.00%
Green Party	4	1,277	0.40%	New	0	Steady	0.00%
Libertarian Party	2	544	0.17%	▼0.15%	0	Steady	0.00%
Write-in	4	78	0.02%	▲0.02%	0	Steady	0.00%
Total	195	315,858	100.00%	Steady	100	Steady	100.00%

=== District ===
Results of the 2002 Montana House of Representatives election by district:

District	Democratic		Republican		Others		Total votes	Result
District	Votes	%	Votes	%	Votes	%	Total votes	Result
1st district	871	27.92%	2,249	72.08%	—	—	3,120	Republican Hold
2nd district	2,572	100.00%	—	—	—	—	2,572	Democratic Hold
3rd district	—	—	2,514	100.00%	—	—	2,514	Republican Hold
4th district	2,320	100.00%	—	—	—	—	2,320	Democratic Hold
5th district	1,237	57.30%	922	42.70%	—	—	2,159	Democratic Hold
6th district	1,595	60.46%	1,043	39.54%	—	—	2,638	Democratic Hold
7th district	1,672	55.31%	1,351	44.69%	—	—	3,023	Democratic Hold
8th district	—	—	2,844	100.00%	—	—	2,844	Republican Hold
9th district	1,536	30.88%	3,438	69.12%	—	—	4,974	Republican Hold
10th district	1,689	38.43%	2,706	61.57%	—	—	4,395	Republican Hold
11th district	1,727	60.79%	1,114	39.21%	—	—	2,841	Democratic Hold
12th district	1,302	45.18%	1,580	54.82%	—	—	2,882	Republican Hold
13th district	937	49.66%	854	45.26%	96	5.09%	1,887	Democratic Hold
14th district	947	35.26%	1,555	57.89%	184	6.85%	2,686	Republican Hold
15th district	1,787	44.52%	2,227	55.48%	—	—	4,014	Republican Hold
16th district	1,589	55.97%	1,250	44.03%	—	—	2,839	Democratic Hold
17th district	1,361	64.75%	741	35.25%	—	—	2,102	Democratic Hold
18th district	1,506	52.95%	1,338	47.05%	—	—	2,844	Democratic GAIN
19th district	1,537	41.97%	2,125	58.03%	—	—	3,662	Republican GAIN
20th district	1,654	52.79%	1,479	47.21%	—	—	3,133	Democratic GAIN
21st district	1,187	39.70%	1,803	60.30%	—	—	2,990	Republican Hold
22nd district	1,628	46.24%	1,893	53.76%	—	—	3,521	Republican Hold
23rd district	2,077	48.27%	2,226	51.73%	—	—	4,303	Republican Hold
24th district	1,838	48.15%	1,979	51.85%	—	—	3,817	Republican Hold
25th district	1,320	34.48%	2,508	65.52%	—	—	3,828	Republican Hold
26th district	1,468	45.89%	1,731	54.11%	—	—	3,199	Republican GAIN
27th district	2,670	45.99%	3,135	54.01%	—	—	5,805	Republican Hold
28th district	2,278	48.83%	2,387	51.17%	—	—	4,665	Republican Hold
29th district	1,840	68.89%	831	31.11%	—	—	2,671	Democratic Hold
30th district	1,367	78.70%	—	—	370	21.30%	1,737	Democratic Hold
31st district	1,648	38.00%	2,689	62.00%	—	—	4,337	Republican Hold
32nd district	—	—	3,343	80.17%	827	19.83%	4,170	Republican Hold
33rd district	1,270	31.44%	2,770	68.56%	—	—	4,040	Republican Hold
34th district	758	24.15%	2,381	75.85%	—	—	3,139	Republican Hold
35th district	2,513	60.18%	1,663	39.82%	—	—	4,176	Democratic Hold
36th district	2,439	100.00%	—	—	—	—	2,439	Democratic Hold
37th district	2,158	100.00%	—	—	—	—	2,158	Democratic Hold
38th district	1,927	78.69%	522	21.31%	—	—	2,449	Democratic Hold
39th district	2,051	46.48%	2,362	53.52%	—	—	4,413	Republican Hold
40th district	—	—	3,295	100.00%	—	—	3,295	Republican Hold
41st district	518	45.64%	495	43.61%	122	10.75%	1,135	Democratic GAIN
42nd district	1,654	59.95%	921	33.38%	184	6.67%	2,759	Democratic Hold
43rd district	1,723	55.96%	1,152	37.41%	204	6.63%	3,079	Democratic Hold
44th district	1,785	100.00%	—	—	—	—	1,785	Democratic Hold
45th district	1,295	53.01%	1,080	44.21%	68	2.78%	2,443	Democratic Hold
46th district	1,164	68.75%	529	31.25%	—	—	1,693	Democratic Hold
47th district	2,217	67.99%	1,044	32.01%	—	—	3,261	Democratic Hold
48th district	2,151	98.13%	—	—	41	1.87%	2,192	Democratic Hold
49th district	1,564	41.23%	2,229	58.77%	—	—	3,793	Republican Hold
50th district	1,431	38.54%	2,016	54.30%	266	7.16%	3,713	Republican Hold
51st district	2,010	57.17%	1,506	42.83%	—	—	3,516	Democratic GAIN
52nd district	2,810	67.63%	1,345	32.37%	—	—	4,155	Democratic Hold
53rd district	2,097	64.09%	1,175	35.91%	—	—	3,272	Democratic Hold
54th district	2,871	74.07%	1,005	25.93%	—	—	3,876	Democratic Hold
55th district	1,610	40.14%	2,401	59.86%	—	—	4,011	Republican Hold
56th district	962	36.10%	1,703	63.90%	—	—	2,665	Republican Hold
57th district	2,912	100.00%	—	—	—	—	2,912	Democratic Hold
58th district	1,638	41.25%	2,333	58.75%	—	—	3,971	Republican Hold
59th district	1,342	36.61%	2,324	63.39%	—	—	3,666	Republican Hold
60th district	1,471	35.60%	2,487	60.19%	174	4.21%	4,132	Republican Hold
61st district	—	—	4,155	100.00%	—	—	4,155	Republican Hold
62nd district	1,693	46.11%	1,842	50.16%	137	3.73%	3,672	Republican Hold
63rd district	2,157	48.94%	2,250	51.06%	—	—	4,407	Republican Hold
64th district	2,268	60.72%	1,467	39.28%	—	—	3,735	Democratic Hold
65th district	2,351	100.00%	—	—	—	—	2,351	Democratic Hold
66th district	2,072	84.88%	—	—	369	15.12%	2,441	Democratic Hold
67th district	2,376	100.00%	—	—	—	—	2,376	Democratic Hold
68th district	1,600	64.44%	883	35.56%	—	—	2,483	Democratic Hold
69th district	2,246	55.12%	—	—	1,829	44.88%	4,075	Democratic Hold
70th district	1,946	53.79%	1,672	46.21%	—	—	3,618	Democratic Hold
71st district	1,241	36.12%	2,195	63.88%	—	—	3,436	Republican Hold
72nd district	2,866	100.00%	—	—	—	—	2,866	Democratic Hold
73rd district	1,539	49.28%	245	7.85%	1,339	42.88%	3,123	Democratic Hold
74th district	1,596	40.43%	2,352	59.57%	—	—	3,948	Republican Hold
75th district	1,574	38.29%	2,537	61.71%	—	—	4,111	Republican Hold
76th district	—	—	3,196	99.59%	13	0.41%	3,209	Republican Hold
77th district	1,507	38.59%	2,261	57.90%	137	3.51%	3,905	Republican Hold
78th district	1,441	50.83%	1,394	49.17%	—	—	2,835	Democratic GAIN
79th district	—	—	3,159	100.00%	—	—	3,159	Republican Hold
80th district	1,497	44.25%	1,664	49.19%	222	6.56%	3,383	Republican Hold
81st district	—	—	2,075	62.07%	1,268	37.93%	3,343	Republican Hold
82nd district	1,470	54.69%	1,218	45.31%	—	—	2,688	Democratic Hold
83rd district	1,100	37.12%	1,841	62.13%	22	0.74%	2,963	Republican Hold
84th district	936	30.01%	2,183	69.99%	—	—	3,119	Republican Hold
85th district	1,592	100.00%	—	—	—	—	1,592	Democratic Hold
86th district	1,624	55.29%	1,313	44.71%	—	—	2,937	Democratic GAIN
87th district	1,440	42.44%	1,953	57.56%	—	—	3,393	Republican Hold
88th district	—	—	2,601	100.00%	—	—	2,601	Republican Hold
89th district	1,547	42.27%	2,113	57.73%	—	—	3,660	Republican Hold
90th district	1,486	50.93%	1,432	49.07%	—	—	2,918	Democratic GAIN
91st district	1,507	68.97%	678	31.03%	—	—	2,185	Democratic Hold
92nd district	1,627	61.89%	1,002	38.11%	—	—	2,629	Democratic Hold
93rd district	1,507	39.47%	2,311	60.53%	—	—	3,818	Republican Hold
94th district	1,365	43.65%	1,762	56.35%	—	—	3,127	Republican Hold
95th district	1,096	34.39%	2,091	65.61%	—	—	3,187	Republican Hold
96th district	1,339	41.82%	1,863	58.18%	—	—	3,202	Republican Hold
97th district	—	—	2,150	100.00%	—	—	2,150	Republican Hold
98th district	1,738	100.00%	—	—	—	—	1,738	Democratic Hold
99th district	—	—	2,528	100.00%	—	—	2,528	Republican Hold
100th district	—	—	2,162	100.00%	—	—	2,162	Republican Hold
Total	148,845	47.12%	159,141	50.38%	7,872	2.49%	315,858	
