= Wyola, Montana =

Wyola, Montana Alachúa Uhpáko
- Census-designated place
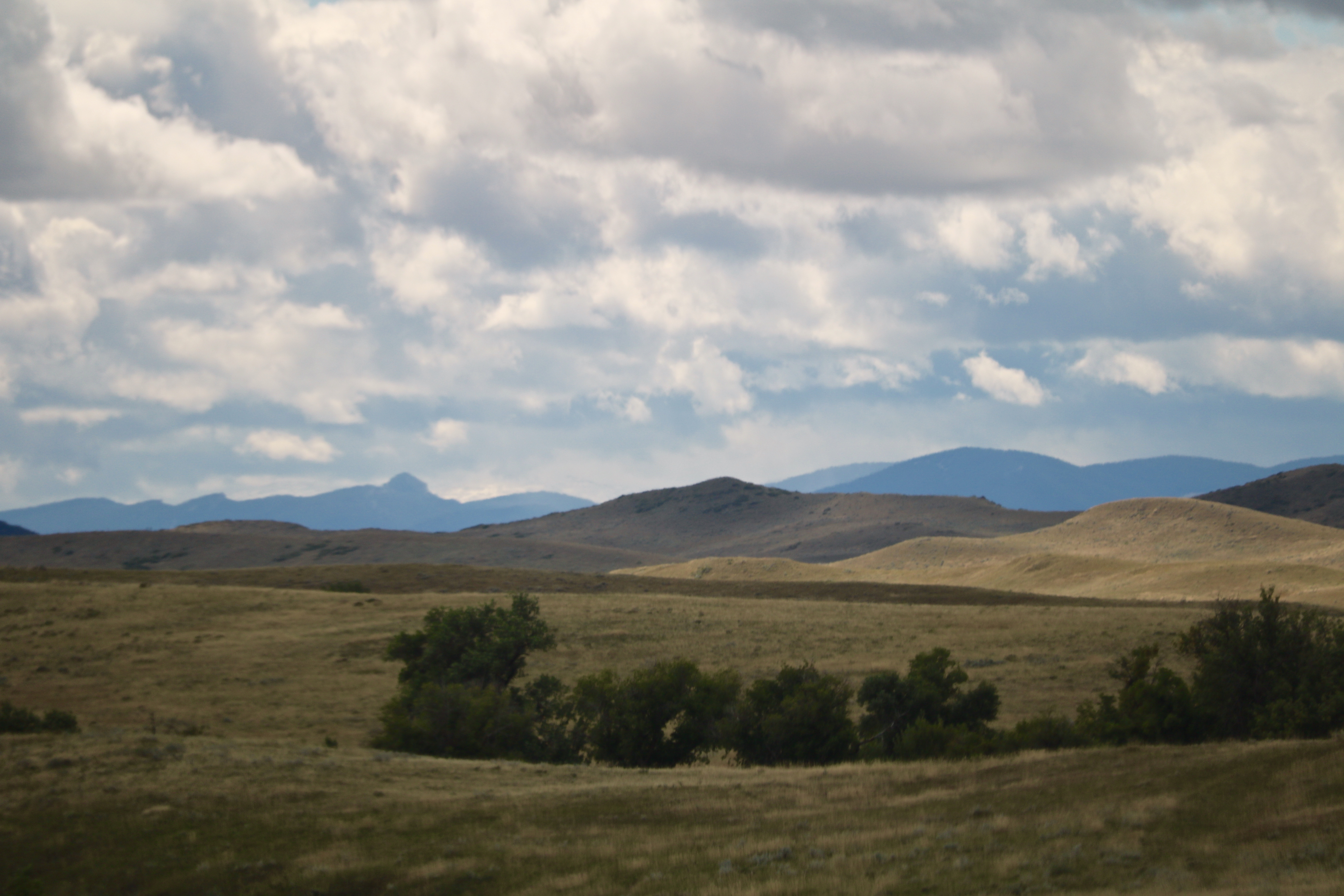
- Landforms near Wyola, Montana

- Location of Wyola, Montana
- Coordinates: 45°07′35″N 107°22′26″W
- Country: United States
- State: Montana
- County: Big Horn

Area
  - Total: 6.73 sq mi (17.42 km^{2})
  - Land: 6.73 sq mi (17.42 km^{2})
  - Water: 0 sq mi (0.00 km^{2})
- Elevation: 3,858 ft (1,176 m)

Population (2020)
  - Total: 190
  - Density: 28.3/sq mi (10.91/km^{2})
- Time zone: UTC-7 (Mountain (MST))
  - Summer (DST): UTC-6 (MDT)
- ZIP code: 59089
- Area code: 406
- FIPS code: 30-82075
- GNIS feature ID: 2409633

Wyola (Crow: Alachúa Uhpáko) is a census-designated place (CDP) in Big Horn County, Montana, United States. As of the 2020 census, Wyola had a population of 190. 79% of the residents are Native American, and the majority are members of the Crow Tribe.

The town began as a Chicago, Burlington & Quincy Railroad station stop. The Crows called this spot Ammoole, “Where they wait,” because of the train station. The post office opened in 1911.

== Geography ==
Interstate 90 passes near the community, with access from Exit 544. The Little Bighorn River runs nearby. It is part of the Crow Indian Reservation.

According to the United States Census Bureau, the CDP has a total area of 6.7 square miles (17.4 km^{2}), all land.

== Climate ==
According to the Köppen Climate Classification system, Wyola has a warm-summer humid continental climate, abbreviated "Dfb" on climate maps.

Climate data for Wyola, Montana, 1991–2020 normals, extremes 1922–2006
Month	Jan	Feb	Mar	Apr	May	Jun	Jul	Aug	Sep	Oct	Nov	Dec	Year
Record high °F (°C)	69 (21)	74 (23)	80 (27)	91 (33)	96 (36)	107 (42)	108 (42)	108 (42)	102 (39)	93 (34)	79 (26)	78 (26)	108 (42)
Mean maximum °F (°C)	57.4 (14.1)	60.9 (16.1)	68.9 (20.5)	79.0 (26.1)	86.8 (30.4)	93.7 (34.3)	99.8 (37.7)	99.0 (37.2)	92.9 (33.8)	84.2 (29.0)	69.0 (20.6)	60.3 (15.7)	101.7 (38.7)
Mean daily maximum °F (°C)	38.1 (3.4)	40.9 (4.9)	51.4 (10.8)	60.5 (15.8)	70.7 (21.5)	80.7 (27.1)	90.0 (32.2)	87.4 (30.8)	77.6 (25.3)	61.0 (16.1)	47.2 (8.4)	38.1 (3.4)	62.0 (16.6)
Daily mean °F (°C)	24.2 (−4.3)	26.4 (−3.1)	36.2 (2.3)	44.9 (7.2)	54.3 (12.4)	64.4 (18.0)	71.1 (21.7)	68.4 (20.2)	58.9 (14.9)	45.0 (7.2)	33.1 (0.6)	24.7 (−4.1)	46.0 (7.8)
Mean daily minimum °F (°C)	10.4 (−12.0)	11.9 (−11.2)	20.9 (−6.2)	29.2 (−1.6)	37.9 (3.3)	48.1 (8.9)	52.2 (11.2)	49.3 (9.6)	40.2 (4.6)	29.1 (−1.6)	19.1 (−7.2)	11.2 (−11.6)	30.0 (−1.1)
Mean minimum °F (°C)	−19.1 (−28.4)	−14.8 (−26.0)	−5.2 (−20.7)	14.1 (−9.9)	24.9 (−3.9)	33.4 (0.8)	40.0 (4.4)	38.0 (3.3)	25.8 (−3.4)	14.4 (−9.8)	−3.0 (−19.4)	−14.4 (−25.8)	−26.2 (−32.3)
Record low °F (°C)	−42 (−41)	−43 (−42)	−29 (−34)	−4 (−20)	15 (−9)	26 (−3)	28 (−2)	27 (−3)	15 (−9)	−19 (−28)	−37 (−38)	−46 (−43)	−46 (−43)
Average precipitation inches (mm)	0.39 (9.9)	0.41 (10)	0.73 (19)	2.08 (53)	3.85 (98)	2.09 (53)	1.67 (42)	0.67 (17)	1.41 (36)	1.83 (46)	0.81 (21)	0.54 (14)	16.48 (418.9)
Average snowfall inches (cm)	10.4 (26)	9.3 (24)	10.5 (27)	6.8 (17)	0.9 (2.3)	0.1 (0.25)	0.0 (0.0)	0.0 (0.0)	1.2 (3.0)	2.5 (6.4)	7.5 (19)	9.8 (25)	59.0 (150)
Average precipitation days (≥ 0.01 in)	4.5	4.2	5.9	10.0	10.3	11.2	8.0	5.6	7.5	7.6	4.7	4.2	83.7
Average snowy days (≥ 0.1 in)	5.0	4.9	4.5	2.2	0.3	0.0	0.0	0.0	0.4	1.2	3.3	5.3	27.1
Source 1: NOAA
Source 2: National Weather Service(WRCC mean maxima, mean minima, average snowfall, NWS snowy days 1922-2006)

== Demographics ==
Historical population
Census	Pop.	Note	%±
2020	190		—
U.S. Decennial Census

As of the census of 2000, there were 186 people, 52 households, and 43 families residing in the CDP. The population density was 26.0 inhabitants per square mile (10.0/km^{2}). There were 57 housing units at an average density of 8.0 per square mile (3.1/km^{2}). The racial makeup of the CDP was 18.82% White, 79.03% Native American, and 2.15% from two or more races. Hispanic or Latino of any race were 2.15% of the population.

There were 52 households, out of which 48.1% had children under the age of 18 living with them, 55.8% were married couples living together, 23.1% had a female householder with no husband present, and 17.3% were non-families. 13.5% of all households were made up of individuals, and 5.8% had someone living alone who was 65 years of age or older. The average household size was 3.58 and the average family size was 4.00.

In the CDP, the population was spread out, with 41.4% under the age of 18, 8.6% from 18 to 24, 23.1% from 25 to 44, 18.3% from 45 to 64, and 8.6% who were 65 years of age or older. The median age was 25 years. For every 100 females, there were 100.0 males. For every 100 females age 18 and over, there were 101.9 males.

The median income for a household in the CDP was $20,536, and the median income for a family was $18,750. Males had a median income of $29,375 versus $15,625 for females. The per capita income for the CDP was $7,815. About 39.5% of families and 48.0% of the population were below the poverty line, including 64.7% of those under the age of eighteen and 14.3% of those 65 or over.

== Education ==
Wyola School District educates students from kindergarten through 8th grade.

== Notable person ==
- Bill Yellowtail, served as a member of the Montana Senate and an administrator of the US EPA
