= 1990 United States House of Representatives elections in Montana =

- November 6, 1990

All 2 Montana seats to the United States House of Representatives
	Majority party	Minority party
Party	Republican	Democratic
Seats before	1	1
Seats won	1	1
Seat change	Steady	Steady
Popular vote	160,286	157,148
Percentage	50.49%	49.51%
Swing	▲3.43%	▼3.43%

Republican:
50–60%
60–70%
70–80%
80–90%
Democratic:
50–60%
60–70%
70–80%
80–90%

The 1990 United States House of Representatives elections in Montana were held on November 6, 1990 to elect the two U.S. representatives to represent the state of Montana in the 102nd Congress. The elections coincided with other elections to the House of Representatives, elections to the U.S. Senate, and various other state and local elections.

This was the last election in which Montana had two congressional districts until the 2022 elections, where it regained its second district after the 2020 census.

== Overview ==
1990 United States House of Representatives elections in Montana
Party	Votes	Percentage	Change	Seats	+/–
Republican	160,286	50.49%	▲3.43%	1	-
Democratic	157,148	49.51%	▼3.43%	1	-
Totals	317,434	100.00%	-	2	-

== District 1 ==
1990 Montana's 1st congressional district election
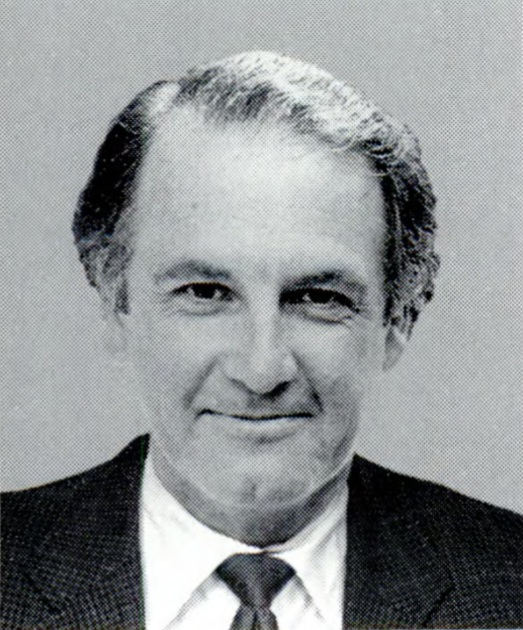

Candidate	Pat Williams	Brad Johnson
Party	Democratic	Republican
Popular vote	100,409	63,837
Percentage	61.1%	38.9%
- County results Williams: 50–60% 60–70% 70–80% 80–90% Johnson: 50–60%
U.S. Representative before election
Pat Williams
Democratic
Elected U.S. Representative
Pat Williams
Democratic

1990 Montana's 1st congressional district election
Party	Candidate	Votes	%	±%
Democratic	Pat Williams (incumbent)	100,409	61.13%	+0.36
Republican	Brad Johnson	63,837	38.87%	–0.36
Total votes		164,246	100.00%	
Democratic hold				

== District 2 ==
1990 Montana's 2nd congressional district election
Party	Candidate	Votes	%	±%
Republican	Ron Marlenee (incumbent)	96,449	62.96%	+7.44
Democratic	Don Burris	56,739	37.04%	–7.44
Total votes		153,188	100.00%	
Republican hold				
