= Lynda Moss =

American politician

Member of the Montana Senate from the 26th district
- In office January 3, 2005 – January 7, 2013
- Succeeded by: Robyn Driscoll

Personal details
- Born: March 15, 1950 (age 76) Torrington, Wyoming, U.S.
- Party: Democratic
- Spouse: widowed
- Education: University of Nebraska–Lincoln; University of Northern Iowa; Montana State University
- Occupation: Executive Director, Foundation for Community Vitality

Lynda Moss is a Democratic former member of the Montana Senate. She represented District 26 from 2004 to 2012. She was a Majority Whip in the 2008-2010 session. She was ineligible to run for election in 2012 due to Montana's term limits.

In 2012 she ran for Montana Public Service Commissioner but did not advance in the primaries.

In November 2017, Moss announced her candidacy for the U.S. House representing Montana's at-large congressional district in the 2018 U.S. federal election. She dropped out of the race in April 2018, after the deadline to have her name removed from the ballot. She ended the primary in 4th place with 5,592 votes.
