= 2018 United States House of Representatives election in Montana =

- November 6, 2018
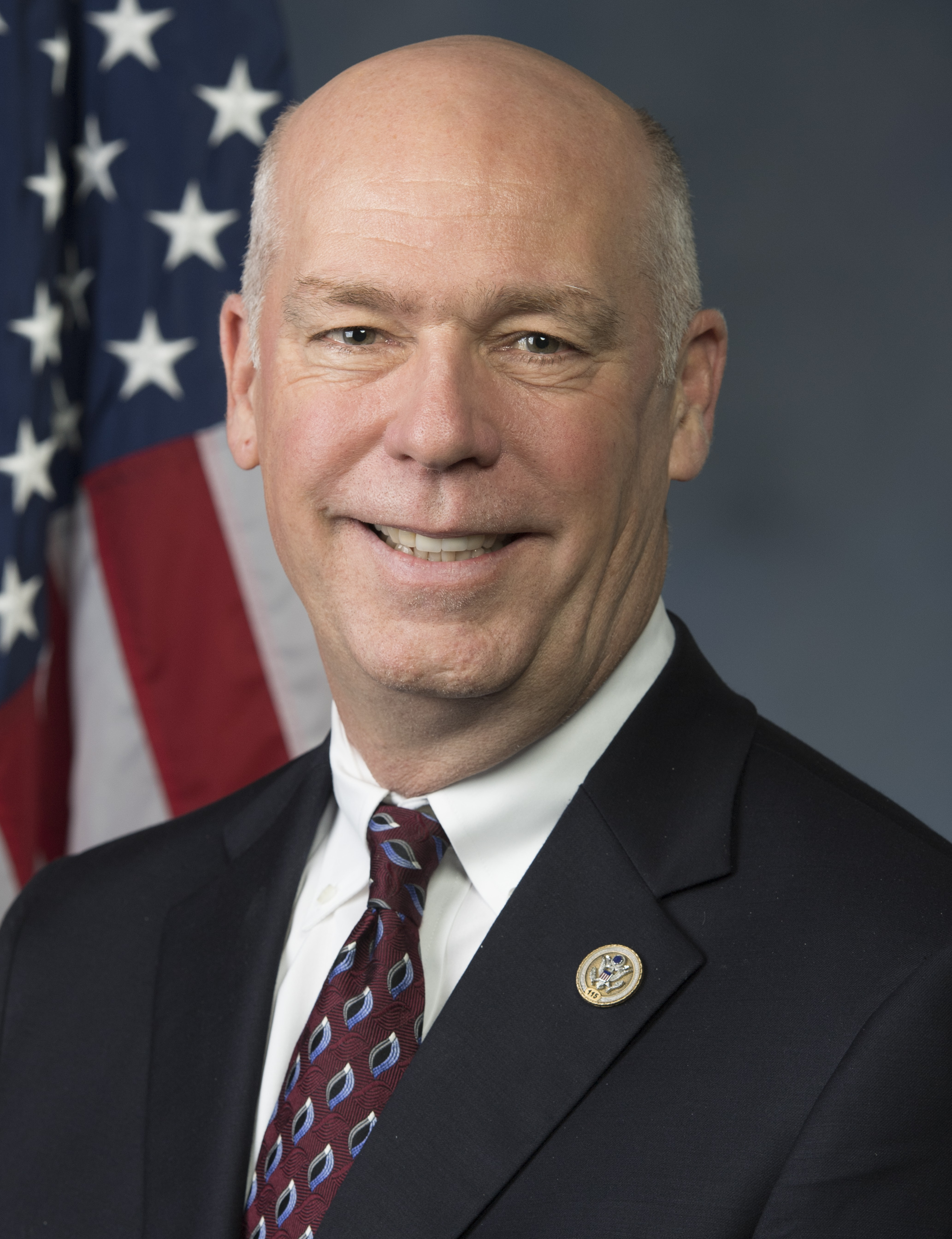

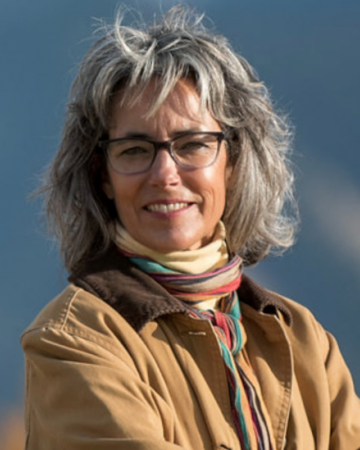
Nominee	Greg Gianforte	Kathleen Williams
Party	Republican	Democratic
Popular vote	256,661	233,284
Percentage	50.88%	46.25%
- County results Gianforte: 50–60% 60–70% 70–80% 80–90% Williams: 40–50% 50–60% 60–70% 70–80%
U.S. Representative before election
Greg Gianforte
Republican
Elected U.S. Representative
Greg Gianforte
Republican

The 2018 United States House of Representatives election in Montana was held on November 6, 2018, to elect the U.S. representative from Montana's at-large congressional district. The election coincided with other elections to the House of Representatives, elections to the United States Senate, and various state and local elections.

== Republican primary ==
=== Candidates ===
==== Declared ====
- Greg Gianforte, incumbent U.S. representative

=== Primary results ===
2018 Republican Party primary results by county: Gianforte—100% Gianforte—>90%

Republican primary results
Party	Candidate	Votes	%
Republican	Greg Gianforte (incumbent)	135,225	100
Total votes		135,225	100

== Democratic primary ==
=== Candidates ===
==== Declared ====
- John Heenan, attorney
- Grant Kier, former executive director of the Five Valleys Land Trust
- Jared Pettinato, attorney
- Kathleen Williams, former state representative

==== Withdrew ====
- Lynda Moss, former state senator (but remained on the ballot)

=== Primary results ===
Democratic Party primary results by county: Williams—50–60% Williams—40–50% Williams—<40% Heenan—<40% Heenan—40–50% Heenan—50–60% Kier—<40% Kier—40–50%

Democratic primary results
Party	Candidate	Votes	%
Democratic	Kathleen Williams	37,158	33.5
Democratic	John Heenan	35,163	31.7
Democratic	Grant Kier	26,835	24.2
Democratic	Lynda Moss (withdrawn)	5,592	5.0
Democratic	John Meyer	3,695	3.3
Democratic	Jared Pettinato	2,440	2.2
Total votes		110,883	100

== Libertarian primary ==
=== Candidates ===
==== Declared ====
- Elinor Swanson, attorney

== General election ==
=== Debates ===
- Complete video of debate, September 29, 2018
- Complete video of debate, October 6, 2018

=== Predictions ===
Source	Ranking	As of
The Cook Political Report	Lean R	November 5, 2018
Inside Elections/Rothenberg Political Report	Likely R	November 5, 2018
Sabato's Crystal Ball	Lean R	November 5, 2018

=== Endorsements ===
Greg Gianforte (R)

Federal politicians

- Donald Trump, 45th president of the United States

Organizations

- Montana Shooting Sports Association
- NRA Political Victory Fund
Kathleen Williams (D)

Federal politicians

- Jon Tester, U.S. senator (D-MT)

Newspapers

- Billings Gazette
- Bozeman Daily Chronicle
- Missoulian

Labor unions

- American Federation of Government Employees District 11
- Montana AFL-CIO
- Montana Sportsmen Alliance
- Montana State Council of Professional Fire Fighters

Organizations

- EMILY's List
- End Citizens United
- Giffords PAC
- League of Conservation Voters Action Fund
- Montana Conservation Voters
- National Committee to Preserve Social Security and Medicare
- National Organization for Women PAC
- Planned Parenthood Action Fund

=== Polling ===
View source data.

Poll source	Date(s) administered	Sample size	Margin of error	Greg Gianforte (R)	Kathleen Williams (D)	Elinor Swanson (L)	Other	Undecided
Change Research (D)	November 2–4, 2018	879	–	52%	44%	2%	–	–
Gravis Marketing	October 24–26, 2018	782	± 3.5%	48%	48%	–	–	3%
University of Montana	October 10–18, 2018	533	± 4.3%	45%	46%	2%	–	7%
Montana State University Billings	October 8–13, 2018	471	± 4.5%	44%	41%	3%	–	12%
Montana State University Bozeman	September 15 – October 6, 2018	2,079	± 2.2%	48%	40%	2%	1%	9%
Gravis Marketing	September 19–22, 2018	710	± 3.7%	51%	42%	–	–	8%
AARP/Benenson Strategy Group (D)	September 6–16, 2018	950	± 3.1%	46%	45%	–	1%	7%
University of Montana	August 13–31, 2018	466	± 4.5%	38%	51%	3%	–	8%
Gravis Marketing	June 11–13, 2018	469	± 4.5%	43%	49%	–	–	8%

=== Results ===
Gianforte defeated Kathleen Williams on November 6, 2018. Despite Williams's loss, she won the highest percent of the vote for any Democrat since Pat Williams (no relation) in 1994, making it the closest a Democrat has come to winning the house seat in Montana since 1994.

Montana's at-large congressional district, 2018
Party	Candidate	Votes	%	±%
Republican	Greg Gianforte (incumbent)	256,661	50.88%	+0.93%
Democratic	Kathleen Williams	233,284	46.25%	+1.88%
Libertarian	Elinor Swanson	14,476	2.87%	−2.81%
Total votes		504,421	100.00%	N/A
Republican hold				

== See also ==
- 2018 United States House of Representatives elections
