= 2000 Montana House of Representatives election =

- November 7, 2000

All 100 seats of the Montana House of Representatives 51 seats needed for a majority
- Registered: 698,260 ▲9.23%
- Turnout: 59.85% ▲6.86%

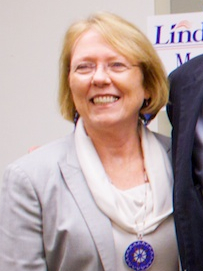
	Majority party	Minority party
Leader	Dan McGee	Kim Gillan
Party	Republican	Democratic
Leader's seat	21st district	11th district
Last election	59	41
Seats won	58	42
Seat change	▼1	▲1
Popular vote	203,963	169,327
Percentage	52.77%	43.81%
Speaker before election
John Mercer
Republican
Elected Speaker
Dan McGee
Republican

An election was held on November 7, 2000 to elect all 100 members to Montana's House of Representatives. The election coincided with elections for other offices, including U.S. President, U.S. Senate, U.S. House of Representatives, Governor and State Senate. The primary election was held on June 6, 2000.

Republicans retained control of the House despite a net loss of one seat, winning 58 seats compared to 42 seats for the Democrats.

== Results ==
=== Statewide ===
Statewide results of the 2000 Montana House of Representatives election:

Party	Candi- dates	Votes		Seats		
Party	Candi- dates	No.	%	No.	+/–	%
Republican Party	87	203,963	52.77%	58	▼1	58.00%
Democratic Party	88	169,327	43.81%	42	▲1	42.00%
Constitution Party	11	7,410	1.92%	0	Steady	0.00%
Independent	3	2,416	0.63%	0	Steady	0.00%
Reform Party	6	2,184	0.57%	0	Steady	0.00%
Libertarian Party	5	1,218	0.32%	0	Steady	0.00%
Write-in	1	16	0.00%	0	Steady	0.00%
Total	201	386,534	100.00%	100	Steady	100.00%

=== District ===
Results of the 2000 Montana House of Representatives election by district:

District	Democratic		Republican		Others		Total votes	Result
District	Votes	%	Votes	%	Votes	%	Total votes	Result
1st district	770	23.41%	2,519	76.59%	—	—	3,289	Republican hold
2nd district	3,049	100.00%	—	—	—	—	3,049	Democratic hold
3rd district	1,541	43.89%	1,970	56.11%	—	—	3,511	Republican hold
4th district	2,068	61.66%	1,286	38.34%	—	—	3,354	Democratic hold
5th district	1,194	50.81%	1,156	49.19%	—	—	2,350	Democratic gain
6th district	1,537	56.57%	1,180	43.43%	—	—	2,717	Democratic hold
7th district	2,039	57.79%	1,489	42.21%	—	—	3,528	Democratic hold
8th district	1,184	31.75%	2,545	68.25%	—	—	3,729	Republican hold
9th district	—	—	4,913	100.00%	—	—	4,913	Republican hold
10th district	1,702	33.97%	3,309	66.03%	—	—	5,011	Republican hold
11th district	2,214	62.51%	1,328	37.49%	—	—	3,542	Democratic hold
12th district	1,622	47.39%	1,801	52.61%	—	—	3,423	Republican hold
13th district	1,300	55.27%	1,052	44.73%	—	—	2,352	Democratic hold
14th district	1,255	39.17%	1,949	60.83%	—	—	3,204	Republican hold
15th district	2,118	45.23%	2,565	54.77%	—	—	4,683	Republican hold
16th district	1,749	50.36%	1,724	49.64%	—	—	3,473	Democratic gain
17th district	1,365	51.22%	1,300	48.78%	—	—	2,665	Democratic hold
18th district	1,272	39.87%	1,918	60.13%	—	—	3,190	Republican hold
19th district	2,257	51.99%	2,084	48.01%	—	—	4,341	Democratic hold
20th district	1,850	49.05%	1,922	50.95%	—	—	3,772	Republican hold
21st district	1,280	33.48%	2,543	66.52%	—	—	3,823	Republican hold
22nd district	1,740	42.90%	2,316	57.10%	—	—	4,056	Republican hold
23rd district	2,117	44.03%	2,691	55.97%	—	—	4,808	Republican hold
24th district	995	22.67%	3,395	77.33%	—	—	4,390	Republican hold
25th district	1,318	28.04%	3,016	64.17%	366	7.79%	4,700	Republican hold
26th district	1,959	52.18%	1,779	47.39%	16	0.43%	3,754	Democratic hold
27th district	3,237	46.59%	3,711	53.41%	—	—	6,948	Republican hold
28th district	1,515	27.86%	3,923	72.14%	—	—	5,438	Republican hold
29th district	2,356	66.18%	1,204	33.82%	—	—	3,560	Democratic hold
30th district	1,571	57.11%	1,180	42.89%	—	—	2,751	Democratic hold
31st district	1,906	34.17%	3,672	65.83%	—	—	5,578	Republican hold
32nd district	1,525	28.08%	3,905	71.92%	—	—	5,430	Republican hold
33rd district	1,559	33.02%	3,163	66.98%	—	—	4,722	Republican hold
34th district	1,381	34.21%	2,656	65.79%	—	—	4,037	Republican hold
35th district	3,225	62.31%	1,951	37.69%	—	—	5,176	Democratic hold
36th district	3,341	100.00%	—	—	—	—	3,341	Democratic hold
37th district	2,370	66.28%	1,206	33.72%	—	—	3,576	Democratic hold
38th district	2,661	77.20%	—	—	786	22.80%	3,447	Democratic hold
39th district	1,788	35.92%	2,561	51.45%	629	12.64%	4,978	Republican hold
40th district	1,225	24.43%	3,531	70.42%	258	5.15%	5,014	Republican hold
41st district (Note: The 41st district was tied after a recount. Republican governor Marc Racicot appointed Republican challenger James G. Whitaker to the seat.)	717	45.35%	717	45.35%	147	9.30%	1,581	Republican gain
42nd district	2,659	77.86%	—	—	756	22.14%	3,415	Democratic hold
43rd district	2,098	56.26%	1,631	43.74%	—	—	3,729	Democratic hold
44th district	1,935	68.98%	870	31.02%	—	—	2,805	Democratic hold
45th district	1,548	50.60%	1,511	49.40%	—	—	3,059	Democratic hold
46th district	1,380	60.00%	791	34.39%	129	5.61%	2,300	Democratic hold
47th district	2,267	56.66%	1,734	43.34%	—	—	4,001	Democratic hold
48th district	2,008	60.37%	1,318	39.63%	—	—	3,326	Democratic hold
49th district	2,236	48.24%	2,399	51.76%	—	—	4,635	Republican hold
50th district	—	—	3,822	100.00%	—	—	3,822	Republican hold
51st district	2,002	48.23%	2,149	51.77%	—	—	4,151	Republican hold
52nd district	2,503	53.48%	2,177	46.52%	—	—	4,680	Democratic hold
53rd district	2,564	68.50%	1,179	31.50%	—	—	3,743	Democratic hold
54th district	2,795	61.15%	1,776	38.85%	—	—	4,571	Democratic gain
55th district	2,055	43.67%	2,651	56.33%	—	—	4,706	Republican gain
56th district	1,228	38.90%	1,929	61.10%	—	—	3,157	Republican gain
57th district	3,361	100.00%	—	—	—	—	3,361	Democratic hold
58th district	2,099	42.27%	2,867	57.73%	—	—	4,966	Republican hold
59th district	1,445	31.67%	3,117	68.33%	—	—	4,562	Republican hold
60th district	1,709	35.65%	3,085	64.35%	—	—	4,794	Republican hold
61st district	—	—	4,255	68.77%	1,932	31.23%	6,187	Republican hold
62nd district	2,100	45.45%	2,246	48.61%	274	5.93%	4,620	Republican hold
63rd district	2,528	46.60%	2,897	53.40%	—	—	5,425	Republican hold
64th district	2,611	53.77%	2,245	46.23%	—	—	4,856	Democratic hold
65th district	3,311	100.00%	—	—	—	—	3,311	Democratic hold
66th district	2,808	80.09%	—	—	698	19.91%	3,506	Democratic hold
67th district	2,917	79.76%	—	—	740	20.24%	3,657	Democratic hold
68th district	1,663	48.12%	1,500	43.40%	293	8.48%	3,456	Democratic hold
69th district	3,107	59.08%	1,949	37.06%	203	3.86%	5,259	Democratic hold
70th district	2,118	46.65%	2,100	46.26%	322	7.09%	4,540	Democratic hold
71st district	1,905	43.99%	2,426	56.01%	—	—	4,331	Republican hold
72nd district	2,388	55.33%	1,928	44.67%	—	—	4,316	Democratic hold
73rd district	1,872	50.73%	—	—	1,818	49.27%	3,690	Democratic gain
74th district	2,026	42.84%	2,388	50.50%	315	6.66%	4,729	Republican hold
75th district	—	—	3,125	64.98%	1,684	35.02%	4,809	Republican hold
76th district	—	—	4,407	100.00%	—	—	4,407	Republican hold
77th district	—	—	3,333	75.10%	1,105	24.90%	4,438	Republican hold
78th district	1,597	44.16%	2,019	55.84%	—	—	3,616	Republican hold
79th district	—	—	4,022	100.00%	—	—	4,022	Republican hold
80th district	—	—	3,345	100.00%	—	—	3,345	Republican hold
81st district	—	—	3,131	82.74%	653	17.26%	3,784	Republican hold
82nd district	1,495	50.17%	1,365	45.81%	120	4.03%	2,980	Democratic gain
83rd district	1,250	32.79%	2,562	67.21%	—	—	3,812	Republican hold
84th district	1,385	36.44%	2,416	63.56%	—	—	3,801	Republican hold
85th district	2,168	100.00%	—	—	—	—	2,168	Democratic hold
86th district	1,427	43.41%	1,860	56.59%	—	—	3,287	Republican hold
87th district	1,856	47.13%	2,082	52.87%	—	—	3,938	Republican hold
88th district	—	—	3,089	100.00%	—	—	3,089	Republican hold
89th district	—	—	3,298	100.00%	—	—	3,298	Republican hold
90th district	1,652	47.01%	1,862	52.99%	—	—	3,514	Republican gain
91st district	2,270	100.00%	—	—	—	—	2,270	Democratic hold
92nd district	2,727	100.00%	—	—	—	—	2,727	Democratic hold
93rd district	1,659	37.03%	2,821	62.97%	—	—	4,480	Republican hold
94th district	—	—	3,045	100.00%	—	—	3,045	Republican hold
95th district	1,293	35.28%	2,372	64.72%	—	—	3,665	Republican hold
96th district	1,601	45.93%	1,885	54.07%	—	—	3,486	Republican hold
97th district	1,311	44.73%	1,620	55.27%	—	—	2,931	Republican hold
98th district	2,446	100.00%	—	—	—	—	2,446	Democratic hold
99th district	1,210	34.97%	2,250	65.03%	—	—	3,460	Republican hold
100th district	862	30.29%	1,984	69.71%	—	—	2,846	Republican hold
Total	169,327	43.81%	203,963	52.77%	13,244	3.43%	386,534	
