= Doug Mood =

American politician

Member of the Montana House of Representatives
- In office 1996–2004

Personal details
- Born: November 3, 1943 (age 82) Grand Rapids, Minnesota, U.S.
- Party: Republican
- Education: University of Montana
- Occupation: businessman

Doug Mood (born November 3, 1943) is an American politician in the state of Montana. He served in the Montana House of Representatives from 1996 to 2004. In 2003 he served as Speaker of the House, and from 1999 to 2001 as Speaker pro tempore. Mood is a businessman and attended the University of Montana. From 2005 to 2009, he also served on the Montana Public Service Commission as vice chair.
