= 1998 United States House of Representatives election in Montana =

- November 3, 1998
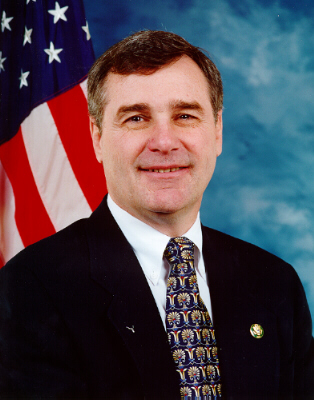

Nominee	Rick Hill	Dusty Deschamps
Party	Republican	Democratic
Popular vote	175,748	147,073
Percentage	53.01%	44.36%
- County results Hill: 40–50% 50–60% 60–70% 70–80% 80–90% Deschamps: 40–50% 50–60% 60–70%
U.S. Representative before election
Rick Hill
Republican
Elected U.S. Representative
Rick Hill
Republican

The 1998 United States House of Representatives election in Montana were held on November 3, 1998 to determine who would represent the state of Montana in the United States House of Representatives. Montana had one, at-large district in the House, apportioned according to the 1990 United States census, due to its low population. Representatives are elected for two-year terms.

== General election ==
=== Polling ===
Poll source	Date(s)	Sample size	Margin of error	Rick Hill (R)	Dusty Deschamps (D)	Other / undecided (Note: Calculated by taking the difference of 100% and all other candidates combined.)
Mason-Dixon Polling & Strategy	October 20, 1998	819	—	52%	37%	11%
Moore Information (R) (Note: Poll conducted for an unspecified Republican sponsor.)	October 14, 1998	400	—	51%	36%	13%

=== Results ===
Montana at-large congressional district election, 1998
Party	Candidate	Votes	%
Republican	Rick Hill (inc.)	175,748	53.01
Democratic	Dusty Deschamps	147,073	44.36
Libertarian	Mike Fellows	5,652	1.70
Reform	Webb Sullivan	3,078	0.93
Total votes		331,551	100.00
Republican hold			

== Notes ==
Preceded by 1996 elections	United States House elections in Montana; 1998	Succeeded by 2000 elections
