= 1996 United States House of Representatives election in Montana =

- November 5, 1996
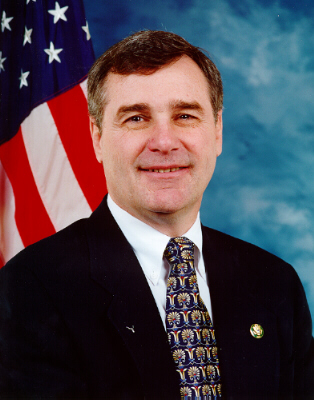

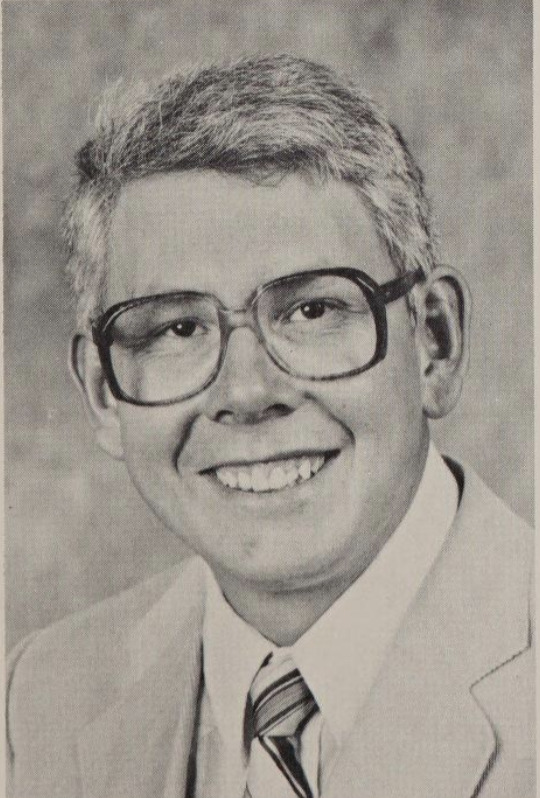
Nominee	Rick Hill	Bill Yellowtail
Party	Republican	Democratic
Popular vote	211,975	174,516
Percentage	52.41%	43.15%
- County results Hill: 40–50% 50–60% 60–70% 70–80% Yellowtail: 50–60% 60–70% 70–80%
U.S. Representative before election
Pat Williams
Democratic
Elected U.S. Representative
Rick Hill
Republican

The 1996 United States House of Representatives election in Montana was held on November 5, 1996 to determine who would represent the state of Montana in the United States House of Representatives. Montana had one, at-large district in the House, apportioned according to the 1990 United States census, due to its low population. Representatives are elected for two-year terms.

== General election ==
=== Results ===
Montana at-large congressional district election, 1996
Party	Candidate	Votes	%
Republican	Rick Hill	211,975	52.41
Democratic	Bill Yellowtail	174,516	43.15
Natural Law	Jim Brooks	17,935	4.43
Total votes		404,426	100.00
Republican gain from Democratic			

Preceded by 1994 elections	United States House elections in Montana; 1996	Succeeded by 1998 elections
