= Pat Williams (Montana politician) =

American politician (1937–2025)

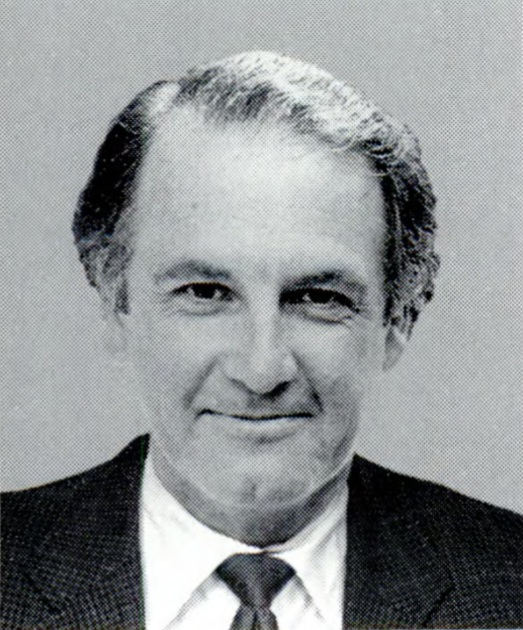
- Williams, c. 1995

Member of the U.S. House of Representatives from Montana
- In office January 3, 1979 – January 3, 1997
- Preceded by: Max Baucus
- Succeeded by: Rick Hill
- Constituency: 1st (1979–1993); At-large (1993–1997)

Personal details
- Born: John Patrick Williams; October 30, 1937 Helena, Montana, U.S.
- Died: June 25, 2025 (aged 87) Missoula, Montana, U.S.
- Party: Democratic
- Spouse: Carol Griffith
- Children: Griff Williams, Erin Williams, Whitney Williams
- Relatives: Evel Knievel (cousin)
- Education: University of Montana; William Jewell College; University of Denver (BA)

Military service
- Allegiance: United States
- Branch: Montana National Guard; Colorado National Guard
- Service years: 1961–1969

John Patrick Williams (October 30, 1937 – June 25, 2025) was an American politician who represented Montana in the United States House of Representatives from 1979 to 1997, as a member of the Democratic Party. He was Montana's longest serving U.S. Congressman.

== Background ==
Williams was born in Helena, Montana on October 30, 1937. He attended the University of Montana in Missoula, William Jewell College, and the University of Denver, Colorado, earning a BA. From 1961 to 1969, he was a member of the National Guard in Colorado and Montana, and was a teacher in Butte, Montana. His cousin was Evel Knievel, an American daredevil and showman.

== Political career ==
In 1966, Williams was elected to the Montana House of Representatives in District 23 of Silver Bow County, winning reelection in 1968. From 1969 to 1971, he served as the executive assistant to Montana Representative John Melcher. Williams was a member of the Governor's Employment and Training Council from 1972 to 1978 and served on the Montana Reapportionment Commission from 1972 to 1973.

In 1974, Williams ran an unsuccessful primary election campaign against future Senator Max Baucus for the Democratic Party nomination for Montana's U.S. House 1st District Representative. Baucus went on to win the November election, defeating Republican Dick Shoup. In 1978, Baucus retired to run for U.S. senator and Williams ran a successful primary campaign against Dorothy Bradley to win the Democratic nomination for the 1st District of Montana. That November, Williams defeated Republican Jim Waltermire in one of Montana's largest door-to-door campaigns, winning 57% of the vote and gaining election to the 96th U.S. Congress.

=== National Endowment for the Arts controversy ===
Williams was a vocal champion for Federal Arts Funding, and is credited with saving the National Endowment for the Arts (NEA) for his staunch advocacy of the NEA, Williams garnered national attention during the Culture Wars of the late 1980s and early 1990s. John Frohnmayer, who served as chairman of the National Endowment for the Arts during that tumultuous era, said "(Williams) was a tireless and fearless supporter of the arts", and that he "risked his political career in doing so".

In September 1987, the Southeastern Center for Contemporary Art (SECCA) in Winston-Salem, North Carolina, received a grant of $75,000 from the NEA to support the seventh annual Awards in the Visual Arts program. One of the works selected was photographer Andres Serrano's Piss Christ. Nearly a year later, in July 1988, the University of Pennsylvania's Institute of Contemporary Art (ICA) received an NEA grant and used it to fund a retrospective exhibition of Robert Mapplethorpe's work which included some graphic sexual imagery. The furor over the Serrano and Mapplethorpe images began when Donald E. Wildmon of the conservative American Family Association (AFA) saw the catalogue containing Serrano's photograph. Spurred by the AFA and other conservative groups, prominent Republican leaders in both the House and Senate urged that immediate action be taken against the Endowment. Thousands of citizens across the country flooded Congress with protests. Williams chaired the House Education and Labor's Postsecondary Education subcommittee which oversaw the reauthorization of the Endowment. On May 17, 1990, Wildmon threatened to send copies of works by Mapplethorpe to voters in Williams’s district. A month later, Rev. Pat Robertson took out a full-page newspaper advertisement addressed to members of Congress, which read: "Do you also want to face the voters with the charge that you are wasting their hard earned money to promote sodomy, child pornography and attacks on Jesus Christ?... There is one way to find out. Vote for the NEA appropriation just like Pat Williams, John Frohnmayer, and the gay and lesbian task force want. And make my day."

Congressional criticism of the NEA was spearheaded by senators Jesse Helms (R–NC) and Alfonse D'Amato (R–NY). Senator D'Amato tore up a copy of a catalogue featuring Piss Christ on the floor of the Senate. Later, on July 26, 1989, Helms offered an amendment to prevent federal support for "obscene and indecent" art. Aware of the NEA's desperate situation, and the impossibility of pulling together a core of support for a straight, five-year reauthorization, Representative Williams worked throughout the summer to formulate a compromise bill. In October, he announced that he and Representative Earl Thomas Coleman had devised legislation, the Williams-Coleman compromise, that would alter the structure of the Endowment's grant-making procedure; leave the obscenity determination to the U.S. Supreme Court; increase the percentage of NEA funding for state and local arts agencies; and provide for increased public access to the arts through increased funding for rural and inner-city areas and arts education. After fierce debate, the language embodied in the Williams-Coleman substitute prevailed. During the House-Senate conference on the Interior appropriations bill, the Williams-Coleman language prevailed over the amendments from Helms and Orrin Hatch (R–UT), and subsequently became law.

His support for the NEA led him to be branded 'Porno Pat' by his opponents, and sign-carrying protesters confronted him at airports in both Washington, D.C. and Montana.

From the time he left the House of Representatives in 1997, Williams continued to voice his support for the arts wherever he could, regularly spending time in Helena, Montana, where he spoke with members of the state legislature about arts policy and funding. In 2010, Montana governor Brian Schweitzer honored Williams with the Governor’s Arts Award for his efforts in saving National Endowment for the Arts. In 2017, reflecting on his time in Congress, Williams said "the opportunity to defend freedom of expression in a meaningful way" was one of the "great thrills" he had in the Congress. When asked about President Trump's threats to defund the agency once again, Williams said, "art can flourish without politics. The reverse is not true. Art reflects the diversity and pluralism of our society, which is free. And freedom is our bulwark against tyranny."

=== Re-elections ===
In 1980, Williams won reelection against Jack McDonald with 61% of the vote; in 1982 against Bob Davies with 60%; in 1984 against Gary Carlson with 67%; in 1986 against Don Allen with 62%, 1988 against Jim Fenlason with 61%; in 1990 against Brad Johnson. In 1992 Montana lost its second seat in the U.S. House of Representatives, leaving Williams to campaign against fellow incumbent Ron Marlenee.

Williams narrowly won with 50% of the vote. In 1994, he was elected to his ninth and final term, defeating Cy Jamison with 49% of the votes. He chose not to run for reelection in 1996, and Republican Rick Hill defeated Bill Yellowtail to become Montana's new U.S. Representative that year.

Williams was the last Democrat to represent Montana in the U.S. House until Sam Forstag's election in 2026.

== Later life and death ==
Williams was Senior Fellow and Regional Policy associate at the Center for the Rocky Mountain West, and served on the boards of directors for the National Association of Governing Boards of Universities and Colleges, the National Association of Job Corps, and The President's Advisory Commission for Tribal Colleges.

Williams was on the board of directors of the Student Loan Marketing Association, the now-disbanded GSE subsidiary of U.S.A. Education (Sallie Mae). Williams also wrote newspaper columns on occasion.

Nominated for a seat on the Montana Board of Regents of Higher Education in 2012 by then-governor Brian Schweitzer, Williams endured opposition to his pending confirmation. It arose due to publication of an out-of-context statement made to a New York Times reporter regarding half-a-dozen players on the University of Montana football team who had recently run afoul of the law. He referred just to those six as "thugs", but his statement was taken as referring to the entire team and program. Confusion was caused by Williams's continued attempts to clarify his statements. He was first quoted by ESPN saying, "Montana recruits thugs". Clarification of his statement did not come until his confirmation hearing; by that time the damage had been done. His confirmation to the Board of Regents was blasted to the Senate floor, and the Republican-majority Senate rejected his appointment.

Williams was a member of the ReFormers Caucus of Issue One.

Williams died at a hospital in Missoula, Montana, on June 25, 2025, at the age of 87.

U.S. House of Representatives
Preceded by Max Baucus	Member of the U.S. House of Representatives from Montana's 1st congressional district 1979–1993	Constituency abolished
New constituency	Member of the U.S. House of Representatives from Montana's at-large congressional district 1993–1997	Succeeded by Rick Hill
