= Bill Yellowtail =

American politician

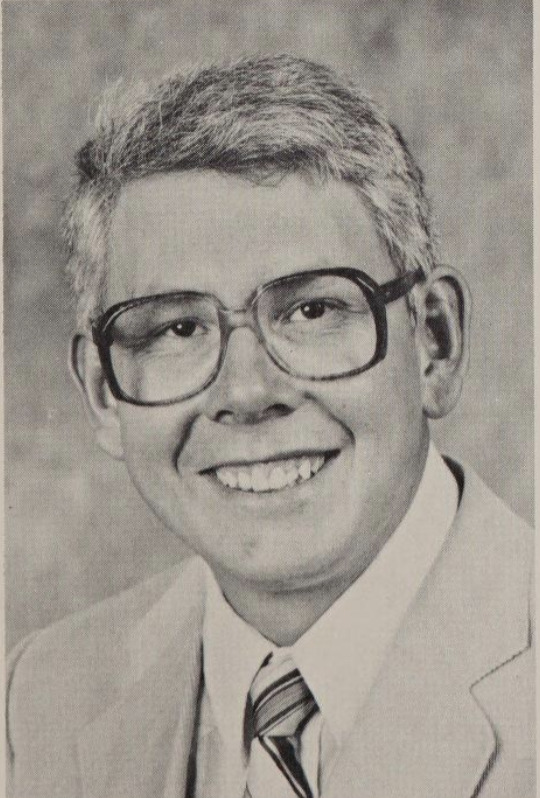
- Yellowtail in 1985

Member of the Montana Senate from the 50th district
- In office January 7, 1985 – January 1994
- Preceded by: Carroll Graham
- Succeeded by: Ramona Howe

Personal details
- Born: William Petzoldt Yellowtail Jr. January 8, 1948 (age 78) Wyola, Montana, U.S.
- Party: Democratic
- Spouse: Margarette Carlson-Yellowtail
- Education: Dartmouth College (BA)

William Petzoldt Yellowtail, Jr. (born January 8, 1948) is an American politician and businessman who served as a member of the Montana Senate and as a regional administrator of the United States Environmental Protection Agency.

== Early life and education ==
Born in Wyola, Montana, Yellowtail grew up on his family's cattle ranch on the Crow Indian Reservation in Montana. He is a 1971 graduate of Dartmouth College, where he earned a Bachelor of Arts in Geography and Environmental Studies after a brief period of absence from the college.

== Career ==
Yellowtail served on the Montana Senate from 1985 to 1993, representing Big Horn, Rosebud and Powder River counties. He also served as a Regional Administrator of the United States Environmental Protection Agency from 1994 to 1996, managing Region VIII.

Later in 1996, he ran an unsuccessful campaign against Republican Rick Hill for Montana's lone seat in the U.S. House of Representatives as a Democrat. He was defeated in a controversial campaign notorious for mudslinging efforts by himself and Hill.

He returned to the EPA shortly thereafter to his former post, but suffered further scandal for allegedly unknowingly violating the Hatch Act in 2000.

Yellowtail is an employee with Off the Beaten Path in Bozeman, Montana, and has served on the boards of directors for the Burton K. Wheeler Center for Public Policy in Montana, the National Audubon Society, and the Humanities Montana organization.

He serves on the advisory committee for the One Montana nonprofit organization. As a prominent Crow Indian, he recently served as the MSU Emeritus Katz Chair in Native American Studies and advocated for tribal relations with the EPA during his tenure as its Region VIII Administrator.
