= 2006 Montana House of Representatives election =

- November 7, 2006

All 100 seats of the Montana House of Representatives 51 seats needed for a majority
- Registered: 649,436 ▲1.72%
- Turnout: 63.30% ▼8.14%
	Majority party	Minority party	Third party
Leader	Scott Sales	John Parker	Rick Jore
Party	Republican	Democratic	Constitution
Leader's seat	68th district	23rd district	73rd district
Last election	50 seats, 50.36%	50 seats, 46.96%	0 seats, 1.60%
Seats won	50	49	1
Seat change	Steady	▼1	▲1
Popular vote	189,216	189,717	5,979
Percentage	49.13%	49.26%	1.55%
Swing	▼1.23%	▲2.30%	▼0.05%
- Results: Democratic hold Democratic gain Republican hold Republican gain Constitution gain
Speaker before election
Gary Matthews
Democratic
Elected Speaker
Scott Sales
Republican

An election was held on November 7, 2006 to elect all 100 members to Montana's House of Representatives. The election coincided with elections for other offices, including U.S. Senate, U.S. House of Representatives and State Senate. The primary election was held on June 6, 2006.

A net loss of one seat by the Democrats resulted in the Democrats winning 49 seats compared to 50 seats for the Republicans. The Republicans regained control of the House due to the Constitution Party member caucusing with the Republicans.

== Predictions ==
Source	Ranking	As of
Rothenberg	Tossup	November 4, 2006

== Results ==
=== Statewide ===
Statewide results of the 2006 Montana House of Representatives election:

Party	Candi- dates	Votes			Seats		
Party	Candi- dates	No.	%	+/–	No.	+/–	%
Republican Party	87	189,216	49.13%	▼1.23%	50	Steady	50.00%
Democratic Party	95	189,717	49.26%	▲2.30%	49	▼1	49.00%
Constitution Party	18	5,979	1.55%	▼0.05%	1	▲1	1.00%
Independent	1	257	0.07%	▼0.76%	0	Steady	0.00%
Total	201	385,169	100.00%	Steady	100	Steady	100.00%

=== District ===
Results of the 2006 Montana House of Representatives election by district:

District	Democratic		Republican		Others		Total votes	Result
District	Votes	%	Votes	%	Votes	%	Total votes	Result
1st district	1,576	47.16%	1,594	47.70%	172	5.15%	3,342	Republican Hold
2nd district	1,543	39.87%	2,118	54.73%	209	5.40%	3,870	Republican Hold
3rd district	1,815	50.80%	1,560	43.66%	198	5.54%	3,573	Democratic GAIN
4th district	2,602	62.26%	1,577	37.74%	—	—	4,179	Democratic Hold
5th district	1,426	31.91%	3,043	68.09%	—	—	4,469	Republican Hold
6th district	1,937	40.22%	2,305	47.86%	574	11.92%	4,816	Republican Hold
7th district	1,165	33.21%	2,343	66.79%	—	—	3,508	Republican Hold
8th district	1,553	49.41%	1,590	50.59%	—	—	3,143	Republican GAIN
9th district	1,878	38.75%	2,969	61.25%	—	—	4,847	Republican Hold
10th district	1,248	26.33%	3,492	73.67%	—	—	4,740	Republican Hold
11th district	1,836	40.42%	2,706	59.58%	—	—	4,542	Republican Hold
12th district	1,643	44.55%	—	—	2,045	55.45%	3,688	Constitution GAIN
13th district	1,868	40.72%	2,462	53.67%	257	5.60%	4,587	Republican GAIN
14th district	1,519	37.65%	2,516	62.35%	—	—	4,035	Republican Hold
15th district	2,360	100.00%	—	—	—	—	2,360	Democratic Hold
16th district	2,342	100.00%	—	—	—	—	2,342	Democratic Hold
17th district	1,321	32.74%	2,714	67.26%	—	—	4,035	Republican Hold
18th district	1,724	37.27%	2,812	60.79%	90	1.95%	4,626	Republican Hold
19th district	1,835	46.94%	2,074	53.06%	—	—	3,909	Republican Hold
20th district	1,597	49.75%	1,518	47.29%	95	2.96%	3,210	Democratic Hold
21st district	1,880	55.56%	1,346	39.78%	158	4.67%	3,384	Democratic Hold
22nd district	1,643	57.79%	1,084	38.13%	116	4.08%	2,843	Democratic Hold
23rd district	1,851	73.08%	—	—	682	26.92%	2,533	Democratic Hold
24th district	1,002	56.45%	696	39.21%	77	4.34%	1,775	Democratic Hold
25th district	2,757	67.31%	1,217	29.71%	122	2.98%	4,096	Democratic Hold
26th district	1,743	55.62%	1,391	44.38%	—	—	3,134	Democratic Hold
27th district	—	—	3,280	100.00%	—	—	3,280	Republican Hold
28th district	1,628	38.87%	2,560	61.13%	—	—	4,188	Republican Hold
29th district	1,772	41.90%	2,457	58.10%	—	—	4,229	Republican Hold
30th district	1,550	34.14%	2,990	65.86%	—	—	4,540	Republican Hold
31st district	2,547	100.00%	—	—	—	—	2,547	Democratic Hold
32nd district	2,257	100.00%	—	—	—	—	2,257	Democratic Hold
33rd district	1,890	58.12%	1,362	41.88%	—	—	3,252	Democratic Hold
34th district	2,612	100.00%	—	—	—	—	2,612	Democratic Hold
35th district	—	—	3,218	82.92%	663	17.08%	3,881	Republican Hold
36th district	2,329	53.23%	2,046	46.77%	—	—	4,375	Democratic GAIN
37th district	—	—	3,167	100.00%	—	—	3,167	Republican Hold
38th district	1,655	43.12%	2,183	56.88%	—	—	3,838	Republican GAIN
39th district	1,143	25.43%	3,352	74.57%	—	—	4,495	Republican Hold
40th district	1,884	53.19%	1,658	46.81%	—	—	3,542	Democratic Hold
41st district	1,657	63.12%	968	36.88%	—	—	2,625	Democratic Hold
42nd district	2,708	100.00%	—	—	—	—	2,708	Democratic Hold
43rd district	1,944	46.08%	2,120	50.25%	155	3.67%	4,219	Republican GAIN
44th district	1,572	43.70%	2,025	56.30%	—	—	3,597	Republican Hold
45th district	1,087	26.95%	2,946	73.05%	—	—	4,033	Republican Hold
46th district	1,696	33.53%	3,362	66.47%	—	—	5,058	Republican Hold
47th district	1,449	33.37%	2,893	66.63%	—	—	4,342	Republican Hold
48th district	1,938	55.87%	1,531	44.13%	—	—	3,469	Democratic Hold
49th district	1,794	58.63%	1,266	41.37%	—	—	3,060	Democratic GAIN
50th district	1,508	37.63%	2,499	62.37%	—	—	4,007	Republican Hold
51st district	1,618	58.90%	1,129	41.10%	—	—	2,747	Democratic Hold
52nd district	2,118	60.65%	1,374	39.35%	—	—	3,492	Democratic Hold
53rd district	1,129	35.14%	2,084	64.86%	—	—	3,213	Republican Hold
54th district	1,569	58.50%	1,113	41.50%	—	—	2,682	Democratic Hold
55th district	2,048	43.34%	2,677	56.66%	—	—	4,725	Republican Hold
56th district	—	—	4,239	100.00%	—	—	4,239	Republican Hold
57th district	2,026	37.81%	3,333	62.19%	—	—	5,359	Republican Hold
58th district	1,968	49.96%	1,971	50.04%	—	—	3,939	Republican GAIN
59th district	2,109	46.93%	2,234	49.71%	151	3.36%	4,494	Republican Hold
60th district	—	—	3,523	100.00%	—	—	3,523	Republican Hold
61st district	1,744	37.95%	2,852	62.05%	—	—	4,596	Republican Hold
62nd district	2,163	53.16%	1,906	46.84%	—	—	4,069	Democratic GAIN
63rd district	2,774	50.32%	2,739	49.68%	—	—	5,513	Democratic GAIN
64th district	2,413	57.00%	1,820	43.00%	—	—	4,233	Democratic Hold
65th district	1,734	65.68%	906	34.32%	—	—	2,640	Democratic Hold
66th district	2,443	65.81%	1,269	34.19%	—	—	3,712	Democratic Hold
67th district	1,189	28.89%	2,927	71.11%	—	—	4,116	Republican Hold
68th district	1,943	40.00%	2,915	60.00%	—	—	4,858	Republican Hold
69th district	1,791	35.08%	3,314	64.92%	—	—	5,105	Republican Hold
70th district	2,342	47.10%	2,630	52.90%	—	—	4,972	Republican Hold
71st district	1,861	38.77%	2,939	61.23%	—	—	4,800	Republican Hold
72nd district	959	24.28%	2,991	75.72%	—	—	3,950	Republican Hold
73rd district	2,766	100.00%	—	—	—	—	2,766	Democratic Hold
74th district	3,392	100.00%	—	—	—	—	3,392	Democratic Hold
75th district	3,006	100.00%	—	—	—	—	3,006	Democratic Hold
76th district	2,241	82.48%	476	17.52%	—	—	2,717	Democratic Hold
77th district	2,404	49.74%	2,429	50.26%	—	—	4,833	Republican Hold
78th district	1,852	52.88%	1,650	47.12%	—	—	3,502	Democratic Hold
79th district	2,921	65.38%	1,547	34.62%	—	—	4,468	Democratic Hold
80th district	2,555	62.15%	1,556	37.85%	—	—	4,111	Democratic Hold
81st district	2,799	73.29%	1,020	26.71%	—	—	3,819	Democratic Hold
82nd district	2,980	70.73%	1,233	29.27%	—	—	4,213	Democratic Hold
83rd district	1,269	31.32%	2,783	68.68%	—	—	4,052	Republican Hold
84th district	1,382	32.47%	2,874	67.53%	—	—	4,256	Republican Hold
85th district	2,301	100.00%	—	—	—	—	2,301	Democratic Hold
86th district	3,277	100.00%	—	—	—	—	3,277	Democratic Hold
87th district	1,491	31.71%	3,070	65.29%	141	3.00%	4,702	Republican Hold
88th district	1,893	45.69%	2,250	54.31%	—	—	4,143	Republican Hold
89th district	1,384	28.91%	3,260	68.10%	143	2.99%	4,787	Republican Hold
90th district	1,840	41.47%	2,597	58.53%	—	—	4,437	Republican Hold
91st district	2,178	58.13%	1,569	41.87%	—	—	3,747	Democratic Hold
92nd district	2,999	60.17%	1,985	39.83%	—	—	4,984	Democratic Hold
93rd district	3,067	63.67%	1,750	36.33%	—	—	4,817	Democratic Hold
94th district	2,711	59.75%	1,826	40.25%	—	—	4,537	Democratic Hold
95th district	2,508	59.93%	1,677	40.07%	—	—	4,185	Democratic Hold
96th district	2,044	55.68%	1,439	39.20%	188	5.12%	3,671	Democratic Hold
97th district	2,982	70.76%	1,232	29.24%	—	—	4,214	Democratic Hold
98th district	2,497	58.19%	1,794	41.81%	—	—	4,291	Democratic Hold
99th district	3,086	70.46%	1,294	29.54%	—	—	4,380	Democratic Hold
100th district	1,667	45.34%	2,010	54.66%	—	—	3,677	Republican Hold
Total	189,717	49.26%	189,216	49.13%	6,236	1.62%	385,169	
