= 2012 Montana House of Representatives election =

- November 6, 2012

All 100 seats of the Montana House of Representatives 51 seats needed for a majority
- Registered: 681,608 ▲4.65%
- Turnout: 72.18% ▲15.82%
| | Majority party | Minority party |
|---|---|---|
| Leader | Mark Blasdel | Chuck Hunter |
| Party | Republican | Democratic |
| Leader's seat | 10th district | 79th district |
| Last election | 68 | 32 |
| Seats won | 61 | 39 |
| Seat change | ▼7 | ▲7 |
| Popular vote | 256,265 | 180,446 |
| Percentage | 57.58% | 40.54% |
| Swing | ▼3.38% | ▲2.99% |
- Results: Democratic hold Democratic gain Republican hold Republican gain
Speaker before election
Mike Milburn
Republican
Elected Speaker
Mark Blasdel
Republican

An election was held on November 6, 2012 to elect all 100 members to Montana's House of Representatives. The election coincided with elections for other offices, including U.S. President, U.S. Senate, U.S. House of Representatives, Governor and State Senate. The primary election was held on June 5, 2012.

Republicans retained control of the House despite a net loss of seven seats, winning 61 seats compared to 39 seats for the Democrats.

== Predictions ==
| Source | Ranking | As of |
|---|---|---|
| Governing | Safe R | October 24, 2012 |

== Results ==
=== Statewide ===
Statewide results of the 2012 Montana House of Representatives election:

| Party | Candi- dates | Votes | | | Seats | | |
| Party | Candi- dates | No. | % | +/– | No. | +/– | % |
|---|---|---|---|---|---|---|---|
| Republican Party | 94 | 256,265 | 57.58% | ▼3.38% | 61 | ▼7 | 61.00% |
| Democratic Party | 83 | 180,446 | 40.54% | ▲2.99% | 39 | ▲7 | 39.00% |
| Independent | 3 | 4,371 | 0.98% | ▲0.81% | 0 | Steady | 0.00% |
| Libertarian Party | 7 | 4,012 | 0.90% | ▲0.31% | 0 | Steady | 0.00% |
| Total | 187 | 445,094 | 100.00% | Steady | 100 | Steady | 100.00% |

=== District ===
Results of the 2012 Montana House of Representatives election by district:

| District | Democratic | | Republican | | Others | | Total votes | Result |
| District | Votes | % | Votes | % | Votes | % | Total votes | Result |
|---|---|---|---|---|---|---|---|---|
| 1st district | — | — | 3,165 | 100.00% | — | — | 3,165 | Republican Hold |
| 2nd district | — | — | 4,183 | 100.00% | — | — | 4,183 | Republican Hold |
| 3rd district | 1,996 | 43.73% | 2,333 | 51.12% | 235 | 5.15% | 4,564 | Republican Hold |
| 4th district | 2,832 | 54.23% | 2,390 | 45.77% | — | — | 5,222 | Democratic GAIN |
| 5th district | 1,484 | 25.28% | 4,387 | 74.72% | — | — | 5,871 | Republican Hold |
| 6th district | 2,117 | 33.13% | 4,273 | 66.87% | — | — | 6,390 | Republican Hold |
| 7th district | 1,288 | 31.01% | 2,865 | 68.99% | — | — | 4,153 | Republican Hold |
| 8th district | 1,527 | 40.42% | 2,251 | 59.58% | — | — | 3,778 | Republican Hold |
| 9th district | 1,912 | 32.55% | 3,962 | 67.45% | — | — | 5,874 | Republican Hold |
| 10th district | 1,550 | 25.20% | 4,602 | 74.80% | — | — | 6,152 | Republican Hold |
| 11th district | 1,777 | 33.39% | 3,545 | 66.61% | — | — | 5,322 | Republican Hold |
| 12th district | 1,712 | 40.31% | 2,535 | 59.69% | — | — | 4,247 | Republican Hold |
| 13th district | 1,289 | 24.47% | 3,978 | 75.53% | — | — | 5,267 | Republican Hold |
| 14th district | 1,431 | 29.25% | 2,408 | 49.22% | 1,053 | 21.52% | 4,892 | Republican Hold |
| 15th district | 1,969 | 57.66% | 1,446 | 42.34% | — | — | 3,415 | Democratic GAIN |
| 16th district | 1,934 | 66.83% | 960 | 33.17% | — | — | 2,894 | Democratic GAIN |
| 17th district | 1,959 | 45.34% | 2,362 | 54.66% | — | — | 4,321 | Republican Hold |
| 18th district | 1,752 | 33.93% | 3,412 | 66.07% | — | — | 5,164 | Republican Hold |
| 19th district | 1,979 | 43.13% | 2,609 | 56.87% | — | — | 4,588 | Republican Hold |
| 20th district | 1,657 | 48.38% | 1,768 | 51.62% | — | — | 3,425 | Republican Hold |
| 21st district | 2,032 | 55.44% | 1,633 | 44.56% | — | — | 3,665 | Democratic Hold |
| 22nd district | 1,638 | 53.65% | 1,415 | 46.35% | — | — | 3,053 | Democratic Hold |
| 23rd district | 1,780 | 60.59% | 1,158 | 39.41% | — | — | 2,938 | Democratic Hold |
| 24th district | 849 | 41.37% | 1,203 | 58.63% | — | — | 2,052 | Republican Hold |
| 25th district | 2,571 | 50.73% | 2,497 | 49.27% | — | — | 5,068 | Democratic GAIN |
| 26th district | 2,391 | 70.84% | — | — | 984 | 29.16% | 3,375 | Democratic Hold |
| 27th district | — | — | 3,172 | 100.00% | — | — | 3,172 | Republican Hold |
| 28th district | — | — | 3,514 | 100.00% | — | — | 3,514 | Republican Hold |
| 29th district | — | — | 3,664 | 100.00% | — | — | 3,664 | Republican Hold |
| 30th district | — | — | 4,068 | 100.00% | — | — | 4,068 | Republican Hold |
| 31st district | 1,986 | 100.00% | — | — | — | — | 1,986 | Democratic Hold |
| 32nd district | 2,409 | 100.00% | — | — | — | — | 2,409 | Democratic Hold |
| 33rd district | 1,667 | 45.72% | 1,979 | 54.28% | — | — | 3,646 | Republican Hold |
| 34th district | 1,594 | 45.21% | 1,932 | 54.79% | — | — | 3,526 | Republican Hold |
| 35th district | 1,529 | 34.12% | 2,952 | 65.88% | — | — | 4,481 | Republican Hold |
| 36th district | — | — | 3,488 | 100.00% | — | — | 3,488 | Republican Hold |
| 37th district | — | — | 3,745 | 100.00% | — | — | 3,745 | Republican Hold |
| 38th district | 1,847 | 42.87% | 2,461 | 57.13% | — | — | 4,308 | Republican Hold |
| 39th district | — | — | 4,225 | 100.00% | — | — | 4,225 | Republican Hold |
| 40th district | 3,121 | 100.00% | — | — | — | — | 3,121 | Democratic Hold |
| 41st district | 1,359 | 56.32% | 1,054 | 43.68% | — | — | 2,413 | Democratic GAIN |
| 42nd district | 2,610 | 100.00% | — | — | — | — | 2,610 | Democratic Hold |
| 43rd district | 1,161 | 25.13% | 3,459 | 74.87% | — | — | 4,620 | Republican Hold |
| 44th district | 1,605 | 38.47% | 2,567 | 61.53% | — | — | 4,172 | Republican Hold |
| 45th district | 1,299 | 28.54% | 3,252 | 71.46% | — | — | 4,551 | Republican Hold |
| 46th district | — | — | 5,762 | 100.00% | — | — | 5,762 | Republican Hold |
| 47th district | 2,182 | 42.68% | 2,930 | 57.32% | — | — | 5,112 | Republican Hold |
| 48th district | 1,722 | 41.24% | 2,454 | 58.76% | — | — | 4,176 | Republican Hold |
| 49th district | 1,949 | 61.70% | 1,210 | 38.30% | — | — | 3,159 | Democratic Hold |
| 50th district | 1,858 | 45.31% | 2,243 | 54.69% | — | — | 4,101 | Republican Hold |
| 51st district | 1,985 | 67.49% | 956 | 32.51% | — | — | 2,941 | Democratic Hold |
| 52nd district | 2,122 | 61.78% | 1,313 | 38.22% | — | — | 3,435 | Democratic Hold |
| 53rd district | 1,621 | 47.04% | 1,825 | 52.96% | — | — | 3,446 | Republican Hold |
| 54th district | 1,931 | 58.69% | 1,359 | 41.31% | — | — | 3,290 | Democratic Hold |
| 55th district | 1,924 | 36.85% | 3,297 | 63.15% | — | — | 5,221 | Republican Hold |
| 56th district | — | — | 4,255 | 100.00% | — | — | 4,255 | Republican Hold |
| 57th district | 1,998 | 29.50% | 4,775 | 70.50% | — | — | 6,773 | Republican Hold |
| 58th district | 1,889 | 41.48% | 2,665 | 58.52% | — | — | 4,554 | Republican Hold |
| 59th district | 2,514 | 48.56% | 2,663 | 51.44% | — | — | 5,177 | Republican Hold |
| 60th district | 1,538 | 30.65% | 3,480 | 69.35% | — | — | 5,018 | Republican Hold |
| 61st district | — | — | 4,487 | 100.00% | — | — | 4,487 | Republican Hold |
| 62nd district | 2,431 | 53.69% | 2,097 | 46.31% | — | — | 4,528 | Democratic GAIN |
| 63rd district | 3,567 | 51.02% | 3,425 | 48.98% | — | — | 6,992 | Democratic GAIN |
| 64th district | 3,708 | 63.03% | 2,175 | 36.97% | — | — | 5,883 | Democratic Hold |
| 65th district | 2,298 | 69.91% | 989 | 30.09% | — | — | 3,287 | Democratic Hold |
| 66th district | 3,270 | 68.58% | 1,498 | 31.42% | — | — | 4,768 | Democratic Hold |
| 67th district | — | — | 5,548 | 100.00% | — | — | 5,548 | Republican Hold |
| 68th district | — | — | 4,724 | 100.00% | — | — | 4,724 | Republican Hold |
| 69th district | — | — | 5,642 | 100.00% | — | — | 5,642 | Republican Hold |
| 70th district | 2,347 | 36.87% | 3,182 | 49.98% | 837 | 13.15% | 6,366 | Republican Hold |
| 71st district | — | — | 3,311 | 57.17% | 2,481 | 42.83% | 5,792 | Republican Hold |
| 72nd district | 1,186 | 25.43% | 3,477 | 74.57% | — | — | 4,663 | Republican Hold |
| 73rd district | 2,788 | 66.10% | 1,430 | 33.90% | — | — | 4,218 | Democratic Hold |
| 74th district | 2,675 | 54.75% | 2,211 | 45.25% | — | — | 4,886 | Democratic GAIN |
| 75th district | 2,875 | 72.91% | 1,068 | 27.09% | — | — | 3,943 | Democratic Hold |
| 76th district | 2,827 | 100.00% | — | — | — | — | 2,827 | Democratic Hold |
| 77th district | 2,418 | 43.16% | 3,184 | 56.84% | — | — | 5,602 | Republican Hold |
| 78th district | 2,116 | 47.80% | 2,311 | 52.20% | — | — | 4,427 | Republican Hold |
| 79th district | 3,027 | 62.07% | 1,850 | 37.93% | — | — | 4,877 | Democratic Hold |
| 80th district | 2,273 | 44.50% | 2,835 | 55.50% | — | — | 5,108 | Republican Hold |
| 81st district | 2,919 | 72.76% | 1,093 | 27.24% | — | — | 4,012 | Democratic Hold |
| 82nd district | 2,789 | 54.11% | 2,365 | 45.89% | — | — | 5,154 | Democratic Hold |
| 83rd district | 1,866 | 36.42% | 3,257 | 63.58% | — | — | 5,123 | Republican Hold |
| 84th district | 1,496 | 26.88% | 3,632 | 65.27% | 437 | 7.85% | 5,565 | Republican Hold |
| 85th district | 1,573 | 51.81% | 1,463 | 48.19% | — | — | 3,036 | Democratic Hold |
| 86th district | 3,126 | 69.39% | 1,379 | 30.61% | — | — | 4,505 | Democratic Hold |
| 87th district | 1,277 | 23.32% | 3,749 | 68.45% | 451 | 8.23% | 5,477 | Republican Hold |
| 88th district | 1,815 | 36.93% | 2,883 | 58.66% | 217 | 4.42% | 4,915 | Republican Hold |
| 89th district | 1,670 | 29.30% | 3,657 | 64.16% | 373 | 6.54% | 5,700 | Republican Hold |
| 90th district | — | — | 3,552 | 72.98% | 1,315 | 27.02% | 4,867 | Republican Hold |
| 91st district | 2,232 | 49.50% | 2,277 | 50.50% | — | — | 4,509 | Republican GAIN |
| 92nd district | 3,712 | 66.59% | 1,862 | 33.41% | — | — | 5,574 | Democratic Hold |
| 93rd district | 3,475 | 65.14% | 1,860 | 34.86% | — | — | 5,335 | Democratic Hold |
| 94th district | 3,271 | 64.07% | 1,834 | 35.93% | — | — | 5,105 | Democratic Hold |
| 95th district | 3,006 | 63.52% | 1,726 | 36.48% | — | — | 4,732 | Democratic Hold |
| 96th district | 3,088 | 66.57% | 1,551 | 33.43% | — | — | 4,639 | Democratic Hold |
| 97th district | 3,166 | 65.75% | 1,649 | 34.25% | — | — | 4,815 | Democratic Hold |
| 98th district | 3,472 | 58.45% | 2,468 | 41.55% | — | — | 5,940 | Democratic Hold |
| 99th district | 3,792 | 66.63% | 1,899 | 33.37% | — | — | 5,691 | Democratic Hold |
| 100th district | 2,049 | 44.02% | 2,606 | 55.98% | — | — | 4,655 | Republican Hold |
| Total | 180,446 | 40.54% | 256,265 | 57.58% | 8,383 | 1.88% | 445,094 | |
