= 2002 United States House of Representatives election in Montana =

- November 5, 2002
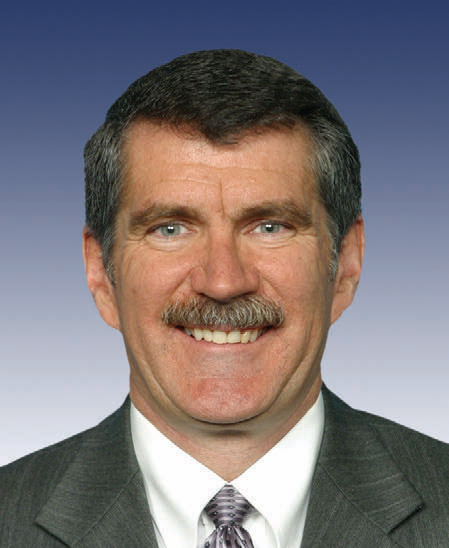

| Nominee | Denny Rehberg | Steve Kelly |
| Party | Republican | Democratic |
| Popular vote | 214,100 | 108,233 |
| Percentage | 64.62% | 32.67% |
- County results Rehberg: 50–60% 60–70% 70–80% 80–90% Kelly: 50–60%
U.S. Representative before election
Denny Rehberg
Republican
Elected U.S. Representative
Denny Rehberg
Republican

The 2002 United States House of Representatives election in Montana was held on November 5, 2002, to determine who would represent the state of Montana in the United States House of Representatives. Montana has one at-large district in the House, apportioned according to the 2000 United States census, due to its low population. Representatives are elected for two-year terms.

Republican Denny Rehberg, the former lieutenant governor of Montana, sought re-election to a second term in the United States House of Representatives, winning the party's renomination unopposed in the June 4 primary. Two Democrats — rancher Robert Candee and small business owner Steve Kelly — sought their party's nomination. Kelly ultimately prevailed with 74 percent of the vote in the primary. In the general election, Rehberg won with almost 65 percent of the vote to Kelly's 33 percent, while Libertarian Mike Fellows received nearly 3 percent.

== Background ==
Kelly, the Democratic nominee, had previously run for office as both an independent and a Republican, in 1994 running as an independent candidate for the US House and earning 9 percent of the vote, and in 1998 running as a candidate in the Republican primary for Gallatin County commissioner. He observed that his independent candidacy eight years earlier had displeased some Democrats, who felt that he pulled votes from the Democratic nominee. However, Kelly observed that the Democrat still won the race, so he was not a spoiler.

== Democratic primary ==
=== Candidates ===
- Robert Candee, rancher
- Steve Kelly, businessman and 1994 independent candidate for Congress

=== Results ===
Democratic primary results
| Party | Candidate | Votes | % |
|---|---|---|---|
| Democratic | Steve Kelly | 40,441 | 74.28% |
| Democratic | Robert Candee | 14,003 | 25.72% |
| Total votes | | 54,444 | 100.0% |

== Republican primary ==
=== Candidates ===
- Denny Rehberg, incumbent, former lieutenant governor of Montana (1990–1996), and 1996 Republican Senate nominee

=== Results ===
Republican primary results
| Party | Candidate | Votes | % |
|---|---|---|---|
| Republican | Denny Rehberg (incumbent) | 83,617 | 100% |
| Total votes | | 83,617 | 100.0% |

== General election ==
=== Predictions ===
| Source | Ranking | As of |
|---|---|---|
| Sabato's Crystal Ball | Safe R | November 4, 2002 |
| New York Times | Safe R | October 14, 2002 |

=== Campaign ===
Rehberg won the endorsement of the Montana Teamsters Union, the first time in Montana history that the union endorsed a Republican statewide candidate. The candidates' first debate was held on June 22, at the annual convention of the Montana Newspaper Association.

=== Results ===
Montana at-large congressional district election, 2002
| Party | Candidate | Votes | % |
|---|---|---|---|
| Republican | Denny Rehberg (inc.) | 214,100 | 64.62 |
| Democratic | Steve D. Kelly | 108,233 | 32.67 |
| Libertarian | Mike Fellows | 8,988 | 2.71 |
| Total votes | | 331,321 | 100.00 |
| Republican hold | | | |

==== Counties that flipped from Democratic to Republican ====
- Missoula (largest city: Missoula)
- Cascade (largest city: Great Falls)
- Lewis and Clark (largest city: Helena)
- Rosebud (largest city: Colstrip)
- Roosevelt (largest city: Wolf Point)
- Hill (largest city: Havre)
- Blaine (largest city: Chinooko)
- Sheridan (largest city: Plentywood)

=== Aftermath ===
Kelly would go on to be the Green nominee for Senate in 2018, although he would be removed from the ballot prior to Election Day.

| Preceded by 2000 elections | United States House elections in Montana; 2002 | Succeeded by 2004 elections |
