= 2000 United States House of Representatives election in Montana =

- November 7, 2000
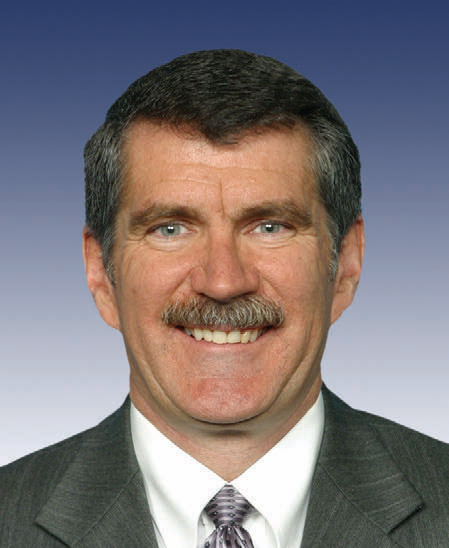

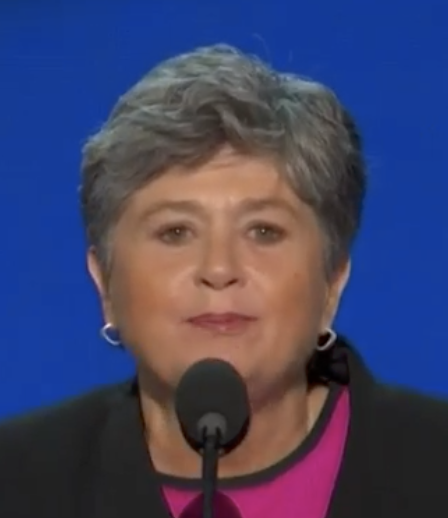
Nominee	Denny Rehberg	Nancy Keenan
Party	Republican	Democratic
Popular vote	211,418	189,971
Percentage	51.50%	46.28%
- County results Rehberg: 50–60% 60–70% 70–80% 80–90% Keenan: 50–60% 60–70% 70–80%
U.S. Representative before election
Rick Hill
Republican
Elected U.S. Representative
Denny Rehberg
Republican

The 2000 United States House of Representatives election in Montana were held on November 7, 2000 to determine who would represent the state of Montana in the United States House of Representatives. Montana had one, at-large district in the House, apportioned according to the 1990 United States census, due to its low population. Representatives are elected for two-year terms.

== General election ==
=== Polling ===
Poll source	Date(s)	Sample size	Margin of error	Denny Rehberg (R)	Nancy Keenan (D)	Other / undecided (Note: Calculated by taking the difference of 100% and all other candidates combined.)
Mason-Dixon Polling & Strategy	October 24, 2000	628	—	46%	43%	11%
Montana State University Billings Mountain States Poll	October 21, 2000	403	—	44%	42%	14%

=== Results ===
Montana At-large congressional district election, 2000
Party	Candidate	Votes	%
Republican	Denny Rehberg	211,418	51.50%
Democratic	Nancy Keenan	189,971	46.28%
Libertarian	James J. Tikalsky	9,132	2.22%
Total votes		410,521	100.00%
Republican hold			

Counties that flipped from Republican to Democratic

- Blaine (largest city: Chinook)
- Sheridn (largest city: Plentywood)
- Rosebud (largest city: Colstrip)

Preceded by 1998 elections	United States House elections in Montana; 2000	Succeeded by 2002 elections
