= Ron Marlenee =

American politician (1935–2020)

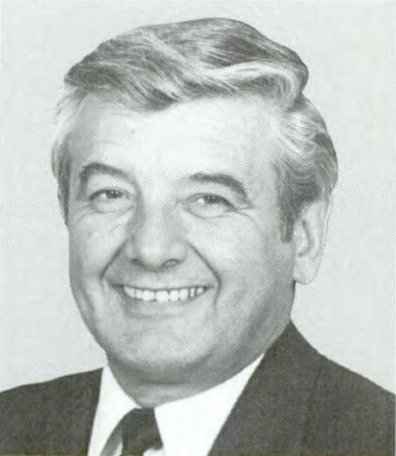

Member of the U.S. House of Representatives from Montana's 2nd district
- In office January 3, 1977 – January 3, 1993
- Preceded by: John Melcher
- Succeeded by: Constituency abolished

Personal details
- Born: Ronald Charles Marlenee; August 8, 1935 Scobey, Montana, U.S.
- Died: April 26, 2020 (aged 84) Bozeman, Montana, U.S.
- Party: Republican
- Spouse: Cynthia "Cindy" Marlenee (née Tiemann)
- Children: Sheila Wolff, Casey Marlenee, Allison Helland
- Education: Montana State University, University of Montana, Reisch School of Auctioneering
- Occupation: Rancher, Businessman, United States Congressman

Ronald Charles Marlenee (August 8, 1935 – April 26, 2020) was an American Republican politician who served in the United States House of Representatives from the U.S. state of Montana from January 3, 1977, to January 3, 1993. He represented Montana's 2nd congressional district.

== Early life ==
Ron Marlenee was born on August 8, 1935 in Scobey, Montana, the son of Charles and Margaret (Darchuk) Marlenee and the brother of Bob and Lanney. He was educated in the public schools of Daniels County, and attended Montana State University in Bozeman, the University of Montana in Missoula, and the Reisch School of Auctioneering in Mason City, Iowa.

== Political career ==
Marlenee was an auctioneer, farmer and rancher. He was active in politics as a Republican, and held several party posts in Daniels County. From 1975 to 1976 he was the Second Congressional District's member of the Montana Republican Committee's executive board. In 1976 he was elected to the Ninety-fifth Congress. He was reelected seven times, and served from January 3, 1977, to January 3, 1993. During his time in Congress, he gained the nickname "Dr. No" for his frequent rejections of governmental bills, since he believed in reducing governmental involvement in public life. While in Congress, he served on the House Interior and Agricultural committees. Environmentalists were unhappy with Marlenee's voting record, and in 1992 he was named by Environmental Action as one of Congress' "Dirty Dozen."

After the 1990 Census, Montana's declining population growth rate resulted in the loss of its 2nd district, reducing the state to one at-large district. Marlenee ran unsuccessfully against the Democratic nominee, Pat Williams, who represented the 1st district. The election was hotly contested, and Williams won with 50.5% of the vote. Ron Marlenee was the longest-serving Republican representative from Montana in the House of Representatives. Following the 1992 election, Marlenee left politics and never ran for a political position again.

== Political stances and policies ==
Marlenee was known as a conservative Republican who fought for small businesses, limited government, Second Amendment rights, and a balanced budget. He also battled against federal control over state lands(1) and was involved in agricultural issues, particularly focusing on the needs of family farms and small business owners.

Marlenee described himself as a "multi-use" person who believed in multiple uses of federal lands, including drilling, mining, and recreation. In particular, he took a firm stance against environmentalists, and he termed conservationists "fern feelers and prairie fairies."

== Personal life ==
Ron was both a Freemason and a Shriner over the course of his life. Marlenee's first wife was Carmen Willard, and the two had five children: David, Mike, Sheila, Casey, and Allison. In 1978, he married his second wife Cindy Tiemann.

== Selected publications ==
- Marlenee, Ronald Charles, and Morris King Udall. 1978. Designating the Great Bear Wilderness, Flathead National Forest, and enlarging the Bob Marshall Wilderness, Flathead and Lewis and Clark National Forests, State of Montana. September 22, 1978. -- Committed to the Committee of the Whole House on the State of the Union and ordered to be printed. Washington, DC: [Verlag nicht ermittelbar].
- Marlenee, Ronald Charles, and Morris King Udall. 1977. Providing for the study of certain lands to determine their suitability for designation as wilderness in accordance with the Wilderness Act of 1964, and for other purposes. September 23, 1977. -- Committed to the Committee of the Whole House on the State of the Union and ordered to be printed. Washington, DC: [Verlag nicht ermittelbar].
- United States, Eligio De la Garza, and Ronald Charles Marlenee. 1984. Soil conservation act of 1984. April 24, 1984. -- Committed to the Committee of the Whole House on the State of the Union and ordered to be printed. http://docs.newsbank.com/select/serialset/12F17B91C7ABA368.html.
- United States, Larry Edwin Craig, Ronald Charles Marlenee, and Morris King Udall. 1987. Withdrawing certain federal lands in the State of California for military purposes, and for other purposes. October 1, 1987. -- Ordered to be printed. http://docs.newsbank.com/select/serialset/130FD73EC44692F0.html.
- Bauman, Robert Edmund, Marvin Henry Edwards, James Paul Johnson, Manuel Lujan, Ronald Charles Marlenee, David Daniel Marriott, Eldon Dean Rudd, et al. 1977. Enhancing the outdoor recreation opportunities for the people of the United States by expanding the National Park System, by providing access to and within areas of the National Park System, and for other purposes. September 8, 1977. -- Committed to the Committee of the Whole House on the State of the Union and ordered to be printed. Washington, DC: [Verlag nicht ermittelbar].

== Later years ==
After leaving Congress, Marlenee resided in Bozeman, Montana with his wife Cindy and son Casey. He continued to be active in Montana politics. For many years he hosted or participated in fundraisers and other campaign events for Republican candidates.

Marlenee also became a lobbyist for a variety of organizations. In addition, he became the director of legislative affairs for the Safari Club International, a hunting club in Washington, D.C., and co-founded the Western Tradition Partnership (now the American Tradition Partnership), which works in Montana politics and bills itself as a "advocate for issues like water, forest management, and energy development." According to the Bozeman Chronicle, a "state election regulator later found that the group had provided illegal contributions to state Republican candidates." In addition, Marlenee was responsible for establishing a veteran's memorial in Miles City, Montana.

He died in Bozeman on April 26, 2020.

U.S. House of Representatives
Preceded by John Melcher	Member of the U.S. House of Representatives from Montana's 2nd congressional district 1977–1993	District eliminated
