= Rick Hill =

American politician (born 1946)

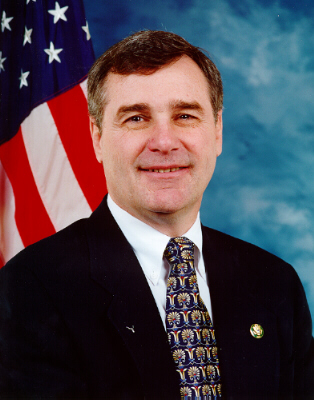

Member of the U.S. House of Representatives from Montana's at-large district
- In office January 3, 1997 – January 3, 2001
- Preceded by: Pat Williams
- Succeeded by: Denny Rehberg

Personal details
- Born: Richard Allan Hill; December 30, 1946 (age 79) Grand Rapids, Minnesota, U.S.
- Party: Republican
- Education: St. Cloud State University (BA); Concord University (JD)

Richard Allan Hill (born December 30, 1946) is an American politician and businessman who served as a member of the United States House of Representatives from Montana. He was the Republican nominee for Governor of Montana in 2012.

== Early life and education ==
Hill was born in Grand Rapids, Minnesota. He was one of four children and grew up in a one-room apartment in the back of a tire repair shop. At age four, Hill was paralyzed by polio. In 1964, he graduated from Aitkin High School in Aitkin, Minnesota. In 1968, he graduated from Saint Cloud State University Hill received his Juris Doctor degree in 2005 from the Concord Law School in Los Angeles, California.

== Early career ==
Hill owned a surety bonding company prior to entering politics.

He served as Republican precinct committeeman and state committeeman from Lewis and Clark County, Montana; member, served on the board of directors, Montana Science and Technology Alliance; and chaired the Montana State Worker’s Compensation Board from 1993 to 1996.

In 1993, Governor Marc Racicot selected Hill to act as chairman of the board of directors of the Montana State Fund, where he worked in a volunteer, unpaid capacity for three years. At the time Hill became chairman, the organization had a $500 million debt. After leaving the post, he worked to cut the pay and pensions of the state employees charged with administering the fund.

== U.S. House of Representatives ==
=== Elections ===
In 1996, Hill ran for the U.S. House of Representatives in Montana's at-large congressional district. He won the Republican primary with 44% of the vote. In the general election, he defeated Democrat Bill Yellowtail, who had been a Regional Administrator for the United States Environmental Protection Agency, 52%–43%. In November 1998, Hill won re-election to a second term, defeating the Democratic nominee, longtime Missoula County Attorney Dusty Deschamps, 53%–44%.

In 2000, Hill decided not to run for re-election to a third term, citing vision problems, which were subsequently corrected. The election was won by Republican nominee Denny Rehberg, who defeated Nancy Keenan, then the three-term State Superintendent of Public Instruction.

=== Tenure ===
Between 1997 and 2000, Hill sponsored 32 bills, of which 22 did not made it out of committee and four were passed into law by Congress. He voted with the Republican party 91% of the time.

=== Committee assignments ===
Hill served on the U.S. House Committee on Natural Resources.

== Later career ==
In 2006, Hill was nominated by President George W. Bush to be a member of the board of directors of the Corporation for National and Community Service. He was confirmed by the senate on June 28, 2007, and his term expired on June 10, 2009.

=== 2012 gubernatorial election ===
In November 2010, Hill announced he would run for Governor of Montana in 2012. He selected State Senator Jon Sonju as his running mate. On November 6, 2012, Hill lost to his Democratic opponent, Steve Bullock, in the general election by a margin of 48.9%–47.3%.

== Personal life ==
In May 1976, Hill filed for divorce from his first wife, Mary Hill (née Spaulding), after having an affair with another woman. In 1980, after the couple failed to reconcile, Spaulding filed for divorce and Hill obtained custody of the three children. He married his second wife, Betti, in 1983.

U.S. House of Representatives
Preceded by Pat Williams	Member of the U.S. House of Representatives from Montana's at-large congressional district 1997–2001	Succeeded by Denny Rehberg
Party political offices
Preceded by Roy Brown	Republican nominee for Governor of Montana; 2012	Succeeded by Greg Gianforte
U.S. order of precedence (ceremonial)
Preceded by Bob Beauprez as Former U.S. Representative	Order of precedence of the United States as Former U.S. Representative	Succeeded by Matt Rosendale as Former U.S. Representative
