= 1994 United States House of Representatives election in Montana =

- November 8, 1994
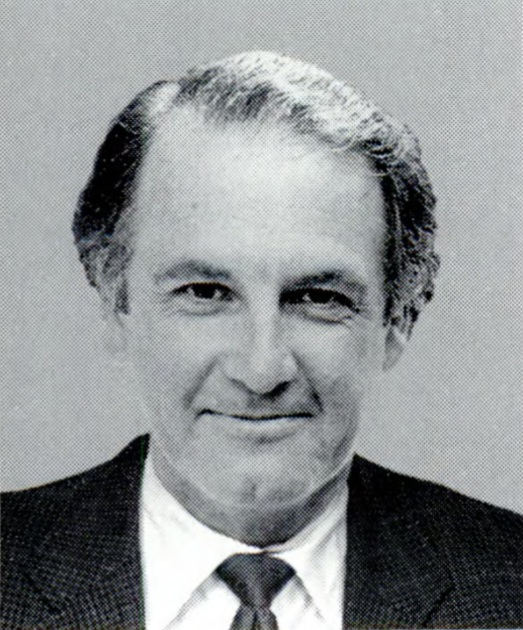

Nominee	Pat Williams	Cy Jamison	Steve Kelly
Party	Democratic	Republican	Independent
Popular vote	171,372	148,715	32,046
Percentage	48.67%	42.23%	9.10%
- County results Williams: 40–50% 50–60% 60–70% 70–80% Jamison: 40–50% 50–60% 60–70%
U.S. Representative before election
Pat Williams
Democratic
Elected U.S. Representative
Pat Williams
Democratic

The 1994 United States House of Representatives election in Montana was held on November 8, 1994, to determine who would represent the state of Montana in the United States House of Representatives. Montana at the time had one, at-large district in the House, apportioned according to the 1990 United States census. Representatives are elected for two-year terms.

This is the last time Democrats won Montana's at-large congressional district as of 2026, following the district's elimination in 2022, and the last time a Democrat was elected to the House from Montana until 2026.

== General election ==
=== Results ===
Montana at-large congressional district election, 1994
Party	Candidate	Votes	%
Democratic	John Patrick Williams (inc.)	171,372	48.67
Republican	Cy Jamison	148,715	42.23
Independent	Steve Kelly	32,046	9.10
Total votes		352,133	100.00
Democratic hold			

Preceded by 1992 elections	United States House elections in Montana; 1994	Succeeded by 1996 elections
