= Montana's congressional delegations =

Since Montana became a U.S. state in 1889, it has sent congressional delegations to the United States Senate and the United States House of Representatives. Each state elects two senators to serve for six years. Before the Seventeenth Amendment took effect in 1913, senators were elected by the Montana State Legislature. Members of the House of Representatives are elected to two-year terms. Before becoming a state, the Territory of Montana elected a non-voting delegate at-large to Congress from 1864 to 1889.

A total of 54 people have served either the Territory or State of Montana: 17 in the Senate, 32 in the House, and five in both houses. The longest-serving senator is Max Baucus, in office from 1978 to 2014. The longest-serving representative is Pat Williams, in office for 18 years from 1979 to 1997. One woman has been a member of Montana's congressional delegation, Jeannette Rankin, as a representative. She was the first woman in the United States Congress.

The current dean of the Montana delegation is Senator Steve Daines, having been a member of Congress since 2013.

== United States Senate ==
Current U.S. senators from Montana
Montana CPVI (2025): R+10	Class I senator	Class II senator
Montana CPVI (2025): R+10	Tim Sheehy (Junior senator) (Bozeman)	Steve Daines (Senior senator) (Belgrade)
Party	Republican	Republican
Incumbent since	January 3, 2025	January 3, 2015

Each state elects two senators by statewide popular vote every six years. The terms of the two senators are staggered so that they are not elected in the same year. Montana's senators are elected in the years from classes I and II. Senators were originally chosen by the Montana Legislature until the Seventeenth Amendment came into force in 1913.

There have been twenty-two senators elected from Montana, of whom fourteen have been Democrats and eight have been Republicans. Montana's current senators are Republican Steve Daines, in office since 2015, and Republican Tim Sheehy, in office since 2025.

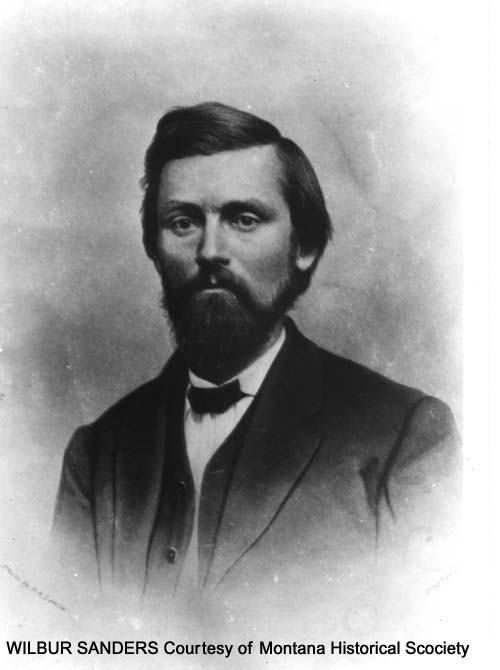
Wilbur F. Sanders, Montana's first senator

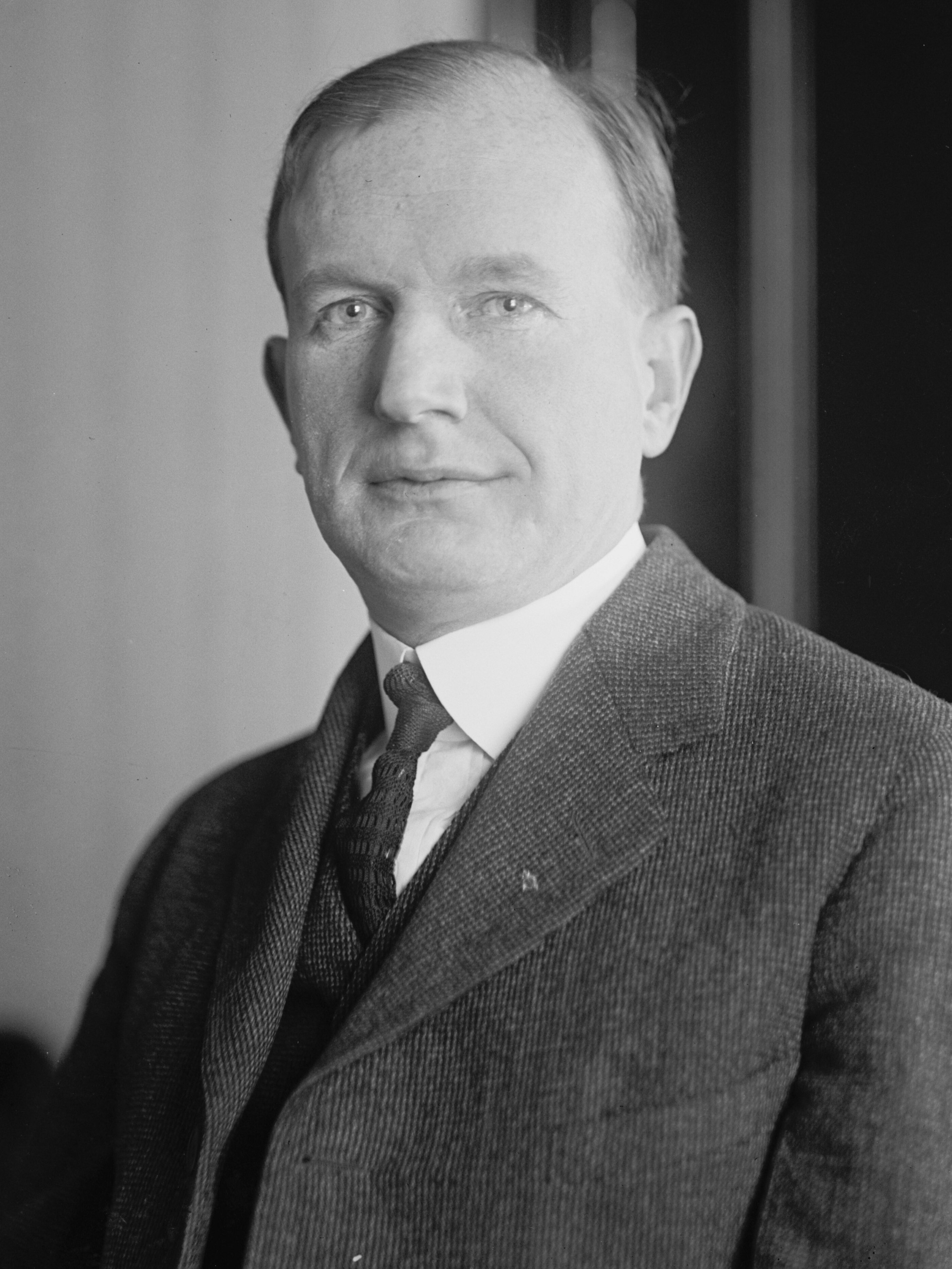
Burton K. Wheeler, senator from Montana for 24 years

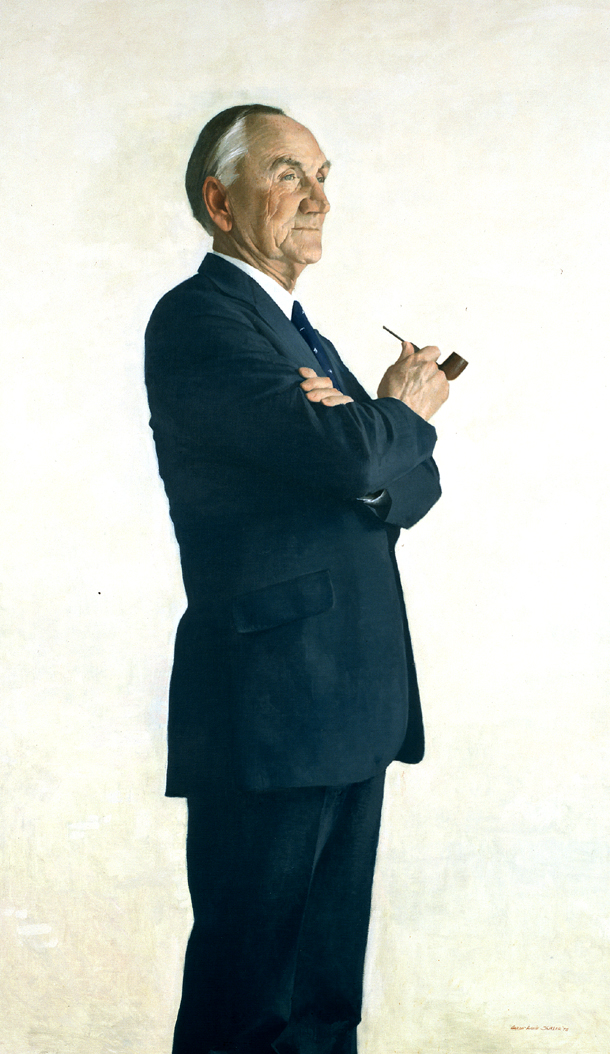
Mike Mansfield, Senate Majority Leader from 1961 to 1977

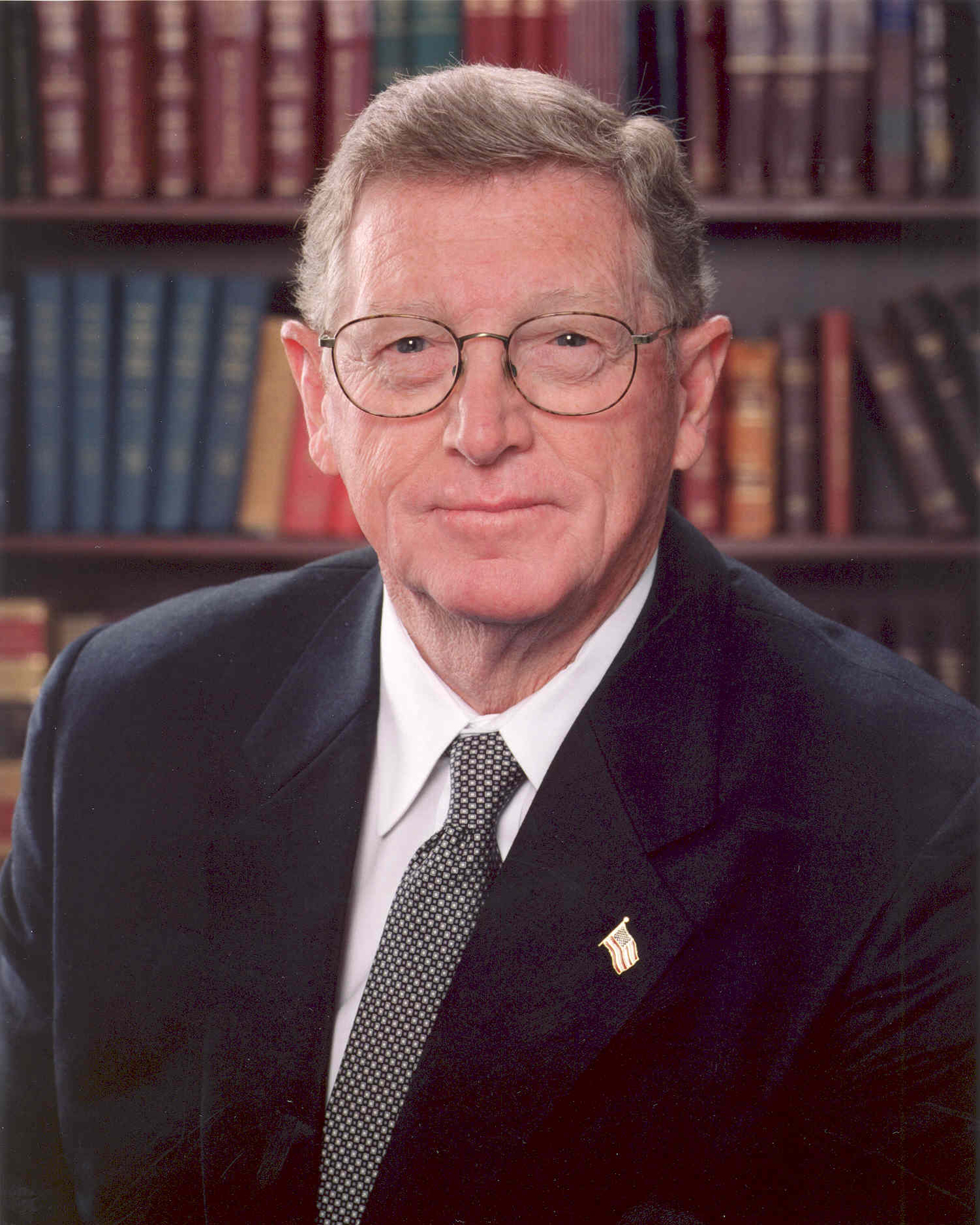
Conrad Burns, senator from Montana for 18 years

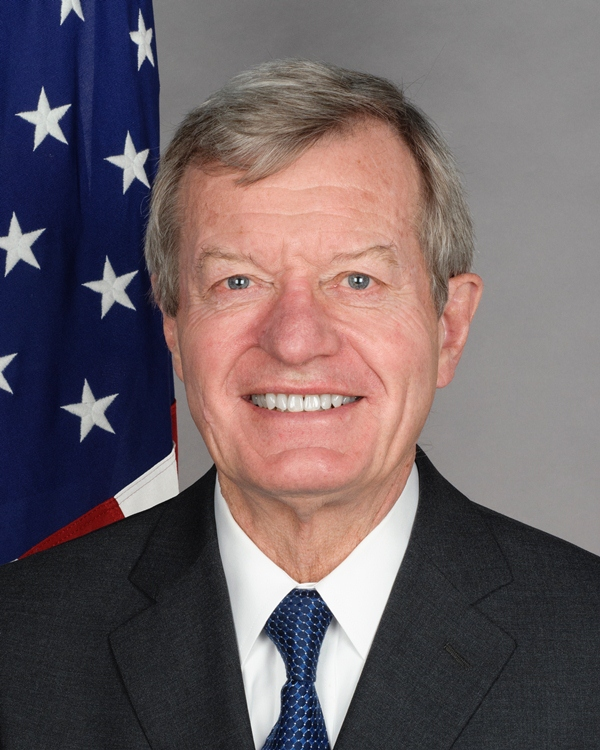
Max Baucus, Montana's longest-serving senator, in office from 1978 to 2014

Class I senator	Congress	Class II senator
Wilbur F. Sanders (R)	51st (1889–1891)	Thomas C. Power (R)
Wilbur F. Sanders (R)	52nd (1891–1893)	Thomas C. Power (R)
vacant (Note: Seat was vacant due to failure of legislature to elect a senator by the beginning of the Congress.)	53rd (1893–1895)	Thomas C. Power (R)
Lee Mantle (R) (Note: Lee Mantle was appointed to fill the vacancy, but was not seated; he was later elected to the term.)	53rd (1893–1895)	Thomas C. Power (R)
Lee Mantle (R)	54th (1895–1897)	Thomas H. Carter (R)
Lee Mantle (SvR)	55th (1897–1899)	Thomas H. Carter (R)
William A. Clark (D) (Note: The Senate refused to seat Clark after it was revealed that he had gained the seat through bribery.)	56th (1899–1901)	Thomas H. Carter (R)
Paris Gibson (D) (Note: Elected to fill the vacancy caused by the previous representative being elected to the next term, but vacating the seat before the term began.)	57th (1901–1903)	William A. Clark (D)
Paris Gibson (D)	58th (1903–1905)	William A. Clark (D)
Thomas H. Carter (R)	59th (1905–1907)	William A. Clark (D)
Thomas H. Carter (R)	60th (1907–1909)	Joseph M. Dixon (R)
Thomas H. Carter (R)	61st (1909–1911)	Joseph M. Dixon (R)
Henry L. Myers (D)	62nd (1911–1913)	Joseph M. Dixon (R)
Henry L. Myers (D)	63rd (1913–1915)	Thomas J. Walsh (D) (Note: Died in office.)
Henry L. Myers (D)	64th (1915–1917)	Thomas J. Walsh (D)
Henry L. Myers (D)	65th (1917–1919)	Thomas J. Walsh (D)
Henry L. Myers (D)	66th (1919–1921)	Thomas J. Walsh (D)
Henry L. Myers (D)	67th (1921–1923)	Thomas J. Walsh (D)
Burton K. Wheeler (D)	68th (1923–1925)	Thomas J. Walsh (D)
Burton K. Wheeler (D)	69th (1925–1927)	Thomas J. Walsh (D)
Burton K. Wheeler (D)	70th (1927–1929)	Thomas J. Walsh (D)
Burton K. Wheeler (D)	71st (1929–1931)	Thomas J. Walsh (D)
Burton K. Wheeler (D)	72nd (1931–1933)	Thomas J. Walsh (D)
Burton K. Wheeler (D)	73rd (1933–1935)	John E. Erickson (D) (Note: Was appointed to the office, and was later replaced by an elected successor.)
Burton K. Wheeler (D)	73rd (1933–1935)	James E. Murray (D)
Burton K. Wheeler (D)	74th (1935–1937)	James E. Murray (D)
Burton K. Wheeler (D)	75th (1937–1939)	James E. Murray (D)
Burton K. Wheeler (D)	76th (1939–1941)	James E. Murray (D)
Burton K. Wheeler (D)	77th (1941–1943)	James E. Murray (D)
Burton K. Wheeler (D)	78th (1943–1945)	James E. Murray (D)
Burton K. Wheeler (D)	79th (1945–1947)	James E. Murray (D)
Zales Ecton (R)	80th (1947–1949)	James E. Murray (D)
Zales Ecton (R)	81st (1949–1951)	James E. Murray (D)
Zales Ecton (R)	82nd (1951–1953)	James E. Murray (D)
Mike Mansfield (D)	83rd (1953–1955)	James E. Murray (D)
Mike Mansfield (D)	84th (1955–1957)	James E. Murray (D)
Mike Mansfield (D)	85th (1957–1959)	James E. Murray (D)
Mike Mansfield (D)	86th (1959–1961)	James E. Murray (D)
Mike Mansfield (D)	87th (1961–1963)	Lee Metcalf (D)
Mike Mansfield (D)	88th (1963–1965)	Lee Metcalf (D)
Mike Mansfield (D)	89th (1965–1967)	Lee Metcalf (D)
Mike Mansfield (D)	90th (1967–1969)	Lee Metcalf (D)
Mike Mansfield (D)	91st (1969–1971)	Lee Metcalf (D)
Mike Mansfield (D)	92nd (1971–1973)	Lee Metcalf (D)
Mike Mansfield (D)	93rd (1973–1975)	Lee Metcalf (D)
Mike Mansfield (D)	94th (1975–1977)	Lee Metcalf (D)
John Melcher (D)	95th (1977–1979)	Lee Metcalf (D)
John Melcher (D)	95th (1977–1979)	Paul G. Hatfield (D)
John Melcher (D)	95th (1977–1979)	Max Baucus (D) (Note: Resigned.)
John Melcher (D)	96th (1979–1981)	Max Baucus (D)
John Melcher (D)	97th (1981–1983)	Max Baucus (D)
John Melcher (D)	98th (1983–1985)	Max Baucus (D)
John Melcher (D)	99th (1985–1987)	Max Baucus (D)
John Melcher (D)	100th (1987–1989)	Max Baucus (D)
Conrad Burns (R)	101st (1989–1991)	Max Baucus (D)
Conrad Burns (R)	102nd (1991–1993)	Max Baucus (D)
Conrad Burns (R)	103rd (1993–1995)	Max Baucus (D)
Conrad Burns (R)	104th (1995–1997)	Max Baucus (D)
Conrad Burns (R)	105th (1997–1999)	Max Baucus (D)
Conrad Burns (R)	106th (1999–2001)	Max Baucus (D)
Conrad Burns (R)	107th (2001–2003)	Max Baucus (D)
Conrad Burns (R)	108th (2003–2005)	Max Baucus (D)
Conrad Burns (R)	109th (2005–2007)	Max Baucus (D)
Jon Tester (D)	110th (2007–2009)	Max Baucus (D)
Jon Tester (D)	111th (2009–2011)	Max Baucus (D)
Jon Tester (D)	112th (2011–2013)	Max Baucus (D)
Jon Tester (D)	113th (2013–2015)	Max Baucus (D)
Jon Tester (D)	113th (2013–2015)	John Walsh (D)
Jon Tester (D)	114th (2015–2017)	Steve Daines (R)
Jon Tester (D)	115th (2017–2019)	Steve Daines (R)
Jon Tester (D)	116th (2019–2021)	Steve Daines (R)
Jon Tester (D)	117th (2021–2023)	Steve Daines (R)
Jon Tester (D)	118th (2023–2025)	Steve Daines (R)
Tim Sheehy (R)	119th (2025–2027)	Steve Daines (R)
Tim Sheehy (R)	115th (2017–2019)	Kurt Alme (R)

== U.S. House of Representatives ==
=== Current representatives ===
Current U.S. representatives from Montana
District	Member (Residence)	Party	Incumbent since	CPVI (2025)	District map
1st	Ryan Zinke (Whitefish)	Republican	January 3, 2023	R+5	
2nd	Troy Downing (Big Sky)	Republican	January 3, 2025	R+15	

=== Delegates from Montana Territory ===
The Territory of Montana was an organized incorporated territory of the United States formed on May 26, 1864. The territory initially consisted of present-day Montana. The boundaries of the territory did not change during its existence.

The territorial delegates were elected to two-year terms. Delegates were allowed to serve on committees, debate, and submit legislation, but were not permitted to vote on bills. Delegates only served in the House of Representatives as there was no representation in the Senate until Montana became a state.

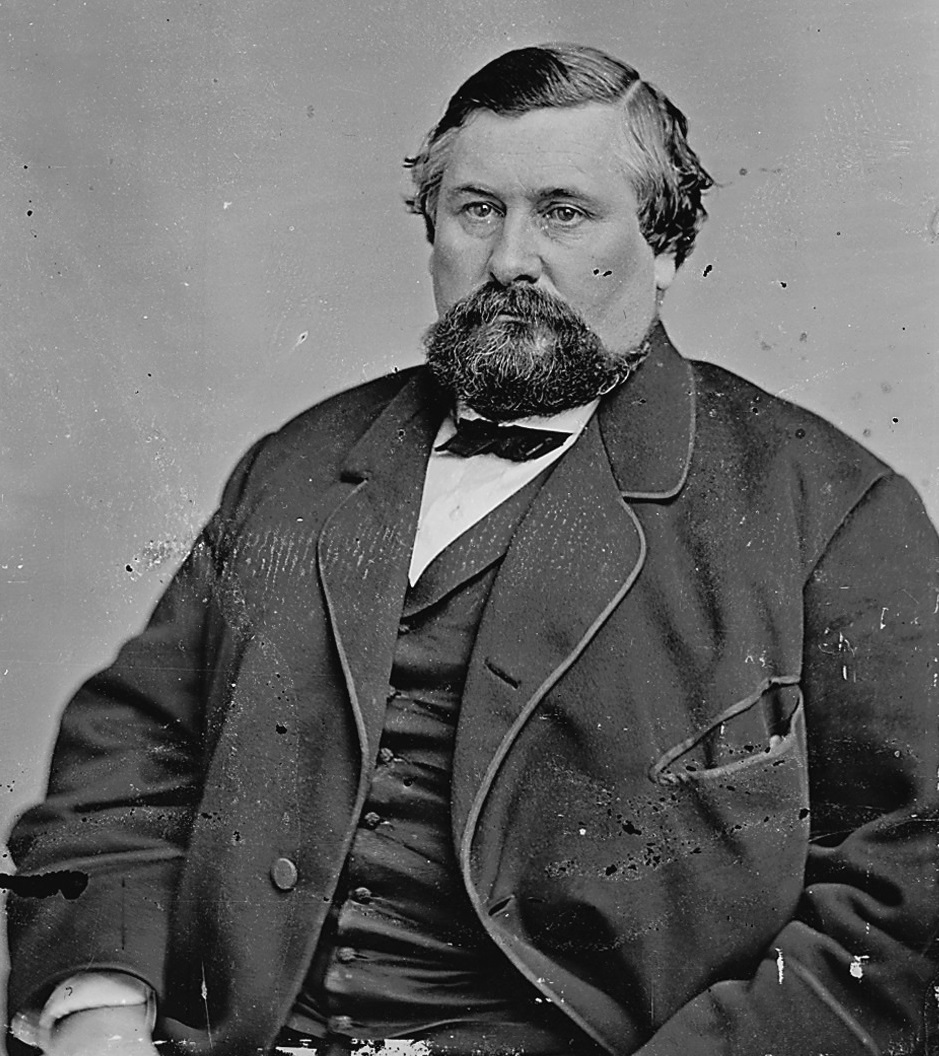
Samuel McLean, Montana's first territorial delegate

Congress	Delegate
38th (1863–1865)	Samuel McLean (D)
39th (1865–1867)	Samuel McLean (D)
40th (1867–1869)	James M. Cavanaugh (D)
41st (1869–1871)	James M. Cavanaugh (D)
42nd (1871–1873)	William H. Clagett
43rd (1873–1875)	Martin Maginnis (D)
44th (1875–1877)	Martin Maginnis (D)
45th (1877–1879)	Martin Maginnis (D)
46th (1879–1881)	Martin Maginnis (D)
47th (1881–1883)	Martin Maginnis (D)
48th (1883–1885)	Martin Maginnis (D)
49th (1885–1887)	Joseph Toole (D)
50th (1887–1889)	Joseph Toole (D)
51st (1889–1891)	Thomas H. Carter (R)

=== United States representatives ===
U.S. representatives are elected every two years by popular vote within a congressional district. Montana currently has two congressional districts. Every ten years, the number of congressional districts is reapportioned based on the state's population as determined by the United States census; Montana had had two districts from 1913 to 1993 and one at-large district from 1993 to 2023.

There have been 34 people, including just one woman, who have served as representatives from Montana: 15 Democrats, 20 Republicans and 1 Populist. Ryan Zinke and Matt Rosendale are the current officeholders.

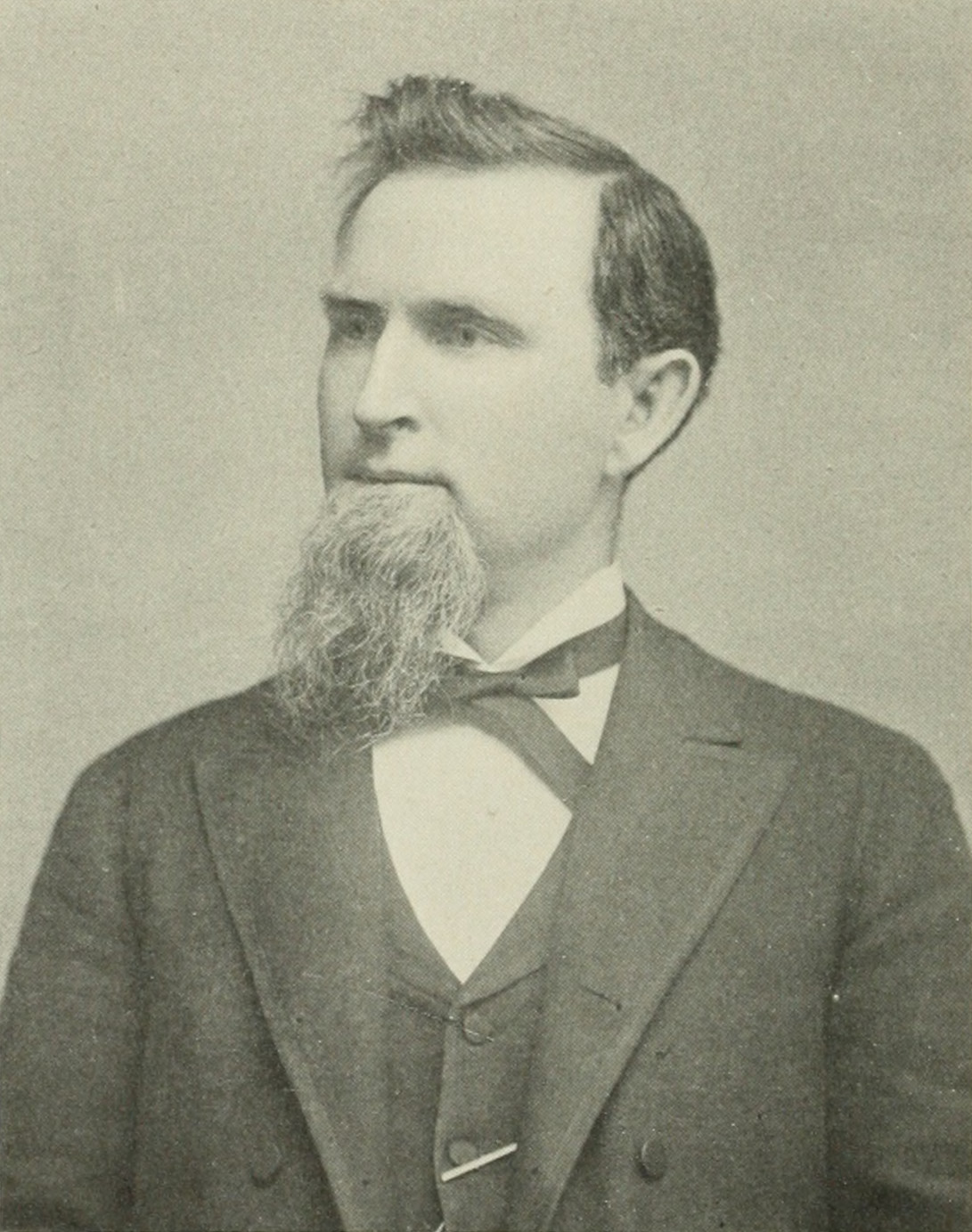
Thomas H. Carter, Montana's first representative from the State of Montana

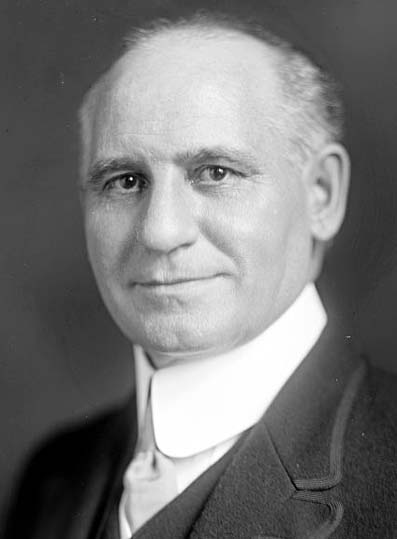
John M. Evans, Montana representative

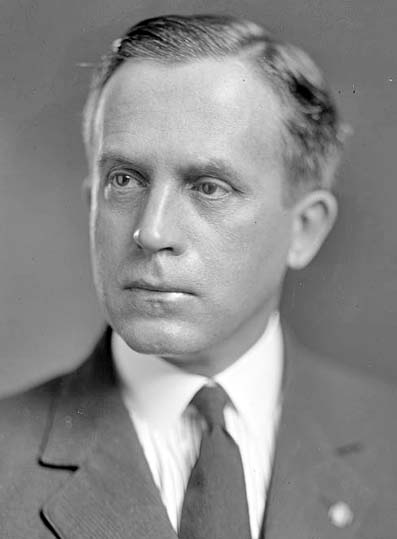
Scott Leavitt, Montana representative

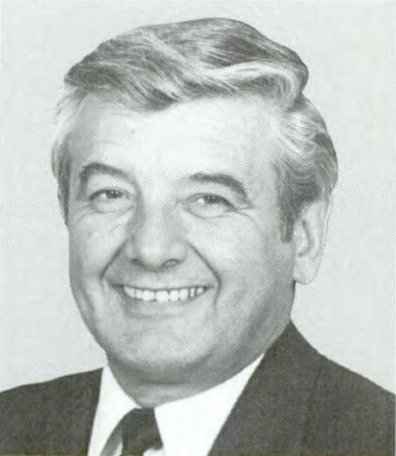
Ron Marlenee, Montana representative

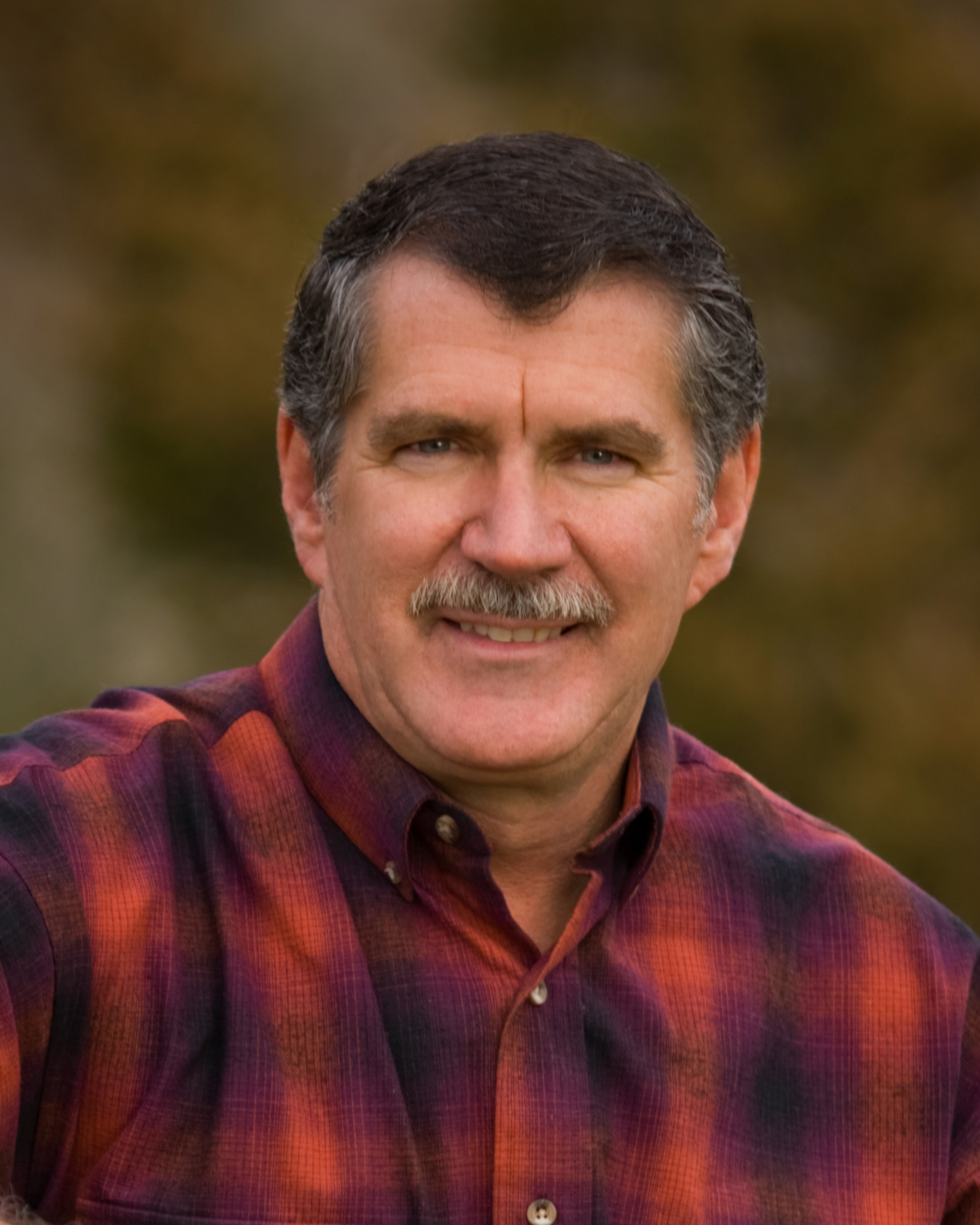
Denny Rehberg, Montana representative

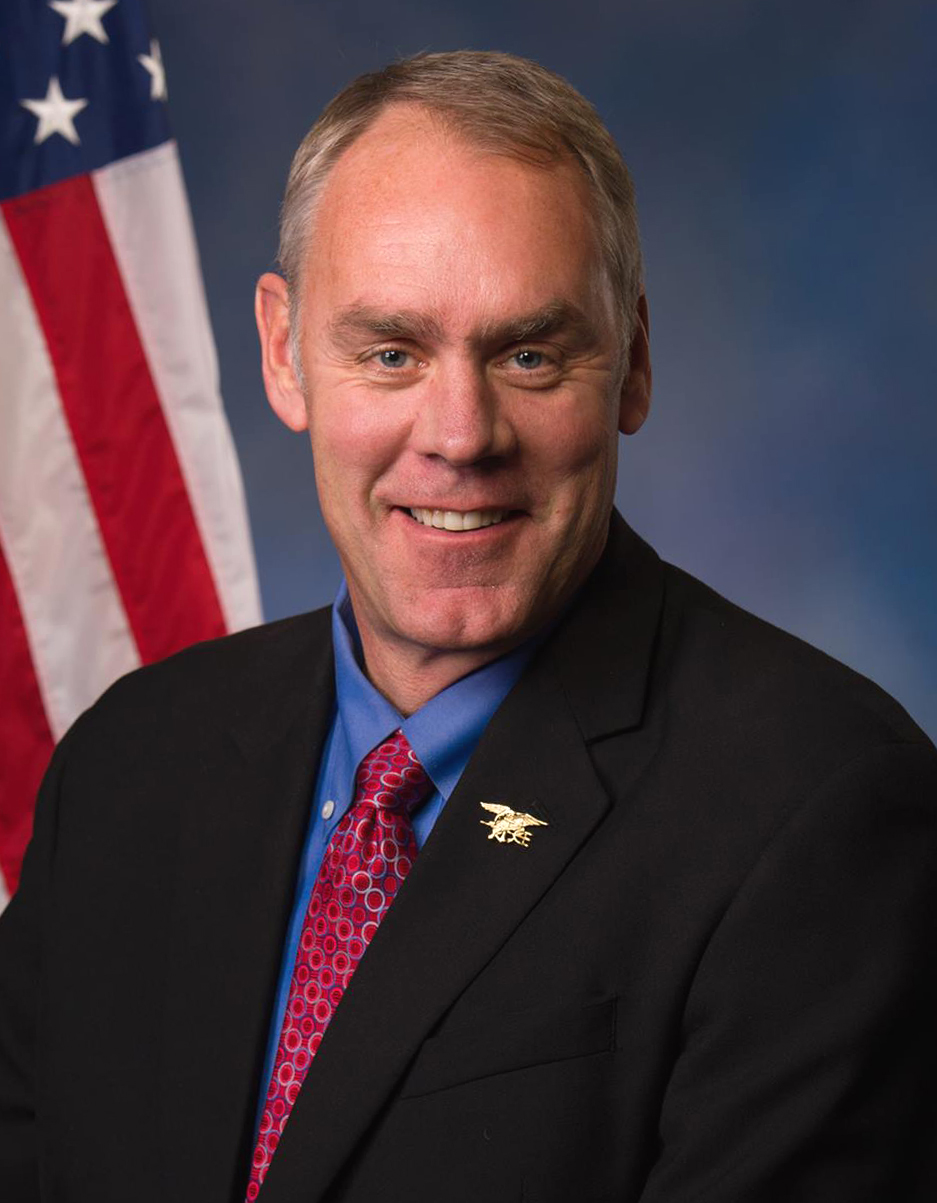
Ryan Zinke, Montana representative

Congress	At-large seats	
Congress	1st seat	2nd seat
51st (1889–1891)	Thomas H. Carter (R)	
52nd (1891–1893)	William W. Dixon (D)	
53rd (1893–1895)	Charles S. Hartman (R)	
54th (1895–1897)	Charles S. Hartman (R)	
55th (1897–1899)	Charles S. Hartman (R)	
56th (1899–1901)	Albert J. Campbell (D)	
57th (1901–1903)	Caldwell Edwards (Pop)	
58th (1903–1905)	Joseph M. Dixon (R)	
59th (1905–1907)	Joseph M. Dixon (R)	
60th (1907–1909)	Charles Nelson; Pray (R)	
61st (1909–1911)	Charles Nelson; Pray (R)	
62nd (1911–1913)	Charles Nelson; Pray (R)	
63rd (1913–1915)	John M. Evans (D)	Tom Stout (D)
64th (1915–1917)	John M. Evans (D)	Tom Stout (D)
65th (1917–1919)	John M. Evans (D)	Jeannette Rankin (R)
Congress	1st district	2nd district
66th (1919–1921)	John M. Evans (D)	Carl W. Riddick (R)
67th (1921–1923)	Washington J. McCormick (R)	Carl W. Riddick (R)
68th (1923–1925)	John M. Evans (D)	Scott Leavitt (R)
69th (1925–1927)	John M. Evans (D)	Scott Leavitt (R)
70th (1927–1929)	John M. Evans (D)	Scott Leavitt (R)
71st (1929–1931)	John M. Evans (D)	Scott Leavitt (R)
72nd (1931–1933)	John M. Evans (D)	Scott Leavitt (R)
73rd (1933–1935)	Joseph P. Monaghan (D)	Roy E. Ayers (D)
74th (1935–1937)	Joseph P. Monaghan (D)	Roy E. Ayers (D)
75th (1937–1939)	Jerry J. O'Connell (D)	James F. O'Connor (D)
76th (1939–1941)	Jacob Thorkelson (R)	James F. O'Connor (D)
77th (1941–1943)	Jeannette Rankin (R)	James F. O'Connor (D)
78th (1943–1945)	Mike Mansfield (D)	James F. O'Connor (D)
79th (1945–1947)	Mike Mansfield (D)	James F. O'Connor (D)
79th (1945–1947)	Mike Mansfield (D)	Wesley A. D'Ewart (R)
80th (1947–1949)	Mike Mansfield (D)	Wesley A. D'Ewart (R)
81st (1949–1951)	Mike Mansfield (D)	Wesley A. D'Ewart (R)
82nd (1951–1953)	Mike Mansfield (D)	Wesley A. D'Ewart (R)
83rd (1953–1955)	Lee Metcalf (D)	Wesley A. D'Ewart (R)
84th (1955–1957)	Lee Metcalf (D)	Orvin B. Fjare (R)
85th (1957–1959)	Lee Metcalf (D)	LeRoy H. Anderson (D)
86th (1959–1961)	Lee Metcalf (D)	LeRoy H. Anderson (D)
87th (1961–1963)	Arnold Olsen (D)	James F. Battin (R)
88th (1963–1965)	Arnold Olsen (D)	James F. Battin (R)
89th (1965–1967)	Arnold Olsen (D)	James F. Battin (R)
90th (1967–1969)	Arnold Olsen (D)	James F. Battin (R)
91st (1969–1971)	Arnold Olsen (D)	James F. Battin (R)
91st (1969–1971)	Arnold Olsen (D)	John Melcher (D)
92nd (1971–1973)	Richard G. Shoup (R)	John Melcher (D)
93rd (1973–1975)	Richard G. Shoup (R)	John Melcher (D)
94th (1975–1977)	Max Baucus (D)	John Melcher (D)
95th (1977–1979)	Max Baucus (D)	Ron Marlenee (R)
96th (1979–1981)	Pat Williams (D)	Ron Marlenee (R)
97th (1981–1983)	Pat Williams (D)	Ron Marlenee (R)
98th (1983–1985)	Pat Williams (D)	Ron Marlenee (R)
99th (1985–1987)	Pat Williams (D)	Ron Marlenee (R)
100th (1987–1989)	Pat Williams (D)	Ron Marlenee (R)
101st (1989–1991)	Pat Williams (D)	Ron Marlenee (R)
102nd (1991–1993)	Pat Williams (D)	Ron Marlenee (R)
Congress	At-large seat	
103rd (1993–1995)	Pat Williams (D)	
104th (1995–1997)	Pat Williams (D)	
105th (1997–1999)	Rick Hill (R)	
106th (1999–2001)	Rick Hill (R)	
107th (2001–2003)	Denny Rehberg (R)	
108th (2003–2005)	Denny Rehberg (R)	
109th (2005–2007)	Denny Rehberg (R)	
110th (2007–2009)	Denny Rehberg (R)	
111th (2009–2011)	Denny Rehberg (R)	
112th (2011–2013)	Denny Rehberg (R)	
113th (2013–2015)	Steve Daines (R)	
114th (2015–2017)	Ryan Zinke (R)	
115th (2017–2019)	Ryan Zinke (R)	
115th (2017–2019)	Greg Gianforte (R)	
116th (2019–2021)	Greg Gianforte (R)	
117th (2021–2023)	Matt Rosendale (R)	
Congress	1st district	2nd district
118th (2023–2025)	Ryan Zinke (R)	Matt Rosendale (R)
119th (2025–2027)	Ryan Zinke (R)	Troy Downing (R)
120th (2027–2029)	Sam Forstag (D)	Troy Downing (R)

== Key ==
Democratic (D)
Populist (Pop)
Republican (R)
Silver Republican (SvR)

== See also ==
- List of United States congressional districts
- Montana's congressional districts
- Political party strength in Montana
