= 1972 United States Senate election in Montana =

- November 7, 1972
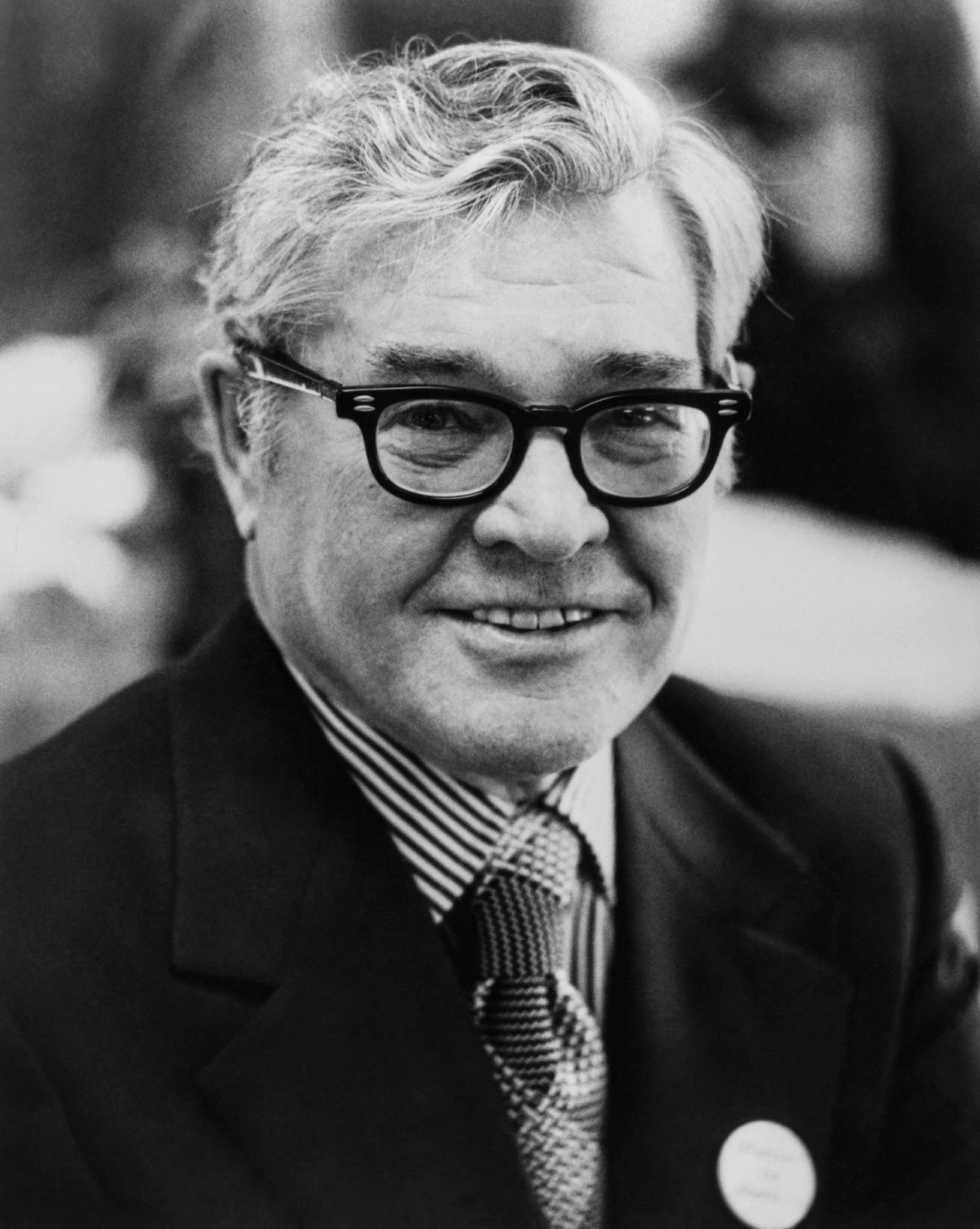

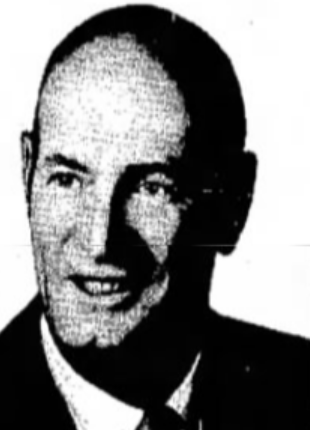
Nominee	Lee Metcalf	Hank Hibbard
Party	Democratic	Republican
Popular vote	163,609	151,316
Percentage	51.95%	48.05%
- County results Metcalf: 50–60% 60–70% 70–80% Hibbard: 50–60% 60–70% 70–80%
U.S. senator before election
Lee Metcalf
Democratic
Elected U.S. Senator
Lee Metcalf
Democratic

The 1972 United States Senate election in Montana took place on November 7, 1972. Incumbent United States Senator Lee Metcalf, who was first elected to the Senate in 1960 and was re-elected in 1966, ran for re-election. After winning the Democratic primary, he moved on to the general election, where he faced Hank Hibbard, a state senator and the Republican nominee. Following a close campaign, Metcalf managed to narrowly win re-election to his third term in the Senate over Hibbard. Montana was one of fifteen states, alongside Alabama, Arkansas, Colorado, Delaware, Georgia, Iowa, Louisiana, Maine, Minnesota, Mississippi, New Hampshire, Rhode Island, South Dakota and West Virginia, that were won by Republican President Richard Nixon in 1972 that elected Democrats to the United States Senate.

== Democratic primary ==
=== Candidates ===
- Lee Metcalf, incumbent United States senator
- Jerome Peters

=== Results ===
Democratic Party primary results
Party	Candidate	Votes	%
Democratic	Lee Metcalf (incumbent)	106,491	86.42%
Democratic	Jerome Peters	16,729	13.58%
Total votes		123,220	100.00%

== Republican primary ==
=== Candidates ===
- Hank Hibbard
- Merrill K. Riddick
- Harold E. Wallace, 1970 Republican nominee for the Senate
- Norman C. Wheeler

=== Results ===
Republican primary results
Party	Candidate	Votes	%
Republican	Hank Hibbard	43,028	49.70%
Republican	Harold E. Wallace	26,463	30.57%
Republican	Norman C. Wheeler	13,826	15.97%
Republican	Merrill K. Riddick	3,259	3.76%
Total votes		86,576	100.00%

== General election ==
=== Results ===
United States Senate election in Montana, 1972
Party	Candidate	Votes	%	±%
Democratic	Lee Metcalf (incumbent)	163,609	51.95%	−1.22%
Republican	Hank Hibbard	151,316	48.05%	+1.22%
Majority		12,293	3.90%	−2.43%
Turnout		314,925		
Democratic hold		Swing		

== See also ==
- United States Senate elections, 1972
