= Sumner Gerard =

American politician

Sumner Gerard MBE

United States Ambassador to Jamaica
- In office June 4, 1974 – April 15, 1977
- President: Richard Nixon; Gerald Ford; Jimmy Carter
- Preceded by: Vincent de Roulet
- Succeeded by: Frederick Irving

Montana Senate Minority Leader
- In office 1965–1966
- Preceded by: J. S. Brenner
- Succeeded by: Jean Turnage

Member of the Montana Senate from Madison County
- In office 1962–1966

Montana House Minority Leader
- In office 1959–1961
- Preceded by: Rudy Juedeman
- Succeeded by: James P. Lucas

Member of the Montana House of Representatives from Madison County
- In office 1955–1961

Personal details
- Born: July 15, 1916 Melville, New York, United States
- Died: February 24, 2005 (aged 88) Vero Beach, Florida, United States
- Party: Republican
- Spouse(s): Louise Grosvenor (m. 1945; div. 1966) Teresa Dabrowska (m. 1966; div. 2004)
- Parent(s): Sumner Gerard; Helen Coster
- Education: Trinity College, Cambridge (BA, MA)
- Awards: Order of the British Empire

Military service
- Allegiance: United States
- Branch/service: United States Army; United States Navy; United States Marine Corps
- Years of service: 1940–1945
- Rank: Captain
- Battles/wars: World War II
- Awards: Army Commendation Medal

Sumner Gerard Jr. MBE (July 15, 1916 – February 24, 2005) was an American businessman, politician, and diplomat. Born in New York to a prominent family, Gerard attended Groton School and Trinity College, Cambridge. After serving in the army, navy, and Marine Corps during World War II, he moved to Montana and became involved in business, including mining and ranching, and politics.

During the 1950s and 1960s, he was a member of both the Montana House of Representatives and the Montana Senate, serving as Republican minority leader in both. In 1974, President Richard Nixon appointed him United States Ambassador to Jamaica, a position he held through the administration of President Gerald Ford, leaving in 1977. He then moved to Florida, serving as an adjunct professor of marine archaeology at the University of Miami and sponsoring and participating in underwater archaeology expeditions. He died in 2005 in Vero Beach, Florida, aged 88.

== Early life and education ==
Gerard was born in Melville, New York, a hamlet in the Long Island town of Huntington. Born to Sumner Gerard and Helen Coster, he had two brothers.

His paternal ancestors, the Gerards, were French Huguenots who emigrated to New York in 1776 after several generations in Scotland. One of his ancestors from the maternal side of the Gerard family was Increase Sumner, Governor of Massachusetts and associate justice of the Massachusetts Supreme Judicial Court. James W. Gerard, the United States Ambassador to Germany during World War I, was his uncle. The family became prominent in business, law, and politics. Gerard Avenue in The Bronx is named for them. The Gerard family were members of the Episcopal Church.

Gerard graduated from the Groton School, a private boarding secondary school in Groton, Massachusetts. He attended Trinity College at the University of Cambridge, earning a Bachelor of Arts in 1937 and a Master of Arts in 1939.

== World War II service ==
During World War II, Gerard served in the United States Army, the Navy, and the Marine Corps. He started out as a buck private in the Army Air Corps, spent time as a parachutist, and ended his service four years later as an infantry captain of intelligence in the Marines. His service spanned such locations as the Middle East and North Africa, Washington, D.C., China, Burma, and California. In 1942, he flew with Winston Churchill to Moscow, Soviet Union, to meet Joseph Stalin. Gerard received the Army Commendation Medal and the Order of the British Empire.

== Career ==
=== Montana ===
After the war 1940s, Gerard became involved in his family's real estate business, the Aeon Realty Company, with interests in Manhattan, Long Island, and New Jersey. However, Gerard wished to move to the western United States. He began studying ranching, and in 1947 toured several western states, deciding on Montana. In 1948, he purchased what is now known as the Bar 7 Ranch in Ennis, Montana, moving there with his family in 1949. Gerard operated the ranch as both a home and a livestock operation, raising cattle and horses. He also owned another ranch in the town of Dillon. However, the ranch was never profitable, and Gerard received assistance from his father through monies and stocks in order to help him reduce with his significant debt.

Thanks to his father's financial assistance as well as that of a company owned by his family, Gerard was able to maintain a comfortable lifestyle, covering ranch expenses, educational expenses for his children, and costs of operating a private airplane. In addition to ranching, Gerard had business interests in Billings and Bozeman, and was a mining executive for Newmont Resources and a director of Cardinal Petroleum, both based in Billings.

=== Politics ===
Sometime after moving to Montana, Gerard became involved in state politics. In 1954, he was elected to the Montana Legislature as a Republican representing Madison County, with his term beginning in 1955. He was elected to three terms in the House, serving in his final term as minority leader from 1959 to 1961.

On December 17, 1959, Gerard announced his campaign for the Republican nomination for the United States Senate, and said:

[I am] convinced that Montana must look and think ahead, or we will forfeit our potential. I intend to file for nomination to the U.S. Senate with the hope that Montana will send new blood with a fresh outlook to Washington to best represent all Montanans."

However, Gerard lost the nomination in the Republican primary, finishing second in a six-way race, earning 27% of the vote, compared to 39% of votes for nominee Orvin B. Fjare. His father helped fund his campaign, which cost $20,000. One source writes that he may have lost in the primary "because Montanans did not believe him to be authentically Montanan."

In 1962, Gerard earned the Republican nomination for the Montana Senate from Madison County. He won the election, serving in the Senate from 1962 to 1966. He was elected minority leader, serving in that capacity from 1965 to 1966.

=== Diplomat ===
In 1969, Gerard left Montana to pursue a career as a diplomat, and relocated temporarily to New Jersey. In 1969, the Nixon administration sent him to Rome, Italy, as a delegate to the Food and Agriculture Organization of the United Nations. In 1970, he was named mission director for the United States Agency for International Development (USAID) in Tunisia, a position he held until 1974. On March 22, 1974, President Richard Nixon appointed him United States Ambassador to Jamaica, and he presented credentials on June 4, 1974. He served as ambassador through the presidency of Gerald Ford and the beginning of the Carter administration, leaving the position in 1977.

=== Later career ===
After leaving his ambassadorship, Gerard relocated to Florida from New Jersey. He was an active benefactor of marine biology and a frequent sponsor of underwater archaeological expeditions and in 1977 became an adjunct professor of maritime archaeology at the University of Miami.

== Personal life ==
Gerard was married twice: first in 1944 to Louise Taft Grosvenor, a daughter of Thelma Cudlipp and granddaughter of Edwin A. Grosvenor, before divorcing in 1966, and next to Teresa Dabrowska, a native of Warsaw, Poland, whom he married in the 1960s and divorced in 2004. He had five children with his first wife: Jenny, Molly, Helen, Anne, and Sumner.

Gerard died of natural causes in a hospital in Vero Beach, Florida, on February 24, 2005. A memorial service was held at the Smithsonian Marine Station in Fort Pierce, Florida, on March 1, before an afternoon funeral service at St. Thomas Episcopal Church in Manhattan on March 3.

== See also ==
- United States Senate election in Montana, 1960
