= 2024 United States House of Representatives elections in Montana =

- November 5, 2024

Both Montana seats to the United States House of Representatives
	Majority party	Minority party
Party	Republican	Democratic
Last election	2	0
Seats won	2	0
Seat change	Steady	Steady
Popular vote	350,361	237,496
Percentage	58.50%	39.65%
Swing	▲5.64%	▲5.41%

Republican:
40–50%
50–60%
60–70%
70–80%
80–90%
90–100%
Democratic:
50–60%
60–70%

The 2024 United States House of Representatives elections in Montana were held on November 5, 2024, to elect the two U.S. representatives from the state of Montana, one from each of the state's congressional districts. The elections coincided with the U.S. presidential election, other elections to the House of Representatives, elections to the United States Senate, and various state and local elections. The primary elections took place on June 4, 2024.

== Overview ==
=== Statewide ===
Party	Candi- dates	Votes		Seats		
Party	Candi- dates	No.	%	No.	+/–	%
Republican Party	2	350,361	58.50%	2	Steady	100%
Democratic Party	2	237,496	39.65%	0	Steady	0%
Libertarian Party	1	9,954	1.66%	0	Steady	0%
Write-ins	2	1,107	0.18%	0	Steady	0%
Total	5	598,918	100%	2	Steady	100%

=== District ===
District	Republican		Democratic		Others		Total		Result
District	Votes	%	Votes	%	Votes	%	Votes	%	Result
District 1	168,529	52.29%	143,783	44.62%	9,954	3.09%	322,266	100.00%	Republican hold
District 2	181,832	65.73%	93,713	33.87%	1,107	0.40%	276,652	100.00%	Republican hold
Total	350,361	58.50%	237,496	39.65%	11,061	1.85%	598,918	100.00%	

Popular vote
Republican	58.50%
Democratic	39.65%
Other	1.85%

House seats
Republican	100.00%

=== County ===
County	Republican		Democratic		Others		Margin		Total
County	#	%	#	%	#	%	#	%	Total
Beaverhead	3,987	68.65%	1,642	28.27%	179	3.08%	2,345	40.38%	5,808
Big Horn	2,115	47.83%	2,305	52.13%	2	0.05%	-190	-4.30%	4,422
Blaine	1,491	49.92%	1,414	47.34%	82	2.75%	77	2.58%	2,987
Broadwater	3,833	81.14%	886	18.76%	5	0.11%	2,947	62.38%	4,724
Carbon	4,919	67.86%	2,314	31.92%	16	0.22%	2,605	35.94%	7,249
Carter	774	92.25%	65	7.75%	0	0.00%	709	84.51%	839
Cascade	23,122	62.53%	13,725	37.12%	131	0.35%	9,397	25.41%	36,978
Chouteau	1,963	68.33%	909	31.64%	1	0.03%	1,054	36.69%	2,873
Custer	4,293	75.34%	1,374	24.11%	31	0.54%	2,919	51.23%	5,698
Daniels	780	83.87%	150	16.13%	0	0.00%	630	67.74%	930
Dawson	3,628	80.09%	860	18.98%	42	0.93%	2,768	61.10%	4,530
Deer Lodge	2,092	42.88%	2,590	53.08%	197	4.04%	-498	-10.21%	4,879
Fallon	1,299	89.03%	156	10.69%	4	0.27%	1,143	78.34%	1,459
Fergus	5,132	77.37%	1,482	22.34%	19	0.29%	3,650	55.03%	6,633
Flathead	40,681	64.32%	20,801	32.89%	1,764	2.79%	19,880	31.43%	63,246
Gallatin	31,673	45.35%	36,178	51.81%	1,983	2.84%	-4,505	-6.45%	69,834
Garfield	737	95.59%	33	4.28%	1	0.13%	704	91.31%	771
Glacier	1,779	34.91%	3,131	61.44%	186	3.65%	-1,352	-26.53%	5,096
Golden Valley	448	86.49%	70	13.51%	0	0.00%	378	72.97%	518
Granite	1,463	67.17%	630	28.93%	85	3.90%	833	38.25%	2,178
Hill	3,904	58.57%	2,719	40.79%	43	0.65%	1,185	17.78%	6,666
Jefferson	5,685	69.19%	2,506	30.50%	26	0.32%	3,179	38.69%	8,217
Judith Basin	1,091	81.12%	248	18.44%	6	0.45%	843	62.68%	1,345
Lake	9,520	56.18%	6,909	40.77%	517	3.05%	2,611	15.41%	16,946
Lewis and Clark	22,256	53.81%	18,845	45.56%	258	0.62%	3,411	8.25%	41,359
Liberty	767	78.67%	207	21.23%	1	0.10%	560	57.44%	975
Lincoln	8,534	72.63%	2,756	23.46%	460	3.91%	5,778	49.17%	11,750
Madison	4,508	69.74%	1,751	27.09%	205	3.17%	2,757	42.65%	6,464
McCone	928	87.14%	132	12.39%	5	0.47%	796	74.74%	1,065
Meagher	922	79.41%	239	20.59%	0	0.00%	683	58.83%	1,161
Mineral	1,950	68.81%	748	26.39%	136	4.80%	1,202	42.41%	2,834
Missoula	26,195	35.95%	44,611	61.22%	2,066	2.84%	-18,416	-25.27%	72,872
Musselshell	2,574	86.90%	388	13.10%	0	0.00%	2,186	73.80%	2,962
Park	6,230	54.07%	5,255	45.60%	38	0.33%	975	8.46%	11,523
Petroleum	289	88.92%	36	11.08%	0	0.00%	253	77.85%	325
Phillips	1,797	83.04%	364	16.82%	3	0.14%	1,433	66.22%	2,164
Pondera	1,996	71.16%	780	27.81%	29	1.03%	1,216	43.35%	2,805
Powder River	959	88.31%	127	11.69%	0	0.00%	832	76.61%	1,086
Powell	2,371	72.35%	757	23.10%	149	4.55%	1,614	49.25%	3,277
Prairie	560	83.21%	113	16.79%	0	0.00%	447	66.42%	673
Ravalli	19,972	66.78%	9,062	30.30%	873	2.92%	10,910	36.48%	29,907
Richland	4,372	84.76%	782	15.16%	4	0.08%	3,590	69.60%	5,158
Roosevelt	1,980	51.48%	1,864	48.47%	2	0.05%	116	3.02%	3,846
Rosebud	2,484	67.96%	1,163	31.82%	8	0.22%	1,321	36.14%	3,655
Sanders	5,886	73.04%	1,854	23.01%	319	3.96%	4,032	50.03%	8,059
Sheridan	1,340	73.34%	481	26.33%	6	0.33%	859	47.02%	1,827
Silver Bow	7,395	40.50%	10,057	55.08%	806	4.41%	-2,662	-14.58%	18,258
Stillwater	4,804	82.18%	1,042	17.82%	0	0.00%	3,762	64.35%	5,846
Sweet Grass	1,833	77.80%	521	22.11%	2	0.08%	1,312	55.69%	2,356
Teton	2,592	73.51%	923	26.18%	11	0.31%	1,669	47.33%	3,526
Toole	1,601	79.65%	406	20.20%	3	0.15%	1,195	59.45%	2,010
Treasure	381	86.59%	59	13.41%	0	0.00%	322	73.18%	440
Valley	3,030	75.92%	951	23.83%	10	0.25%	2,079	52.09%	3,991
Wheatland	873	81.21%	196	18.23%	6	0.56%	677	62.98%	1,075
Wibaux	459	86.28%	70	13.16%	3	0.56%	389	73.12%	532
Yellowstone	52,114	64.89%	27,859	34.69%	338	0.42%	24,255	30.20%	80,311
Totals	350,361	58.50%	237,496	39.65%	11,061	1.85%	112,865	18.84%	598,918

== District 1 ==
2024 Montana's 1st congressional district election
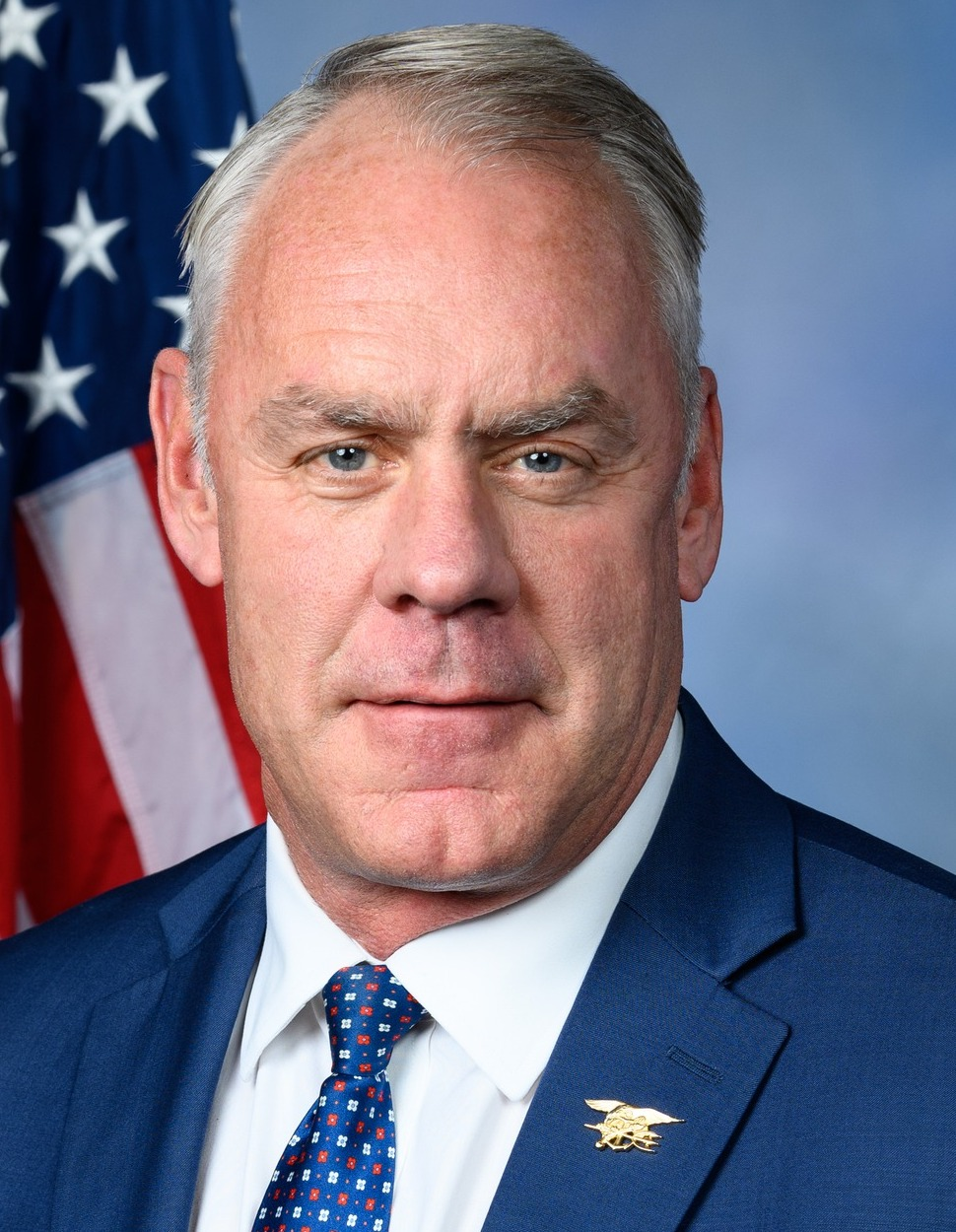

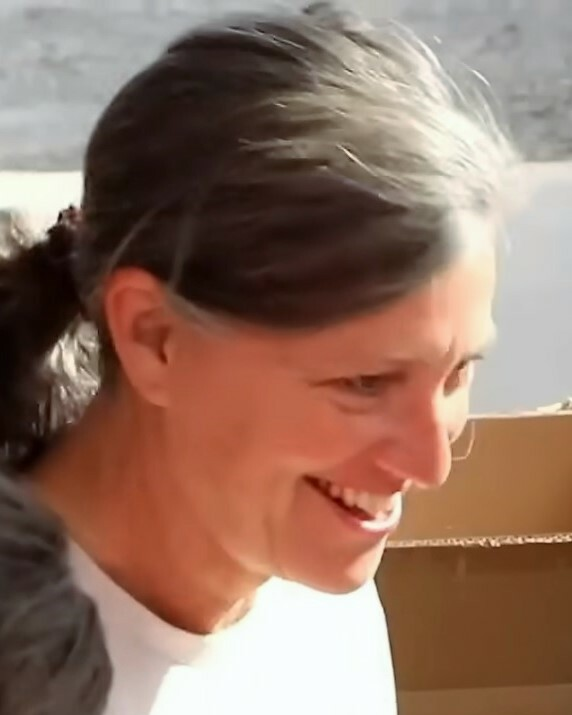
Nominee	Ryan Zinke	Monica Tranel
Party	Republican	Democratic
Popular vote	168,529	143,783
Percentage	52.29%	44.62%
- Zinke: 40–50% 50–60% 60–70% 70–80% 80–90% >90% Tranel: 40–50% 50–60% 60–70% 70–80% 80–90% No votes
U.S. Representative before election
Ryan Zinke
Republican
Elected U.S. Representative
Ryan Zinke
Republican

The 1st district is based in mountainous Western Montana, including the cities of Missoula, Kalispell, Bozeman and Butte. The incumbent was Republican Ryan Zinke, who was elected with 49.7% of the vote in 2022. He initially had expressed interest in running for U.S. Senate against incumbent Jon Tester, but chose not to do so.

=== Republican primary ===
==== Nominee ====
- Ryan Zinke, incumbent U.S. representative

==== Eliminated in primary ====
- Mary Todd, innkeeper and candidate for this district in 2022

==== Endorsements ====
Ryan Zinke

Executive branch officials

- John Bolton, U.S. national security advisor (2018–2019), United States ambassador to the United Nations (2005–2006)
- Donald Trump, 45th president of the United States

Organizations

- AIPAC
- National Rifle Association Political Victory Fund

==== Fundraising ====
Campaign finance reports as of May 15, 2024
Candidate	Raised	Spent	Cash on hand
Mary Todd (R)	$87,253 (Note: $76,300 of this total was self-funded by Todd.)	$67,177	$20,075
Ryan Zinke (R)	$5,752,008	$3,341,562	$2,520,494
Source: Federal Election Commission

==== Results ====
Republican primary results
Party	Candidate	Votes	%
Republican	Ryan Zinke (incumbent)	66,409	73.74%
Republican	Mary Todd	23,647	26.26%
Total votes		90,056	100.00%

=== Democratic primary ===
==== Nominee ====
- Monica Tranel, lawyer, former Olympic rower, and nominee for this district in 2022

==== Endorsements ====
Monica Tranel

U.S. representatives

- Lois Frankel, U.S. representative from Florida's 22nd congressional district (2013–present)
- Annie Kuster, U.S. representative for New Hampshire's 2nd congressional district (2013–2025)
- Pat Ryan, U.S. representative for New York's 18th congressional district (2023–present)

Statewide officials

- Brian Schweitzer, former governor of Montana (2005–2013)
- Gretchen Whitmer, governor of Michigan (2019–present)

State legislators

- Dave Fern, state representative from the 5th district (2017–present)
- Shannon O'Brien, state senator from the 46th district (2021–present)

Organizations

- DCCC Red to Blue
- Democratic Majority for Israel
- EMILY's List
- Jewish Democratic Council of America
- League of Conservation Voters
- National Committee to Preserve Social Security and Medicare(Post-primary)
- National Organization for Women PAC
- NewDem Action Fund
- Planned Parenthood Action Fund
- Reproductive Freedom for All

Labor unions

- National Education Association

==== Fundraising ====
Campaign finance reports as of May 15, 2024
Candidate	Raised	Spent	Cash on hand
Monica Tranel (D)	$2,340,724	$826,277	$1,524,332
Source: Federal Election Commission

==== Results ====
Democratic primary results
Party	Candidate	Votes	%
Democratic	Monica Tranel	59,806	100.00%
Total votes		59,806	100.00%

=== Libertarian primary ===
==== Nominee ====
- Dennis Hayes, remodeling contractor

==== Eliminated in primary ====
- Ernie Noble, construction worker

==== Results ====
Libertarian primary results
Party	Candidate	Votes	%
Libertarian	Dennis Hayes	390	65.44%
Libertarian	Ernie Noble	206	34.56%
Total votes		596	100.00%

=== General election ===
==== Predictions ====
Source	Ranking	As of
The Cook Political Report	Lean R	October 4, 2024
Inside Elections	Lean R	September 15, 2023
Sabato's Crystal Ball	Lean R	February 23, 2023
Elections Daily	Lean R	September 7, 2023
CNalysis	Lean R	November 16, 2023

==== Polling ====
Poll source	Date(s) administered	Sample size (Note: Key: A – all adults RV – registered voters LV – likely voters V – unclear)	Margin of error	Ryan Zinke (R)	Monica Tranel (D)	Dennis Hayes (L)	Undecided
Impact Research (D) (Note: Poll sponsored by Tranel's campaign)	October 14–17, 2024	500 (LV)	± 4.4%	46%	45%	4%	5%
Guidance Polling and Strategy (Note: Poll sponsored by the Congressional Leadership Fund)	October 13–16, 2024	400 (LV)	± 4.9%	52%	44%	–	4%
Montana State University	September 30 – October 16, 2024	(A)	–	44%	37%	4%	15%
Noble Predictive Insights (Note: Poll sponsored by Inside Elections)	September 11–14, 2024	432 (LV)	± 4.7%	49%	44%	–	7%
Noble Predictive Insights	September 11–14, 2024	432 (LV)	± 4.7%	47%	43%	3%	7%
DCCC (D)	September 11–13, 2024	864 (LV)	± 3.3%	46%	45%	–	9% (Note: "Undecided" with 4%)
Impact Research (D)	August 26–29, 2024	500 (LV)	± 4.4%	46%	44%	4%	5%
Fabrizio Ward (R)/ David Binder Research (D) (Note: Poll sponsored by AARP)	August 25–29, 2024	310 (LV)	–	49%	43%	–	8%
Impact Research (D)	May 2024	–	–	46%	42%	6%	6%
Impact Research (D)	February 2024	–	–	52%	43%	0%	5%

==== Results ====
2024 Montana's 1st congressional district election
Party	Candidate	Votes	%
Republican	Ryan Zinke (incumbent)	168,529	52.29%
Democratic	Monica Tranel	143,783	44.62%
Libertarian	Dennis Hayes	9,954	3.09%
Total votes		322,266	100.00%
Republican hold			

==== By county ====
County	Ryan Zinke Republican		Monica Tranel Democratic		Dennis Hayes Libertarian		Margin		Total
County	#	%	#	%	#	%	#	%	Total
Beaverhead	3,987	68.65%	1,642	28.27%	179	3.08%	2,345	40.38%	5,808
Deer Lodge	2,092	42.88%	2,590	53.08%	197	4.04%	-498	-10.21%	4,879
Flathead	40,681	64.32%	20,801	32.89%	1,764	2.79%	19,880	31.43%	63,246
Gallatin	31,673	45.35%	36,178	51.81%	1,983	2.84%	-4,505	-6.45%	69,834
Glacier	1,779	34.91%	3,131	61.44%	186	3.65%	-1,352	-26.53%	5,096
Granite	1,463	67.17%	630	28.93%	85	3.90%	833	38.25%	2,178
Lake	9,520	56.18%	6,909	40.77%	517	3.05%	2,611	15.41%	16,946
Lincoln	8,534	72.63%	2,756	23.46%	460	3.91%	5,778	49.17%	11,750
Madison	4,508	69.74%	1,751	27.09%	205	3.17%	2,757	42.65%	6,464
Mineral	1,950	68.81%	748	26.39%	136	4.80%	1,202	42.41%	2,834
Missoula	26,195	35.95%	44,611	61.22%	2,066	2.84%	-18,416	-25.27%	72,872
Pondera (part)	523	60.96%	306	35.66%	29	3.38%	217	25.29%	858
Powell	2,371	72.35%	757	23.10%	149	4.55%	1,614	49.25%	3,277
Ravalli	19,972	66.78%	9,062	30.30%	873	2.92%	10,910	36.48%	29,907
Sanders	5,886	73.04%	1,854	23.01%	319	3.96%	4,032	50.03%	8,059
Silver Bow	7,395	40.50%	10,057	55.08%	806	4.41%	-2,662	-14.58%	18,258
Totals	168,529	52.29%	143,783	44.62%	9,954	3.09%	24,746	7.68%	322,266

== District 2 ==
2024 Montana's 2nd congressional district election
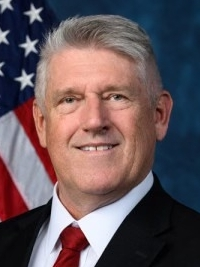

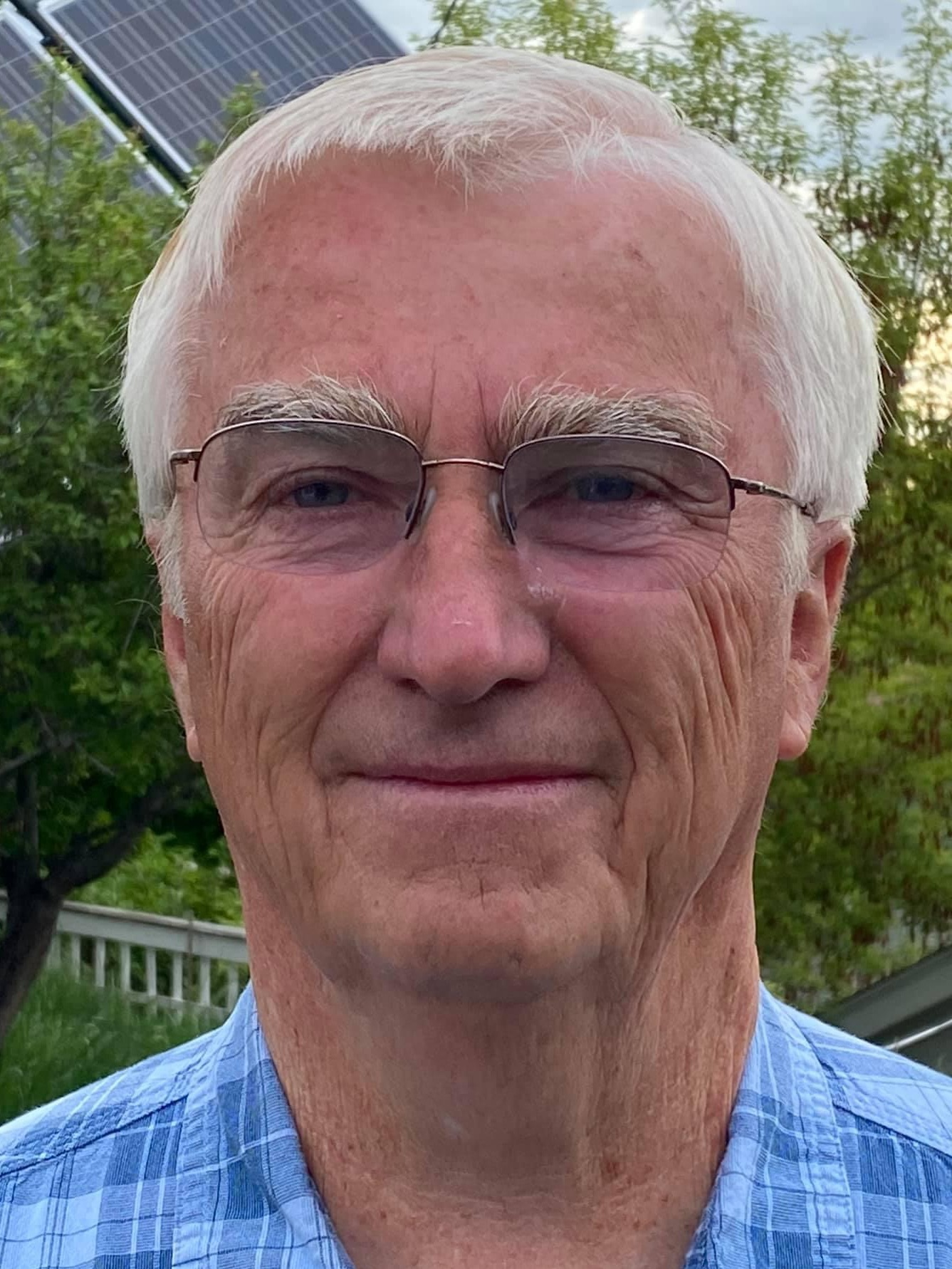
Nominee	Troy Downing	John Driscoll
Party	Republican	Democratic
Popular vote	181,832	93,713
Percentage	65.73%	33.87%
- Downing: 40–50% 50–60% 60–70% 70–80% 80–90% >90% Driscoll: 50–60% 60–70% 70–80% 80–90% >90%
U.S. Representative before election
Matt Rosendale
Republican
Elected U.S. Representative
Troy Downing
Republican

The 2nd district encompasses much of the state east of the Continental Divide, including the cities of Billings, Great Falls and Helena. The incumbent was Republican Matt Rosendale, who was re-elected with 56.6% of the vote in 2022. He announced in February 2024 that he would run for U.S. Senate against incumbent Jon Tester, but dropped out of the race one week later. On March 8, 2024, Rosendale announced that he would not be seeking any office in 2024.

=== Republican primary ===
==== Nominee ====
- Troy Downing, Montana state auditor (2021–2025) and candidate for U.S. Senate in 2018

==== Eliminated in primary ====
- Elsie Arntzen, Montana superintendent of public instruction (2017–2025) and candidate for the at-large district in 2014
- Kyle Austin, pharmacist and candidate for this district in 2022
- Kenneth Bogner, president pro tempore of the Montana Senate (2023–present) from the 19th district (2019–present) and candidate for lieutenant governor in 2020
- Ric Holden, former state senator from the 1st district (1995–2003)
- Joel Krautter, former state representative from the 35th district (2019–2021)
- Denny Rehberg, former U.S. representative from the at-large district (2001–2013), former lieutenant governor of Montana (1991–1997), and nominee for U.S. Senate in 1996 and 2012
- Stacy Zinn, retired DEA agent

==== Withdrawn ====
- Matt Rosendale, incumbent U.S. representative
- Ed Walker, former state senator from the 29th district (2011–2015) and candidate for the at-large district in 2017 (remained on ballot)

==== Endorsements ====
Elsie Arntzen

U.S. representatives

- Bob Good, chair of the Freedom Caucus (2024) and VA-05 (2021–2025)
- Harriet Hageman, WY-AL (2023–present)

Organizations

- House Freedom Fund
Ken Bogner

Executive branch officials

- Thomas Homan, acting director of the U.S. Immigration and Customs Enforcement (2017–2018)
Joel Krautter

Labor unions

- Montana Federation of Public Employees
- National Education Association
Declined to endorse

U.S. representatives

- Matt Rosendale, MT-02 (2021–2025)

==== Fundraising ====
Campaign finance reports as of May 15, 2024
Candidate	Raised	Spent	Cash on hand
Elsie Arntzen (R)	$871,444 (Note: $750,000 of this total was self-funded by Arntzen.)	$805,097	$66,347
Kenneth Bogner (R)	$54,359	$43,425	$10,933
Troy Downing (R)	$1,818,816 (Note: $1,050,000 of this total was self-funded by Downing.)	$1,383,494	$435,322
Ric Holden (R)	$49,248 (Note: $32,072 of this total was self-funded by Holden.)	$46,540	$2,708
Joel Krautter (R)	$76,533 (Note: $6,240 of this total was self-funded by Krautter.)	$67,136	$9,397
Denny Rehberg (R)	$601,991 (Note: $450,000 of this total was self-funded by Rehberg.)	$453,928	$148,063
Stacy Zinn (R)	$41,460	$3,091	$38,369
Source: Federal Election Commission

==== Polling ====
Poll source	Date(s) administered	Sample size	Margin of error	Elsie Arntzen	Kenneth Bogner	Troy Downing	Ric Holden	Denny Rehberg	Stacy Zinn	Other	Undecided
Cygnal (R) (Note: Poll sponsored by Elect Principled Veterans Fund, which supports Downing's campaign)	May 8–9, 2024	410 (LV)	± 4.8%	5%	4%	28%	2%	12%	8%	3% (Note: Joel Krautter with 2%; Kyle Austin with 1%; Ed Walker with 0%)	40%
Guidant Polling & Strategy (Note: Poll sponsored by Downing's campaign)	April 14–17, 2024	400 (LV)	± 4.9%	10%	–	38%	–	26%	–	–	27%
Cygnal (R)	April 15–16, 2024	415 (LV)	± 4.8%	7%	4%	21%	1%	11%	3%	3% (Note: Joel Krautter with 2%; Kyle Austin with 1; Ed Walker with 0%)	51%
Moore Information (Note: Poll sponsored by supporters of Rehberg's campaign)	February 1, 2024	500 (LV)	–	5%	3%	16%	2%	26%	2%	9% (Note: Joel Krautter and Ed Walker with 1%; "Other" with 7%)	37%

==== Results ====
Results by county: Downing: 20–30%; 30–40%; 40–50%; Rehberg: 20–30%; Bogner: 20–30%; 30–40%; 40–50%; 50–60%; Holden: 20–30%; 30–40%

Republican primary results
Party	Candidate	Votes	%
Republican	Troy Downing	36,269	36.12%
Republican	Denny Rehberg	17,182	17.11%
Republican	Stacy Zinn	13,581	13.53%
Republican	Elsie Arntzen	9,468	9.43%
Republican	Kenneth Bogner	9,026	8.99%
Republican	Ric Holden	7,108	7.08%
Republican	Joel Krautter	3,432	3.42%
Republican	Kyle Austin	3,177	3.16%
Republican	Ed Walker (withdrawn)	1,168	1.16%
Total votes		100,411	100.0

=== Democratic primary ===
==== Nominee ====
- John Driscoll, former public service commissioner and nominee for Montana's at-large congressional district in 2008

==== Eliminated in primary ====
- Ming Cabrera, salesman
- Kevin Hamm, IT consultant
- Steve Held, actor and rancher

==== Fundraising ====
Campaign finance reports as of May 15, 2024
Candidate	Raised	Spent	Cash on hand
Ming Cabrera (D)	$60,007 (Note: $2,740 of this total was self-funded by Cabrera.)	$41,424	$18,582
Kevin Hamm (D)	$62,689	$57,628	$5,061
Steve Held (D)	$86,570 (Note: $45,000 of this total was self-funded by Held.)	$67,945	$18,624
Source: Federal Election Commission

==== Results ====
Results by county: Driscoll: 30–40%; 40–50%; 50–60%; 60–70%; Held: 30–40%; 40–50%; 50–60%; Cabrera: 30–40%

Democratic primary results
Party	Candidate	Votes	%
Democratic	John Driscoll	13,420	33.31%
Democratic	Steve Held	10,649	26.43%
Democratic	Ming Cabrera	8,408	20.87%
Democratic	Kevin Hamm	7,813	19.39%
Total votes		40,290	100.00%

=== General election ===
==== Predictions ====
Source	Ranking	As of
The Cook Political Report	Solid R	February 2, 2023
Inside Elections	Solid R	September 15, 2023
Sabato's Crystal Ball	Safe R	February 23, 2023
Elections Daily	Safe R	September 7, 2023
CNalysis	Solid R	November 16, 2023

==== Polling ====
Poll source	Date(s) administered	Sample size	Margin of error	Troy Downing (R)	John Driscoll (D)	Other / Undecided
Montana State University	September 30 – October 16, 2024	(A)	–	43%	26%	31% (Note: Metzger (I) with 4%; Neill (D) with 3%)
Fabrizio Ward (R)/ David Binder Research (D) (Note: Poll sponsored by AARP.)	August 25–29, 2024	290 (LV)	–	52%	31%	17%

==== Results ====
2024 Montana's 2nd congressional district election
Party	Candidate	Votes	%
Republican	Troy Downing	181,832	65.73%
Democratic	John Driscoll	93,713	33.87%
Write-in		1,107	0.40%
Total votes		276,652	100.00%
Republican hold			

==== By county ====
County	Troy Downing Republican		John Driscoll Democratic		Write-in Various		Margin		Total
County	#	%	#	%	#	%	#	%	Total
Big Horn	2,115	47.83%	2,305	52.13%	2	0.05%	-190	-4.30%	4,422
Blaine	1,491	49.92%	1,414	47.34%	82	2.75%	77	2.58%	2,987
Broadwater	3,833	81.14%	886	18.76%	5	0.11%	2,947	62.38%	4,724
Carbon	4,919	67.86%	2,314	31.92%	16	0.22%	2,605	35.94%	7,249
Carter	774	92.25%	65	7.75%	0	0.00%	709	84.51%	839
Cascade	23,122	62.53%	13,725	37.12%	131	0.35%	9,397	25.41%	36,978
Chouteau	1,963	68.33%	909	31.64%	1	0.03%	1,054	36.69%	2,873
Custer	4,293	75.34%	1,374	24.11%	31	0.54%	2,919	51.23%	5,698
Daniels	780	83.87%	150	16.13%	0	0.00%	630	67.74%	930
Dawson	3,628	80.09%	860	18.98%	42	0.93%	2,768	61.10%	4,530
Fallon	1,299	89.03%	156	10.69%	4	0.27%	1,143	78.34%	1,459
Fergus	5,132	77.37%	1,482	22.34%	19	0.29%	3,650	55.03%	6,633
Garfield	737	95.59%	33	4.28%	1	0.13%	704	91.31%	771
Golden Valley	448	86.49%	70	13.51%	0	0.00%	378	72.97%	518
Hill	3,904	58.57%	2,719	40.79%	43	0.65%	1,185	17.78%	6,666
Jefferson	5,685	69.19%	2,506	30.50%	26	0.32%	3,179	38.69%	8,217
Judith Basin	1,091	81.12%	248	18.44%	6	0.45%	843	62.68%	1,345
Lewis and Clark	22,256	53.81%	18,845	45.56%	258	0.62%	3,411	8.25%	41,359
Liberty	767	78.67%	207	21.23%	1	0.10%	560	57.44%	975
McCone	928	87.14%	132	12.39%	5	0.47%	796	74.74%	1,065
Meagher	922	79.41%	239	20.59%	0	0.00%	683	58.83%	1,161
Musselshell	2,574	86.90%	388	13.10%	0	0.00%	2,186	73.80%	2,962
Park	6,230	54.07%	5,255	45.60%	38	0.33%	975	8.46%	11,523
Petroleum	289	88.92%	36	11.08%	0	0.00%	253	77.85%	325
Phillips	1,797	83.04%	364	16.82%	3	0.14%	1,433	66.22%	2,164
Pondera (part)	1,473	75.65%	474	24.35%	0	0.00%	999	51.31%	1,947
Powder River	959	88.31%	127	11.69%	0	0.00%	832	76.61%	1,086
Prairie	560	83.21%	113	16.79%	0	0.00%	447	66.42%	673
Richland	4,372	84.76%	782	15.16%	4	0.08%	3,590	69.60%	5,158
Roosevelt	1,980	51.48%	1,864	48.47%	2	0.05%	116	3.02%	3,846
Rosebud	2,484	67.96%	1,163	31.82%	8	0.22%	1,321	36.14%	3,655
Sheridan	1,340	73.34%	481	26.33%	6	0.33%	859	47.02%	1,827
Stillwater	4,804	82.18%	1,042	17.82%	0	0.00%	3,762	64.35%	5,846
Sweet Grass	1,833	77.80%	521	22.11%	2	0.08%	1,312	55.69%	2,356
Teton	2,592	73.51%	923	26.18%	11	0.31%	1,669	47.33%	3,526
Toole	1,601	79.65%	406	20.20%	3	0.15%	1,195	59.45%	2,010
Treasure	381	86.59%	59	13.41%	0	0.00%	322	73.18%	440
Valley	3,030	75.92%	951	23.83%	10	0.25%	2,079	52.09%	3,991
Wheatland	873	81.21%	196	18.23%	6	0.56%	677	62.98%	1,075
Wibaux	459	86.28%	70	13.16%	3	0.56%	389	73.12%	532
Yellowstone	52,114	64.89%	27,859	34.69%	338	0.42%	24,255	30.20%	80,311
Totals	181,832	65.73%	93,713	33.87%	1,107	0.40%	88,119	31.85%	276,652

== See also ==
- 2024 Montana elections

== Notes ==
Partisan clients
