= Senator Holden =

Senator Holden may refer to:

- Edgar Holden (1914–2001), Iowa State Senate
- Hendrick S. Holden (1849–1918), New York State Senate
- Kip Holden (1952–2025), Louisiana State Senate
- Nate Holden (1929–2025), California State Senate
- Ric Holden (born 1961), Montana State Senate
- Wayne Holden (1918–2009), Oklahoma State Senate
- William Holden (politician) (died 1884), California State Senate
