= Ric Holden =

American politician

Member of the Montana Senate from the 1st district
- In office January 2, 1995 – January 6, 2003
- Preceded by: Betty Bruski-Maus
- Succeeded by: Keith Bales

Personal details
- Born: August 31, 1961 (age 65) Spokane, Washington, U.S.
- Party: Republican
- Spouse: Jan
- Children: 3
- Education: Montana State University (BA)

Ric Holden (born August 31, 1961) is an American politician from the state of Montana. A member of the Republican Party, he represented the 1st district in the Montana Senate from 1995 to 2003. He succeeded Betty Bruski-Maus.

== Career ==
Holden was elected to the Montana Senate in 1994 and re-elected in 1998. He did not seek re-election in 2002 as he was term limited. After leaving office, he returned to working as a rancher.

Holden has announced that he will run for U.S. House in the 2nd congressional district in the 2024 election if incumbent Republican Matt Rosendale runs for the United States Senate.

== Personal life ==
Holden lives in Glendive.
