= Lee Metcalf =

American politician and judge (1911–1978)

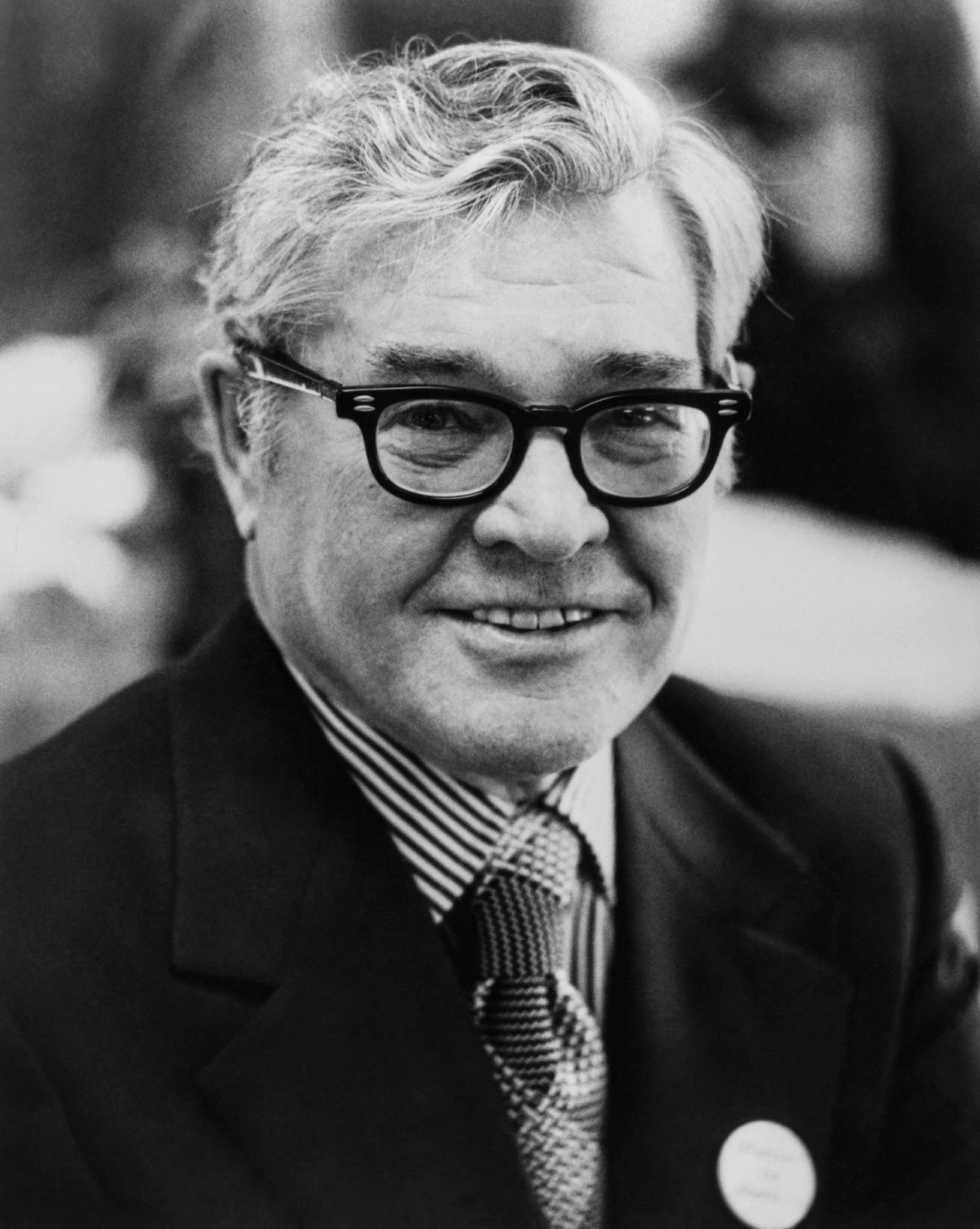
- Metcalf in 1978

Permanent Acting President pro tempore of the United States Senate
- In office June 15, 1963 – January 3, 1969*
- Preceded by: Carl Hayden
- Succeeded by: Richard Russell Jr.

United States Senator from Montana
- In office January 3, 1961 – January 12, 1978
- Preceded by: James E. Murray
- Succeeded by: Paul G. Hatfield

Member of the U.S. House of Representatives from Montana's 1st district
- In office January 3, 1953 – January 3, 1961
- Preceded by: Mike Mansfield
- Succeeded by: Arnold Olsen

Personal details
- Born: Lee Warren Metcalf; January 28, 1911 Stevensville, Montana, U.S.
- Died: January 12, 1978 (aged 66) Helena, Montana, U.S.
- Party: Democratic
- Spouse: Donna Hoover
- Education: Stanford University (BA); University of Montana, Missoula (LLB)

Military service
- Allegiance: United States
- Branch/service: United States Army
- Years of service: 1942–1946
- Rank: First Lieutenant
- Battles/wars: World War II
- *While no term was designated for this role and Metcalf technically held it until his death, in effect he was appointed as permanent acting president pro tempore while Hayden was ill, and Hayden's term ended in 1969.

Lee Warren Metcalf (January 28, 1911 – January 12, 1978) was an American lawyer, judge, and politician. A member of the Democratic Party, he served as a U.S. representative (1953–1961) and a U.S. senator (1961–1978) from Montana. He was the first of Montana's U.S. senators to be born in the state, and was permanent acting president pro tempore of the Senate, the only one to hold that position, from 1963 until his death in 1978.

== Early life and education ==
Metcalf was born in Stevensville, Montana, to Harold E. and Rhoda (née Smith) Metcalf. His father was the cashier of the First State Bank of Stevensville. He was raised on his family's farm. He graduated from Stevensville High School in 1928, and then studied at the University of Montana (then known as Montana State University, which is now the name of a different institution) where he played first-string tackle on the freshman football team.

After attending Montana State for one year, Metcalf moved to California and spent a year working for the Los Angeles City School Gardens. He then enrolled at Stanford University, where he received a Bachelor of Arts degree in history and economics in 1936. During his time at Stanford, he was a member of the Sigma Chi fraternity and played football under Pop Warner. Also in 1936, he received his law degree from University of Montana Law School and was admitted to the bar.

== Early career ==
Metcalf then commenced the practice of law, opening an office in Stevensville. In November 1936, he was elected as a Democrat to the Montana House of Representatives from Ravalli County. As a state legislator, he introduced bills to establish a thirty-cent minimum wage and to require mining companies to pay their employees for the time they spent in the mines after their shifts. He served as Assistant Attorney General of Montana from 1937 to 1941, after which he resumed his law practice. In 1938, he married Donna Hoover; the couple had one son, Jerry, who also served as a state representative.

In 1942, Metcalf enlisted in the U.S. Army, and was commissioned after attending officers' training school. He participated in the Invasion of Normandy as a staff officer with the Fifth Corps. He also participated in later European campaigns, such as the Battle of the Bulge, with the 1st Army, Ninth Infantry Division, and 60th Infantry Regiment. Following the war, he served as a military government officer in Germany, where he helped draft ordinances for the first free local elections, set up a civilian court and occupation police system, and supervise repatriation camps for displaced persons. He was discharged from the Army as a first lieutenant in April 1946.

In 1946, when Justice Leif Erickson resigned to run against Burton K. Wheeler for the U.S. Senate, Metcalf was elected an associate justice of the Montana Supreme Court. He served one six-year term in that office.

== U.S. House of Representatives ==
In 1952, when Mike Mansfield decided to run for the Senate against Zales Ecton, Metcalf successfully campaigned for the U.S. House of Representatives in Montana's 1st congressional district. In the general election, he narrowly defeated his Republican opponent, former U.S. Attorney Wellington D. Rankin, by a margin of 50%-49%. He was subsequently re-elected to three more terms in 1954, 1956, and 1958, never receiving less than 56% of the vote.

During his tenure in the House, Metcalf served on the Education and Labor Committee (1953–1959), Interior and Insular Affairs Committee (1955–1959), Select Astronautics and Space Exploration Committee (1958), and Ways and Means Committee (1959–1960). He became known as one of Congress's "Young Turks" who promoted liberal domestic social legislation and reform of congressional procedures. He introduced legislation to provide health care to the elderly ten years before the creation of Medicare. He earned the nickname "Mr. Education" after sponsoring a comprehensive bill providing for federal aid to education. He also voted against legislation that would have raised grazing permits on federal lands, and led the opposition to a bill that would have swapped forested public lands for cutover private lands. He was elected chairman of the Democratic Study Group in 1959.

== U.S. Senate ==
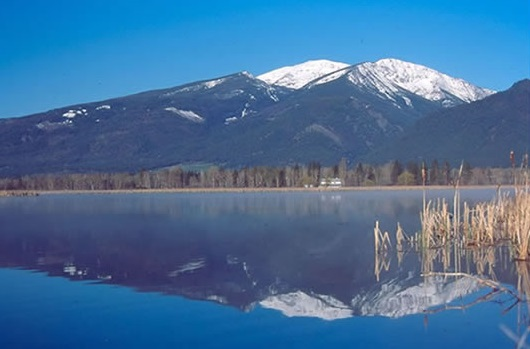
Lee Metcalf National Wildlife Refuge, Montana

In 1960, after Democratic incumbent James E. Murray decided to retire, Metcalf ran for Murray's seat in the U.S. Senate. He won the Democratic nomination over John W. Bonner, a former Governor of Montana. In the general election, he narrowly defeated Republican Orvin B. Fjare, a conservative former U.S. Representative, by a margin of 51% to 49%.

Regarded as "a pioneer of the conservation movement," Metcalf worked to protect the natural environment and regulate utilities. He helped pass the Wilderness Act of 1964, and supported the creation of the Great Bear Wilderness and the Absaroka-Beartooth Wilderness. In 1962, he introduced a "Save Our Streams" bill to preserve natural recreation facilities and protect fish and wildlife from being destroyed by highway construction. He was a longtime member of the Migratory Bird Conservation Commission. He was also active on the issue of education. He was a leading supporter of the Elementary and Secondary Education Act, the effort to extend the G.I. Bill's educational benefits to a new generation of veterans, and the development of legislation to improve federally aided vocational education. The Peace Corps was established under leadership of Metcalf and Senator Mansfield.

He was reelected after competitive campaigns in 1966 and 1972. In 1977, Metcalf announced that he would not seek a fourth Senate term in 1978.

=== Permanent Acting President pro tempore of the Senate ===
In June 1963, because of the illness of President pro tempore Carl Hayden (D-AZ), Senator Metcalf was designated Permanent Acting President pro tempore of the United States Senate to carry out Hayden's duties at this time. No term was imposed on this designation, so Metcalf retained it until he died in office in 1978. He was the only person to hold this title.

Permanent Acting President pro tem should not be confused with the office of Deputy President pro tempore.

== Death and legacy ==
At age 66, Metcalf died of a heart attack in his sleep at his home in Helena on January 12, 1978, and was cremated; his ashes were scattered in one of his favorite areas in the wilderness of Montana. His death was overshadowed by the death of his colleague from Minnesota, former Vice President Hubert H. Humphrey the next day.

In 1978, Montana's Ravalli National Wildlife Refuge was renamed the Lee Metcalf National Wildlife Refuge. In 1983, by act of Congress, the Lee Metcalf Wilderness area was created in southwestern Montana in his honor.

Metcalf was ranked fifteenth on a list of the 100 Most Influential Montanans of the Century in the newspaper The Missoulian.

== See also ==
- List of members of the United States Congress who died in office (1950–1999)

Legal offices
Preceded by Claude F. Morris	Justice of the Montana Supreme Court; 1947–1952	Succeeded by Forrest H. Anderson
U.S. House of Representatives
Preceded by Mike Mansfield	Member of the U.S. House of Representatives from Montana's 1st congressional district 1953–1961	Succeeded by Arnold Olsen
Party political offices
Preceded by James E. Murray	Democratic nominee for U.S. Senator from Montana (Class 2); 1960, 1966, 1972	Succeeded by Max Baucus
U.S. Senate
Preceded by James E. Murray	U.S. Senator (Class 2) from Montana; 1961–1978; Served alongside: Mike Mansfield, John Melcher	Succeeded by Paul G. Hatfield
Political offices
Preceded by Carl Hayden	President pro tempore of the U.S. Senate; Permanent Acting; 1963–1969	Succeeded by Richard Russell Jr.
