= Frederick Irving =

American diplomat (1921–2016)

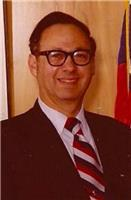

United States Ambassador to Jamaica
- In office July 18, 1977 – November 22, 1978
- President: Jimmy Carter
- Preceded by: Sumner Gerard
- Succeeded by: Loren E. Lawrence

2nd Assistant Secretary of State for Oceans and International Environmental and Scientific Affairs
- In office April 28, 1976 – March 26, 1977
- President: Gerald Ford
- Preceded by: Dixy Lee Ray
- Succeeded by: Patsy Mink

United States Ambassador to Iceland
- In office October 11, 1972 – April 21, 1976
- President: Richard Nixon
- Preceded by: Luther Replogle
- Succeeded by: James J. Blake

Personal details
- Born: May 2, 1921 Providence, Rhode Island, U.S.
- Died: November 13, 2016 (aged 95) Amherst, Massachusetts, U.S.
- Resting place: Arlington National Cemetery
- Spouse: Dorothy Petrie (m. 1946; died 2010)
- Education: Brown University (BA); The Fletcher School (MA); National War College

Military service
- Allegiance: United States
- Branch/service: United States Army (Army Air Forces)
- Years of service: 1943–1945
- Rank: First Lieutenant
- Battles/wars: World War II
- Awards: Purple Heart

Frederick Irving (May 2, 1921 – November 13, 2016) was an American diplomat and civil servant. He was United States Ambassador to Iceland from 1972 to 1976, Assistant Secretary of State for Oceans and International Environmental and Scientific Affairs from 1976 to 1977, and United States Ambassador to Jamaica from 1977 to 1978.

== Biography ==
Frederick Irving was born in Providence, Rhode Island, on May 2, 1921. He studied at Classical High School, where he met his future wife, Dorothy. He was educated at Brown University, receiving an A.B. in political science in 1943.

After graduating from Brown, Irving served in the United States Army Air Corps for the remainder of World War II as a navigator. On his 37th bombing mission, his B-24 Liberator heavy bomber was shot down over Hungary as he was returning from bombing the Blechhammer oil refinery. He spent the remainder of the war as a prisoner of war at Stalag Luft III.

After the war, he attended Fletcher School of Law and Diplomacy at Tufts University and received an M.A. in international relations. He then studied at the National War College.

Irving then joined the United States Foreign Service and worked there for 32 years. In September 1972, President of the United States Richard Nixon nominated Irving to be United States Ambassador to Iceland. He served there until 1976. In 1976, President Gerald Ford nominated Irving as Assistant Secretary of State for Oceans and International Environmental and Scientific Affairs and he held this position until 1977. President Jimmy Carter then named him United States Ambassador to Jamaica.

Irving retired in 1978, and died on November 13, 2016.

== Bibliography ==
- Irving, Frederick (2016). "Mr. President, Do You Think I Have Rocks In My Head?" Experiences of Frederick Irving. Levellers Press. ISBN 978-1937146900.

Diplomatic posts
Preceded by Luther Replogle	United States Ambassador to Iceland; October 11, 1972 – April 21, 1976	Succeeded by James J. Blake
Government offices
Preceded by Dixy Lee Ray	Assistant Secretary of State for Oceans and International Environmental and Scientific Affairs; April 28, 1976 – March 26, 1977	Succeeded by Patsy Mink
Diplomatic posts
Preceded by Sumner Gerard	United States Ambassador to Jamaica; July 18, 1977 – November 22, 1978	Succeeded by Loren E. Lawrence
