= Wesley A. D'Ewart =

American politician

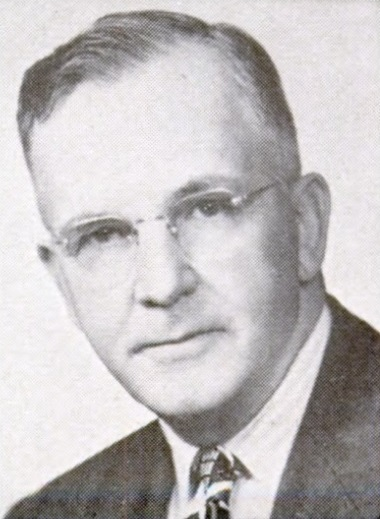

Member of the U.S. House of Representatives from Montana's 2nd district
- In office June 5, 1945 – January 3, 1955
- Preceded by: James F. O'Connor
- Succeeded by: Orvin B. Fjare

Member of the Montana Senate
- In office 1941–1945

Member of the Montana House of Representatives
- In office 1937–1939

Personal details
- Born: October 1, 1889 Worcester, Massachusetts, U.S.
- Died: September 2, 1973 (aged 83) Livingston, Montana, U.S.
- Party: Republican
- Education: Washington State College at Pullman

Wesley Abner D'Ewart (October 1, 1889 – September 2, 1973) was a U.S. Republican politician who served in the United States House of Representatives from Montana's 2nd congressional district from June 5, 1945, to January 3, 1955.

== Early life ==
Wesley D'Ewart was born in Worcester, Massachusetts to William John D'Ewart and Mary Elizabeth Barnard. He attended Washington State College at Pullman. In 1910, D'Ewart moved to Wilsall, Montana, where he settled in Park County. Before entering politics, D'Ewart worked in ranching and for the Forest Service.

== Political career ==
Throughout his career, D’Ewart was a staunch member of the Republican Party. In 1936, D’Ewart was elected to the Montana House of Representatives. He served there for three years, then was elected to the Montana Senate in 1940. D’Ewart served in the Senate from 1941 to 1945.

When United States Congressman James F. O'Connor, who represented Montana's 2nd congressional district died on January 15, 1945, a special election was held to replace him, which D'Ewart won. He was re-elected in 1946 against Democratic nominee John J. Holmes by a wide margin, and in 1948, he defeated Willard E. Fraser to narrowly win re-election. D'Ewart was re-elected in 1950 and 1952 against John J. Holmes.

Rather than seek re-election, D'Ewart ran for the United States Senate against incumbent Democratic Senator James E. Murray in 1954. Following a close and contentious election, Murray narrowly defeated D'Ewart to win his final term in the Senate.

D'Ewart served as an assistant to the United States Secretary of Agriculture from January 1955 to September 1955. He was in charge of lands and reclamation. He was Assistant Secretary of the Department of the Interior from October 1955 to July 1956. From August 1956 to October 1958 he was a special representative for the Secretary of Agriculture.

When incumbent Governor J. Hugo Aronson declined to seek reelection as Governor of Montana in 1960, D'Ewart ran to succeed him, and lost to former State Senator Donald Grant Nutter in the Republican primary by fewer than five hundred votes. (Nutter went on to win the general election.)

== Publications ==
- D'Ewart, Wesley Abner. Promoting the interests of the Fort Fall Indian irrigation project, Idaho. House Report: 80th Congress, 2nd Session, June 15, 1948.
- D'Ewart, Wesley Abner. Revised Organic Act of the Virgin Islands. House Report: 83rd Congress, 2nd Session, July 9, 1954.
- D'Ewart, Wesley. Eisenhower Administration Project. [New York]: Columbia University Oral History Research Office, 1967.

D'Ewart's 1954 election committee also published Senator Murray and the Red Web Over Congress.

== Later years ==
D’Ewart retired from politics and lived in Wilsall, Montana. During his retirement, D’Ewart remained active in the Republican Party. He followed Montana elections closely and worked as an activist and strategist. D'Ewart was a director of the National Water Resources Association, and he served on the Western States Water Council from 1966 to 1969. He died in Livingston, Montana, on September 2, 1973. D'Ewart was buried at Mountain View Cemetery in Livingston. His papers are now held by the Montana State University Library's Archives and Special Collections.

Party political offices
Preceded by Tom J. Davis	Republican nominee for U.S. Senator from Montana (Class 2); 1954	Succeeded by Orvin B. Fjare
U.S. House of Representatives
Preceded by James F. O'Connor	United States Representative for the 2nd congressional district of Montana; 1945–1955	Succeeded by Orvin B. Fjare
