= 1966 United States Senate election in Montana =

- November 8, 1966
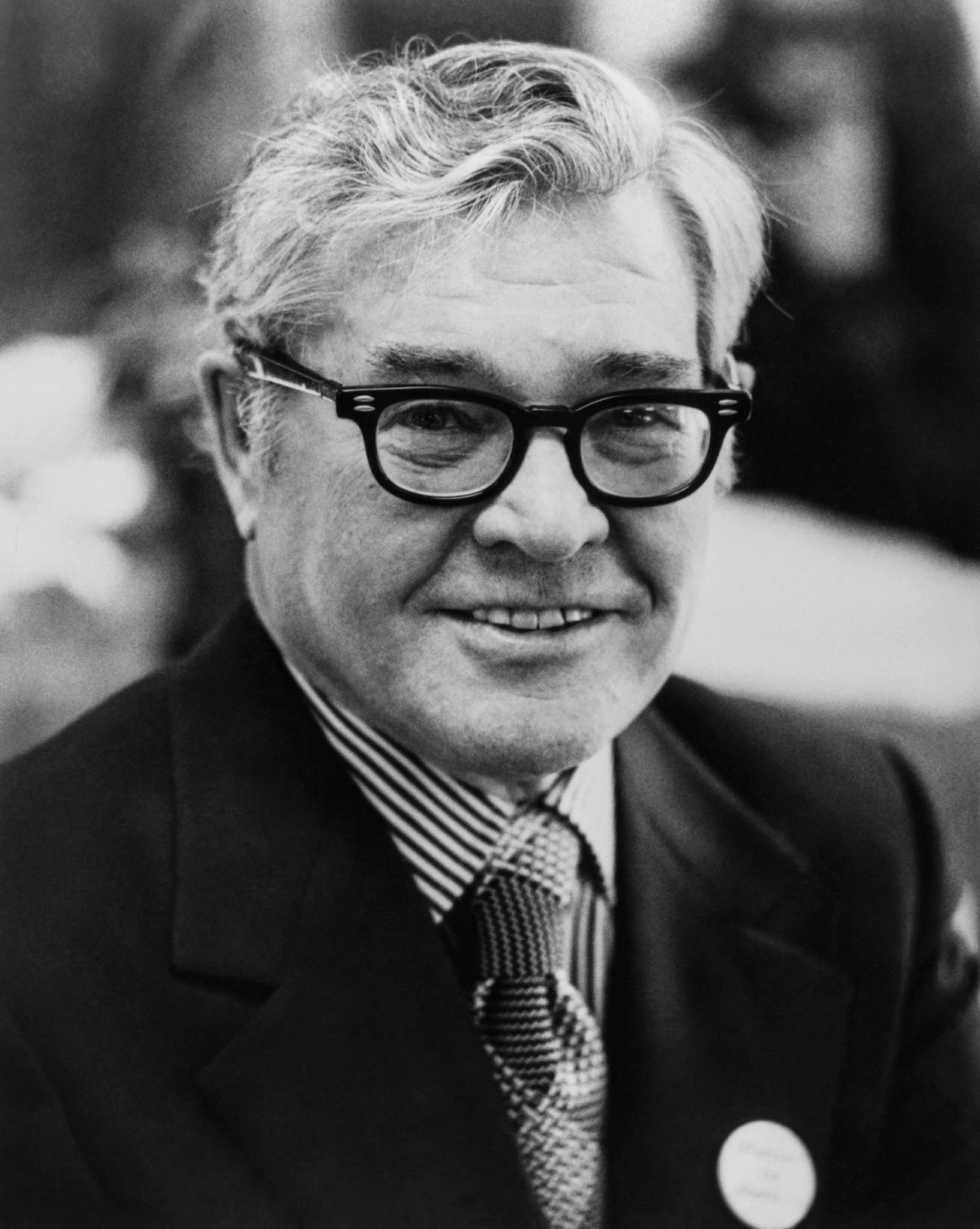

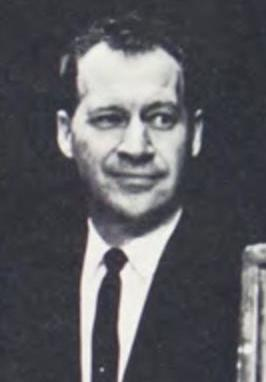
Nominee	Lee Metcalf	Tim Babcock
Party	Democratic	Republican
Popular vote	138,166	121,697
Percentage	53.17%	46.83%
- County results Metcalf: 50–60% 60–70% 70–80% Babcock: 50–60% 60–70%
U.S. senator before election
Lee Metcalf
Democratic
Elected U.S. Senator
Lee Metcalf
Democratic

The 1966 United States Senate election in Montana took place on November 8, 1966. Incumbent United States Senator Lee Metcalf, who was first elected to the Senate in 1960, ran for re-election. He won the Democratic primary uncontested, and moved on to the general election, where he was opposed by Tim M. Babcock, the Republican nominee and the Governor of Montana. Though the race remained close, Metcalf was able to expand on his 1960 margin of victory, and defeated Babcock to win a second term.

== Democratic primary ==
=== Candidates ===
- Lee Metcalf, incumbent United States Senator

=== Results ===
Democratic Party primary results
Party	Candidate	Votes	%
Democratic	Lee Metcalf (incumbent)	73,975	100.00%
Total votes		73,975	100.00%

== Republican primary ==
=== Candidates ===
- Tim M. Babcock, Governor of Montana

=== Results ===
Republican Primary results
Party	Candidate	Votes	%
Republican	Tim M. Babcock	54,828	100.00%
Total votes		54,828	100.00%

== General election ==
=== Results ===
United States Senate election in Montana, 1966
Party	Candidate	Votes	%	±%
Democratic	Lee Metcalf (incumbent)	138,166	53.17%	+2.44%
Republican	Tim M. Babcock	121,697	46.83%	−2.44%
Majority		16,469	6.34%	+4.87%
Turnout		259,863		
Democratic hold		Swing		

== See also ==
- United States Senate elections, 1966
