= James F. O'Connor =

American politician

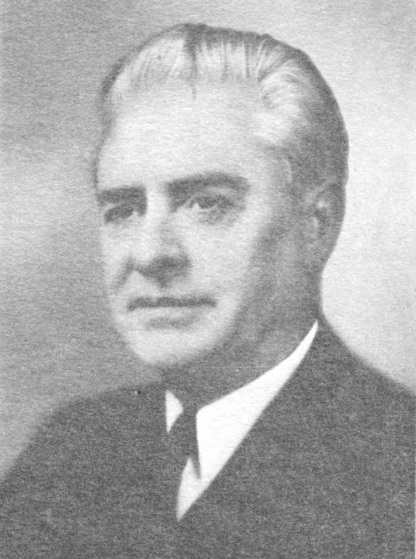

Member of the U.S. House of Representatives from Montana's 2nd district
- In office January 3, 1937 – January 15, 1945
- Preceded by: Roy E. Ayers
- Succeeded by: Wesley A. D'Ewart

Member of the Montana House of Representatives
- In office 1917–1918

Personal details
- Born: May 7, 1878 near California Junction, Iowa, U.S.
- Died: January 15, 1945 (aged 66) Washington, D.C., U.S.
- Party: Democratic
- Education: University of Nebraska–Lincoln

James Francis O'Connor (May 7, 1878 – January 15, 1945) was a U.S. representative from Montana.

== Biography ==
O'Connor was born on a farm near California Junction, Iowa, and attended grade school and normal school in Iowa. He graduated from the law department of the University of Nebraska–Lincoln in 1904, was admitted to the bar and commenced practice in Livingston, Montana in 1905. O'Connor self-identified as being Irish Catholic.

In addition to practicing law, O'Connor engaged in stock raising, ranching, and banking. He served as judge of Montana's sixth judicial district in 1912. He served in the Montana House of Representatives from 1917 to 1918 and was the Speaker of the House.

O'Connor served as special counsel for the Federal Trade Commission in Washington, D.C., in 1918. He also served as member of Park County High School Board for a number of years. Following the death of United States Senator Thomas J. Walsh, O'Connor ran for the Democratic nomination to succeed Walsh in the 1934 special election, challenging James E. Murray and John E. Erickson, who, as Governor of Montana, had appointed himself to the seat. O'Connor lost to Murray, but finished ahead of Erickson. Murray went on to win the general election.

In 1936 incumbent United States Congressman Roy E. Ayers ran for Governor and O'Connor ran to succeed him in Montana's 2nd congressional district. O'Connor won the Democratic primary and defeated T. S. Stockdahl, the Republican nominee, in a landslide. O'Connor was narrowly re-elected in 1938 over W. C. Husband when Republicans nationwide gained eighty-one House seats. He won re-election in 1940 in a landslide against Melvin N. Hoiness, and again in 1942 against F. F. Haynes by a much narrower margin. O'Connor was an isolationist during the buildup to World War II, and he voted against providing aid to Britain in 1941.

O'Connor served as the Chairman of the House Committee on Indian Affairs during the 78th United States Congress, from 1943 to 1945. He defeated Haynes once again in 1944, winning his fifth term.

O'Connor died in Washington, D.C., on January 15, 1945, just weeks after beginning his fifth term. He was interred in Mount Calvary Cemetery, Livingston, Montana.

== See also ==
- List of members of the United States Congress who died in office (1900–1949)

U.S. House of Representatives
Preceded by Roy E. Ayers	Member of the U.S. House of Representatives from Montana's 2nd congressional district 1937-1945	Succeeded by Wesley A. D'Ewart
