= LeRoy H. Anderson =

American politician

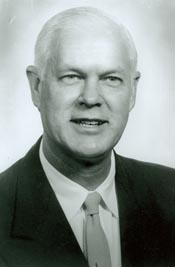

Member of the U.S. House of Representatives from Montana's 2nd district
- In office January 3, 1957 – January 3, 1961
- Preceded by: Orvin B. Fjare
- Succeeded by: James F. Battin

Member of the Montana Senate
- In office 1949–1956

Member of the Montana House of Representatives
- In office 1947–1948

Personal details
- Born: February 2, 1906 Ellendale, North Dakota, U.S.
- Died: September 25, 1991 (aged 85) Conrad, Montana, U.S.
- Party: Democratic Party
- Education: California Institute of Technology

Military service
- Allegiance: United States of America
- Branch/service: United States Army United States Army Reserve
- Years of service: 1942 – 1962
- Rank: Major General
- Unit: 5th Armored Division 96th Infantry Division
- Battles/wars: World War II

LeRoy Hagen Anderson (February 2, 1906 – September 25, 1991) was a U.S. representative from Montana.

== Biography ==
Born in Ellendale, North Dakota, Anderson, the grandson of Norwegian immigrants, moved with his parents to Conrad, Montana, in 1909. He graduated with a B.S. degree from Montana State College in 1927, and went on to do postgraduate work in mathematics and physical chemistry in 1935–1938 at California Institute of Technology in Pasadena, California. He later worked as a wheat and cattle rancher. During the Second World War he served as commander of an armored task force in the European Theater of Operations in combat from Normandy to the Elbe River. He was separated from the service as a lieutenant colonel in 1945. For his service, he received the Silver Star and Croix de Guerre Medal with Palm. He served as a Major general in Army Reserve, commanding the 96th Infantry Division Reserve from 1948 through 1962.

He served as a member of the Montana House of Representatives in 1947 and 1948 and the Montana State Senate from 1949 through 1956, serving as Democratic floor leader 1954–1956. He was an unsuccessful candidate for election in 1954 to the Eighty-fourth Congress.

Anderson was elected as a Democrat to the Eighty-fifth and Eighty-sixth Congresses (January 3, 1957 – January 3, 1961). He was not a candidate for renomination in 1960 but was unsuccessful for the Democratic nomination for United States Senator. He resumed engineering pursuits. He served as member of the Montana State senate from 1966 to 1970. He was a resident of Conrad, Montana, until his death there on September 25, 1991.

U.S. House of Representatives
Preceded by Orvin B. Fjare	Member of the U.S. House of Representatives from Montana's 2nd congressional district 1957-1961	Succeeded by James F. Battin
