= Montana's congressional districts =

Territories in US state

Map of Montana's congressional districts since 2023 Interactive map version

Montana has two congressional districts. A state since 1889, it gained its second seat in the U.S. House for the 1912 election. Both seats were at-large selections on the ballot (entire state) for three elections, until the two districts were established prior to the 1918 election. The two districts were eliminated and the at-large district re-established from the 1992 until the 2020 elections, when it was again eliminated in favor of two districts after the 2020 census.

== Current districts and representatives ==
This is a list of United States representatives from Montana, district boundary maps, and the district political ratings according to the CPVI. The delegation has a total of 2 members, both with the Republican Party.

Current U.S. representatives from Montana
District	Member (Residence)	Party	Incumbent since	CPVI (2025)	District map
1st	Ryan Zinke (Whitefish)	Republican	January 3, 2023	R+5	
2nd	Troy Downing (Helena)	Republican	January 3, 2025	R+15	

== See also ==
- List of United States congressional districts
