= 1960 United States Senate election in Montana =

- November 8, 1960
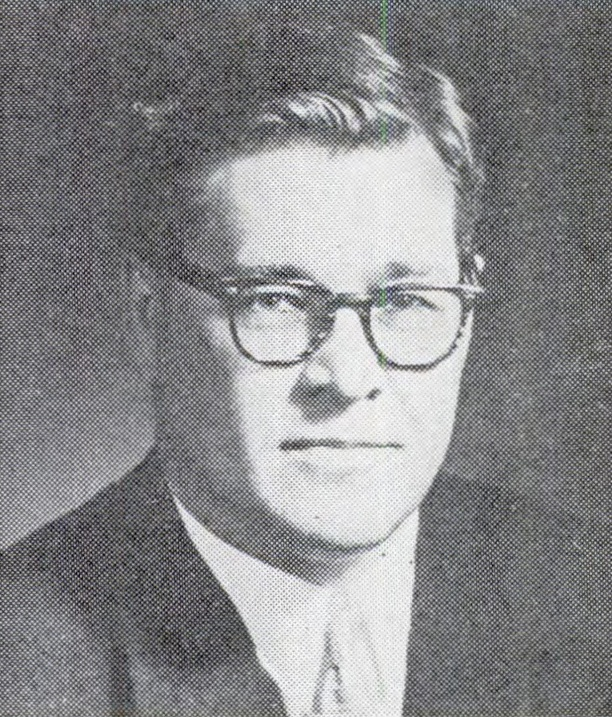

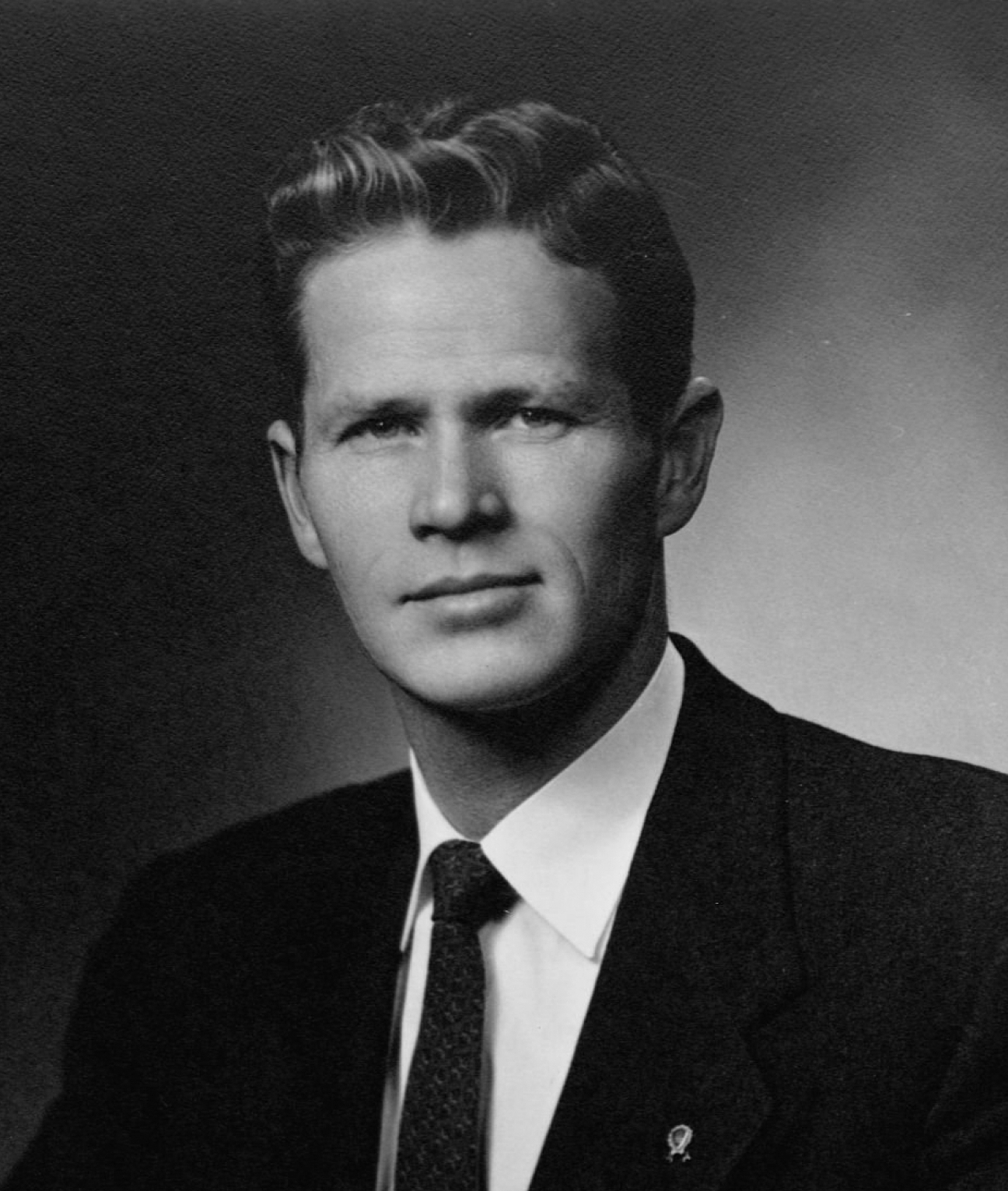
Nominee	Lee Metcalf	Orvin B. Fjare
Party	Democratic	Republican
Popular vote	140,331	136,281
Percentage	50.73%	49.27%
- County results Metcalf: 50–60% 60–70% Fjare: 50–60% 60–70% 70–80%
U.S. senator before election
James E. Murray
Democratic
Elected U.S. Senator
Lee Metcalf
Democratic

The 1960 United States Senate election in Montana took place on November 8, 1960. Incumbent United States Senator James E. Murray, who was first elected to the Senate in a special election in 1934 and was re-elected in 1936, 1942, and 1948, and 1954, declined to seek re-election, creating an open seat. United States Congressman Lee Metcalf won out in a crowded Democratic primary and faced off against former United States Congressman Orvin B. Fjare, who won in a similarly crowded Republican primary. Following a close general election, Metcalf narrowly defeated Fjare to win his first term in the Senate.

== Democratic primary ==
=== Candidates ===
- Lee Metcalf, United States Congressman from Montana's 1st congressional district
- John W. Bonner, former Governor of Montana
- LeRoy H. Anderson, United States Congressman from Montana's 2nd congressional district
- John W. Mahan, former National Commander of the Veterans of Foreign Wars

=== Results ===
Democratic Party primary results
Party	Candidate	Votes	%
Democratic	Lee Metcalf	45,339	35.16%
Democratic	John W. Bonner	33,246	25.78%
Democratic	LeRoy H. Anderson	26,152	20.28%
Democratic	John W. Mahan	24,208	18.77%
Total votes		75,798	100.00%

== Republican primary ==
=== Candidates ===
- Orvin B. Fjare, former United States Congressman from Montana's 2nd congressional district
- Sumner Gerard, State Representative
- Wayne Montgomery, rancher
- James H. Morrow
- Fred J. Martin
- L. A. Wilson

=== Results ===
Republican Primary results
Party	Candidate	Votes	%
Republican	Orvin B. Fjare	25,899	38.71%
Republican	Sumner Gerard	17,932	26.80%
Republican	Wayne Montgomery	13,527	20.22%
Republican	James H. Morrow	5,261	7.86%
Republican	Fred J. Martin	2,804	4.19%
Republican	L. A. Wilson	1,482	2.22%
Total votes		66,905	100.00%

== General election ==
=== Results ===
United States Senate election in Montana, 1960
Party	Candidate	Votes	%	±%
Democratic	Lee Metcalf	140,331	50.73%	+0.35%
Republican	Orvin B. Fjare	136,281	49.27%	−0.35%
Majority		4,050	1.46%	+0.70%
Turnout		276,612		
Democratic hold		Swing		
