= Montana's 2nd congressional district =

U.S. House district for Montana

- Montana's 2nd congressional district covers central and eastern Montana. Points indicate major cities in the district, sorted by population: 1. Billings 2. Great Falls 3. Helena
- Representative: Troy Downing; R–Helena
- Population (2025): 559,699
- Median household income: $75,523
- Ethnicity: 81.4% White; 7.5% Native American; 5.1% Two or more races; 4.2% Hispanic; 0.7% Asian; 0.6% Black; 0.5% other
- Cook PVI: R+15

Montana's second congressional district is a congressional district in the United States House of Representatives that was apportioned after the 2020 United States census. The first candidates ran in the 2022 elections for a seat in the 118th United States Congress.

Geographically, the district is the second-largest by land area, after Alaska's at-large congressional district, and the largest by land area in the contiguous United States. It is also the largest district in the U.S. to not contain an entire state.

From 1913 to 1993, Montana had two congressional seats. From 1913 to 1919, those seats were elected statewide at-large on a general ticket. After 1919, however, the state was divided into geographical districts. The 2nd covered the eastern part of the state, including Billings, Glendive, Miles City, and other towns. After 1993, the second seat was eliminated and the remaining seat was elected at-large.

After the release of the 2020 United States census results, Montana regained its 2nd congressional district. On November 12, 2021, Montana's Districting and Apportionment Commission approved a new congressional map in which the 2nd congressional district would cover the eastern portion of Montana, in a configuration similar to the 1983–1993 map. However, the state capital, Helena, which had historically been in the 1st district, was drawn into the 2nd district.

Except for the city of Helena and some Native American areas like Big Horn County and part of longtime national bellwether Blaine County, the district is powerfully Republican. Overall, it is one of the most Republican districts in the West, with a Cook Partisan Voting Index of R+15, and it voted for Donald Trump by nearly 27 percentage points in the 2020 presidential election.

== Recent election results from statewide races ==
Year	Office	Results
2008	President	McCain 52% - 45%
2012	Senate	Tester 46.8% - 46.6%
2016	President	Trump 61% - 32%
2016	Governor	Gianforte 49% - 47%
2016	Secretary of State	Stapleton 58% - 38%
2016	Attorney General	Fox 73% - 27%
2016	Auditor	Rosendale 58% - 42%
2018	Senate	Tester 50% - 46%
2020	President	Trump 62% - 35%
2020	Senate	Daines 60% - 40%
2020	Governor	Gianforte 59% - 37%
2020	Secretary of State	Jacobsen 65% - 35%
2020	Attorney General	Knudsen 63% - 37%
2020	Auditor	Downing 61% - 34%
2024	President	Trump 63% - 34%
2024	Senate	Sheehy 57% - 41%
2024	Governor	Gianforte 64% - 33%
2024	Secretary of State	Jacobsen 66% - 31%
2024	Attorney General	Knudsen 64% - 36%
2024	Auditor	Brown 66% - 34%

== Composition ==
The second district includes all of the following counties, with the exception of Pondera, which it shares with the 1st. Pondera County communities in the 1st district include Brady, Conrad, and Midway Colony.

#	County	Seat	Population
3	Big Horn	Hardin	12,751
5	Blaine	Chinook	6,899
7	Broadwater	Townsend	8,032
9	Carbon	Red Lodge	11,419
11	Carter	Ekalaka	1,418
13	Cascade	Great Falls	84,900
15	Chouteau	Fort Benton	5,847
17	Custer	Miles City	11,985
19	Daniels	Scobey	1,633
21	Dawson	Glendive	8,810
25	Fallon	Baker	2,994
27	Fergus	Lewistown	11,772
33	Garfield	Jordan	1,211
37	Golden Valley	Ryegate	835
41	Hill	Havre	16,276
43	Jefferson	Boulder	13,048
45	Judith Basin	Stanford	2,093
49	Lewis and Clark	Helena	75,011
51	Liberty	Chester	1,974
55	McCone	Circle	1,676
59	Meagher	White Sulphur Springs	2,071
65	Musselshell	Roundup	5,308
67	Park	Livingston	17,903
69	Petroleum	Winnett	554
71	Phillips	Malta	4,249
73	Pondera	Conrad	6,125
75	Powder River	Broadus	1,743
79	Prairie	Terry	1,112
83	Richland	Sidney	11,173
85	Roosevelt	Wolf Point	10,319
87	Rosebud	Forsyth	8,160
91	Sheridan	Plentywood	3,498
95	Stillwater	Columbus	9,173
97	Sweet Grass	Big Timber	3,763
99	Teton	Choteau	6,430
101	Toole	Shelby	6,133
103	Treasure	Hysham	772
105	Valley	Glasgow	7,474
107	Wheatland	Harlowton	2,057
109	Wibaux	Wibaux	910
111	Yellowstone	Billings	170,843

== List of members representing the district ==
Member	Party	Years	Cong ress	Electoral history
District established March 4, 1919
Carl W. Riddick (Lewistown)	Republican	March 4, 1919 – March 3, 1923	66th 67th	Elected in 1918. Re-elected in 1920. Retired to run for U.S. senator.
Scott Leavitt (Great Falls)	Republican	March 4, 1923 – March 3, 1933	68th 69th 70th 71st 72nd	Elected in 1922. Re-elected in 1924. Re-elected in 1926. Re-elected in 1928. Re-elected in 1930. Lost re-election.
Roy E. Ayers (Lewistown)	Democratic	March 4, 1933 – January 3, 1937	73rd 74th	Elected in 1932. Re-elected in 1934. Retired to run for Governor of Montana.
James F. O'Connor (Livingston)	Democratic	January 3, 1937 – January 15, 1945	75th 76th 77th 78th 79th	Elected in 1936. Re-elected in 1938. Re-elected in 1940. Re-elected in 1942. Re-elected in 1944. Died.
Vacant		January 15, 1945 – June 5, 1945	79th	
Wesley A. D'Ewart (Wilsall)	Republican	June 5, 1945 – January 3, 1955	79th 80th 81st 82nd 83rd	Elected to finish O'Connor's term. Re-elected in 1946. Re-elected in 1948. Re-elected in 1950. Re-elected in 1952. Retired to run for U.S. senator.
Orvin B. Fjare (Big Timber)	Republican	January 3, 1955 – January 3, 1957	84th	Elected in 1954. Lost re-election.
LeRoy H. Anderson (Conrad)	Democratic	January 3, 1957 – January 3, 1961	85th 86th	Elected in 1956. Re-elected in 1958. Retired to run for U.S. senator.
James F. Battin (Billings)	Republican	January 3, 1961 – February 27, 1969	87th 88th 89th 90th 91st	Elected in 1960. Re-elected in 1962. Re-elected in 1964. Re-elected in 1966. Re-elected in 1968. Resigned to become judge of the U.S. District Court of Montana.
Vacant		February 27, 1969 – June 24, 1969	91st	
John Melcher (Forsyth)	Democratic	June 24, 1969 – January 3, 1977	91st 92nd 93rd 94th	Elected to finish Battin's term. Re-elected in 1970. Re-elected in 1972. Re-elected in 1974. Retired to run for U.S. senator.
Ron Marlenee (Scobey)	Republican	January 3, 1977 – January 3, 1993	95th 96th 97th 98th 99th 100th 101st 102nd	Elected in 1976. Re-elected in 1978. Re-elected in 1980. Re-elected in 1982. Re-elected in 1984. Re-elected in 1986. Re-elected in 1988. Re-elected in 1990. Redistricted to the at-large district and lost re-election.
District eliminated January 3, 1993
District re-established January 3, 2023
Matt Rosendale (Glendive)	Republican	January 3, 2023 – January 3, 2025	118th	Redistricted from the at-large district and re-elected in 2022. Retired.
Troy Downing (Helena)	Republican	January 3, 2025 – present	119th	Elected in 2024. Re-elected in 2026.

== Recent election results ==
=== 2022 ===
2022 Montana's 2nd congressional district election
Party	Candidate	Votes	%
Republican	Matt Rosendale (incumbent)	120,899	56.6
Independent	Gary Buchanan	46,917	22.0
Democratic	Penny Ronning	42,905	20.1
Libertarian	Sam Rankin	2,975	1.4
Total votes		213,696	100.0
Republican hold			

=== 2024 ===
2024 Montana's 2nd congressional district election
Party	Candidate	Votes	%
Republican	Troy Downing	181,832	65.7
Democratic	John Driscoll	93,713	33.9
Write-in		1,107	0.4
Total votes		276,652	100.0
Republican hold			

== See also ==
- Montana's congressional districts
- List of United States congressional districts
