= Orvin B. Fjare =

American politician

Orvin Fjare
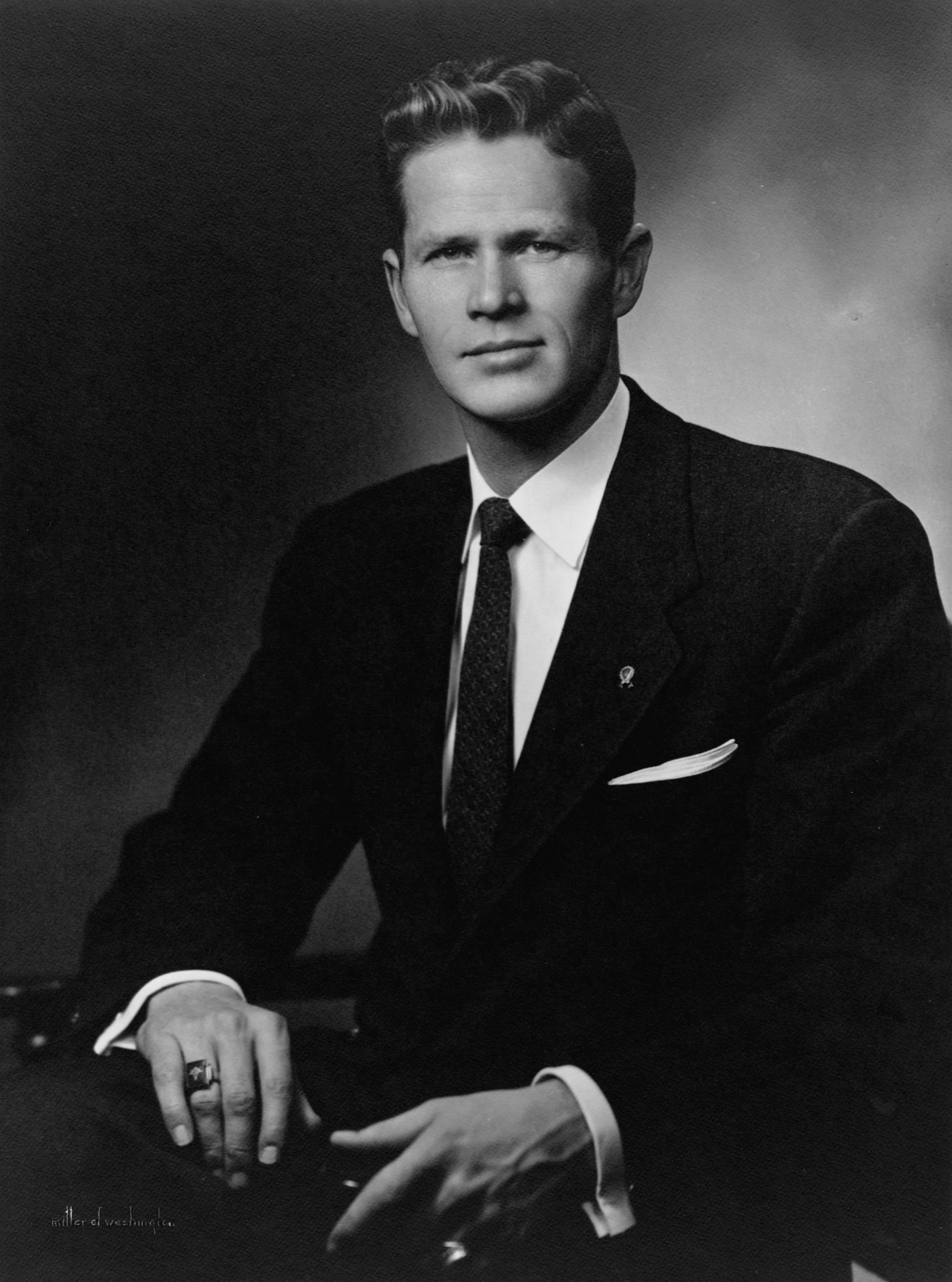
- Official portrait, 1955

Member of the U.S. House of Representatives from Montana's 2nd district
- In office January 3, 1955 – January 3, 1957
- Preceded by: Wesley A. D'Ewart
- Succeeded by: LeRoy H. Anderson

Member of the Montana House of Representatives
- In office 1959

Personal details
- Born: April 16, 1918 near Big Timber, Montana, U.S.
- Died: June 27, 2011 (aged 93) Helena, Montana, U.S.
- Party: Republican

Military service
- Allegiance: United States
- Branch/service: United States Army
- Years of service: 1940–1946
- Rank: Captain
- Battles/wars: World War II

Orvin Benonie Fjare (April 16, 1918 – June 27, 2011) was a U.S. representative from Montana.

Born on a ranch near Big Timber, Montana to Abigael (née Hetland) and Olaf J. B. Fjare, both Norwegian immigrants. Fjare attended public schools. He was employed as a clerk in a clothing store at Big Timber, Montana, and later became part owner. Fjare enlisted as a private in the United States Army in 1940 and was commissioned a second lieutenant of Artillery in 1942. He served as a pilot in the South Pacific and was discharged as a captain in 1946. He served as member of the Montana Public Welfare Commission 1952–1954. He served as member of board of trustees of Big Timber Public Schools 1951–1954.

Fjare was elected as a Republican to the Eighty-fourth Congress (January 3, 1955 – January 3, 1957). He was an unsuccessful candidate for reelection in 1956 to the Eighty-fifth Congress. He served as a member of the Montana House of Representatives in 1959. He engaged in the life insurance business. He was an unsuccessful candidate for election to the United States Senate in 1960. Fjare was the advertising director of the Montana State Highway Department from 1962 to 1969. He served as director of Montana Federal Housing Administration 1970–1979 until he retired in 1979. Up until his death Fjare was a resident of Big Timber, Montana.

Party political offices
Preceded by Wesley A. D'Ewart	Republican nominee for U.S. Senator from Montana (Class 2); 1960	Succeeded by Tim Babcock
U.S. House of Representatives
Preceded by Wesley A. D'Ewart	Member of the U.S. House of Representatives from Montana's 2nd congressional district 1955-1957	Succeeded by LeRoy H. Anderson
