= 2020 Montana House of Representatives election =

- November 3, 2020

All 100 seats in the Montana House of Representatives 51 seats needed for a majority
- Turnout: 75.82%
| | Majority party | Minority party |
|---|---|---|
| Leader | Greg Hertz (term-limited) | Casey Schreiner (term-limited) |
| Party | Republican | Democratic |
| Leader since | January 7, 2019 | January 7, 2019 |
| Leader's seat | 12th – Polson | 26th – Great Falls |
| Last election | 58 | 42 |
| Seats won | 67 | 33 |
| Seat change | ▲9 | ▼9 |
| Popular vote | 338,344 | 224,210 |
| Percentage | 59.30% | 39.30% |
| Swing | ▲3.59% | ▼1.94% |
- Results: Republican gain Republican hold Democratic hold
Speaker before election
Greg Hertz
Republican
Elected Speaker
Wylie Galt
Republican

Elections to the Montana House of Representatives were held on November 3, 2020.

== Predictions ==
| Source | Ranking | As of |
|---|---|---|
| The Cook Political Report | Safe R | October 21, 2020 |

== Results summary ==
| Party | Votes | % | Seats | +/− | % |
|---|---|---|---|---|---|
| Montana Republican Party | 338,344 | 59.30 | 67 | +9 | 67.00 |
| Montana Democratic Party | 224,210 | 39.30 | 33 | −9 | 33.00 |
| Libertarian Party of Montana | 7,993 | 1.40 | 0 | 0 | 0.00 |
| Write-in | 6 | 0.00 | 0 | 0 | 0.00 |
| Total | 570,553 | 100.00 | 100 | ±0 | 100.00 |
| Registered voters | 752,538 | 100.00 | | | |
| Turnout | 570,553 | 75.82 | | | |
Source: Montana Secretary of State

Popular vote
| Republican | 59.30% |
| Democratic | 39.30% |
| Libertarian | 1.40% |

House seats
| Republican | 67.00% |
| Democratic | 33.00% |

=== Incumbents defeated in primary election ===
- David Dunn (R-District 9), defeated by Brian Putnam (R)
- Joel Krautter (R-District 35), defeated by Brandon Ler (R)
- Frederick Moore (R-District 37), defeated by Jerry Schillinger (R)
- Bruce Grubbs (R-District 68), defeated by Caleb Hinkle (R)
- Greg DeVries (R-District 75), defeated by Marta Bertoglio (R)

=== Incumbents defeated in general election ===
- Debo Powers (D-District 3), defeated by Braxton Mitchell (R)
- Brad Hamlett (D-District 23), defeated by Scot Kerns (R)
- Barbara Bessette (D-District 24), defeated by Steven Galloway (R)
- Jasmine Krotkov (D-District 25), defeated by Steve Gist (R)
- Jade Bahr (D-District 50), defeated by Mallerie Stromswold (R)

=== Open seats that changed parties ===
- Casey Schreiner (D-District 26) ran for Lieutenant Governor, seat won by Jeremy Trebas (R)
- Jacob Bachmeier (D-District 28) didn't seek re-election, seat won by Ed Hill (R)
- Gordon Pierson (D-District 78) was term-limited and could not seek re-election, seat won by Gregory Frazer (R)
- Tom Winter (D-District 96) ran for the U.S House, seat won by Kathy Whitman (R)

=== Close races ===
Districts where the margin of victory was under 10%:

1. District 96, 2.62% gain
2. District 23, 2.64% gain
3. District 25, 3.27% gain
4. District 28, 3.68% gain
5. District 48, 5.52%
6. District 50, 5.62% gain
7. District 77, 5.66%
8. District 26, 5.72% gain
9. District 51, 6.44%
10. District 24, 6.9% gain
11. District 94, 6.98%
12. District 84, 7.2%
13. District 83, 8.72%
14. District 78, 8.98% gain

== Detailed results ==
=== Districts 1–20 ===
==== District 1 ====
Incumbent Republican Steve Gunderson has represented the 1st District since 2017.

Montana House of Representatives 1st district general election, 2020
| Party | Candidate | Votes | % |
|---|---|---|---|
| Republican | Steve Gunderson (incumbent) | 3,721 | 71.03% |
| Democratic | Marvin C. Sather | 1,518 | 28.97% |
| Total votes | | 5,239 | 100% |
| Republican hold | | | |

==== District 2 ====
Incumbent Republican Neil Duram has represented the 2nd district since 2019.

Montana House of Representatives 2nd district general election, 2020
| Party | Candidate | Votes | % |
|---|---|---|---|
| Republican | Neil Duram (incumbent) | 5,080 | 80.15% |
| Democratic | Lori Ramesz | 1,258 | 19.85% |
| Total votes | | 6,338 | 100% |
| Republican hold | | | |

==== District 3 ====
Incumbent Democrat Debo Powers has represented the 3rd district since her appointment on November 5, 2019. Powers lost re-election to Republican Braxton Mitchell.

Montana House of Representatives 3rd district general election, 2020
| Party | Candidate | Votes | % |
|---|---|---|---|
| Republican | Braxton Mitchell | 3,586 | 59.98% |
| Democratic | Debo Powers (incumbent) | 2,393 | 40.02% |
| Total votes | | 5,979 | 100% |
| Republican gain from Democratic | | | |

==== District 4 ====
Incumbent Republican Matt Regier has represented the 4th district since 2017.

Montana House of Representatives 4th district general election, 2020
| Party | Candidate | Votes | % |
|---|---|---|---|
| Republican | Matt Regier (incumbent) | 5,922 | 100% |
| Total votes | | 5,922 | 100% |
| Republican hold | | | |

==== District 5 ====
Incumbent Democrat Dave Fern has represented the 5th district since 2017.

Montana House of Representatives 5th district general election, 2020
| Party | Candidate | Votes | % |
|---|---|---|---|
| Democratic | Dave Fern (incumbent) | 4,482 | 60.08% |
| Republican | Catherine Owens | 2,978 | 39.92% |
| Total votes | | 7,460 | 100% |
| Democratic hold | | | |

==== District 6 ====
Incumbent Republican Carl Glimm has represented the 6th district since 2013. Glimm was term-limited and successfully ran for the Montana Senate. Republican Amy Regier won the open seat.

Montana House of Representatives 6th district general election, 2020
| Party | Candidate | Votes | % |
|---|---|---|---|
| Republican | Amy Regier | 5,187 | 69.34% |
| Democratic | Jerramy Dear-Ruel | 2,294 | 30.66% |
| Total votes | | 7,481 | 100% |
| Republican hold | | | |

==== District 7 ====
Incumbent Republican Frank Garner has represented the 7th district since 2015.

Montana House of Representatives 7th district general election, 2020
| Party | Candidate | Votes | % |
|---|---|---|---|
| Republican | Frank Garner (incumbent) | 3,089 | 64.03% |
| Democratic | Ross Frazier | 1,475 | 30.58% |
| Libertarian | Nicholas Ramlow | 260 | 5.39% |
| Total votes | | 4,824 | 100% |
| Republican hold | | | |

==== District 8 ====
Incumbent Republican John Fuller has represented the 8th district since 2019.

Montana House of Representatives 8th district general election, 2020
| Party | Candidate | Votes | % |
|---|---|---|---|
| Republican | John Fuller (incumbent) | 5,108 | 100% |
| Total votes | | 5,108 | 100% |
| Republican hold | | | |

==== District 9 ====
Incumbent Republican David Dunn has represented the 9th district since 2019. Dunn lost re-nomination to fellow Republican Brian Putnam. Putnam won the general election.

Montana House of representatives 9th district general election, 2020
| Party | Candidate | Votes | % |
|---|---|---|---|
| Republican | Brian Putnam | 4,142 | 100% |
| Total votes | | 4,142 | 100% |
| Republican hold | | | |

==== District 10 ====
Incumbent Republican Mark Noland has represented the 10th district since 2015.

Montana House of Representatives 10th district general election, 2020
| Party | Candidate | Votes | % |
|---|---|---|---|
| Republican | Mark Noland (incumbent) | 5,371 | 71.15% |
| Democratic | Jennifer Allen | 2,178 | 28.85% |
| Total votes | | 7,549 | 100% |
| Republican hold | | | |

==== District 11 ====
Incumbent Republican Derek Skees has represented the 11th district since 2017.

Montana House of Representatives 11th district general election, 2020
| Party | Candidate | Votes | % |
|---|---|---|---|
| Republican | Derek Skees (incumbent) | 5,358 | 100% |
| Total votes | | 5,358 | 100% |
| Republican hold | | | |

==== District 12 ====
Incumbent Republican House Speaker Greg Hertz has represented the 12th district since 2015. Hertz ran successfully for the Montana Senate and fellow Republican Linda Reksten won the open seat.

Montana House of Representatives 12th district general election, 2020
| Party | Candidate | Votes | % |
|---|---|---|---|
| Republican | Linda Reksten | 3,739 | 56.92% |
| Democratic | Gerry Browning | 2,830 | 43.08% |
| Total votes | | 6,569 | 100% |
| Republican hold | | | |

==== District 13 ====
Incumbent Republican Bob Brown has represented the 13th district since 2015. Brown ran for the Montana Senate and fellow Republican Paul Fielder won the open seat.

Montana House of Representatives 13th district general election, 2020
| Party | Candidate | Votes | % |
|---|---|---|---|
| Republican | Paul Fielder | 4,792 | 71.16% |
| Democratic | Colleen Hinds | 1,449 | 21.52% |
| Libertarian | Cade Stiles | 493 | 7.32% |
| Total votes | | 6,734 | 100% |
| Republican hold | | | |

==== District 14 ====
Incumbent Republican Denley Loge has represented the 14th district since 2017.

Montana House of Representatives 14th district general election, 2020
| Party | Candidate | Votes | % |
|---|---|---|---|
| Republican | Denley Loge (incumbent) | 5,185 | 99.94% |
| Independent | Mark T. French (write-in) | 3 | 0.06% |
| Total votes | | 5,188 | 100% |
| Republican hold | | | |

==== District 15 ====
Incumbent Democrat Marvin Weatherwax Jr. has represented the 15th district since 2019.

Montana House of Representatives 15th district general election, 2020
| Party | Candidate | Votes | % |
|---|---|---|---|
| Democratic | Marvin Weatherwax Jr. (incumbent) | 2,908 | 100% |
| Total votes | | 2,908 | 100% |
| Democratic hold | | | |

==== District 16 ====
Incumbent Democrat Tyson Runningwolf has represented the 16th district since 2019.

Montana House of Representatives 16th district general election, 2020
| Party | Candidate | Votes | % |
|---|---|---|---|
| Democratic | Tyson Runningwolf (incumbent) | 3,237 | 100% |
| Total votes | | 3,237 | 100% |
| Democratic hold | | | |

==== District 17 ====
Incumbent Republican Ross Fitzgerald has represented the 17th district since 2017.

Montana House of Representatives 17th district general election, 2020
| Party | Candidate | Votes | % |
|---|---|---|---|
| Republican | Ross Fitzgerald (incumbent) | 4,452 | 78.50% |
| Democratic | Barnett G. Sporkin-Morrison | 1,219 | 21.50% |
| Total votes | | 5,671 | 100% |
| Republican hold | | | |

==== District 18 ====
Incumbent Republican Llew Jones has represented the 18th district since 2019.

Montana House of Representatives 18th district general election, 2020
| Party | Candidate | Votes | % |
|---|---|---|---|
| Republican | Llew Jones (incumbent) | 3,844 | 100% |
| Total votes | | 3,844 | 100% |
| Republican hold | | | |

==== District 19 ====
Incumbent Republican Wendy McKamey has represented the 19th district since 2017.

Montana House of Representatives 19th district general election, 2020
| Party | Candidate | Votes | % |
|---|---|---|---|
| Republican | Wendy McKamey (incumbent) | 4,288 | 84.91% |
| Libertarian | George Anthony Schultz | 762 | 15.09% |
| Total votes | | 5,050 | 100% |
| Republican hold | | | |

==== District 20 ====
Incumbent Republican Fred Anderson has represented the 20th district since 2017.

Montana House of representatives 20th district general election, 2020
| Party | Candidate | Votes | % |
|---|---|---|---|
| Republican | Fred Anderson (incumbent) | 4,357 | 67.71% |
| Democratic | Melissa Smith | 2,078 | 32.29% |
| Total votes | | 6,435 | 100% |
| Republican hold | | | |

=== Districts 21–40 ===
==== District 21 ====
Incumbent Republican Ed Buttrey has represented the 21st district since 2019.

Montana House of Representatives 21st district general election, 2020
| Party | Candidate | Votes | % |
|---|---|---|---|
| Republican | Ed Buttrey (incumbent) | 3,390 | 65.72% |
| Democratic | Jaime A. Horn | 1,768 | 34.28% |
| Total votes | | 5,158 | 100% |
| Republican hold | | | |

==== District 22 ====
Incumbent Republican Lola Sheldon-Galloway has represented the 22nd district since 2017.

Montana House of Representatives 22nd district general election, 2020
| Party | Candidate | Votes | % |
|---|---|---|---|
| Republican | Lola Sheldon-Galloway (incumbent) | 2,572 | 58.30% |
| Democratic | Jasmine Taylor | 1,840 | 41.70% |
| Total votes | | 4,412 | 100% |
| Republican hold | | | |

==== District 23 ====
Incumbent Democrat Brad Hamlett has represented the 23rd district since 2017. He lost re-election to Republican Scot Kerns.

Montana House of Representatives 23rd district general election, 2020
| Party | Candidate | Votes | % |
|---|---|---|---|
| Republican | Scot Kerns | 2,079 | 51.32% |
| Democratic | Brad Hamlett (incumbent) | 1,972 | 48.68% |
| Total votes | | 4,051 | 100% |
| Republican gain from Democratic | | | |

==== District 24 ====
Incumbent Democrat Barbara Bessette has represented the 24th district since 2019. Bessette lost re-election to Republican Steven Galloway.

Montana House of Representatives 24th district general election, 2020
| Party | Candidate | Votes | % |
|---|---|---|---|
| Republican | Steven Galloway | 2,363 | 53.45% |
| Democratic | Barbara Bessette (incumbent) | 2,058 | 46.55% |
| Total votes | | 4,421 | 100% |
| Republican gain from Democratic | | | |

==== District 25 ====
Incumbent Democrat Jasmine Krotkov has represented the 25th district since 2019. Krotkov lost re-election to Republican Steve Gist.

Montana House of Representatives 25th district general election, 2020
| Party | Candidate | Votes | % |
|---|---|---|---|
| Republican | Steve Gist | 2,287 | 52.88% |
| Democratic | Jasmine Krotkov (incumbent) | 2,038 | 47.12% |
| Total votes | | 4,325 | 100% |
| Republican gain from Democratic | | | |

==== District 26 ====
Incumbent Democrat Casey Schreiner has represented the 26th district since 2013. Schreiner was term-limited and ran for Lieutenant Governor. Former Republican 25th district representative Jeremy Trebas won the open seat.

Montana House of Representatives 26th district general election, 2020
| Party | Candidate | Votes | % |
|---|---|---|---|
| Republican | Jeremy Trebas | 1,689 | 52.86% |
| Democratic | Helena Lovick | 1,506 | 47.14% |
| Total votes | | 3,195 | 100% |
| Republican gain from Democratic | | | |

==== District 27 ====
Incumbent Republican Joshua Kassmier has represented the 27th district since 2019.

Montana House of Representatives 27th district general election, 2020
| Party | Candidate | Votes | % |
|---|---|---|---|
| Republican | Joshua Kassmier (incumbent) | 4,911 | 100% |
| Total votes | | 4,911 | 100% |
| Republican hold | | | |

==== District 28 ====
Incumbent Democrat Jacob Bachmeier has represented the 28th district since 2017. Bachmeier didn't seek re-election and Republican Ed Hill won the open seat.

Montana House of Representatives district general election, 2020
| Party | Candidate | Votes | % |
|---|---|---|---|
| Republican | Ed Hill | 2,296 | 51.84% |
| Democratic | Krystal Steinmetz | 2,133 | 48.16% |
| Total votes | | 4,429 | 100% |
| Republican gain from Democratic | | | |

==== District 29 ====
Incumbent Republican Dan Bartel has represented the 29th district since 2017.

Montana House of Representatives 29th district general election, 2020
| Party | Candidate | Votes | % |
|---|---|---|---|
| Republican | Dan Bartel (incumbent) | 4,761 | 100% |
| Total votes | | 4,761 | 100% |
| Republican hold | | | |

==== District 30 ====
Incumbent Republican Speaker pro tempore Wylie Galt has represented the 30th district since 2017.

Montana House of Representatives 30th district general election, 2020
| Party | Candidate | Votes | % |
|---|---|---|---|
| Republican | Wylie Galt (incumbent) | 4,559 | 79.67% |
| Democratic | Cindy Palmer | 1,163 | 20.33% |
| Total votes | | 5,722 | 100% |
| Republican hold | | | |

==== District 31 ====
Incumbent Democrat Bridget Smith has represented the 31st district since 2013. Smith was term-limited and instead ran for the Montana Senate. State Senator and former representative Frank Smith won the open seat.

Montana House of Representatives 31st district general election, 2020
| Party | Candidate | Votes | % |
|---|---|---|---|
| Democratic | Frank Smith | 2,820 | 100% |
| Total votes | | 2,820 | 100% |
| Democratic hold | | | |

==== District 32 ====
Incumbent Democrat Jonathan Windy Boy has represented the 32nd district since 2017.

Montana House of Representatives district general election, 2020
| Party | Candidate | Votes | % |
|---|---|---|---|
| Democratic | Jonathan Windy Boy (incumbent) | 2,244 | 57.32% |
| Republican | G. Bruce Meyers | 1,671 | 42.68% |
| Total votes | | 3,915 | 100% |
| Democratic hold | | | |

==== District 33 ====
Incumbent Republican Casey Knudsen has represented the 33rd district since 2017.

Montana House of Representatives 33rd district general election, 2020
| Party | Candidate | Votes | % |
|---|---|---|---|
| Republican | Casey Knudsen (incumbent) | 4,346 | 100% |
| Total votes | | 4,346 | 100% |
| Republican hold | | | |

==== District 34 ====
Incumbent Republican Rhonda Knudsen has represented the 34th district since 2019.

Montana House of Representatives 34th district general election, 2020
| Party | Candidate | Votes | % |
|---|---|---|---|
| Republican | Rhonda Knudsen (incumbent) | 4,914 | 100% |
| Total votes | | 4,914 | 100% |
| Republican hold | | | |

==== District 35 ====
Incumbent Republican Joel Krautter has represented the 35th district since 2019. Krautter lost re-nomination to fellow Republican Brandon Ler. Ler won the general election unopposed.

Montana House of Representatives 35th district general election, 2020
| Party | Candidate | Votes | % |
|---|---|---|---|
| Republican | Brandon Ler | 4,760 | 100% |
| Total votes | | 4,760 | 100% |
| Republican hold | | | |

==== District 36 ====
Incumbent Republican Alan Doane has represented the 36th district since 2013. Doane was term-limited and could not seek re-election. Republican Bob Phalen won the open seat unopposed.

Montana House of Representatives 36th district general election, 2020
| Party | Candidate | Votes | % |
|---|---|---|---|
| Republican | Bob Phalen | 4,728 | 100% |
| Total votes | | 4,728 | 100% |
| Republican hold | | | |

==== District 37 ====
Incumbent Republican Fredrick Moore has represented the 37th district since 2019. Moore lost re-nomination to fellow Republican Jerry Schillinger. Schillinger won the general election.

Montana House of Representatives 37th district general election, 2020
| Party | Candidate | Votes | % |
|---|---|---|---|
| Republican | Jerry Schillinger | 5,457 | 90.05% |
| Libertarian | Jacob Kitson | 603 | 9.95% |
| Total votes | | 6,060 | 100% |
| Republican hold | | | |

==== District 38 ====
Incumbent Republican Kenneth Holmlund has represented the 38th district since 2015.

Montana House of Representatives 38th district general election, 2020
| Party | Candidate | Votes | % |
|---|---|---|---|
| Republican | Kenneth Holmlund (incumbent) | 4,006 | 100% |
| Total votes | | 4,006 | 100% |
| Republican hold | | | |

==== District 39 ====
Incumbent Republican Geraldine Custer has represented the 39th district since 2015.

Montana House of Representatives 39th district general election, 2020
| Party | Candidate | Votes | % |
|---|---|---|---|
| Republican | Geraldine Custer (incumbent) | 4,940 | 100% |
| Total votes | | 4,940 | 100% |
| Republican hold | | | |

==== District 40 ====
Incumbent Republican Barry Usher has represented the 40th district since 2017.

Montana House of Representatives 40th district general election, 2020
| Party | Candidate | Votes | % |
|---|---|---|---|
| Republican | Barry Usher (incumbent) | 4,783 | 81.03% |
| Democratic | Kris Spanjian | 1,120 | 18.97% |
| Total votes | | 5,903 | 100% |
| Republican hold | | | |

=== Districts 41–60 ===
==== District 41 ====
Incumbent Democrat Rae Peppers has represented the 41st district since 2013. Peppers was term-limited and could not seek re-election. Fellow Democrat Rynalea Whiteman Pena won the open seat.

Montana House of Representatives 41st district general election, 2020
| Party | Candidate | Votes | % |
|---|---|---|---|
| Democratic | Rynalea Whiteman Pena | 1,829 | 99.84% |
| Independent | Kristina Marie Redbird-Quaempts (write-in) | 3 | 0.16% |
| Total votes | | 1,832 | 100% |
| Democratic hold | | | |

==== District 42 ====
Incumbent Democrat Sharon Stewart-Peregoy has represented the 42nd district since 2017.

Montana House of Representatives 42nd district general election, 2020
| Party | Candidate | Votes | % |
|---|---|---|---|
| Democratic | Sharon Stewart-Peregoy (incumbent) | 2,778 | 100% |
| Total votes | | 2,778 | 100% |
| Democratic hold | | | |

==== District 43 ====
Incumbent Republican Peggy Webb has represented the 43rd district since 2017. Webb didn't seek re-election and Republican Kerri Seekins-Crowe won the open seat.

Montana House of Representatives 43rd district general election, 2020
| Party | Candidate | Votes | % |
|---|---|---|---|
| Republican | Kerri Seekins-Crowe | 3,553 | 70.37% |
| Libertarian | Melody Benes | 1,496 | 29.63% |
| Total votes | | 5,049 | 100% |
| Republican hold | | | |

==== District 44 ====
Incumbent Republican Larry Brewster has represented the 44th district since his appointment on March 24, 2020. Brewster was elected to a full term.

Montana House of Representatives 44th district general election, 2020
| Party | Candidate | Votes | % |
|---|---|---|---|
| Republican | Larry Brewster (incumbent) | 3,288 | 64.31% |
| Democratic | Terry Dennis | 1,825 | 35.69% |
| Total votes | | 5,113 | 100% |
| Republican hold | | | |

==== District 45 ====
Incumbent Republican Daniel Zolnikov has represented the 45th district since 2013. Zolnikov was term-limited and could not seek re-election. His wife, Katie Zolnikov won the open seat.

Montana House of Representatives 45th district general election, 2020
| Party | Candidate | Votes | % |
|---|---|---|---|
| Republican | Katie Zolnikov | 4,996 | 100% |
| Total votes | | 4,996 | 100% |
| Republican hold | | | |

==== District 46 ====
Incumbent Republican Bill Mercer has represented the 46th district since 2019.

Montana House of Representatives 46th district general election, 2020
| Party | Candidate | Votes | % |
|---|---|---|---|
| Republican | Bill Mercer (incumbent) | 4,265 | 67.74% |
| Democratic | Zach Ladson | 2,031 | 32.26% |
| Total votes | | 6,296 | 100% |
| Republican hold | | | |

==== District 47 ====
Incumbent Democrat Katharin Kelker has represented the 47th district since 2015.

Montana House of Representatives 47th district general election, 2020
| Party | Candidate | Votes | % |
|---|---|---|---|
| Democratic | Katharin Kelker (incumbent) | 2,485 | 55.51% |
| Republican | TJ Smith | 1,992 | 44.49% |
| Total votes | | 4,477 | 100% |
| Democratic hold | | | |

==== District 48 ====
Incumbent Democrat Jessica Karjala has represented the 48th district since 2015.

Montana House of Representatives 48th district general election, 2020
| Party | Candidate | Votes | % |
|---|---|---|---|
| Democratic | Jessica Karjala (incumbent) | 2,697 | 52.76% |
| Republican | Leigh Verrill-Rhys | 2,415 | 47.24% |
| Total votes | | 5,112 | 100% |
| Democratic hold | | | |

==== District 49 ====
Incumbent Democrat Emma Kerr-Carpenter has represented the 49th district since 2018.

Montana House of Representatives 49th district general election, 2020
| Party | Candidate | Votes | % |
|---|---|---|---|
| Democratic | Emma Kerr-Carpenter (incumbent) | 2,183 | 57.06% |
| Republican | Colin Michael Nygaard | 1,643 | 42.94% |
| Total votes | | 3,826 | 100% |
| Democratic hold | | | |

==== District 50 ====
Incumbent Democrat Jade Bahr has represented the 50th district since 2019. Bahr lost re-election to Republican Mallerie Stromswold.

Montana House of Representatives 50th district general election, 2020
| Party | Candidate | Votes | % |
|---|---|---|---|
| Republican | Mallerie Stromswold | 2,229 | 52.81% |
| Democratic | Jade Bahr (incumbent) | 1,992 | 47.19% |
| Total votes | | 4,221 | 100% |
| Republican gain from Democratic | | | |

==== District 51 ====
Incumbent Republican Frank Fleming has represented the 51st district since 2018.

Montana House of Representatives 51st district general election, 2020
| Party | Candidate | Votes | % |
|---|---|---|---|
| Republican | Frank Fleming (incumbent) | 2,638 | 53.22% |
| Democratic | Anne Giuliano | 2,319 | 46.78% |
| Total votes | | 4,957 | 100% |
| Republican hold | | | |

==== District 52 ====
Incumbent Republican Rodney Garcia has represented the 52nd district since 2019. Garcia ran for the Montana Senate and fellow Republican Jimmy Patelis won the open seat.

Montana House of Representatives 52nd district general election, 2020
| Party | Candidate | Votes | % |
|---|---|---|---|
| Republican | Jimmy Patelis | 2,341 | 56.02% |
| Democratic | Hannah Olson | 1,838 | 43.98% |
| Total votes | | 4,179 | 100% |
| Republican hold | | | |

==== District 53 ====
Incumbent Republican Dennis Lenz has represented the 53rd district since 2017.

Montana House of Representatives 53rd district general election, 2020
| Party | Candidate | Votes | % |
|---|---|---|---|
| Republican | Dennis Lenz (incumbent) | 8,025 | 100% |
| Total votes | | 8,025 | 100% |
| Republican hold | | | |

==== District 54 ====
Incumbent Republican Terry Moore has represented the 54th district since 2019.

Montana House of Representatives 54th district general election, 2020
| Party | Candidate | Votes | % |
|---|---|---|---|
| Republican | Terry Moore (incumbent) | 4,459 | 66.57% |
| Democratic | Ryan Thomsen | 2,239 | 33.43% |
| Total votes | | 6,698 | 100% |
| Republican hold | | | |

==== District 55 ====
Incumbent Republican Vince Ricci has represented the 55th district since 2015.

Montana House of Representatives 55th district general election, 2020
| Party | Candidate | Votes | % |
|---|---|---|---|
| Republican | Vince Ricci (incumbent) | 4,473 | 100% |
| Total votes | | 4,473 | 100% |
| Republican hold | | | |

==== District 56 ====
Incumbent Republican Sue Vinton has represented the 56th district since 2017.

Montana House of Representatives 56th district general election, 2020
| Party | Candidate | Votes | % |
|---|---|---|---|
| Republican | Sue Vinton (incumbent) | 4,444 | 100% |
| Total votes | | 4,444 | 100% |
| Republican hold | | | |

==== District 57 ====
Incumbent Republican Forrest Mandeville has represented the 57th district since 2015. Mandeville ran for Secretary of State and fellow Republican Fiona Nave won the open seat.

Montana House of Representatives 57th district general election, 2020
| Party | Candidate | Votes | % |
|---|---|---|---|
| Republican | Fiona Nave | 5,104 | 100% |
| Total votes | | 5,104 | 100% |
| Republican hold | | | |

==== District 58 ====
Incumbent Republican Seth Berglee has represented the 58th district since 2015.

Montana House of Representatives 58th district general election, 2020
| Party | Candidate | Votes | % |
|---|---|---|---|
| Republican | Seth Berglee (incumbent) | 4,587 | 65.63% |
| Democratic | Elizabeth “Betsy” Scanlin | 2,402 | 34.37% |
| Total votes | | 6,989 | 100% |
| Republican hold | | | |

==== District 59 ====
Incumbent Republican Alan Redfield has represented the 59th district since 2013. Redfield was term-limited and could not seek re-election. Republican Marty Malone won the open seat.

Montana House of Representatives 59th district general election, 2020
| Party | Candidate | Votes | % |
|---|---|---|---|
| Republican | Marty Malone | 4,594 | 64.63% |
| Democratic | Dan Vermillion | 2,514 | 35.37% |
| Total votes | | 7,108 | 100% |
| Republican hold | | | |

==== District 60 ====
Incumbent Democrat Laurie Bishop has represented the 60th district since 2017.

Montana House of Representatives 60th district general election, 2020
| Party | Candidate | Votes | % |
|---|---|---|---|
| Democratic | Laurie Bishop (incumbent) | 3,776 | 56.33% |
| Republican | Joe Lamm | 2,927 | 43.67% |
| Total votes | | 6,703 | 100% |
| Democratic hold | | | |

=== Districts 61–80 ===
==== District 61 ====
Incumbent Democrat Jim Hamilton has represented the 61st district and its predecessors since 2017.

Montana House of Representatives 61st district general election, 2020
| Party | Candidate | Votes | % |
|---|---|---|---|
| Democratic | Jim Hamilton (incumbent) | 6,200 | 100% |
| Total votes | | 6,200 | 100% |
| Democratic hold | | | |

==== District 62 ====
Incumbent Democrat Tom Woods has represented the 62nd district since 2013. Woods was term-limited and ran for the Montana Public Service Commission. Democrat Ed Stafman won the open seat.

Montana House of Representatives 62nd district general election, 2020
| Party | Candidate | Votes | % |
|---|---|---|---|
| Democratic | Ed Stafman | 5,924 | 74.02% |
| Libertarian | Francis Wendt | 2,079 | 25.98% |
| Total votes | | 8,003 | 100% |
| Democratic hold | | | |

==== District 63 ====
Incumbent Democrat Zach Brown has represented the 63rd district since 2015. Brown ran successfully for the Gallatin County Commission and fellow Democrat Alice Buckley won the open seat.

Montana House of Representatives 63rd district general election, 2020
| Party | Candidate | Votes | % |
|---|---|---|---|
| Democratic | Alice Buckley | 3,602 | 60.90% |
| Republican | Bryan Donald Haysom | 2,312 | 39.09% |
| Total votes | | 5,914 | 100% |
| Democratic hold | | | |

==== District 64 ====
Incumbent Republican Kerry White has represented the 64th District since 2013. White was term-limited and could not seek re-election. Republican Jane Gillette won the open seat.

Montana House of Representatives 64th district general election, 2020
| Party | Candidate | Votes | % |
|---|---|---|---|
| Republican | Jane Gillette | 4,578 | 52.99% |
| Democratic | Brian Gabriel Popiel | 3,611 | 41.80% |
| Libertarian | Doug Campbell | 450 | 5.21% |
| Total votes | | 8,639 | 100% |
| Republican hold | | | |

==== District 65 ====
Incumbent Democrat Christopher Pope has represented the 65th district since 2019. Pope ran for the Montana Senate and fellow Democrat Kelly Kortum won the open seat.

Montana House of Representatives 65th district general election, 2020
| Party | Candidate | Votes | % |
|---|---|---|---|
| Democratic | Kelly Kortum | 5,906 | 60.64% |
| Republican | Jolene Crum | 3,834 | 39.36% |
| Total votes | | 9,740 | 100% |
| Democratic hold | | | |

==== District 66 ====
Incumbent Democrat Denise Hayman has represented the 66th District since 2015.

Montana House of Representatives 66th district general election, 2020
| Party | Candidate | Votes | % |
|---|---|---|---|
| Democratic | Denise Hayman (incumbent) | 5,321 | 100% |
| Total votes | | 5,321 | 100% |
| Democratic hold | | | |

==== District 67 ====
Incumbent Republican Tom Burnett has represented the 67th District since 2015. Burnett didn't seek re-election and fellow Republican Jedediah Hinkle won the open seat.

Montana House of Representatives 67th district general election, 2020
| Party | Candidate | Votes | % |
|---|---|---|---|
| Republican | Jedediah Hinkle | 4,154 | 59.37% |
| Democratic | Colette K. Campbell | 2,480 | 35.44% |
| Libertarian | Andrew Schaefer | 363 | 5.19% |
| Total votes | | 6,997 | 100% |
| Republican hold | | | |

==== District 68 ====
Incumbent Republican Bruce Grubbs has represented the 68th District since 2017. Gubbs lost re-nomination to fellow Republican Caleb Hinkle. Hinkle won the general election.

Montana House of Representatives 68th district general election, 2020
| Party | Candidate | Votes | % |
|---|---|---|---|
| Republican | Caleb Hinkle | 4,293 | 66.65% |
| Democratic | Emily Brosten | 2,148 | 33.35% |
| Total votes | | 6,441 | 100% |
| Republican hold | | | |

==== District 69 ====
Incumbent Republican Walt Sales has represented the 69th District since 2017. Sales ran successfully for the Montana Senate and fellow Republican Jennifer Carlson won the open seat.

Montana House of Representatives 69th district general election, 2020
| Party | Candidate | Votes | % |
|---|---|---|---|
| Republican | Jennifer Carlson | 5,801 | 100% |
| Total votes | | 5,801 | 100% |
| Republican hold | | | |

==== District 70 ====
Incumbent Republican Julie Dooling has represented the 70th District since 2019.

Montana House of Representatives 70th district general election, 2020
| Party | Candidate | Votes | % |
|---|---|---|---|
| Republican | Julie Dooling (incumbent) | 6,527 | 100% |
| Total votes | | 6,527 | 100% |
| Republican hold | | | |

==== District 71 ====
Incumbent Republican Ray Shaw has represented the 71st District since 2013. Shaw was term-limited and could not seek re-election. Republican Kenneth Walsh won the open seat.

Montana House of Representatives 71st district general election, 2020
| Party | Candidate | Votes | % |
|---|---|---|---|
| Republican | Kenneth Walsh | 5,653 | 74.40% |
| Democratic | Ian Root | 1,945 | 25.60% |
| Total votes | | 7,598 | 100% |
| Republican hold | | | |

==== District 72 ====
Incumbent Republican Tom Welch has represented the 72nd District since 2017.

Montana House of Representatives 72nd district general election, 2020
| Party | Candidate | Votes | % |
|---|---|---|---|
| Republican | Tom Welch (incumbent) | 5,488 | 100% |
| Total votes | | 5,488 | 100% |
| Republican hold | | | |

==== District 73 ====
Incumbent Democrat Jim Keane has represented the 73rd District since 2017.

Montana House of Representatives 73rd district general election, 2020
| Party | Candidate | Votes | % |
|---|---|---|---|
| Democratic | Jim Keane (incumbent) | 3,043 | 60.71% |
| Republican | Marjory McCaffery | 1,969 | 39.29% |
| Total votes | | 5,012 | 100% |
| Democratic hold | | | |

==== District 74 ====
Incumbent Democrat Derek Harvey has represented the 74th District since 2019.

Montana House of Representatives 74th district general election, 2020
| Party | Candidate | Votes | % |
|---|---|---|---|
| Democratic | Derek Harvey (incumbent) | 2,861 | 64.57% |
| Republican | Jim Kephart | 1,570 | 35.43% |
| Total votes | | 4,431 | 100% |
| Democratic hold | | | |

==== District 75 ====
Incumbent Republican Greg DeVries has represented the 75th District since 2019. DeVries lost re-nomination to fellow Republican Marta Bertoglio. Bertoglio won the general election.

Montana House of Representatives 75th district general election, 2020
| Party | Candidate | Votes | % |
|---|---|---|---|
| Republican | Marta Bertoglio | 4,729 | 68.38% |
| Democratic | Bryher Herak | 2,187 | 31.62% |
| Total votes | | 6,916 | 100% |
| Republican hold | | | |

==== District 76 ====
Incumbent Democrat Ryan Lynch has represented the 76th district since 2013. Lynch was term-limited and he ran successfully for the Montana Senate. Democrat Donavon Hawk won the open seat.

Montana House of Representatives 76th district general election, 2020
| Party | Candidate | Votes | % |
|---|---|---|---|
| Democratic | Donavon Hawk | 3,843 | 61.66% |
| Republican | Andy Johnson | 2,390 | 38.34% |
| Total votes | | 6,233 | 100% |
| Democratic hold | | | |

==== District 77 ====
Incumbent Democrat Mark Sweeney has represented the 79th district since 2019. Sweeney ran successfully for the Montana Senate and Democrat Sara Novak won the open seat.

Montana House of Representatives 77th district general election, 2020
| Party | Candidate | Votes | % |
|---|---|---|---|
| Democratic | Sara Novak | 3,057 | 52.83% |
| Republican | Heather Blom | 2,730 | 47.17% |
| Total votes | | 5,787 | 100% |
| Democratic hold | | | |

==== District 78 ====
Incumbent Democrat Gordon Pierson has represented the 78th District and its predecessors since 2013. Pierson was term-limited and could not seek re-election. Republican Gregory Frazer won the open seat.

Montana House of Representatives 78th district general election, 2020
| Party | Candidate | Votes | % |
|---|---|---|---|
| Republican | Gregory Frazer | 2,231 | 54.49% |
| Democratic | Cindy Hiner | 1,863 | 45.51% |
| Total votes | | 4,094 | 100% |
| Republican gain from Democratic | | | |

==== District 79 ====
Incumbent Democrat Robert Farris-Olsen has represented the 79th district since 2019.

Montana House of Representatives 79th district general election, 2020
| Party | Candidate | Votes | % |
|---|---|---|---|
| Democratic | Robert Farris-Olsen (incumbent) | 3,749 | 55.50% |
| Republican | Dennison J. Rivera | 3,006 | 44.50% |
| Total votes | | 6,755 | 100% |
| Democratic hold | | | |

==== District 80 ====
Incumbent Republican Becky Beard has represented the 80th District since 2017.

Montana House of Representatives 80th district general election, 2020
| Party | Candidate | Votes | % |
|---|---|---|---|
| Republican | Becky Beard (incumbent) | 5,733 | 82.87% |
| Libertarian | Ron Vandevender | 1,185 | 17.13% |
| Total votes | | 6,918 | 100% |
| Republican hold | | | |

=== Districts 81–100 ===
==== District 81 ====
Incumbent Democrat Mary Caferro has represented the 81st District since 2019.

Montana House of Representatives 81st district general election, 2020
| Party | Candidate | Votes | % |
|---|---|---|---|
| Democratic | Mary Caferro (incumbent) | 3,478 | 55.61% |
| Republican | Bob Leach | 2,776 | 44.39% |
| Total votes | | 6,254 | 100% |
| Democratic hold | | | |

==== District 82 ====
Incumbent Democrat Moffie Funk has represented the 82nd district since 2015.

Montana House of Representatives 82nd district general election, 2020
| Party | Candidate | Votes | % |
|---|---|---|---|
| Democratic | Moffie Funk (incumbent) | 3,446 | 55.91% |
| Republican | Debbie Westlake | 2,717 | 44.09% |
| Total votes | | 6,163 | 100% |
| Democratic hold | | | |

==== District 83 ====
Incumbent Democrat Kim Abbott has represented the 83rd district since 2017.

Montana House of Representatives 83rd district general election, 2020
| Party | Candidate | Votes | % |
|---|---|---|---|
| Democratic | Kim Abbott (incumbent) | 3,021 | 54.36% |
| Republican | Darin L.Gaub | 2,536 | 45.64% |
| Total votes | | 5,557 | 100% |
| Democratic hold | | | |

==== District 84 ====
Incumbent Democrat Mary Ann Dunwell has represented the 84th District since 2015.

Montana House of Representatives 84th district general election, 2020
| Party | Candidate | Votes | % |
|---|---|---|---|
| Democratic | Mary Ann Dunwell (incumbent) | 3,256 | 53.60% |
| Republican | Charlie Hull | 2,819 | 46.40% |
| Total votes | | 6,075 | 100% |
| Democratic hold | | | |

==== District 85 ====
Incumbent Republican Theresa Manzella has represented the 85th District since 2015. Manzella ran for the Montana Senate and Republican Michele Binkley won the open seat.

Montana House of Representatives 85th district general election, 2020
| Party | Candidate | Votes | % |
|---|---|---|---|
| Republican | Michele Binkley | 5,303 | 74.47% |
| Democratic | Laura Jackson | 1,818 | 25.53% |
| Total votes | | 7,121 | 100% |
| Republican hold | | | |

==== District 86 ====
Incumbent Republican David Bedey has represented the 86th District since 2019.

Montana House of Representatives 86th district general election, 2020
| Party | Candidate | Votes | % |
|---|---|---|---|
| Republican | David Bedey (incumbent) | 5,067 | 100% |
| Total votes | | 5,067 | 100% |
| Republican hold | | | |

==== District 87 ====
Incumbent Republican Nancy Ballance has represented the 87th District since 2013. Ballance was term-limited and she ran unsuccessfully for the Montana Senate. Republican Ron Marshall won the open seat.

Montana House of Representatives 87th district general election, 2020
| Party | Candidate | Votes | % |
|---|---|---|---|
| Republican | Ron Marshall | 5,029 | 72.16% |
| Democratic | Laura Merrill | 1,940 | 27.84% |
| Total votes | | 6,969 | 100% |
| Republican hold | | | |

==== District 88 ====
Incumbent Republican Sharon Greef has represented the 88th District since 2019.

Montana House of Representatives 88th district general election, 2020
| Party | Candidate | Votes | % |
|---|---|---|---|
| Republican | Sharon Greef (incumbent) | 5,587 | 100% |
| Total votes | | 5,587 | 100% |
| Republican hold | | | |

==== District 89 ====
Incumbent Democrat Katie Sullivan has represented the 89th District since 2019.

Montana House of Representatives 89th district general election, 2020
| Party | Candidate | Votes | % |
|---|---|---|---|
| Democratic | Katie Sullivan (incumbent) | 3,374 | 60.08% |
| Republican | Gary D. Wanberg | 2,242 | 39.92% |
| Total votes | | 5,616 | 100% |
| Democratic hold | | | |

==== District 90 ====
Incumbent Democrat Marilyn Marler has represented the 90th District since 2019.

Montana House of Representatives 90th district general election, 2020
| Party | Candidate | Votes | % |
|---|---|---|---|
| Democratic | Marilyn Marler (incumbent) | 4,018 | 68.28% |
| Republican | Lana Hamilton | 1,867 | 31.72% |
| Total votes | | 5,885 | 100% |
| Democratic hold | | | |

==== District 91 ====
Incumbent Democrat Connie Keogh has represented the 91st District since 2019.

Montana House of Representatives 91st district general election, 2020
| Party | Candidate | Votes | % |
|---|---|---|---|
| Democratic | Connie Keogh (incumbent) | 5,651 | 82.65% |
| Republican | Bethanie Calvert Wanberg | 1,186 | 17.35% |
| Total votes | | 6,837 | 100% |
| Democratic hold | | | |

==== District 92 ====
Incumbent Republican Mike Hopkins has represented the 92nd District since 2017.

Montana House of Representatives 92nd district general election, 2020
| Party | Candidate | Votes | % |
|---|---|---|---|
| Republican | Mike Hopkins (incumbent) | 3,249 | 55.36% |
| Democratic | Tom Browder | 2,620 | 44.64% |
| Total votes | | 5,869 | 100% |
| Republican hold | | | |

==== District 93 ====
Incumbent Republican Joe Read has represented the 93rd district since 2019.

Montana House of Representatives 93rd district general election, 2020
| Party | Candidate | Votes | % |
|---|---|---|---|
| Republican | Joe Read (incumbent) | 2,974 | 56.62% |
| Democratic | Lisa M. Pavlock | 2,279 | 43.38% |
| Total votes | | 5,253 | 100% |
| Republican hold | | | |

==== District 94 ====
Incumbent Democrat Kimberly Dudik has represented the 94th District and its predecessors since 2013. Dudik ran for Attorney General and Democrat Tom France won the open seat.

Montana House of Representatives 94th district general election, 2020
| Party | Candidate | Votes | % |
|---|---|---|---|
| Democratic | Tom France | 3,332 | 53.49% |
| Republican | Karen Sherman | 2,897 | 46.51% |
| Total votes | | 6,229 | 100% |
| Democratic hold | | | |

==== District 95 ====
Incumbent Democrat Shane Morigeau has represented the 95th District since 2017. Morigeau ran for the Montana Senate and Democrat Danny Tenenbaum won the open seat.

Montana House of Representatives 95th district general election, 2020
| Party | Candidate | Votes | % |
|---|---|---|---|
| Democratic | Danny Tenenbaum | 4,076 | 72.15% |
| Republican | Rebecca Dawson | 1,573 | 27.85% |
| Total votes | | 5,649 | 100% |
| Democratic hold | | | |

==== District 96 ====
Incumbent Democrat Tom Winter has represented the 96th District since 2019. Winter ran for the U.S House and Republican Matt Rosendale won the open seat.

Montana House of Representatives 96th district general election, 2020
| Party | Candidate | Votes | % |
|---|---|---|---|
| Republican | Kathy Whitman | 3,709 | 51.31% |
| Democratic | Loni Conley | 3,519 | 48.69% |
| Total votes | | 7,228 | 100% |
| Republican gain from Democratic | | | |

==== District 97 ====
Incumbent Republican Brad Tschida has represented the 97th district since 2015.

Montana House of Representatives 97th district general election, 2020
| Party | Candidate | Votes | % |
|---|---|---|---|
| Republican | Brad Tschida (incumbent) | 3,577 | 56.92% |
| Democratic | Louann Hansen | 2,707 | 43.08% |
| Total votes | | 6,284 | 100% |
| Republican hold | | | |

==== District 98 ====
Incumbent Democrat Willis Curdy has represented the 98th district since 2015.

Montana House of Representatives 98th district general election, 2020
| Party | Candidate | Votes | % |
|---|---|---|---|
| Democratic | Willis Curdy (incumbent) | 3,583 | 58.60% |
| Republican | Nancy Burgoyne | 2,229 | 36.46% |
| Libertarian | Richard L. Armerding | 302 | 4.94% |
| Total votes | | 6,114 | 100% |
| Democratic hold | | | |

==== District 99 ====
Incumbent Democrat Marilyn Ryan has represented the 99th District since 2017. Ryan didn't seek re-election and Democrat Mark Thane won the open seat.

Montana House of Representatives 99th district general election, 2020
| Party | Candidate | Votes | % |
|---|---|---|---|
| Democratic | Mark Thane | 4,088 | 64.35% |
| Republican | David “Doc” Moore | 2,265 | 35.65% |
| Total votes | | 6,353 | 100% |
| Democratic hold | | | |

==== District 100 ====
Incumbent Democrat Andrea Olsen has represented the 100th District since 2015.

Montana House of Representatives 100th district general election, 2020
| Party | Candidate | Votes | % |
|---|---|---|---|
| Democratic | Andrea Olsen (incumbent) | 5,336 | 82.33% |
| Republican | Carol Minjares | 1,145 | 17.67% |
| Total votes | | 6,481 | 100% |
| Democratic hold | | | |
