= 2022 Montana House of Representatives election =

- November 8, 2022

All 100 seats in the Montana House of Representatives 51 seats needed for a majority
	Majority party	Minority party
Leader	Wylie Galt (term-limited)	Kim Abbott
Party	Republican	Democratic
Leader since	January 4, 2021	January 4, 2021
Leader's seat	30th – Martinsdale	83rd – Helena
Last election	67	33
Seats won	68	32
Seat change	▲1	▼1
Popular vote	274,897	151,477
Percentage	63.82%	35.17%
Swing	▲4.52 (pp)	▼4.13 (pp)
- Results: Republican gain Democratic gain Republican hold Democratic hold
Speaker before election
Wylie Galt
Republican
Elected Speaker
Matt Regier
Republican

An election was held on November 8, 2022, to elect all 100 members to Montana's House of Representatives. The election coincided with elections for other offices, including the U.S. House of Representatives and state senate. The primary election was held on June 7, 2022. Republicans expanded their supermajority in chamber as they did in the senate.

== Retirements ==
=== Democrats ===
1. District 47: Katharin Kelker retired due to term limits.
2. District 48: Jessica Karjala retired due to term limits.
3. District 66: Denise Hayman retired due to term limits.
4. District 73: Jim Keane retired.
5. District 79: Robert Farris-Olsen retired.
6. District 82: Moffie Funk retired due to term limits.
7. District 84: Mary Ann Dunwell retired due to term limits.
8. District 95: Danny Tenenbaum retired.
9. District 98: Willis Curdy retired due to term limits.
10. District 100: Andrea Olsen retired due to term limits.

=== Republicans ===
1. District 7: Frank Garner retired due to term limits.
2. District 8: John Fuller retired to run for state senator from District 4.
3. District 9: Brian Putnam retired.
4. District 10: Mark Noland retired due to term limits.
5. District 11: Derek Skees retired due to term limits.
6. District 19: Wendy McKamey retired due to term limits.
7. District 26: Jeremy Trebas retired to run for state senator from District 13.
8. District 30: Wylie Galt retired due to term limits.
9. District 38: Kenneth Holmlund retired due to term limits.
10. District 39: Geraldine Custer retired due to term limits.
11. District 40: Barry Usher retired to run for state senator from District 20.
12. District 53: Dennis Lenz retired due to term limits.
13. District 55: Vince Ricci retired due to term limits.
14. District 58: Seth Berglee retired due to term limits.
15. District 88: Sharon Greef retired.
16. District 97: Brad Tschida retired due to term limits.

== Predictions ==
Source	Ranking	As of
Sabato's Crystal Ball	Safe R	May 19, 2022

== Results summary ==
=== Election ===
2022 Montana House of Representatives election General election — November 8, 2022
2022 Montana House of Repersentatives Chart
Party	Votes	Percentage	Seats	+/–
Republican	274,897	63.82	68	▲1
Democratic	151,477	35.17	32	▼1
Libertarian	2,572	0.60	0	
Independents	1,505	0.35	0	
Green	259	0.06	0	
Totals	430,710	100	100	—

=== Close races ===
Districts where the margin of victory was under 10%:

1. District 77, 0.96% gain
2. District 48, 1% gain
3. District 15, 1.01%
4. District 25, 1.75%
5. District 50, 3.62%
6. District 42, 5.73%
7. District 24, 5.97%
8. District 96, 6.06% gain
9. District 31, 7.95%
10. District 84, 7.48%
11. District 28, 9.06% gain
12. District 23, 9.83%

== Detailed results ==
=== Districts 1–20 ===
==== District 1 ====
Incumbent Republican Steve Gunderson had represented the 1st district since 2017.

Montana House of Representatives 1st district general election, 2022
Party	Candidate	Votes	%
Republican	Steve Gunderson (incumbent)	3,220	100%
Total votes		3,220	100%
Republican hold			

==== District 2 ====
Incumbent Republican Neil Duram had represented the 2nd district since 2019.

Montana House of Representatives 2nd district general election, 2022
Party	Candidate	Votes	%
Republican	Neil Duram (incumbent)	4,365	100%
Total votes		4,365	100%
Republican hold			

==== District 3 ====
Incumbent Republican Braxton Mitchell had represented the 3rd district since 2021. Loreana Wood challenged Mitchell for the Republican nomination.

Montana House of Representatives 3rd district general election, 2022
Party	Candidate	Votes	%
Republican	Braxton Mitchell (incumbent)	2,751	58.72%
Democratic	Andrea Getts	1,934	41.28%
Total votes		4,685	100%
Republican hold			

==== District 4 ====
Incumbent Republican Matt Regier had represented the 4th district since 2017.

Montana House of Representatives 4th district general election, 2022
Party	Candidate	Votes	%
Republican	Matt Regier (incumbent)	4,225	75.89%
Democratic	Kimberly Pinter	1,342	24.11%
Total votes		5,567	100%
Republican hold			

==== District 5 ====
Incumbent Democrat Dave Fern had represented the 5th district since 2017. Brian Owens and Lyn Bennett sought the Republican nomination.

Montana House of Representatives 5th district general election, 2022
Party	Candidate	Votes	%
Democratic	Dave Fern (incumbent)	3,673	61.38%
Republican	Lyn Bennett	2,311	38.62%
Total votes		5,984	100%
Democratic hold			

==== District 6 ====
Incumbent Republican Amy Regier had represented the 6th district since 2021.

Montana House of Representatives 6th district general election, 2022
Party	Candidate	Votes	%
Republican	Amy Regier (incumbent)	4,713	100%
Total votes		4,713	100%
Republican hold			

==== District 7 ====
Incumbent Republican Frank Garner had represented the 7th district since 2015. Garner was term-limited and could not seek re-election. Dave Ingram and Courtenay Sprunger sought the Republican nomination.

Montana House of Representatives 7th district general election, 2022
Party	Candidate	Votes	%
Republican	Courtenay Sprunger	2,182	63.03%
Democratic	Angela Kennedy	1,280	36.97%
Total votes		3,462	100%
Republican hold			

==== District 8 ====
Incumbent Republican John Fuller had represented the 8th district since 2019. Fuller was retiring to run for Montana Senate. David Dunn, Terry Falk, Lynne M. (Ogden) Rider, and Mark Twichel sought the Republican nomination.

Montana House of Representatives 8th district general election, 2022
Party	Candidate	Votes	%
Republican	Terry Falk	3,287	72.61%
Libertarian	Sid Daoud	1,240	27.39%
Total votes		4,527	100%
Republican hold			

==== District 9 ====
Incumbent Republican Brian Putnam had represented the 9th district since 2021. Putnam did not seek re-election. David August, Tony Brockman, and Constance Neumann sought the Republican nomination.

Montana House of representatives 9th district general election, 2022
Party	Candidate	Votes	%
Republican	Tony Brockman	3,150	100%
Total votes		3,150	100%
Republican hold			

==== District 10 ====
Incumbent Republican Mark Noland had represented the 10th district since 2015. Noland was term-limited and could not seek re-election.

Montana House of Representatives 10th district general election, 2022
Party	Candidate	Votes	%
Republican	Bob Keenan	4,942	100%
Total votes		4,942	100%
Republican hold			

==== District 11 ====
Incumbent Republican Derek Skees had represented the 11th district since 2017. Devon Decker, Ronalee Skees, and Tanner J. Smith sought the Republican nomination.

Montana House of Representatives 11th district general election, 2022
Party	Candidate	Votes	%
Republican	Tanner J. Smith	4,303	100%
Total votes		4,303	100%
Republican hold			

==== District 12 ====
Incumbent Republican Linda Reksten had represented the 12th district since 2021.

Montana House of Representatives 12th district general election, 2022
Party	Candidate	Votes	%
Republican	Linda Reksten (incumbent)	3,346	61.80%
Democratic	Sterling James Laudon	2,068	38.20%
Total votes		5,414	100%
Republican hold			

==== District 13 ====
Incumbent Republican Paul Fielder had represented the 13th district since 2021.

Montana House of Representatives 13th district general election, 2022
Party	Candidate	Votes	%
Republican	Paul Fielder (incumbent)	4,609	77.50%
Democratic	Colleen Hinds	1,338	22.50%
Total votes		5,947	100%
Republican hold			

==== District 14 ====
Incumbent Republican Denley Loge had represented the 14th district since 2017. Randy D. Mitchell challenged Loge for the Republican nomination.

Montana House of Representatives 14th district general election, 2022
Party	Candidate	Votes	%
Republican	Denley Loge (incumbent)	4,231	100%
Total votes		4,231	100%
Republican hold			

==== District 15 ====
Incumbent Democrat Marvin Weatherwax Jr. had represented the 15th district since 2019. Thedis B. Crowe and Adrian Owen Wagner challenged Weatherwax for the Democratic nomination. Ralph Foster and Bethsaida (Betsy) Johnson sought the Republican nomination.

Montana House of Representatives 15th district general election, 2022
Party	Candidate	Votes	%
Democratic	Marvin Weatherwax Jr. (incumbent)	1,303	50.50%
Republican	Ralph Foster	1,277	49.50%
Total votes		2,580	100%
Democratic hold			

==== District 16 ====
Incumbent Democrat Tyson Runningwolf had represented the 16th district since 2019.

Montana House of Representatives 16th district general election, 2022
Party	Candidate	Votes	%
Democratic	Tyson Runningwolf (incumbent)	1,605	100%
Total votes		1,605	100%
Democratic hold			

==== District 17 ====
Incumbent Republican Ross Fitzgerald had represented the 17th district since 2017. Justin Cleveland challenged Fitzgerald for the Republican nomination.

Montana House of Representatives 17th district general election, 2022
Party	Candidate	Votes	%
Republican	Ross Fitzgerald (incumbent)	3,500	76.94%
Democratic	Barnett G. Sporkin-Morrison	1,049	23.06%
Total votes		4,549	100%
Republican hold			

==== District 18 ====
Incumbent Republican Llew Jones had represented the 18th district since 2019.

Montana House of Representatives 18th district general election, 2022
Party	Candidate	Votes	%
Republican	Llew Jones (incumbent)	2,808	100%
Total votes		2,808	100%
Republican hold			

==== District 19 ====
Incumbent Republican Wendy McKamey had represented the 19th district since 2017. McKamey was retiring to run for the Montana Senate.

Montana House of Representatives 19th district general election, 2022
Party	Candidate	Votes	%
Republican	Russ Miner	3,399	100%
Total votes		3,399	100%
Republican hold			

==== District 20 ====
Incumbent Republican Fred Anderson had represented the 20th district since 2017.

Montana House of representatives 20th district general election, 2022
Party	Candidate	Votes	%
Republican	Fred Anderson (incumbent)	3,538	70.02%
Democratic	Samantha Rispens	1,515	29.98%
Total votes		5,053	100%
Republican hold			

=== Districts 21–40 ===
==== District 21 ====
Incumbent Republican Ed Buttrey had represented the 21st district since 2019.

Montana House of Representatives 21st district general election, 2022
Party	Candidate	Votes	%
Republican	Ed Buttrey (incumbent)	2,479	65.58%
Democratic	Lela Graham	1,301	34.42%
Total votes		3,780	100%
Republican hold			

==== District 22 ====
Incumbent Republican Lola Sheldon-Galloway had represented the 22nd district since 2017.

Montana House of Representatives 22nd district general election, 2022
Party	Candidate	Votes	%
Republican	Lola Sheldon-Galloway (incumbent)	1,787	56.12%
Democratic	Nick R.D. Henry	1,190	37.37%
Libertarian	Tony Rosales	207	6.50%
Total votes		3,184	100%
Republican hold			

==== District 23 ====
Incumbent Republican Scot Kerns had represented the 23rd district since 2021. Brad Hamlett and Melissa Smith sought the Democratic nomination.

Montana House of Representatives 23rd district general election, 2022
Party	Candidate	Votes	%
Republican	Scot Kerns (incumbent)	1,572	54.62%
Democratic	Melissa Smith	1,306	45.38%
Total votes		2,878	100%
Republican hold			

==== District 24 ====
Incumbent Republican Steven Galloway had represented the 24th district since 2021.

Montana House of Representatives 24th district general election, 2022
Party	Candidate	Votes	%
Republican	Steven Galloway (incumbent)	1,677	52.99%
Democratic	Barbara Bessette	1,488	47.01%
Total votes		3,165	100%
Republican hold			

==== District 25 ====
Incumbent Republican Steve Gist had represented the 25th district since 2021.

Montana House of Representatives 25th district general election, 2022
Party	Candidate	Votes	%
Republican	Steve Gist (incumbent)	1,566	50.88%
Democratic	Jasmine Krotkov	1,512	49.12%
Total votes		3,078	100%
Republican hold			

==== District 26 ====
Incumbent Republican Jeremy Trebas had represented the 26th district since 2021. Trebas was retiring to run for the Montana Senate. Marci Marceau and George Nikolakakos sought the Republican nomination.

Montana House of Representatives 26th district general election, 2022
Party	Candidate	Votes	%
Republican	George Nikolakakos	1,206	57.54%
Democratic	Kari Rosenleaf	890	42.46%
Total votes		2,096	100%
Republican hold			

==== District 27 ====
Incumbent Republican Joshua Kassmier had represented the 27th district since 2019.

Montana House of Representatives 27th district general election, 2022
Party	Candidate	Votes	%
Republican	Joshua Kassmier (incumbent)	3,851	100%
Total votes		3,851	100%
Republican hold			

==== District 28 ====
Incumbent Republican Ed Hill had represented the 28th district since 2021.

Montana House of Representatives 28th district general election, 2022
Party	Candidate	Votes	%
Democratic	Paul Tuss	1,793	54.53%
Republican	Ed Hill (incumbent)	1,495	45.47%
Total votes		3,288	100%
Democratic gain from Republican			

==== District 29 ====
Incumbent Republican Doug Flament had represented the 29th district since his appointment in 2021.

Montana House of Representatives 29th district general election, 2022
Party	Candidate	Votes	%
Republican	Doug Flament (incumbent)	3,795	100%
Total votes		3,795	100%
Republican hold			

==== District 30 ====
Incumbent Republican House Speaker Wylie Galt had represented the 30th district since 2017. Galt was term-limited and could not seek re-election. James H. Bergstrom and Randyn Gregg sought the Republican nomination.

Montana House of Representatives 30th district general election, 2022
Party	Candidate	Votes	%
Republican	James H. Bergstrom	3,814	80.75%
Democratic	Wendy Palmer	909	19.25%
Total votes		4,723	100%
Republican hold			

==== District 31 ====
Incumbent Democrat Frank Smith had represented the 31st district since 2021. Kaci Wallette challenged Smith for the Democratic nomination.

Montana House of Representatives 31st district general election, 2022
Party	Candidate	Votes	%
Democratic	Frank Smith (incumbent)	1,280	53.99%
Republican	Arlie W. Gordon	1,091	46.01%
Total votes		2,371	100%
Democratic hold			

==== District 32 ====
Incumbent Democrat Jonathan Windy Boy had represented the 32nd district since 2017.

Montana House of Representatives district general election, 2022
Party	Candidate	Votes	%
Democratic	Jonathan Windy Boy (incumbent)	1,322	100%
Total votes		1,322	100%
Democratic hold			

==== District 33 ====
Incumbent Republican Casey Knudsen had represented the 33rd district since 2017.

Montana House of Representatives 33rd district general election, 2022
Party	Candidate	Votes	%
Republican	Casey Knudsen (incumbent)	2,917	76.90%
Democratic	Jordan Ophus	876	23.10%
Total votes		3,793	100%
Republican hold			

==== District 34 ====
Incumbent Republican Rhonda Knudsen had represented the 34th district since 2019.

Montana House of Representatives 34th district general election, 2022
Party	Candidate	Votes	%
Republican	Rhonda Knudsen (incumbent)	3,590	100%
Total votes		3,590	100%
Republican hold			

==== District 35 ====
Incumbent Republican Brandon Ler had represented the 35th district since 2021.

Montana House of Representatives 35th district general election, 2022
Party	Candidate	Votes	%
Republican	Brandon Ler (incumbent)	3,160	100%
Total votes		3,160	100%
Republican hold			

==== District 36 ====
Incumbent Republican Bob Phalen had represented the 36th district since 2021.

Montana House of Representatives 36th district general election, 2022
Party	Candidate	Votes	%
Republican	Bob Phalen (incumbent)	3,281	100%
Total votes		3,281	100%
Republican hold			

==== District 37 ====
Incumbent Republican Jerry Schillinger had represented the 37th district since 2021.

Montana House of Representatives 37th district general election, 2022
Party	Candidate	Votes	%
Republican	Jerry Schillinger (incumbent)	4,654	100%
Total votes		4,654	100%
Republican hold			

==== District 38 ====
Incumbent Republican Kenneth Holmlund had represented the 38th district since 2015. Holmhund was term-limited and could not seek re-election. Wyatt Winchester English, Greg Kmetz, and Mike Willems sought the Republican nomination.

Montana House of Representatives 38th district general election, 2022
Party	Candidate	Votes	%
Republican	Greg Kmetz	2,323	64.92%
Democratic	Steve Muggli	1,255	35.08%
Total votes		3,578	100%
Republican hold			

==== District 39 ====
Incumbent Republican Geraldine Custer had represented the 39th district since 2015. Custer was term-limited and was retiring to run for Montana Senate.

Montana House of Representatives 39th district general election, 2022
Party	Candidate	Votes	%
Republican	Gary Parry	3,760	100%
Total votes		3,760	100%
Republican hold			

==== District 40 ====
Incumbent Republican Barry Usher had represented the 40th district since 2017. Usher was retiring to run for the Montana Senate. Robert T. (Bob) Goffena, John Nickelson, Greg Oblander, and Bruce Hoiland sought the Republican nomination.

Montana House of Representatives 40th district general election, 2022
Party	Candidate	Votes	%
Republican	Greg Oblander	4,029	100%
Total votes		4,029	100%
Republican hold			

=== Districts 41–60 ===
==== District 41 ====
Incumbent Democrat Rynalea Whiteman Pena had represented the 41st district since 2021.

Montana House of Representatives 41st district general election, 2022
Party	Candidate	Votes	%
Republican	Paul Green	1,230	56.94%
Democratic	Rynalea Whiteman Pena (incumbent)	930	43.06%
Total votes		2,160	100%
Republican gain from Democratic			

==== District 42 ====
Incumbent Democrat Sharon Stewart-Peregoy had represented the 42nd district since 2017.

Montana House of Representatives 42nd district general election, 2022
Party	Candidate	Votes	%
Democratic	Sharon Stewart-Peregoy (incumbent)	1,374	52.87%
Republican	Virginia McDonald	1,225	47.13%
Total votes		2,599	100%
Democratic hold			

==== District 43 ====
Incumbent Republican Kerri Seekins-Crowe had represented the 43rd district since 2021.

Montana House of Representatives 43rd district general election, 2022
Party	Candidate	Votes	%
Republican	Kerri Seekins-Crowe (incumbent)	2,998	100%
Total votes		2,998	100%
Republican hold			

==== District 44 ====
Incumbent Republican Larry Brewster had represented the 44th district since 2020.

Montana House of Representatives 44th district general election, 2022
Party	Candidate	Votes	%
Republican	Larry Brewster (incumbent)	2,377	64.49%
Democratic	Melissa Smith	1,309	35.51%
Total votes		3,686	100%
Republican hold			

==== District 45 ====
Incumbent Republican Katie Zolnikov had represented the 45th district since 2020.

Montana House of Representatives 45th district general election, 2022
Party	Candidate	Votes	%
Republican	Katie Zolnikov (incumbent)	3,564	100%
Total votes		3,564	100%
Republican hold			

==== District 46 ====
Incumbent Republican Bill Mercer had represented the 46th district since 2019.

Montana House of Representatives 46th district general election, 2022
Party	Candidate	Votes	%
Republican	Bill Mercer (incumbent)	3,204	63.89%
Democratic	Tim Warburton	1,811	36.11%
Total votes		5,015	100%
Republican hold			

==== District 47 ====
Incumbent Democrat Kathy Kelker had represented the 47th district since 2015. Kelker was term-limited and was retiring to run for the Montana Senate.

Montana House of Representatives 47th district general election, 2022
Party	Candidate	Votes	%
Democratic	Denise Baum	1,897	58.64%
Republican	Thomas J. Madigan	1,338	41.36%
Total votes		3,235	100%
Democratic hold			

==== District 48 ====
Incumbent Democrat Jessica Karjala had represented the 48th district since 2015. Karjala was term-limited and could not seek re-election.

Montana House of Representatives 48th district general election, 2022
Party	Candidate	Votes	%
Republican	Jodee Etchart	1,914	50.50%
Democratic	Jennifer Merecki	1,876	49.50%
Total votes		3,790	100%
Republican gain from Democratic			

==== District 49 ====
Incumbent Democrat Emma Kerr-Carpenter had represented the 49th district since 2018.

Montana House of Representatives 49th district general election, 2022
Party	Candidate	Votes	%
Democratic	Emma Kerr-Carpenter (incumbent)	1,438	57.91%
Republican	Jeff Wylie	1,045	42.09%
Total votes		2,483	100%
Democratic hold			

==== District 50 ====
Incumbent Republican Mallerie Stromswold had represented the 50th district since 2021. James Reavis and Erin R. Tate sought the Democratic nomination.

Montana House of Representatives 50th district general election, 2022
Party	Candidate	Votes	%
Republican	Mallerie Stromswold (incumbent)	1,468	51.82%
Democratic	James Reavis	1,365	48.18%
Total votes		2,833	100%
Republican hold			

==== District 51 ====
Incumbent Republican Frank Fleming had represented the 51st district since 2018. Fleming did not seek re-election.

Montana House of Representatives 51st district general election, 2022
Party	Candidate	Votes	%
Republican	Mike Yakawich (incumbent)	1,872	56.10%
Democratic	Carole Boerner	1,465	43.90%
Total votes		3,337	100%
Republican hold			

==== District 52 ====
Incumbent Republican Sherry Essmann had represented the 52nd district since her appointment on June 11, 2021.

Montana House of Representatives 52nd district general election, 2022
Party	Candidate	Votes	%
Republican	Sherry Essmann (incumbent)	1,711	59.06%
Democratic	Jenna Martin	1,186	40.94%
Total votes		2,897	100%
Republican hold			

==== District 53 ====
Incumbent Republican Dennis Lenz had represented the 53rd district since 2017. Lenz was retiring to run for the Montana Senate.

Montana House of Representatives 53rd district general election, 2022
Party	Candidate	Votes	%
Republican	Nelly Nicol	5,918	100%
Total votes		5,918	100%
Republican hold			

==== District 54 ====
Incumbent Republican Terry Moore had represented the 54th district since 2019.

Montana House of Representatives 54th district general election, 2022
Party	Candidate	Votes	%
Republican	Terry Moore (incumbent)	3,778	100%
Total votes		3,778	100%
Republican hold			

==== District 55 ====
Incumbent Republican Vince Ricci had represented the 55th district since 2015. Ricci was term-limited and could not seek re-election. Lee Deming and Curtis Schomer sought the Republican nomination.

Montana House of Representatives 55th district general election, 2022
Party	Candidate	Votes	%
Republican	Lee Deming	3,144	100%
Total votes		3,144	100%
Republican hold			

==== District 56 ====
Incumbent Republican Sue Vinton had represented the 56th district since 2017.

Montana House of Representatives 56th district general election, 2022
Party	Candidate	Votes	%
Republican	Sue Vinton (incumbent)	2,968	100%
Total votes		2,968	100%
Republican hold			

==== District 57 ====
Incumbent Republican Fiona Nave had represented the 57th district since 2021.

Montana House of Representatives 57th district general election, 2022
Party	Candidate	Votes	%
Republican	Fiona Nave (incumbent)	3,440	73.19%
Democratic	Thomas E. Flanagan	1,260	26.81%
Total votes		4,700	100%
Republican hold			

==== District 58 ====
Incumbent Republican Seth Berglee had represented the 58th district since 2015. Berglee was term-limited and could not seek re-election.

Montana House of Representatives 58th district general election, 2022
Party	Candidate	Votes	%
Republican	Brad Barker	3,841	66.44%
Democratic	Judith P. Gregory	1,940	33.56%
Total votes		5,781	100%
Republican hold			

==== District 59 ====
Incumbent Republican Marty Malone had represented the 59th district since 2021.

Montana House of Representatives 59th district general election, 2022
Party	Candidate	Votes	%
Republican	Marty Malone (incumbent)	3,643	65.47%
Democratic	Ruth Weissman	1,921	34.53%
Total votes		5,564	100%
Republican hold			

==== District 60 ====
Incumbent Democrat Laurie Bishop had represented the 60th district since 2017.

Montana House of Representatives 60th district general election, 2022
Party	Candidate	Votes	%
Democratic	Laurie Bishop (incumbent)	3,085	57.85%
Republican	Dan Skattum	2,248	42.15%
Total votes		5,333	100%
Democratic hold			

=== Districts 61–80 ===
==== District 61 ====
Incumbent Democrat Jim Hamilton had represented the 61st district and its predecessors since 2017.

Montana House of Representatives 61st district general election, 2022
Party	Candidate	Votes	%
Democratic	Jim Hamilton (incumbent)	4,263	62.38%
Republican	Peter Bower	2,432	35.59%
Green	Steve Kelly	139	2.03%
Total votes		6,834	100%
Democratic hold			

==== District 62 ====
Incumbent Democrat Ed Stafman had represented the 62nd district since 2021.

Montana House of Representatives 62nd district general election, 2022
Party	Candidate	Votes	%
Democratic	Ed Stafman (incumbent)	4,734	72.88%
Republican	Marc Greendorfer	1,762	27.12%
Total votes		6,496	100%
Democratic hold			

==== District 63 ====
Incumbent Democrat Alice Buckley had represented the 63rd district since 2021.

Montana House of Representatives 63rd district general election, 2022
Party	Candidate	Votes	%
Democratic	Alice Buckley (incumbent)	2,419	59.79%
Republican	Catherine Purcell	1,627	40.21%
Total votes		4,046	100%
Democratic hold			

==== District 64 ====
Incumbent Republican Jane Gillette had represented the 64th district since 2021. Alanah Griffith and Michelle Vered sought the Democratic nomination.

Montana House of Representatives 64th district general election, 2022
Party	Candidate	Votes	%
Republican	Jane Gillette (incumbent)	3,551	53.80%
Democratic	Alanah Griffith	2,871	43.50%
Libertarian	Doug Campbell	178	2.70%
Total votes		6,600	100%
Republican hold			

==== District 65 ====
Incumbent Democrat Kelly Kortum had represented the 65th district since 2021. James Cocco and Ryan Eisele sought the Republican nomination.

Montana House of Representatives 65th district general election, 2022
Party	Candidate	Votes	%
Democratic	Kelly Kortum (incumbent)	4,562	63.56%
Republican	James Cocco	2,615	36.44%
Total votes		7,177	100%
Democratic hold			

==== District 66 ====
Incumbent Democrat Denise Hayman had represented the 66th district since 2015. Hayman was term-limited and was retiring to run for the Montana Senate.

Montana House of Representatives 66th district general election, 2022
Party	Candidate	Votes	%
Democratic	Eric Matthews	3,739	100%
Total votes		3,739	100%
Democratic hold			

==== District 67 ====
Incumbent Republican Jedediah Hinkle had represented the 67th district since 2021.

Montana House of Representatives 67th district general election, 2022
Party	Candidate	Votes	%
Republican	Jedediah Hinkle (incumbent)	3,213	59.28%
Democratic	Elizabeth Marum	2,207	40.72%
Total votes		5,420	100%
Republican hold			

==== District 68 ====
Incumbent Republican Caleb Hinkle had represented the 68th district since 2021. Former representative Bruce Grubbs challenged Hinkle for the Republican nomination.

Montana House of Representatives 68th district general election, 2022
Party	Candidate	Votes	%
Republican	Caleb Hinkle (incumbent)	3,156	65.45%
Democratic	Joe Hancock	1,666	34.55%
Total votes		4,822	100%
Republican hold			

==== District 69 ====
Incumbent Republican Jennifer Carlson had represented the 69th district since 2021.

Montana House of Representatives 69th district general election, 2022
Party	Candidate	Votes	%
Republican	Jennifer Carlson (incumbent)	3,951	68.93%
Democratic	Rocky Hamilton	1,648	28.75%
Libertarian	Carl Mohler Jr.	133	2.32%
Total votes		5,732	100%
Republican hold			

==== District 70 ====
Incumbent Republican Julie Dooling had represented the 70th district since 2019. Jeremiah Dawson and Jon Jackson sought the Democratic nomination.

Montana House of Representatives 70th district general election, 2022
Party	Candidate	Votes	%
Republican	Julie Dooling (incumbent)	4,952	76.01%
Democratic	Jon Jackson	1,563	23.99%
Total votes		6,515	100%
Republican hold			

==== District 71 ====
Incumbent Republican Ken Walsh had represented the 71st district since 2021.

Montana House of Representatives 71st district general election, 2022
Party	Candidate	Votes	%
Republican	Ken Walsh (incumbent)	5,215	100%
Total votes		5,215	100%
Republican hold			

==== District 72 ====
Incumbent Republican Tom Welch had represented the 72nd district since 2017.

Montana House of Representatives 72nd district general election, 2022
Party	Candidate	Votes	%
Republican	Tom Welch (incumbent)	4,064	81.44%
Democratic	Holt Gibson	926	18.56%
Total votes		4,990	100%
Republican hold			

==== District 73 ====
Incumbent Democrat Jim Keane had represented the 73rd district since 2017. Keane did not seek re-election.

Montana House of Representatives 73rd district general election, 2022
Party	Candidate	Votes	%
Democratic	Jennifer Lynch	2,355	62.58%
Republican	Jason Freeman	1,408	37.42%
Total votes		3,763	100%
Democratic hold			

==== District 74 ====
Incumbent Democrat Derek Harvey had represented the 74th district since 2019.

Montana House of Representatives 74th district general election, 2022
Party	Candidate	Votes	%
Democratic	Derek Harvey (incumbent)	2,208	68.09%
Republican	James W. Kephart	1,035	31.91%
Total votes		3,243	100%
Democratic hold			

==== District 75 ====
Incumbent Republican Marta Bertoglio had represented the 75th district since 2021. Timothy D. McKenrick challenged Bertoglio for the Republican nomination.

Montana House of Representatives 75th district general election, 2022
Party	Candidate	Votes	%
Republican	Marta Bertoglio (incumbent)	4,409	100%
Total votes		4,409	100%
Republican hold			

==== District 76 ====
Incumbent Democrat Donavon Hawk had represented the 76th district since 2021.

Montana House of Representatives 76th district general election, 2022
Party	Candidate	Votes	%
Democratic	Donavon Hawk (incumbent)	3,135	62.75%
Republican	Suzzann Nordwick	1,861	37.25%
Total votes		4,996	100%
Democratic hold			

==== District 77 ====
Incumbent Democrat Sara Novak had represented the 79th district since 2021.

Montana House of Representatives 77th district general election, 2022
Party	Candidate	Votes	%
Republican	John Fitzpatrick	2,490	50.48%
Democratic	Sara Novak (incumbent)	2,443	49.52%
Total votes		4,933	100%
Republican gain from Democratic			

==== District 78 ====
Incumbent Republican Gregory Frazer had represented the 78th district since 2021. Steven D. Grant challenged Frazer for the Republican nomination.

Montana House of Representatives 78th district general election, 2022
Party	Candidate	Votes	%
Republican	Gregory Frazer (incumbent)	2,504	100%
Total votes		2,504	100%
Republican hold			

==== District 79 ====
Incumbent Democrat Robert Farris-Olsen had represented the 79th district since 2019. Farris-Olsen did not seek re-election.

Montana House of Representatives 79th district general election, 2022
Party	Candidate	Votes	%
Democratic	Laura Smith	3,328	60.82%
Republican	Keith Pigman	2,144	39.18%
Total votes		5,472	100%
Democratic hold			

==== District 80 ====
Incumbent Republican Becky Beard had represented the 80th district since 2017.

Montana House of Representatives 80th district general election, 2022
Party	Candidate	Votes	%
Republican	Becky Beard (incumbent)	4,702	100%
Total votes		4,702	100%
Republican hold			

=== Districts 81–100 ===
==== District 81 ====
Incumbent Democrat Mary Caferro had represented the 81st district since 2019. Caferro was running for re-election in the 82nd district. Melissa Romano, Jake C. Troyer, and Jacob B. Torgerson sought the Democratic nomination. Charlie Hull and Jill Sark sought the Republican nomination.

Montana House of Representatives 81st district general election, 2022
Party	Candidate	Votes	%
Democratic	Melissa Romano	2,827	57.91%
Republican	Jill Sark	2,055	42.09%
Total votes		4,882	100%
Democratic hold			

==== District 82 ====
Incumbent Democrat Moffie Funk had represented the 82nd district since 2015. Funk was term-limited and could not seek re-election. 81st district representative Mary Caferro and Craig Sundberg sought the Democratic nomination.

Montana House of Representatives 82nd district general election, 2022
Party	Candidate	Votes	%
Democratic	Mary Caferro	2,944	61.27%
Republican	Alden Tonkay	1,861	38.73%
Total votes		4,805	100%
Democratic hold			

==== District 83 ====
Incumbent Democratic Minority Leader Kim Abbott had represented the 83rd district since 2017.

Montana House of Representatives 83rd district general election, 2022
Party	Candidate	Votes	%
Democratic	Kim Abbott (incumbent)	2,516	58.47%
Republican	Bob Leach	1,787	41.53%
Total votes		4,303	100%
Democratic hold			

==== District 84 ====
Incumbent Democrat Mary Ann Dunwell had represented the 84th Ddstrict since 2015. Dunwell was term-limited and was retiring to run for the Montana Senate. State Senate Minority Leader Jill Cohenour and Noah J. Horan sought the Democratic nomination. Kurt J. Aughney, Keith Pigman, and Kaitlyn Ruch sought the Republican nomination.

Montana House of Representatives 84th district general election, 2022
Party	Candidate	Votes	%
Democratic	Jill Cohenour	2,587	53.75%
Republican	Kaitlyn Ruch	2,226	46.25%
Total votes		4,813	100%
Democratic hold			

==== District 85 ====
Incumbent Republican Michele Binkley had represented the 85th district since 2021.

Montana House of Representatives 85th district general election, 2022
Party	Candidate	Votes	%
Republican	Michele Binkley (incumbent)	4,735	75.80%
Democratic	Rosan Stover	1,512	24.20%
Total votes		6,247	100%
Republican hold			

==== District 86 ====
Incumbent Republican David Bedey had represented the 86th district since 2019. Jeffrey B. Jones challenged Bedey for the Republican nomination.

Montana House of Representatives 86th district general election, 2022
Party	Candidate	Votes	%
Republican	David Bedey (incumbent)	3,592	66.73%
Democratic	Anne W. Brown	1,791	33.27%
Total votes		5,383	100%
Republican hold			

==== District 87 ====
Incumbent Republican Ron Marshall had represented the 87th district since 2021.

Montana House of Representatives 87th district general election, 2022
Party	Candidate	Votes	%
Republican	Ron Marshall (incumbent)	4,012	72.72%
Independent	Will Lovett Moore	1,505	27.28%
Total votes		5,517	100%
Republican hold			

==== District 88 ====
Incumbent Republican Sharon Greef had represented the 88th district since 2019. Greef was not seeking re-election. Alan Lackey and Wayne Rusk sought the Republican nomination.

Montana House of Representatives 88th district general election, 2022
Party	Candidate	Votes	%
Republican	Wayne Rusk	4,110	70.03%
Democratic	Ko Moua	1,759	29.97%
Total votes		5,869	100%
Republican hold			

==== District 89 ====
Incumbent Democrat Katie Sullivan had represented the 89th district since 2019.

Montana House of Representatives 89th district general election, 2022
Party	Candidate	Votes	%
Democratic	Katie Sullivan (incumbent)	2,861	62.18%
Republican	Gary Wanberg	1,740	37.82%
Total votes		4,601	100%
Democratic hold			

==== District 90 ====
Incumbent Democrat Marilyn Marler had represented the 90th district since 2019.

Montana House of Representatives 90th district general election, 2022
Party	Candidate	Votes	%
Democratic	Marilyn Marler (incumbent)	3,290	68.93%
Republican	Alan Ault	1,259	26.38%
Green	Gary Marbut	120	2.51%
Libertarian	Josiah Hinkle	104	2.18%
Total votes		4,773	100%
Democratic hold			

==== District 91 ====
Incumbent Democrat Connie Keogh had represented the 91st district since 2019.

Montana House of Representatives 91st district general election, 2022
Party	Candidate	Votes	%
Democratic	Connie Keogh (incumbent)	4,730	84.04%
Republican	Beth Wanberg	898	15.96%
Total votes		5,628	100%
Democratic hold			

==== District 92 ====
Incumbent Republican Mike Hopkins had represented the 92nd district since 2017.

Montana House of Representatives 92nd district general election, 2022
Party	Candidate	Votes	%
Republican	Mike Hopkins (incumbent)	2,770	56.19%
Democratic	Gary M. Stein	2,160	43.81%
Total votes		4,930	100%
Republican hold			

==== District 93 ====
Incumbent Republican Joe Read had represented the 93rd district since 2019.

Montana House of Representatives 93rd district general election, 2022
Party	Candidate	Votes	%
Republican	Joe Read (incumbent)	2,419	57.08%
Democratic	Shirley Azzopardi	1,664	39.26%
Libertarian	Devin J. Braaten	155	3.66%
Total votes		4,238	100%
Republican hold			

==== District 94 ====
Incumbent Democrat Tom France had represented the 94th district since 2021.

Montana House of Representatives 94th district general election, 2022
Party	Candidate	Votes	%
Democratic	Tom France (incumbent)	2,798	55.46%
Republican	Rebecca Mapston	2,247	44.54%
Total votes		5,045	100%
Democratic hold			

==== District 95 ====
Incumbent Democrat Danny Tenenbaum had represented the 95th district since 2021. Tenenbaum did not seek re-election.

Montana House of Representatives 95th district general election, 2022
Party	Candidate	Votes	%
Democratic	SJ Howell	3,117	74.96%
Republican	Lauren Subith	905	21.77%
Libertarian	J.C. Windmueller	136	3.27%
Total votes		4,158	100%
Democratic hold			

==== District 96 ====
Jonathan Karlen won the 2022 Democratic primary election against Linda Swanson and defeated Republican incumbent Kathy Whitman in the 2022 general election.

Montana House of Representatives 96th district general election, 2022
Party	Candidate	Votes	%
Democratic	Jonathan Karlen	3,035	53.03%
Republican	Kathy Whitman (incumbent)	2,688	46.97%
Total votes		5,723	100%
Democratic gain from Republican			

==== District 97 ====
Incumbent Republican Brad Tschida had represented the 97th district since 2015. Tschida was term-limited and was retiring to run for the Montana Senate. Michael Burkes and Lyn Hellegaard sought the Republican nomination.

Montana House of Representatives 97th district general election, 2022
Party	Candidate	Votes	%
Republican	Lyn Hellegaard	2,898	55.99%
Democratic	Devin Jackson	2,278	44.01%
Total votes		5,176	100%
Republican hold			

==== District 98 ====
Incumbent Democrat Willis Curdy had represented the 98th district since 2015. Curdy was term-limited and was retiring to run for the Montana Senate. Bob Carter and Andy Nelson sought the Democratic nomination.

Montana House of Representatives 98th district general election, 2022
Party	Candidate	Votes	%
Democratic	Bob Carter	2,985	59.07%
Republican	Sonia Shearer-Hiett	1,860	36.81%
Libertarian	Richard L. Armerding	208	4.12%
Total votes		5,053	100%
Democratic hold			

==== District 99 ====
Incumbent Democrat Mark Thane had represented the 99th district since 2021.

Montana House of Representatives 99th district general election, 2022
Party	Candidate	Votes	%
Democratic	Mark Thane (incumbent)	3,417	65.99%
Republican	Ryan Darling	1,761	34.01%
Total votes		5,178	100%
Democratic hold			

==== District 100 ====
Incumbent Democrat Andrea Olsen had represented the 100th district since 2015. Olsen was term-limited and was retiring to run for the Montana Senate. David Severson and Zooey Zephyr sought the Democratic nomination.

Montana House of Representatives 100th district general election, 2022
Party	Candidate	Votes	%
Democratic	Zooey Zephyr	4,053	79.21%
Republican	Sean Patrick McCoy	853	16.67%
Libertarian	Michael Vanecek	211	4.12%
Total votes		5,117	100%
Democratic hold			

== See also ==
- List of Montana state legislatures
