= Paul Fielder =

American politician

Member of the Montana House of Representatives from the 14th district
- Incumbent
- Assumed office January 6, 2025
- Preceded by: Denley Loge

Member of the Montana House of Representatives from the 13th district
- In office January 4, 2021 – January 6, 2025
- Preceded by: Bob Brown
- Succeeded by: Linda Reksten

Personal details
- Party: Republican
- Spouse: Jennifer Fielder

Paul C. Fielder is an American politician from Montana. He is a Republican member of the Montana House of Representatives. In 2024 he was elected to District 14, which represents Thompson Falls and the nearby towns of Noxon, Trout Creek, and Plains.

Fielder first ran for election in 2020. He contested the 13th district with Democrat Colleen Hinds and Libertarian Cade Stiles, winning with 71% of the vote. He again faced Hinds, a retired nurse, in the 2022 elections. He won with 77% of the vote.

Due to redistricting following the US census Fielder ran for District 14 in the 2024 elections. The election was once again between Fielder and Hinds. This time he took 75% of the vote.
