= Senator Ryan =

Senator Ryan may refer to:

- Allan A. Ryan Jr. (1903–1981), New York State Senate
- Don Ryan (born 1951), Montana State Senate
- Harold L. Ryan (1923–1995), Idaho State Senate
- Harold M. Ryan (1911–2007), Michigan State Senate
- Irene E. Ryan (1909–1997), Alaska State Senate
- James Ryan (Wisconsin politician) (1830–1913), Wisconsin State Senate
- John Ryan (New Mexico politician) (fl. 2000s–2010s), New Mexico State Senate
- Scott Ryan (Australian politician) (born 1973), former President of the Australian Senate
- Susan Ryan (1942-2020), senator for the Australian Capital Territory
- Tim Ryan (Ohio politician) (born 1973), Ohio State Senate
