= Kerri Seekins-Crowe =

American politician

Member of the Montana House of Representatives from the 39th district
- Incumbent
- Assumed office January 6, 2025
- Preceded by: Gary Parry

Member of the Montana House of Representatives from the 43rd district
- In office January 4, 2021 – January 6, 2025
- Preceded by: Peggy Webb
- Succeeded by: Larry Brewster

Personal details
- Born: Kerri Seekins
- Party: Republican
- Spouse: Michael Crowe
- Children: 2
- Education: University of Alaska Fairbanks (BBA); Campbell University (MBA)

Kerri Seekins-Crowe is an American politician serving as a member of the Montana House of Representatives from the 39th district. The district roughly covers the Heights neighborhood of Billings, Montana.

Seekins-Crowe first ran for office in November 2020. She defeated Libertarian Melody Benes for House District 43 with 70% of the vote and assumed office on January 4, 2021. That year she served on three committees: Business and Labor, Education, and Fish, Wildlife and Parks. In 2022 she ran unopposed. For the 68th Montana Legislature she was Vice Chair for the Business and Labor committee. She also served on the House and the Joint Education committee and the Local Government committee.

Due to redistricting following the US census Seekins-Crowe ran for District 39 in the 2024 elections. She defeated Democrat Melissa Smith with 66% of the vote. She again was Vice Chair for the Business and Labor committee and was assigned to the Education and Local Government committees.

== Education ==
Seekins-Crowe earned a Bachelor of Business Administration from the University of Alaska Fairbanks and a Master of Business Administration from Campbell University.

== Career ==
Seekins-Crowe is a realtor. She previously was a customer service representative for Delta Air Lines. She previously served as an aide to Alaska Senator Ted Stevens. She has since worked as an adjunct professor of business at Montana State University Billings, Athens Technical College, Truett McConnell University, Bauder College, and Coastal Carolina Community College. Seekins-Crowe was elected to the Montana House of Representatives in November 2020 and assumed office on January 4, 2021.

In April 2023, Seekins-Crowe created controversy with comments she made on the Montana House floor about her reaction to her daughter's suicidal ideation:

One of the big issues that we have heard today and we've talked about lately is that without surgery the risk of suicide goes way up. Well, I am one of those parents who lived with a daughter who was suicidal for three years. Someone once asked me, "Wouldn't I just do anything to help save her?" And I really had to think and the answer was, "No." I was not going to give in to her emotional manipulation because she was incapable of making those decisions and I had to make those decisions for her. I was not going to let her tear apart my family and I was not going to let her tear apart me because I had to be strong for her, I had to have a vision for her life when she had none, was incapable of having none. I was lost. I was scared. I spent hours on the floor in prayer because I didn't know that when I woke up, if my daughter was going to be alive or not. But I knew that I had to make those right decisions for her so that she would have a precious, successful adulthood at that time.

Seekins-Crowe stated in an interview that the media had lied and distorted her comments by reporting them verbatim; as some reports said her daughter was transgender, when that was not mentioned in Seekins-Crowe's comments. In a video posted on social media, Seekins-Crowe's daughter confirmed she was not and never was transgender.
