= Adam Hertz =

American politician

Adam Hertz is an American politician. From 2012 to 2015, he served as a nonpartisan member of the Missoula City Council, where he represented Ward 2. From 2017 to 2018, he served as a Republican member of the Montana House of Representatives, where he represented District 96, including parts of Missoula, Montana. He lost reelection to Tom Winter in 2018.
