= Katie Zolnikov =

American politician (born 1997)

Speaker pro tempore of the Montana House of Representatives
- Incumbent
- Assumed office January 6, 2025
- Preceded by: Rhonda Knudsen

Member of the Montana House of Representatives from the 44th district
- Incumbent
- Assumed office January 6, 2025
- Preceded by: Larry Brewster

Member of the Montana House of Representatives from the 45th district
- In office October 5, 2020 – January 6, 2025
- Preceded by: Daniel Zolnikov
- Succeeded by: Denise Baum

Personal details
- Born: 1997 (age 28–29)
- Party: Republican
- Spouse: Daniel Zolnikov

Katie Zolnikov is an American politician serving as a member of the Montana House of Representatives, representing House District (HD) 44 since January 2025. The district includes Shepherd, Montana and part of the Billings Heights neighborhood of Billings. She is a Republican.

Zolnikov previously represented the HD 45 (2020-2025). She was appointed to succeed her husband Daniel Zolnikov in the 45th district after he resigned from the House in 2020. She ran unopposed in the November 2020. She was again unopposed in the 2022 elections. In 2023, Zolnikov served as chairperson of the House Committee on Energy, Technology and Federal Relations.

Due to redistricting following the 2020 U.S. census, Zolnikov ran to represent the 44th district in the 2024 elections. She was once again unopposed. She was assigned as chair for the ethics committee for the legislative session.

In November 2026 she was elected as the first female Speaker of the Montana House of Representatives.

== Electoral history ==
2020 Montana State House District 45 Republican primary
Party	Candidate	Votes	%
Republican	Katie Zolnikov	2,088	100.00%

2020 Montana State House District 45 general election
Party	Candidate	Votes	%
Republican	Katie Zolnikov	4,996	100.00%

2022 Montana State House District 45 Republican primary
Party	Candidate	Votes	%
Republican	Katie Zolnikov	2,034	100.00%

2022 Montana State House District 45 general election
Party	Candidate	Votes	%
Republican	Katie Zolnikov	3,564	100.00%

2024 Montana State House District 44 Republican primary
Party	Candidate	Votes	%
Republican	Katie Zolnikov	1,803	100.00%

2024 Montana State House District 45 general election
Party	Candidate	Votes	%
Republican	Katie Zolnikov	4,508	100.00%

Montana House of Representatives
Preceded by Rhonda Knudsen	Speaker pro tempore of the Montana House of Representatives; 2025–present	Incumbent
