= Steve Gist =

American politician

Member of the Montana House of Representatives from the 25th district
- Incumbent
- Assumed office January 4, 2021
- Preceded by: Jasmine Krotkov

Personal details
- Party: Republican

Steve Gist is an American politician from Montana. He is a Republican member of the Montana House of Representatives for District 25. The district covers the western part of Cascade County.

Gist first ran for the House in the 2020 elections. He defeated Democratic incumbent Jasmine Krotkov with 53% of the vote. The two faced each other again in the 2022 elections. The district had another close race with Gist winning 51% of the vote. In 2024 Gist won 75% of the vote against Democrat James Rickley.

In 2021 Gist was assigned to the Natural Resources, Local Government, and Business and Labor committees. In 2023 he served as a Majority Whip. He was Vice Chair for the Joint Natural Resources and the House Natural Resources committees. He was a member of the Legislative Administration, Local Government, and Business and Labor committees. During the 2025 session he was Chair for the Natural Resources committee and a member for Business and Labor.

== Personal life ==
Gist moved to Great Falls, Montana in 1985. Gist is a healthcare worker. He has owned and operated an ambulance service, worked for Mercy Flight, and in the emergency room. He is a Registered Nurse. He also has a wild land fire contracting business along with his wife.
