= Amy Regier =

Montana politician

Member of the Montana House of Representatives from the 6th district
- Incumbent
- Assumed office January 4, 2021
- Preceded by: Carl Glimm

Personal details
- Born: 1978 (age 47–48) Kalispell, Montana, U.S.
- Party: Republican
- Relatives: Keith Regier (father); Matt Regier (brother)
- Education: Montana State University (BSN)
- Occupation: Registered nurse

Amy Regier is an American politician and a Republican member of the Montana House of Representatives. She has represented District 6, an area northwest of Kalispell, since 2021.

Regier first ran for the Montana House of Representatives in the 2020 elections. She defeated Jerramy Dear-Ruel with 69.3% of the votes. In 2022 she was unopposed. She ran against Velvet Phillips-Sullivan in the 2024 election. She once again received 69% of the vote.

For the 2025 legislative session Regier is the Majority Whip. She also serves as the Chair of the House Judiciary Committee.

She was educated at Flathead High School, and received a degree from Montana State University's College of Nursing. She has worked as a nurse at Kalispell Regional Medical Center. Her father is Keith Regier, a former Montana legislator.
