= Larry Brewster =

American politician

Member of the Montana House of Representatives from the 43rd district
- Incumbent
- Assumed office January 6, 2025
- Preceded by: Kerri Seekins-Crowe

Member of the Montana House of Representatives from the 44th district
- In office March 24, 2020 – January 6, 2025
- Preceded by: Dale Mortensen
- Succeeded by: Katie Zolnikov

Personal details
- Born: 1951 (age 74–75) Idaho Falls, Idaho
- Party: Republican
- Spouse: Vonda
- Children: Two

Military service
- Allegiance: United States
- Branch/service: United States Army
- Years of service: 1969-1972
- Battles/wars: Vietnam War

Larry Brewster is an American politician from Montana. He is a Republican member of the Montana House of Representatives for District 43. The district represents part of the Heights neighborhood in Billings, Montana.

Brewster was appointed to the Montana House of Representatives and sworn in on March 24, 2020, following the death of Dale Mortensen. He represented the 44th district. He then ran for election in November 2020. He won 64% of the vote against Democratic candidate Terry Dennis. That year he was appointed as vice chair of the Local Government Committee. In 2022, Brewster ran for re-election, and defeated Democrat Melissa Smith with 64% of the vote. For this legislative session he was appointed chair for Local Government and vice chair of the Rules Committee.

Due to redistricting following the 2020 U.S. census, Brewster ran for District 43 in the 2024 elections. He defeated Democratic challenger Alexander Clark with 64% of the vote. He once again was appointed as chair for the Local Government Committee.

== Early life and education ==
Brewster was born in Idaho Falls, Idaho, and completed vocational training programs at Idaho State University. He served in the United States Army from 1969 to 1972.

== Career ==
Brewster worked at NorthWestern Corporation from 1982 until his retirement in 2016. He was a member of the Billings Public Schools District Board of Education for six years and was a member of the Billings City Council for eleven years.
