= World College West =

Undergraduate liberal arts college in Marin County, California

Coordinates: 38.1753°N 122.6055°W

World College West was an undergraduate liberal arts college in Marin County, California. Founded by Dr. Richard M. Gray, it offered a program that integrated a grounding in the liberal arts with work-study and a required two-quarter "World Study" in a developing country. It opened with its first seven students on September 17, 1973.

== History ==
Fully accredited by the Western Association of Schools and Colleges, World College West had programs in International Service and Development (ISD), International Environmental Studies (IES), Art and Society (AS), and Meaning, Culture, and Change (MCC). In later years, Business and International Business was added to the program line-up. ISD focused on the economic, political, and social development of "Third World" nations; IES concentrated on the wise use and global conservation of natural resources; AS examined the relationship between culture and the performing and visual arts; and MCC focused on the variety of ways in which the world's diverse cultures, through their systems of religion, philosophy, and tradition, give meaning and purpose to human life, and to the world around us.

The college's World Study Programs were established in China, Mexico, Nepal, India, Ghana, and Russia. Students could spend two quarters (six months) studying in both an urban and rural setting in one of these countries. During the urban stay, students lived with a host family and attended regularly scheduled language, culture, and history classes. During the rural stay, students again lived with host families and conducted independent research studies while continuing to learn the country's language.

The college placed a special emphasis on work-study and internships, because the founders of the college believed that learning occurred best through "disciplined reflection on experience". Once an area of study was selected, students were required to complete 480 internship hours in their field of study as part of their graduation requirement.

During its first few years, the College leased space on the campus of the San Francisco Theological Seminary in San Anselmo, followed by several years in surplus army barracks at Fort Cronkhite on the Pacific Ocean. In the early 1980s the college built and moved to a permanent campus off U.S. Highway 101 in the rolling hills of northern Marin County, between Novato and Petaluma (now the home of the Institute of Noetic Sciences).

World College West closed due to inadequate funding in Fall of 1992, the result of difficulties in succession after its founding president retired. The spirit of WCW lives on in Dick Gray's successor institution Presidio Graduate School. The hundreds of WCW alumni call themselves "Westies".

After the college closed, alumni transcripts and records were transferred to nearby Sonoma State University.

== Notable alumni ==
- Jasmine Krotkov, retired postal worker and member of the Montana House of Representatives
- Ted Kaye, secretary of the North American Vexillological Association
