= Laura Smith (American politician) =

American politician

Member of the Montana House of Representatives from the 79th district
- In office January 2, 2023 – January 25, 2025
- Preceded by: Robert Farris-Olsen
- Succeeded by: Luke Muszkiewicz

Personal details
- Party: Democratic
- Spouse: Mac
- Children: 2
- Education: University of Utah, University of Pennsylvania
- Profession: Lawyer

Laura Smith is an American politician in the Montana Senate. She served as a member of the Montana House of Representatives from January 2, 2023 to January 25, 2025. She represented Montana's 79th House district.

== Electoral history ==
She was elected on November 8, 2022, in the 2022 Montana House of Representatives election against Republican opponent Keith Pigman. She assumed office on January 2, 2023.

== Biography ==
Smith earned a bachelor's degree from the University of Utah in 2004 and a J.D. from the University of Pennsylvania in 2009. She has worked as a Federal Prosecutor in the United States District Court for the District of Montana. She has also been deputy director of the Montana Department of Public Health and Human Services.

Montana House of Representatives
Preceded by Robert Farris-Olsen	Member of the Montana House of Representatives; 2023–present	Succeeded by incumbent
