= Mike Hopkins (politician) =

American politician (born 1984)

Member of the Montana House of Representatives from the 92nd district
- In office 2017–2024
- Preceded by: David Moore
- Succeeded by: Connie Keogh

Personal details
- Born: April 9, 1984 (age 42) Helena, Montana, U.S.
- Party: Republican
- Education: University of Montana (BA)
- Profession: Politician

Mike Hopkins (born April 9, 1984) is an American politician. He serves as a Republican member of the Montana House of Representatives, where he represents District 92, including parts of Missoula, Montana. He served four two-year terms, the maximum term limit for the position.
