= Tom Winter (politician) =

American politician

Member of the Montana House of Representatives from the 96th district
- In office January 7, 2019 – January 4, 2021
- Preceded by: Adam Hertz
- Succeeded by: Kathy Whitman

Personal details
- Born: July 10, 1986 (age 40)
- Party: Democratic
- Education: University of Montana
- Website: Campaign website

Thomas A. Winter (born July 10, 1986) is an American politician from the state of Montana. A member of the Democratic Party, he served in the Montana House of Representatives for the 96th district from 2019 to 2021.

== Early life ==
Winter was raised in Kansas City, Missouri, and moved to Missoula, Montana, in his early 20s to attend the University of Montana.

== Career ==
Winter defeated Adam Hertz to win election to the Montana House in the 2018 election.

In the 2020 election, Winter ran for the United States House of Representatives seat from Montana's at-large congressional district. He lost the Democratic Party's nomination to Kathleen Williams. Winter ran for Montana's 1st congressional district in the 2022 election. He lost the Democratic Party’s nomination to Monica Tranel.
