= Gordon Pierson =

American politician

Member of the Montana House of Representatives
- In office January 7, 2013 – January 4, 2021
- Preceded by: Cynthia Hiner
- Succeeded by: Gregory Frazer
- Constituency: 85th district (2013–2015); 78th district (2015–2021)

Personal details
- Born: May 21, 1971 (age 55) Deer Lodge, Montana, U.S.
- Party: Democratic

Gordon Pierson (born May 21, 1971) is an American politician who served in the Montana House of Representatives from 2013 to 2021.

Pierson unsuccessfully ran for District 39 of the Montana Senate in 2020 earning 12.6-percent of the vote as an Independent write-in candidate.

In 2022 Pierson was appointed to the Deer Lodge City Council.
