= Mike Yakawich =

American politician

Member of the Montana Senate from the 24th district
- Incumbent
- Assumed office January 6, 2025
- Preceded by: Emma Kerr-Carpenter

Member of the Montana House of Representatives from the 51st district
- In office April 19, 2022 – January 6, 2025
- Preceded by: Frank Fleming
- Succeeded by: Jodee Etchart

Personal details
- Born: Michael Yakawich
- Party: Republican
- Spouse: Yukiko
- Children: 5
- Education: University of Montana (BA)

Michael "Mike" Yakawich is an American politician who represents the 24th Senate District in the Montana State Senate. Yakawich served in the Montana House of Representatives representing the 51st House District after being appointed to fill a vacancy in 2022. He held the seat from 2022 to 2024 after winning reelection.

== Early life and education ==
Yakawich is a native of Butte, Montana. He earned a Bachelor of Arts degree in psychology from the University of Montana in 1980 and graduated from the Unification Theological Seminary in 1987.

== Career ==
From 1995 to 2018, Yakawich operated a small business, Yakawich Gifts. From 2014 to 2022, he served as a member of the Billings City Council. Yakawich also worked as a regional director of the Global Peace Foundation. On April 19, 2022, members of the Yellowstone County Board of Commissioners appointed Yakawich to succeed Frank Fleming in the Montana House of Representatives.

== Personal life ==
Yakawich was raised Catholic and joined the Unification Church in 1979. He and his wife, Yukiko, have five children. He is a pastor at the Montana Family Church, a congregation affiliated with the Family Federation for World Peace and Unification.
