= Don Ryan =

American politician

Member of the Montana Senate from the 10th district
- In office 2001–2009
- Succeeded by: Bradley Maxon Hamlett

Personal details
- Born: December 21, 1951 (age 74) Great Falls, Montana
- Party: Democratic Party
- Spouse: Terri
- Education: University of Montana
- Occupation: educator, daycare owner

Don Ryan was a Democratic Party member of the Montana Senate, representing District 10 since 2000.
