= Kathy Whitman =

American politician

Member of the Montana House of Representatives from the 96th district
- In office January 4, 2021 – January 2, 2023
- Preceded by: Tom Winter
- Succeeded by: Jonathan Karlen

Personal details
- Born: Kathy Joann Griffin; 1952 (age 73–74) Havre, Montana, U.S.
- Party: Republican
- Spouse: Mike
- Children: Three
- Education: University of Montana
- Occupation: Business owner

Kathy Joann Whitman (née Griffin; born January 1952) is an American businesswoman and politician. She served as a member of the Montana House of Representatives from the 96th district, which encompasses Missoula, Frenchtown and Huson, for the Republican Party from 2021 to 2023. During the 2022 Montana House of Representatives election, she was defeated by Democrat Jonathan Karlen.
