= Jodee Etchart =

American politician

Member of the Montana House of Representatives
- Incumbent
- Assumed office January 6, 2025
- Preceded by: Mike Yakawich
- Constituency: 51st district
- In office January 2, 2023 – January 6, 2025
- Preceded by: Jessica Karjala
- Succeeded by: Curtis Schomer
- Constituency: 48th district

Personal details
- Party: Republican
- Website: Campaign website

Jodee Etchart is an American politician. She serves as a Republican member for the 48th district of the Montana House of Representatives.
