= Lola Sheldon-Galloway =

American politician

Member of the Montana House of Representatives from the 22 district
- Incumbent
- Assumed office January 2, 2017
- Preceded by: Robert Mehlhoff

Personal details
- Born: 1959 (age 66–67) Great Falls, Montana
- Party: Republican
- Spouse: Steven Galloway
- Children: 6
- Education: Montana State University
- Website: lolasheldongalloway.com

Lola Sheldon-Galloway is a Montana politician who formerly served in the Montana House of Representatives.

Lola was born in 1959 in Great Falls, Montana. She attended Montana State University in 2010. Her husband Steven Galloway was elected to the state House of Representatives in 2020 and served through 2025. They both have six children.
