= Gregory Frazer =

American politician

Member of the Montana House of Representatives from the 78th district
- Incumbent
- Assumed office January 4, 2021
- Preceded by: Gordon Pierson

Personal details
- Born: 1983 (age 42–43) Clovis, New Mexico
- Party: Republican
- Children: 3
- Occupation: Mental health technician

Military service
- Branch/service: United States Army
- Years of service: 2000–2008
- Unit: United States Army Reserve

Gregory L. Frazer is an American politician serving as a member of the Montana House of Representatives from the 78th district. Elected in November 2020, he assumed office on January 4, 2021.

== Background ==
After graduating from high school, Frazer joined the United States Army Reserve, serving from 2000 to 2008. He has since worked as a corrections officer for the Montana State Prison. Frazer was elected to the Montana House of Representatives in November 2020 and assumed office on January 4, 2021, succeeding Gordon Pierson.
