= Kelly Kortum =

American politician

Member of the Montana House of Representatives from the 65th district
- Incumbent
- Assumed office January 4, 2021
- Preceded by: Christopher Pope

Personal details
- Born: Ekalaka, Montana
- Party: Democratic
- Education: Montana State University (BS)

Kelly Kortum is an American politician serving as a member of the Montana House of Representatives from the 65th district. Elected in November 2020, he assumed office on January 4, 2021.

== Background ==
Kortum was raised in Ekalaka, Montana and earned a Bachelor of Science degree in computer science from Montana State University. Kortum has also worked in construction and as a firefighter, He is the founder of the Gallatin Progressive Action Network. Kortum was elected to the Montana House of Representatives in November 2020 and assumed office on January 4, 2021.
