= Terry Moore (politician) =

American politician

Member of the Montana House of Representatives from the 54th district
- Incumbent
- Assumed office January 7, 2019
- Preceded by: Jeff Essmann

Personal details
- Born: May 25, 1952 (age 74) Billings, Montana, U.S.
- Party: Republican
- Education: Montana State University (BS)

Terry Moore (born May 25, 1952) is an American politician serving as a member of the Montana House of Representatives from the 54th district. Elected in November 2018, he assumed office on January 7, 2019.

== Early life and education ==
Born and raised in Billings, Montana, Moore earned a Bachelor of Science degree in business with a concentration in accounting from Montana State University.

== Career ==
Moore worked as the chief financial officer of First Interstate Bank. He was also a manager at KPMG. Moore was elected to the Montana House of Representatives in November 2018 and assumed office on January 7, 2019, succeeding Jeff Essmann.
