= David Dunn (Montana politician) =

American politician

Member of the Montana House of Representatives from the 9th district
- In office January 7, 2019 – January 4, 2021
- Preceded by: Randy Brodehl
- Succeeded by: Brian Putnam

Personal details
- Party: Republican
- Occupation: Politician
- Website: dunnforhd9.com

David Dunn is a Montana politician, and recently served in the Montana House of Representatives.

== See also ==
- Montana House of Representatives, District 9
