= Fred Anderson (Montana politician) =

American educator and politician

Member of the Montana House of Representatives from the 20th district
- In office January 2, 2017 – January 6, 2025
- Preceded by: Steve Fitzpatrick
- Succeeded by: Melissa Nikolakakos

Personal details
- Born: July 16, 1944 (age 82) Bozeman, Montana, U.S.
- Party: Republican
- Spouse: Vicky Anderson
- Children: 3
- Education: Northern Montana College (BS); Colorado State University (MA, PhD)
- Website: Campaign website

Military service
- Allegiance: United States
- Branch/service: Montana Army National Guard

Fred Anderson (born July 16, 1944) is an American educator and politician. He serves as a Republican member of the Montana House of Representatives, where he represents District 20, including parts of Great Falls, Montana.

== Early life ==
On July 16, 1944, Anderson was born in Bozeman, Montana.

== Education ==
In 1967, Anderson earned a Bachelor of Science degree in broadfield science with minors in chemistry and automotive technology from Northern Montana College. In 1979, Anderson earned a MEd in Vocational Administration from Colorado State University. In 1980, Anderson earned a PhD in Administration and Supervision from Colorado State University.

== Career ==
In military, Anderson served in the Montana Army National Guard.

Anderson is a cattle rancher in Montana.

In 1968, Anderson became a teacher at Miles Community College, until 1978. In 1979, Anderson became an Assistant Principal in Miles City, Montana. In 1982, Anderson became a Principal in Great Falls, Montana.

In 2014, Anderson ran for election to represent the 24th district, but lost the general election to Democrat Jean Price by 23 votes.

On November 8, 2016, Anderson won the election and became a Republican member of Montana House of Representatives for District 20. Anderson defeated Amy Rapp with 71.03% of the votes.

On November 6, 2018, as an incumbent, Anderson won the election and continued serving District 20. Anderson defeated Keaton Sunchild with 68.48% of the votes.

While Anderson was a Principal of Custer County District High School from 1982-2002, James Jensen, an athletic trainer, was allegedly sexually abused students there. In 2019, Anderson faced pressure from a county Republican leader to resign from his legislative position.

== Awards ==
- 2019 Champion of Business award. Presented by Montana Chamber of Commerce.
- 2019 Silver Windmill award. Presented by Montana Farm Bureau.

== Election history ==
=== 2014 ===
2014 general election: Montana House of Representatives, District 24
Party	Candidate	Votes	%
Democratic	Jean Price	1,577	50.4%
Republican	Fred Anderson	1,554	49.6%

=== 2016 ===
2016 Republican primary: Montana House of Representatives, District 20
Party	Candidate	Votes	%
Republican	Fred Anderson	1,386	57.46%
Republican	Sheridan Buck	1,026	42.54%

2016 general election: Montana House of Representatives, District 20
Party	Candidate	Votes	%
Republican	Fred Anderson	3,985	71.03%
Democratic	Amy Rapp	1,625	28.97%

=== 2018 ===
2018 general election: Montana House of Representatives, District 20
Party	Candidate	Votes	%
Republican	Fred Anderson	3,826	68.5%
Democratic	Keaton Sunchild	1,761	31.5%

== Personal life ==
Anderson's wife is Vicky Anderson. They have 3 children. Anderson and his family live in Great Falls, Montana.

In 2018, Anderson underwent a kidney transplant in Arizona. Anderson received a kidney from Jim Ross, a former U.S. Navy pilot and a friend.
