= Seth Berglee =

American politician

Seth Berglee is an American politician. He serves as a Republican member of the Montana House of Representatives.

Berglee was born in Brockton, Montana and attended Montana State University and Ohio State University, studying zoology. He currently resides in Silesia, Montana and practices Christianity.
