= Steven Galloway (politician) =

American politician

Member of the Montana House of Representatives from the 24th district
- In office January 4, 2021 – January 6, 2025
- Preceded by: Barbara Bessette
- Succeeded by: Steve Fitzpatrick

Personal details
- Born: 1959 (age 66–67)
- Party: Republican
- Spouse: Lola Sheldon-Galloway

Steven Galloway is an American politician who served as a Republican member of the Montana House of Representatives for the 24th district from 2021 to 2025. He was a member of the Montana Freedom Caucus.
