= Danny Tenenbaum =

American politician

Member of the Montana House of Representatives from the 95th district
- In office January 4, 2021 – January 2, 2023
- Preceded by: Shane Morigeau
- Succeeded by: SJ Howell

Personal details
- Party: Democratic
- Education: University of Wisconsin–Madison (BA); New York University (JD)

Danny Tenenbaum is an American attorney and politician serving as a member of the Montana House of Representatives from the 95th district. Elected in November 2020, he assumed office on January 4, 2021.

== Education ==
Tenenbaum earned a Bachelor of Arts degree in history from the University of Wisconsin–Madison and a Juris Doctor from the New York University School of Law.

== Career ==
After earning his bachelor's degree, Tenenbaum worked as an overseas refugee officer with the Department of Homeland Security. After graduating from law school in 2015, he and his wife moved from New York City to Missoula, Montana, where he works as a public defender. Tenenbaum was elected to the Montana House of Representatives in November 2020. He assumed office on January 4, 2021, succeeding Shane Morigeau.
