= Brian Putnam =

American politician

Member of the Montana House of Representatives from the 9th district
- In office January 4, 2021 – January 1, 2023
- Preceded by: David Dunn

Personal details
- Born: 1970 (age 55–56) Miles City, Montana
- Party: Republican
- Children: Two
- Education: Montana State University (BS)
- Occupation: Engineer

Brian Putnam is an American politician from Montana. He was a Republican member of the Montana House of Representatives for District 9.
