= Tom France =

American politician

Member of the Montana House of Representatives from the 94th district
- Incumbent
- Assumed office January 4, 2021
- Preceded by: Kimberly Dudik

Personal details
- Born: June 15, 1951 (age 75) Minneapolis, Minnesota, U.S.
- Party: Democratic
- Education: University of Montana (BA, JD)

Thomas France (born June 15, 1951) is an American attorney and politician serving as a member of the Montana House of Representatives from the 94th district. Elected in November 2020, he assumed office on January 4, 2021.

== Early life and education ==
France was born in Minneapolis, Minnesota. He earned a Bachelor of Arts degree in history and political science and a Juris Doctor from the University of Montana.

== Career ==
France joined the National Wildlife Federation in 1981 as a staff attorney. He has since worked as regional executive director of the Northern Rockies, Prairies, and Pacific Regional Center. He was elected to the Montana House of Representatives in November 2020. He assumed office on January 4, 2021, succeeding Kimberly Dudik.
