= Geraldine Custer =

American politician (born 1955)

Member of the Montana House of Representatives from the 39th district
- In office January 5, 2015 – January 2, 2023
- Preceded by: Lee Randall
- Succeeded by: Gary Parry

Personal details
- Born: January 1, 1955 (age 71) Miles City, Montana
- Party: Republican
- Children: Two
- Education: Eastern Montana College

Geraldine Custer (born January 1, 1955) is an American politician who served in the Montana House of Representatives from the 39th district from 2015 to 2023. In 2022 Custer ran for Senate District 20, ultimately losing to Barry Usher in the primary.

== Early life ==
Custer was born in Miles City, Montana, and graduated Melstone High School in 1973. She attended Eastern Montana College, and later served as the county clerk and recorder of Rosebud County, Montana, for thirty-five years.

== Montana House of Representatives ==
Custer was elected to the Montana House of Representatives in 2014, and assumed office in January 2015.

== Personal life ==
Custer resides in Forsyth, Montana. She has two daughters, Amy and Arica.
