= Sara Novak =

American politician

Member of the Montana Senate from the 36th district
- Incumbent
- Assumed office January 4, 2025
- Preceded by: Jeffrey Welborn

Member of the Montana House of Representatives from the 2nd district
- In office January 4, 2021 – January 2, 2023
- Preceded by: Mark Sweeney
- Succeeded by: John Fitzpatrick

Personal details
- Born: 1978 (age 47–48) Butte, Montana, U.S.
- Party: Democratic
- Spouse: Daren
- Children: 3
- Education: University of Montana Western (BS); Montana State University–Northern (MEd)

Sara Novak is an American educator and politician who is currently serving as a Democratic member of the Montana State Senate from the 36th district. She also previously served as a member of the Montana House of Representatives from the 77th district. She was first elected in November 2020.

== Early life and education ==
Novak was born and raised in Butte, Montana. After graduating from Butte High School in 1996, she earned a Bachelor of Science degree in education from the University of Montana Western and a Master of Education in counseling from Montana State University–Northern.

== Career ==
Novak has worked as a special education teacher in Anaconda, Montana. She is also the special education director for Great Divide Education Services, an education cooperative based in Deer Lodge, Montana.

Novak was elected to the Montana House of Representatives in November 2020 and assumed office on January 4, 2021. She was the Democratic nominee for the 77th district in 2022, but lost to Republican John Fitzpatrick in an upset; the margin between the two was only 47.

She was elected to the Montana Senate in 2024, to serve in the 36th district.
