= Bob Phalen =

American politician

Member of the Montana House of Representatives from the 36th district
- Incumbent
- Assumed office January 4, 2021
- Preceded by: Alan Doane

Personal details
- Party: Republican
- Occupation: Politician

Bob Phalen is an American politician in the Montana Senate. He was a Republican member of the Montana House of Representatives for district 36. Bob Phalen is also a farmer from eastern Montana. He is a member of the Montana Freedom Caucus.

In 2025, Phalen introduced a resolution which called for the U.S. Supreme Court to overturn Obergefell v. Hodges and define marriage as between a man and a woman.

== Montana State Legislature ==
=== 2020 State House of Representatives election ===
Montana's 36th District House of Representatives Primary Election, 2020
Party	Candidate	Votes	%
Republican	Bob Phalen	2,100	66.73
Republican	Jim Johnson	427	13.57
Republican	Jason Stuart	421	13.38
Republican	Charles J. Peterson Jr.	199	6.32
Total votes		3,147	100

Phalen was uncontested in the general election, having received 4,728 votes.

=== 2022 State House of Representatives Election ===
Phalen ran uncontested in the primary, having received 1,924 votes.

He also ran uncontested in the general election, receiving 3,281 votes.
