= Rhonda Knudsen =

American politician

Speaker pro tempore of the Montana House of Representatives
- In office January 2, 2023 – January 6, 2025
- Preceded by: Casey Knudsen
- Succeeded by: Katie Zolnikov

Member of the Montana House of Representatives from the 34th district
- Incumbent
- Assumed office January 7, 2019
- Preceded by: Austin Knudsen

Personal details
- Born: 1960 (age 65–66) Culbertson, Montana, U.S.
- Citizenship: American; Turtle Mountain Band of Chippewa Indians
- Party: Republican
- Children: 2, including Austin
- Education: Montana State University; Helena College University of Montana (AS)

Rhonda Knudsen (born 1960) is an American politician and retired civil engineer serving as a member of the Montana House of Representatives from the 34th district. Elected in 2019, Knudsen succeeded her son, House Speaker Austin Knudsen.

== Early life and education ==
Knudsen was born and raised in Culbertson, Montana. She earned a Bachelor of Science degree from Montana State University.

== Career ==
Prior to entering politics, Knudsen worked as a civil engineer for the Natural Resources Conservation Service and Bureau of Indian Affairs. Knudsen was elected to the Montana House of Representatives in 2018 took office in 2019, succeeding her son, House Speaker Austin Knudsen, who was unable to seek re-election due to term limits and later announced his candidacy for Attorney General of Montana in the 2020 election.

== Personal life ==
Knudsen and her husband have two children, including Austin.

She is a member of the Turtle Mountain Band of Chippewa Indians.

Montana House of Representatives
Preceded by Casey Knudsen	Speaker pro tempore of the Montana House of Representatives; 2023–2025	Succeeded by Katie Zolnikov
