= Kenneth Holmlund =

American politician

Member of the Montana House of Representatives from the 38th district
- In office January 5, 2015 – January 2, 2023
- Preceded by: Alan Doane
- Succeeded by: Greg Kmetz

Kenneth Holmlund is an American politician. He is a Republican who represented District 38 in the Montana House of Representatives from 2015 to 2023.

== Political career ==
Holmlund was first elected to represent District 38 in 2014.

Holmlund chaired the Natural Resources and Transportation committee, and was also a member of the Appropriations committee.

Holmlund is an opponent of Sanctuary cities. He has sponsored legislation to Ban Sanctuary cities in Montana twice, once in 2019 and again in 2021. His 2021 bill passed on April 1, 2021 when Governor Greg Gianforte signed the bill that bans Sanctuary cities in the state of Montana into law.

=== Electoral record ===
2018 general election: Montana House of Representatives, District 38
Party	Candidate	Votes	%
Republican	Kenneth Holmlund	2,576	67.7%
Democratic	Bert Pezzarossi	1,231	32.3%

2016 general election: Montana House of Representatives, District 38
Party	Candidate	Votes	%
Republican	Kenneth Holmlund	2,255	54.06%
Democratic	Steve Muggli	1,916	45.94%

2014 general election: Montana House of Representatives, District 38
Party	Candidate	Votes	%
Republican	Kenneth Holmlund	1,709	53.3%
Democratic	Steve Muggli	{{{votes}}}	46.7%
