= Rynalea Whiteman Pena =

American politician and tribal leader

Member of the Montana House of Representatives from the 41st district
- In office January 4, 2021 – January 2, 2023
- Preceded by: Rae Peppers
- Succeeded by: Paul Green

Personal details
- Party: Democratic
- Education: Chief Dull Knife College, (AA)

Rynalea Whiteman Pena is an American politician and tribal leader. She served as a member of the Montana House of Representatives from the 41st district. Elected in November 2020, she assumed office on January 4, 2021.

== Early life and education ==
Whiteman Pena was raised in Lame Deer, Montana. She earned an associate of arts degree in early childhood education from Chief Dull Knife College.

== Career ==
Prior to entering politics, Whiteman Pena worked as a transportation manager. In a 2019 special election, she was elected as tribal president of the Northern Cheyenne Tribe, replacing Jace Killsback who resigned from the position in October 2018. As president, she managed the reservation response to the COVID-19 pandemic. She petitioned the Montana Congressional delegation to formally investigate neglect by Bureau of Indian Affairs Law Enforcement in response to the Missing and Murdered Indigenous Women crisis.

She was elected to the Montana House of Representatives in November 2020 and assumed office on January 4, 2021, succeeding Rae Peppers, who had vacated her office to run for Montana State Senate. While in the house, Whiteman Pena was on the House Legislative Administration Committee, the Transportation Committee, the Agriculture Committee, and the Business and Labor Committee. She was one of twelve Montana congresspeople on the 2021 Montana American Indian Caucus.

In 2022, she lost re-election to Montana State House District 41 to Paul Green, a Republican, 43.1%-56.9%, with 930 votes to Green's 1,230.

== Personal life ==
Whiteman Pena lost her brother to COVID-19 in 2020. In 2021, her niece, Deanna Limberhand, was found dead in Stillwater River. Though the official cause of death was drowning, Whiteman Pena and her family suspected foul play, as Limberhand was found badly beaten and hogtied.

== See also ==
- List of Native American politicians
- Native American women in politics
