= Frank Fleming (politician) =

American politician (1953–2022)

Member of the Montana House of Representatives from the 51st district
- In office January 30, 2018 – March 6, 2022
- Preceded by: Adam Rosendale
- Succeeded by: Mike Yakawich

Personal details
- Born: December 11, 1953 Great Falls, Montana, U.S.
- Died: March 6, 2022 (aged 68)
- Party: Republican
- Education: Eastern Montana College (BA, MEd)

Frank Richard Fleming (December 11, 1953 – March 6, 2022) was an American politician who served as a member of the Montana House of Representatives from the 51st district. He was appointed to the House on January 30, 2018, succeeding Adam Rosendale.

== Early life and education ==
Fleming was born in Great Falls, Montana, on December 11, 1953, and graduated from Great Falls High School in 1972. He earned a Bachelor of Arts degree in education and political science and a Master of Education with an emphasis in public administration from Montana State University Billings, then known as Eastern Montana College.

== Career ==
Prior to entering politics, Fleming worked as a corrections officer for the Montana Department of Corrections. He was appointed to the Montana House of Representatives on January 30, 2018, succeeding Adam Rosendale.

== Death ==
In January 2022, Fleming announced he would not seek re-election that year for health reasons. He died after a long illness on March 6, 2022, at the age of 68.
