= David Bedey =

American politician

Member of the Montana House of Representatives from the 86th district
- Incumbent
- Assumed office January 7, 2019
- Preceded by: Ron Ehli

Personal details
- Born: 1954 (age 71–72) Hamilton, Montana
- Party: Republican
- Spouse: Deborah Bedey
- Children: 1
- Education: University of Alaska Fairbanks, (Ph.D); Naval War College, (MA); Montana State University, (BS)
- Website: DavidBedey.com

Military service
- Allegiance: United States
- Branch/service: United States Army
- Years of service: 1978–2008
- Rank: Colonel

David Bedey (born 1954) is an American politician who serves in the Montana House of Representatives, representing the 86th district since 2019. On February 5, 2025, Representative Bedey was one of six Republicans that voted against a resolution to congratulate Donald Trump on his re-election (HJ7).
