= Kenneth Walsh (politician) =

American politician (born 1954)

Member of the Montana House of Representatives
- Incumbent
- Assumed office January 4, 2021
- Preceded by: Ray Shaw
- Constituency: 71st (2021–2025); 69th (2025–present)

Personal details
- Born: 1954 (age 71–72) Stockton, California, U.S.
- Party: Republican
- Spouse: Mary Beth Walsh
- Children: 2
- Education: Montana State University (BS, MS)
- Occupation: Rancher

Kenneth M. Walsh is an American politician serving as a member of the Montana House of Representatives, initially from the 71st district and later the 69th district. Elected in November 2020, he assumed office on January 4, 2021.

== Early life and education ==
Walsh was born in Stockton, California. He earned a bachelor's and master's degree from Montana State University.

== Career ==
Prior to entering politics, Walsh was the CEO of Ruby Valley Bank. He was also the manager of the Northern International Livestock Exposition and Rodeo. Walsh was elected to the Montana House of Representatives in November 2020 and assumed office on January 4, 2021. Walsh lives in Twin Bridges, Montana.

== Electoral history ==
=== 2020 ===
2020 Montana House of Representatives 71st district Republican primary
Party	Candidate	Votes	%
Republican	Kenneth Walsh	2,482	75.69%
Republican	Cindy Younkin	797	24.31%
Total votes		3,279	100.00%

2020 Montana House of Representatives 71st district general election
Party	Candidate	Votes	%
Republican	Kenneth Walsh	5,653	74.40%
Democratic	Ian Root	1,945	25.60%
Total votes		7,598	100.00%
Republican hold			

=== 2022 ===
2022 Montana House of Representatives 71st district Republican primary
Party	Candidate	Votes	%
Republican	Kenneth Walsh (incumbent)	2,474	100.00%

2022 Montana House of Representatives 71st district general election
Party	Candidate	Votes	%
Republican	Kenneth Walsh (incumbent)	5,215	100.00%
Republican hold			

=== 2024 ===
2024 Montana House of Representatives 69th district general election
Party	Candidate	Votes	%
Republican	Kenneth Walsh (incumbent)	6,222	100.00%
Total votes		6,222	100.00%
Republican hold			

=== 2026 ===
2026 Montana House of Representatives 69th district Republican primary
Party	Candidate	Votes	%
Republican	Trevor Walter	1,658	53.11%
Republican	Kenneth Walsh (incumbent)	1,464	46.89%
Total votes		3,122	100.00%
Majority		194	6.21%
