= Mary Ann Dunwell =

American politician from Montana

Member of the Montana Senate from the 42nd district
- Incumbent
- Assumed office January 5, 2015
- Preceded by: Jill Cohenour

Member of the Montana House of Representatives from the 84th district
- In office January 5, 2015 – January 2, 2023
- Preceded by: Steve Gibson
- Succeeded by: Jill Cohenour

Personal details
- Born: 1954 (age 71–72) Wilmington, Delaware, U.S.
- Party: Democratic
- Children: 1

Mary Ann Dunwell is an American politician in the Montana Senate. She served as a Democratic member of the Montana House of Representatives for District 84.

== Early life ==
Dunwell was born in 1954 in Wilmington, Delaware. She earned a Bachelor of Arts in speech and communications.

== Montana House of Representatives ==
Dunwell was elected to the Montana House of Representatives in 2014, and assumed office in January 2015.

== Personal life ==
Dunwell lives in Helena, Montana. She has one son.
