= Scot Kerns =

American theologian

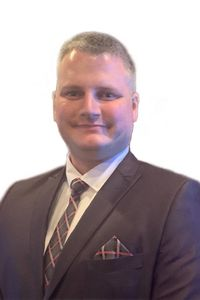

Member of the Montana House of Representatives from the 23rd district
- In office January 4, 2021 – June 30, 2024
- Preceded by: Bradley Maxon Hamlett
- Succeeded by: Eric Tilleman

Personal details
- Born: September 26, 1986 (age 39)
- Party: Republican
- Parents: Douglas Scot Kerns; Laurie Elizabeth Hensley
- Education: Concordia University Chicago, BA Theology, 2009; Concordia Theological Seminary, MA Divinity, 2013

Military service
- Allegiance: United States
- Branch/service: United States Air Force
- Years of service: 2005-2006 (Active); 2010-2018 (Reserve); 2018-2020 (Active)
- Rank: Captain

Douglas Scot Kerns II, also known as Scot Kerns, is a Lutheran pastor and Republican politician who was born in Indianapolis, Indiana. He represented House District 23 of the Montana State Legislature and a served as a candidate minister in Great Falls, Montana.

== Early life ==
Kerns attained the Eagle Scout award in Boy Scouts.

== Education ==
Kerns attended Randolph-Macon Academy military boarding school in Virginia, then received a BA in Theology from Concordia University Chicago in 2009 and an MA in Divinity from Concordia Theological Seminary in Fort Wayne, Indiana, in 2013.

== Career ==
Kerns has been a guest pastor ten times on KFUO radio. Kerns once served as the "guest chaplain of the day" in the Kansas Senate. He has served as chaplain of the fire department in Vaughn, Montana, and the pastor of a church near Lincoln, Kansas.

== Montana State Legislature ==
During the 2021 legislative session, Kerns served on the Taxation, Education, and Local Government Committees.

In 2022, Kerns was convicted of driving under the influence (DUI), obstructing a peace officer, and unlawful possession of an open alcoholic beverage in a motor vehicle. He was found asleep in his parked vehicle with an open container.

During the 2023 legislative session, Kerns introduced House Bill 704, which sought to allow certain first-time DUI convictions to be expunged. The bill applied to cases where the person was found inside a non-moving vehicle, had not been involved in an accident, and met other criteria suggesting the vehicle was not in motion. Kerns stated the bill was partially inspired by his own experience and intended to provide individuals with a chance for a clean record in low-risk cases.

Kerns resigned from the Montana House in June 2024 in order to move to Pennsylvania to become the pastor of a Lutheran congregation there.

== Personal life ==
Kerns resided in Great Falls, Montana.

== Electoral history ==
Montana’s 23rd District House of Representatives election, 2020
Party	Candidate	Votes	%
Republican	Scot Kerns	2,079	51.3
Democratic	Brad Hamlett	1,972	48.7
Total votes		4,051	100
