= Jessica Karjala =

American politician (born 1965)

Member of the Montana House of Representatives from the 48th district
- In office January 5, 2015 – January 2, 2023
- Preceded by: Douglas Kary
- Succeeded by: Jodee Etchart

Personal details
- Born: November 17, 1965 (age 60)
- Party: Democratic
- Education: University of Montana

Jessica Karjala (born November 17, 1965) is an American politician who served as a Democratic member of the Montana House of Representatives, representing the 48th district.

== Political career ==
Karjala served as vice chair of House Human Services Committee in: 2017, 2019 and 2021. She served on the State Administration and Veterans Affairs Committee for four sessions. Karjala left the legislature in January 2023.

== Electoral record ==
2014 general election: Montana House of Representatives, District 48
Party	Candidate	Votes	%
Democratic	Jessica Karjala	1,889	52.3%
Republican	Dennis Lenz	1,720	47.7%

2016 general election: Montana House of Representatives, District 48
Party	Candidate	Votes	%
Democratic	Jessica Karjala	2,551	55.12%
Republican	Robert Saunders	2,077	44.88%

2018 general election: Montana House of Representatives, District 48
Party	Candidate	Votes	%
Democratic	Jessica Karjala	2,465	54.3%
Republican	Denise Johnson	2,072	45.7%
