= Willis Curdy =

American politician

Member of the Montana House of Representatives from the 98th district
- In office January 5, 2015 – January 2, 2023
- Preceded by: Jenifer Gursky
- Succeeded by: Bob Carter

Personal details
- Born: October 30, 1947 (age 78) Bitterroot Valley
- Party: Democratic
- Spouse: Gloria Curdy
- Children: 2
- Education: University of Montana
- Profession: Businessman, teacher

Willis Curdy (born October 30, 1947) is an American politician in the Montana Senate. He served as a Democratic member for the 98th district in the Montana House of Representatives from 2015 to 2023.

Curdy was born in Bitterroot Valley in 1947 and currently resides in Missoula, Montana. He also attended the University of Montana, once from 1967 to 1971, and once in 1987.
