= Jennifer Carlson =

American politician

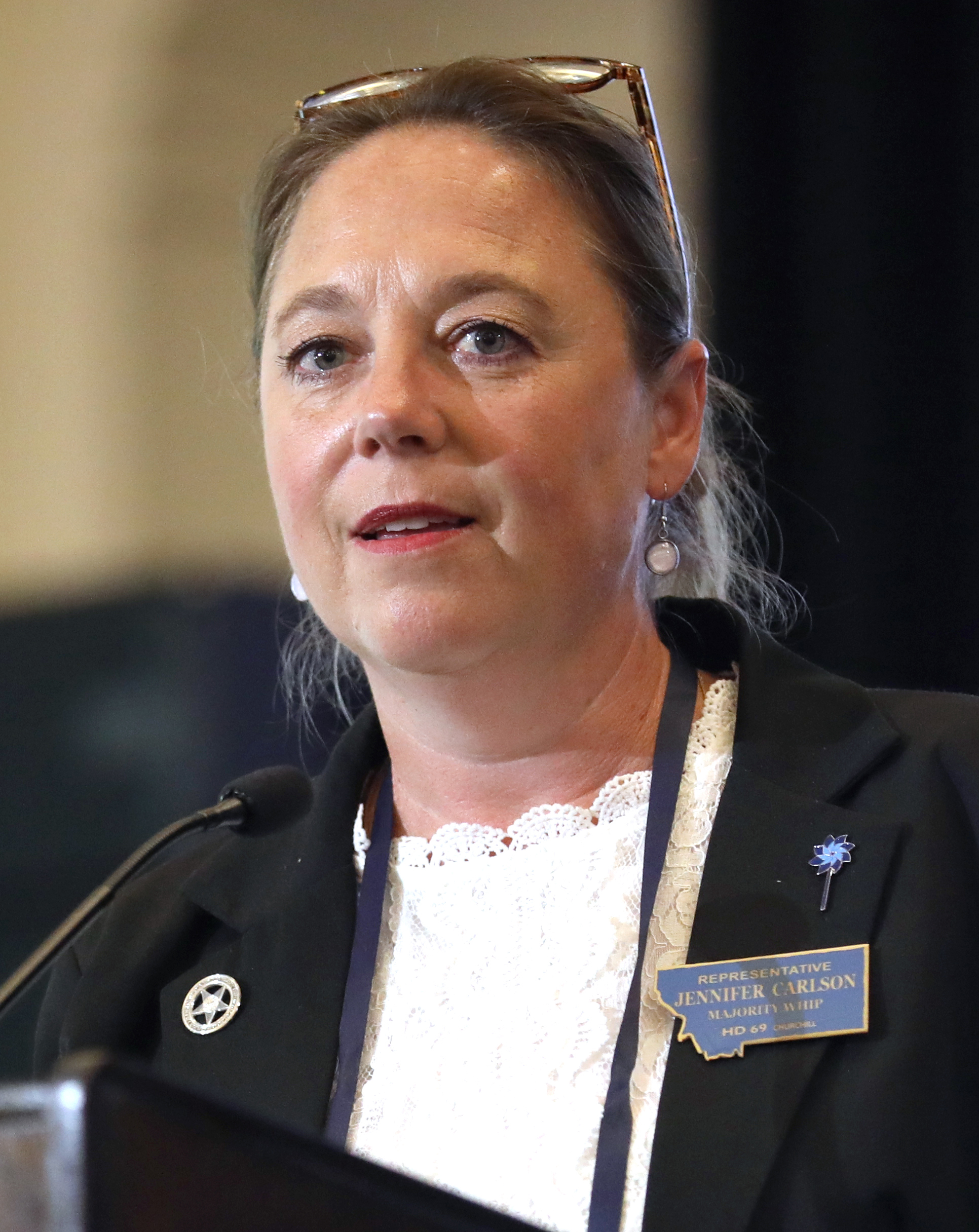

Member of the Montana House of Representatives from the 69th district
- Incumbent
- Assumed office January 4, 2021
- Preceded by: Walt Sales

Personal details
- Born: Montana, U.S.
- Party: Republican
- Children: 5
- Education: Montana State University (BS)

Jennifer Carlson is an American politician serving as a member of the Montana House of Representatives from the 69th district. Elected in November 2020, she assumed office on January 4, 2021.

== Background ==
Carlson was born and raised in Montana. She earned a Bachelor of Science degree in biomedical sciences from Montana State University. Carlson and her husband, Don, have five children and live in Churchill, Montana. She was elected to the Montana House of Representatives in November 2020 and assumed office on January 4, 2021.
