= Jasmine Krotkov =

American politician

Member of the Montana House of Representatives from the 25th district
- In office January 7, 2019 – January 4, 2021
- Preceded by: Jeremy Trebas
- Succeeded by: Steve Gist

Personal details
- Born: September 30, 1963 (age 62)
- Party: Democratic
- Education: Bard College at Simon's Rock (AA); World College West (BA)

Jasmine Krotkov (born September 30, 1963) is an American politician who served as a member of the Montana House of Representatives for the 25th district from 2019 to 2021. Elected in 2018, she assumed office on January 7, 2019.

== Early life and education ==
She earned an associate degree in political systems from Bard College at Simon's Rock and a Bachelor of Arts degree in AgroEcology from World College West. Krotkov also earned a certificate in graphic design from the California Institute of the Arts and another in horticulture from the University of California, Berkeley.

== Career ==
From 1993 to 2014, Krotkov was an employee of the United States Postal Service. She also worked as a board member, legislative director and Editor of the United Postmasters and Managers of America. Krotkov has also worked as a landscape designer. Krotkov was elected to the Montana House of Representatives in 2018 and assumed office on January 7, 2019.
