= Becky Beard =

American politician

Member of the Montana House of Representatives from the 80th district
- Incumbent
- Assumed office January 2, 2017
- Preceded by: Mike Miller

Personal details
- Born: June 22, 1960 (age 66) Lewistown, Montana, U.S.
- Party: Republican
- Spouse: Alden Beard
- Children: Jessica
- Education: Carroll College, (BA)
- Occupation: Business owner

Becky Beard (born June 22, 1960) is an American politician in the Montana Senate. She served in the Montana House of Representatives from the 80th district since 2017.
