= Moffie Funk =

American politician

Member of the Montana House of Representatives from the 5th district
- Incumbent
- Assumed office January 5th, 2015
- Preceded by: Liz Bangerter

Personal details
- Party: Democratic
- Education: University of California, Berkeley (BA)

Moffie Funk is an American politician serving as a Democratic member of the Montana House of Representatives for District 82, focusing on education, labor, and economy in the legislature. In 2014, she was named the Montana History Teacher of the Year.

Funk's legislative committee assignments have included Business and Labor, Agriculture, and Education, which she has been the Vice chair of since the 2017 legislative session.

== Early career ==
Funk grew up mostly overseas, in Iraq, Sudan, Tanzania, and Italy. She also grew up partially in Washington, D.C. before attending University of California, Berkeley, where she received a Bachelor of Arts in Political Science. She received a teaching license from Carroll College in Helena, Montana, after which she worked as a middle school social studies teacher in Montana and joined the teachers' union. After she was named the Montana History Teacher of the Year in 2014, she helped write a new social studies textbook for Montana students.

After Funk retired from teaching full-time, she joined the executive board of the Montana Federation of Public Employees and founded an advocacy group to raise awareness of attempts to divert public education funding to private, for-profit schools.

== Political career ==
In 2014, Funk was elected to the Montana House of Representatives, defeating incumbent Liz Bangerter. Funk has since focused on legislation supporting public education, unions, and labor in general. Her 2014 campaign website focused on the following topics: education quality and funding; Montana's outdoor beauty and natural resources; healthcare, including women's healthcare access and Medicaid expansion; equal rights and anti-discrimination; and labor. She was reelected three times and will hit term limits for the Montana House in 2023, after her final term.

Funk has served on the following committees per legislative session:

- 2015: Education, Local Government, State Administration
- 2017: Education (Vice chair), Business and Labor, Agriculture
- 2019: Education (Vice chair), Business and Labor, Agriculture
- 2021: Education (Vice chair), Business and Labor, Agriculture

In July 2021, Funk was named the Interim Party Executive Director of the Montana Democrats.

== Electoral history ==
Moffie Funk electoral history

2014 Montana House of Representatives 82nd district election
Party	Candidate	Votes	%	±%
Democratic	Moffie Funk	'2,179;	52.5%	
Republican	Liz Bangerter (incumbent)	1,973	47.5%	
Total votes		4,152	100.00%	

2016 Montana House of Representatives 82nd district election
Party	Candidate	Votes	%	±%
Democratic	Moffie Funk (incumbent)	-	100.00%	
Total votes		-	100.00%	

2018 Montana House of Representatives 82nd district election
Party	Candidate	Votes	%	±%
Democratic	Moffie Funk (incumbent)	3,892	100.00%	
Total votes		3,892	100.00%	

2020 Montana House of Representatives 82nd district election
Party	Candidate	Votes	%	±%
Democratic	Moffie Funk (incumbent)	3,446	55.9%	
Republican	Debbie Westlake	2,717	44.1%	
Total votes		6,162	100.00%	
