= Bradley Maxon Hamlett =

American legislator

Member of the Montana House of Representatives from the 23rd district
- In office 2017–2021
- Preceded by: Wendy McKamey
- Succeeded by: Scot Kerns

Member of the Montana Senate from the 15th district 10th (2009–2013)
- In office 2009–2017
- Preceded by: Don Ryan
- Succeeded by: Ryan Osmundson

Personal details
- Party: Democratic

Bradley Maxon Hamlett was a Democratic member of the Montana Legislature. He was elected to Senate District 10, representing Cascade, Montana, in 2009 and 2011. He served District 15 in 2013 and 2015 due to redistricting.
