= Ed Stafman =

American politician

Member of the Montana House of Representatives
- In office January 4, 2021 – November 1, 2025
- Preceded by: Tom Woods
- Succeeded by: Katie Fire Thunder
- Constituency: 62nd district (2021–2025); 59th district (2025)

Personal details
- Born: Edward Stafman; 1954 (age 71–72) Key West, Florida, U.S.
- Party: Democratic
- Children: 2
- Education: Stony Brook University (BA); Florida State University (MA, JD)
- Profession: Attorney

Edward "Ed" Stafman (born 1954) is an American politician, rabbi, and former attorney who served as a member of the Montana House of Representatives from the 59th district. Elected in November 2020, he assumed office on January 4, 2021.

== Early life and education ==
Stafman was born in Key West, Florida. He earned a Bachelor of Arts degree from Stony Brook University, a Master of Arts from Florida State University, and a Juris Doctor from the Florida State University College of Law.

== Career ==
Prior to entering politics, Stafman worked as a civil rights attorney in Tallahassee, Florida. During his legal career, Stafman specialized in death penalty cases. In 2000, Stafman was one of several lawyers who worked on Bush v. Gore litigation. Stafman was later ordained as a rabbi and moved to Bozeman, Montana with his wife and two children. He has since been affiliated with T'ruah. Stafman was elected to the Montana House of Representatives in November 2020 and assumed office on January 4, 2021. During his tenure in the House, Stafman has sponsored legislation to abolish the death penalty in Montana. Stafman resigned from the Montana House in November 2025; he intends to focus time with his family and grandchildren.
