= Robert Farris-Olsen =

American politician

Rob Farris-Olsen

Member of the Montana House of Representatives from the 79th district
- In office January 7, 2019 – January 2, 2023
- Preceded by: Jenny Eck
- Succeeded by: Laura Smith

Personal details
- Born: Robert Farris-Olsen Helena, Montana, U.S.
- Education: Whitman College (BA); University of Montana (JD)

Robert "Rob" Farris-Olsen is an American attorney and politician who served as a member of the Montana House of Representatives from the 79th district. Elected in 2018, he remained in office from January 7, 2019, to January 2, 2023.

== Early life and education ==
Farris-Olsen was born and raised in Helena, Montana and graduated from Helena High School. He earned a Bachelor of Arts degree in environmental studies from Whitman College and a Juris Doctor from the Alexander Blewett III School of Law at the University of Montana.

== Career ==
Farris-Olsen completed a clerkship program with Judge Mike Wheat of the Montana Supreme Court. He then entered private practice, and has specialized in consumer protection law. In 2015, he was elected to the Helena City Commission. In 2018, he was elected to the Montana House of Representatives, representing the 79th district.
