= Marta Bertoglio =

American politician and real estate broker

Member of the Montana House of Representatives from the 75th district
- In office January 4, 2021 – June 16, 2025
- Preceded by: Greg DeVries
- Succeeded by: Mark Reinschmidt

Personal details
- Born: 1969 (age 56–57) Deer Lodge, Montana
- Party: Republican
- Spouse: Joe Chapman
- Children: 2
- Education: United States Air Force Academy (BS)

Military service
- Allegiance: United States
- Branch/service: United States Air Force
- Years of service: 1991-2014

Marta Bertoglio is an American politician and real estate broker who served as a member of the Montana House of Representatives from the 75th district. Elected in November 2020, she assumed office on January 4, 2021.

== Early life and education ==
Marta Bertoglio was born in Deer Lodge, Montana, in 1969. She earned a Bachelor of Science in political science and government from the United States Air Force Academy in 1991.

== Career ==
Bertoglio served as a United States Air Force officer for 20 years, including in the Air Force Reserve Command, as a space operations officer. After retiring, she returned to Montana and began working as a real estate agent. Bertoglio defeated incumbent Republican Greg DeVries in the 2020 primary election, and was elected to the Montana House of Representatives in November 2020. She resigned from the chamber in June 2025 after being appointed as director of the Montana Department of Commerce.
