= Barbara Bessette =

American politician

Member of the Montana House of Representatives from the 24th district
- In office January 7, 2019 – January 4, 2021
- Preceded by: Jean Price
- Succeeded by: Steven Galloway

Personal details
- Born: Belt, Montana
- Party: Democratic
- Education: Montana State University – Billings
- Occupation: Substance Abuse Prevention Specialist
- Website: Official legislator site

Barbara Bessette is an American politician who was a member of the Montana House of Representatives in the State of Montana, representing District 24.

== Career ==
Before being elected to the Montana House of Representatives, Barbara Bessette worked as a Substance Abuse Prevention Specialist at Gateway Prevention in Great Falls, Montana. Ms. Bessette also served as the chair of the Cascade County DUI task force, as well as on numerous coalitions that help to fight substance abuse.

In 2018 she ran unopposed in the Democratic Primary for District 24 of the Montana House of Representatives. In the general election she faced Republican Mike McNamara whom she beat with 52.4 percent of the vote.

== See also ==
- List of Native American politicians
- Native American women in politics
