= Tom Welch (politician) =

American politician

Tom Welch is an American politician. He serves as a Republican member of the Montana House of Representatives, where he represents District 72, including Dillon, Montana.
