= Marilyn Marler =

American politician

Member, Montana House of Representatives, 90th District
- Incumbent
- Assumed office January 7, 2019
- Preceded by: Ellie Boldman

Member, Missoula, Montana City Council
- In office 2006–2018

Personal details
- Party: Democratic
- Education: University of California, Davis; University of Montana

Marilyn Marler is an American politician. She is a Democrat representing the 90th district in the Montana House of Representatives.

== Political career ==
Marler was a member of the City Council of Missoula, Montana from 2006 to 2018.

In 2018, Ellie Hill, former District 90 representative in the Montana House of Representatives, was unable to run for reelection due to term limits, and Marler ran for the open seat. She defeated Republican Nick Knowles with 67.8% of the vote.

As of July 2020, Marler sits on the following committees:

- Natural Resources
- Taxation
- Local Government
- Legislative Administration

=== Electoral record ===
2018 general election: Montana House of Representatives, District 90
Party	Candidate	Votes	%
Democratic	Marilyn Marler	3,575	67.8%
Republican	Nick Knowles	1,694	32.2%

== Personal life ==
Marler holds a Bachelor's degree from University of California, Davis and a Master's degree from the University of Montana, both in Biology. She has been a Natural Areas Specialist at the University of Montana since 1998.
