= Connie Keogh =

American politician

Member of the Montana House of Representatives from the 91st district
- Incumbent
- Assumed office January 7, 2019
- Preceded by: David Moore

Personal details
- Born: Roscoe, Montana, U.S.
- Party: Democratic
- Children: 2
- Education: Western Governors University (MEd)

Connie Keogh is an American politician and educator serving as a member of the Montana House of Representatives from the 91st district. Elected in November 2018, she assumed office on January 7, 2019.

== Early life and education ==
Keogh was born in Roscoe, Montana. She earned a Bachelor of Science degree in education from the Montana University System and a Master of Education from Western Governors University.

== Career ==
Keogh has worked as a science teacher. After earning her master's degree, she worked as a student mentor and program director at WGU. She was elected to the Montana House of Representatives in November 2018 and assumed office on January 7, 2019.
