= Denley Loge =

American politician from Montana

Member of the Montana House of Representatives from the 14th district
- Incumbent
- Assumed office January 2, 2017
- Preceded by: Nick Schwaderer

Personal details
- Born: 1950 (age 75–76) Valley City, North Dakota, U.S.
- Party: Republican
- Education: University of Montana (BA)

Denley Loge is an American politician in the Montana Senate. He served as a Republican member of the Montana House of Representatives, where he represents District 14, including St. Regis, Montana.

He attended the University of Montana and practices Lutheranism.

Loge was a part of a moderate coalition of 9 Republicans formed with Democrats in the 69th Montana Legislature, dubbed the "nasty nine" by opponents and was censured on March 27 for his efforts.
