= 2020 United States attorney general elections =

- November 3, 2020

10 attorney general offices 10 states (Note: Seat tallies and popular vote do not include states that do not elect attorneys general or territorial attorneys general.)
	Majority party	Minority party
Party	Republican	Democratic
Seats before	22	21
Seats after	22	21
Seat change	Steady	Steady
Popular vote	13,870,574	13,082,140
Percentage	50.66%	47.78%
Seats up	5	5
Seats won	5	5
- Democratic hold Republican hold No election

The 2020 United States attorney general elections were held on November 3, 2020, in 10 states. The previous attorney general elections for this group of states took place in 2016, except in Vermont where attorneys general only serve two-year terms and elected their current attorney general in 2018. Nine state attorneys general ran for reelection and eight won, while Republican Tim Fox of Montana could not run again due to term limits and Republican Curtis Hill of Indiana was eliminated in the Republican convention.

The elections took place concurrently with the 2020 presidential election, elections to the House of Representatives and Senate, and numerous state and local elections.

No attorneys general offices changed party control in 2020.

== Election predictions ==
Several sites and individuals published predictions of competitive seats. These predictions looked at factors such as the strength of the incumbent (if the incumbent is running for re-election), the strength of the candidates, and the partisan leanings of the state (reflected in part by the state's Cook Partisan Voting Index rating). The predictions assigned ratings to each seat, with the rating indicating the predicted advantage that a party has in winning that seat.

Most election predictors use:

- "tossup": no advantage
- "tilt" (used by some predictors): advantage that is not quite as strong as "lean"
- "lean": slight advantage
- "likely": significant, but surmountable, advantage
- "safe": near-certain chance of victory

State	PVI	Incumbent	Last race	Cook June 12, 2020	Result
Indiana	R+9	Curtis Hill (lost re-nomination)	61.9% R	Tossup	Rokita (58.3%)
Missouri	R+9	Eric Schmitt	58.5% R	Safe R	Schmitt (59.5%)
Montana	R+11	Tim Fox (term-limited)	67.7% R	Tossup	Knudsen (58.5%)
North Carolina	R+3	Josh Stein	50.3% D	Lean D	Stein (50.1%)
Oregon	D+5	Ellen Rosenblum	55.2% D	Solid D	Rosenblum (56.0%)
Pennsylvania	EVEN	Josh Shapiro	51.4% D	Likely D	Shapiro (50.9%)
Utah	R+20	Sean Reyes	65.4% R	Solid R	Reyes (60.6%)
Vermont	D+15	T. J. Donovan	66.6% D	Solid D	Donovan (63.1%)
Washington	D+7	Bob Ferguson	66.9% D	Solid D	Ferguson (56.4%)
West Virginia	R+19	Patrick Morrisey	51.6% R	Lean R	Morrisey (63.8%)

== Race summary ==
State	Attorney General	Party	First elected	Result	Candidates
Indiana	Curtis Hill	Republican	2016	Incumbent lost renomination. New attorney general elected. Republican hold.	▌ ✓ Todd Rokita (Republican) 58.3%; ▌ Jonathan Weinzapfel (Democratic) 41.7%
Missouri	Eric Schmitt	Republican	2019 (Note: Schmitt took office after his predecessor (Josh Hawley) resigned.)	Incumbent elected to full term.	▌ ✓ Eric Schmitt (Republican) 59.4%; ▌ Richard Finneran (Democratic) 37.9%; ▌ Kevin Babcock (Libertarian) 2.7%
Montana	Tim Fox	Republican	2012	Incumbent term-limited. New attorney general elected. Republican hold.	▌ ✓ Austin Knudsen (Republican) 58.5%; ▌ Raph Graybill (Democratic) 41.5%
North Carolina	Josh Stein	Democratic	2016	Incumbent re-elected.	▌ ✓ Josh Stein (Democratic) 50.1%; ▌ Jim O'Neill (Republican) 49.9%
Oregon	Ellen Rosenblum	Democratic	2012 (Note: Rosenblum took office after her predecessor (John Kroger) resigned. She was subsequently elected in the 2012 Oregon Attorney General election.)	Incumbent re-elected.	▌ ✓ Ellen Rosenblum (Democratic) 56.0%; ▌ Michael Cross (Republican) 41.3%; ▌ Lars Hedbor (Libertarian) 2.3%
Pennsylvania	Josh Shapiro	Democratic	2016	Incumbent re-elected.	▌ ✓ Josh Shapiro (Democratic) 50.8%; ▌ Heather Heidelbaugh (Republican) 46.3%; ▌ Daniel Wassmer (Libertarian) 1.8%; ▌ Richard Weiss (Green) 1.0%
Utah	Sean Reyes	Republican	2012	Incumbent re-elected.	▌ ✓ Sean Reyes (Republican) 60.6%; ▌ Greg Skordas (Democratic) 33.7%; ▌ Rudy Bautista (Libertarian) 5.7%
Vermont	T. J. Donovan	Democratic	2016	Incumbent re-elected.	▌ ✓ T. J. Donovan (Democratic) 67.7%; ▌ H. Brooke Paige (Republican) 27.5%; ▌ Cris Ericson (Progressive) 4.6%
Washington	Bob Ferguson	Democratic	2012	Incumbent re-elected.	▌ ✓ Bob Ferguson (Democratic) 56.4%; ▌ Matt Larkin (Republican) 43.5%
West Virginia	Patrick Morrisey	Republican	2012	Incumbent re-elected.	▌ ✓ Patrick Morrisey (Republican) 63.8%; ▌ Sam Petsonk (Democratic) 36.2%

== Closest races ==
States where the margin of victory was under 1%

1. North Carolina, 0.26%

States where the margin of victory was between 1% and 5%:

1. Pennsylvania, 4.52%

Blue denotes races won by Democrats.

== Indiana ==
2020 Indiana Attorney General election
- November 3, 2020
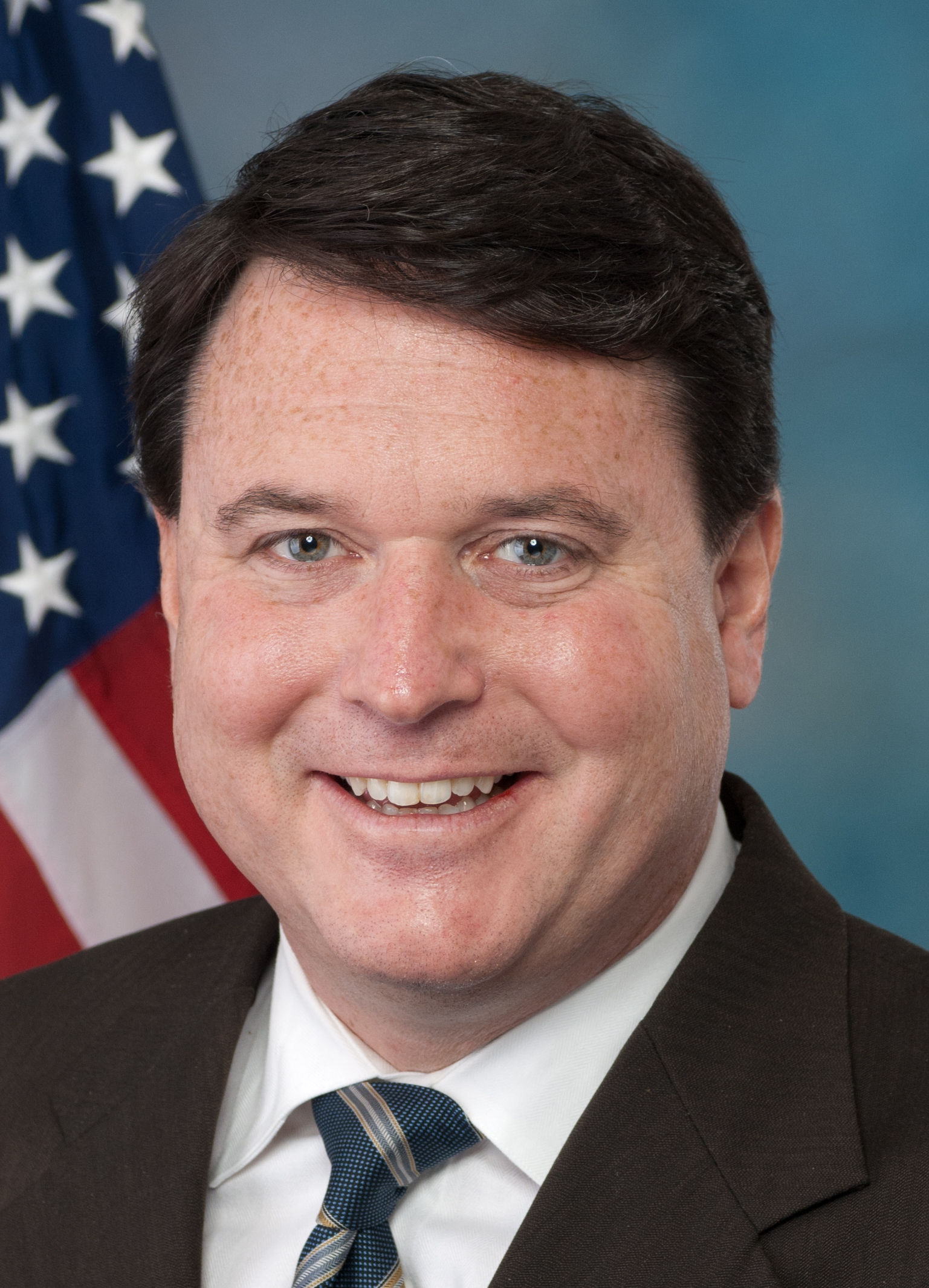

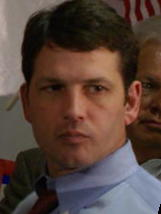
Candidate	Todd Rokita	Jonathan Weinzapfel
Party	Republican	Democratic
Popular vote	1,717,924	1,226,938
Percentage	58.3%	41.7%
- County results Rokita: 50–60% 60–70% 70–80% 80–90% Weinzapfel: 50–60% 60–70%
Attorney General before election
Curtis Hill
Republican
Elected Attorney General
Todd Rokita
Republican

The 2020 Indiana Attorney General election was held on November 3, 2020, to elect the attorney general of the U.S. state of Indiana. The Democratic primary convention was scheduled for June 13, 2020. The Republican primary convention was scheduled with a live stream on June 18, 2020, followed by mail-in voting between June 22 and July 9.

Incumbent Attorney General Curtis Hill ran for re-election, but was defeated at the Republican nominating convention by former U.S. Representative Todd Rokita, who eventually won after three rounds of votes. Jonathan Weinzapfel, former mayor of Evansville, narrowly won the Democratic nomination at the party's nominating convention.

In the general election, Rokita defeated Weinzapfel by approximately 500,000 votes, a margin of more than 16 percentage points. Due to a smaller third-party vote, both Rokita and Weinzapfel received a larger percentage of the vote than their party's candidates in the state's presidential and gubernatorial elections. Rokita carried Tippecanoe County, which voted for Democrat Joe Biden in the presidential race, while Weinzapfel carried his home of Vanderburgh County, which voted for Republicans Donald Trump and Eric Holcomb in the presidential and gubernatorial races.

=== Democratic convention ===
Democratic convention results
Party	Candidate	Votes	%
Democratic	Jonathan Weinzapfel	1,057	51.2%
Democratic	Karen Tallian	1,009	48.8%
Total votes		2,066	100.0%

=== Republican convention ===
Republican convention results
Candidate	Round 1			Round 2			Round 3	
Candidate	Votes	%	Transfer	Votes	%	Transfer	Votes	%
Todd Rokita	479	27.37	+122	601	34.66	+272	873	52.15
Curtis Hill (inc.)	655	37.43	+46	701	40.43	+100	801	47.85
Nate Harter	327	18.69	+105	432	24.91	Eliminated		
John Westercamp	289	16.51	Eliminated					
Active ballots	1,750	100.00		1,734	100.00		1,674	100.00
Exhausted ballots	7	0.40	+16	23	1.31	+60	83	4.72
Total ballots	1,757	100.00		1,757	100.00		1,757	100.00

=== General election ===
2020 Indiana Attorney General election
Party	Candidate	Votes	%	±%
Republican	Todd Rokita	1,722,007	58.34	▼3.97
Democratic	Jonathan Weinzapfel	1,229,644	41.66	▲3.97
Total votes		2,951,651	100.00	
Republican hold				

== Missouri ==
2020 Missouri Attorney General election
- November 3, 2020
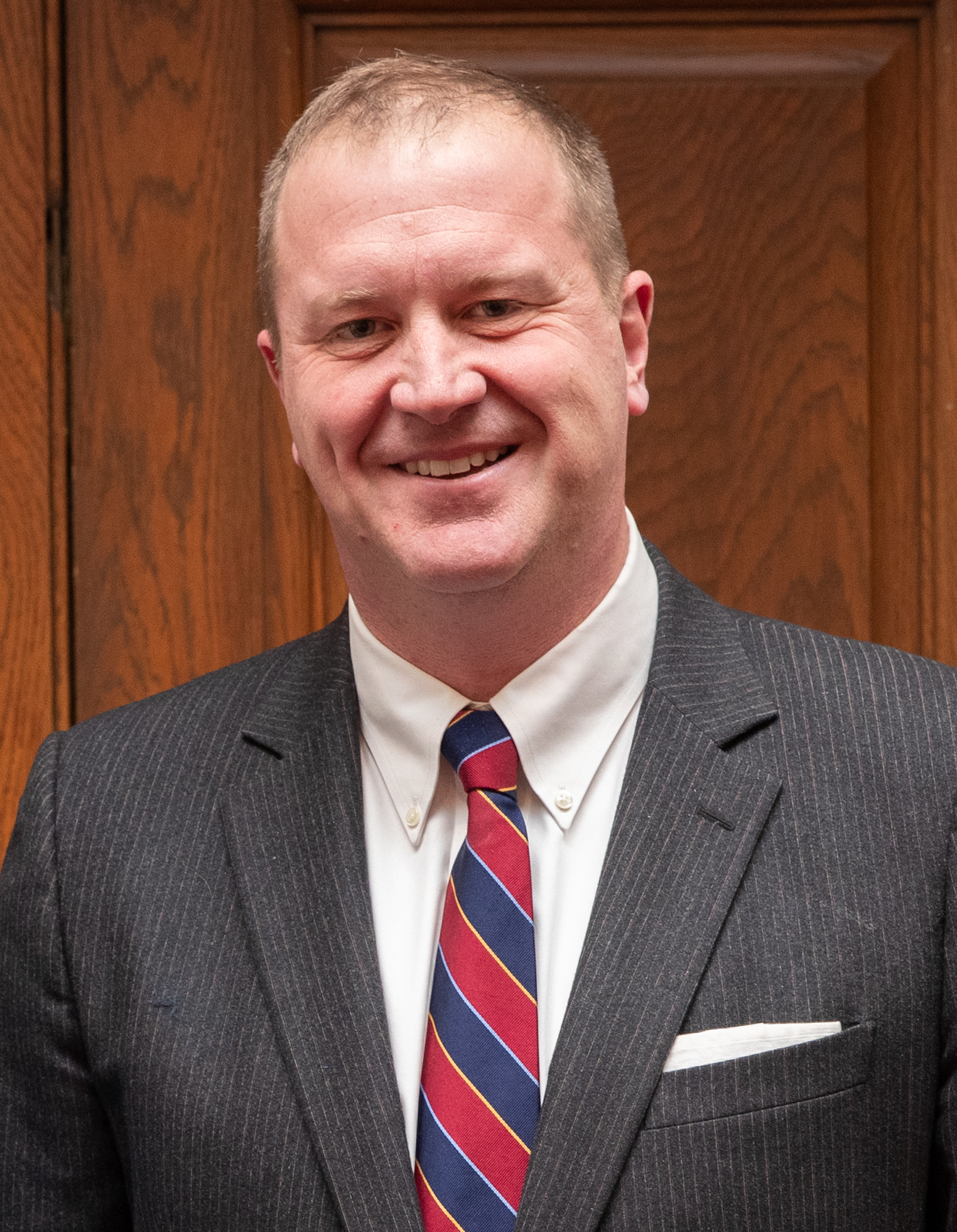

Nominee	Eric Schmitt	Richard Finneran
Party	Republican	Democratic
Popular vote	1,745,353	1,108,944
Percentage	59.46%	37.78%
- County results Schmitt: 50–60% 60–70% 70–80% 80–90% Finneran: 50–60% 70–80%
Attorney General before election
Eric Schmitt
Republican
Elected Attorney General
Eric Schmitt
Republican

The 2020 Missouri Attorney General election was held on November 3, 2020, to elect the attorney general of Missouri. It was held concurrently with the 2020 U.S. presidential election, along with elections to the United States Senate and United States House of Representatives, as well as various state and local elections. Incumbent Republican Attorney General Eric Schmitt was elected to a full term, defeating Democrat Rich Finneran. He was appointed by Governor Mike Parson after Josh Hawley was elected to the U.S Senate in 2018.

=== Republican primary ===
Republican primary results
Party	Candidate	Votes	%
Republican	Eric Schmitt (incumbent)	602,577	100.0
Total votes		602,577	100.0

=== Democratic primary ===
Democratic primary results
Party	Candidate	Votes	%
Democratic	Richard Finneran	272,516	55.39%
Democratic	Elad Gross	219,462	44.61%
Total votes		491,978	100.0%

=== General election ===
Missouri Attorney General election, 2020
Party	Candidate	Votes	%	±%
Republican	Eric Schmitt (incumbent)	1,752,792	59.38%	+0.88%
Democratic	Rich Finneran	1,117,713	37.87%	–3.63%
Libertarian	Kevin C. Babock	81,100	2.75%	N/A
Total votes		2,951,605	100.00%	
Republican hold				

== Montana ==
2020 Montana Attorney General election
- November 3, 2020
Nominee	Austin Knudsen	Raph Graybill
Party	Republican	Democratic
Popular vote	348,322	247,025
Percentage	58.5%	41.5%
- County results Knudsen: 50–60% 60–70% 70–80% 80–90% 90-100% Graybill: 50–60% 60–70%
Attorney General before election
Tim Fox
Republican
Elected Attorney General
Austin Knudsen
Republican

The 2020 Montana Attorney General election was held on November 3, 2020, to elect the attorney general of the U.S. state of Montana. Incumbent Republican Montana Attorney General Tim Fox was re-elected in 2016 with 67.7% of the vote. Fox was term-limited and was ineligible to run for re-election. Fox decided to run for the Governor of Montana election, losing the nomination to Greg Gianforte. Republican Austin Knudsen defeated Republican Jon Bennion in the primary and defeated Democrat Raph Graybill in the general election by over 14 points.

=== Republican primary ===
Republican primary results
Party	Candidate	Votes	%
Republican	Austin Knudsen	116,113	59.8%
Republican	Jon Bennion	78,161	40.2%
Total votes		194,274	100.0

=== Democratic primary ===
Democratic primary results
Party	Candidate	Votes	%
Democratic	Raph Graybill	79,772	57.1%
Democratic	Kimberly Dudik	59,963	42.9%
Total votes		139,735	100.0%

=== General election ===
Montana Attorney General election, 2020
Party	Candidate	Votes	%
Republican	Austin Knudsen	348,322	58.51%
Democratic	Raph Graybill	247,025	41.49%
Total votes		595,347	100.00%
Republican hold			

== North Carolina ==
2020 North Carolina Attorney General election
- November 3, 2020
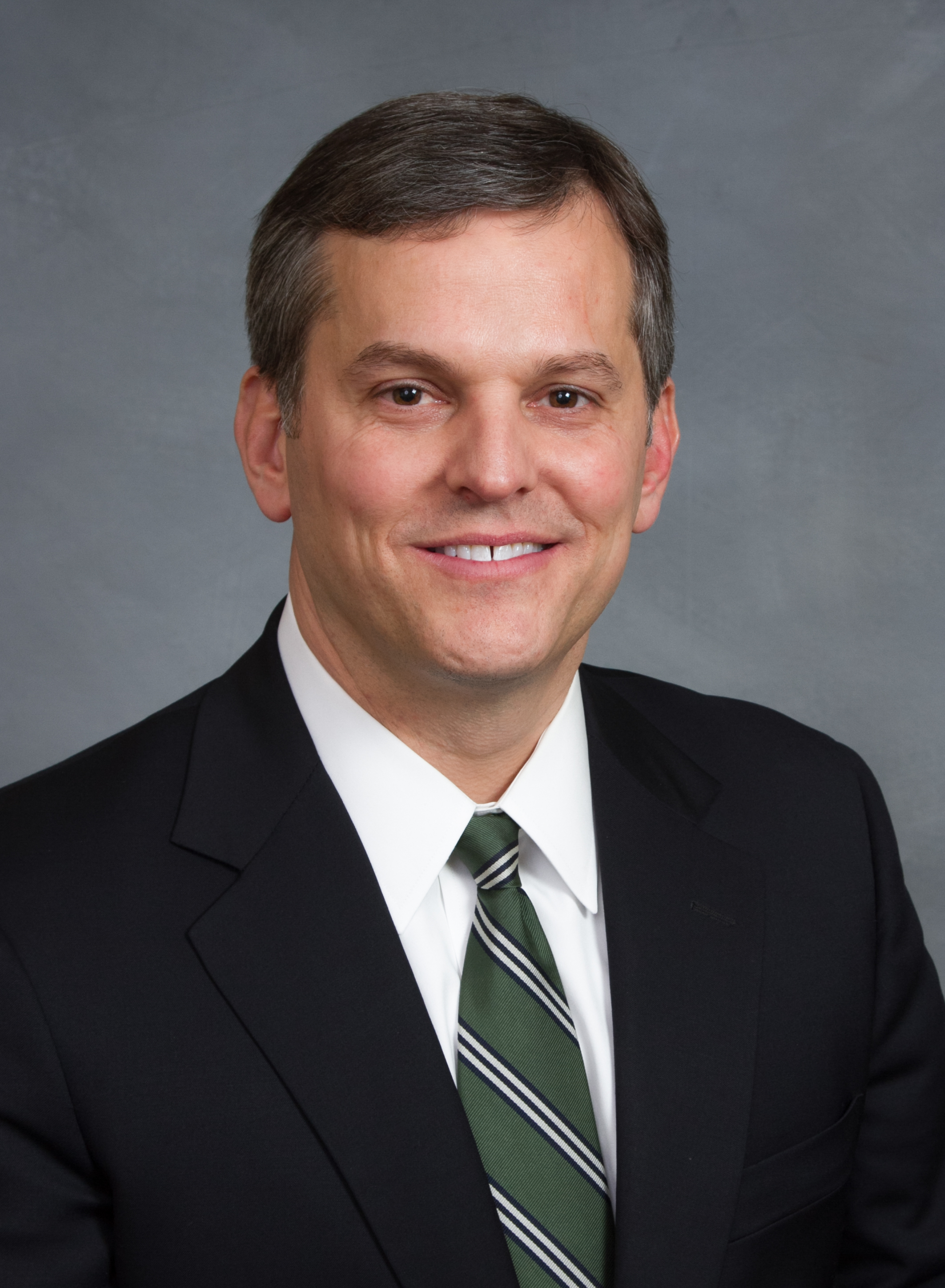

Nominee	Josh Stein	Jim O'Neill
Party	Democratic	Republican
Popular vote	2,713,400	2,699,778
Percentage	50.13%	49.87%
- County results Stein: 50-60% 60-70% 70-80% 80–90% O'Neill: 50-60% 60-70% 70-80%
Attorney General before election
Josh Stein
Democratic
Elected Attorney General
Josh Stein
Democratic

The 2020 North Carolina Attorney General election was held on November 3, 2020, to elect the attorney general of North Carolina, concurrently with the 2020 U.S. presidential election, as well as elections to the United States Senate and elections to the United States House of Representatives and various state and local elections.

Party primary elections were held on March 3, 2020.

Incumbent Democratic Attorney General Josh Stein, first elected in 2016, ran for re-election against Republican Forsyth County District Attorney Jim O'Neill. With a narrow margin separating Stein and O'Neill, the Associated Press was finally able to call Stein the winner on Nov. 17, 2020 (two weeks after Election Day).

=== Republican primary ===
Republican primary results
Party	Candidate	Votes	%
Republican	Jim O'Neill	338,567	46.55%
Republican	Sam Hayes	226,453	31.14%
Republican	Christine Mumma	162,301	22.31%
Total votes		727,321	100.00%

=== Democratic primary ===
This primary was canceled because Attorney General Josh Stein was uncontested.

=== General election ===
North Carolina Attorney General election, 2020
Party	Candidate	Votes	%	±%
Democratic	Josh Stein (incumbent)	2,713,400	50.13%	−0.14%
Republican	Jim O'Neill	2,699,778	49.87%	+0.14%
Total votes		5,413,178	100.00%	N/A
Democratic hold				

== Oregon ==
2020 Oregon Attorney General election
- November 3, 2020
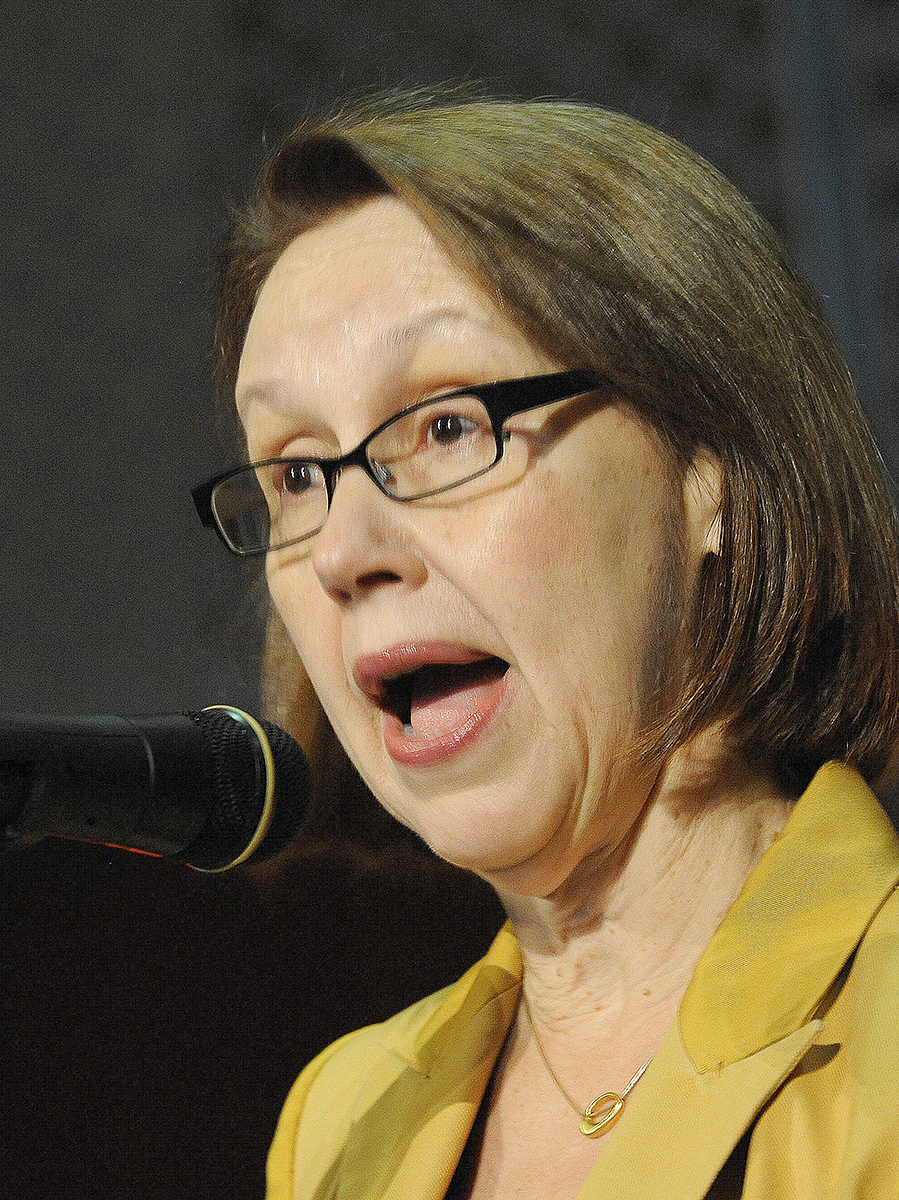

Candidate	Ellen Rosenblum	Michael Cross
Party	Democratic	Republican
Popular vote	1,264,716	934,357
Percentage	56.0%	41.3%
- County results Rosenblum: 40-50% 50–60% 60–70% 70–80% Cross: 50–60% 60–70% 70–80%
Attorney General before election
Ellen Rosenblum
Democratic
Elected Attorney General
Ellen Rosenblum
Democratic

The 2020 Oregon Attorney General election was held on November 3, 2020, to elect the attorney general of Oregon. Incumbent Democratic Attorney General Ellen Rosenblum was originally appointed to the role by former Governor John Kitzhaber on June 29, 2012 to finish the term of her predecessor John Kroger, who resigned from office. She was elected to a full term in 2012 and re-elected in 2016. This office is not subject to term limits, and Rosenblum won a third full term, defeating Republican activist Michael Cross who led an unsuccessful 2019 attempt to recall Governor Kate Brown.

=== Republican primary ===
Republican primary results
Party	Candidate	Votes	%
Republican	Michael Cross	279,909	96.71%
Republican	Write-ins	9,537	3.29%
Total votes		289,446	100.0%

=== Democratic primary ===
Democratic primary results
Party	Candidate	Votes	%
Democratic	Ellen Rosenblum (incumbent)	483,273	99.04%
Democratic	Write-ins	4,661	0.96%
Total votes		487,934	100.0%

=== General election ===
2020 Oregon Attorney General election
Party	Candidate	Votes	%	±%
Democratic	Ellen Rosenblum (incumbent)	1,264,716	55.97%	+0.79%
Republican	Michael Cross	934,357	41.35%	−0.04%
Libertarian	Lars Hedbor	52,087	2.30%	−0.88%
Write-in		8,490	0.38%	+0.08%
Total votes		2,259,650	100.0%	
Democratic hold				

== Pennsylvania ==
2020 Pennsylvania Attorney General election
- November 3, 2020
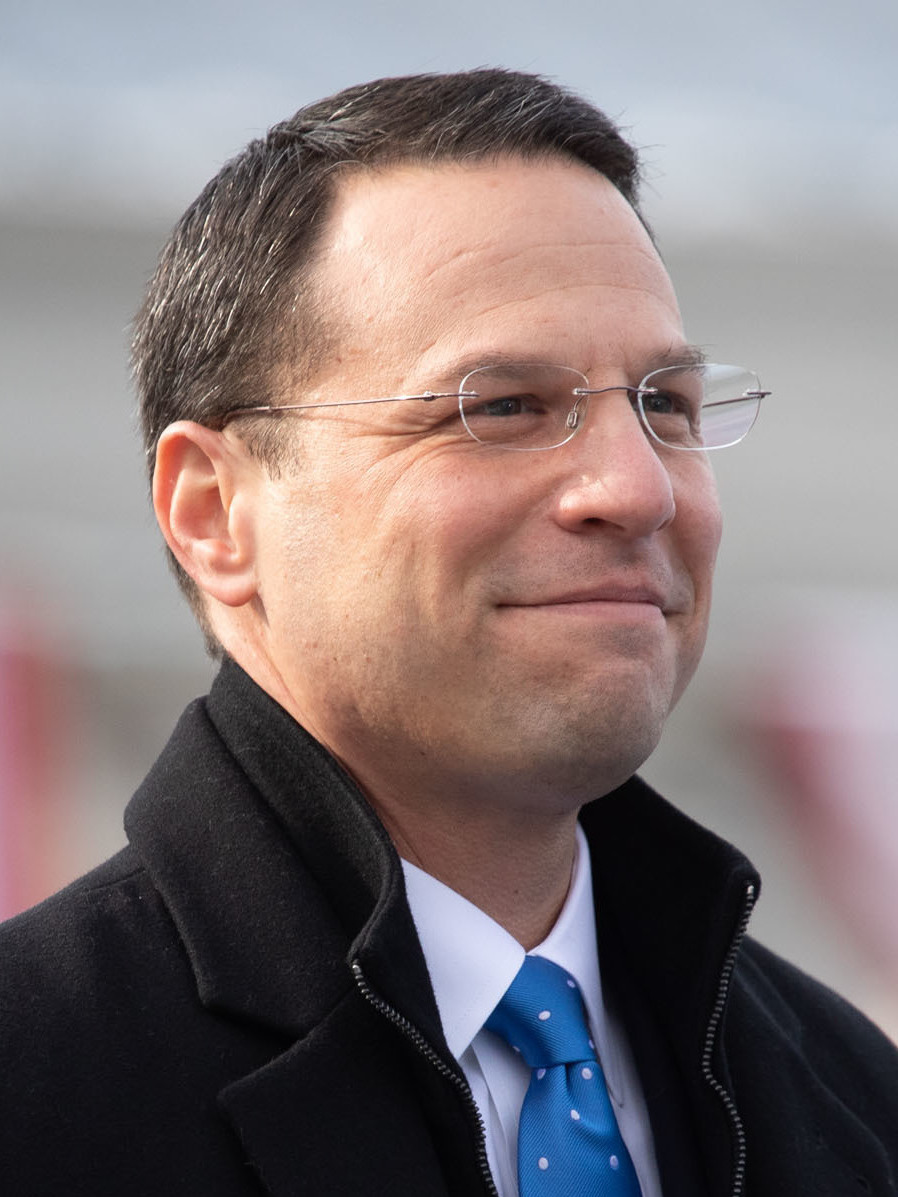

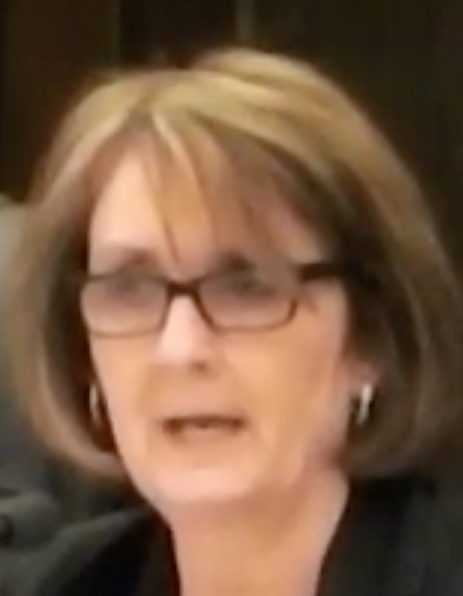
Nominee	Josh Shapiro	Heather Heidelbaugh
Party	Democratic	Republican
Popular vote	3,461,215	3,153,677
Percentage	50.9%	46.3%
- County results Shapiro: 40–50% 50–60% 60–70% 80–90% Heidelbaugh: 50-60% 60-70% 70-80% 80-90%
Attorney General before election
Josh Shapiro
Democratic
Elected Attorney General
Josh Shapiro
Democratic

The 2020 Pennsylvania Attorney General was held on November 3, 2020. Primary elections were originally due to take place on April 28, 2020. However, following concerns regarding the COVID-19 pandemic in the United States including Pennsylvania, the primaries were delayed until June 2, 2020. Incumbent Democratic Attorney General Josh Shapiro defeated Republican Heather Heidelbaugh to win a second term.

=== Republican primary ===
Republican primary results
Party	Candidate	Votes	%
Republican	Heather Heidelbaugh	1,055,168	100.0%
Total votes		1,055,168	100.0%

=== Democratic primary ===
Democratic primary results
Party	Candidate	Votes	%
Democratic	Josh Shapiro (incumbent)	1,429,414	100.0%
Total votes		1,429,414	100.0%

=== General election ===
Pennsylvania Attorney General election, 2020
Party	Candidate	Votes	%	±%
Democratic	Josh Shapiro (incumbent)	3,461,215	50.85%	−0.56%
Republican	Heather Heidelbaugh	3,153,677	46.33%	−2.28%
Libertarian	Daniel Wassmer	120,478	1.77%	N/A
Green	Richard Weiss	71,069	1.04%	N/A
Total votes		6,806,439	100.0%	
Democratic hold				

== Utah ==
2020 Utah Attorney General election
- November 3, 2020
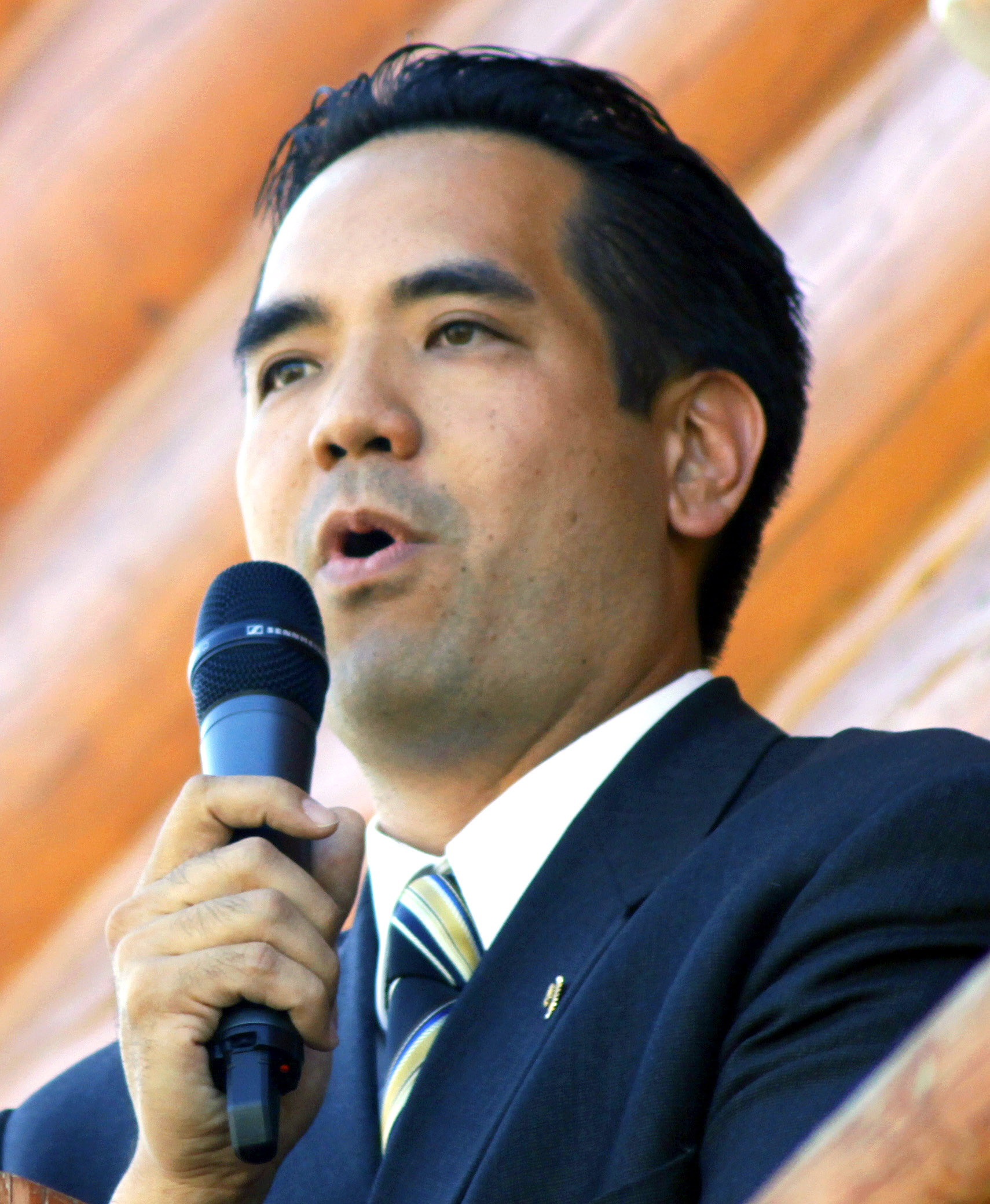
		Dem	LP
Nominee	Sean Reyes	Greg Skordas	Rudy Bautista
Party	Republican	Democratic	Libertarian
Popular vote	878,853	489,499	82,444
Percentage	60.58%	33.74%	5.68%
- County results Reyes: 50-60% 60-70% 70-80% 80-90% Skordas: 40-50% 50-60%
Attorney General before election
Sean Reyes
Republican
Elected Attorney General
Sean Reyes
Republican

The 2020 Utah Attorney General election was held on November 3, 2020 along with several federal and state elections.

Incumbent Attorney General Sean Reyes was re-elected to a third term, defeating Democratic nominee Greg Skordas and Libertarian nominee Rudy Bautista.

=== Republican primary ===
Republican primary results
Party	Candidate	Votes	%
Republican	Sean Reyes (incumbent)	275,212	54.04%
Republican	David O. Leavitt	234,036	45.96%
Total votes		509,248	100%

=== Democratic convention ===
Greg Skordas ran unopposed for the nomination.

=== Libertarian convention ===
Defense attorney Rudy Bautista won the nomination.

=== General election ===
2020 Utah Attorney General election
Party	Candidate	Votes	%
Republican	Sean Reyes (incumbent)	878,853	60.58%
Democratic	Greg Skordas	489,500	33.74%
Libertarian	Rudy Bautista	82,444	5.68%
Total votes		1,450,797	100.00%
Republican hold			

== Vermont ==
2020 Vermont Attorney General election
- November 3, 2020

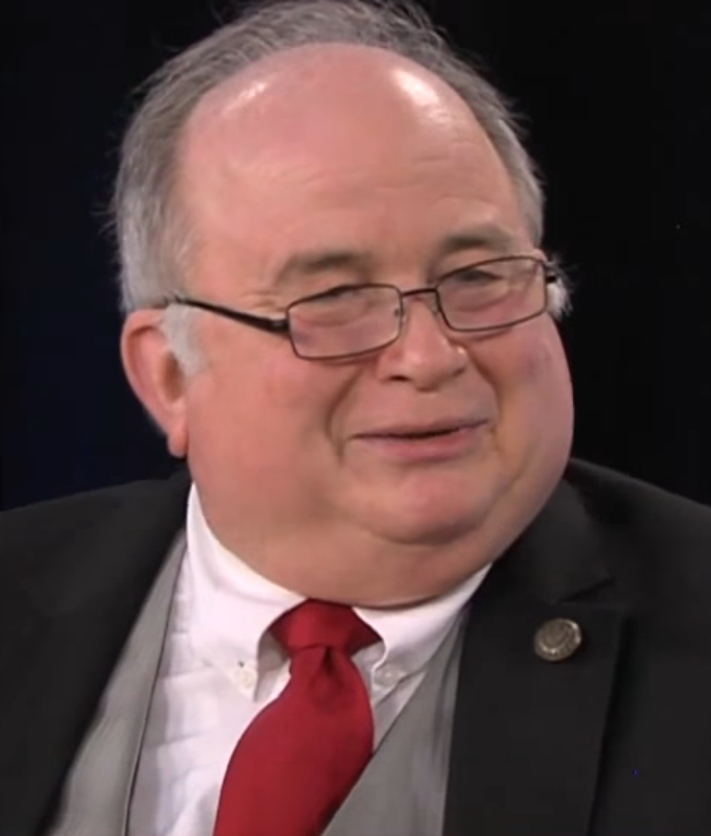
Nominee	T. J. Donovan	H. Brooke Paige
Party	Democratic	Republican
Popular vote	234,081	94,892
Percentage	63.10%	25.58%
- County results Donovan: 40–50% 50–60% 60–70% 70–80%
Attorney General before election
T. J. Donovan
Democratic
Elected Attorney General
T. J. Donovan
Democratic

The 2020 Vermont Attorney General election was held on November 3, 2020 along with several federal and state elections.

Incumbent Democratic Attorney General T. J. Donovan won re-election in a landslide over Republican H. Brooke Paige.

=== Democratic primary ===
Democratic primary results
Party	Candidate	Votes	%
Democratic	T.J. Donovan (incumbent)	94,198	99.1
Democratic	Other	885	0.9
Total votes		95,083	100.0

=== Republican primary ===
Republican primary results
Party	Candidate	Votes	%
Republican	H. Brooke Paige	21,572	49.4%
Republican	Emily Peyton	20,376	46.7%
Republican	Other	1,707	3.9%
Total votes		43,655	100.0%

=== Progressive primary ===
Progressive primary results
Party	Candidate	Votes	%
Progressive	Cris Ericson	409	59.1%
Progressive	Other	283	40.9%
Total votes		692	100.0%

=== General election ===
2020 Vermont Attorney General election
Party	Candidate	Votes	%
Democratic	T.J. Donovan (incumbent)	234,081	63.10%
Republican	H. Brooke Paige	94,892	25.58%
Progressive	Chris Ericson	15,846	4.27%
Total votes		344,819	100.00%
Democratic hold			

== Washington ==
2020 Washington Attorney General election
- November 3, 2020
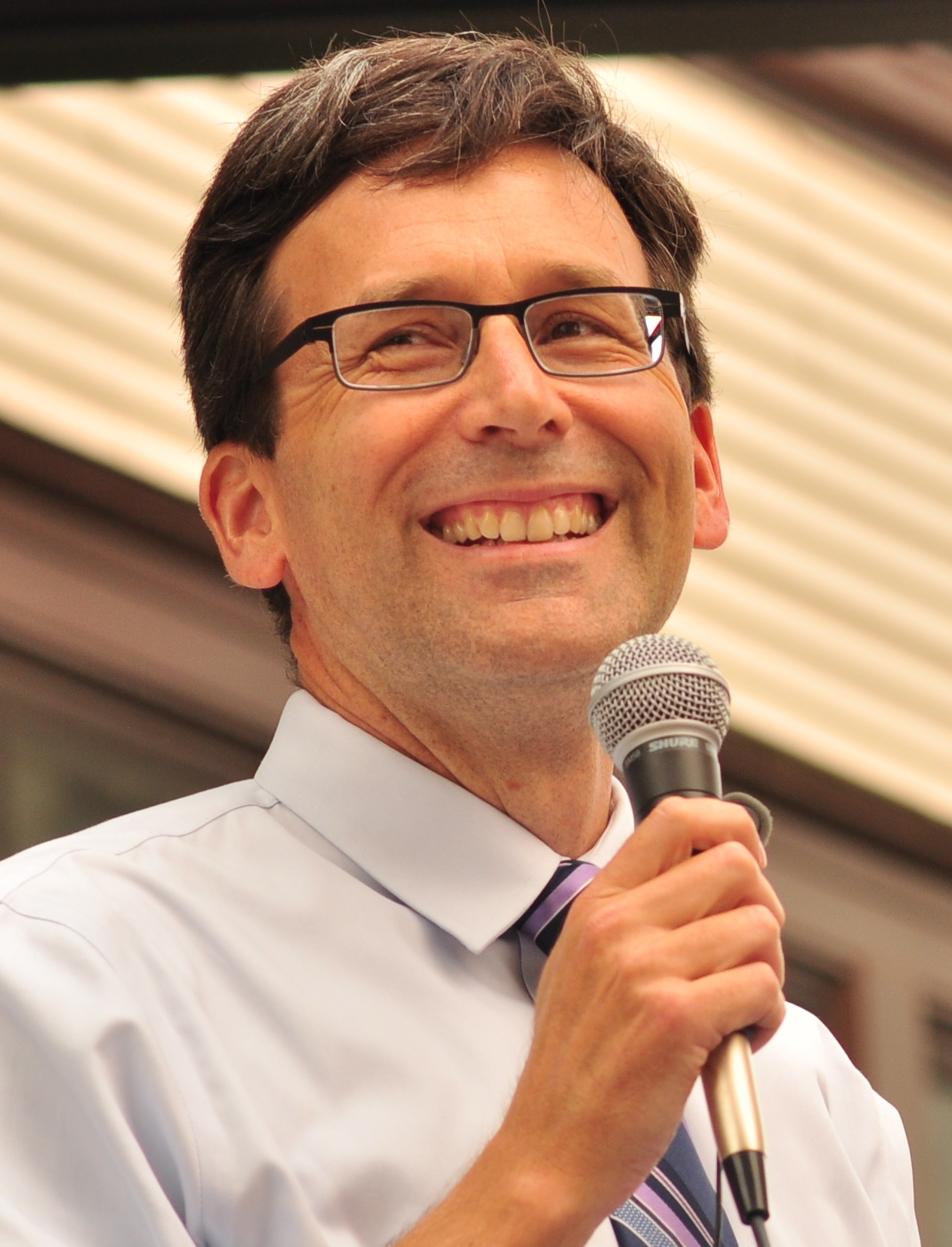

Nominee	Bob Ferguson	Matt Larkin
Party	Democratic	Republican
Popular vote	2,226,418	1,714,927
Percentage	56.43%	43.47%
- County results Ferguson: 50–60% 60–70% 70–80% Larkin: 50–60% 60–70% 70–80%
Attorney General before election
Bob Ferguson
Democratic
Elected Attorney General
Bob Ferguson
Democratic

The 2020 Washington Attorney General election was held on November 3, 2020 along with several federal and state elections.

Incumbent Attorney General Bob Ferguson ran for re-election. He finished first in the open primary, receiving 56% of the vote, and then defeated primary runner-up Republican Matt Larkin in the general election.

=== Results ===
2020 Washington Attorney General election
Primary election
Party	Candidate	Votes	%
Democratic	Bob Ferguson (incumbent)	1,356,225	55.8
Republican	Matt Larkin	575,470	23.7
Republican	Brett Rogers	296,843	12.2
Republican	Mike Vaska	199,826	8.2
Write-in		2,372	0.1
Total votes		2,430,736	100.0
General election
Democratic	Bob Ferguson (incumbent)	2,226,418	56.43
Republican	Matt Larkin	1,714,927	43.47
Write-in		3,968	0.1
Total votes		3,945,313	100
Democratic hold			

== West Virginia ==
2020 West Virginia Attorney General election
- November 3, 2020
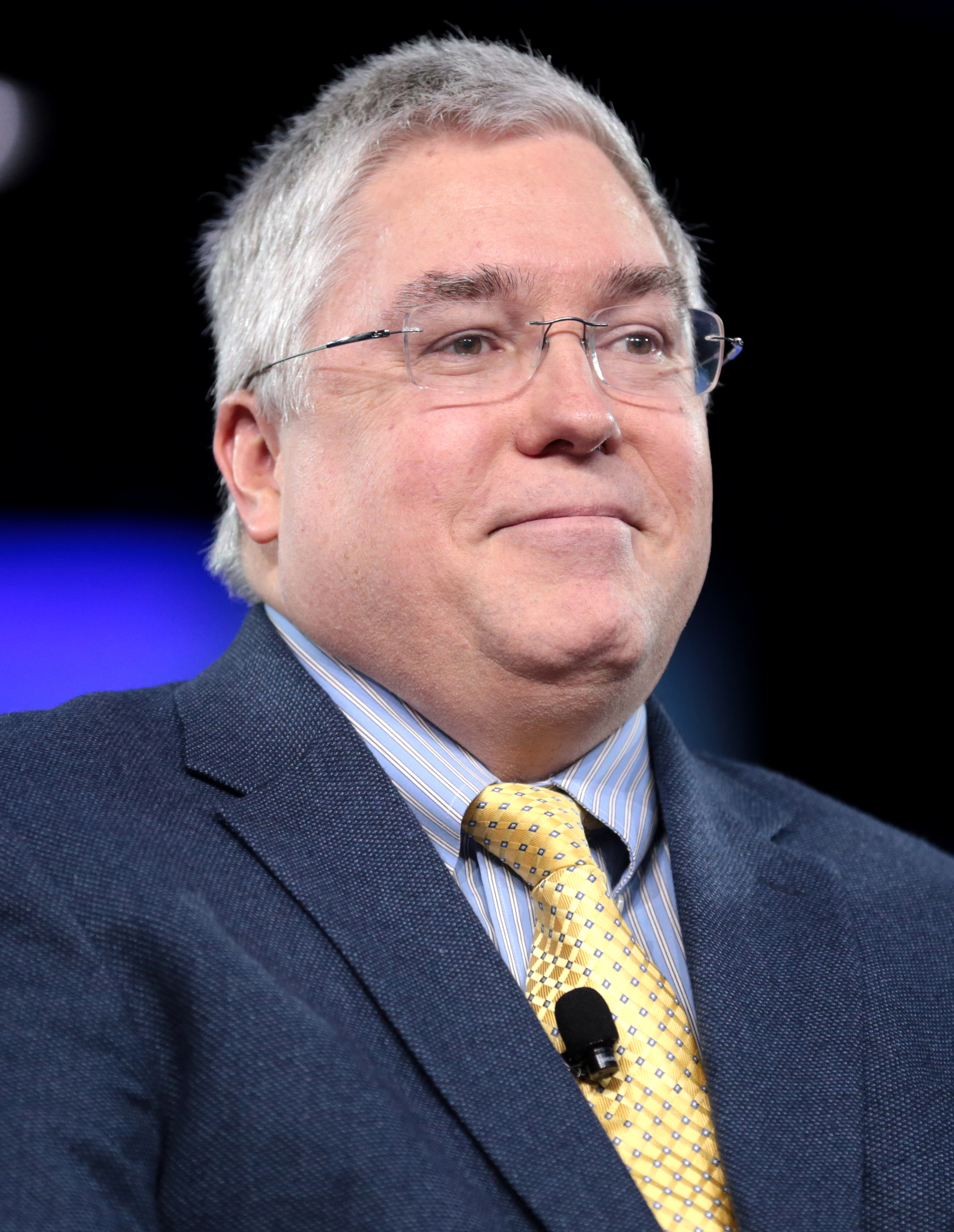

Nominee	Patrick Morrisey	Sam Petsonk
Party	Republican	Democratic
Popular vote	487,250	276,798
Percentage	63.77%	36.23%
- County results Morrisey: 50-60% 60-70% 70-80% 80-90% Petsonk: 50–60%
Attorney General before election
Patrick Morrisey
Republican
Elected Attorney General
Patrick Morrisey
Republican

The 2020 West Virginia Attorney General election was held on November 3, 2020 along with several federal and state elections.

Republican incumbent Patrick Morrisey ran for re-election after being re-elected with 51.6% of the vote in 2016. He was unopposed in the Republican primary and faced Democrat Sam Petsonk on election day. He defeated Petsonk in a landslide.

=== Republican primary ===
Republican primary results
Party	Candidate	Votes	%
Republican	Patrick Morrisey (incumbent)	175,837	100.0%
Total votes		175,837	100.0%

=== Democratic primary ===
Democratic primary results
Party	Candidate	Votes	%
Democratic	Sam Petsonk	86,849	50.04%
Democratic	Isaac Sponaugle	86,704	49.96%
Total votes		173,553	100.0%

=== General election ===
General election results
Party	Candidate	Votes	%
Republican	Patrick Morrisey (incumbent)	487,250	63.77%
Democratic	Sam Petsonk	276,798	36.23%
Total votes		764,048	100.0%

== See also ==
- 2021 Virginia Attorney General election
