= Wenger (surname) =

Wenger is a surname of German origin with a European concentration of the name in Switzerland. It was recorded as early as 1728 in America when an Eva Grabiel was married to a Christian Wenger in Lancaster County, Pennsylvania. Many of its early American bearers were Mennonites. Other - rather seldom - forms of the same name are Wanger and Winger.

Notable people with the surname include:

- Andrew Wenger (born 1990), American soccer player
- Antoine Wenger (1919–2009), French priest, Patristics scholar and journalist
- Arsène Wenger (born 1949), French professional footballer and manager
- Brittany Wenger (born 1994), American winner of the Google Science Fair in 2012
- Don S. Wenger (1911–1986), Major General in the United States Air Force
- Éric Wenger, computer programmer
- Étienne Wenger (born 1952), educational theorist and practitioner from Switzerland
- Fridolin Wenger (died 1931, Swiss footballer
- J. C. Wenger (John Christian Wenger 1910–1995), American Mennonite theologian and professor
- John Wenger (John Weaver Wenger 1778–1851), founder of the Pentecostal Church of the Brethren, popularly known as the Wengerites
- John Wenger (missionary) (1811–1880), Swiss missionary and orientalist
- John Wenger (artist) (1887–1976), Russian-American artist and scenographist, winner of the Rome Prize
- Joseph Wenger (1901–1970), Rear-Admiral of the United States Navy
- Joseph Wenger (bishop) (1868–1956), American Old Order Mennonite preacher
- Jürg Wenger (born 1969), Swiss skeleton racer who competed from 1991 to 2003
- Lauren Wenger (born 1984), American water polo player
- Leopold Wenger (1874–1953), Austrian historian
- Lisa Wenger (1858–1941), Swiss painter
- Livio Wenger (born 1993), Swiss skater
- Louis Wenger (1809–1861), Swiss architect and politician
- Marion A. (Gus) Wenger (1907–1982), American psychologist
- Marta Wenger (born 1953), South African politician
- Michael Wenger (born 1947), American Soto Zen priest
- Mireille Wenger, South African politician
- Nanette Kass Wenger (born 1930), American clinical cardiologist
- Noah W. Wenger (born 1934), Pennsylvania State Senator
- Peter Wenger (1944–2016), Swiss international footballer
- Piers Wenger (born 1972), British television producer
- Susanne Wenger, also known as Adunni Olorisha (c. 1915–2015), Austrian artist
- Ulrich Wenger (born 1944), Swiss cross-country skier
- Walter Wenger, Swiss wrestler
- Helen Gibson, born Rose August Wenger (1892–1977), American film actress and first American stuntwoman

== See also ==
- Wengert
