= Graybill =

Graybill is a surname of German origin of which the earliest known bearers were from Grosshöchstetten in the canton of Bern. The name was recorded as early as 1728 in America when an Eva Grabiel was married to a Christian Wenger in Lancaster County, Pennsylvania. Many of its early bearers were Amish or Mennonites. An old form of the name is Krähenbühl which means "crow's hill". Other forms of the same name include Grabill, Kraybill and Krehbiel, seldom also Krabill, Krebill, Krahenbühl, Crayenbühl and others. Notable people with the surname include:

- Dale L. Graybill, American fraudster
- Jacob W. Graybill (1861–1934), American politician.
- Joseph Graybill (1887–1913), American silent film actor
- Henry Graybill Lamar (1798–1861), United States Representative, lawyer, and jurist from Georgia
- Mike Graybill (born 1966), American football tackle
- Raph Graybill (born 1989), American attorney
- Savannah Graybill (born 1988), American skeleton racer
