= Grabill =

Grabill is a form of the surname Graybill. It may refer to

- Grabill, Indiana, a town in Cedar Creek Township, Allen County, Indiana
- John C. H. Grabill (1849–1903), American photographer
- Peter Grabill (1820–1890), American politician from Maryland
- Ropp-Grabill House, an historic house in the Irving Park neighborhood of Chicago, Illinois
