= Krehbiel =

Krehbiel is a form of the surname Graybill. It may refer to:

- Henry Edward Krehbiel (1854–1923), American musicologist
- Albert Henry Krehbiel (1873–1945), American painter
- Fern Krehbiel (1888–1981), American actress whose stage name was Ruth Maycliffe
- Joey Krehbiel (b. 1992), American baseball player
- John Krehbiel, Jr. (b. 1938), American businessman
