= 2024 Montana Attorney General election =

- November 5, 2024
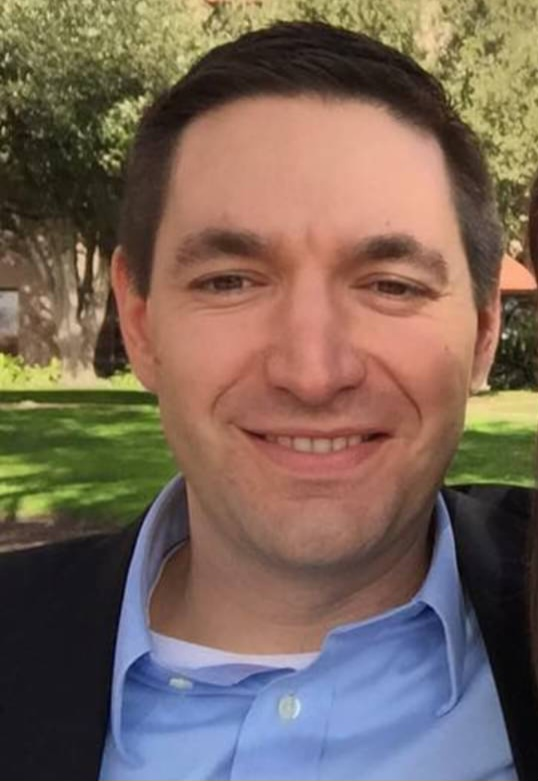

Nominee	Austin Knudsen	Ben Alke
Party	Republican	Democratic
Popular vote	352,682	237,928
Percentage	59.71%	40.29%
- Knudsen: 50–60% 60–70% 70–80% 80–90% >90% Alke: 50–60% 60–70%
Attorney General before election
Austin Knudsen
Republican
Elected Attorney General
Austin Knudsen
Republican

The 2024 Montana Attorney General election was held on November 5, 2024, to elect the attorney general of the state of Montana. It coincided with the concurrent presidential election, as well as various state and local elections, including for U.S. Senate, U.S. House, and governor of Montana. Incumbent attorney general Austin Knudsen was re-elected to a second term, defeating Democratic challenger Ben Alke. Primary elections took place on June 4, 2024.

== Republican primary ==
During a fundraiser on May 11, 2024, Knudsen said that he asked Logan Olson to contest the primary as a dummy candidate, for the purpose of allowing Knudsen's campaign to raise more money in accordance with state campaign finance laws. Olson denied these claims. The director of the Montana Democratic Party lodged an ethics complaint following this disclosure.

=== Candidates ===
==== Nominee ====
- Austin Knudsen, incumbent attorney general

==== Eliminated in primary ====
- Logan Olson, Daniels County Attorney

=== Results ===
Primary results by county: Knudsen: 50–60%; 70–80%; 80–90%; >90%

Republican primary results
Party	Candidate	Votes	%
Republican	Austin Knudsen (incumbent)	148,458	82.20%
Republican	Logan Olson	32,141	17.80%
Total votes		180,599	100.00%

== Democratic primary ==
=== Candidates ===
==== Nominee ====
- Ben Alke, attorney

=== Results ===
Democratic primary results
Party	Candidate	Votes	%
Democratic	Ben Alke	93,295	100.00%
Total votes		93,295	100.00%

== General election ==
=== Predictions ===
Source	Ranking	As of
Sabato's Crystal Ball	Safe R	July 25, 2024

=== Polling ===
Poll source	Date(s) administered	Sample size (Note: Key: A – all adults RV – registered voters LV – likely voters V – unclear)	Margin of error	Austin Knudsen (R)	Ben Alke (D)	Other	Undecided
Public Opinion Strategies (R) (Note: Poll sponsored by the Montana Republican Party)	September 29 - October 1, 2024	500 (LV)	± 4.34%	53%	35%	2% (Note: "Won't Vote" with 1%; "Refused" with 1%)	11%
Public Opinion Strategies (R)	June 11–13, 2024	500 (LV)	± 4.4%	55%	33%	–	12%

=== Results ===
2024 Montana Attorney General election
Party	Candidate	Votes	%	±%
Republican	Austin Knudsen (incumbent)	352,682	59.71%	+1.20
Democratic	Ben Alke	237,928	40.29%	–1.20
Total votes		590,610	100.00%	N/A
Republican hold				

==== By county ====
County	Austin Knudsen Republican		Ben Alke Democratic		Margin		Total
County	Votes	%	Votes	%	Votes	%	Total
Beaverhead	4,172	73.62%	1,495	26.38%	2,677	47.24%	5,667
Big Horn	2,136	48.42%	2,275	51.58%	-139	-3.15%	4,411
Blaine	1,523	50.68%	1,482	49.32%	41	1.36%	3,005
Broadwater	3,716	78.68%	1,007	21.32%	2,709	57.36%	4,723
Carbon	4,817	66.40%	2,438	33.60%	2,379	32.79%	7,255
Carter	768	92.20%	65	7.80%	703	84.39%	833
Cascade	22,896	62.11%	13,968	37.89%	8,928	24.22%	36,864
Chouteau	1,933	67.61%	926	32.39%	1,007	35.22%	2,859
Custer	4,219	74.19%	1,468	25.81%	2,751	48.37%	5,687
Daniels	744	80.09%	185	19.91%	559	60.17%	929
Dawson	3,573	78.53%	977	21.47%	2,596	57.05%	4,550
Deer Lodge	2,298	48.02%	2,488	51.98%	-190	-3.97%	4,786
Fallon	1,286	88.75%	163	11.25%	1,123	77.50%	1,449
Fergus	5,007	75.71%	1,606	24.29%	3,401	51.43%	6,613
Flathead	41,345	66.84%	20,516	33.16%	20,829	33.67%	61,861
Gallatin	32,820	48.42%	34,964	51.58%	-2,144	-3.16%	67,784
Garfield	737	94.73%	41	5.27%	696	89.46%	778
Glacier	1,871	37.23%	3,154	62.77%	-1,283	-25.53%	5,025
Golden Valley	441	86.47%	69	13.53%	372	72.94%	510
Granite	1,525	71.60%	605	28.40%	920	43.19%	2,130
Hill	3,923	58.98%	2,728	41.02%	1,195	17.97%	6,651
Jefferson	5,355	65.40%	2,833	34.60%	2,522	30.80%	8,188
Judith Basin	1,088	81.19%	252	18.81%	836	62.39%	1,340
Lake	10,029	60.41%	6,572	39.59%	3,457	20.82%	16,601
Lewis and Clark	20,561	49.63%	20,871	50.37%	-310	-0.75%	41,432
Liberty	761	78.53%	208	21.47%	553	57.07%	969
Lincoln	8,893	77.04%	2,651	22.96%	6,242	54.07%	11,544
Madison	4,624	73.26%	1,688	26.74%	2,936	46.51%	6,312
McCone	930	87.57%	132	12.43%	798	75.14%	1,062
Meagher	876	76.31%	272	23.69%	604	52.61%	1,148
Mineral	2,065	74.95%	690	25.05%	1,375	49.91%	2,755
Missoula	27,939	39.25%	43,251	60.75%	-15,312	-21.51%	71,190
Musselshell	2,581	86.70%	396	13.30%	2,185	73.40%	2,977
Park	6,148	53.30%	5,386	46.70%	762	6.61%	11,534
Petroleum	282	87.04%	42	12.96%	240	74.07%	324
Phillips	1,806	83.26%	363	16.74%	1,443	66.53%	2,169
Pondera	1,973	71.05%	804	28.95%	1,169	42.10%	2,777
Powder River	938	86.45%	147	13.55%	791	72.90%	1,085
Powell	2,465	76.65%	751	23.35%	1,714	53.30%	3,216
Prairie	551	82.24%	119	17.76%	432	64.48%	670
Ravalli	20,657	70.82%	8,511	29.18%	12,146	41.64%	29,168
Richland	4,313	83.98%	823	16.02%	3,490	67.95%	5,136
Roosevelt	1,933	50.34%	1,907	49.66%	26	0.68%	3,840
Rosebud	2,442	67.18%	1,193	32.82%	1,249	34.36%	3,635
Sanders	6,181	78.21%	1,722	21.79%	4,459	56.42%	7,903
Sheridan	1,245	67.85%	590	32.15%	655	35.69%	1,835
Silver Bow	7,992	45.18%	9,698	54.82%	-1,706	-9.64%	17,690
Stillwater	4,709	80.62%	1,132	19.38%	3,577	61.24%	5,841
Sweet Grass	1,809	77.01%	540	22.99%	1,269	54.02%	2,349
Teton	2,563	73.44%	927	26.56%	1,636	46.88%	3,490
Toole	1,592	79.36%	414	20.64%	1,178	58.72%	2,006
Treasure	365	82.77%	76	17.23%	289	65.53%	441
Valley	2,957	73.89%	1,045	26.11%	1,912	47.78%	4,002
Wheatland	854	80.26%	210	19.74%	644	60.53%	1,064
Wibaux	459	85.96%	75	14.04%	384	71.91%	534
Yellowstone	50,996	63.73%	29,017	36.27%	21,979	27.47%	80,013
Totals	352,682	59.71%	237,928	40.29%	114,754	19.43%	590,610

==== Counties that flipped from Democratic to Republican ====
- Blaine (largest city: Chinook)

==== Counties that flipped from Republican to Democratic ====
- Lewis and Clark (largest city: Helena)

==== By congressional district ====
Knudsen won both congressional districts.

District	Knudsen	Alke	Representative
1st	56%	44%	Ryan Zinke
2nd	64%	36%	Matt Rosendale (118th Congress)
2nd	64%	36%	Troy Downing (119th Congress)

== Notes ==
Partisan clients
