= John Krehbiel =

John Krehbiel may refer to:

- John Krehbiel Jr., American chief executive and billionaire
- V. John Krehbiel, American ambassador
