= Julie French =

American politician

Member of the Montana House of Representatives from the 36th district
- In office January 1, 2007 – January 3, 2011
- Succeeded by: Austin Knudsen

Personal details
- Party: Democratic
- Occupation: Restorative care aide

Julie E. French served as a Democratic Party member of the Montana House of Representatives, representing District 36 from 2007 to 2011.
