= Culbertson, Montana =

- Town
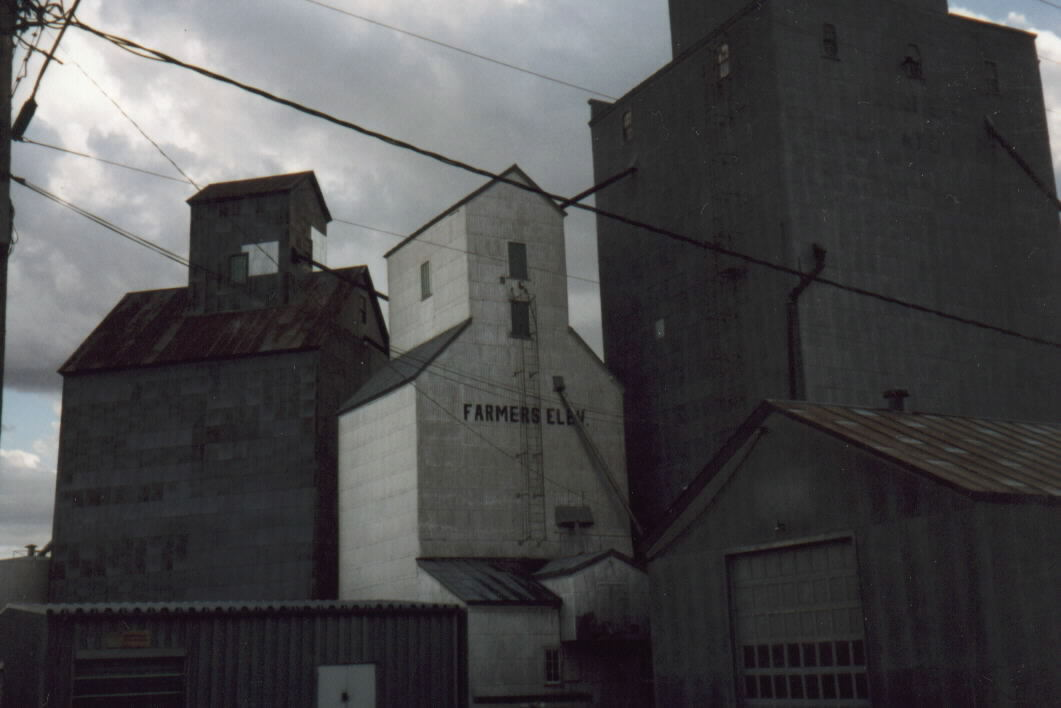
- Grain elevators

- Location of Culbertson, Montana
- Coordinates: 48°08′48″N 104°30′32″W
- Country: United States
- State: Montana
- County: Roosevelt

Area
  - Total: 1.02 sq mi (2.65 km^{2})
  - Land: 1.02 sq mi (2.65 km^{2})
  - Water: 0 sq mi (0.00 km^{2})
- Elevation: 1,933 ft (589 m)

Population (2020)
  - Total: 753
  - Density: 735.1/sq mi (283.84/km^{2})
- Time zone: UTC-7 (Mountain (MST))
  - Summer (DST): UTC-6 (MDT)
- ZIP code: 59218
- Area code: 406
- FIPS code: 30-18475
- GNIS feature ID: 2412395
- Website: culbertsonmt.com

Culbertson is a town in Roosevelt County, Montana, United States. The population was 753 at the 2020 census.

== History ==
Culbertson was created in June 1887 following the arrival of the Great Northern Railway, then known as the St. Paul, Minneapolis & Manitoba Railway. The town was named after Major Alexander Culbertson, former head of the American Fur Company's Fort Union, 23 miles (37 km) to the east.

The settlement of Culbertson followed hard on the heels of the 1886-87 watershed years for the early cattle industry. As a result, the first settlers in the area raised horses for the US Cavalry’s various Montana and Dakota posts. As cattle prices slowly rebounded, the range was once again stocked with cattle, though the second wave of cattlemen utilized hardy English breeds instead of the Texas longhorns of the earlier outfits.

With the passage of new homestead laws in 1909 enabling homesteaders to take out larger acreages, the area saw an influx of dryland farmers. With its railroad connection, Culbertson became the center of the area’s agricultural trade. When the agricultural boom went bust after World War II and never resumed its former glory, Culbertson saw a gradual decline in businesses and population. This was somewhat ameliorated by a heavy railroad presence in the community.

Culbertson also became a surviving center as smaller adjacent communities dried up in the agricultural depression of the 1920s and 1930s. With better automobiles and better roads, farmers and ranchers could live farther from centers of trade.

== Geography ==
According to the United States Census Bureau, the town has a total area of 0.60 square miles (1.55 km^{2}), all land.

=== Climate ===
According to the Köppen Climate Classification system, Culbertson has a semi-arid climate, abbreviated "BSk" on climate maps.

Climate data for Culbertson, Montana (1991–2020 normals, extremes 1900–1914, 1923–present)
Month	Jan	Feb	Mar	Apr	May	Jun	Jul	Aug	Sep	Oct	Nov	Dec	Year
Record high °F (°C)	61 (16)	69 (21)	81 (27)	94 (34)	103 (39)	109 (43)	113 (45)	109 (43)	105 (41)	96 (36)	80 (27)	66 (19)	113 (45)
Mean maximum °F (°C)	46.6 (8.1)	49.6 (9.8)	67.2 (19.6)	79.9 (26.6)	87.5 (30.8)	93.3 (34.1)	98.0 (36.7)	98.5 (36.9)	94.3 (34.6)	81.5 (27.5)	63.9 (17.7)	48.0 (8.9)	100.4 (38.0)
Mean daily maximum °F (°C)	24.4 (−4.2)	29.8 (−1.2)	43.5 (6.4)	59.4 (15.2)	70.7 (21.5)	79.0 (26.1)	86.5 (30.3)	86.5 (30.3)	75.7 (24.3)	58.9 (14.9)	40.5 (4.7)	27.9 (−2.3)	56.9 (13.8)
Daily mean °F (°C)	13.3 (−10.4)	18.3 (−7.6)	31.0 (−0.6)	44.7 (7.1)	55.5 (13.1)	64.6 (18.1)	71.1 (21.7)	70.0 (21.1)	59.6 (15.3)	45.0 (7.2)	29.0 (−1.7)	17.2 (−8.2)	43.3 (6.3)
Mean daily minimum °F (°C)	2.1 (−16.6)	6.9 (−13.9)	18.4 (−7.6)	29.9 (−1.2)	40.4 (4.7)	50.2 (10.1)	55.7 (13.2)	53.5 (11.9)	43.5 (6.4)	31.1 (−0.5)	17.5 (−8.1)	6.5 (−14.2)	29.6 (−1.3)
Mean minimum °F (°C)	−26.9 (−32.7)	−20.4 (−29.1)	−8.3 (−22.4)	12.6 (−10.8)	23.5 (−4.7)	36.5 (2.5)	43.7 (6.5)	39.1 (3.9)	26.5 (−3.1)	11.6 (−11.3)	−6.4 (−21.3)	−20.5 (−29.2)	−31.7 (−35.4)
Record low °F (°C)	−50 (−46)	−57 (−49)	−34 (−37)	−12 (−24)	11 (−12)	26 (−3)	33 (1)	25 (−4)	11 (−12)	−8 (−22)	−31 (−35)	−48 (−44)	−57 (−49)
Average precipitation inches (mm)	0.36 (9.1)	0.31 (7.9)	0.49 (12)	0.94 (24)	2.25 (57)	2.88 (73)	2.73 (69)	1.40 (36)	1.33 (34)	0.91 (23)	0.49 (12)	0.43 (11)	14.52 (369)
Average precipitation days (≥ 0.01 in)	4.4	3.5	4.5	5.2	8.8	11.3	8.8	6.4	6.2	5.4	4.5	4.6	73.6
Source: NOAA

== Demographics ==
Historical population
Census	Pop.	Note	%±
1910	528		—
1920	547		3.6%
1930	536		−2.0%
1940	585		9.1%
1950	779		33.2%
1960	919		18.0%
1970	821		−10.7%
1980	887		8.0%
1990	796		−10.3%
2000	716		−10.1%
2010	714		−0.3%
2020	753		5.5%
U.S. Decennial Census

=== 2010 census ===
As of the census of 2010, there were 714 people, 296 households, and 191 families residing in the town. The population density was 1,190.0 inhabitants per square mile (459.5/km^{2}). There were 336 housing units at an average density of 560.0 per square mile (216.2/km^{2}). The racial makeup of the town was 88.9% White, 0.3% African American, 6.3% Native American, 0.1% Asian, 1.0% from other races, and 3.4% from two or more races. Hispanic or Latino of any race were 1.7% of the population.

There were 296 households, of which 29.4% had children under the age of 18 living with them, 56.1% were married couples living together, 5.4% had a female householder with no husband present, 3.0% had a male householder with no wife present, and 35.5% were non-families. 30.7% of all households were made up of individuals, and 14.2% had someone living alone who was 65 years of age or older. The average household size was 2.33 and the average family size was 2.93.

The median age in the town was 43 years. 23.2% of residents were under the age of 18; 5.5% were between the ages of 18 and 24; 23.7% were from 25 to 44; 29% were from 45 to 64; and 18.6% were 65 years of age or older. The gender makeup of the town was 51.1% male and 48.9% female.

=== 2000 census ===
As of the census of 2000, there were 716 people, 295 households, and 192 families residing in the town. The population density was 1,213.7 inhabitants per square mile (468.6/km^{2}). There were 356 housing units at an average density of 603.5 per square mile (233.0/km^{2}). The racial makeup of the town was 89.53% White, 0.28% African American, 6.01% Native American, 0.28% Asian, 0.84% from other races, and 3.07% from two or more races. Hispanic or Latino of any race were 0.98% of the population.

There were 295 households, out of which 32.5% had children under the age of 18 living with them, 55.6% were married couples living together, 6.4% had a female householder with no husband present, and 34.6% were non-families. 30.8% of all households were made up of individuals, and 15.6% had someone living alone who was 65 years of age or older. The average household size was 2.32 and the average family size was 2.90.

In the town, the population was spread out, with 23.7% under the age of 18, 5.4% from 18 to 24, 23.7% from 25 to 44, 24.0% from 45 to 64, and 23.0% who were 65 years of age or older. The median age was 43 years. For every 100 females, there were 89.9 males. For every 100 females age 18 and over, there were 90.9 males.

The median income for a household in the town was $30,000, and the median income for a family was $38,750. Males had a median income of $26,771 versus $14,643 for females. The per capita income for the town was $15,393. About 11.2% of families and 11.3% of the population were below the poverty line, including 8.6% of those under age 18 and 14.9% of those age 65 or over.

== Education ==
Culbertson School serves students from kindergarten through 12th grade. Culbertson High School's team name is the Cowboys/Cowgirls.

Roosevelt County Library, headquartered in Wolf Point, has a branch location in Culbertson.

== Media ==
The Community News is a weekly local newspaper. It is a sister paper to the Northern Plains Independent of Wolf Point.

== Infrastructure ==
The Theodore Roosevelt Expressway intersects the town from the north. U.S. Route 2 passes through from east to west.

Big Sky Field Airport is a public use airport located 1 mile northeast of town.

Amtrak’s Empire Builder, which operates between Seattle/Portland and Chicago, passes through the town on BNSF tracks, but makes no stop. The nearest station is located in Williston, 43 miles (69 km) to the east.

== Notable people ==
- Lane Chandler, western film actor; lived here as a child
- Terry Falcon, former NFL player for the New England Patriots and New York Giants; grew up here
- Austin Knudsen, attorney who served as a member and Speaker of the Montana House of Representatives
- Rhonda Knudsen, retired civil engineer and member of the Montana House of Representatives
