= Kraybill =

Kraybill is a form of the surname Graybill. It may refer to:

- Donald Kraybill (born 1945), American scholar who works on Anabaptism, especially the Amish
- Kraybill Conflict Style Inventory, an inventory developed by Ronald S. Kraybill
