= 2024 Montana gubernatorial election =

- November 5, 2024
- Turnout: 76.57%▼4.76
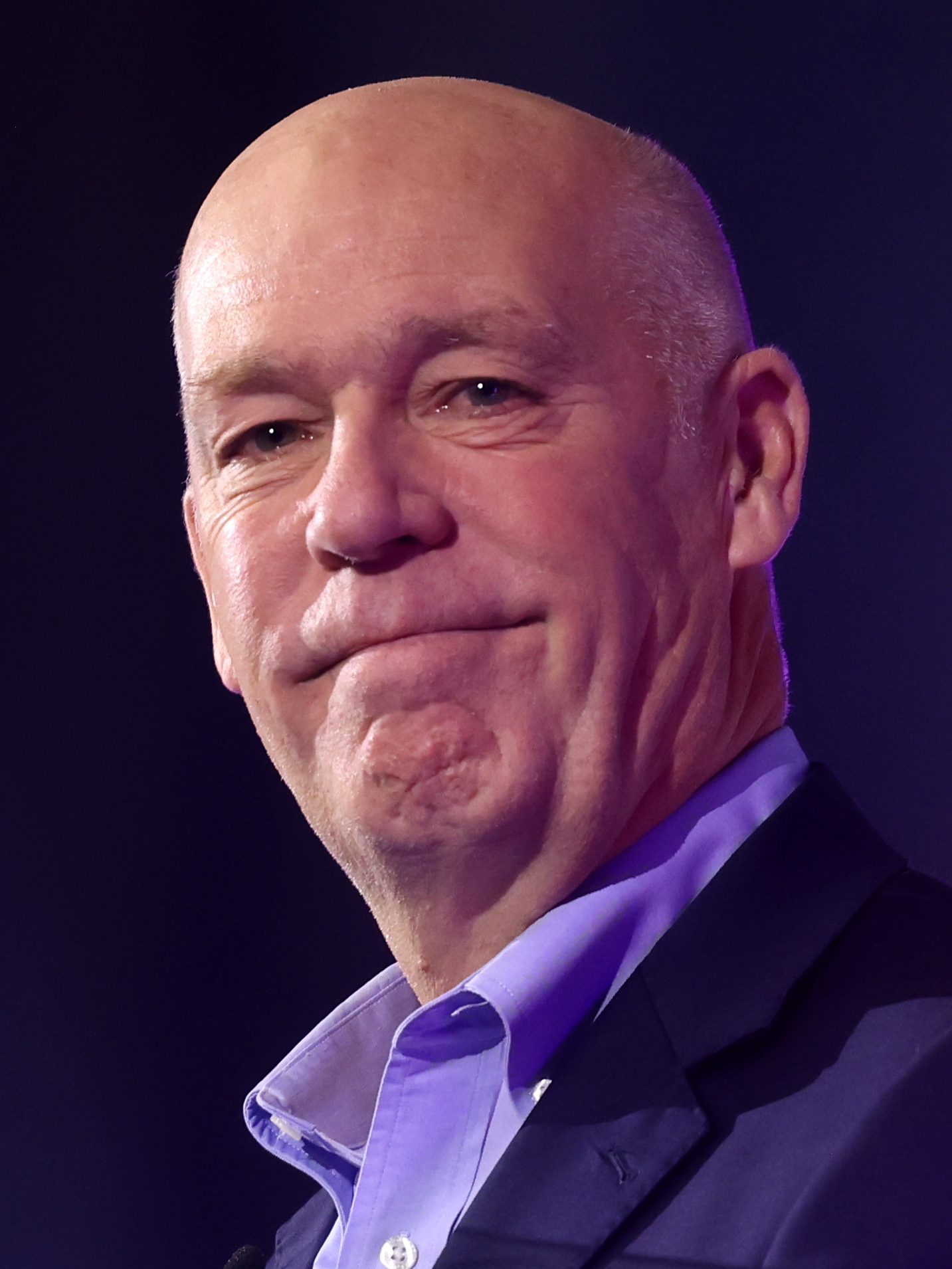

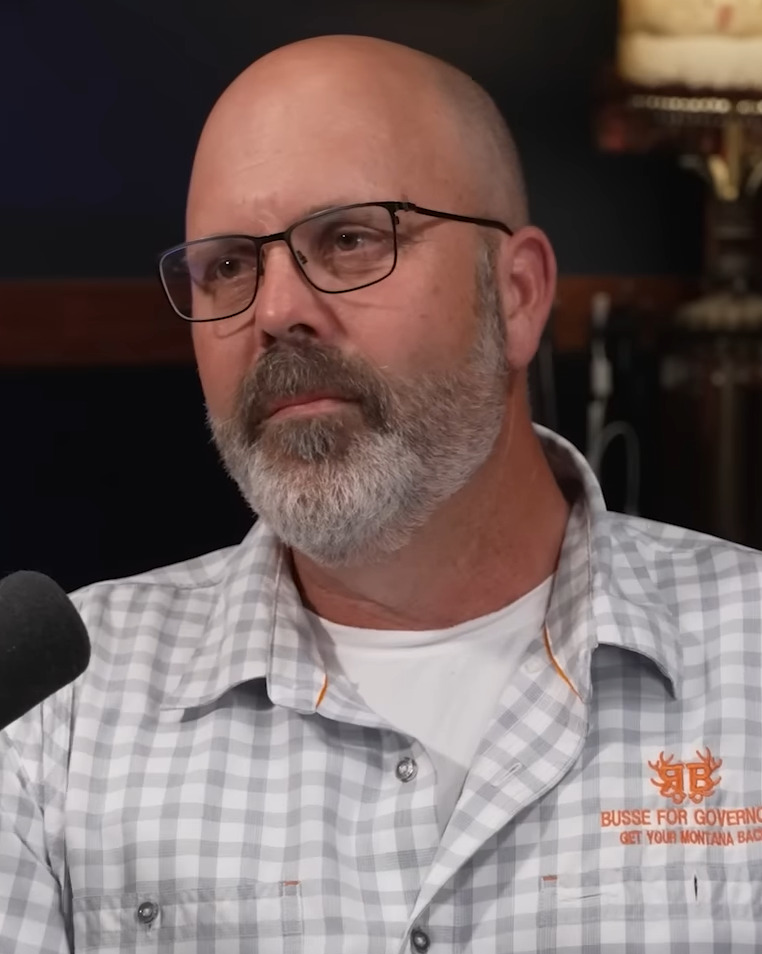
Nominee	Greg Gianforte	Ryan Busse
Party	Republican	Democratic
Running mate	Kristen Juras	Raph Graybill
Popular vote	354,569	232,644
Percentage	58.86%	38.62%
- Gianforte: 40–50% 50–60% 60–70% 70–80% 80–90% >90% Busse: 40–50% 50–60% 60–70% 70–80% 80–90% No votes
Governor before election
Greg Gianforte
Republican
Elected Governor
Greg Gianforte
Republican

The 2024 Montana gubernatorial election was held on November 5, 2024, to elect the governor of the U.S. state of Montana, concurrently with the 2024 U.S. presidential election, as well as elections to the United States Senate, elections to the United States House of Representatives, and various state and local elections. Primary elections took place on June 4, 2024. Incumbent Republican Governor Greg Gianforte won election to a second term, defeating Democratic nominee Ryan Busse. Gianforte won by a 20% margin, which was larger than his 13% margin in 2020.

Though Montana has backed Republicans in every presidential election since 1996, the sparsely populated Mountain state maintained a Democratic tendency at the state and U.S. Senate levels well through the 2010s. This was the first gubernatorial election since 1996 that a Republican was re-elected governor of Montana. This was also the largest margin of victory in a gubernatorial election since Brian Schweitzer's 33-point re-election victory in 2008, and the largest for a Republican since Mark Racicot's aforementioned 58-point landslide re-election in 1996.

== Republican primary ==
=== Candidates ===
==== Nominee ====
- Greg Gianforte, incumbent governor (2021–present)
  - Running mate: Kristen Juras, incumbent lieutenant governor (2021–present)

==== Eliminated in primary ====
- Tanner Smith, state representative (2023–present)
  - Running mate: Randy Pinocci, member of the Montana Public Service Commission (2019–present)

=== Endorsements ===
Greg Gianforte

Organizations

- National Rifle Association Political Victory Fund
- Susan B. Anthony Pro-Life America

=== Results ===
Primary results by county: Gianforte: 50–60%; 60–70%; 70–80%; 80–90%

Republican primary results
Party	Candidate	Votes	%
Republican	Greg Gianforte (incumbent) Kristen Juras (incumbent)	144,752	75.2%
Republican	Tanner Smith Randy Pinocci	47,747	24.8%
Total votes		192,499	100.0%

== Democratic primary ==
=== Candidates ===
==== Nominee ====
- Ryan Busse, author and former vice president of sales at Kimber Manufacturing
  - Running mate: Raph Graybill, former chief legal counsel to Governor Steve Bullock and nominee for Attorney General in 2020

==== Eliminated in primary ====
- Jim Hunt, attorney and candidate for Montana's at-large congressional district in 2008
  - Running mate: Jerry Driscoll, former executive secretary of the Montana AFL-CIO

==== Withdrawn ====
- Shawn White Wolf, perennial candidate

=== Results ===
Primary results by county Busse: 50–60%; 60–70%; 70–80%; Hunt: 60–70%; Tie: 50%

Democratic primary results
Party	Candidate	Votes	%
Democratic	Ryan Busse Raph Graybill	69,184	70.9%
Democratic	Jim Hunt Jerry Driscoll	28,354	29.1%
Total votes		97,538	100.00%

== Libertarian primary ==
=== Candidates ===
==== Presumptive nominee ====
- Kaiser Leib, software engineer
  - Running mate: Matt Campbell, transportation engineer

== General election ==
=== Debate ===
Host	Date & Time	Link(s)	Participants	
Host	Date & Time	Link(s)	Ryan Busse (D)	Greg Gianforte (R)
Nonstop Local	October 16, 2024; 6:00pm MDT		Present	Present

=== Predictions ===
Source	Ranking	As of
The Cook Political Report	Solid R	June 13, 2024
Inside Elections	Solid R	July 14, 2023
Sabato's Crystal Ball	Safe R	June 4, 2024
RCP	Likely R	July 13, 2024
Elections Daily	Safe R	July 12, 2023
CNalysis	Solid R	August 17, 2024

=== Polling ===
Poll source	Date(s) administered	Sample size (Note: Key: A – all adults RV – registered voters LV – likely voters V – unclear)	Margin of error	Greg Gianforte (R)	Ryan Busse (D)	Other	Undecided
Montana State University	September 30 – October 16, 2024	760 (A)	± 3.56%	50%	31%	5% (Note: Kaiser Leib (L) with 5%)	14%
The New York Times/Siena College	October 5–8, 2024	656 (LV)	± 4.3%	57%	35%	–	8%
The New York Times/Siena College	October 5–8, 2024	656 (RV)	± 4.3%	57%	35%	–	9%
Public Opinion Strategies (R) (Note: Poll sponsored by the Montana Republican Party)	September 29 – October 1, 2024	500 (LV)	± 4.34%	55%	36%	1% (Note: Kaiser Leib (L) with 1%)	7%
Fabrizio Ward (R)/ David Binder Research (D) (Note: Poll sponsored by AARP.)	August 25–29, 2024	600 (LV)	± 4.0%	54%	38%	–	8%
Public Opinion Strategies (R)	August 18–20, 2024	500 (LV)	± 4.38%	53%	34%	4% (Note: Kaiser Leib (L) with 4%)	8%
Public Opinion Strategies (R)	June 11–13, 2024	500 (LV)	± 4.4%	54%	33%	5% (Note: Kaiser Leib (L) with 5%)	8%
SurveyUSA (Note: Poll sponsored by KULR-TV)	February 12–15, 2024	549 (LV)	± 4.5%	52%	30%	–	18%

=== Results ===
2024 Montana gubernatorial election
Party	Candidate	Votes	%	±%
Republican	Greg Gianforte (incumbent); Kristen Juras (incumbent)	354,569	58.86%	+4.43%
Democratic	Ryan Busse; Raph Graybill	232,644	38.62%	−2.94%
Libertarian	Kaiser Leib; Matt Campbell	15,191	2.52%	−1.49%
Total votes		602,404	100.00%	N/A
Turnout		612,423	76.57%	
Registered electors		799,849		
Republican hold				

==== By county ====
County	Greg Gianforte Republican		Ryan Busse Democratic		Kaiser Leib Libertarian		Margin		Total
County	Votes	%	Votes	%	Votes	%	Votes	%	Total
Beaverhead	4,139	71.72%	1,511	26.18%	121	2.10%	2,628	45.54%	5,771
Big Horn	2,206	49.56%	2,118	47.58%	127	2.85%	88	1.98%	4,451
Blaine	1,555	51.42%	1,387	45.87%	82	2.71%	168	5.56%	3,024
Broadwater	3,723	77.59%	930	19.38%	145	3.02%	2,793	58.21%	4,798
Carbon	4,812	65.46%	2,370	32.24%	169	2.30%	2,442	33.22%	7,351
Carter	774	91.60%	53	6.27%	18	2.13%	721	85.33%	845
Cascade	23,339	62.08%	13,324	35.44%	932	2.48%	10,015	26.64%	37,595
Chouteau	1,994	68.03%	888	30.30%	49	1.67%	1,106	37.73%	2,931
Custer	4,203	72.59%	1,417	24.47%	170	2.94%	2,786	48.12%	5,790
Daniels	787	83.10%	140	14.78%	20	2.11%	647	68.32%	947
Dawson	3,553	77.19%	926	20.12%	124	2.69%	2,627	57.07%	4,603
Deer Lodge	2,259	46.22%	2,487	50.88%	142	2.91%	-228	-4.66%	4,888
Fallon	1,302	87.44%	158	10.61%	29	1.95%	1,144	76.83%	1,489
Fergus	4,945	73.79%	1,602	23.91%	154	2.30%	3,343	49.89%	6,701
Flathead	41,539	65.88%	20,064	31.82%	1,451	2.30%	21,475	34.06%	63,054
Gallatin	32,843	47.06%	35,200	50.44%	1,742	2.50%	-2,357	-3.38%	69,785
Garfield	752	94.83%	34	4.29%	7	0.88%	718	90.54%	793
Glacier	1,955	38.37%	2,986	58.61%	154	3.02%	-1,031	-20.24%	5,095
Golden Valley	440	84.94%	67	12.93%	11	2.12%	373	72.01%	518
Granite	1,507	69.58%	613	28.30%	46	2.12%	894	41.27%	2,166
Hill	3,910	57.65%	2,666	39.31%	206	3.04%	1,244	18.34%	6,782
Jefferson	5,507	66.17%	2,605	31.30%	211	2.54%	2,902	34.87%	8,323
Judith Basin	1,090	80.27%	234	17.23%	34	2.50%	856	63.03%	1,358
Lake	9,937	58.97%	6,485	38.49%	428	2.54%	3,452	20.49%	16,850
Lewis and Clark	21,678	51.49%	19,360	45.98%	1,065	2.53%	2,318	5.51%	42,103
Liberty	787	78.70%	204	20.40%	9	0.90%	583	58.30%	1,000
Lincoln	8,820	75.05%	2,634	22.41%	298	2.54%	6,186	52.64%	11,752
Madison	4,611	71.25%	1,726	26.67%	135	2.09%	2,885	44.58%	6,472
McCone	922	85.13%	142	13.11%	19	1.75%	780	72.02%	1,083
Meagher	894	76.67%	245	21.01%	27	2.32%	649	55.66%	1,166
Mineral	2,026	71.97%	708	25.15%	81	2.88%	1,318	46.82%	2,815
Missoula	27,670	38.00%	43,378	59.58%	1,762	2.42%	-15,708	-21.57%	72,810
Musselshell	2,555	85.20%	369	12.30%	75	2.50%	2,186	72.89%	2,999
Park	5,947	50.72%	5,442	46.41%	336	2.87%	505	4.31%	11,725
Petroleum	287	86.97%	35	10.61%	8	2.42%	252	76.36%	330
Phillips	1,786	81.48%	368	16.79%	38	1.73%	1,418	64.69%	2,192
Pondera	2,054	72.07%	743	26.07%	53	1.86%	1,311	46.00%	2,850
Powder River	960	87.59%	123	11.22%	13	1.19%	837	76.37%	1,096
Powell	2,413	73.75%	735	22.46%	124	3.79%	1,678	51.28%	3,272
Prairie	540	78.49%	125	18.17%	23	3.34%	415	60.32%	688
Ravalli	20,740	69.60%	8,387	28.14%	673	2.26%	12,353	41.45%	29,800
Richland	4,324	82.72%	748	14.31%	155	2.97%	3,576	68.41%	5,227
Roosevelt	2,122	54.62%	1,656	42.63%	107	2.75%	466	11.99%	3,885
Rosebud	2,469	66.86%	1,129	30.57%	95	2.57%	1,340	36.28%	3,693
Sanders	6,088	75.68%	1,714	21.31%	242	3.01%	4,374	54.38%	8,044
Sheridan	1,365	72.30%	466	24.68%	57	3.02%	899	47.62%	1,888
Silver Bow	7,790	42.74%	9,866	54.13%	569	3.12%	-2,076	-11.39%	18,225
Stillwater	4,709	79.58%	1,076	18.18%	132	2.23%	3,633	61.40%	5,917
Sweet Grass	1,805	75.78%	510	21.41%	67	2.81%	1,295	54.37%	2,382
Teton	2,612	73.00%	891	24.90%	75	2.10%	1,721	48.10%	3,578
Toole	1,632	80.08%	355	17.42%	51	2.50%	1,277	62.66%	2,038
Treasure	384	85.91%	47	10.51%	16	3.58%	337	75.39%	447
Valley	3,009	73.80%	961	23.57%	107	2.62%	2,048	50.23%	4,077
Wheatland	854	79.22%	203	18.83%	21	1.95%	651	60.39%	1,078
Wibaux	454	83.61%	77	14.18%	12	2.21%	377	69.43%	543
Yellowstone	51,191	62.95%	27,956	34.38%	2,174	2.67%	23,235	28.57%	81,321
Totals	354,569	58.86%	232,644	38.62%	15,191	2.52%	121,925	20.24%	602,404

===== Counties that flipped from Democratic to Republican =====
- Blaine (largest city: Chinook)
- Big Horn (largest city: Hardin)
- Lewis and Clark (largest city: Helena)
- Roosevelt (largest city: Wolf Point)

==== By congressional district ====
Gianforte won both congressional districts.

District	Gianforte	Busse	Representative
1st	54%	43%	Ryan Zinke
2nd	64%	33%	Matt Rosendale (118th Congress)
2nd	64%	33%	Troy Downing (119th Congress)

== See also ==
- 2024 United States presidential election in Montana
- 2024 United States Senate election in Montana
- 2024 United States House of Representatives elections in Montana

== Notes ==
Partisan clients
