= Joseph Wenger (bishop) =

Joseph Wenger (1868–1956) was an Old Order Mennonite preacher, who, in the 1927 schism of the Weaverland Old Order Mennonite Conference was ordained bishop by bishops in Indiana, Michigan, and Virginia, and made head of a new branch broken from the Weaverland Conference. The branch, which split from Weaverland over the issue of adopting the automobile, became formally known as the Groffdale Conference Mennonite Church, the congregation where Wenger preached, but is also informally known as the Wenger Church.

== See also ==
- Horning Church, the remaining Weaverland faction, which allowed automobiles
