= COVID-19 pandemic in Montana =

Pandemic in Montana, United States

- Disease: COVID-19
- Pathogen: SARS-CoV-2
- Location: Montana, U.S.
- Index case: Broadwater, Gallatin, Silver Bow, and Yellowstone Counties
- Arrival date: March 13, 2020
- Confirmed cases: 333,758
- Active cases: 321
- Hospitalized cases: 18 (current); 14,414 (cumulative)
- Recovered: 329,725
- Deaths: 3,712

Government website
- covid19.mt.gov

The COVID-19 pandemic was confirmed to have reached the U.S. state of Montana on March 14, 2020. By June 4, 2021, the Montana Department of Public Health and Human Services (MDPHHS) had reported 112,260 positive cases and 1,632 deaths in the state.

== Timeline ==
=== March 2020 ===
==== March 11–12 ====
On March 11, Republican Governor Larry Hogan of Maryland announced that a part-time Montana and part-time Maryland resident tested positive for coronavirus in Anne Arundel County, Maryland. The woman in her 70s is a part-time resident of Lake County, and because this was her primary residence, the Centers for Disease Control and Prevention announced that she would be considered Montana's first case. The woman, however, had not been in Montana since November 2019 and did not come into contact with anyone in Montana. Her being counted as a Montana case is still not officially confirmed, however, as the MDPHHS does not report the case in their official totals.

On March 12, Governor Steve Bullock declared a state of emergency in Montana. Although no cases were confirmed in the state at the time, the emergency declaration helped prepare state and local governments for the future impact the disease would have on Montana.

==== March 13–14 ====
On March 13, Governor Bullock announced the first four cases of coronavirus that were within the state of Montana. The patients included a Gallatin County man in his 40s who traveled internationally, a Yellowstone County woman in her 50s who traveled internationally, a Silver Bow County man in his 50s who traveled to Washington, and a Broadwater County man in his 50s who also traveled to Washington.

Late on March 14, the governor's office announced the confirmation of two more positive cases, both of which are from Missoula County: a woman in her 30s who was identified as the Montana Commissioner of Higher Education and a man in his 50s. The commissioner and the man from Silver Bow County who was confirmed on March 13 were both present at a Board of Regents meeting in Dillon on March 5, where it is believed that the commissioner was exposed.

==== March 15–16 ====
Mid-day March 15, Governor Bullock issued an executive order that closed all public schools in the state for two weeks beginning March 16 and lasting until March 27. In addition, the governor ordered the suspension of all nursing home visits with the exception of end-of-life situations. Governor Bullock also suggested, but did not ban, the gathering of all groups over 50 people. The Lewis and Clark Library announced that they would close beginning on March 17 until further notice. All overdue were ended and the due date of all books was extended to May 1.

The city of Helena was placed under a 10-day-long state of emergency by Mayor Wilmot Collins on the afternoon of March 16. Governor Bullock announced that two new positive cases had been confirmed in Montana: a Missoula County man and a Yellowstone County woman, both of whom are in their 20s. This announcement increased the total number of cases to 8.

==== March 17–18 ====
Bishop Austin Vetter of the Roman Catholic Diocese of Helena announced on March 17 that all public Masses and related gatherings in the diocese would be banned until further notice. During a press conference, Governor Bullock announced an additional case in the state. He also announced that small businesses would be able to apply for Small Business Administration (SBA) loans and uninsured Montanans would have the cost of their coronavirus tests covered.

Late March 18, Governor Bullock's office announced two more positive cases in Montana, which increased the cases to 12 in the state. The patients were a Missoula County man in his 50s and a Gallatin County man in his 60s.

==== March 20–21 ====
On March 20, Governor Bullock announced measures that would close all sit-down and dine-in food services, all alcoholic beverage businesses, casinos, and other businesses that serve groups of people at one time. The closure began at 8:00 p.m. that same day and last until midnight on March 28.

By March 21, the Montana Department of Public Health confirmed an additional 6 cases, bringing the total to 27 cases of coronavirus in the state of Montana. Three additional cases were confirmed in Cascade County on the evening of March 21, bringing the total number of cases to at least 30.

=== June 2020 ===
==== June 1 ====
On June 1, Montana moved to phase 2 of the state's reopening plan.

The three Montana entrances to Yellowstone National Park were opened on June 1, after the south and east (Wyoming) entrances had been opened in mid-May.

Glacier National Park reopened its west gate entrance at West Glacier on June 8.

The Blackfeet Nation closed the east access roads to Glacier National Park on June 26, 2020.

=== July 2020 ===
In early July, multiple political candidates were self-isolating after potential exposure.

On July 10, 2020, Ravalli County reported its first death. In addition, the Northwest Montana State Fair and Rodeo voted to continue its planned date of August 19 to August 23.

On July 14, 2020, Yellowstone County reported its first death at MorningStar Senior Living.

On July 16, 2020, Lewis and Clark County reported its first death.

The University of Montana reported multiple cases as cases reached 2,234.

The Montana High School Association releases plans for fall sports.

In Southwest Montana, an outbreak caused restaurants to scale back.

=== August 2020 ===
On August 7, the Crow Nation ordered its members to go under a lockdown.

On August 28, 2020, 100 deaths had been reported.

Governor Bullock said the state would provide up to $20 million for COVID-19 preparations for the Montana State University system.

=== September 2020 ===
By September 13, the State passed over 9,000 cumulative cases of COVID-19.

On September 24, Montana passed the 11,000 mark in cumulative cases of the coronavirus.

=== October 2020 ===
On October 15, several cases were linked to the Let Freedom Ring concert held Oct. 3 in the Helena Valley. Patients were being transferred to other hospitals within the state as ICU units filled up. Yellowstone County hospitals were "nearly overwhelmed". Billings Clinic had confirmed contracts for refrigerated trucks for possible use as a temporary morgue.

On October 30, Montana passed the 30,000 mark in cumulative cases of coronavirus, also setting a daily record with 1,063 new confirmed cases.

=== December 2020 ===
On December 8, the Billings Clinic reported they only had four remaining ICU beds out of 56 total, and had discharged 454 COVID-19 patients since October 9.

=== September 2021 ===
Singer Jeffrey Foucault announced he would no longer play concerts in Montana, because Montana state law prohibited requiring audience members to provide proof of vaccination or a negative COVID-19 test.

On September 5, Montana hospitals were nearing or at capacity due to a surge in cases.

== Government response ==
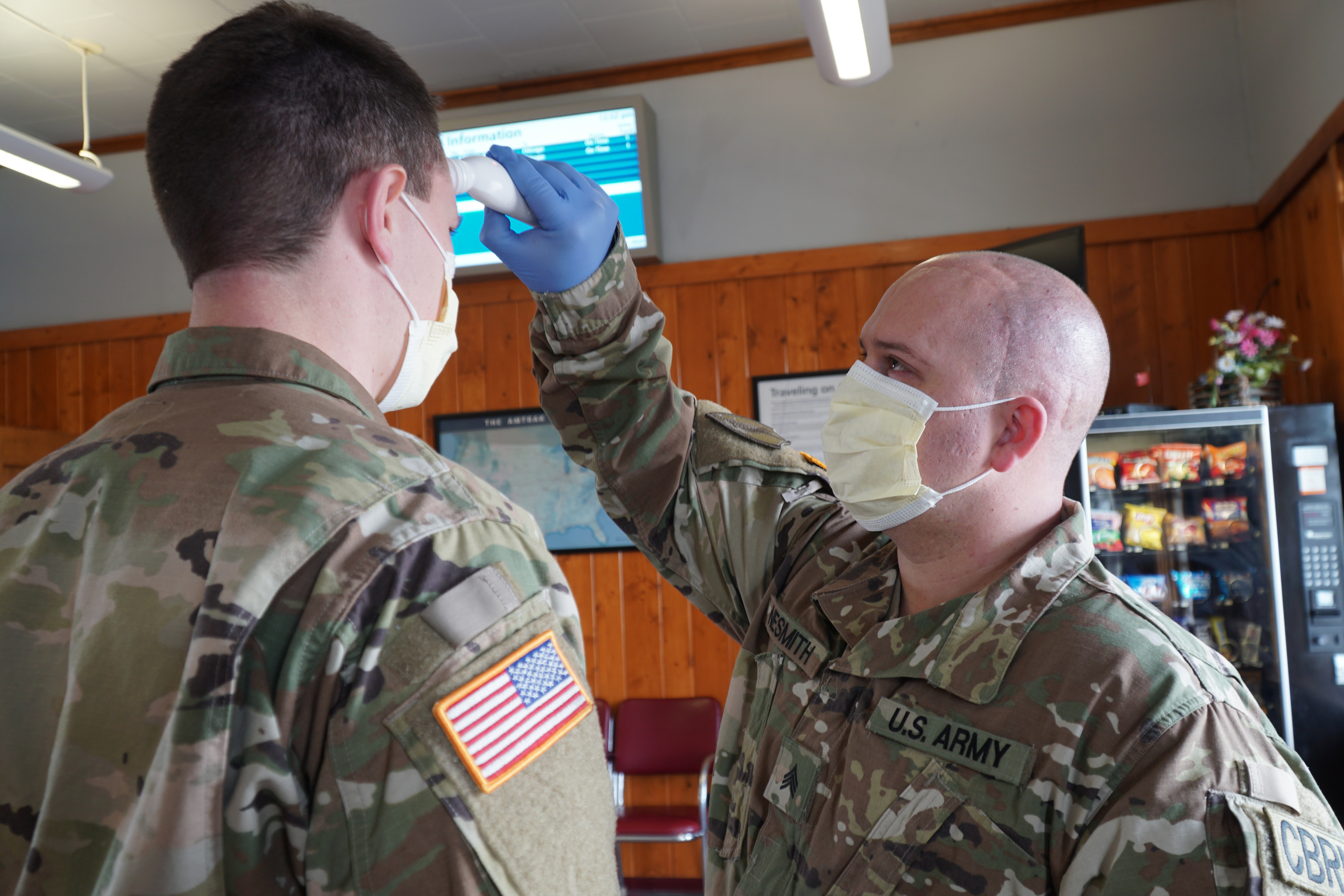
National Guard officer conducts a daily personal wellness verification in Shelby, Montana

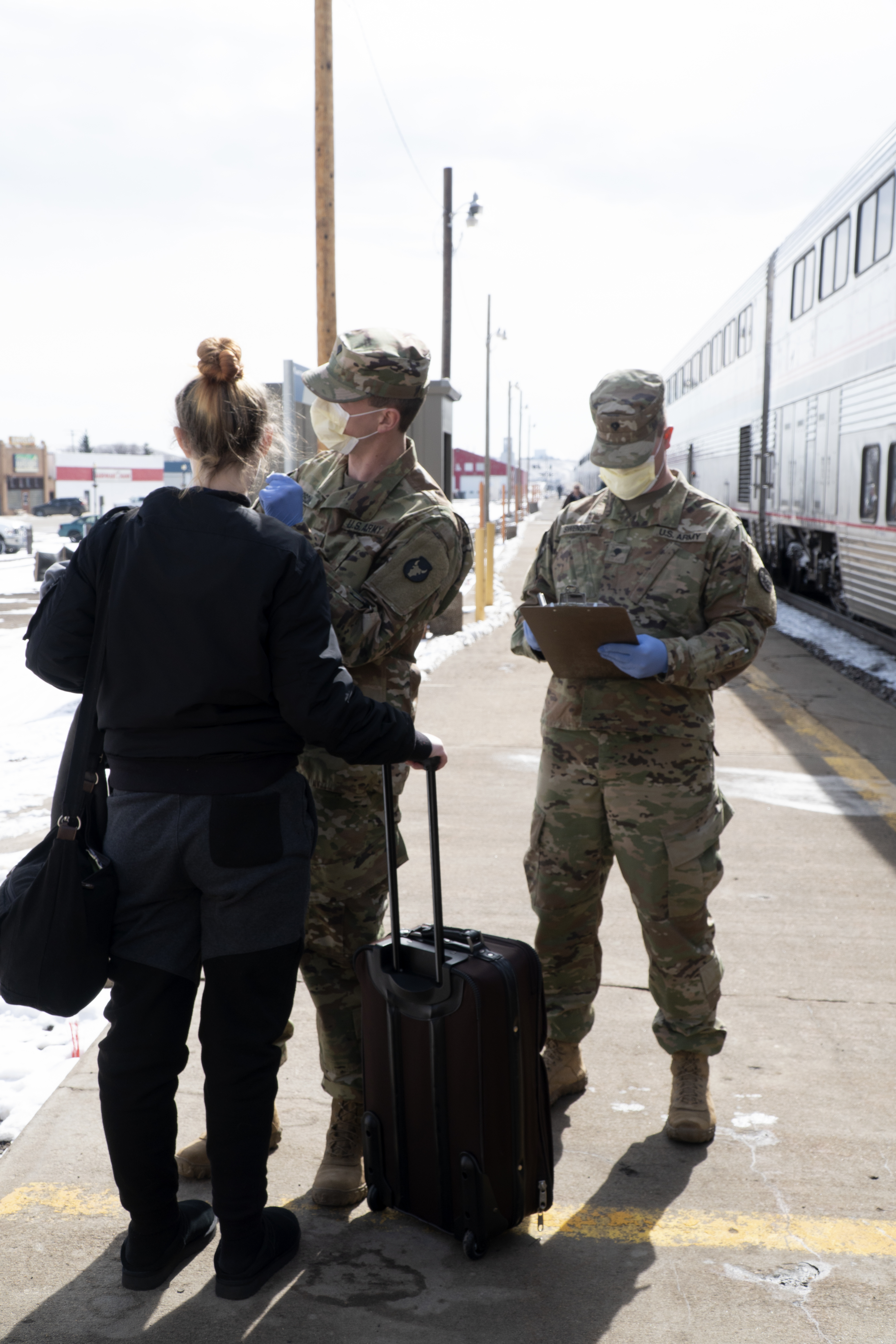
National Guard specialists screen an out of state traveler at the Amtrak Train Station in Shelby, Montana

Helena Mayor Wilmot Collins placed the city under a state of local disaster emergency on March 16, 2020. Lasting 10 days, the emergency declaration activated the response and recovery units of all city disaster plans. This also allowed for the possibility to declare a curfew or quarantine, though city officials said that none had been decided at that time.

Governor Bullock announced major closures in establishments that seat many people, including restaurants, alcohol beverage businesses, cigar bars, gyms and health clubs, movie theaters, nightclubs, bowling alleys, and casinos on March 20. Restaurants are allowed, under the order, to use delivery, walk-or-drive-up, or drive-thru services. Alcoholic beverage delivery was also allowed. The limitations began that same day at 8:00 p.m. and would expire at 11:59 p.m. on March 27.

Governor Bullock signed a pair of executive orders on March 26 enforcing a stay-at-home order for all Montana residents beginning at midnight on March 28 and ending on April 10. The executive order also forced all non-essential businesses to fully close.

On March 31, Governor Bullock announced that the Montana Facility Finance Authority Act would provide financing for "health care, medical and related facilities".

On April 3, Governor Bullock announced that Supplemental Nutrition Assistance Program benefits would no longer require interviews. Benefits would be "auto-renewed for another year as long as the state of emergency lasts". The supply of commodities provided through food banks, by tribal partners, and senior centers would be doubled.

On July 7, 2020, Governor Bullock announced order to test in assisted living facilities.

On July 15, Governor Bullock announced that masks would be required at enclosed public spaces in counties that currently have three or more active cases.

In September, eight staff members from the Missoula City-County Health Department spent two weeks working with the Northern Cheyenne Tribe to help set up a response effort.

On October 15, Governor Bullock "urged health care workers to consider paid volunteering" due to a shortage of medical workers.

=== Reopening ===
On April 17, 2020, the governor announced that he is working with a newly appointed COVID-19 task force on a "phased reopening" of Montana. The state must meet three benchmarks to begin the reopening:

- a sustained reduction in new COVID-19 cases for 14 days;
- hospitals must be able to safely treat all patients; and
- Montana must have the capacity to test all people with COVID-19 symptoms.

=== Ban on vaccination mandates of employees, including health care workers ===
In May 2021, Montana became the only state to ban employers from implementing vaccine mandates for their employees. This law was opposed by Montana Hospital Association. Planned vaccination mandates for health care workers by Benefis were suspended.

In September 2021, Governor Gianforte opposed the federal vaccine mandate for employers with more than 100 employees.

=== Montana Board of Regents ===
In September 2021, the Associated Students of the University of Montana requested the Montana Board of Regents to implement vaccine mandates and stronger mask requirements.

=== National Guard assistance to hospitals ===
The National Guard sent personnel to support hospitals in Billings and Missoula in September 2021. Assistance from the Guard was also requested in Bozeman.

== Testing ==
In the beginning of June 2020, the state began free, state-wide testing of asymptomatic individuals.

On September 19, 2020, The Billings Gazette reported that Montana was one of 20 states that has not released data or has incomplete data on rapid antigen tests.

On October 15, 2020, testing capacity and supplies were not experiencing shortages. The University of Montana and Montana State University had begun testing on their campuses.

== Impact on prisons ==
On April 1, 2020, Governor Bullock issued a directive to correctional facilities suspending all new transfers into the Department of Corrections custody to protect prison inmates and staff.

Until April 10, CoreCivic required prison inmates to sign a waiver in order to receive a face mask, which held the company harmless of any claims related to the masks. The Montana Department of Corrections' inmate workers have been producing masks for inmates.

By May 14, two positive COVID-19 cases had been found among inmates in state custody of seven inmates tested. Starting on May 15, 772 additional tests for coronavirus per month were made available to asymptomatic inmates and staff in Montana's prisons and correctional facilities.

On June 4, the Law and Justice Interim Committee asked the director of the Department of Corrections for a timeline for sentinel testing at all prison facilities and plans on how the department would handle an outbreak.

== Statistics ==
COVID-19 pandemic medical cases in Montana by county
County (Note: County where individuals with a positive case reside. Location of diagnosis and treatment may vary.)	Cases (Note: Reported confirmed and presumptive cases. Actual case numbers are probably higher.)	Deaths	Recov.	Vaccine	Nonres. (Note: County where nonresident was diagnosed. Not included in Montana totals.)	Population (Note: July 2019 population estimate from "U.S. Census Bureau Quick Facts: Montana". United States Census Bureau.)	Cases / 100k
56 / 56	333,758	3,712	329,725	574,737	250	1,068,778	31,228.0
Beaverhead	2,492	33	2,459	5,123	3	9,453	26,362.0
Big Horn	5,891	104	5,785	7,596	1	13,319	44,230.0
Blaine	2,655	34	2,611	3,468	0	6,681	39,739.6
Broadwater	1,557	22	1,535	2,088	0	6,237	24,963.9
Carbon	2,509	30	2,478	5,221	3	10,725	23,393.9
Carter	291	5	286	367	0	1,252	23,242.8
Cascade	30,426	377	30,021	39,240	20	81,366	37,394.0
Chouteau	1,373	15	1,358	2,142	0	5,635	24,365.6
Custer	3,551	54	3,495	4,925	4	11,402	31,143.7
Daniels	492	9	483	699	0	1,690	29,112.4
Dawson	2,782	61	2,721	3,266	3	8,613	32,300.0
Deer Lodge (Note: Consolidated city-county; Anaconda-Deer Lodge County)	3,314	30	3,284	5,923	1	9,140	36,258.2
Fallon	799	12	787	990	1	2,846	28,074.5
Fergus	2,995	63	2,929	5,299	2	11,050	27,104.1
Flathead	34,154	309	33,839	46,802	46	103,806	32,901.8
Gallatin	42,028	135	41,856	70,609	49	114,434	36,726.8
Garfield	251	3	248	300	0	1,258	19,952.3
Glacier	4,916	79	4,836	8,097	1	13,753	35,744.9
Golden Valley	178	5	173	373	0	821	21,680.9
Granite	680	10	670	1,301	1	3,379	20,124.3
Hill	5,467	77	5,384	9,452	0	16,484	33,165.5
Jefferson	3,194	27	3,167	6,464	0	12,221	26,135.3
Judith Basin	288	1	287	796	0	2,007	14,349.8
Lake	8,429	110	8,315	18,571	10	30,458	27,674.2
Lewis and Clark	22,092	205	21,881	41,364	6	69,432	31,818.2
Liberty	530	5	525	827	0	2,337	22,678.6
Lincoln	5,732	97	5,589	8,618	3	19,980	28,688.7
Madison	2,439	23	2,416	4,035	27	8,600	28,360.5
McCone	455	10	445	432	0	1,664	27,343.8
Meagher	599	12	587	973	1	1,862	32,169.7
Mineral	1,394	17	1,377	2,439	0	4,397	31,703.4
Missoula	34,418	228	34,156	78,715	17	119,600	28,777.6
Musselshell	1,113	31	1,082	1,672	0	4,633	24,023.3
Park	5,208	39	5,165	9,898	10	16,606	31,362.2
Petroleum	46	1	44	153	0	487	9,445.6
Phillips	1,153	31	1,120	1,790	0	3,954	29,160.3
Pondera	1,501	11	1,484	3,681	0	5,911	25,393.3
Powder River	421	10	410	454	0	1,682	25,029.7
Powell	2,240	32	2,206	4,006	1	6,890	32,510.9
Prairie	292	4	288	452	0	1,077	27,112.3
Ravalli	8,680	180	8,485	22,890	8	43,806	19,814.6
Richland	3,037	39	2,997	4,174	0	10,803	28,112.6
Roosevelt	4,103	78	4,023	5,902	0	11,004	37,286.4
Rosebud	3,133	63	3,070	4,943	0	8,937	35,056.5
Sanders	2,470	53	2,416	4,639	0	12,113	20,391.3
Sheridan	936	13	923	1,860	0	3,309	28,286.5
Silver Bow (Note: Consolidated city-county; City-County of Butte-Silver Bow)	10,155	139	10,004	22,247	5	34,915	29,084.9
Stillwater	1,748	33	1,714	4,061	2	9,642	18,129.0
Sweet Grass	923	13	910	1,574	3	3,737	24,699.0
Teton	1,570	29	1,540	2,734	0	6,147	25,540.9
Toole	1,424	25	1,397	2,224	2	4,736	30,067.6
Treasure	148	1	147	321	0	696	21,264.4
Valley	2,198	45	2,146	3,313	0	7,396	29,718.8
Wheatland	469	14	455	782	0	2,126	22,060.2
Wibaux	249	8	241	296	0	969	25,696.6
Yellowstone	52,170	618	51,475	84,156	20	161,300	32,343.5
Final update May 5, 2023, with data through the previous Wednesday; Data is publicly reported by Montana Department of Public Health and Human Services

=== Demographics ===
Source: Analysis by the Montana DPHHS, as of May 5, 2023.

== See also ==
- Timeline of the COVID-19 pandemic in the United States
- COVID-19 pandemic in the United States – for impact on the country
- COVID-19 pandemic – for impact on other countries
