= Wanger =

Wanger is a surname. Notable people with the name include:

- Ben Wanger (born 1997), American-Israeli baseball pitcher for Team Israel
- Irving Price Wanger (1852–1940), American politician
- Walter Wanger (1894–1968), American film producer
- Oliver Winston Wanger (born 1940), American judge
- Klaus Wanger (born 1941), Liechtenstein politician

== Other uses ==
- Obeah and wanga, an alternate spelling of wanga

== See also ==
- Wanger Township, Marshall County, Minnesota
- Wagner (disambiguation)
