= 2020 Montana Attorney General election =

- November 3, 2020
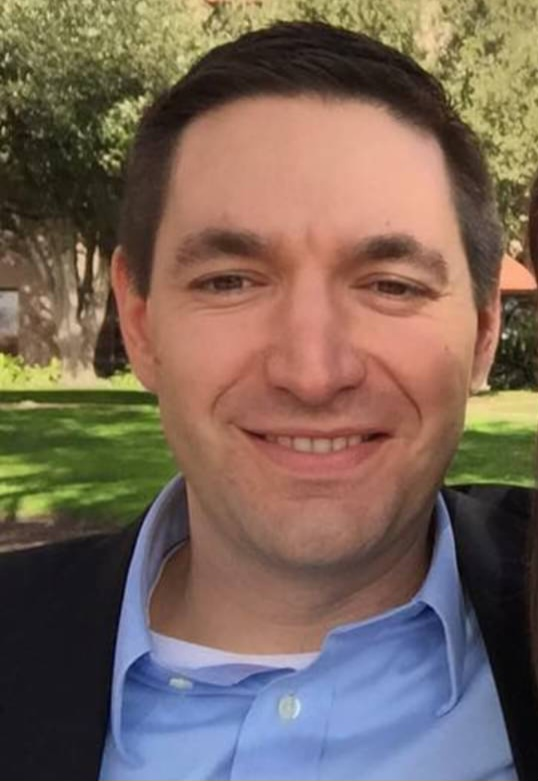

Nominee	Austin Knudsen	Raph Graybill
Party	Republican	Democratic
Popular vote	348,322	247,025
Percentage	58.51%	41.49%
- Knudsen: 50–60% 60–70% 70–80% 80–90% >90% Graybill: 50–60% 60–70% 70–80% 80–90% >90% No data
Attorney General before election
Tim Fox
Republican
Elected Attorney General
Austin Knudsen
Republican

The 2020 Montana Attorney General election was held on November 3, 2020, to elect the Attorney General of the U.S. state of Montana. Incumbent Republican Montana Attorney General Tim Fox was re-elected in 2016 with 67.7% of the vote. Fox was term-limited and was ineligible to run for re-election. Fox decided to run for the Governor of Montana election, losing the nomination to Greg Gianforte. Austin Knudsen defeated Jon Bennion in the Republican primary and defeated Democrat Raph Graybill in the general election by over 17 points.

== Republican primary ==
=== Candidates ===
==== Nominee ====
- Austin Knudsen, Roosevelt County Attorney, and former speaker of the Montana House of Representatives

==== Eliminated in primary ====
- Jon Bennion, chief deputy Attorney General

=== Results ===
Republican primary results
Party	Candidate	Votes	%
Republican	Austin Knudsen	116,113	59.8%
Republican	Jon Bennion	78,161	40.2%
Total votes		194,274	100.0

== Democratic primary ==
=== Candidates ===
==== Nominee ====
- Raph Graybill, chief legal counsel to Governor Steve Bullock

==== Eliminated in primary ====
- Kimberly Dudik, state representative

==== Withdrawn ====
- Jim Cossitt, bankruptcy attorney

==== Declined ====
- John Morrison, former Montana State Auditor

=== Results ===
Primary results by county: Graybill: 50–60%; 60–70%; 70–80%; Dudik: 50–60%

Democratic primary results
Party	Candidate	Votes	%
Democratic	Raph Graybill	79,772	57.1%
Democratic	Kimberly Dudik	59,963	42.9%
Total votes		139,735	100.0%

== Green primary ==
=== Candidates ===
==== Disqualified ====
- Roy Davis

=== Results ===
Green primary results
Party	Candidate	Votes	%
Green	Roy Davis	748	100.0%
Total votes		748	100.0%

== General election ==
=== Predictions ===
Source	Ranking	As of
The Cook Political Report	Tossup	June 25, 2020

=== Fundraising ===
Campaign finance reports as of October 14, 2020
Candidate (party)	Total receipts	Total disbursements	Cash on hand
Raph Graybill (D)	$725,288	$650,110	$75,178
Austin Knudsen (R)	$400,167	$359,831	$40,336

=== Polling ===
Poll source	Date(s) administered	Sample size	Margin of error	Austin Knudsen (R)	Raph Graybill (D)	Other	Undecided
Change Research	October 29 – November 2, 2020	920 (LV)	± 3.5%	50%	44%	5% (Note: "Don't recall" with 3%; Did not vote with 2%; Would not vote with 0%)	2%
Raph Graybill (Note: Poll conducted for Graybill's campaign)	Released September 3, 2020	–	–	38%	38%	20%	–

=== Results ===
2020 Montana Attorney General election
Party	Candidate	Votes	%	±%
Republican	Austin Knudsen	348,322	58.51%	▼9.16
Democratic	Raph Graybill	247,025	41.49%	▲9.16
Total votes		595,347	100.00%	
Republican hold				

==== By county ====
County	Austin Knudsen Republican		Raph Graybill Democratic		Margin		Total
County	Votes	%	Votes	%	Votes	%	Total
Beaverhead	3,957	70.46%	1,659	29.54%	2,298	40.92%	5,616
Big Horn	2,182	45.72%	2,591	54.28%	-409	-8.57%	4,773
Blaine	1,426	46.00%	1,674	54.00%	-248	-8.00%	3,100
Broadwater	3,139	77.76%	898	22.24%	2,241	55.51%	4,037
Carbon	4,591	65.49%	2,419	34.51%	2,172	30.98%	7,010
Carter	773	91.37%	73	8.63%	700	82.74%	846
Cascade	22,932	58.57%	16,219	41.43%	6,713	17.15%	39,151
Chouteau	1,912	65.06%	1,027	34.94%	885	30.11%	2,939
Custer	4,226	72.70%	1,587	27.30%	2,639	45.40%	5,813
Daniels	782	78.20%	218	21.80%	564	56.40%	1,000
Dawson	3,714	77.94%	1,051	22.06%	2,663	55.89%	4,765
Deer Lodge	2,096	43.35%	2,739	56.65%	-643	-13.30%	4,835
Fallon	1,343	89.00%	166	11.00%	1,177	78.00%	1,509
Fergus	4,874	75.81%	1,555	24.19%	3,319	51.63%	6,429
Flathead	39,327	66.62%	19,709	33.38%	19,618	33.23%	59,036
Gallatin	32,654	47.30%	36,382	52.70%	-3,728	-5.40%	69,036
Garfield	751	93.88%	49	6.13%	702	87.75%	800
Glacier	1,849	32.73%	3,801	67.27%	-1,952	-34.55%	5,650
Golden Valley	425	84.49%	78	15.51%	347	68.99%	503
Granite	1,428	68.89%	645	31.11%	783	37.77%	2,073
Hill	3,996	55.94%	3,147	44.06%	849	11.89%	7,143
Jefferson	5,313	65.75%	2,768	34.25%	2,545	31.49%	8,081
Judith Basin	1,065	79.78%	270	20.22%	795	59.55%	1,335
Lake	9,591	58.23%	6,881	41.77%	2,710	16.45%	16,472
Lewis and Clark	21,292	50.78%	20,634	49.22%	658	1.57%	41,926
Liberty	786	73.39%	285	26.61%	501	46.78%	1,071
Lincoln	8,766	75.73%	2,809	24.27%	5,957	51.46%	11,575
Madison	4,195	69.59%	1,833	30.41%	2,362	39.18%	6,028
McCone	956	85.59%	161	14.41%	795	71.17%	1,117
Meagher	849	77.53%	246	22.47%	603	55.07%	1,095
Mineral	1,722	71.10%	700	28.90%	1,022	42.20%	2,422
Missoula	27,700	39.30%	42,789	60.70%	-15,089	-21.41%	70,489
Musselshell	2,421	85.31%	417	14.69%	2,004	70.61%	2,838
Park	6,133	53.64%	5,301	46.36%	832	7.28%	11,434
Petroleum	306	88.44%	40	11.56%	266	76.88%	346
Phillips	1,927	81.65%	433	18.35%	1,494	63.31%	2,360
Pondera	2,032	68.49%	935	31.51%	1,097	36.97%	2,967
Powder River	977	87.86%	135	12.14%	842	75.72%	1,112
Powell	2,376	74.91%	796	25.09%	1,580	49.81%	3,172
Prairie	585	81.48%	133	18.52%	452	62.95%	718
Ravalli	19,484	69.06%	8,728	30.94%	10,756	38.13%	28,212
Richland	4,740	83.47%	939	16.53%	3,801	66.93%	5,679
Roosevelt	2,017	50.39%	1,986	49.61%	31	0.77%	4,003
Rosebud	2,503	67.03%	1,231	32.97%	1,272	34.07%	3,734
Sanders	5,689	75.37%	1,859	24.63%	3,830	50.74%	7,548
Sheridan	1,469	73.30%	535	26.70%	934	46.61%	2,004
Silver Bow	7,482	40.35%	11,061	59.65%	-3,579	-19.30%	18,543
Stillwater	4,486	79.37%	1,166	20.63%	3,320	58.74%	5,652
Sweet Grass	1,891	77.63%	545	22.37%	1,346	55.25%	2,436
Teton	2,632	71.68%	1,040	28.32%	1,592	43.36%	3,672
Toole	1,586	75.85%	505	24.15%	1,081	51.70%	2,091
Treasure	382	83.59%	75	16.41%	307	67.18%	457
Valley	3,089	73.46%	1,116	26.54%	1,973	46.92%	4,205
Wheatland	815	77.47%	237	22.53%	578	54.94%	1,052
Wibaux	496	84.93%	88	15.07%	408	69.86%	584
Yellowstone	52,192	62.99%	30,661	37.01%	21,531	25.99%	82,853
Totals	348,322	58.51%	247,025	41.49%	101,297	17.01%	595,347

Counties that flipped from Republican to Democratic

- Blaine (largest city: Chinook)
- Gallatin (largest city: Bozeman)
- Blaine (largest city: Chinook)
- Missoula (largest city: Missoula)

== Notes ==
Partisan clients
