= Raph Graybill =

American lawyer, politician (born 1989)

- Born: Raphael Jeffrey Carlisle Graybill; February 20, 1989 (age 37); Great Falls, Montana, U.S.
- Education: Columbia University (BA); Magdalen College, Oxford (MPhil); Yale University (JD)
- Political party: Democratic
- Spouse: Marisa Franklin (m. 2017)
- Children: 3

Raphael Jeffrey Carlisle "Raph" Graybill (born February 20, 1989) is an American attorney who served as chief legal counsel to Steve Bullock, the governor of Montana, from 2017 to 2021. Graybill was a candidate for attorney general of Montana in the 2020 general election, losing to Republican nominee Austin Knudsen. As running mate to Ryan Busse, Graybill ran unsuccessfully for lieutenant governor in Montana's 2024 gubernatorial election.

== Early life and education ==
Graybill is a fifth-generation native of Montana. He was born and raised in Great Falls and graduated from Great Falls High School. In 2010, Graybill earned a Bachelor of Arts degree in political science from Columbia University. He then studied as a Rhodes Scholar at Magdalen College, Oxford, where he earned a Master of Philosophy (MPhil) degree in political theory in 2012. Graybill received a Juris Doctor from Yale Law School in 2015.

Graybill served as an auxiliary police officer with the New York City Police Department for four years while studying at Columbia University.

== Career ==
In 2008, Graybill was elected as a Democratic National Committee delegate and had the distinction of being the youngest DNC delegate elected to the Montana Delegation.

After graduating from Yale Law School in 2015, Graybill served as the law clerk to Chief Judge Sidney R. Thomas of the U.S. Court of Appeals for the 9th Circuit in Billings, Montana. He then worked in private practice for the firm Susman Godfrey LLP, representing small businesses harmed by unfair business practices.

=== Chief legal counsel to the governor ===
In 2017, Montana Governor Steve Bullock appointed Graybill as chief legal counsel. As the lead attorney in the Montana Executive Branch, he represented the legal interests of the administration and its constituents. In this role, Graybill represented cases in the Supreme Court of Montana and United States Supreme Court and set precedents in easements and public land access, veto powers, and election laws including mail in ballots and dark money disclosure requirements.

Notable cases:

- Lamm v. Bullock (U.S. Supreme Court / U.S. District Court)
- Espinoza v. Montana Department of Revenue (U.S. Supreme Court)
- Janus v. AFSCME (U.S. Supreme Court)
- Bullock v. Internal Revenue Service (U.S. District Court)
- Bullock v. Fox (Montana Supreme Court)
- Montana Smoke Free Association v. Bullock (Montana District Court)
- Bullock v. Stapleton (Montana District Court)

==== COVID-19 response ====
As chief legal counsel, Graybill helped design Montana’s response to the COVID-19 pandemic in Montana. Graybill participated in drafting the governor’s executive orders, including No. 2-2020, that shaped new rules in the state designed to limit the spread of the virus. He also coordinated investigations and enforcement through the Montana Department of Health and Human Services.

Graybill was also charged with defending Montana's mail-in ballots for the November 3, 2020 election as part of the state's COVID-19 measures to protect voter and election worker safety during the pandemic. President Donald Trump's campaign brought a lawsuit against Montana Governor Bullock's mail-in ballot directive. Governor Bullock's directive allowed Montana counties to conduct elections using mail-in ballots if counties determined that in-person polling stations posed a significant public health risk. Graybill won the case for Montana in the U.S. District Court, and, when the Trump Campaign attempted to contest the decision in a petition to the U.S. Supreme Court, the Supreme court sided with Graybill and the State of Montana, which allowed counties to proceed with their plans to send out mail-in ballots.

=== 2020 Montana attorney general campaign ===
On May 8, 2019, Graybill announced his candidacy for Montana attorney general. Graybill won the June 2, 2020 Democratic primary, defeating state representative Kimberly Dudik. On November 3, 2020, Graybill lost the general election to Republican Austin Knudsen by 17 points.

=== 2024 Montana lieutenant governor campaign ===
On February 19, 2024 Democratic candidate for Montana governor Ryan Busse announced that Graybill would be his running mate for the upcoming gubernatorial election in 2024. The Busse-Graybill ticket went on to lose to incumbent Republican Governor Greg Gianforte by over 20 points.

== Personal life ==
In December 2017, Graybill married Marisa Meredith Franklin, the mathematics instructional coordinator at the Montana Office of Public Instruction. They have one daughter, Genevieve.
