= Ropp-Grabill House =

Historic house in Illinois, United States

- U.S. National Register of Historic Places
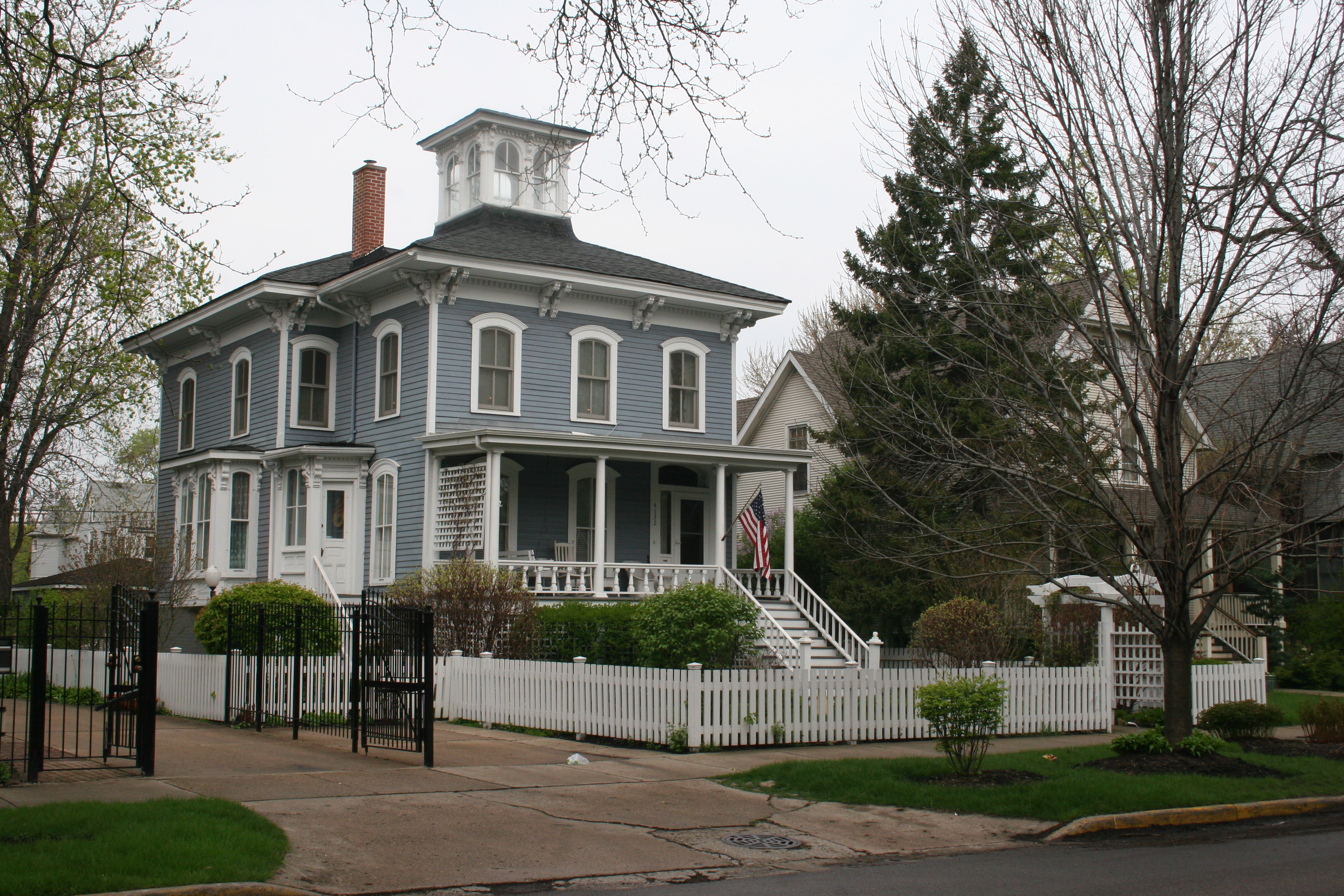

- Location within Chicago metropolitan area Location within Illinois Location within the United States
- Location: 4132 N. Keeler Ave., Chicago, Illinois
- Coordinates: 41°57′24″N 87°43′58″W
- Area: less than one acre
- Built: c. 1871
- Architectural style: Italianate
- NRHP reference No.: 85000840
- Added to NRHP: April 15, 1985

The Ropp-Grabill House is a historic house in the Irving Park neighborhood of Chicago, Illinois. While the house's construction date and original owners are unclear, it was built sometime in the early 1870s, making it part of the first wave of development in Irving Park. At the time, the neighborhood was still meant to be a wealthy garden suburb of Chicago, and it was not until later in the century that it became a dense neighborhood of the city. The house was designed in the Italianate style, a popular choice at the time, and includes oriel windows on its south side, bracketed eaves, and a cupola. Its name comes from two of its longtime tenants; the Ropp family lived in the house from 1891 until 1943, while the Grabill family lived there from 1943 through 1977.

The house was added to the National Register of Historic Places on April 15, 1985.
