= Dale L. Graybill =

Convicted of fraud

In 2005, Dale Graybill and his wife Shirley were charged in Connecticut with mail fraud and tax fraud. They had previously been charged in Alabama with securities fraud. They pleaded guilty to all of these.

== Crimes ==
=== Alabama ===
After a grand jury indictment, the Graybills were each arrested and charged with three counts of securities fraud involving a company named Memlock Systems. Memlock Systems was supposed to be an offshore trading corporation located in the Turks and Caicos Islands. Investor funds were supposedly put into an offshore bank account by wire transfers, but the investors never received a return on these investments. The Graybills were each released on a US$15,000 bond.

In 2005, Graybill pleaded guilty to one count of securities fraud and was sentenced to four years in prison. Shirley pleaded guilty to one count of conspiracy to commit securities fraud and received a one-year sentence. They were each ordered to pay restitution of US$150,000 to two Alabama victims, a Victim's Compensation Assessment of US$50, and court costs.

=== Connecticut ===
In 2005, the Graybills were charged in Connecticut with mail fraud and for filing a false 2002 income tax return. The Graybills claimed to have an entity called the "Triple Diamond Foundation" which they said had non-profit status with the IRS and which they claimed funded cancer research. During the 2002 tax year, they collected US$350,000 which they used as income instead of for its intended purpose, but did not report it as income.

Additionally, the FBI found that Graybill was running a Ponzi scheme. He would invite prospective investors to meetings in his home, where he would claim to have access to exclusive government-backed trading programs paying up to 25% per month. He took the collected funds and instead of investing them, paid "interest" to earlier investors and put the remainder towards his gambling debts and credit cards. The amount of money involved is reported to have been over US$40 million, and to have involved about one thousand investors

As part of the sentencing agreement, the Graybills agreed to plead guilty to the mail and tax fraud charges, admit to the Ponzi scheme, forfeit all cash and real estate derived from their fraud, and to compensate investors. Shirley Graybill also agreed to cooperate with federal investigators. In return, no further charges were filed, and Shirley would not have to go to prison.

Graybill was sentenced on January 26, 2009, to 48 months in jail. The judge ordered him to pay his victims restitution of over US$10 million, and to pay the IRS US$93,293.

Shirley was sentenced on January 30, 2009 to two years probation, the first four months of which were to be spent in in-home confinement. She also has to repay the IRS.,

As of Graybill's sentencing, the court-appointed receiver had only received US$817,000 to repay the bilked investors.
