= Austin Knudsen =

American politician (born 1980 or 1981)

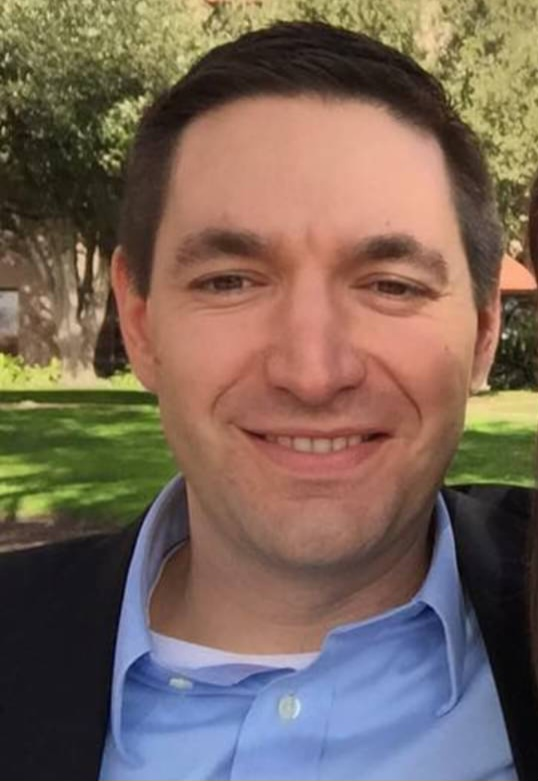
- Knudsen in 2016

25th Attorney General of Montana
- Incumbent
- Assumed office January 4, 2021
- Governor: Greg Gianforte
- Preceded by: Tim Fox

53rd Speaker of the Montana House of Representatives
- In office January 5, 2015 – January 7, 2019
- Preceded by: Mark Blasdel
- Succeeded by: Greg Hertz

Member of the Montana House of Representatives from the 34th district
- In office January 3, 2011 – January 7, 2019
- Preceded by: Julie French
- Succeeded by: Rhonda Knudsen

Personal details
- Born: Austin Miles Knudsen; 1980 or 1981 (age 45–46)
- Party: Republican
- Spouse: Christie
- Children: 3
- Relatives: Rhonda Knudsen (mother)
- Education: Montana State University (BA, BS); University of Montana (JD)

Austin Miles Knudsen (born 1980 or 1981) is an American lawyer and politician serving as the Attorney General of Montana. He formerly served as the Speaker of the Montana House of Representatives from 2015 to 2019. During his time in the Montana House from 2010 to 2018, he represented House District 36, which includes the Culbertson area.

== Early life and education ==
Knudsen was raised in Culbertson, Montana. He earned a Bachelor of Science in sociology and Bachelor of Arts in political science from Montana State University. He then earned a Juris Doctor from the Alexander Blewett III School of Law at the University of Montana.

== Career ==
Knudsen was elected to the Montana House of Representatives in 2010 and took office in 2011. From 2015 to 2019, Knudsen served as the Speaker of the Montana House.

In a 2016 op-ed in The Montana Standard, Knudsen expressed opposition to President Barack Obama's policy regarding allowing Syrian refugees to enter the United States. In an op-ed, Knudsen cited his grandfather's immigration from Denmark and claimed that Syrian refugees were not required to assimilate to American culture, and that "Much of this Muslim culture is foreign and strange to us."

Knudsen was unable to seek re-election to the House in 2018 due to term limits; he successfully sought election as Roosevelt County Attorney instead.

=== Attorney General of Montana ===
In May 2019, Knudsen announced his candidacy for Attorney General of Montana in the 2020 election. Knudsen defeated Jon Bennion, the state deputy Attorney General, in the Republican primary. He defeated Raph Graybill in the November general election, and was sworn in on January 4, 2021.

On September 5, 2023, special counsel Timothy Strauch filed 41 counts of prosecutorial misconduct against Knudsen with the Montana Office of Disciplinary Counsel, recommending "an adjudicatory panel from the commission be formed to hear the allegations and forward a recommendation to the Montana Supreme Court for possible disciplinary action." On October 23, 2024 the Commission on Practice recommended to the Montana Supreme Court that Knudsen’s license to practice law be suspended for three months for actions committed by himself or by Department of Justice attorneys who he was supervising, finding that he undermined public trust in the legal system by refusing to comply with a Montana Supreme Court order and disparaging justices. After all but two of the Montana Supreme Court justices recused themselves, a panel of mostly district court justices heard arguments on the disciplinary case in late March 2025.

On September 27, 2024 former Montana Highway Patrol Colonel Steve Lavin filed suit against Knudsen and the state claiming that he had been coerced into resigning in March 2024. Lavin's suit claimed that Knudsen was upset about the results of the internal personnel survey, and deceived Lavin into believing that Knudsen could legally fire him and deprive him of his pension benefits.

In the 2024 election, Knudsen admitted that he recruited his own primary opponent as a dummy candidate who would not campaign in order to raise more money, a potential violation of campaign finance laws.

Knudsen won the general election with almost 60% of the vote.

In 2026, the Federal Judicial Center removed a chapter on climate from its Reference Manual on Scientific Evidence after a group of Republican state attorneys general, led by Knudsen, said the chapter was biased. The chapter had been extensively vetted (including by a panel of experts from the National Academies of Sciences, Engineering and Medicine) and gone through multiple rounds of revisions before the Republicans complained about the chapter.

== Electoral history ==
Montana’s 36th District House of Representatives election, 2016
Party	Candidate	Votes	%
Republican	Austin Knudsen	4,278	77.49
Democratic	Evelyn Carlisle	1,243	22.51
Total votes		5,521	100

Montana Attorney General election, 2020
Party	Candidate	Votes	%
Republican	Austin Knudsen	348,322	58.51
Democratic	Raph Graybill	247,025	41.49
Total votes		595,347	100

Montana Attorney General election, 2024
Party	Candidate	Votes	%
Republican	Austin Knudsen	352,682	59.71
Democratic	Ben Alke	237,928	40.29
Total votes		590,610	100

== Personal life ==
Knudsen is married (wife, Christie) with three children. He is of Danish descent.

Political offices
Preceded by Mark Blasdel	Speaker of the Montana House of Representatives; 2015–2019	Succeeded by Greg Hertz
Legal offices
Preceded by Tim Fox	Attorney General of Montana; 2021–present	Incumbent
