= John Krehbiel Jr. =

American businessman (born 1938)

John H. Krehbiel Jr. (born 1938) is the former co-chairman of the Fortune 500 company Molex Incorporated, a global supplier of electronic & fiberoptic connectors, which he sold to Koch Industries for $7.2 billion in 2013. In 2006, he made the Forbes list of billionaires. Krehbiel is a Life Trustee of Illinois Institute of Technology.

== Personal life ==
Krehbiel and his wife Karen Gray-Krehbiel, a civic volunteer and philanthropist, live in Chicago. Krehbiel and his former wife Kennetha Love Krehbiel (Posy) had three children: Fred Love Krehbiel (Pete) (1965–2020), John H. Krehbiel III (Yaz) and Margaret V. Krehbiel (Meg). He has one brother, Fred A. Krehbiel.
