= Kimberly Dudik =

American legislator and attorney

Member of the Montana House of Representatives from the 94th district
- In office January 5, 2015 – January 4, 2021
- Preceded by: Ellie Boldman
- Succeeded by: Tom France

Member of the Montana House of Representatives from the 99th district
- In office January 7, 2013 – January 5, 2015
- Preceded by: Betsy Hands
- Succeeded by: Tom Steenberg

Personal details
- Born: November 4, 1974 (age 51) Frenchtown, Montana, U.S.
- Party: Democratic
- Education: Montana State University (BSN); University of Montana (JD); Johns Hopkins University (MPH)

Kimberly Dudik (born November 4, 1974) is an American politician and attorney who served as a member of the Montana House of Representatives from 2013 to 2021. Dudik was a candidate for attorney general of Montana in the 2020 Democratic primary.

== Early life and education ==
Dudík was born in Frenchtown, Montana. She earned a Bachelor of Science in nursing from Montana State University. She also has earned a J.D. degree from the University of Montana School of Law and a Master of Public Health from Johns Hopkins Bloomberg School of Public Health.

== Career ==
Dudik works as an attorney in private practice at Dudik Law P.L.L.C. She served as chair for the Office of State Public Defender Task Force. She co-founded the Public Policy Institute of the Rockies and developed a program to provide pro bono legal assistance to families impacted by the MMIP epidemic.

=== Montana House of Representatives ===
In 2015, Dudik worked with Republican Montana Attorney General Tim Fox to combat human trafficking in Montana. She carried House Bill 89 which substantially reformed Montana’s human trafficking laws. In 2017, Dudik led substantial bipartisan public defender reforms. That year, Dudik is thought to be the first sitting state legislator to give birth during a Montana legislative session, returning to the House floor four days later with the baby with her. Dudik led the National Foundation for Women Legislators as chairperson in 2018. Dudik served as the chairperson for the Council of State Governments West in 2019.

==== Committee assignments ====
During Dudik's tenure, she served on the House Appropriations Committee, the Joint Appropriations Subcommittee on Judicial Branch, Law Enforcement, and Justice, and the House Rules Committee. She also served on the Legislative Finance Committee from 2013 to 2020.

During the 2017 and 2019 legislative sessions, she vice chaired the House Rules Committee.

In 2019, Dudik served as a member of the Joint Select Committee on Settlement Accountability.

=== 2020 Montana attorney general campaign ===
On December 17, 2017, Dudik announced her candidacy for Montana attorney general in the 2020 election. She has reported approximately $101,000 in the quarter ending June 30, 2019. She loaned her campaign $85,000. She has repaid $30,000 of the loan. Dudik placed second in the Democratic primary after Raph Graybill.
