= 2024 Montana State Auditor election =

- November 5, 2024
Nominee	James Brown	John Repke
Party	Republican	Democratic
Popular vote	358,642	225,251
Percentage	61.42%	38.58%
- Brown: 50–60% 60–70% 70–80% 80–90% 90–100% Repke: 50–60% 60–70%
State Auditor before election
Troy Downing
Republican
Elected State Auditor
James Brown
Republican

The 2024 Montana State Auditor election took place on November 5, 2024, to elect the next state auditor of Montana. Incumbent Republican auditor Troy Downing did not seeking re-election, instead opting to run for U.S. House. Primary elections took place on June 4, 2024.

== Republican primary ==
=== Candidates ===
==== Nominee ====
- James Brown, president of the Montana Public Service Commission

==== Eliminated in primary ====
- John Jay Willoughby, insurance agent

==== Disqualified ====
- Keith Brownfield
- Steve Gunderson, state representative

==== Declined ====
- Troy Downing, incumbent state auditor (ran for U.S. House)

=== Results ===
Primary results by county: Brown: 50–60%; 60–70%; 70–80%; 80–90%

Republican primary results
Party	Candidate	Votes	%
Republican	James Brown	114,508	69.55%
Republican	John Jay Willoughby	50,131	30.45%
Total votes		164,639	100.00%

== Democratic primary ==
=== Candidates ===
==== Nominee ====
- John Repke, retired financial executive

==== Withdrew ====
- Jordan Ophus, U.S. Navy veteran

=== Results ===
Democratic primary results
Party	Candidate	Votes	%
Democratic	John Repke	92,296	100.00%
Total votes		92,296	100.00%

== General election ==
=== Polling ===
Poll source	Date(s) administered	Sample size (Note: Key: A – all adults RV – registered voters LV – likely voters V – unclear)	Margin of error	James Brown (R)	John Repke (D)	Other	Undecided
Public Opinion Strategies (R) (Note: Poll sponsored by the Montana Republican Party)	September 29 - October 1, 2024	500 (LV)	± 4.34%	49%	33%	2% (Note: "Won't Vote" with 1%; "Refused" with 1%)	16%

=== Results ===
2024 Montana State Auditor election
Party	Candidate	Votes	%	±%
Republican	James Brown	358,642	61.42%	+6.10
Democratic	John Repke	225,251	38.58%	–0.81
Total votes		583,893	100.00%	N/A
Republican hold				

==== By county ====
County	James Brown Republican		John Repke Democratic		Margin		Total
County	Votes	%	Votes	%	Votes	%	Total
Beaverhead	4,233	75.37%	1,383	24.63%	2,850	50.75%	5,616
Big Horn	2,148	48.83%	2,251	51.17%	-103	-2.34%	4,399
Blaine	1,524	51.18%	1,454	48.82%	70	2.35%	2,978
Broadwater	3,797	81.13%	883	18.87%	2,914	62.26%	4,680
Carbon	4,903	68.15%	2,291	31.85%	2,612	36.31%	7,194
Carter	760	92.23%	64	7.77%	696	84.47%	824
Cascade	22,728	62.33%	13,735	37.67%	8,993	24.66%	36,463
Chouteau	1,932	68.49%	889	31.51%	1,043	36.97%	2,821
Custer	4,265	76.01%	1,346	23.99%	2,919	52.02%	5,611
Daniels	764	84.42%	141	15.58%	623	68.84%	905
Dawson	3,590	80.13%	890	19.87%	2,700	60.27%	4,480
Deer Lodge	2,251	47.89%	2,449	52.11%	-198	-4.21%	4,700
Fallon	1,286	89.99%	143	10.01%	1,143	79.99%	1,429
Fergus	5,071	77.51%	1,471	22.49%	3,600	55.03%	6,542
Flathead	41,469	67.91%	19,592	32.09%	21,877	35.83%	61,061
Gallatin	34,485	51.42%	32,584	48.58%	1,901	2.83%	67,069
Garfield	741	96.11%	30	3.89%	711	92.22%	771
Glacier	1,921	38.22%	3,105	61.78%	-1,184	-23.56%	5,026
Golden Valley	447	86.63%	69	13.37%	378	73.26%	516
Granite	1,545	73.85%	547	26.15%	998	47.71%	2,092
Hill	3,934	59.70%	2,656	40.30%	1,278	19.39%	6,590
Jefferson	5,663	69.84%	2,445	30.16%	3,218	39.69%	8,108
Judith Basin	1,087	81.85%	241	18.15%	846	63.70%	1,328
Lake	10,038	61.00%	6,418	39.00%	3,620	22.00%	16,456
Lewis and Clark	21,997	53.58%	19,055	46.42%	2,942	7.17%	41,052
Liberty	773	80.77%	184	19.23%	589	61.55%	957
Lincoln	8,913	77.82%	2,540	22.18%	6,373	55.64%	11,453
Madison	4,661	74.98%	1,555	25.02%	3,106	49.97%	6,216
McCone	925	87.43%	133	12.57%	792	74.86%	1,058
Meagher	901	79.04%	239	20.96%	662	58.07%	1,140
Mineral	2,045	74.69%	693	25.31%	1,352	49.38%	2,738
Missoula	28,544	40.69%	41,609	59.31%	-13,065	-18.62%	70,153
Musselshell	2,574	87.46%	369	12.54%	2,205	74.92%	2,943
Park	6,271	55.12%	5,105	44.88%	1,166	10.25%	11,376
Petroleum	279	88.01%	38	11.99%	241	76.03%	317
Phillips	1,788	83.63%	350	16.37%	1,438	67.26%	2,138
Pondera	2,034	73.86%	720	26.14%	1,314	47.71%	2,754
Powder River	942	89.12%	115	10.88%	827	78.24%	1,057
Powell	2,507	78.44%	689	21.56%	1,818	56.88%	3,196
Prairie	561	83.23%	113	16.77%	448	66.47%	674
Ravalli	20,958	72.32%	8,022	27.68%	12,936	44.64%	28,980
Richland	4,340	85.53%	734	14.47%	3,606	71.07%	5,074
Roosevelt	2,017	53.06%	1,784	46.94%	233	6.13%	3,801
Rosebud	2,452	68.22%	1,142	31.78%	1,310	36.45%	3,594
Sanders	6,175	78.67%	1,674	21.33%	4,501	57.34%	7,849
Sheridan	1,322	74.73%	447	25.27%	875	49.46%	1,769
Silver Bow	8,027	45.88%	9,468	54.12%	-1,441	-8.24%	17,495
Stillwater	4,794	82.50%	1,017	17.50%	3,777	65.00%	5,811
Sweet Grass	1,853	79.49%	478	20.51%	1,375	58.99%	2,331
Teton	2,548	73.66%	911	26.34%	1,637	47.33%	3,459
Toole	1,597	80.49%	387	19.51%	1,210	60.99%	1,984
Treasure	377	87.27%	55	12.73%	322	74.54%	432
Valley	2,969	75.70%	953	24.30%	2,016	51.40%	3,922
Wheatland	863	81.19%	200	18.81%	663	62.37%	1,063
Wibaux	450	86.54%	70	13.46%	380	73.08%	520
Yellowstone	51,603	65.38%	27,325	34.62%	24,278	30.76%	78,928
Totals	358,642	61.42%	225,251	38.58%	133,391	22.85%	583,893

===== Counties that flipped from Democratic to Republican =====
- Blaine (largest city: Chinook)
- Gallatin (largest city: Bozeman)
- Roosevelt (largest city: Wolf Point)

==== By congressional district ====
Brown won both congressional districts.

District	Brown	Repke	Representative
1st	57%	43%	Ryan Zinke
2nd	66%	34%	Matt Rosendale (118th Congress)
2nd	66%	34%	Troy Downing (119th Congress)

== Notes ==
Partisan clients
