= 2020 Montana State Auditor election =

- November 3, 2020
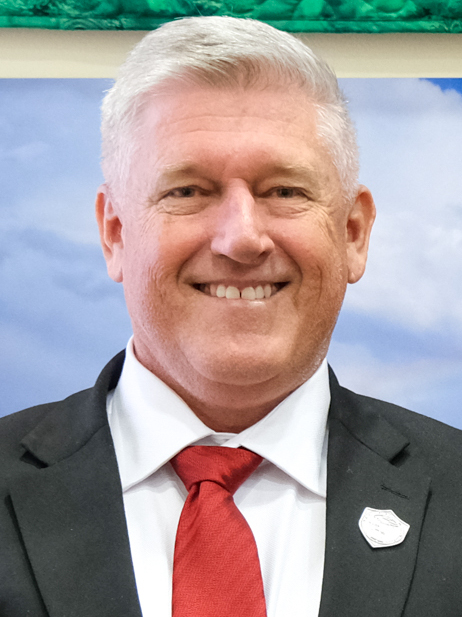

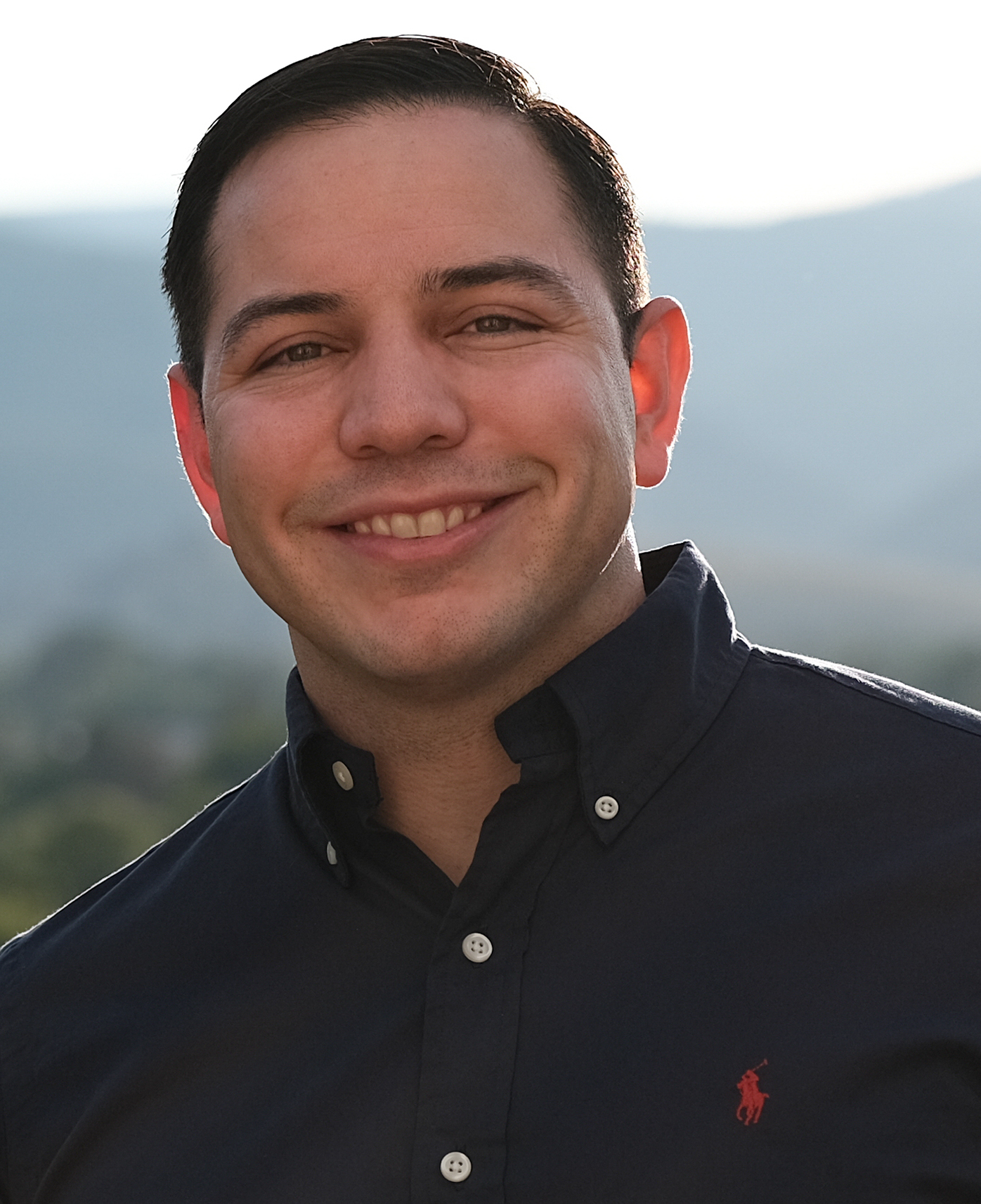

Nominee	Troy Downing	Shane Morigeau	Roger Roots
Party	Republican	Democratic	Libertarian
Popular vote	326,742	232,634	31,267
Percentage	55.32%	39.39%	5.29%
- County results Downing: 40–50% 50–60% 60–70% 70–80% 80–90% Morigeau: 40–50% 50–60% 60–70%
State Auditor before election
Matt Rosendale
Republican
Elected State Auditor
Troy Downing
Republican

The 2020 Montana State Auditor election took place on November 3, 2020, to elect the next state auditor of Montana. Incumbent Republican auditor Matt Rosendale did not seek re-election, instead opting to run for U.S. House. Republican businessman Troy Downing defeated Democratic state Representative Shane Morigeau to succeed Rosendale. Primary elections took place on June 2.

== Republican primary ==
=== Candidates ===
==== Nominee ====
- Troy Downing, businessman and candidate for U.S. Senate in 2018

==== Eliminated in primary ====
- Nelly Nicol, businesswoman
- Scott Tuxbury, insurance underwriting firm owner

==== Declined ====
- Matt Rosendale, incumbent state auditor (ran for U.S. House)

=== Results ===
Results by county Downing: 30–40%; 40–50%; 50–60%; 60–70%; Tuxbury: 40–50%

Republican primary results
Party	Candidate	Votes	%
Republican	Troy Downing	97,498	49.99%
Republican	Scott Tuxbury	58,227	29.85%
Republican	Nelly Nicol	39,312	20.16%
Write-in		10	0.01%
Total votes		195,047	100.00%

== Democratic primary ==
=== Candidates ===
==== Nominee ====
- Shane Morigeau, state representative

==== Eliminated in primary ====
- Mike Winsor, attorney

=== Results ===
Results by county Morigeau: 50–60%; 60–70%; 70–80%; Winsor: 50–60%

Democratic primary results
Party	Candidate	Votes	%
Democratic	Shane Morigeau	78,608	61.31%
Democratic	Mike Winsor	49,601	38.69%
Write-in		5	0.00%
Total votes		128,214	100.00%

== General election ==
=== Results ===
2020 Montana State Auditor election
Party	Candidate	Votes	%
Republican	Troy Downing	326,742	55.32%
Democratic	Shane Morigeau	232,634	39.39%
Libertarian	Roger Roots	31,267	5.29%
Total votes		590,643	100.00%
Republican hold			

==== By county ====
County	Troy Downing Republican		Shane Morigeau Democratic		Roger Roots Libertarian		Margin		Total
County	Votes	%	Votes	%	Votes	%	Votes	%	Total
Beaverhead	3,736	67.38%	1,510	27.23%	299	5.39%	2,226	40.14%	5,545
Big Horn	2,063	43.36%	2,522	53.01%	173	3.64%	-459	-9.65%	4,758
Blaine	1,362	44.29%	1,592	51.77%	121	3.93%	-230	-7.48%	3,075
Broadwater	3,035	75.91%	783	19.58%	180	4.50%	2,252	56.33%	3,998
Carbon	4,392	63.07%	2,253	32.35%	319	4.58%	2,139	30.72%	6,964
Carter	746	88.92%	66	7.87%	27	3.22%	680	81.05%	839
Cascade	22,262	57.44%	14,514	37.45%	1,979	5.11%	7,748	19.99%	38,755
Chouteau	1,838	63.36%	927	31.95%	136	4.69%	911	31.40%	2,901
Custer	4,003	69.41%	1,456	25.25%	308	5.34%	2,547	44.17%	5,767
Daniels	761	78.53%	181	18.68%	27	2.79%	580	59.86%	969
Dawson	3,516	74.63%	972	20.63%	223	4.73%	2,544	54.00%	4,711
Deer Lodge	1,923	40.14%	2,579	53.83%	289	6.03%	-656	-13.69%	4,791
Fallon	1,273	85.21%	164	10.98%	57	3.82%	1,109	74.23%	1,494
Fergus	4,691	73.77%	1,393	21.91%	275	4.32%	3,298	51.86%	6,359
Flathead	37,052	63.13%	18,845	32.11%	2,793	4.76%	18,207	31.02%	58,690
Gallatin	29,665	43.24%	33,881	49.39%	5,052	7.36%	-4,216	-6.15%	68,598
Garfield	710	89.76%	48	6.07%	33	4.17%	662	83.69%	791
Glacier	1,711	30.38%	3,705	65.78%	216	3.84%	-1,994	-35.40%	5,632
Golden Valley	410	82.66%	71	14.31%	15	3.02%	339	68.35%	496
Granite	1,331	64.86%	611	29.78%	110	5.36%	720	35.09%	2,052
Hill	3,684	52.06%	2,952	41.72%	440	6.22%	732	10.34%	7,076
Jefferson	5,036	62.82%	2,580	32.19%	400	4.99%	2,456	30.64%	8,016
Judith Basin	1,013	77.74%	240	18.42%	50	3.84%	773	59.32%	1,303
Lake	8,459	51.59%	7,263	44.29%	675	4.12%	1,196	7.29%	16,397
Lewis and Clark	20,104	48.42%	19,249	46.37%	2,163	5.21%	855	2.06%	41,516
Liberty	778	74.24%	234	22.33%	36	3.44%	544	51.91%	1,048
Lincoln	8,308	72.03%	2,701	23.42%	525	4.55%	5,607	48.61%	11,534
Madison	3,933	65.91%	1,662	27.85%	372	6.23%	2,271	38.06%	5,967
McCone	908	83.07%	149	13.63%	36	3.29%	759	69.44%	1,093
Meagher	813	74.86%	219	20.17%	54	4.97%	594	54.70%	1,086
Mineral	1,710	68.13%	659	26.25%	141	5.62%	1,051	41.87%	2,510
Missoula	25,013	35.71%	41,325	59.01%	3,697	5.28%	-16,312	-23.29%	70,035
Musselshell	2,292	81.19%	409	14.49%	122	4.32%	1,883	66.70%	2,823
Park	5,740	50.59%	4,960	43.72%	645	5.69%	780	6.88%	11,345
Petroleum	290	84.55%	36	10.50%	17	4.96%	254	74.05%	343
Phillips	1,886	80.81%	381	16.32%	67	2.87%	1,505	64.48%	2,334
Pondera	1,962	66.71%	860	29.24%	119	4.05%	1,102	37.47%	2,941
Powder River	929	84.61%	127	11.57%	42	3.83%	802	73.04%	1,098
Powell	2,207	70.49%	771	24.62%	153	4.89%	1,436	45.86%	3,131
Prairie	560	78.76%	118	16.60%	33	4.64%	442	62.17%	711
Ravalli	18,510	66.14%	8,307	29.68%	1,171	4.18%	10,203	36.45%	27,988
Richland	4,447	79.34%	877	15.65%	281	5.01%	3,570	63.69%	5,605
Roosevelt	1,825	46.62%	1,875	47.89%	215	5.49%	-50	-1.28%	3,915
Rosebud	2,340	62.92%	1,191	32.02%	188	5.06%	1,149	30.90%	3,719
Sanders	5,290	70.55%	1,870	24.94%	338	4.51%	3,420	45.61%	7,498
Sheridan	1,291	67.20%	524	27.28%	106	5.52%	767	39.93%	1,921
Silver Bow	6,864	37.50%	10,388	56.75%	1,052	5.75%	-3,524	-19.25%	18,304
Stillwater	4,284	75.81%	1,129	19.98%	238	4.21%	3,155	55.83%	5,651
Sweet Grass	1,757	72.42%	518	21.35%	151	6.22%	1,239	51.07%	2,426
Teton	2,500	69.21%	963	26.66%	149	4.13%	1,537	42.55%	3,612
Toole	1,529	73.90%	424	20.49%	116	5.61%	1,105	53.41%	2,069
Treasure	367	81.37%	75	16.63%	9	2.00%	292	64.75%	451
Valley	2,937	70.89%	991	23.92%	215	5.19%	1,946	46.97%	4,143
Wheatland	786	75.14%	208	19.89%	52	4.97%	578	55.26%	1,046
Wibaux	471	83.22%	76	13.43%	19	3.36%	395	69.79%	566
Yellowstone	49,439	60.12%	28,250	34.35%	4,548	5.53%	21,189	25.77%	82,237
Totals	326,742	55.32%	232,634	39.39%	31,267	5.29%	94,108	15.93%	590,643

==== Counties that flipped from Democratic to Republican ====
- Hill (largest city: Havre)
- Lewis and Clark (largest city: Helena)

==== Counties that flipped from Republican to Democratic ====
- Gallatin (largest city: Bozeman)
