= 2028 United States state auditor elections =

- November 7, 2028

9 state auditor offices 8 states; 1 territory (Note: Seat tallies and popular vote do not include states that do not elect state auditors or territorial state auditors.)
| | Majority party | Minority party |
|---|---|---|
| Party | Republican | Democratic |
- Democratic incumbent Republican incumbent Term-limited Republican; Nonpartisan; No election

The 2028 United States state auditor elections are scheduled to be held on November 7, 2028. The previous elections for this group of states and territory took place in 2024.

These elections will be held concurrently with several other federal, state, and local elections.

== Race summary ==
=== States ===
| State | State Auditor | Party | First elected | Last race | Status | Candidates |
|---|---|---|---|---|---|---|
| Montana | James Brown | Republican | 2024 | 61.4% R | Incumbent's intent unknown | TBD |
| North Carolina | Dave Boliek | Republican | 2024 | 49.4% R | Incumbent's intent unknown | TBD |
| North Dakota | Josh Gallion | Republican | 2016 | 68.7% R | Incumbent's intent unknown | TBD |
| Pennsylvania | Timothy DeFoor | Republican | 2020 | 51.1% R | Term-limited | TBD |
| Utah | Tina Cannon | Republican | 2024 | 63.5% R | Incumbent's intent unknown | TBD |
| Vermont | Tim Ashe | Democratic | 2026 | 69.1% D | Incumbent's intent unknown | TBD |
| Washington | Pat McCarthy | Democratic | 2016 | 58.0% D | Incumbent's intent unknown | TBD |
| West Virginia | Mark Hunt | Republican | 2024 | 68.7% R | Incumbent's intent unknown | TBD |

=== Territory ===
| Territory | State Auditor | Party | First elected | Last race | Status | Candidates |
|---|---|---|---|---|---|---|
| Guam | Benjamin Cruz | Nonpartisan (Note: The territorial auditor of Guam is elected on a nonpartisan basis, although individuals do affiliate with national parties. In Cruz's case, this is with the Democratic Party.) | 2018 (special) | 99.1% NP/D | Incumbent's intent unknown | TBD |

== Montana ==
State Auditor James Brown was elected in 2024 with 61.4% of the vote. He is eligible to run for re-election but has not yet stated if he will do so.

== North Carolina ==
State Auditor Dave Boliek was elected in 2024 with 49.4% of the vote. He is eligible to run for re-election but has not yet stated if he will do so.

== North Dakota ==
State Auditor Josh Gallion was re-elected in 2024 with 68.7% of the vote. He is eligible to run for re-election but has not yet stated if he will do so.

== Pennsylvania ==
Auditor General Timothy DeFoor was re-elected in 2024 with 51.1% of the vote. He is term-limited and ineligible to run for re-election.

Democratic state representative and 2024 nominee Malcolm Kenyatta is reportedly considering another run.

== Utah ==
State Auditor Tina Cannon was elected in 2024 with 63.5% of the vote. She is eligible to run for re-election but has not yet stated if she will do so.

== Vermont ==
Auditor of Accounts Tim Ashe was elected in 2026 with 69.1% of the vote. He is eligible to run for re-election but has not yet stated if he will do so.

== Washington ==
State Auditor Pat McCarthy was re-elected in 2024 with 58.0% of the vote. She is eligible to run for re-election but has not yet stated if she will do so.

== West Virginia ==
State Auditor Mark Hunt was elected in 2024 with 68.7% of the vote. He is eligible to run for re-election but has not yet stated if he will do so.

== Territories ==
=== Guam ===
Public Auditor Benjamin Cruz was re-elected in 2024 with 99.1% of the vote. He is eligible to run for re-election but has not yet stated if he will do so.

== See also ==
- 2028 United States elections
