= Kathleen Williams (politician) =

American politician

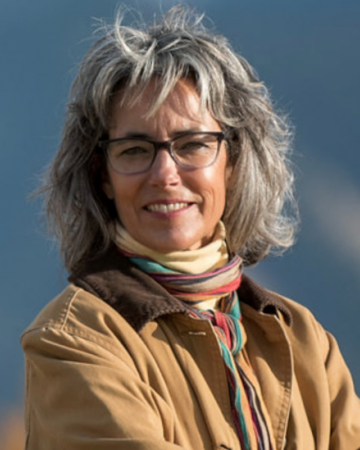
- Williams in 2021

Member of the Montana House of Representatives
- In office January 3, 2011 – January 2, 2017
- Preceded by: Brady Wiseman
- Succeeded by: Jim Hamilton
- Constituency: 65th district (2011–2015); 61st district (2015–2017)

Personal details
- Born: February 16, 1961 (age 65) Berkeley, California, U.S.
- Party: Democratic
- Education: University of California, Berkeley (BS); Colorado State University (MS)
- Website: Official website

Kathleen Williams (born February 16, 1961) is an American politician from Montana. A member of the Democratic Party, she served in the nonpartisan Environmental Quality Council of the Montana Legislature and the Montana Department of Fish, Wildlife and Parks. In 2010, she was elected to the Montana House of Representatives and served three two-year terms before retiring. In 2018 and 2020, Williams ran, unsuccessfully, as the Democratic nominee for Montana's at-large seat in the United States House of Representatives.

== Early life and education ==
Williams was born February 16, 1961, in a United States Army hospital in California. Her father was a U.S. Army soldier who served in World War II; much of her childhood was spent as a "military brat". When Williams was 11 years old, her 49-year-old mother was diagnosed with Alzheimer's disease. Williams assisted her father in caring for her mother, who died when Williams was in her teens.

Williams enrolled at the University of California, Berkeley. Taking her father's advice, she intended to earn a degree in business administration. After taking a class in forestry, she realized she was far more interested in natural resource policy. She switched majors, and graduated in 1983 with a Bachelor of Science in natural resource economics. After holding a series of jobs, Williams enrolled at Colorado State University where she received a master's degree in recreation resources. Her graduate thesis analyzed how much water was needed to support recreation on a wild and scenic river.

== Early career ==
Williams worked for a time for the United States Forest Service as well as several private conservation and recreation organizations in the west. She moved to Montana in 1995 to take a position as nonpartisan lead staffer at the Environmental Quality Council (EQC), a bipartisan committee of the Montana Legislature. (Note: The Environmental Quality Council was established by the Montana Environmental Policy Act of 1971. It meets during the interim between legislative sessions, and "generates information, reviews and appraises state programs, conducts investigations and studies, develops and recommends policy, and generally promotes a unified effort in carrying out state policy". It is strictly bipartisan, and is the only legislative committee which has members of the public with voting rights. Its staff are impartial and nonpolitical.) She focused on mining policy, recreation policy, and water quality issues for the committee. As an EQC staffer, she also served as a member of the staff of the Montana House of Representatives Committee on Natural Resources, where she took the lead on water policy issues.

Williams left the Environmental Quality Council after four years and took a job in 1999 as a Water Program Manager with the Montana Department of Fish, Wildlife and Parks. Her work focused on improving water flows and water quality in streams with low water flows. Williams served as the department's representative on the Governor's Drought Advisory Committee in 2003. She left the department in 2004 to become executive director of the Instream Flow Council, a nonprofit association of provincial, state, and territorial fish and wildlife agencies in the United States and Canada. (Note: The Instream Flow Council, founded in 1998, acts as a clearinghouse, collecting and distributing ideas and strategies for improving water flows and quality; collects, analyzes, and synthesizes the highest quality science on stream flows to develop standardized, accepted concepts and practices; and acts as an advocate for use of these concepts and practices; and provides technical assistance to states, provinces, and other governmental bodies.)

Williams also founded and managed Jetway Geographer, which published natural history guides and distributed them on airplanes.

== Montana state legislature ==
In 2007, the Montana state legislature adjourned without passing a state budget, deadlocked over how to spend a $1.4 billion surplus. A budget was passed only after a three-day special session. Angered by the legislature's inaction, Williams decided to run for office.

=== 2010 election ===
Williams was first elected to the Montana Legislature in 2010. She ran in House district 65, a heavily Democratic district which covered the southeast part of the city of Bozeman, Montana and which included Montana State University (MSU). Williams considered running for office as an independent, but chose to run as a Democrat. Three-term incumbent Brady Wiseman (D) was retiring from office, and Williams faced Bethan Letiecq in the Democratic primary election. Letiecq emphasized her experience lobbying the state legislature on grandparental rights and immigration, as well as her work for the General Accountability Office, a federal agency. She proposed a windfall profits tax on oil companies to fund improvements in education. Williams emphasized her work for the state legislature and state agencies, arguing she was better qualified to achieve compromise when contentious issues arose. She said she was not a single-issue candidate, pointing to her work with the Montana League of Women Voters on education and healthcare. She said her work in the legislature would focus on improving Montana's economy by promoting sustainable industries and on developing a state energy policy. Williams won the primary election by a vote of 255 to 164 (60.8 to 39.2 percent).

Williams faced Republican Nick Mahan in the general election. Mahan, who worked servicing magnetic resonance imaging equipment, proposed a 3-to-5 percent across-the-board cut to the state budget, elimination of the business equipment tax, and a limit on the number bills that could be introduced in each 90-day legislative session. He portrayed Williams as in favor of more bureaucracy and higher taxes. Williams was endorsed by Wiseman, and focused her campaign on the economy, education, and the environment. She continued to emphasize her experience working for the state legislature and state agencies. Williams won the general election by a vote of 1,288 to 665 (65.9 to 33.1 percent).

=== 2011 session of the Montana House of Representatives ===
Williams was assigned to the House agriculture, natural resources, and taxation committees. (Note: The Montana Legislature meets for 90 days in a single, biennial session held the odd-numbered year following a general election. Legislators are term limited to eight years of consecutive (not lifetime) service in the House, and eight years of consecutive service in the Senate. There is no longer a requirement that legislators remain out of office between term-limited periods.) She sponsored a successful bill (H.B. 615) which required health insurance companies to provide routine cancer treatment to patients in clinical trials.

Williams's first term in office occurred in the wake of the Great Recession of 2008–2010. She says she gained a much deeper appreciation for the importance of a diversified economy and workforce development during this period. Beginning with her first term and service on the House Committee on Natural Resources, Williams sought to protect the water rights of irrigators and the right of sport fishermen to healthy fisheries protected by adequate water flows.

=== 2012 election ===
Williams was re-elected to the Montana Legislature in 2012. She was unopposed in the 2012 Democratic primary. Williams faced Nick Mahan again in the general election. Mahan focused his campaign on improving the economy, opposing expansion in the size of government, lowering taxes, and "keeping MSU thriving". He proposed keeping some of the state's $460 million ($645,100,000 in 2025 dollars) budget surplus in reserve and returning the rest to taxpayers, expansion of energy exploration and production, and using a portion of the state natural resource tax to fund education. Mahan said he favored a tuition freeze at MSU so long as it did not impair the university. Williams once more focused on the economy, education and the environment. Her highest priorities in the legislature would also include healthcare accessibility and affordability; protecting stream access for sportsmen and recreational users; and more equitable funding for the state's school system. Williams said she was open to a tuition freeze at MSU, but also wanted to improve pay for faculty and staff at the school.

Williams won the general election by a vote of 2,298 to 989 (69.9 to 30.1 percent).

In November 2012, Williams was appointed to the Montana Reserved Water Rights Commission.

=== 2013 session of the Montana House of Representatives ===
Williams was assigned to the House agriculture, natural resources, rules, and taxation committees. She served as the Minority Vice Chair of the Agriculture Committee. Williams helped write a bill which ordered a study of whether water wells and septic systems should be exempt from environmental regulation. The legislature approved the study rather than adopt legislation that would have legalized this exemption.

During the 2013 legislative session, Williams took the lead in helping to win legislative approval for the Compact and Ordinance for the Flathead Reservation Water Rights Settlement, an agreement between the U.S. federal government, the state of Montana, and the Confederated Salish and Kootenai Tribes that defines water rights for the tribes as well as affects water use across western Montana. The tribes had threatened to sue to enforce their rights in the Montana Water Court, litigation that might have taken years to resolve and cost the state hundreds of millions of dollars. Negotiations on the compact had taken more than a decade, and legislative approval proved highly contentious.

Williams was appointed to and served as Minority Vice Chair of the Montana Legislature's Water Policy Committee, which met during the interim between the 2013 and 2015 legislative sessions to collect information, analyze, and report to the legislature concerning water policy issues in the state.

=== 2014 election ===
Williams was re-elected to the Montana Legislature in 2014. After the 2010 United States census, Montana's state legislature underwent redistricting. House district 65 shifted to northeast Bozeman. (Note: The new HD 65 was bounded largely by Aajker Creek, Huffine Lane, S. Cottonwood Road, Durston Road, N. Rouse Avenue, Interstate 90, and E. Valley Road.) House district 61 shifted to a large, less densely populated area north and east of the old House district 65. (Note: New HD 61 was largely bounded by a jagged arc running northeast and then southeast between N. 19th Street and the intersection of Stone Creek Road and Bridger Canyon Road, south on Bridger Canyon Road to Jackson Creek Road, Jackson Creek Road to Whisper Ridge Trail, due south to about Trail Creek Road, due west to about Goose Creek Road, due south to Bear Canyon Road/Forest Service Road 711, due west to Cottonwood Canyon Road, Cottonwood Canyon Road to S. Cottonwood Road, following S. Cottonwood Rd. and S. 19th Avenue to Goldenstein Lane, and then Sourdough Road and Church Avenue north to Interstate 90 and then northwest to its origin point.) MSU was shifted into House district 63. The local newspaper described Williams' new district as leaning Democratic.

Williams was unopposed in the 2014 Democratic primary. Williams faced Nick Mahan for a third time in the general election. Mahan campaigned on reducing the size of government and promoting the free market. He proposed using state energy production taxes to fund a statewide college tuition aid program and infrastructure improvements in eastern Montana, scaling back regulations on energy production, and transferring federally owned land to state control. Mahan opposed Medicaid expansion, disclaimed a belief in climate change, and called many people in eastern Montana and those who used Medicaid "welfare-dependent". Williams campaigned primarily on healthcare. She said her legislative focus would be on healthcare issues "that really need to be fixed", such as lowering prescription drug costs. Although she said she would consider Medicaid expansion, she advocated first having a "broad dialogue" on healthcare that would consider a wide range of solutions. Other issues she intended to work on included the deregulation of non-hazardous homemade foods, improving tax equity to reduce property tax burdens for people on fixed incomes, eliminating the tax holiday on new oil and natural gas wells and using the revenue for public schools, and improving the state's railroad plan to reduce emergency service response times.

Williams won the general election by a vote of 2,975 to 2,187 (57.6 to 42.4 percent).

=== 2015 session of the Montana House of Representatives ===
Williams was assigned to the House agriculture, natural resources, rules, and taxation committees. She served as the Minority Vice Chair of the Taxation Committee. (Note: The Bozeman Daily Chronicle reports that Williams at one time was also Vice Chair of the Committee on Natural Resources, but this is not born out of the Montana House of Representatives documents cited here.) Williams introduced and won passage of HB 478, a food safety law that expanded the kind of homemade foods allowed to be sold at home, farmers' markets, mobile venues (such as food trucks), online, or at other public or private venues. Williams also introduced and won passage of HB 258, the Montana Benefit Corporation Act. The legislation authorized the establishment of for-profit public benefit corporations in the state.

Williams again agreed to shepherd the Compact and Ordinance for the Flathead Reservation Water Rights Settlement during the 2015 legislative session. She succeeded in winning the legislature's approval of the bill. She opposed two major tax cut bills supported by the Republican majority, arguing that piecemeal tax reform avoided the issue of overhauling the entire tax code and did not achieve property tax fairness for those on fixed incomes.

== Western Landowners Alliance ==
After serving three terms in the Montana House of Representatives, Williams declined to seek re-election in 2016. She later said she decided not to seek a fourth term in the Montana House of Representatives in order to run for federal office.

In 2014, Williams took a position as an associate director for water policy issues at the Western Landowners Alliance, a nonprofit group of private landowners that formed in 2011 to serve as a clearinghouse on science and strategies to create economically viable, sustainable ranches and other working lands while also protecting watersheds and wildlife.

== U.S. House of Representatives ==
=== 2018 ===
==== June 2018 Democratic primary ====
On October 24, 2017, Williams announced she would enter the Democratic Party primary to represent Montana's at-large district in the U.S. House of Representatives. Most political observers considered her candidacy a "long shot". Williams entered an already-crowded field of challengers that included John Heenan, an attorney from Billings (the state's largest city); Grant Kier, director of a Missoula-based nonprofit conservation organization; Lynda Moss, a former state legislator; and Tom Woods, also a former state legislator. She also entered the election relatively late, months after the first two candidates declared. Williams also trailed in fundraising: at the end of 2017, Heenan and Kier both had raised more than $250,000 to Williams's $73,000. (Note: Williams did not pass the $250,000 fundraising mark until May 2018.)

In announcing her candidacy, Williams said her top two issues were healthcare and tax reform. She believed the Tax Cuts and Jobs Act of 2017, promoted and signed into law by President Donald Trump, was fiscally irresponsible. She pledged that as a member of Congress, she would protect broad health insurance coverage for all Montanans and lower insurance and prescription drug costs; (Note: Although a supporter of the Patient Protection and Affordable Care Act (Obamacare), she believed it needed extensive improvement to lower the cost of insurance.) improve spending on education and workforce development; protect the right to form a union; end discrimination in all forms; protect public lands; restore civility and integrity to Congress; and reassert the congressional role in foreign affairs. She also advocated improving economic diversity in Montana to ensure economic growth, and protecting economic development programs aimed at rural areas (such as the Farm Bill, funding for rural healthcare, and the USDA Rural Development agency). A proponent of legal immigration, Williams said she supported ideas put forth by border-state legislators to use modern technology to strengthen the border with Mexico. She opposed tariffs because they hurt Montana's agricultural exporters.

Williams began her campaign emphasizing her experience and success as a Democratic lawmaker in a Republican-controlled legislature, her ability to appeal to both parties while serving as nonpartisan legislative staff, and her work for private farmers and ranchers in promoting conservation. Williams also laid claim to the legacy of Republican feminist and legendary Montana politician Jeannette Rankin, saying she hoped to be Rankin's "long overdue successor".

Williams adopted a campaign strategy of visiting "all corners of the state". She traveled in her own Prius and pickup truck, towing a camper behind her. At one point, she drove more than 1,100 miles (1,800 km) crisscrossing the state in a single week. She emphasized her plan to allow people 55-to-64 years of age to buy into Medicare and her proposal to allow Medicare to bargain with pharmaceutical companies in order to reduce prescription drug prices. She also began emphasizing a return to civility in Congress. Lacking the funds to run television advertisements statewide, Williams's ad buys focused on geographic areas where she believed she could boost her vote totals (such as Missoula County). Ads on her healthcare ideas featured her work helping constituents and her own mother's battle with Alzheimer's disease, which political observers felt were highly effective.

After the shooting at Marjory Stoneman Douglas High School in Parkland, Florida, Williams came out with several gun control proposals. A gun owner, hunter, and sport shooter, Williams advocated for universal background checks and a ban on bump stocks. She also proposed banning the use of AR-15 style rifles outside of controlled environments like shooting ranges. She also proposed that Congress regulate military assault-style weapons the same way it regulates machine guns.

Despite being outspent roughly two-to-one, Williams won the June 5 Democratic primary with 37,146 votes (33.5 percent of votes cast). John Heenan came in second with 35,154 votes (31.7 percent), and Grant Kier had 26,832 votes (24.2 percent). Williams won nearly half of the state's counties. Robert Saldin, a professor of political science at the University of Montana, observed that where Williams didn't win, she came in second. Moreover, although other candidates showed large vote totals only in pockets across the state, Williams ran strongly statewide. Voter turnout was particularly high in Gallatin County, where Williams resides. A record 12,707 primary votes were cast there. This helped to offset Heenan's vote totals in his home county of Yellowstone, Montana's most populous county. Williams' targeted advertising strategy also paid off in Missoula. Williams polled nearly as many votes as Kier in his home county of Missoula. She won four of the five surrounding counties as well.

==== November 2018 general election ====
Williams received endorsements from different Montana newspapers over Gianforte. Amongst them were the Billings Gazette, the Bozeman Daily Chronicle, and the Missoulian

Williams lost the general election with 233,284 votes (46.2%) against incumbent Greg Gianforte, who received 256,611 votes (50.9%), and Libertarian Party Candidate Elinor Swanson (2.9%).

=== 2020 ===
Williams was again the Democratic nominee for the House of Representatives in 2020, losing to State Auditor Matt Rosendale.

== Political positions ==
=== Health care ===
Williams has said her number one priority is health care policy because she believes health care in Montana is too expensive. She supports preserving affordable insurance coverage for people with pre-existing conditions and would allow people aged 55 to 64 to buy in to Medicare if they prefer it over their other insurance options. She seeks to lower the cost of prescription drugs. She would fight the Trump administration's decision to allow businesses to pursue new uses for asbestos.

=== Local issues ===
Williams believes the Montana government has ignored regional concerns of residents, especially in rural areas. She traveled over 42,000 miles in her hybrid car to talk to locals, and keeps a running list of local concerns from every stop along with the name and contact numbers of the people who raised the concerns. For example, she would pursue an irrigation project for sugar beet farmers in Sidney, build a levee to protect Miles City from flooding, and address the 20-year asbestos health crisis in Libby.

== Personal life ==
Williams is an avid fisher, hiker, hunter, and skier. She is a gun owner and has participated in shooting sports. Williams is a member of and has worked extensively with the League of Women Voters, and is the former vice chair of the Greater Gallatin Watershed Council (a water conservation and water quality group in Gallatin County).

Williams married Tom Pick, an agricultural development contractor during the Iraq War, in the rotunda of the Montana State Capitol building in 2001. She became stepmother to his two adult sons, Calen and Sander. Pick died in January 2016 at the age of 67.

== Electoral results ==
=== 2010 ===
2010 Montana House of Representatives District 65, Democratic Party primary election
Party	Candidate	Votes	%
Democratic	Kathleen Williams	255	60.8
Democratic	Bethany Letiecq	164	39.2

2010 Montana House of Representatives District 65, general election
Party	Candidate	Votes	%
Democratic	Kathleen Williams	1,288	65.9
Republican	Nick Mahan	665	34.1

=== 2012 ===
2012 Montana House of Representatives District 65, Democratic Party primary election
Party	Candidate	Votes	%
Democratic	Kathleen Williams	500	100.0

2012 Montana House of Representatives District 65, general election
Party	Candidate	Votes	%
Democratic	Kathleen Williams	2,298	69.9
Republican	Nick Mahan	989	30.1

=== 2014 ===
2014 Montana House of Representatives District 61, Democratic Party primary election
Party	Candidate	Votes	%
Democratic	Kathleen Williams	945	100.0

2014 Montana House of Representatives District 61, general election
Party	Candidate	Votes	%
Democratic	Kathleen Williams	2,975	57.6
Republican	Nick Mahan	2,187	42.4

=== 2018 ===
2018 United States House of Representatives, Montana At-Large, Democratic Party primary election
Party	Candidate	Votes	%
Democratic	Kathleen Williams	37,146	33.5
Democratic	John Heenan	35,154	31.7
Democratic	Grant Kier	26,832	24.2
Democratic	Lynda Moss	5,592	5.0
Democratic	John Meyer	3,684	3.3
Democratic	Jared Pettinato	2,440	2.2

2018 United States House of Representatives election in Montana
Party	Candidate	Votes	%
Republican	Greg Gianforte (incumbent)	256,661	50.9%
Democratic	Kathleen Williams	233,284	46.3%

=== 2020 ===
2020 Montana at-large congressional district Democratic primary
Party	Candidate	Votes	%
Democratic	Kathleen Williams	125,098	90.0%
Democratic	Tom Winter	14,370	10.0%
Total votes		139,468	100.0%

Montana's at-large congressional district, 2020
Party	Candidate	Votes	%	±%
Republican	Matt Rosendale	339,169	56.39%	+5.51%
Democratic	Kathleen Williams	262,340	43.61%	−2.64%
Total votes		601,509	100.00%	
Republican hold				

== Bibliography ==
- Bello, A. Kyce (2011). "Continued Reading and Resources". In Bello, A. Kyce (ed.). The Return of the River: Writers, Scholars, and Citizens Speak On Behalf of the Santa Fe River. Santa Fe, N.M.: Sunstone Press. ISBN 9780865347816.
- Legislative Environmental Policy Office (2017). A Council Member's Guide to the Environmental Quality Council (PDF) (Report). Helena, Mont.: Legislative Environmental Policy Office, Montana Legislative Services Division.

Montana House of Representatives
Preceded by Brady Wiseman	Member of the Montana House of Representatives from the 65th district 2011–2015	Succeeded by Christopher Pope
Preceded by Joel Boniek	Member of the Montana House of Representatives from the 61st district 2015–2017	Succeeded by Jim Hamilton
