= Senator Squires =

Senator Squires may refer:

- Carolyn Squires (1940–2016), Montana State Senate
- Joel C. Squires (1819–1889), Wisconsin State Senate

== See also ==
- Cecil Clyde Squier (died 1951), Maryland State Senate
- Watson C. Squire (1838–1926), U.S. Senator from Washington from 1889 to 1897
