= Andrew B. Cook =

American politician (1864–1928)

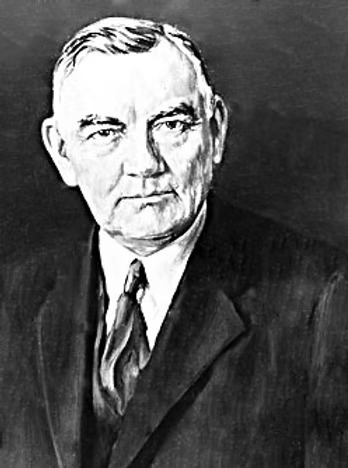

2nd Auditor of Montana
- In office 1893–1897
- Governor: John E. Rickards
- Preceded by: Edwin A. Kenney
- Succeeded by: Thomas W. Poindexter Jr.

Personal details
- Born: February 2, 1864; Dundee, Wisconsin, U.S.
- Died: November 24, 1928 (aged 64); Helena, Montana, U.S.
- Political party: Republican
- Spouse: Mary Morgan Cook (1908-?)

Andrew Braid Cook (February 2nd, 1864 – November, 24th 1928) was a Montana State Auditor from 1893–1897.

Cook was born on February 2nd, 1864 in Dundee, and died on November 24th, 1928, in Helena.

Party political offices
Preceded by Edwin A. Kenney	Republican nominee for Montana Auditor of State; 1893	Succeeded by Thomas W. Poindexter Jr.
Political offices
Preceded by Edwin A. Kenney	Montana State Auditor; 1893-1897	Succeeded by Thomas W. Poindexter Jr.
