= Adam Rosendale =

American politician and businessman

Member of the Montana House of Representatives from the 51st district
- In office January 2, 2017 – November 18, 2017
- Preceded by: Margaret MacDonald
- Succeeded by: Frank Fleming

Personal details
- Born: Centreville, Maryland, U.S.
- Party: Republican
- Relations: Matt Rosendale (father)

Adam Joseph Rosendale is an American politician and businessman who served as a member of the Montana House of Representatives for the 51st district in 2017.

== Early life and education ==
Adam Joseph Rosendale was born in Centreville, Maryland and lived in Billings, Montana. His father, Matt Rosendale, is a member of the United States House of Representatives.

== Career ==
Rosendale and his brother, Brien Rosendale, owned Atlas Contracting and had developed family property in Black Eagle, Montana into the Eagles Crossing development consisting of condominiums, homes, and businesses. Rosendale served briefly in the Montana House of Representatives, from January 2, 2017, to November 18, 2017. He resigned when he moved to Great Falls, Montana.
