= Teresa Henry =

American politician

Member of the Montana House of Representatives from the 96th district
- In office 2004 – January 3, 2011
- Succeeded by: Carolyn Squires

Personal details
- Born: August 14, 1952 (age 74) Port Huron, Michigan
- Party: Democratic Party
- Spouse: Stephen Egli
- Education: Mercy College of Detroit, University of California, San Francisco
- Profession: Nurse practitioner, assistant professor

Teresa Henry is an American politician and a former Democratic member of the Montana House of Representatives, who represented District 96 from 2004 to 2011.
