= Tom Facey =

American politician

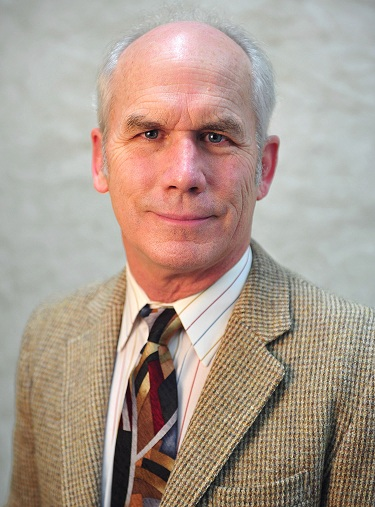

Member of the Montana Senate from the 50th district
- In office January 5, 2015 – January 7, 2019
- Preceded by: Cliff Larsen
- Succeeded by: Bryce Bennett

Member of the Montana Senate from the 48th district
- In office January 3, 2011 – January 5, 2015
- Preceded by: Carolyn Squires
- Succeeded by: Cynthia Wolken

Personal details
- Born: March 30, 1954 (age 72) Helena, Montana
- Party: Democratic
- Spouse: Maureen O'Malley
- Education: University of Montana
- Occupation: Teacher

Tom Facey (born March 30, 1954) is an American politician from Missoula, Montana. A Democrat, he served in the Montana House of Representatives and the Montana Senate. As of 2016 Facey has been the primary sponsor of 47 bills.

Facey served as a Minority Whip in the Senate during the 2015–2018 session.

In 2011, Facey was the primary sponsor of SB 276 intended to "generally revise deviate sexual conduct laws." More specifically, the bill seeks to bring Montana in line with the Supreme Court ruling that "the law that criminalizes homosexual acts is unconstitutional." The bill was tabled in a House committee.
