= Brady Wiseman =

American politician

Member of the Montana House of Representatives from the 65th district
- In office January 2005 – January 3, 2011
- Succeeded by: Kathleen Williams

Personal details
- Born: April 23, 1957 (age 69) Amarillo, Texas
- Party: Democratic
- Spouse: Cyndy Andrus
- Education: University of Montana
- Profession: software engineer

Brady Wiseman was a Democratic Party member of the Montana House of Representatives, representing District 65.

He led the House in opposition to the USA PATRIOT Act as invasive of privacy and a threat to civil liberties, and has fought the REAL ID Act on similar grounds.
