= Cynthia Wolken =

American politician

Member of the Montana Senate from the 48th district
- In office January 5, 2015 – February 16, 2018
- Preceded by: Tom Facey
- Succeeded by: Nate McConnell

Personal details
- Party: Democratic

Cynthia Wolken is a Democratic politician who served as member of the Montana Senate before becoming deputy director of the Montana Department of Corrections. She was first elected to Senate District 48 on November 4, 2014, representing part of Missoula, Montana.

She was named deputy director of the Montana Department of Corrections in January 2018. Her resignation from the state senate took effect on February 16, 2018. Nate McConnell was named as her replacement.

Montana Senate
Preceded by Tom Facey	Member of the Montana Senate from the 48th district 2015–2018	Succeeded by Nate McConnell
