= Nate McConnell =

American politician

Member of the Montana Senate from the 89th district
- In office March 2018 – November 9, 2020
- Preceded by: Cynthia Wolken
- Succeeded by: Shane Morigeau

Member of the Montana House of Representatives from the 89th district
- In office January 5, 2015 – March 2018
- Preceded by: Nancy Ballance
- Succeeded by: Dave Severson

Personal details
- Party: Democratic
- Education: University of New Mexico (BA); Southern Illinois University (JD)
- Profession: Lawyer
- Website: Official

Nate McConnell is a Democratic member of the Montana State Senate. He was previously part of the Montana House of Representatives, representing House District 89. He was first elected in 2014 and was reelected in 2016.

== Early life, education, and career ==
McConnell earned his J.D. from Southern Illinois University and became a sole practitioner in Missoula, Montana.

== Montana House of Representatives ==
In the 2014 primary, he defeated two fellow Democrats and faced no Republican opposition. In 2016, he defeated Republican Alex Krigsvold.

McConnell was selected to serve as a Democratic whip in November 2016.

== Montana Senate ==
In January 2018, Cynthia Wolken was named deputy director of the Montana Department of Corrections, and formally resigned from the Montana Senate in February 2018. McConnell was appointed by the Missoula County Commission to replace Wolken in the Montana Senate and was sworn in in March 2018.
