= 2018 United States Senate election in Montana =

- November 6, 2018
- Turnout: 71.53% (of registered voters) ▲
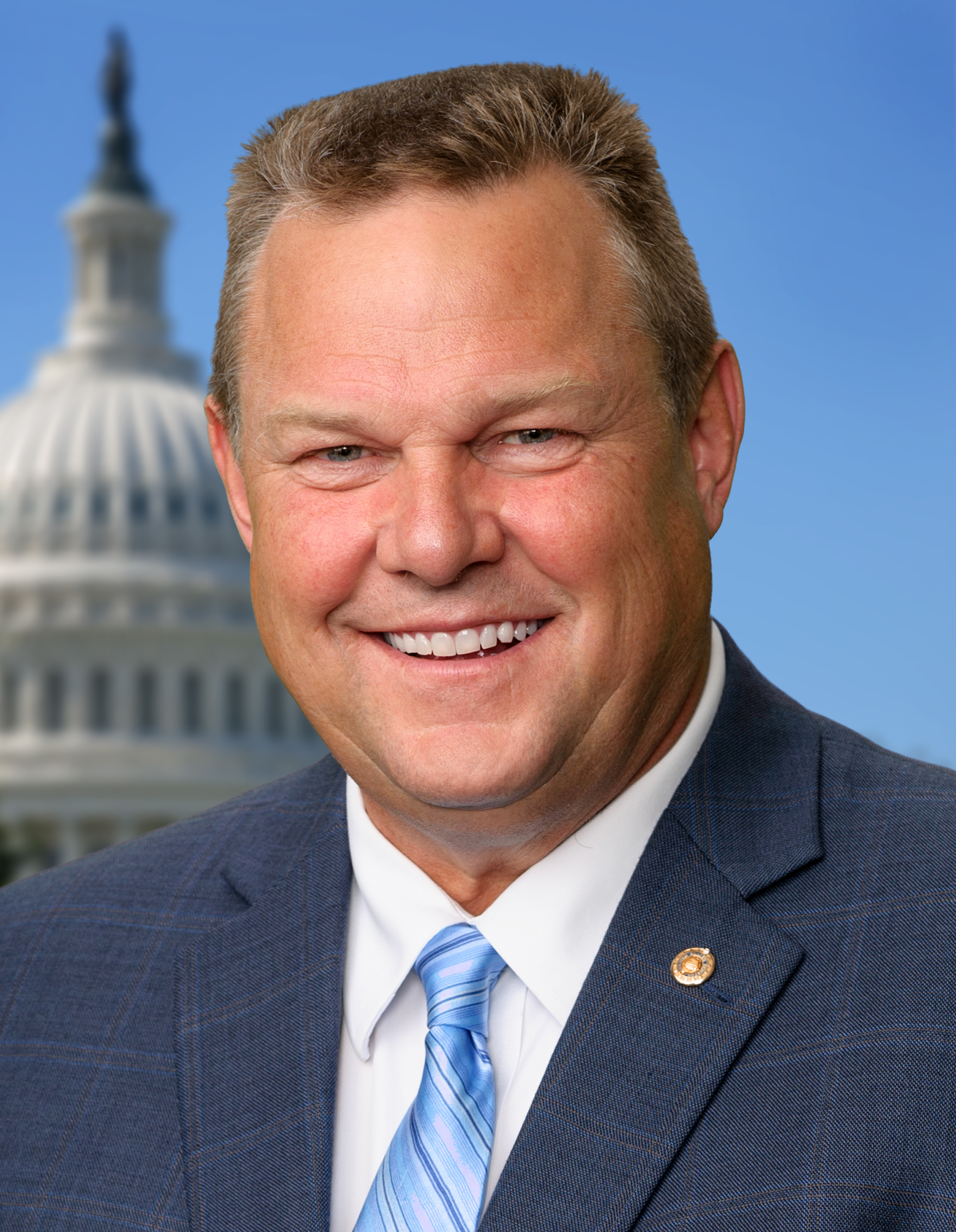

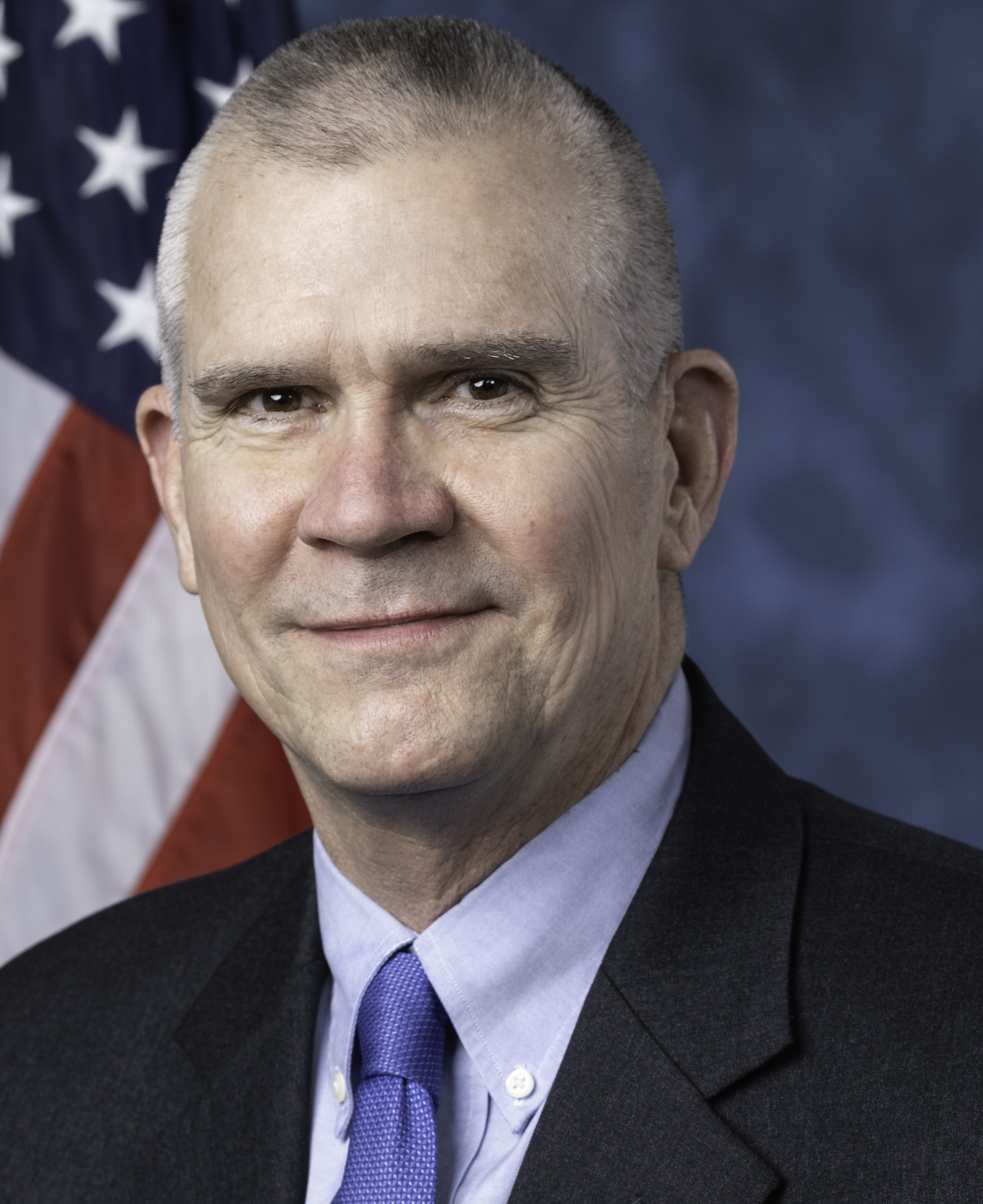
Nominee	Jon Tester	Matt Rosendale
Party	Democratic	Republican
Popular vote	253,876	235,963
Percentage	50.33%	46.78%
- Tester: 40–50% 50–60% 60–70% 70–80% 80–90% >90% Rosendale: 40–50% 50–60% 60–70% 70–80% 80–90% >90% Tie: 50% No data
U.S. senator before election
Jon Tester
Democratic
Elected U.S. Senator
Jon Tester
Democratic

The 2018 United States Senate election in Montana was held on November 6, 2018, to elect a member of the United States Senate to represent the State of Montana, concurrently with other elections to the United States Senate, elections to the United States House of Representatives, and various state and local elections.

This was one of ten Democratic-held Senate seats up for election in a state that Donald Trump won in the 2016 presidential election. Incumbent Democratic Senator Jon Tester was reelected to a third term, defeating Republican State Auditor Matt Rosendale. Rosendale conceded on November 7, 2018. This was the first and only Senate election in which Tester received a majority of votes. This was the last time Democrats won a congressional and/or statewide election in Montana until 2026 when Sam Forstag won the 1st congressional district.

Following his loss, Rosendale went on to run for Montana's vacant congressional seat in 2020 and won, taking office in the U.S. House of Representatives in January 2021.

== Democratic primary ==
=== Candidates ===
==== Nominated ====
- Jon Tester, incumbent U.S. senator

=== Endorsements ===
Jon Tester

U.S. executive branch officials

- Joe Biden, 47th vice president of the United States

U.S. senators

- Dick Durbin, U.S. senator (IL) and Senate Minority Whip
- Al Franken, former U.S. senator (MN)
- Kamala Harris, U.S. senator (CA)
- Amy Klobuchar, U.S. senator (MN)
- Ed Markey, U.S. senator (MA)
- Tom Udall, U.S. senator (NM)
- Elizabeth Warren, U.S. senator (MA)

Local and statewide politicians

- Steve Bullock, governor of Montana

Organizations

- Council for a Livable World
- End Citizens United
- League of Conservation Voters Action Fund
- NARAL Pro-Choice America

=== Results ===
Democratic primary results
Party	Candidate	Votes	%
Democratic	Jon Tester (incumbent)	114,948	100.00%
Total votes		114,948	100.00%

== Republican primary ==
=== Candidates ===
==== Nominated ====
- Matt Rosendale, auditor of Montana and candidate for Congress in 2014

==== Eliminated in primary ====
- Troy Downing, veteran and businessman
- Russell Fagg, former Yellowstone County district judge
- Albert Olszewski, state senator and candidate for lieutenant governor in 2012

==== Withdrew ====
- Ron Murray, businessman and candidate for the state house in 2010

==== Declined ====
- Tim Fox, attorney general of Montana
- Robert J. O'Neill, former Navy SEAL (endorsed Troy Downing)
- Marc Racicot, former governor and former chairman of the Republican National Committee (endorsed Russell Fagg)
- Corey Stapleton, Secretary of State of Montana, candidate for governor in 2012 and candidate for Congress in 2014
- Ryan Zinke, former Secretary of the Interior and former U.S. representative

=== Endorsements ===
Matt Rosendale

U.S. executive branch officials

- Donald Trump

U.S. senators

- Ted Cruz (TX)
- Mike Lee (UT)

Individuals

- Steve Bannon, former White House Chief Strategist and executive chair of Breitbart News

Organizations

- CatholicVote.org
- Citizens United Political Victory Fund
- Club for Growth
- FreedomWorks
- Great America Alliance
- Senate Conservatives Fund

=== Polling ===
Poll source	Date(s) administered	Sample size	Margin of error	Troy Downing	Russell Fagg	Al Olszewski	Matt Rosendale	Other	Undecided
WPA Intelligence (R-Club for Growth)	April 15–16, 2018	503	± 4.4%	12%	17%	8%	40%	–	23%
WPA Intelligence (R-Rosendale)	February 5–7, 2018	401	± 4.4%	12%	11%	5%	28%	1%	–

=== Results ===
Results by county Map legend: Rosendale—60–70%; Rosendale—50–60%; Rosendale—40–50%; Rosendale—30–40%; Rosendale—<30%; Rosendale/Fagg tie—30–40%; Fagg—30–40%; Fagg—40–50%; Fagg—50–60%; Olszewski—30–40%; Olszewski—40–50%

Republican primary results
Party	Candidate	Votes	%
Republican	Matt Rosendale	51,859	33.82%
Republican	Russ Fagg	43,465	28.34%
Republican	Troy Downing	29,341	19.13%
Republican	Al Olszewski	28,681	18.70%
Total votes		153,346	100.00%

== Libertarian primary ==
=== Candidates ===
==== Nominated ====
- Rick Breckenridge, 2016 candidate for the U.S. House of Representatives

In October 2018, Breckenridge told a reporter from the Associated Press that he opposed the use of dark money in politics. Breckenridge said that he realistically anticipated only receiving three or four percent of the vote in the general election, and that he endorsed Rosendale's efforts to stop the use of dark money in politics. The Associated Press interpreted Breckenridge's comments as a statement that Breckenridge was dropping out of the race and endorsing Rosendale. Breckenridge later stated that his use of the word "endorse" referred only to stopping the use of dark money in politics, and said he was still running for the Senate.

== Green Party ==
Kelly won the Green Party nomination, but a Montana district court judge ruled that he had insufficient signatures to get on the ballot.

=== Candidates ===
==== Nominee (removed from ballot) ====
- Steve Kelly, artist and environmental activist

==== Eliminated in primary ====
- Timothy Adams

=== Results ===
Results by county Map legend: Kelly—100%; Kelly—≥90%; Kelly—80–90%; Kelly—70–80%; Kelly—60–70%; Kelly—50–60%; Kelly—40–50%; Kelly/Adams tie—30–40%; Kelly/Adams tie—50%; Adams—50–60%; Adams—60–70%; Adams—100%; No votes

Green primary results
Party	Candidate	Votes	%
Green	Steve Kelly	971	61.22%
Green	Timothy Adams	615	38.78%
Total votes		1,586	100%

== General election ==
=== Debates ===
- Complete video of debate, C-SPAN September 29, 2018
- Complete video of debate, YouTube October 14, 2018

=== Predictions ===
Source	Ranking	As of
The Cook Political Report	Tossup	October 26, 2018
Inside Elections	Tilt D	November 1, 2018
Sabato's Crystal Ball	Lean D	November 5, 2018
Daily Kos	Tossup	November 1, 2018
Fox News	Lean D	November 1, 2018
CNN	Lean D	November 1, 2018
RealClearPolitics	Tossup	November 5, 2018
FiveThirtyEight	Likely D	November 6, 2018

=== Endorsements ===
Jon Tester (D)

U.S. executive branch officials

- Joe Biden, 47th vice president of the United States

U.S. senators

- Dick Durbin, U.S. senator (IL) and Senate Minority Whip
- Al Franken, former U.S. senator (MN)
- Kamala Harris, U.S. senator (CA)
- Amy Klobuchar, U.S. senator (MN)
- Ed Markey, U.S. senator (MA)
- Tom Udall, U.S. senator (NM)
- Elizabeth Warren, U.S. senator (MA)

Newspapers

- Billings Gazette
- Missoulian

Local and statewide politicians

- Steve Bullock, governor of Montana

Organizations

- Communications Workers of America
- Council for a Livable World
- End Citizens United
- Feminist Majority Political Action Committee
- League of Conservation Voters Action Fund
- NARAL Pro-Choice America
- National Committee to Preserve Social Security and Medicare
- National Education Association
- National Wildlife Federation Action Fund
- Population Connection
Matt Rosendale (R)

U.S. executive branch officials

- Mike Pence, 48th vice president of the United States
- Donald Trump, 45th president of the United States

U.S. senators

- Ted Cruz (TX)
- Steve Daines (MT)
- Cory Gardner (CO)
- Mike Lee (UT)
- Rand Paul (KY)

U.S. representatives

- Greg Gianforte (MT-AL)

Individuals

- Steve Bannon, former White House Chief Strategist and executive chair of Breitbart News
- Rick Breckenridge, former Libertarian nominee in this election
- Troy Downing, veteran and 2018 Senate challenger
- Alvin "A.J." Not Afraid, chairman of the Crow Tribe

Organizations

- Americans for Prosperity
- CatholicVote.org
- Citizens United Political Victory Fund
- Club for Growth
- FreedomWorks
- Great America Alliance
- Montana Shooting Sports Association
- National Organization for Marriage
- National Right to Life
- NRA Political Victory Fund
- Senate Conservatives Fund
- Tea Party Express
- U.S. Chamber of Commerce

=== Fundraising ===
Campaign finance reports as of October 17, 2018
Candidate (party)	Total receipts	Total disbursements	Cash on hand
Jon Tester (D)	$19,499,290	$17,946,600	$1,612,530
Matt Rosendale (R)	$5,034,075	$4,515,910	$524,379
Rick Breckenridge (L)	-	-	-
Source: Federal Election Commission

=== Polling ===
View source data.

Poll source	Date(s) administered	Sample size	Margin of error	Jon Tester (D)	Matt Rosendale (R)	Rick Breckenridge (L)	Other	Undecided
The Trafalgar Group (R)	November 2–5, 2018	953	± 3.2%	50%	49%	–	1%	0%
HarrisX	November 1–5, 2018	500	± 4.4%	50%	42%	–	–	–
Change Research	November 2–4, 2018	879	–	46%	49%	3%	–	–
HarrisX	October 31 – November 4, 2018	500	± 4.4%	49%	43%	–	–	–
HarrisX	October 30 – November 3, 2018	500	± 4.4%	49%	43%	–	–	–
HarrisX	October 29 – November 2, 2018	500	± 4.4%	50%	42%	–	–	–
HarrisX	October 28 – November 1, 2018	500	± 4.4%	49%	42%	–	–	–
HarrisX	October 27–31, 2018	500	± 4.4%	49%	42%	–	–	–
HarrisX	October 24–30, 2018	700	± 3.7%	48%	40%	–	–	–
Gravis Marketing	October 24–26, 2018	782	± 3.5%	48%	45%	–	–	7%
University of Montana	October 10–18, 2018	533	± 4.3%	49%	39%	2%	–	10%
Montana State University Billings	October 8–13, 2018	471	± 4.5%	47%	38%	3%	–	12%
Montana State University Bozeman	September 15 – October 6, 2018	2,079	± 2.2%	46%	43%	3%	2%	7%
Public Policy Polling (D-Protect Our Care)	September 28, 2018	594	± 4.0%	49%	45%	–	–	6%
Gravis Marketing	September 19–22, 2018	710	± 3.7%	49%	45%	–	–	6%
Axis Research (R-NRSC)	September 17–19, 2018	–	± 4.5%	44%	44%	4%	–	8%
AARP/Benenson Strategy Group (D)	September 6–16, 2018	950	± 3.1%	50%	43%	–	2%	5%
CBS News/YouGov	September 10–14, 2018	453	–	47%	45%	–	3%	5%
University of Montana	August 13–31, 2018	466	± 4.5%	56%	32%	2%	–	9%
WPA Intelligence (R-NRSC)	August 20–22, 2018	600	± 4.0%	45%	47%	–	–	5%
Remington Research (R)	July 8–10, 2018	2,581	± 2.0%	49%	46%	–	–	5%
SurveyMonkey/Axios	June 11 – July 2, 2018	974	± 5.0%	55%	43%	–	–	3%
Gravis Marketing	June 11–13, 2018	469	± 4.5%	52%	44%	–	–	4%

Hypothetical polling

Poll source	Date(s) administered	Sample size	Margin of error	Jon Tester (D)	Generic Republican	Undecided
SurveyMonkey/Axios	February 12–March 5, 2018	1,484	± 3.4%	42%	55%	3%

=== Results ===
United States Senate election in Montana, 2018
Party	Candidate	Votes	%	±%
Democratic	Jon Tester (incumbent)	253,876	50.33%	+1.75%
Republican	Matt Rosendale	235,963	46.78%	+1.92%
Libertarian	Rick Breckenridge	14,545	2.88%	−3.68%
Total votes		504,384	100.00%	N/A
Democratic hold				

State House district results

State Senate district results

==== By county ====
From Secretary of State of Montana

County	Jon Tester Democratic		Matt Rosendale Republican		Rick Breckenridge Libertarian		Total votes
County	#	%	#	%	#	%	Total votes
Beaverhead	1,876	38.31%	2,866	58.53%	155	3.17%	4,897
Big Horn	3,027	64.73%	1,558	33.32%	91	1.95%	4,676
Blaine	1,961	64.96%	982	32.53%	76	2.52%	3,019
Broadwater	1,071	32.84%	2,086	63.97%	104	3.19%	3,261
Carbon	2,680	44.17%	3,209	52.89%	178	2.93%	6,067
Carter	128	17.02%	602	80.05%	22	2.93%	752
Cascade	17,435	51.27%	15,566	45.77%	1,008	2.96%	34,009
Chouteau	1,275	47.99%	1,312	49.38%	70	2.63%	2,657
Custer	1,942	39.77%	2,762	56.56%	179	3.67%	4,883
Daniels	281	29.86%	631	67.06%	29	3.08%	941
Dawson	1,233	30.27%	2,700	66.29%	140	3.44%	4,073
Deer Lodge	2,892	68.27%	1,208	28.52%	136	3.21%	4,236
Fallon	281	21.80%	951	73.78%	57	4.42%	1,289
Fergus	1,964	33.90%	3,640	62.83%	189	3.26%	5,793
Flathead	19,652	41.15%	26,759	56.03%	1,349	2.82%	47,760
Gallatin	33,251	59.45%	21,248	37.99%	1,434	2.56%	55,933
Garfield	81	11.88%	571	83.72%	30	4.40%	682
Glacier	3,754	75.14%	1,153	23.08%	89	1.78%	4,996
Golden Valley	130	28.63%	303	66.74%	21	4.63%	454
Granite	695	38.76%	1,046	58.34%	52	2.90%	1,793
Hill	3,729	58.36%	2,434	38.09%	227	3.55%	6,390
Jefferson	2,954	43.23%	3,653	53.46%	226	3.31%	6,833
Judith Basin	388	32.58%	752	63.14%	51	4.28%	1,191
Lake	6,916	50.22%	6,491	47.13%	365	2.65%	13,772
Lewis and Clark	20,506	57.70%	14,106	39.69%	927	2.61%	35,539
Liberty	365	37.21%	586	59.73%	30	3.06%	981
Lincoln	2,902	31.08%	6,137	65.73%	298	3.19%	9,337
Madison	1,890	38.11%	2,898	58.44%	171	3.45%	4,959
McCone	227	22.06%	773	75.12%	29	2.82%	1,029
Meagher	319	32.68%	629	64.45%	28	2.87%	976
Mineral	785	38.14%	1,181	57.39%	92	4.47%	2,058
Missoula	41,688	67.62%	18,631	30.22%	1,332	2.16%	61,651
Musselshell	573	23.56%	1,743	71.67%	116	4.77%	2,432
Park	5,114	52.59%	4,357	44.81%	253	2.60%	9,724
Petroleum	58	18.59%	248	79.49%	6	1.92%	312
Phillips	577	27.71%	1,426	68.49%	79	3.79%	2,082
Pondera	1,176	43.80%	1,413	52.63%	96	3.58%	2,685
Powder River	203	20.86%	748	76.88%	22	2.26%	973
Powell	1,026	37.17%	1,641	59.46%	93	3.37%	2,760
Prairie	177	27.11%	450	68.91%	26	3.98%	653
Ravalli	9,156	39.13%	13,622	58.21%	623	2.66%	23,401
Richland	1,136	26.22%	3,017	69.64%	179	4.13%	4,332
Roosevelt	2,013	58.40%	1,346	39.05%	88	2.55%	3,447
Rosebud	1,511	44.88%	1,765	52.42%	91	2.70%	3,367
Sanders	2,071	33.65%	3,856	62.66%	227	3.69%	6,154
Sheridan	712	39.29%	1,017	56.13%	83	4.58%	1,812
Silver Bow	11,672	71.55%	4,246	26.03%	394	2.42%	16,312
Stillwater	1,501	30.86%	3,206	65.91%	157	3.23%	4,864
Sweet Grass	652	31.08%	1,372	65.40%	74	3.53%	2,098
Teton	1,290	40.86%	1,784	56.51%	83	2.63%	3,157
Toole	626	32.90%	1,208	63.48%	69	3.63%	1,903
Treasure	129	31.16%	279	67.39%	6	1.45%	414
Valley	1,545	39.80%	2,137	55.05%	200	5.15%	3,882
Wheatland	315	33.76%	586	62.81%	32	3.43%	933
Wibaux	140	25.83%	390	71.96%	12	2.21%	542
Yellowstone	32,225	46.53%	34,682	50.08%	2,351	3.39%	69,258

Counties that flipped from Democratic to Republican

- Chouteau (largest municipality: Fort Benton)
- Rosebud (largest municipality: Colstrip)
- Yellowstone (largest municipality: Billings)
