= Edwin A. Kenney =

American politician (1843–1920)

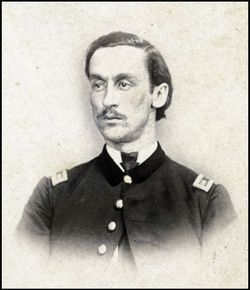

1st Auditor of Montana
- In office 1889–1893
- Governor: Joseph Toole
- Succeeded by: Andrew B. Cook

Personal details
- Born: May 26, 1843; Guilford, Vermont, U.S.
- Died: February 1, 1920 (aged 76); Spokane, Washington, U.S.
- Political party: Republican
- Spouse: Ophelia C. Kenney

Edwin Augustus Kenney (May 26, 1843 – February 1, 1920) was the first Montana State Auditor from 1889-1893.

Kenney was born on May 26, 1843, in Guilford, and died on February 1, 1920, in Spokane.

Party political offices
New office	Republican nominee for Montana Auditor of State; 1989	Succeeded by Andrew B. Cook
Political offices
New office	Montana State Auditor; 1889–1893	Succeeded by Andrew B. Cook
