= Shane Morigeau =

American politician

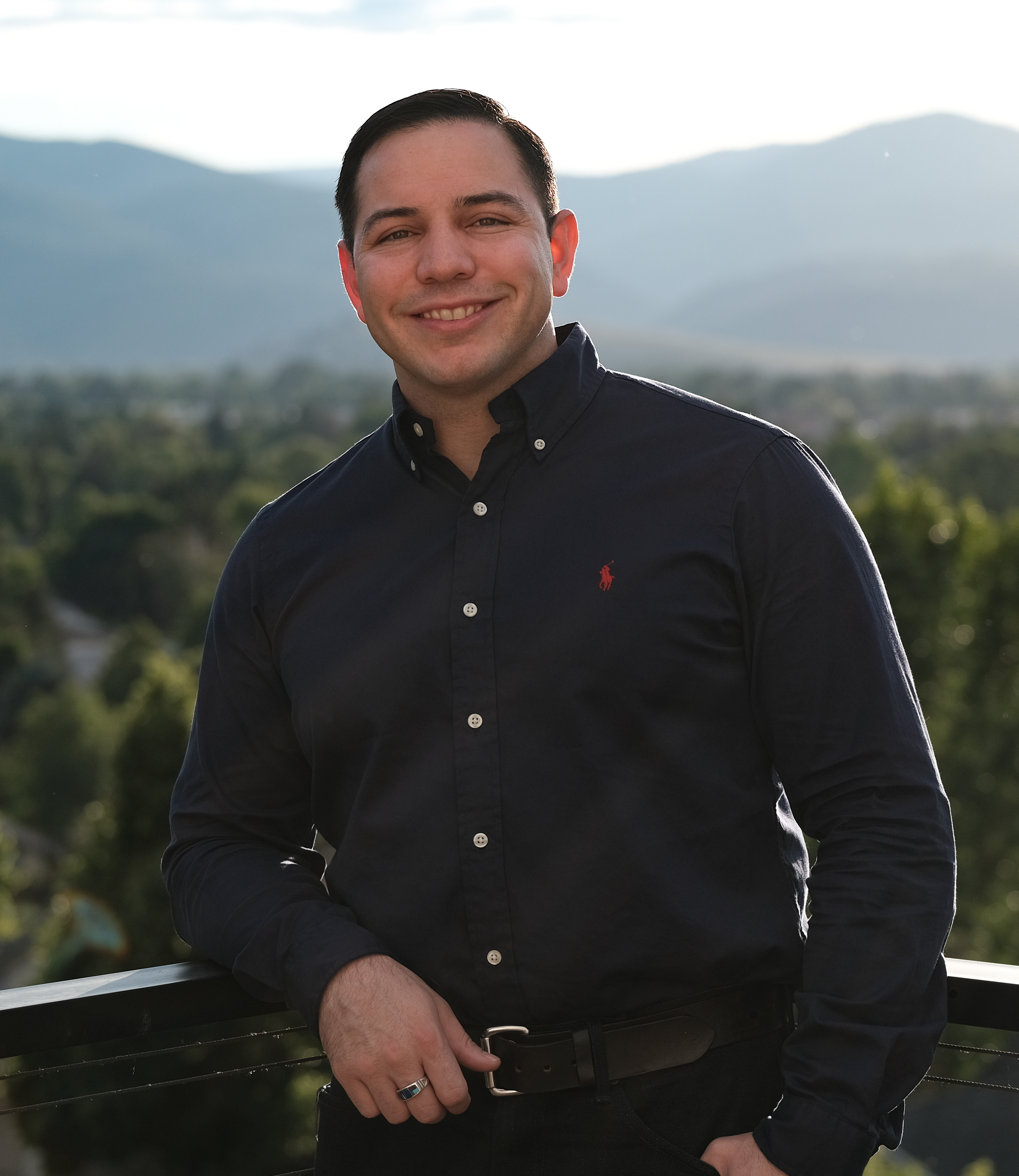

Member of the Montana Senate from the 48th district
- Incumbent
- Assumed office November 17, 2020
- Preceded by: Nate McConnell

Member of the Montana House of Representatives from the 95th district
- In office January 2, 2017 – November 17, 2020
- Preceded by: Nancy Wilson
- Succeeded by: Danny Tenenbaum

Personal details
- Born: Shane Antoine Morigeau; September 8, 1984 (age 41) Missoula, Montana, U.S.
- Party: Democratic
- Relatives: Jacinda Morigeau (cousin)
- Education: University of Montana, Missoula (BS, JD); University of Arizona (LLM)

Shane Morigeau (born September 8, 1984) is an American politician. He grew up in Ronan, Montana, and he is a member of the Confederated Salish and Kootenai Tribes of the Flathead Nation.

== Early life and education ==
He graduated from the Alexander Blewett III School of Law at the University of Montana and the James E. Rogers College of Law at the University of Arizona. He served as a Democratic member of the Montana House of Representatives for District 95 from 2017 until 2021. In 2020, Morigeau won the Democratic party nomination for state auditor, but was defeated in the general election by Republican Troy Downing.

Less than a week after the 2020 general election, incumbent state senator Nate McConnell resigned. McConnell endorsed Morigeau as his successor. Subsequently, Morigeau was formally appointed by the Missoula County Board of Commissioners to serve in the Montana Senate.
