= Alan Doane =

American politician from Montana

Member of the Montana House of Representatives from the 38th into 36th district
- In office January 7, 2013 – January 4, 2021
- Preceded by: Matt Rosendale
- Succeeded by: Bob Phalen

Personal details
- Born: March 3, 1965 (age 61) Glendive, Montana, U.S.
- Party: Republican

Alan Doane (born March 3, 1965) is an American politician. He is a member of the Montana House of Representatives, representing the 38th district from 2013 to 2015, and the 36th District, serving from 2015 to 2021. He is a member of the Republican party.

Doane served as a Majority Whip during the 2015-2016 session.

== Montana State Legislature ==
=== 2010 Montana House of Representatives election ===
Montana's 38th District House of Representatives Primary Election, 2010
Party	Candidate	Votes	%
Republican	Matt Rosendale	901	48.36
Republican	Alan Doane	769	41.28
Republican	Edward Hilbert	193	10.36
Total votes		1,863	100

=== 2012 Montana House of Representatives election ===
Montana's 38th District House of Representatives Primary Election, 2012
Party	Candidate	Votes	%
Republican	Alan Doane	861	51.84
Republican	Edward Hilbert	800	48.16
Total votes		1,661	100

Montana's 38th District House of Representatives General Election, 2012
Party	Candidate	Votes	%
Republican	Alan Doane	2,461	57.13
Democratic	Jim Hicks	1,847	42.87
Total votes		4,308	100

=== 2014 Montana House of Representatives election ===
Doane was uncontested in the primary election, having received 2,034 votes.

Montana's 36th House of Representatives General Election, 2014
Party	Candidate	Votes	%
Republican	Alan Doane	2,668	71.97
Democratic	Edward Hansen	1,039	28.03
Total votes		3,707	100

=== 2016 Montana House of Representatives election ===
Montana's 36th District House of Representatives Primary Election, 2016
Party	Candidate	Votes	%
Republican	Alan Doane	1,528	59.16
Republican	Edward Hilbert	1,055	40.84
Total votes		2,583	100

Montana's 36th District House of Representatives General Election, 2016
Party	Candidate	Votes	%
Republican	Alan Doane	3,730	76.01
Democratic	Mike Ruddy	1,177	23.99
Total votes		4,907	100

=== 2018 Montana House of Representatives election ===
Doane was uncontested in the primary election, having received 2,100 votes.

Doane was also uncontested in the general election, having received 3,765 votes.
