= Troy Downing =

American politician and businessman (born 1967)

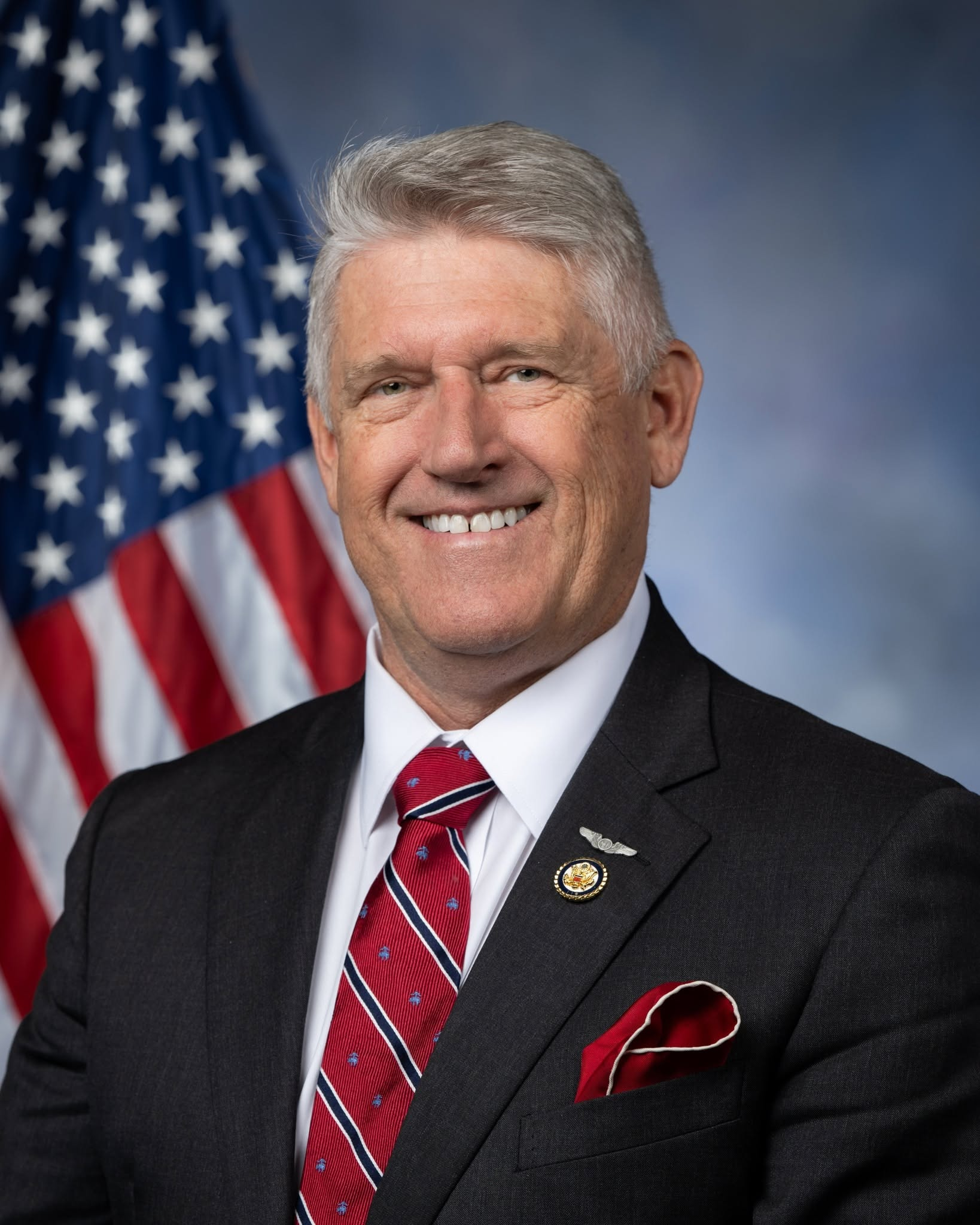
- Official portrait, 2025

Member of the U.S. House of Representatives from Montana's 2nd district
- Incumbent
- Assumed office January 3, 2025
- Preceded by: Matt Rosendale

17th Auditor of Montana
- In office January 4, 2021 – January 3, 2025
- Governor: Greg Gianforte
- Preceded by: Matt Rosendale
- Succeeded by: James Brown

Personal details
- Born: Troy Bryan Downing; March 4, 1967 (age 59) Indio, California, U.S.
- Party: Republican
- Spouse: Heather Downing
- Children: 4
- Education: New York University (attended)
- Website: House website Campaign website

Military service
- Branch/service: United States Air Force
- Unit: 129th Rescue Squadron
- Battles/wars: War in Afghanistan

Troy Bryan Downing (born March 4, 1967) is an American politician and businessman serving as a member of the U.S. House of Representatives for Montana's 2nd congressional district since 2025. A member of the Republican Party, he previously held the office of Montana state auditor from 2021 to 2025.

Downing ran for the United States Senate in 2018, but placed third in the Republican primary, behind then-state auditor Matt Rosendale and Yellowstone County District Judge Russell Fagg. In 2020, Downing ran for State Auditor of Montana to succeed Rosendale, who was running for the House of Representatives. He won the Republican nomination, defeating 2 other candidates, and defeated Democrat Shane Morigeau in the general election. In 2024, instead of running for a second term, Downing instead ran for the House of Representatives, also to succeed Rosendale, who retired after 2 terms. He won the Republican nomination and defeated former state house speaker John Driscoll. He will become the co-dean of Montana's congressional delegation in 2027 alongside Tim Sheehy.

== Early life and education ==
Downing was born in Indio, California. He studied applied mathematics and computer science at New York University.

== Career ==
Downing was a research scientist and educator at the Courant Institute of Mathematical Sciences at New York University. After leaving college, Downing founded WebCal, a web calendar company that was later acquired by Yahoo!. Downing later founded a nationwide commercial insurance company and a real estate firm. He enlisted in the United States Air Force after the September 11 attacks and was assigned to a combat search and rescue squadron. During his service, Downing worked as a flight engineer and was deployed to Afghanistan twice. He is the founder and former CEO of AC Self Storage Solutions, a self-storage and real estate investment firm based in Carlsbad, California.

Downing is the co-owner of Wildrye Distilling in Bozeman, Montana, which manufactured thousands of gallons of hand sanitizer during the height of the COVID-19 pandemic in Montana.

Downing was a candidate in the 2018 United States Senate election in Montana, placing third in the Republican primary.

=== Montana state auditor ===
During the 2020 election, Troy Downing defeated Scott Tuxbury and Nelly Nicol in the Republican primary for Montana state auditor. On June 2, 2020, Downing became the Republican nominee, winning 55 of 56 counties and receiving 50% of the vote in the three-way primary.

In the general election, Downing defeated state Senator Shane Morigeau. He was sworn in as state auditor on January 4, 2021.

== U.S. House of Representatives ==
=== Elections ===
==== 2024 ====
In the June 4, 2024 primary, Downing won the eight-way contest to secure the Republican nomination for eastern Montana's 2nd congressional district. He won the general election on November 5, 2024, defeating Democratic nominee John Driscoll.

=== Tenure ===
Rep. Downing was sworn in to the 119th United States Congress on January 3, 2025.

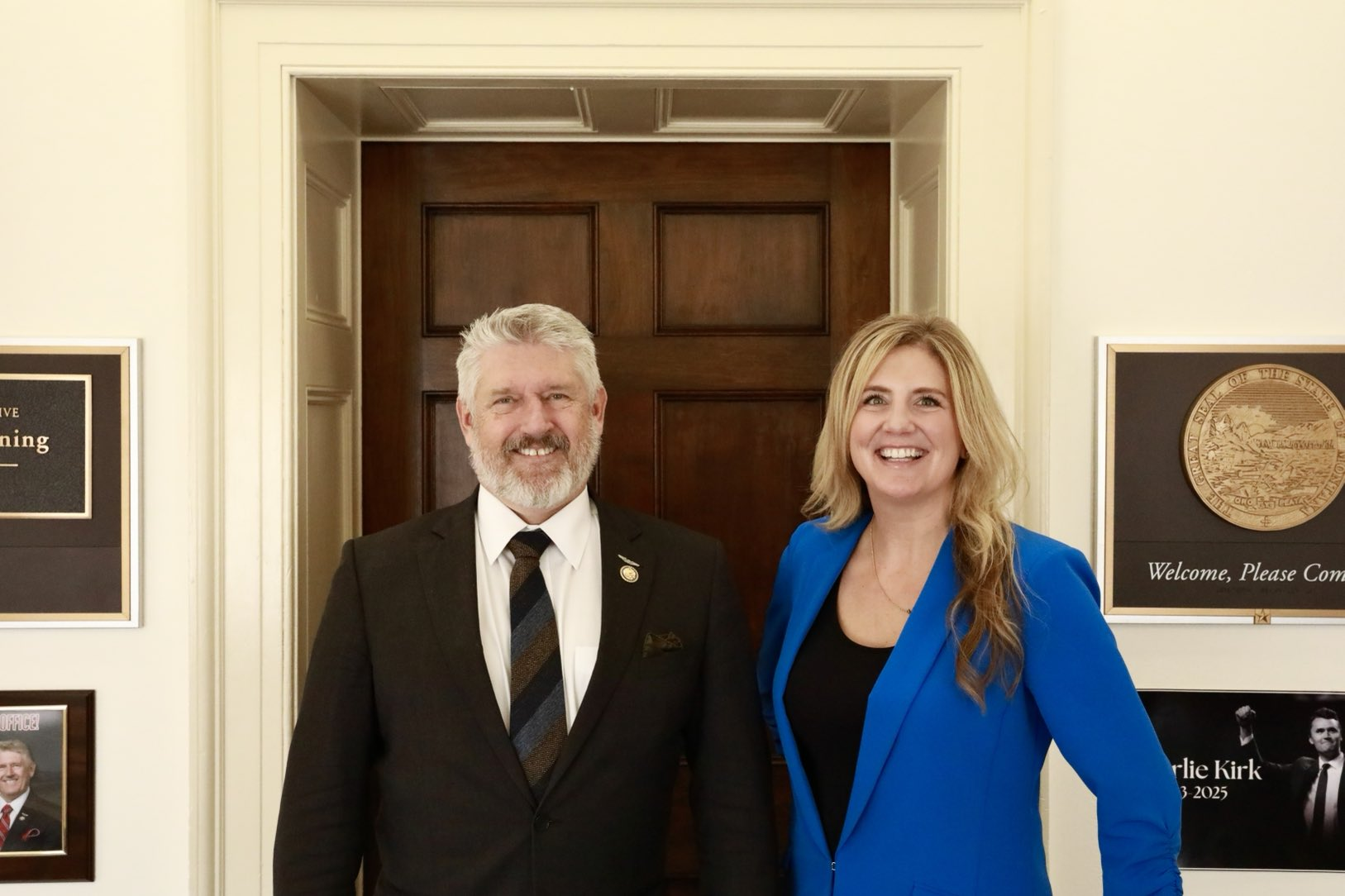
Downing with Superintendent Susie Hedalen in Washington, D.C., March 2026

=== Committee assignments ===
- Committee on Financial Services
  - Subcommittee on Capital Markets
  - Subcommittee on Digital Assets, Financial Technology, and Artificial Intelligence
  - Subcommittee on Housing and Insurance
- Committee on Small Business
  - Subcommittee on Innovation, Entrepreneurship, and Workforce Development
  - Subcommittee on Oversight, Investigations, and Regulations

=== Caucus memberships ===
- Congressional Western Caucus
- Republican Study Committee

== Personal life ==
Downing is a volunteer for the Warriors and Quiet Waters (WQW) Foundation.

Downing and his wife, Heather, have four children.

Downing built a vacation home in Big Sky, Montana, in 2000 and moved there full-time in 2009.

In 2017, Downing was charged with hunting license violations. He ultimately pled guilty to two misdemeanor charges, being ordered to pay a $2,110 fine and any court fees.

Party political offices
| Preceded by Matt Rosendale | Republican nominee for Auditor of Montana; 2020 | Succeeded by James Brown |
Political offices
| Preceded by Matt Rosendale | Auditor of Montana; 2021–2025 | Succeeded by James Brown |
U.S. House of Representatives
| Preceded by Matt Rosendale | Member of the U.S. House of Representatives from Montana's 2nd congressional district 2025–present | Incumbent |
U.S. order of precedence (ceremonial)
| Preceded by Maxine Dexter | United States representatives by seniority 375th | Succeeded by Sarah Elfreth |
