= Recreation resource planning =

Type of civic planning

Recreation resource planning is a rational systematic decision-making process about the future management of recreation resources and recreation opportunities. Recreation planning applies analytical tools to deter our human tendencies to make decisions based on predisposition, bias, inadequate analysis, group-think, insular perspective, resistance to change, and excessive self-confidence. It results in decisions that are more effective, efficient, fair, reasoned, and defensible.

== General precepts ==
=== Recreation Resource Planners ===
Recreation resource planners are professionals and should have a university degree in recreation resource planning, urban or regional planning, landscape architecture, or a closely related field. Professional experience and professional certification (e.g., NRPA, AICP) may also fulfill this educational standard.

=== Sound Professional Judgment ===
The standard for decision making in recreation planning is sound professional judgment, defined as a reasonable decision that has given full and fair consideration to all of the appropriate information, that is based on principled and reasoned analysis and the best available science and expertise, and that complies with applicable laws.

=== A Contract with the Recreating Public ===
A recreation plan is a contract with the recreating public and affected stakeholders that transcends any one person or administration, and as such should be detailed, unambiguous, and provide for accountability.

=== Represent the Public Interest ===
Recreation resource planning is a collaborative public process that deters the bias of special interests, political intervention, or incremental unplanned decision making.

=== Recreation Resources ===
Recreation resources are those features in a setting that define a person’s experience, such as the natural and cultural resources, special values attached to an area, facilities, infrastructure, personnel, and management regulations and actions.

=== Recreation Opportunities ===
Recreation planners plan for recreation opportunities, defined as an occasion for a person to participate in a specific recreation activity in a particular outdoor setting in order to enjoy a desired recreation experience and gain the health benefits that accrue.

=== Recreation ===
The occasion for a person to participate in a specific recreation activity in a particular outdoor setting in order to enjoy a desired recreation experience and gain the healthy benefits that accrue. (Note---the historic term of “recreation” has largely been replaced by the phrase “recreation opportunity” as defined above).

=== Recreation Benefits ===
Recreation resource planning should promote the environmental, human and community wellness benefits that accrue from recreation participation such as improved physical and mental health, family cohesion, civility, social integration, child development, economic stimulation, workforce productivity, resource stewardship, and conservation ethic.

=== Recreation Diversity ===
Because there is no “average” recreationist, plan for spectrum of diverse recreation opportunities.

=== Systems Approach ===
Recreation resource planners must consider how their resources fit into a larger regional system, how their potential recreation alternatives might contribute to regional recreation diversity, and how their opportunities can be linked to larger systems.

=== Recreation Justice ===
Recreation resource planning helps to ensure that all people have an opportunity to enjoy our great outdoors without prejudice of race, ethnicity, age, wealth, gender, beliefs, or abilities. Planning should also ensure that Treaty rights and the rights of aboriginal peoples are fairly considered.

=== Recreation Allocation ===
Recreation resource planning requires recreation allocation decisions because not all types and numbers of people or activities can be accommodated in a particular setting at one time.

=== Recreation Compatibility ===
Some recreation uses are not compatible with other uses, and recreation planners have the responsibility to determine what, if any, uses should be permitted, and where those activities should be permitted. Strong preferences for specific recreation settings lead to competition for recreation resources among different user types. Conflict is also generated by how each user group perceives the others’ actions and values.

=== Recreation Niche ===
Because not all people can be accommodated in all places, recreation planning helps to focus on the special values and resources of a setting and to define the special niche within the larger spectrum of recreation opportunities.

=== Visitor Capacity ===
Visitor capacity is the prescribed number, or supply, of available visitor opportunities that will be accommodated in a specific location and specific time.

=== Resource Sustainability ===
Whereas natural and cultural resources define an outdoor recreation setting, it is fundamental that recreation resource planning and plans address how to integrate recreation use so as to harmonize with, protect, enhance, and sustain these important resources.

=== Reduction of Impact ===
Recreation planning should proactively consider ways to minimize and mitigate potential social and environmental impacts.

=== Recreation Stewardship ===
Recreation planning should consider how to best design, manage, and interpret settings so as to foster public appreciation, understanding, respect, behaviors, and partnerships that contribute to the stewardship of an area’s natural and cultural resources, and special values.

=== Resource Caretakers ===
Recreation planners also have a responsibility to consider how plans and decisions will affect the kind of resource legacy will be left to the next generation.

== Principles for the planning process ==
=== A Process ===
While the specific terms and steps in a recreation planning process often vary across institutions, all recreation resource planning in some manner includes:

Identification of public issues, management concerns, opportunities, and threats through collaborative stakeholder involvement.

Establishment of planning and decision criteria for evaluating and selecting the preferred alternative.

Inventory of resources, the current situation, and the best available science and information.

Formulation of alternatives which address the significant issues and concerns.

Evaluation of the consequences, benefits, and effects of each proposed alternative.

Selection of a preferred alternative based upon a full and reasoned analysis.

Implementation and monitoring.

Plan adaptation or revision.

=== Legally Sufficient ===
Recreation resource planning is framed by various local, state, and federal laws and regulations, with the most significant and historic direction provided by the National Environmental Policy Act (1969) and its attendant Council on Environmental Quality regulations.

=== Judicial Doctrine ===
Good recreation planning is based upon the important judicial principles of being principled, reasoned, reasonable, sufficient, full, fair, and preponderance of the information.

=== Planning Considerations ===
An adequate recreation resource planning process and plan must address all of the significant public issues, management concerns, opportunities, and threats that are identified in the early stages of the planning process. Issues, concerns, opportunities and threats that are not deemed significant, do not need to be addressed in the plan.

=== Planning Inputs ===
Recreation resource planning requires the consideration of many inputs such as an inventory of existing plans and policies, current type and amount of recreation use (supply and demand), recreation trends, public issues, management concerns, regional supply of recreation opportunities, visitor and stakeholder preferences, economic impact of recreation participation, best available science, environmental conditions, and available information from recreation and resource monitoring.

=== Recreation Resource Publics ===
Recreation resource planning must engage with and hear from members of the public who value the recreation resource. Members of the public can be visitors, local business owners, land owners and communities, but there may also be equally important members of the public who do not use the resource, but equally share in the ownership of the public resource.

=== Collaboration ===
The meaningful engagement and exchange with the public is essential throughout the planning process. Collaboration results in a clearer definition of public values, more creative alternatives, more reasoned and reasonable decisions, and a constituency that becomes better informed and committed to the plan and its implementation.

=== Science-Informed Planning ===
It is both a legal requirement and professional imperative to duly consider the best available science and expertise in the planning process and the plan’s implementation.

=== Comprehensive and Integrated ===
Recreation planning should consider other significant natural and cultural resources, uses, demands, and values in an integrated and comprehensive fashion. Functional planning, whereby one resource is planned for in a vacuum from other resources, is not appropriate and contrary to comprehensive and integrated planning.

=== Clear Management Alternatives ===
Recreation alternatives must be clear, comprehensive, and provide a reasonable range of choices for public consideration. Each alternative can be contrasted by its proposed objectives, desired future conditions, desired recreation experiences, facilities, management strategies and actions, quality standards, visitor capacities, economic value, projected budget requirements, and monitoring program.

=== Rigorous Analysis ===
The analytical stage in a planning process is the evaluation of alternatives whereby the alternatives should be sharply contrasted, and the pros and cons are rigorously evaluated so the reasons for and against each alternative become clear.

== Principles for the plan ==
=== The Document ===
The effectiveness and utility of a plan is in part a function of its clarity, brevity, layout, and design. Materials used in the planning process should be retained in the administrative record, but the final approved document should be a valuable desktop working document.

=== Resource Management Prescription ===
The output of a recreation resource planning process is a management prescription for an area that includes such information as goals, objectives, desired future conditions, desired recreation experiences, facilities, management strategies and actions, quality standards, visitor capacities, a monitoring program, and budgetary needs.

=== Budgetary Tool ===
An effective recreation plan should include the projected budgetary needs to implement the plan. In this way the plan is a tool to prepare and justify annual budgets, for allocating budgets, and to guide annual work priorities, and facilitate the scheduling and sequencing of projects.

== Principles for implementation ==
=== Implementing Partnerships ===
The successful implementation of a plan should involve collaboration with stakeholders, government agencies, partnerships, and alliances with communities, special interest groups, and the private sector.

=== Institutional Accountability ===
The responsible official charged with implementing the plan should periodically evaluate and report to the public on progress and accomplishments to date, factors affecting the plan’s implementation, and changes pending or made to the approved plan.

=== Plan Adaptability ===
A recreation resource plan should be adaptive to new science, information, uses, technology, trends, conditions, and other circumstances of importance. Any proposed change should be subject to the same level of deliberate analysis and public collaboration as went into the original decision.

=== Review and Revision ===
Given the significant and ongoing changes in our society and the recreation industry, it would be reasonable that recreation plans be formally reviewed and updated every 5–10 years.

These principles were developed by the Board of Directors of the National Association of Recreation Resource Planners, with input solicited from more than 1000 recreation planning professionals, and approved by the Board for distribution in April 2009.

== See also ==
- Wildlife management
- Landscape planning
