= Carolyn Squires =

American politician

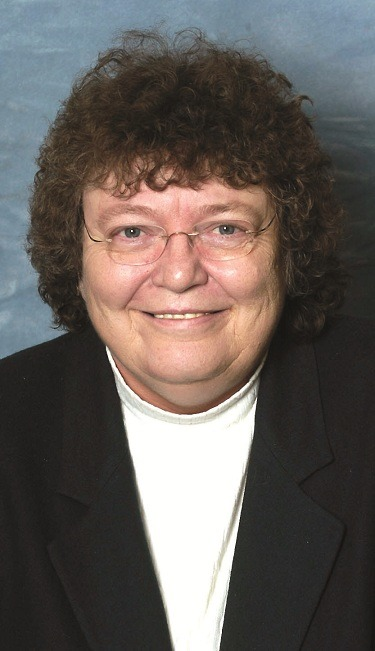

Member of the Montana House of Representatives from the 96th district
- In office January 3, 2011 – January 5, 2015
- Preceded by: Teresa Henry
- Succeeded by: Andrew Person

Member of the Montana Senate from the 48th district
- In office January 3, 2007 – January 3, 2011
- Succeeded by: Tom Facey

Member of the Montana Senate from the 34th district
- In office January 6, 2003 – January 3, 2007

Member of the Montana House of Representatives from the 68th district
- In office January 2, 1995 – January 3, 2001

Member of the Montana House of Representatives from the 58th district
- In office January 7, 1991 – January 2, 1995

Personal details
- Born: September 25, 1940 Whitefish, Montana
- Died: March 21, 2016 (aged 75) Missoula, Montana
- Party: Democratic Party
- Spouse: Harold D.
- Education: Missoula College University of Montana; Everett Community College
- Occupation: Licensed practical nurse

Carolyn M. Squires (September 25, 1940 – March 21, 2016) was an American nurse and politician.

== Background ==
Born in Whitefish, Montana, Squires grew up in Everett, Washington and went to Catholic schools. Squires received her associate degree in arts and science from Everett Community College. She then returned to Montana and went to the Missoula Vocational Technical Center and received her LPN license in 1967. Squires served as a nurse in hospitals in Missoula, Montana. Squires was involved with the AFL–CIO helping displaced union members with retraining. Squires died at her home in Missoula, Montana.

== Political career ==
Squires served as a Democratic member of the Montana House of Representatives for the 96th district from 2010 to 2015. From 2002 to 2010, she was a member of the Montana Senate, representing District 48, where she served as Majority Whip. Earlier she was a member of the Montana House of Representatives from 1987 through 2000.
