= Matt Rosendale =

American politician (born 1960)

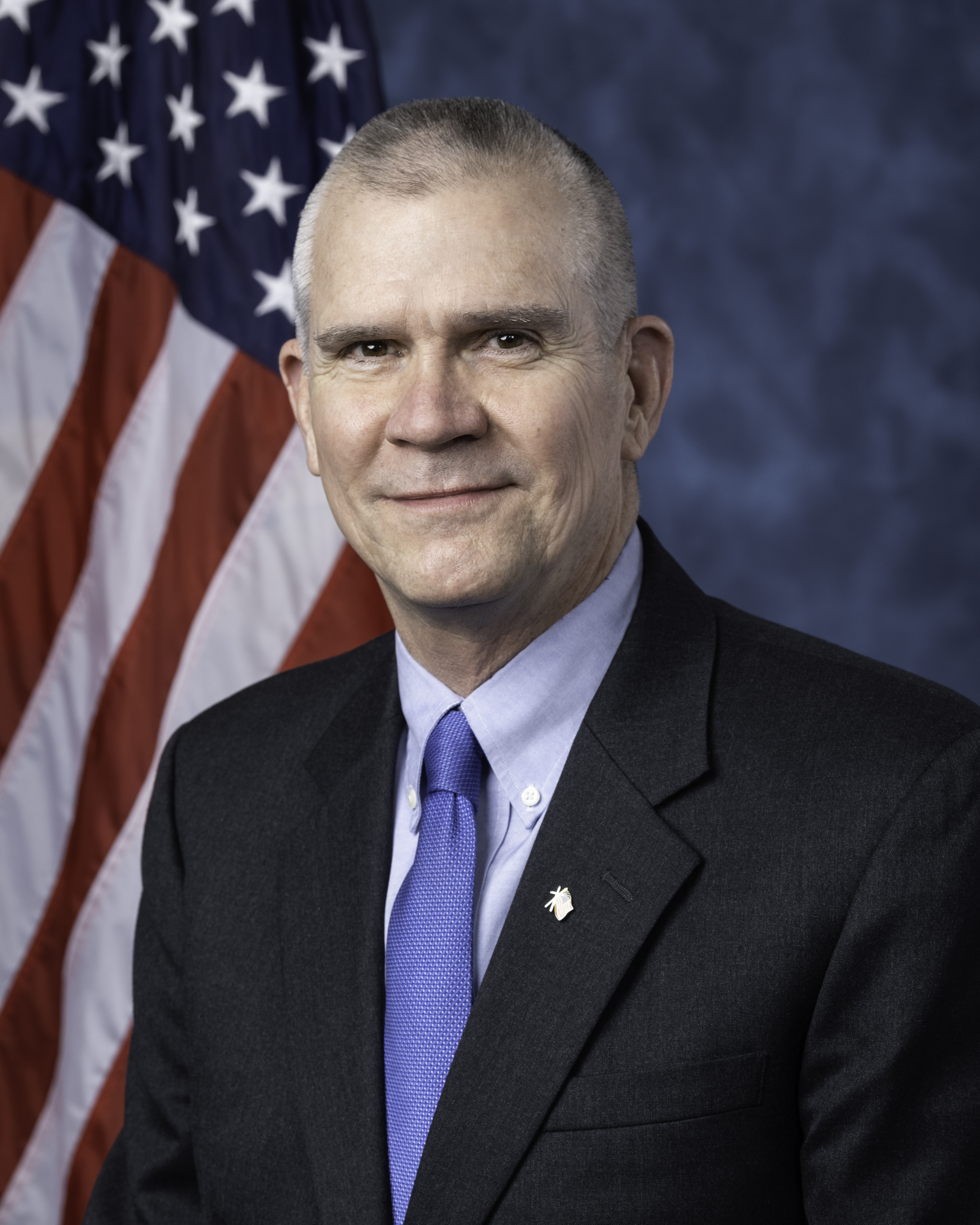
- Official portrait, 2021

Member of the U.S. House of Representatives from Montana
- In office January 3, 2021 – January 3, 2025
- Preceded by: Greg Gianforte
- Succeeded by: Troy Downing
- Constituency: At-large district (2021–2023); 2nd district (2023–2025)

16th Auditor of Montana
- In office January 2, 2017 – January 3, 2021
- Governor: Steve Bullock
- Preceded by: Monica Lindeen
- Succeeded by: Troy Downing

Member of the Montana Senate from the 18th district
- In office January 7, 2013 – January 2, 2017
- Preceded by: John Brenden
- Succeeded by: Steve Hinebauch

Member of the Montana House of Representatives from the 38th district
- In office January 3, 2011 – January 7, 2013
- Preceded by: Dennis Getz
- Succeeded by: Alan Doane

Personal details
- Born: Matthew Martin Rosendale Sr. July 7, 1960 (age 66) Baltimore, Maryland, U.S.
- Party: Republican
- Spouse: Jean Rosendale (m. 1985)
- Children: 3, including Adam
- Education: Chesapeake College (attended)
- Website: House website
- Rosendale's voice Rosendale supporting the PACT Act. Recorded July 13, 2022

Matthew Martin Rosendale Sr. (born July 7, 1960) is an American politician and former real estate developer who represented Montana in the United States House of Representatives from 2021 to 2025. A member of the Republican Party, Rosendale served in the Montana House of Representatives from 2011 to 2013, and in the Montana Senate from 2013 to 2017. From 2015 to 2017, he served as Montana Senate majority leader. Rosendale was elected Montana state auditor in 2016 and held that position from 2017 to 2020. Rosendale ran unsuccessfully for the U.S. House of Representatives in 2014 and for the U.S. Senate in 2018. He was elected to represent Montana's at-large congressional district in 2020. After Montana regained its second House seat in the 2020 census, Rosendale was elected to represent its new 2nd congressional district in 2022.

On February 9, 2024, Rosendale announced his candidacy for the 2024 U.S. Senate race, looking to challenge Jon Tester again. Six days later, Rosendale withdrew from the race after Donald Trump endorsed his opponent, Tim Sheehy, in the Republican primary. Rosendale chose to run for re-election to his House seat, but withdrew from that race as well in March 2024.

== Early life and early career ==
Rosendale was born on July 7, 1960, in Baltimore, Maryland. He graduated from Queen Anne's County High School in Centreville, Maryland, in 1978. Rosendale attended Chesapeake College in Maryland but did not graduate. He was one of three sitting Representatives who hasn't attended college, the other two being Lauren Boebert and Mike Bost.

Rosendale worked in Maryland in the fields of real estate development and land management before moving with his family to Glendive, Montana, in 2002. In Montana, he was twice elected chairman of the Glendive Agri-Trade Expo committee, a local group that puts on an agriculture exposition showcasing agri-business in eastern Montana.

== Political career ==
=== Montana House of Representatives ===
Rosendale served one two-year term in the Montana House of Representatives.

Rosendale announced he would run for the Montana House of Representatives to represent House District 38, which covers Wibaux County and part of Dawson County. Also seeking the Republican nomination were Edward Hilbert and Alan Doane. Rosendale prevailed, receiving 48.4% of the vote to Doane's 41.3% and Hilbert's 10.4%.

Rosendale defeated Democratic incumbent State Representative Dennis Getz in the general election, with 52.7% of the vote to Getz's 47.3%.

During the 2011 legislative session, Rosendale served on several committees, including the Business and Labor Committee, the Transportation Committee, and the Local Government Committee.

=== Montana Senate ===
Rosendale served one four-year term in the Montana Senate from 2013 to 2017. From 2015 to 2017, he served as majority leader.

In 2012, with state senator Donald Steinbeisser ineligible for reelection due to term limits, Rosendale announced he would run for the Montana Senate to represent Senate District 19, a heavily Republican district in eastern Montana.

After running unopposed in the Republican primary, Rosendale defeated Democratic nominee Fred Lake in the general election, with 67.6% of the vote to Lake's 32.4%.

During the 2013 legislative session, Rosendale served as vice chair of the Natural Resources and Transportation Committee. He also served on the Finance and Claims Committee, the Highways and Transportation Committee and the Natural Resources Committee. During this legislative session, Rosendale was the primary sponsor of a resolution urging Congress to submit a balanced budget amendment to states. He also was the primary sponsor of a bill that became law to prevent law enforcement from using drones for surveillance purposes.

Due to state redistricting in 2014, Rosendale represented Senate District 18 for the rest of his tenure, starting in 2015. At the beginning of the 2015 legislative session, Rosendale's colleagues in the State Senate elected him to serve as majority leader. He also chaired the Rules Committee and was a member of the Finance and Claims Committee and Natural Resources and Transportation Committee. Rosendale was the primary sponsor of a bill to authorize direct primary care provider plans that passed the legislature before being vetoed by Governor Steve Bullock.

=== Montana State Auditor ===
==== Elections ====
Rosendale ran for Montana State Auditor in 2016, when incumbent Monica Lindeen was ineligible for reelection due to term limits.

Rosendale ran unopposed in the Republican primary. In the general election, he faced Jesse Laslovich, who was Lindeen's chief legal counsel and widely considered one of Montana's rising political stars.

Rosendale defeated Laslovich with 53.6% of the vote to Laslovich's 46.4%. At the time, this was the most expensive state auditor's race in Montana state history.

==== Tenure ====
Rosendale served as Montana state auditor from 2017 to 2020. As state auditor, Rosendale approved direct primary care agreements and authorized Medi-Share to operate in Montana. Medi-Share, a health care sharing ministry which asks members of a religious faith to pool money together to cover their health care costs, had previously been banned from operating in Montana after the company refused to cover a member's medical bills. In authorizing Medi-Share to operate in Montana, Rosendale determined that the company did not qualify as an insurer and had no obligation to pay subscribers' bills.

Rosendale refused to accept a pay raise, taking an annual salary of $92,236.

As state auditor, Rosendale was also one of five members of the Montana State Land Board, which oversees the 5.2 million acres in the state trust land. As a member of the Montana State Land Board, Rosendale voted to expand access to over 45,000 acres (18,000 ha) of public land.

In 2017, Rosendale proposed legislation that would create a reinsurance program so that individuals with preexisting conditions could access affordable health coverage. This legislation passed both houses of the legislature before being vetoed by Governor Steve Bullock. Rosendale condemned Bullock's veto, saying, "the governor has sacrificed good, bipartisan policy in favor of bad, partisan politics." Rosendale then worked with a bipartisan group of Montana officials to create a reinsurance program and were granted a waiver to do so by the federal government. The program is now operational.

In 2019, Rosendale proposed legislation targeting pharmacy benefits managers and a practice known as spread pricing. The legislation passed both houses of the legislature before being vetoed by Bullock, who wrote in his veto message that the bill would cause drug prices to increase. Rosendale again condemned Bullock, saying his veto "is a gift to the pharmaceutical and insurance industries and it's a slap in the face to consumers."

=== U.S. House of Representatives ===
==== 2014 election ====
In 2013, incumbent representative Steve Daines announced that he would not seek reelection and would instead run for the United States Senate. Rosendale then announced his candidacy to succeed Daines in the U.S. House of Representatives. In addition to Rosendale, the Republican field included former state senators Ryan Zinke and Corey Stapleton, state representative Elsie Arntzen, and real estate investor Drew Turiano.

Rosendale came in third place with 28.8% of the vote, behind Zinke's 33.3% and Stapleton's 29.3%. Arntzen and Turiano received 6.9% and 1.7%, respectively.

==== 2020 election ====
In June 2019, Representative Greg Gianforte announced that he would not seek reelection and would instead run for governor to replace term-limited governor Steve Bullock. Days later, Rosendale announced he would run for the open seat.

Rosendale received the early endorsement of President Donald Trump. He also received early endorsements from elected officials around the country, including Senator Ted Cruz, Senator Rand Paul, House Republican Leader Kevin McCarthy, House Republican Whip Steve Scalise and Representative Jim Jordan, as well as the endorsement of the Crow Tribe of Montana. He won the six-way Republican primary with 48.3% of the vote, carrying every county.

Rosendale defeated Democratic nominee Kathleen Williams in the general election in November, with 56.4% of the vote to her 43.6%.

==== 2022 election ====
As a result of the 2020 census and redistricting cycle, Montana regained a congressional district having had a single at-large district since 1993. Rosendale ran for reelection in the reconstituted second district, which covers the eastern two-thirds of the state and includes Billings, Great Falls, and Helena.

Rosendale again received Trump's endorsement and won the 2022 Republican primary in the second district. He won the general election with 56.6% of the vote to Independent Gary Buchanan's 22.0% and Democrat Penny Ronning's 20.1%.

==== Tenure ====
Rosendale was sworn into the House of Representatives on January 3, 2021.

Along with all other Senate and House Republicans, Rosendale voted against the American Rescue Plan Act of 2021.

In July 2021, Rosendale voted against the bipartisan ALLIES Act, which would increase by 8,000 the number of special immigrant visas for Afghan allies of the U.S. military during its invasion of Afghanistan, while also reducing some application requirements that caused long application backlogs; the bill passed in the House 407–16.

Rosendale supported a ban on members of Congress trading stocks.

In June 2021, Rosendale was one of 49 House Republicans to vote to repeal the AUMF against Iraq.

Rosendale issued a statement opposing intervention in Ukraine during the prelude to the Russian invasion. Later, he sponsored the Secure America's Border First Act, which would prohibit the expenditure or obligation of military and security assistance to Kyiv over the U.S. border with Mexico.

On March 2, 2022, Rosendale was one of only three House members to vote against a resolution supporting the sovereignty of Ukraine in the face of the Russian invasion.

In 2022, Rosendale voted against a bill that would provide approximately $14 billion to the government of Ukraine.

In July 2022, Rosendale was one of 18 Republicans to vote against ratifying Sweden's and Finland's applications for NATO membership.

In March 2023, Rosendale was among 47 Republicans to vote in favor of H.Con.Res. 21 which directed President Joe Biden to remove U.S. troops from Syria within 180 days.

On March 1, 2023, Rosendale posed for a photo in front of the United States Capitol with a former member of a white supremacist gang and a Nazi sympathizer. Rosendale later affirmed his opposition to hate groups and stated that he did not know the two individuals or their affiliations when he was photographed with them.

On October 3, 2023, Florida Republican Representative Matt Gaetz filed a motion to vacate the House speakership of California Republican Kevin McCarthy. The measure prevailed as 216 were in favor and 210 opposed. It was the first time ever the House of Representatives had removed its speaker from office. All voting House Democrats plus Rosendale and seven other Republicans cast votes for his removal.

On March 19, 2024, Rosendale voted nay on House Resolution 149, which condemned the illegal abduction and forcible transfer of children from Ukraine to the Russian Federation. He was one of nine Republicans to do so.

==== Committee assignments ====
- Committee on Veterans Affairs
  - Subcommittee on Health
  - Subcommittee on Technology Modernization (Ranking Member)
- Committee on Natural Resources
  - Subcommittee on National Parks, Forests and Public Lands
  - Subcommittee on Indigenous Peoples of the United States

==== Caucus memberships ====
- Freedom Caucus
- Republican Study Committee

=== U.S. Senate ===
==== 2018 election ====
In 2017, Rosendale announced he would seek the Republican nomination to challenge two-term incumbent Democratic senator Jon Tester.

In a competitive four-way primary, Rosendale faced district judge Russell Fagg, state senator Al Olszewski, and combat veteran Troy Downing. Rosendale won the Republican primary with 33.8% of the vote to Fagg's 28.3%, Downing's 19.1% and Olszewski's 18.7%.

After the primary, Rosendale was endorsed by President Donald Trump and Vice President Mike Pence. Trump visited the state to campaign for Rosendale four times, while Pence visited three times.

During his 2018 campaign, Rosendale faced criticism for repeatedly presenting himself as a "rancher" in interviews and campaign materials despite owning no cattle or a cattle brand according to public records. Critics labelled Rosendale "all hat, no cattle". Rosendale, who bought a $2 million ranch near Glendive when he moved to Montana in 2002, said he leased his land and helps run cattle on it. Rosendale later removed the "rancher" label from bios on his website and social media accounts.

Polls showed the race in a statistical tie going into Election Day, in what was the most expensive election in Montana history, with more than $70 million spent between the two sides. Tester's campaign had a huge cash advantage, raising and spending $21 million to Rosendale's $6 million.

In the general election, Tester won 50.3% of the vote to Rosendale's 46.8%, with Libertarian candidate Rick Breckenridge taking 2.9%.

==== 2024 election ====
In August 2023, Politico reported that Rosendale was "moving closer" to running for U.S. Senate in 2024. He officially entered the race on February 9, 2024; Trump endorsed a different candidate hours later, and Rosendale dropped out a week later.

Shortly after Rosendale dropped out of the race, Heidi Heitkamp, a former Democratic senator from North Dakota, alleged on an episode of the "Talking Feds" podcast that Rosendale may have impregnated a 20-year-old staffer, and would likely resign from the House as a result. Heitkamp did not present evidence for these claims. Ron Kovach, a Rosendale spokesman, rejected the accusation as false and defamatory, and stated that Heitkamp would be the target of legal action. On March 8, 2024, Rosendale announced that he would also not run for reelection to his House seat, saying that "defamatory rumors" and alleged death threats had impeded his ability to serve.

== Personal life ==
Rosendale and his wife Jean reside on a ranch north of Glendive. They have three adult children. Their son, Adam Rosendale, served briefly in the Montana Legislature in 2017.

Rosendale has served as head of his local Catholic parish council.

== Electoral history ==
=== 2010 ===
2010 Montana's 38th House district election
Party	Candidate	Votes	%
Republican	Matt Rosendale	1,932	52.7
Democratic	Dennis Getz (incumbent)	1,735	47.3
Total votes		3,667	100.0
Republican gain from Democratic			

=== 2012 ===
2012 Montana's 19th Senate district election
Party	Candidate	Votes	%
Republican	Matt Rosendale	5,929	67.6
Democratic	Fred Lake	2,842	32.4
Total votes		8,771	100.0

=== 2014 ===
2014 Republican primary for Montana's at-large congressional district
Party	Candidate	Votes	%
Republican	Ryan Zinke	43,766	33.3
Republican	Corey Stapleton	38,591	29.3
Republican	Matt Rosendale	37,965	28.8
Republican	Elsie Arntzen	9,011	6.9
Republican	Drew Turiano	2,290	1.7
Total votes		131,623	100.0

=== 2016 ===
2016 Montana State Auditor election
Party	Candidate	Votes	%
Republican	Matt Rosendale	256,378	53.6
Democratic	Jesse Laslovich	221,551	46.4
Total votes		477,929	100.0
Republican gain from Democratic			

=== 2018 ===
2018 United States Senate Republican primary in Montana
Party	Candidate	Votes	%
Republican	Matt Rosendale	51,859	33.8%
Republican	Russ Fagg	43,465	28.3%
Republican	Troy Downing	29,341	19.1%
Republican	Al Olszewski	28,681	18.7%
Total votes		153,346	100.00%

2018 United States Senate election in Montana
Party	Candidate	Votes	%
Democratic	Jon Tester (incumbent)	253,876	50.33%
Republican	Matt Rosendale	235,963	46.78%
Libertarian	Rick Breckenridge	14,545	2.88%
Total votes		504,384	100.00%
Democratic hold			

=== 2020 ===
2020 Republican primary for Montana's at-large congressional district
Party	Candidate	Votes	%
Republican	Matt Rosendale	104,286	48.3
Republican	Corey Stapleton	71,593	33.2
Republican	Debra Lamm	14,418	6.7
Republican	Joe Dooling	13,689	6.3
Republican	Mark McGinley	7,790	3.6
Republican	John Evankovich	3,965	1.8
Total votes		215,471	100.0

2020 Montana's at-large congressional district
Party	Candidate	Votes	%
Republican	Matt Rosendale	339,169	56.39%
Democratic	Kathleen Williams	262,340	43.61%
Total votes		601,509	100.00%
Republican hold			

=== 2022 ===
2022 Republican primary for Montana's 2nd congressional district
Party	Candidate	Votes	%
Republican	Matt Rosendale (incumbent)	73,453	75.7
Republican	Kyle Austin	11,930	12.3
Republican	Charles Walking Child	5,909	6.1
Republican	James Boyette	5,712	5.9
Total votes		97,004	100.0

2022 Montana's 2nd congressional district election
Party	Candidate	Votes	%
Republican	Matt Rosendale (incumbent)	121,979	56.56%
Independent	Gary Buchanan	47,195	21.88%
Democratic	Penny Ronning	43,480	20.16%
Libertarian	Sam Rankin	3,018	1.40%
Total votes		215,672	100.00%
Republican hold			

Political offices
Preceded by Monica Lindeen	Auditor of Montana; 2017–2021	Succeeded by Troy Downing
Party political offices
Preceded by Denny Rehberg	Republican nominee for U.S. Senator from Montana (Class 1); 2018	Succeeded by Tim Sheehy
U.S. House of Representatives
Preceded by Greg Gianforte	Member of the U.S. House of Representatives from Montana's at-large congressional district 2021–2023	Constituency abolished
New constituency	Member of the U.S. House of Representatives from Montana's 2nd congressional district 2023–2025	Succeeded by Troy Downing
U.S. order of precedence (ceremonial)
Preceded by Rick Hill as Former U.S. Representative	Order of precedence of the United States as Former U.S. Representative	Succeeded by Linda Smith as Former U.S. Representative
