= Russell Fagg =

American politician

Russ Fagg

District Judge for Yellowstone County
- In office 1995–2017
- Preceded by: Russell Fillner
- Succeeded by: Don Harris

Member of the Montana House of Representatives from the 89th district
- In office 1991–1995
- Preceded by: Mary McDonough
- Succeeded by: Peggy Arnott

Personal details
- Born: June 26, 1960 (age 66)
- Party: Republican
- Relatives: Harrison Fagg (father)
- Education: Whitman College (BA); University of Montana, Missoula (JD); University of Nevada, Reno (MJur)

Russell C. Fagg (born June 26, 1960) is an American attorney, former judge, and politician. A Republican, he served two terms in the Montana House of Representatives from 1991 to 1995. He succeeded Mary McDonough in the 89th district. Fagg was succeeded by Peggy Arnott.

Fagg was elected district judge in Yellowstone County, Montana, in 1994. He defeated the incumbent, Russell Fillner. He retired in October 2017. Fagg was succeeded by Don Harris. He was a candidate in the Republican primary for the 2018 U.S. Senate election in Montana.

In 2018, He supported the death penalty for illegal aliens that murder.

== Career ==
- Montana House of Representatives (1991—1995)
- District Judge for Yellowstone County, Montana (1995—2017)
