= James Brown (Montana politician) =

American politician (born in 1971)

- Brown speaking at an Elder Justice Summit in Kalispell, Montana on July 22, 2026.

18th Auditor of Montana
- Incumbent
- Assumed office January 6, 2025
- Governor: Greg Gianforte
- Preceded by: Troy Downing

Personal details
- Born: February 13, 1971 (age 55)
- Party: Republican
- Education: University of Montana (BA); Seattle University (JD); University of Washington (LLM)

James Brown is an American politician who is currently serving as the 18th Montana State Auditor, having taken office in January 2025. Brown, a Republican, previously served as president of the Montana Public Service Commission.

== Biography ==
Brown is a fourth-generation Montanan from Beaverhead County, where he graduated from Beaverhead County High School in 1989. Brown earned a bachelor's degree from the University of Montana at Missoula, where he double majored in political science and history and minored in Spanish. Brown then earned a J.D from Seattle University School of Law and a master's degree in tax law from the University of Washington at Seattle.

Brown has worked as a congressional aide, including to former US Senator Conrad Burns, clerked for the Washington State Supreme Court, and ran a private legal practice.

== Political career ==
In 2020, James Brown was elected as the Public Service Commissioner for District 3. Following his election to the Public Service Commission, he was elected the President of the Public Service Commission.

In 2022, Brown ran lost a race for Montana Supreme Court to the incumbent justice, Ingrid Gustafson. While the office is considered non-partisan, Montana Republican leaders supported Brown early in his campaign; the Montana Republican Party sent out mailers naming Brown's high-level Republican endorsements. The race was named as the most expensive state Supreme Court race in Montana history.

In 2024, Brown was elected to be the Montana State Auditor and Commissioner of Securities and Insurance, defeating Democratic candidate John Repke with over 61% of the vote.

Since taking office, Brown has increased the agency's public outreach to educate Montanans about fraud and scam threats, developed strategic performance metrics for the office, and bolstered the office's investigatory mission. Between July 1, 2024 and June 30, 2025, Brown's office denied $21.6 million in proposed insurance rate increases, benefiting more than 77,000 Montanans. In Fiscal Year 2025-2026, Brown's office denied more than $18.4 million in unjustified insurance rate increases, benefiting 127,855 Montanans.

Under Brown's leadership, the agency has also helped identify and stop tens of millions of dollars in wrongful billing associated with an Affordable Care Act fraud scheme that targeted Montana's native communities. The scheme allegedly involved out-of-state treatment providers enrolling tribal members in Obamacare using fake information, transporting them across state lines, and billing them for treatments that never occurred, were inadequate, unnecessary, or at inflated costs.

As State Auditor, Brown has engaged in outreach aimed at fraud prevention, specifically fraud schemes that target seniors. In July 2026, Brown appeared alongside Montana Attorney General Austin Knudsen at an Elder Justice Summit in Kalispell, Montana, where he delivered a presentation on how to spot and avoid fraud.

In response to rising homeowners insurance costs and limited coverage options in Montana, Brown's office began hosting forums around the state to engage with the public on the issue and inform them about the Auditor's office and its resources. At an August 2026 forum in Hamilton, Montana, Brown said that the agency is exploring wildfire mitigation efforts, including potential grant opportunities aimed at reducing wildfire risk and improving insurance availability.

In September 2026, Brown launched the first comprehensive market conduct review of Blue Cross and Blue Shield of Montana in over a decade to determine whether the company, which is the state's largest health insurer, is fully complying with Montana's laws and regulations.

Brown also serves on Montana's five-member Board of Land Commissioners, which manages roughly 5.2 million acres of state trust lands to generate revenue for public education in Montana and other trust beneficiaries; in 2025, the Land Board generated more than $80 million for public education via state trust land management.

Political offices
Preceded by Troy Downing	Auditor of Montana; 2025–present	Incumbent
