= Montana State Auditor =

State office in Montana, United States

State Auditor of Montana
- Incumbent; James Brown since January 6, 2025
- Term length: 4 years
- Formation: 1889
- Website: Montana State Auditor

The Montana state auditor is a constitutional officer in the executive branch of government of the U.S. state of Montana. The state auditor is elected once every four years, concurrent with the state's gubernatorial election and the U.S. presidential election. The current state auditor is James Brown, who was first elected in November 2024 and took office in January 2025.

== Powers and duties ==
Unlike counterparts in all other states, the Montana state auditor does not audit public accounts or maintain fiscal control over the state treasury. Rather, in Montana the officeholder is ex officio "Commissioner of Securities and Insurance". To this end, the Office of the State Auditor assures compliance with Montana's insurance and securities laws, promotes captive insurance formations, supports capital formation in the state, as well as assists consumers with complaints involving the securities.

The Montana state auditor carries out this function by licensing, registering, auditing and regulating insurance companies and producers, securities issuers, salespeople, broker-dealers, investment advisors and investment adviser representatives within the state. In addition, the state auditor serves as a member of the Board of Land Commissioners and the Crop Hail Insurance Board.

== History of the office ==
Established in 1889 upon statehood, the initial responsibilities of the Office of the State Auditor were to superintend and manage the fiscal affairs of the state as its financial controller. According to the statutes of 1897, 1921, 1935, and 1947, the state auditor was required to submit a biennial report to the Governor on the funds of the state, and the revenues and expenditures of the preceding two years, along with an estimate of revenues and expenditures of the upcoming year.

The state auditor also suggested plans for the improvement and management of state revenues, kept and stated all accounts in which the state is interested, drew warrants on the State Treasurer and kept a record of warrants lawfully drawn, instituted suits to collect all delinquent monies, served as a member of the State Board of Equalization, conducted examinations of insurance companies when necessary, approved blanks for election expense accounts, received financial and statistical reports from railroads, and procured and printed all licenses issued by the state.

Later in 1909, 1911, 1913, and 1921, the state auditor assumed responsibility for regulating insurance, securities, and real estate and investigating arsons. As a result of a 1970s state government reorganization, the constitutional office of state treasurer was abolished and the state auditor's financial management duties were transferred to the newly created Department of Revenue. Likewise, the Public Service Commission assumed the state auditor's duties concerning railroad regulation. The remaining duties – insurance and securities regulation – constitute the core function of the state auditor's office today.

== List of auditors ==
=== Territory ===
- John S. Lott (1865–1866)
- John H. Ming (1866–1867)
- William H. Rodgers (1867–1874)
- George Callaway (1874–1874)
- Solomon Star (1874–1876)
- D. H. Cuthbert (1876–1879)
- Joseph P. Woolman (1879–1887)
- James Sullivan (1887–1889)

=== State ===
- Edwin A. Kenney (1889–1893)
- Andrew B. Cook (1893–1897)
- Thomas W. Poindexter, Jr. (1897–1901)
- James H. Calderhead (1901–1905)
- Henry R. Cunningham (1905–1911)
- C. M. McCoy (1911–1913)
- William Keating (1913–1917)
- Rufus G. Poland (1917–1919)
- George P. Porter (1919–1933)
- John J. Holmes (1933–1962)
- E. V. "Sonny" Omholt (1962–1985)
- Andrea Bennett (1985–1993)
- Mark O'Keefe (1993–2001)
- John Morrison (2001–2009)
- Monica Lindeen (2009–2017)
- Matt Rosendale (2017–2021)
- Troy Downing (2021–2025)
- James Brown (2025–present)
