= 2018 Montana House of Representatives election =

- November 6, 2018

All 100 seats in the Montana House of Representatives 51 seats needed for a majority
	Majority party	Minority party
Leader	Austin Knudsen (term-limited)	Jenny Eck (retired)
Party	Republican	Democratic
Leader since	January 5, 2015	January 2, 2017
Leader's seat	34th – Culbertson	79th – Helena
Last election	59	41
Seats won	58	42
Seat change	▼1	▲1
Popular vote	243,143	207,402
Percentage	52.56%	44.84%
- Results: Republican gain Democratic gain Republican hold Democratic hold
Speaker before election
Austin Knudsen
Republican
Elected Speaker
Greg Hertz
Republican

An election was held on November 6, 2018, to elect all 100 members to Montana's House of Representatives. The election coincided with the elections for other offices, including the U.S Senate, U.S. House of Representatives, and state senate. The primary election was held on June 5, 2018.

== Results summary ==
Party	Candi- dates	Votes		Seats		
Party	Candi- dates	No.	%	No.	+/–	%
Republican Party	81	243,143	52.56%	58	▼1	58
Democratic Party	85	207,402	44.84%	42	▲1	42
Libertarian Party	13	10,846	2.34%	0	Steady	0
Independent	1	1,179	0.25%	0	Steady	0
Total	180	462,570	100	100	Steady	100

House seats
Republican	58%
Democratic	42%

Popular vote
Republican	52.563%
Democratic	44.836%
Libertarian	2.345%
Independent	0.255%

=== Incumbents defeated in the general election ===
- Jeremy Trebas (R-District 25), defeated by Jasmine Krotkov (D)
- Adam Hertz (R-District 96), defeated by Tom Winter (D)

=== Open seats that changed parties ===
- Tom Jacobson (D-District 21) ran for the Montana Senate, seat won by Ed Buttrey (R)
- Jon Knokey (R-District 65) did not seek re-election, seat won by Christopher Pope (D)
- John Fleming (D-District 93) did not seek re-election, seat won by Joe Read (R)

== Predictions ==
Source	Ranking	As of
Governing	Safe R	October 8, 2018

== Detailed results ==
=== Districts 1–20 ===
==== District 1 ====
Incumbent Republican Steve Gunderson had represented the 1st district since 2017.

Montana House of Representatives 1st district general election, 2018
Party	Candidate	Votes	%
Republican	Steve Gunderson (incumbent)	3,014	72.94%
Democratic	Donald Coats	1,118	27.06%
Total votes		4,132	100%
Republican hold			

==== District 2 ====
Incumbent Republican Mike Cuffe had represented the 2nd district since 2011. Cuffe was term-limited and successfully ran for a seat in the Montana Senate.

Montana House of Representatives 2nd district general election, 2018
Party	Candidate	Votes	%
Republican	Neil Duram	4,325	100%
Total votes		4,325	100%
Republican hold			

==== District 3 ====
Incumbent Democrat Zac Perry had represented the 3rd district since 2015.

Montana House of Representatives 3rd district general election, 2018
Party	Candidate	Votes	%
Democratic	Zac Perry (incumbent)	2,300	49.26%
Republican	Jerry O'Neil	2,266	48.53%
Libertarian	Shawn Leslie Guymon	103	2.21%
Total votes		4,669	100%
Democratic hold			

==== District 4 ====
Incumbent Republican Matt Regier had represented the 4th district since 2017.

Montana House of Representatives 4th district general election, 2018
Party	Candidate	Votes	%
Republican	Matt Regier (incumbent)	4,100	75.80%
Democratic	Kwen Shirley	1,309	24.20%
Total votes		5,409	100%
Republican hold			

==== District 5 ====
Incumbent Democrat Dave Fern had represented the 5th district since 2017.

Montana House of Representatives 5th district general election, 2018
Party	Candidate	Votes	%
Democratic	Dave Fern (incumbent)	3,882	69.12%
Libertarian	Cindy Dyson	1,734	30.88%
Total votes		5,616	100%
Democratic hold			

==== District 6 ====
Incumbent Republican Carl Glimm had represented the 6th district since 2013.

Montana House of Representatives 6th district general election, 2018
Party	Candidate	Votes	%
Republican	Carl Glimm (incumbent)	3,837	66.27%
Democratic	Mary Custer	1,953	33.73%
Total votes		5,790	100%
Republican hold			

==== District 7 ====
Incumbent Republican Frank Garner had represented the 7th district since 2015.

Montana House of Representatives 7th district general election, 2018
Party	Candidate	Votes	%
Republican	Frank Garner (incumbent)	2,519	65.46%
Democratic	James H. Cossitt	1,329	34.54%
Total votes		3,848	100%
Republican hold			

==== District 8 ====
Incumbent Republican Steve Lavin had represented the 8th district since 2011. Lavin was term-limited and could not seek re-election.

Montana House of Representatives 8th district general election, 2018
Party	Candidate	Votes	%
Republican	John Fuller	3,153	68.65%
Libertarian	Sid Daoud	1,440	31.35%
Total votes		4,593	100%
Republican hold			

==== District 9 ====
Incumbent Republican Randy Brodehl had represented the 9th district and its predecessors since 2011. Brodehl was term-limited and could not seek re-election.

Montana House of representatives 9th district general election, 2018
Party	Candidate	Votes	%
Republican	David Dunn	2,626	69.56%
Democratic	Bob Petersen	1,149	30.44%
Total votes		3,775	100%
Republican hold			

==== District 10 ====
Incumbent Republican Mark Noland had represented the 10th district since 2015.

Montana House of Representatives 10th district general election, 2018
Party	Candidate	Votes	%
Republican	Mark Noland (incumbent)	4,324	79.72%
Libertarian	Bill Jones	1,100	20.28%
Total votes		5,424	100%
Republican hold			

==== District 11 ====
Incumbent Republican Derek Skees had represented the 11th district since 2017.

Montana House of Representatives 11th district general election, 2018
Party	Candidate	Votes	%
Republican	Derek Skees (incumbent)	3,667	71.12%
Democratic	Jobeth Blair	1,489	28.88%
Total votes		5,156	100%
Republican hold			

==== District 12 ====
Incumbent Republican House Speaker Pro Tempore Greg Hertz had represented the 12th district since 2015.

Montana House of Representatives 12th district general election, 2018
Party	Candidate	Votes	%
Republican	Greg Hertz (incumbent)	3,296	60.63%
Democratic	Susan T. Evans	2,140	39.37%
Total votes		5,436	100%
Republican hold			

==== District 13 ====
Incumbent Republican Bob Brown had represented the 13th district since 2015.

Montana House of Representatives 13th district general election, 2018
Party	Candidate	Votes	%
Republican	Bob Brown (incumbent)	4,064	75.45%
Democratic	Chris Gross	1,322	24.55%
Total votes		5,386	100%
Republican hold			

==== District 14 ====
Incumbent Republican Denley Loge had represented the 14th district since 2017.

Montana House of Representatives 14th district general election, 2018
Party	Candidate	Votes	%
Republican	Denley Loge (incumbent)	3,590	73.10%
Democratic	Diane L. Magone	1,321	26.90%
Total votes		4,911	100%
Republican hold			

==== District 15 ====
Incumbent Democrat George Kipp III had represented the 15th district since 2015. Kipp did not seek re-election.

Montana House of Representatives 15th district general election, 2018
Party	Candidate	Votes	%
Democratic	Marvin Weatherwax Jr.	2,529	100%
Total votes		2,529	100%
Democratic hold			

==== District 16 ====
Incumbent Democrat Susan Webber had represented the 16th district since 2015. Webber successfully ran for a seat in the Montana Senate.

Montana House of Representatives 16th district general election, 2018
Party	Candidate	Votes	%
Democratic	Tyson Runningwolf	2,039	61.43%
Republican	K. Webb Galbreath	1,280	38.57%
Total votes		3,319	100%
Democratic hold			

==== District 17 ====
Incumbent Republican Ross Fitzgerald had represented the 17th district since 2017.

Montana House of Representatives 17th district general election, 2018
Party	Candidate	Votes	%
Republican	Ross Fitzgerald (incumbent)	3,595	74.71%
Democratic	Richard (Rick) Kerr	1,217	25.29%
Total votes		4,812	100%
Republican hold			

==== District 18 ====
Incumbent Republican Rob Cook had represented the 18th district since 2011. Cook was term-limited and he unsuccessfully ran for a seat on the Montana Public Service Commission. State Senator Llew Jones won the open seat.

Montana House of Representatives 18th district general election, 2018
Party	Candidate	Votes	%
Republican	Llew Jones	3,232	100%
Total votes		3,232	100%
Republican hold			

==== District 19 ====
Incumbent Republican Wendy McKamey had represented the 19th district since 2017.

Montana House of Representatives 19th district general election, 2018
Party	Candidate	Votes	%
Republican	Wendy McKamey (incumbent)	3,212	71.99%
Democratic	Lynelle Melton	1,250	28.01%
Total votes		4,462	100%
Republican hold			

==== District 20 ====
Incumbent Republican Fred Anderson had represented the 20th district since 2017.

Montana House of representatives 20th district general election, 2018
Party	Candidate	Votes	%
Republican	Fred Anderson (incumbent)	3,826	68.48%
Democratic	Keaton Sunchild	1,761	31.52%
Total votes		5,587	100%
Republican hold			

=== Districts 21–40 ===
==== District 21 ====
Incumbent Democrat Tom Jacobson had represented the 21st district since 2013. Jacobson ran successfully for a seat in the Montana Senate. Republican state senator Ed Buttrey won the open seat.

Montana House of Representatives 21st district general election, 2018
Party	Candidate	Votes	%
Republican	Ed Buttrey	2,432	53.59%
Democratic	Leesha Ford	2,106	46.41%
Total votes		4,538	100%
Republican gain from Democratic			

==== District 22 ====
Incumbent Republican Lola Sheldon-Galloway had represented the 22nd district since 2017.

Montana House of Representatives 22nd district general election, 2018
Party	Candidate	Votes	%
Republican	Lola Sheldon-Galloway (incumbent)	1,882	50.19%
Democratic	Laura Dever	1,868	49.81%
Total votes		3,750	100%
Republican hold			

==== District 23 ====
Incumbent Democrat Brad Hamlett had represented the 23rd district since 2017.

Montana House of Representatives 23rd district general election, 2018
Party	Candidate	Votes	%
Democratic	Brad Hamlett (incumbent)	1,849	54.90%
Republican	William Smith	1,519	45.10%
Total votes		3,368	100%
Democratic hold			

==== District 24 ====
Incumbent Democrat Jean Price had represented the 24th district and its predecessors since 2011. Price was term-limited and could not seek re-election.

Montana House of Representatives 24th district general election, 2018
Party	Candidate	Votes	%
Democratic	Barbara Bessette	2,014	52.37%
Republican	Mike "Mac" McNamara	1,832	47.63%
Total votes		3,846	100%
Democratic hold			

==== District 25 ====
Incumbent Republican Jeremy Trebas had represented the 25th district since 2017. Trebas lost re-election to Democrat Jasmine Krotkov.

Montana House of Representatives 25th district general election, 2018
Party	Candidate	Votes	%
Democratic	Jasmine Krotkov	1,907	51.74%
Republican	Jeremy Trebas (incumbent)	1,779	48.26%
Total votes		3,686	100%
Democratic gain from Republican			

==== District 26 ====
Incumbent Democrat Casey Schreiner had represented the 26th district and its predecessors since 2013.

Montana House of Representatives 26th district general election, 2018
Party	Candidate	Votes	%
Democratic	Casey Schreiner (incumbent)	1,397	55.77%
Republican	Michael K. Cooper Sr.	1,108	44.23%
Total votes		2,505	100%
Democratic hold			

==== District 27 ====
Incumbent Republican Jim O'Hara had represented the 27th district since 2017. O'Hara did not seek re-election.

Montana House of Representatives 27th district general election, 2018
Party	Candidate	Votes	%
Republican	Joshua Kassmier	3,434	70.57%
Democratic	Dan Nelsen	1,432	29.43%
Total votes		4,866	100%
Republican hold			

==== District 28 ====
Incumbent Democrat Jacob Bachmeier had represented the 28th district since 2017.

Montana House of Representatives district general election, 2018
Party	Candidate	Votes	%
Democratic	Jacob Bachmeier (incumbent)	2,269	58.95%
Independent	Robert Sivertsen	1,179	30.63%
Libertarian	Conor Burns	401	10.42%
Total votes		3,849	100%
Democratic hold			

==== District 29 ====
Incumbent Republican Dan Bartel had represented the 29th district since 2017.

Montana House of Representatives 29th district general election, 2018
Party	Candidate	Votes	%
Republican	Dan Bartel (incumbent)	3,497	71.32%
Democratic	Rachel Stansberry	1,406	28.68%
Total votes		4,903	100%
Republican hold			

==== District 30 ====
Incumbent Republican Wylie Galt had represented the 30th district since 2017.

Montana House of Representatives 30th district general election, 2018
Party	Candidate	Votes	%
Republican	Wylie Galt (incumbent)	3,990	82.23%
Libertarian	Kathryn G.H. Nicholes	862	17.77%
Total votes		4,852	100%
Republican hold			

==== District 31 ====
Incumbent Democrat Bridget Smith had represented the 31st district since 2013.

Montana House of Representatives 31st district general election, 2018
Party	Candidate	Votes	%
Democratic	Bridget Smith (incumbent)	2,360	100%
Total votes		2,360	100%
Democratic hold			

==== District 32 ====
Incumbent Democrat Jonathan Windy Boy had represented the 32nd district since 2017.

Montana House of Representatives district general election, 2018
Party	Candidate	Votes	%
Democratic	Jonathan Windy Boy (incumbent)	2,355	63.34%
Republican	Gilbert Bruce Meyers	1,363	36.66%
Total votes		3,718	100%
Democratic hold			

==== District 33 ====
Incumbent Republican Casey Knudsen had represented the 33rd district since 2017.

Montana House of Representatives 33rd district general election, 2018
Party	Candidate	Votes	%
Republican	Casey Knudsen (incumbent)	3,819	100%
Total votes		3,819	100%
Republican hold			

==== District 34 ====
Incumbent Republican House Speaker Austin Knudsen had represented the 34th district since 2011. Knudsen was term-limited and could not seek re-election.

Montana House of Representatives 34th district general election, 2018
Party	Candidate	Votes	%
Republican	Rhonda Knudsen	4,231	100%
Total votes		4,231	100%
Republican hold			

==== District 35 ====
Incumbent Republican Scott Staffanson had represented the 35th district since 2013. Staffanson did not seek re-election.

Montana House of Representatives 35th district general election, 2018
Party	Candidate	Votes	%
Republican	Joel Krautter	3,688	100%
Total votes		3,688	100%
Republican hold			

==== District 36 ====
Incumbent Republican Alan Doane had represented the 36th district since 2013.

Montana House of Representatives 36th district general election, 2018
Party	Candidate	Votes	%
Republican	Alan Doane (incumbent)	3,765	100%
Total votes		3,765	100%
Republican hold			

==== District 37 ====
Incumbent Republican Bill Harris had represented the 37th district and its predecessors since 2011. Harris was term-limited and could not seek re-election. State Senator Eric Moore won the open seat.

Montana House of Representatives 37th district general election, 2018
Party	Candidate	Votes	%
Republican	Eric Moore	4,746	100%
Total votes		4,746	100%
Republican hold			

==== District 38 ====
Incumbent Republican Kenneth Holmlund had represented the 38th district since 2015.

Montana House of Representatives 38th district general election, 2018
Party	Candidate	Votes	%
Republican	Kenneth Holmlund (incumbent)	2,576	67.66%
Democratic	Bert Pezzarossi	1,231	32.34%
Total votes		3,807	100%
Republican hold			

==== District 39 ====
Incumbent Republican Geraldine Custer hasdrepresented the 39th district since 2015.

Montana House of Representatives 39th district general election, 2018
Party	Candidate	Votes	%
Republican	Geraldine Custer (incumbent)	4,165	100%
Total votes		4,165	100%
Republican hold			

==== District 40 ====
Incumbent Republican Barry Usher had represented the 40th district since 2017.

Montana House of Representatives 40th district general election, 2018
Party	Candidate	Votes	%
Republican	Barry Usher (incumbent)	3,826	79.41%
Democratic	Lisa Barton	992	20.59%
Total votes		4,818	100%
Republican hold			

=== Districts 41–60 ===
==== District 41 ====
Incumbent Democrat Rae Peppers had represented the 41st district since 2013.

Montana House of Representatives 41st district general election, 2018
Party	Candidate	Votes	%
Democratic	Rae Peppers (incumbent)	2,001	100%
Total votes		2,001	100%
Democratic hold			

==== District 42 ====
Incumbent Democrat Sharon Stewart-Peregoy had represented the 42nd district since 2017.

Montana House of Representatives 42nd district general election, 2018
Party	Candidate	Votes	%
Democratic	Sharon Stewart-Peregoy (incumbent)	2,748	100%
Total votes		2,748	100%
Democratic hold			

==== District 43 ====
Incumbent Republican Peggy Webb had represented the 43rd district since 2017.

Montana House of Representatives 43rd district general election, 2018
Party	Candidate	Votes	%
Republican	Peggy Webb (incumbent)	2,785	64.90%
Democratic	Blair Koch	1,506	35.10%
Total votes		4,291	100%
Republican hold			

==== District 44 ====
Incumbent Republican Dale Mortensen had represented the 44th district since 2015.

Montana House of Representatives 44th district general election, 2018
Party	Candidate	Votes	%
Republican	Dale Mortensen (incumbent)	2,229	55.01%
Democratic	Ming Cabrera	1,823	44.99%
Total votes		4,052	100%
Republican hold			

==== District 45 ====
Incumbent Republican Daniel Zolnikov had represented the 45th district since 2013.

Montana House of Representatives 45th district general election, 2018
Party	Candidate	Votes	%
Republican	Daniel Zolnikov (incumbent)	3,150	66.84%
Democratic	Danny Choriki	1,563	33.16%
Total votes		4,713	100%
Republican hold			

==== District 46 ====
Incumbent Republican Don Jones had represented the 46th district since 2013. Jones did not seek re-election.

Montana House of Representatives 46th district general election, 2018
Party	Candidate	Votes	%
Republican	Bill Mercer	3,386	59.16%
Democratic	Anne Giuliano	2,337	40.84%
Total votes		5,723	100%
Republican hold			

==== District 47 ====
Incumbent Democrat Katharin Kelker had represented the 47th district since 2015.

Montana House of Representatives 47th district general election, 2018
Party	Candidate	Votes	%
Democratic	Katharin Kelker (incumbent)	2,352	59.73%
Republican	Colton Zaugg	1,586	40.27%
Total votes		3,938	100%
Democratic hold			

==== District 48 ====
Incumbent Democrat Jessica Karjala had represented the 48th district since 2015.

Montana House of Representatives 48th district general election, 2018
Party	Candidate	Votes	%
Democratic	Jessica Karjala (incumbent)	2,465	54.33%
Republican	Denise Johnson	2,072	45.67%
Total votes		4,537	100%
Democratic hold			

==== District 49 ====
Incumbent Democrat Emma Kerr-Carpenter had represented the 49th district since 2018. She was elected to a full term.

Montana House of Representatives 49th district general election, 2018
Party	Candidate	Votes	%
Democratic	Emma Kerr-Carpenter (incumbent)	1,953	61.22%
Republican	Colin Nygaard	1,237	38.78%
Total votes		3,190	100%
Democratic hold			

==== District 50 ====
Incumbent Democrat Virginia Court had represented the 50th district and its predecessors since 2011. Court was term-limited and could not seek re-election.

Montana House of Representatives 50th district general election, 2018
Party	Candidate	Votes	%
Democratic	Jade Bahr	1,898	53.30%
Republican	Quentin Eggart	1,473	41.36%
Libertarian	Nathan McKenty	190	5.34%
Total votes		3,561	100%
Democratic hold			

==== District 51 ====
Incumbent Republican Frank Fleming had represented the 51st district since 2018. Fleming was elected to a full term.

Montana House of Representatives 51st district general election, 2018
Party	Candidate	Votes	%
Republican	Frank Fleming (incumbent)	1,838	50.23%
Democratic	Darryl S. Wilson	1,821	49.77%
Total votes		3,659	100%
Republican hold			

==== District 52 ====
Incumbent Republican Jimmy Patelis had represented the 52nd district since 2017. Patelis did not seek re-election.

Montana House of Representatives 52nd district general election, 2018
Party	Candidate	Votes	%
Republican	Rodney Garcia	1,858	53.25%
Democratic	Amelia Marquez	1,631	46.75%
Total votes		3,489	100%
Republican hold			

==== District 53 ====
Incumbent Republican Dennis Lenz had represented the 53rd district since 2017.

Montana House of Representatives 53rd district general election, 2018
Party	Candidate	Votes	%
Republican	Dennis Lenz (incumbent)	5,240	72.06%
Democratic	Clementine Lindley	2,032	27.94%
Total votes		7,272	100%
Republican hold			

==== District 54 ====
Incumbent Republican Jeff Essmann had represented the 54th district since 2015. Essmann did not seek re-election.

Montana House of Representatives 54th district general election, 2018
Party	Candidate	Votes	%
Republican	Terry Moore	3,187	57.39%
Democratic	Ben McKee	2,366	42.61%
Total votes		5,553	100%
Republican hold			

==== District 55 ====
Incumbent Republican Vince Ricci had represented the 55th district since 2015.

Montana House of Representatives 55th district general election, 2018
Party	Candidate	Votes	%
Republican	Vince Ricci (incumbent)	3,070	70.97%
Democratic	Kathleen O'Donnell	1,256	29.03%
Total votes		4,326	100%
Republican hold			

==== District 56 ====
Incumbent Republican Sue Vinton had represented the 56th district since 2017.

Montana House of Representatives 56th district general election, 2018
Party	Candidate	Votes	%
Republican	Sue Vinton (incumbent)	2,822	67.51%
Democratic	Janna J. Lind	1,358	32.49%
Total votes		4,180	100%
Republican hold			

==== District 57 ====
Incumbent Republican Forrest Mandeville had represented the 57th district since 2015.

Montana House of Representatives 57th district general election, 2018
Party	Candidate	Votes	%
Republican	Forrest Mandeville (incumbent)	4,466	100%
Total votes		4,466	100%
Republican hold			

==== District 58 ====
Incumbent Republican Seth Berglee had represented the 58th district since 2015.

Montana House of Representatives 58th district general election, 2018
Party	Candidate	Votes	%
Republican	Seth Berglee (incumbent)	3,540	59.08%
Democratic	Anna Drew	2,452	40.92%
Total votes		5,992	100%
Republican hold			

==== District 59 ====
Incumbent Republican Alan Redfield had represented the 59th district since 2013.

Montana House of Representatives 59th district general election, 2018
Party	Candidate	Votes	%
Republican	Alan Redfield (incumbent)	4,041	66.56%
Democratic	Quenby Iandiorio	2,030	33.44%
Total votes		6,071	100%
Republican hold			

==== District 60 ====
Incumbent Democrat Laurie Bishop had represented the 60th district since 2017.

Montana House of Representatives 60th district general election, 2018
Party	Candidate	Votes	%
Democratic	Laurie Bishop (incumbent)	3,232	57.52%
Republican	Dan Skattum	2,387	42.48%
Total votes		5,619	100%
Democratic hold			

=== Districts 61–80 ===
==== District 61 ====
Incumbent Democrat Jim Hamilton had represented the 61st district and its predecessors since 2017.

Montana House of Representatives 61st district general election, 2018
Party	Candidate	Votes	%
Democratic	Jim Hamilton (incumbent)	4,906	74.86%
Libertarian	A. Alexander Fetto	1,648	25.14%
Total votes		6,554	100%
Democratic hold			

==== District 62 ====
Incumbent Democrat Tom Woods had represented the 62nd district since 2013.

Montana House of Representatives 62nd district general election, 2018
Party	Candidate	Votes	%
Democratic	Tom Woods (incumbent)	5,391	100%
Total votes		5,391	100%
Democratic hold			

==== District 63 ====
Incumbent Democrat Zach Brown had represented the 63rd district since 2015.

Montana House of Representatives 63rd district general election, 2018
Party	Candidate	Votes	%
Democratic	Zach Brown (incumbent)	3,077	63.12%
Republican	Joey Chester	1,798	36.88%
Total votes		4,875	100%
Democratic hold			

==== District 64 ====
Incumbent Republican Kerry White had represented the 64th district since 2013.

Montana House of Representatives 64th district general election, 2018
Party	Candidate	Votes	%
Republican	Kerry White (incumbent)	3,607	53.06%
Democratic	Denise Albrecht	3,191	46.94%
Total votes		6,798	100%
Republican hold			

==== District 65 ====
Incumbent Republican Jon Knokey had represented the 65th district since 2017. Knokey ran for re-election, but later withdrew. Former representative Christopher Pope won the open seat.

Montana House of Representatives 65th district general election, 2018
Party	Candidate	Votes	%
Democratic	Christopher Pope	4,024	58.04%
Republican	Jane Gillette	2,909	41.96%
Total votes		6,933	100%
Democratic gain from Republican			

==== District 66 ====
Incumbent Democrat Denise Hayman had represented the 66th district since 2015.

Montana House of Representatives 66th district general election, 2018
Party	Candidate	Votes	%
Democratic	Denise Hayman (incumbent)	4,382	100%
Total votes		4,382	100%
Democratic hold			

==== District 67 ====
Incumbent Republican Tom Burnett had represented the 67th district since 2015.

Montana House of Representatives 67th district general election, 2018
Party	Candidate	Votes	%
Republican	Tom Burnett (incumbent)	2,682	54.49%
Democratic	Kristine Menicucci	2,240	45.51%
Total votes		4,922	100%
Republican hold			

==== District 68 ====
Incumbent Republican Bruce Grubbs had represented the 68th district since 2017.

Montana House of Representatives 68th district general election, 2018
Party	Candidate	Votes	%
Republican	Bruce Grubbs (incumbent)	3,386	67.41%
Democratic	Seth Mangini	1,637	32.59%
Total votes		5,023	100%
Republican hold			

==== District 69 ====
Incumbent Republican Walt Sales had represented the 69th district since 2017.

Montana House of Representatives 69th district general election, 2018
Party	Candidate	Votes	%
Republican	Walt Sales (incumbent)	4,333	80.33%
Libertarian	Joshua-Luke O'Connor	1,061	19.67%
Total votes		5,394	100%
Republican hold			

==== District 70 ====
Incumbent Republican Kelly Flynn had represented the 70th District and its predecessors since 2011. Flynn was term-limited and could not seek re-election.

Montana House of Representatives 70th district general election, 2018
Party	Candidate	Votes	%
Republican	Julie Dooling	4,693	81.75%
Libertarian	Chris Richards	1,048	18.25%
Total votes		5,741	100%
Republican hold			

==== District 71 ====
Incumbent Republican Ray Shaw had represented the 71st district since 2013.

Montana House of Representatives 71st district general election, 2018
Party	Candidate	Votes	%
Republican	Ray Shaw (incumbent)	3,662	57.90%
Democratic	Jay A. Frederick	1,819	28.76%
Libertarian	Michael White	844	13.34%
Total votes		6,325	100%
Republican hold			

==== District 72 ====
Incumbent Republican Tom Welch had represented the 72nd district since 2017.

Montana House of Representatives 72nd district general election, 2018
Party	Candidate	Votes	%
Republican	Tom Welch (incumbent)	4,132	77.25%
Democratic	Bill Dwyer	1,217	22.75%
Total votes		5,349	100%
Republican hold			

==== District 73 ====
Incumbent Democrat Jim Keane had represented the 73rd district since 2017.

Montana House of Representatives 73rd district general election, 2018
Party	Candidate	Votes	%
Democratic	Jim Keane (incumbent)	3,622	100%
Total votes		3,622	100%
Democratic hold			

==== District 74 ====
Incumbent Democrat Amanda Curtis had represented the 74th district since 2017. Curtis did not seek re-election.

Montana House of Representatives 74th district general election, 2018
Party	Candidate	Votes	%
Democratic	Derek Harvey	3,018	100%
Total votes		3,018	100%
Democratic hold			

==== District 75 ====
Incumbent Republican Kirk Wagoner had represented the 75th district since 2013. Wagoner did not seek re-election.

Montana House of Representatives 75th district general election, 2018
Party	Candidate	Votes	%
Republican	Greg DeVries	3,344	57.39%
Democratic	J. Bryher Herak	2,483	42.61%
Total votes		5,827	100%
Republican hold			

==== District 76 ====
Incumbent Democrat Ryan Lynch had represented the 76th district since 2013.

Montana House of Representatives 76th district general election, 2018
Party	Candidate	Votes	%
Democratic	Ryan Lynch (incumbent)	4,570	100%
Total votes		4,570	100%
Democratic hold			

==== District 77 ====
Incumbent Democrat Kathy Swanson had represented the 79th district since 2011. Swanson was term-limited and could not seek re-election.

Montana House of Representatives 77th district general election, 2018
Party	Candidate	Votes	%
Democratic	Mark Sweeney	2,980	59.56%
Republican	Heather Blom	1,789	35.76%
Libertarian	Richard (Dick) Motta	234	4.68%
Total votes		5,003	100%
Democratic hold			

==== District 78 ====
Incumbent Democrat Gordon Pierson had represented the 78th District and its predecessors since 2013.

Montana House of Representatives 78th district general election, 2018
Party	Candidate	Votes	%
Democratic	Gordon Pierson (incumbent)	2,598	100%
Total votes		2,598	100%
Democratic hold			

==== District 79 ====
Incumbent Democrat Minority Leader Jenny Eck had represented the 79th district since 2013. Eck initially ran for re-election, but later withdrew.

Montana House of Representatives 79th district general election, 2018
Party	Candidate	Votes	%
Democratic	Robert Farris-Olsen	4,149	100%
Total votes		4,149	100%
Democratic hold			

==== District 80 ====
Incumbent Republican Becky Beard had represented the 80th district since 2017.

Montana House of Representatives 80th district general election, 2018
Party	Candidate	Votes	%
Republican	Becky Beard (incumbent)	4,200	71.39%
Democratic	Catherine Scott	1,683	28.61%
Total votes		5,883	100%
Republican hold			

=== Districts 81–100 ===
==== District 81 ====
Incumbent Democrat Janet Ellis had represented the 81st district since 2015. Ellis ran successfully for a seat in the Montana Senate. State Senator Mary Cafero won the open seat.

Montana House of Representatives 81st district general election, 2018
Party	Candidate	Votes	%
Democratic	Mary Caferro	3,794	100%
Total votes		3,794	100%
Democratic hold			

==== District 82 ====
Incumbent Democrat Moffie Funk had represented the 82nd district since 2015.

Montana House of Representatives 82nd district general election, 2018
Party	Candidate	Votes	%
Democratic	Moffie Funk (incumbent)	3,892	100%
Total votes		3,892	100%
Democratic hold			

==== District 83 ====
Incumbent Democrat Kim Abbott had represented the 83rd district since 2017.

Montana House of Representatives 83rd district general election, 2018
Party	Candidate	Votes	%
Democratic	Kim Abbott (incumbent)	3,454	100%
Total votes		3,454	100%
Democratic hold			

==== District 84 ====
Incumbent Democrat Mary Ann Dunwell had represented the 84th district since 2015.

Montana House of Representatives 84th district general election, 2018
Party	Candidate	Votes	%
Democratic	Mary Ann Dunwell (incumbent)	3,638	100%
Total votes		3,638	100%
Democratic hold			

==== District 85 ====
Incumbent Republican Theresa Manzella had represented the 85th district since 2015.

Montana House of Representatives 85th district general election, 2018
Party	Candidate	Votes	%
Republican	Theresa Manzella (incumbent)	4,170	69.76%
Democratic	Laura Jackson	1,808	30.24%
Total votes		5,978	100%
Republican hold			

==== District 86 ====
Incumbent Republican Majority Leader Ron Ehli had represented the 86th district since 2011. Ehli was term-limited and could not seek re-election.

Montana House of Representatives 86th district general election, 2018
Party	Candidate	Votes	%
Republican	David Bedey	3,502	64.02%
Democratic	Jason F. Nickisch	1,968	35.98%
Total votes		5,470	100%
Republican hold			

==== District 87 ====
Incumbent Republican Nancy Ballance had represented the 87th district since 2013.

Montana House of Representatives 87th district general election, 2018
Party	Candidate	Votes	%
Republican	Nancy Ballance (incumbent)	4,371	100%
Total votes		4,371	100%
Republican hold			

==== District 88 ====
Incumbent Republican Edward Greef had represented the 88th District and its predecessors since 2011. Greef was term-limited and could not seek re-election.

Montana House of Representatives 88th district general election, 2018
Party	Candidate	Votes	%
Republican	Sharon Greef	3,669	63.15%
Democratic	Margaret Gorski	2,141	36.85%
Total votes		5,810	100%
Republican hold			

==== District 89 ====
Incumbent Democrat Dave Severson had represented the 89th district since his appointment in 2018. Severson did not seek re-election.

Montana House of Representatives 89th district general election, 2018
Party	Candidate	Votes	%
Democratic	Katie Sullivan	3,121	62.42%
Republican	David (Doc) Moore	1,879	37.58%
Total votes		5,000	100%
Democratic hold			

==== District 90 ====
Incumbent Democrat Ellie Boldman had represented the 90th District and its predecessors since 2011. Boldman was term-limited and could not seek re-election.

Montana House of Representatives 90th district general election, 2018
Party	Candidate	Votes	%
Democratic	Marilyn Marler	3,575	67.85%
Republican	Nick Knowles	1,694	32.15%
Total votes		5,269	100%
Democratic hold			

==== District 91 ====
Incumbent Democrat Bryce Bennett had represented the 91st district since 2015. Bennett successfully ran for a seat in the Montana Senate.

Montana House of Representatives 91st district general election, 2018
Party	Candidate	Votes	%
Democratic	Connie Keogh	5,285	84.12%
Republican	Aldo Sardot	998	15.88%
Total votes		6,283	100%
Democratic hold			

==== District 92 ====
Incumbent Republican Mike Hopkins had represented the 92nd district since 2017.

Montana House of Representatives 92nd district general election, 2018
Party	Candidate	Votes	%
Republican	Mike Hopkins (incumbent)	2,667	52.69%
Democratic	Lee Bridges	2,395	47.31%
Total votes		5,062	100%
Republican hold			

==== District 93 ====
Incumbent Democrat John Fleming had represented the 93rd district since 2017. Fleming did not seek re-election.

Montana House of Representatives 93rd district general election, 2018
Party	Candidate	Votes	%
Republican	Joe Read	2,421	55.87%
Democratic	Eldena N. Bear Don't Walk	1,912	44.13%
Total votes		4,333	100%
Republican gain from Democratic			

==== District 94 ====
Incumbent Democrat Kimberly Dudik had represented the 94th District and its predecessors since 2013.

Montana House of Representatives 94th district general election, 2018
Party	Candidate	Votes	%
Democratic	Kimberly Dudik (incumbent)	2,922	57.10%
Republican	Dean Rehbein	2,195	42.90%
Total votes		5,117	100%
Democratic hold			

==== District 95 ====
Incumbent Democrat Shane Morigeau had represented the 95th district since 2017.

Montana House of Representatives 95th district general election, 2018
Party	Candidate	Votes	%
Democratic	Shane Morigeau (incumbent)	3,608	77.26%
Republican	Donald Kenck	1,062	22.74%
Total votes		4,670	100%
Democratic hold			

==== District 96 ====
Incumbent Republican Adam Hertz had represented the 96th district since 2017. Hertz lost re-election to Democrat Tom Winter.

Montana House of Representatives 96th district general election, 2018
Party	Candidate	Votes	%
Democratic	Tom Winter	2,869	50.35%
Republican	Adam Hertz (incumbent)	2,829	49.65%
Total votes		5,698	100%
Democratic gain from Republican			

==== District 97 ====
Incumbent Republican Brad Tschida had represented the 97th district since 2015.

Montana House of Representatives 97th district general election, 2018
Party	Candidate	Votes	%
Republican	Brad Tschida (incumbent)	3,125	58.20%
Democratic	Patrick Maloney	2,244	41.80%
Total votes		5,369	100%
Republican hold			

==== District 98 ====
Incumbent Democrat Willis Curdy had represented the 98th district since 2015.

Montana House of Representatives 98th district general election, 2018
Party	Candidate	Votes	%
Democratic	Willis Curdy (incumbent)	3,210	60.32%
Republican	Jim Sadler	1,931	36.28%
Libertarian	Jessuah Bardgett	181	3.40%
Total votes		5,322	100%
Democratic hold			

==== District 99 ====
Incumbent Democrat Marilyn Ryan had represented the 99th district since 2017.

Montana House of Representatives 99th district general election, 2018
Party	Candidate	Votes	%
Democratic	Marilyn Ryan (incumbent)	3,357	60.96%
Republican	Randy Tschida	2,150	39.04%
Total votes		5,507	100%
Democratic hold			

==== District 100 ====
Incumbent Democrat Andrea Olsen had represented the 100th district since 2015.

Montana House of Representatives 100th district general election, 2018
Party	Candidate	Votes	%
Democratic	Andrea Olsen (incumbent)	5,104	100%
Total votes		5,104	100%
Democratic hold			
