= LGBTQ rights in Montana =

- Montana (US)
- Legal status: Legal since 1997
- Gender identity: Transgender people no longer allowed to change legal gender since 2022
- Discrimination protections: Sexual orientation and gender identity protected in employment

Family rights
- Recognition of relationships: Same-sex marriage since 2014
- Adoption: Same-sex couples allowed to adopt

Lesbian, gay, bisexual, transgender, and queer (LGBTQ) people in the U.S. state of Montana may face some legal challenges not experienced by non-LGBTQ residents. Same-sex sexual activity has been legal in Montana since 1997, and the state's enjoined sodomy law was legislatively repealed in 2013. Same-sex couples and families headed by same-sex couples are eligible for all of the protections available to opposite-sex married couples, as same-sex marriage has been recognized since November 2014.

State statutes do not directly address discrimination on the basis of sexual orientation and gender identity. The state's courts have struck down several bills targeting transgender people, ruling that discrimination against trans people was inherently a form of sex discrimination and therefore violated the equal protection clauses of the state constitution. The federal protections against employment discrimination based on sexual orientation or gender identity, established in 2020 by several landmark cases, apply in Montana. A number of cities also provide protections in housing and public accommodations.

== History ==
Among Native Americans, perceptions towards gender and sexuality were very different from that of the Western world. Among the Blackfeet people, the a'yai-kik-ahsi (literally acts like a woman) are male-bodied individuals who behave, dress, and live as women. Likewise, female-bodied individuals who act and behave as men are known as awau-katsik-saki (literally warrior woman) or ninauh-oskiti-pahpyaki (literally manly-hearted woman). The Gros Ventre, the Cheyenne, the Assiniboine and the Crow refer to male-to-female individuals as athuth, he'émáné'e, wįktą and bate (or badé), respectively, whereas female-to-male people are known as hetanémáné'e among the Cheyenne. The bate would perform domestic tasks (such as cooking and needlework), dress as women and even marry. Osh-Tisch, one of the most famous Crow bate, and others were forced by an American agent in the 1890s to wear male clothes and perform manual labor, to which the other Crows protested "saying it was against [their] nature".

The Montana Territory adopted its first criminal code in 1865. It included a provision prohibiting sodomy ("crime against nature") with five years' to life imprisonment. In 1878, Montana saw one of the earliest recorded sodomy cases in the United States; in Territory v. Mahaffey, a man was convicted of sexual relations with a 14-year-old boy. In 1915, the Montana Supreme Court ruled that fellatio (oral sex), whether heterosexual or homosexual, was also criminal. Over the years, the courts convicted multiple people of sodomy, even between consenting adults.

In 1972, the Montana Legislature rejected a proposal that read "private sexual acts between consenting adults do not constitute a crime", by a 69–16 vote. In 1973, a new criminal code was enacted. Sodomy was renamed "deviate sexual conduct", made applicable only to people of the same sex (thus legalizing heterosexual oral and anal sex), and punishable by up to ten years' imprisonment and a possible fine of 50,000 dollars. A 1989 sex offender registration law further required anyone convicted of sodomy to register with the local chief of police and report any change in address.

== Legality of same-sex sexual activity ==
Montana revised its Criminal Code in 1973 and retained its anti-sodomy statute. In 1991, the Montana Legislature made its rape and sexual assault laws gender-neutral, providing for a uniform penalty for both heterosexual and homosexual rape (minimum two years' imprisonment). Attempts to repeal the state's sodomy law failed in 1993 and 1995. In 1997, the Montana Supreme Court held in Gryczan v. State that the state law prohibiting same-sex sexual contact between consenting adults was unconstitutional. Justice James C. Nelson, writing for the 6–1 majority, stated:

It cannot seriously be argued that Respondents do not have a subjective or actual expectation of privacy in their sexual activities. With few exceptions not at issue here, all adults regardless of gender, fully and properly expect that their consensual sexual activities will not be subject to the prying eyes of others or to governmental snooping and regulation. Quite simply, consenting adults expect that neither the state nor their neighbors will be co-habitants of their bedrooms.

Attempts to repeal the statute failed in 1999, 2001 and 2011.

On February 20, 2013, the Montana State Senate passed a bill, by a vote of 38 to 11 vote, that repealed part of the sodomy statute dealing with consenting adults. On April 10, 2013, the Montana House of Representatives passed the bill by a vote of 64 to 35. Governor Steve Bullock signed the legislation into law on April 18.

== Recognition of same-sex relationships ==
A federal court ruled the state's ban on same-sex marriage unconstitutional on November 19, 2014. Judge Brian Morris issued an injunction against the state's enforcement of its ban that took effect immediately. The state's appeal to the Ninth Circuit Court of Appeals was mooted when the U.S. Supreme Court ruled in Obergefell v. Hodges on June 26, 2015, that Ohio's ban on same-sex marriage is unconstitutional, striking down every remaining state ban.

Montana voters had adopted a constitutional amendment in November 2004 that defined marriage as the union of a man and a woman. Similar restrictions appear in the state statutes.

The Montana Supreme Court recognized a common law same-sex marriage as retroactively valid in Adami v. Nelson on December 10, 2019.

== Adoption and parenting ==
Montana permits adoption by individuals, and there are no explicit prohibitions on adoption by same-sex couples or on second-parent adoption. Lesbian couples have access to assisted reproduction services, such as in vitro fertilization. State law recognizes the non-genetic, non-gestational mother as a legal parent to a child born via donor insemination, but only if the parents are married.

Montana law does not regulate the practice of surrogacy, but courts are generally favorable to the process. Generally, courts will grant pre-birth parentage orders to married or unmarried couples and individuals when there is a genetic relationship to the child. The availability of parentage orders to individuals and couples with no genetic link to a child is more often determined on a case-by-case basis. Couples using the traditional surrogacy process may require a post-birth hearing or adoption to obtain legal rights to their child.

In Kulstad v. Maniaci, Barbara Maniaci refused to allow Michelle Kulstad to see the children they had raised together and who had legally been adopted only by Maniaci, but the trial court sided with Kulstad and granted her parental rights. The Montana Supreme Court affirmed this ruling 6–1 on October 7, 2009, setting precedent allowing for future stepparent adoptions by same-sex couples statewide.

== Discrimination protections ==
Map of Montana counties and cities that had sexual orientation and/or gender identity anti–employment discrimination ordinances prior to Bostock Sexual orientation and gender identity with anti–employment discrimination ordinance Sexual orientation and gender identity in public employment No anti-discrimination ordinance¹ ¹Since 2020 as a result of Bostock, discrimination on account of sexual orientation or gender identity in public and private employment is outlawed throughout the state. Discrimination against state employees by reason of their sexual orientation has been illegal since 2000, and gender identity since 2016.

Montana, by executive order, prohibits discrimination on the bias of sexual orientation and gender identity in state employment and state (sub)contractors. In 2000, Governor Marc Racicot first issued state personnel rules prohibiting discrimination and harassment on the basis of sexual orientation with respect to employment by state government. In November 2008, Governor Brian Schweitzer issued Executive Order No. 41-2008, broadening the government non-discrimination provisions. In January 2016, Governor Steve Bullock expanded the protections to cover gender identity and expanded it to state contractors and subcontractors.

On February 23, 2011, the Montana House of Representatives passed, by a 62–37 vote, a bill that would have prohibited local municipalities from adopting anti-discrimination categories not protected in the state law. The bill died in the Montana State Senate's Standing Committee on April 28, 2011.

The following Montana jurisdictions have ordinances prohibiting discrimination on the basis of sexual orientation and gender identity in both public and private employment, housing and public accommodations: Bozeman, Butte-Silver Bow County, Helena, Missoula, and Whitefish. Missoula County prohibits discrimination against county employees only.

In April 2021, Governor Greg Gianforte signed legislation into law granting people the right to discriminate if their religious beliefs are "substantially burdened". The bill is widely viewed as allowing a "license to discriminate" against LGBTQ people.

=== Bostock v. Clayton County ===
On June 15, 2020, the U.S. Supreme Court ruled in Bostock v. Clayton County, consolidated with Altitude Express, Inc. v. Zarda, and R.G. & G.R. Harris Funeral Homes Inc. v. Equal Employment Opportunity Commission that discrimination in the workplace on the basis of sexual orientation or gender identity is discrimination on the basis of sex, and Title VII therefore protects LGBT employees from discrimination.

== Hate crime law ==
Montana's hate crime statutes do not include sexual orientation or gender identity as protected grounds. Hate crimes committed on the basis of the victim's sexual orientation or gender identity can be prosecuted in federal courts under the Matthew Shepard and James Byrd Jr. Hate Crimes Prevention Act, which was signed into law in October 2009 by President Barack Obama.

== Flag law ==
In May 2025, the state passed HB 819, a "neutrality" law that prohibits the official government display of flags that "represent a political party, race, sexual orientation, gender or political ideology". A "flag" is defined as a physical or digital installation on a "flagpole, building, wall, vehicle, or other structure", and exempts official governmental, territorial, and school flags, "official historical flags" (such as the Gadsden flag), and flags that represent law enforcement (such as the thin blue line).

The law has been interpreted as to prohibit the official display of Pride flags by governments and schools. As a loophole in the law, the city of Missoula—which had not yet adopted a municipal flag—passed a resolution to make a rainbow pride flag an official flag of the city—thus authorizing its display. Due to the wording of the bill, this effectively exempts the rainbow flag state-wide.

== Transgender rights ==
=== Recognition of gender identity ===
In May 2023, Senate Bill 458 was signed into law by Governor Greg Gianforte; the bill codified a biological definition of "sex" in state law as being an immutable male-female binary that is determined at birth and cannot be changed. In February 2025, following a suit raised by a group of transgender and intersex residents, SB 458 was struck down by District Judge Leslie Halligan as being in violation of the equal protection clauses of the Constitution of Montana. Halligan ruled that the bill "leaves a gap in protection against sex discrimination for individuals whose gender identities do not align with their biological sex, as such interest would be permitting sex discrimination towards a minority population, in violation of the policy of the State of Montana."

In March 2026, Senate Bill 437 was signed into law, which codifies biological definitions of "gender", "male", "female", "man", "woman", "mother", and "father" based on "primary sexual anatomy" into state law. The bill mandates that the word "gender" be interpreted only as a synonym for "sex" for legislative purposes, and prohibits "gender identity" from being used as a synonym or substitute for sex or gender. Representative Zooey Zephyr, who is openly trans, criticized the bill for effectively erasing recognition of transgender, intersex, and two-spirit people from state law, and argued that it was "essentially the same" as SB 458. The bill had been passed during the previous legislative session in 2025, but its signing had been delayed due to the litigation surrounding Senate Bill 458. In April 2026, the plaintiffs requested that SB 437 be added to the ongoing litigation, arguing that it was unconstitutional because it was fundamentally identical to SB 458.

=== Documents ===
On September 9, 2022, Montana passed a law that prohibits transgender people from changing "identification of sex on birth certificates" unless they provide proof of a data entry error or DNA test result. On September 15, a judge blocked Montana from enforcing this law, and a week later, the state Department of Public Health and Human Services agreed to comply with the judge's order. On February 22, 2023, a bill was introduced that would prohibit gender marker changes on all identity documents. On May 19, the governor signed it. In December 2024, District Judge Mike Menahan issued an injunction blocking the law.

In April 2024, two trans women sued after they were unable to update the gender marker on their driver's licenses and birth certificates. On December 16, District Judge Mike Menahan issued a preliminary decision to block enforcement of the laws until the case was decided at trial; he cited that the state constitution provides protection against discrimination on the basis of sex, that the judiciary is the "final interpreter" of the constitution, and that "if the challenged state actions discriminate against transgender individuals on the basis of their transgender status, they also necessarily discriminate on the basis of sex". On April 15, 2026, the Montana Supreme Court upheld the lower court's opinion, with Justice Laurie McKinnon writing that "our Montana Constitution requires the state to treat individuals with dignity even as it exercises its broad police powers."

Montana has had various rules in the past. Until 2017, Montana required sex reassignment surgery and clinical treatment before updating a person's birth certificate. Then, in December 2017, Montana removed the requirement for surgery. It began allowing transgender individuals to change the gender marker on their birth certificate by submitting to the Department of Public Health and Human Services a "Correction Affidavit" signed by the applicant, a completed "Gender Designation Form" and a certified copy of a court order indicating that the gender has been changed. The Motor Vehicle Division of the Department of Justice would change the sex designation on a driver's license and state ID card upon receipt of a letter from a doctor confirming that the applicant is in the process or has completed the process of changing gender.

In April 2021, the Montana Legislature passed a bill to reintroduce the requirement for "surgical procedures" and obtain a court order. Governor Greg Gianforte signed the bill into law effective immediately. The ACLU sued in federal and state courts in July 2021, claiming that the term "surgical procedure" was vague and that the rule put transgender individuals at risk of harassment, discrimination and violence. In April 2022, a federal judge agreed that the bill had "no clear legal definitions of what sexual reassignment surgery actually means" and blocked its enforcement. Nonetheless, in May 2022, the Department of Public Health and Human Services adopted a "temporary emergency rule" banning birth certificate updates, and the rule was announced as permanent several months later.

=== Bathrooms ===
In 2018, the Montana Family Foundation sought to require transgender people to use public bathrooms corresponding to the gender on their birth certificate, but their initiative failed to collect enough signatures to appear on the November ballot.

In 2024, the Montana House voted on whether to forbid trans people from using the bathroom in the Montana State Capitol that aligns with their gender. This would have affected Representative Zooey Zephyr. On December 3, the House voted down the proposal, with three Republicans joining Democrats in voting against it.

In February 2025, the state legislature passed HB 121, which would require bathrooms, locker rooms, and sleeping areas in publicly-funded facilities to be segregated based on biological sex assigned at birth. The ACLU of Montana immediately filed a lawsuit against the bill; on April 2, 2025, District Court Judge Shane Vannatta issued a temporary restraining order, ruling that the bill "is motivated by animus and supported by no evidence that its restrictions advance its purported purpose to protect women's safety and privacy."

=== Health care access ===
On April 28, 2023, Governor Gianforte signed SB 99, a bill prohibiting gender affirming care for trans minors. The bill was believed to be the most comprehensive prohibition against gender-affirming healthcare that has ever existed anywhere in the United States. A lawsuit was filed against SB 99 by the ACLU of Montana and Lambda Legal. On September 27, shortly before the bill was to take effect District Judge Jason Marks issued a preliminary injunction to temporarily block it. Citing the U.S. Supreme Court case of Bostock v. Clayton County, he ruled that discriminating against a person for being transgender inherently constituted discrimination based on sex. He further wrote that the law "does not serve its purported compelling interest of protecting minors and shielding them from pressure" and that it serves "no compelling governmental interest".

On December 11, 2024, the Montana Supreme Court ruled that the preliminary injunction could stand, based on the plaintiffs' claim of a right to privacy. They sent it back to district court for trial. Justice Laurie McKinnon added (with Justice Ingrid Gustafson concurring) that the plaintiffs' "equal protection claim should likewise be addressed". McKinnon said that Montana's right to privacy is not the only relevant consideration; the ban is also "fundamentally about the nature of sex and suspect class discrimination as it applies in the equal protection context." She added that "this Court should separately and additionally hold that transgender status is a suspect class", i.e., a minority group, discrimination against whom should be taken seriously by the court.

On May 14, 2025, the bill was permanently struck down by Judge Marks. He ruled that the state was "unable to clearly and convincingly establish that a bona fide health risk exists. They have not put forth any evidence showing major medical organizations in the United States have changed their stance on gender-affirming medical care."

=== Sports ===
The Montana Legislature passed a law in April 2021 banning transgender athletes from participating in public school sports. An amendment stated it would depend on Montana's continued federal funding for education. Governor Gianforte signed the bill the following month. In September 2022, District Judge Rienne McElyea struck down the law and two unrelated bills as unconstitutional on administrative grounds, citing that they infringed upon the authority of the Regents of the Montana University System as dictated by the state constitution.

=== Censure of Zooey Zephyr ===
On April 18, 2023, the first openly trans state representative in the state of Montana, Zooey Zephyr, admonished those who supported Senate Bill 99 to prohibit gender-affirming medical and surgical care for transgender minors. She first commented, "...If you are forcing a trans child to go through puberty when they are trans, that is tantamount to torture, and this body should be ashamed." When this remark triggered an objection from Republican majority leader Sue Vinton, Zephyr replied, "The only thing I will say is if you vote 'yes' on this bill and 'yes' on these amendments, I hope the next time there's an invocation when you bow your heads in prayer, you see the blood on your hands." This prompted backlash from House Republicans. The Montana Freedom Caucus issued a statement misgendering Zephyr and calling for her censure. Zephyr stood by her words, and House Minority Leader Kim Abbott defended her, describing the statement as "blatantly disrespectful and the farthest thing imaginable from the 'commitment to civil discourse' that these letter writers demand". Thereafter, Speaker Matt Regier refused to let Zephyr speak on any bills despite no censure having taken place.

On April 24, about 100 people gathered at a rally in support of Zephyr, prompting heavy police presence. That afternoon, when Zephyr was again denied speaking privileges, prompting all Democratic lawmakers to stand in protest, all but two Republican members of the chamber's supermajority again voted to uphold Regier's ruling. At that point, protesters in the House Gallery began chanting, "let her speak," resulting in a half-hour delay in proceedings as riot police were brought in to clear the gallery. Most Democratic legislators remained in the House chambers, mostly in the wings, but Republican lawmakers evacuated the room. Zephyr remained at her desk on the floor, silently holding aloft a microphone. Seven people were arrested, and after booking were released without needing to post bail.

On April 26, a hearing was held to vote on a proposal to sanction Zephyr's actions during the protest on April 24. After a speech by Zephyr and a brief debate limited to three speakers on each side, the House voted 68–32 along party lines to bar Zephyr from the House floor, gallery, and antechamber until the adjournment of the 2023 session the first week of May. She was allowed the option to vote remotely for the remainder of the session.

== Sex education parental opt-in ==
In May 2021, the Montana Legislature and Governor Greg Gianforte passed, signed and approved a law that requires a "parental opt-in" for K-12 school students within Montana before sex education can be taught in classrooms.

== Drag queen bans ==
In May 2023, HB 359 was passed along party lines by the state legislature, which prohibits "sexually oriented or obscene performance[s]" in public spaces where minors may be present, and explicitly prohibits "drag story hours" from being held at publicly-funded schools and libraries. The bill was considered one of the strongest anti-drag laws so far within the United States, as it defines both drag kings and queens, and does not contain legal loopholes (such as the "dressing up as drag of a sexual nature done by individuals", within Tennessee and Florida as examples). Shortly after the bill was signed, a local library in Butte-Silver Bow county cancelled a reading given by a transgender woman, citing the law.

In July 2023, immediately prior to Big Sky Pride, District Court Judge Brian Morris issued a temporary restraining order blocking enforcement of HB 359, considering its text to be "vague and overbroad" as a potential violation of the First Amendment, and that it created a "risk of disproportionate enforcement against trans, Two-Spirit, and gender nonconforming people". The restraining order was extended in October 2024;

In March 2025, HB 675—a bill that would have defined any drag performance as being inherently sexual, and would have allowed a private right of action for parents to sue if their children had experienced "psychological, emotional, economic, and physical harm" from attending a drag performance—was defeated in the House. 13 state Republicans broke rank and joined Democrats in opposing the bill.

== Public opinion ==
A 2022 Public Religion Research Institute (PRRI) opinion poll found that 70% of Montana residents supported same-sex marriage, while 29% opposed it and 1% were unsure. Additionally, 72% supported an anti-discrimination law covering sexual orientation and gender identity. 29% were opposed.

== Summary table ==
| Same-sex sexual activity legal | Yes (Since 1997; codified in 2013) |
| Equal age of consent | Yes (Since 1997; codified in 2013) |
| Anti-discrimination laws in employment | Yes (Since 2020, under Bostock v. Clayton County) |
| Anti-discrimination laws in housing | No / Yes (In some cities and counties) |
| Anti-discrimination laws in public accommodations | No / Yes (In some cities and counties) |
| Same-sex marriages | Yes / No (Since 2014, disputed in the Crow, Northern Cheyenne and Fort Belknap reservations) |
| Stepchild and joint adoption by same-sex couples | Yes |
| Lesbian, gay and bisexual people allowed to serve openly in the military | Yes (Since 2011) |
| Transgender people allowed to serve openly in the military | Yes (Since 2021) |
| Intersex people allowed to serve openly in the military | (Current DoD policy bans "hermaphrodites" from serving or enlisting in the military) |
| Conversion therapy banned on minors | No |
| Gay panic defense banned | No |
| Right to change legal sex on a birth certificate or driver's license | Yes (Since 2024, under court order) |
| Access to IVF for lesbian couples | Yes |
| Surrogacy arrangements for gay male couples | Yes |
| MSMs allowed to donate blood | Yes (Since 2023, on the condition of being monogamous - under FDA regulations) |
