= Hollandsworth =

Hollandsworth is a surname. Notable people with the surname include:

- James G. Hollandsworth (1944–2010), American psychologist, professor, and historian
- Roy Hollandsworth (born 1942), American politician
- Skip Hollandsworth (born 1957), American journalist
- Todd Hollandsworth (born 1973), American baseball player
