= Erin Reed (disambiguation) =

Erin Reed is an American journalist and transgender activist.

Erin Reed may also refer to:

- Erin Reed, figure skater in the 2007 U.S. Figure Skating Championships
- Erin Reed, actress in Sister Kate (TV series)
