= Peggy Webb =

Peggy Webb may refer to:

- Peggy Webb (writer)
- Peggy Webb (politician)
