= Zooey Zephyr =

American politician (born 1988)

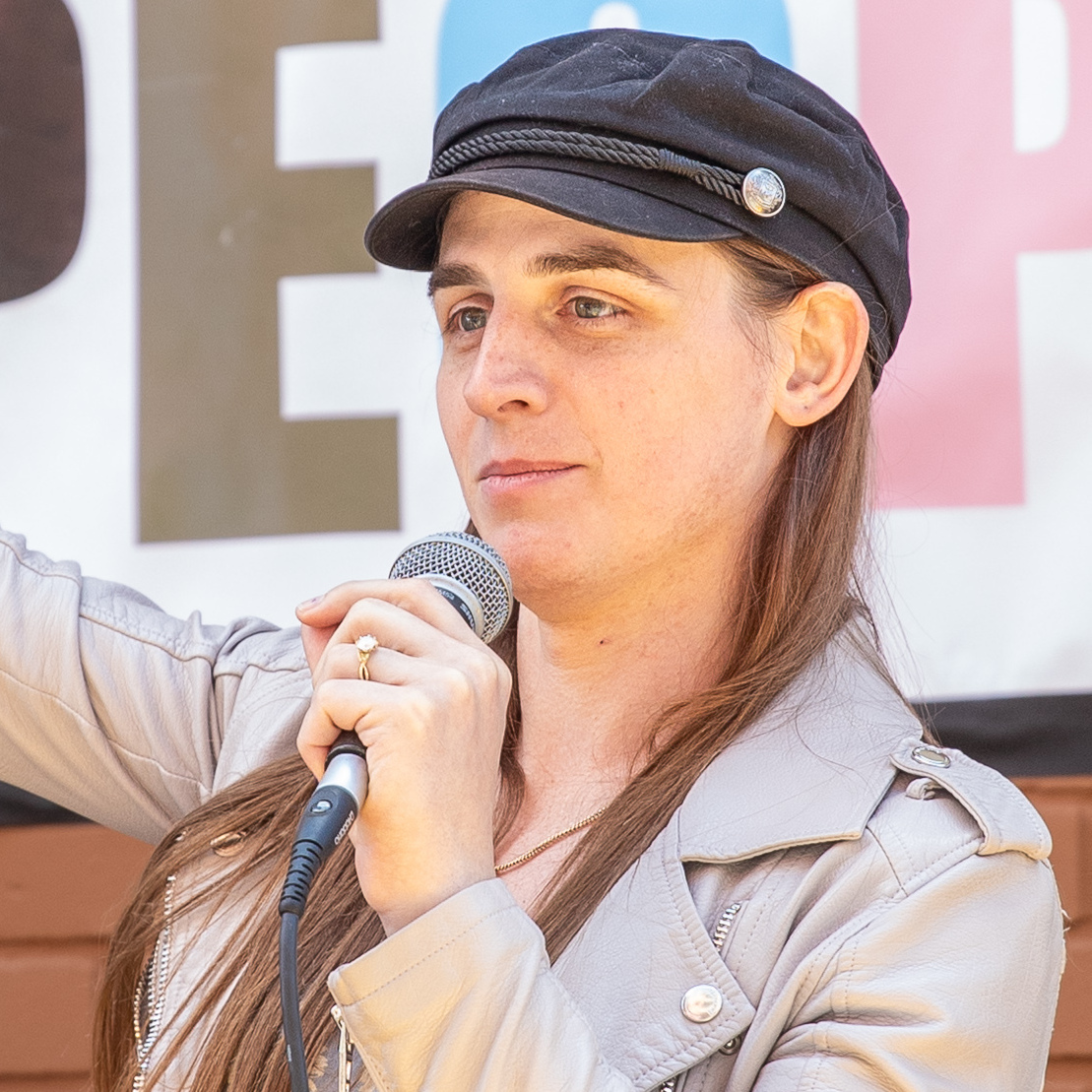
- Zephyr in 2023

Member of the Montana House of Representatives
- Incumbent
- Assumed office January 2, 2023
- Preceded by: Andrea Olsen
- Constituency: 100th district (2023–2025); 95th district (2025–present)

Personal details
- Born: August 29, 1988 (age 38) Billings, Montana, U.S.
- Party: Democratic
- Spouse: Erin Reed (m. 2024)
- Education: University of Washington (BA); University of Montana (MA)
- Occupation: University administrator

Zooey Simone Zephyr (born August 29, 1988) is an American politician and university administrator who represents Missoula in the 95th district in the Montana House of Representatives. A member of the Democratic Party, she was elected in the 2022 election to represent the 100th district in the Montana House of Representatives, making her the first openly transgender person to be elected to the Montana Legislature. Sworn in as a representative on January 2, 2023, in April 2023, Zephyr was banned from the House floor after speaking out against multiple anti-LGBT bills and criticizing their supporters. In November 2024, Zephyr won re-election to the House in the 95th district, which she ran in due to redistricting.

Zephyr is featured in the documentary film Seat 31: Zooey Zephyr directed by Kimberly Reed, which was shortlisted for the 2025 Academy Awards.

== Early life and education ==
Zephyr was born in Billings, Montana. She moved with her parents to Seattle at the age of 10. She competed in wrestling during her childhood and teenage years.

Zephyr graduated from the University of Washington in 2011 with a dual Bachelor of Arts in Business Administration and Creative Writing. She subsequently returned to her home state to pursue graduate studies at the University of Montana (UM), earning master's degrees in creative writing and literary criticism. She joined the university's Biology department and then the Office of the Provost, where she worked as a Program Manager overseeing the university's curricula.

Under the username Cazcom, Zephyr was a competitive Super Smash Bros. video game player, particularly in Project M tournaments. In May 2014, she made the top 8 at the Northwest Majors IV in Des Moines, Washington.

Zephyr came out as transgender in 2018. She chose as her name, Zooey, meaning "life", and Zephyr, as she wanted to be "a gentle breeze". Her middle name, Simone, is a tribute to her paternal grandmother. A 2023 Out profile described her as a bisexual trans woman.

== Career ==
Zephyr's rise as an activist began in 2020, when she testified before the Montana state legislature in defense of LGBT rights and met with Republican Governor Greg Gianforte. Having watched in frustration as bills limiting transgender rights, such as those making it difficult for transgender people to update birth certificates, passed by single-vote margins, Zephyr came to believe that she needed to "get into the room where the laws are being written," leading her to decide to run for a seat in the Montana House of Representatives in the 2022 midterm elections.

House District 100—of which she represented from 2023 through 2025—is one of the most Democratic-leaning districts in Montana. The seat was previously held by Andrea Olsen, who vacated the seat to run for state senate. Zephyr defeated Dave Severson in the Democratic primary on June 7, 2022. Upon defeating Republican opponent Sean Patrick McCoy that November, Zephyr became the first trans woman elected to the Montana legislature alongside SJ Howell, the first non-binary person elected to the legislature. Zephyr assumed office in January 2023. On April 28, 2023, she announced she would seek re-election in 2024. Due to redistricting, she ran in the 95th district, while the incumbent ran for the 100th district.

In an interview with Out, Zephyr said that she was working on policy proposals for the next session while traveling across Montana and the country to build coalitions and to ensure that "the good folks who want to get into office have the support they need in order to succeed."

In early December 2024, the House Rules Committee of the Montana State Legislature voted 10–12 to reject a measure which, according to Rachel Treisman from NPR, would have "required legislators to use the [bathroom] that aligned with their sex chromosomes at birth", with the proposed rule being seen as targeting Zephyr.

She and her wife have been featured at events with the Democratic Socialists of America, an organization that has politically endorsed her.

On November 11, 2026, the Democratic members of the Montana House of Representatives elected Zephyr to be one of three whips for the next congress. This will be the first time a transgender person will have served as a party whip within any state legislature.

=== 2023 legislative session ===
Zephyr was a vocal opponent of multiple anti-LGBT bills introduced during the 2023 legislative session. During a floor debate on April 18, 2023, Zephyr admonished those who supported Senate Bill 99, which prohibited gender-affirming medical and surgical care for minors. She first commented, "If you are forcing a trans child to go through puberty when they are trans, that is tantamount to torture, and this body should be ashamed." When this remark triggered an objection from Republican majority leader Sue Vinton, Zephyr replied, "The only thing I will say is if you vote 'yes' on this bill and 'yes' on these amendments, I hope the next time there's an invocation when you bow your heads in prayer, you see the blood on your hands." Zephyr's comments prompted an immediate backlash from House Republicans. The Montana Freedom Caucus issued a statement misgendering Zephyr and calling for her censure. House Minority Leader Kim Abbott defended her, describing the statement as "blatantly disrespectful and the farthest thing imaginable from the 'commitment to civil discourse' that these letter writers demand". After, Speaker Matt Regier refused to let Zephyr speak on any bills despite no censure having taken place.

On April 24, about 100 people gathered at a rally in support of Zephyr, prompting a heavy police presence. Later that afternoon, Zephyr was once again denied speaking privileges, prompting every single Democratic lawmaker who was present to stand in protest. All but two Republican members of the chamber's supermajority voted to uphold Regier's ruling. Protests in the House Gallery resulted in a half-hour delay in proceedings as riot police were brought in to clear the gallery. Zephyr remained at her desk on the floor, silently holding aloft a microphone. Seven protestors were arrested and were released without having been required to post bail. Afterwards, members of the conservative Montana Freedom Caucus accused her of "standing in the middle of the floor encouraging an insurrection."

On April 26, a hearing was held to vote on a proposal to sanction Zephyr's actions during the protest on April 24. After speeches made by legislators of both parties including Zephyr, the House voted 68 to 32, along straight party lines, to bar Zephyr from the House floor, gallery, and antechamber. This barring lasted through the remainder of the 2023 session. She was permitted to vote remotely for the remainder of the session.

On May 1, the bench from which she had been working at just off the House floor was occupied by a group of women, among them Regier's mother, and the wife of Republican senator Steve Hinebauch, in order to prevent Zephyr from sitting. Business Insider's Katie Balevic compared a photo of the women apparently laughing and leering to civil rights era photos of white student Hazel Massery shouting at African-American student Elizabeth Eckford during the Little Rock Crisis. On subsequent days, a group of Zephyr's supporters, primarily a group of tech workers able to work remotely dubbed "The Blue Bench Brigade," came in and occupied the bench to save Zephyr’s spot.

=== Legal action ===
Four days after having been barred from the House floor, Zephyr and several of her constituents sued the state and the Speaker in state court, alleging that the legislative action violated the Montana Constitution, specifically Zephyr's right to freedom of speech and equal protection under the law, and her constituents' rights to be represented by a member of their choice. The ACLU of Montana, along with several private law firms, represented Zephyr in the suit; state Attorney General Austin Knudsen defended the House. Zephyr relied in part on previous court decisions involving legislators' challenges to discipline by legislative bodies, including Boquist v. Courtney and Bond v. Floyd.

Zephyr also sought an emergency court order to allow her to return to the floor. On May 3, a district court judge denied the motion, holding that the separation of powers doctrine prevented the judiciary from such action against the legislative branch. Because the decision was issued the day after the state legislative session adjourned for the year, the suit and the denial of injunctive relief had little immediate effect.

== Electoral history ==
2022 Montana's 100th House district Democratic primary
Party	Candidate	Votes	%
Democratic	Zooey Zephyr	1,483	61.36%
Democratic	David Severson	934	38.64%
Total votes		2,417	100%

2022 Montana's 100th House district election
Party	Candidate	Votes	%
Democratic	Zooey Zephyr	4,053	79.21%
Republican	Sean Patrick McCoy	853	16.67%
Libertarian	Michael Vanecek	211	4.12%
Total votes		5,117	100%
Democratic hold			

2024 Montana's 95th House district election
Party	Candidate	Votes	%
Democratic	Zooey Zephyr	5,073	80.18%
Republican	Barbara Starmer	1,254	19.82%
Total votes		6,327	100%

2026 Montana's 95th House district election
Party	Candidate	Votes	%
Democratic	Zooey Zephyr	4,951	100%
Total votes		4,951	100%
Democratic hold			

== Personal life ==
Zephyr married journalist and trans activist Erin Reed on December 14, 2024 after a 19-month engagement. A few days prior to their engagement, Zephyr and Reed were victims of attempted swattings at their respective residences; Reed credited local police for helping to stop the incidents. In June 2023, the couple appeared at Pride events throughout the U.S. She later told Out: “Everywhere I travel, I see a queer community that is supporting one another through the hardships we are facing... We are facing an unprecedented level of attacks by the far right; however, broadly, this hate is being rejected."

== In popular culture ==
Zephyr is featured in the documentary film Seat 31: Zooey Zephyr. The film, directed by Kimberly Reed, documents Zephyr’s work in the Montana legislature and includes her proposal to her wife Erin Reed. The film was shortlisted for the 2025 Academy Awards in the Best Documentary Short Film category.

== See also ==
- List of transgender public officeholders in the United States
