= Marilyn Ryan =

Marilyn Ryan may be:

- Marilyn J. Ryan, Montana politician
- Marilyn Ryan (California politician)
