= 2004 Montana Initiative 96 =

Referendum to ban same-sex marriage

Initiative 96
- November 2, 2004
- Montana Definition of Marriage Amendment

Results
Choice	Votes	%
For	295,070	66.56%
Against	148,263	33.44%
Valid votes	443,333	97.20%
Invalid or blank votes	12,763	2.80%
Total votes	456,096	100.00%
Registered voters/turnout	638,474	69.44%
- County results Yes 80–90% 70–80% 60–70% 50–60%

Initiative 96 of 2004 is a ballot initiative that amended the Montana Constitution to prevent same-sex marriages from being conducted or recognized in Montana. The Initiative passed via public referendum on November 2, 2004, with 67% of voters supporting and 33% opposing.

The text of the adopted amendment, which is found at Article XIII, section 7 of the Montana Constitution, states:

Only a marriage between one man and one woman shall be valid or recognized as a marriage in this state.

== Results ==
Initiative 96
Choice	Votes	%
For	295,070	66.56
Against	148,263	33.44
Total	443,333	100.00
Registered voters/turnout	699,114	63.41

== See also ==
- LGBTQ rights in Montana
