= Caleb Hinkle =

American politician (born 1992)

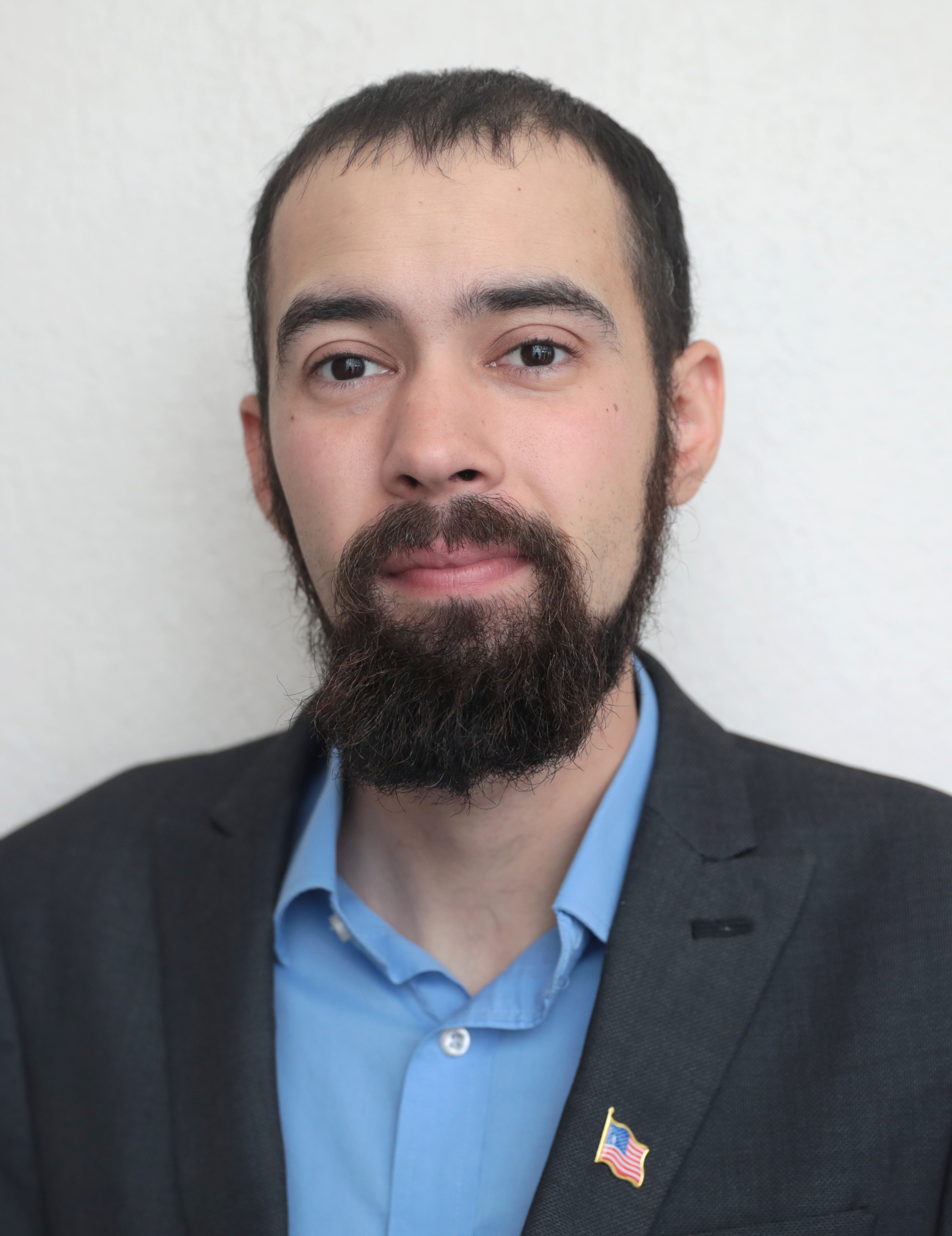
- Hinkle in 2022

Member of the Montana House of Representatives from the 68th district
- Incumbent
- Assumed office January 4, 2021
- Preceded by: Bruce Grubbs

Personal details
- Born: July 14, 1992 (age 34) Butte, Montana, U.S.
- Relatives: Jedediah Hinkle (brother)

Military service
- Allegiance: United States
- Branch/service: United States Army
- Rank: Sergeant
- Unit: Montana Army National Guard

Caleb Hinkle is an American politician serving as a member of the Montana House of Representatives from the 68th district. Elected in November 2020, he assumed office on January 4, 2021.

== Career ==
Hinkle served in the Montana National Guard and is a former sergeant. Hinkle later worked as the Western Montana field representative for Governor Greg Gianforte.

== Montana House of Representatives ==
Hinkle was elected to the Montana House of Representatives in November 2020 and assumed office on January 4, 2021.

=== Muzzleloader Hunting Season ===
In 2021 Hinkle introduced House Bill 242, which established the muzzleloaderhunting season, whereby only traditional flintlock, matchlock, and similar classic firearms with iron sights are used for hunting. Following the measure's passage, Montana was the last state to implement a designated muzzleloader season. Hinkle's inspiration for this legislation was derived from historical and movie depictions of muzzleloaders during the American Civil War and fur trappers predating the 20th century.

=== Drag shows ===
In 2025, Hinkle proposed Bill 675 which would allow people to sue drag queens up to three years after their performance. It was criticized by the Missoula City Government for violating freedom of speech protections under the First Amendment. The bill did not pass, with Republicans joining Democrats voting against it.

== Personal life ==
Hinkle is the brother of Montana State Representative Jedediah Hinkle.

== Electoral history ==
=== 2020 election ===
Montana’s 68th District House of Representatives election, 2020
Party	Candidate	Votes	%
Republican	Caleb Hinkle	4,293	66.7
Democratic	Emily Brosten	2,148	33.3
Total votes		5,979	100

=== 2022 general election ===
Montana’s 68th District House of Representatives election, 2022
Party	Candidate	Votes	%
Republican	Caleb Hinkle	2,772	65.8
Democratic	Joe Hancock	1,440	34.2
Total votes		4,685	100
