= Clayton Fiscus =

American politician (1936–2020)

Member of the Montana House of Representatives from the 43rd district
- In office January 5, 2015 – January 2, 2017
- Preceded by: Duane Ankney
- Succeeded by: Peggy Webb

Member of the Montana House of Representatives from the 46th district
- In office January 7, 2013 – January 5, 2015
- Preceded by: Ken Peterson
- Succeeded by: Don Jones

Personal details
- Born: July 11, 1936 Newell, South Dakota, U.S.
- Died: November 10, 2020 (aged 84) Billings, Montana, U.S.
- Party: Republican

Clayton Fiscus (July 11, 1936 – November 10, 2020) was an American politician. He was a member of the Montana House of Representatives from the Billings, Montana area from 2013 to 2017. He was a member of the Republican party. Fiscus died on November 10, 2020, at the age of 84.
