= Jim O'Hara =

American politician

James O'Hara

Member of the Montana House of Representatives from the 27th district
- In office January 2, 2017 – January 6, 2019
- Preceded by: Roy Hollandsworth
- Succeeded by: Joshua Kassmier

Personal details
- Born: January 14, 1954 (age 72)
- Party: Republican

Jim O'Hara (born January 14, 1954) is an American politician in the State of Montana. He served in the Montana House of Representatives from 2017 to 2019, representing District 27. He was elected as County Commissioner for Chouteau County, Montana in 2001 and ran to be the Republican candidate for Governor of Montana in 2012.

== Early life and business career ==
Jim O'Hara was born and raised in Fort Benton, MT near the sight where his grandfather homesteaded in 1910. He worked as a small farmer for over 20 years until he and his wife, Vicky, became small business owners, buying the Daily Grind in Great Falls.

O'Hara is a founder and board member of Lubigreen Biosynthetics, a research and development firm focusing on environmentally friendly lubricants.

== Chouteau County Commissioner ==
O'Hara was elected Chouteau County Commissioner in 2001

== 2012 gubernatorial campaign ==
O'Hara announced his candidacy in January, 2011. He spent seven years painting and placing his own billboards in each county in Montana, with each billboard depicting a different Montana county courthouse. He received national coverage on CBS for painting and placing his own billboards across the entire state.

== State representative ==
In 2016, O'Hara ran for the State House of Representatives to replace Representative Roy Hollandsworth who did not seek reelection. He defeated Darold Hutchinson in the Republican primary and won the general election.

== Election results ==
=== 2012 ===
Montana Gubernatorial Election, 2012 – Republican Primary
Party	Candidate	Votes	%	±%
Republican	Rick Hill	46,802	34.4%	N/A
Republican	Bob Fanning	3,087	2.3%	N/A
Republican	Neil Livingstone	12,038	8.8%	N/A
Republican	Jim Lynch	8,323	6.1%	N/A
Republican	Ken Miller	24,496	18.0%	N/A
Republican	Jim O'Hara	16,653	12.2%	N/A
Republican	Corey Stapleton	24,661	18.1%	N/A

=== 2016 ===
2016 Montana General Election
Party	Candidate	Votes	%	±%
Democratic	Ryan Rominger	1406	28%	
Republican	James O'Hara	3,568	72%	
