= Brandon Ler =

American politician

Speaker of the Montana House of Representatives
- Incumbent
- Assumed office January 6, 2025
- Preceded by: Matt Regier

Member of the Montana House of Representatives from the 35th district
- In office January 4, 2021 – January 6, 2025
- Preceded by: Joel Krautter
- Succeeded by: Gary Parry

Personal details
- Born: 1985 (age 40–41) Sidney, Montana, U.S.
- Party: Republican
- Spouse: Stephanie Ler
- Children: 3

Brandon Ler is an American politician, serving as a member of the Montana House of Representatives since 2021. A member of the Republican Party, Ler became the body's speaker in 2025. He owns and operates a fencing company and served for six years on the Savage School District Board of Education. Beginning in 2025, he began representing the 33rd State House District, following his election to that district's seat in 2024.

== Career ==
In February 2023, Ler introduced a bill that would state that misgendering a transgender student or calling them by their dead name —the name they were given at birth — is not considered a discriminatory practice. Ler characterized the bill as an effort to ensure students aren't punished by teachers or school officials for references made out of confusion. Ler, who is also a rancher stated he “taught his children from a very young age that cows are cows and bulls are bulls. Imagine one day my son goes to school and he is told the facts he has learned are no longer true.”

== Electoral history ==
=== 2020 Montana House of Representatives election ===
Montana's 35th District House of Representatives Primary Election, 2020
Party	Candidate	Votes	%
Republican	Brandon Ler	1,457	52.60
Republican	Joel Krautter (incumbent)	1,313	47.40
Total votes		2,770	100

Ler was uncontested in the general election, having received 4,760 votes.

=== 2022 Montana House of Representatives election ===
Ler ran uncontested in the primary, having received 1,877 votes.

He also ran uncontested in the general election, receiving 3,160 votes.

Political offices
Preceded by Matt Regier	Speaker of the Montana House of Representatives; 2025–present	Incumbent
