= Dan Villa =

American politician (born 1983)

Member of the Montana House of Representatives from the 86th district
- In office 2004 - 2009
- Succeeded by: Jim Jenner

Personal details
- Born: February 14, 1983 (age 43) Anaconda, Montana, U.S.
- Party: Democratic Party
- Education: Montana Tech of The University of Montana
- Occupation: student

Dan Villa is an American politician who was a Democratic Party member of the Montana House of Representatives, representing District 86 since 2004. He served as Chairman of the Sub-committee on Education. He served as Minority Caucus Leader in 2006.
