= Art Wittich =

American politician

Chair of the Montana Republican Party
- Incumbent
- Assumed office June 28, 2025
- Preceded by: Don Kaltschmidt

Member of the Montana House of Representatives from the 68th district
- In office January 2015 – January 2017
- Preceded by: Kelly Flynn
- Succeeded by: Bruce Grubbs

Member of the Montana Senate from the 35th district
- In office January 2011 – January 2015
- Preceded by: Gary Perry
- Succeeded by: Scott Sales

Personal details
- Born: 1957 or 1958 (age 68–69)
- Party: Republican
- Spouse: Candace
- Education: Utah State University (BS); University of Montana (JD)

Art Wittich (born 1957/1958) is an American politician from Montana. A member of the Republican Party, he was a member of the Montana Legislature, in the Montana Senate (2011 and 2013 sessions) from Senate District 35, and then the Montana House of Representatives (2015 session), from House District 68.

== Early life, education, and career ==
Wittich is from Englewood, Colorado. He was a member of the U.S. Coast Guard from 1975 to 1979, as an enlisted quartermaster. He worked as a firefighter at the U.S. Forest Service and Bureau of Land Management from 1980 to 1983. He graduated from Utah State University in 1982 with a B.S. in economics/environmental studies. He received a J.D. from University of Montana School of Law in 1985, and began practicing law in Montana that year. He was legal counsel for the Montana Power Company and for Governor Stan Stephens. He was a civilian lawyer for the U.S. Coast Guard in Washington, D.C. from 1992 to 1994.

Wittich then engaged in the private practice of law in Bozeman, Montana at the Wittich Law Firm, which had five attorneys as of 2011. In 2016, he was counsel for Greg Gianforte in Gianforte's dispute with the Montana Department of Fish, Wildlife and Parks over a public-access easement over land owned by Gianforte along the East Gallatin River.

== Political career ==
Wittich ran for election to the Montana Senate in 2006, in Senate District 32, covering a portion of Gallatin County. He ran unopposed in the primary, and lost to Democratic nominee Larry Jent in the general election.

Wittich won election to the state Senate in 2010, and became state Senate majority leader in 2013. During acrimonious intra-party feuds within legislative Republicans over various policy issues (such as acceptance of the Medicaid expansion), Wittich and Republican Senate president Jeff Essmann belonged to the more conservative faction, working together to purge moderate Republicans from the party.

In 2014, Wittich was elected to the Montana House of Representatives, defeating Democratic nominee Ashley Stevick. He was elected from House District 68, an area surrounding the River Rock area near Belgrade. In early 2015, Wittich opposed the Medicaid expansion in Montana; as House Human Services Committee chair, he maneuvered in an attempt to block the legislation. Wittich's effort failed in April 2015, when 13 Republicans joined the entire 41-member Democratic caucus to support the expansion. In the state House, Wittich, voting against legislation that benefited Montana State University, drawing criticism from university president Waded Cruzado. In 2015, he introduced a "nullification" bill to instruct state and local police to ignore federal gun laws. The bill passed the legislature and was vetoed by Governor Steve Bullock.

The Montana Commissioner of Political Practices filed a civil lawsuit against Wittich for illegally accepting more than $19,000 in campaign contributions from a dark money group, the National Right to Work Committee and its affiliates, including the American Tradition Partnership, during his 2010 primary campaign for state Senate. In April 2016, after a five-day trial, a jury in Helena found that Wittich had violated campaign finance and reporting laws. In August 2017, the Montana Supreme Court unanimously upheld the jury verdict, and Wittich paid a fine of $68,232. In October 2017, the Office of Disciplinary Counsel, which regulates the conduct of Montana lawyers, filed a professional misconduct complaint against Wittich, but it dropped the complaint the following month, and Wittich did not face disbarment or any professional disciplinary action.

Following the verdict, Wittich kept his seat in the state House. However, in June 2016, he lost his bid for renomination to Bruce Grubbs, who defeated him in the Republican primary.

Wittich was a Montana delegate to the 2016 Republican National Convention, which nominated Donald Trump for president. Wittich was Montana co-chair of the Trump's 2020 presidential campaign. Wittich is also a member of the Republican National Committee, as national committeeman, and is also one of 13 members of the executive board of the Republican Party of Montana. In 2023, Wittich, along with the other Montana Republican Party officials, denounced Marc Racicot, a former Republican governor and attorney general, for opposing Trump.

Party political offices
Preceded by Don Kaltschmidt	Chair of the Montana Republican Party; 2025–present	Incumbent
