= Jonathan McNiven =

American politician

Member of the Montana House of Representatives from the 44th district
- In office January 3, 2011 – January 5, 2015
- Preceded by: William Glaser
- Succeeded by: Dale Mortensen

Personal details
- Born: 1978 (age 47–48) Huntley, Montana, U.S.
- Party: Republican
- Education: Arizona State University

Jonathan McNiven is an American politician who was a Republican member of the Montana Legislature. He was elected to the Montana House of Representatives for House District 44 in November 2010 which represents a portion of the Yellowstone County area. McNiven was re-elected to his house district for a 2nd 2-year term in 2012.

Representative McNiven has served on the following Legislative Committees

Committee Assignments – Committee Role – Session

- (H) Business and Labor Committee Member – 2011, 2013 Legislative Session
- (H) Education Committee Member – 2011, 2013 Legislative Session
- (H) Ethics Committee(Vice Chair) – 2013 Legislative Session
- (H) Local Government Committee Member – 2013 Legislative Session
- (H) Subcommittee on Educational Truancy Member
- (H) Agriculture Committee – 2011 Legislative Session
