= Dave Gallik =

American politician (born 1954)

Member of the Montana House of Representatives from the 79th district
- In office January 3, 2005 – January 5, 2009
- Preceded by: Verdell Jackson
- Succeeded by: Chuck Hunter

Member of the Montana House of Representatives from the 51st district
- In office January 3, 2001 – January 3, 2005
- Succeeded by: Robyn Driscoll

Personal details
- Born: David Bruce Gallik; March 12, 1954 (age 72) Great Falls, Montana, U.S.
- Party: Democratic
- Spouse: Gail
- Education: Walla Walla Community College, University of Idaho, Gonzaga University
- Occupation: attorney

David Bruce Gallik (born March 12, 1954) was a Democratic Party member of the Montana House of Representatives, representing District 79 from 2000 to 2008.
