= Tom Woods (Montana politician) =

American politician

Member of the Montana House of Representatives
- In office January 5, 2015 – January 4, 2021
- Preceded by: Reilly Neill
- Succeeded by: Ed Stafman
- Constituency: 62nd District
- In office January 7, 2013 – January 5, 2015
- Preceded by: Franke Wilmer
- Succeeded by: Kerry White
- Constituency: 64th District

Personal details
- Born: August 10, 1961 (age 64) Cleveland, Ohio, U.S.
- Party: Democratic

Tom Woods (born August 10, 1961) is an American politician who served as a member of the Montana House of Representatives from the 62nd district from 2013 to 2021. He is a member of the Democratic Party. In 2016, he was elected as House minority caucus chair. He ran for the Montana Public Service Commission in 2020, but lost the general election.
