= Ken Peterson (Montana politician) =

American politician

Kenneth Peterson

Member of the Montana House of Representatives from the 46th district
- In office January 3, 2007 – January 7, 2013
- Succeeded by: Clayton Fiscus
- In office January 3, 2001 – January 6, 2003

Personal details
- Born: 1935 (age 90–91)
- Party: Republican
- Profession: Attorney

Kenneth D. Peterson (born 1935) is a member of the State House of Representatives of Montana. A native of Babb, Montana, Peterson received his bachelor's degree from Brigham Young University and his JD from the University of Montana. Peterson served in both private practice and as a city attorney in Soap Lake, Washington (1968–73) and Billings, Montana (1977-84). He was elected to the Montana State legislature in 2000 but lost his bid for re-election in 2002. He was again elected to the State Legislature beginning his current period of service in 2007.

Peterson and his wife Cherye are the parents of six children. Peterson is a Latter-day Saint.
