= Trudi Schmidt =

American politician (born 1938)

Member of the Montana Senate from the 11th district
- In office 2003–2009

Member of the Montana House of Representatives
- In office 1996 – 2003
- In office 2010–2013
- Succeeded by: Casey Schreiner

Personal details
- Born: December 7, 1938 (age 87) Butte, Montana, U.S.
- Party: Democratic
- Education: University of Montana (BS, MS)
- Occupation: Educator, politician

Trudi Ann Schmidt (born December 7, 1938) is an American politician and educator who served as a member of both chambers of the Montana Legislature.

== Early life and education ==
Schmidt was born in Butte, Montana. She earned a Bachelor of Science and Master of Science from the University of Montana.

== Career ==
Schmidt began her career as a high school teacher in Washougal, Washington before returning to Montana. She worked as a counselor and teacher at Great Falls High School and Great Falls College Montana State University.

Schmidt was elected to the Montana House of Representatives in 1996, representing the 42nd district from 1997 to 2003. From 2003 to 2005, Schmidt represented the 21st district in the Montana Senate. From 2007 to 2009, she represented the 11th district. In 2010, she returned to the Montana House to represent the 22nd district. She retired in 2013 and was succeeded by Casey Schreiner.
