= Jim Jenner =

American politician

Member of Montana House of Representatives for District 86
- In office 2009–2011
- Preceded by: Dan Villa
- Succeeded by: Kathy Swanson

Personal details
- Party: Democratic

Jim Jenner is an American politician. He was a member of the Montana House of Representatives from 2009 to 2011.
