= Chuck Hunter =

American politician

Member of the Montana House of Representatives
- In office January 5, 2015 – January 2, 2017
- Preceded by: Wylie Galt
- Succeeded by: Kim Abbott
- Constituency: District 83

Member of the Montana House of Representatives District 79
- In office January 5, 2009 – January 5, 2015
- Preceded by: Dave Gallik
- Succeeded by: Jenny Eck

Personal details
- Party: Democratic

Chuck Hunter is a Democratic member of the Montana Legislature. He was elected to House District 79 which represents a portion of the Lewis and Clark County area.

Hunter served as Minority Leader of the House during the 2013-2014 session and the 2015-2016 session.
