= Tom Steenberg =

American politician from Montana

Member of the Montana Senate from the 50th district
- In office August 31, 2021 – January 2, 2023
- Preceded by: Bryce Bennett
- Succeeded by: Andrea Olsen

Member of the Montana House of Representatives
- In office January 5, 2015 – January 2, 2017
- Preceded by: Kimberly Dudik
- Succeeded by: Marilyn Ryan
- Constituency: 99th District
- In office January 7, 2013 – January 5, 2015
- Preceded by: Diane Sands
- Succeeded by: Nancy Wilson
- Constituency: 95th District

Personal details
- Born: 1959 (age 66–67)
- Party: Democratic
- Education: Carleton College

Thomas A. Steenberg (born 1959) is an American politician. He has served as a Democratic member of the Montana House of Representatives from 2013 to 2017. In August 2021, Steenberg was appointed to replace Bryce Bennett in the Montana Senate. Steenberg lost the 2022 Democratic primary for the 50th district to Andrea Olsen.
