= Montana Senate Bill 99 =

Blocked 2023 Montana law

Montana Legislature
- Long title: AN ACT PROVIDING FOR A YOUTH HEALTH PROTECTION ACT; PROHIBITING CERTAIN MEDICAL AND SURGICAL TREATMENTS TO TREAT MINORS WITH GENDER DYSPHORIA; PROHIBITING PUBLIC FUNDS, PROGRAMS, PROPERTY, AND EMPLOYEES FROM BEING USED FOR THESE TREATMENTS; PROVIDING THAT A HEALTH CARE PROFESSIONAL WHO VIOLATES THIS LAW COMMITS PROFESSIONAL MISCONDUCT; PROVIDING A PRIVATE CAUSE OF ACTION; PROHIBITING DISCHARGE OF PROFESSIONAL LIABILITY VIA INSURANCE; AND PROVIDING DEFINITIONS.
- Territorial extent: Montana
- Enacted by: Montana Senate
- Enacted: February 8, 2023
- Enacted by: Montana House of Representatives
- Enacted: March 24, 2023
- Signed by: Greg Gianforte
- Signed: April 28, 2023
- Effective: October 1, 2023

Legislative history

First chamber: Montana Senate
- Introduced by: John Fuller
- Introduced: January 3, 2023
- First reading: January 3, 2023
- Second reading: February 7, 2023
- Voting summary: 28 voted for; 21 voted against; 1 absent
- Third reading: February 8, 2023
- Voting summary: 30 voted for; 20 voted against

Second chamber: Montana House of Representatives
- Received from the Montana Senate: February 9, 2023
- First reading: March 13, 2023
- Second reading: March 23, 2023
- Voting summary: 65 voted for; 35 voted against; 2 absent
- Third reading: March 24, 2023
- Voting summary: 65 voted for; 34 voted against; 1 absent

Final stages
- Finally passed both chambers: April 18, 2023

Struck down by
- Montana Fourth Judicial Circuit Court
- Status: Blocked

Montana Senate Bill 99 (SB 99), also known as the Youth Health Protection Act, is a 2023 law in the state of Montana that restricts access to gender-affirming medical care for minors, including gender-affirming hormone therapy and puberty blockers. The bill was signed into law by Governor Greg Gianforte on April 28, 2023, and was scheduled to become law on October 1, 2023.

Missoula County District Court judge Jason Marks temporarily placed an injunction on the law in September 2023, declaring in a preliminary ruling that the law likely violated the Montana Constitution. Following an appeal, the Montana Supreme Court upheld the injunction in December 2024. Following an April 2025 trial, on May 13, 2025, Judge Marks permanently blocked Senate Bill 99 from being enforced, stating that it was discriminatory and violated the right to privacy in the Montana Constitution.

== Legislative history ==
A bill was originally introduced in the 2021 legislative session by state senator John Fuller to prohibit gender-affirming medical care in the state, but failed. Fuller reintroduced the bill in the 2023 session. Senate Bill 99 passed the legislature in March 2023, but was vetoed by governor Greg Gianforte, requesting an amendment to redefine male and female in state law. The bill fully passed both chambers, including the amendment, on April 18, 2023. It was signed into law by Gianforte on April 28.

=== Zooey Zephyr controversy ===
During the debate of Senate Bill 99 in the Montana House of Representatives, Republicans in the House called for the censure and removal of Democratic representative Zooey Zephyr, following a statement on the House floor in which she said there would be "blood on their hands" if Senate Bill 99 was passed. Zephyr was removed from the House during the proceedings, but voted on bills remotely from outside of the chamber. On April 26, 2023, the Montana House of Representatives voted along party lines to punish Zephyr by banning her from entering the House floor or discussing legislation, only being allowed to vote remotely until the end of the 2023 legislative session.

== Provisions ==
Senate Bill 99 prohibits medical professionals from administering gender-affirming medical care, which includes gender-affirming hormone therapy and puberty blockers, to Montanans under eighteen years of age. The bill also prohibited gender-affirming surgeries. If it was found that a medical professional knowingly provided such care to minors, their medical licenses could be revoked. A statute of limitations of 25 years was established for lawsuits involving the provision of gender-affirming care to minors.
