= 2025 Academy Awards =

2025 Academy Awards may refer to:

- 97th Academy Awards, the Academy Awards ceremony that took place in 2025, honoring the best in film for 2024
- 98th Academy Awards, the Academy Awards ceremony that took place in 2026, honoring the best in film for 2025
