= Andrea Olsen =

American politician from Montana

Member of the Montana Senate from the 50th district
- Incumbent
- Assumed office January 2, 2023
- Preceded by: Tom Steenberg

Member of the Montana House of Representatives from the 100th district
- In office January 5, 2015 – January 2, 2023
- Preceded by: Champ Edmunds
- Succeeded by: Zooey Zephyr

Personal details
- Born: December 24, 1961 (age 64) Missoula, Montana, U.S.
- Party: Democratic
- Education: University of Montana
- Occupation: Attorney

Andrea Olsen (born December 24, 1961) is an American politician who served in the Montana House of Representatives for the 100th district from 2015 to 2023. She is a current member of the Montana Senate, representing Missoula in the 50th district, having won the 2022 election.
