= Jenny Eck =

American politician

Minority Leader of the Montana House of Representatives
- In office January 2, 2017 – January 7, 2019
- Preceded by: Chuck Hunter
- Succeeded by: Casey Schreiner

Member of the Montana House of Representatives from the 79th district
- In office January 7, 2013 – January 7, 2019
- Preceded by: Chuck Hunter
- Succeeded by: Robert Farris-Olsen

Personal details
- Born: March 18, 1979 (age 47) Arlington, Virginia, U.S.
- Party: Democratic
- Education: Smith College (BA)

Jenny Eck is an American politician who served as a member of the Montana Legislature. She was elected to House District 79, includes the Helena, Montana area. In 2016, Eck was selected as the Montana Director of the Hillary Clinton 2016 presidential campaign.

Eck served as a Minority Whip of the House during the 2015–2016 session.

Montana House of Representatives
Preceded by Chuck Hunter	Minority Leader of the Montana House of Representatives; 2017–2019	Succeeded by Casey Schreiner
