= Jon Knokey =

American politician (born 1981)

Member of the Montana House of Representatives from the 65th district
- In office January 2, 2017 – January 6, 2019
- Preceded by: Christopher Pope
- Succeeded by: Christopher Pope

Personal details
- Born: October 16, 1981 (age 44) Portland, Oregon, U.S.
- Party: Republican
- Education: Montana State University, Bozeman (BS); Dartmouth College (MBA); Harvard University (MPA)

Jon A. Knokey is an American politician. He served as a Republican member of the Montana House of Representatives, where he represented District 65, including parts of Bozeman, Montana. Knokey is a candidate for Lieutenant Governor of Montana, running on a ticket with Montana Attorney General Tim Fox.
