= Kathy Swanson =

American politician (1947–2025)

Member of the Montana House of Representatives 86th district (2011–2015) 77th district (2015–2019)
- In office 2011–2019
- Preceded by: Jim Jenner
- Succeeded by: Mark Sweeney

Personal details
- Born: Kathleen Keenan; August 23, 1947 Anaconda, Montana, U.S.
- Died: February 25, 2025 (aged 77) Anaconda, Montana, U.S.
- Party: Democratic
- Spouse: Raymond "Butch" Swanson
- Parents: Patrick John Keenan (father); Ann Vanisko (mother)

Kathleen Keenan Swanson (August 23, 1947 – February 25, 2025) was an American politician who served as a member of the Montana House of Representatives from 2011 to 2019. She was elected in 2010 by house district 86, which represented the Granite County area. She died February 25, 2025, at the age of 77.
