= Jane Gillette =

American dentist and politician

Member of the Montana House of Representatives from the 64th district
- Incumbent
- Assumed office January 4, 2021
- Preceded by: Kerry White

Personal details
- Born: 1971 (age 54–55) Tacoma, Washington, U.S.
- Party: Republican
- Spouse: Christopher
- Children: Three
- Education: Pacific Lutheran University (BS); University of Washington (DDS); University of Montana (MPH)

Military service
- Allegiance: United States
- Branch/service: United States Air Force
- Years of service: 1993–2013
- Rank: Captain
- Awards: Air Force Achievement Medal (2)

Jane Gillette (born 1971) is an American dentist and politician serving as a member of the Montana House of Representatives from the 64th district. Elected in November 2020, she assumed office on January 4, 2021.

== Education ==
Gillette earned a Bachelor of Science degree in biology from Pacific Lutheran University, a Doctor of Dental Surgery from the University of Washington in 2002, and a Master of Public Health from the University of Montana.

== Career ==
Gillette served in the United States Air Force from 1993 to 2013. She later worked as the dental director of Community Health Partners and owner of the Mint Dental Studio. Gillette is now a clinical research dentist, specializing in oral disease prevention, health disparities, and evidence-based dentistry. She previously served as a health consultant to Greg Gianforte. Gillette was elected to the Montana House of Representatives in November 2020 and assumed office in January 2021.
