= Katie Sullivan (politician) =

American politician

Minority Leader of the Montana House of Representatives
- Incumbent
- Assumed office January 6, 2025
- Preceded by: Kim Abbott

Member of the Montana House of Representatives from the 89th district
- Incumbent
- Assumed office January 7, 2019
- Preceded by: Dave Severson

Personal details
- Party: Democratic
- Spouse: Phil
- Education: University of Montana (BA, JD); University of Colorado Law School (LLM)

Katherine E. Sullivan is an American politician. She is a Democrat representing the 89th district in the Montana House of Representatives.

== Political career ==
In March 2018, former Representative Dave Severson was appointed to replace Nate McConnell in the Montana House, and decided not to file for election. Sullivan filed for election and won a four-way Democratic primary with 49.8% of the vote. She went on to win the general election with 62.4% of the vote.

In the 2020 general election, Sullivan won the general election and was reelected to the Montana House.

As of July 2020, Sullivan sits on the following committees:

- Energy, Telecommunications, and Federal Relations
- Rules
- Business and Labor
- Agriculture

=== Electoral history ===
2018 Democratic primary: Montana House of Representatives, District 89
Party	Candidate	Votes	%
Democratic	Katie Sullivan	737	49.8%
Democratic	Patrick Weasel Head	404	27.3%
Democratic	Dirk Williams	298	20.1%
Democratic	Jon Van Dyke	42	2.8%

2018 general election: Montana House of Representatives, District 89
Party	Candidate	Votes	%
Democratic	Katie Sullivan	3,121	62.4%
Republican	David Moore	1,879	37.6%

== Personal life ==
Sullivan has a degree in human biology from the University of Montana, a Juris Doctor from the University of Montana School of Law, and an Master of Laws (LL.M) from the University of Colorado Law School.

Montana House of Representatives
Preceded by Kim Abbott	Minority Leader of the Montana House of Representatives; 2025–present	Incumbent
