= Steve Lavin (politician) =

American politician

Member of the Montana House of Representatives from the 8th district
- In office January 3, 2011 – December 2018
- Succeeded by: John Fuller

Personal details
- Born: April 23, 1967 (age 59) Helena, Montana
- Party: Republican
- Education: Montana State University
- Profession: Montana Highway Patrol

Stephen A. (Steve) Lavin (born April 23, 1967) is a Republican member of the Montana Legislature. He was elected to House District 8 which represents the Kalispell, Montana area.

In February 2013, Lavin gained nationwide media attention for introducing a bill that would allow an authorized representative to vote in municipal elections on behalf of a corporation owning property in that municipality. Lavin later said that he introduced the bill at the request of a constituent. He believed the bill merely allowed non-resident property owners to vote in elections and did not realize that the bill would also allow representatives to vote on behalf of corporations. The bill died in committee.

In 2020, Lavin, then a Major in the Montana Highway Patol, was selected to become the new Colonel, succeeding the retirement of Colonel Tom Butler. At the beginning of 2021, Lavin assumed the role of the Colonel of the Montana Highway Patrol. Lavin resigned in March 2024; on September 27, 2024 he filed suit against Montana Attorney General Austin Knudsen and the state of Montana claiming that he had been illegally pressured into retiring because Knudsen was upset about the results of an anonymous opinion survey of highway patrol staff.
