= Edward Greef =

American politician

Member, Montana House of Representatives, 88th District
- In office January 5, 2015 – January 4, 2019
- Succeeded by: Sharon Greef

Member, Montana House of Representatives, 90th District
- In office 2011–2015

Personal details
- Born: September 22, 1940 (age 85) Sandpoint, Idaho
- Party: Republican
- Spouse: Sharon Greef

Edward Greef (born September 22, 1940) is a Republican who previously represented Districts 88 and 90 in the Montana House of Representatives.
