= Bruce Grubbs =

American politician

Member of the Montana House of Representatives from the 68th district
- In office January 2, 2017 – January 4, 2021
- Preceded by: Art Wittich
- Succeeded by: Caleb Hinkle

Personal details
- Born: Bloomfield Hills, Michigan
- Party: Republican
- Spouse: Robin
- Children: 2
- Education: University of Michigan

Bruce Grubbs is an American politician who served as a member of the Montana House of Representatives for the 68th district from 2017 to 2021.

== Early life and education ==
Grubbs grew up in Detroit and graduated from the University of Michigan in 1972. He moved to Bozeman in 1982.

== Political career ==
Grubbs was previously a member of the Bozeman, Montana School Board.

In 2016, Grubbs ran for election to represent District 68 in the Montana House of Representatives, challenging incumbent Art Wittich, as well as Michael Comstock, in the Republican primary. Grubbs won the three-way primary with 45.12% of the vote, and went on to win the general election with 74.37% of the vote. He was reelected in 2018, defeating Ron Murray in the Republican primary and Seth Mangini in the general election.

In 2020, Grubbs ran for reelection again, but lost the Republican primary to Caleb Hinkle.

== Elections ==
2016 Republican primary: Montana House of Representatives, District 68
Party	Candidate	Votes	%
Republican	Bruce Grubbs	712	45.1
Republican	Art Wittich (incumbent)	602	38.2%
Republican	Michael Comstock	264	16.7%
Total votes		1,578	100.0

2016 general election: Montana House of Representatives, District 68
Party	Candidate	Votes	%
Republican	Bruce Grubbs (incumbent)	3,700	74.4
Democratic	David Andes	1,275	25.6
Total votes		4,975	100.0

2018 Republican primary: Montana House of Representatives, District 68
Party	Candidate	Votes	%
Republican	Bruce Grubbs (incumbent)	756	56.7%
Republican	Ron Murray	577	43.3%
Total votes		1,333	100.0

2018 general election: Montana House of Representatives, District 68
Party	Candidate	Votes	%
Republican	Bruce Grubbs (incumbent)	3,386	67.4
Democratic	Seth Mangini	1,637	32.6
Total votes		5,023	100.0

2020 Republican primary: Montana House of Representatives, District 68
Party	Candidate	Votes	%
Republican	Caleb Hinkle	1,316	57.7
Republican	Bruce Grubbs (incumbent)	964	42.3%
Total votes		2,280	100.0
