= Sharon Greef =

American politician from Montana

Member of the Montana House of Representatives from the 88th district
- Incumbent
- Assumed office January 7, 2019
- Preceded by: Edward Greef

Personal details
- Born: 1944 (age 81–82) Tacoma, Washington
- Party: Republican
- Spouse: Edward Greef
- Children: 2

Sharon Greef is an American politician. She is a Republican representing the 88th district in the Montana House of Representatives.

== Political career ==
In 2018, Greef's husband and former District 88 representative Edward Greef was unable to run for reelection due to term limits, and she ran for election. She won a three-way Republican primary with 46.5% of the vote, and won the general election with 63.1% of the vote. She was also reelected in the 2020 election.

As of July 2020, Greef sits on the following committees:

- State Administration
- Transportation

In 2021, she advocated for Republican legislation to end same-day voter registration in Montana for all except military and overseas voters.

== Electoral history ==
=== 2018 ===
2018 Republican primary: Montana House of Representatives, District 88
Party	Candidate	Votes	%
Republican	Sharon Greef	782	46.5%
Republican	Jim Crews	611	36.3%
Republican	Kim Stoltz	288	17.1%

2018 general election: Montana House of Representatives, District 88
Party	Candidate	Votes	%
Republican	Sharon Greef	3,669	63.1%
Democratic	Margaret Gorski	2,141	36.9%

=== 2020 ===
2020 Republican primary: Montana House of Representatives, District 88
Party	Candidate	Votes	%
Republican	Sharon Greef	1,290	46.6%
Republican	Scott Roy McLean	860	31.0%
Republican	Jim Crews	620	22.4%

== Personal life ==
Greef and her husband Ed Greef have two children. Their family lives in Florence, Montana.
