= Zac Perry =

American politician

Member of the Montana House of Representatives from the 3rd district
- In office 2015 – September 1, 2019

Personal details
- Party: Democratic

Zac Perry is an American politician. He was a member of the Montana House of Representatives until his resignation in 2019.
