= Joel Krautter =

American politician (born 1987)

Member of the Montana House of Representatives from the 35th district
- In office January 7, 2019 – January 4, 2021
- Preceded by: Scott Staffanson
- Succeeded by: Brandon Ler

Personal details
- Born: December 8, 1987 (age 38) Idaho Falls, Idaho, U.S.
- Party: Democratic (before 2010); Republican (2010–present)
- Education: Liberty University (BA); University of Montana (JD)

Joel Krautter (born December 8, 1987) is a Montana attorney, who practices law in the areas of social security disability law (SSDI and SSI), personal injury, constitutional law, and estate and elder - Medicaid planning law. He has been an American politician attorney, small business owner and was a Republican candidate for the eastern Montana congressional district in Montana. Krautter was a Republican member of the Montana House of Representatives from the 35th district. His law firm is Netzer Krautter Law Firm, with offices in Sidney and Billings, Montana, that also practices law in the area of mineral rights. Joel Krautter is also licensed to practice law in North Dakota.

== Early life ==
Joel Krautter grew up in Deer Lodge, Montana, graduating from Powell County High School, where he helped lead the golf team to two state championships in 2005 and 2007.

== Education ==
In 2011, Krautter earned a Bachelor of Science degree in Government: Pre-law from Liberty University, a private evangelical Christian university in Lynchburg, Virginia. While at Liberty University, Krautter was involved in campus politics. He was briefly involved with both the college democrats and college republicans while at Liberty. He was also involved in pro-Israel activism, serving as president of the university’s Stand with Israel club. Krautter was elected president of the graduating class of 2011. In 2014, Krautter earned a JD degree from University of Montana School of Law.

== Career ==
Krautter first ran for office in 2016, challenging incumbent Scott Staffanson for MT House District 35 in the Republican primary. Staffanson would win re-election, although Krautter in his first campaign would capture 40% of the vote against the lifelong Sidney resident. During the campaign Krautter wrote an op-ed that discussed why he was a Republican.

Krautter was subsequently elected chairman of the Richland County Republican Central Committee in 2017.

In 2018, Krautter ran for the open House District 35 seat after Staffanson retired, defeating Tanya Rost in the Republican primary.

On November 6, 2018, Krautter won the general election, running unopposed and became a Republican member of Montana House of Representatives for District 35.

== Montana State Legislature ==
=== 2016 State House of Representatives election ===
In 2016, Krautter was unsuccessful in the Republican Party primary.

Montana's 35th District House of Representatives Primary Election, 2016
Party	Candidate	Votes	%
Republican	Scott Staffanson (Incumbent)	1,127	59.98
Republican	Joel Krautter	752	40.02
Total votes		1,879	100

=== 2018 State House of Representatives election ===
Krautter was elected in the 2018 Republican primary over Tanya Rost.

Montana's 35th District House of Representatives Primary Election, 2018
Party	Candidate	Votes	%
Republican	Joel Krautter	1,140	53.90
Republican	Tanya Rost	975	46.10
Total votes		2,115	100

Krautter was uncontested in the general election, having received 3,688 votes.

=== 2020 State House of Representatives election ===
Krautter was defeated for re-election in the 2020 Primary.

Montana's 35th District House of Representatives Primary Election, 2020
Party	Candidate	Votes	%
Republican	Brandon Ler	1,457	52.60
Republican	Joel Krautter (Incumbent)	1,313	47.40
Total votes		2,770	100

=== 2024 Campaign for U.S. House of Representatives ===
On December 31, 2023, Krautter announced he would be running for the eastern Montana seat in the U.S. House of Representatives in the 2024 election.

== Awards ==
- 2019 Rookie of the Year Award. Presented by Montana Farm Bureau Federation.
- Champion of Business Award. Presented by Montana Chamber of Commerce.
- Spirit Award. Presented by Disability Rights Montana.
- Hero Award. Presented by National Association of Mental Illness, Montana Chapter.

== Personal life ==
In August 2014, Krautter moved to Sidney, Montana after graduating from law school. In 2022, Krautter relocated to Billings, Montana and began working from the law firm's Billings branch office. Krautter is a co-founder of the non-profit organization, Friends of the Montana Constitution.
