= Ray Shaw (politician) =

American politician from Montana

Member of the Montana House of Representatives from the 71st district
- In office January 7, 2013 – January 4, 2021
- Preceded by: Bob Wagner
- Succeeded by: Kenneth Walsh

Personal details
- Born: c. 1946 (age 79–80)
- Party: Republican
- Children: 3
- Occupation: Businessman, politician

Military service
- Allegiance: United States
- Branch/service: United States Air Force

Ray Shaw (born c. 1946) is an American politician who served as a member of the Montana House of Representatives for the District 71 from 2013 to 2021.

== Education ==
Shaw attended Montana Tech and University of Montana.

== Career ==
In military, Shaw served in the United States Air Force. Shaw is a businessman and owner of Rubystone Resources.

On November 6, 2012, Shaw won the election and became a Republican member of Montana House of Representatives for District 71. Shaw defeated Kim Miller and Donald J. Lewinsky with 56.93% of the votes. On November 4, 2014, as an incumbent, Shaw won the election and continued serving District 71. Shaw defeated Johanna Lester with 73.89% of the votes. On November 8, 2016, as an incumbent, Shaw won the election unopposed and continued serving District 71. On November 6, 2018, as an incumbent, Shaw won the election and continued serving District 71. Shaw defeated Jay A. Frederick and Michael White with 57.90% of the votes.

== Awards ==
- 2019 Patriot Award. Presented by Major General Matt Quinn at the Montana Youth Challenge Academy.
- 2019 Distinguished Service Golden Plow Award. Presented by Montana Farm Bureau Federation.

== Personal life ==
Shaw has three children. Shaw and his family live in Sheridan, Montana.
