= Ron Ehli =

American politician

Majority Leader of the Montana House of Representatives
- In office January 2, 2017 – January 7, 2019
- Preceded by: Keith Regier
- Succeeded by: Brad Tschida

Member of the Montana House of Representatives from the 86th district
- In office January 3, 2011 – January 7, 2019
- Preceded by: Bob Lake
- Succeeded by: David Bedey

Personal details
- Born: December 7, 1956 (age 69) Circle, Montana, U.S.
- Party: Republican
- Education: Montana State University, Billings (BS)

Ron Ehli (born December 7, 1956) is an American politician. He served as a Republican member of the Montana House of Representatives.

Montana House of Representatives
Preceded by Keith Regier	Majority Leader of the Montana House of Representatives; 2017–2019	Succeeded by Brad Tschida
