= Casey Schreiner =

American politician and educator; Minority Leader of Montana House of Representatives

Minority Leader of the Montana House of Representatives
- In office January 7, 2019 – January 4, 2021
- Preceded by: Jenny Eck
- Succeeded by: Kim Abbott

Member of the Montana House of Representatives from the 26th district
- In office January 7, 2013 – January 4, 2021
- Preceded by: Trudi Schmidt
- Succeeded by: Jeremy Trebas

Personal details
- Born: July 10, 1982 (age 44) Great Falls, Montana, U.S.
- Party: Democratic
- Spouse: Teresa Bartoletti
- Education: Montana State University, Bozeman (BS, MEd)
- Website: Campaign website

Casey Schreiner (born July 10, 1982) is an American politician and former educator who served as the Minority Leader of the Montana House of Representatives from 2019 to 2021, and where he represented the 26th district from 2013 to 2021. Before serving in the legislature, Schreiner worked as a middle school teacher, executive director of the Montana State Workforce Innovation Board, and as the director of work-based learning for the Montana Department of Labor and Industry.

== Early life and education ==
Born in Great Falls, Montana, Casey Schreiner attended Roosevelt Elementary, Paris Gibson Middle School, and is a graduate of Great Falls High School in Great Falls. In 2005, Schreiner earned a Bachelor of Science in cell biology and neuroscience from Montana State University. In 2010, he earned a Master of Education in curriculum and instruction from Montana State University.

== Career ==
Schreiner began his career as a recruitment representative for Montana State University. After earning his Master's Degree, Schreiner worked as a middle school science teacher in the Great Falls Public School System and at Butte Central Catholic High School.

Schreiner was elected to the Montana House of Representatives in 2013, succeeding Trudi Schmidt. As Minority Leader, Schreiner succeeded in extending Medicaid expansion, which brought government-funded health care to nearly 100,000 low-income families; funding education; and passing a comprehensive infrastructure package.

In the 2020 Montana gubernatorial election, Schreiner was a candidate for governor until withdrawing from the Democratic primary on February 3, 2020. On February 28, 2020, candidate Mike Cooney selected Schreiner to serve as his running mate. Cooney became the Democratic nominee in the June 2, 2020 primary election. Schreiner and Cooney faced incumbent Congressman Greg Gianforte and Kristen Juras in the November, 2020 general election, where they were unsuccessful in their bid for governor and lieutenant governor.

== Personal life ==
Schreiner is married to his wife Teresa. Together, they have three children: Aiden, Liam, and Finn. Two of Schreiner's children are on the autism spectrum.

Montana House of Representatives
| Preceded by Jenny Eck | Minority Leader of the Montana House of Representatives; 2019–2021 | Succeeded by Kim Abbott |
| Preceded by Trudi Schmidt | Member of the Montana House of Representatives from the 26th district 2013–2021 | Succeeded by Jeremy Trebas |
