= Brad Tschida =

American politician

Majority Leader of the Montana House of Representatives
- In office January 7, 2019 – January 4, 2021
- Preceded by: Ron Ehli
- Succeeded by: Sue Vinton

Member of the Montana House of Representatives from the 97th district
- Incumbent
- Assumed office January 5, 2015
- Preceded by: Nancy Wilson

Personal details
- Born: 1954 (age 71–72) Minneapolis, Minnesota, U.S.
- Party: Republican
- Spouse: Leslee
- Children: 5
- Education: University of Montana (BA)

Brad Tschida (born c. 1954) is an American politician who has served as a Republican member for the 97th district in the Montana House of Representatives since 2015. In 2018, he was elected House Majority Leader. In April 2021, Tschida announced he was running for State Senate in Senate district 49.

Montana House of Representatives
Preceded by Ron Ehli	Majority Leader of the Montana House of Representatives; 2019–2021	Succeeded by Sue Vinton
