= Bridget Smith (politician) =

American politician

Bridget Smith is an American politician. She served as a Democratic member of the Montana House of Representatives for District 31.

She attended Los Angeles Pierce School and currently lives in Wolf Point, Montana.
