= Nancy Ballance =

American politician

Nancy Ballance is an American politician from San Fernando Valley, California. She served as a Republican member of the Montana House of Representatives.
