= James G. Hollandsworth =

American historian, professor, psychologist (1944–2010)

James Guy Hollandsworth Jr. (January 7, 1944 – September 21, 2010) was an American psychologist, professor, and historian. He was an academic administrator and professor at the University of Southern Mississippi. He wrote books about Alfred Holt Stone, the New Orleans Massacre of 1866, Nathan P. Banks, Louisiana Native Guard military units and the physiology of psychological disorders.

His father, James Guy "Pop" Hollandsworth, was a mountain climber.

== Select writings ==
- Physiology and Behavior Therapy: Conceptual Guidelines for the Clinician Plenum Press, New York (1986), call number RC489.B4 H6 1986
- The Physiology of Psychological Disorders: Schizophrenia, Depression, Anxiety, and Substance Abuse Plenum Press, New York (1990) call number RC514 .H59 1990
- The Louisiana Native Guards: The Black Military Experience during the Civil War Louisiana State University Press, Baton Rouge (1995) call number E540.N3 H65 1995
- Pretense of Glory: The Life of General Nathaniel P. Banks Louisiana State University Press, Baton Rouge (1998) call number E467.1.B23 H65
- An Absolute Massacre: The New Orleans Race Riot of July 30, 1866 Louisiana State University Press, Baton Rouge (2001)
- Portrait of a Scientific Racist; Alfred Holt Stone of Mississippi (2008)
