= Scott Staffanson =

American politician

Member of the Montana House of Representatives from the 35th district
- In office August 19, 2013 – January 7, 2019
- Preceded by: David Halvorson
- Succeeded by: Joel Krautter

Personal details
- Born: October 1, 1960 (age 66) Richland County, Montana, U.S.
- Education: Montana State University

Scott Staffanson (born October 1, 1960) is an American politician who is a former member of the Montana House of Representatives. He did not run for re-election in 2018, and his term ended on January 7, 2019.

== Early life and education ==
Staffanson was born on October 1, 1960, in Richland County, Montana. Growing up on his family’s farm, Staffanson went to college at Montana State University, graduating in 1982.

== 2012 election ==
Staffanson ran for election in the 2012 Montana House of Representatives election, but withdrew on June 5, 2012, and joined David Halvorson’s campaign as its campaign manager.

== Taking office ==
Staffanson was appointed to the Montana House of Representatives on August 19, 2013, by a vote of Richland and Dawson County lawmakers after the death of David Halvorson.

== 2014 election ==
Staffanson ran unopposed in the Republican Party primary and won the election with a margin of almost 60% of the vote.

2014 Montana House of Representatives 35th District election
Party	Candidate	Votes	%
Republican	Scott Staffanson	2,612	79.5
Democratic	Rob Knotts	674	20.5

== 2016 election ==
In the 2016 election, Staffanson easily defeated Joel Krautter in the primary and defeated Chris Trumpower in the election.

2016 Montana House of Representatives 35th District Primary
Party	Candidate	Votes	%
Republican	Scott Staffanson	1,127	59.98
Republican	Joel Krautter	752	40.02

2016 Montana House of Representatives 35th District election
Party	Candidate	Votes	%
Republican	Scott Staffanson	3,825	81.26
Democratic	Chris Trumpower	882	18.74
