= Kirk Wagoner =

American politician

Kirk Wagoner also known as Kirk B. Wagoner is an American politician. He served from 2013 to 2018 as a Republican member of the Montana House of Representatives, where he represented House District 75, including Montana City, Montana, Clancy, Montana, Boulder, Montana, Whitehall, Montana.
