= John Fleming (Montana politician) =

American politician

Member of the Montana House of Representatives from the 93rd district
- In office 2017–2019
- Succeeded by: Joe Read

Personal details
- Party: Democratic

John Fleming is an American politician. He was a member of the Montana House of Representatives.
