= Erin Reed =

American journalist and activist (born 1988/1989)

- Born: 1988 or 1989 (age 37–38); Louisiana, U.S.
- Education: Louisiana State University
- Occupations: Journalist, transgender rights activist
- Notable work: Erin in the Morning
- Spouse: Zooey Zephyr (m. 2024)

Substack information
- Newsletter: Erin In The Morning
- Topic: LGBT-related legislation
- Subscribers: 123k

TikTok information
- Page: Erin Reed
- Followers: 467.5K
- Last updated: September 6, 2025
- Website: erinreedwrites.com

Erin Reed (born 1988 or 1989) is an American journalist and transgender rights activist. She writes a newsletter titled Erin in the Morning, with over 120,000 subscribers as of September 2025.

== Gender clinic map ==
Reed began researching gender transition when she was 13, but she did not pursue it until her early 30s, not knowing how to navigate healthcare options. In 2019, Reed created a popular Google map of informed consent clinics, clinics which help transgender people access care, such as hormones, with reduced overhead. Reed was inspired to create it after spending too long looking for clinics and learning that her nearest suitable clinic was more than three hours away.

In 2021, her data was used by anti-trans activists to harass healthcare providers on the list, motivated by their thought of it facilitating children's access to medical transition.

== Career ==
Reed worked as a digital director for The American Independent (formerly known as Shareblue) from 2016 until 2021.

After 2021, Reed worked as a transgender rights blogger. She publishes the newsletter Erin in the Morning, focusing on legislation that impacts LGBTQ, and often specifically transgender, people. Reed began working on her newsletter full time in 2022. The same year, Reed published a map tracking US states that had the most and least legislative protection for transgender individuals. She has updated the map as new laws are proposed and passed. Reed was awarded 2024's Outstanding Blog at the GLAAD Media Awards.

== Personal life ==
Reed was raised in southern Louisiana, and she now lives in Montgomery County, Maryland. Reed has a son.

In 2022, Reed started a long-distance relationship with Montana state representative Zooey Zephyr. They were engaged in 2023 after Zephyr proposed at a local gay prom. In 2023, the couple was targeted in failed swatting attempts. Reed credited local police for stopping the incident.

Reed and Zephyr were married in December 2024. The wedding ceremony was officiated by GLAAD president Sarah Kate Ellis.

In 2024, Reed endorsed Kamala Harris in the 2024 United States presidential election. She highlighted in public appearances that Donald Trump's re-election campaign devoted significant funding towards anti-transgender advertising. She emphasizes the importance of local elections specifically.
