= Dale L. Mortensen =

American politician (1966–2020)

Member of the Montana House of Representatives from the 44th district
- In office January 5, 2015 – January 29, 2020
- Preceded by: Jonathan McNiven
- Succeeded by: Larry Brewster

Personal details
- Born: October 14, 1966 Helena, Montana, U.S.
- Died: January 29, 2020 (aged 53) Billings, Montana, U.S.
- Party: Republican
- Spouse: Kelly
- Children: 1
- Education: Montana State University
- Profession: Businessman

Dale Lee Mortensen (October 14, 1966 – January 29, 2020) was an American politician. A Republican, he served in the Montana House of Representatives from 2015 until his death in 2020. A graduate of Montana State University, he lived in Billings, Montana. He served in the police and sheriff's offices as a law enforcement officer. Mortensen owned and operated a private investigation business. He was a field representative for Montana Congressman Denny Rehberg. Mortensen died on January 29, 2020, in Billings and was 53 years old.
