= Roy Hollandsworth =

American politician

Member of the Montana House of Representatives from the 27th district
- In office 2008 to 2016
- Succeeded by: James O'Hara

Personal details
- Born: 1942 (age 83–84)
- Party: Republican

Roy Hollandsworth (born 1942) was a Republican member of the Montana Legislature. In 2008, he was elected to House District 28 which represents the Gallatin County area. After the 2010 census he was reassigned to District 27.
