= Peggy Webb (politician) =

American educator, librarian, and politician from Montana

Member of the Montana House of Representatives from the 43rd district
- In office January 2, 2017 – January 4, 2021
- Preceded by: Clayton Fiscus
- Succeeded by: Kerri Seekins-Crowe

Personal details
- Born: Nebraska, U.S.
- Party: Republican
- Parents: Harold Eugene Moore (father); Marian Moore (nee Copeland) (mother)
- Occupation: Educator, librarian and politician

Peggy Webb is an American educator, politician, and businesswoman from Montana. Webb served two terms as a Republican member of the Montana House of Representatives from District 43 from 2017 to 2021.

== Early life ==
Webb was born in Nebraska, U.S. Webb's father was Harold Eugene Moore (1929-2014) and her mother was Marian Moore (nee Copeland) (1932-2020). In 1971, Webb graduated from Bartley High School, which is presently Southwest High School.

== Career ==
Prior to her legislative service, Webb was a math teacher, librarian, and a businesswoman. Webb became a real estate developer in Billings, Montana.

=== Elections ===
On November 8, 2016, Webb in the election and became a Republican member of Montana House of Representatives for District 43. Webb defeated Elizabeth Pincolini and Josh Daniels with 57.26% of the votes. On November 6, 2018, as an incumbent, Webb won the election and continued serving District 43. Webb defeated Blair Koch with 64.90% of the votes.

== Awards ==
- 2017 Honorable Mention. Presented by Montana Farm Bureau Federation.

== Personal life ==
Webb's husband is Roger Webb, who served in the Montana Senate during the 2013, 2015, 2017 and 2019 legislative sessions. They have two daughters. Webb and her family live in Park City, Montana.
