= Marilyn J. Ryan =

Member of the Montana House of Representatives

Marilyn Ryan

Member of the Montana House of Representatives from the 99th district
- In office January 2, 2017 – January 4, 2021
- Preceded by: Tom Steenberg
- Succeeded by: Mark Thane

Personal details
- Born: June 13, 1945 (age 81) Anaconda, Montana
- Party: Democratic
- Spouse: Patrick
- Education: University of Montana
- Profession: Teacher

Marilyn J. Ryan (born June 13, 1945) is a Democratic member of the Montana House of Representatives. She has served the 99th district, which encompasses southwest portions of Missoula, since January 2017.

== Early life, education and career ==
Ryan was born in Anaconda, Montana. She moved to Missoula in 1968 to attend college at the University of Montana where she received her B.A. in Political Science and her M.A. in Education.

After graduating, Ryan entered the Missoula County Public School System as a teacher of social studies, history and government for middle and high school students, a post she would hold for almost three decades. During that tenure, she utilized her training as a state director in law-related education, specifically Indian law to instruct teachers for the Constitution Rights Foundation and coordinate a U.S. Department of Education History Grant that funded education for Missoula history teachers.

Upon retirement, she served 5 years as President of the Montana Education Association and 4 years as a field consultant for the MEA-MFT, later sitting on Montana's Teacher's Retirement Board as well as its Board of Investments.

Her non-education related public service activity has included work for Kiwanis, United Way and the Moose Can Gully Leadership Team.

== Montana House of Representatives ==
Ryan is the only freshman Democrat (out of 4) on the Appropriations Committee, a coveted spot. She is also a member of the Health and Human Services.

== Electoral history ==
She ran her 2016 campaign on an education tax credit as well as support for alternative energy projects moving forward and an infrastructure bill in 2017. Her endorsements included MEA-MFT, Carol's List and Montana Conservation Voters.

Election	Political result	Candidate	Party	Votes	%
Montana's 99th House District primary election, 2016	Democratic win	Marylin Ryan	Democratic	1,451	81.84
Montana's 99th House District primary election, 2016	Democratic win	Greg Strandberg	Democratic	322	18.16
Montana's 99th House District election, 2016	Democratic win	Marylin Ryan	Democratic	3,101	59.69
Montana's 99th House District election, 2016	Democratic win	Susan Cundiff	Republican	2,094	40.31

== Personal life ==
Ryan married her husband Patrick on August 15, 1964.
