= Kerry White =

American politician

Member of the Montana House of Representatives from the 64th district
- In office January 7, 2013 – January 4, 2021
- Succeeded by: Jane Gillette

Personal details
- Born: 1954 (age 71–72)
- Party: Republican

Kerry E. White (born 1954) is an American politician who served as a member of the Montana House of Representatives for the 64th district from 2013 to 2021. He is a member of the Republican party.
