= John Fuller (Montana politician) =

American educator and politician from Montana

Member of the Montana House of Representatives from the 8th district
- Incumbent
- Assumed office January 5, 2019
- Preceded by: Steve Lavin

Personal details
- Party: Republican
- Spouse: Cynthia Fuller
- Children: 1
- Education: Northern Illinois University, (BA); National Louis University, (M.Ed)
- Occupation: Educator, politician
- Website: fullerhd8.com

Military service
- Allegiance: United States
- Branch/service: United States Army
- Years of service: 1967-1971
- Rank: Staff Sergeant

John D. Fuller is an American educator and politician who is a member of the Montana Senate. Fuller was a Republican member of Montana House of Representatives for District 8.

== Education ==
Fuller earned a Bachelor of Arts degree from Northern Illinois University. Fuller earned a Master of Science degree in Education from National Louis University.

== Career ==
Fuller served in the United States Army from 1967 until 1971. Fuller is a Vietnam veteran who obtained the rank of Staff Sergeant.

In 1972, Fuller became a high school teacher at Wheaton Central High School in Wheaton, Illinois. Fuller was also a wrestling head coach at Wheaton Central High School. In 1996, Fuller became a high school teacher at Flathead High School in Kalispell, Montana until 2009. In 2001, Fuller served as a member of the Montana State Board of Public Education, until 2008.

On November 6, 2018, Fuller won the election and became a Republican member of Montana House of Representatives for District 8. Fuller defeated Sid Daoud with 68.65% of the votes.

Fuller serves as the chairman of Flathead County Republican Party Central Committee in Montana.

In a February 2022 op-ed for the Flathead Beacon, Fuller wrote that "[d]emocracy is a methodology of government that has failed as miserably as socialism."

== Personal life ==
Fuller's wife is Cynthia Fuller. They have one son. Fuller and his family live in Whitefish, Montana.

== See also ==
- Montana House of Representatives, District 8
