= Kim Abbott =

American politician

Minority Leader of the Montana House of Representatives
- In office January 4, 2021 – January 6, 2025
- Preceded by: Casey Schreiner
- Succeeded by: Katie Sullivan

Member of the Montana House of Representatives from the 83rd district
- In office January 2, 2017 – January 6, 2025
- Preceded by: Chuck Hunter
- Succeeded by: Jill Cohenour (redistricted)

Personal details
- Born: 1979 (age 46–47) Cleveland, Ohio, U.S.
- Party: Democratic
- Domestic partner: Tara Veazy
- Education: University of North Carolina, Wilmington (BA)

Kim Abbott is an American politician. She has served as a Democratic member of the Montana House of Representatives for District 83 since 2017. Following the 2020 Montana House of Representatives election, she was selected as the House Minority Leader for the term beginning 2021.

From 2013 to 2021, Abbott served as co-director of the Montana Human Rights Network. She is openly lesbian.

Montana House of Representatives
Preceded by Casey Schreiner	Minority Leader of the Montana House of Representatives; 2021–2025	Succeeded by Katie Sullivan
