= Boneau, Montana =

- Census-designated place
- Location of Boneau, Montana
- Coordinates: 48°17′37″N 109°52′15″W
- Country: United States
- State: Montana
- County: Chouteau

Area
  - Total: 2.47 sq mi (6.41 km^{2})
  - Land: 2.37 sq mi (6.15 km^{2})
  - Water: 0.10 sq mi (0.26 km^{2})
- Elevation: 3,242 ft (988 m)

Population (2020)
  - Total: 365
  - Density: 153.8/sq mi (59.37/km^{2})
- Time zone: UTC-7 (Mountain (MST))
  - Summer (DST): UTC-6 (MDT)
- Area code: 406
- FIPS code: 30-08162
- GNIS feature ID: 2407881

Boneau is a census-designated place (CDP) in Chouteau County, Montana, United States. As of the 2020 census, Boneau had a population of 365.

== Geography ==
Boneau is located in northeastern Chouteau County and is part of the Rocky Boy's Indian Reservation of the Chippewa-Cree Tribe and is bordered to the east by the CDP of Sangrey in Hill County. It is located at the western edge of the Bear Paw Mountains and is 8 miles (13 km) east of the town of Box Elder and U.S. Route 87.

According to the United States Census Bureau, the Boneau CDP has a total area of 2.45 square miles (6.35 km^{2}), of which 2.35 square miles (6.09 km^{2}) is land and 0.10 square miles (0.26 km^{2}), or 4.09%, is water. Boneau Reservoir on Boxelder Creek is in the northeast corner of the CDP. Boxelder Creek flows west to Big Sandy Creek, a tributary of the Milk River.

== Demographics ==
Historical population
Census	Pop.	Note	%±
2020	365		—
U.S. Decennial Census

As of the census of 2000, there were 190 people, 42 households, and 40 families residing in the CDP. The population density was 82.8 inhabitants per square mile (32.0/km^{2}). There were 42 housing units at an average density of 18.3 per square mile (7.1/km^{2}). The racial makeup of the CDP was 2.63% White and 97.37% Native American. Hispanic and Latino account for 0.53% of the population.

There are 42 households, out of which 83.3% had children under the age of 18 living with them, 54.8% were married couples living together, 35.7% had a female householder with no husband present, and 2.4% were non-families. 2.4% of all households were made up of individuals, and none had someone living alone who was 65 years of age or older. The average household size was 4.52 and the average family size was 4.39.

In the CDP, the population was spread out, with 56.3% under the age of 18, 5.3% from 18 to 24, 31.1% from 25 to 44, 5.8% from 45 to 64, and 1.6% who were 65 years of age or older. The median age was 13 years. For every 100 females, there were 95.9 males. For every 100 females age 18 and over, there were 76.6 males.

The median income for a household in the CDP was $21,750, and the median income for a family was $19,688. Males had a median income of $26,250 versus $30,313 for females. The per capita income for the CDP was $5,200. About 51.2% of families and 44.0% of the population were below the poverty line, including 47.6% of those under the age of eighteen and none of those 65 or over.

== Education ==
Boneau is the location of Stone Child College.
