= St. Pierre, Montana =

- Census-designated place
- Location of St. Pierre, Montana
- Coordinates: 48°15′06″N 109°48′50″W
- Country: United States
- State: Montana
- County: Hill

Area
  - Total: 8.08 sq mi (20.92 km^{2})
  - Land: 8.08 sq mi (20.92 km^{2})
  - Water: 0 sq mi (0.00 km^{2})
- Elevation: 4,114 ft (1,254 m)

Population (2020)
  - Total: 364
  - Density: 45/sq mi (17.4/km^{2})
- Time zone: UTC-7 (Mountain (MST))
  - Summer (DST): UTC-6 (MDT)
- Area code: 406
- FIPS code: 30-65537
- GNIS feature ID: 2409232

St. Pierre or Saint Pierre is a census-designated place (CDP) in Hill County, Montana, United States, within the Rocky Boy Indian Reservation. As of the 2020 census, St. Pierre had a population of 364.

== Geography ==
St. Pierre is located in southeastern Hill County on the northwestern edge of the Bears Paw Mountains. It is bordered to the south and west by Chouteau County, to the north by Sangrey, and to the east by Rocky Boy's Agency. It is 29 miles (47 km) south of Havre, the Hill County seat, and 12 miles (19 km) southeast of Box Elder.

According to the United States Census Bureau, the St. Pierre CDP has a total area of 8.1 square miles (20.9 km^{2}), all land.

== Demographics ==
Historical population
| Census | Pop. | Note | %± |
|---|---|---|---|
| 2020 | 364 | | — |
U.S. Decennial Census

As of the census of 2000, there were 289 people, 76 households, and 69 families residing in the CDP. The population density was 35.8 inhabitants per square mile (13.8/km^{2}). There were 80 housing units at an average density of 9.9/sq mi (3.8/km^{2}). The racial makeup of the CDP was 1.73% White, 0.35% African American, 97.58% Native American, and 0.35% from two or more races. Hispanic or Latino of any race were 0.35% of the population.

There were 76 households, out of which 52.6% had children under the age of 18 living with them, 50.0% were married couples living together, 25.0% had a female householder with no husband present, and 9.2% were non-families. 9.2% of all households were made up of individuals, and none had someone living alone who was 65 years of age or older. The average household size was 3.80 and the average family size was 3.91.

In the CDP, the population was spread out, with 38.8% under the age of 18, 10.0% from 18 to 24, 26.0% from 25 to 44, 19.0% from 45 to 64, and 6.2% who were 65 years of age or older. The median age was 26 years. For every 100 females, there were 107.9 males. For every 100 females age 18 and over, there were 103.4 males.

The median income for a household in the CDP was $40,750, and the median income for a family was $26,875. Males had a median income of $27,083 versus $26,917 for females. The per capita income for the CDP was $9,437. About 28.4% of families and 28.9% of the population were below the poverty line, including 36.8% of those under the age of eighteen and none of those 65 or over.
