= Rocky Boy, Montana =

Rocky Boy, Montana may refer to:

- Rocky Boy West, Montana, in Hill and Choteau Counties
- Rocky Boy's Agency, Montana, in Hill County
- Rocky Boy Indian Reservation, in Hill and Choteau Counties
