= KHEW =

- Rocky Boy Reservation, Montana; United States
- Frequency: 88.5 MHz
- Branding: The Voice of the Chippewa Cree Nation

Programming
- Format: Community radio

Ownership
- Owner: Chippewa Cree Tribe of the Rocky Boy's Reservation

History
- First air date: 2008

Technical information
- Licensing authority: FCC
- Facility ID: 173443
- Class: C1
- ERP: 16,000 watts
- HAAT: 481.2 meters (1,579 ft)
- Transmitter coordinates: 48°10′41.9″N 109°41′23.7″W

Links
- Public license information: Public file; LMS

KHEW (88.5 FM) is a Community radio station, owned and operated by the Chippewa Cree Tribe of the Rocky Boy's Reservation. The station is licensed to the Rocky Boy's Reservation in Montana.

== See also ==
- List of community radio stations in the United States
- Rocky Boy's Indian Reservation
- Chippewa Cree tribe
- Federal Communications Commission
