= Plain Green Loans =

Plain Green Loans, LLC
- Company type: Private
- Industry: Financial services
- Headquarters: Montana, United States
- Products: Payday lending
- Owner: Chippewa Cree Tribe
- Website: www.plaingreenloans.com

Plain Green Loans is an online installment loan company providing emergency cash via the internet. It is a Tribal Lending Enterprise owned by the Chippewa Cree Tribe on the Rocky Boy Indian Reservation.

== History ==
In 2011, Plain Green Loans issued over 121,000 loans. Because the Chippewa Cree Tribe is a sovereign nation which enjoys tribal immunity, it is not subject to state laws which seek to prevent usury by regulating high-interest lending.

In February 2012, a coalition of Indian tribes welcomed a Colorado court ruling that tribal immunity has no territorial boundaries.

In 2014, several members of the tribe were convicted of illegally siphoning seven percent of the company's revenues which totaled $25 million over a three-year period.

In January 2018, there was a successful settlement was reported between Plain Green Loans and BEH Gaming Ltd related to loans to the Chippewa Cree Tribe and Chippewa Cree Tribe Development Corporation. The settlement and Plain Green's payment of the debt to BEH releases the Chippewa Cree Tribe and Chippewa Cree Tribe Development Corporation from all liability. The agreement settles a lawsuit filed by Florida-based BEH Gaming Ltd in 2014 (Case # DV-14-142 in the 12th Judicial District Court in Hill County, Montana) to repay loans to expand Northern Winz Hotel and Casino.

== Operations ==
Plain Green has a B rating with the Better Business Bureau"
