= Rocky Boy Public Schools =

Location
- 81 Mission Taylor Road; Rocky Boy, Montana; United States
- Coordinates: 48°15′26″N 109°47′03″W

Information
- Type: PublicWP:WPSCH/AG
- School district: Rocky Boy School District 87 J & L
- Teaching staff: 10.05 (FTE)
- Grades: 9-12
- Enrollment: 146 (2023–2024)
- Student to teacher ratio: 14.53
- Campus: Rural
- Colors: Maroon and Gold
- Athletics: Football, Cross Country, Basketball, Volleyball, Track, Golf
- Mascot: Northern Stars and Morning Stars
- Yearbook: Galaxy
- Website: http://www.rockyboy.k12.mt.us

Rocky Boy Public Schools is an elementary, junior high and high school with grades K through 12 on the Rocky Boy Indian Reservation located in Hill County, Montana, USA.

As of 2014 the student body is 99% Native American and 1% of other ethnicity.

== See also ==
- List of high schools in Montana
- Rocky Boy Indian Reservation
