= Sangrey, Montana =

- Census-designated place
- Location of Sangrey, Montana
- Coordinates: 48°16′54″N 109°49′00″W
- Country: United States
- State: Montana
- County: Hill

Area
  - Total: 6.31 sq mi (16.35 km^{2})
  - Land: 6.31 sq mi (16.35 km^{2})
  - Water: 0 sq mi (0.00 km^{2})
- Elevation: 3,379 ft (1,030 m)

Population (2020)
  - Total: 316
  - Density: 50.1/sq mi (19.33/km^{2})
- Time zone: UTC-7 (Mountain (MST))
  - Summer (DST): UTC-6 (MDT)
- Area code: 406
- FIPS code: 30-66212
- GNIS feature ID: 2409273

Sangrey is a census-designated place (CDP) in Hill County, Montana, United States. As of the 2020 census, Sangrey had a population of 316.

== Geography ==
Sangrey is located in southeastern Hill County within the Rocky Boy Indian Reservation. The CDP is bordered to the north by Azure, to the east by Rocky Boy's Agency, and to the south by St. Pierre, all in Hill County, and to the west by Boneau in Chouteau County.

According to the United States Census Bureau, the Sangrey CDP has a total area of 6.3 square miles (16.4 km^{2}), all land.

== Demographics ==
Historical population
Census	Pop.	Note	%±
2020	316		—
U.S. Decennial Census

As of the census of 2000, there were 263 people, 69 households, and 60 families residing in the CDP. The population density was 41.6 inhabitants per square mile (16.1/km^{2}). There were 77 housing units at an average density of 12.2/sq mi (4.7/km^{2}). The racial makeup of the CDP was 0.76% White, 95.82% Native American, 0.38% Asian, and 3.04% from two or more races. Hispanic or Latino of any race were 2.28% of the population.

There were 69 households, out of which 50.7% had children under the age of 18 living with them, 46.4% were married couples living together, 29.0% had a female householder with no husband present, and 13.0% were non-families. 11.6% of all households were made up of individuals, and 1.4% had someone living alone who was 65 years of age or older. The average household size was 3.81 and the average family size was 4.10.

In the CDP, the population was spread out, with 42.6% under the age of 18, 11.0% from 18 to 24, 26.6% from 25 to 44, 15.2% from 45 to 64, and 4.6% who were 65 years of age or older. The median age was 23 years. For every 100 females, there were 92.0 males. For every 100 females age 18 and over, there were 96.1 males.

The median income for a household in the CDP was $20,089, and the median income for a family was $20,446. Males had a median income of $35,417 versus $30,313 for females. The per capita income for the CDP was $6,519. About 54.0% of families and 57.3% of the population were below the poverty line, including 70.2% of those under the age of eighteen and 33.3% of those 65 or over.
