= Azure, Montana =

- Census-designated place
- Location of Azure, Montana
- Coordinates: 48°18′24″N 109°47′06″W
- Country: United States
- State: Montana
- County: Hill

Area
  - Total: 4.50 sq mi (11.65 km^{2})
  - Land: 4.50 sq mi (11.65 km^{2})
  - Water: 0 sq mi (0.00 km^{2})
- Elevation: 3,570 ft (1,090 m)

Population (2020)
  - Total: 314
  - Density: 69.8/sq mi (26.96/km^{2})
- Time zone: UTC-7 (Mountain (MST))
  - Summer (DST): UTC-6 (MDT)
- Area code: 406
- FIPS code: 30-03212
- GNIS feature ID: 2407790

Azure is a census-designated place (CDP) in Hill County, Montana, United States. As of the 2020 census, Azure had a population of 314.

== Geography ==
Azure is located in southeastern Hill County within the Rocky Boy Indian Reservation. It is bordered to the south by the Sangrey CDP. It is 11 miles (18 km) east of Box Elder and U.S. Route 87.

According to the United States Census Bureau, the Azure CDP has a total area of 4.5 square miles (11.7 km^{2}), all land.

== Demographics ==
Historical population
Census	Pop.	Note	%±
2000	253		—
2010	286		13.0%
2020	314		9.8%
U.S. Decennial Census

As of the census of 2000, there were 253 people, 55 households, and 47 families residing in the CDP. The population density was 56.7 inhabitants per square mile (21.9/km^{2}). There were 59 housing units at an average density of 13.2 per square mile (5.1/km^{2}). The racial makeup of the CDP was 2.77% White, 95.26% Native American, and 1.98% from two or more races. Hispanic or Latino of any race were 0.40% of the population.

There were 55 households, out of which 49.1% had children under the age of 18 living with them, 45.5% were married couples living together, 25.5% had a female householder with no husband present, and 14.5% were non-families. 12.7% of all households were made up of individuals, and 1.8% had someone living alone who was 65 years of age or older. The average household size was 4.60 and the average family size was 5.04.

In the CDP, the population was spread out, with 42.3% under the age of 18, 18.6% from 18 to 24, 21.7% from 25 to 44, 13.4% from 45 to 64, and 4.0% who were 65 years of age or older. The median age was 20 years. For every 100 females, there were 110.8 males. For every 100 females age 18 and over, there were 102.8 males.

The median income for a household in the CDP was $19,821, and the median income for a family was $26,250. Males had a median income of $27,614 versus $26,250 for females. The per capita income for the CDP was $5,407. About 28.3% of families and 32.4% of the population were below the poverty line, including 35.3% of those under the age of eighteen and none of those 65 or over.
