= Asiniiwin =

Ojibwe leader who helped establish a reservation

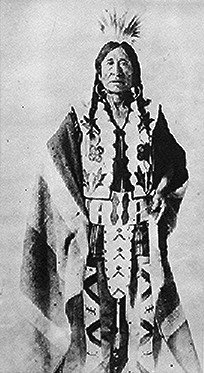
Rocky Boy (Stone Child), an Ojibwe chief

Asiniiwin, translated Rocky Boy or Stone Child, was an important Ojibwe leader who was chief of a band in Montana in the late 19th century and early 20th century. His advocacy for his people helped gain the establishment of what is called Rocky Boy's Indian Reservation in his honor. Formed from part of Fort Assiniboine, which was closed, it is located in Hill and Chouteau counties in north central Montana.

== Early life ==
Not much is known about Asiniiwin's early life. Some speculate he was born and raised in Wisconsin, and migrated to the Montana region later on, as did many Ojibwe. However, written historical records prove he was a native to Montana. He told a companion he was Ojibwe and born somewhere between Anaconda, Butte, and Deer Lodge. He was the son of Chief Bobtail aka Alexis Piche Bobtail. His birth date was probably in either 1851 or 1852.

== Rise to power ==
=== 1864 Pembina Treaty ===
As a young man, Asiniwiin was a member of the band led by Monsomos (Moose Dung) or Red Robe, a signor of the 1864 Pembina treaty. Upon the death of Monsomos, Rocky Boy emerged as the dominant leader of this band.

=== 1889 Red Lake Agreement ===
Although Chief Rocky Boy signed the 1889 Red Lake Agreement, his rights to the Red Lake nation have never been upheld. His lateral descendants are now working to reverse the exclusion of Rocky Boy's people from their Pembina homeland. Chief Rocky Boy and his family possess interests, rights and the right to be simultaneously enrolled in the Red Lake Nation per his status as a treaty signor, and upon the Rocky Boy Reservation.

=== 1892 McCumber Agreement ===
In addressing the inequities of the .10 Cent treaty, the federal government held that Rocky Boy descendants were entitled to receive proceeds of the Pembina Judgments, resulting from the litigation that challenged the unjust payment of .10 / acre that the government paid in 1864. Chief Rocky Boy's original people, many of whom did not receive this payment, still do not accept the terms of treaty.

=== Illegal land sale of Thief River Falls, Minnesota ===
In 1900 to 1904, the U.S. government sold up to 100,000 acres of land out from under the Rocky Boy Band, an example of extreme malfeasance, that had been set aside for the former Monsomos Band, now Chief Rocky Boy's band. The allotting agent, James McLaughlin held a formal land sale of this land in Thief River Falls, Minnesota. Rocky Boy's people never received the sale of this land; the million dollars from this land sale was distributed as a per capita to the Red Lake Nation.

Rocky Boy lived primarily in southwestern and western Montana. He was fond of the Great Falls, Montana, region. Rocky Boy led a band of about 130 men, women and children. Other Ojibwe had settled on reservations of other tribes through no fault of their own. He worked to keep the Ojibwe tribal identity alive in Montana, at a time when more whites were settling the land, and expected the Indians to disappear.

Many of Chief Rocky Boy's people failed to understand the implications of their true sovereign attributes and endured many decades with lack of access to an education. Ironically, this is the very reason Chief Rocky Boy petitioned for a homeland after the illegal sale of his 100,000 acres in Thief River, Minnesota. In 1902, in a letter to President Theodore Roosevelt, he petitioned for a reservation and a chance to educate his people.

== Sub-chiefs ==
Rocky Boy was the principal leader of the Montana Ojibwe people. Other leaders who followed or worked with Rocky Boy were located around Montana. Some lived on other Montana reservations and tried to get the Ojibwe of those Montana reservations tribal recognition within these locations.

- Little Bear was a principal leader of some Cree people in western Canada, leading them to Montana as refugees after Riel's Rebellion.
- Buffalo Coat was an important Ojibwe leader in the Great Falls region, including the regions around Fort Shaw, Montana, and to Fort Benton, Montana. In 1898 he asked for land and citizenship for the landless Ojibwe in the Great Falls region. The United States refused to grant Buffalo Coat's people land and citizenship. The United States claimed they had no jurisdiction and, thus, were not capable of granting Buffalo Coat any land.
- Ka-na-bay-zhic-um, or Long Hair, was the chief of the landless Ojibwe who lived near the Marias River, which is located north of Great Falls near present-day Loma, Montana, and Fort Benton. It includes land near the Blackfeet Indian Reservation and the Sweet Grass Hills.
- Kah-keesh-ka-wash-chah-bay-wo was the principal leader of the landless Ojibwe on the Crow-Northern Cheyenne Reservation and the immediate region around the Billings, Montana, region. He may have played a role in the attempt by the Cheyenne to break off the Northern Cheyenne Reservation in 1897.
- Lucky Man was affiliated with Little Bear. He was probably native to western Montana or north central Montana. He fled up to Alberta and Saskatchewan around the time of the 1877 Nez Perce exodus with Little Bear. He returned to Montana with Little Bear.

Many others, including Rain of the Bow, Mah-chop, Pay-pah-mi-show-ait, and Nan-ome-sha, were also sub-chiefs. Each man led anywhere from 25 to 200 or more landless Ojibwe, in Montana, Idaho and elsewhere. Each of them kept in contact with Rocky Boy to learn of any news of the establishment of new Ojibwe reservations. Their goal was to keep the Ojibwe tribal identity alive.

== Struggle for an Ojibwe Reservation ==
Rocky Boy was forced off the Red Lake Reservation although he was a signatory of the 1889 Red Lake agreement. The Interior Agent James McLaughlin was a plague to Chief Rocky Boy's existence. McLaughlin would engineer the dispossession of Rocky Boy's Band on two occasions, in the late 1880s out of the Thief River Falls area; McLaughlin sold land right out from under the band. He would also dispossess the band through illegal imposition of the McLaughlin Roll that contained 451 names for approval for final enrollment. Of those 451 names, only 45 were actual biological Ojibwe descendants.

Rocky Boy could travel the following railroads for free: B.A. & P; Oregon Short Line; Rio Grande Western; and Southern Pacific Railroad. Rocky Boy had letters of recommendation from the governor of Idaho, as well as an Idaho District Judge, and several affluent citizens of Pocatello, which is next to the Fort Hall Reservation. He also had many letters of recommendation from many affluent people from Utah. He was obviously sought after in those locations to help the Ojibwe living there, relocate to reservations.

In 1902, Rocky Boy commenced negotiating for a new Ojibwe reservation in Montana. He had several supporters among the whites, including Senator Joseph M. Dixon. Rocky Boy sent a letter to the President of the United States requesting a reservation. Rocky Boy's original band census, reflecting 139 men, women and children, was taken by Thralls B. Wheat at the order of the Secretary of the Department of the Interior. This roll was taken in 1908, and certified in 1909, Washington, D.C.

=== Proposed 1904 Flathead Reservation ===
In 1904, the government of the United States debated over finding a home for the Ojibwe of Montana on the Flathead Reservation, but the bill was not ratified. Rocky Boy was obviously upset about the failure and those Ojibwe living on the Flathead Reservation, even more so. They would continue to live on the Flathead Reservation as Rocky Boy continued the quest to find a new Reservation for the landless Ojibwe of Montana. The Chippewa of the Flathead Reservation were not the only tribe to be forced by the United States to assimilate among the Kutenai and Bitterroot Salish, so were the Nez Perce. Though the attempt by Rocky Boy to preserve the Ojibwe tribal status on the Flathead Reservation failed, today more than 100 Ojibwe are still retaining their Anishinabe identity on the Flathead Reservation.

=== The 1908 Swan Valley Massacre ===
In late 1908, the United States learned that small groups of Ojibwe living on the Flathead Reservation had left the Reservation to hunt in the adjoining Swan Valley. In response, the United States sent a game warden and several deputized citizens, to the Swan Valley to find the hunters. They found one small group and requested from them, their hunting licenses which they provided. Though they had legal permission to hunt, the game warden told them he would return the next day and if they had not left the Swan Valley they would be arrested. He returned the next day shooting instead of negotiating. In the battle that followed four Ojibwe were killed and the game warden also. To ease the unrest the Ojibwe felt about the Land Acts to open up the Flathead and Fort Peck Reservations to white settlement, the United States sent Indian Inspector Frank Churchill to Montana to negotiate with Rocky Boy in that same year of 1908.

=== The Valley County, Montana Ojibwe Reservation ===
In 1908, Frank Churchill met and negotiated with Rocky Boy. Rocky Boy told him that Ojibwe were living all over Montana including on the Blackfeet Reservation, Crow Reservation, Fort Peck Reservation, and the Flathead Reservation, and near white settlements such as Anaconda, Billings, Butte, Deer Lodge, Garrison (Ulm), Havre, Glasgow, Great Falls, Helena, Missoula and many others. In an attempt to ease the fears of the Ojibwe of western Montana and Idaho (Coeur d'Alene Reservation and the defunct Lemhi Reservation), Churchill requested from the government of the United States that all of Valley County, Montana, be withdrawn from white settlement and a new Ojibwe Reservation be set aside in the same said county, covering near 1.4 million acres. Both requests were granted. However, many of the Ojibwe from western Montana and Idaho (Coeur d'Alene Reservation and the Lemhi Reservation), were not willing to make the journey and they were charged high rates by railroad owners apparently and that ended that quest. Churchill knew the problem was not over.

=== The relocation to the Blackfeet Reservation ===
Representatives from the United States continued to negotiate with Rocky Boy after the Valley County, Montana Ojibwe reservation quest. Many Ojibwe were still landless and living near many white settlements and on the Coeur d'Alene Reservation and Flathead Reservation. Many were also living on the Blackfeet Reservation. In 1909, Rocky Boy reached an agreement with the United States for a new home for the landless Ojibwe from western Montana and Idaho, on the Blackfeet Reservation, between St. Mary, Babb, and the Canada–US border.

They were relocated there in November 1909. Many did not like it and commenced to leave the Blackfeet Reservation. However, Rocky Boy remained with about 50 Ojibwe.

== The establishment of the Rocky Boy Reservation ==
Many Ojibwe and the Cree under Little Bear's leadership were still landless in 1910. Little Bear had no choice but to follow Rocky Boy as a result of the US Government's decision he and his subjects were Canadian Cree. Many Ojibwe living on the Coeur d'Alene Reservation and Flathead Reservation continued to keep in contact with both Rocky Boy and Little Bear, as they continued the quest to find a reservation in Montana. Finally in 1916, the United States established the Rocky Boy Reservation. Rocky Boy did not live to see the establishment of the joint Chippewa-Cree Reservation. Many claim he was assassinated. After news of the establishment of the new reservation was learned of by the landless Ojibwe and Cree, they commenced to relocate to the new Reservation.

=== The exodus to Great Falls ===
Pursuant to the Worcester v. Georgia precedent 31, US 515, (1832), the Ojibwe recognized in Act of September 7, 1916 (39 Stat. 739) were to be the sole sovereign tribe to exert exclusive jurisdiction over their newly created reservation. The federal government would oversee the wholesale destruction of the Rocky Boy Band of Chippewa Indians by implementing the 1917 McLaughlin Roll. Through federal abuse of power, overreach, and outright incompetence, the original Ojibwe band members enumerated in the 1908 census were improperly removed from the tribal roll. As a result, and due in large part, to the Cree malfeasance and contest for power, the majority of Chief Rocky Boy's people were illegally dispossessed from their own tribe. Many sought refuge on Hill 57, Great Falls. In later years, the Secretary of Interior would illegally deny a trust responsibility to the tribal members residing there. Hill 57 was initially settled by Jim Loud Thunder Gopher, who was a hard worker, and honest Ojibwe leader of Saginaw descent. Jim Gopher had arrived from Manitou Lake in 1918, where he also enjoyed treaty rights in the nation of Canada. Jim Gopher was the son-in-law of Chief Rocky Boy's brother, Charles Chippewa or Walking Stone. Hill 57 was and is the historic home to Chief Rocky Boy's people, and the people of Jim Gopher. The land ownership of Hill 57 is a checkerboard of these people, in addition to many of the Little Shell, landless Indians who had briefly settled on Hill 57 until the 1950s and 1960s.

== Death ==
Between 1900 and 1910, a period of great unrest occurred in Montana and the rest of the western United States, as the Land Acts took effect and Reservations were opened up to white settlement. Rocky Boy was instrumental in keeping the peace. That may likely be his main legacy. He died on April 18, 1916, at the age of 64 or 65.
