= Fort Assinniboine =

1879–1911 United States Army fort in Montana

- Hill County, six miles southwest of Havre, Montana
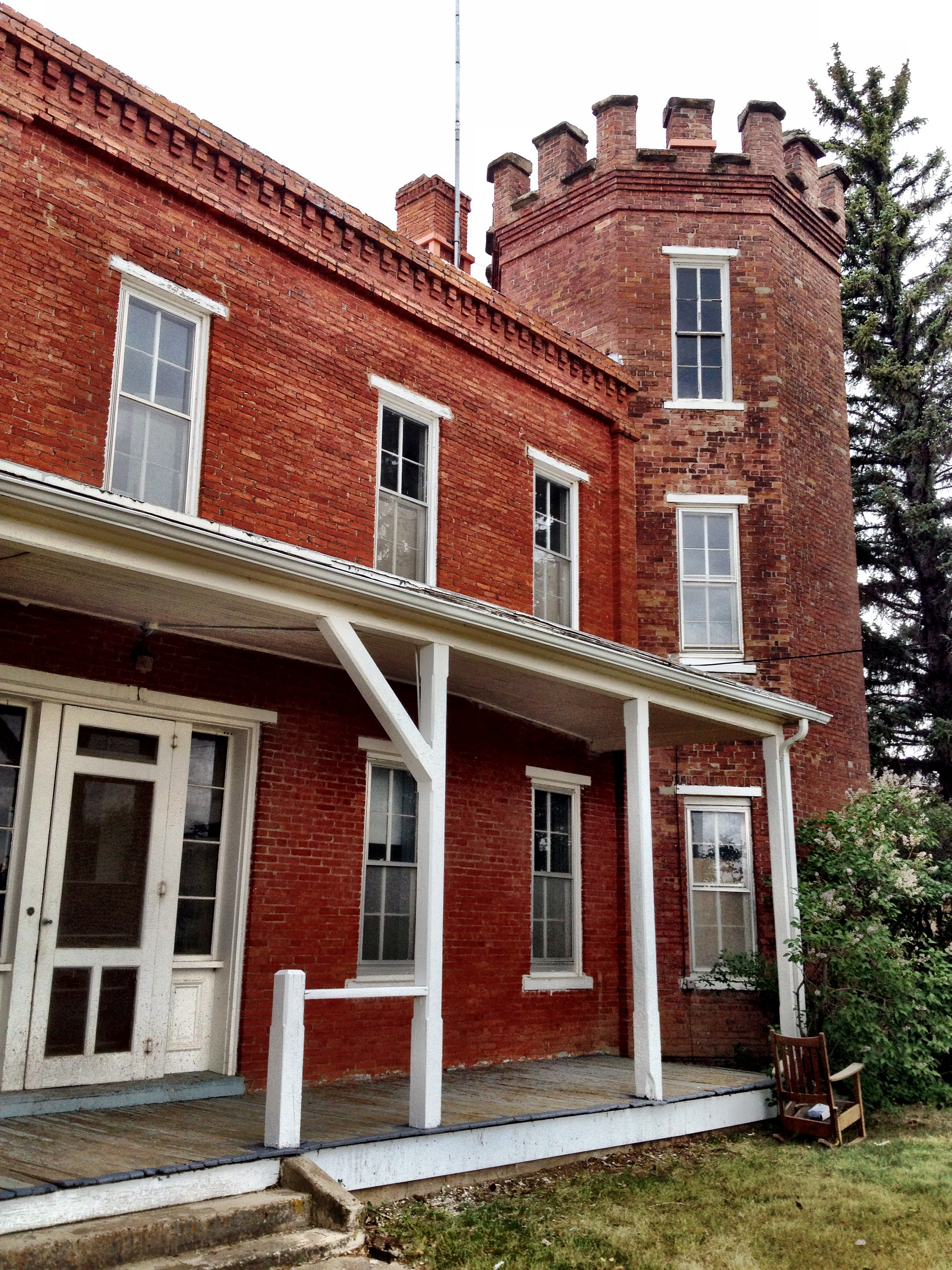
- Company Officers' Quarters at Fort Assinniboine

Site information
- Controlled by: United States

Site history
- Built: 1879
- In use: 1879–1911
- Battles/wars: Cree Campaign
- Fort Assinniboine
- U.S. National Register of Historic Places
- U.S. Historic district
- Location within Montana Location within the United States
- Nearest city: Havre, Montana
- Coordinates: 48°29′59″N 109°47′39″W
- Area: 160 acres (65 ha)
- Built: 1879
- Architect: Lee, Col. J.G.C.; Devlin, L.K.
- NRHP reference No.: 89000040 (original); 100002250 (increase)

Significant dates
- Added to NRHP: May 31, 1989
- Boundary increase: April 2, 2018

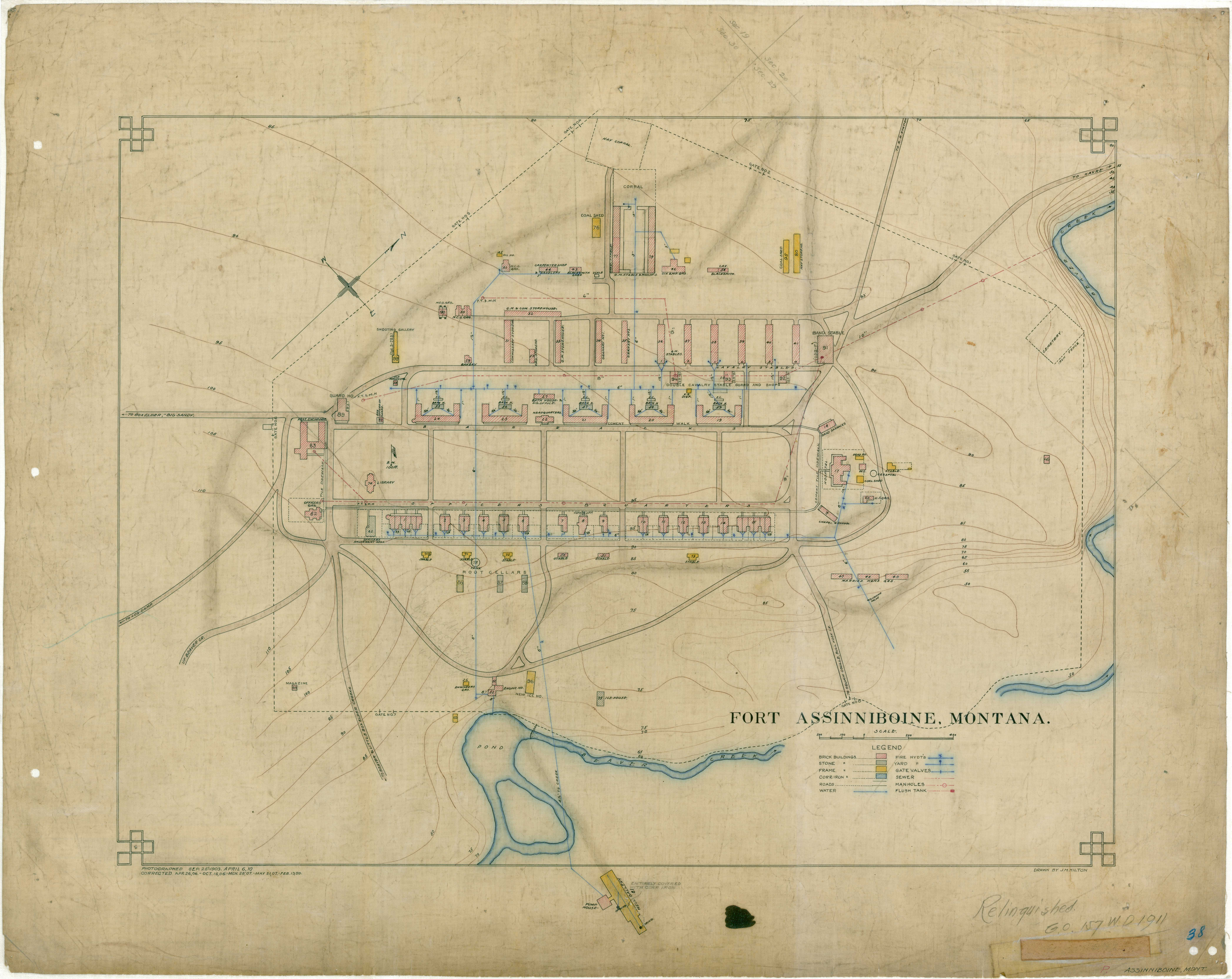
1903 plan of the fort

Fort Assinniboine was a United States Army fort located in present-day north central Montana (historically within the military Department of Dakota). It was built in 1879 and operated by the Army through 1911. The 10th Cavalry Buffalo Soldiers, made up of African-American soldiers, were among the units making up the garrison at the fort. Determining that this fort was no longer needed after the end of the Indian Wars, the US Army closed and abandoned it.

In 1916 Congress authorized a reservation for the Rocky Boy's Band of Chippewa, who were landless. It became known as Rocky Boy's Indian Reservation, named after the chief who had sought the reservation. A portion of the fort was ceded in 1916 for use as a reservation; the land extended in both Hill and Chouteau counties. This was intended for landless Chippewa who had been pushed west out of their traditional territory. In the event, landless Cree and Metis, refugees from Canada, also settled at the reservation.

== Context ==
During the Great Sioux War of 1876, U.S. Army forces led by General Custer suffered a disastrous defeat at the Battle of Little Big Horn (known by the Sioux as the Battle of Greasy Grass) on June 25, 1876. The following year, the US Army defeated and captured the Nez Perce band of Chief Joseph in the Battle of Bear Paw.

At that time, General Phil Sheridan suggested that a fort be built on or near the Milk River to ward off possible attacks from the North by the Sioux led by Chief Sitting Bull, who had migrated to the Cypress Hills in Canada, or by the Nez Perce, some of whom were also in Canada. Lt. Col. J.R. Brooke recommended the site where the post was established. The fort is located in Hill County six miles southwest of Havre (the county seat). Today Highway 87 passes near it. It was named for the Siouan-speaking Assinniboine people. Neither the Sioux nor the Nez Perce in Canada ever attacked across the border.

== Active period ==
The fort was located within a massive military reservation stretching south to the Missouri River, north to the Milk River and containing the Bear's Paw Mountains. It encompassed 704,000 acres (1,100 sq. mi., 2850 km^{2}) at its maximum extent in 1880. It later was reduced to encompass 220,000 acres (344 sq. mi., 890 km^{2}). At its peak, it garrisoned more than 750 officers and enlisted men and their families. With 104 buildings, the fort was one of the largest ever built in the United States.

The 10th Cavalry Buffalo Soldiers, made up of African-American soldiers, were part of the Fort Assiniboine garrison during the Indian Wars. They were called into service on the front during the Spanish–American War. They supported the flank of Roosevelt's "Rough Riders" at the Battle of San Juan Hill in 1898 in Cuba. Eyewitnesses noted that the Rough Riders would not have prevailed without the Buffalo Soldiers.

From the late 19th century, the extensive lands of Fort Assiniboine served as a refuge for bands of landless Chippewa and Cree people, who camped within the military reservation. The fort was operated by the Army until 1911, when it was closed and abandoned, determined to no longer be necessary. The US believed that the Indians were peaceful or under control, mostly contained on reservations in the West, and on the decline. By 1912, a few hundred Native Americans were within the grounds.

== Notable people ==
- John Pershing, career officer assigned for a time to Fort Assinboine. Pershing so impressed General-in-chief of the Army Maj. General Nelson A. Miles, who was on a hunting trip in the area, that Miles transferred the younger man to Washington, D.C. as an aide-de-camp. Pershing later served as a tactical officer at West Point. When the Spanish–American War broke out in 1898, he was reassigned, at his request, to the famed Buffalo Soldiers of Fort Assinniboine from the 10th Cavalry. They fought alongside Roosevelt in Cuba at the Battle of San Juan Hill. Pershing later achieved worldwide fame as the leader of the American Expeditionary Force in World War I, and continued to distinguish himself over the course of his career.
- Sgt. Horace Bivens, member of the 10th Cavalry Regiment and career soldier, he fought in Indian Wars in the Southwest. As part of the 10th, he served under John Pershing in Cuba during the Spanish American War. He was awarded a Silver Star for valor. In the early 20th century, he received the first Army Distinguished Pistol Shot badge because of his scores in marksmanship competitions.

== Closure ==
By the early twentieth century, the Indian Wars were finished and the Army determined it no longer had a need for Fort Assiniboine. At the same time, Chippewa leader Asiniiwin (Rocky Boy) appealed to the Theodore Roosevelt administration for land and education for his band, who had been pushed out of their traditional territory further east.

Gradually numerous Chippewa and Cree people settled on the large military reservation; the Cree had come as refugees from Canada following the North-West Rebellion. The Chippewa had been pushed west from Wisconsin and Minnesota. Both groups traded with the Army and had no land of their own.

In 1916, Congress authorized establishment of a reservation for the Chippewa, who had been supported in their quest by prominent whites in Montana. The government ceded a portion of Fort Assinniboine to the Rocky Boy Indian Reservation, established for the Chippewa band led by Chief Ahsiniwiin (Rocky Boy, or Stone Child.) He had died several months before the reservation was authorized by Congress, and it was eventually named in his honor. It is the smallest reservation in the state in terms of land area, with a total land area of 171.4 square miles (443.9 km^{2}), which includes extensive off-reservation trust lands. (Some lands were added after the initial authorization.)

Most of the abandoned buildings at the fort were soon razed and hauled away by settlers for building materials. A handful of surviving structures have been adapted for use as both an agricultural research station associated with Montana State University - Bozeman, and as a historical preservation site. The site is listed on the National Register of Historic Places.

A portion of the Reservation, where the beaver creek ran through the Bears Paw Mountains, was first designated as a national park. The federal government later ceded it to the city of Havre, Montana for the purpose of a city recreation area. When they failed to use it, the Reservation transferred the land to Hill County, which created Beaver Creek Park. With 10,000 acres, it is the largest county park in the United States.

== Tourism ==
It is possible to visit Fort Assinniboine. The Havre Chamber of Commerce and the Hill County Museum both furnish current visitor information. A tour guide is available during the summer season (June 1 through September 1), Monday through Sunday 9AM to 5PM. Tour guides are on-site. The site is listed on the National Register of Historic Places.

HWY 87 Overview	Local Dirt Roads

== See also ==
- List of military installations in Montana
