= Little Bear (Cree) =

- âyimisîs ᐋᔨᒥᓰᐢ
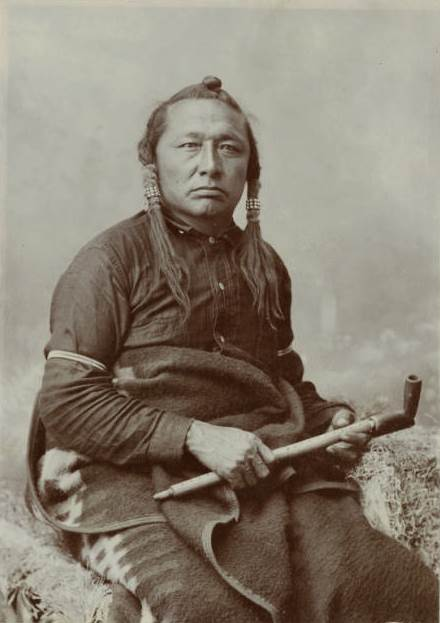
- Little Bear in 1895

Cree leader

Personal details
- Died: 1921
- Children: Four Souls
- Parent: Big Bear
- Nickname: Macquettoquet

Little Bear (born âyimisîs, ᐋᔨᒥᓰᐢ or Macquettoquet - Little Big Bear) was a Cree leader who lived in the District of Alberta, Idaho Territory, Montana Territory, and District of Saskatchewan regions of Canada and the United States, in the 19th and early 20th centuries. He is known for his participation in the 1885 North-West Rebellion, which was fought in Alberta and Saskatchewan.

== Early life ==
Son of tribal leader Big Bear, his exact date of birth is unknown, but some have assumed it to be in the mid-1800s. He is sometimes confused with another Little Bear who was a Chief of the Chippewa tribe in the late 18th century and lived into the first half of the 19th Century, fighting alongside the British in 1813 against the Americans.

One account has him being 43 years old in 1897, while another said Little Bear was already in his 70s in 1915. He may have been born in the early or mid-1840s. He was probably living in the Idaho, Montana, and Wyoming region in the 1850s.

Little Bear said in Butte, Montana, in either 1912 or 1913, that his father lived along the Snake River in Idaho but relocated to the Butte region to hunt for buffalo and other wild game.

=== The Black Hills War ===
Little Bear was said to have participated in the Great Sioux War of 1876 or Black Hills War. However, nearly all the battles of that war were fought in Montana and northeastern Wyoming. After the War, many Cree fled north to Canada and west into British Columbia, Idaho, Oregon, and Washington, but Little Bear and his family continued to live in extreme northern Montana at least for a time before Little Bear moved to Canada.

== North-West Rebellion and aftermath ==
In early 1885, Métis led by Louis Riel, and some Cree living in the District of Saskatchewan fought and lost in the North-West Rebellion against Canada. During the time of the rebellion, Wandering Spirit and some other members of Big Bear's band — reportedly including Big Bear's son Little Bear — killed nine unarmed white civilians that were living at Frog Lake. This became known as the Frog Lake Massacre.

=== Return to the United States ===
After the rebellion ended, Little Bear and Lucky Man fled the Canadian authorities. The two gathered many of their people and journeyed back to Montana. They slipped through the Babb, Montana region in 1885 and hid out on the Blackfeet reservation on the U.S. side of the line. At the time, the reservation stretched from the Continental Divide to the Dakota Territory border. Little Bear and his band were arrested at Fort Assinniboine in December 1885, but they were released upon orders from Washington, D.C. Little Bear's band spent most of the next two years near Fort Assinniboine, and the officers sometimes hired band members to cut wood for the fort.

Little Bear was considered the leader of the Ojibwas of the Basin, Montana region (southwest Montana). Little Bear's people visited the Flathead Reservation, which frustrated the Flathead Indians' agent Peter Ronan. The Crees' requests for a permanent home on either the Blackfeet or the Flathead reservation were rebuffed. Montana Native and non-Native peoples did not welcome Little Bear and his group, saying he had not been born in the United States. They called for Little Bear and his band (many of them Ojibwas) to be deported to Canada. In 1888, the United States reduced the size of the Blackfeet reservation and divided it into three smaller reservations – the Blackfeet reservation, Fort Belknap reservation, and the Fort Peck reservation. Life got harder for Little Bear and his people, and they often went hungry.

In 1895, Little Bear and his band joined the Montana Wildest West Show as performers. It was a calculated gamble. Little Bear sought assurances that the show would travel to Washington, D.C., where he hoped to gain an audience with President Grover Cleveland and plead his people's case for a reservation. He feared that he and his people might end up stranded far from home. After much deliberation, Little Bear signed a six-month contract, and the Crees went on a six-week tour with the show through twenty-three cities, ending in Bellevue, Kentucky. As Little Bear feared, the show went bankrupt, and Little Bear's people were stranded. Unable to travel to Washington D.C., Little Bear settled for an audience with Secretary of War Daniel S. Lamont at Fort Thomas, Kentucky. En route to the fort, Little Bear's people camped along the Ohio River at Taylor's Bottom, where a crowd of local citizens led by the mayor threatened them with jail if they did not leave the state. The sheriff escorted them to the fort, where the commanding officer at first refused to let them camp. Finally, Little Bear received permission to camp for one night, and the next morning, he spoke to Secretary of War Lamont through an interpreter. Lamont refused to take any action, either to help or to detain the Crees, claiming that the war department had nothing to do with their predicament.

Little Bear and his people retraced their steps to Cincinnati, where they signed a contract with the Cincinnati Zoological Gardens. The zoo paid them to camp on its grounds as an exhibit. Little Bear declined an offer for his people to stay at the zoo permanently. By mid-July, they had earned enough money to travel by train back to Montana.

=== Deportation ===
In 1896, the United States deported Little Bear, Lucky Man and hundreds of other landless Cree and Ojibwas of Montana back to Canada. Little Bear and Lucky Man feared the death penalty for their participation in the attacks at Frog Lake. When they arrived in Canada, they were apprehended. One account has it they stood trial for their part in the massacre and were acquitted of the charges, while another says no charges were laid against Little Bear as the magistrate said the evidence did not deem charges. (A Native by the name of Little Bear (Apaschiskoos) is listed among the eight Natives hanged on November 27, 1885, at Battleford. This may indicate that the government in fact hanged the wrong man for Little Bear's actions that day.)

Little Bear settled in Canada perhaps at Onion Lake and in 1898 travelled, with John McDougall, to Ottawa to complain of the treatment of his people by the government.

He soon returned to Montana.

== Efforts to gain a reservation ==
Little Bear followed the Chippewa leader Rocky Boy, hoping that the landless nations of Montana could gain reservations. In 1902, Rocky Boy and Little Bear attempted to gain either a reservation or tribal recognition on the Flathead reservation. The bill to make the Flathead reservation for other landless tribes failed to pass in 1904.

In 1905, 1906, 1908, and around 1911 Little Bear, accompanied by missonary John Chantler McDougall, contacted Canadian government officials to request land for homes for the band formerly living in Montana. The government legitimized the Montana First Nation, and established the Montana reserve at Maskiwacis.

In 1910 Little Bear and some of his band returned to the States and joined the Rocky Boy Reservation.

=== Babb Chippewa reservation ===
In 1909, the United States set aside a new Chippewa reservation within the Blackfeet reservation, in Montana, between Saint Mary Lake, Babb, and the Canada–US border. Chief Rocky Boy was the first to settle there, followed by Little Bear and the people he led. In all, around 200 Chippewa and Cree people settled there.

=== Rocky Boy reservation ===
Since hundreds of Chippewas and Cree continued to remain landless, Rocky Boy and Little Bear stepped up their efforts to get another reservation set aside in Montana. Rocky Boy's brother, Pennahto, told Little Bear to request the old Fort Assinniboine Military Reservation be set aside as a new reservation. Neither Pennahto nor Rocky Boy lived to see the establishment of Rocky Boy Reservation. After Rocky Boy Reservation was officially established in 1916, Little Bear became its first chairman.

Little Bear was already an old man in 1916. He died in 1921, at or nearly eighty years of age.
