= Installment loan =

Loan that is repaid over time with a set number of scheduled payments

An installment loan is a type of agreement or contract involving a loan that is repaid over time with a set number of scheduled payments; normally at least two payments are made towards the loan. The term of loan may be as little as a few months and as long as 30 years. A mortgage loan, for example, is a type of installment loan.

The term is most strongly associated with traditional consumer loans, originated and serviced locally, and repaid over time by regular payments of principal and interest. These “installment loans” are generally considered to be safe and affordable alternatives to payday and title loans, and to open ended credit such as credit cards.

In 2007 the US Department of Defense exempted installment loans from legislation designed to prohibit predatory lending to service personnel and their families, acknowledging in its report the need to protect access to beneficial installment credit while closing down less safe forms of credit.

== History ==
Lending has been practiced for many thousands of years and has manifested a variety of forms throughout that time. Primitive loan contracts from Mesopotamia as early as the 10th century B.C. evidence the development of a rudimentary system of credit which included the concept of interest, and the concept of paying the interest in installments at regular intervals. The payment of the interest on loans in installments can be discerned as early as the 6th century B.C. within such ancient contracts as the following contract for a loan of money, which is from ~ 550 B.C., wherein no security was given the creditor, but he received an interest of 20% and that interest was made payable in installments at intervals of one (assumedly lunar) month: "One and a half manas of money belonging to Iddin-Marduk, son of Iqisha-apla, son of Nur-Sin, (is loaned) unto Ben-Hadad-natan, son of Addiya and Bunanit, his wife. Monthly the amount of a mana shall increase its sum by a shekel of money. From the first of the month Siman, of the fifth year of Nabonidus, King of Babylon, they shall pay the sum on the money. The call shall be made for the interest money at the house which belongs to Iba. Monthly shall the sum be paid." (From the Fordham University Internet Ancient History Sourcebook, Editor: Paul Halsall, "A Collection of Contracts from Mesopotamia, c. 2300 - 428 BCE").

A type of installment contract other than a loan involves the purchase of durable goods on credit. Such arrangements are usually referred to as "installment plans" rather than "installment loans". In 1807, the installment selling of durable goods was introduced in the US by the furniture store Cowperthwaite & Sons. It opened in New York City and soon began extending credit for purchases of furniture items with payment by installments. Within a few years, such installment plans were being used by merchants engaged in selling furniture in other cities. Well known installment plans used by Singer company for financing the purchase of their sewing machines began in 1850. After Singer, other companies started using installment loans. In 1899 in Boston, more than a half of furniture dealers used such loans. Around 1890, installment loans were used to finance sewing machines, radios, refrigerators, phonographs, washing machines, vacuum cleaners, jewelry and clothing. By 1924, 75% of automobiles were purchased with installment loans.

== Tribal installment loans ==
Tribal installment loans are another version of installment loans. Unlike other forms of installment loans, which are offered by non bank lenders and overseen by state and federal regulators, tribal installment loans are offered by tribal lending entities and regulated by independent tribal regulatory authorities.

== See also ==
- Hire purchase
