= Stone Child College =

Tribal land-grant community college in Box Elder, Montana, U.S.

- Motto: Making our dreams happen with academics, culture, and commitment
- Type: Public tribal land-grant community college
- Established: 1984
- Affiliations: Chippewa Cree Tribe
- Academic affiliations: American Indian Higher Education Consortium; American Association of Community Colleges; Space-grant
- President: Cory Sangrey-Billy
- Dean: Wilma Tyner
- Location: Box Elder, Montana, U.S. 48°17′24″N 109°52′11″W
- Campus: Rural
- Colors: Blue and gray
- Website: www.stonechild.edu

Stone Child College (SCC) is a public tribal land-grant community college in Box Elder, Montana. SCC is affiliated with the Chippewa Cree Tribe and located on the Rocky Boy's Indian Reservation in north central Montana; it is one of seven Tribal Colleges in Montana. In 2008–2009, SCC had an enrollment of 511, of whom 98 percent were American Indian descent; 20 percent were bilingual or of limited English proficiency. SCC students range in age from 17 to 72, with the average age at 30. The college retention rate is 47 percent and the graduation rate is 20 percent.

== History ==
SCC was chartered by the Chippewa-Cree Business Committee on May 17, 1984. In 1994, the college was designated a land-grant college alongside 31 other tribal colleges.

== Academics ==
Stone Child offers a Bachelor degree along with Associate degrees in seventeen disciplines and six certificates.

== Athletics ==
- Basketball: In August 2010 Stone Child College, along with the other tribal colleges around Montana, formed the Montana Tribal Colleges Basketball League. Presently, the college has both a men's and women's team.

== Partnerships ==
SCC is a member of the American Indian Higher Education Consortium (AIHEC), which is a community of tribally and federally chartered institutions working to strengthen tribal nations and make a lasting difference in the lives of American Indians and Alaska Natives. SCC was created in response to the higher education needs of American Indians. SCC generally serves geographically isolated populations that have no other means accessing education beyond the high school level.

== See also ==
- American Indian College Fund (AICF)
