= Rocky Boy's Indian Reservation =

Indian reservation in Montana, U.S.

Coordinates: 48°17′N 109°54′W

- Indian reservation
- Seal

- Location in Montana
- Tribe: Chippewa Cree
- Country: United States
- State: Montana
- Counties: Chouteau; Hill
- Established: September 7, 1916
- Headquarters: Rocky Boy's Agency

Government
  - Body: Business Committee
  - Chairman: Harlan Gopher Baker
  - Vice-Chairman: Ted E. Whitford Sr.

Area
  - Total: 171.4 sq mi (444 km^{2})

Population (2017)
  - Total: 3,794
  - Density: 22.14/sq mi (8.547/km^{2})
- Website: chippewacree-nsn.gov

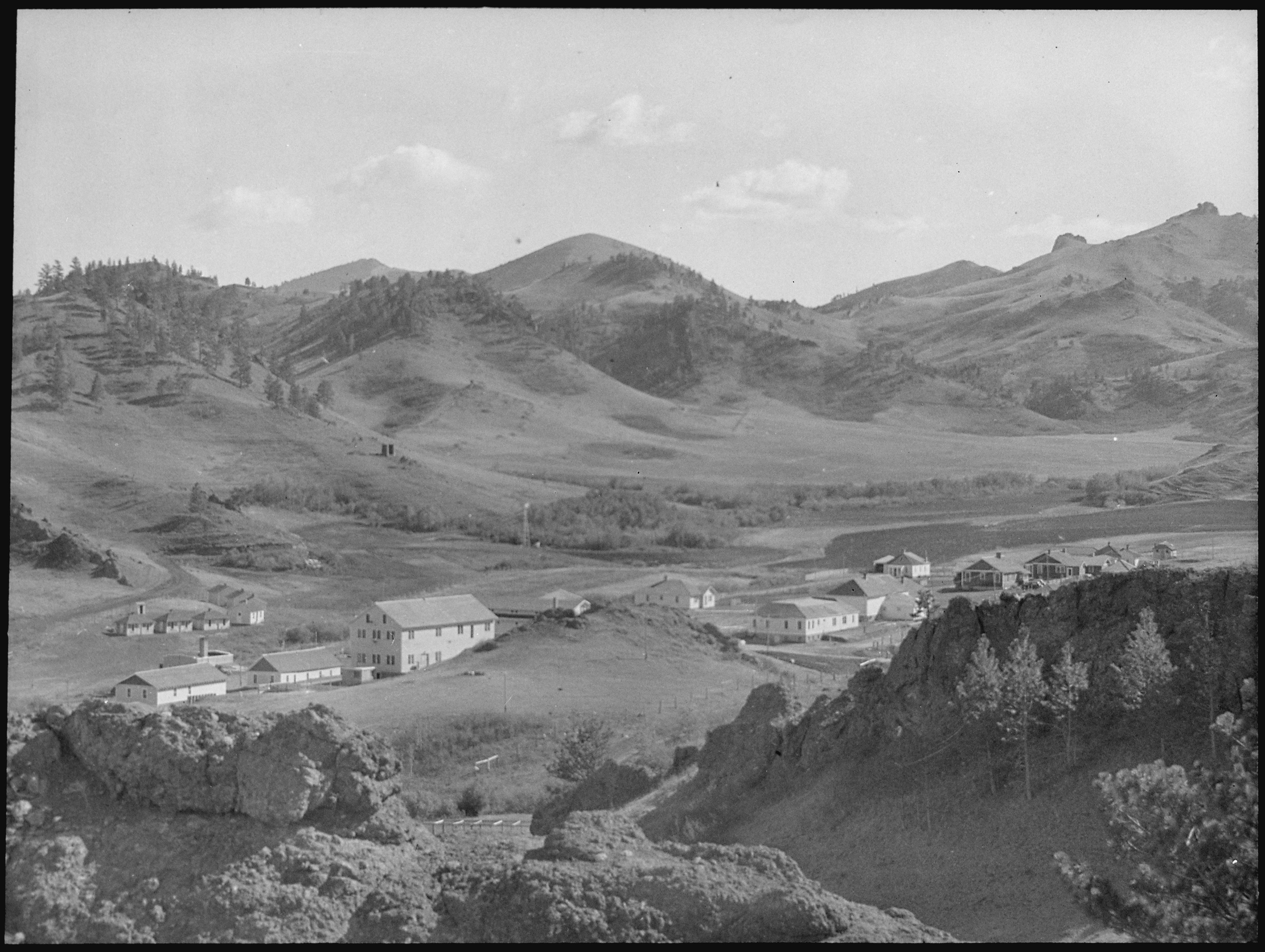
General view of buildings at Rocky Boy Indian Reservation, 1936

Rocky Boy's Indian Reservation (also known as Rocky Boy Reservation) is one of seven Native American reservations in the U.S. state of Montana. It is the land base of the Chippewa Cree Indians of the Rocky Boy's Reservation, a federally recognized tribe. The tribe call themselves "Ne Hiyawak" which means "those who speak the same language".

Established by an act of Congress on September 7, 1916, the reservation was named after Asiniiwin, (Stone Child, incorrectly translated as Rocky Boy), the chief of the Chippewa band, who had died a few months earlier. The reservation was established for landless Chippewa (Ojibwe) Indians in the American West, but within a short period of time many Cree (nēhiyaw) and Métis also settled there. Today, the Cree outnumber the Chippewa on the reservation. The Bureau of Indian Affairs (BIA) recognizes it as the Chippewa Cree Reservation. The headquarters is at Rocky Boy's Agency, Montana.

The reservation is located in Hill and Chouteau counties in north central Montana, about 40 miles (64 km) from the Canada–U.S. border. It has a total land area of 171.4 square miles (444 km^{2}), which includes extensive off-reservation trust lands. The reservation reportedly has 3,323 enrolled members, 55% of the total 6,177 enrolled members in the tribe.

== Description ==
The reservation was established by congressional statute on September 7, 1916 (39 Stat. 739, Sec. 10), to provide land for the Rocky Boy's Band of Chippewa Indians, who had been forced out of territory in Minnesota and were landless. The Rocky Boy's Indian Reservation is in the Bears Paw Mountains in north-central Montana. According to the map of Montana, the reservation takes in land within the boundaries of Hill and Chouteau counties, about 40 miles (64 km) south of the Canada–United States border. It is the smallest reservation in the state in terms of land area, with a total land area of 171.4 square miles (443.9 km^{2}), which includes extensive off-reservation trust lands. The population was 3,323 at the 2010 census, an increase of 24 percent compared to 2000. Three other reservations of the seven in the state also had population growth during this period.

The Bureau of Indian Affairs' Labor Force Report of 2005 reported 5,656 enrolled members in the tribe. The largest community of the reservation is Box Elder, although a small part of Box Elder extends off reservation lands. More than 80% of the tribal enrolled members are classifiable as "adoptees" under the tribal constitution, as they have non-Chippewa tribal origin.

The Department of Interior refers to the Chippewa-Cree Tribe as being the recognized tribe on the reservation, but this is a term of convenience. The Chippewa and Cree peoples are distinct tribes among the several that are part of the larger Anishinaabe family.

== History ==
Chief Rocky Boy wrote to the Bureau of Indian Affairs and later to President Theodore Roosevelt on January 14, 1902, asking the U.S. government for land, housing, and education for his band of Chippewa Indians, composed of 130 men, women and children. They had been forced out of areas to the east and were landless. Also among landless Indians in Montana were a band of Cree.

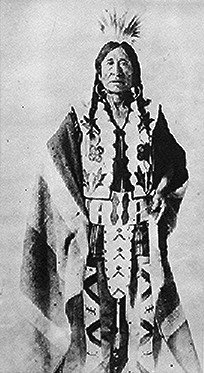
Chief Ahsiniiwin (Rocky Boy)

Chief Rocky Boy (Ahsiniiwin) worked with Republican Senator Joseph M. Dixon, writer Frank Bird Linderman, and other influential individuals in Montana, including painter Charles Russell, to achieve his goal. He lived mainly in north central Montana, although he also traveled to southwestern and western areas of the state. The Rocky Boy Band was listed at 75 in a 1908 census that was certified by the Department of the Interior. Another 39 were listed separately as affiliated persons but not Chippewa, by agent Thralls B. Wheat, who was responsible for land allotments.

In 1908, Montana passed the Land Acts, regulating Native American lands. The Swan Valley Massacre of 1908 in the northwest part of the state aroused outrage among Native Americans. A small Pend d'Oreilles hunting party, which included women and elders, was attacked by state officials while they were hunting off-reservation in their traditional territory. This right was protected by treaties with the US government, but the state thought they had the power to regulate it. An armed game warden confronted the party when he thought they had not moved out of their camp quickly enough and shot at members. Gunfire was exchanged, and a total of four Pend d'Oreille were killed in the incident, as was the game warden.

In November 1909, over 100 landless Chippewa-Cree from southwestern and western Montana and northern Idaho (including the Coeur d'Alene Indian Reservation) gathered near Helena to be relocated to a new homeland on the Blackfeet Reservation, which was closer to their traditional home. With the new Chippewa-Cree Reservation approved and set aside, the government redirected the Chippewa-Cree to the Chippewa band's new home. The new reservation was located between St. Mary, Babb (which is on the Blackfeet Reservation), and the Canada–US border. It was first called the Babb Reservation.

Chief Little Bear soon followed Rocky Boy with his own band, arriving with about 200 Cree from Canada after the North-West Rebellion. According to knowledgeable Blackfeet, the name plates are still discernible, showing the effort to relocate the Chippewa there.

Anishinaabe leaders feared they would lose the land and forced the Chippewa away, as they were not Blackfeet people and were not entitled to allotments. The US Army had allowed the Chippewa and other landless Indians, including Cree refugees, to settle at Fort Assinniboine in Hill County. By 1912–1913 nearly 600 Chippewa and Cree were living on the large Fort Assinniboine Military Reservation. The Rocky Boy Reservation, which was formed in part by land ceded by the Army from Fort Assinniboine. Most of those settled in the area were Cree refugees from Canada in the U.S. under terms of asylum.

Rocky Boy had already supervised his Chippewa band census in 1908 and had it certified by the Interior Department. Chief Rocky Boy was living on the new Chippewa Reservation near Babb, Montana with 50 to 60 people. He negotiated with the US Indian agent for additional lands, which were approved in 1916. Soon after the reservation was officially established, Chippewa and other landless Indians, to include the Cree from north central Montana, western Montana, and northern Idaho, settled alongside those already living on the new Rocky Boy Reservation.

With Frank Linderman leading many of the European-American supporters, the US Congress passed legislation in 1916 to establish what was first called Rocky Boy's Reservation. The Indian Inspector Frank Churchill was sent to Montana to negotiate with the chief. Ahsiniiwin educated Churchill about the Chippewa, saying that they lived all around Montana, including at the Blackfeet and Flathead reservations, as well as near many cities dominated by European Americans, including Anaconda, Billings, Butte, Deer Lodge, Great Falls, Havre, Helena, Missoula, Wolf Point and others. Ahsiniiwin asserted that he was peaceful at all times, and he spoke only for the Chippewa people. He had worked to establish Turtle Mountain Indian Reservation and signed the 1889 Red Lake Agreement in Minnesota.

Churchill asked the Department of Interior to withdraw all of Valley County from white settlement in order to establish a new closed Chippewa reservation there. Both requests were granted by the Department of Interior. In the end, many of the Chippewa-Cree who lived in western Montana were not willing to relocate to far northeastern Montana. Chippewa notation: The Sharrock report/addendum to the official Ewers Report notes the 1908 land was proposed for "Rocky Boy's Band of Chippewa Indians".

Chippewa notation: According to the papers of Indian agent Frank Bird Linderman (1869-1938), Chief Rocky Boy died at Ft. Assiniboine on April 18, 1916. Contemporary newspapers also reported that Rocky Boy died in Fort Assiniboine.

But Robert Gopher (Blackfeet), an oral historian of the Chippewa, says that Rocky Boy was assassinated by rival Cree who used poison roots. They were anxious to settle at the reservation. According to the oral traditions of the Saskatchewan Cree, Little Bear was known to use a specific poisonous root to kill political rivals. If the assassination account is true, it threatened the Cree settlement at Rocky Boy Reservation. Linderman supposedly said that rocky Boy in his last words said he did not want to accept the Cree on the newly established reservation. But they had already been occupying land in the area and at Fort Assiniboine.

In 1917 a census was conducted at Rocky Boy Reservation in order to establish a tribal roll for what became known as the Chippewa Cree Tribe. Chippewa notation: James McLaughlin, the Interior Agent who entered errors on the 1917 tribal roll, is the same agent who sold Rocky Boy's land in Thief River, Minnesota. The proceeds of that sale were distributed to the Chippewa people of Red Lake, who were established on a reservation of that name.

Modern map of Rocky Boy's Indian Reservation and nearby reservations (In orange).

== Chippewa Cree Tribal Buffalo Pasture ==
For cultural and food sovereignty purposes, a buffalo herd was established in 2021 on 1,200 acres (490 ha). Bison is the correct taxonomic term for American bison, but buffalo is the common vernacular term. Surrounded by 7.1 miles (11.4 km) of fencing, the Pasture is about a mile from Box Elder, Montana. The Confederated Salish and Kootenai Tribes donated five bison and American Prairie donated six. In 2022, they received ten bison from American Prairie to strengthen the herd.

== Economy ==
Rocky Boy's residents who work on the reservation are employed by the schools, Bureau of Indian Affairs, Indian Health Service, and tribal government. There is also some wheat farming and post and pole production.

According to the Tribal Chairman's address to the Havre Area Chamber of Commerce in January 2007, the annual tribal revenue of $52 million is infused into the local economy as a result of federal programs, private business, and tribal businesses on the Rocky Boy's Reservation. The majority of reservation residents work for the self-governing Chippewa Cree Tribe. Compacts are maintained with the Bureau of Indian Affairs (BIA) and Indian Health Service. Funds originating within the BIA [note: there is only one BIA employee at Rocky Boy due to the self-governance compact], together with tribal government, provide work for 231 full- and part-time employees.

The tribe has set up the Chippewa Cree Community Development Corporation, which employs 25 people. Other enterprises include Chippewa Cree Construction Company (20), Chippewa Cree Construction Corporation (14), National Tribal Development Association (9), Northern Winz Casino (70), and RJS & Associates (4).

It also has services for enrolled members, and operates the Chippewa Cree Housing Authority (25 employees). By the Tribe's compact with the Indian Health Service, it employs 135 staff within the Rocky Boy Health Board.

In 2011, the tribe began a new business with Plain Green Loans, an online lending company. It had a staff of 25 as of December 2011. Plain Green and similar companies owned by other tribes have been criticized for profiting from high-interest online loans (called predatory lending). The Chippewa Cree are part of the Native American Lending Alliance, an organization of tribes that are in the business of online lending.

=== Northern Winz Casino ===
The Chippewa Cree tribe operates the Northern Winz Casino. Construction began in May 2006, with the tribal grand opening occurring in February 2007, and a public grand opening March 30, 2007. The casino is located on U.S. Highway 87, 6 miles (10 km) east of Box Elder, Montana.

=== Chippewa Cree Business Committee ===
The Business Committee is effectively the Tribal Council and the governing body of the Tribe; it is dominated by Chippewa Cree adoptees. The eight council members and chairman are elected at large; they serve four-year terms on staggered schedules of elections. This type of election means that each candidate must gain a majority of votes on the reservation, leaving the minority Chippewa without representation.

The Tribe elected to "compact" the Bureau of Indian Affairs (FY 93) and Indian Health Service (FY 94) programs under Title IV of the P.l. 93-638 Act. This act gave more power to the tribes to determine their priorities and exercise governance.

== Education ==
The tribe operates and administers its own educational system: the Rocky Boy public schools with 184 teachers and staff.

Stone Child College in Box Elder offers a Bachelor's degree and variety of Associate degrees.

== Religious institutions ==
The Chippewa follow the peace pipe religion, rooted in the Grand Lodge or Mediwiwin society. They do not accept the use of peyote in their rites. The grand lodge tradition is tightly held; it takes a lifetime for qualified members to learn all four levels of the society.

While most of the Chippewa Cree are Christian, some members of the tribe have maintained traditional spiritual beliefs and cultural ceremonies/activities. The traditional Thirst Dance, more commonly known as the Sun Dance, is held the first week of July. The annual powwow is held the first week of August. Other cultural events are held throughout the year, including an annual Christmas Dance, round dances, ceremonial feasts, revived cultural ceremonies, and cultural camps.

Feeling displaced in Rocky Boy, the Chippewa have continued to practice their traditions on Hill 57, outside Great Falls, Montana. The practices had centered around Mary Chippewa Gopher, whose spiritual name was "Iron Claw Bear Woman". She was the niece of Chief Rocky Boy. Her father, Charles Chippewa or Walking Stone, was the brother to the chief. Mary Chippewa married Jim Gopher, or Loud Thunder.

(notation: In the BIA technical report on the Little Shell: "the Chippewa included a small and distinct group, centered around the Gopher family, some of whom are still resident of "hill 57" today. This group claimed descent from a Chippewa chief from the Great Lakes area. They were identified in the studies of the "Hill 57" as descendants of a Chippewa band from the Great Lakes, unrelated to the Little Shell families, Turtle Mountain, or the bands on the Rocky Boy's reservation). This is accurate in the sense that the Chippewa were not related to the Little Bear Cree who also occupied the reservation since it was established.

Currently the four levels of teachings of the sweat lodge are held by descendants of Robert Gopher, who was the youngest son of Jim and Mary Chippewa Gopher. The family are not the only ones to carry the teachings and knowledge of their predecessors.

Various Christian churches have become established at the reservation. The Evangelical Lutheran Church in America has a mission, Our Saviour's Lutheran Church. Toward the end of 1999, Rev. Joseph W. Bailey Sr. was joined by Christian youth groups from around the country; together they built a new sanctuary and outdoor chapel, and started work on a retreat center.

In December 2019 the original St. Mary's Catholic Church burnt down. In June 2021 the community held a groundbreaking ceremony to start the rebuild of the new church.

The Baptist mission church was established in late 1999. The church building was erected in June 2002. The Rocky Boy Assembly of God Church is self-governing and self-supporting. Eric and Amanda Reed have shared the senior pastor in Rocky Boy in the Spring of 2006.

== Communities ==
Rocky Boy Reservation has nine settlements, eight of which are classified by the US Census Bureau as census-designated places (CDP). Most of the CDPs are located in the Bear Paw Mountains.

- Agency (official CDP name is "Rocky Boy's Agency") - population 355 at the 2010 census
- Azure - located in the Bear Paw Mountains
- Boneau - located 7 miles east of Box Elder, near the Bear Paw Mountains
- Box Elder - population 87 at the 2010 census; located on the plains
- Parker School
- Rocky Boy West, or New Box Elder - population 890 at the 2010 census; located on the southeast side of Box Elder, on the plains
- Saint Pierre - population 350 at the 2010 census
- Sangrey - situated at the edge and just within the Bear Paw Mountains

In addition, a new settlement is sited about 3 miles west of Boneau, with around 23 housing units.

Hill 57 was a settlement where members of the Rocky Boy band moved after they had lost several dozen family members from starvation on Chief Mountain. Opponents of tribal termination noted the problems of the settlement, which occurred after allotment of communal lands had left members disadvantaged. A land plot inherited by Robert Gopher was obtained by George Black Tongue. He had been barred from the 1908 roll and should not have been eligible to acquire that land.

The settlement at Hill 57 followed the dark period when some members of the Rocky Boy Band were assassinated; tribal members left the reservation to preserve themselves. The Chippewa Cree Tribal Constitution was passed that adopted a ten-year absentee policy, wherein members away from the reservation for longer than 10 years lost their tribal citizenship. In the early 21st century, the Chippewa are studying suing the Chippewa Cree Tribal Council. They contend that the Chippewa Cree are not a lawful recognized tribe. They believe that the tribal immunity from civil suits does not apply to individuals who do not have blood descent in a historic tribe, but claim adoptee status on a reservation.

== Climate ==
Rocky Boy Reservation has a wide variation of climate conditions. Near Box Elder, the climate is warmer during the summer months, as a result of the lower elevation, and windier during the cold winter months. During the cold winter months, the Chinook winds can cause damage around the Box Elder region. High wind storms often occur during the winter months. With the warmer temperatures, the Chinook Winds result in melting snow. The Chinook Winds also occur in the Bear Paw Mountains, but their strength there is not as great as on the open plains. The winds may warm the communities located in the Bear Paw Mountains during the winter months. Precipitation, especially in the form of snow, is somewhat higher in the mountains than on the plains.

Average low temperatures during the winter months of December, January, and February at Box Elder are 9, 5, and 9. Average high temperatures for the same winter months at Box Elder are 30, 26, and 31. Average high temperatures for the summer months of June, July, and August are 76, 85, and 84. Average low temperatures for the same summer months at Box Elder are 49, 54, and 51.

== Notable Chippewa, Anishinaabe ==
- Chief Rocky Boy, or Asiniweyin (as his name appears on the 1908 Chippewa Census, <United States Department of Interior>), member of the Red Robe Band noted in the 1864 Pembina Chippewa Treaty, signor of the 1889 Red Lake Agreement #6, assisted in the creation of the Turtle Mountain Chippewa Reservation. With Frank B. Linderman, Charles M. Russell, Paris Gibson, and William Boles (according to the Great Falls Tribune), he established the Rocky Boy Indian Reservation.
- Charles Chippewa, brother to Chief Rocky Boy, was at one time the keeper of the Chief Rocky Boy bundle. This bundle is now kept by a descendant of the Rocky Boy family.
- John Goodrunner (Chippewa), coordinated the annual Rain Dance, sometimes referred to as the Sun Dance, at the Rocky Boy reservation until his death.
- Mary Chippewa Gopher, "Iron Claw Bear Woman", niece of Chief Rocky Boy, she led Chippewa resistance against policies of the U.S. government that interfered with tribal sovereignty. Also known as Iron Claws, she raised a family at Hill 57 after her people were dispossessed from their new reservation. She rejected inclusion of Cree on the reservation. She led her people from 1946 until her death on November 23, 1965.
- Mary Bearwalker McGillis, daughter of Chief Big Rock's son Bearwalker, was a contemporary of Iron Claws. She is also credited with holding the Chippewa people together through a difficult period.
- Duncan Standing Rock Sr., elder and possessor of ceremonial knowledge of the Chippewa people. He held the sacred bundle of Chief Rocky Boy until his death, February 28, 2021.

Robert Gopher, Listening Thunder, grand-nephew to Chief Rocky Boy, led the Chippewa resistance after the death of his parents, and fostered the Chippewa people's efforts to restore their sovereignty.

== Notable Chippewa-Cree ==
- Black Powder (c.1800 - d. 1865) was an Ojibwa ogima (leader). His date of birth is not known but may have occurred between 1800 and 1805. Ogima Black Powder was native to the Montana, Alberta, and Saskatchewan regions. Little has been recorded about his life. He died in 1865. Chippewa notation: Black Powder is not on the 1908 Census of the Rocky Boy Band of Chippewa Indians.
- Big Bear (1825-c. 1888). According to historians, Big Bear was Saulteaux but raised as a Plains Cree. He was born in 1825 as the son of Black Powder, an Ojibwa chief, and an Ojibwa mother in the Jackfish Lake region of Saskatchewan, a few miles north of present-day North Battleford, Saskatchewan, and not far from Alberta. He settled primarily in the region where the present-day Saulteaux First Nation of Saskatchewan is located, near the Onion Lake First Nation. He was a leader in the North-West Rebellion of 1885. The whites arrested him as the principal leader of the short rebellion and sentenced him to prison. In early 1888, Big Bear was released. He settled on the Poundmaker First Nation, where he died soon after. Chippewa notation: Big Bear was not a predecessor to Chief Rocky Boy, for whom the Rocky Boy Reservation is named.
- Little Bear (c.1850-1921). The son of Big Bear, considered Cree. Some said his mother was a Chippewa whose people had relocated from Wisconsin to Montana. Little Bear was born around 1850. After his father relocated to Montana from Idaho, the family settled in southwestern and north central Montana, depending on the season. The latter had vast herds of buffalo and was extremely important to native people. The Lewis and Clark Expedition (1804-1806) had reported seeing the largest buffalo herds in the region from present-day Great Falls to north of the area where the Rocky Boy Reservation is located. Little Bear was one of the principal Cree leaders who fought in the 1885 North-West Rebellion in Canada. He was accused of taking part in the Frog Lake Massacre, along with ogima Lucky Man. After the short conflict ended, Little Bear fled as a refugee from Canada back to Montana. Little Bear was said to be the instigator of the Frog Lake massacre in Frog Lake, Saskatchewan in 1885.

Little Bear's involvement in the Frog Lake Massacre is the subject of the book, Blood Red The Sun, by William B. Cameron, among a handful of captives taken by the Cree band, which continued to elude Canadian law authorities. Cameron was a clerk for the Hudson Bay Company. He later testified on behalf of Little Bear's father, Big Bear, who attempted to stop his son and supporters from instigating the massacre. Cameron identified Little Bear as the leader of the massacre, in which a total of nine were killed, including clergy. Some contemporary writings blamed Wandering Spirit. Cameron was held hostage by the Little Bear Band for two months. Little Bear's band fled to Montana, but they were subject to deportation to Canada in 1896 by the U.S. Congress. The newspapers reported that the Little Bear Cree forced the U.S. Cavalry back to Havre, Montana and had returned to their homeland when the troops returned from Canada.

There were two distinct rolls, the 1908 census of the Rocky Boy Band of Chippewa, was conducted near Helena, MT by Thralls B. Wheat, an allotting agent of the Department of the Interior. This was the only legal census of the Rocky Boy Band; it was supervised by Chief Rocky Boy. Neither Little Bear, nor members of his band appear on this roll.

In 1914, Chief Rocky Boy was corresponding with Interior Secretary Franklin Lane, and expressed the Chippewa band's neutrality in the World War I conflict. He also wrote to President Woodrow Wilson, dated September 25, 1914, expressing the band's position. No Chippewa Cree tribe existed at the time; official correspondence refers only to Rocky Boy's Band of Chippewa Indians. Chief Big Rock enacted his own Chippewa council following Rocky Boy's death, consisting of Pat Raspberry, Standing Rock, Charles Mosney, and Crazy Boy. This council held a formal council and pipe ceremony in Great Falls with white supporters: writer Frank B. Linderman, Theodore Gibson, William Boles, and painter Charles M. Russell.

By the start of the 20th century, Little Bear returned to Montana, his native country, and began to follow Rocky Boy. In 1905, Little Bear contacted Canadian leaders to request allowing the Cree from Montana to relocate to Canada. Officials agreed and the Cree settled primarily with the Onion Lake First Nation and the Samson First Nation (this reserve includes the Ermineskin, Louis Bull, and Montana First Nations). In 1908, Little Bear again contacted Canadian leaders requesting permission for more landless Chippewa and Cree to relocate from Montana to Canada.

After the Rocky Boy Reservation was officially established in 1916, Little Bear followed Rocky Boy and his band there, bringing about 200 of his own people. He took over as leader of the new Reservation after Rocky Boy's death in 1916. Little Bear died in 1921. Ultimately Little Bear Cree and those descendants of the Riel Rebellion leaders made up 406 of the McLaughlin Roll. Only 45 of those who were on the 1908 Wheat roll managed to secure membership at the Rocky Boy's reservation, which had been authorized for Rocky Boy's Band of Chippewa Indians." <64th Congress>: Be it enacted by the Senate and House of Representatives of the United States of America in Congress assembled, That the Act approved February eleventh, nineteen hundred and fifteen (Thirty-eighth Statutes at Large, page eight hundred and seven), entitled "An Act authorizing the Secretary of the Interior to survey the lands of the abandoned Fort Assinniboine Military Reservation and open the same to settlement," be, and the same is hereby, amended by the addition thereto of the following sections:

"SEC. 10. That fractional townships twenty-eight north, ranges fifteen and sixteen east, and fractional townships twenty-nine north, ranges fourteen and fifteen east, Montana principal meridian, within the boundaries of said reservation, embracing a total area of approximately fifty-six thousand and thirty-five acres, are hereby set apart as a reservation for Rocky Boy's Band of Chippewas and such other homeless Indians in the State of Montana as the Secretary of the Interior may see fit to locate thereon, and the said Secretary is authorized, in his discretion, to allot the lands within the reservation hereby created under the provisions of the general allotment Act of February eighth, eighteen hundred and eighty-seven (Twenty"fourth Statutes at Large, page three hundred and eighty-eight), as amended.

Cree nativity to Montana is disputed by Chippewa who contend that during the negotiations of the treaties that encompass the area of Montana, the noted Smithsonian ethnologist, John C. Ewers found not a single member of Little Bear's band, who were now on the 1917 McLaughlin Roll of the US. Department of the Interior; were born in the treaty land cede area. Therefore, the U.S. Indian Claims Commission dismissed Cree treaty claims <Docket 191 221, U.S. Claims Commission>. Still further, the Canadian Council Privy attempted to work with U.S. authorities to exert authority to return the Little Bear Band to Canada, prior to the 1896 Act of Deportation.

- Rocky Boy (c.1852-d. 1916) Asiniweyin, more correctly called Stone Being. The true origin of Asiniweyin, he was born in Chippewa Falls, Wisconsin. He was a member of the Red Robe Band, Red Robe, or Moose Dung, was a signor of the 1864 Pembina Treaty. Other sources say he was born in Wisconsin and migrated to the Montana region in the 1880s. Rocky Boy claimed to be native to southwest Montana and may have lived in southern Idaho. He became a popular leader in the early 1900s among both the Chippewa and the European Americans. He managed to gain Executive Orders by United States presidents to set aside land for two Chippewa-Cree reservations in northeastern Montana. Rocky Boy died in 1916, before Congress officially established the Rocky Boy's Reservation. Some sources have speculated he was assassinated, including noted Smithsonian historian and expert on Plains tribal culture, John C. Ewers. Frank Bird Linderman's correspondence with Chippewa Chief Big Rock also indicated Big Rock explained not only Rocky Boy's assassination, but Big Rock's own son's were also assassinated by rival Cree in the Ft. Assiniboine area in the days after Chief Rocky Boy's death.<Linderman Papers, Plains Indian Museum, Browning, MT>
- Pennato: The brother of Rocky Boy, Pennato had suggested that the Fort Assinniboine Military Reservation become a new closed Chippewa-Cree Reservation. In December 1911, Pennato and 150 Chippewa fled the Babb Chippewa Reservation. (Source needed).

With respect to enrollment in Rocky Boy, because the reservation was established by an Act of Congress for "Rocky Boy's Band of Chippewa Indians and such other homeless Indians," the language of the law was intended in 1908 by Chief Rocky Boy and Thralls B. Wheat, to leave the door to enrollment open to his brethren who were away on a hunt at the time of the Wheat Census. <Chippewa oral history of the Robert Gopher family>. The Chief Big Rock family were away as was often done, Chippewa bands separate during hunting excursions, hunting in western Montana. Because they were not directly enumerated in the Wheat census, Chief Rocky Boy inserted the language of the Act to include Big Rock's extended family. The language of the Act was not intended to include anyone other than the whole Rocky Boy band, and was limited to Big Rock's family. Ironically, Big Rock is listed on the 1917 McLaughlin census. Chief Big Rock's place of birth is listed as Red Lake, Minnesota. This is the true and legitimate successor to Chief Rocky Boy. Some oral history has indicated Big Rock was Chief Rocky Boy's brother, moreover, Chippewa have held Big Rock to be the main "ogemaw" and Rocky Boy was more of a spokesman to him, or a sub-chief. Only the present day Bearwalker family line are the living descendants of Chief Big Rock. After Little Bear took over the affairs of the soon to be established reservation, and the flight to Chief Mountain—Big Rock's family perished on Chief Mountain, from the combined effects of tuberculosis and starvation.

Chief Rocky Boy had been under increased pressure to add the Cree and Metis to his rolls by government officials. Even after the reservation was to be created, in the spring of 1916, Frank Bird Linderman met with Chief Big Rock in northside, Great Falls, and other Chippewa tribesmen including Standing Rock, Pat Raspberry, Crazy Boy (Chief Rocky Boy's brother), and Charles Mosney. On his death bed, and his last letter to Frank B. Linderman, Rocky Boy stated "I don't know if I will ever see you again, Little Bear (referring to their inclusion, along with Metis led by Kennawash)... is trying to get them all in. It is up to my band of Chippewa Indians to let them in." Rocky Boy's understanding of the working of tribal sovereignty is correct. <Worcester v. Georgia, 31 U.S. (6 Pet.) 515 (1832)>.

There is a legal theoretical split, those that attempt to document and claim a Chippewa Cree identity, and the original descendants of Rocky boy's Chippewa band who reject these claims. Ethnologist John C. Ewers writes in Ethnological report on the Chippewa Cree tribe of the Rocky Boy Reservation and the Little Shell band of Indians / [by] John C. Ewers. History of the Cree Indian territorial expansion from the Hudson Bay area to the interior Saskatchewan and Missouri plains [by] Floyd W. Sharrock [and] Susan R. Sharrock.

Ewers, John Canfield. Ethnological report on the Chippewa Cree tribe of the Rocky Boy Reservation and the Little Shell band of Indians / [by] John C. Ewers. History of the Cree Indian territorial expansion from the Hudson Bay area to the interior Saskatchewan and Missouri plains [by] Floyd W. Sharrock [and] Susan R. Sharrock Published New York : Garland Pub. Inc., 1974.

The Chippewa view the Department of the Interior's mishandling of the 1908 roll, the raising of an illegal 1917 McLaughlin Roll, and the mismanaged Pembina judgments as overreaching paternalism roundly rejected by the majority of U.S. tribes into one tribe's affairs. Ewers wrote "it will be for courts to decide if a Chippewa Cree tribe existed prior to 1935," foretelling the contemporary conflict. To the trained ethnologist's eye, the writing was on the wall 40 years ago. Ewers also correctly predicted this matter would ultimately be decided on contentious terms, most likely the courts.

The constitution provides for enrollment for a member of the "Chippewa Cree Tribe." Namely, the Constitution allows any Indian not otherwise enrolled in MT, to enroll," unofficially, it allows any Indian who has simultaneous enrollment in Canada to enroll <BIA Area Director Keith Beartusk> It unofficially provides for Cree blood quantum, even though the Cree tribe does not have a U.S. treaty.

== Band of Chippewa Council ==
In late 2014, Glenn Gopher, an oral historian and enrolled member of the Blackfeet Tribe, of Great Falls, Duncan Standing Rock Sr., and Rocky Boy Jr. Slimjohn (Deceased: 02/16/2017), of White Swan, Washington, oversaw the effort of the Rocky Boy Band of Chippewa to assert their sovereignty in a historic return to self-government. Former members of the Business Committee had committed extensive embezzlement and were convicted of theft. The Chippewa people asserted that their sovereignty had been thwarted by extensive mismanagement by the Department of the Interior since historic times.

The Chippewa have begun extensive efforts to reach out to the Billings Area office of the BIA to restore self-government. Under the Obama Administration's new Guardians Project, administered by the Department of Interior,, there had been increased enforcement through investigation and prosecution of crimes. The convictions of the Adoptee Business Committee resulted from such prosecution.

The Chippewa people never approved the constitution as passed by the Business Committee. The constitution does not provide for specific Chippewa representation in the tribal electoral system. Chippewa are outnumbered on their own reservation by a 10:1 ratio. This threatens the political integrity of the band, and the Chippewa people are working to address it. intend to address.

The Chippewa people are working to address enrollment and voting abuses on the reservation. Most recently, Fr. Pete Guthneck, a non-Indian honorary tribal member, voted in the tribal election, thereby invalidating the election. His standing was challenged by Jonathan Windy Boy, an adoptee who is not a direct descendant of the tribe.

The Chippewa will enforce their right to conduct an audit after pervasive abuse of the tribal enrollment system, and the presence of outright fraud on the part of the Business Committee and the Interior agency who have colluded to strip the Chippewa people of sovereignty. The interim council consists of blood descendants of the Blackfeet Tribe, Browning, Montana, and of the original Rocky Boy's Band of Chippewa Indians, who will audit the largely adoptee roll. The proposed interim council consists of Glenn Gopher, Blackfeet Tribal member; Duncan Standing Rock Jr., Chippewa Cree Tribe; Blair Gopher, Blackfeet Tribal member; Delores Chippewa, Chippewa-Cree Tribe; Nora Nelson, Chippewa Cree Tribe; Barbara Standing Rock, Chippewa Cree Tribe; Melinda Gopher, Blackfeet Tribal member; and Calvin Twoteeth, Chippewa Cree Tribe (pending).

== See also ==
- Fort Assinniboine
- List of Indian reservations in the United States
- Bear Paw Ski Bowl

== Notes and references ==
- Rocky Boy Reservation and Off-Reservation Trust Land, Montana United States Census Bureau
