= Tribal Lending Enterprise =

Native American financial services company

A Tribal Lending Enterprise (TLE) is a type of American financial services and lending organization owned and operated by a federally-recognized Native American tribal government. Native American tribal governments have established TLEs to further expand their business portfolios beyond traditional industries associated with tribal economies, such as gaming, payday lending, natural resources, and government contracting. Native American tribal lending is often operated through an online hub, based on sovereign tribal land, and offering loans to consumers (government-to-consumer lending).

== History ==
Native American tribes have diversified revenue streams in internet-based consumer lending through tribal lending enterprises that are often financed by a third (outside) party. As arms of the tribe, tribal lending entities benefit from the tribes' sovereign immunity in relation to state-based consumer lending regulation; "as nations that predate the Constitution and the United States, tribal nations can generally operate in licensed environments independent of state regulation."

== Legal arguments and sovereignty ==
Tribal lending enterprises (TLEs) operate under the principle of tribal sovereignty – a status under U.S. law recognizing tribes' authority over their internal affairs, subject only to limits imposed by the federal government. Supporters of TLEs argue that these ventures are legitimate exercises of sovereignty, playing a crucial role in advancing economic independence for Native American communities. Many tribal lending operations have become important sources of revenue, employment opportunities, and funds for essential government programs within tribal communities, particularly in geographically isolated or economically disadvantaged areas. In some cases, online lending has provided over half of a tribe’s operating budget.

Legal debates surrounding tribal lending focus primarily on jurisdictional issues and the scope of tribal sovereign immunity. Courts have rendered mixed decisions in this area. Several rulings affirm that tribally owned lenders, considered arms of tribal governments, enjoy sovereign immunity protecting them from certain state regulations or lawsuits. In Williams v. Big Picture Loans (2019), the Fourth Circuit Court of Appeals ruled that a tribally affiliated lending company was an "arm of the tribe" entitled to immunity from state usury claims. Conversely, other court decisions have placed limits on TLEs by enforcing federal consumer protection laws or invalidating contractual provisions based solely on tribal law.

== Examples ==
Examples of Tribal Lending Enterprises include the Turtle Mountain Band of Chippewa Indians, Picayune Rancheria of Chukchansi Indians, Plain Green Loans, Chippewa Cree and others.
