= Rocky Boy West, Montana =

- Census-designated place
- Location in the state of Montana
- Coordinates: 48°17′54″N 109°59′50″W
- Country: United States
- State: Montana
- Counties: Chouteau, Hill

Area
  - Total: 5.45 sq mi (14.11 km^{2})
  - Land: 5.45 sq mi (14.11 km^{2})
  - Water: 0 sq mi (0.00 km^{2})
- Elevation: 2,776 ft (846 m)

Population (2020)
  - Total: 1,042
  - Density: 191.3/sq mi (73.87/km^{2})
- Time zone: UTC-7 (Mountain (MST))
  - Summer (DST): UTC-6 (MDT)
- Area code: 406
- FIPS code: 30-63928
- GNIS feature ID: 2585653

Rocky Boy West is a census-designated place (CDP) in Hill and Chouteau counties in the U.S. state of Montana. As of the 2020 census, Rocky Boy West had a population of 1,042.

== Geography ==
Rocky Boy West is located in southeastern Hill County and northeastern Chouteau County in the northwest part of the Rocky Boy Indian Reservation. It is bordered by the community of Box Elder to the northwest. U.S. Route 87 crosses the northwest corner of the CDP, leading northeast 23 miles (37 km) to Havre and southwest 48 miles (77 km) to Fort Benton.

According to the United States Census Bureau, the Parker School CDP has a total area of 5.4 square miles (14.1 km^{2}), all land.

== Demographics ==
Historical population
Census	Pop.	Note	%±
2020	1,042		—
U.S. Decennial Census
