= Rocky Boy's Agency, Montana =

- CDP
- Location of Rocky Boy'sAgency, Montana
- Coordinates: 48°15′26″N 109°45′22″W
- Country: United States
- State: Montana
- County: Hill

Area
  - Total: 8.58 sq mi (22.23 km^{2})
  - Land: 8.58 sq mi (22.22 km^{2})
  - Water: 0.0039 sq mi (0.01 km^{2})
- Elevation: 3,960 ft (1,210 m)

Population (2020)
  - Total: 404
  - Density: 47.1/sq mi (18.18/km^{2})
- Time zone: UTC-7 (Mountain (MST))
  - Summer (DST): UTC-6 (MDT)
- Area code: 406
- FIPS code: 30-00587
- GNIS feature ID: 2409197

Rocky Boy's Agency is a census-designated place (CDP) in Hill County, Montana, United States. As of the 2020 census, Rocky Boy's Agency had a population of 404. The settlement developed around the US Indian agency for the Rocky Boy's Indian Reservation.

== Geography ==
According to the United States Census Bureau, the CDP has a total area of 8.6 square miles (22 km^{2}), of which 8.6 square miles (22 km^{2}) is land and 0.12% is water.

== Demographics ==
Historical population
Census	Pop.	Note	%±
2020	404		—
U.S. Decennial Census

As of the census of 2000, there were 324 people, 79 households, and 65 families residing in the CDP. The population density was 37.8 inhabitants per square mile (14.6/km^{2}). There were 90 housing units at an average density of 10.5/sq mi (4.1/km^{2}). The racial makeup of the CDP was 93.52% Native American, 5.56% White, 0.31% Asian, and 0.62% from two or more races. Hispanic or Latino of any race were 0.93% of the population.

There were 79 households, out of which 44.3% had children under the age of 18 living with them, 49.4% were married couples living together, 24.1% had a female householder with no husband present, and 17.7% were non-families. 15.2% of all households were made up of individuals, and 6.3% had someone living alone who was 65 years of age or older. The average household size was 4.10 and the average family size was 4.60.

In the CDP, the population was spread out, with 45.4% under the age of 18, 8.0% from 18 to 24, 26.5% from 25 to 44, 13.3% from 45 to 64, and 6.8% who were 65 years of age or older. The median age was 21 years. For every 100 females, there were 103.8 males. For every 100 females age 18 and over, there were 98.9 males.

The median income for a household in the CDP was $22,308, and the median income for a family was $35,000. Males had a median income of $22,917 versus $31,250 for females. The per capita income for the CDP was $12,990. About 15.0% of families and 23.9% of the population were below the poverty line, including 37.7% of those under age 18 and 31.0% of those age 65 or over.

== Education ==
Rocky Boy High School is located in town. The Rocky Boy School District headquarters are in Box Elder.
