= Swan Valley Massacre of 1908 =

Native American massacre in Montana

The Swan Valley Massacre happened in 1908 in which four Pend d'Oreilles Indians, members of an eight-person hunting party, were killed by a state game warden and his deputy in the Swan Valley in northwestern Montana. The state of Montana did not honor off-reservation hunting permits, although the hunting right was established by federal treaty. The game warden confronted the Pend d'Oreilles party and a gunfight ensued.

== Background ==
The Bitterroot Salish (Flathead) and Pend d’Oreille (Kalispel) tribes of the Northern Rocky Mountain (Plateau) region of the Western United States had long occupied the area around Flathead Lake as their traditional territory. Their culture included hunting and gathering for their food. The Salish were known to war with the Blackfeet and Shoshone. With the rise of the fur trade with Europeans in the late eighteenth century, many Salish and Pend d’Oreilles became involved as trappers and traders. The Salish were visited by the Lewis and Clark expedition in 1805, who traded gifts of goods and horses with them.

In the early 19th century, Jesuit Catholic missionaries, primarily French-speaking, came to live among the Salish in the Bitterroot Valley with the intent of converting the natives. They built a church. In 1855, Washington Territory Governor Isaac Stevens called the Salish, Pend d’Oreilles, and Ksanka Band of Kootenai together to negotiate the Hellgate Treaty. By this treaty, the U.S. government established a reservation for and a peaceful confederation of these tribes.

== Confrontation ==
According to the 1855 treaty, the confederated tribes retained the right to hunt, gather, and fish in their aboriginal territory, some of which was outside the reservation boundaries. After Montana acquired statehood in 1889, it established its own hunting and fishing regulations, to be enforced by game wardens. Only the federal government had jurisdiction within reservation borders, but in other areas, Montana state officials believed they had authority to regulate Native Americans as well as non-Native Americans.

In September 1908 a party of eight Pend d’Oreille entered the ancient hunting grounds of the Swan Valley on the eastern side of the Mission Mountain range. The party members included Atwen Scwi, his wife, son, and daughter; Little Camille Paul and his pregnant wife; and two elders, Mary and her husband Martin Yellow Mountain. Before they had left the reservation, they purchased state hunting permits to avoid trouble, although this was not required under the Hellgate Treaty (Yellow Mountain cleared permission for the expedition from the Indian agent in Arlee).

In October, after the hunting party had camped for several weeks, Charles Peyton, a state game warden, together with a few deputized residents of the valley, entered the encampment three times to investigate the party. He demanded hunting licenses and harassed the band. Peyton returned the next day with guns drawn, and demanded that the Pend d'Oreille leave by the next morning. To avoid confrontation, the band decided to move and began to pack up the camp.

The next day, before the party could pack and mount their horses to leave (they had been delayed by two of their horses wandering away and having to retrieve them), Peyton arrived with his deputy, 32-year-old Herman Rudolph.

Peyton shot Camille Paul and Atwen, the two leaders of the party, who were unable to reach their guns. When Yellow Mountain tried to reach his weapon, Peyton shot him as well. As the women fled toward the edge of the clearing, Peyton chased them. Atwen’s son Peh-lah-so-weh found a gun and shot Peyton, hitting him in the stomach. The warden’s deputy Herman Rudolph shot Peh-lah-so-weh at the same time, killing him almost instantly.

As the women tended to the dead and dying members of the party, Peyton began to get back up. Camille’s wife, Clarice, fearful that Peyton would try to kill the rest of them, pulled her husband's rifle from under his body and shot twice at Peyton, leaving him dead.

Though six months pregnant, Clarice rode to another Pend d’Oreille camp to seek help. When she arrived, the band of Many Names (Louie Mollman) took her in and tended to her. When Many Names’ party returned the next day to recover the bodies, they encountered a non-Indian posse. Many Names warriors declined to attack.

== Aftermath ==
Rudolph was scheduled for a county coroner’s appearance but left the area and was never prosecuted. The Pend d'Oreille reinterred the bodies of their four dead at the St. Ignatius Catholic cemetery.

Clarice gave birth to her son, naming him John Peter Paul. He grew up telling the story of his mother and their hunting party for years. The tribe cut back on hunting parties outside the reservation for fear of similar attacks.
