= Hill 57 =

Coordinates: 47.525°N 111.335°W

Hill 57 is a sandstone-capped hill on the benchland northwest of Great Falls, Montana, United States. The origin of the name is in dispute, but probably derives from an advertisement for "Heinz 57" food products that was created on the hillside in the early 20th century. Hill 57 was home to a small and poverty-stricken community of Cree, Métis, and Ojibwe (also known as Chippewa) Native Americans from about the 1880s to the 1960s. Although much reduced in number, some of these landless Native Americans continue to reside on Hill 57. The extreme economic deprivation of Native Americans in the area led to the term "Hill 57" becoming a symbol and "a byword for urban Indian poverty". This community subsequently became the most widely cited example of "landless Indians" in Montana.

== Geology ==
Hill 57 is a low-rise plateau located adjacent to the city limits of Great Falls, Montana, about 2,000 feet (610 m) north of 9th Avenue North/Northwest Bypass on Stuckey Road and abutting to the Valley View neighborhood.

Hill 57 consists of rock belonging to the Colorado Group, a stratigraphic unit consisting largely of shale. Within this group is a subunit known as the Blackleaf Formation (or the Albian Formation), a shale with a small proportion of fine-to-medium grain sandstone. At the bottom of the Blackleaf Formation is another geologic subunit, the Flood Member, a sandstone consisting of layers (from top to bottom) of very hard calcareous sandstone, fissile sandstone with concretions of ironstone or stained limestone, and medium-hard light-colored sandstone. Flood Member rock makes up the majority of the rock beneath Hill 57. A very hard, undefined sandstone structure, described by geologists as "massive" in size, sits atop the hill.

About 65,000 years ago, before the Iowa Period of the Wisconsin glaciation, the Missouri River flowed north rather than east. The river laid down a fluvial terrace consisting of quartzite gravel. A layer of this gravel, about 15 to 20 feet (4.6 to 6.1 m) deep, now covers the top and sides of Hill 57. (Note: This gravel is derived from Belt Series rock, a Precambrian metasedimentary rock.)

About 15,000 years ago, the Laurentide Ice Sheet blocked the north-flowing Missouri River, creating Lake Great Falls. Lake silt in turn covered this gravel, creating the current topsoil of Hill 57. About 13,000 years ago, the ice sheet retreated and Lake Great Falls drained. This exposed Hill 57, which has retained this form into the current period.

Hill 57 is distinguished from Mount Royal, a somewhat taller adjacent hill/plateau to the north and northwest.

== Name ==
Sources vary widely as to the origin of the name "Hill 57". The most complete version of the name's original was reported by Ralph Pomnichowski in the Great Falls Tribune in 2009, who wrote that, in 1926, Heinz 57 salesman Art Hinck (or Henck) arranged rocks on the hill into the form of a gigantic "57" and then painted them white. Historian Don Peterson relates substantially the same story, although he says the advertisement was created about 1900. Historian Jeanne Eder has written that the advertisement went up during administration of President Theodore Roosevelt, which puts its creation between September 1901 and March 1909. Attorney Ellen Thompson, who has written about the landless Native Americans living at the site, also says that a Heinz 57 salesman arranged rocks on the hill in the form of a giant "57", although she does not say whether they were painted white or not. Others sources agree that the "57" was an advertisement (although they are not specific as to the form it took), while some say that it was "painted" but do not specify whether it was on the grass, on rocks, or took some other form. Historian Matthew Basso does not identify Art Hinck as the creator of the advertisement, but merely says the individual was a "pickle salesman".

Sources agree that the advertisement could be seen for miles.

Two alternative origins for the name "Hill 57" have also been suggested. Historian Ken Robison says that, in addition to the Heinz advertisement, Hill 57 was named for James J. Hill, chief executive officer of the Great Northern Railway and a close friend of Great Falls founder Paris Gibson. In 1969, Representative John Melcher cited "legend" that the hill's name came from the large number of "Heinz 57" cans strewn over the landscape there.

As of 2009, the "57" advertisement could no longer be seen on the hill.

=== Great Falls High School logo ===
Since the 1920s, students from Great Falls High School have maintain a giant "GF" logo on the side of Hill 57. The logo is composed of whitewashed stones, which GFHS students regularly repaint and keep in place.

== Native American presence ==
=== Hill 57 camp ===
Just when the Hill 57 area was occupied by Native Americans is not clear. Some sources put the date at about 1900. A major drought which hit Montana in 1917 (and lasted until 1920) drove many landless Native Americans off the plains and into these settlements near Great Falls.

Initially, landless Native Americans settled on the west bank of the Missouri River south of the Fox Farm neighborhood. But the most permanent settlements were on Hill 57, Mount Royal, along Wire Mill Road in Black Eagle (an unincorporated village on the north bank of the river where the Anaconda Copper smelter was located), near the Great Falls Meat Packing Plant (now demolished, but then located several hundred feet north of 5700 18th Avenue N.), and on the bank of the Missouri River near what is now Sacajawea Island. White residents of Great Falls derided these areas by calling them "moccasin flats".

Winters at the Hill 57 camp were incredibly harsh. While many Native American families survived during the summer by picking food, clothing, and firewood out of the town garbage dump, snow and ice precluded such scavenging during the winter. Many families turned to the county government during the winter, and received minimal assistance that enabled them to survive.

In 1917, at the start of World War I, Anaconda Copper began hiring large numbers of local landless Indians for work in their smelter. (Note: Landless Native Americans living near the meatpacking plant had long found occasional work there.) The Great Depression, which began in October 1929, caused copper prices to plunge and the plant closed on May 7, 1932. Angry white workers blamed the Native Americans for taking their jobs and stealing equipment from the plant, and burned the Indian camps around Great Falls to the ground. The vast majority of Native Americans then removed to Hill 57, which at that time was owned by a woman of Native American descent.

By 1937, a number of Native American families had moved from Hill 57 to the unused land north of Wire Mill Road.

Hill 57 was occupied by several hundred Native Americans into the 1970s. As of 2013, however, it was largely deserted. Nevertheless, the landless Native American presence remains strong in Great Falls, with about 3,000 Little Shell Chippewa living in the city.

== In popular culture ==
The Native Americans of Hill 57 and their desperate poverty were the subject of The American Stranger, an hour-long NBC News special report which aired in November 1958. The broadcast harshly condemned the U.S. government's Indian termination policy, and used the Hill 57 community as an example of what the policy would entail. Historian Pamela Wilson has called the broadcast "the most significant interpretation of the termination crisis" ever to air on American television.

== Bibliography ==
- Alden, William C. (1932). Physiography and Glacial Geology of Eastern Montana and Adjacent Areas. U.S. Geological Survey Professional Paper 174. Washington, D.C.: U.S. Government Printing Office.
- Barnhill, John H. (2013). "Orphans". In Lawson, Russell M. (ed.). Encyclopedia of American Indian Issues Today. Santa Barbara, Calif.: Greenwood Press. ISBN 9780313381447.
- Basso, Matthew (2013). Meet Joe Copper: Masculinity and Race on Montana's World War II Home Front. Chicago: University of Chicago Press. ISBN 9780226038865.
- Bureau of Land Management (March 1960). Land Planning and Classification Report: Public Domain Lands, Milk River Area, Montana. Denver: U.S. Department of the Interior. hdl:2027/uiug.30112059619954.
- Campbell, Gregory R. (1994). "Cree". In Davis, Mary B. (ed.). Native America in the Twentieth Century: An Encyclopedia. New York: Garland Publishing. ISBN 9780824048464.
- Clawson, Roger; Shandera, Katherine A. (1998). Billings: The City and the People. Helena, Mont.: Farcountry Press. ISBN 9781560370376.
- Eder, Jeanne Marie Oyawin (1983). Chief Little Shell's Tribe of Landless Chippewa Indians of Montana: A Question of Recognition (PDF) (M.A.). Montana State University.
- Gallant, Frank K. (2012). A Place Called Peculiar: Stories About Unusual American Place-Names. Mineola, N.Y.: Dover Publishing. ISBN 9780486483603.
- Hansen, W.B. (2000). "Road Log—Field Trip 2, August 15–16, 2000". In Schalla, Robert A.; Johnson, Eric H. (eds.). Montana/Alberta Thrust Belt and Adjacent Foreland: Road Logs, Presentation Abstracts, and Foothills Analyses. Volume II. Billings, Mont.: Montana Geological Society. ISBN 9781878018069.
- Henry, Ralph Chester (1950). The Majestic Land: Peaks, Parks and Prevaricators of the Rockies and Highlands of the Northwest. New York: Bobbs-Merrill.
- Hill, Christopher L.; Valppu, Seppo H. (1997). "Geomorphic Relationships and Paleoenvironmental Context of Glaciers, Fluvial Deposits, and Glacial Lake Great Falls, Montana". Current Research in the Pleistocene.
- Keroher, Grace C. (1966). Lexicon of Geologic Names of the United States for 1936-1960. Part 1. Washington, D.C.: U.S. Government Printing Office.
- Lewis, P.J. (1959). "Mission Canyon Bioherms of Northeast Montana". In Hammond, C.R.; Trapp, Henry Jr. (eds.). 10th Anniversary Field Conference, August 13-15, 1959. Sawtooth-Disturbed Belt Area. Billings, Mont.: Billings Geological Society.
- Malone, Michael P.; Roeder, Richard B.; Lang, William L. (1991). Montana: A History of Two Centuries. Seattle: University of Washington Press. ISBN 9780295971209.
- Malone, Michael (2006). The Battle for Butte: Mining and Politics on the Northern Frontier, 1864-1906. Seattle: University of Washington Press. ISBN 9780295986074.
- "The Montana Almanac". Missoula, Mont.: Montana State University. 1958.
- Peterson, Don (2010). Great Falls. Charleston, S.C.: Arcadia Publishing. ISBN 9780738580845.
- Robison, Ken (2011). Cascade County and Great Falls. Charleston, S.C.: Arcadia Publishing. ISBN 9780738581927.
- Robison, Robison (2015). "Breaking Racial Barriers: 'Everyone's Welcome' at the Ozark Club—Great Falls, Montana's African American Nightclub". In Swartout, Robert R. (ed.). Montana: A Cultural Medley. Helena, Mont.: Farcountry Press. ISBN 9781560376125.
- Select Committee on Indian Affairs (1982). Use and Distribution of Pembine Chippewa Indian Judgment Funds. U.S. Senate. 97th Cong., 2d sess. Washington, D.C.: U.S. Government Printing Office. hdl:2027/pur1.32754074489224.
- Select Committee on Nutrition and Human Needs (1969). Nutrition and Human Needs. U.S. Senate. 90th Cong., 2d sess., and 91st Cong., 1st sess. Washington, D.C.: U.S. Government Printing Office. hdl:2027/mdp.35112202636314.
- Sonneborn, Liz (2007). Chronology of American Indian History. New York: Facts on File. ISBN 9780816067701.
- Subcommittees of the Committees on Interior and Insular Affairs (1954). Termination of Federal Supervision Over Certain Tribes of Indians. Part 1. U.S. Congress. 83d Cong., 2d sess. Washington, D.C.: U.S. Government Printing Office. hdl:2027/umn.31951d02087130f.
- Wilson, Pamela (1998). "Confronting "the Indian Problem": Media Discourses of Race, Ethnicity, Nation, and Empire in 1950s America". In Torres, Sasha (ed.). Living Color: Race and Television in the United States. Durham, N.C.: Duke University Press. ISBN 9780822321781.
