= Chippewa Cree =

Federally recognized Native American tribe in Montana, United States

Chippewa Cree Indians of the Rocky Boy's Reservation
ᐅᒋᐻᐤ ᓀᐃᔭᐤ

Total population
- 5,656 enrolled (3,323 per the 2010 census)

Regions with significant populations
- United States (Montana)

Languages
- English, Cree, Ojibwe

Religion
- Midewiwin, Christianity (Catholicism, Methodism)

Related ethnic groups
- other Ojibwe and Cree peoples

The Chippewa Cree Indians of the Rocky Boy's Reservation (Officially in Cree: ᐅᒋᐻᐤ ᓀᐃᔭᐤ, romanized: ocipwêw nêiyaw) is a federally recognized Native American tribe on the Rocky Boy's Reservation in Montana. They who are descendants of Cree and Métis who migrated south from Canada and Chippewa (Ojibwe) who moved west from the Turtle Mountains in North Dakota in the late 19th century.

The different peoples spoke related but distinct Algonquian languages.

This tribe is the southernmost Cree tribe in North America.

Rocky Boy's Indian Reservation is located in Hill and Chouteau counties in northeastern Montana, about 40 miles (64 km) from the Canada–United States border. It has a total land area of 171.4 square miles (443.9 km^{2}), which includes extensive off-reservation trust lands. The population was 3,323 at the 2010 census. The Bureau of Indian Affairs' Labor Force Report of 2005 reported 5,656 enrolled citizens of the tribe.

Map of Rocky Boy's Reservation and nearby reservations (In orange).

== History ==
The Chippewa Chief Asiniiwin (Stone Child, often incorrectly translated as Rocky Boy), Chief Little Bear (Cree), and their bands founded the Rocky Boy's Indian Reservation in north-central Montana.

In the early 20th century, Chippewa and Cree lived throughout present-day Montana, on the Blackfeet and other reservations, as well as in the new towns developed by European-American settlers and immigrants. In January 1902,Asiniiwin petitioned President Theodore Roosevelt for a closed reservation so the landless Chippewa-Cree could settle and get an education. The citizens were counted in a 1909 census conducted by Thralls B. Wheat, a land allotment agent of the Department of the Interior. This census was certified by the agency in April 1909.

Reflecting the social turmoil of the time, many of Asiniiwin's people left the reservation within a decade; others had never relocated there, and their descendants live in towns throughout the Pacific Northwest. For instance, many bought plots of land on Hill 57, outside Great Falls, Montana. Congress passed legislation on September 7, 1916, (39 Stat. 739) creating the Rocky Boy's Indian Reservation. Those Chippewa-Cree living near Great Falls were not counted as citizens in the 1917 census of the reservation but were part of the tribe.

In May 1917, the Interior Department compiled another list of residents on the reservation. By then additional Native Americans had migrated there and others had left. Fewer than 45 of the 451 names listed on the "Tentative Roll of the Rocky Boy Indian Reservation" (1917) were Chippewa from the earlier 1909 roll. Many were Cree, descendants of Little Bear's (Imasees) band, and Métis, descendants of the Louis Riel band of mixed-race peoples from the Red River of the North area. According to tribal traditions of absorbing war captives and protecting all children of tribal women, if residents identified as Cree or Chippewa, they were listed as Native American, regardless of whether they had other ancestry. The 1917 roll was approved by the Department of the Interior in July 1917; it has since been the basis for tribal citizenship rolls and allotments.

The Cree and Métis migrants and their descendants have lived on the Rocky Boy's Reservation under self-declared "adopted" status. They and their descendants provided for such "adopted" status in the Chippewa Cree Tribal Constitution, which was written in 1934–1935. It was certified by the Department of the Interior in 1935 under the Indian Reorganization Act.. The constitution provided that citizens of the tribe who were absent from the reservation for 10 years or more (a ten-year absentee provision) lost their tribal status and were no longer qualified for benefits and citizenship.

The Chippewa Cree Business Committee, the government of the tribe, recently repealed this provision of the Constitution. As the tribe's government, the Committee retains the authority to address citizenship issues. The Cree and Métis make up more than 90% of the enrolled citizens of the tribe.

== Language ==
The principal language of the tribe is Cree, written in Eastern Cree syllabics. There are programs and courses dedicated to the preservation and teaching of the Cree language to the younger generation. There are also efforts to use revenue from sale of Official Tribal vehicle license plate would be used for installation of Cree signage in the community as well as investment in other language revitalization programs.

The status of the Chippewa (Ojibwe) language in the tribe is dire, as there is only one known living speaker of the language after the death of Duncan Standing Rock Sr. in February 2021. Standing Rock was an integral part of efforts to record and document the language.

== Economy ==
As part of its economic development, the tribe started a business "Plain Green Loans" for online lending to Native Americans who are underserved by the lack of banks on many reservations. The Tribal Independent reporter Delvin Cree (Turtle Mountain Chippewa), wrote in a 2012 opinion piece that the tribe's practices of high-interest, short-term lending are generally classified as predatory lending. These loans can result in annualized interest rates as high as 360 to 400 percent. In 2022, the company that had paid the tribe to use its tribal sovereignty to claim exemption from state laws paid $44 million to settle a lawsuit for illegal lending practices. Supporters of tribally owned lending enterprises argue that such ventures exemplify self-determined development. Both the Harvard Project on American Indian Economic Development and the National Congress of American Indians (NCAI) have cited tribally run businesses as crucial tools for generating revenue, building governance capacity, and funding essential services.

== See also ==
- Little Shell Tribe of Chippewa Indians of Montana
