= Bears Paw Mountains =

Mountain range in Montana, United States

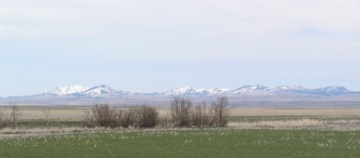
- Bears Paw Mountains as seen from near Virgelle, Montana

Highest point
- Peak: Baldy Mountain
- Elevation: 6,916 ft (2,108 m)

Geography
- Country: United States
- State: Montana
- Range coordinates: 48°12.5′N 109°31.05′W

Geology
- Rock age: Late Cretaceous

The Bears Paw Mountains (Bear Paw Mountains, Bear's Paw Mountains or Bearpaw Mountains) are an insular-montane island range in the Central Montana Alkalic Province in north-central Montana, United States, located approximately 10 miles south of Havre, Montana. Baldy Mountain, which rises 6,916 feet (2,108 m) above sea level, is the highest peak in the range. The Bears Paw Mountains extend in a 45-mile arc between the Missouri River and Rocky Boy Indian Reservation south of Havre.

== Name ==
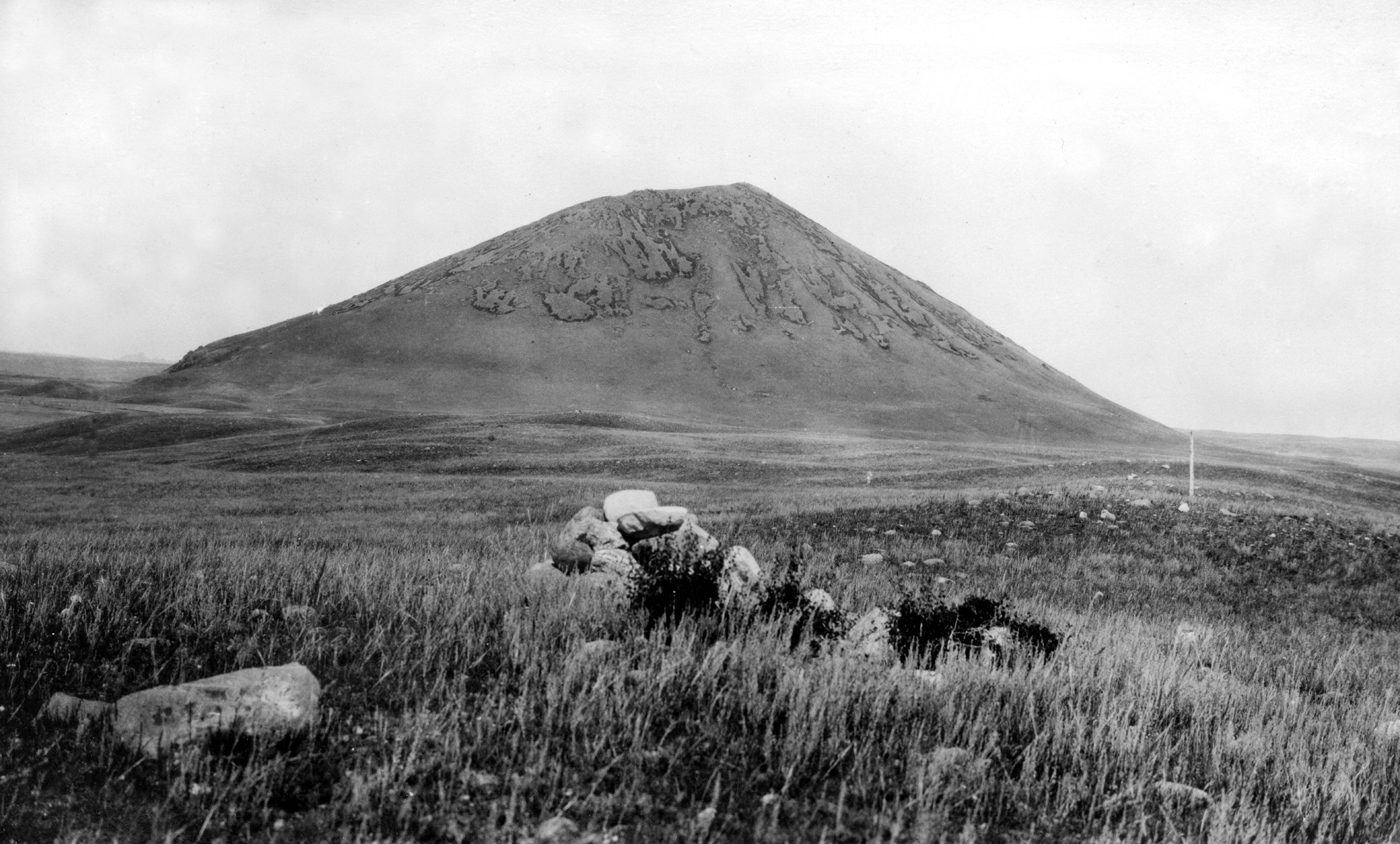
McCann Butte in the Bearpaws, view to the west across glacial moraine. 1920 USGS photograph.

Locals refer to the range as the Bearpaws. Indigenous names include Assiniboine: Waną́be, lit. 'bear paws', Crow: Daxpitcheeischikáate, lit. 'bear's little hand', and Gros Ventre: ʔɔɔwɔ́hʔoouh, lit. 'there are many buttes'.

While highway signs designate the range as the Bears Paw Mountains, historically, the names Bearpaw Mountains and Bear Paw Mountains also have been used, including on early state maps of the region. The U.S. Geological Survey continues to use Bearpaw Mountains on publications.

== Geology ==
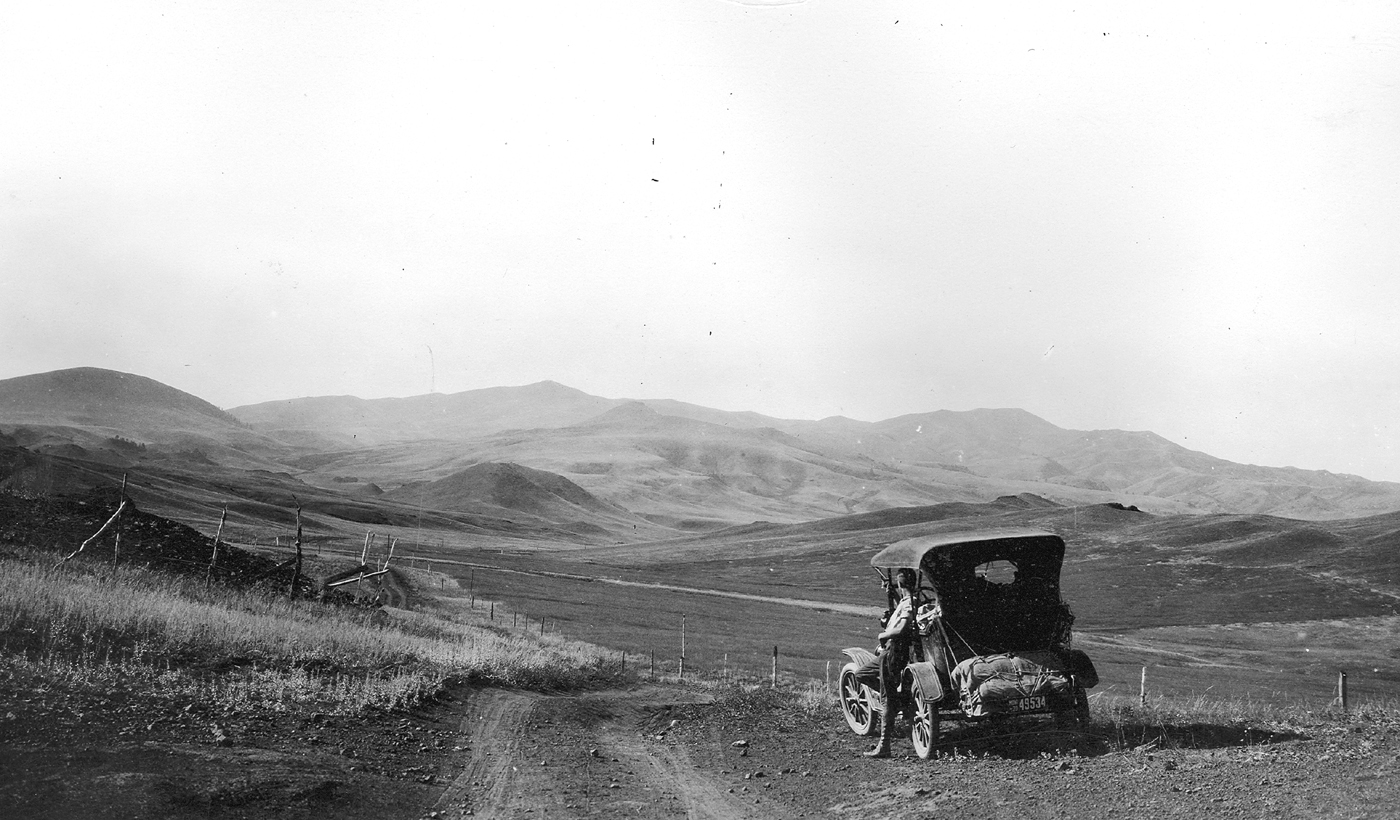
Bearpaw Mountains. View south near Clear Creek, Blaine County, Montana. July 31, 1920.

The core of the Bearpaws are composed of extensive Eocene aged igneous intrusions left over from one of the largest eruptive centers in the Central Montana Alkaline Province. Shonkinite, latite, and tinguatite (intrusive phonolite) are among the most common igneous rock compositions found in the Bearpaws.

The Cretaceous Bearpaw Formation outcrops in these mountains, and is named for the range.

== History ==
Chief Joseph of the Nez Perce surrendered to Col. Nelson Miles in the foothills of the Bear's Paw Mountains in October 1877 after the Battle of Bear Paw.

== Native American legend ==
Native oral history ties the name to a lone hunter in search of deer to feed his clan. He killed a deer but, while returning to the prairie, encountered a bear. The bear held the hunter to the ground, and the hunter appealed to the Great Spirit to release him. The Great Spirit filled the heavens with lightning and thunder, striking the bear dead and severing its paw to release the hunter. Looking at Box Elder Butte, one can see the paw, and Centennial Mountain to the south resembles a reclining bear.

== See also ==
- List of mountain ranges in Montana
