= Box Elder, Montana =

- Census-designated place
- Location within Montana Location within the United States
- Coordinates: 48°19′23″N 110°01′04″W
- Country: United States
- State: Montana
- County: Hill

Area
  - Total: 0.79 sq mi (2.04 km^{2})
  - Land: 0.79 sq mi (2.04 km^{2})
  - Water: 0 sq mi (0.00 km^{2})
- Elevation: 2,671 ft (814 m)

Population (2020)
  - Total: 85
  - Density: 108.1/sq mi (41.74/km^{2})
- Time zone: UTC-7 (Mountain (MST))
  - Summer (DST): UTC-6 (MDT)
- ZIP code: 59521
- Area code: 406
- FIPS code: 30-08725
- GNIS feature ID: 2407897

Box Elder is an unincorporated community and census-designated place (CDP) in Hill County in the U.S. state of Montana. As of the 2020 census, Box Elder had a population of 85. Before 2010 the Box Elder CDP was split into the current much-smaller Box Elder CDP, while most of the former CDP area went into the new Rocky Boy West CDP. Box Elder is the headquarters of the Chippewa-Cree tribe.

The post office was established in 1889. The town was first called "Bremer", the name of an early homesteader. Eventually it was changed to "Box Elder", for the nearby creek lined with box elder trees.

== Geography ==
Box Elder is located near the southern border of Hill County and is bordered to the south and east by the Rocky Boy West CDP. U.S. Route 87 passes through Box Elder, leading northeast 24 miles (39 km) to Havre, the Hill County seat, and southwest 10 miles (16 km) to Big Sandy.

According to the United States Census Bureau, the Box Elder CDP has a total area of 0.77 square miles (2.0 km^{2}), all land.

=== Climate ===
According to the Köppen Climate Classification system, Box Elder has a semi-arid climate, abbreviated "BSk" on climate maps.

== Demographics ==
Historical population
Census	Pop.	Note	%±
2020	85		—
U.S. Decennial Census

As of the census of 2000, there were 794 people, 183 households, and 167 families residing in the CDP. The population density was 138.1 inhabitants per square mile (53.3/km^{2}). There were 190 housing units at an average density of 33.1 per square mile (12.8/km^{2}). The racial makeup of the CDP was 4.16% White, 94.84% Native American, 0.25% from other races, and 0.76% from two or more races. Hispanic or Latino of any race were 2.77% of the population.

There were 183 households, out of which 64.5% had children under the age of 18 living with them, 56.3% were married couples living together, 29.5% had a female householder with no husband present, and 8.2% were non-families. 4.9% of all households were made up of individuals, and 1.6% had someone living alone who was 65 years of age or older. The average household size was 4.34 and the average family size was 4.49.

In the CDP, the population was spread out, with 47.9% under the age of 18, 11.5% from 18 to 24, 27.0% from 25 to 44, 10.1% from 45 to 64, and 3.7% who were 65 years of age or older. The median age was 19 years. For every 100 females there were 88.6 males. For every 100 females age 18 and over, there were 80.0 males.

The median income for a household in the CDP was $19,728, and the median income for a family was $18,913. Males had a median income of $19,773 versus $20,795 for females. The per capita income for the CDP was $6,128. About 47.2% of families and 51.2% of the population were below the poverty line, including 59.1% of those under age 18 and 21.1% of those age 65 or over.

== Education ==
Box Elder Public Schools educates students from kindergarten through 12th grade. They are known as the Bears. Box Elder High School is a Class C school.

Stone Child College is located 8 miles (13 km) east of Box Elder in Boneau.
