= Havre Public Schools =

School district in Montana, United States

Havre Public Schools is a school district headquartered in Havre, Montana.

The district, in Hill County, includes Havre, East End Colony, Havre North, Herron, Hilldale Colony, Saddle Butte, West Havre, and most of Beaver Creek.

== History ==
Dennis Parman serves as superintendent until 2009, when he became the deputy superintendent of the Montana Office of Public Instruction. David Mahon replaced him. In 2010 Mahon resigned and the board accepted his resignation.

In August 2021, during the COVID-19 pandemic in Montana, the district chose to keep masks optional.

== Schools ==
- Havre High School
- Havre Middle School
- Sunnyside Intermediate School
- Lincoln-McKinley Primary School
- Highland Park Early Primary School
