= Ed Hill (politician) =

American politician

Member of the Montana House of Representatives from the 28th district
- In office January 4, 2021 – January 2, 2023
- Preceded by: Jacob Bachmeier
- Succeeded by: Paul Tuss

Personal details
- Born: 1959 (age 66–67) Havre, Montana, U.S.
- Party: Republican

Ed Hill is an American politician from Montana who served as a Republican member of the Montana House of Representatives for district 28.

== Early life ==
Hill was born in 1959 in Havre, Montana. He graduated from Havre High School, and earned an Associate of Arts from Johnson County Community College. He worked for the BNSF Railway.

== Montana House of Representatives ==
Hill was elected to the Montana House of Representatives as a result of the 2020 general election. He assumed office on January 4, 2021. On November 8, 2022, Hill was defeated by Democrat Paul Tuss.

== Personal life ==
Hill is married to Heidi Hill, and they have one daughter.
