= Jacob Bachmeier =

American politician (born 1998)

Member of the Montana House of Representatives from the 28th district
- In office January 2, 2017 – January 4, 2021
- Preceded by: Stephanie Hess
- Succeeded by: Ed Hill

Personal details
- Born: January 29, 1998 (age 28) Havre, Montana, U.S.
- Party: Democratic
- Education: Montana State University–Northern

Jacob Bachmeier (born January 29, 1998) is an American politician who served in the Montana House of Representatives from 2017 through 2021. A member of the Democratic Party, Bachmeier was elected to office at the age of 18, making him the youngest person ever to be elected to the Montana House of Representatives.

== Biography ==
Bachmeier graduated from Havre High School and attended Montana State University–Northern.

=== Political career ===
Bachmeier announced his run for the House in November 2015 when he was a senior in high school. He turned 18 in January 2016, making him an eligible candidate for Montana public office, and picked fellow student Daniel Almas as his campaign manager.

Bachmeier was elected with 53% of the vote, defeating incumbent Republican Stephanie Hess. He was reelected in 2018 with 59% of the vote. In 2017, he was elected chair of the Hill County Democratic Central Committee.

In January 2020, Bachmeier announced he would not run for a third term.

In 2022, Bachmeier ran for a seat in the Montana Senate, seeking to represent District 12 in Great Falls. He lost to Republican Wendy McKamey.

== Personal life ==
Bachmeier is a Christian. His great-grandfather, Charles Manuel, also served in the Montana Legislature.

== Electoral history ==
Montana House District 28 Democratic primary, 2016
Party	Candidate	Votes	%
Democratic	Jacob Bachmeier	656	54.13
Democratic	Will Rawn	556	45.88
Total votes		1,212	100.00

Montana House District 28 election, 2016
Party	Candidate	Votes	%
Democratic	Jacob Bachmeier	2,231	53.45
Republican	Stephanie Hess	1,943	46.55
Total votes		4,174	100.00
