= Lake Thibadeau National Wildlife Refuge =

- IUCN category IV (habitat/species management area)
- Location within the United States
- Location: Hill County, Montana, USA
- Nearest city: Havre, MT
- Coordinates: 48°45′26″N 109°36′03″W
- Area: 3,868 acres (1,565 ha) in 2010
- Established: 1937
- Governing body: U.S. Fish and Wildlife Service
- Website: Lake Thibadeau National Wildlife Refuge

Lake Thibadeau National Wildlife Refuge is a 3,868-acre (1,565 ha) National Wildlife Refuge in the U.S. state of Montana, 15 mi (24 km) northeast of Havre, Montana. This refuge is a part of the Bowdoin Wetland Management District (WMD), and is managed from Bowdoin National Wildlife Refuge. The refuge is an easement refuge almost entirely on privately owned property and consists of grassland, marshes and cropland.
