= Creedman Coulee National Wildlife Refuge =

Easement in Montana, United States

- IUCN category IV (habitat/species management area)
- Location within the United States
- Location: Hill County, Montana, USA
- Nearest city: Havre, MT
- Coordinates: 48°56′41″N 109°46′11″W
- Area: 2,728 acres (1,104 ha)
- Established: 1941
- Governing body: U.S. Fish and Wildlife Service
- Website: Creedman Coulee National Wildlife Refuge

Creedman Coulee National Wildlife Refuge is a 2,728-acre (1,104 ha) National Wildlife Refuge in the northern region of the U.S. state of Montana. This very remote refuge is a part of the Bowdoin Wetland Management District (WMD), and is unstaffed. The refuge consists of only 80 acres (32 ha) that are federally owned, while the remaining 2,648 acres (1,072 ha) is an easement with local landowners and on private property. The refuge is managed from Bowdoin National Wildlife Refuge.
