= Hulett (surname) =

Hulett is a surname. Notable people with the surname include:

- Alistair Hulett (1951–2010), Scottish singer and socialist
- Alta M. Hulett (1854–1877), American lawyer
- Charles Hulett (c. 1700–1735), British stage actor
- DeeAndre Hulett (born 1980), American basketball player
- George A. Hulett (1867–1955), American physical chemist
- John Hulett (1927–2006), American activist
- Liege Hulett (1838–1928), South African businessman
- Otto Hulett (1898–1983), American actor
- Tim Hulett (born 1960), American baseball player
- Tug Hulett (born 1983), American baseball player
- William Hulett (born 1982), American actor
