= List of lakes of Hill County, Montana =

There are at least 16 named lakes and 20 reservoirs in Hill County, Montana.

== Lakes ==
- Amisk Pond, 48°09′49″N 109°40′04″W, el. 4,947 feet (1,508 m)
- Chain of Lakes, 48°39′05″N 110°03′27″W, el. 2,605 feet (794 m)
- Dry Lake, 48°39′25″N 110°09′08″W, el. 2,687 feet (819 m)
- Dry Lake, 48°44′31″N 109°35′25″W, el. 2,648 feet (807 m)
- Grassy Lake, 48°59′53″N 110°12′01″W, el. 2,808 feet (856 m)
- Grassy Lake, 48°44′43″N 109°35′58″W, el. 2,644 feet (806 m)
- Halfway Lake, 48°32′13″N 109°45′14″W, el. 2,579 feet (786 m)
- Hingham Lake, 48°35′49″N 110°31′14″W, el. 3,058 feet (932 m)
- Laird Lake, 48°55′41″N 110°40′14″W, el. 3,110 feet (950 m)
- Lake Thibadeau, 48°45′37″N 109°36′14″W, el. 2,634 feet (803 m)
- Martin Lake, 48°44′11″N 109°30′39″W, el. 2,717 feet (828 m)
- Mud Lake, 48°50′52″N 109°41′23″W, el. 2,730 feet (830 m)
- Prairie Lake, 48°27′08″N 109°54′02″W, el. 2,592 feet (790 m)
- Sage Lake, 48°31′47″N 110°11′16″W, el. 2,785 feet (849 m)
- Stink Lake, 48°30′36″N 109°46′53″W, el. 2,598 feet (792 m)
- Wild Horse Lake, 48°57′38″N 110°03′06″W, el. 2,785 feet (849 m)

== Reservoirs ==
- Bailey Reservoir, 48°28′20″N 110°07′06″W, el. 2,749 feet (838 m)
- Bailey Reservoir, 48°28′30″N 110°06′51″W, el. 2,749 feet (838 m)
- Bearpaw Lake, 48°19′40″N 109°39′33″W, el. 3,602 feet (1,098 m)
- Burkhartsmeyer Reservoir, 48°40′57″N 110°22′13″W, el. 2,871 feet (875 m)
- Creedman Reservoir, 48°57′39″N 109°44′59″W, el. 2,772 feet (845 m)
- Creedman Reservoir, 48°57′36″N 109°45′09″W, el. 2,769 feet (844 m)
- Diversion, 48°46′48″N 109°37′09″W, el. 2,667 feet (813 m)
- East Fork Beaver Creek Reservoir, 48°10′24″N 109°38′15″W, el. 4,695 feet (1,431 m)
- Fresno Reservoir, 48°36′05″N 109°56′40″W, el. 2,575 feet (785 m)
- Grass Reservoir, 48°18′59″N 110°04′54″W, el. 2,657 feet (810 m)
- Grassy Lake, 48°51′01″N 109°48′25″W, el. 2,749 feet (838 m)
- Grassy Lake, 48°44′42″N 109°35′33″W, el. 2,651 feet (808 m)
- Kiemle Reservoir, 48°24′36″N 110°00′45″W, el. 2,700 feet (820 m)
- Lohman Reservoir, 48°39′30″N 109°45′39″W, el. 2,808 feet (856 m)
- McKinnsey Reservoir, 48°47′38″N 110°29′32″W, el. 2,936 feet (895 m)
- McLean Reservoir, 48°51′49″N 109°46′59″W, el. 2,756 feet (840 m)
- Prescott Reservoir, 48°36′54″N 110°38′39″W, el. 3,212 feet (979 m)
- Sands Lake, 48°31′52″N 109°42′23″W, el. 2,628 feet (801 m)
- Schmidt Reservoir, 48°19′19″N 110°05′05″W, el. 2,674 feet (815 m)
- U N Reservoir, 48°53′53″N 109°55′26″W, el. 2,858 feet (871 m)

== See also ==
- List of lakes in Montana
