= Hulett (disambiguation) =

The Hulett was a design of automatic ore unloader.

Hulett may also refer to:

- Hulett (surname)
- Hulett, Wyoming, a town in Crook County, Wyoming, United States

== People with the given name ==
- Hulett C. Merritt (1872–1956), American businessman
- Hulett C. Smith (1918–2012), American politician
