= Laredo, Montana =

- Census-designated place
- Location within Montana Location within the United States
- Coordinates: 48°25′49″N 109°53′10″W
- Country: United States
- State: Montana
- County: Hill

Area
  - Total: 0.19 sq mi (0.48 km^{2})
  - Land: 0.19 sq mi (0.48 km^{2})
  - Water: 0 sq mi (0.00 km^{2})
- Elevation: 2,638 ft (804 m)

Population (2020)
  - Total: 37
  - Density: 197.6/sq mi (76.31/km^{2})
- Time zone: UTC-7 (Mountain (MST))
  - Summer (DST): UTC-6 (MDT)
- Area code: 406
- FIPS code: 30-42475
- GNIS feature ID: 2804299

Laredo is an unincorporated rural community in Hill County, Montana, United States. As of the 2020 census, Laredo had a population of 37. The elevation is 2,644 feet. Laredo is located at latitude 48.431 and longitude -109.883. It is located on U.S. Route 87, 13 miles south of Havre.

== Demographics ==
Historical population
Census	Pop.	Note	%±
2020	37		—
U.S. Decennial Census
