= Too Close for Comfort (disambiguation) =

Too Close for Comfort is an American television series.

Too Close for Comfort may also refer to:

- "Too Close for Comfort" (song), a 1956 song by Jerry Bock, George David Weiss, and Larry Holofcener
- Too Close for Comfort, album by Terry and the Pirates; see Buddy Cage and John Cipollina
- "Too Close for Comfort," song by McFly on the album Wonderland
- "Too Close for Comfort," episode of Survivor: Redemption Island

== See also ==
- Too Close for Comfort Site, an archaeological site
- Too Close for Comfort Tour, a concert tour of Darren Hayes
