= Gildford Colony, Montana =

- Census-designated place
- Location within Montana Location within the United States
- Coordinates: 48°48′09″N 110°17′04″W
- Country: United States
- State: Montana
- County: Hill

Area
  - Total: 0.77 sq mi (1.99 km^{2})
  - Land: 0.77 sq mi (1.99 km^{2})
  - Water: 0 sq mi (0.00 km^{2})
- Elevation: 2,792 ft (851 m)

Population (2020)
  - Total: 73
  - Density: 95.1/sq mi (36.73/km^{2})
- Time zone: UTC-7 (Mountain (MST))
  - Summer (DST): UTC-6 (MDT)
- ZIP Code: 59525 (Gildford)
- Area code: 406
- FIPS code: 30-30704
- GNIS feature ID: 2804297

Gildford Colony is a Hutterite community and census-designated place (CDP) in Hill County, Montana, United States. As of the 2020 census, Gildford Colony had a population of 73. It is in the northern part of the county, 16 miles (26 km) north of U.S. Route 2 at Gildford and 41 miles (66 km) northwest of Havre, the county seat.

Gildford Colony was first listed as a CDP prior to the 2020 census.

== Demographics ==
Historical population
Census	Pop.	Note	%±
2020	73		—
U.S. Decennial Census
