= Flint Rasmussen =

American rodeo clown

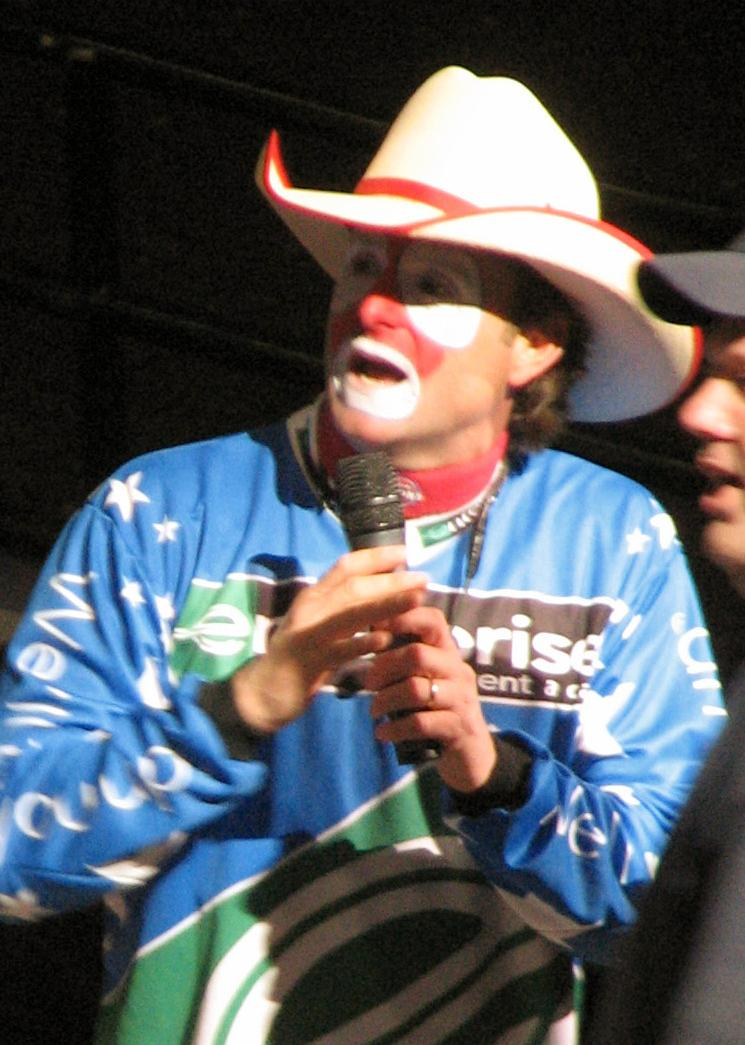
Rasmussen in 2007

Flint Rasmussen (born January 25, 1968) is an American professional rodeo barrelman. He is the most famous barrelman in the history of bull riding.

A former high school math and history teacher, Rasmussen signed an exclusive contract with the Professional Bull Riders and provided entertainment at their Premier Series events. Also long associated with the Professional Rodeo Cowboys Association, he earned the title of PRCA Clown of the Year for eight consecutive years and won the Coors Man in the Can honor seven times. Currently, Rasmussen works both PBR and PRCA events.

== Early life ==
On January 25, 1968, Stan and Tootsie Rasmussen had their youngest child, Flint, in Havre, Montana. Flint grew up in Choteau, Montana, where he started his career in sports. He was an All-State football player and track star for Choteau High School.

After high school, Rasmussen attended college at the University of Montana Western where he completed a double major in history and math as an honor student. As the public radio sports announcer for the UMW Bulldogs, he had his voice heard for the first time by an audience. To help with the expenses of college, Rasmussen worked as a barrel clown in western Montana. He made his first appearance as a rodeo clown in Superior, Montana, at the age of 19. Rasmussen had his first thoughts about being a rodeo clown when he told his father and brother that he could do better than the rodeo clowns at the time. "I just thought it needed a new energy, a young guy who could relate and get young people to get back to rodeo," he said.

After he completed college, Rasmussen returned to the town he was born in, Havre, and taught at Havre High School in addition to coaching football and track. While teaching at Havre High School, he was also the public address announcer at Northern Montana College (now MSU - Northern) home Lights and Skylights Basketball games. After two years of teaching and coaching, he grew restless and started his career as a barrelman.

== Family ==
Flint Rasmussen comes from a rodeo family with three other siblings. He has two brothers, Will and Pete, and a sister, Linda White. Flint's parents are Stan and Tootsie Rasmussen. Stan Rasmussen, Flint's father, was a rodeo announcer and his brother, Will, followed in his father's footsteps as a rodeo announcer. Will still is a top PRCA rodeo announcer. Flint met ex-wife, Katie Grasky, who was a barrel racer, while he was touring. Flint has two daughters, Shelby and Paige, who also barrel race.

== Achievements ==
"I think it's hard to come into this sport cold at 25 and try to learn it," Rasmussen said. But that did not stop him. He did his first National Finals Rodeo (NFR) in 1998. When he signed with the Professional Bull Riders (PBR) in 2005, the contract was exclusive and he now only worked for the PBR. Before signing with the PBR, he was the Professional Rodeo Cowboys Association (PRCA) Clown of the Year for eight consecutive years (1998-2005). Along with those honors, he was the Coors Man in the Can (the barrelman inside the barrel in the arena during the bull riding at the NFR) seven times (1998-1999, 2001-2005), He was the barrelman/arena entertainer for the PBR World Finals 27 times (1997-1998, 2000-2023, 2026).

== Health episode ==
On March 11, 2009, Rasmussen, at the age of 41, suffered a heart attack in his home in Choteau, Montana. After a couple of procedures, he was back in the arena in a short time. "The No. 1 thing that surprised me was the crowd reaction... and I've missed these people," Rasmussen said on returning to the arena after his heart attack. He got back to the arena with only a few differences: he had to wear a heart rate monitor and had to take a few breaks when his heart rate exceeded 140 bpm.

== Initial retirement and return ==
Rasmussen began to transition away from being an arena entertainer to become a color commentator for PBR during the inaugural PBR Team Series season in 2022; serving as a second sideline reporter with Allen Bestwick at some events. However, at other Team Series events, he returned to his role as arena entertainer.

In February 2023, Rasmussen announced that he was retiring as PBR arena entertainer at the end of the 2023 PBR World Finals in May and becoming a full-time commentator beginning at Cheyenne Frontier Days, the opening event of the PBR Team Series during the second half of the calendar year. He retired after working the 2023 PBR World Finals in May.

Rasmussen began his full-time career as a sideline reporter for the PBR Team Series in July of that year. Allen Bestwick did not return as a sideline reporter for the PBR Team Series, and Rasmussen's sideline reporting partner was now five-time PRCA World Champion steer wrestler Luke Branquinho, who himself had retired as a rodeo contestant in 2021.

In 2024, Rasmussen's role in the PBR Team Series was changed, as he went from a sideline reporter during the action to a post-show reporter. His new partner was fellow longtime PBR personality Matt West. From December 2024 to April 2025, Rasmussen was a host of PBR Now, a weekly web show which recapped the previous weekend's PBR Unleash the Beast Series (UTB) event and previewed the upcoming event. It streamed live every Thursday afternoon on the PBR's YouTube channel. His co-hosts were Matt West and PBR sideline reporter Kate Harrison.

In 2026, Rasmussen decided to come out of retirement and return to his role as PBR arena entertainer. He now works some UTB events, as well as some PRCA events.

Rasmussen now resides in Fort Worth, Texas.

== Honors ==
In 2010, Rasmussen made a special appearance as the Pendleton High School graduation speaker.

In 2011, he was inducted into the Pendleton Round-Up and Happy Canyon Hall of Fame.

In 2014, he was inducted into the St. Paul Rodeo Hall of Fame.

In 2019, he was inducted into the Ellensburg Rodeo Hall of Fame.

In 2024, he was inducted into the National Rodeo Hall of Fame.

In 2025, he was inducted into the Bull Riding Hall of Fame.

In 2026, he was awarded the PBR Jim Shoulders Lifetime Achievement Award.
