= KNMC =

Radio station at Montana State University-Northern in Havre, Montana

- Havre, Montana; United States
- Frequency: 90.1 MHz

Programming
- Format: College

Ownership
- Owner: Montana State University-Northern; (Northern Montana College)

History
- First air date: May 1978
- Former call signs: KNOG (1978–1985)
- Call sign meaning: Northern Montana College (old name of school)

Technical information
- Licensing authority: FCC
- Facility ID: 49580
- Class: A
- ERP: 380 watts
- HAAT: -34 meters (-111 feet)
- Transmitter coordinates: 48°32′31″N 109°41′17″W

Links
- Public license information: Public file; LMS
- Website: http://msun.edu/knmc/

KNMC (90.1 FM) is a radio station licensed to serve Havre, Montana. The station is owned by Montana State University-Northern and licensed to Northern Montana College. (MSU-Northern changed its name from Northern Montana College in 1994.) It airs a College radio format.

The station was assigned the KNMC call letters by the Federal Communications Commission on March 20, 1985.

== See also ==
- Campus radio
- List of college radio stations in the United States
