= East End Colony, Montana =

- Census-designated place
- Location within Montana Location within the United States
- Coordinates: 48°45′01″N 109°32′44″W
- Country: United States
- State: Montana
- County: Hill

Area
  - Total: 0.47 sq mi (1.23 km^{2})
  - Land: 0.47 sq mi (1.23 km^{2})
  - Water: 0 sq mi (0.00 km^{2})
- Elevation: 2,704 ft (824 m)

Population (2020)
  - Total: 8
  - Density: 16.9/sq mi (6.52/km^{2})
- Time zone: UTC-7 (Mountain (MST))
  - Summer (DST): UTC-6 (MDT)
- ZIP Code: 59501 (Havre)
- Area code: 406
- FIPS code: 30-22943
- GNIS feature ID: 2804296

East End Colony is a Hutterite community and census-designated place (CDP) in Hill County, Montana, United States. It is in the northeastern part of the county, 17 miles (27 km) northeast of Havre, the county seat.

East End Colony was first listed as a CDP prior to the 2020 census. As of the 2020 census, East End Colony had a population of 8.

== Demographics ==
Historical population
Census	Pop.	Note	%±
2020	8		—
U.S. Decennial Census
