= Hilldale Colony, Montana =

- Census-designated place
- Location within Montana Location within the United States
- Coordinates: 48°48′13″N 109°47′00″W
- Country: United States
- State: Montana
- County: Hill

Area
  - Total: 0.35 sq mi (0.91 km^{2})
  - Land: 0.35 sq mi (0.91 km^{2})
  - Water: 0 sq mi (0.00 km^{2})
- Elevation: 2,805 ft (855 m)

Population (2020)
  - Total: 130
  - Density: 368.9/sq mi (142.45/km^{2})
- Time zone: UTC-7 (Mountain (MST))
  - Summer (DST): UTC-6 (MDT)
- ZIP Code: 59501 (Havre)
- Area code: 406
- FIPS code: 30-36333
- GNIS feature ID: 2804298

Hilldale Colony is a Hutterite community and census-designated place (CDP) in Hill County, Montana, United States. It is in the northeastern part of the county, 22 miles (35 km) north of Havre, the county seat.

Hilldale Colony was first listed as a CDP prior to the 2020 census. As of the 2020 census, Hilldale Colony had a population of 130.

== Demographics ==
Historical population
Census	Pop.	Note	%±
2020	130		—
U.S. Decennial Census
