= KPQX =

- Havre, Montana; United States
- Broadcast area: Havre, Montana
- Frequency: 92.5 MHz (HD Radio)
- Branding: Your Kinda Country

Programming
- Format: FM/HD1: Country; HD2: Classic country HD3: Classic hits (KOJM simulcast)

Ownership
- Owner: New Media Broadcasters Inc.
- Sister stations: KOJM, KRYK

History
- First air date: March 8, 1975

Technical information
- Licensing authority: FCC
- Facility ID: 49261
- Class: C
- ERP: 100,000 watts
- HAAT: 545 meters (1789 feet)
- Transmitter coordinates: 48°10′55″N 109°41′01″W

Links
- Public license information: Public file; LMS
- Webcast: Listen Live
- Website: kpqx.com

KPQX (92.5 FM) is a radio station licensed to serve Havre, Montana. The station is owned by New Media Broadcasters Inc. It airs a country music format. The broadcast studios are located north of town, at 2210 31st Street North. This facility is shared with its sister stations. The transmitter site is south of Harve, near Baldy Mountain.

KPQX was the first FM radio station in Montana to broadcast pure digital HD Radio in the summer 2005. The HD2 subchannel broadcasts a classic country format.

The station was assigned the KPQX call letters by the Federal Communications Commission. Notable former on-air personalities include Rick Rydell.
