= Marc Mariani =

American football player (born 1987)

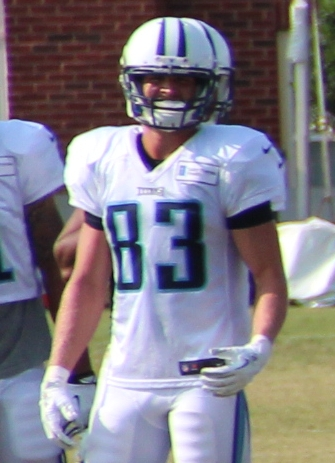
- Mariani with the Tennessee Titans in 2014

No. 83, 80, 87
- Positions: Wide receiver, return specialist

Personal information
- Born: May 2, 1987 (age 39); Havre, Montana, U.S.
- Listed height: 6 ft 1 in (1.85 m)
- Listed weight: 187 lb (85 kg)

Career information
- High school: Havre
- College: Montana
- NFL draft: 2010: 7th round, 222nd overall pick

Career history
- Tennessee Titans (2010–2013); Chicago Bears (2014–2015); Tennessee Titans (2016)

Awards and highlights
- Pro Bowl (2010); PFWA All-Rookie Team (2010)

Career NFL statistics
- Receptions: 27
- Receiving yards: 324
- Return yards: 5,041
- Return touchdowns: 3
- Stats at Pro Football Reference

Marc Steven Mariani (born May 2, 1987) is an American former professional football player who was a wide receiver and return specialist in the National Football League (NFL). He played college football for the Montana Grizzlies, and was selected by the Tennessee Titans in the seventh round of the 2010 NFL draft.

== Early life ==
Mariani attended Havre High School where he was awarded 10 letters: three each in football and basketball and four in tennis. He was named all-state at wide receiver. In his senior season he had 48 receptions for 1,237 yards and 16 touchdowns.

He served as a team captain as a senior in football. His 2004 football team was 12–0 and the state "A" champion. He participated in Montana's annual East-West Shrine Game.

== College career ==
Mariani, a walk-on at Montana in 2005 studying Business Marketing & Management, did not play football his first year. In 2006 Mariani played in all 14 games and had eight tackles on special teams. He did not have a reception as a receiver. In 2007 Mariani saw action in 11 games with three starts. His first touchdown came against Northern Colorado when he caught a 27-yard pass in the second quarter. Mariani finished the season with 15 catches for 231 yards and one touchdown. He also led the Big Sky and was 11th in the FCS in punt returns. As a junior in 2008 Mariani started all 16 games and 69 receptions for 1,308 yards with a career-best 15 touchdowns. His best game came against Southern Utah when he tied a school record with 4 touchdowns. He set a school record with 2,265 all-purpose yards, which is the fifth most in Big Sky Conference history. He led the Big Sky in punt returns, averaging 16.22 an attempt, which ranked him fourth in the nation. He was a first-team All-Big Sky picks at both wide receiver and a returner. He was named second-team All-American by the Sports Network. His best season came in 2009 when he caught 80 passes for 1,479 yards and 13 touchdowns. His 1,479 receiving yards set a single-season record at Montana. Mariani led the conference with seven 100-yard receiving games and in multiple touchdown games with four. He was a unanimous All-Big Sky pick at wide receiver, a second-team selection as a return specialist and was named a first-team All-American by the Associated Press. His best game came against South Dakota State when he gained 389 all-purpose yards, the second highest total in Big Sky single-game history; he recorded 12 receptions for 171 yards and two touchdowns, returned four kickoffs for 178 yards and 40 yards from six punt returns.

Mariani finished his college career as one of the most successful receivers in school history with records in career receiving yards (3,018), receiving touchdowns (29) and career all-purpose yards (5,441).

== Professional career ==
=== Tennessee Titans (first stint) ===
Mariani was selected by the Tennessee Titans in the seventh round of the 2010 NFL draft with the 222nd overall pick and later signed a four-year deal with the team. In week 4, he returned a kickoff 98 yards for a touchdown. In week 11, he returned a punt 87 yards for a touchdown against the Washington Redskins. Mariani was selected to the 2011 Pro Bowl as a return specialist for the American Football Conference (AFC). Mariani set two Pro Bowl records in the 2011 Pro Bowl: number of returns and total return yards for a game.

Mariani missed the entire 2012 season after he broke his leg on a first-quarter punt return in the third game of the preseason against the Arizona Cardinals. He was released by the Titans during final cuts on August 29, 2014.

=== Chicago Bears ===
On November 18, 2014, Mariani was signed by the Chicago Bears to a two-year contract. Mariani only played in six games during the 2014 season, returning 20 kickoffs for 510 yards.

On January 3, 2016, Mariani caught a career-high six receptions for a career-high 80 yards against the Detroit Lions. Mariani ended his 2015 season with a career-high 26.1 yards per return but with a career low 16 returns.

On March 12, 2016, Mariani was re-signed by the Chicago Bears to a one-year contract.

=== Tennessee Titans (second stint) ===
On September 5, 2016, Mariani was once again signed to the Titans after being released from the Bears over the previous weekend. Mariani finished the 2016 season with 795 total returning yards.

=== Career awards and highlights ===
- Pro Bowl selection (2010)
- PFWA All-AFC selection (2010)
- AFC Kickoff Return yards leader (2010)
- 2× AFC Special Teams Player of the Week (Week 11, 2010, Week 10, 2011)
- Sporting News All-Rookie Team (2010)

== Records ==
=== Oilers/Titans franchise records ===
- Most kick return yards in a single season: 1,530 (2010)
- Most kickoff returns: 61 (2010)

=== Pro Bowl records ===
- Most kickoff return yards in a single game: 326 (2011)
- Most returns in a single game: 9 (2011)

== Post-playing career ==
After retiring from football, Mariani now works as a real estate agent for Village Real Estate, a Nashville real estate firm. On August 1, 2018, he was announced as an assistant coach for the Lipscomb Academy Mustangs football team, working with wide receivers and returners.
