= Beaver Creek, Montana =

- Census-designated place
- Location of Beaver Creek, Montana
- Coordinates: 48°32′37″N 109°48′25″W
- Country: United States
- State: Montana
- County: Hill

Area
  - Total: 4.59 sq mi (11.88 km^{2})
  - Land: 4.59 sq mi (11.88 km^{2})
  - Water: 0 sq mi (0.00 km^{2})
- Elevation: 2,576 ft (785 m)

Population (2020)
  - Total: 311
  - Density: 67.8/sq mi (26.17/km^{2})
- Time zone: UTC-7 (Mountain (MST))
  - Summer (DST): UTC-6 (MDT)
- Area code: 406
- FIPS code: 30-04575
- GNIS feature ID: 2407818

Beaver Creek is a census-designated place (CDP) in Hill County, Montana, United States. As of the 2020 census, Beaver Creek had a population of 311.

== Geography ==
Beaver Creek is located in eastern Hill County and is bordered to the east by Herron. U.S. Route 2 runs through the northern part of the CDP, leading east 5 miles (8 km) to Havre, the county seat, and west 97 miles (156 km) to Shelby.

According to the United States Census Bureau, the Beaver Creek CDP has a total area of 4.6 square miles (11.9 km^{2}), all land.

== Demographics ==
Historical population
Census	Pop.	Note	%±
2020	311		—
U.S. Decennial Census

As of the census of 2000, there were 291 people, 109 households, and 89 families residing in the CDP. The population density was 63.6 inhabitants per square mile (24.6/km^{2}). There were 113 housing units at an average density of 24.7 per square mile (9.5/km^{2}). The racial makeup of the CDP was 98.28% White, 0.34% Native American, and 1.37% from two or more races. Hispanic or Latino of any race were 0.34% of the population.

There were 109 households, out of which 37.6% had children under the age of 18 living with them, 73.4% were married couples living together, 4.6% had a female householder with no husband present, and 18.3% were non-families. 16.5% of all households were made up of individuals, and 5.5% had someone living alone who was 65 years of age or older. The average household size was 2.67 and the average family size was 3.01.

In the CDP, the population was spread out, with 25.4% under the age of 18, 6.2% from 18 to 24, 30.6% from 25 to 44, 27.1% from 45 to 64, and 10.7% who were 65 years of age or older. The median age was 40 years. For every 100 females, there were 103.5 males. For every 100 females age 18 and over, there were 100.9 males.

The median income for a household in the CDP was $43,571, and the median income for a family was $44,205. Males had a median income of $34,261 versus $25,000 for females. The per capita income for the CDP was $19,566. None of the population or families were below the poverty line.
