= Havre High School =

Public school in Montana, United States

Coordinates: 48.53561°N 109.672296°W

Location
- 900 18th Street; Havre, (Hill County), Montana 59501; United States

Information
- Type: Public high school
- Principal: Dustin Kraske
- Staff: 34.14 (FTE)
- Enrollment: 515 (2023-2024)
- Student to teacher ratio: 15.08
- Colors: Royal blue and white
- Nickname: Blue Ponies

Havre High School is a high school (grades 9–12) in the small town of Havre, Hill County, Montana. It is within the Havre Public Schools. The school colors are blue and white and the mascot is the Blue Ponies.

== Notable alumni ==
- Jacob Bachmeier, state representative
- Ryan Divish, Seattle Times baseball writer
- Marc Mariani, NFL football player
- Jill McLain, beauty queen
- Flint Rasmussen, rodeo clown

== See also ==
- List of high schools in Montana
