= Havre North, Montana =

- Census-designated place
- Location of Havre North, Montana
- Coordinates: 48°33′56″N 109°38′48″W
- Country: United States
- State: Montana
- County: Hill

Area
  - Total: 3.35 sq mi (8.68 km^{2})
  - Land: 3.35 sq mi (8.68 km^{2})
  - Water: 0 sq mi (0.00 km^{2})
- Elevation: 2,569 ft (783 m)

Population (2020)
  - Total: 726
  - Density: 216.8/sq mi (83.69/km^{2})
- Time zone: UTC-7 (Mountain (MST))
  - Summer (DST): UTC-6 (MDT)
- Area code: 406
- FIPS code: 30-35125
- GNIS feature ID: 2408357

Havre North is a census-designated place (CDP) in Hill County, Montana, United States. As of the 2020 census, Havre North had a population of 726.

== Geography ==
Havre North is located along the north side of the city of Havre, the Hill County seat. The Milk River, a tributary of the Missouri River, flows through the CDP from west to east.

According to the United States Census Bureau, the CDP has a total area of 3.4 square miles (8.8 km^{2}), all land.

== Demographics ==
Historical population
Census	Pop.	Note	%±
2020	726		—
U.S. Decennial Census

As of the census of 2000, there were 973 people, 422 households, and 259 families residing in the CDP. The population density was 289.7 inhabitants per square mile (111.9/km^{2}). There were 474 housing units at an average density of 141.1 per square mile (54.5/km^{2}). The racial makeup of the CDP was 88.18% White, 0.10% African American, 8.53% Native American, 0.10% Asian, 0.41% from other races, and 2.67% from two or more races. Hispanic or Latino of any race were 0.72% of the population.

There were 422 households, out of which 28.7% had children under the age of 18 living with them, 42.4% were married couples living together, 15.4% had a female householder with no husband present, and 38.6% were non-families. 32.0% of all households were made up of individuals, and 10.9% had someone living alone who was 65 years of age or older. The average household size was 2.30 and the average family size was 2.89.

In the CDP, the population was spread out, with 25.5% under the age of 18, 9.0% from 18 to 24, 28.6% from 25 to 44, 25.1% from 45 to 64, and 11.8% who were 65 years of age or older. The median age was 37 years. For every 100 females, there were 95.8 males. For every 100 females age 18 and over, there were 95.4 males.

The median income for a household in the CDP was $20,888, and the median income for a family was $25,625. Males had a median income of $21,250 versus $17,277 for females. The per capita income for the CDP was $10,921. About 18.8% of families and 23.3% of the population were below the poverty line, including 24.6% of those under age 18 and 2.2% of those age 65 or over.
