= KOJM =

- Havre, Montana; United States
- Frequency: 610 kHz (HD Radio)
- Branding: The Rock

Programming
- Format: Classic hits

Ownership
- Owner: New Media Broadcasters, Inc.
- Sister stations: KPQX, KRYK

History
- First air date: 1983

Technical information
- Licensing authority: FCC
- Facility ID: 49262
- Class: B
- Power: 1,000 watts
- Transmitter coordinates: 48°34′48″N 109°38′54″W
- Translator: 98.3 K252FZ (Havre)
- Repeater: 92.5-3 KPQX-HD3

Links
- Public license information: Public file; LMS
- Webcast: Listen Live
- Website: www.kojm.com

KOJM (610 AM) is a radio station licensed to serve Havre, Montana. The station is owned by New Media Broadcasters, Inc. It airs a classic hits music format. The broadcast studios are located north of town, at 2210 31st Street North. This facility is shared with its sister stations. The transmitter and two towers are also at this location.

KOJM was the first AM radio station in Montana to broadcast with HD Radio in the summer 2004.

Prior to its classic hits format, KOJM was formerly a Top-40 station with an affiliate of American Top 40 with Casey Kasem since March 9, 1985.

The station was assigned the KOJM call letters by the Federal Communications Commission.
