= Saddle Butte, Montana =

- Census-designated place
- Location of Saddle Butte, Montana
- Coordinates: 48°31′24″N 109°38′42″W
- Country: United States
- State: Montana
- County: Hill

Area
  - Total: 2.51 sq mi (6.50 km^{2})
  - Land: 2.51 sq mi (6.50 km^{2})
  - Water: 0 sq mi (0.00 km^{2})
- Elevation: 2,720 ft (830 m)

Population (2020)
  - Total: 151
  - Density: 60.2/sq mi (23.24/km^{2})
- Time zone: UTC-7 (Mountain (MST))
  - Summer (DST): UTC-6 (MDT)
- Area code: 406
- FIPS code: 30-65065
- GNIS feature ID: 2409226

Saddle Butte is a census-designated place (CDP) in Hill County, Montana, United States. As of the 2020 census, Saddle Butte had a population of 151.

== Geography ==
Saddle Butte is located in eastern Hill County along the southeast border of Havre, the county seat. The community is named for Saddle Butte, a 3,143-foot (958 m) peak in the eastern part of the CDP. The center of the Saddle Butte community is 3.5 miles (5.6 km) southeast of the center of Havre via Clear Creek Road and Bullhook Road.

According to the United States Census Bureau, the CDP has a total area of 2.7 square miles (7.1 km^{2}), all land.

== Demographics ==
Historical population
Census	Pop.	Note	%±
2020	151		—
U.S. Decennial Census

As of the census of 2000, there were 138 people, 43 households, and 39 families residing in the CDP. The population density was 53.3 inhabitants per square mile (20.6/km^{2}). There were 43 housing units at an average density of 16.6/sq mi (6.4/km^{2}). The racial makeup of the CDP was 97.10% White, 0.72% Native American, 0.72% Asian, 0.72% from other races, and 0.72% from two or more races. Hispanic or Latino of any race were 5.07% of the population.

There were 43 households, out of which 53.5% had children under the age of 18 living with them, 86.0% were married couples living together, 4.7% had a female householder with no husband present, and 7.0% were non-families. 4.7% of all households were made up of individuals, and none had someone living alone who was 65 years of age or older. The average household size was 3.21 and the average family size was 3.33.

In the CDP, the population was spread out, with 30.4% under the age of 18, 8.0% from 18 to 24, 29.7% from 25 to 44, 31.2% from 45 to 64, and 0.7% who were 65 years of age or older. The median age was 38 years. For every 100 females, there were 89.0 males. For every 100 females age 18 and over, there were 100.0 males.

The median income for a household in the CDP was $62,857, and the median income for a family was $62,857. Males had a median income of $47,500 versus $13,750 for females. The per capita income for the CDP was $23,768. None of the population and none of the families were below the poverty line.
