= George A. Hulett =

George Augustus Hulett (July 15, 1867 – September 6, 1955) was an American physical chemist, notable as scientific liaison to the British government during World War I on the subject of poison gasses in warfare. He was a member of the National Academy of Sciences and the American Philosophical Society.

Hulett was the son of Frank Hulett, a rancher (and son of a successful western fur trader), and Lois Holmes, a recently emigrated Englishwoman. His early years were spent on the family's horse and cattle ranch in then-rural Dupage County, Illinois, where he became known as expert in repairing farm machinery. When George was in high school, a teacher praised his mathematical ability, with the result that his parents shipped him off to live with an uncle in Cleveland to attend Cleveland High School and then Oberlin Preparatory School. He entered Oberlin College in 1888. In 1890 he transferred to Princeton, from where he graduated in 1892 with a B.A.

Hulett returned to Oberlin as an assistant in chemistry for four years, then moved to Leipzig, Germany to study under Wilhelm Ostwald for a Ph.D. in the new field of physical chemistry. His work there was on phase transitions in liquid crystals. He was known for hard work, not only in chemistry but in the mastery of Germany's national card game skat, as well as chess, billiards, and golf. Obtaining his degree in 1899, he took a position at the University of Michigan in Ann Arbor as the university's first instructor in physical chemistry. His vocation (chemistry) and avocation (golf) both there flourished. He was early to recognize and study the existence of fluids under negative pressure. Known as a vigorous "man's man", he lived the bachelor's life for several years with a rooming group of twelve men before marrying Dency Minerva Pierpont Barker in 1904. The marriage lasted more than 50 years, until his death.

A 1905 visit to Ann Arbor by Woodrow Wilson, then president of Princeton University, by chance changed Hulett's future. Wilson recruited him to Princeton as its first physical chemist, by 1909 its first full professor of physical chemistry. At Princeton, Hulett developed a research program on standard potentiometric cells as voltage reference standards. Wilson encouraged Hulett's connections as a consultant to various government agencies, especially the Bureau of Standards and Bureau of Mines. On leave from Princeton, Hulett served as director of the latter agency in 1912-1913.

The detection and mitigation of poison gasses was a natural part of the Bureau's work. Immediately after the United States entered World War I, a War Gas Investigation was established (later to be merged with the Army's Chemical Warfare Service). Within days, Hulett sailed for Britain as lead chemist on a team of six American scientists led by physicist Joseph Ames, tasked to report back on the technical needs of the British and French allies. Little more than two months later, when General Pershing and his Allied Expeditionary Force arrived in France, Hulett, turning down a commission in the Army, became a civilian consulting chemist at A.E.F. headquarters. Later in the war he returned to the U.S. to work on chemical absorbents for gas masks.

In 1920, when he was 53, an accidental fall and severe concussion left Hulett partly paralyzed and thereafter unable to do experimental work with his own hands. Working through students, he continued to publish research results on voltage reference cells, as well as serving on various national committees and as a journal editor, until taking emeritus status in 1935. But sadly he referred to his years after 1920 as, "just marking time." Cared for by his wife, he lived a further twenty years, increasingly crippled by arthritis until his death in 1955.
