= Too Close for Comfort Site =

- Too Close for Comfort Site (24HL101)
- U.S. National Register of Historic Places
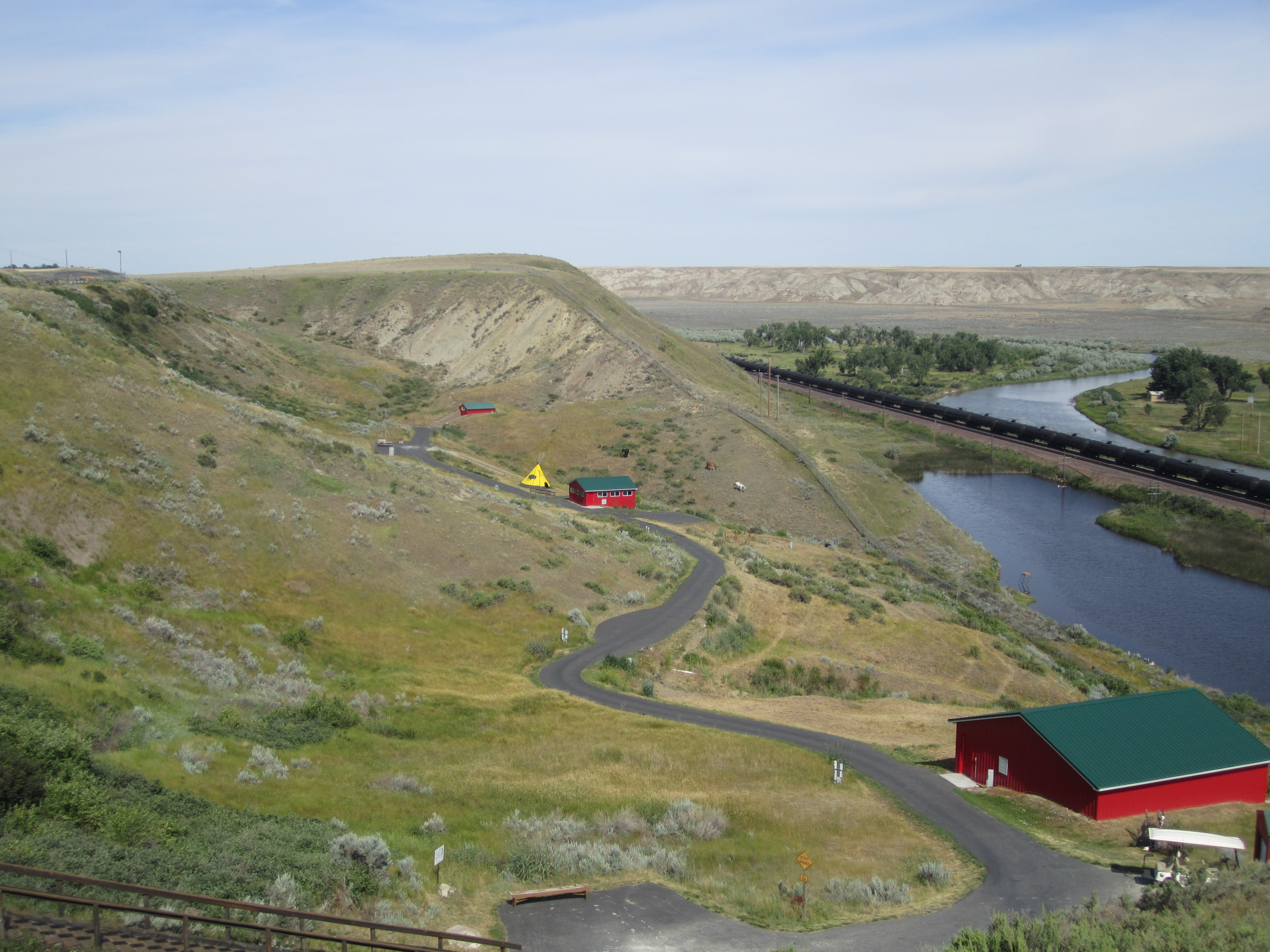
- The Wahkpa Chu'gun Buffalo Jump. The buildings preserve butchering sites and thousands of buffalo bones. The Milk River is in the background.

- Location within Montana Location within the United States
- Location: Behind the Wahkpa Chu'gn Meat Market on U.S. Route 2
- Nearest city: Havre, Montana
- Coordinates: 48°33′40″N 109°42′55″W
- Area: 14.5 acres (5.9 ha)
- NRHP reference No.: 74001098
- Added to NRHP: December 30, 1974

The Too Close for Comfort Site is an archaeological site located in Havre, Montana, United States. The area was used as a buffalo jump. The site, also known as Wahkpa Chu'gn has yielded artifacts from three Native American groups. Between 2000–1500 years ago, the site was inhabited by the Besent peoples, followed about 200–300 years later by the Avonlea peoples for a brief period of time, and lastly by the Saddle Butte peoples who were using the site until about 600 years ago.

Wahkpa Chu'gn was discovered in 1962 by John Brumley, followed by further excavations in the 1960s and 1970s by the Montana State Archaeological Society and the Milk River Archaeological Society. John Brumley took over the excavations in the late 1970s, and in 1992 he and his wife began managing the site as an extremely experiential "non-sterile" archaeological site.

The site is open to the public, operated by the H. Earl Clack Memorial Museum. It was added to the National Register of Historic Places on December 12, 1974.
