= William Hulett =

William Hulett was born in Havre, Montana on May 21, 1982. He moved to Las Vegas, Nevada in late 2000. Since moving to Las Vegas he has performed numerous shows on the Las Vegas Strip and been in several national commercials. He was a winner of Fear Factor 10/11/04. He starred in a reality show produced by Ryan Seacrest called Paradise City in 2006. He performed in Cirque du Soleil's Zumanity from 2007 until March 14, 2020.
