= Sage Lake =

- Interactive map of Sage Lake
- Location: Ogemaw County, Michigan
- Coordinates: 44.351°N 83.943°W
- Type: Lake
- Primary outflows: Au Gres River
- Average depth: 17.9 ft (5.5 m)
- Max. depth: 78.6 ft (24.0 m)
- Islands: 3

Sage Lake is a 785 acres (318 ha) glacial lake located roughly 16 miles (26 km) of West Branch in Ogemaw County, Michigan. It is as an "all-sports" lake known for its three islands, fishing, and recreational history. The lake is considered to be the headwaters of the Au Gres River.

== History ==
The lake was formed during the Wisconsin Glaciation with the advance and retreat of the Laurentide Ice Sheet. The lake is named after lumber speculator Henry W. Sage, who owned roughly 50,000 acres (20,000 ha) of Ogemaw County timbers, including the area around the lake. The lake, along with much of the county, lost most of its lumber by 1900. The lake began to be developed in the early 1920s and a stop log dam was installed on the northwest shore for water control in 1951. The lake is currently developed with over fifty family-sized homes along the coastline and on its islands.

The lake provides habitat to a number of fish species, including Bass, Pike, Panfish, Bullheads, and Carp.
