= KRYK =

- Chinook, Montana; United States
- Broadcast area: Chinook, Montana
- Frequency: 101.3 MHz
- Branding: Sunny 101

Programming
- Format: Hot adult contemporary
- Affiliations: Westwood One

Ownership
- Owner: New Media Broadcasters, Inc.
- Sister stations: KOJM, KPQX

History
- First air date: November 19, 1983

Technical information
- Licensing authority: FCC
- Facility ID: 56336
- Class: C1
- ERP: 100,000 watts
- HAAT: 207 meters (680 feet)
- Transmitter coordinates: 48°23′29″N 109°17′50″W

Links
- Public license information: Public file; LMS
- Webcast: Listen Live
- Website: kryk.com

KRYK (101.3 FM, "Sunny 101") is a radio station licensed to serve Chinook, Montana. The station is owned by New Media Broadcasters, Inc. It airs a hot adult contemporary music format. The broadcast studios are located north of Havre, at 2210 31st Street North. This facility is shared with its sister stations. The transmitter site is 13.7 miles SSW from Chinook.

Their HD2 channel carries a Current Hit Radio format.

The station was assigned the KRYK call letters by the Federal Communications Commission on July 25, 1983.
