= West Havre, Montana =

- Census-designated place
- Location of West Havre, Montana
- Coordinates: 48°32′27″N 109°44′40″W
- Country: United States
- State: Montana
- County: Hill

Area
  - Total: 1.89 sq mi (4.90 km^{2})
  - Land: 1.89 sq mi (4.90 km^{2})
  - Water: 0 sq mi (0.00 km^{2})
- Elevation: 2,608 ft (795 m)

Population (2020)
  - Total: 290
  - Density: 153.3/sq mi (59.19/km^{2})
- Time zone: UTC-7 (Mountain (MST))
  - Summer (DST): UTC-6 (MDT)
- Area code: 406
- FIPS code: 30-79098
- GNIS feature ID: 2409551

West Havre is a census-designated place (CDP) in Hill County, Montana, United States. As of the 2020 census, West Havre had a population of 290.

== Geography ==
West Havre is located in eastern Hill County and is bordered to the east by the city of Havre, and to the west by unincorporated Herron. U.S. Route 2 forms the northern edge of the West Havre CDP, leading east into Havre and west 100 miles (161 km) to Shelby. U.S. Route 87 has its northern terminus at US 2 at the northwest corner of West Havre, and leads southwest 110 miles (180 km) to Great Falls.

According to the United States Census Bureau, the West Havre CDP has a total area of 1.9 square miles (4.9 km^{2}), all land.

== Demographics ==
Historical population
Census	Pop.	Note	%±
2020	290		—
U.S. Decennial Census

As of the census of 2000, there were 284 people, 100 households, and 79 families residing in the CDP. The population density was 151.4 inhabitants per square mile (58.5/km^{2}). There were 103 housing units at an average density of 54.9 per square mile (21.2/km^{2}). The racial makeup of the CDP was 92.25% White, 1.41% Native American, 1.41% Asian, and 4.93% from two or more races.

There were 100 households, out of which 44.0% had children under the age of 18 living with them, 72.0% were married couples living together, 3.0% had a female householder with no husband present, and 21.0% were non-families. 17.0% of all households were made up of individuals, and 5.0% had someone living alone who was 65 years of age or older. The average household size was 2.84 and the average family size was 3.24.

In the CDP, the population was spread out, with 31.7% under the age of 18, 6.3% from 18 to 24, 25.0% from 25 to 44, 31.0% from 45 to 64, and 6.0% who were 65 years of age or older. The median age was 36 years. For every 100 females, there were 95.9 males. For every 100 females age 18 and over, there were 104.2 males.

The median income for a household in the CDP was $56,375, and the median income for a family was $57,125. Males had a median income of $48,000 versus $19,519 for females. The per capita income for the CDP was $24,823. None of the families and 2.0% of the population were living below the poverty line.
