= Hill County, Montana =

County in Montana, United States

- County
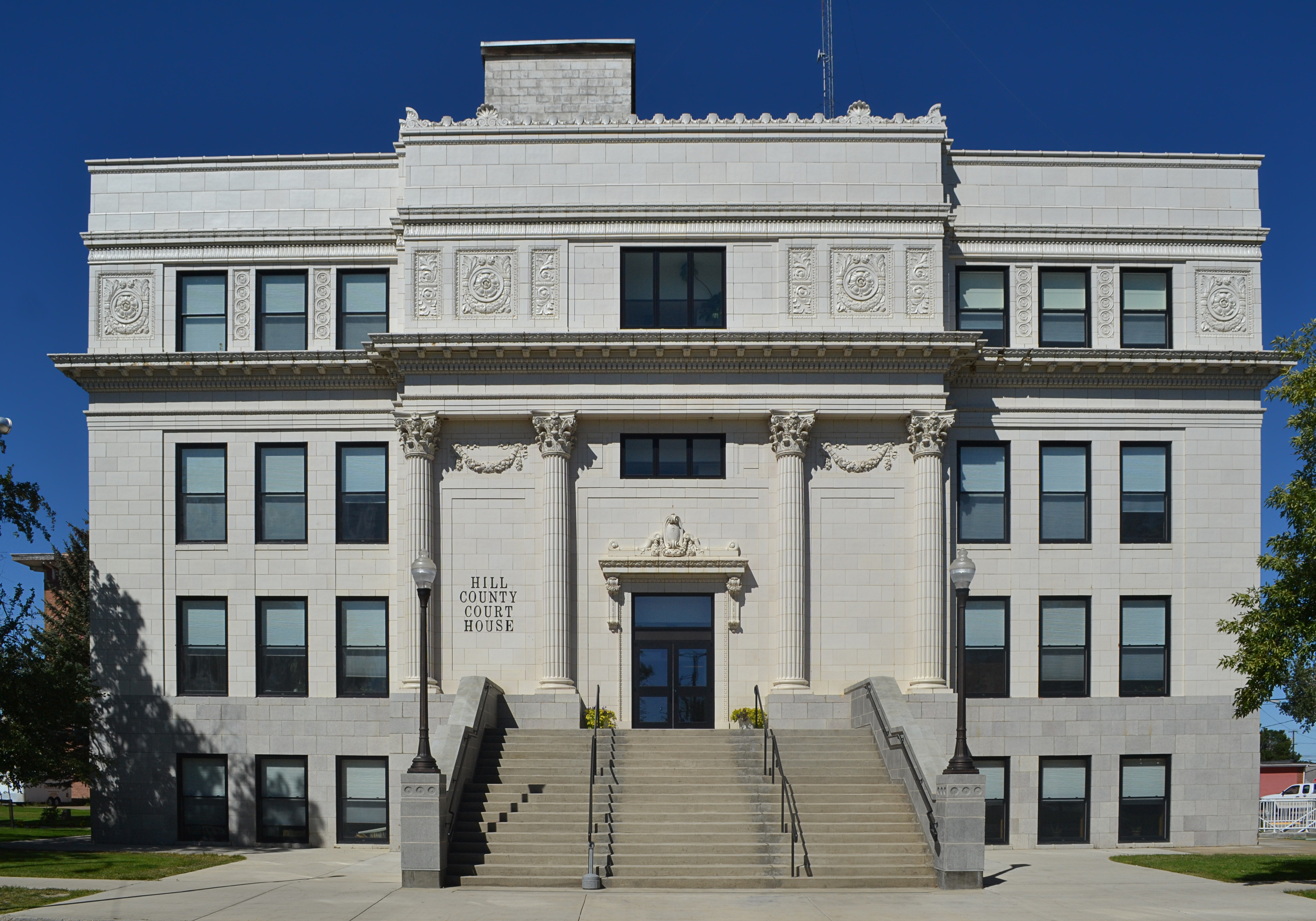
- Hill County Courthouse in Havre

- Location within the U.S. state of Montana
- Coordinates: 48°38′N 110°07′W
- Country: United States
- State: Montana
- Founded: February 28, 1912
- Named for: James J. Hill
- Seat: Havre
- Largest city: Havre

Area
  - Total: 2,916 sq mi (7,550 km^{2})
  - Land: 2,899 sq mi (7,510 km^{2})
  - Water: 17 sq mi (44 km^{2}) 0.6%

Population (2020)
  - Total: 16,309
  - Estimate (2025): 16,167 ▼
  - Density: 5.6/sq mi (2.2/km^{2})
- Time zone: UTC−7 (Mountain)
  - Summer (DST): UTC−6 (MDT)
- Congressional district: 2nd
- Website: hillcounty.us
- Montana county number 12

Hill County is a county located in the U.S. state of Montana. As of the 2020 census, the population was 16,309. Its county seat is Havre. It lies along the United States border with Canada, abutting Alberta and Saskatchewan.

Part of its territory is within the Rocky Boy Indian Reservation, which is held by the federally recognized Chippewa-Cree Tribe.

== History ==
The first European-American settlement in the future county area was Fort Assinniboine, garrisoned by the United States Army in 1879. Fifteen of the original 104 structures from the fort are still standing. A portion of the fort was ceded for use as the Indian reservation, which was established in 1916.

The county, created on February 28, 1912, is named after James J. Hill, president of the Great Northern Railway Company, which built the rail line across Montana as part of the Transcontinental Railroad to the Pacific coast.

== Geography ==
According to the United States Census Bureau, the county has a total area of 2,916 square miles (7,550 km^{2}), of which 2,899 square miles (7,510 km^{2}) is land and 17 square miles (44 km^{2}) (0.6%) is water.

Hill County is on the "Hi-Line" in north-central Montana. It borders Blaine County to the east, Liberty County to the west, and Canada to the north. Hill County contains Beaver Creek Park, the nation's largest county park.

=== Adjacent counties and rural municipalities ===
- Liberty County - west
- Chouteau County - south
- Blaine County - east
- County of Forty Mile No. 8, Alberta - northwest
- Cypress County, Alberta - north
- Rural Municipality of Reno No. 51, Saskatchewan - northeast

=== Major highways ===
- U.S. Route 2
- U.S. Route 87

=== National protected areas ===
- Creedman Coulee National Wildlife Refuge
- Lake Thibadeau National Wildlife Refuge

== Demographics ==
Historical population
| Census | Pop. | Note | %± |
|---|---|---|---|
| 1920 | 13,958 | | — |
| 1930 | 13,775 | | −1.3% |
| 1940 | 13,304 | | −3.4% |
| 1950 | 14,285 | | 7.4% |
| 1960 | 18,653 | | 30.6% |
| 1970 | 17,358 | | −6.9% |
| 1980 | 17,985 | | 3.6% |
| 1990 | 17,654 | | −1.8% |
| 2000 | 16,673 | | −5.6% |
| 2010 | 16,096 | | −3.5% |
| 2020 | 16,309 | | 1.3% |
| 2025 (est.) | 16,167 | ▼ | −0.9% |
U.S. Decennial Census:

=== 2020 census ===
As of the 2020 census, the county had a population of 16,309. Of the residents, 26.4% were under the age of 18 and 16.2% were 65 years of age or older; the median age was 35.3 years. For every 100 females there were 98.6 males, and for every 100 females age 18 and over there were 97.8 males. 60.2% of residents lived in urban areas and 39.8% lived in rural areas.

The racial makeup of the county was 68.5% White, 0.3% Black or African American, 23.1% American Indian and Alaska Native, 0.5% Asian, 0.6% from some other race, and 7.0% from two or more races. Hispanic or Latino residents of any race comprised 3.1% of the population.

There were 6,176 households in the county, of which 32.4% had children under the age of 18 living with them and 25.9% had a female householder with no spouse or partner present. About 30.6% of all households were made up of individuals and 12.1% had someone living alone who was 65 years of age or older.

There were 7,223 housing units, of which 14.5% were vacant. Among occupied housing units, 64.9% were owner-occupied and 35.1% were renter-occupied. The homeowner vacancy rate was 2.3% and the rental vacancy rate was 13.7%.

=== 2010 census ===
As of the 2010 census, there were 16,096 people, 6,275 households, and 4,020 families living in the county. The population density was 5.6 inhabitants per square mile (2.2/km^{2}). There were 7,250 housing units at an average density of 2.5 per square mile (0.97/km^{2}). The racial makeup of the county was 73.9% white, 21.7% American Indian, 0.4% Asian, 0.3% black or African American, 0.3% from other races, and 3.3% from two or more races. Those of Hispanic or Latino origin made up 2.3% of the population. In terms of ancestry, 28.9% were German, 18.5% were Norwegian, 12.7% were Irish, 9.2% were English, and 3.0% were American.

Of the 6,275 households, 32.5% had children under the age of 18 living with them, 46.3% were married couples living together, 11.9% had a female householder with no husband present, 35.9% were non-families, and 29.8% of all households were made up of individuals. The average household size was 2.47 and the average family size was 3.10. The median age was 35.1 years.

The median income for a household in the county was $43,606 and the median income for a family was $55,963. Males had a median income of $44,286 versus $28,908 for females. The per capita income for the county was $21,420. About 12.4% of families and 17.9% of the population were below the poverty line, including 24.0% of those under age 18 and 9.6% of those age 65 or over.

== Politics ==
In presidential elections, Hill County is a swing county. Since 1952, it has voted for the Democratic nominee nine times and the Republican nominee nine times and the nationwide winner from 1992 to 2016. The rural parts of the county vote heavily Republican, and the city of Havre is also majority Republican. However, the Rocky Boy's Reservation in the southeastern part of the county is a Democratic stronghold, having voted by as much as 84% Democratic in 2024 (down from 93% in 2020). This leads the county to be less Republican overall than multiple neighboring counties. The county swung heavily to support Barack Obama in 2008 and ever since then the county has seen a steady Republican trend. Donald Trump, who swung the county back into the Republican column in 2016, showed the strongest performance by any Republican candidate in the county's history in 2024 when he received over 56% of the vote.

Current Hill County Commissioners are Jake Strissel, Chair, Sheri Williams, Vice-Chair, and William "Bill" Lanier

United States presidential election results for Hill County, Montana
| Year | Republican | | Democratic | | Third party(ies) | |
| Year | No. | % | No. | % | No. | % |
|---|---|---|---|---|---|---|
| 1912 | 536 | 26.43% | 624 | 30.77% | 868 | 42.80% |
| 1916 | 1,709 | 31.73% | 3,241 | 60.17% | 436 | 8.10% |
| 1920 | 2,220 | 55.44% | 1,388 | 34.67% | 396 | 9.89% |
| 1924 | 1,110 | 30.60% | 602 | 16.59% | 1,916 | 52.81% |
| 1928 | 2,336 | 53.37% | 2,022 | 46.20% | 19 | 0.43% |
| 1932 | 1,589 | 31.44% | 3,257 | 64.44% | 208 | 4.12% |
| 1936 | 1,014 | 18.37% | 4,328 | 78.41% | 178 | 3.22% |
| 1940 | 1,842 | 32.79% | 3,700 | 65.87% | 75 | 1.34% |
| 1944 | 1,646 | 35.25% | 2,986 | 63.95% | 37 | 0.79% |
| 1948 | 1,645 | 31.75% | 3,321 | 64.10% | 215 | 4.15% |
| 1952 | 3,474 | 55.44% | 2,748 | 43.86% | 44 | 0.70% |
| 1956 | 3,415 | 53.24% | 2,999 | 46.76% | 0 | 0.00% |
| 1960 | 3,163 | 45.73% | 3,741 | 54.09% | 12 | 0.17% |
| 1964 | 2,101 | 31.81% | 4,491 | 68.00% | 12 | 0.18% |
| 1968 | 2,970 | 44.53% | 3,386 | 50.77% | 313 | 4.69% |
| 1972 | 3,759 | 53.06% | 3,061 | 43.20% | 265 | 3.74% |
| 1976 | 3,274 | 45.10% | 3,878 | 53.42% | 108 | 1.49% |
| 1980 | 4,448 | 54.99% | 2,875 | 35.54% | 766 | 9.47% |
| 1984 | 4,635 | 55.24% | 3,657 | 43.59% | 98 | 1.17% |
| 1988 | 3,467 | 44.50% | 4,219 | 54.15% | 105 | 1.35% |
| 1992 | 2,408 | 29.79% | 3,618 | 44.77% | 2,056 | 25.44% |
| 1996 | 2,601 | 36.58% | 3,517 | 49.46% | 993 | 13.96% |
| 2000 | 3,392 | 51.72% | 2,760 | 42.09% | 406 | 6.19% |
| 2004 | 3,505 | 52.65% | 2,997 | 45.02% | 155 | 2.33% |
| 2008 | 2,787 | 42.07% | 3,596 | 54.28% | 242 | 3.65% |
| 2012 | 3,164 | 46.36% | 3,403 | 49.86% | 258 | 3.78% |
| 2016 | 3,478 | 53.96% | 2,371 | 36.79% | 596 | 9.25% |
| 2020 | 3,957 | 55.10% | 2,981 | 41.51% | 244 | 3.40% |
| 2024 | 3,871 | 56.89% | 2,634 | 38.71% | 299 | 4.39% |

== Communities ==
=== City ===
- Havre (county seat)

=== Town ===
- Hingham

=== Census-designated places ===
- Azure
- Beaver Creek
- Box Elder
- East End Colony
- Gildford
- Gildford Colony
- Havre North
- Herron
- Hilldale Colony
- Inverness
- Kremlin
- Laredo
- Parker School
- Rocky Boy West
- Rocky Boy's Agency
- Rudyard
- Saddle Butte
- St. Pierre
- Sangrey
- West Havre

=== Unincorporated communities ===
- Agency
- Goldstone
- Simpson

== See also ==
- List of lakes in Hill County, Montana
- List of mountains in Hill County, Montana
- National Register of Historic Places listings in Hill County MT
