= Havre, Montana =

City in Montana, United States

- City
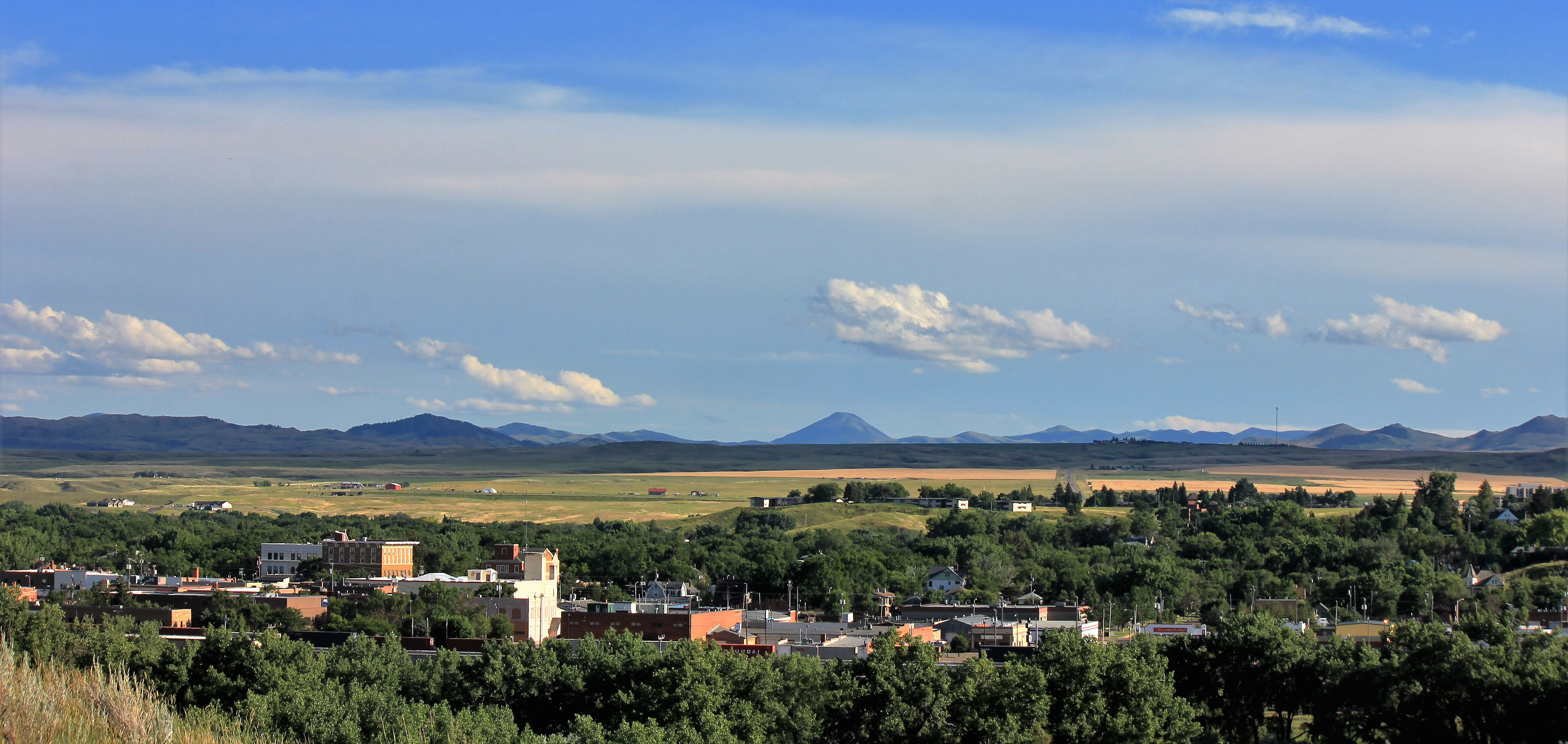
- View of Havre looking south to the Bears Paw Mountains
- Nickname: Heart of the Hi-Line
- Location of Havre, Montana

- Location in the United States
- Coordinates: 48°32′34″N 109°40′49″W
- Country: United States
- State: Montana
- County: Hill

Government
  - Mayor: Wade Bitz

Area
  - Total: 3.71 sq mi (9.61 km^{2})
  - Land: 3.71 sq mi (9.61 km^{2})
  - Water: 0 sq mi (0.00 km^{2})
- Elevation: 2,562 ft (781 m)

Population (2020)
  - Total: 9,362
  - Density: 2,524.1/sq mi (974.57/km^{2})
- Time zone: UTC−7 (Mountain [MST])
  - Summer (DST): UTC−6 (MDT)
- ZIP code: 59501
- Area code: 406
- FIPS code: 30-35050
- GNIS feature ID: 2410715
- Website: ci.havre.mt.us

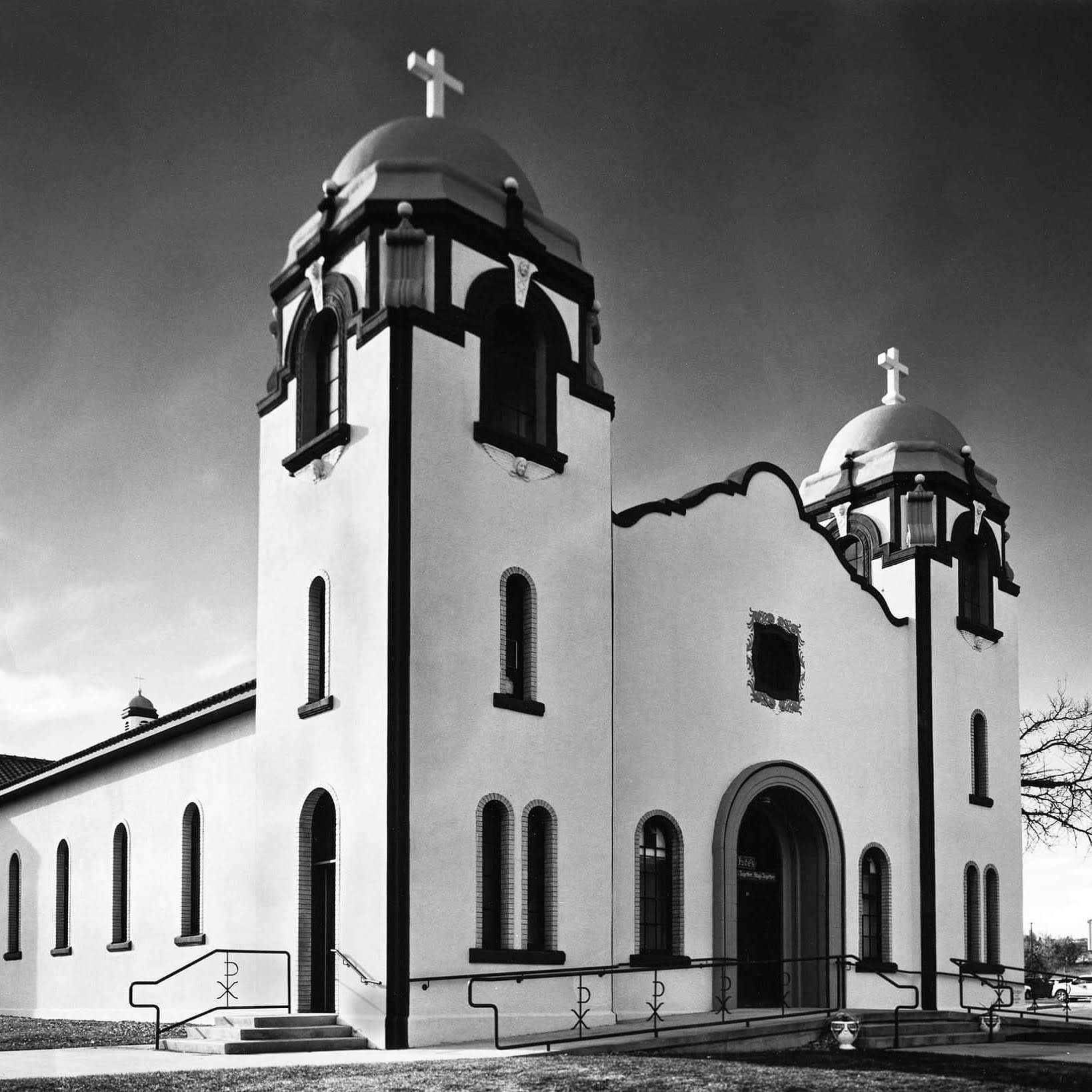
Saint Jude Thaddeus Church, Havre

Havre (/ˈhævər/ HAV-ər) is the county seat of and the largest city in Hill County, Montana, United States. Havre is nicknamed the crown jewel of the Hi-Line. It is said to be named after the city of Le Havre in France. As of the 2020 census the population was 9,362.

== History ==
Havre was incorporated in north-central Montana on September 5, 1893. In August 1893, twenty-six people voted to incorporate Havre as a city on September 5 of that year. The townsite was platted south of the railroad tracks on parts of Descelles’ and Simon Pepin’s ranches. Like many railroad towns, Havre’s streets were set in a grid formation, with the east–west orientation of the railroad serving as the northern boundary of the town running parallel to the south by Main Street, which fronted the railroad tracks, followed by First through Third Streets. The avenues ran perpendicular to the tracks with Third Avenue running south from the Great Northern depot. The depot served as the gateway to the commercial district of Havre. First Street between Second Avenue and Fourth Avenue served as the main commercial street, and Third Avenue became the main avenue. The buildings in Havre during the 1890s were typical first-generation structures and mainly consisted of tar papered wood-framed shacks. Built close together, these buildings were false-fronted and one story high, with a few scattered one-and-a-half and two-story buildings, like the Windsor Hotel on the south side of First Street between Third and Fourth Avenues.

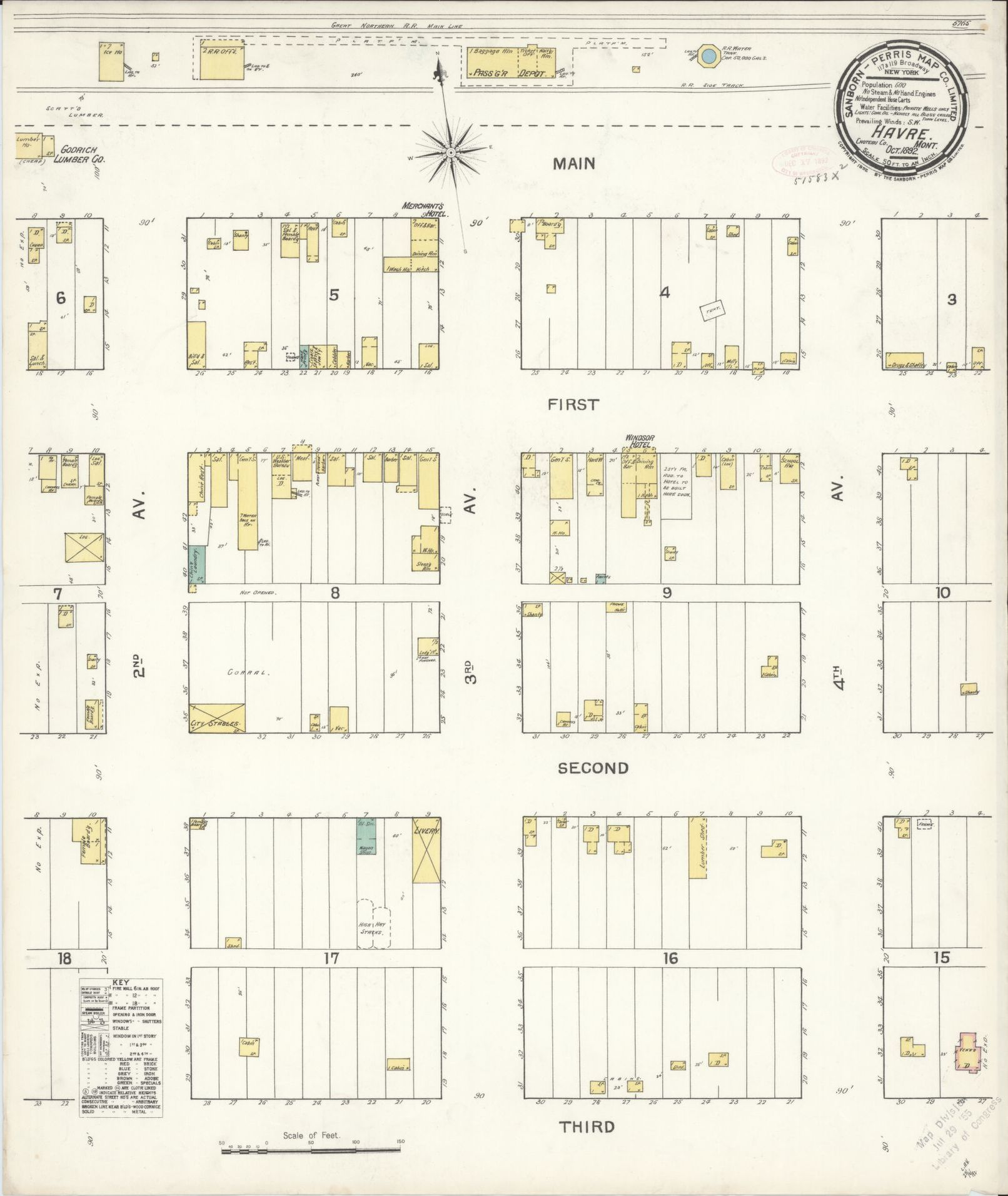
Detail of 1892 Havre Sanborn Map

Along with its annex, the Windsor, at two stories, was the tallest building on First Street until brick structures were constructed in the mid-1890s. Havre had many businesses typical of a frontier town including saloons, barbers, restaurants, Chinese laundries, cobblers, bakeries, mercantiles, hardware stores, and hotels. Havre was founded primarily to serve as a major railroad service center for the Great Northern Railway built by James J. Hill with the city's location midway between Seattle and Minneapolis-St. Paul. A statue of Hill stands near the Havre Amtrak station to commemorate the key contributions his railroad has made to Havre's and Montana's history. Next to the station on display is Great Northern S-2 Class #2584, a 4-8-4 "Northern" type steam locomotive that served the station while it was in passenger service.

Originally named "Bullhook Bottoms", the town held a series of meetings to determine a new name. The original settlers were given the final decision, and due to a strong French influence, the town was renamed "Havre". Though that first meeting ended in a brawl, the second meeting was more successful. There, the citizenry agreed that only the original five homesteaders, Gus Decelles, Exzelia James Pepin (nephew of Simon Pepin), Tom McDevitt, Joe Demars and Charlie Goutchie would be allowed to vote. After several suggestions, including "France" to acknowledge their common heritage, Gus Decelles then suggested Havre after his parents’ hometown of Le Havre, France. "Havre", which means "the haven or harbor", won the vote.

Simon Pepin (1840–1914), the "Father of Havre", was born in Quebec and emigrated to Montana in 1863, where he became a contractor, furnishing supplies for the construction of Fort Custer, Fort Assinniboine, and Fort Maginnis. Pepin purchased ranch land near Fort Assinniboine. When James J. Hill built the Great Northern Railway across northern Montana, he built several locomotive shops on property Pepin owned at the site of Havre. Pepin became a major contributor to Havre's economic growth through his cattle, real estate, and banking enterprises.

View of Havre Montana in the first half of the 20th century

Havre is the eighth-largest city in Montana, and the largest city in the Montana section of the Hi-Line. With the nearest larger city, Great Falls, about 120 miles (190 km) to the south, Havre serves as a medical and business center for the Montana section of the Hi-Line. U.S. Highway 87 has its northern terminus at Havre. U.S. Highway 2, running east–west, is the city's main street. The largest employers are Northern Montana Hospital, Montana State University–Northern, and the Burlington Northern and Santa Fe Railway (BNSF). Throughout much of the twentieth century, BNSF was the most prominent employer in the city, but the company scaled back its workforce in Havre in the 1990s. The Milk River (tributary of the Missouri River) runs through the town, and the Bears Paw Mountains can be seen to the south.

Small grids of purple squares can be seen in some of the sidewalks downtown. These are skylights for an underground mall built in the city at least a hundred years ago. Throughout its history, this underground area has been host to a brothel, a Chinese laundromat, a saloon, a drugstore, at least three opium dens, and rooms used for smuggling alcohol during Prohibition. When fire destroyed Havre's business district in 1904, legitimate above-ground businesses joined the illicit businesses operating in the underground while the new brick buildings were built in the streets above. The underground area, now designated "Havre Beneath the Streets", currently operates as a tourist attraction.

The Wahkpa Chu'gn buffalo jump, or bison kill, is located behind the Holiday Village Shopping Center near the northwest corner of Havre. Over 2,000 years old, it is one of the largest and best-preserved buffalo jumps anywhere. In prehistoric times, Native Americans would drive bison over the edge of the cliff, killing or severely injuring the animals. Afterward, the Native Americans skinned the animals and preserved the meat. The buffalo jump is now an archaeological site and a small tourist attraction.

The buffalo jump is located at the southern edge of the Havre Badlands, a badlands formation that runs alongside the Milk River to the west of the city. Small fossils, including seashells and petrified wood, can be found in the limestone sediment in this area.

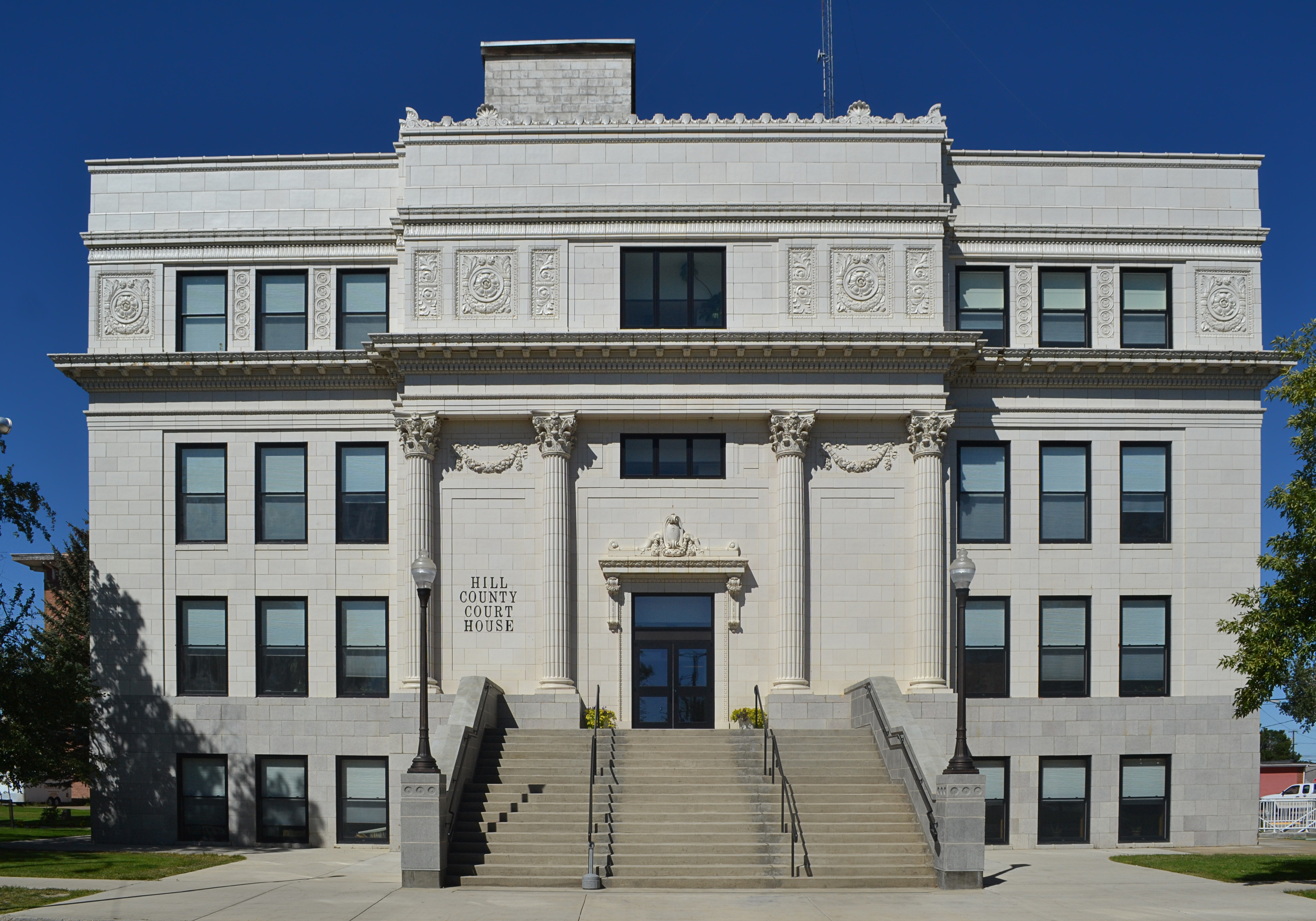
Hill County Courthouse in downtown Havre

Fort Assinniboine is 6 miles (10 km) southwest of Havre. The fort served as one of Montana's principal military posts from 1879 through the Prohibition era. The fort was one of many used by the United States to protect against potential attacks from Native Americans and to block incursions from Canada. At its peak, the fort housed and employed 489 soldiers in 104 buildings.

Also near Havre is the Bear's Paw Battlefield site of the Battle of Bear Paw, where the Nez Perce were attacked and defeated by the U.S. Cavalry. Chief Joseph surrendered to the Cavalry and made a famous speech ending with the line, "From where the sun now stands, I will fight no more forever."

In 2018, two natural-born U.S. citizens were detained by U.S. Customs and Border Protection agents; in 2020, they settled with CBP for an undisclosed sum.

== Geography ==
Havre is located in eastern Hill County, on the Milk River. U.S. Route 2 (1st Street) is the main road through the city, running east to west near the city's northern border. Route 2 leads east 87 miles (140 km) to Malta and west 102 miles (164 km) to Shelby and Interstate 15. U.S. Route 87 has its northern terminus in West Havre, 3 miles (5 km) west of downtown Havre. US 87 leads southwest 110 miles (180 km) to Great Falls. Montana Secondary Highway 234 leads south from the center of Havre 30 miles (48 km) to the Bear Paw Ski Bowl in the Bears Paw Mountains.

According to the United States Census Bureau, Havre has a total area of 3.28 square miles (8.50 km^{2}), all land.

=== Climate ===
Climate chart for Havre

Havre experiences a semi-arid climate (Köppen BSk) with long, cold, dry winters and hot summers with cool nights. Winter weather can vary greatly from brutal cold when Arctic air moves in from Canada, to temperatures far above 32 °F or 0 °C due to chinook winds – for instance the coldest month (and only one to never top freezing) of January 1916 averaged −13.3 °F or −25.2 °C and February 1936 during a notorious cold wave −12.8 °F or −24.9 °C, but February 1954 averaged as high as 37.1 °F or 2.8 °C and January 1919, 34.1 °F or 1.2 °C. The hottest temperature recorded in Havre is 111 °F or 43.9 °C on August 5, 1961, and the coldest −57 °F or −49.4 °C on January 27, 1916.

Climate data for Havre City–County Airport, 1991–2020 normals, extremes 1880–present
Month	Jan	Feb	Mar	Apr	May	Jun	Jul	Aug	Sep	Oct	Nov	Dec	Year
Record high °F (°C)	68 (20)	74 (23)	79 (26)	95 (35)	98 (37)	108 (42)	108 (42)	111 (44)	103 (39)	91 (33)	78 (26)	71 (22)	111 (44)
Mean maximum °F (°C)	51.5 (10.8)	54.1 (12.3)	67.1 (19.5)	79.1 (26.2)	86.4 (30.2)	92.5 (33.6)	99.1 (37.3)	99.1 (37.3)	92.7 (33.7)	80.0 (26.7)	65.5 (18.6)	53.8 (12.1)	101.1 (38.4)
Mean daily maximum °F (°C)	28.3 (−2.1)	32.5 (0.3)	44.0 (6.7)	57.3 (14.1)	67.5 (19.7)	75.7 (24.3)	85.8 (29.9)	84.6 (29.2)	73.0 (22.8)	57.5 (14.2)	42.1 (5.6)	31.7 (−0.2)	56.7 (13.7)
Daily mean °F (°C)	17.7 (−7.9)	21.3 (−5.9)	32.0 (0.0)	44.0 (6.7)	53.9 (12.2)	62.1 (16.7)	69.8 (21.0)	68.4 (20.2)	57.7 (14.3)	44.1 (6.7)	30.9 (−0.6)	21.1 (−6.1)	43.6 (6.4)
Mean daily minimum °F (°C)	7.2 (−13.8)	10.1 (−12.2)	20.1 (−6.6)	30.6 (−0.8)	40.2 (4.6)	48.5 (9.2)	53.9 (12.2)	52.2 (11.2)	42.5 (5.8)	30.7 (−0.7)	19.7 (−6.8)	10.5 (−11.9)	30.5 (−0.8)
Mean minimum °F (°C)	−23.5 (−30.8)	−17.1 (−27.3)	−5.1 (−20.6)	14.8 (−9.6)	26.2 (−3.2)	37.3 (2.9)	43.9 (6.6)	39.5 (4.2)	28.1 (−2.2)	11.0 (−11.7)	−5.9 (−21.1)	−16.4 (−26.9)	−31.3 (−35.2)
Record low °F (°C)	−57 (−49)	−55 (−48)	−41 (−41)	−14 (−26)	14 (−10)	29 (−2)	31 (−1)	27 (−3)	18 (−8)	−21 (−29)	−33 (−36)	−50 (−46)	−57 (−49)
Average precipitation inches (mm)	0.43 (11)	0.38 (9.7)	0.50 (13)	1.01 (26)	1.86 (47)	2.49 (63)	1.53 (39)	0.92 (23)	1.06 (27)	0.75 (19)	0.49 (12)	0.40 (10)	11.82 (300)
Average snowfall inches (cm)	9.0 (23)	6.9 (18)	5.2 (13)	2.7 (6.9)	0.4 (1.0)	0.0 (0.0)	0.0 (0.0)	0.0 (0.0)	0.4 (1.0)	2.0 (5.1)	6.2 (16)	8.2 (21)	41.0 (104)
Average precipitation days (≥ 0.01 in)	6.7	6.3	6.1	7.9	10.5	12.1	7.7	6.9	6.8	6.6	6.4	6.2	90.2
Average snowy days (≥ 0.1 in)	7.2	5.6	4.2	2.1	0.3	0.0	0.0	0.0	0.1	1.2	4.4	5.9	31.0
Mean monthly sunshine hours	140.5	175.2	257.6	286.9	346.9	367.8	408.9	362.6	276.5	217.4	141.4	125.6	3,107.3
Percentage possible sunshine	51	61	70	70	73	76	84	82	73	65	51	48	67
Source 1: NOAA (sun 1961–1988)
Source 2: National Weather Service

Climate data for Fort Assiniboine, Montana, 1991–2020 normals, extremes 1917–present
Month	Jan	Feb	Mar	Apr	May	Jun	Jul	Aug	Sep	Oct	Nov	Dec	Year
Record high °F (°C)	68 (20)	75 (24)	82 (28)	94 (34)	98 (37)	108 (42)	107 (42)	111 (44)	102 (39)	91 (33)	78 (26)	69 (21)	111 (44)
Mean maximum °F (°C)	51.9 (11.1)	54.0 (12.2)	66.3 (19.1)	78.4 (25.8)	85.9 (29.9)	91.4 (33.0)	98.0 (36.7)	98.3 (36.8)	92.4 (33.6)	80.4 (26.9)	64.7 (18.2)	54.6 (12.6)	100.2 (37.9)
Mean daily maximum °F (°C)	28.2 (−2.1)	32.7 (0.4)	44.0 (6.7)	57.0 (13.9)	67.0 (19.4)	75.0 (23.9)	85.3 (29.6)	84.4 (29.1)	73.1 (22.8)	57.7 (14.3)	42.2 (5.7)	31.6 (−0.2)	56.5 (13.6)
Daily mean °F (°C)	17.8 (−7.9)	21.5 (−5.8)	31.7 (−0.2)	43.7 (6.5)	53.6 (12.0)	61.7 (16.5)	69.5 (20.8)	68.2 (20.1)	57.9 (14.4)	44.2 (6.8)	31.0 (−0.6)	21.1 (−6.1)	43.5 (6.4)
Mean daily minimum °F (°C)	7.3 (−13.7)	10.2 (−12.1)	19.4 (−7.0)	30.5 (−0.8)	40.2 (4.6)	48.5 (9.2)	53.7 (12.1)	52.1 (11.2)	42.7 (5.9)	30.7 (−0.7)	19.9 (−6.7)	10.6 (−11.9)	30.5 (−0.8)
Mean minimum °F (°C)	−21.0 (−29.4)	−14.8 (−26.0)	−4.8 (−20.4)	15.6 (−9.1)	26.7 (−2.9)	38.0 (3.3)	44.6 (7.0)	40.6 (4.8)	29.9 (−1.2)	12.1 (−11.1)	−5.0 (−20.6)	−14.2 (−25.7)	−27.8 (−33.2)
Record low °F (°C)	−49 (−45)	−48 (−44)	−34 (−37)	−11 (−24)	11 (−12)	30 (−1)	37 (3)	30 (−1)	12 (−11)	−21 (−29)	−28 (−33)	−44 (−42)	−49 (−45)
Average precipitation inches (mm)	0.42 (11)	0.34 (8.6)	0.47 (12)	1.18 (30)	2.12 (54)	2.93 (74)	1.67 (42)	0.96 (24)	1.18 (30)	0.89 (23)	0.62 (16)	0.36 (9.1)	13.14 (333.7)
Average snowfall inches (cm)	6.4 (16)	7.3 (19)	4.0 (10)	2.7 (6.9)	0.7 (1.8)	0.0 (0.0)	0.0 (0.0)	0.0 (0.0)	0.0 (0.0)	1.9 (4.8)	5.2 (13)	6.4 (16)	34.6 (87.5)
Average extreme snow depth inches (cm)	7.8 (20)	7.4 (19)	6.7 (17)	2.0 (5.1)	0.6 (1.5)	0.0 (0.0)	0.0 (0.0)	0.0 (0.0)	0.0 (0.0)	1.6 (4.1)	3.6 (9.1)	5.3 (13)	11.4 (29)
Average precipitation days (≥ 0.01 in)	6.5	5.1	5.2	7.6	11.4	12.8	7.6	6.5	7.3	6.7	5.8	5.3	87.8
Average snowy days (≥ 0.1 in)	6.5	4.9	3.4	1.1	0.4	0.0	0.0	0.0	0.0	0.8	3.4	5.4	25.9
Source 1: NOAA
Source 2: National Weather Service

== Demographics ==
Historical population
Census	Pop.	Note	%±
1900	1,033		—
1910	3,624		250.8%
1920	5,429		49.8%
1930	6,372		17.4%
1940	6,427		0.9%
1950	8,086		25.8%
1960	10,740		32.8%
1970	10,558		−1.7%
1980	10,891		3.2%
1990	10,201		−6.3%
2000	9,621		−5.7%
2010	9,310		−3.2%
2020	9,362		0.6%
source: U.S. Decennial Census

=== 2020 census ===
As of the 2020 census, Havre had a population of 9,362. The median age was 34.6 years. 24.5% of residents were under the age of 18 and 16.4% of residents were 65 years of age or older. For every 100 females there were 95.5 males, and for every 100 females age 18 and over there were 93.3 males age 18 and over.

100.0% of residents lived in urban areas, while 0.0% lived in rural areas.

There were 3,880 households in Havre, of which 29.9% had children under the age of 18 living in them. Of all households, 41.3% were married-couple households, 22.4% were households with a male householder and no spouse or partner present, and 28.6% were households with a female householder and no spouse or partner present. About 35.2% of all households were made up of individuals and 13.4% had someone living alone who was 65 years of age or older.

There were 4,478 housing units, of which 13.4% were vacant. The homeowner vacancy rate was 2.4% and the rental vacancy rate was 16.1%.

Racial composition as of the 2020 census
Race	Number	Percent
White	7,062	75.4%
Black or African American	34	0.4%
American Indian and Alaska Native	1,276	13.6%
Asian	71	0.8%
Native Hawaiian and Other Pacific Islander	6	0.1%
Some other race	75	0.8%
Two or more races	838	9.0%
Hispanic or Latino (of any race)	348	3.7%

=== 2010 census ===
As of the 2010 census, there were 9,310 people, 3,900 households, and 2,293 families living in the city. The population density was 2,838.4 inhabitants per square mile (1,095.9/km^{2}). There were 4,285 housing units at an average density of 1,306.4 per square mile (504.4/km^{2}). The racial makeup of the city was 81.6% White, 0.4% African American, 13.0% Native American, 0.6% Asian, 0.1% Pacific Islander, 0.3% from other races, and 4.0% from two or more races. Hispanic or Latino of any race were 2.5% of the population.

There were 3,900 households, of which 30.1% had children under the age of 18 living with them, 41.3% were married couples living together, 12.1% had a female householder with no husband present, 5.5% had a male householder with no wife present, and 41.2% were non-families. 33.8% of all households were made up of individuals, and 12% had someone living alone who was 65 years of age or older. The average household size was 2.30 and the average family size was 2.98.

The median age in the city was 33.9 years. 25.1% of residents were under the age of 18; 12.8% were between the ages of 18 and 24; 23.5% were from 25 to 44; 25.2% were from 45 to 64; and 13.4% were 65 years of age or older. The gender makeup of the city was 49.8% male and 50.2% female.

=== 2000 census ===
As of the 2000 census, there were 9,621 people, 4,015 households, and 2,449 families living in the city. The population density was 2,778.2 inhabitants per square mile (1,072.7/km^{2}). There were 4,400 housing units at an average density of 1,270.6 per square mile (490.6/km^{2}). The racial makeup of the city was 87.08% White, 0.11% African American, 9.01% Native American, 0.49% Asian, 0.02% Pacific Islander, 0.51% from other races, and 2.78% from two or more races. Hispanic or Latino of any race were 1.48% of the population.

There were 4,015 households, out of which 31.9% had children under the age of 18 living with them, 45.2% were married couples living together, 11.5% had a female householder with no husband present, and 39.0% were non-families. 32.6% of all households were made up of individuals, and 13.2% had someone living alone who was 65 years of age or older. The average household size was 2.32 and the average family size was 2.95.

In the city, the population was spread out, with 25.7% under the age of 18, 13.6% from 18 to 24, 25.4% from 25 to 44, 20.6% from 45 to 64, and 14.6% who were 65 years of age or older. The median age was 34 years. For every 100 females there were 96.8 males. For every 100 females age 18 and over, there were 92.3 males.

The median income for a household in the city was $29,944, and the median income for a family was $38,870. Males had a median income of $30,401 versus $19,189 for females. The per capita income for the city was $15,847. About 14.8% of families and 17.5% of the population were below the poverty line, including 22.0% of those under age 18 and 7.8% of those age 65 or over.

== Arts and culture ==
The H. Earl Clack Museum has exhibits on Native American history, pioneer life, and the Great Northern Railway. It is part of the Montana Dinosaur Trail. More early Montana history can be seen at Fort Assinniboine, one of the oldest and largest Army installations in Montana. Self-guided walking tour maps for both the historic residential and business districts are available from the local Chamber of Commerce.

Outdoor recreation can be found in all seasons. Beaver Creek Park claims to be the largest county park in the United States. It covers over 10,000 acres and offers fishing, hiking, camping, and wildlife viewing. Bear Paw Ski Bowl, 30 miles south of town, has 24 downhill runs.

Havre has a public library, the Havre-Hill County Library.

=== Points of interest ===
- LORAN-C transmitter Havre
- Big Bud 747, the world's largest farm tractor
- Wahkpa Chu'gn, a buffalo jump archaeological site, open to visitors
- The Havre Underground, a tourist attraction in the historic under city

== Government ==
Havre has a mayor and city council. The council consists of eight members representing four wards. Wade Bitz was elected mayor in 2025. He replaced Doug Kaercher who did not run for re-election.

== Education ==
The city is served by Havre Public Schools, which operates Havre High School, S.U.N.S. Alternative High School, Havre Middle School, and three elementary schools.

Higher education is provided at the Montana State University-Northern campus.

The city hosts one private school within city limits, Saint Judes Thaddeus School; it is affiliated with the Roman Catholic Diocese of Great Falls–Billings.

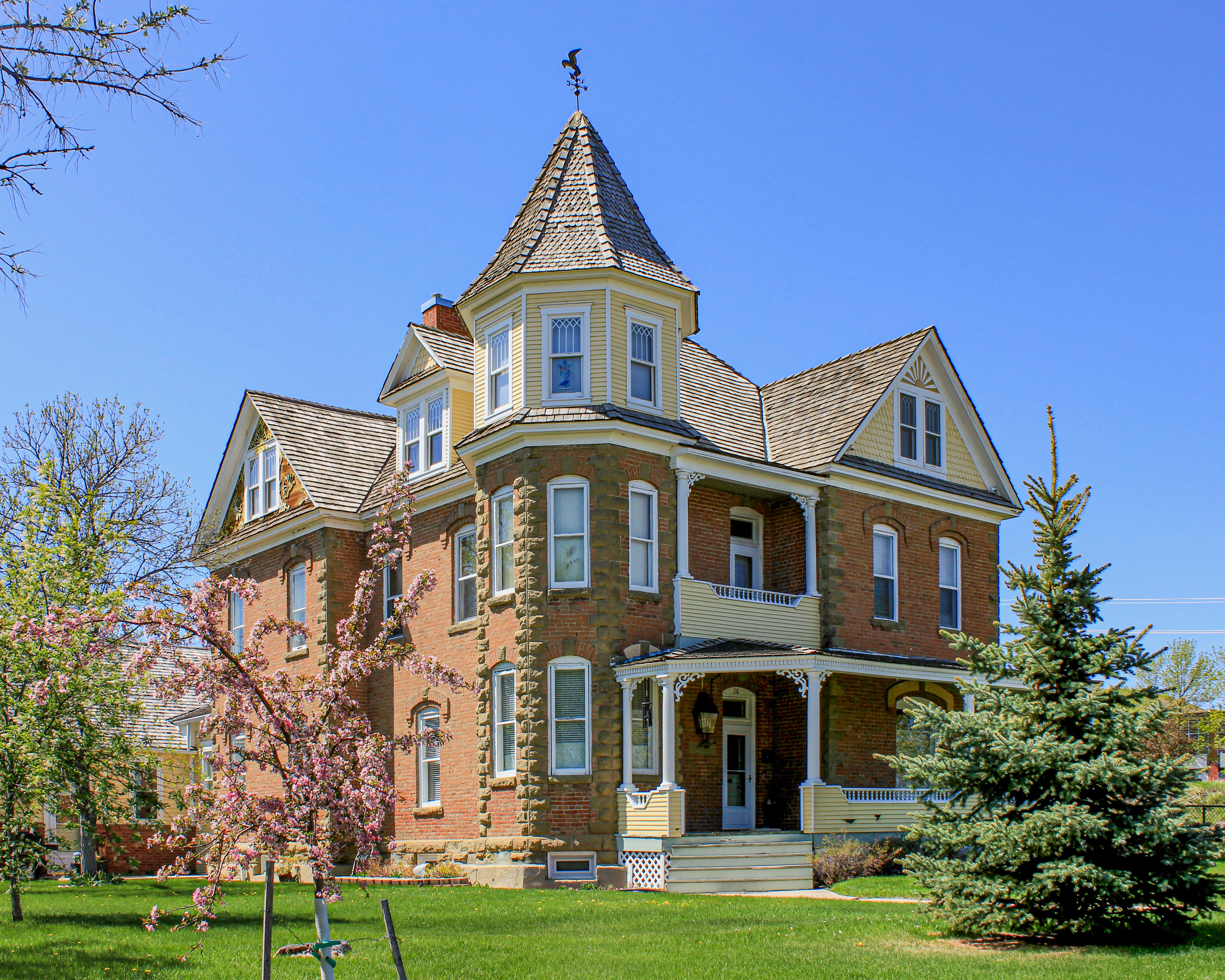
Gussenhoven House, Havre, Hill County, Montana

== Local media ==
=== Radio ===
- KOJM AM 610/FM 98.3 (Classic Hits)
- KNMC FM 90.1 (College Radio)
- KPQX FM 92.5 (Country)
- KPQX-HD2 (Legendary Country)
- KPQX-HD3 (The Rock)
- KXEI FM 95.1 (Christian)
- KRYK FM 101.3 (Hot Adult contemporary)
- KRYK-HD2 (CHR/Pop)
- KRYK-HD3 (CBS Sports Radio)

=== Television ===
Stations available from the Great Falls market:

- KRTV Ch. 3 (CBS)
- KTGF-LD Ch. 50 (NBC)
- KUGF-TV Ch. 21 (PBS)
- KFBB Ch. 5 (ABC/Fox)

Satellite television providers are available to the entire area, and cable service comes from Charter Cable.

=== Newspapers ===
The Havre Weekly Chronicle is regionally available. Its circulation is 3,500 papers published weekly. It has a full online edition by subscription, as well as some free content online. The larger Great Falls Tribune is also available in most areas. The Havre Herald was a free online site for local news that ran from 2018 to mid-2020.

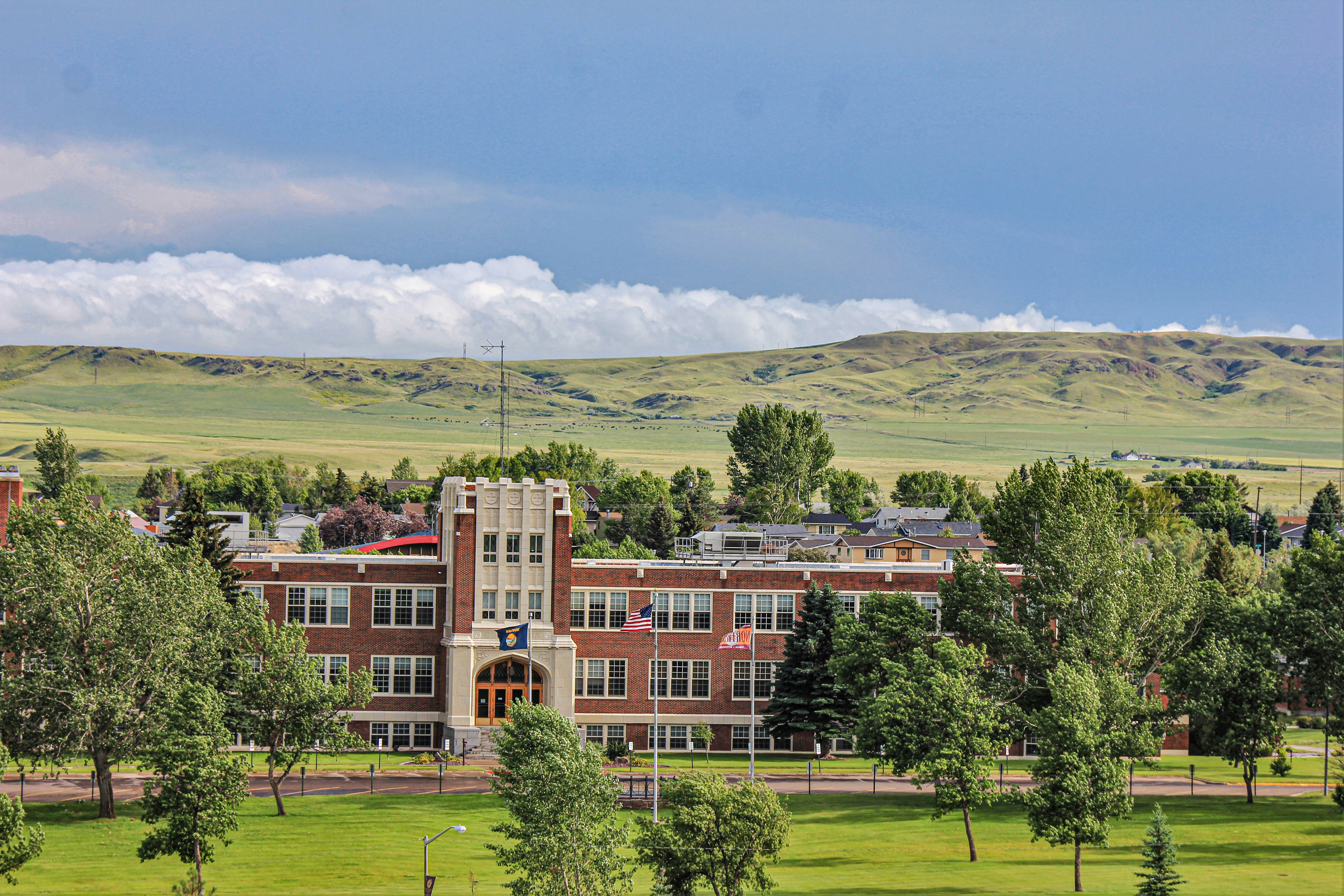
Cowan Hall, Montana State University-Northern.

== Transportation ==
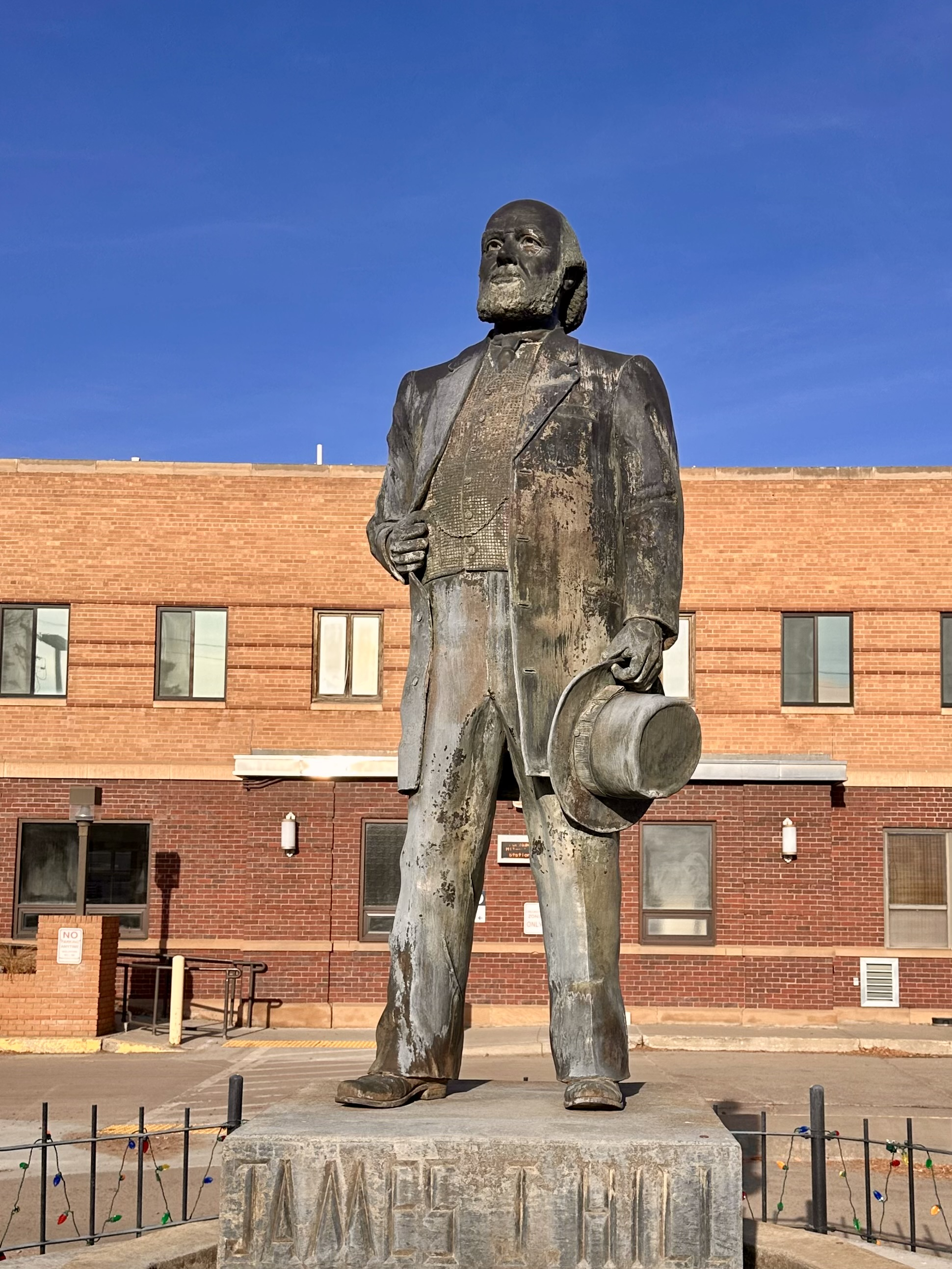
James Jerome Hill in front of the Amtrak Station, Havre, Montana

Havre is located on the Northern Transcon of the BNSF Railway; Amtrak's Empire Builder stops at Havre station daily. Havre City–County Airport is a public use airport located three miles (4.8 km) west of Havre. North Central Montana Transit provides limited bus service to Great Falls, Montana, the Rocky Boy's Indian Reservation, Harlem, Montana, and Fort Belknap, Montana.

== Notable people ==
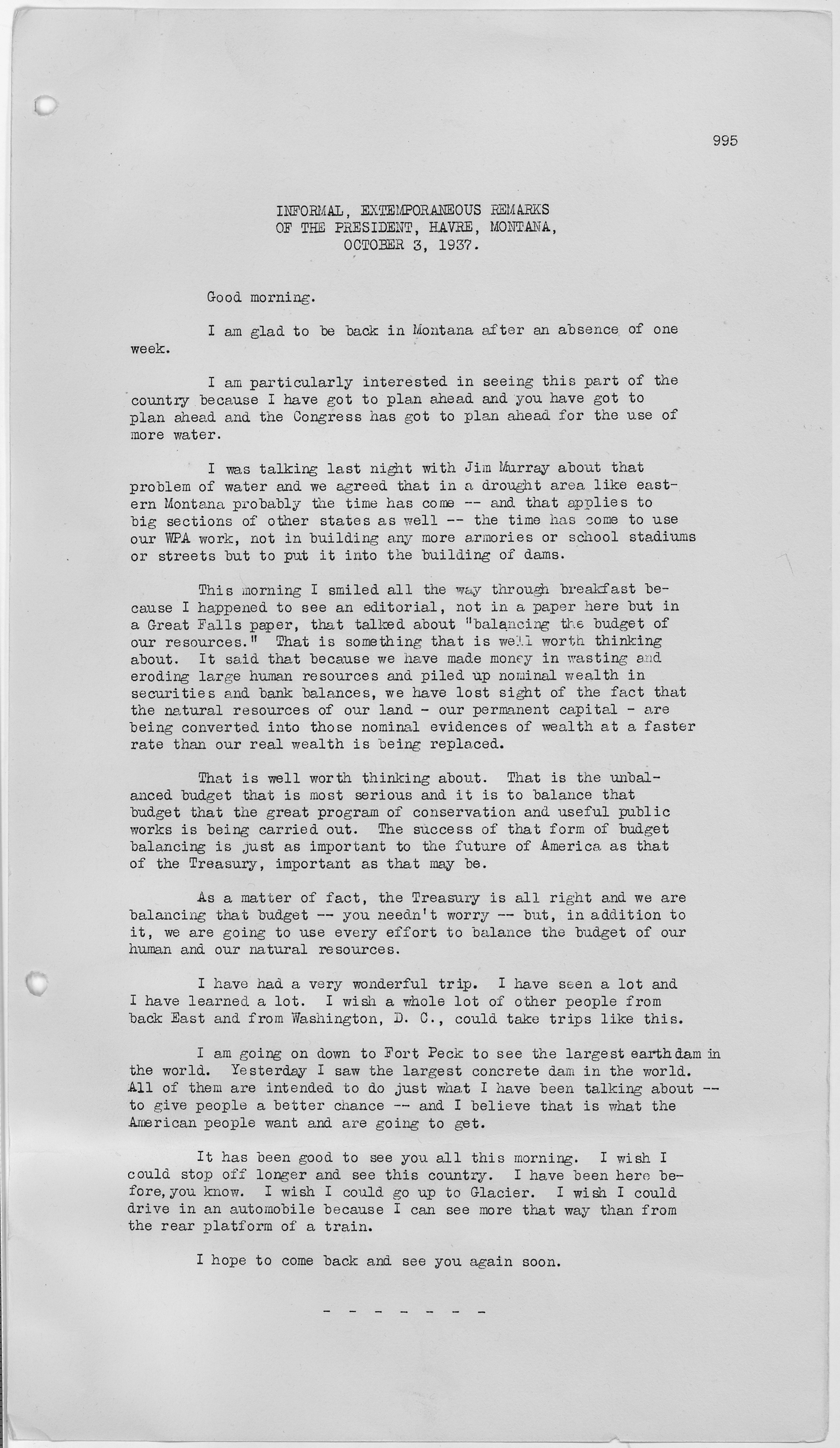
Remarks by FDR on a balanced budget on 1937 visit to Havre

- Philip Aaberg, pianist and composer
- John Ahern, Washington state legislator and businessman
- Jeff Ament, musician, Pearl Jam's bassist
- Karan Armstrong, opera singer
- Jacob Bachmeier, one of the youngest state legislators in the United States
- Harriet Bossnot, social and civic worker
- T.V. Buttrey, academic and numismatist
- Ryan Divish, journalist for the Seattle Times
- Jeff Doyle, Major League Baseball player
- Larry Heck, AI expert, Co-Founder of Microsoft Cortana
- William Hulett, actor in Cirque du Soleil, Zumanity
- Marc Mariani, former NFL football player
- Larry Maze, bishop of the Episcopal Diocese of Arkansas, 1994–2006
- Jill McLain, Miss Montana USA 2006
- Karl Ohs, former lieutenant governor of Montana
- Flint Rasmussen, professional rodeo clown
- Rob Ryan, Major League Baseball player
- Rick Rydell, radio talk show host and outdoors author
- Brian Schweitzer, governor of Montana 2005–2013
- Stan Stephens, governor of Montana 1989–1993
- Jon Tester, U.S. senator for Montana
- Mike Tilleman, former NFL football player
- Paul Tuss, current state legislator

== See also ==
- Fort Assinniboine
- Havre station
- Montana State University–Northern
- Rocky Boy Indian Reservation
