= 1945 in rail transport =

This article lists events related to rail transport that occurred in 1945.

== Events ==
=== January events ===
- January 1 – The national railway operator in the Republic of Ireland, Great Southern Railways, with responsibility for the southern part of the Irish railway network is merged into a new national transport operator, Córas Iompair Éireann (CIÉ).
- January 10 – Los Angeles streetcars make their last run.
- January 12 – Bituminous Coal Research Incorporated's Locomotive Study Group, made up of representatives from eastern railroads and locomotive manufacturers in the United States, meets to find ways to combat the rise of the diesel locomotive. They decide reciprocating steam is dead, and to explore coal-fired turbines.
- January 13 – Operation Woodlark: an Allied commando company in Norway blows up the Jørstadelva Bridge; later, a military troop train is derailed and crashed into the river below, killing 70–80 people, the most deadly rail incident ever in Norway.
- January 19 – United States Army Transportation Corps personnel operate their first train on the Luzon Military Railway (over Manila Railway Company track) in the Philippines.

=== February events ===
- February 23 – The Treuchtlingen railway station in Bavaria is bombed during World War II; with over 600 killed and 1500 injured, it is the worst railroad disaster in German history.
- February – General Motors Electro-Motive Division introduces the EMD E7.

=== March events ===
- March 6 – German military engineers blow up the Deutsche Reichsbahn's Hohenzollern Bridge across the Rhine at Cologne to inhibit the Allied assault on the city.
- March 25 – Virginian Railway takes delivery of its first 2-6-6-6 (class AG) steam locomotives from Lima Locomotive Works.

=== April events ===
- April 13 – Franklin D. Roosevelt's funeral train begins its journey.
- April 27 – Austria's state railway becomes independent of the Deutsche Reichsbahn as the Österreichische Staatseisenbahn (ÖStB).
- April – The first airlifts of U.S. Army Transportation Corps metre-gauge petrol locomotives into Burma take place.

=== May events ===
- May 12 – The Rev. W. V. Awdry's book for children The Three Railway Engines is published in Leicester, England, the first in what is to become The Railway Series.
- May 14 – Lima Locomotive Works ships the last Shay locomotive: Western Maryland Railway number 6.
- May 25 – 'La Trochita' 750 mm (2 ft 5 1/2 in) narrow gauge railway in Patagonia is completed throughout to Esquel, Argentina.

=== July events ===
- July 16 – Canadian National Railway opens its ore dock at Port Arthur, Ontario.
- July 23 – Chicago, Burlington and Quincy Railroad introduces the first Vistadome car, Silver Dome, in the consist of the Twin Cities Zephyr.
- July 30 – First SNCF Class 141R 2-8-2 steam locomotive completed by Lima Locomotive Works in the United States for service in France. 1340 of the class are built in North America.
- July 31 – General Motors Electro-Motive Division completes the EMD F3 demonstrator.

=== August events ===
- August 9 – Michigan train wreck: Near Michigan City, North Dakota, the second section of the Great Northern Railway's Empire Builder rear-ends the stalled first section at an estimated 45 mph, killing 34 people and injuring 110 others. The first section had been forced to stop due to a hotbox on the locomotive's tender; the collision occurs before a flagman had time to protect the rear of the train.
- August 14 – Kyōbashi Station becomes one of the last sites to be bombed in Japan during World War II when a one-ton bomb directly strikes the Katamachi Line platform as part of the bombing of Osaka, killing 700 to 800 evacuees.
- August 24 – The Yosemite Valley Railroad, which has operated between Merced, California, and Yosemite National Park, runs its last trains.
- August – The Chinese Eastern Railway comes under the joint control of China and the Soviet Union.

=== September events ===
- September 27 – The Arlberg Orient Express resumes operations after World War II.

=== October events ===
- October 2 – Piccadilly Circus tube station becomes the first on the London Underground to be lit by fluorescent light.

=== December events ===
- December 1 – The Milwaukee Road emerges from its 1935 bankruptcy through reorganization.
- December 13 – The New York Central Railroad places what is up to now the largest single order for passenger equipment: 420 cars.

=== Unknown date events ===
- Tata Engineering and Locomotive Company established in India.

== Deaths ==
=== June deaths ===
- June 14 – Matthew S. Sloan, president of the Missouri–Kansas–Texas Railroad, in New York City (born 1881).

=== July deaths ===
- July 5 – Julius Dorpmüller, German railway administrator (born 1869).

=== October deaths ===
- October 12 – Charles Fairburn, Chief Mechanical Engineer of the London, Midland and Scottish Railway 1944–1945 (born 1887).
- October 27 – George Hughes, Chief Mechanical Engineer for the Lancashire and Yorkshire Railway 1904–1922, the London and North Western Railway 1922–1923 and the London, Midland and Scottish Railway 1925–1931 (born 1865).

== Accidents ==
- January 10 – Ballymacarrett rail crash on the Belfast and County Down Railway in Northern Ireland: Passenger trains collide in rear in fog: 22 killed, 27 injured.
- January 11 – A collision at Rozières-sur-Mouzon, on the line between Nancy and Dijon in France, kills 23 people and injures 9.
- January 18 – At the branch-line terminus of Saint-Valery-en-Caux in Allied-occupied France, a 45-car train full of American troops runs away and crashes through the buffer stop. 89 are killed and 152 injured.
- February 1 – At El Cazadero in Querétaro, Mexico, two passenger trains both going to the festival at San Juan de los Lagos collide and three of the cars catch fire; 127 are killed.
- February 4 – King's Cross railway accident: A collision at the London terminus caused by a train sliding backwards on slippery rails kills 2.
- March 22 – In the north west of British India (modern-day Pakistan), a passenger train from Karachi to Rohri is rear-ended at Jungshahi by a goods train; 24 people are killed and 43 injured.
- March 23 – Hundreds of passengers die in Indonesia after a railroad bridge breaks, causing a passenger train to crash and slide into the Anai Valley in Tanah Datar.
- June 13 – At Baschi, near Orvieto on the line from Florence to Rome in Italy, the driver of a freight train including 15 tank cars of gasoline misinterprets a hand signal and proceeds, colliding head-on with a passenger train with many Italian and some British soldiers aboard. The resulting fire is so devastating that the number of dead can only be estimated, at about 70; 100 people are taken to hospital with injuries.
- June 15 – Near Milton, Pennsylvania, the Buffalo-bound Pennsylvania Railroad Dominion Express derails, killing some 18 aboard..
- July 16 – At Aßling, near Munich in Germany, a US Army train carrying tanks runs into a passenger train which had stalled due to an engine breakdown after the American signalman tells the freight train to proceed despite the track still being occupied. More than 100 German POWs are killed as the mostly wooden coaches of the passenger train are destroyed.
- July 21 – A London Midland and Scottish Railway express passenger train overruns signals and collides with a freight train that is shunting at Ecclefechan in Scotland: two people are killed and 31 are injured.
- July 27 – At Saint-Fons, near Lyon in France, a passenger train and a munitions train collide, igniting not only the wreckage but also the local gas works, with fatalities.
- August 9 – Michigan, North Dakota train wreck: The first section of the Great Northern's Empire Builder is stopped by a hot box at Michigan City, North Dakota. The crew does not protect the rear, and the second section plows into it: 34 are killed and about 50 injured.
- August 13 – Two trains carrying soldiers on leave in the British-occupied zone of Germany collide head-on at Goch on the single-track branch from Krefeld, reopened only a week before; 21 people are killed.
- September 4 – Due to a signalman's error, a military mixed train consisting of 8 passenger cars followed by 4 empty freight wagons and 19 tank cars of gasoline is diverted into a siding at Kédange-sur-Canner in France where it crashes into a stationary freight train. The resulting fire spreads to the passenger cars; 39 people are killed and 34 injured.
- September 6 − A local train derails and crashes into a safety barrier when an asleep train driver traverses a zig zag at Sasago station on the Chuo Main Line in Yamanashi Prefecture of Japan, killing sixty people.
- September 7 – The bank of the Shropshire Union Canal fails near Sun Bank Halt in Wales and causes the trackbed of the Ruabon–Barmouth line to be washed away for 40 yards (37 m). A Great Western Railway freight train is derailed and one member of staff klled.
- September 9 – A passenger train derails in Iturbe (Argentina), killing 36 and injuring more than 50.
- September 21 – On the Vernaison bridge in France over the Isère at Romans-sur-Isère, with one track still out of service due to wartime damage, a mixed train is signaled onto the single remaining track and collides head-on with a Micheline (railcar) en route from Grenoble to Valence, and there is a fire; 30 people are killed and 106 injured.
- September 30 – Bourne End rail crash: A London, Midland and Scottish Railway sleeping car train approaching London fails to slow down for temporary diversion to slow lines and derails: 43 are killed.
