= Hingham, Montana =

- Town
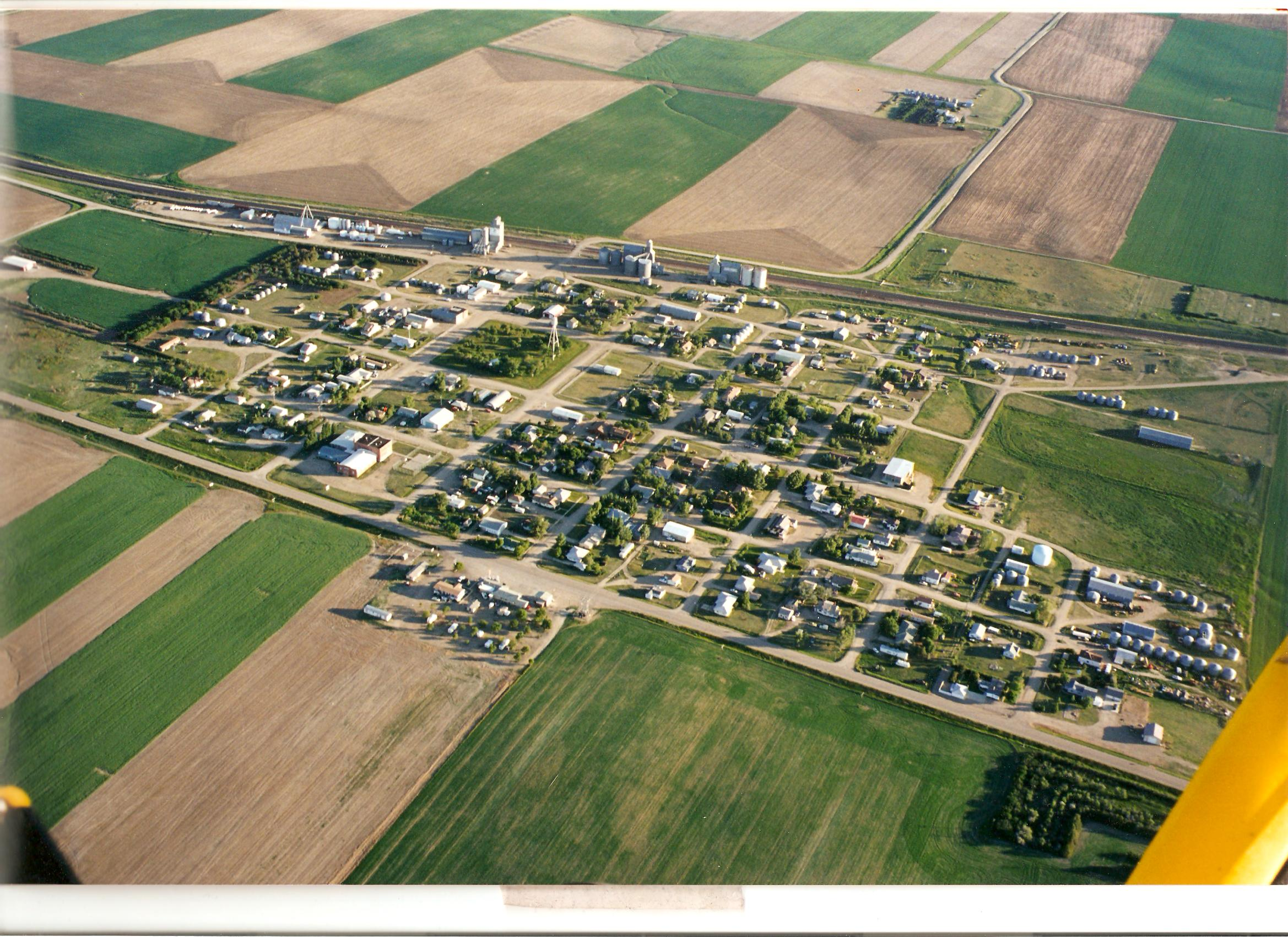

- Location of Hingham, Montana
- Coordinates: 48°33′20″N 110°25′17″W
- Country: United States
- State: Montana
- County: Hill

Area
  - Total: 0.17 sq mi (0.44 km^{2})
  - Land: 0.17 sq mi (0.44 km^{2})
  - Water: 0 sq mi (0.00 km^{2})
- Elevation: 3,025 ft (922 m)

Population (2020)
  - Total: 131
  - Density: 762.7/sq mi (294.49/km^{2})
- Time zone: UTC-7 (Mountain (MST))
  - Summer (DST): UTC-6 (MDT)
- ZIP code: 59528
- Area code: 406
- FIPS code: 30-36400
- GNIS feature ID: 2412755
- Website: hingham.myruralwater.com

Hingham is a town in Hill County, Montana, United States. Its economy is largely agricultural. The population was 131 at the 2020 census.

== Geography ==
Hingham is located on U.S. Route 2, it is 35 miles west of Havre. It is near Fresno Reservoir.

According to the United States Census Bureau, the town has a total area of 0.17 square miles (0.44 km^{2}), all land.

== History of "The Town on the Square" ==
Hingham is a small agricultural community in northern Montana. Hingham, like many Hi-Line towns, developed as a grain storage and shipping center along the Great Northern Railway (BNSF Railway) and U.S. Route 2. In 1909, homesteaders purchased a relinquishment for the town site, and by early 1910 they had a town established. The community was planned on a broad grid with a central town square as its dominant feature. Hingham prospered in its early years with the opening of a school, hospital, several churches and over forty businesses. In 1917 Hingham incorporated with an elected mayor/council style government.

The Hingham Bar (bank) photographed by John Margolies

Community members have developed the town square into one of the best parks on the Hi-Line, much of it through volunteer work and donations. A popular landmark of the town is the water tower which can be seen for miles. The Hingham School was established in 1910 with the Rangers as their mascot and red, white and black as their colors. The school operated until the early 1980s when it consolidated with the neighboring Rudyard School to form Blue Sky Schools. Once again in 2005, Blue Sky Schools consolidated with KG Schools (Kremlin-Gildford) to form North Star Schools. In 2010 Hingham celebrated its Centennial. Hingham shares its name with towns in Wisconsin, Massachusetts and Norfolk, England.

== Demographics ==
Historical population
Census	Pop.	Note	%±
1920	154		—
1930	251		63.0%
1940	205		−18.3%
1950	214		4.4%
1960	254		18.7%
1970	262		3.1%
1980	186		−29.0%
1990	181		−2.7%
2000	157		−13.3%
2010	118		−24.8%
2020	131		11.0%
U.S. Decennial Census

=== 2010 census ===
As of the census of 2010, there were 118 people, 60 households, and 33 families residing in the town. The population density was 694.1 inhabitants per square mile (268.0/km^{2}). There were 83 housing units at an average density of 488.2 per square mile (188.5/km^{2}). The racial makeup of the town was 91.5% White, 3.4% Native American, 0.8% Asian, and 4.2% from two or more races. Hispanic or Latino of any race were 0.8% of the population.

There were 60 households, of which 13.3% had children under the age of 18 living with them, 50.0% were married couples living together, 3.3% had a female householder with no husband present, 1.7% had a male householder with no wife present, and 45.0% were non-families. 40.0% of all households were made up of individuals, and 21.7% had someone living alone who was 65 years of age or older. The average household size was 1.97 and the average family size was 2.58.

The median age in the town was 52 years. 13.6% of residents were under the age of 18; 4.2% were between the ages of 18 and 24; 12.7% were from 25 to 44; 49.2% were from 45 to 64; and 20.3% were 65 years of age or older. The gender makeup of the town was 52.5% male and 47.5% female.

=== 2000 census ===
As of the census of 2000, there were 157 people, 65 households, and 38 families residing in the town. The population density was 930.0 inhabitants per square mile (359.1/km^{2}). There were 87 housing units at an average density of 515.4 per square mile (199.0/km^{2}). The racial makeup of the town was 96.82% White, 1.91% Native American, and 1.27% from two or more races.

There were 65 households, out of which 32.3% had children under the age of 18 living with them, 55.4% were married couples living together, 1.5% had a female householder with no husband present, and 41.5% were non-families. 32.3% of all households were made up of individuals, and 20.0% had someone living alone who was 65 years of age or older. The average household size was 2.42 and the average family size was 3.21.

In the town, the population was spread out, with 27.4% under the age of 18, 5.1% from 18 to 24, 30.6% from 25 to 44, 18.5% from 45 to 64, and 18.5% who were 65 years of age or older. The median age was 41 years. For every 100 females there were 96.3 males. For every 100 females age 18 and over, there were 96.6 males.

The median income for a household in the town was $38,333, and the median income for a family was $45,417. Males had a median income of $32,000 versus $20,625 for females. The per capita income for the town was $16,525. About 9.1% of families and 10.8% of the population were below the poverty line, including 16.4% of those under the age of eighteen and none of those 65 or over.

== Climate ==
Hingham experiences a semi-arid climate (Köppen BSk) with long, cold, dry winters and hot summers.

Climate data for Gildford, Montana (1991–2020 normals, extremes 1958–present)
Month	Jan	Feb	Mar	Apr	May	Jun	Jul	Aug	Sep	Oct	Nov	Dec	Year
Record high °F (°C)	65 (18)	75 (24)	79 (26)	89 (32)	97 (36)	103 (39)	111 (44)	110 (43)	110 (43)	89 (32)	77 (25)	66 (19)	111 (44)
Mean maximum °F (°C)	51.5 (10.8)	54.1 (12.3)	65.4 (18.6)	77.7 (25.4)	86.1 (30.1)	91.7 (33.2)	98.3 (36.8)	98.2 (36.8)	90.6 (32.6)	78.7 (25.9)	63.4 (17.4)	52.6 (11.4)	100.0 (37.8)
Mean daily maximum °F (°C)	28.7 (−1.8)	32.3 (0.2)	43.2 (6.2)	55.7 (13.2)	66.0 (18.9)	73.9 (23.3)	83.8 (28.8)	82.4 (28.0)	70.7 (21.5)	55.8 (13.2)	41.0 (5.0)	31.2 (−0.4)	55.4 (13.0)
Daily mean °F (°C)	17.1 (−8.3)	20.3 (−6.5)	30.4 (−0.9)	41.8 (5.4)	51.7 (10.9)	59.8 (15.4)	67.1 (19.5)	65.6 (18.7)	55.3 (12.9)	42.1 (5.6)	29.0 (−1.7)	19.6 (−6.9)	41.7 (5.4)
Mean daily minimum °F (°C)	5.6 (−14.7)	8.2 (−13.2)	17.6 (−8.0)	28.0 (−2.2)	37.5 (3.1)	45.8 (7.7)	50.3 (10.2)	48.8 (9.3)	39.9 (4.4)	28.4 (−2.0)	17.0 (−8.3)	8.1 (−13.3)	27.9 (−2.3)
Mean minimum °F (°C)	−22.7 (−30.4)	−18.9 (−28.3)	−7.0 (−21.7)	13.7 (−10.2)	24.9 (−3.9)	35.5 (1.9)	42.2 (5.7)	37.8 (3.2)	26.7 (−2.9)	10.1 (−12.2)	−7.6 (−22.0)	−17.1 (−27.3)	−32.0 (−35.6)
Record low °F (°C)	−45 (−43)	−44 (−42)	−37 (−38)	−16 (−27)	11 (−12)	29 (−2)	36 (2)	29 (−2)	13 (−11)	−20 (−29)	−30 (−34)	−44 (−42)	−45 (−43)
Average precipitation inches (mm)	0.34 (8.6)	0.27 (6.9)	0.29 (7.4)	0.99 (25)	1.77 (45)	2.60 (66)	1.09 (28)	1.05 (27)	1.08 (27)	0.82 (21)	0.47 (12)	0.34 (8.6)	11.11 (282)
Average precipitation days (≥ 0.01 in)	3.6	2.6	3.2	5.2	7.7	9.3	4.9	5.2	5.0	4.7	3.5	3.0	57.9
Source: NOAA

== Government ==
Hingham has a mayor and town council. Incumbent mayor Thomas Peterson ran unopposed in November 2025.

== Education ==
North Star Public School educates students from kindergarten to grade 12. It includes the communities of Rudyard, Hingham, Gildford and Kremlin. In 2024 the schools had approximately 160 students.

== Transportation ==
Amtrak’s Empire Builder, which operates between Seattle/Portland and Chicago, passes through the town on BNSF tracks, but makes no stop. The nearest station is located in Havre, 35 miles (56 km) to the east.
