= Great Northern class S-2 =

Class of 13 American 4-8-4 Northern Type steam locomotives

Great Northern S-2 class
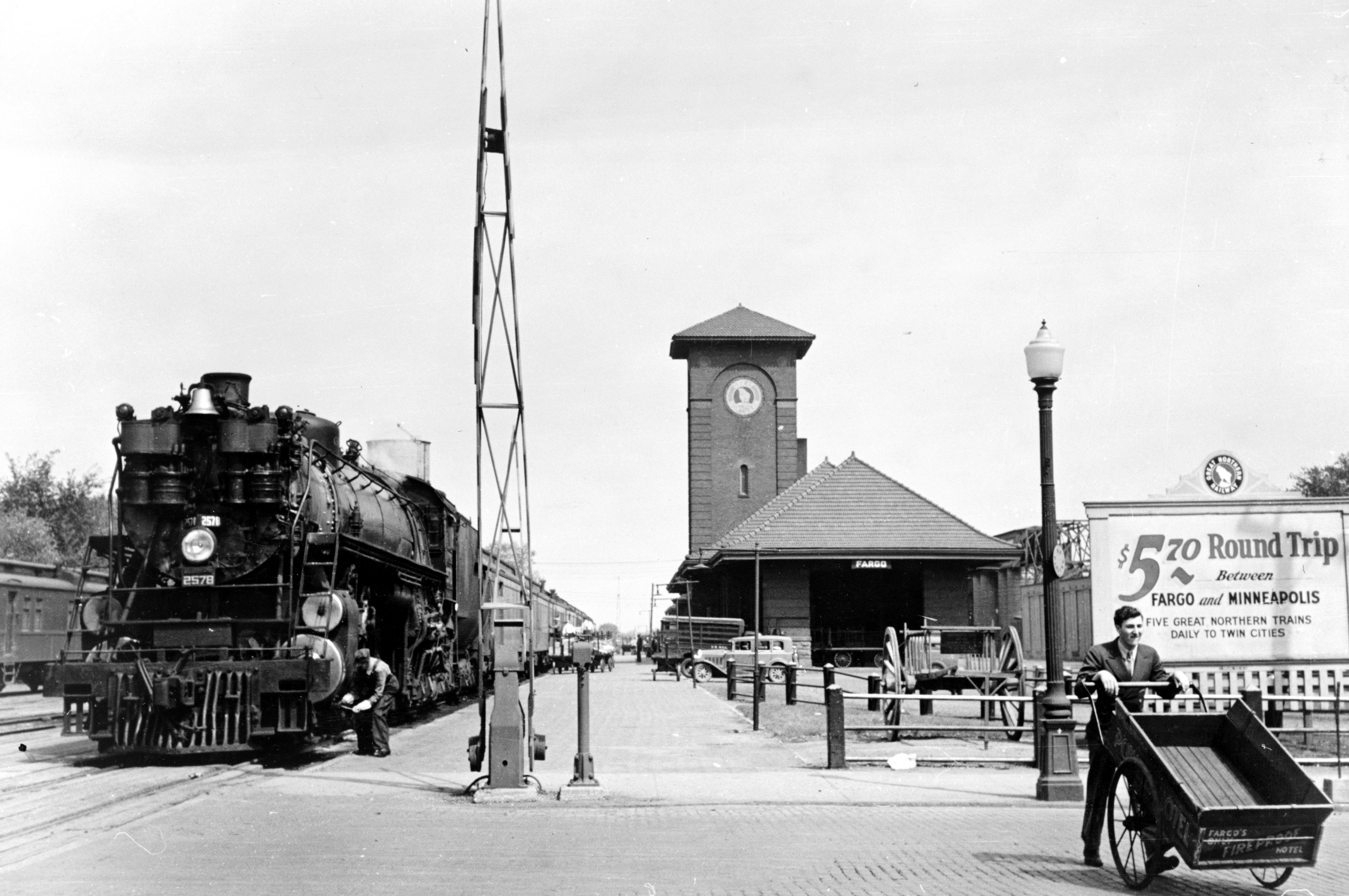
- GN 2578 with a train at Fargo, North Dakota in the summer of 1939.
Type and origin
- Power type: Steam
- Designer: William Kelly
- Builder: Baldwin Locomotive Works
- Serial number: 61211–61216, 61224, 61225, 61237–61242
- Model: Baldwin 16-52-2/4-E, (#1 to #14)
- Build date: February–March 1930
- Total produced: 14
Specifications
- Configuration
  - Whyte: 4-8-4
  - UIC: 2′D2′ h2
- Gauge: 4 ft 8 1/2 in (1,435 mm) standard gauge
- Leading dia.: 36 in (914 mm)
- Driver dia.: 80 in (2,032 mm)
- Trailing dia.: 46 in (1,168 mm)
- Tender wheels: 33 in (838 mm)
- Wheelbase: Loco & tender: 91.17 ft (27.79 m)
- Length: 103 ft 3 1/8 in (31.47 m)
- Width: 11 ft 0 3/4 in (3.37 m)
- Height: 16 ft 0 7/8 in (4.90 m)
- Axle load: 64,250 lb (29,140 kilograms; 29.14 metric tons)
- Adhesive weight: 257,000 lb (117,000 kilograms; 117 metric tons)
- Loco weight: 438,120 lb (198,730 kilograms; 198.73 metric tons)
- Tender weight: Working: 326,560 lb (148,130 kilograms; 148.13 metric tons); Empty: 136,300 lb (61,800 kilograms; 61.8 metric tons)
- Total weight: 764,680 lb (346,850 kilograms; 346.85 metric tons)
- Tender type: Vanderbilt, Water-bottom
- Fuel type: Fuel oil
- Fuel capacity: 5,800 US gal (22,000 L; 4,800 imp gal)
- Water cap.: 17,250 US gal (65,300 L; 14,360 imp gal)
- Firebox
  - Grate area: 97.75 sq ft (9.081 m^{2})
- Boiler: 94 in (2,400 mm)
- Boiler pressure: 225 lbf/in^{2} (1.55 MPa)
- Heating surface
  - Firebox: 401 sq ft (37.3 m^{2})
  - Tubes: 2.25 in (57 mm)
  - Flues: 3.5 in (89 mm)
  - Total surface: 4,781 sq ft (444.2 m^{2})
- Superheater
  - Type: Type E
  - Heating area: 2,265 sq ft (210.4 m^{2})
- Cylinders: Two
- Cylinder size: 29 in × 29 in (737 mm × 737 mm)
- Valve gear: Walschaert
- Valve type: Piston valves
Performance figures
- Maximum speed: At least 100 mph (160 km/h)
- Power output: 3,300 hp (2,500 kW)
- Tractive effort: 58,305 lbf (259.35 kN)
- Factor of adh.: 4.40
Career
- Operators: Great Northern
- Class: S-2
- Numbers: 2575–2588
- Delivered: March 11-April 10, 1930
- Retired: 1955-1958
- Preserved: One preserved (No. 2584), plus tender from No. 2575 preserved
- Disposition: Great Northern 2584 on display in Havre, Montana, tender from No. 2575 used as auxiliary tender for SP&S 700, remainder scrapped

The Great Northern S-2 was a class of 14 4-8-4 "Northern" type steam locomotives built by the Baldwin Locomotive Works in 1930 and operated by the Great Northern Railway until the late 1950s.

The locomotives were built to haul passengers on the GN mainline, pulling the Empire Builder and the Oriental Limited and were assigned to the Montana division for service between Williston, North Dakota and Havre, Montana and the Spokane division for service between Spokane, Washington and Wenatchee, Washington, then assigned to the Divide between Havre and Whitefish, Montana, of which mostly runs through the famed Marias Pass, though they were also used on GN tracks outside of their assigned areas.

Today, only one S-2 survives, No. 2584. It was retired in December 1957 and moved to the Havre depot in Havre, Montana in May 1964 where it still resides today.

== History ==
=== Design ===
Intended for fast passenger service, the S-2s were built lighter and with larger driving wheels than the earlier S-1 Class of "Northerns" of 1929. Like the P-2 Class of "Mountains" of 1923, the design of the S-2 Class 4-8-4 was somewhat different from the traditional steam locomotive design on the Great Northern. The GN normally preferred to equip its engines with a Belpaire type boiler, but in an effort to reduce weight, the S-2s were delivered with a radial stay boiler, nickel steel boiler plates and cast steel cylinders. The boiler was also fitted with a Sellers exhaust steam injector, which can process 4,500 US gal (17,000 L; 3,700 imp gal) to 7,350 US gal (27,800 L; 6,120 imp gal) gallons of water per hour. The S-2 came with a Vanderbilt type tender, which provided a capacity of 17,250 gallons of water and 5,800 gallons of oil. It was unique in being the only all-welded tender on the GN. This water-bottom tender had a Commonwealth cast-steel frame and rode on two 6-wheel cast steel trucks.

The locomotives were fast but slippery when starting heavier trains. They were also the first class of 4-8-4 Northerns to be built with 80 inch driving wheels. They also proved to be reliable, as a single S-2 can haul up to 18 conventional steel passenger cars on westbound passenger runs, with helper service only necessary between Walton and Summit on eastbound runs should trains exceed 11 cars. It is a distance of 18 miles where the grade is 1.8%.

In addition to being fast, they were also economical in fuel consumption and maintenance expenses and had an exceptionally high availability for service. Such positives had led the class to being excellent performers. An S-2 can make the 512 mile round trip from Whitefish to Havre and back with only minor work at Havre, such as refueling and greasing. However, it was not unusual for an S-2 to run the 566 mile distance from Whitefish to Williston, North Dakota and have the locomotive detach from its train at Havre only for refueling. On flat, straight track, an S-2 is capable of hauling 18 heavy steel Pullmans at 80 mph (130 km/h). Their power and speed allowed them to make up nearly an hour with an all-steel passenger train on the Montana division and Spokane division.

All S-2s were delivered in the "Glacier Park" paint scheme except for No. 2577, which carried a coat of light grey or aluminum paint on the boiler and cylinder jackets at delivery, most likely for photographic purposes. It was eventually repainted to Glacier Park, matching the rest of the class. All engines came with chrome plated cylinder covers and steam chest heads and by the 1950s, all engines had received the more economical all-black paint scheme. The only major rebuilding of the class was the replacement of the original bearings with Timken roller bearings on every axle in 1945. Some engines were temporarily converted to burn coal for a period in the late 1930s, with the tender having a capacity of 24 tons of coal. Vestibule cabs were added to engine 2577 in the early 1930s and engines 2582, 2586, 2587 and 2588 by the late 1940s.

=== Revenue service ===
The S-2s spent most of their career pulling the Great Northern's passenger trains, such as the Empire Builder and the Oriental Limited between St. Paul and Seattle (Chicago-St. Paul portion uses Chicago, Burlington & Quincy's mainline), but have also pulled fast mail trains. They have also traversed over the famed Marias Pass. As a result of their speed and high availability for service, they proved to be reliable locomotives, running up to approximately 20,000 miles (32,000 km) a month. Initially, nine were assigned to the Montana division for service between Williston, North Dakota and Havre, Montana, and five were assigned to the Spokane division for service between Spokane, Washington and Wenatchee, Washington due to both divisions having long tangents, easy curves and light grades, then in 1931, they were tested in pulling the Empire Builder over the Divide between Havre and Whitefish, Montana. The test was a success and all of the S-2s were also assigned to pull the Empire Builder over the Divide, replacing the S-1s in passenger service over the Divide and putting them in freight service.

By 1949, the Great Northern had dieselised its premier passenger trains and the S-2s were then reassigned to secondary passenger runs and freight service, of which the latter service proved to be rather unsuitable for them due to their passenger locomotive design. Retirement started on August 25, 1955 and engines 2577 and 2584 made their last revenue runs in 1956 before being retired a year later. By April 1958, all of the S-2s have been retired.

=== Accidents and incidents ===
- On August 9, 1945, No. 2588, while pulling the second section of the westbound Empire Builder, rear-ended the first section of the westbound Empire Builder pulled by No. 2584, which had stopped at Michigan, ND due to a hot box on the tender. This was the worst train accident in North Dakota and on the Great Northern. 2584 had its hot box resolved and 2588 was repaired after the wreck and both were returned to service.
- On January 9, 1947, No. 2581 suffered a boiler explosion due to low water level at Crary, ND. The locomotive was later scrapped following the incident.

== Preservation ==
Only one S-2 survived into preservation today, No. 2584. It made its final run in late 1956 and it was stored in a roundhouse in Superior, Wisconsin. It was then retired in December 1957 and on March 21, 1958, the Great Northern had decided to hold it for historical purposes and it was eventually repainted to its original Glacier Park paint scheme. On May 15, 1964, it was put on display at the Havre depot in Havre, Montana and was dedicated there. Today, it is still on display there. It also has a marker describing the locomotive and the S-2 class in general on the engineer's side of the locomotive's tender. It is the sole surviving Great Northern "Northern" type and the largest surviving Great Northern steam locomotive.

The tender from S-2 No. 2575 also survives, it is currently used as an auxiliary tender for Spokane, Portland and Seattle 700.

== Roster ==
Number	Baldwin serial number	Date built	Disposition	Notes
2575	61211	February 1930	Sold for scrap August 25, 1955 but the tender survives and is used as an auxiliary tender for Spokane, Portland and Seattle 700.	First 4-8-4 "Northern" to be built with 80" driving wheels.
2576	61212	February 1930	Sold for scrap April 19, 1956.	
2577	61213	February 1930	Retired December 1957, scrapped 1963.	Painted light grey on the boiler and cylinder jackets at delivery upon delivery, eventually repainted to Glacier Park. Received Vestibule cab in the early 1930s.
2578	61214	February 1930	Sold for scrap April 19, 1956.	
2579	61215	February 1930	Retired December 1957, scrapped 1963.	
2580	61216	February 1930	Retired April 1958, scrapped 1963.	
2581	61224	February 1930	Boiler exploded January 9, 1947; not repaired, scrapped February 4, 1947.	
2582	61225	February 1930	Sold for scrap August 25, 1955.	Received Vestibule cab by the late 1940s.
2583	61237	March 1930	Retired December 1957, scrapped 1963.	
2584	61238	March 1930	Retired December 1957, held for historical purposes March 21, 1958, moved to the Havre depot May 15, 1964 for display and currently resides there.	Repainted Glacier Park scheme before display. Sole surviving GN S-2, sole surviving GN "Northern" and largest surviving GN steam locomotive.
2585	61239	March 1930	Sold for scrap October 7, 1955.	
2586	61240	March 1930	Retired April 1958, scrapped 1963.	Received Vestibule cab in the 1930s.
2587	61241	March 1930	Sold for scrap October 7, 1955.	Received Vestibule cab by the late 1940s.
2588	61242	March 1930	Sold for scrap April 19, 1956.	Received Vestibule cab in the 1930s.

== See also ==
- Great Northern P-2
- Great Northern S-1
