= Mabel Lapacó =

Argentine modernist architect

- Born: 1930
- Died: January 22, 2016; Buenos Aires
- Education: University of Buenos Aires
- Spouse: Osvaldo Bidinost

Mabel "Lula" Lapacó (1930–2016) was an Argentine modernist architect known for her Brutalist buildings.

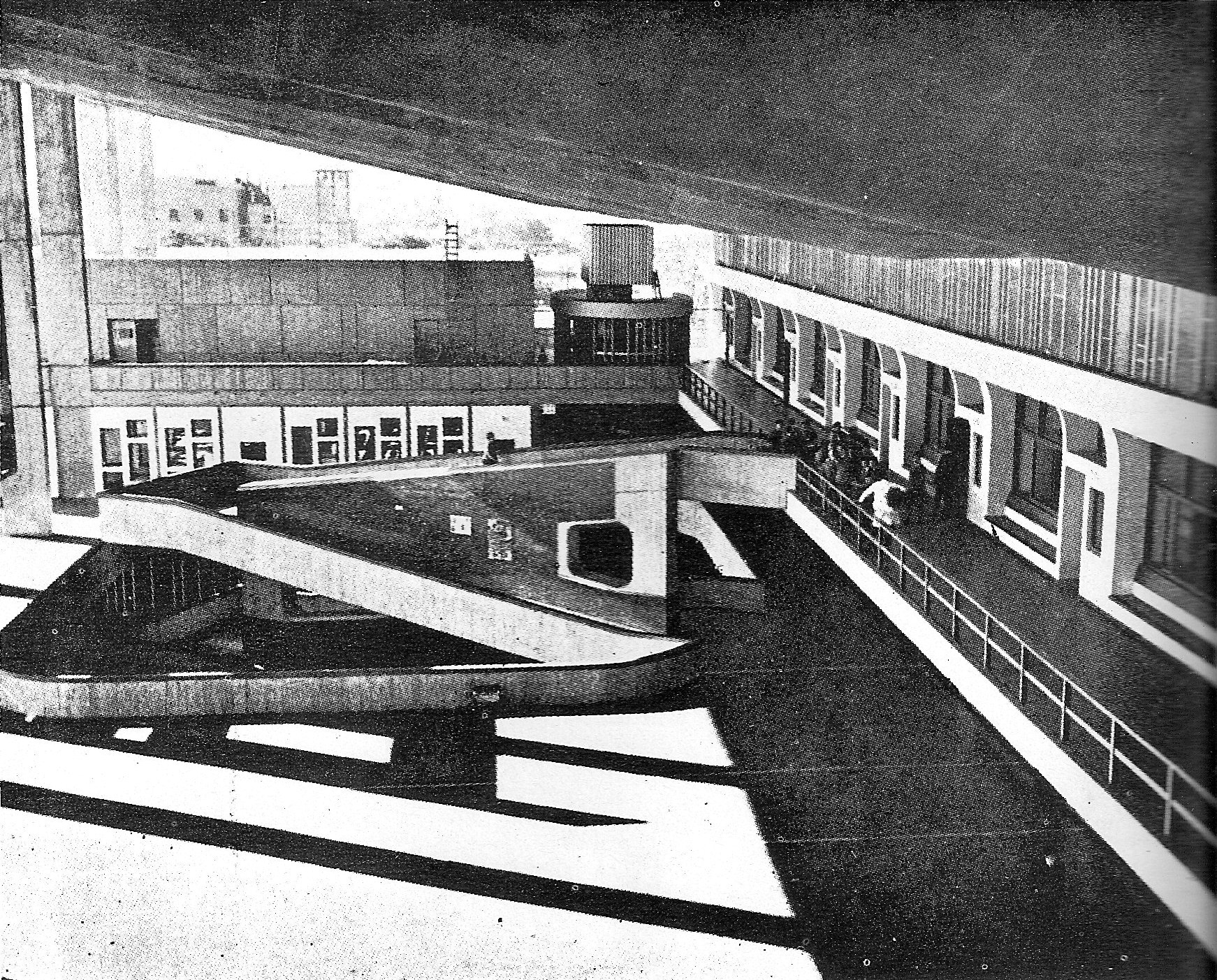
Escuela Superior de Comercio Manuel Belgrano (1959)

Lapacó studied architecture at the University of Buenos Aires. At the school she met Osvaldo Bidinost, who later became her husband and occupational partner.

Mabel Lapacó died on January 22, 2016, in Buenos Aires.

== Work ==
- Escuela Superior de Comercio Manuel Belgrano (1959), Córdoba
- Casa Lapacó (1961), Tres Cruces
- Casa Goldstein (1967), Pinamar
