= Rudyard, Montana =

- Census-designated place
- Location of Rudyard, Montana
- Coordinates: 48°33′36″N 110°33′00″W
- Country: United States
- State: Montana
- County: Hill

Area
  - Total: 0.92 sq mi (2.37 km^{2})
  - Land: 0.92 sq mi (2.37 km^{2})
  - Water: 0 sq mi (0.00 km^{2})
- Elevation: 3,110 ft (950 m)

Population (2020)
  - Total: 270
  - Density: 294.7/sq mi (113.77/km^{2})
- Time zone: UTC-7 (Mountain (MST))
  - Summer (DST): UTC-6 (MDT)
- ZIP code: 59540
- Area code: 406
- FIPS code: 30-64900
- GNIS feature ID: 2409223

Rudyard is an unincorporated community and census-designated place (CDP) in Hill County, Montana, United States. As of the 2020 census, Rudyard had a population of 270.

The community was established as a switching station on the Great Northern Railway. The post office opened in 1910. It is named after author Rudyard Kipling.

== Geography ==
Rudyard is located western Hill County. U.S. Route 2 runs along the southern edge of the community, leading east 41 miles (66 km) to Havre, the county seat, and west 62 miles (100 km) to Shelby.

According to the United States Census Bureau, the CDP has a total area of 0.93 square miles (2.4 km^{2}), all land.

=== Antipodes ===
Rudyard has the distinction of being the only community in the contiguous United States with a non-oceanic antipode, that being one of the Kerguelen Islands.

=== Climate ===
Climate data for Rudyard 19S, Montana, 1991–2020 normals, 2003-2020 snowfall: 2878ft (877m)
Month	Jan	Feb	Mar	Apr	May	Jun	Jul	Aug	Sep	Oct	Nov	Dec	Year
Record high °F (°C)	64 (18)	68 (20)	79 (26)	90 (32)	91 (33)	100 (38)	106 (41)	104 (40)	98 (37)	90 (32)	75 (24)	62 (17)	106 (41)
Mean maximum °F (°C)	52.5 (11.4)	52.4 (11.3)	63.6 (17.6)	78.6 (25.9)	84.4 (29.1)	90.5 (32.5)	98.2 (36.8)	96.9 (36.1)	90.5 (32.5)	78.6 (25.9)	65.0 (18.3)	53.7 (12.1)	99.6 (37.6)
Mean daily maximum °F (°C)	26.1 (−3.3)	31.3 (−0.4)	42.2 (5.7)	54.1 (12.3)	63.4 (17.4)	71.7 (22.1)	82.4 (28.0)	80.8 (27.1)	69.5 (20.8)	54.5 (12.5)	40.2 (4.6)	30.2 (−1.0)	53.9 (12.2)
Daily mean °F (°C)	14.9 (−9.5)	19.1 (−7.2)	29.1 (−1.6)	40.4 (4.7)	49.9 (9.9)	58.6 (14.8)	67.0 (19.4)	65.1 (18.4)	54.8 (12.7)	41.2 (5.1)	28.6 (−1.9)	18.8 (−7.3)	40.6 (4.8)
Mean daily minimum °F (°C)	3.8 (−15.7)	6.9 (−13.9)	16.0 (−8.9)	26.7 (−2.9)	36.4 (2.4)	45.4 (7.4)	51.6 (10.9)	49.4 (9.7)	40.0 (4.4)	28.0 (−2.2)	16.9 (−8.4)	7.5 (−13.6)	27.4 (−2.6)
Mean minimum °F (°C)	−22.8 (−30.4)	−19.9 (−28.8)	−6.0 (−21.1)	13.7 (−10.2)	24.4 (−4.2)	37.0 (2.8)	43.3 (6.3)	39.9 (4.4)	29.8 (−1.2)	13.6 (−10.2)	−4.5 (−20.3)	−17.9 (−27.7)	−32.0 (−35.6)
Record low °F (°C)	−41 (−41)	−40 (−40)	−36 (−38)	−8 (−22)	14 (−10)	32 (0)	37 (3)	34 (1)	20 (−7)	−12 (−24)	−24 (−31)	−41 (−41)	−41 (−41)
Average precipitation inches (mm)	0.42 (11)	0.32 (8.1)	0.43 (11)	1.15 (29)	1.77 (45)	2.57 (65)	1.24 (31)	1.15 (29)	1.11 (28)	0.83 (21)	0.53 (13)	0.38 (9.7)	11.9 (300.8)
Average snowfall inches (cm)	5.6 (14)	3.9 (9.9)	3.1 (7.9)	2.8 (7.1)	1.0 (2.5)	0.0 (0.0)	0.0 (0.0)	0.0 (0.0)	1.3 (3.3)	2.0 (5.1)	3.1 (7.9)	4.5 (11)	27.3 (68.7)
Source 1: NOAA
Source 2: XMACIS (snowfall, temp records & monthly max/mins)

Climate data for Rudyard 21 N, Montana, 1991–2020 normals, 2001-2020 snowfall: 3000ft (914m)
Month	Jan	Feb	Mar	Apr	May	Jun	Jul	Aug	Sep	Oct	Nov	Dec	Year
Record high °F (°C)	66 (19)	68 (20)	79 (26)	87 (31)	92 (33)	98 (37)	103 (39)	104 (40)	96 (36)	83 (28)	76 (24)	62 (17)	104 (40)
Mean maximum °F (°C)	54.5 (12.5)	53.2 (11.8)	64.8 (18.2)	77.0 (25.0)	85.1 (29.5)	90.9 (32.7)	97.5 (36.4)	96.6 (35.9)	91.4 (33.0)	77.1 (25.1)	64.5 (18.1)	53.1 (11.7)	97.1 (36.2)
Mean daily maximum °F (°C)	30.0 (−1.1)	32.9 (0.5)	42.9 (6.1)	55.5 (13.1)	66.1 (18.9)	73.1 (22.8)	82.9 (28.3)	82.8 (28.2)	71.3 (21.8)	56.3 (13.5)	40.5 (4.7)	32.4 (0.2)	55.6 (13.1)
Daily mean °F (°C)	17.3 (−8.2)	20.2 (−6.6)	29.7 (−1.3)	40.9 (4.9)	51.0 (10.6)	58.6 (14.8)	65.8 (18.8)	64.6 (18.1)	54.9 (12.7)	41.5 (5.3)	28.0 (−2.2)	19.6 (−6.9)	41.0 (5.0)
Mean daily minimum °F (°C)	4.6 (−15.2)	7.5 (−13.6)	16.4 (−8.7)	26.3 (−3.2)	35.8 (2.1)	44.2 (6.8)	48.6 (9.2)	46.4 (8.0)	38.5 (3.6)	26.6 (−3.0)	15.5 (−9.2)	6.8 (−14.0)	26.4 (−3.1)
Mean minimum °F (°C)	−24.3 (−31.3)	−21.0 (−29.4)	−7.3 (−21.8)	11.0 (−11.7)	22.3 (−5.4)	34.6 (1.4)	39.2 (4.0)	35.8 (2.1)	26.3 (−3.2)	7.1 (−13.8)	−9.2 (−22.9)	−20.2 (−29.0)	−33.3 (−36.3)
Record low °F (°C)	−38 (−39)	−38 (−39)	−33 (−36)	−15 (−26)	10 (−12)	29 (−2)	36 (2)	28 (−2)	19 (−7)	−12 (−24)	−32 (−36)	−45 (−43)	−45 (−43)
Average precipitation inches (mm)	0.30 (7.6)	0.35 (8.9)	0.41 (10)	0.94 (24)	1.81 (46)	2.37 (60)	1.34 (34)	1.07 (27)	1.12 (28)	0.78 (20)	0.50 (13)	0.35 (8.9)	11.34 (287.4)
Average snowfall inches (cm)	5.6 (14)	6.3 (16)	4.8 (12)	3.5 (8.9)	1.8 (4.6)	0.0 (0.0)	0.0 (0.0)	0.0 (0.0)	1.7 (4.3)	3.2 (8.1)	5.9 (15)	5.2 (13)	38 (95.9)
Source 1: NOAA
Source 2: XMACIS (snowfall, temp records & monthly max/mins)

== Demographics ==
Historical population
Census	Pop.	Note	%±
2000	275		—
2020	270		—
U.S. Decennial Census

As of the census of 2000, there were 275 people, 126 households, and 71 families residing in the CDP. The population density was 295.8 inhabitants per square mile (114.2/km^{2}). There were 155 housing units at an average density of 166.7 per square mile (64.4/km^{2}). The racial makeup of the CDP was 98.18% White, 0.73% Native American, and 1.09% from two or more races. Hispanic or Latino of any race were 0.36% of the population.

There were 126 households, out of which 27.0% had children under the age of 18 living with them, 45.2% were married couples living together, 7.1% had a female householder with no husband present, and 42.9% were non-families. 38.9% of all households were made up of individuals, and 20.6% had someone living alone who was 65 years of age or older. The average household size was 2.18 and the average family size was 2.94.

In the CDP, the population was spread out, with 25.8% under the age of 18, 2.9% from 18 to 24, 25.5% from 25 to 44, 26.2% from 45 to 64, and 19.6% who were 65 years of age or older. The median age was 43 years. For every 100 females, there were 100.7 males. For every 100 females age 18 and over, there were 94.3 males.

The median income for a household in the CDP was $28,393, and the median income for a family was $34,844. Males had a median income of $25,694 versus $15,833 for females. The per capita income for the CDP was $16,889. About 7.2% of families and 9.9% of the population were below the poverty line, including 12.9% of those under the age of 18 and none of those 65 or over.

== Transportation ==
Amtrak’s Empire Builder, which operates between Seattle/Portland and Chicago, passes through the town on BNSF tracks, but makes no stop. The nearest station is located in Havre, 41 miles (66 km) to the east.

== Education ==
North Star Public School educates students from kindergarten to grade 12. It includes the communities of Rudyard, Hingham, Gildford and Kremlin. In 2024 the schools had approximately 160 students.

North Star High School and middle school are located in Rudyard. They are known as the Knights. North Star Elementary school is located in Gildford.
