= Lloyd Burdick =

American football player (1909–1945)

No. 14
- Position: Tackle

Personal information
- Born: August 8, 1909; Assumption, Illinois, U.S.
- Died: August 9, 1945 (aged 36); Michigan, North Dakota, U.S.
- Listed height: 6 ft 4 in (1.93 m)
- Listed weight: 248 lb (112 kg)

Career information
- High school: Morgan Park (Chicago, Illinois)
- College: Illinois

Career history

Playing
- Chicago Bears (1931–1932); Cincinnati Reds (1933); Portsmouth Spartans (1934)*
- * Offseason or practice squad member only

Coaching
- Knox (IL) (1934)

Awards and highlights
- NFL champion (1932); National champion (1927)
- Stats at Pro Football Reference

Lloyd Sumner "Shorty" Burdick (August 8, 1909 – August 9, 1945) was an American professional football tackle who played three seasons in the National Football League (NFL) with the Chicago Bears and Cincinnati Reds. He played college football at the University of Illinois.

== Early life ==
Burdick attended Morgan Park Military Academy in Chicago, Illinois.

== College career ==
Burdick played football for the Illinois Fighting Illini. He graduated from the school of commerce and agriculture at the University of Illinois. He also participated in wrestling for the Illini. In 1930, Burdick was the Big Ten heavyweight champion and finished second in the NCAA tournament.

== Professional football career ==
Burdick played in 22 games, starting nineteen, for the Chicago Bears from 1931 to 1932.

Burdick played in ten games, starting nine, for the Cincinnati Reds in 1933. In late December 1933, the Reds traded him to the Portsmouth Spartans for four players. However, he decided to retire from football.

== Boxing and wrestling ==
Burdick also spent time as a boxer and professional wrestler.

== Personal life ==
Burdick was a district representative of the Caterpillar company. His Caterpillar company territory included North Dakota, Montana, and the provinces of Alberta and Saskatchewan, Canada. He spent 28 months as supervisor of maintenance on the Alcan highway. Burdick was one of 34 people killed in a train wreck on August 9, 1945, in Michigan, North Dakota.

== Head coaching record ==
Year	Team	Overall	Conference	Standing	Bowl/playoffs
Knox Old Siwash (Illinois Intercollegiate Athletic Conference / Midwest Conference) (1934)
1934	Knox	0–8	0–5 / 0–4	18th / 8th	
Knox:		0–8			
Total:		0–8			

== See also ==
- List of gridiron football players who became professional wrestlers
