= Kremlin, Montana =

- Census-designated place
- Location of Kremlin, Montana
- Coordinates: 48°34′14″N 110°05′10″W
- Country: United States
- State: Montana
- County: Hill

Area
  - Total: 0.44 sq mi (1.14 km^{2})
  - Land: 0.44 sq mi (1.14 km^{2})
  - Water: 0 sq mi (0.00 km^{2})
- Elevation: 2,854 ft (870 m)

Population (2020)
  - Total: 78
  - Density: 176.9/sq mi (68.29/km^{2})
- Time zone: UTC-7 (Mountain (MST))
  - Summer (DST): UTC-6 (MDT)
- ZIP code: 59532
- Area code: 406
- FIPS code: 30-41725
- GNIS feature ID: 2408498

Kremlin is an unincorporated community and census-designated place (CDP) in Hill County, Montana, United States. As of the 2020 census, Kremlin had a population of 78.

== History ==
Kremlin was developed as a cattle-rangeland stop on the Great Northern Railway. It received its first large group of homesteaders in 1910, many of them Russian.

== Geography ==
Kremlin is located in central Hill County along U.S. Route 2, which forms the southern edge of the CDP. US 2 leads east 19 miles (31 km) to Havre, the county seat, and west 84 miles (135 km) to Shelby.

According to the United States Census Bureau, the Kremlin CDP has a total area of 0.44 square miles (1.14 km^{2}), all land.

== Demographics ==
Historical population
Census	Pop.	Note	%±
2000	126		—
2010	98		−22.2%
2020	78		−20.4%
U.S. Decennial Census

As of the census of 2000, there were 126 people, 47 households, and 35 families residing in the CDP. The population density was 277.8 inhabitants per square mile (107.3/km^{2}). There were 57 housing units at an average density of 125.7 per square mile (48.5/km^{2}). The racial makeup of the CDP was 99.21% White, and 0.79% from two or more races. Hispanic or Latino of any race were 2.38% of the population.

There were 47 households, out of which 36.2% had children under the age of 18 living with them, 66.0% were married couples living together, 6.4% had a female householder with no husband present, and 25.5% were non-families. 23.4% of all households were made up of individuals, and 10.6% had someone living alone who was 65 years of age or older. The average household size was 2.68 and the average family size was 3.20.

In the CDP, the population was spread out, with 29.4% under the age of 18, 9.5% from 18 to 24, 23.0% from 25 to 44, 22.2% from 45 to 64, and 15.9% who were 65 years of age or older. The median age was 37 years. For every 100 females, there were 110.0 males. For every 100 females age 18 and over, there were 107.0 males.

The median income for a household in the CDP was $36,250, and the median income for a family was $45,250. Males had a median income of $40,625 versus $21,250 for females. The per capita income for the CDP was $12,598. There were 13.5% of families and 22.8% of the population living below the poverty line, including 27.9% of under eighteens and 33.3% of those over 64.

== Climate ==
According to the Köppen Climate Classification system, Kremlin has a semi-arid climate, abbreviated "BSk" on climate maps.

== Education ==
North Star Public School educates students from kindergarten to grade 12. It includes the communities of Kremlin, Rudyard, Hingham, and Gildford. In 2024 the schools had approximately 160 students.

== Transportation ==
Amtrak’s Empire Builder, which operates between Seattle/Portland and Chicago, passes through the town on BNSF tracks, but makes no stop. The nearest station is located in Havre, 19 miles (31 km) to the east.
