= Great Northern 2584 =

Retired American steam locomotive

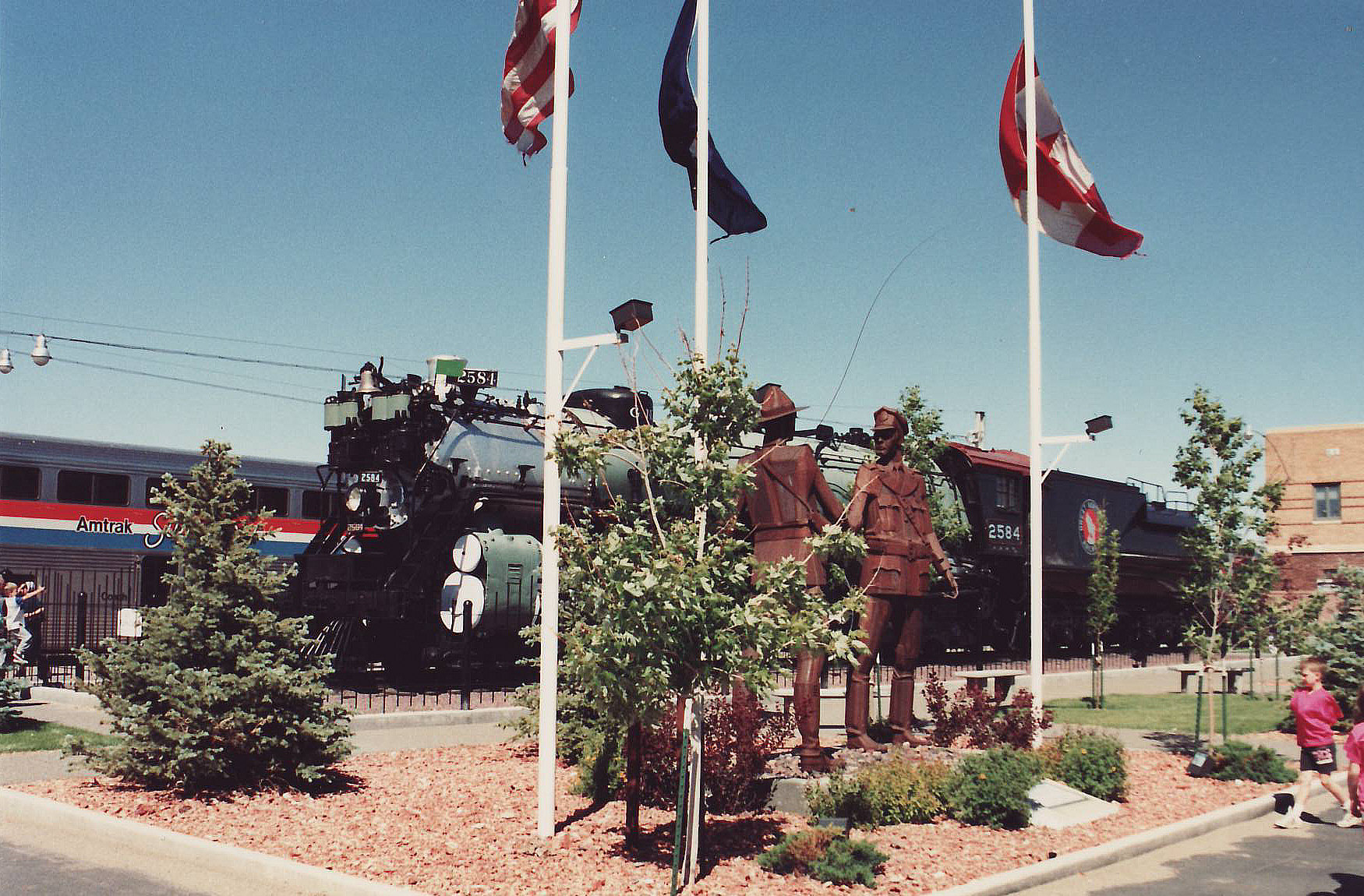
- GN 2584 and nearby sculpture, U.S.–Canada Friendship in Havre, Montana in 1991
Type and origin
- Power type: Steam
- Designer: William Kelly
- Builder: Baldwin Locomotive Works
- Serial number: 61238
- Model: Baldwin 16-52-2/4-E, (#10)
- Build date: March 1930
Specifications
- Configuration
  - Whyte: 4-8-4
  - UIC: 2′D2′ h2
- Gauge: 4 ft 8 1/2 in (1,435 mm) standard gauge
- Leading dia.: 36 in (914 mm)
- Driver dia.: 80 in (2,032 mm)
- Trailing dia.: 45 in (1,143 mm)
- Tender wheels: 33 in (838 mm)
- Wheelbase: Loco & tender: 91.17 ft (27.79 m)
- Length: 103 ft 3 1/8 in (31.47 m)
- Width: 11 ft 0 3/4 in (3.37 m)
- Height: 16 ft 0 7/8 in (4.90 m)
- Axle load: 64,250 lb (29,140 kilograms; 29.14 metric tons)
- Adhesive weight: 257,000 lb (117,000 kilograms; 117 metric tons)
- Loco weight: 438,120 lb (198,730 kilograms; 198.73 metric tons)
- Tender weight: Working: 326,560 lb (148,130 kilograms; 148.13 metric tons); Empty: 136,300 lb (61,800 kilograms; 61.8 metric tons)
- Total weight: 764,680 lb (346,850 kilograms; 346.85 metric tons)
- Tender type: Vanderbilt, Water-bottom
- Fuel type: Fuel oil
- Fuel capacity: 5,800 US gal (22,000 L; 4,800 imp gal)
- Water cap.: 17,250 US gal (65,300 L; 14,360 imp gal)
- Firebox
  - Grate area: 97.75 sq ft (9.081 m^{2})
- Boiler: 96 in (2,438 mm)
- Boiler pressure: 225 lbf/in^{2} (1.55 MPa)
- Heating surface
  - Firebox: 401 sq ft (37.3 m^{2})
  - Tubes: 2.25 in (57 mm)
  - Flues: 3.5 in (89 mm)
  - Total surface: 4,781 sq ft (444.2 m^{2})
- Superheater
  - Type: Type E
  - Heating area: 2,265 sq ft (210.4 m^{2})
- Cylinders: Two, outside
- Cylinder size: 29 in × 29 in (737 mm × 737 mm)
- Valve gear: Walschaerts
- Valve type: Piston valves
- Loco brake: Air
- Train brakes: Air
- Couplers: Knuckle
Performance figures
- Maximum speed: At least 100 mph (160 km/h)
- Power output: 3,300 hp (2,500 kW)
- Tractive effort: 58,305 lbf (259.35 kN)
- Factor of adh.: 4.40
Career
- Operators: Great Northern
- Class: S-2
- Number in class: 10 of 14
- Numbers: GN 2584
- Delivered: April 1930
- Last run: Late 1956
- Retired: December 1957
- Current owner: Burlington Northern Santa Fe
- Disposition: On display at the Havre depot in Havre, Montana
- Note the Side view Elevation drawings were published in the 1938 Locomotive Cyclopedia by Simmons Boardman Publishing and her final fireman was Henry Norton

Great Northern 2584 is a 4-8-4 "Northern" type steam locomotive built by the Baldwin Locomotive Works in Philadelphia, Pennsylvania in March 1930 for the Great Northern Railway (GN) as a member of the S-2 class.

The locomotive was built for fast passenger service and was assigned to pull the Great Northern's mainline passenger trains such as the Empire Builder and Oriental Limited. It was then retired in December 1957 and put on display at the Havre station in Havre, Montana for display in May 1964. It is the sole surviving Great Northern S-2 Class "Northern", the sole surviving Great Northern "Northern" type and the largest surviving Great Northern steam locomotive.

== Service history ==
When delivered to the Great Northern in April 1930, No. 2584 was assigned to the railroad's premier passenger trains such as the Empire Builder and Oriental Limited between St. Paul, Minnesota and Seattle, Washington as well as fast mail trains. Initially, the locomotive was assigned to the flatter districts due to the districts having long tangents, easy curves and light grades, then a test in 1931 proved the class was capable of pulling the Empire Builder over the Divide between Havre and Whitefish, Montana where grades are up to 1.8% and the locomotive was also assigned to the Divide and eventually as far east as St. Paul, Minnesota, where the Empire Builder starts on the Great Northern's mainline. In 1945, the locomotive was fitted with Timken roller bearings on every axle, including every axle on its tender, replacing its original plain bearings. By 1949, despite performing excellently in passenger service, the railroad had dieselised its premier passenger trains and the locomotive was then reassigned to secondary passenger trains and freight service, of which the latter service was proven to be rather unsuitable for it due to being designed as a passenger locomotive. By the 1950s, No. 2584 and her sister locomotives were repainted from their original Glacier Green to black.

In late 1956, 2584 made its final run and was stored in a roundhouse in Superior, Wisconsin, had its axle boxes painted red and sat there for years.

== Accident ==
On August 9, 1945, No. 2584 was involved in a wreck, however, the locomotive was undamaged, as the rear of its train was rear-ended by sister locomotive No. 2588 at 45 mph. No. 2584's tender, however, had suffered from a hot box and had stopped at Petersburg, North Dakota and again at Michigan, North Dakota prior to the wreck. After the hot box and accident were resolved, both 2584 and 2588 were returned to service.

== Preservation ==
2584 was retired in December 1957 and on March 21, 1958, the Great Northern had decided to hold it for historical purposes and it was eventually repainted to its original "Glacier Park" paint scheme and today is owned by Great Northern's eventual successor, BNSF. On May 15, 1964, the locomotive was put on display at the Havre depot in Havre, Montana and was dedicated there. As of today, it still resides there on display. It also has a marker describing the locomotive and the S-2 class in general on the engineer's side of the locomotive's tender.
