= Great Northern class S-1 =

Class of 6 American 4-8-4 Northern Type steam locomotives

Great Northern S-1 class
Type and origin
- Power type: Steam
- Builder: Baldwin Locomotive Works
- Serial number: 60781–60782, 60807–60810
- Model: Baldwin 16-50-2/4-E, (#1 to #6)
- Build date: April–May, 1929
- Total produced: 6
Specifications
- Configuration
  - Whyte: 4-8-4
  - UIC: 2′D2′ h2
- Gauge: 4 ft 8 1/2 in (1,435 mm) standard gauge
- Driver dia.: 73 in (1,854 mm)
- Wheelbase: 94.90 ft (28,926 mm)
- Axle load: 67,000 lb (30,000 kilograms; 30 metric tons)
- Adhesive weight: 270,600 lb (122,700 kg; 122.7 t)
- Loco weight: 470,120 lb (213,240 kg; 213.24 t)
- Tender weight: 375,780 lb (170,450 kg; 170.45 t)
- Total weight: 847,900 lb (384,600 kg; 384.6 t)
- Tender type: Vanderbilt
- Fuel type: Fuel oil
- Fuel capacity: 5,800 US gal (22,000 L; 4,800 imp gal) oil
- Water cap.: 22,000 US gal (83,000 L; 18,000 imp gal)
- Firebox
  - Grate area: 102 sq ft (9.5 m^{2})
- Boiler: 98 in (2,500 mm)
- Boiler pressure: 250 lbf/in^{2} (1.72 MPa)
- Heating surface
  - Firebox: 401 sq ft (37.3 m^{2})
  - Total surface: tubearea =
- Cylinders: Two
- Cylinder size: 28 in × 30 in (711 mm × 762 mm)
- Valve gear: Walschaert
Performance figures
- Power output: 3,600 hp (2,700 kW)
- Tractive effort: 68,470 lbf (304.57 kN)
- Factor of adh.: 4.00
Career
- Operators: Great Northern
- Class: S-1
- Numbers: 2550–2555
- Retired: 1956-1958
- Disposition: All scrapped
- Total engine weight: 472,000 lb (214,000 kg; 214 t)

The Great Northern S-1 was a class of 6 4-8-4 Northern type steam locomotives built by the Baldwin Locomotive Works in 1929 and operated by the Great Northern Railway until the late 1950s. They were initially put in passenger service but eventually saw service pulling freight.

== History ==
=== Design ===
Initially intended for passenger pulling, the S-1s eventually found their way into pulling freight trains. The S-1 is capable of pulling 18 conventional steel passenger cars westbound and 13 cars eastbound, and 14 cars if the weather is favorable. Should passenger trains exceed such a number of cars eastbound, helper service is added between Walton and Summit. With the help of a pusher, they can pull up to 6,000 tons eastbound. Only one S-1 was fitted with a vestibule cab, No. 2552. Despite their overall success, they had a reputation for being hard on the rails. They were also fitted with roller bearings in the 1940s.

=== Revenue service ===
When delivered, they were assigned for passenger service over the Divide between Havre and Whitefish, Montana, then in 1931, they were tested to pull freight between Whitefish, Montana and Hillyard, Washington. The test was a success and the S-1s were reassigned to pull freight trains, leaving the passenger runs mainly to the later S-2 Class of 1930. The S-1 continued pulling freight until dieselization. Retirement started on April 19, 1956 and by April 1958, all of the S-1s have been retired.

== Disposition ==
No S-1 has survived into preservation today, the first S-1 was sold for scrap on April 19, 1956 and by 1963, all of the S-1s have been scrapped.

== Roster ==
Number	Baldwin serial number	Date built	Disposition	Notes
2550	60781	April 1929	Retired December 1957, scrapped 1963.	
2551	60782	April 1929	Retired December 1957, scrapped 1963.	
2552	60807	May 1929	Retired December 1957, scrapped 1963.	Received Vestibule cab.
2553	60808	May 1929	Sold for scrap, Paper Calmenson and Company (Note: See File:Paper Calmenson scrap metal collection truck and workers, St. Paul (4419504752).jpg and File:Norm Silberstein standing on the bed of a Paper-Calmenson scrap metal pick-up truck, St. Paul (4419484108).jpg), April 19, 1956.	
2554	60809	May 1929	Retired December 1957, scrapped 1963.	
2555	60810	May 1929	Retired April 1958, scrapped 1963.	

== See also ==
- Great Northern S-2
