= Michigan, North Dakota train wreck =

Rail disaster in North Dakota

Coordinates: 48°1′24″N 98°7′40″W

Michigan train wreck
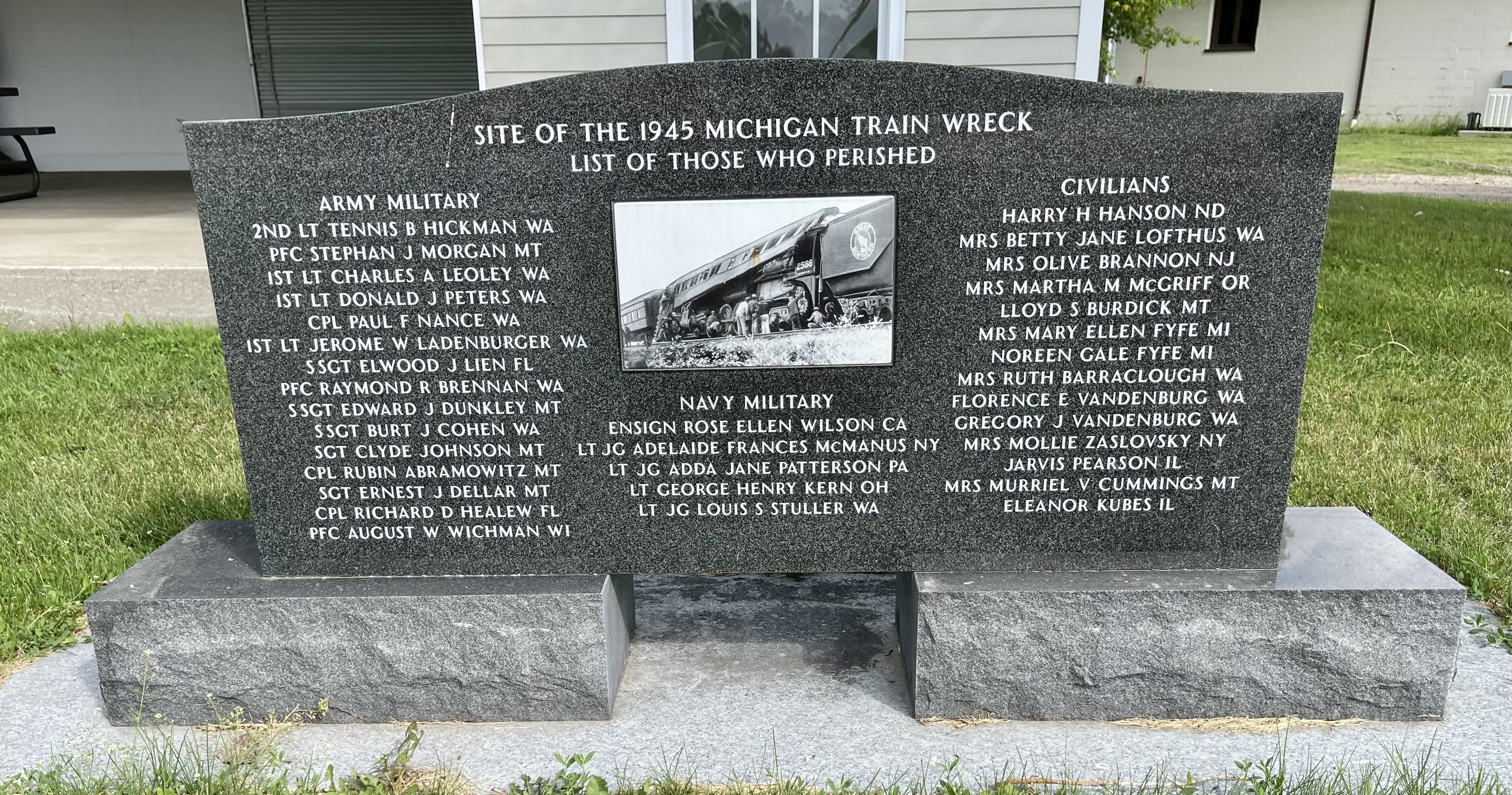

Details
- Date: August 9, 1945; 80 years ago 7.22 p.m.
- Location: Michigan City, North Dakota
- Country: United States
- Operator: Great Northern Railway
- Incident type: Rear collision
- Cause: Failure to protect lead train

Statistics
- Trains: 2
- Deaths: 34
- Injured: 303

The Michigan train wreck was the worst rail disaster in both North Dakota and Great Northern Railway history. It happened on August 9, 1945, at Michigan, North Dakota, and involved Great Northern's premier train, the Empire Builder.

== Trains ==
Train consists
August 9, 1945
- Train: First #1, Empire Builder
- GN 2584 (class S-2); GN 650 dormitory car; GN 1030 Oregon dining car; Pullman 4290 tourist sleeping car; Pullman 4065 tourist sleeping car; General W.C. Brown Pullman sleeping car; GN 1032 Minnesota dining car; General E.S. Godfrey Pullman sleeping car; General Gibbon Pullman sleeping car; General Benteen Pullman sleeping car; Crookston Pullman sleeping car; Peoria Pullman sleeper-lounge-observation car
- Train: Second #1, Empire Builder
- GN 2588 (class S-2); GN 65 baggage-mail car; CBQ 1476 baggage car; GN 667 coach; CBQ 4800 coach; GN 758 coach; GN 1043 Pennsylvania dining car; GN 944 coach; GN 939 coach; GN 995 coach; GN 967 coach; CBQ 4811 coach

Due to heavy patronage during World War II the Empire Builder ran in two sections, known as First 1 and Second 1. On the fateful day both sections were hauled by Baldwin built GN S-2 4-8-4 steam locomotives. When the trains departed St. Paul Union Depot they were twenty minutes apart. They travelled to Fargo via Willmar.

After a crew change, First 1 left Fargo at 3:25 that afternoon headed by locomotive No. 2584, carrying 237 passengers in eleven cars, mostly Pullman sleepers. Second 1 comprised eleven coaches hauled by locomotive No. 2588. It carried between 600 and 700 people. The trains were under the control of the Office of Defense Transportation (ODT) and most passengers were military personnel and their families. Automatic Block Signal (ABS) protection was in place up to Fargo but not on the section beyond, via Grand Forks and Surrey to Minot. On departing Grand Forks there was thirty minutes between the trains; but four miles west of Niagara the brakeman on First 1 reported smoke coming from the tender, a hot box (overheated journal bearing) was discovered and repacked, and a water line fixed to supply water to cool the journal. First 1 stopped again at Petersburg to check the journal and adjust the hose. All the time Second 1 was gaining on it.

== Collision ==
First 1's final stop was made at Michigan on a shallow curve as the journal was smoking again (the investigation later found the water-line was clogged). The engineer was inspecting the journal when the conductor heard Second 1 approaching – he ordered the fireman to get the train moving. The flagman lit a fusee and ran back down the track to warn the oncoming train, but it was too late; just as First 1 began to move off, and four minutes after it had stopped, it was struck from behind by Second 1. It had managed to slow but struck the rear car of section one at a speed of 45 mph. According to the ICC Report, the whole of the front train was "driven forward 165 feet by the impact. The rear car, a “bobtail” – part observation car and part sleeping berths, was telescoped practically its entire length by the engine of Second 1, and was demolished. The engine of Second 1 was derailed but remained upright and in line with the track, and was covered by the top and side sheets of the rear car of First 1". Only two of the 35 people in the rear car escaped alive; the rest were either killed in the initial impact or by the steam escaping from the engine below. A serviceman who saw the approaching train managed to jump out of a window; the only other survivor was a woman but she survived only 15 minutes after being freed after spending six hours trapped in the wreckage. The accident happened at 7.22 p.m. People from nearby Michigan were soon on the scene to help with ladders and welding equipment to cut through the steel. As dark came car headlights were used to light the gruesome scene.

== Investigation ==
In the absence of an automatic blocking system the 20 minute interval between passenger trains was enforced by operators at open stations. Unfortunately between Grand Forks and Surrey, a distance of 200 miles, only four stations were open when the Empire Builder passed. When the two sections left the last open station 31 minutes apart, the two previous stops had taken 25 minutes, nullifying the 20-minute spacing interval.

The investigation recommended that the Automatic Block Signal system be extended across the whole of the route. It found that "this accident was caused by failure to provide adequate protection for the preceding train". A coroner's jury found the flagman and conductor of the lead train to be responsible for the accident and they were dismissed from service.

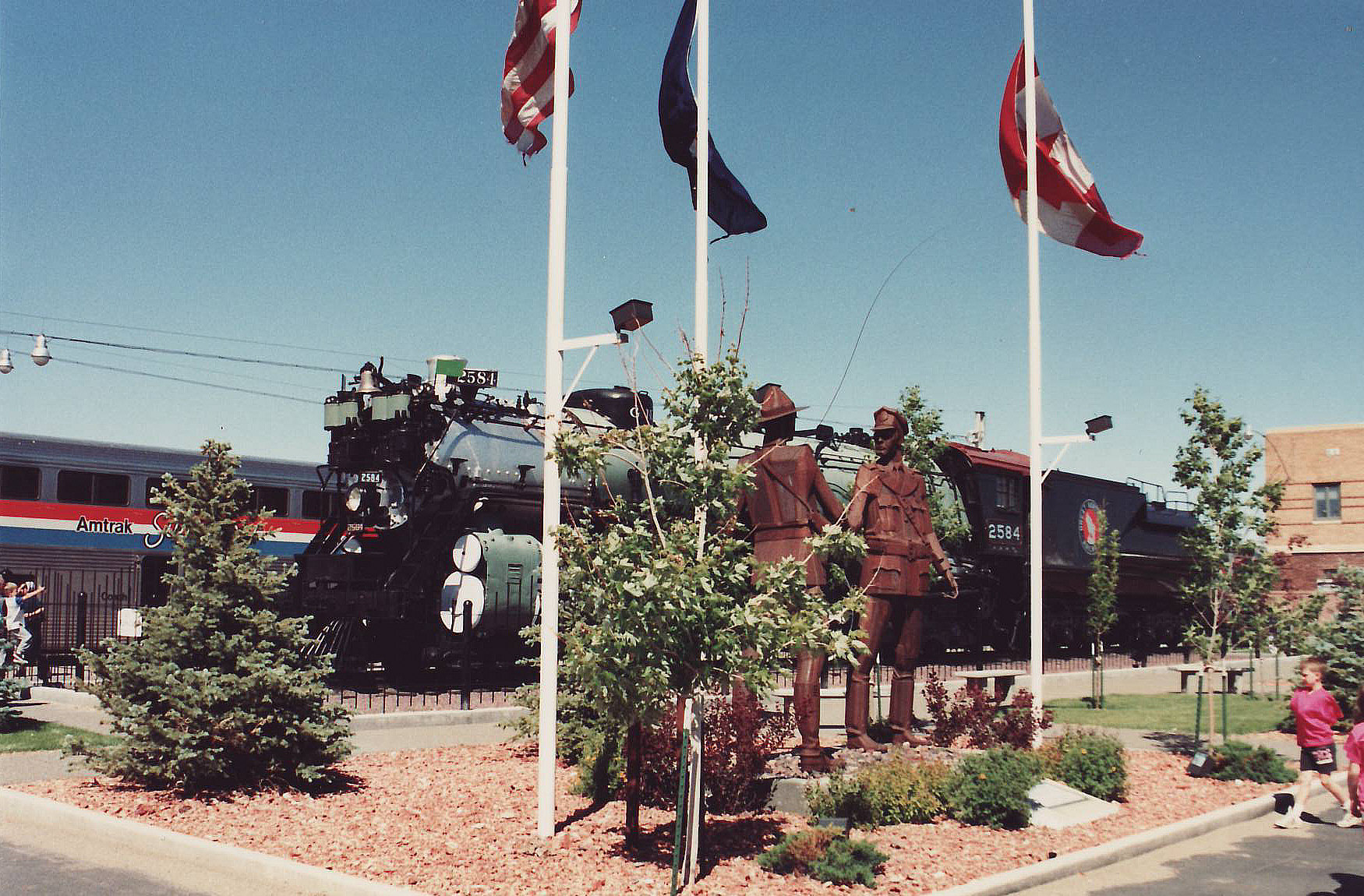
Locomotive 2584 at Havre, Montana

The locomotive of the first section, No. 2584, has been preserved and is on display at the Havre, Montana station.

Lloyd Burdick, a former National Football League player, was killed in the wreck.
