= Gildford, Montana =

- Census-designated place
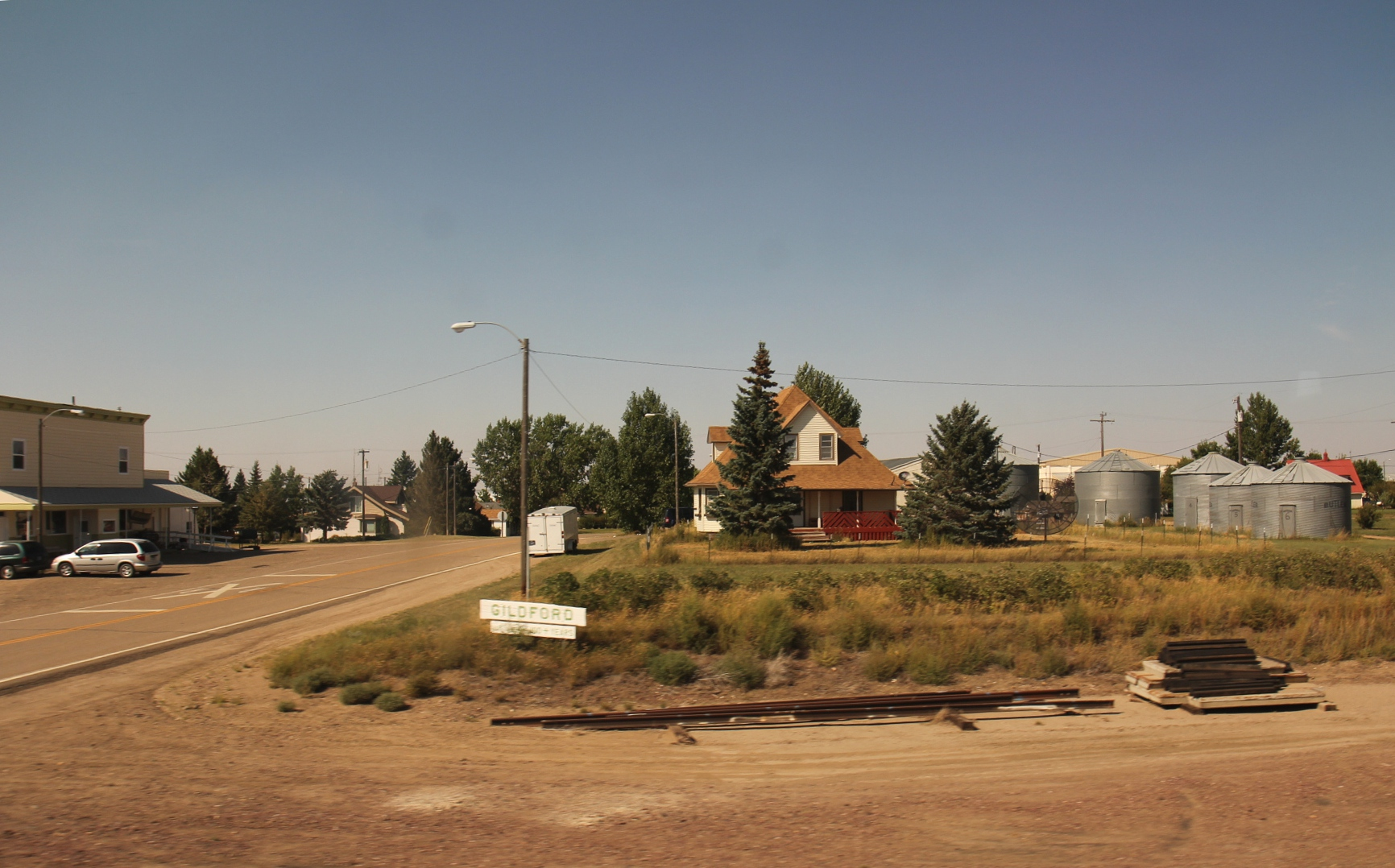
- Downtown Gildford

- Location of Gildford, Montana
- Coordinates: 48°34′25″N 110°18′26″W
- Country: United States
- State: Montana
- County: Hill

Area
  - Total: 1.14 sq mi (2.94 km^{2})
  - Land: 1.14 sq mi (2.94 km^{2})
  - Water: 0 sq mi (0.00 km^{2})
- Elevation: 2,825 ft (861 m)

Population (2020)
  - Total: 141
  - Density: 124.1/sq mi (47.93/km^{2})
- Time zone: UTC-7 (Mountain (MST))
  - Summer (DST): UTC-6 (MDT)
- ZIP code: 59525
- Area code: 406
- FIPS code: 30-30700
- GNIS feature ID: 2408293

Gildford is an unincorporated community and census-designated place (CDP) in Hill County, Montana, United States. As of the 2020 census, Gildford had a population of 141.

The town was named for Guildford, England. A flour mill, which milled Golden Grain Flour, operated from 1915 to 1951.

== Geography ==
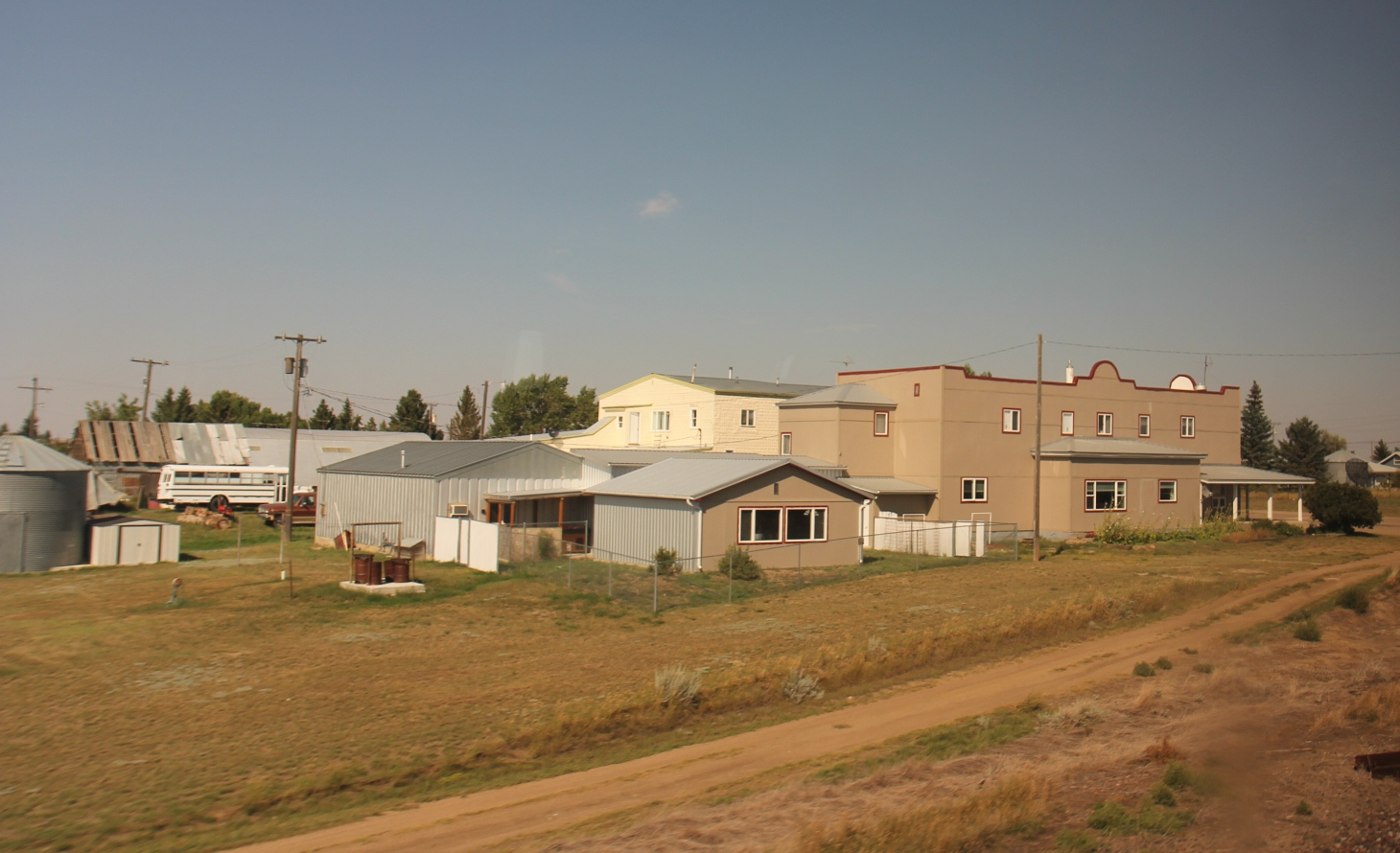
Buildings in Gildford

Gildford is located in west-central Hill County. U.S. Route 2 passes along the southern edge of the community, leading east 29 miles (47 km) to Havre, the county seat, and west 74 miles (119 km) to Shelby.

According to the United States Census Bureau, the CDP has a total area of 5.0 square miles (13 km^{2}), all land.

=== Climate ===
Climate data for Gildford, Montana (1991–2020 normals, extremes 1958–present)
Month	Jan	Feb	Mar	Apr	May	Jun	Jul	Aug	Sep	Oct	Nov	Dec	Year
Record high °F (°C)	65 (18)	75 (24)	79 (26)	89 (32)	97 (36)	103 (39)	111 (44)	110 (43)	110 (43)	89 (32)	77 (25)	66 (19)	111 (44)
Mean maximum °F (°C)	51.5 (10.8)	54.1 (12.3)	65.4 (18.6)	77.7 (25.4)	86.1 (30.1)	91.7 (33.2)	98.3 (36.8)	98.2 (36.8)	90.6 (32.6)	78.7 (25.9)	63.4 (17.4)	52.6 (11.4)	100.0 (37.8)
Mean daily maximum °F (°C)	28.7 (−1.8)	32.3 (0.2)	43.2 (6.2)	55.7 (13.2)	66.0 (18.9)	73.9 (23.3)	83.8 (28.8)	82.4 (28.0)	70.7 (21.5)	55.8 (13.2)	41.0 (5.0)	31.2 (−0.4)	55.4 (13.0)
Daily mean °F (°C)	17.1 (−8.3)	20.3 (−6.5)	30.4 (−0.9)	41.8 (5.4)	51.7 (10.9)	59.8 (15.4)	67.1 (19.5)	65.6 (18.7)	55.3 (12.9)	42.1 (5.6)	29.0 (−1.7)	19.6 (−6.9)	41.7 (5.4)
Mean daily minimum °F (°C)	5.6 (−14.7)	8.2 (−13.2)	17.6 (−8.0)	28.0 (−2.2)	37.5 (3.1)	45.8 (7.7)	50.3 (10.2)	48.8 (9.3)	39.9 (4.4)	28.4 (−2.0)	17.0 (−8.3)	8.1 (−13.3)	27.9 (−2.3)
Mean minimum °F (°C)	−22.7 (−30.4)	−18.9 (−28.3)	−7.0 (−21.7)	13.7 (−10.2)	24.9 (−3.9)	35.5 (1.9)	42.2 (5.7)	37.8 (3.2)	26.7 (−2.9)	10.1 (−12.2)	−7.6 (−22.0)	−17.1 (−27.3)	−32.0 (−35.6)
Record low °F (°C)	−45 (−43)	−44 (−42)	−37 (−38)	−16 (−27)	11 (−12)	29 (−2)	36 (2)	29 (−2)	13 (−11)	−20 (−29)	−30 (−34)	−44 (−42)	−45 (−43)
Average precipitation inches (mm)	0.34 (8.6)	0.27 (6.9)	0.29 (7.4)	0.99 (25)	1.77 (45)	2.60 (66)	1.09 (28)	1.05 (27)	1.08 (27)	0.82 (21)	0.47 (12)	0.34 (8.6)	11.11 (282)
Average precipitation days (≥ 0.01 in)	3.6	2.6	3.2	5.2	7.7	9.3	4.9	5.2	5.0	4.7	3.5	3.0	57.9
Source: NOAA

== School ==
Historically Gildford had an independent public school district, but consolidated with Kremlin to form the K-G School District in 1971. At that time the junior and senior high schools were located in Gildford. Further consolidation occurred in advance of the 2005-06 school year when the K-G School District consolidated with the neighboring Blue Sky School District, forming the North Star Public School District (Districts 99 and M). With this most recent merger, the elementary school is located in Gildford. The junior and senior high schools are now located in Rudyard, Montana. The current mascot for North Star Public Schools is the Knight, with the school colors being black, royal blue, and white.

== Demographics ==
Historical population
Census	Pop.	Note	%±
2020	141		—
U.S. Decennial Census

As of the census of 2000, there were 185 people, 76 households, and 54 families residing in the CDP. The population density was 36.9 inhabitants per square mile (14.2/km^{2}). There were 86 housing units at an average density of 17.2 per square mile (6.6/km^{2}). The racial makeup of the CDP was 97.84% White, 1.08% Native American, and 1.08% from two or more races.

There were 76 households, out of which 31.6% had children under the age of 18 living with them, 64.5% were married couples living together, 3.9% had a female householder with no husband present, and 28.9% were non-families. 27.6% of all households were made up of individuals, and 13.2% had someone living alone who was 65 years of age or older. The average household size was 2.43 and the average family size was 2.98.

In the CDP, the population was spread out, with 27.0% under the age of 18, 4.9% from 18 to 24, 25.9% from 25 to 44, 21.1% from 45 to 64, and 21.1% who were 65 years of age or older. The median age was 40 years. For every 100 females, there were 92.7 males. For every 100 females age 18 and over, there were 84.9 males.

The median income for a household in the CDP was $33,125, and the median income for a family was $43,750. Males had a median income of $23,125 versus $28,438 for females. The per capita income for the CDP was $17,648. About 4.4% of families and 4.9% of the population were below the poverty line, including none of those under the age of eighteen and 6.1% of those 65 or over.

== Transportation ==
Amtrak’s Empire Builder, which operates between Seattle/Portland and Chicago, passes through the town on BNSF tracks, but makes no stop. The nearest station is located in Havre, 29 miles (47 km) to the east.
