= Tres Cruces, Jujuy =

Coordinates: 22°55′00″S 65°34′50″W

Tres Cruces (Argentina)
- Municipality and town
- Interactive map of Tres Cruces (Argentina)
- Country: Argentina
- Province: Jujuy Province
- Time zone: UTC−3 (ART)

Tres Cruces (Argentina) is a town and municipality in Jujuy Province in Argentina, about 20 km from Iturbe.
