= Iturbe, Jujuy =

Coordinates: 22°58′44″S 65°21′13″W

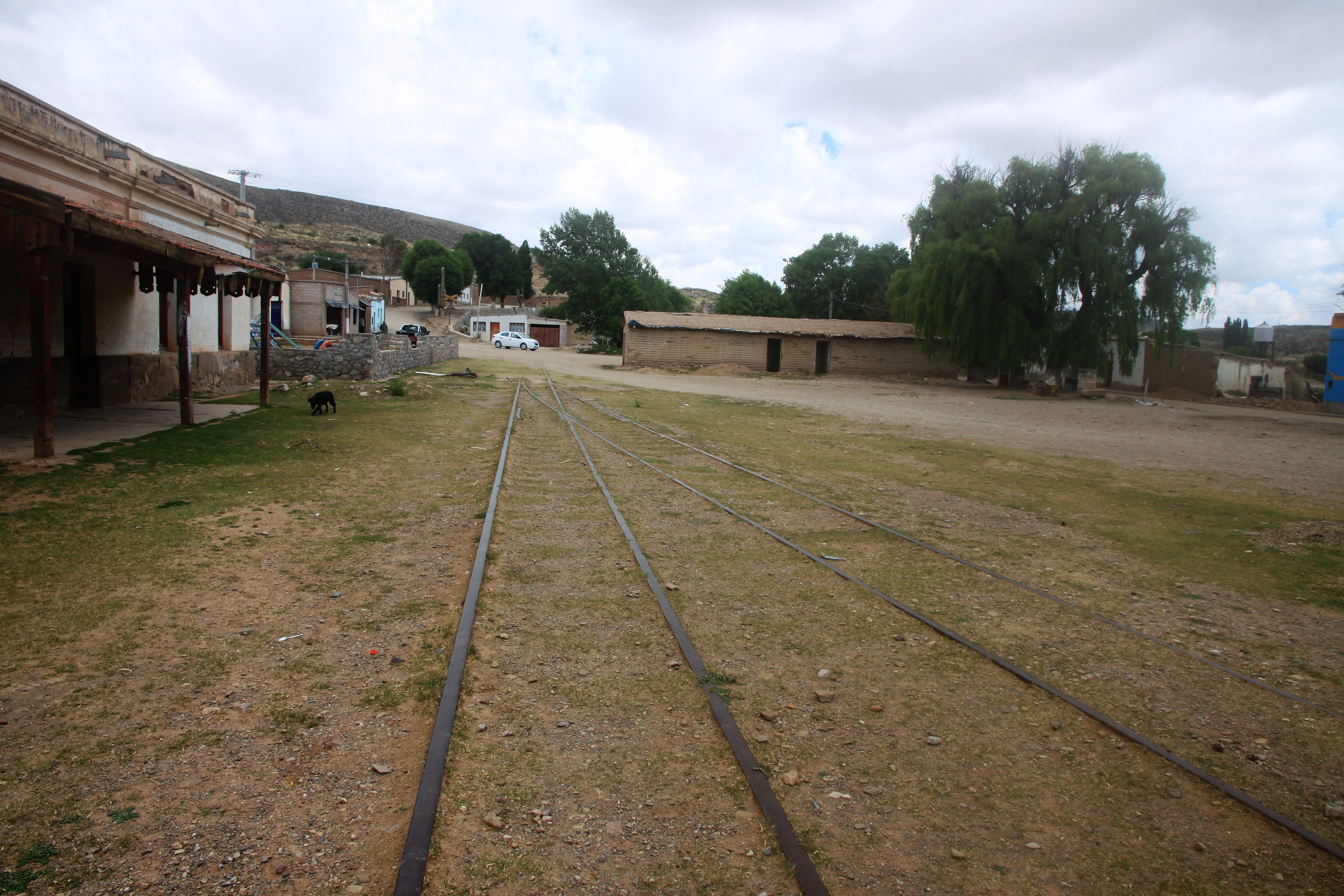

Iturbe is a town north of the Quebrada de Humahuaca in the Jujuy Province, Argentina. It is located in the Humahuaca Department, 161 km from the city of San Salvador de Jujuy at a height of 3,223 metres. It is also known under the names of Hipolito Yrigoyen and Negra Muerta.
