= Michigan City, North Dakota =

- City
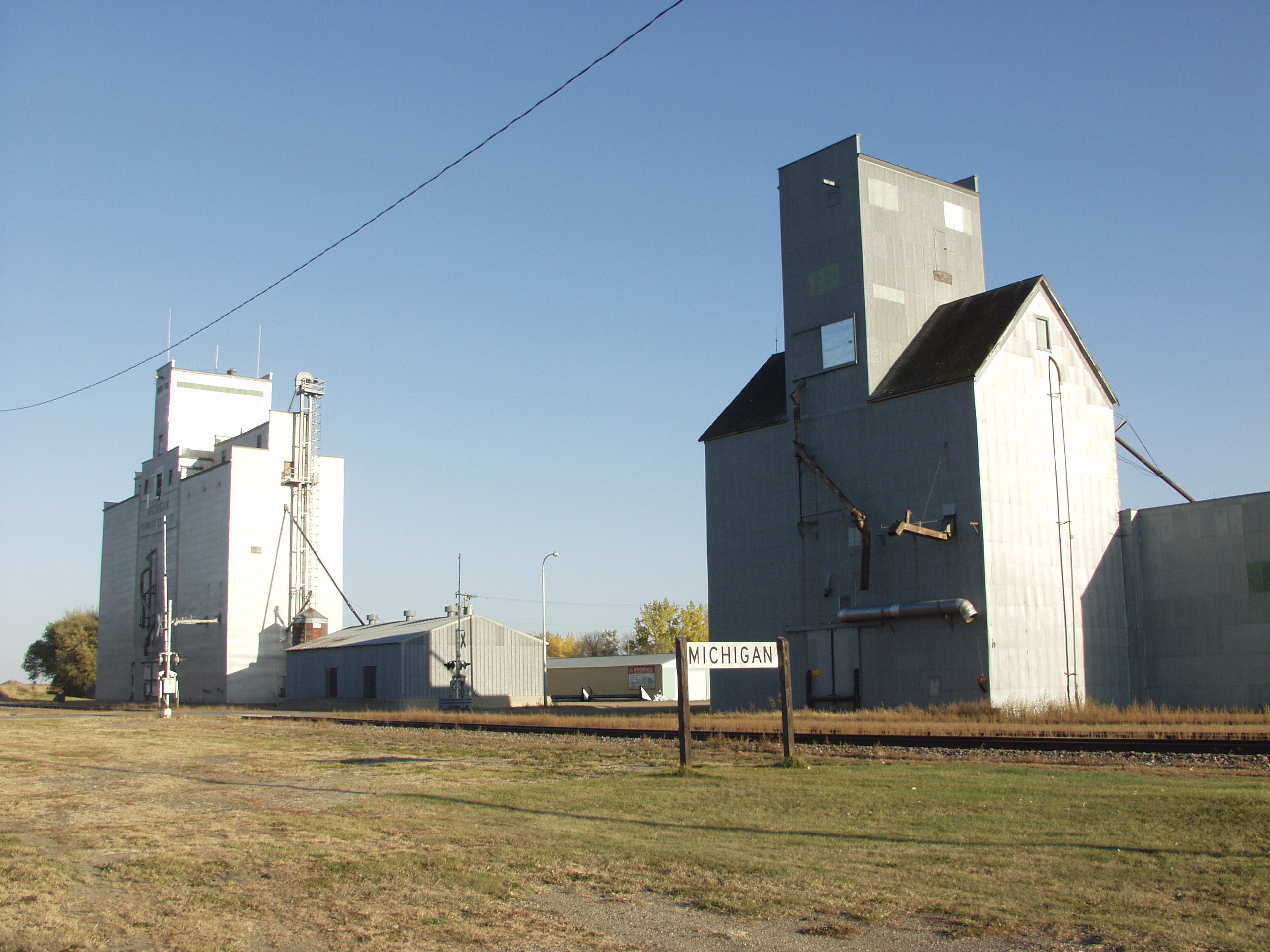
- The railroad and grain elevators in Michigan City

- Location of Michigan City, North Dakota
- Coordinates: 48°01′29″N 98°07′11″W
- Country: United States
- State: North Dakota
- County: Nelson
- Founded: 1882

Area
  - Total: 0.51 sq mi (1.33 km^{2})
  - Land: 0.50 sq mi (1.30 km^{2})
  - Water: 0.012 sq mi (0.03 km^{2})
- Elevation: 1,516 ft (462 m)

Population (2020)
  - Total: 263
  - Estimate (2024): 260
  - Density: 522.9/sq mi (201.89/km^{2})
- Time zone: UTC–6 (Central (CST))
  - Summer (DST): UTC–5 (CDT)
- ZIP Code: 58259
- Area code: 701
- FIPS code: 38-52740
- GNIS feature ID: 1036161
- Website: michigannd.com

Michigan City is a city in Nelson County, North Dakota, United States. The population was 263 at the 2020 census. Though the official name is Michigan City, local residents commonly refer to the city as Michigan. The town population has been declining since the 1980 census.

Michigan City was founded in 1882 by Edwin A. Lamb, who came to the area from Port Huron, Michigan.

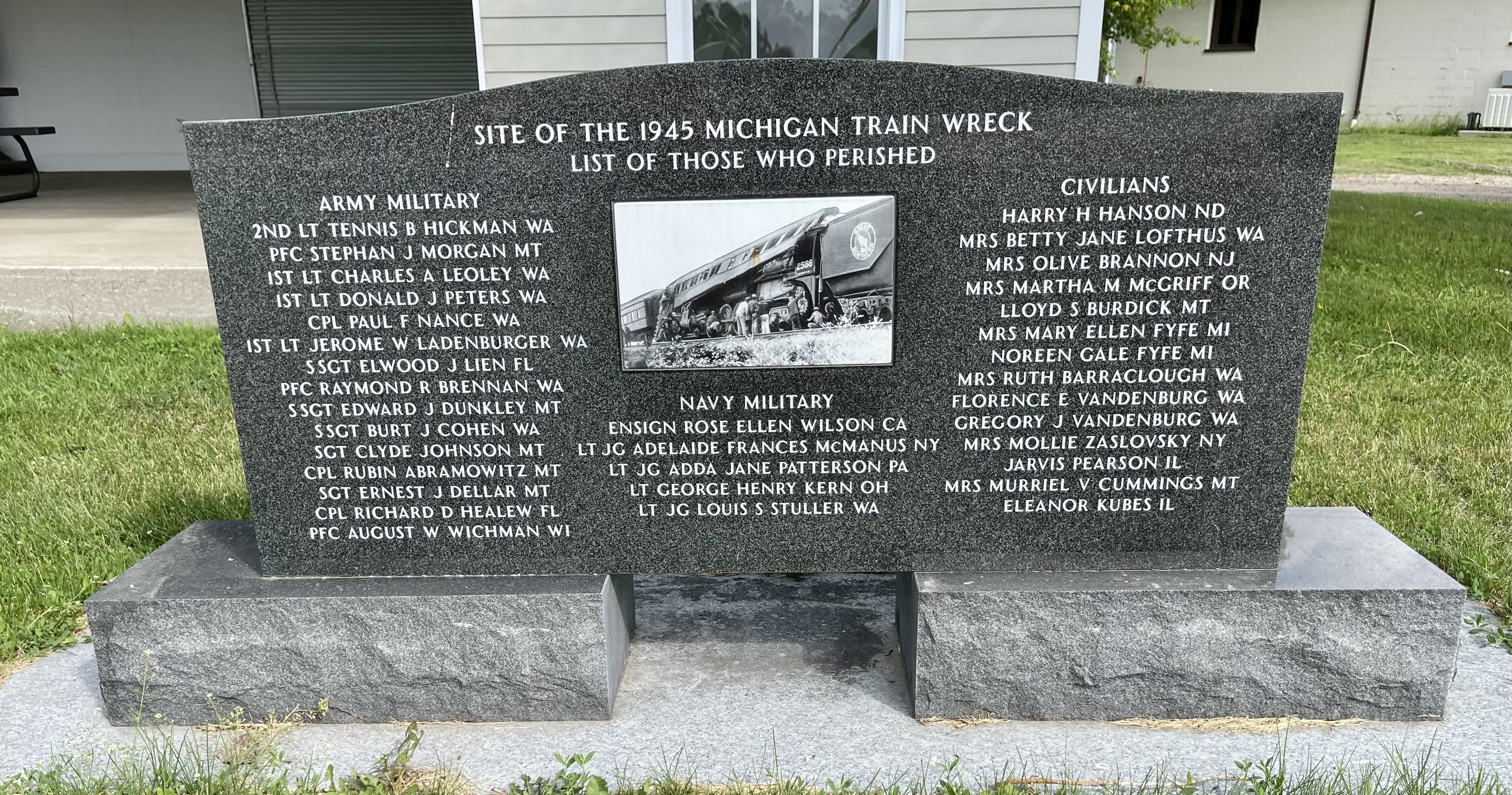
Site of the 1945 Michigan train wreck, Michigan, North Dakota

In 1945, a Great Northern passenger train collided into the rear of another near the city, causing 309 injuries and 34 deaths. Most of the passengers on the two trains were soldiers returning home from World War II.

The city hosts the annual Michigan Days festival each August.

== Geography ==
According to the United States Census Bureau, the city has a total area of 0.52 square miles (1.35 km^{2}), of which 0.51 square miles (1.32 km^{2}) is land and 0.01 square miles (0.03 km^{2}) is water.

Michigan is located between Grand Forks and Devils Lake, both in North Dakota.

== Demographics ==
Historical population
Census	Pop.	Note	%±
1900	309		—
1910	449		45.3%
1920	491		9.4%
1930	433		−11.8%
1940	491		13.4%
1950	486		−1.0%
1960	451		−7.2%
1970	478		6.0%
1980	502		5.0%
1990	413		−17.7%
2000	345		−16.5%
2010	294		−14.8%
2020	263		−10.5%
2024 (est.)	260		−1.1%
U.S. Decennial Census; 2020 Census

=== 2010 census ===
As of the census of 2010, there were 294 people, 149 households, and 82 families residing in the city. The population density was 576.5 inhabitants per square mile (222.6/km^{2}). There were 173 housing units at an average density of 339.2 per square mile (131.0/km^{2}). The racial makeup of the city was 96.9% White, 1.7% Native American, and 1.4% from two or more races. Hispanic or Latino of any race were 1.0% of the population.

There were 149 households, of which 18.8% had children under the age of 18 living with them, 45.0% were married couples living together, 7.4% had a female householder with no husband present, 2.7% had a male householder with no wife present, and 45.0% were non-families. 38.3% of all households were made up of individuals, and 12.8% had someone living alone who was 65 years of age or older. The average household size was 1.97 and the average family size was 2.62.

The median age in the city was 49.8 years. 18% of residents were under the age of 18; 9.3% were between the ages of 18 and 24; 15.7% were from 25 to 44; 35% were from 45 to 64; and 22.1% were 65 years of age or older. The gender makeup of the city was 50.7% male and 49.3% female.

=== 2000 census ===
As of the census of 2000, there were 345 people, 159 households, and 94 families residing in the city. The population density was 645.7 inhabitants per square mile (249.3/km^{2}). There were 176 housing units at an average density of 329.4 per square mile (127.2/km^{2}). The racial makeup of the city was 99.13% White, 0.29% African American, 0.29% Asian, and 0.29% from two or more races.

There were 159 households, out of which 27.0% had children under the age of 18 living with them, 50.3% were married couples living together, 7.5% had a female householder with no husband present, and 40.3% were non-families. 38.4% of all households were made up of individuals, and 18.2% had someone living alone who was 65 years of age or older. The average household size was 2.17 and the average family size was 2.89.

In the city, the population was spread out, with 23.5% under the age of 18, 6.1% from 18 to 24, 24.9% from 25 to 44, 23.8% from 45 to 64, and 21.7% who were 65 years of age or older. The median age was 42 years. For every 100 females, there were 100.6 males. For every 100 females age 18 and over, there were 92.7 males.

The median income for a household in the city was $32,054, and the median income for a family was $40,833. Males had a median income of $27,250 versus $16,875 for females. The per capita income for the city was $16,034. About 4.5% of families and 8.5% of the population were below the poverty line, including 5.2% of those under age 18 and 11.0% of those age 65 or over.

== Transportation ==
Amtrak’s Empire Builder, which operates between Seattle/Portland and Chicago, passes through the town on BNSF tracks, but makes no stop. The nearest station is located in Devils Lake, 37 miles (60 km) to the northwest.
