= Havre station =

Railway station in Montana, United States

Havre, MT
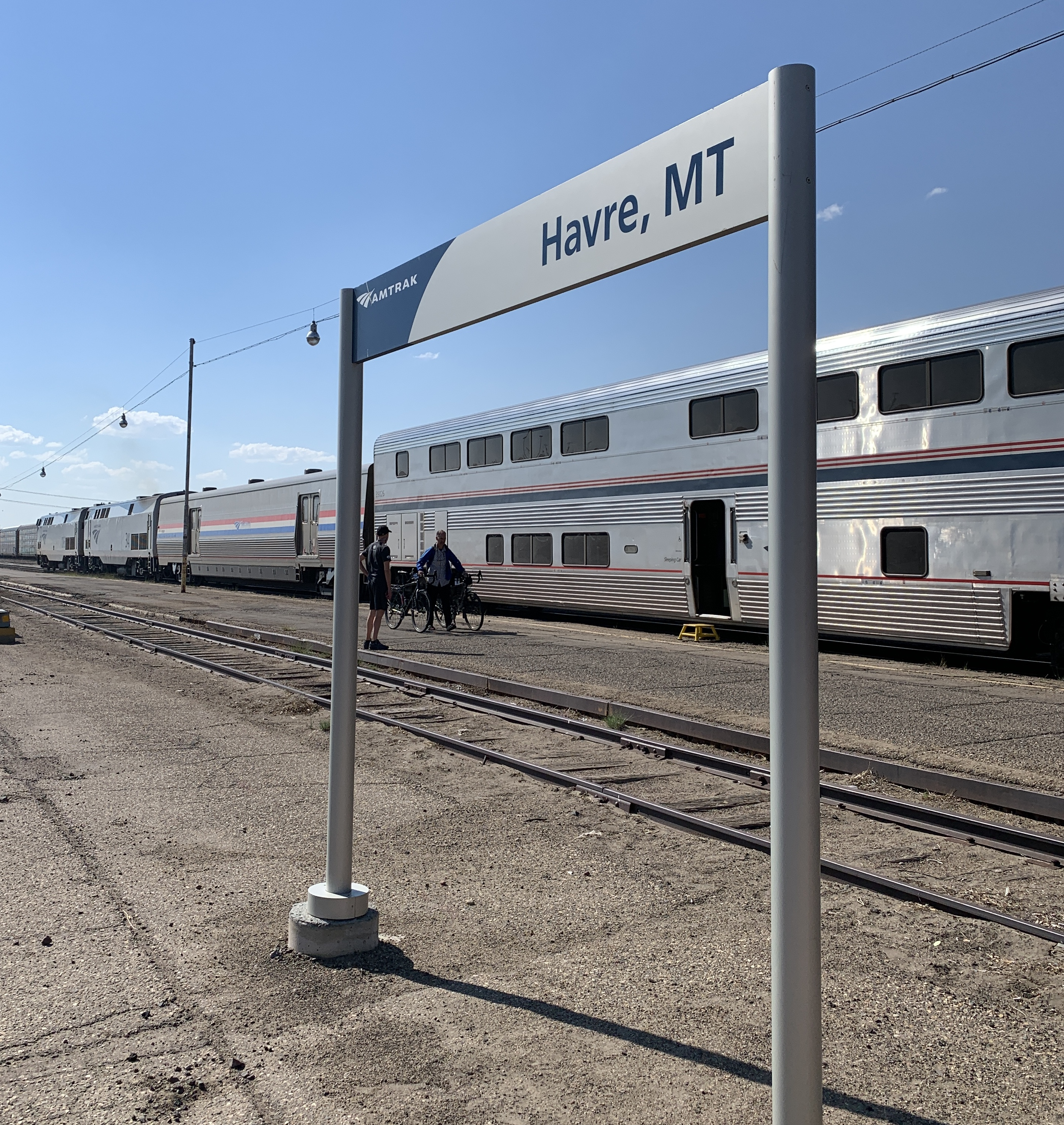
- Empire Builder at Havre station, July 2021

General information
- Location: 235 Main Street; Havre, Montana; United States
- Coordinates: 48.55457°N 109.67836°W
- Owner: BNSF Railway
- Line: BNSF Milk River / Hi Line subdivisions
- Platforms: 1 side platform, 1 island platform
- Tracks: 14

Construction
- Parking: Yes
- Accessible: Yes

Other information
- Station code: Amtrak: HAV

History
- Opened: June 18, 1893
- Rebuilt: 1907, 1953

Passengers
- FY 2025: 7,591 (Amtrak)

Services
Preceding station	Amtrak	Following station
Shelby toward Seattle or Portland	Empire Builder	Malta toward Chicago
Former services
Preceding station	Great Northern Railway	Following station
Burnham toward Seattle	Main Line	Lohman toward St. Paul
Assinniboine toward Butte	Butte – Havre	Terminus
Location

Havre station is a train station, re-fueling, and service stop for the Amtrak Empire Builder in Havre, Montana. The station, platform, and parking are owned by BNSF Railway, and the station was previously owned and operated by the Great Northern Railway.

On static display, next to the station, is Great Northern Railway steam locomotive #2584, a 4-8-4 "Northern" type S-2 Class, which served the station while it was in passenger service. It has been on display there since May 15, 1964. Nearby is a sculpture representing "U.S. – Canada Friendship" and a statue of James J. Hill, the man for whom the Empire Builder is named and the developer of the Great Northern Railway.
