= First Peoples Buffalo Jump State Park =

State park in Montana, USA

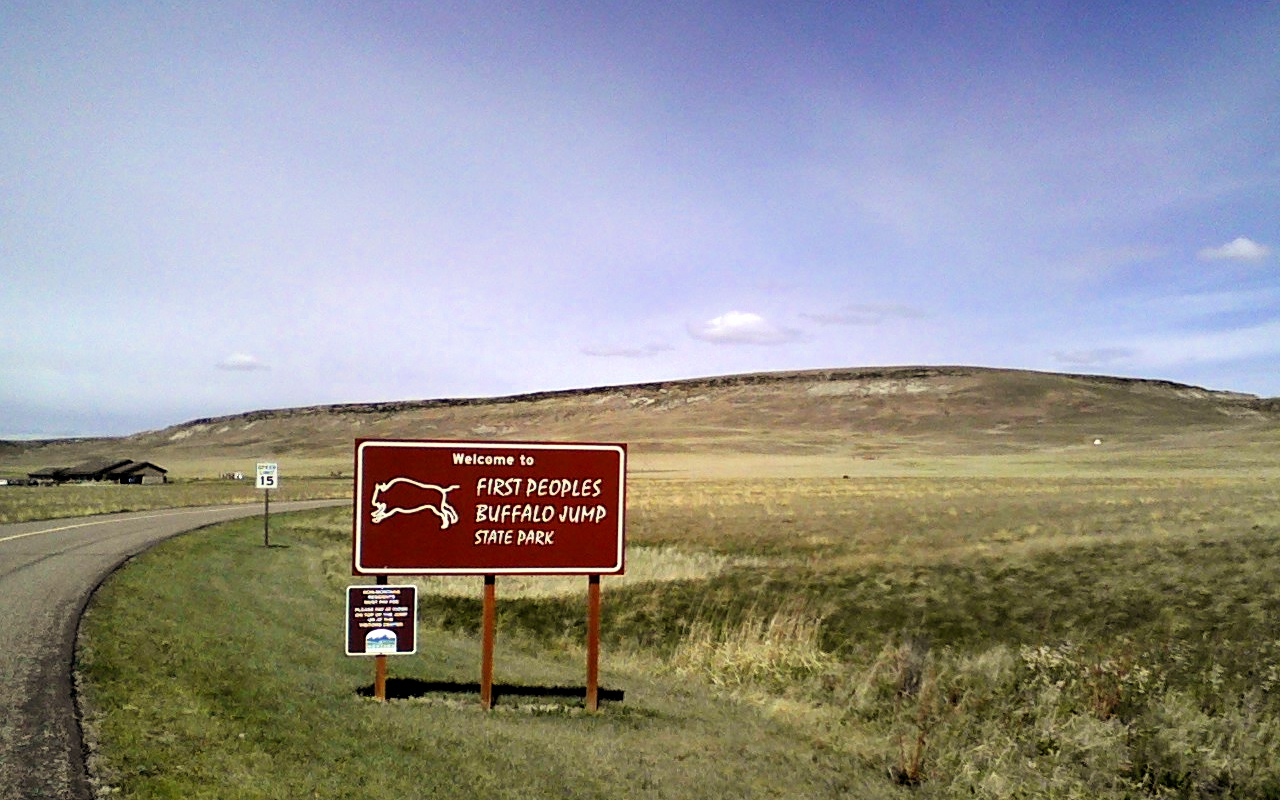

- Location within Montana
- Location: Cascade County, Montana, United States
- Nearest city: Great Falls, Montana
- Coordinates: 47°29′23″N 111°31′45″W
- Area: 1,481 acres (5.99 km^{2})
- Elevation: 3,773 ft (1,150 m)
- Designation: Montana state park
- Established: 1972
- Named for: A buffalo jump and the First Peoples of Montana
- Visitors: 34,195 (in 2023)
- Administrator: Montana Fish, Wildlife & Parks
- Website: First Peoples Buffalo Jump State Park

First Peoples Buffalo Jump State Park is a Montana state park and National Historic Landmark in Cascade County, Montana in the United States. The park is 1,481 acres (599 ha) and sits at an elevation of 3,773 feet (1,150 m). It is located about 3.5 miles (5.6 km) northwest of the small town of Ulm, which is near the city of Great Falls. First Peoples Buffalo Jump State Park contains the Ulm Pishkun (also known as the Ulm Buffalo Jump), a historic buffalo jump utilized by the Native American tribes of North America. It has been described as, geographically speaking, either North America's largest buffalo jump or the world's largest. There is some evidence that it was the most utilized buffalo jump in the world. The site was added to the National Register of Historic Places on December 17, 1974, and designated a National Historic Landmark in August 2015. The former name of the park was derived from the Blackfeet word "Pis'kun," meaning "deep kettle of blood," and the nearby town of Ulm.

Although there are more than 300 buffalo kill sites in Montana, First People's Buffalo Jump is one of only three protected buffalo jumps in the state. The other two are Madison Buffalo Jump near Three Forks, and Wahkpa Chu'gn near Havre, both of which are also on the National Register of Historic Places.

== History ==
=== Native American use ===
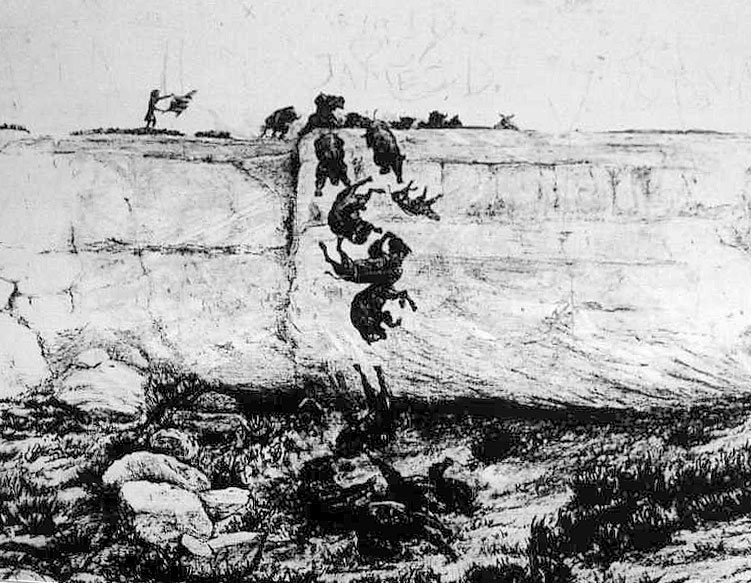
Artist's depiction of a buffalo jump in use.

The site's cliff face is approximately 1 mile (1.6 km) long, and has been variously measured at between 30 and 50 feet (9.1 and 15.2 m) in height. The east–west-trending cliff is composed of sandstone that is part of the bentonitic Taft Hill Member of the Blackleaf Formation.

Archeological research and carbon dating of evidence at the site indicates that Native Americans used the site as early as 500 CE. However, in 2011, park archeologists found a point (either a large arrowhead or a spearhead) that initial estimates indicated might be as much as 5,000 years old, which would force a radical revision in the date of earliest use. This appears to be infrequent. Most evidence indicates that the pishkun began to be heavily frequented for hunting purposes around 900 CE.

The site was used as a "buffalo jump," a place where American bison could be driven up a hill and over a cliff. Prior to 1700 CE, Native Americans lacked horses. Because they utilized dogs as hunting companions and for transportation, this time period is known as the "Dog Days" by many tribes. Bison served as a significant food source for many Native American tribes. Killing the animals, however, was difficult, as bison are notoriously difficult to herd or capture, and can be highly aggressive. Buffalo jumps were one way to kill large numbers of the animals at once without many of the risks associated with close-proximity ambush. Once the animals were driven over the cliff and incapacitated, they would be slaughtered and their meat, hides, and bones used by the hunters to feed and clothe their families and to make various tools and weapons. Jumps were rare, as ambush was a far more common killing method. There is conflicting evidence about what time of year the jumps were used most heavily. There is some evidence that bison kills usually occurred between early fall and early spring, but evidence of unborn and young calf skeletons at the site indicate that slaughter may have occurred year-round.

Under the most widely accepted scenario, hunters would slowly encircle a bison herd several miles from the jump and subtly drive them toward the base of the hill leading up to the cliff. It's not known how many hunters this required. Archeologists theorize that anywhere from 12 to 100 people may have participated. Low fences (or "drive lines") of rock and braided vines were built to help funnel the bison toward the summit. These fences extended back at least half a mile from the summit(about 260 stone piles, remnants of these drive lines, still exist near the hilltop and, in 2011, remains of the braided vines were also found at the site). As the bison began moving toward the summit, hunters (perhaps wearing wolf hides) would leap up from their hiding places behind the rock fences and begin making loud noises. This would begin to stampede the herd, so that they could not stop at the cliff face and would plummet over it to their deaths. There are oral history traditions among some tribes about "buffalo runners" – swift, brave young men who would drape themselves in a buffalo robe and race ahead of the herd to help lead them toward the cliff summit. The young man would leap over the cliff and land on a ledge just out of sight below, while the herd would plummet over and past him. Others (primarily women and children) would kill any animals who did not die from the fall, and butcher all the carcasses.

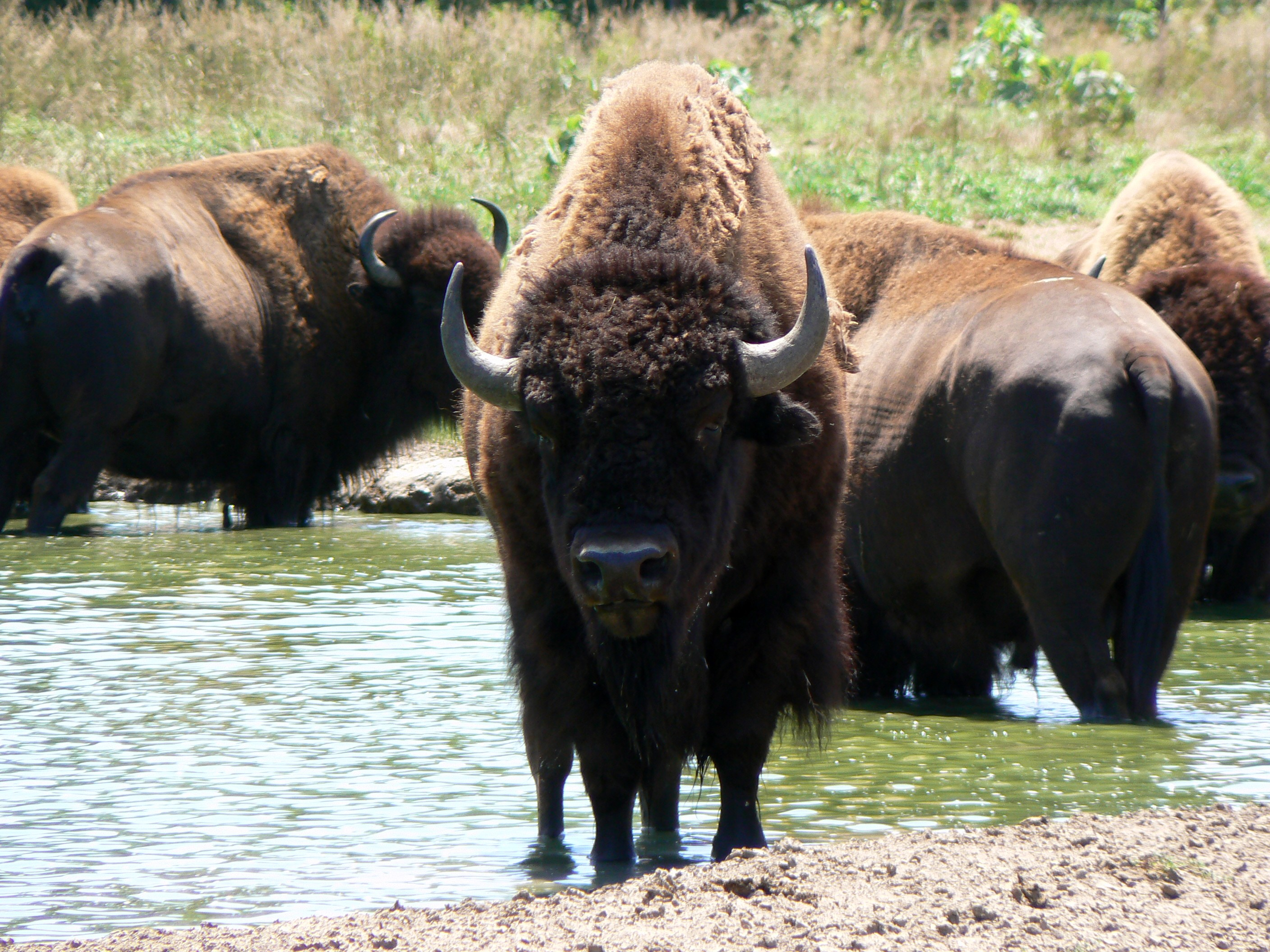
American bison

The slaughtering process changed over time. An analysis of the deep piles of bone at the site revealed that the earliest hunters probably just stripped the hides and meat off the dead animals. But, around 500 CE, Native Americans began using fire pits to cook or dry the meat, then pulverize it and mix it with dried berries and fat to create pemmican. Tribespeople also built shallow bowls in the earth and lined them with rock to create primitive cooking pots. These cooking devices (known as "blood kettles") were used to boil bison blood so that it would coagulate and to lessen its susceptibility to spoilage. Other foods would be mixed with the coagulated blood to form a sort of gelatinous food source high in protein and nutrients, or the cooked blood could be used with ground grain to make biscuits.

People came together under temporary leadership to plan and carry out bison drives and in the huge butchering task that followed. Willingness to obey leaders lasted only so long as it was made necessary by the demands of the communal work. Communal hunts required leadership and organization, but neither was carried over as a permanent feature of the sociopolitical system. When the drive and the distribution of dried meat was over, the need for leadership was gone, and they returned to informal band organizations.

Several Native American tribes have an oral history which includes the First Peoples Buffalo Jump. These include the A'aninin, Assiniboine, Cree, Kalispel, Piegan Blackfeet, Salish, and Shoshoni. Each of these tribes has its own name for this pishkun. There is evidence that other tribes may also have used the pishkun, but this is not conclusive. The site was certainly used heavily throughout this period, and there is archeological evidence that members of these tribes camped on and near the pishkun. One indication of how frequented the site was is the bone bed, which extends along the entire length of the cliff and is 13 feet (4.0 m) deep. An archeological estimate based on the number of bones at the site indicates that at least 6,000 bison died there.

With the arrival of the horse, Native American tribes began hunting buffalo from horseback, and the pishkun fell into disuse around 1700 CE.

=== Post-Native American use ===
The area that is today known as the state of Montana was made an organized incorporated territory of the United States in 1864 after a series of gold rushes. Settlement of the territory was sparse, especially the area around the pishkun. In 1878, the area containing the First Peoples Buffalo Jump fell under the control of William H. Ulm, a white settler from Indiana who homesteaded a 1,000-acre (400 ha) cattle ranch in the area. The pishkun itself was named Taft Hill. The nearby city of Great Falls was founded in 1883, and the Montana Central Railway arrived from the booming mining town of Butte (passing through Ulm on its way to Great Falls) in October 1887.

The pishkun site became a popular location for members of the public to look for arrowheads and other Native American artifacts. From 1889 to 1905, the pishkun was used as a sandstone quarry. Several buildings in Great Falls and Helena were built with sandstone quarried from the site.

The state of Montana obtained the site sometime prior to 1945. From 1945 to 1947, the need for phosphorus (a mineral used in fertilizer and explosives) was high. The state of Montana leased the site for $7,600 to the Frost Fertilizer Company, which began "mining" it for bone. More than 150 short tons (140 t) of bones were removed from the site, pulverized, and shipped to the West Coast for use as fertilizer and in explosives manufacturing. The site was one of the two largest pishkuns in the United States mined for bison bone. A second attempt to mine the site for bone was made in the 1950s, but local rancher, Earl Monroe, who wished to protect the site from further depredation, leased the land and kept it off-limits to the public.

=== As a state park ===
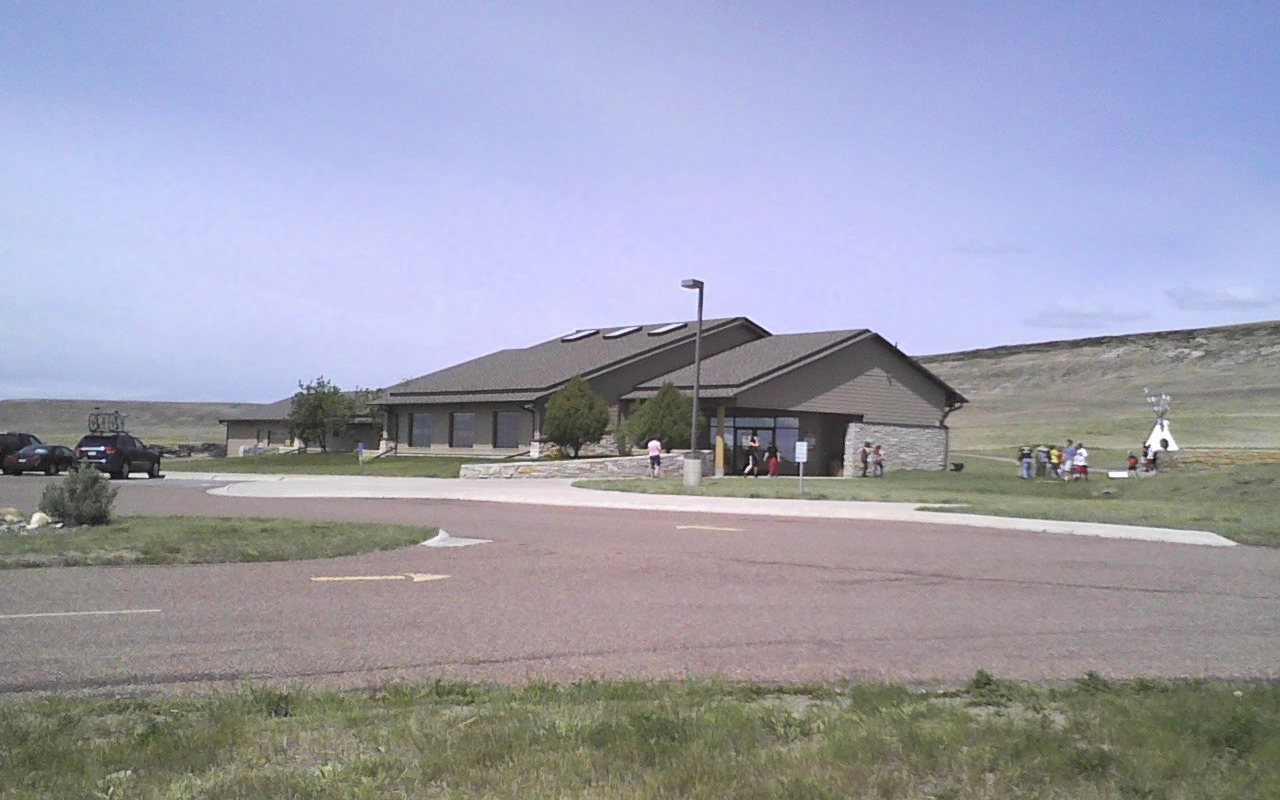
Visitor Center

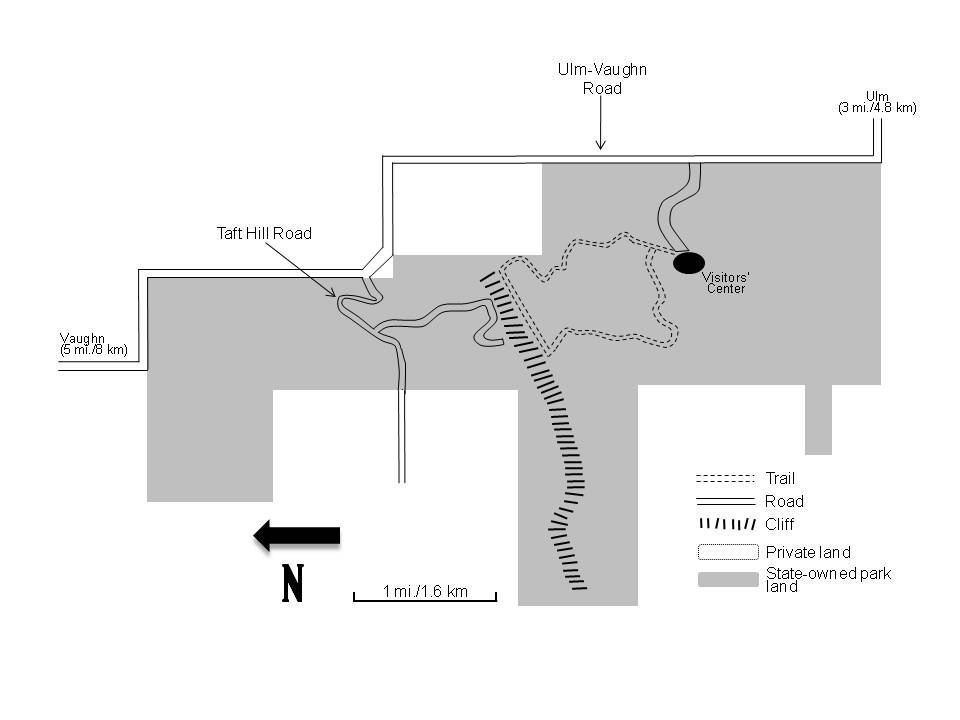
A map of First Peoples Buffalo Jump State Park as of 2011

The Montana Department of State Lands (now known as the Department of Natural Resources and Conservation) purchased a portion of the site in the 1930s. The lands were made part of the school trust lands – land held in trust for the benefit of the Montana public school system. Under a mandate from the Montana Constitution, these lands must be managed to obtain the maximum benefit possible. Amateur archeological activities began at the site in the 1950s and 1960s, which developed archeological evidence about the importance of the site. The first efforts to establish a state park occurred shortly thereafter but were unsuccessful.

In the early 1970s, the Montana Historical Society leased the portion of the site owned by the state. The historical society turned its lease over to the Montana Fish and Game Commission (now the Montana Department of Fish, Wildlife and Parks), which, in 1972, turned the 160-acre (65 ha) site into a Montana State Historical Monument. The Fish and Game Commission eventually leased the site directly and managed it on behalf of the Department of State Lands. From 1972 until 1998, the only amenities at the site were picnic tables and limited signage below the cliffs. Local private organizations assisted the Fish and Game Commission in maintaining the site. Scientific research, funded almost exclusively by private organizations, was conducted at the site in the 1990s.

The park underwent major expansion in the late 1990s. In 1993, media mogul Ted Turner – who owned large tracts of land in Montana – proposed giving the state of Montana 11,630 acres (4,710 ha) of land near Alder, Montana, and 1,059 acres (429 ha) at the Ulm pishkun in exchange for the state's releasing 7,486 acres (3,029 ha) of land located within Turner's Flying D Ranch (located just north of Yellowstone National Park). The Ulm land ran directly along the cliff face and near the base of the hill leading up to the jump. This proposal was rejected, but Turner modified the proposal and asked for just 6,167 acres (2,496 ha) of state-owned land within the Flying D. The state accepted the deal in 1996, but was sued by four sportsmen's groups who argued that the state was gaining access to low-quality fisheries near Alder and losing access to high-quality ones on the Flying D. The district court issued a summary judgment in favor of the state, but the Montana Supreme Court overturned this ruling in Skyline Sportsmen's Association v. Board of Land Commissioners, 286 Mont. 108, 951 P2d 29 (1997), and remanded the case back to the district court for further proceedings. In August 1998, Turner agreed to provide a 20-year conservation easement to give the public access to the fisheries on his land. Four months later, the state Department of Natural Resources and Conservation (DNRC) gave 1,070 acres (430 ha) of land next to the pishkun to the state Fish and Wildlife Commission in exchange for 1,067 acres (432 ha) nearby. The DNRC had gotten the land from Turner, and the swap occurred to help expand the southern portion of the pishkun by more than a mile.

The land swap meant that a number of improvements to the park could now go forward. The Montana FWP had long sought to build an interpretive center at the site but, due to the small amount of land the state owned, the project had never received permission. Although the land swap was not yet a done deal, in 1997, the Montana state legislature approved $950,000 for a new visitor center. The center was originally proposed for the top of the cliffs, but Native American tribes opposed that site. Instead, a 6,000-square-foot (560 m^{2}) center was sited at the base of the hill leading up to the cliffs.

A series of major improvements occurred at the site in 1999. Cascade County and the city of Great Falls each contributed $100,000 to widen the 3.5 miles (5.6 km) road leading to the pishkun, and the state spent $300,000 to pave it. When the $2.2 million visitor center opened in May 1999, it was the first pishkun visitor center in the state of Montana and the nation. The DFWP also engaged in a land swap with the DNRC in December 1999, giving away 630 acres (250 ha) of flat land in exchange of 700 acres (280 ha) of DNRC land near the base of the hill leading to the jump. FWP announced that the land swap would allow it to construct hiking trails from the visitor center to the cliff summit.

In February 2000, the site was changed from a state monument to a state park, and named Ulm Pishkun Buffalo Jump State Park. The same year, the All Nations Pishkun Association (ANPA), a group of all Native American tribes in the state, was formed to support the park, provide educational activities there, spread awareness of the park's existence, and encourage visitation to the site.

The park underwent expansion again the following year. In 2001, the state traded some excess land at the southern end of the jump for a private landowner's property near the top of the jump, a transaction which not only connected all parts of the jump for the first time but which also acquired the cliff for almost its entire length. In October, a winter wheat field between the cliff and the visitor center was removed and reseeded with native grass. Trails about 2 miles (3.2 km) long were also constructed in 2001 between the visitor center and the jump cliff.

The park began to reach its present size in 2002. In August, the DFWP leased more than 1,200 acres (490 ha) of DNRC land to the west of the park, doubling the size of the buffalo jump. Additionally, two privately leased portions of land next to the park were turned over to the DFWP as well. The ANPA leased a 360-acre (150 ha) site against the park's border for $2,500 a year, while ANPA secretary Brad Hamlett leased a 900-acre (360 ha) site to the park's south for $1,600 a year. The 900-acre section contained the last unprotected segment of the hill as it rose to the cliff face. Both leases were assigned to the DFWP for the term of the lease, which was 10 years (with an option to renew at the end).

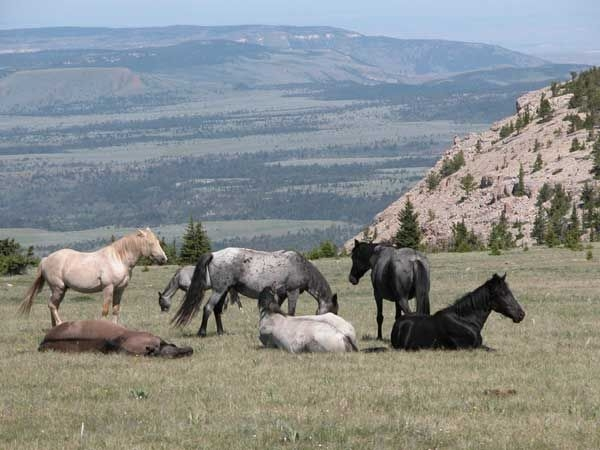
Wild horses from the Pryor Mountain Wild Horse Range, like these, are stabled at First Peoples Buffalo Jump State Park.

Development of educational activities at the pishkun occurred in other ways, too. In June 2004, the ANPA, in cooperation with DFWP and DNRC, began housing four Spanish Barb horses at the park. The Barbs were obtained from the Bureau of Land Management's Pryor Mountains Wild Horse Range, and are direct linear descendants of horses brought by the Spanish to North America in the 16th century.

Efforts to expand the park even further occurred in 2005. State officials began working on yet another land purchase that would permanently double the size of the park. In March 2005, the DFWP spent $96,500 to eliminate a hairpin turn on Taft Hill Road, reduce the road's grade, and lay new gravel on the road (which enters the park on its west side and provides vehicular access to the cliff face). Park officials also began to worry in 2005 about an infestation of black-tailed prairie dogs. The prairie dogs, which were not native to the area, took over an area about 200 acres (81 ha) in size, denuding it of vegetation and altering the historic appearance of the summit of the buffalo jump. Park officials worried that arrowheads and other artifacts were being exposed by the activity of the prairie dogs, and that tourists were taking these artifacts from the park. The prairie dogs were also destroying the tipi rings and sweat lodges placed at the top of the pishkun. The existence of the prairie dogs was also worrisome because the site was so poorly explored. In the summer of 2005, as park officials relocated a portion of the hiking trail leading to the top of the cliffs, they discovered three "blood kettles" mere feet from the old trail.

The 2005 effort to expand the park culminated in 2006. In July, the Montana Land Board, the state agency which supervises management of the state's school trust lands, agreed to buy the 898 acres (363 ha) of private land adjacent to the park's northern border for $763,000 and turn over a third of the acreage to the Ulm Buffalo Jump State Park. Marilyn and Ron Eustace, whose family had owned the property since the 1940s, had originally proposed a 250-acre (100 ha) land swap so that the state park could own more land on top of the cliff. But the state offered to buy the cliff-top land instead, along with the rest of the Eustace family ranch. The property had been the top item on the DFWP acquisition list. The purchase included the portion of the cliff not already owned by DFWP, and a large portion of the cliff and bone bed which had never been mined, quarried, or disturbed. Stone and braided vine "drive lines" and some tipi rings also existed on the Eustace land. The purchase was made using funds from the Montana Land Banking program, a program established in 2003 that seeks to manage state lands more effectively, improve the value of state land, increase the earning potential for this land, and/or reduce the risk to school trust land. The Land Board funded the transaction by using a portion of $6.4 million earned from selling an isolated industrial parcel near Kalispell. The Ulm pishkun sale was the first purchase the Land Board had ever made. The 300 acres (120 ha) of land transferred to DFWP was non-productive; DNRC retained the remaining land, and said it intended to lease it for farming or grazing. The addition expanded the park to about 2,043 acres (827 ha). In February 2007, the DFWP purchased a $334,000 permanent conservation easement on 418 acres (169 ha) of the DRNC-owned land. DFWP would pay a lease fee for five years on the land, during which time it would seek funding to pay the easement from the state legislature. The easement was purchased in March 2010.

Additional expansion was explored in 2009. In early 2009, the ANPA and Hamlett began seeking a way to have the DNRC transfer the lands they leased to the DFWP, and take it out of production as farmland. On March 30, the DFWP agreed to take over the leases for a year. The ANPA and Hamlett suggested that the additional lands be used to house a small group of buffalo, or to provide camp sites for visitors. Non had been taken as of April 2011.

== Access, services, and wildlife ==
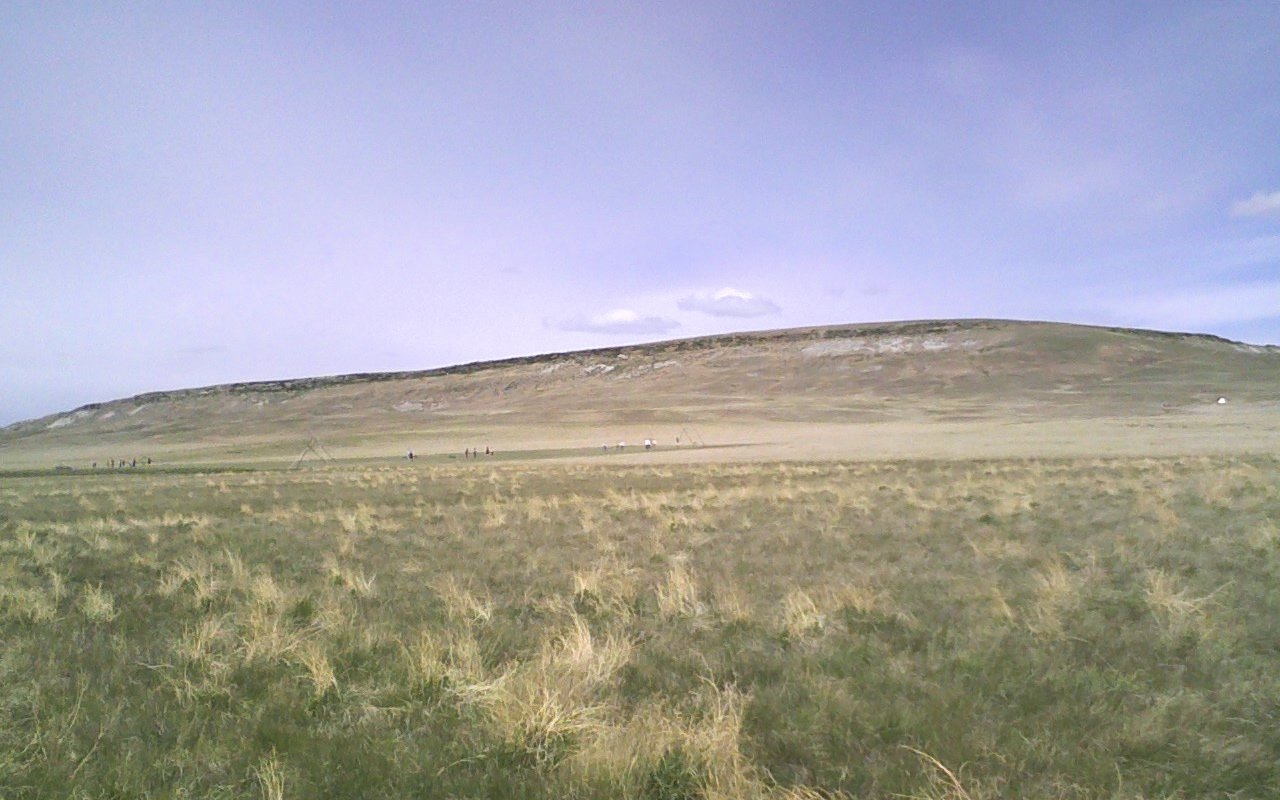
The buffalo jump

Entrance to the north end of the park is via Taft Hill Road (which approaches the base of the cliff), McIver Road from West Central in Great Falls; and to the east end via Ulm-Vaughn Road (which leads to the visitor center, the slope up the hill, and the summit of the cliffs). A 2-mile-long (3.2 km) trail leads from the visitor center to the cliff summit and back again, and includes signage about the buffalo jump along the way as well as a tipi ring (a ring of stones which indicate that a tipi was once held in place there). There are drinking water facilities, garbage cans, and public restrooms throughout the park.

First Peoples Buffalo Jump is managed by Region Four of the Montana state park system and, as of 2005, the park was operated by a full-time park manager, one full-time and two seasonal park rangers, and a part-time maintenance worker. The 1,481-acre (599 ha) park is open year-round. The park is reached by road by traveling 10 miles (16 km) south of Great Falls on Interstate 15, taking the Ulm exit, and then traveling 3.5 miles (5.6 km) on Ulm-Vaughn Road. Alternately, from Great Falls, it can be accessed via West Central Avenue, connecting to McIver Road. After 8.5 miles (13.7 km) at the T, turn left onto Ulm Vaughn Rd and, after a half mile, at the first turn in the road, the north entrance appears. Alternatively, continuing on Ulm Vaughn Road to the road leads to the top of the jump and the sign for the Visitor Center. During the summer (May–October) the park is open daily 8 a.m. to 6 p.m.; in the winter it is open from 10 a.m. to 4 p.m. Montana residents do not need to pay a fee to access the park, but non-residents must pay a $5.00 fee for automobiles or a $3.00 fee for accessing the park via foot or bicycle.

The visitor center consists of a main hall describing Native American buffalo culture and how buffalo hunts were organized, a room displaying archeological finds from the site, a gift shop, and restrooms. A picnic area is adjacent to the visitor center. The fields nearby are also available for use by the public. Visitors can see a stuffed bison bull, cow, and calf; a life-size tipi made of buffalo hides; and a 160-foot (49 m) mural depicting the surrounding landscape. The importance of bison in modern culture is also emphasized, and visitors can view a buffalo nickel coin and a football helmet adorned with the image of a bison. The visitor center exhibits were updated in 2006 to improve even further their historical accuracy. In 2009, eight new murals were unveiled, which updated and provided more information about Montana's Native American tribes.

Many artifacts such as arrowheads, pieces of pottery, bone knives, and bone scrapers can be found exposed or only slightly buried at First Peoples Buffalo Jump State Park. It is illegal to disturb these items, dig them up, or remove them from the park. Park rangers should be alerted to the location of these items when they are discovered.

=== Plants and animals ===
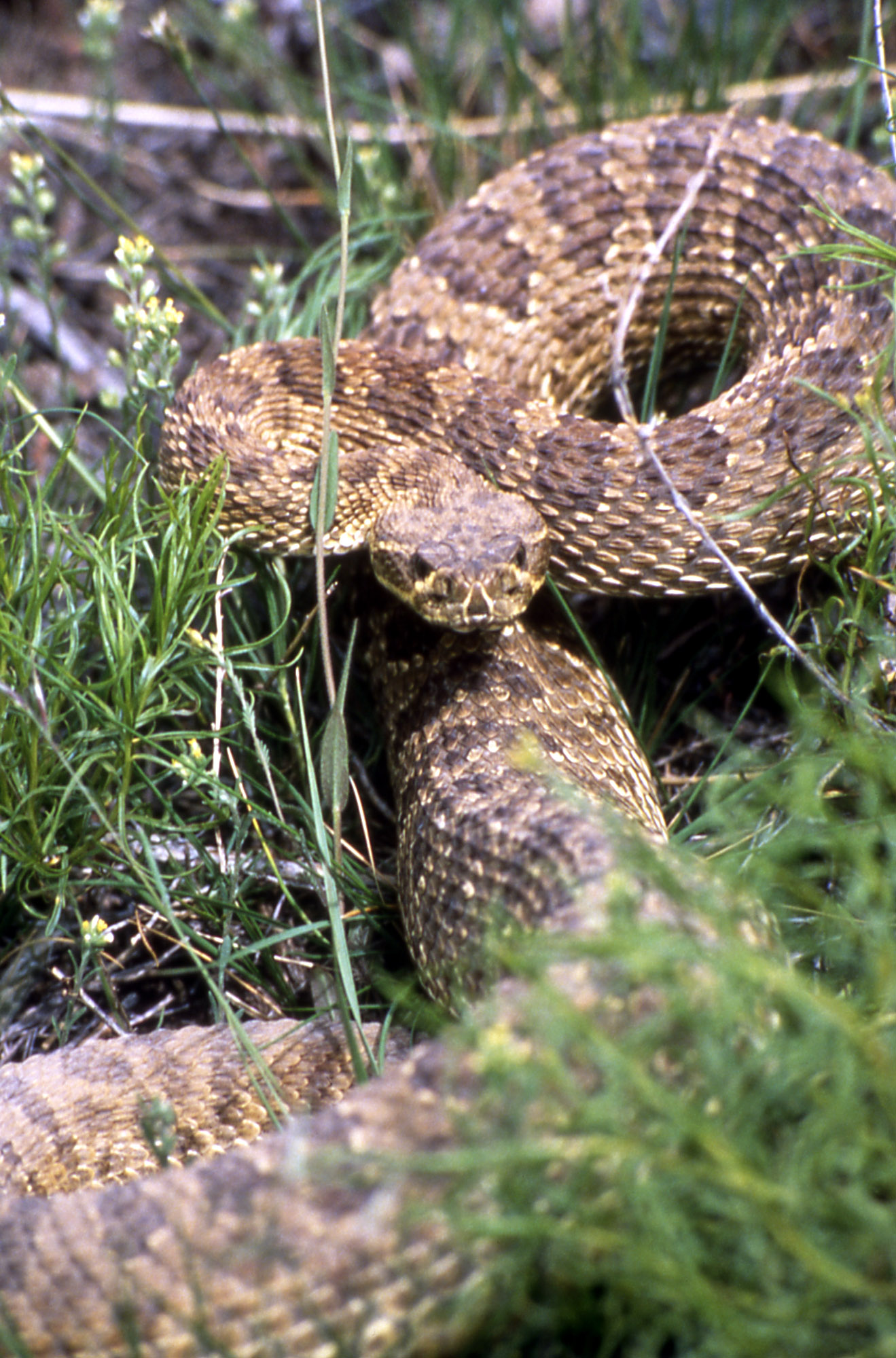
The prairie rattlesnake can be found at First Peoples Buffalo Jump State Park. Visitors are advised to wear heavy hiking boots when visiting the park.

A wide variety of plants and animals can be found at the pishkun. Among the plant species which grow there are blue grama, bluebunch wheatgrass, needle-and-thread grass, and prickly pear cactus. Wildlife which can be seen there include American badgers, black-tailed prairie dogs, burrowing owls, coyotes, curlews, ferruginous hawks, golden eagles, gopher snakes, gray partridges, great horned owls, larks, mice, mountain cottontails, mule deer, pheasants, porcupines, pronghorns, raccoons, racer snakes, red-tailed hawks, Richardson's ground squirrels, sharp-tailed grouse, striped skunks, Swainson's hawks, western rattlesnakes, and yellow-bellied marmots.

Hunting with bow and arrow is allowed on a lsmi within the park (although, hunting with firearms is not). Bow huting is limited to those areas furthest away from the trails and other visitor areas. Hunters primarily stalk antelope and mule deer within the park. Hunting in the park boundaries is not common; only 25 hunting permits were issued by the park in 2008.

Visitors are cautioned to be on the lookout for prairie rattlesnakes, which frequent the site. Visitors are asked to wear heavy hiking boots, watch small children closely, and keep pets on a leash.

=== Events ===
The Native American Cultural Fair is held in the park in late September of each year. The event features an art show (which often features hand-made Native American decorative art and fancy dress), traditional Native American games, songs, demonstrations of buffalo hide tanning, and lectures and demonstrations of traditional Native American culture, stories, and culture.

Since 2000, the park has also held an atlatl contest each September. The event, which draws participants from throughout the American West, features both accuracy and distance contests as well as atlatl-making courses.

In 2008, the University of Great Falls began hosting an annual Buffalo Jump Fun Run each Memorial Day weekend. The event includes a 3-mile (4.8 km) walk, a 6.25-mile (10.06 km) run, and a half-marathon.

== In popular culture ==
In 2000, University of Idaho music professor Dan Bukvich composed "Buffalo Jump Ritual," a symphonic piece inspired by a 1998 visit Bukvich made to the park. Commissioned by the Montana Bandmasters Association for the 2000 all-state high school band competition, "Buffalo Jump Ritual" utilizes Native American instruments and melodies, as well as rocks crashing against one another as percussion. In 2009, the nearby town of Ulm named its annual founding day anniversary event "Ulm Buffalo Days" in honor of the nearby pishkun. The Jumping Buffalo Cafe in Ulm is also named for the site.

== See also ==
- List of National Historic Landmarks in Montana
- National Register of Historic Places listings in Cascade County, Montana

== Bibliography ==
- Aarstad, Rich; Arguimbau, Ellen; Baumler, Ellen; Prosild, Charlene L.; and Shovers, Brian. Montana Place Names From Alzada to Zortman. Helena, Mont.: Montana Historical Society Press, 2009.
- Alberta-Montana Heritage Partnership. Alberta-Montana Discovery Guide: Museums, Parks & Historic Sites. Edmonton, Alb.: The Partnership, 1997.
- Baumler, Ellen. Montana Moments: History on the Go. Helena, Mont.: Montana Historical Society Press, 2010.
- Cheney, Roberta Carkeek. Names on the Face of Montana: The Story of Montana's Place Names. Missoula, Mont.: University of Montana, 1971.
- Conklin, David G. Montana History Weekends: Fifty-Two Adventures in History. Guilford, Conn. : Globe Pequot Press, 2002.
- Davis, Leslie B. "The 20th-Century Commercial Mining of Northern Plains Bison Kills." In Bison Procurement and Utilization: A Symposium. Leslie B. Davis and Michael Wilson, eds. Lincoln, Neb.: Plains Anthropologist, 1978.
- Dunn, Jerry Camarillo and Kennedy, Roger G. The Rocky Mountain States. New York: Stewart, Tabori & Chang, 1989.
- Engel, Jeff; Engel, Sherol; and Swan, James A. Chasing the Hunter's Dream: 1001 of the World's Best Duck Marshes, Deer Runs, Elk Meadows, Pheasant Fields, Bear Woods, Safaris, and Extraordinary Hunts. New York: HarperCollins Publishers, 2007.
- Fifer, Barbara. Along the Trail With Lewis and Clark. Helena, Mont.: Montana Magazine, 2001.
- Flannery, Timothy. The Eternal Frontier: An Ecological History of North America and Its Peoples. London: Heinemann, 2001.
- Gale, Kira. Lewis and Clark Road Trips: Exploring the Trail Across America. Omaha, Neb.: River Junction Press, 2006.
- Gilles, T.J. "History, Horizons, and Hi-Line." In Montana Weekender Road Trips. Helena, Mont.: Montana Magazine, 1999.
- Gottberg, John; Harris, Richard; and Haselsteiner, Fran. Hidden Rockies: The Adventurer's Guide. Berkeley, Calif.: Ulysses Press, 1995.
- Graf, Mike. Montana. Mankato, Minn.: Capstone Press, 2004.
- Halliday, Jan and Chehak, Gail. Native Peoples of the Northwest: A Traveler's Guide to Land, Art, and Culture. Seattle: Sasquatch Books, 2000.
- Hidy, Ralph W.; Hidy, Muriel E.; and Scott, Roy V. The Great Northern Railway: A History. Minneapolis: University of Minnesota Press, 2004.
- Patent, Dorothy Hinshaw and Muñoz, William. The Buffalo and the Indians: A Shared Destiny. New York: Clarion Books, 2006.
- Punke, Michael. Last Stand: George Bird Grinnell, the Battle to Save the Buffalo, and the Birth of the New West. New York: Smithsonian Books, 2007.
- Rinella, Steven. American Buffalo: In Search of a Lost Icon. New York: Spiegel & Grau, 2008.
- Robison, Ken. Cascade County and Great Falls. Charleston, S.C.: Arcadia Publishing, 2011.
- Schalla, Robert A. and Johnson, Eric H. Montana/Alberta Thrust Belt and Adjacent Foreland. Billings, Mont.: Montana Geological Society, 2000.
- Wilson, Garrett. Frontier Farewell: The 1870s and the End of the Old West. Regina, Sask.: University of Regina, Canadian Plains Research Center, 2007.
- Wright, John B. Montana Places: Exploring Big Sky Country. Mesilla, N.M.: New Mexico Geographical Society, 2000.
