= Big Goose Creek Buffalo Jump =

- U.S. National Register of Historic Places
- Location: Address restricted
- NRHP reference No.: 74002031
- Added to NRHP: February 12, 1974

The Big Goose Creek Buffalo Jump is a buffalo jump located in rural Sheridan County, Wyoming, United States. The site consists of the path which buffalo were driven along, the jump site, and the kill site below the cliff. It was added to the National Register of Historic Places in 1974.
