= Two Medicine Fight Site =

- U.S. National Register of Historic Places
- National Park Service photo of the site

- Location within Montana Location within the United States
- Location: about 25 miles southeast of Browning, Montana
- Coordinates: 48°28′0″N 112°28′0″W
- NRHP reference No.: 70000361
- Added to NRHP: October 6, 1970

Two Medicine Fight Site is a site on the National Register of Historic Places located roughly 25 miles southeast of Browning, Montana, within the eastern boundary of the Blackfeet Nation. The location was the site of the only violent encounter of the Lewis and Clark Expedition, on July 27, 1806.

It was added to the National Register on October 6, 1970.

== See also ==
- Camp Disappointment
