= Wold Bison Jump =

Archeological site in Wyoming, USA

- McKean Archeological Site (48CK7)
- U.S. National Register of Historic Places
- Location: Barnum, Wyoming vicinity
- NRHP reference No.: 15000928
- Added to NRHP: December 22, 2015

The Wold Bison Jump is an archeological site in Johnson County, Wyoming, United States. An area at the site was listed on the National Register of Historic Places in 2015.

The site was used as a bison jump during the 1300s to 1600s by Native Americans to kill bison by stampeding them over a cliff. The site is relatively attractive for that purpose because the cliff is not visible to the bison from afar, and the routes by which the bison must be channeled are relatively efficiently managed.
