= Buffalo jump =

Method used to kill bison en masse

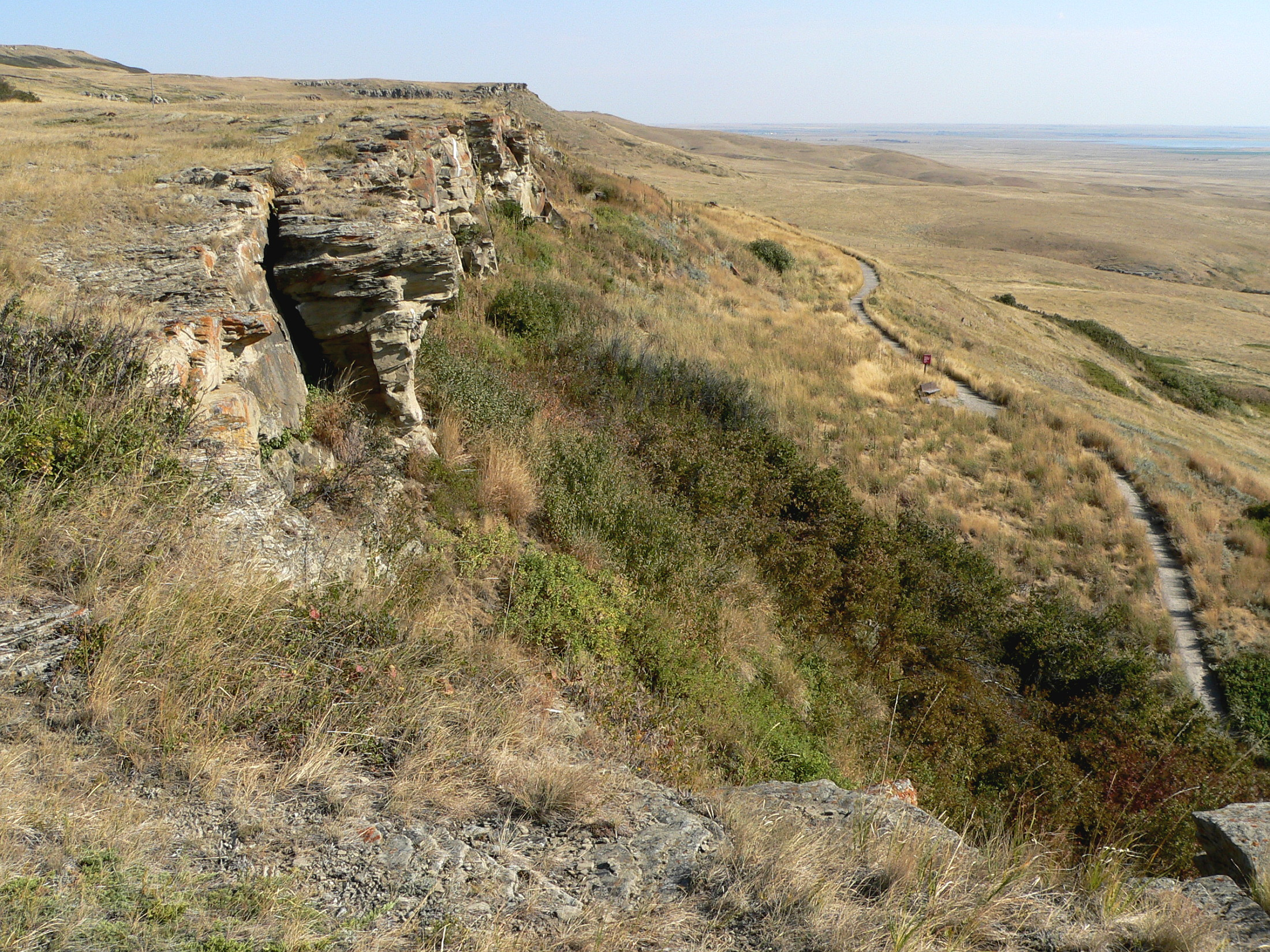
Head-Smashed-In Buffalo Jump, in southern Alberta

A buffalo jump, or sometimes bison jump, is a cliff formation that Indigenous peoples of North America, beginning with the Clovis culture (c. 11,100–10,800 BCE), historically used to hunt and kill plains bison in mass quantities. The broader term game jump refers to a man-made jump or cliff used for hunting other game, such as reindeer.

== Method of the hunt ==
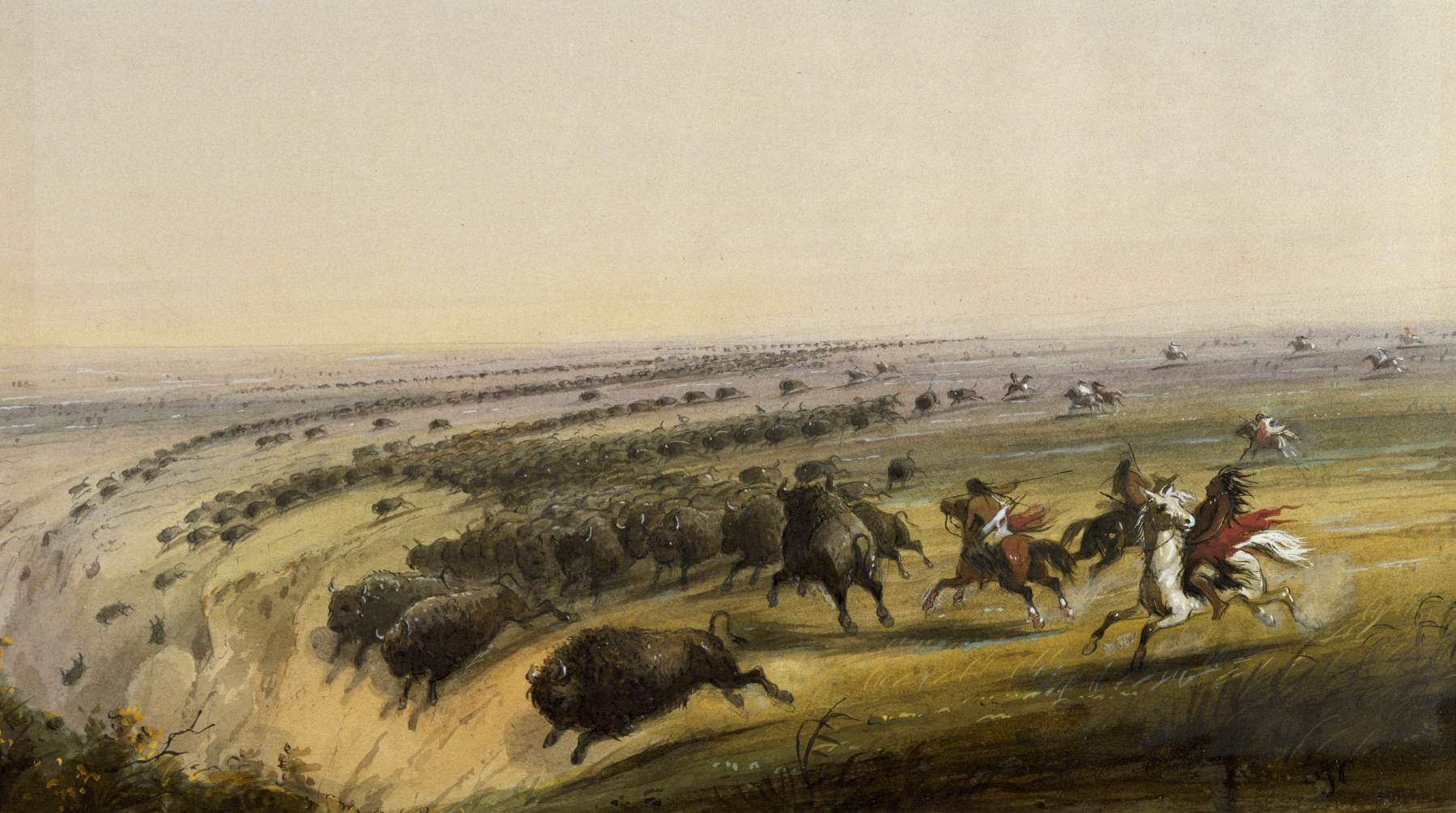
Buffalo being chased off a cliff, painted by Alfred Jacob Miller in the late 19th century.

Hunters herded the bison and drove them over the cliff; this process would serve to break the buffalo's legs and render them immobile, though often still alive and in great pain. Tribe members would wait below the jump and then close in with spears and bows to finish the kill. The Blackfoot people called the buffalo jumps "pishkun", which loosely translates as "deep blood kettle". They believed that if any buffalo escaped these killings then the rest of the buffalo would learn to avoid humans, which would make future hunts more difficult.

Due to the large number of buffalo that would be driven over the cliff, the practice has been criticized as having been highly wasteful. Many of the animals driven over the cliffs did not end up getting harvested. This was due primarily to the primitive tools and harvesting techniques available to indigenous peoples at the time.

Buffalo jump sites are often identified by rock cairns, which were markers designating "drive lanes", by which bison would be funneled over the cliff. These drive lanes would often stretch for several miles.

Buffalo jump sites yield significant archaeological evidence because processing sites and camps were always nearby. The sites yield information as to how the Native Americans used the bison for food, clothing, and shelter. Plains Indians, in particular, depended on the bison for their survival.

In one of his journals, Meriwether Lewis describes how a buffalo jump was practiced during the Lewis and Clark Expedition:

... one of the most active and fleet young men is selected and disguised in a robe of buffalo skin ... he places himself at a distance between a herd of buffalo and a precipice proper for the purpose; the other Indians now surround the herd on the back and flanks and at a signal agreed on all show themselves at the same time moving forward towards the buffalo; the disguised Indian or decoy has taken care to place himself sufficiently near the buffalo to be noticed by them when they take to flight and running before them they follow him in full speed to the precipice; the Indian (decoy) in the mean time has taken care to secure himself in some cranny in the cliff ... the part of the decoy I am informed is extremely dangerous.

== Historical sites ==
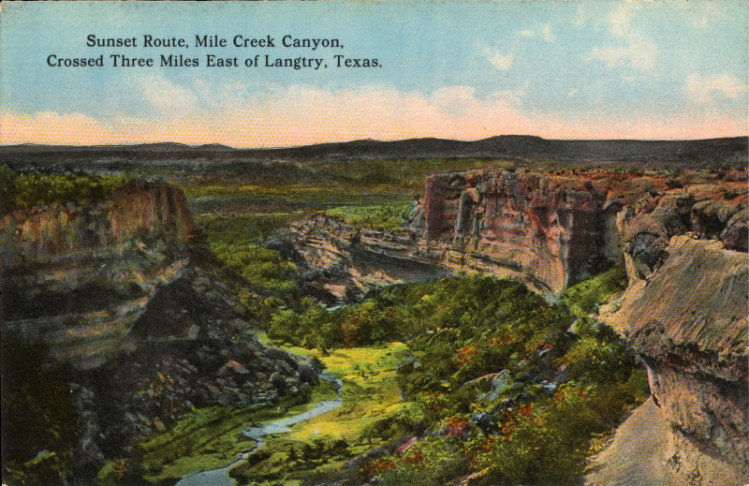
Mile Canyon bison jump site

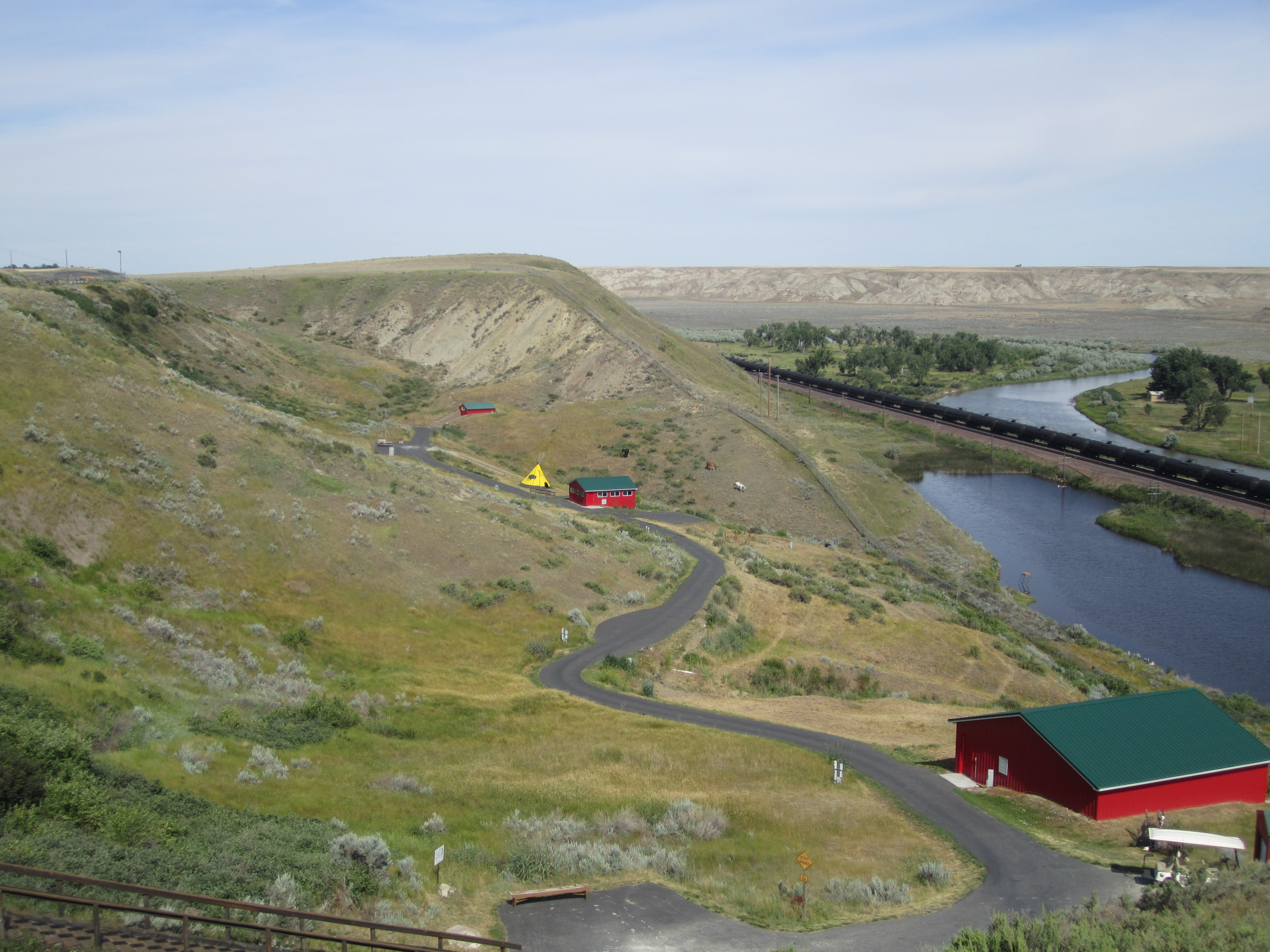
Wahkpa Chu'gn buffalo jump in Montana.

Sites of interest range from Alberta to Texas, including: Head-Smashed-In, Bonfire Shelter, Ulm Pishkun, Madison Buffalo Jump, Dry Island, Glenrock, Big Goose Creek, Cibolo Creek, Wold, Vore, Wahkpa Chu'gn (also includes Too Close for Comfort archaeological site), Olsen-Chubbuck Bison Kill Site, and Camp Disappointment of the Lewis and Clark Expedition.

Ulm Pishkun Buffalo Jump is likely the largest buffalo jump in the world. It was used by the Native Americans in the area between 900 and 1500 CE. The cliffs themselves stretch for more than a mile and the site below has compacted bison bones nearly 13 feet (4.0 m) deep, a testament to how many of the killed buffalo went unharvested by tribal peoples. Ulm Pishkun Buffalo Jump is located in First Peoples Buffalo Jump State Park in Cascade County, Montana, north-northwest of the community of Ulm.

Madison Buffalo Jump State Park is a Montana state park in Gallatin County, Montana in the United States. The park is 638 acres (258 ha) and sits at an elevation of 4,554 feet (1,388 m). The park is named for a canyon cliff used by Native Americans as a buffalo jump, where herds of bison were stampeded over the cliff as a means of mass slaughter. This limestone cliff was used for 2,000 years by Native Americans. Madison Buffalo Jump State Park is a day use-only park. It is open year-round for hiking, wildlife observation, and some picnicking.

Camp Disappointment, the northernmost point of the Lewis and Clark Expedition, is among the best-preserved buffalo jumps in Montana, due to its relatively inaccessible location. The creek at the bottom of the cliff periodically exposes bones of animals that were not harvested.

There is a 3-D reconstruction of Charles M. Russell's painting of a buffalo jump on display at the Helena State Capital Museum, Helena, Montana.

== See also ==
- Game drive system
- Petroform
- Desert kite
