= Camp Disappointment =

- U.S. National Register of Historic Places
- U.S. National Historic Landmark
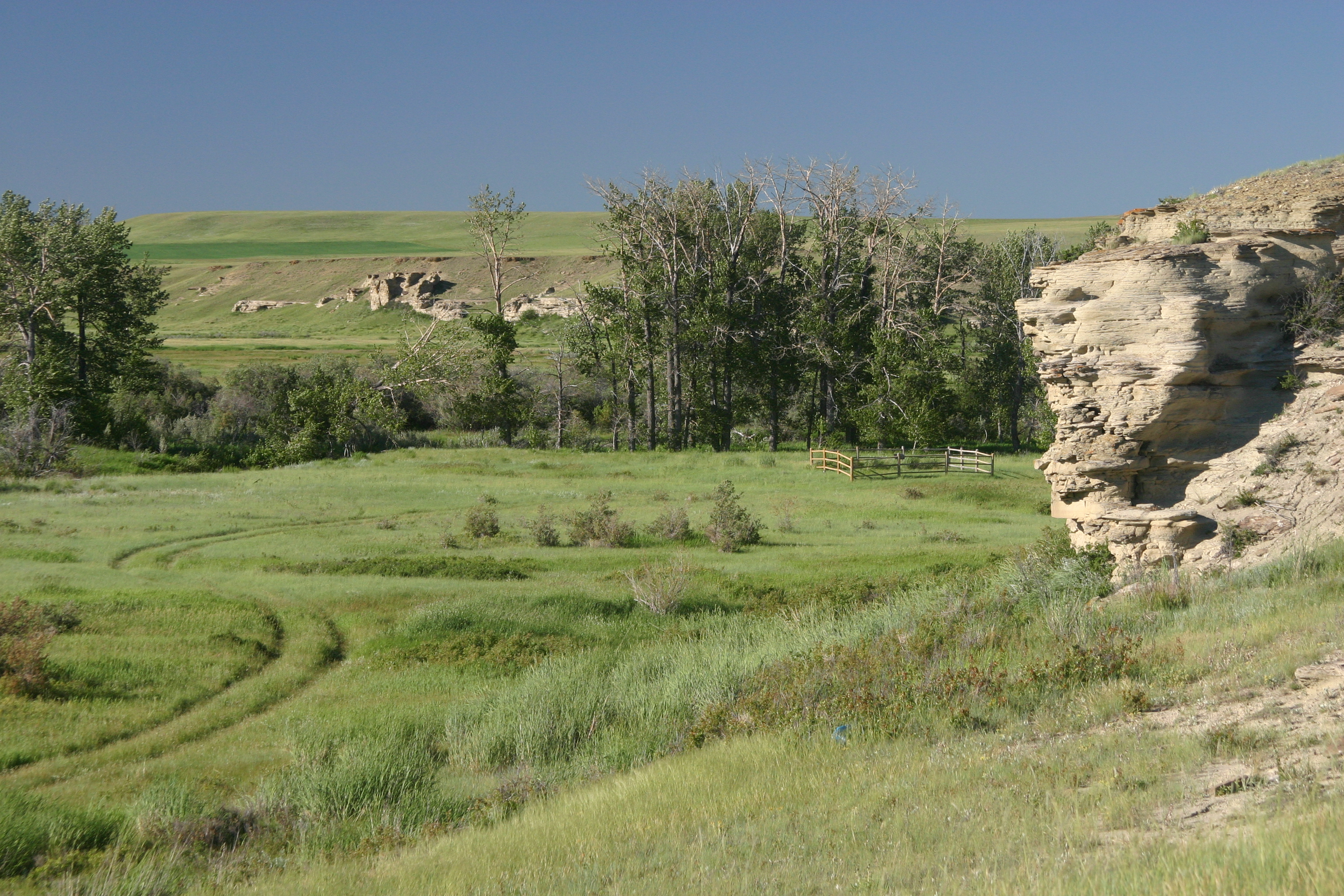
- Camp Disappointment, 2005, view northeast from south bluff. Camp site marked by fenced-in historical marker. Cottonwood trees in background line the banks of Cut Bank Creek. The ledge to the right was an Indian buffalo jump.

- Location within Montana Location within the United States
- Nearest city: Browning, Montana
- Coordinates: 48°39′52″N 112°48′26″W
- Built: 1806
- NRHP reference No.: 66000434

Significant dates
- Added to NRHP: October 15, 1966
- Designated NHL: May 23, 1966

Camp Disappointment is the northernmost campsite of the Lewis and Clark Expedition, on its return trip from the Pacific Northwest. The site is on private land within the Blackfeet Indian Reservation in Glacier County, Montana. It is located along the south bank of Cut Bank Creek and 12 miles (19 km) northeast of Browning, Montana. Glacier National Park can be seen in the distance.

The campsite was used by a detachment of the expedition from July 22–26, 1806. Captain Meriwether Lewis, George Drouillard, the two Fields brothers—Joseph and Reubin—, possibly five more men, along with six horses. The party was exploring the Marias River in an attempt to show that the Missouri River watershed extended to the 50th parallel north in order to claim more land for the United States under the Louisiana Purchase. However, they discovered that the watershed does not extend to the 50th parallel and consequently named their campsite Camp Disappointment. Lewis called the site which is shaded by cottonwood trees a "beautiful and extensive bottom". Since it was overcast and damp throughout their stay the expedition could not make any astronomical observations. This part of the expedition split off from William Clark's group at the Great Falls of the Missouri on July 16.

On the morning of July 26, 1806 they left the camp to head back and later that day met a party of eight Blackfeet Indians, the first members of that tribe that the expedition had encountered. The Blackfeet seemed friendly towards them, and the two parties agreed to set up and share a camp for the night. Over the course of the evening, the Blackfeet became aware that the expedition party had been trading with as well as brokering peace with any and all tribes that they'd encountered, including many of the Blackfeet's enemies and rivals. Among those goods traded were firearms, which especially aggravated the Blackfeet, as guns were then considered a relatively scarce and extremely valuable military commodity for the tribes of the area, and one which the Blackfeet had been trying to monopolize for themselves up until that point.

As a result, after both parties had apparently retired for the night, the Blackfeet men attempted to steal the expedition members' various guns while they slept. One of the party members awoke during the attempted burglary, thereby alerting the others, and the situation rapidly escalated into a violent conflict between the two groups. During the fight, two of the Blackfeet were shot and killed by two of the Lewis party members, in what the latter considered acts of deeply regrettable, yet necessary self-defense. Because the conflict occurred near the Two Medicine River, it subsequently became known as the Two Medicine Fight, and would be the only time throughout the entire Lewis and Clark Expedition that an encounter with Native Americans resulted in violence on either side.

In 1925 the Great Northern Railway erected a monument similar to the Washington Monument and a sign 4 miles (6.4 km) south of the campsite reached on July 23, 1806. This is near mile marker 233 and several hundred yards north of U.S. Route 2. Access to the campsite is only via a primitive road just west of this marker. It was declared both a National Historic Landmark and listed on the National Register of Historic Places in 1966.

The site is relatively unchanged since the expedition camped here. Though on private property, one can visit with an admission fee and a 4-wheel drive vehicle. The site includes an ancient Indian buffalo jump. From the National Register of Historic Places Nomination Form:

"At the campsite today wide lowland meadows are watered by the Cut Bank Creek and cottonwood trees line its banks. From the high wind-swept plains that rise above the site on the north and south you can trace the route of the creek into the foot of the mountains in the distance by the dark green foliage of the trees which mark its course.

"Immediately east of the meadow delineated as the probable campsite, and protecting the area from the strong winds, is a large stone cliff -- approximately 300 feet high and 600 feet wide -- of craggy grey stone. This very sheer precipice was an Indian buffalo jump, or pishkin, one of many in Montana, but one in particularly good condition, probably because of its isolated location. The creek which washes directly by the foot of the cliff has exposed many bones of the animals killed during the Indian-instigated buffalo stampedes over the cliff, which provided the people with large supplies of food and hides in the era before the Indians had horses for hunting."

== See also ==
- List of National Historic Landmarks in Montana
- National Register of Historic Places listings in Glacier County, Montana
