= Vore Buffalo Jump =

- U.S. National Register of Historic Places
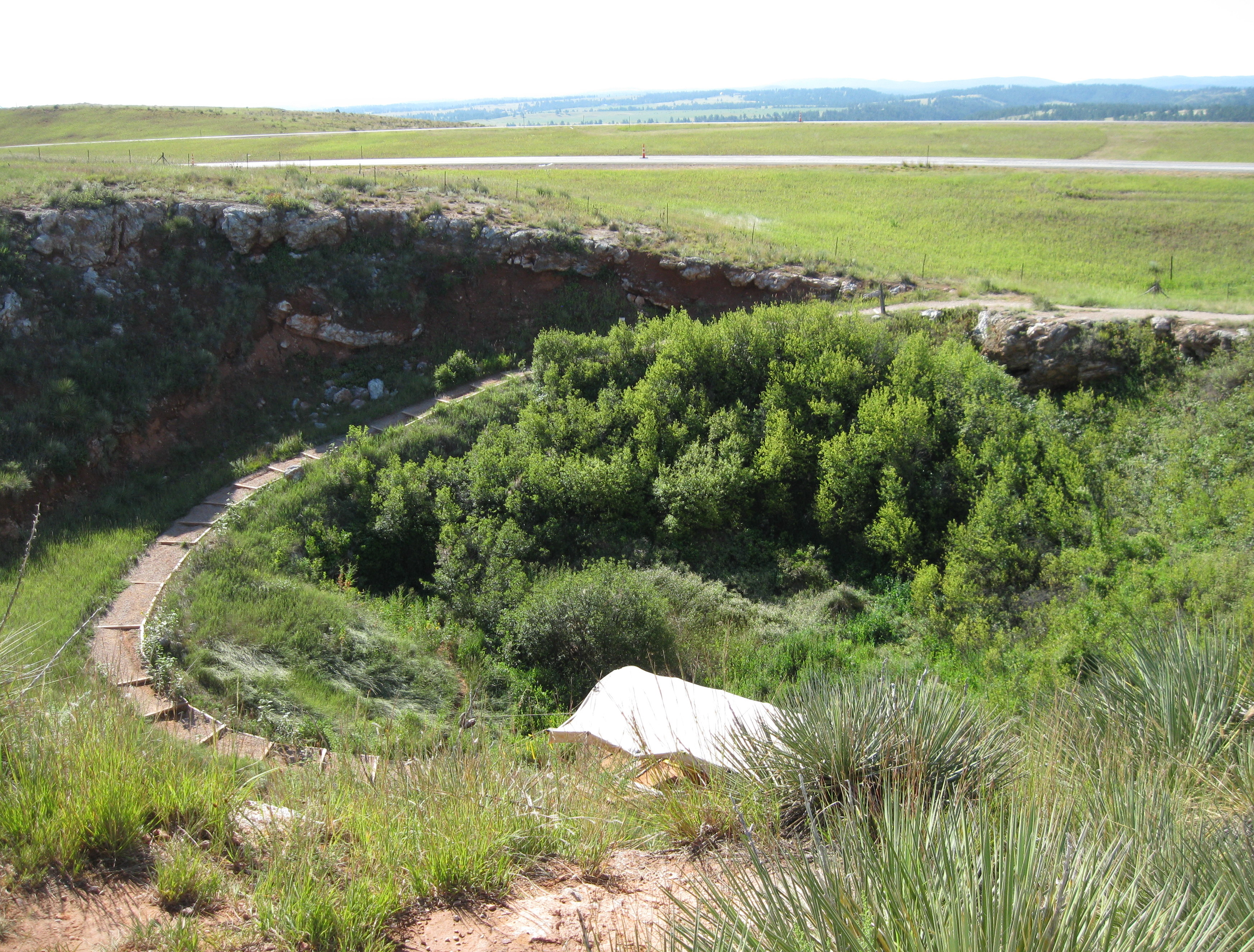

- Location within Wyoming Location within the United States
- Nearest city: Sundance, Wyoming
- Coordinates: 44°32′09″N 104°09′24″W
- NRHP reference No.: 73001930
- Added to NRHP: April 11, 1973

The Vore Buffalo Jump is an archeological site in Crook County, Wyoming. A sinkhole formed where gypsum soil was eroded, leaving a steep-sided pit about 40 feet (12 m) deep and 200 feet (61 m) in diameter. Native American hunters could stampede bison in the direction of the pit, which was deep enough to kill or disable the animals that were driven into it. The location is one of a number of buffalo jump sites in the north central United States and southern Canada. The Vore site was used as a kill site and butchering site from about 1500 AD to about 1800 AD. Archeological investigations in the 1970s uncovered bones and projectile points to a depth of 15 feet (4.6 m). About ten tons of bones were removed from the site. About five percent of the site has been excavated, and the pit is estimated to contain the remains of 20,000 buffalo.

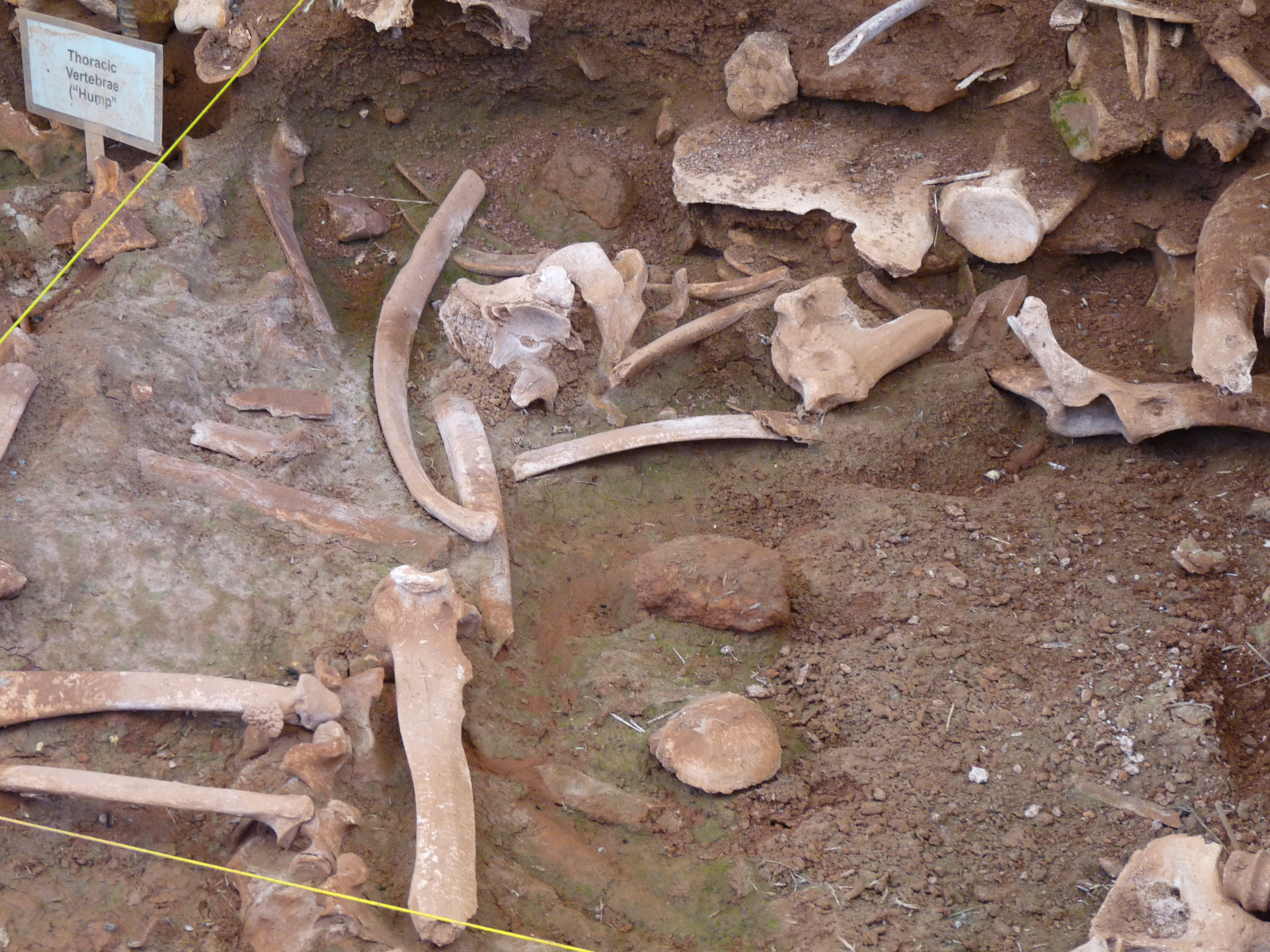
Bison bones in an excavation in the bottom of the buffalo jump.

Lithic evidence suggests that the Kiowa and Apache used the site as they migrated southwards to their modern home in the Texas-New Mexico region. Later peoples using the Vore site included the Shoshone, Hidatsa, Crow and Cheyenne.

The site was discovered during the construction of Interstate 90 in the early 1970s. Located on the Vore family ranch, the site was to be crossed by the Interstate. Exploratory drilling in the sinkhole yielded quantities of bison bones. The University of Wyoming was notified of the potential archeological site and the road was moved to the south. The site was investigated in 1971 and 1972 by Dr. George Frison of the University of Wyoming. In 1982 the site was transferred to the university by the Vore family with the stipulation that it be developed as a public education center within twelve years. Funding limitations prevented development, so the site was again transferred to the Vore Buffalo Jump Foundation, which has built a small interpretive center and provides interpretive services. The Vore site is located in a narrow strip of land between I-90 and old US 14. The site was placed on the National Register of Historic Places in 1973.
