= Glenrock Buffalo Jump =

- U.S. National Register of Historic Places
- Location within Wyoming Location within the United States
- Nearest city: Glenrock, Wyoming
- Coordinates: 42°50′38″N 105°56′00″W
- Area: less than one acre
- NRHP reference No.: 69000186
- Added to NRHP: April 16, 1969

The Glenrock Buffalo Jump is a 40-foot (12 m) high bluff in Converse County, Wyoming that was used by Native Americans as a buffalo jump. Bison were driven over the edge of the escarpment and were killed or injured by the fall, allowing the hunters to collect large quantities of meat at little hazard to themselves. Large amounts of buffalo bone and articles left by the hunters remain at the site, which was used from about 400 to 1750.

The Glenrock Buffalo Jump was placed on the National Register of Historic Places on April 16, 1969.
