= Madison Buffalo Jump State Park =

State park in Montana, USA

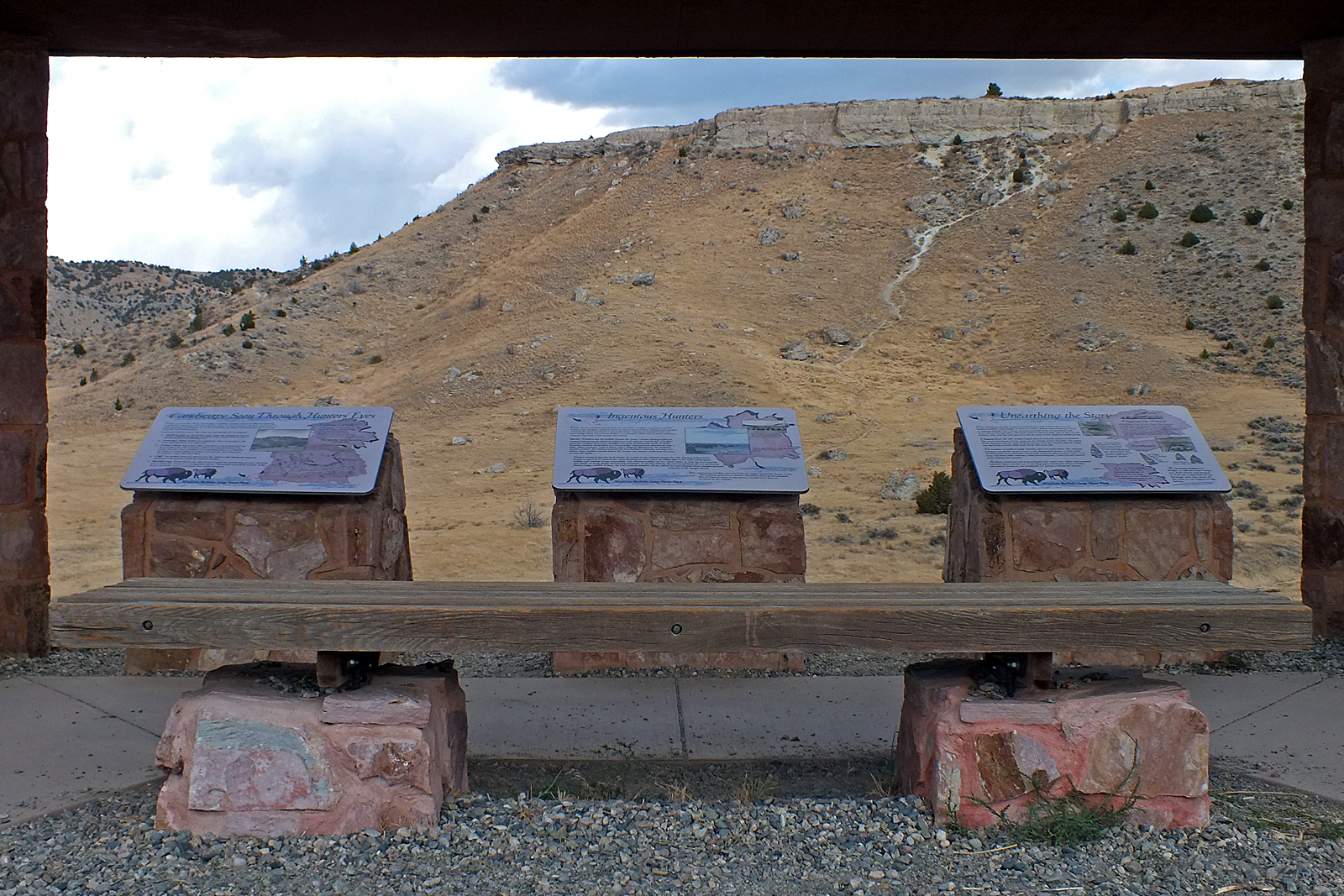
- Interpretive tablets facing the cliff

- Location within Montana
- Location: Gallatin County, Montana, United States
- Nearest town: Logan, Montana
- Coordinates: 45°47′40″N 111°27′45″W
- Area: 638 acres (258 ha)
- Elevation: 4,554 ft (1,388 m)
- Designation: Montana state park
- Established: 1966
- Named for: A buffalo jump in the Madison River valley
- Visitors: 35,466 (in 2023)
- Administrator: Montana Fish, Wildlife & Parks
- Website: Madison Buffalo Jump State Park

Madison Buffalo Jump State Park is a Montana state park located seven miles south of the Interstate 90 interchange at Logan in Gallatin County, Montana in the United States. The park preserves a canyon cliff used by Native Americans as a buffalo jump, where herds of bison were stampeded over the cliff as an efficient means of slaughter. The main geographic features of the jump site remain largely unchanged since the days of the jumps. Archaeologists have found tons of bison bones buried at the base of the cliffs. They have also uncovered the remains of tipi villages.

== History ==
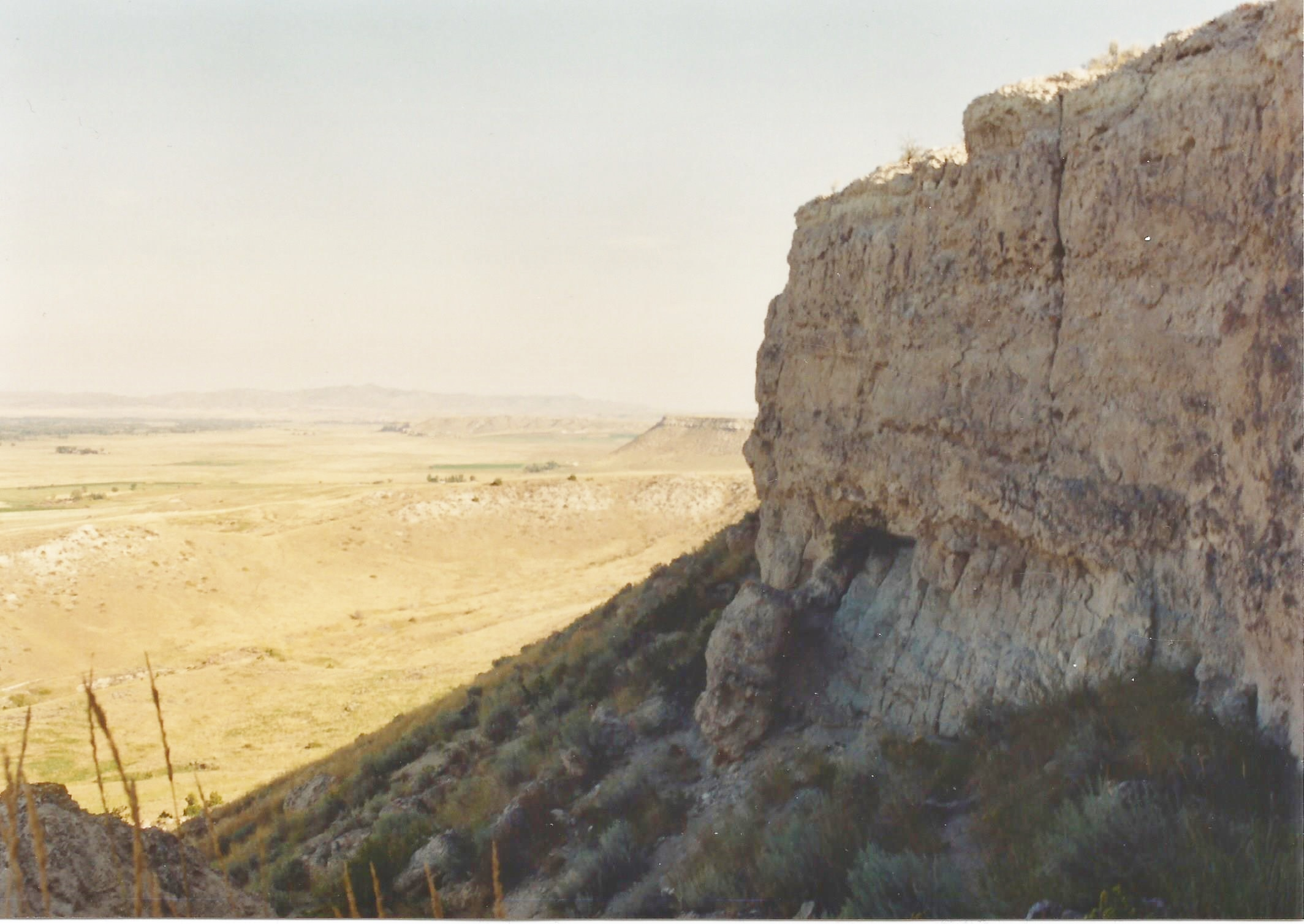
The Madison Buffalo Jump, Logan, Montana

The buffalo jump at Madison Buffalo Jump State Park was used by numerous Native American tribes for approximately 2000 years, dating as far back as 500 B.C. and ending around 1750 A.D. The indigenous peoples stampeded the herds of bison off the cliff without the aid of horses or guns. They used the bison for food, clothing, provisions and shelter. The bison were forced into a stampede by young men known as runners. The runners were trained for endurance and speed. The bison were also forced into groups by linear cairns and logs that were placed to funnel the bison into specific locations on areas in behind the cliff face. The introduction of the horse to North America by European explorers and settlers brought about the end of the buffalo jumps. The State park has not changed much over the years; bone shards are still scattered at the base of the cliff and tepee rings still gather around the top.

The buffalo jump along the Madison River was used by numerous tribes including the Hidatsa, Shoshone, Lakota, Dakota, Nez Perce, Bannock, Arapaho, Salish, Cheyenne, Blackfeet, Crow, Gros Ventres, Cree and Assiniboine. The families of the runners from the tribes would camp at the base of the cliffs. From there they were able to process the bison. The meat was used for food and the meat that was not eaten right away was dried. Skins were used for tipis and horns and bones were used for various types of tools.

== State park ==
The park is 638 acres (258 ha) of which the Montana Department of Natural Resources and Conservation owns 617 acres, with Montana Fish, Wildlife & Parks owning the remaining acreage. There is a small picnic area near the parking lot. An interpretive hiking trail leads visitors to the top of the cliff. Madison Buffalo Jump State Park is a day-use park, open year-round for hiking, wildlife observation, and limited picnicking.
